= Kayode =

- Gender: Male
- Language: Yoruba

Origin
- Origin: Nigeria
- Meaning: Brings lots of happiness with him/her
- Region of origin: South-west Nigeria

Kayode is both a surname and a masculine given name of Yoruba origin. The name means "Brings lots of happiness with him/her."

== Surname ==
- Adetokunbo Kayode (born 1960), Nigerian lawyer and politician
- Bunmi Kayode (born 1985), Nigerian footballer
- Femi Fani-Kayode (born 1960), Nigerian lawyer and politician, son of Remi
- Remi Fani-Kayode (1921–1995), Nigerian lawyer and politician, father of Rotimi and Femi
- Joshua Kayode (born 2000), Nigerian footballer
- Lateef Kayode (born 1983), Nigerian boxer
- Lola Fani-Kayode, Nigerian television producer
- Mariam Kayode (born 2007), Nigerian actress
- Michael Kayode (born 2004), Italian footballer
- Olarenwaju Kayode (born 1993), Nigerian footballer
- Oluwapelumi Arameedey Kayode, Nigerian actress
- Oluyemi Kayode (1968–1994), Nigerian sprinter
- Princess Olufemi-Kayode, Nigerian psychologist
- Rotimi Fani-Kayode (1955–1989), Nigerian photographer, son of Remi

== Given name ==
- Kayode Adams (?–1969), Nigerian student activist
- Kayode Adebowale (born 1962), Nigerian academic
- Kayode Ajulo (born 1974), Nigerian lawyer
- Kayode Akinsanya (born 1973), Nigerian badminton player
- Kayode Alabi (born 1963), Nigerian politician
- Kayode Are, Nigerian army colonel
- Kayode Awosika (born 1998), American football player
- Kayode Ayeni (born 1987), American basketball player
- Kayode Bankole (born 2002), Nigerian footballer
- Kayode Elegbede (born 1955), Nigerian track and field athlete
- Kayode Eso (1925–2012), Nigerian jurist
- Kayode Kasum, Nigerian film director
- Kayode McKinnon (born 1979), Guyanese footballer
- Kayode Odejayi (born 1982), Nigerian footballer
- Kayode Oduoye (born 1970), Nigerian lawyer and politician
- Kayode Oladele (born 1963), Nigerian lawyer and politician
- Kayode Olofin-Moyin, Nigerian politician and navy officer
- Kayode Otitoju (born 1955), Nigerian politician
- Kayode Sofola, Nigerian jurist
- Kayode Soremekun, Nigerian academic
- Kayode Williams, Nigerian activist
- Sikiru Kayode Adetona (born 1934), Yoruba monarch
- Azeez Kayode Fakeye (born 1965), Nigerian sculptor
- Lateef Kayode Jakande (1929–2021), Nigerian journalist and politician
- Samson Kayode Olaleye (Hoàng Vũ Samson) (born 1988), Nigerian-Vietnamese footballer
