= Mike O'Neill (costume designer) =

British costume designer

- Born: September 21, 1945; Manchester, England
- Died: April 10, 2018 (aged 72); Salisbury, Wiltshire, England
- Occupation: Costume designer
- Years active: 1987–2012
- Spouses: 3, including Samantha Horn
- Children: 3

Mike O'Neill (21 September 1945 – 10 April 2018) was a British-Irish award winning costume designer for film and television.

== Early life and career ==
O'Neill was born in Manchester, the oldest of seven children. His mother had been a Tiller Girl, and has been described as an early show business influence. As a teenager he worked behind the scenes in Manchester theatres.

O'Neill studied theatre design at Nottingham University, and after graduation in the late 1960s, joined the Royal Shakespeare Company. For twelve years, he assisted the Head of Design, focusing on costume design and production. They produced six shows a year in Stratford, and O'Neill contributed colourwork, sampling, cutting and refining costumes. He worked on productions including Peter Brook’s The Dream, Buzz Goodbody’s Hamlet and Trevor Nunn’s Revenger’s Tragedy.

== Film and television ==
O'Neill's first film work was for Roman Polanski's Macbeth in 1971.

To establish himself in costume for film and television, O'Neill did "all sort of things... some of which were hysterically bad," but soon broke through with G.B.H. (1991, written by Alan Bleasdale), a contemporary drama shot in O'Neill's hometown of Manchester. This was followed by the ITV drama Prime Suspect, starring Helen Mirren.

O'Neill assembled a "thoughtful and highly skilled team" – in the words of screenwriter Sandy Welch – who helped to bring detailed attention to small supporting parts as well as the main characters. This was most evident in Dickensian and social realist productions, for example Our Mutual Friend (1998), which won a Royal Television Award for Best Costume, and North and South (2004).

In the early 1990s, O'Neill met Samantha Horn, who became his costume design partner; the couple married in 1999. Together they were nominated for multiple BAFTA and Royal Television Society awards, and found success throughout the 2000s with lavishly costumed, high-end period dramas and literary adaptations, including Daniel Deronda (2002), starring Romola Garai as Gwendolen. Garai credited O'Neill with helping her find the character, and praised his "artistry, ambition, use of colour and attention to detail”.

In 2003, O'Neill and Horn won the BAFTA for Best Costume design for Charles: The Pride and the Passion, starring Rufus Sewell as King Charles II. Although he used lustrous fabrics and jewel-like colours, O'Neill's purpose was to create believable, realistic characters, and costumes were at the service of that aim.

In 2005, O'Neill reunited with Prime Suspect star Helen Mirren for the miniseries Elizabeth I. The production was filmed largely in Lithuania, where Horn and O'Neill worked with local teams of tailors and costumiers. Jeremy Irons was only available at minute for fittings, so three costumes had to be produced within twenty-four hours when he arrived the day before shooting. Horn and O'Neill won a Primetime Emmy and a Costume Designers Guild Award for their work on the series.

In 2007, O'Neill returned to his Shakespearean days with a stage production of Macbeth, starring Sir Patrick Stewart. This version of the play, directed by Rupert Goold, was set in a twentieth century military dictatorship. Guardian theatre critic Michael Billington praised the production's "magnificently realised... plausible world", singling out Lady Macbeth's "kitchen pinny" as a tangible detail of realism.

The Damned United (2009) brought O'Neill back to the twentieth century in the North of England, an adaptation of David Peace's novel about Brian Clough, the real-life manager of football team Leeds United. O'Neills' final credit was for four episodes of Season 2 of BBC drama Accused, a contemporary drama starring many notable actors from British film and television.

== Filmography ==
=== Film ===
Year	Title	Director	Notes
1995	I.D.	Phil Davis	
1996	Hard Men	J. K. Amalou	
2005	Heidi	Paul Marcus	
2009	The Damned United	Tom Hooper	

=== Television ===
Year	Title	Notes
1987	ChuckleVision	1 episode
1988	The Satellite Show	13 episodes
1989	Roland's Rat Race	7 episodes
1990	Children's Ward	8 episodes
1991	G.B.H.	7 episodes
1992	In Suspicious Circumstances	1 episode
1992-1995	Prime Suspect	6 episodes
1993	Maigret	6 episodes
1996	Hamish Macbeth	3 episodes
1998	Our Mutual Friend	4 episodes
1998	Undercover Heart	3 episodes
1999	Plastic Man	2 episodes
1999	The Waiting Time	Television film
1999	David Copperfield	2 episodes
2001	Love in a Cold Climate	2 episodes
2002	Night Flight	Television film
2002	Fields of Gold	2 episodes
2002	Daniel Deronda	4 episodes
2003	Charles II: The Power and the Passion	4 episodes
2004	North & South	4 episodes
2005	Elizabeth I	2 episodes
2006	See No Evil: The Moors Murders	1 episode
2007	Mansfield Park	Television film
2008	Fairy Tales	1 episode
2008	The Shooting of Thomas Hurndall	Television film
2009	Hunter	1 episode
2010	Great Performances	1 episode
2010	This September	2 episodes
2012	Accused	4 episodes

== Awards and nominations ==
Major associations

BAFTA Awards

Year	Category	Nominated work	Result	Ref.
British Academy Television Awards
1999	Best Costume Design	Our Mutual Friend	Nominated	
British Academy Television Craft Awards
2002	Best Costume Design	Love in a Cold Climate	Nominated	
2003	Best Costume Design	Daniel Deronda	Nominated	
2004	Best Costume Design	Charles II: The Power and the Passion	Won	
2006	Best Costume Design	Elizabeth I	Nominated	

Emmy Awards

Year	Category	Nominated work	Result	Ref.
Primetime Emmy Awards
2006	Outstanding Costumes for a Miniseries, Movie, or Special	Elizabeth I	Won	

Miscellaneous awards

List of Mike O'Neill other awards and nominations
Award	Year (Note: Indicates the year of ceremony. Each year is linked to the article about the awards held that year, wherever possible.)	Category	Nominated Work	Result	Ref.
Costume Designers Guild Awards	2003	Outstanding Made for Television Movie or Miniseries	Elizabeth I	Won	
