= Steve Gukas =

Nigerian filmmaker and director

- Born: Nigeria
- Occupations: Filmmaker, Film director
- Known for: 93 Days (2016) • A Place in the Stars (2014)

Steve Gukas is a Nollywood filmmaker, director and producer who believes that films should be used to address the ills of the society.

== Education ==
Gukas studied Television Production at NTA TV College in Jos, Theatre Arts at the University of Jos and Film production at the London Film School, United Kingdom.

== Career ==
He is a former managing director of a Nigerian radio station, WE FM.

In 2002, he directed the movie "Keeping Faith". In 2007, he produced the iconic movie, "Namibia: The Struggle for Liberation", featuring the American actor, Danny Glover; it was his first project.

In 2014, the film he directed and produced, "A Place in the Stars" was released. The film was produced in honour of Dora Akunyili, the late Director-General of the National Agency for Food and Drug Administration and Control (NAFDAC), who fought against the production, sales and usage of adulterated drugs in Nigeria. The movie starred Segun Arinze, Dejumo Lewis, Matilda Obaseki, Gideon Okeke, Yemi Blaq and Femi Branch. Later on, at the 2015 Africa Magic Viewers Choice Awards (AMVCA), the movie won the Best Movie (Drama) award.

In 2016, he directed the movie, "93 Days", a movie created in memory of Dr. Stella Ameyo Adadevoh, a late Nigerian physician who alongside other health workers in Lagos, helped stop the spread of the Ebola virus in Nigeria by sacrificing herself to the task in 2014. The movie featured Nollywood actors and Bimbo Akintola, Danny Glover, Seun Ajayi, Keppy Ekpeyong and Bimbo Manuel. The film streams on NETFLIX. The movie, alongside two others ("Isoken" and "The Bridge") were the first movies to be screened in the "Nollywood in Hollywood" initiative's first edition. The movie premiered in early September 2016 at the Toronto International Film Festival and at the Chicago International Film Festival.

He also produced, "Keeping The Faith" and "Mr. Johnson". He, as well desires to make a film on the Nigeria's Plateau State capital, Jos.

He was part of the discussants at the 2017 Rapid Lion South African International Film Festival in which participants discussed the present and future of the African Cinema.

He was a co-producer of a sequel to the movie which gave birth to Nigeria's Nollywood, titled "Living in Bondage", originally produced in 1992, who according to Ramsey Nouah, the film's director as well as an actor in reference to Gukas, had "a reputation of doing big projects". The film featured actors like Kenneth Okonkwo, Kanayo O. Kanayo and Bob-Manuel Udokwu, Enyinna Nwigwe and Kalu Ikeagwu.

In the AMVCA awards 2020, for the 2019 movie, "Living in Bondage", he won the "Best Movie West Africa" award, with a cash prize of N1,000,000, courtesy of Clorets, in support to the Nigerian Movie Industry.

== Quotes ==
‘I think Fela said it best during his time when he said that for an African musician, music shouldn’t be just about enjoyment. You should use it to speak about things that are important to your society. And I believe that it is a very strong statement. Because what that says is that when you have a voice, you have a platform, you have a responsibility,”

“Yes, entertainment is important but I think you can mix entertainment with a degree of commentary and tackling of issues that are relevant, especially in our clime where there is the need for that. In more advanced climes, they face fewer problems than we face and therefore can dedicate a lot of their talent to entertainment and creating likeness for the consumer of their products. But while we do have that need, issues like these should be addressed, it should be put in the front burner so that conversations can foster.”

== Filmography ==
Year	Title	Role	Notes
2025	Color Me True	executive producer	
2025	The Lost Days	executive producer	
2025	Katangari Goes to Town	executive producer	
2024	A Danfo Christmas	executive producer	
2024	At Ease	executive producer	
2024	A Father's Love	executive producer	
2024	Kill Boro	executive producer	
2023	Love and Life	producer	
2022	It Blooms in June	executive producer, producer	
2022	Cake	executive producer, producer	
2019	Living in Bondage: Breaking Free	co-producer	
2016	93 Days	director	
2014	A Place in the Stars	director • co-producer	
2007	Namibia: The Struggle for Liberation	producer	
2002	Keeping Faith	director	

== See also ==
- List of Nigerian film directors
- List of Nigerian film producers
