= List of people from Lagos =

This is a list of notable people from Lagos, the most populous city in Nigeria.

== Business ==
- Toyin Saraki, global health advocate and healthcare philanthropist

== Politicians and rulers ==
- Rilwan Akiolu, Oba (traditional ruler) of Lagos
- Brigadier Mobolaji Johnson, Pioneer and first Governor of Lagos State
- F.C.O Coker, First Nigerian Municipal Treasurer, First Secretary to the Lagos state Government
- Dr. Lanre Towry-Coker, Nigerian architect, politician and socialite. First Commissioner for Works and Housing of Lagos State.
- Akinwunmi Ambode, former Governor of Lagos state
- Babatunde Fashola, former Governor of Lagos and former Minister of Power, Works and Housing
- Lekan Fatodu, politician and journalist
- Bode George, politician
- Alhaji Lateef Jakande, former governor of Lagos State
- Yemi Osinbajo, politician, lawyer, and former vice-president of Nigeria.
- Babajide Sanwo-Olu, governor of Lagos State
- Bola Tinubu, President of Nigeria and former Governor of Lagos State
- Funsho Williams, politician and one-time aspirant to the office of Lagos state governor

== Sports ==
- Kenny Adeleke (born 1983), Nigerian-American basketball player
- Israel Adesanya (born 1989), Nigerian-New Zealand former UFC middleweight champion
- Nelson Agholor (born 1993), professional American football player, Super Bowl LII Champion with the Philadelphia Eagles in 2018
- Tunji Awojobi (born 1973), professional basketball player
- Udoka Azubuike (born 1999), Nigerian-American basketball player in the Israeli Basketball Premier League
- Ade Coker (born 1954), football player who represented the United States national team
- Arnaut Danjuma, football player
- Oba Femi, professional wrestler
- Dimaku Fidelis (born 1989), footballer
- Israel Idonije, Nigerian-Canadian professional NFL American football player, Chicago Bears 2003–2013, Detroit Lions 2013
- Anthony Nwakaeme, football player
- Anoure Obiora, football player
- Derek Ogbeide (born 1997), Nigerian-Canadian basketball player for Hapoel Jerusalem in the Israeli Basketball Premier League
- Chiedozie Ogbene, Irish football player
- Uche Okechukwu, football player
- Hakeem Olajuwon (born 1963), Nigerian-American professional NBA basketball player
- Omos, professional wrestler
- Tijani Luqman Opeyemi, professional soccer player
- Victor Osimhen, football player
- Qudus Wahab (born 2000), basketball player for Maccabi Ashdod of the Israeli Basketball Premier League

== Other ==
- Sejiro Avoseh, artist
- Akintoye, rapper and TikTok personality
- Omogie Ojei, (femi.the.god) visual artist and poet.
- Oyinkan Braithwaite, novelist and writer ( My Sister, the Serial Killer)
- Oluwashina Okeleji, sports journalist
- Babs Olusanmokun, actor and Brazilian jiu-jitsu champion.
- Ronke Giwa-Onafuwa, radio presenter and broadcaster
- Ayibatonye Owei, former Commissioner of Health
- Mona Khalil, conservationist and environmentalist
