= Oluwa =

Yoruba name prefix

The Oluwa name prefix is of Yoruba origin. "Oluwa" is the Yoruba word for Lord, though in this context, it is used to refer to God. It is a prefix and used with other relevant words/name. It is mostly used in some Yoruba first names and in fewer Yoruba last names (surnames).

== Examples of names including "Oluwa" ==
Examples include:

- Oluwadamilola – A unisex name that means "The Lord (God) has decorated me with wealth".
- Oluwaseun – This name means "The Lord (God) has done great".
- Oluwadarasimi – A unisex name that means "God has been good to me".
- Oluwademilade – A unisex name that means "God has crowned me".
- Oluwapelumi – This name is unisex, and it means "God is with me".
- Oluwashindara – This name means "God still does wonders".
- Oluwaferanmi – A unisex name that means "God loves me".
- Oluwafunmilayo – A unisex name that means "God gave me joy".
- Oluwafunso – A unisex name that means "God has given you to look after".
- Oluwagbenga – This name is given to male babies meaning "God has lifted me up".
- Oluwakanyinsola – This is a name for girls, and it means "God has added sweetness to my wealth".
- Oluwatoyin – This is a unisex name (although it is more common for girls than boys) and it means "God is worthy to be praised".
- Oluwatunmise – A unisex name that means "God has regenerated me".
- Oluwabukola – A unisex name that means "God has added to wealth" or "Good has increased wealth".
- Oluwabusayo – A unisex name meaning "God adds to the joy".
- Oluwabusola – This is a girl's name, and it means "God adds to wealth".
- Oluwadamilare – A name given to male babies meaning "God exonerates/acquits me".
- Oluwafemi – This name is for boys, and it means "God loves me".
- Oluwafeyifunmi – This name is for girls, and it means "God has given this one to me".
- Oluwafeyikemi – This is a name for girls, and it means "God uses this (one) to care for me".
- Oluwafeyisayo – This is a name for girls, and it means "God uses this (one) to add to (my) joy" or "God has turned this gift into joy".
- Oluwatobi – A unisex name meaning "God is big", or "God is mighty".
- Oluwatofunmi – A Yoruba name for girls meaning "God is enough for me", or "God is sufficient for me".
- Oluwatomiwa – A unisex name that means "God has come for me".
- Oluwatosin – A unisex name that means "God is worthy of worship".
- Oluwadimimu – This name means "God is holding me".

== Notable people ==
- Oluwashina Okeleji
- Oluwatoyin Asojo
- Oluwaseun Oyegunle
- Oluwasegun Abiodun
- Oluwapelumi Arameedey Kayode
- Oluwakemi Adejoro Ojo
- Oluwafunmilayo Olajumoke Atilade
- Mojisola Oluwa
- Oluwademilade "Demi" Adejuyigbe

== Deities ==
- Orisa Oluwa, a deity in the Yoruba religion

== See also ==
- Olu, a diminutive of Oluwa as a given name
