= Ebola in Nigeria =

Ebola virus disease in Nigeria

Ebola virus disease in Nigeria
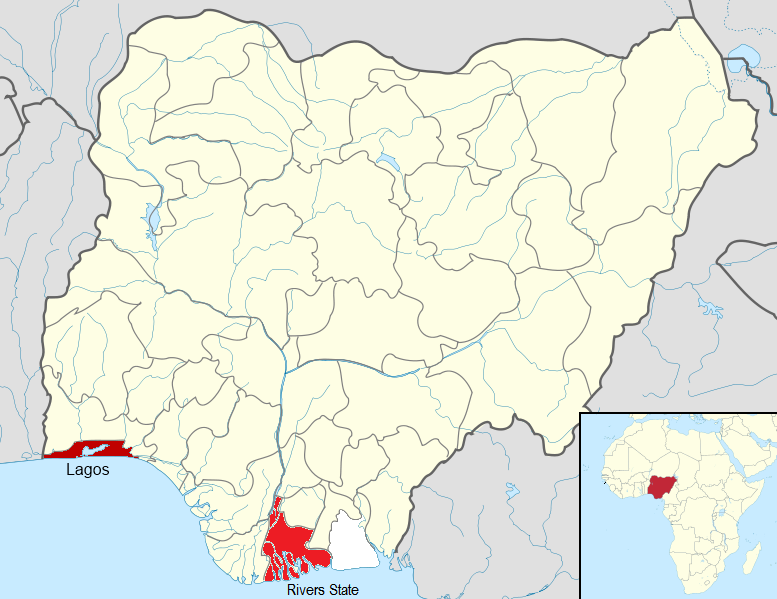
- Nigerian states with Ebola cases (Lagos and Rivers)
- Pathogen: Ebolavirus
- First outbreak: Patrick Sawyer
- Index case: 6 August 2014
- Confirmed cases: 20
- Deaths: 8

Cases of the Ebola virus disease in Nigeria were reported in 2014 as a small part of the epidemic of Ebola virus disease (commonly known as "Ebola") which originated in Guinea that represented the first outbreak of the disease in a West African country. Previous outbreaks had been confined to countries in Central Africa.

== Epidemiology ==
=== West African outbreak ===
On 25 March 2014, the World Health Organization (WHO) reported that Guinea's Ministry of Health had reported an outbreak of Ebola virus disease in four southeastern districts, with suspected cases in the neighbouring countries of Liberia and Sierra Leone being investigated. In Guinea, a total of 86 suspected cases, including 59 deaths had been reported as of 24 March. Outbreak control relies on a package of interventions including intensive supportive care of patients, infection prevention and control, disease surveillance and contact tracing, laboratory services, safe and dignified burials, vaccination if relevant, and social mobilization.

Also in 2026 a new case of Ebola has been Identified in FCT Abuja, Nigeria.

Researchers generally believe that a one-year-old boy, later identified as Emile Ouamouno, who died in December 2013 in the village of Meliandou, Guéckédou Prefecture, Guinea, was the index case of the Ebola virus disease epidemic. His mother, sister, and grandmother then became ill with similar symptoms and also died. People infected by those initial cases spread the disease to other villages.Although Ebola represents a major public health issue in sub-Saharan Africa, no cases had ever been reported in West Africa and the early cases were diagnosed as other diseases more common to the area. Thus, the disease had several months to spread before it was recognized as Ebola.

=== Index case ===
The index case in Nigeria was a Liberian-American, Patrick Sawyer, who flew from Liberia to Nigeria's most populous city of Lagos on 20 July 2014. Sawyer became violently ill upon arriving at the airport and died five days later. In response, the Nigerian government observed all of Sawyer's contacts for signs of infection and increased surveillance at all entry points to the country.

Sawyer was believed to have suspected he was infected with Ebola because he cared for his sister who died of the disease on July 8. He was hospitalised in Monrovia for fever and Ebola symptoms on July 17 before discharging himself (against professional medical advice) to fly to Lagos, where he lied to the staff of First Consultants Medical Centre that he had not had any exposure to anyone that had contracted Ebola.

=== Subsequent transmission ===
On 6 August 2014, the Nigerian health minister told reporters, "Yesterday the first known Nigerian to die of Ebola was recorded. This was one of the nurses that attended to the Liberian. The other five newly confirmed cases are being treated at an isolation ward." The nurse was Obi Justina Ejelonu.

The doctor who treated another infected person, Ameyo Adadevoh, subsequently also died of the virus.

Others that died included Mrs Ukoh (a Ward Maid at First Consultants Medical Center), Jato Asihu Abdulqudir (an acquaintance of Sawyer, who was on the plane with him and carried his bag when he was ill), a private hospital doctor in Port Harcourt who was treating Jato and an elderly patient at the hospital that treated the private hospital doctor for Ebola.

On 22 September 2014, the Nigeria health ministry announced, "As of today, there is no case of Ebola in Nigeria. All listed contacts who were under surveillance have been followed up for 21 days." According to the WHO, 20 cases and 8 deaths had been confirmed, including the imported case, who also died. Four of the dead were health care workers who had cared for Sawyer. In all, 529 contacts had been followed and of that date they had all completed a 21-day mandatory period of surveillance.

=== Outbreak successfully contained ===
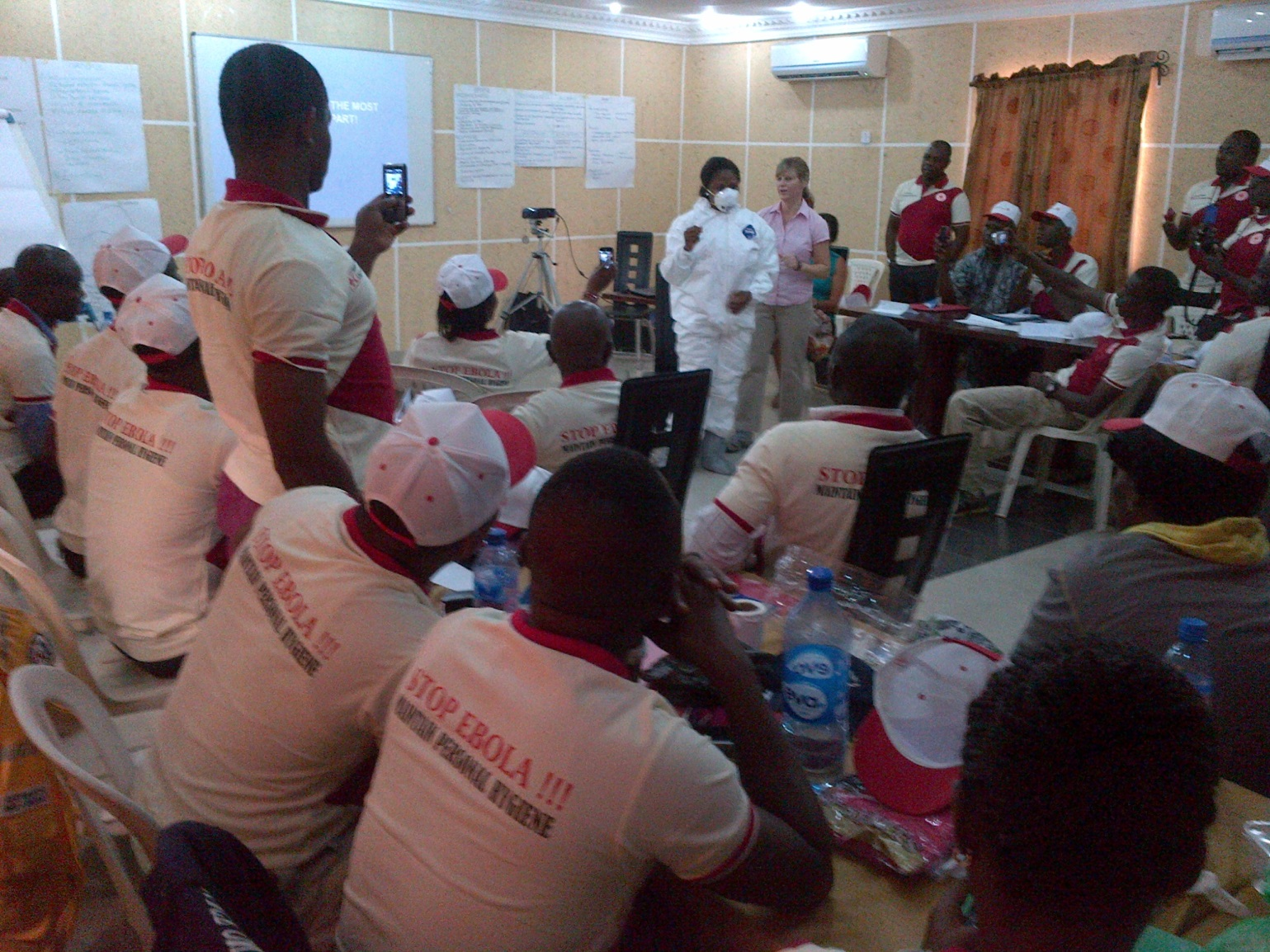
Nigerian health care workers at a training event, August 2014

On 9 October 2014, the European Centre for Disease Prevention and Control (ECDC) acknowledged Nigeria's positive role in controlling the effort to contain the Ebola outbreak. Nigeria's quick responses, including intense and rapid contact tracing, surveillance of potential contacts, and isolation of all contacts were of particular importance in controlling and limiting the outbreak, according to the ECDC. Complimenting Nigeria's successful efforts to control the outbreak, "the usually measured WHO declared the feat 'a piece of world-class epidemiological detective work'."

The WHO's representative in Nigeria officially declared Nigeria to be Ebola free on 20 October after no new active cases were reported in the follow-up contacts, stating it was a "spectacular success story".

=== Relief contributions to West Africa ===
On 14 August 2014 the Nigerian government said Aliko Dangote have donated $1 million to halt the spread of the Ebola virus outbreak. On 5 November 2014 volunteer medical workers arrived in Liberia and Sierra Leone from Nigeria. The first arrivals included 100 volunteers in Freetown, Sierra Leone and a further 76 in Liberia. Nigeria announced it would send 600 volunteers to help stem the spread of the disease.

== Background: Healthcare in Nigeria ==
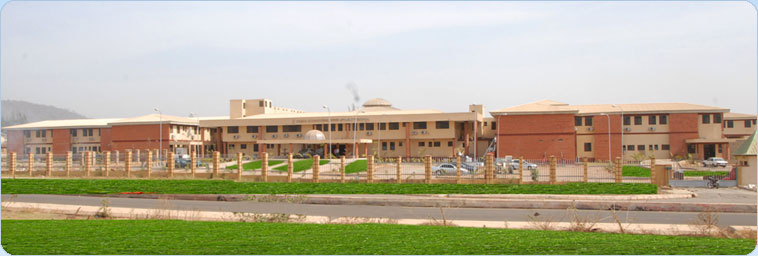
A hospital in Abuja, Nigeria's capital

Health care delivery in Nigeria is a concurrent responsibility of the three tiers of government in the country, and the private sector. Nigeria has been reorganizing its health system since the Bamako Initiative of 1987, which formally promoted community-based methods of increasing accessibility of drugs and health care services to the population, in part by implementing user fees. The new strategy dramatically increased accessibility through community-based healthcare reform, resulting in more efficient and equitable provision of services. A comprehensive approach strategy was extended to all areas of health care, with subsequent improvement in the health care indicators and improvement in health care efficiency and cost.

The Nigerian health care system is continuously faced with a shortage of doctors and nurses known as 'brain drain', because of emigration by skilled Nigerian doctors and nurses to North America and Europe. In 1995, it was estimated that 21,000 Nigerian doctors were practising in the United States alone, which was about the same as the number of doctors working in the Nigerian public service. Retaining these expensively trained professionals has been identified as one of the goals of the government.Despite this, in the 2014 Ebola outbreak, Nigeria was the first country to effectively contain and eliminate the Ebola threat that was ravaging three other countries in the West African region. The Nigerian unique method of contact tracing became an effective method later used by other countries, such as the United States, when Ebola threats were discovered.

== In popular culture ==
The 2016 Nigerian drama thriller film 93 Days tells the story of the treatment of Patrick Sawyer by Adadevoh and other medical staff, and the successful containment of the outbreak.

== See also ==
- Ebola virus epidemic in Sierra Leone
- Ebola virus epidemic in Guinea
- Ebola virus epidemic in Liberia
- Ebola virus disease in Mali
- 2014 Ebola Virus in West Africa timeline of reported cases and deaths
- Ebola virus epidemic in West Africa timeline
