= Imoh Umoren =

Nigerien filmmaker

- Born: 13 August 1982 (age 43); Nigeria
- Occupations: Director, producer, writer
- Years active: 2007–present

Imoh Umoren (born 13 August 1982), is a Nigerian filmmaker who primarily makes indie films. He is most notable as the director of the 2017 film Children of Mud. Umoren is considered the first filmmaker to make a silent black and white film in the Nollywood film industry.

== Personal life ==
He was born on 13 August 1982 in Nigeria. His father was a politician and mother was a college professor. Umoren credits his mother's influence for his career in filmmaking. Both of his parents died when he was a teenager, and he was raised by relatives until he struck out on his own at 16.

== Career ==
At the age of 9, Umoren started to write a comic series called The Wickeds with his closest friend Richie. He joined as a junior producer for 'Common Ground Production' and worked on an international series called The Station. Later, he involved with franchise TV productions such as Project Fame, MTV Advance Warning, Don’t Forget The Lyrics and Malta Guinness Street Dance.

At the age of 26, he made his first feature film Lemon Green. The film gained critical acclaim. Then in 2010, he directed the short film All Sorts Of Trouble. In 2013, his TV movie Have A Nice Day was nominated for Best Cinematography. In 2015 he directed the black and white silent movie Hard Times, which won him his first AMVCA. For his tragedy film The Happyness Limited, the lead actor Tope Tedela was voted as the Best Actor in Africa at the Africa Magic Viewers' Choice Awards (AMVCA).

Umoren later wrote and directed the critically acclaimed film Children of Mud which is loosely based on a real story. The film received 7 nominations at different international film festivals including: Nigeria Entertainment Awards (NEA) and the AMVCA. His next tragedy film Dear Bayo was screened in 11 film festivals and won 6 awards at the UK Nollywood Festival other international film festivals. Umoren also directed the film Lagos: Sex, Lies & Traffic which he co-wrote with Gbemisola Afolabi.

He then completed the production of the period drama The Herbert Macaulay Affair, a biopic about Herbert Macaulay, in 2018. In 2020, he made the drama series Channel 77.

== Filmography ==
Year	Film	Role	Genre	Ref.
2004	Hard Times	Director, writer	Film	
2007	The Station	Junior producer	TV series	
2007	Break the Bank	Producer	TV series	
2007	Don’t Forget The Lyrics	Junior producer	TV series	
2008	Project Fame	Junior producer	TV program	
2008	MTN Xtra Connect Game Show	Junior producer	TV series	
2008	MTV Advance Warning	Junior producer	TV series	
2009	Lemon Green	Director, writer	Film	
2009	Malta Guinness Street Dance	Junior producer	TV program	
2010	All Sorts Of Trouble	Director, writer	Film	
2013	Have A Nice Day	Director, writer	Film	
2015	Lagos: Sex, Lies & Traffic	Director, writer	Film	
2016	The Happyness Limited	Director, writer	Film	
2017	Children of Mud	Director, producer, writer	Film	
2018	Club			
2019	The Herbert Macaulay Affair	Director, producer	Film	
2020	Dear Bayo	Director, writer	Film	

== See also ==
- List of Nigerian film producers
- List of Nigerian film directors
