= Babatunde Kwaku Adadevoh =

Nigerian physician

4th Vice Chancellor of the University of Lagos
- In office November 1978 – 1980
- Preceded by: J. F. Ade Ajayi
- Succeeded by: Akinpelu Oludele Adesola

Personal details
- Born: 4 October 1933 Lagos, British Nigeria
- Died: 5 October 1997 (aged 64)
- Party: Non-Partisan
- Spouse: Deborah Regina McIntosh (m. 1956)
- Children: 4, including Ameyo Adadevoh
- Parents: Julius Gordon Kwasi Adadevoh (father); Sarah Abigail Idowu Macaulay (mother)
- Relatives: Sarah Forbes Bonetta (great-grandmother); Samuel Ajayi Crowther (great-great-grand father); Herbert Macaulay (grandfather); Bankole Cardoso (grandson)

Babatunde Kwaku Adadevoh (4 October 1933 – 5 October 1997) was a Nigerian physician, educational administrator and former Vice-chancellor of the University of Lagos, Nigeria. He was a professor of Chemical Pathology.

== Early life ==
He was born in Lagos, Nigeria to a Ghanaian father, Julius Gordon Kwasi Adadevoh and a Nigerian mother, Sarah Abigail Idowu Macaulay (the daughter of Herbert Macaulay and granddaughter of Sarah Forbes Bonetta).

== Education ==
Babatunde Kwaku attended Baptist Academy, Lagos and Igbobi College, Lagos, Nigeria. He studied medicine at the premier University of Ibadan College of Medicine and the University of Birmingham. He also attended the Royal Postgraduate Medical School in the Hammersmith Hospital, London.

== Career ==
He began his career in the General Hospital, Birmingham. He worked as a physician at Queen Elizabeth Hospital, Birmingham and the Hammersmith Hospital in London, where he was a house physician to Thomas Russell Cumming Fraser.

Between 1962 and 1964, he was a research fellow at Harvard Medical School and at Massachusetts General Hospital, Boston. In 1964, he then returned to Nigeria as a senior lecturer in medicine at the University of Lagos. He was then appointed professor of Chemical Pathology in 1968 at the University of Ibadan. He was the first Director of the Medical Research Council of Nigeria (now, Nigeria Institute of Medical Research). He was later appointed as the vice-chancellor of the University of Lagos in 1978 until he was succeeded by Akin O. Adesola in 1980. He was the first editor-in-chief of the Nigerian Journal of Medical Sciences and also the first Secretary to the Nigeria Medical Council Board in Physic (Medicine). In the year 1981, he was also appointed professor of Chemical Pathology at the newly created College of Medical Sciences at the University of Maiduguri, Nigeria. He was the forerunner of the National Postgraduate Medical College of Nigeria, which introduced the fellowship programme of specialisation for Nigerian doctors in internal medicine.

== Personal life ==
He was a gregarious, dapper and outgoing man. He also played very elegant cricket, receiving full colours for his school, university and the Nigerian national team. He married Deborah Regina McIntosh in Lagos in 1956. They had four children, three daughters, and a son. One of their daughters was the late Dr. Stella Shade Ameyo Adadevoh who was responsible for treating and containing Nigeria's Ebola virus index case, the Liberian-American, Patrick Sawyer.

== See also ==
- List of vice chancellors in Nigeria
