= A Place in the Stars =

2014 Nigerian thriller film

- Theatrical release poster
- Directed by: Steve Gukas
- Written by: Ita Hozaife; J. K. Amalou
- Produced by: Steve Gukas; Nosa Obayuwana
- Starring: Gideon Okeke; Segun Arinze; Matilda Obaseki; Yemi Blaq; Femi Branch; Dejumo Lewis
- Cinematography: Harald Beeker; John L. Demps Jr. Manu Lapière
- Edited by: Antonio Rui Ribeiro
- Music by: George Kallis
- Production companies: Natives Filmworks; Jungle FilmWorks
- Distributed by: Silverbird Film Distribution
- Release date: 14 November 2014
- Running time: 108 minutes
- Country: Nigeria
- Language: English
- Budget: ₦160 million (est)

A Place in the Stars is a 2014 Nigerian crime thriller film written by Ita Hozaife and J. K. Amalou, co-produced and directed by Steve Gukas. It stars Gideon Okeke, Segun Arinze, Matilda Obaseki, Yemi Blaq, Femi Branch and Dejumo Lewis. The film was inspired by the tenure of Late Professor Dora Akunyili as the Director General of the National Agency for Food and Drug Administration and Control (NAFDAC).

The film is set in 2006, and narrates the story of Kim Dakim (Gideon Okeke), a young lawyer who has information about the trafficking of counterfeit drugs and stands to make millions of dollars if he doesn't pass on the information. However, the drug baron, Diokpa Okonkwo (Segun Arinze) is ready to kill in order protect his thriving illegal trade and Kim has him to contend with, while battling with his conscience and everything he has been raised to believe is right.

== Plot ==
A lawyer gets a case he thinks will make him rich and encounters dangerous men willing to kill to protect a false medical drugs trade in Nigeria.

== Cast ==
- Gideon Okeke as Kim Dakim
- Segun Arinze as Diokpa Okonkwo
- Dejumo Lewis as Pa Dakim
- Matilda Obaseki as Tari
- Femi Branch as Young Pa Dakim
- Yemi Blaq as James
- Julian Mcdowell as James Prescot - MD Rasco Mining
- Armajit Deu as Veejay
- Amaka Mgbor as Vickie
- Ladi Alpha as Simi Dakim
- Zubairu J. Attah as Charles Coker
- Lantana Ahmed as Ngo Simi
- Edward Fom as Doctor
- Fiona Garba as Kim's Secretary
- Friday James as Kim's Security Man
- Tony Goodman as Aka

== Production ==
George Kallis conducting the ninety-piece symphony orchestra for A Place in the Stars in Budapest, Hungary

A Place in the Stars focuses on "how fake and adulterated medical drugs are being traded for billions of dollars". Gukas decided to make a film on fake drugs, having been inspired by the tenure of the now late Dora Akunyili as the Director General of the National Agency for Food and Drug Administration and Control (NAFDAC). According to him, the zeal and dedication of Akinyili helped a lot to reduce the prevalence of fake drugs in Nigeria to a minimum level at the time.

The film which was partly funded by Nigeria's National Film and Video Censors Board, is a co-production of Native Filmworks with Jungle FilmWorks, Massive Entertainment, Consolidated Media Associates, Pepper Fruit Consult, MichelAngelo Productions and T-Large Media. According to Gukas, the total amount spent on producing the film is over a million dollars. It was shot in Jos, Abuja and Lagos. The film's development through production took a period of five years. The director noted the funding style as the reason behind the long duration.

=== Music and soundtrack ===
The music was composed by George Kallis; Instrumentation for the music composition was done by a ninety-piece orchestra and it was recorded in Budapest, Hungary. The music score is majorly of an uplifting tempo. The theme song for the film "A Place in the Stars" by Jeremiah Gyang of Chocolate City music label was released on 21 September 2014, along with its music video.

== Promotion and release ==
Arinze, flagging Dr. Ameyo Adadevoh for his #APlaceInTheStars campaign

The film was officially announced to the press on 20 August 2014 at Freedom Park, Lagos Island. The official trailer for the film was unveiled at the event, before it was uploaded on YouTube the same day. Exclusive behind-the-scenes footage; including the making of the film, the music score and music video of the film's soundtrack were also screened for guests at the event. On 1 October, a social media campaign was launched on Twitter, which involves users, including celebrities, twitting the name of people who they think deserve a place in the stars, with the hash-tag "#APlaceInTheStars". A private screening was held for the film at the Four Points Sheraton Hotel, Victoria Island, Lagos on 12 October 2014. The film premiered on 7 November 2014 at Landmark Centre, Victoria Island, Lagos, and slated for a general release on 14 November.

== Reception ==
=== Critical reception ===
The films received generally negative critical reviews. Wilfred Okiche of YNaija says A Place in the Stars is "a disappointing film", faulting almost everything in it. He cited Gideon Okeke as an unengaging leading man, says the screenplay is not dramatic enough, and concludes : "Any director would have presented A Place in the stars in this way and it would be terrible. But Gukas, whose profile is enough to inspire certain lofty expectations, proceeds with this effort, to dash every single one of them. Nothing inspiring, entertaining or admirable about this [film]". Oris Aigbokhaevbolo of "True Nollywood Stories" gave 5.4 stars, also generally panning the film and Okeke's performance, but commended its motive. He concludes: "Okeke’s smug-plated acting aside, this is the trouble with A Place in the Stars: it is an NGO enlightenment campaign for television. Screenwriter Ita Hozaife’s and J.K Amalou’s hearts are in the right place, but their film is showing at the wrong space".

Amarachukwu Iwuala of 360Nobs criticized the scripting and continuity, but commended the music, commenting "The orchestra is so solemn that one is forced into sober reflections. The technical quality of the film is topnotch whilst many of the actors give sublime performances. [However,] A Place in the Stars is not exceptional, coming from the director of Keeping Faith. Ukamaka of Olisa TV says the film seems like a documentary, which is overwhelmed by the beautiful cinematography; she concludes: "Though A Place In The Stars subscribes to a standard all its own, which is a triumph, it could have been better if the story wasn’t so linear [...] But A Place in the Stars stands tall among its peers; daring to pull off impressive stunts and starting an important conversation".

=== Accolades ===
A Place in the Stars was nominated in eleven categories at the 2015 Africa Magic Viewers Choice Awards, and won the award for "Best Drama Film".

Complete list of Awards
| Award | Category | Recipients and nominees | Result |
|---|---|---|---|
| Multichoice (2015 Africa Magic Viewers Choice Awards) | Best Movie of 2014 | Steve Gukas | Nominated |
| Multichoice (2015 Africa Magic Viewers Choice Awards) | Best Movie (Drama) | Steve Gukas | Won |
| Multichoice (2015 Africa Magic Viewers Choice Awards) | Best Movie Director | Steve Gukas | Nominated |
| Multichoice (2015 Africa Magic Viewers Choice Awards) | Best Supporting Actor | Segun Arinze | Nominated |
| Multichoice (2015 Africa Magic Viewers Choice Awards) | Best Actress in a Drama | Amaka Mgbor | Nominated |
| Multichoice (2015 Africa Magic Viewers Choice Awards) | Best Actor in a Drama | Gideon Okeke | Nominated |
| Multichoice (2015 Africa Magic Viewers Choice Awards) | Best Cinematography | John Demps, Harald Beeker & Manuel Lapiere | Nominated |
| Multichoice (2015 Africa Magic Viewers Choice Awards) | Best Make-Up Artist | Chinwem Elevoh & Sandra Udoewah | Nominated |
| Multichoice (2015 Africa Magic Viewers Choice Awards) | Best Sound Editing | Susan Penington | Nominated |
| Multichoice (2015 Africa Magic Viewers Choice Awards) | Best Video Editing | Antonio Rui Ribeiro | Nominated |
| Multichoice (2015 Africa Magic Viewers Choice Awards) | Best Drama Writer | Ita Hozaife, J.K. Amalou | Nominated |

== See also ==
- List of Nigerian films of 2014
