= Dejumo Lewis =

Nigerian actor (1943–2023)

- Born: 1943; Lagos State, Colony and Protectorate of Nigeria
- Died: 23 December 2023 (aged 80)
- Citizenship: Nigerian
- Occupations: Actor; producer; director; dramatist; film maker; communications consultant
- Years active: 1964–?
- Notable work: The Village Headmaster (1964)

Dejumo Lewis (1943 – 23 December 2023) was a Nigerian film and television actor, famous for the Kabiyesi role in The Village Headmaster, Nigeria’s longest-running television soap opera shown on NTA from 1968 to 1988 that starred Justus Esiri and Femi Robinson. Lewis died on 23 December 2023, at the age of 80.

== Filmography ==
- The Village Headmaster
- Agogo Eewo
- A Place in the Stars
