= Olusegun Olusola =

Nigerian television producer (1935–2012)

- Born: 18 March 1935; Iperu Remo, Ogun State, Nigeria
- Died: 21 June 2012 (aged 77)
- Occupations: diplomat; television producer; director; broadcaster
- Years active: 1955–2012
- Notable work: The Village Headmaster

Chief Olusegun "Segun" Olusola (Ṣẹgun Oluṣọla; 18 March 1935 – 21 June 2012) was a Nigerian television producer, broadcaster and diplomat. He was the writer and executive producer of The Village Headmaster, Nigeria’s longest running television soap opera that stars Justus Esiri and Femi Robinson.

== Early life ==
Chief Olusola was born in Iperu Remo, a town in Ogun State, southwestern Nigeria. He attended Remo Secondary School, Sagamu, where he obtained the West African Senior School Certificate in 1947 before he proceeded to the University of Pittsburgh, Pittsburgh, where he obtained a bachelor's degree.

== Career ==
He returned to Nigeria in 1955 to join the services of the Federal Radio Corporation of Nigeria (FRCN) as Broadcasting Officer. He left FRCN in 1959 to join the services of the Nigerian Television Authority, where he rose to the position of an executive producer in 1964, the same year he scripted The Village Headmaster. In 1973, he became the Vice Chairman of the Broadcasting Organisation of Nigeria's Planning Committee for the Second All African Games. In 1965, he became the Controller of programs at the Nigerian Broadcasting Commission. He served in that capacity for nine years before he was appointed Director of Programmes at NTA Lagos in 1974, a position he held for two years before he became the General Manager in 1976. In 1978, he was appointed as Director for nine years. In 1987, he was appointed as Ambassador to Ethiopia and the Organisation of African Unity by General Ibrahim Babangida, the former military head of state. Olusola died on 21 June 2012 at the age of 77 after a brief illness.

== Books ==
He had authored several books, among them The Village Headmaster (1977), Some Notes on 20 Years of Television in Nigeria (1979), Performing Arts, Broadcasting, Culture and National Development (2004), and Footprints in the Sands of Time (2005). In addition, he was cited by peers and several others and in 2002, Akin Iroko wrote a book that centred on his biography.
