= Mighty Joe =

Nigerian bandit

- Isiaka Busari
- Born: 1936; Lagos, Lagos State
- Died: 6 June 1973 (aged 36–37)
- Cause of death: Executed by firing squad
- Citizenship: Nigerian
- Occupation: Armed robber
- Years active: 1971 — 1973
- Employer: Dr. Ishola
- Opponent: Nigerian Government
- Status: Executed
- Criminal charges: Genocide; Illegal possession of arms
- Penalty: Death
- Accomplices: Bashiru Fatola; Dr. Ishola; Kayode Williams
- Comments: "May God bless everybody, both my friends and enemies. Tell my wife, my mother and my in-law to keep fit."

Details
- Span of crimes: 1971–1973
- Country: Nigeria
- State: Lagos State
- Locations: Lagos; Idi-Oro
- Date apprehended: 1973

Isiaka Busari, known predominantly as Mighty Joe, was a Nigerian bandit. He was the sidekick to Ishola Oyenusi. After the death of Oyenusi, Mighty Joe took charge of the gang, mostly terrorizing the south western part of Nigeria. He was executed by firing squad in 1973.

== Early life ==
Mighty Joe was born in 1936 in Lagos, Lagos State into a family of seven. Due to financial constraints, Mighty Joe became a dropout from primary school. He joined Dr. Ishola in armed robbery operations. After the death of Dr. Ishola, he took charge of the gang; recruiting ex-military to aid him carry out his operations. Before he was shot, he converted to Islam.

== Death ==
Mighty Joe was arrested on 1973 while trying to snatch ₦10 from a bar attendant called Michael Osayunana. After trials, on 6 June 1973, a convoy drove him from Kirikiri Maximum Security Prison to Lagos Bar Beach where he was executed.

== Controversy ==
His death raised a controversy as some people thought that his execution was a set-up aided by Daily Times because of fuss between Mighty Joe and the owners of the newspaper.
