= Patrick Sawyer =

Index case of the Ebola virus disease in Nigeria during the 2014 outbreak

- Born: Patrick Oliver Sawyer; 1974
- Died: 24 July 2014 (aged 40); Obalende, Nigeria
- Occupation: Lawyer

Patrick Oliver Sawyer (c. 1974 – 24 July 2014) was a Liberian-American lawyer who was notable for being the index case for the introduction of Ebola virus disease into Nigeria during the West African Ebola epidemic in 2014. Sawyer was a naturalized U.S. citizen who lived in Coon Rapids, Minnesota. He has been variously described as working for the Liberian Ministry of Finance and for the mining company ArcelorMittal as their national manager for public health. He was aged 40 at the time of his death.

== Ebola infection and death ==
On 9 July 2014, Sawyer informed ArcelorMittal management at the Buchanan office that he had been exposed to the Ebola virus. They referred his case to the Liberian Ministry of Health for observation.

However, Sawyer utilized an upcoming conference in Calabar, Cross River State, Nigeria, to petition the Liberian Finance Ministry to attend as an "ambassador." His departure was approved. The Liberian government has apologized for the lack of communication between offices and for not listing Sawyer's name at the airport.

On 20 July 2014, Sawyer flew via ASKY Airlines from James Spriggs Payne Airport in Monrovia, Liberia to Murtala Muhammed International Airport in Lagos, Nigeria, with a stopover at Lomé in Togo. He was subsequently described as having appeared to be "terribly ill" when he left Monrovia.

He collapsed upon arriving at Murtala Muhammed International Airport, Ikeja. A protocol officer of Economic Community of West African States (ECOWAS) was there to greet him. The officer drove Sawyer in an ECOWAS pool car to First Consultant Hospital, Obalende, Lagos, where he later died on 24 July.

In response, the Nigerian government observed all of Sawyer's contacts for signs of infection and increased surveillance at all entry points to the country. On 6 August, the Nigerian health minister told reporters, "Yesterday the first known Nigerian to die of Ebola was recorded. This was one of the nurses that attended to the Liberian. The other five [newly confirmed] cases are being treated at an isolation ward."

It was later reported that at the time he flew, Sawyer was already under surveillance for Ebola infection but had been cleared by the Finance Ministry of the Liberian government to leave for the ECOWAS conference in Calabar.

On 19 August, it was reported that the doctor who treated Sawyer, Ameyo Adadevoh, had also died of Ebola. Adadevoh was posthumously praised for preventing Sawyer from leaving the hospital at the time of diagnosis, thereby playing a key role in curbing the spread of the virus in Nigeria.

== Aftermath ==
The infection brought into the country by Sawyer resulted in 19 confirmed cases of Ebola infection and eight deaths. As of October 2014, the Nigerian Ebola outbreak was regarded as having been contained. On October 20, 2014, Nigeria was announced as Ebola-free by the WHO, following two incubation periods without any further reports of infection.

Sawyer's travel to Nigeria provoked anger there towards the Liberian authorities who allowed him to fly out of Liberia despite being unwell. First Consultant Hospital leadership described Sawyer's behavior in ward as a "deceptive" and "intentional" attempt to spread the infection as widely as possible — Sawyer denied any exposure to Ebola and mobilized diplomatic pressure on the hospital to discharge him from the hospital in spite of showing severe symptoms.

There was also suspicion towards American authorities as Sawyer was a United States citizen. Some believed his arrival was not an accident, but a deliberate attempt to infect the Nigerian population, especially when direct requests came from the Liberian authorities to release him from quarantine in hospital despite him clearly being ill.

Sawyer's case and the successful containment of the outbreak by Adadevoh and other medical staff form the basis of the 2016 Nigerian drama thriller film 93 Days.
