= The Village Headmaster =

- Genre: Drama
- Written by: Olusegun Olusola
- Directed by: Dejumo Lewis
- Starring: Ted Mukoro (Headmaster #1); Femi Robinson (Headmaster #2); Justus Esiri (Headmaster #3); Chris Iheuwa (Headmaster #4)
- Country of origin: Nigeria
- Original languages: English; Yoruba; Nigerian Pidgin

Production
- Executive producer: Olusegu Olusola
- Producers: Sanya Dosunmu, Dejumo Lewis
- Production location: Nigeria
- Running time: 45 minutes

Original release
- Network: NTA
- Release: 1964

The Village Headmaster (later renamed The New Village Headmaster) is a Nigerian television drama series created by Olusegun Olusola and produced by Dejumo Lewis. Originally a radio drama series, the programme was Nigeria’s longest-running television soap opera shown on the NTA from 1968 to 1988, and starred Ted Mukoro as the original title character. The television series was developed by Nigerian Broadcasting Corporation, and is considered one of the early successes of television drama in the country.

In 2021, a new revival of the show was announced, with Chris Iheuwa in the lead role of the headmaster. A number of actors from the earlier series also returned.

== Plot ==
The Village Headmaster is set in the fictitious Yoruba village of Oja, with plot lines dealing with social problems and effect of government policies. The television series was produced after Nigeria gained independence, and was the first major television drama with an ensemble cast from different ethnic groups. Nigerian Pidgin was mixed with standard English and Yoruba as the Oja residents' language of choice, with most scenes occurring in the Oloja of Oja's palace, the headmaster's school, and Amebo's palm wine shack.

== Cast ==
(Source)

- Ted Mukoro as Headmaster #1 - an archaic school headmaster
- Femi Robinson - Headmaster #2 (replaced Mukoro)
- Justus Esiri - Headmaster #3 (replaced Robinson)
- Dejumo Lewis - Kabiyesi, Oja's traditional ruler
- Elsie Olushola - headmaster's wife (Clara Fagade)
- Albert Egbe - Lawyer Odunuga
- Ibidun Allison - Amebo, village gossip
- Jab Adu - Bassey Okon, supplies store owner
- Funsho Adeolu - Senior Chief
- Joe Layode - Teacher Garuba
- Charles Awurum
- Albert Kosemasi - Gorimapa

== Production ==
The drama was produced in 1958 and aired on radio for six years before its format transitioned into a television series on NBC TV Lagos (later NTA). A full series began in 1968 with an initial order of 13 episodes and ran until 1988. The original recordings are not known to have survived. The 1964 master-script by Segun Olusola was published by Ariya Productions in 1977 with a cover drawing by cartoonist Josy Ajiboye.

== 2021 Revival ==
In a 2013 interview with the Nigerian Tribune, Tunde Oloyede, who produced 364 episodes of the series stated: "Before the Ambassador (Olusola) died, we had been working on bringing back The Village Headmaster in three possible formats. On film, on stage, and back to television."

In 2021, three decades after the short-lived 1991 revival, a new series of The Village Headmaster was announced. Filming had commenced in 2020, and trailers were released on the NTA and YouTube. The revamped series is a collaboration with the NTA and Wale Adenuga Productions, and is expected to air in April 2021. As majority of the previous cast are either deceased or retired, most roles have been recast, notably with Chris Iheuwa who is the fourth actor in the lead role. Dejumo Lewis reprises his role as the village's chief, as do Ibidun Allison (Amebo), Dele Osawe (Teacher Fadele), Dan Imoudu (Dagbolu), and Melville Obriango (Teacher Oghene). New actors include veterans Rachel Oniga (Iyalode) and Jide Kosoko (Eleyinmi), and Monica Friday (Tega Abaga).

== Popular culture ==
The Village Headmaster is responsible for coining several terms now part of Nigerian culture. "Amebo" is used to refer to rumourmongers, and in 2019, actress Ibidun Allison appeared as her Village Headmaster character Amebo in an advertising campaign for telecommunications company Globacom. The term "Gorimapa", after Kabiyesi's servant, is a common nickname for follicly-challenged men, and "Okoro" is used to describe Igbo stereotypes.
