= Doreen Jones =

Welsh casting director

Doreen Jones (24 May 1940 – 19 February 2017) was a Welsh casting director, casting for successful TV dramas including Brideshead Revisited.

== Life ==
She was born in Colwyn Bay, eldest daughter of Geoffrey Jones, a doctor, and his wife Rebecca (née Wright). She was educated at Dollar Academy in Scotland, and afterwards went to a secretarial college in Edinburgh. From 1960 she worked at Associated Television; in 1972 she was appointed casting director at Granada Television, where she became in 1978 head of casting. From 1987 she was freelance.

At Granada she cast Brideshead Revisited (1981), with Jeremy Irons and Laurence Olivier; The Ebony Tower (1984) also featured Laurence Olivier. Other dramas include The Good Soldier (1981); early episodes of Prime Suspect, featuring Helen Mirren; Wallander; and The Honourable Woman (2014).

In 1997 she was a founding member of the Casting Directors' Guild. She received an Emmy Award for the TV series Elizabeth I (2005).

Doreen Jones died in 2017. Derek Granger, producer of Brideshead Revisited, wrote: "Doreen had a sharp instinct for the subtle chemistry that can exist between actors and knew well how players could spark off each other."
