= Loving Rona =

2021 Nigerian romantic drama film

- Directed by: Luke Aire Oyovbaire
- Produced by: Alex Odinigwe and Chidi Umeoji
- Starring: Meg Otanwa; Gideon Okeke; Fiona Garba; Jeff (Bankz) Nweke; Erica Bale Opia
- Production company: Lex Sparkles production
- Release date: 20 August 2021; (Nigeria)
- Country: Nigeria
- Language: English

Loving Rona, is a 2021 Nigerian romantic drama film directed by Luke Aire Oyovbaire and co-produced by Alex Odinigwe and Chidi Umeoji. The film stars Meg Otanwa and Gideon Okeke in the lead roles whereas Fiona Garba, Jeff (Bankz) Nweke and Erica Bale Opia made supportive roles. The film deals with a love affair between a young wealthy businesswoman Rona and her Garden boy Benny after they planned to stop the romance between Alex, Rona's ex fiancée and Jackie, his supposed masseur.

The film made its premier on 20 August 2021. The film received mixed reviews from critics.

== Cast ==
- Meg Otanwa as Rona Adams
- Gideon Okeke as Benny Ramsey
- Fiona Garba as Jackie
- Jeff Bankz Nweke as Alex
- Erica Bale Opia as Emma
- Ummi Baba Ahmed as Judith
- Jide Bolarinwa
- Patricia Egbon

== Awards and nominations ==
| Year | Award | Category | Recipient | Result | Ref |
|---|---|---|---|---|---|
| 2022 | Africa Magic Viewers' Choice Awards | Best Actor in A Comedy | Gideon Okeke | Pending | |
