= Assassin (2015 film) =

- Film poster
- Directed by: J. K. Amalou
- Written by: J. K. Amalou
- Produced by: J. K. Amalou
- Starring: Danny Dyer; Holly Weston; Martin Kemp; Gary Kemp; Robert Cavanah
- Cinematography: Haider Zafar
- Edited by: Will Gilbey; St. John O'Rorke; Toby Quickenden
- Music by: Rufus Quickenden
- Distributed by: Silver Leaf Pictures
- Release date: 9 March 2015
- Running time: 82 minutes
- Country: United Kingdom
- Language: English

Assassin is a British independent thriller film directed by J. K. Amalou and starring Danny Dyer. The film was released straight to DVD without a cinematic release.

== Plot ==
Hitman Jamie (Danny Dyer) has been hired to kill a man, a not unfamiliar prospect for him. However things grow complicated when he ends up falling for the daughter of his hit, especially after the deed is done and she begins to question who killed her father and why. This puts her in the path of John and Lee Alberts, the two gangsters that hired Jamie, requiring him to protect his new love while also trying to avoid the two brothers.

== Cast ==
- Danny Dyer as Jamie
- Holly Weston as Chloe
- Martin Kemp as Lee Alberts
- Gary Kemp as John Alberts
- Robert Cavanah as Tony Boyd
- Deborah Moore as Laura Boyd

== Production ==
Filming began 9 September 2013 in London.

== Reception ==
Flickering Myth gave the film two stars, stating that it "will probably prove to be quite popular with those into their British crime movies as it looks pretty good with some stunning wide shots of London in various different lights, and for Danny Dyer it’s something of a step up from his usual performance and will hopefully be seen as a defining moment for him, but otherwise Assassin is a little bit too underwhelming in the areas where it should have been stronger." Movie Talk panned Assassin, writing "Danny Dyer's hard man whizzes to and from his assignments on a high-powered motorbike, but this crashingly dull low-budget British crime thriller couldn't be more pedestrian." Charlie Lyne of The Guardian wrote, "Dyer doesn’t so much go through the motions in the role as plead with the audience to save him the bother and recall the motions from last time." Matt Glasby of Total Film rated it 3/5 and wrote that although it is not enough to rehabilitate Dyer's reputation, "anyone looking for po-faced, paunch-free action could do much worse".
