= Bankole Cardoso =

Nigerian entrepreneur

- Born: Lagos
- Education: Boston College; Columbia Business School
- Occupation: Entrepreneur
- Known for: Co-founder of Easy Taxi Nigeria
- Parent(s): Afolabi Emmanuel Cardoso and Ameyo Adadevoh
- Awards: Forbes 30 (2014)

Bankole Cardoso is a Nigerian entrepreneur and co-founder of Easy Taxi Nigeria. Easy Taxi provides a safe, convenient, and free platform that connects taxi drivers, operators, and their clients. In 2014, he was listed by Forbes as one of the 30 most promising entrepreneurs in Africa in recognition of his achievements. In 2015, Cardoso stepped down from his role at Easy Taxi Nigeria. He later became Managing Director of Delta40 Venture Studio in West Africa, where he partners with early-stage founders to build and scale climate tech ventures across Africa.

== Early life and education ==
Cardoso was born in Lagos to a banker, Afolabi Emmanuel Cardoso, and a medical doctor, Ameyo Adadevoh. He received his mother’s posthumous award in 2014 at the Civic Centre, Victoria Island, after she was honored by Women in Management, Business, and Public Service (WIMBIZ). His father belongs to the Amaro community of Lagos, while his mother was a descendant of a long line of prominent Nigerians that began with King Abiodun. He attended Corona School, Ikoyi for his primary school, and Grange Secondary School, both in Lagos, before going to Rugby School in the United Kingdom for his GCSE and A-Levels.

== Career ==
He moved to New York City to work with Carlyle Group and as an associate at PricewaterhouseCoopers (PWC), where he earned his CPA (Certified Public Accountant) credentials.

=== Easy Taxi Nigeria ===
Cardoso started Easy Taxi in Nigeria in 2013 because he wanted a simple way to aid commuting in Lagos. He also mentioned that he hoped to standardize pricing of taxis around the country. Easy Taxi under his watch grew to be one of the most used taxi hailing apps in Lagos as well as Abuja . Easy Taxi is a free smartphone application that allows users to request taxis in the easiest way possible. The app uses GPS to connect users to the drivers closest to them and then sends the user the drivers’ information and allows the user to track the driver on the map in real time. Present in 30 countries, Nigeria was the first country to launch it in Africa and currently has a network of over 400 drivers in Lagos with services extended to Abuja.

Although still affiliated with the company, he stepped down as the CEO in January, 2015
