= Saro, the musical =

Nigerian Broadway-style musical

Saro: the musical
- Original language: English Language
- Music by: Ayo Ajayi
- Characters: Azeez, the leader Laitan, the thinker Obaro, the dreamer Efe, the charmer Don Ceeto
- Genre: Musical

Premiere
- Place: Lagos, Nigeria
- SARO: the musical

Saro the Musical is a Nigerian Broadway-style musical showcase produced by Bolanle Austen Peters Production.

== Plot ==
Set in modern day Lagos, Saro portrays the lives of four young men who are determined to become successful despite frustration and perennial lack of opportunities to explore their musical talents and realise their dreams. It tells a story of their journey from the comfort of their multi-ethnic villages seeking a better life in the city of Lagos, which is seen as a land of freedom and opportunities. On getting to Lagos, they find that not all that glitters is gold and ‘blowing’ will take more than just a stroke of luck. Having just arrived in Yaba, they are mugged by agberos and end up in prison alongside their attackers following an altercation. Their dreams of making it appear bleak until the smooth-talking and stylish Don Ceeto swaggers in. Don Ceeto takes the boys home and with some help from Derry Black, he cleans them up and sets them up on the road to stardom.

Azeez finds chemistry with Aunty Just Jane who is Don Ceeto’s assistant while Efe is persistently pursued by the Lagos babe, Ronke.

Laitan wished he could stay with Rume but she convinced him to go and find success so that he could come back to prove to her father that he was capable of marrying his daughter. Staying behind in the village, with her disapproving father and the threat of being married to the Chief’s son hanging over her is Rume.

== Score ==
The musical score ranged from the 70s High Life and Afrobeat to contemporary Afrobeats, Igbo and Yoruba gospel songs to Eyo masquerade songs. The original songs were written by Kehinde Oretimehin Solomon and the musical selections were directed by Ayo Ajayi.

The first song is a Yoruba ballad titled ‘Ma gbagbe mi’. This utterly emotional and mind blowing song was written by Kehinde Oretimehin Solomon and has been performed by many classical singers across the world

== Cast ==
- Gideon Okeke - Azeez, the leader
- Patrick Diabuah - Laitan, the thinker
- Paul Ifeanyi Alumona - Obaro, the dreamer
- Paolo Sisiano - Efe, the charmer
- Bimbo Manuel - Don Ceeto
- Dolapo Oni
- Ade Laoye - Aunty ‘Just Jane’
- Lami Phillips - Derry Black
- Oshuwe Tunde-Imoyo - Ronke
- Kaline Akinkugbe - Rume
- Kunle Afolayan - Rume’s father

== Production ==
SARO the musical was produced by Bolanle Austen-Peters Productions (BAP) as its first production. It played at Muson Centre in December 2014 and April 2015. It is also the first Nigerian musical that was performed at London’s West End and Shaw Theatre.

It was sponsored by the arts and culture initiative of the MTN Foundation.

The production involved a 100 member crew including both international and local professionals ranging from the directors, producers, musicians, actors/actresses, dancers and choreographers.

Ayo Ajayi served as the music director, with Kehinde Oretimehin Solomon as original score writer
