= 2006 British Academy Television Craft Awards =

Technical achievements in television awards ceremony

7th British Academy Television Craft Awards
- Date: 19 May 2006
- Site: The Dorchester, Mayfair, UK
- Hosted by: Jon Culshaw

The British Academy Television Craft Awards of 2006 are presented by the British Academy of Film and Television Arts (BAFTA) and were held on 19 May 2006 at The Dorchester, Mayfair, the ceremony was hosted by Jon Culshaw for the second year in a row.

== Winners and nominees ==
Winners will be listed first and highlighted in boldface.

Best Director	Best Writer
**Brian Percival – Much Ado About Nothing**; Joe Ahearne – Doctor Who; Simon Cellan Jones – The Queen's Sister; Justin Chadwick – Bleak House	**Peter Kosminsky – The Government Inspector**; Andrew Davies – Bleak House; Russell T Davies – Doctor Who; Ricky Gervais, Stephen Merchant – Extras
Best Breakthrough Talent	Best Original Television Music
**Lee Phillips – How to Start Your Own Country**; Dan Edge – Israel and the Arabs: Elusive Peace; Misha Manson-Smith – High Spirits with Shirley Ghostman; Edward Thomas – Doctor Who	**Elizabeth I – Rob Lane**; Casanova – Murray Gold; The Girl in The Café – Nicholas Hooper; The Government Inspector – Jocelyn Pook
Best New Media Developer	Best Make-Up and Hair Design
**How To Start Your Own Country/Citizen TV – Lee Phillips, Julian Pearson, Patrick Cameron**; All New Cosmetic Surgery Live (Mobile Streaming) – Morgan Holt, Genevieve Dersley, Pasa Mustafa; Dr Who: Attack Of The Graske (Interactive Red Button Game) – Jo Pearce, Andrew Whitehouse; Lost Untold (Website) – Janine Smith, Mark Limb, Tracy Blacher	**Help – Vanessa White, Neill Gorton**; Casanova – Christine Allsopp; Elizabeth I – Fae Hammond; Bleak House – Daniel Phillips
Best Costume Design	Best Production Design
**Bleak House – Andrea Galer**; To the Ends of the Earth – Rosalind Ebbutt; The Queen's Sister – James Keast; Elizabeth I – Mike O'Neill	**Bleak House – Simon Elliott**; Rome – Joseph Bennett; Elizabeth I – Eve Stewart; To the Ends of the Earth – Donal Woods
Best Photography and Lighting - Fiction/Entertainment	Best Photography - Factual
**The Girl in the Café – Chris Seager**; To the Ends of the Earth – Ulf Brantas; Twenty Thousand Streets Under the Sky – John Daly; Bleak House – Kieran McGuigan	**Tsunami: 7 Hours On Boxing Day – Paul Otter**; A Picture of Britain – Fred Fabre; Real Families: My Skin Could Kill Me – Chris Holland; Michael Palin And The Mystery Of Hammershoi – Neville Kidd
Best Editing - Fiction/Entertainment	Best Editing - Factual
**Bleak House – Paul Knight**; Casanova – Nick Arthurs; To the Ends of the Earth – Philip Kloss; The Ghost Squad – Adam Recht	**The Year London Blew Up: 1974 – Paul Binns**; Born in the USSR: 21 Up – Kim Horton; 49 Up – Kim Horton; Jamie's School Dinners – Sunshine Jackson
Best Sound - Fiction/Entertainment	Best Sound - Factual
**Colditz – Sound Team**; To the Ends of the Earth – Paul Hamblin, Rory Farnan, Craig Butters, Clive Derbyshire; Bleak House – Sound Team; Spooks – Sound Team	**Tsunami: 7 Hours On Boxing Day – Ben Baird, Gregor Lyon, Brian Howell**; Holocaust: A Music Memorial Film From Auschwitz – Ben Baird, Mike Hatch; The Genius Of Beethoven – Ben Baird, Andy Rose, Tony Meering; Life in the Undergrowth – Sound Team
Best Visual Effects	Best Titles
**Hiroshima: BBC History of World War II – Red Vision, Mike Tucker, Gareth Edwards**; Walking with Monsters – Framestore Team; Rome – Barrie Hemsley, James Madigan, Joe Pavlo; Supervolcano – Lola	**Life in the Undergrowth – Mick Connaire**; Hustle – Berger and Wyse; Jamie's School Dinners – Matt Utber; Rome – Angus Wall

=== Special awards ===
- **Eileen Diss**

=== Interactive Innovation ===
- **BBC Open Earth Archive**

== See also ==
- 2006 British Academy Television Awards
