= Children of Mud =

2017 Nigerian film

- Directed by: Imoh Umoren
- Screenplay by: Imoh Umoren
- Story by: Imoh Umoren
- Produced by: Wale Boje; Ify Egbera
- Starring: Liz Benson; Matilda Obaseki; Bassey Keppy Ekpeyong
- Release date: 21 July 2017
- Running time: 83 minutes
- Country: Nigeria
- Language: English

Children of Mud is a 2017 Nigerian drama film written and directed by Imoh Umoren. The film stars Liz Benson and Matilda Obaseki in the lead roles while the film marked the fourth directorial venture of Imoh Umoren. The plot of the film is based on the concern about homeless children in Nigeria. The film had its theatrical release in Nigeria on 21 July 2017 and received positive reviews. The film won few nominations at award ceremonies.

== Cast ==
- Liz Benson as Annie
- Matilda Obaseki as Aniesin
- Raphael Jackson as Miracle
- Mariam Kayode as Emem
- Sunday Afolabi as Prophet
- Christian Paul as Saheed
- Bassey Ekpenyong as Healer
- Elvis Duke as Driver
- Ezikeoha Nzube as Man
- Kayode Titilola as Mmakamba
- Felix Ukairo as Remi
- Akinfolurin Titilayo as Eno
- Adedokun Philip as Vice Principal
- Joy Nmezi as Usher 1
- Silva Nkwocha as Usher 2
- Ojo Oluwatobiloba as Teacher

== Synopsis ==
Kicked out by their aunt, Emem and her blind brother Miracle are forced onto the unforgiving streets, chasing the faintest glimmer of hope.

== Awards and nominations ==
Year	Award	Category	Result
2018	2018 Nigeria Entertainment Awards	Best Picture	Nominated
2018	6th Africa Magic Viewers' Choice Awards	Best Actress - Mariam Kayode	Nominated
