= Corona School, Ikoyi =

Location
- 6 Mekunwen Road; Ikoyi; Lagos, Lagos State; Nigeria
- 6°26′41.9″N 3°26′13.8″E

Information
- Type: Private school Day School
- Established: 1960
- School board: Corona Schools' Trust Council
- Local authority: Lagos State Ministry of Education
- Category: Primary School
- Head of school: Mrs. Funlola Olorunishola
- Years taught: 1-6
- Gender: Co-educational
- Age: 5 to 11
- Enrollment: 575
- Houses: Crane, Weaver, Kingfisher, Heron

Corona School, Ikoyi is a co-educational independent school for children from ages 5 to 11. The school is a member of the Council of British International Schools, the Association of International Schools in Africa and governed by the Corona Schools' Trust Council.

== History ==
The School was established in February 1960 and exercises a British and Nigerian curriculum. The school is also a member of the schools rugby league in Lagos, and one of Zenith Bank's Swimming competitors.

== Heads of School ==
- Mrs Jean Abili (1960–1998)
- Mrs Catherine Adigwe (1998–2002)
- Mrs Chika Nwokolo (2002–2003)
- Mrs Bolanle Olubunmi (2003–2007)
- Mrs Amelia Dafeta (2007–2017)
- Mrs. Onafeso Adenike (2017–2022)
- Mrs. Funlola Olorunishola (since 2022)

== Notable alumni ==
- Professor Yemi Osinbajo(14th Vice President of Nigeria)
- Senator Udoma Udo Udoma(Nigerian Politician)
- Lynxxx (Musician)
- Desmond Majekodunmi (Environmentalist)
- Bankole Cardoso (Entrepreneur)
- Yemi Cardoso (Governor of the Central Bank of Nigeria)
- Bruce Ovbiagele (Award-winning Neurologist, Editor, Scientist, and Healthcare Leader)
