= Kayode Williams =

Nigerian minister

Solomon Olumuyiwa Kayode Williams commonly known as Kayode Williams is a Nigerian minister, prison reform activist and ex-convict. He was among the gang of Dr. Ishola which included Mighty Joe.

== Life ==
Willams was among the gang of Ishola Oyenusi aka Dr. Ishola. He was arrested alongside Ishola in 1971. He converted to Christianity while serving a 10-year jail term. Afterwards, he became an activist for prison reform in Nigeria.
