= 93 Days =

2016 film directed by Steve Gukas

- Directed by: Steve Gukas
- Written by: Paul S. Rowlston
- Based on: Ebola virus disease in Nigeria
- Produced by: Bolanle Austen-Peters; Dotun Olakunri; Pemon Rami; Steve Gukas
- Starring: Bimbo Akintola; Danny Glover; Somkele Idhalama; Bimbo Manuel; Seun Kentebe; Alastair Mackenzie; Charles Okafor; Gideon Okeke; Sola Oyebade; Tim Reid
- Cinematography: Yinka Edward
- Edited by: Antonio Rui Ribeiro
- Music by: George Kallis
- Production companies: Native FilmWorks; Michel Angelo Production; Bolanle Austen-Peters Production
- Release date: 16 September 2016
- Running time: 118 minutes
- Country: Nigeria
- Language: English

93 Days is a 2016 Nigerian drama thriller film directed and co-produced by Steve Gukas. The film recounts the 2014 Ebola outbreak in Nigeria and its successful containment by health workers at a Lagos Hospital. It stars Bimbo Akintola, Danny Glover and Bimbo Manuel with joint-production by Native FilmWorks, Michel Angelo Production, and Bolanle Austen-Peters Production.

93 Days is dedicated to Ameyo Adadevoh, a Nigerian physician who played a key role in the containment of Ebola in Nigeria.

== Plot ==
On 20 July 2014, Patrick Sawyer, a Liberian-American diplomat, arrives in Lagos, Nigeria. He was immediately taken to First Consultants Medical Center after suffering from worsening symptoms. One of his attending physicians, Dr. Ameyo Adadevoh, is concerned that he may have Ebola, even though Sawyer denies the suggestion; nevertheless, she decides to quarantine Sawyer and asks her staff to exercise caution when tending to him.

The next afternoon, the test results return, confirming that Sawyer has Ebola. Word travels quickly that there is a potential first caseof an Ebola patient in Lagos, and soon news organizations around the world began broadcasting the news. Nigeria immediately starts preparations for an Ebola epidemic.

Dr. Adadevoh meets with Dr. Wasiu Gbadamosi, who is in charge of the Yaba infectious disease facility, and Dr. David Brett-Major from the World Health Organization. She finds the Yasu facility is under-equipped to handle Ebola patients. On July 25, the physicians discover that Sawyer has died. The First Consultants Medical Center begins enhanced precautions and monitors its staff for signs and symptoms of Ebola.

The story centers on the sacrifices made by men and women who risked their lives to make sure the Ebola virus was contained, before it became an epidemic.

== Cast ==
- Seun Ajayi as Dr. Niyi Fadipe
- Bimbo Akintola as Doctor Ameyo Adadevoh
- Zara Udofia Ejoh as Nurse Justina Echelonu
- Keppy Ekpeyong Bassey as Patrick Sawyer
- Charles Etubiebi as Bankole Cardoso
- Danny Glover as Dr. Benjamin Ohiaeri
- Somkele Iyamah-Idhalama as Dr. Ada Igonoh
- Seun Kentebe as Godwin Igonoh
- Alastair Mackenzie as Doctor David Brett-Major
- Bimbo Manuel as Wasiu Gbadamosi
- Charles Okafor as Afolabi Cardoso
- Gideon Okeke as Dr. Morris Ibeawuchi
- Sola Oyebade as The Ambassador
- Tim Reid as Dr. Adeniyi Jones
