= Matilda Obaseki =

Nigerian actress (born 1986)

- Born: 19 March 1986 (age 40); Benin City
- Citizenship: Nigerian
- Education: University of Benin
- Occupations: Film Actress and Scriptwriter
- Years active: 2007-till present
- Notable work: Tinsel
- Spouse: Arnold Mozia

Matilda Obaseki is a Nigerian film actress and scriptwriter. She is the lead actress in the award-winning TV series, Tinsel.

== Early life and education ==
Obaseki was born on 19 March 1986 in Benin City, Oredo Local Government Area, Edo State. She is the youngest of seven children. Obaseki grew up in Benin City, where she had her primary and secondary school education. She quit studying English at the University of Benin to focus on her acting career.

== Career ==
Obaseki began her acting career in 2007 but is mostly known for her performance in the soap opera Tinsel, where she plays Angela Dede. Before Tinsel, she played the role of the maid in the TV program US, appearing in three episodes. Her first movie was the 2014 film, A Place in the Stars, where she worked alongside Gideon Okeke and Segun Arinze. she was also in the movie Getting Over Him alongside Majid Michel.

== Personal life ==
Obaseki married Arnold Mozia in Benin City on 21 September 2013, after having her first child on 31 August 2012. She gave birth to her second son on 1 January 2015.

== Filmography ==
- Tinsel (2008)
- A Place In The Stars (2014)
- Children of Mud (2017)

== Awards and nominations ==
Year	Award	Category	Result	Ref
2018	Best of Nollywood Awards	Best Actress in a Lead Role - English	Nominated	
