= Olu =

Yoruba name

Olú
- Gender: Unisex
- Language: Yoruba

Origin
- Origin: Nigerian
- Meaning: God, Lord
- Region of origin: South-West Nigeria

Olú is a popular name amongst people of the Yoruba ethnic group. It is usually the first three letters of the full name. Olú is a diminutive of Olúwa in the Yoruba language and it can mean God, deity or lord, so the name 'Olúwale' could mean My God / Lord has come home. Since the name is applied to people, however, god in the sense of deity or lord is what is usually accepted, with the word even being used as a royal or noble title in certain parts of Nigeria, Benin and Togo.

== People with the name Olu ==
- Olubowale Akintimehin (born 1984), American rapper better known as Wale
- Olu Babalola (born 1981), British basketball player
- Olu Dara (born 1941), American jazz musician
- Olu Falae (born 1938), Nigerian politician
- Olu Fashanu (born 2002), American football player
- Olu Oguibe (born 1964), Nigerian-American art historian
- Olu Oyesanya (1923–1999), Nigerian journalist
- Olu Jacobs (born 1942), Nigerian actor
- Olu Maintain (born 1976), Nigerian musician
- Olu Fann (born 1989), member of the American rap duo EarthGang
- Olurotimi Akinosho (born 1988), Nigerian-American actor and singer better known as Rotimi
