= Mariam Kayode =

Nigerian actress (born 2007)

- Born: 1 June 2007 (age 18); Oyo State
- Citizenship: Nigerian
- Occupation: Film actress

Mariam Kayode is a Nigerian actress who came into the limelight with the film Children of Mud. She has featured in movies including The Coffin Salesman, City of Bastards, and Bayi among others.

== Early life and education ==
She was born in Oyo State on 1 June 2007. Mariam was schooled at Kingsfield College, Ijede campus.

== Career ==
The young actress started acting as a child and the films Children of Mud and The Coffin Salesman made her popular.

== Filmography ==
- Dark Light (2015)
- Happiness, Ltd (2016) as Mandu
- Don’t Leave Me (2016)
- Children of Mud (2017) as Emem
- City of Bastards (2019)
- The Coffin Salesman (2019)
- Price of Admission (2020) as Jumi
- Black Dove (2021)
- The Matron (2021) as Shola
- Discerning Eyes (2022) as Lilly
- Checkout (2024) as Tomi
- Bayi

== Awards and nominations ==
Best actress in the short play Children of Mud at AMVCA 2018 awards.

Best child actress for the film The Coffin Salesman for BON award, 2018.

== See also ==
- Children of Mud
- Stan Nze
