= Grange School, Ikeja =

School in Lagos State, Nigeria

Grange School

Location
- 2 Harold Shodipo Crescent; GRA Ikeja; Lagos, Lagos Mainland, Lagos State; Nigeria; 6.588690°N 3.354911°E

Information
- School type: Private, not-for-profit, Selective (interview and assessment)
- Motto: English: A culture of Continuous Improvement (A culture of Continuous Improvement)
- Denomination: Day and Boarding
- Established: 1 November 1958; 67 years ago
- School board: Board of directors
- Authority: Independent Schools Inspectorate (UK)
- Oversight: Standards for British Schools Overseas.
- Headmaster/CEO: Richard Mcmahon
- Chairman of the Board: Dayo Lawuyi (MON)
- Gov. Council Chairperson: Mrs. Awuneba Ajumogobia
- Faculty: 193
- Grades: Key Stages 1-4
- Gender: coeducational
- Enrolment: 682 (September 2015)
- Education system: UK National Curriculum
- Language: English
- Hours in school day: 7:45 a.m. – 3:15 p.m.
- Houses: Benue(Yellow), Donga(Blue), Niger(Green), Ogun(Red)
- Sports: Athletics (Track & Field), Football, Swimming, Basketball, Dance, Martial Arts,
- Affiliation: AISEN (UK), COBIS (UK)
- Website: grangeschool.com

Grange School is a day and boarding school in Ikeja, a city, local government and capital of Lagos State, Nigeria. Grange School was founded in 1958 by a group of British expatriates, to provide education of equivalent standard to that which obtains in the UK. The school's Patron is the Deputy British High Commissioner to Nigeria.

As part of the 40th anniversary in September 1998, the Board felt it was time to add a secondary school for continuity and stability in the education of the pupils.

The Primary Phase prepares pupils for the key stage 2 CheckPoint examinations

The secondary school, therefore, continues into Key Stage 3 culminating in the Checkpoint Exams and Key Stage 4 which culminates in the IGCSE (International General Certificate of Secondary Education). Both exams are under the auspices of the University of Cambridge Local Examination Syndicate (UCLES).

Grange School's population is projected as 430 girls and boys in the Primary Section which is from Reception class to Year 6, between the ages of 4+ and 11. There are 326 pupils in the secondary phase being, Year 7 to Year 11, between the ages of 11 and 16+. The School Policy maintains a class size of 11-19.

== Intellectual activities ==
The school encourages students to participate in charity events as well as other extra-curricular activities such as chess, arts and crafts, swimming, tennis, football, and basketball.

- Anita Orkeh of Grange School, G.R.A Ikeja, came in second in the Scrabble competition.
- Grange Grange School of Lagos, Nigeria made their debut at the U13 WSG in 2020. And had podium first finish on the on all days (athletics, swimming and football) leading to them taking the first position meaning Grange now holds the title of the world champions of U13 sport.
- Grange has competed in The Kids Literature Quiz since its Nigerian inauguration and on 6 February 2020, Grange School Team 1 emerged first.

== Creative and performing arts ==
Grange pupils performed at DIDI Museum's "An Evening with J.P. Clark". They also performed the 'Joseph And His Technicolor Dreamcoat' Musical at the Muson Center.
