= Malta Guinness Street Dance =

Malta Guinness Street Dance is a street dance contest held in Africa with shows having been launched in 2009 in Ghana, and subsequently was hosted in Nigeria, Kenya and Mauritius. In 2016, Mauritius hosted its second Malta Guinness Street Dance qualifications.
