= Dr. Ishola =

Nigerian armed robber

Ishola Oyenusi (died 8 September 1971), popularly known as Dr. Ishola, was a notorious Nigerian armed robber who was active during the 1970s. His modus operandi was carjackings, bank robberies and heists committed during hold-ups. His last robbery took place in 1971 where he and his gang members stole £28,000 at WAHUM factory, Ikeja.

== Trial and execution ==
Oyenusi together with six other members of his gang were executed on 8 September 1971 by a combined police and armed forces firing brigade. His execution was caught on film.

== See also ==
- Lawrence Anini
- Mighty Joe
