= Hard Men =

- Directed by: J. K. Amalou
- Written by: J. K. Amalou
- Produced by: J. K. Amalou; Georges Benayoun; Marina Gefter; Michael Riley
- Starring: Vincent Regan; Lee Ross; Ross Boatman; Frankie Fraser; Ken Campbell; Mirella D'Angelo
- Cinematography: Nick Sawyer
- Edited by: Luc Barnier; Victoria Boydell
- Distributed by: Entertainment Film Distributors
- Release date: October 28, 1996
- Running time: 86 minutes
- Country: United Kingdom
- Language: English

Hard Men is a 1996 British crime gangster black comedy film directed by J. K. Amalou. A forerunner to Lock, Stock and Two Smoking Barrels, it was originally shown at the London Film Festival on 28 October 1996. It was released in cinemas on 28 February 1997.

== Synopsis ==
The plot resolves around three friends Tone (Vincent Regan), Speed (Lee Ross) and Bear (Ross Boatman) working as debt collectors on behalf of notorious crime boss Pops Den (Mad Frankie Fraser). Tone discovers he has a baby daughter and decides to retire from gangster life. Pops Den subsequently orders Bear and Speed to kill Tone and to deliver his hand at 9 am the following day. The story shows the fears that Bear and Speed have, while trying to think of a way to kill Tone by giving him one last big night to remember.

== Reception ==
Hard Men received mixed reviews. Loaded gave the film a positive review and went on to say "In a nutshell, The Krays meets Reservoir Dogs." On the other hand Variety wrote a negative review, as they felt that the "Film has a consistently interesting look on an obviously meagre budget, with atmospheric use of grungy London locations and much use of close-ups in dialogue sequences. The latter, unfortunately, only serve to emphasize the script’s weaknesses."
