= Sejiro Avoseh =

African contemporary artist

- Born: Badagry, Lagos
- Education: Lagos State Polytechnic; University for the Creative Arts, Canterbury (MFA)
- Known for: Contemporary arts
- Style: Painting, Collaging, Mixed media

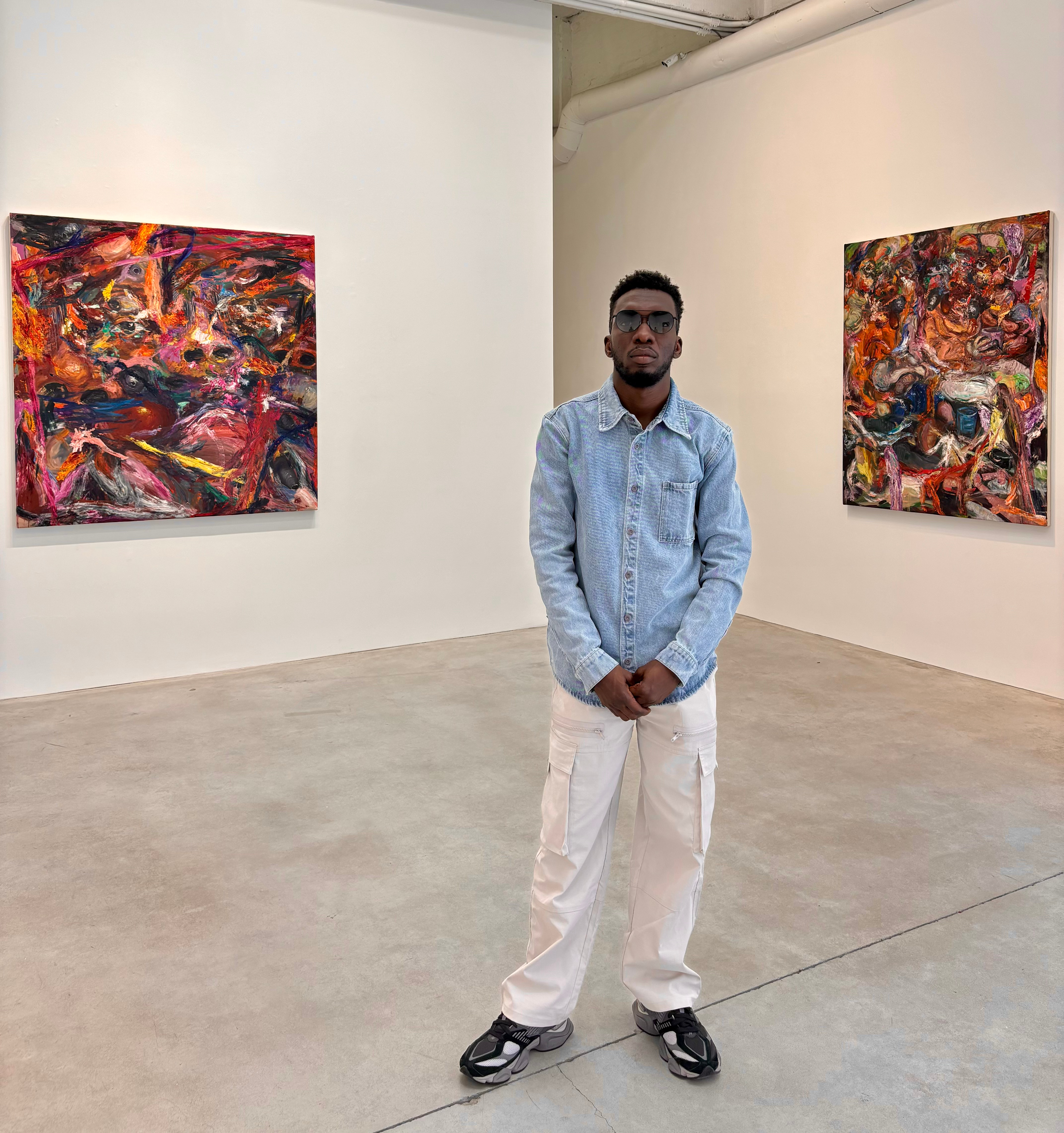
Avoseh posing with two of his works at his "Faces of Nowhere" solo exhibition at Kravets Wehby Gallery, New York in June 2024.

Sejiro Avoseh (born 1990 in Lagos) is a contemporary artist based in the United Kingdom. His work, primarily in painting and collage, explores themes of migration, identity, and self-invention. Drawing on his experiences of leaving Nigeria to settle in the UK, Avoseh creates layered, fragmented compositions that reflect memory, dislocation, and the search for belonging. His work has been exhibited internationally, including at Kravets Wehby Gallery (New York), Afikaris Gallery (Paris), and Jupiter Contemporary (Miami). His works are deeply autobiographical, lending critical voices on the poor fate of the indigent underclass in his society, and on the highhandedness and abuse of power by public servants and elected officials.

Avoseh was commissioned to design the cover for the December 2020 edition of The Native magazine, which celebrated Wizkid’s Made in Lagos album. His work has since been featured and profiled across numerous international and local publications, including Le Monde, Financial Times, Google Arts & Culture, Daily Trust, WhiteWalls, The Blotted, The Sole Adventurer, Flux Review, and Whitehot Magazine. Avoseh's work has been part of notable collections that include pieces by Jean-Michel Basquiat, Pablo Picasso, KAWS, and others underscoring his growing relevance within the global contemporary art landscape.

== Education ==
Avoseh holds a Higher National Diploma in Creative Arts from Lagos State Polytechnic in Lagos, Nigeria, and a Masters in Fine Art at the University for the Creative Arts, Canterbury, Kent, England.

== Solo exhibitions ==
- "A Chorus of Reminiscence". Jupiter Contemporary Gallery, Miami, USA. October – November 2024.
- "Faces of Nowhere". Kravets Wehby Gallery, New York, USA. June 2024.
- "Alien In Spaces". Kravets Wehby Gallery, New York, USA. May 2023.
- "Abuse of Innocence". Angels and Muse, Lagos, Nigeria. September 2020.
- "When We Are Not What We Are". RELE Art Gallery, Lagos, Nigeria. July 2018.

== Group exhibitions, art fairs, auctions and workshops ==
- "Résiste" (with Salifou Lindou). Afikaris Gallery, Paris, France. February 2021.
- Young Contemporaries Alumni Exhibition. National Museum, Lagos. January 2020.
- "Back to Base - Young Contemporaries Art Workshop for Students" in Badagry. Goethe Institut, Lagos, Nigeria. 2019.
- Young Contemporaries Exhibition. RELE Art Foundation, Lagos, Nigeria. January 2017.
