= First Consultant Hospital =

Private hospital in Lagos, Nigeria

Geography
- Location: St. Gregory's College Road, Lagos Island, Lagos, Lagos State, Nigeria
- Coordinates: 6.44797°N 3.41012°E

Organisation
- Care system: Private

Services
- Emergency department: Yes

Links
- Website: www.fcmcng.com
- Lists: Hospitals in Nigeria
- Other links: List of hospitals in Lagos

First Consultant Hospital (also known as First Consultant Medical Centre) is a private hospital in Lagos. It is located on St. Gregory's College Road in Obalende, a neighborhood of Lagos Island, in Lagos.

The hospital came to worldwide attention in 2014 as the hospital where the Ebola virus disease patient Patrick Sawyer was taken after becoming ill on arrival in Lagos. Sawyer later died at the hospital on 24 July.

On 19 August, it was reported that the doctor who treated Sawyer at the hospital, Ameyo Adadevoh, had also died of Ebola disease. Adadevoh was posthumously praised for preventing Sawyer from leaving the hospital at the time of diagnosis, thereby playing a key role in curbing the spread of the virus in Nigeria.
