= J. K. Amalou =

Film director

- Born: France
- Occupation(s): Film director, screenwriter, producer

J. K. Amalou is a French screenwriter, producer and director, known for his 2012 movie Deviation.

== Filmography ==
Year	Film	Director	Producer	Writer	Notes
1995	Belle Époque	No	Yes	No	French miniseries
1996	Hard Men	Yes	Yes	Yes	
2007	The Man Who Would Be Queen	Yes	Yes	Yes	
2012	Deviation	Yes	Yes	Yes	
2014	A Place in the Stars	No	No	Yes	co-written with Ita Hozaife
2015	Assassin	Yes	Yes	Yes	co-produced with Jonathan Sothcott
