= Tijani Luqman Opeyemi =

Nigerian footballer

Tijani Luqman Opeyemi (born 8 July 1990 in Lagos) is a Nigerian professional soccer player at central defender and right back. He has played in the Nigerian Premier League and Turkish leagues. Through 2016, Opeyemi has played 180 matches, scoring 19 goals.
