= Kayode Otitoju =

Nigerian politician

Commissioner for Information, Culture, Sports and Social Development, Ekiti State
- In office 2004–2005
- Governor: Ayo Fayose

Personal details
- Born: May 1955 (age 71)
- Party: People's Democratic Party
- Education: B.A. in Geography
- Occupation: Technocrat, politician
- Known for: Former Ekiti State Commissioner

Kayode Otitoju (born May 1955) is a Nigerian technocrat, politician and former commissioner for Information, Culture, Sports, and Social Development in Ekiti State, southwestern Nigeria.

== Education and career ==
Otitoju obtained a bachelor's degree in Geography from the University of Ibadan in 1980 and later became a fellow of the Chartered Institute of Logistics and Transport. He worked at the Nigerian Ports Authority for 10 years, between 1981 and 1991 and rose to the position of a Senior Traffic Officer and in 2004, he was appointed as Ekiti State Commissioner for Information, Culture, Sports, and Social Development. He served in that capacity for 1 year, between 2004 and 2005.

He contested the seat of a senator representing Ekiti North twice, in 2003 and 2011 but lost the election and in 2004, he was appointed as the Commissioner for Information, Culture, Sports, and Social Development. He served on the board of the Securities and Exchange Commission (SEC) in Nigeria from 2005 to 2007. In 2009, he was one of 24 experts in the National Technical Working Group on Transport for Vision 2020 and in 2013, he was a member of the Technical Working Group of the National Integrated Infrastructure Master Plan (NIIMP). In 2014, he was appointed as the chairman, Transportation Committee of the Lekki Peninsula Scheme, Lagos. In 2018, he was elected Lekki Estate Residents' Association (LERA) Chairman.
