= Femi Robinson =

Nigerian actor (1940–2015)

Frederick Olufemi Robinson
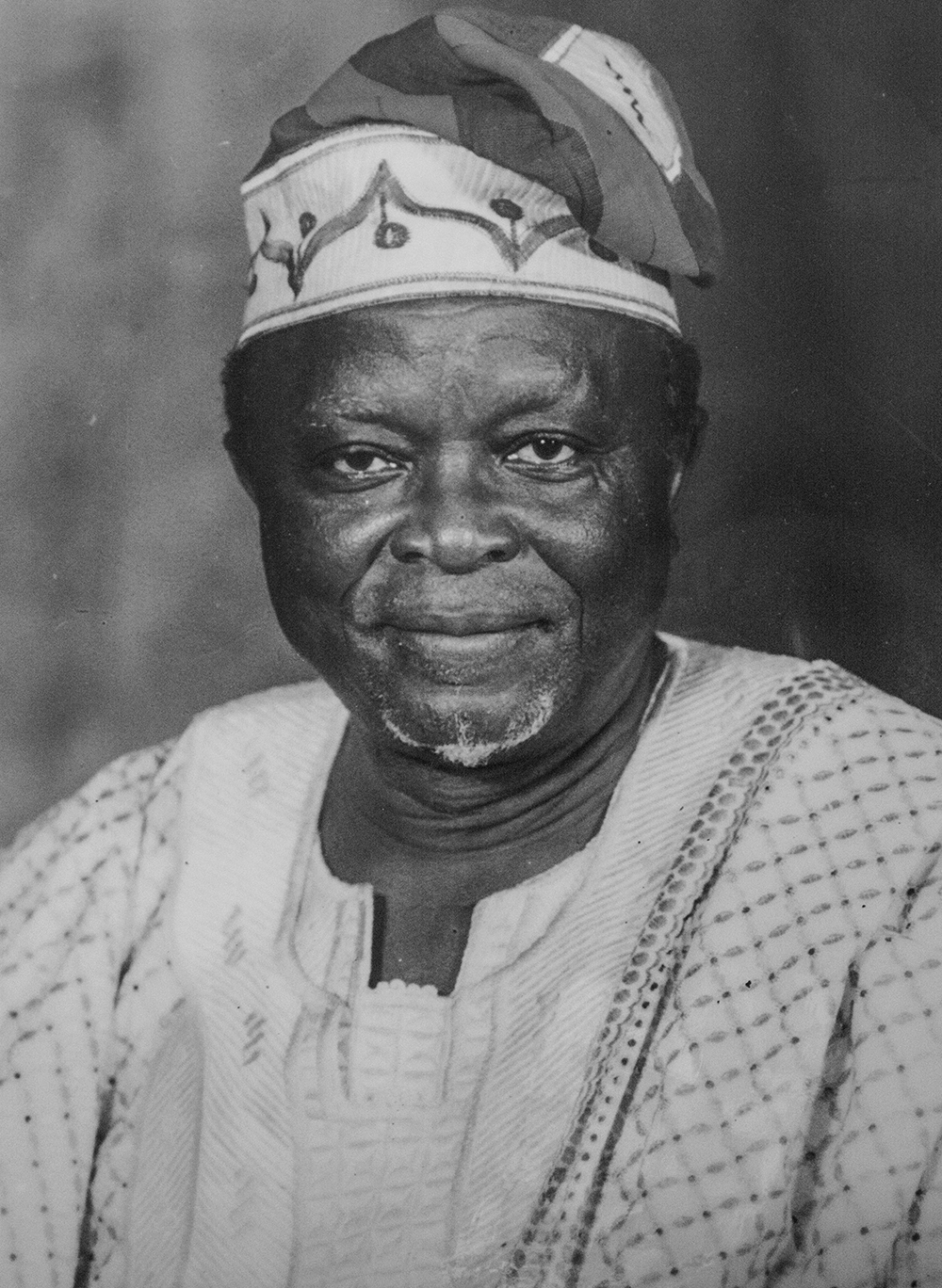
- Born: September 27, 1940; Abeokuta, Ogun State, Nigeria
- Died: May 20, 2015 (aged 74); Lagos, Nigeria
- Other name: Frederick
- Occupation: Actor
- Years active: 1968–1988
- Notable work: The Gods Are Not to Blame (1968); The Village Headmaster
- Spouse: Juliana Modupe Robinson
- Children: 3

Femi Robinson (September 27, 1940 – May 20, 2015) was a Nigerian film and television actor, famous for his lead role in The Village Headmaster, where his stage name, "Ife Araba, The Village Headmaster", was coined. Chief Eddie Ugbomah, former Chairman of the Nigerian Film Corporation, called him "an icon of the industry".

== Early life ==
Robinson was born on September 27, 1940, at Bodo, a village in Abeokuta, the capital of Ogun State, southwestern Nigeria, into the family of an Ifá priest. He obtained a bachelor's degree in botany from University of Nigeria, Nsukka (1962-1966) in the early 1960s before joining the Nigerian film industry.

== Career ==
He began his acting career playing the lead role of Odewale in The Gods Are Not to Blame, a 1968 play by the Nigerian playwright Chief Ola Rotimi. The play was an adaptation of the Greek classic Oedipus Rex. He also played the lead role in The Village Headmaster, Nigeria's longest-running television soap opera from 1968 to 1988, scripted by Olusegun Olusola.

On October 11, 2012, Robinson called on the Federal Government of Nigeria to ban Chinua Achebe's novel Things Fall Apart in Nigerian schools, following the publication of Achebe's controversial memoir There Was a Country: A Personal History of Biafra.

== Death ==
Robinson died of a heart attack on May 20, 2015, at Ayodele Hospital in the Ifako Ijaiye local government area of Lagos. Robinson's death drew the attentions of many notable Nigerians. According to Vanguard, a veteran Nigerian film actor, Prince Jide Kosoko, said in his tribute, "Femi Robinson was a true professional. He has contributed immensely to the growth of the entertainment industry in Nigeria".

The President of the Federal Republic of Nigeria, Goodluck Ebele Jonathan, conveyed his condolences to Robinson's family in a statement by his Special Adviser on Media and Publicity, Dr. Reuben Abati.
