= Elizabeth I (2005 TV series) =

2005 two-part British historical drama television miniseries

- Title screen with Helen Mirren and Jeremy Irons
- Written by: Nigel Williams
- Directed by: Tom Hooper
- Starring: Helen Mirren; Jeremy Irons; Patrick Malahide; Toby Jones; Hugh Dancy; Barbara Flynn; Ewen Bremner; Ian McDiarmid
- Theme music composer: Rob Lane
- Countries of origin: United Kingdom; United States
- Original language: English
- No. of series: 1
- No. of episodes: 2

Production
- Executive producers: Charles Pattinson; George Faber; Nigel Williams; Suzan Harrison
- Producer: Barney Reisz
- Cinematography: Larry Smith
- Editors: Beverley Mills; Melanie Oliver
- Running time: 223 minutes
- Production companies: HBO Films; Channel 4 Television Corporation; Company Pictures
- Budget: £5.5 million

Original release
- Network: Channel 4
- Release: 29 September – 6 October 2005

Elizabeth I is a two-part 2005 British-American historical drama television serial directed by Tom Hooper, written by Nigel Williams, and starring Helen Mirren as Elizabeth I of England. The drama covers approximately the last 24 years of her nearly 45-year reign. Part 1 focuses on the final years of her relationship with the Earl of Leicester, played by Jeremy Irons. Part 2 focuses on her subsequent relationship with the Earl of Essex, played by Hugh Dancy.

The series originally was broadcast in the United Kingdom in two two-hour segments on Channel 4. It later aired on HBO in the United States, CBC and TMN in Canada, ATV in Hong Kong, ABC in Australia, and TVNZ Television One in New Zealand.

The series went on to win Emmy, Peabody, and Golden Globe Awards.

== Plot ==
=== Part 1 ===
In 1579, Elizabeth I refuses to marry. Chief advisor Lord Burghley and spymaster Francis Walsingham plan to have her wed the Duke of Anjou, which would cement an English-French alliance against Spain. Meanwhile, Elizabeth's favorite, the Earl of Leicester, opposes the match due to his affection for her.

Upon arriving in England, the Duke meets and courts Elizabeth, gaining her favour. She angrily banishes Leicester from court when she learns he is married and decides not to marry the Duke due to negative popular opinion towards the match.

Seven years later, Elizabeth welcomes Leicester back. Walsingham gathers evidence to prove that Elizabeth's Catholic cousin Mary, Queen of Scots, is plotting to have her killed. Elizabeth is reluctant to have Mary executed because of the war it might ignite between England and Spain. During a secret meeting at her prison, Mary gives Elizabeth her word that she does not want her dead.

Elizabeth hesitantly gives Leicester command of the English campaign to assist the Dutch against Spain, which fails and gives Spain control of Holland. Once it is proven Mary has, in fact, been conspiring against Elizabeth's life, Mary is judged guilty of treason and executed.

After negotiations between England and Spain fail, a fleet of Spanish ships are sent for England. Elizabeth gives Leicester command of the land forces and rides with him and his stepson, the Earl of Essex, to Tilbury, where they expect the Spanish to attempt a landing and where Elizabeth delivers a speech to the troops.

The Spanish Armada is ultimately defeated, but Leicester falls gravely ill as they learn of the English victory. On his deathbed, Leicester bids Essex to take care of Elizabeth.

=== Part 2 ===
By 1589, Elizabeth has fallen in love with Essex, who is now her favourite. When Essex takes part in a military expedition to Lisbon against her wishes, she is openly outraged but forgives him in spite of his failure to take the city from the Spanish. She grants him ten percent of a tax on sweet wines and a seat on the Privy Council of which Lord Burghley's son Robert was also recently made a member.

Essex and Cecil develop a rivalry, as illustrated by the affair of Elizabeth's physician Dr. Lopez, who is hanged based on evidence brought forth by Essex of his participation in a Spanish plot against Elizabeth, evidence proved questionable after the fact by Cecil.

Essex's political ambitions clash with his devotion and loyalty to Elizabeth. As Elizabeth finds her young lover's behavior becoming increasingly problematic, she draws closer to Cecil, who is named Secretary of State following Walsingham's death. Essex is publicly hailed upon his return to England after taking Cadiz from the Spanish, but his relationship with Elizabeth begins to deteriorate.

She and Cecil suspect Essex of secretly communicating with James VI of Scotland, son of Mary, Queen of Scots and a potential successor to the English throne. After Burghley's death, Elizabeth sends Essex to Ireland to put down a rebellion, but he instead makes a truce and returns to England alone. Elizabeth puts Essex under house arrest.

Essex and his followers fail to start a rebellion in London and are captured. At his trial, after accusing Cecil of collaborating with Spain but failing to offer proof, Essex is found guilty of treason and beheaded. Sometime later, Elizabeth becomes listless, going for three weeks without eating before making her way to her bed and requesting a priest, saying she is minded to die as she closes her eyes for the last time.

== Cast ==
8 actors receive billing in the opening credits of 1 or both parts:

- Helen Mirren as Elizabeth I
- Jeremy Irons as Earl of Leicester
- Hugh Dancy as Earl of Essex
- Toby Jones as Robert Cecil
- Patrick Malahide as Sir Francis Walsingham
- Ian McDiarmid as Lord Burghley
- Barbara Flynn as Mary, Queen of Scots
- Ewen Bremner as James VI and I

The full cast of each part is listed in the closing credits of each part. Apart from those receiving star billing, those in Part 1 are:

- Jérémie Covillault as Duke of Anjou
- Simon Woods as Gifford
- Diana Kent as Lady Essex
- Toby Salaman as Dr Lopez
- Geoffrey Streatfeild as Sir Anthony Babington
- David Delve as Sir Francis Drake
- Martin Marquez as Don Bernardino de Mendoza
- Rimantas Bagdzevičius as Howard of Effingham

Apart from those receiving star billing and Salaman as Dr Lopez, those in Part 2 are:

- Will Keen as Francis Bacon
- Eddie Redmayne as Southampton
- Ben Pullen as Sir Walter Raleigh
- Charlotte Asprey as Frances Walsingham

== Production ==
According to director Tom Hooper, Mirren "came onboard before the script was written because the feeling was that it was only worth doing if she would play it." Hooper and Mirren had previously worked together on Prime Suspect 6. The project was originally going to be 2 hours and focus on her relationship with the Earl of Essex, but Mirren "felt that there should be more politics" according to writer Nigel Williams. The series was filmed in Vilnius, Lithuania, where massive sets were constructed inside a sports arena that was abandoned in the 1970s. Palace of Whitehall set was constructed to scale from original plans.

== Reception ==
=== Critical response ===
At Metacritic, which assigns a weighted average score out of 100 to reviews from mainstream critics, Elizabeth I received an average score of 81% based on 21 reviews.

David Wiegand of the San Francisco Chronicle wrote that Mirren's performance "is powerful enough to shatter your television screen, not to mention any notion you might have had that if you've seen one Elizabeth—Bette Davis, Glenda Jackson or Cate Blanchett, for example—you've seen them all." He added that Irons, who he felt "has sometimes settled into craggy self-parody in lesser films [...] invests Leicester with as much depth and complexity as he can, and he is every bit Mirren's equal onscreen."

Brian Lowry of Variety felt that the second part was better than the first, praised Mirren's performance and wrote that "[director] Tom Hooper, who previously directed Mirren in Prime Suspect 6, indulges [writer Nigel] Williams' penchant for long, theatrical monologues, which require a little getting used to in the slow early going. Gradually, however, as with the best British costume drama, the narrative becomes absorbing."

Alessandra Stanley of The New York Times wrote that Mirren is "one of the few actresses working today who can actually convincingly play a historical figure in her 40s" and that Elizabeth I was more historically accurate than Elizabeth (1998), though she felt that "[the miniseries'] interpretation, like so many others, wallows in the painful self-pity of a powerful, aging woman who craves true love". While the miniseries is visually "no match for the 1998 movie" to Stanley, she concludes that Elizabeth I offers "a richly drawn portrait of a powerful woman who is both ruthless and sentimental, formidable and mercurial, vain and likable."

== Accolades ==
Year	Award	Category	Nominee(s)	Result	Ref.
2006	British Academy Television Craft Awards	Best Costume Design	Mike O'Neill	Nominated	
2006	British Academy Television Craft Awards	Best Make-Up and Hair Design	Fae Hammond	Nominated	
2006	British Academy Television Craft Awards	Best Original Television Music	Rob Lane	Won	
2006	British Academy Television Craft Awards	Best Production Design	Eve Stewart	Nominated	
2006	Broadcast Awards	Best Drama Series or Serial		Nominated	
2006	Broadcasting Press Guild Awards	Best Actress	Helen Mirren	Nominated	
2006	Golden Nymph Awards	Outstanding Actress – Mini Series	Helen Mirren	Won	
2006	Online Film & Television Association Awards	Best Miniseries		Nominated	
2006	Online Film & Television Association Awards	Best Actress in a Motion Picture or Miniseries	Helen Mirren	Nominated	
2006	Online Film & Television Association Awards	Best Supporting Actor in a Motion Picture or Miniseries	Hugh Dancy	Nominated	
2006	Online Film & Television Association Awards	Best Supporting Actor in a Motion Picture or Miniseries	Jeremy Irons	Won	
2006	Online Film & Television Association Awards	Best Supporting Actress in a Motion Picture or Miniseries	Barbara Flynn	Nominated	
2006	Online Film & Television Association Awards	Best Direction of a Motion Picture or Miniseries		Nominated	
2006	Online Film & Television Association Awards	Best Writing of a Motion Picture or Miniseries		Won	
2006	Online Film & Television Association Awards	Best Ensemble in a Motion Picture or Miniseries		Nominated	
2006	Peabody Awards		Company Pictures and Channel 4 in association with HBO Films	Won	
2006	Primetime Emmy Awards	Outstanding Miniseries	George Faber, Suzan Harrison, Charles Pattinson, Barney Reisz, and Nigel Williams	Won	
2006	Primetime Emmy Awards	Outstanding Lead Actress in a Miniseries or a Movie	Helen Mirren	Won	
2006	Primetime Emmy Awards	Outstanding Supporting Actor in a Miniseries or a Movie	Hugh Dancy	Nominated	
2006	Primetime Emmy Awards	Outstanding Supporting Actor in a Miniseries or a Movie	Jeremy Irons	Won	
2006	Primetime Emmy Awards	Outstanding Directing for a Miniseries, Movie or a Dramatic Special	Tom Hooper	Won	
2006	Primetime Emmy Awards	Outstanding Writing for a Miniseries, Movie or a Dramatic Special	Nigel Williams	Nominated	
2006	Primetime Emmy Awards	Outstanding Art Direction for a Miniseries or Movie	Leon McCarthy, Eve Stewart, and Sarah Whittle	Won	
2006	Primetime Emmy Awards	Outstanding Casting for a Miniseries, Movie or a Special	Doreen Jones	Won	
2006	Primetime Emmy Awards	Outstanding Costumes for a Miniseries, Movie or a Special	Samantha Horn and Mike O'Neill (for "Part 2")	Won	
2006	Primetime Emmy Awards	Outstanding Hairstyling for a Miniseries, Movie or a Special	Fae Hammond and Su Westwood (for "Part 2")	Won	
2006	Primetime Emmy Awards	Outstanding Single-Camera Picture Editing for a Miniseries or a Movie	Beverley Mills (for "Part 1")	Won	
2006	Primetime Emmy Awards	Outstanding Single-Camera Picture Editing for a Miniseries or a Movie	Melanie Oliver (for "Part 2")	Nominated	
2006	Primetime Emmy Awards	Outstanding Single-Camera Sound Mixing for a Miniseries or a Movie	Ken Campbell and Paul Hamblin (for "Part 1")	Nominated	
2006	Royal Television Society Awards	Drama Serial		Nominated	
2006	Satellite Awards	Best Miniseries		Nominated	
2006	Satellite Awards	Best Actor in a Miniseries or Motion Picture Made for Television	Hugh Dancy	Nominated	
2006	Satellite Awards	Best Actress in a Miniseries or Motion Picture Made for Television	Helen Mirren	Nominated	
2006	Television Critics Association Awards	Outstanding Achievement in Movies, Miniseries and Specials		Nominated	
2006	Women's Image Network Awards	Outstanding Lead Actress in a Miniseries or a Movie	Helen Mirren	Won	
2007	American Cinema Editors Awards	Best Edited Miniseries or Motion Picture for Non-Commercial Television	Beverley Mills (for "Part 1")	Nominated	
2007	American Film Institute Awards	Top 10 Television Programs		Won	
2007	Costume Designers Guild Awards	Outstanding Made for Television Movie or Miniseries	Mike O'Neill	Won	
2007	Critics' Choice Awards	Best Picture Made for Television		Won	
2007	Golden Globe Awards	Best Miniseries or Television Film		Won	
2007	Golden Globe Awards	Best Actress in a Miniseries or Motion Picture Made for Television	Helen Mirren	Won	
2007	Golden Globe Awards	Best Supporting Actor in a Series, Miniseries or Motion Picture Made for Television	Jeremy Irons	Won	
2007	Producers Guild of America Awards	David L. Wolper Award for Outstanding Producer of Long-Form Television	Suzan Harrison, George Faber, Charles Pattinson, and Barney Reisz	Won	
2007	Screen Actors Guild Awards	Outstanding Performance by a Male Actor in a Miniseries or Television Movie	Jeremy Irons	Won	
2007	Screen Actors Guild Awards	Outstanding Performance by a Female Actor in a Miniseries or Television Movie	Helen Mirren	Won	
2007	Visual Effects Society Awards	Outstanding Created Environment in a Live Action Broadcast Program, Commercial or Music Video	David A.T. Bowman, Jimmy Kiddell, Russell Horth, and Gurel Mehmet (for "Part 1")	Won	

== See also ==
- List of Primetime Emmy Awards received by HBO
