= Kayode Bankole =

Nigerian footballer

Bankole Kayode
Personal information
- Full name: Bankole Kayode Iyanu
- Date of birth: 16 October 2002 (age 24)
- Place of birth: Ipokia, Nigeria
- Height: 1.85 m (6 ft 1 in)
- Position: Goalkeeper

Team information
- Current team: TS Galaxy
- Number: 35

Senior career*
Years	Team	Apps	(Gls)
2019–2020	Shooting Stars	0	(0)
2020–2025	Remo Stars	89	(0)
2025–	TS Galaxy	0	(0)

International career^{‡}
2022	Nigeria	1	(0)
- * Club domestic league appearances and goals as of 17 July 2022 ‡ National team caps and goals as of 9 November 2022

Bankole Kayode Iyanu is a Nigerian footballer who plays as a goalkeeper for Nigeria National Team, and South African Premier Soccer League team TS Galaxy

He began his senior career with Remo Stars in 2020..

== Career statistics ==
=== International ===
As of 9 November 2022

Appearances and goals by national team and year
National team	Year	Apps	Goals
Nigeria	2022	1	0
Total		1	0
