= Oluwapelumi Arameedey Kayode =

Nigerian actress and movie producer

Oluwapelumi Arameedey Kayode (OAK)
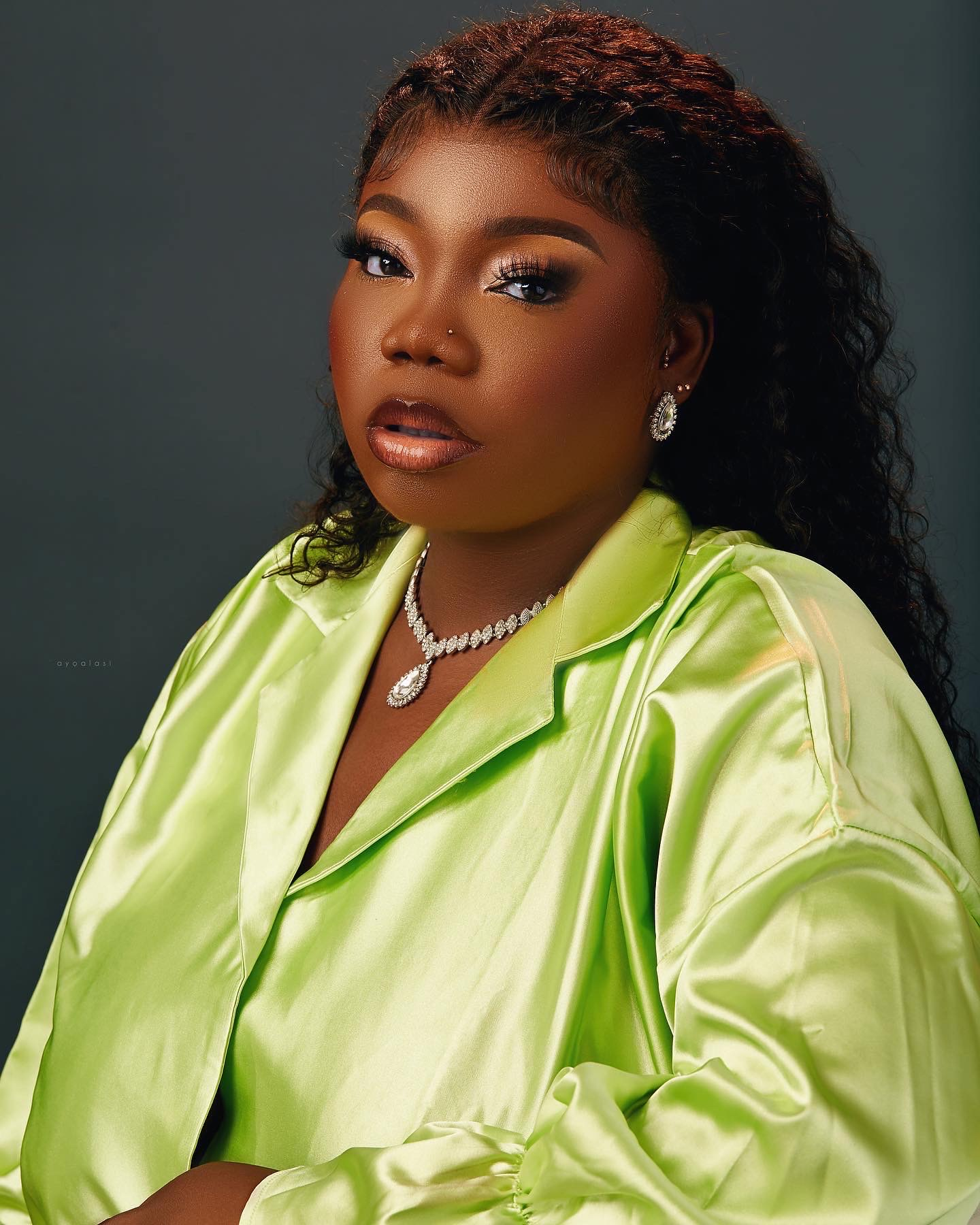
- Education: Olabisi Onabanjo University
- Known for: Oba Opoor

Oluwapelumi Arameedey Kayode is a Nigerian actress and a movie producer who is known for the production of Oba Opoor and Okete. The movies were premiered on YouTube and YorubaplusTV.

== Early life and education ==
Arameedey grew up in Lagos where she obtained her primary and secondary school certificate at Goshen Nursery and Primary School and Evans Adelaja in Bariga respectively. She obtained her National Diploma from Nigeria Institute of Journalism, Ogba, Lagos and bagged her first degree in the field of Mass Communication at the Olabisi Onabanjo University, Ago-Iwoye in Ogun State.

== Career ==
Arameedey started her career as a protege of a movie director and producer, Mr Okikiola Afolayan at the Eagles Caucasus for two years before venturing into acting.

== Filmography ==
Arameedey has featured in different movie projects. These include;

- Okete
- Warisi Omo Baba Landlord 1&2,
- Naija Christmas
- Eniyara
- Olosho ghetto,
- Omo Baba Olowo
- Obo,
- Sunamiii,
- Ile Alayo the series,
- Omo Yahoo,
- Oosha Aje,
- Rotten potatoes,
