= Oluwashina Okeleji =

Nigerian sports journalist

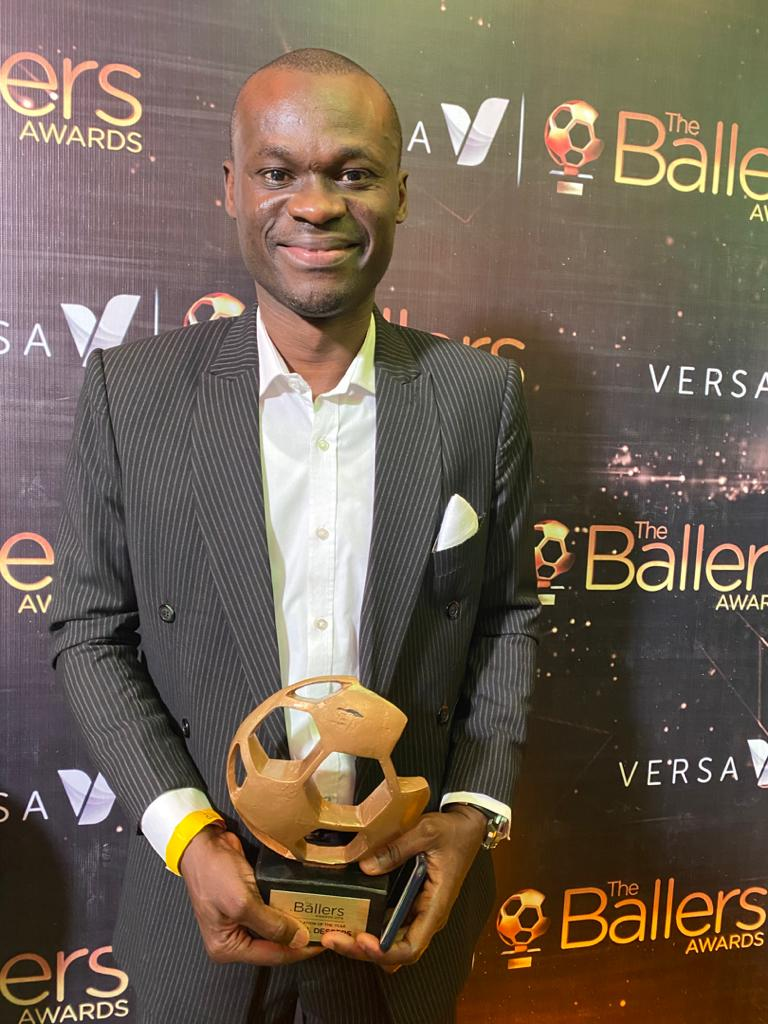
- Oluwashina at 2019 Ballers Awards in Lagos
- Born: July 01; Lagos, Nigeria
- Occupations: Sports journalist, broadcaster
- Website: https://www.linkedin.com/in/oluwashina-okeleji-b5b75b4a/

Oluwashina Okeleji (born 1 July) is a Nigerian sports journalist who works for BBC Sport. He reports for the BBC World Service Radio, TV and writes regularly for the BBC African football website about the continent's football and stars around the world. He's in regular contact with many top African players and often travels to Europe to meet them. While football is his main strength he also keeps abreast of a wide variety of sports.

== Early life ==
He was born in Lagos' tough teeming Ajegunle ghetto on 1 July 1978, to an Islamic scholar father and a mum who is a trader. He is the first of three children with a brother Mustapha as well as a younger sister Raliat. He went through with his primary and secondary education in Lagos. But moved to Ibadan for his higher education. He proceeded to the BBC Bush House in London for his Broadcast Journalism training in November 2006.

== Broadcasting ==
Oluwashina started writing for Multi-Sports News and Pictures (a sports publication in 1999) before getting his breakthrough on Television with Kayode Tijani on Sports Focus in 2000. Same year he joined another young journalist Adewole Opatola on the Sports segment of Funmi Iyanda's popular breakfast talk show 'New Dawn with Funmi'. In 2003 he left Television to become the editor of the country's first all-sport website NigerianSports.com, from where he was snapped up by the BBC in March 2004 immediately after the Africa Cup of Nations in Tunisia.

Since March 2004, Oluwashina has been reporting for the BBC World Service Radio and Television (Focus on Africa Sport). Writes regularly for the BBC African Football website. He also contributes to World Soccer Magazine and Al Jazeera English (Sport) online and TV.

He is a regular pundit for Kwesé Sports TV. He travels to South Africa regularly for the English Premier League and Football Fundi's on Kwesé Sports.

Oluwashina is also a Guardian Nigeria Sports columnist.

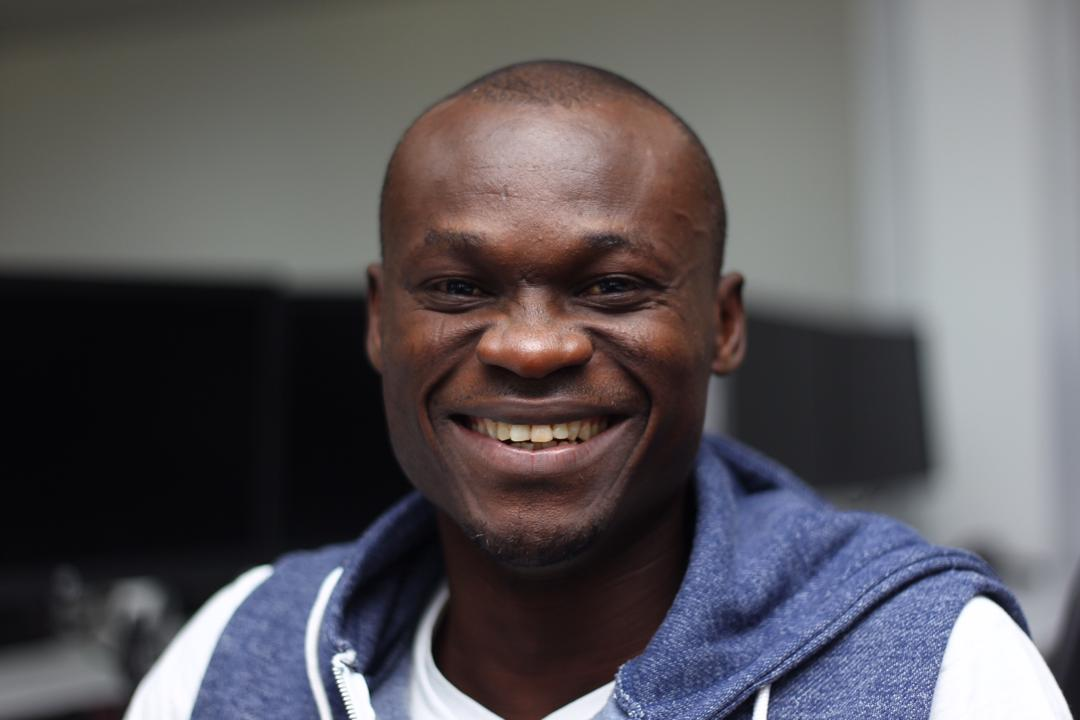
Okeleji at home in Lagos

== Awards and honours ==
- AIPS SPORT MEDIA AWARDS 2018 - Best Audio (AFRICA) - 2nd runners-up
- AIPS SPORT MEDIA AWARDS 2018: Writing - Best Colour Piece (AFRICA) - Winner
- Nigerian Sports Award 2018: Journalist of the year (Print) - Finalist

== Events covered ==
- 1999 FIFA World Youth Championship
- 2003 All-Africa Games
- 2004 African Cup of Nations
- 2005 FIBA Africa Championship for Women
- 2006 Africa Cup of Nations
- 2008 Africa Cup of Nations
- 2009 FIFA U-20 World Cup
- 2010 FIFA World Cup
- 2011 Homeless World Cup
- 2014 FIFA World Cup
- 2006 FIFA World Cup
- 2013 Africa Cup of Nations
- 2019 Africa Cup of Nations
