= Justus Esiri =

Nigerian actor (1942–2013)

Chief Justus Esiri OON
- Born: 20 November 1942; Abraka, Delta State, Nigeria
- Died: 19 February 2013 (aged 70); Lagos, Nigeria
- Citizenship: Nigerian
- Occupation: Actor
- Years active: 1968–2013
- Notable work: Wasted Years
- Children: Dr. Sid
- Awards: Best Actor award at the 9th Africa Movie Academy Awards

Justus Esiri (20 November 1942 – 19 February 2013) was a Nigerian actor, widely regarded as one of the pioneers of Nollywood, with a career spanning several decades from the 1960s. He gained prominence for his role in the Nigerian Television Authority television series The Village Headmaster and in the film adaptation of Chinua Achebe's book Things Fall Apart, where he played Obierika. He posthumously won the Best Actor award at the 9th Africa Movie Academy Awards for his role in Assassins Practice and was also honoured as the inaugural recipient of the Goodluck Jonathan Lifetime Achievement Award at the 2013 Nollywood Movies Awards. The Nigerian government conferred on him national honours, including Officer of the Order of the Niger (OON) in recognition of his contributions to the Nigerian film industry. He was the father of Mavin Records musician Dr Sid.

== Early life and career ==
Esiri was born in Oria-Abraka, in present-day Delta State, on 20 November 1942. He attended Urhobo College, Effurun, in the then Bendel State. He travelled to Germany for his higher education, attending LMU Munich (1964), Prof. Weners Institute of Engineering, West Berlin (1967) and the Ahrens School of Performing Arts (1968). While in Europe, he began his acting career and worked as a German translator for the Voice of Nigeria. He later received an invitation from the Nigerian government to star in The Village Headmaster.

== Death and legacy ==
Esiri died in a hospital in Lagos on 19 February 2013 from complications of diabetes. A tribute night, organised by the Actors Guild of Nigeria, was held at the National Stadium on 8 April 2013. A funeral mass was held at St. Jude Catholic Church in Mafoluku, Lagos, on 9 April 2013, followed by a service of songs in Warri. He was buried in his hometown of Abraka. Several government officials and entertainment personalities were present at his funeral.

== Filmography ==
He has appeared in several Nollywood and television productions, including:

- No limit
- Wasted Years (2000)
- Forever (1997)
- The Prize (1999) as Mr. Peters
- Rising Moon (2005) as Obasi
- Six Demons (2005) as Chief Marshall Adelabu
- Corridors of Power (2005) as Otunba Damijo
- The Last Knight (2005)
- The Tyrant (2005)
- The Investigation
- The Ghost (2005) as Anderson
- Sitanda (2006)
- The Assassin's Practice (2013) as Eviano
- Doctor Bello (2013)
- Twin Sword (2012)
- Keep my Will (2007) as Dike
- Invasion 1897
