= Gideon Okeke =

Nigerian actor

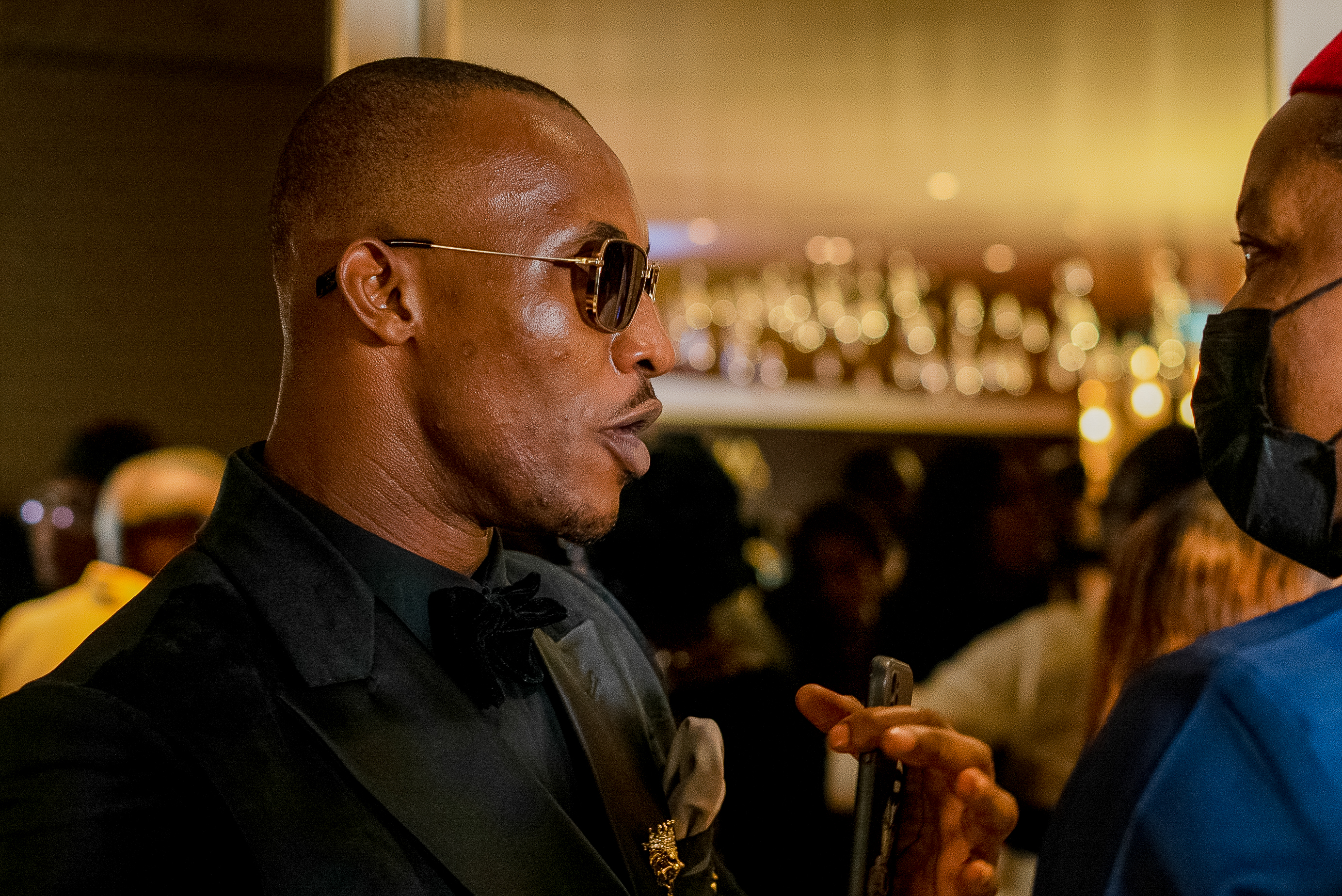
- Gideon Okeke at the 2021 AMA Awards
- Education: Biochemistry, Nnamdi Azikiwe University
- Alma mater: Nnamdi Azikiwe University
- Occupations: Actor, Model, and TV Presenter.
- Years active: 2006–present
- Notable work: Relentless
- Television: Big Brother Nigeria; Tinsel
- Children: 1

Gideon Okeke is a Nigerian actor, model, and TV Presenter. He came to the public eye in 2006 when he appeared as a contestant on the first edition of Big Brother Nigeria. In 2008, Gideon joined the cast of the M-NET TV series Tinsel on which he is a regular to date.

== Early life and education ==
An only child, Gideon grew up in Ajegunle, one of the slums of Lagos, a place he speaks so fondly of. He attended Nnamdi Azikiwe University where he studied applied bio-chemistry. He later enrolled at the Lee Strasberg Institute in New York where he obtained professional training in acting.

== Career ==
=== Television work ===
After appearing in the first edition of Big Brother Nigeria, Gideon joined the cast of M-NET daytime series Tinsel, as Phillip Ade Williams, the arrogant son of a media mogul. He remains one of the longest-serving actors on the show. Gideon has also appeared on the South African TV series Jacobs cross. In 2014, he played the role of Bernard in the irokotv series Poisoned Bait, directed by BAFTA LA award-winning director Leila Djansi. In addition, Gideon was the host of the DSTV game show Money Drop.

=== Film ===
Gideon landed his first lead role in the Nigerian drama film Relentless in 2010, starring alongside Jimmy Jean-Louis and Nneka Egbuna. His second lead role was in the 2014 crime thriller A Place in the Stars. In the same year, he played the role of Tobena, the love interest of the lead character in the romantic comedy When Love Happens. Other films to his credit include the caper crime comedy Gbomo Gbomo Express and the Ghanaian romantic drama Anniversary. In 2016 he was cast in the drama thriller 93 Days. Starring alongside Danny Glover, Gideon received an AMVCA nomination for his portrayal of Dr. Morris Ibeawuchi, one of the surviving doctors of the Nigerian Ebola crisis.

=== Stage ===
Gideon has appeared in several stage productions including Fractures, an adaptation of Arthur Miller's A View From The Bridge. He also played Fela Kuti in Fela.. Arrest The Music, is a musical that celebrates the talent of the Nigerian Afrobeat legend. Gideon is also a cast member of Saro The Musical 2, currently touring London.

=== Personal life ===
Gideon is a single father to a daughter born in March 2016.

== Filmography ==
=== Stage plays ===
Year	Title	Role	Ref
	Fractures		
	Fela... Arrest the Music	Fela	
	Saro the Musical 2	Azeez	

=== Television ===
Year	Title	Role
2007	Big Brother Naija	Himself
2008–present	Tinsel	Phillip Ade Williams
	Jacob's Cross	
2014	Poisoned Bait	
	Money Drop	Host
2012	Before 30	
2021	Movement-Japa	
2023	Slum King	

=== Films ===
Year	Title	Role
2006	Relentless	Obi
2014	A Place in the Stars	Kim Dakim
2014	...When Love Happens	Tobena
2015	Anniversary	Harry Banks
2016	93 Days	Morris-Ibeawuchi
2016	Gbomo Gbomo Express	Francis
2016	Gidi Blues	Akinola Kuti
2019	Heaven's Hell	Akanimo
2019	The Perfect Picture: Ten Years Later	Yobanna
2020	Crossroads	Emomotimi Jimoh
2021	Loving Rona	Benny Ramsey
2022	Obsession (2022 film)	John
2023	The Trade	Spark
2023	Egun	
2024	Tòkunbò	Tokunbo

== Awards and nominations ==
Year	Award	Category	Work	Result	Ref
2016	Best of Nollywood Awards	Best Kiss In a Movie	Anniversary	Nominated	
2017	Africa Magic Viewers' Choice Awards	Best Supporting Actor Movie/TV Series	93 Days	Nominated	
2022	Africa Magic Viewers' Choice Awards	Best Actor in A Comedy	Loving Rona	Nominated	
2024	Africa Magic Viewers' Choice Awards	Best Lead Actor	Egun	Nominated	
2025	Africa Magic Viewers' Choice Awards	Best Lead Actor	Tòkunbò	Pending	

== See also ==
- Tinsel (TV series)
- List of Nigerian actors
