= Ameyo Adadevoh =

Nigerian physician

Ameyo Adadevoh OON
- Born: Ameyo Stella Adadevoh; 27 October 1956; Lagos, Lagos State, Nigeria
- Died: 19 August 2014 (aged 57); Lagos, Nigeria
- Education: University of Lagos (MBBS)
- Spouse: Afolabi Emmanuel Cardoso
- Children: Bankole Cardoso
- Parent(s): Babatunde Kwaku Adadevoh; Deborah Regina McIntosh
- Scientific career
- Workplaces: First Consultant Medical Centre

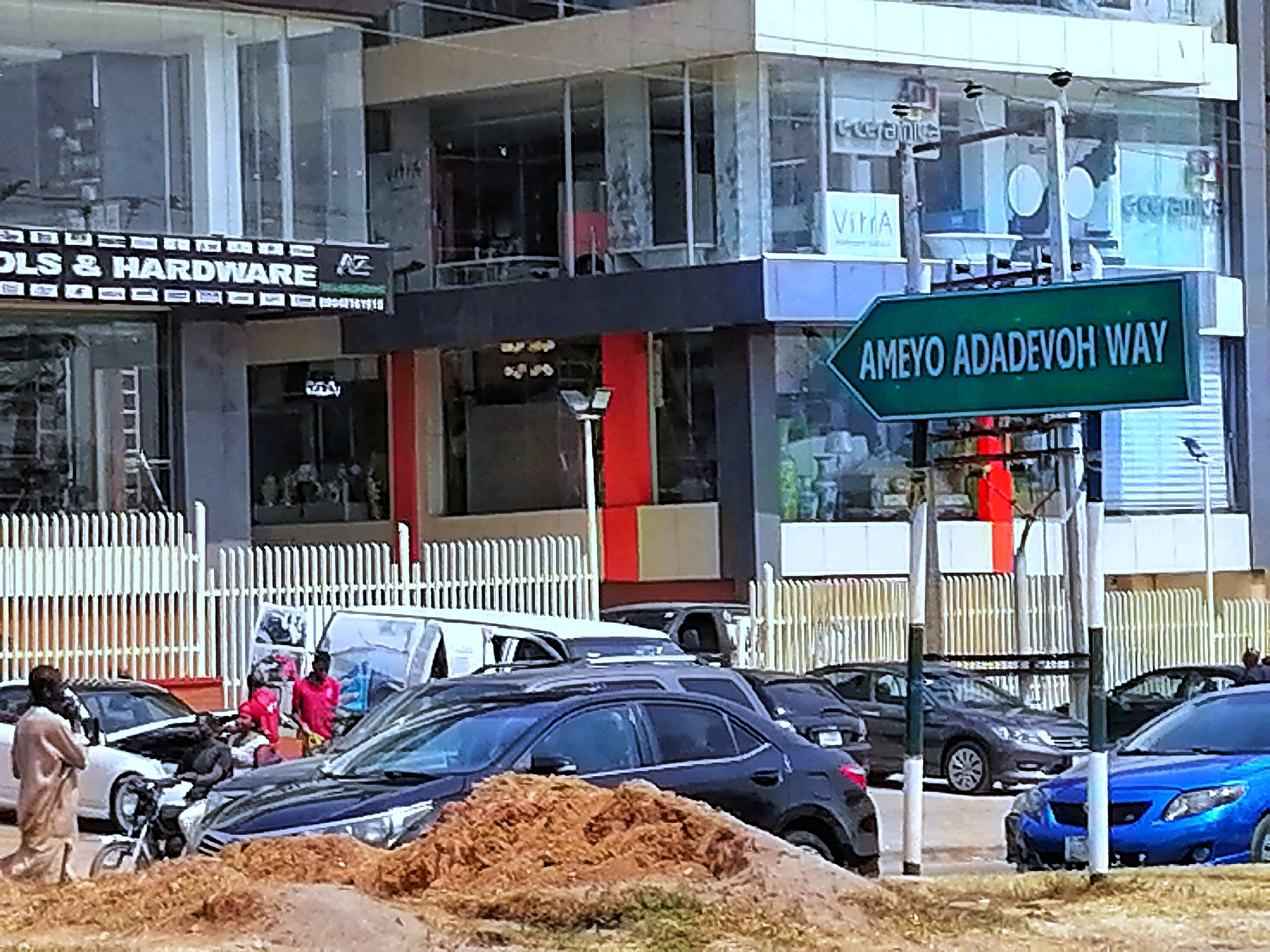
A road named after Ameyo Adadevoh

Ameyo Stella Adadevoh, OON (27 October 1956 – 19 August 2014) was a Nigerian physician.

She is credited with having curbed a wider spread of the Western African Ebola virus epidemic in Nigeria by placing the patient zero, Patrick Sawyer, in quarantine despite pressure from the Liberian government. When threatened by Liberian officials who wanted the patient to be discharged to attend a conference, she resisted the pressure and said, "for the greater public good" she would not release him. She is known for preventing the Nigerian index case from leaving the hospital at the time of diagnosis, thereby playing a key role in curbing the spread of the virus in Nigeria. On 4 August 2014, it was confirmed that she had tested positive for Ebola virus disease and was being treated. Adadevoh died in the afternoon of 19 August 2014.

== Early life and family ==
Ameyo Adadevoh was born in Lagos, Nigeria in October 1956. She spent the majority of her life in Lagos. Her father and great-grandfather, Babatunde Kwaku Adadevoh and Herbert Samuel Macaulay, were both distinguished scientists. Herbert Macaulay was one of the founders of modern Nigeria. Her grandfather was from the Adadevoh family of the Volta Region of Ghana, to which she was very much connected, though she lived in Lagos. Her father Babatunde Kwaku Adadevoh was a physician and former Vice chancellor of the University of Lagos. She was also the grand niece of Nigeria's first president Nnamdi Azikiwe, as well as a great-great-granddaughter of Sarah Forbes Bonetta and a great-great-great-granddaughter of Ajayi Crowther. Adadevoh worked at First Consultant Hospital, where a statue of her great-grandfather exists.

== Education ==
Adadevoh went to preschool at the Mainland Preparatory Primary School in Yaba, Lagos (1961–1962). She spent two years in Boston, Massachusetts before moving back with her family to Lagos. She attended primary school at the Corona School, Yaba in Lagos, Nigeria (1964–1968), then the Queen's School, Ibadan (1969–1974) Nigeria for her secondary school education.

Adadevoh graduated from the University of Lagos College of Medicine with a MBBS degree. She served her one-year mandatory housemanship at Lagos University Teaching Hospital in 1981. She spent her residency at Lagos University Teaching Hospital and obtained her West African College of Physicians credential in 1983. She then went to London to complete her fellowship in endocrinology at Hammersmith Hospital. She spent 21 years at the First Consultants Medical Center in Lagos, Nigeria. There, she served as the Lead Consultant Physician and Endocrinologist.

== Work with swine flu ==
Adadevoh was the first to alert the Nigerian Ministry of Health when H1N1 spread to Nigeria in 2012.

== Work with Ebola virus ==
Adadevoh correctly diagnosed Liberian Patrick Sawyer as Nigeria's first case of Ebola at First Consultant Hospital in Lagos, Nigeria in July 2014. Adadevoh kept Sawyer in the hospital despite his insistence that he simply had a bad case of malaria. Sawyer wanted to attend a business conference in Calabar, Nigeria. Adadevoh led the team that oversaw Sawyer's treatment. Adadevoh also kept him at the hospital despite receiving a request from the Liberian ambassador to release him. She tried to create an isolation area, despite the lack of protective equipment, by raising a wooden barricade outside Sawyer's door. Her work saved Nigeria from widespread infection. At the time of these events, Nigerian doctors were on strike, which could have led to a severe health crisis. She also provided staff with relevant information about the virus, procured protective gear and quickly contacted relevant officials. As a result of her report, the Nigerian government declared a national public health emergency and the Nigerian Ministry of Health set up an Ebola Emergency Operations Center. WHO declared Nigeria to be Ebola-free on 20 October 2014.

== Marriage and children ==
Ameyo Adadevoh married Afolabi Emmanuel Cardoso on 26 April 1986. The couple had one son, Bankole Cardoso.

== Death and legacy ==
Adadevoh died from the Ebola virus in quarantine on 19 August 2014 in Lagos, Nigeria. Her body was decontaminated and cremated by the government. Her family obtained her ashes and held a private interment ceremony while upholding the funeral rites also on 12 September 2014, in Lagos. The Dr. Ameyo Adadevoh Health Trust (DRASA), a non-profit health organization, was created in her honour. The film 93 Days is dedicated to Adadevoh and tells the story of the treatment of Sawyer by Adadevoh and other medical staff at First Consultant Medical Center. The film was directed by Steve Gukas. On 27 October 2018, she was honoured with a Google Doodle posthumously on what would have been her 62nd birthday.

In February 2020, a road was named after Adadevoh in Abuja, Nigeria's capital city. The road "Ameyo Adadevo Way" is directly linked to Ahmadu Bello Way, one of Abuja's major and longest roads. This is one of the first efforts made by the Nigerian government to honour her valuable contribution to the country in the last weeks of her life.

In 2017, a College of Health Sciences female hostel in Aminu Kano Teaching Hospital, Bayero University, Kano was named in her honour.

== Honors and awards ==
Awards	Year	Given By
Posthumous Rotary Award	3 October 2014	Rotary Club of Abuja-Metro
National and Community Service Award	5 October 2014	Trinity House Church
Honorary Doctorate Degree: Doctor of Letters, Honouris Causa	11 October 2014	Baze University
Nollywood Humanity Award	18 October 2014	Nollywood Movies Awards
Arise Award	25 October 2014	Redeemed Christian Church of God
Posthumous Award	3 November 2014	Women in Management, Business Organizations and Public Service (WIMBIZ)
Exemplary Leadership Award	12 November 2014	Pathcare Laboratories
Distinguished Service Award	15 November 2014	Guild of Medical Directors FCT Abuja
Commemorative Plaque	19 November 2014	Nigerian American Medical Foundation
Nigeria's Hero of the Year Award	30 November 2014	The Sun Awards
2014 SEC Integrity Award	1 December 2014	Security and Exchange Commission
Number 1 Humanitarian Everyone Should Know About (2014)	11 December 2014	International Medical Corps UK
Woman Who Shaped 2014	22 December 2014	The Guardian
Number 1 Global Thinker of 2014	23 December 2014	Lo Spazio della Politica
Leading Woman of 2014	23 December 2014	CNN
Person of The Year 2014	31 December 2014	Ekekeee
Nigerian of the Year Award	4 January 2015	National Infinity Magazine
Honorary Doctorate Degree: Doctor of Science, Honouris Causa	17 January 2015	National Open University of Nigeria
First Woman	11 March 2015	First Bank of Nigeria
Officer of the Order of the Niger (OON)	11 October 2022	Federal Republic of Nigeria
