= Austin (TV series) =

British-Australian comedy drama TV series

- Genre: Comedy drama
- Created by: Joe Tucker; Lloyd Woolf; Darren Ashton; Ben Miller
- Written by: Kala Ellis; Adam Zwar; Ben Miller; Darren Ashton; Lloyd Woolf; Joe Tucker
- Starring: Michael Theo; Ben Miller; Sally Phillips; Roy Billing; Gia Carides; Kate Elliott; Zahra Newman; Billie Piper
- Countries of origin: Australia; United Kingdom
- Original language: English
- No. of seasons: 2
- No. of episodes: 16

Production
- Executive producers: Catherine Nebauer; Darren Ashton; Ben Miller; Sally Phillips; Lloyd Woolf; Joe Tucker; Peter Anderson
- Producer: Joe Weatherstone
- Production companies: Northern Pictures; Lincoln Pictures

Original release
- Network: ABC TV
- Release: 9 June 2024 – present

Austin is a comedy drama series created by Joe Tucker, Lloyd Woolf, Darren Ashton, and Ben Miller. The first season, comprising eight episodes, premiered on ABC TV in Australia on 9 June 2024. The main characters are portrayed by Australian newcomer Michael Theo, along with Ben Miller and Sally Phillips. The second season premiered on 27 July 2025, and the third on 11 November 2026.

== Synopsis ==
When on a book tour in Canberra, Australia, recently "cancelled" English children’s author, Julian, is approached by a 28-year-old man named Austin, who claims to be his biological son conceived in London. Austin, who is autistic and lives with his mother and grandfather in Australia, may provide Julian with a path to redemption.

== Cast and characters ==
Michael Theo, an autistic participant on reality series Love on the Spectrum, makes his acting debut as the title character Austin. The series' cast also includes stars Ben Miller as Julian, Sally Phillips as Ingrid, Gia Carides as Austin's mother Mel, Roy Billing as Austin's grandfather Bill, Kate Elliott as Heidi, Zahra Newman as Monica, Charlotte Nicdao as Yolanda, and Billie Piper as herself.

Natalie Abbott joins the cast as Austin's love interest Haley in series 2 and 3.

== Production ==
The first eight-part series was filmed in Canberra, Australia, starting in November 2023, and in England. It was produced by Northern Pictures and Lincoln Pictures.

It is supported by the ACT Government, Screen Australia, ITV Studios, and Screen Canberra.

The series has Catherine Nebauer, Darren Ashton, Ben Miller, Sally Phillips, Lloyd Woolf, Joe Tucker, Peter Anderson as executive producers, with Joe Weatherstone as the producer of the series.

On 11 September 2024, the ABC announced that a second season of the series was in development. On 22 November the show was renewed for a second season.

For the third season in 2026, production moved from Canberra to South Australia, with filming taking place in the Adelaide Hills and the SAFC's Adelaide Studios.

== Broadcast ==
Austin premiered on 9 June 2024 in Australia on ABC TV and iview.

On 11 July 2024, it was announced the series would be broadcast on the BBC's television channels and its iPlayer service in the United Kingdom, due to an acquisition from ITV Studios. This came after the series was originally announced in February 2024 to be broadcast on ITV in the UK later in 2024.

On 19 September 2024, it was announced the series would be broadcast on the Canadian Broadcasting Corporation's CBC Gem streaming service in Canada, debuting on the service on 18 October 2024, after CBC acquired the series from ITV.

The second season premiered on 27 July 2025 on ABC TV and iview in Australia, and the third on 11 November 2026 .

== Episodes ==
=== Series overview ===
Season	Episodes	Originally aired	
Season	Episodes	First aired	Last aired
1	8	9 June 2024	28 July 2024
2	8	27 July 2025	14 September 2025
3	8	11 November 2026	TBA

=== Season 1 (2024) ===
No. overall	No. in season	Title	Original release date	Aus. viewers
1	1	Episode 1	9 June 2024	806,000
Julian Hartswood, a best-selling British children's author who is partway through an Australian book tour with his wife and long-time illustrator Ingrid, wakes up one morning to the shocking revelation that one of his retweets the previous day was from a neo-Nazi influencer, which quickly ruins his own reputation and derails the rest of his tour. After Julian and Ingrid narrowly avoid a public appearance that he unknowingly arranged at a far-right bookstore, their day is further complicated by the sudden arrival of Austin Hogan, an autistic man from Canberra who claims to be Julian's son; Austin's explanation of when he was conceived also upsets Ingrid, who realises that she and Julian were already a couple when it happened. Julian, trying to keep his life at least partly on track while his publishers manage the fallout from the retweet, reluctantly accepts an invitation to meet Austin's mother and grandfather, although Ingrid insists on coming along so she can learn the truth.
2	2	Episode 2	16 June 2024	577,000
3	3	Episode 3	23 June 2024	481,000
4	4	Episode 4	30 June 2024	428,000
5	5	Episode 5	7 July 2024	395,000
6	6	Episode 6	14 July 2024	404,000
7	7	Episode 7	21 July 2024	355,000
8	8	Episode 8	28 July 2024	N/A

=== Season 2 (2025) ===
No. overall	No. in season	Title	Original release date	Aus. viewers
9	1	Episode 1	27 July 2025	512,000
10	2	Episode 2	3 August 2025	450,000
11	3	Episode 3	10 August 2025	420,000
12	4	Episode 4	17 August 2025	458,000
13	5	Episode 5	24 August 2025	415,000
14	6	Episode 6	31 August 2025	435,000
15	7	Episode 7	7 September 2025	350,000
16	8	Episode 8	14 September 2025	385,000

=== Season 3 (2026) ===
No. overall	No. in season	Title	Original release date	Aus. viewers
17	1	Episode 1	11 November 2026	302,000

== Reception ==
David Knox of TV Tonight rated the series at 3½ out of 5 stars, writing about Michael Theo's performance, "The authenticity, warmth and humour that made him so beloved in Love on the Spectrum is on display as the neurodivergent, optimistic son, with the awkward one-liners... Theo nails his scenes alongside more experienced performers, with all the required comic timing". Craig Mathieson of The Sydney Morning Herald rated the series at 3½ out of 5 stars, writing about the series' connection to autism, "Austin is not a show about autism. It has an autistic character in one of the lead roles, but the central focus is the father and son connection between Julian and Austin". Anthony Morris of ScreenHub rated the series at 3 stars, writing about its story, "Having an extremely predictable story isn't necessarily a bad thing in a comedy." Luke Buckmaster of Guardian Australia rated the series at 4 out of 5 stars, writing about the series' performance, "The plotline involving Julian making a documentary about himself gets a tad silly, but even when the story slips a little, the writing and performances never lose their wit and sharpness. Another season, please!"
