= For the Love of God (disambiguation) =

For the Love of God is a sculpture of a diamond-encrusted human skull by artist Damien Hirst.

For the Love of God may also refer to:

- For the Love of God (instrumental), a song by Steve Vai
- For the Love of God (2007 film), a short animated film starring Steve Coogan and Ian McKellen
- For the Love of God (2011 film), a Canadian drama film
- For the Love of God (documentary), a 2015 documentary
- For uses in religion, see love of God
