= Click and collect =

Click and collect may refer to:

- Alternative name for Omnichannel retail strategy
- Click & Collect, a British comedy TV film
