= David Fynn =

Welsh-Irish actor, producer, and screenwriter

- Occupations: Actor; producer; screenwriter
- Years active: 2006–present
- Known for: Undateable

David Fynn is a British-Irish actor, producer and screenwriter, he received a nomination for the Olivier Award for Best Actor in a Musical in 2017, playing Dewey Finn in School of Rock. He is most notable for playing Brett in the NBC TV sitcom Undateable (2014–2016).

Other credits include Spooks (2006), The Inbetweeners (2009), Peep Show (2010), Doctor Who (2010), Black Mirror (2011), Life’s Too Short (2011), Pete versus Life (2011), Game of Thrones (2012), Big Bad World (2013), Mayday (2013), Sherlock (2014), The Job Lot (2014), Banana (2015), The Pembrokeshire Murders (2021), The Thief, His Wife and the Canoe (2022), and Am I Being Unreasonable? (2022-2025).

== Theatre ==
His theatre credits include She Stoops to Conquer at the National Theatre, (Evening Standard Nomination), Romeo and Juliet at the National Theatre, The 25th Annual Putnam County Spelling Bee at the Donmar Warehouse, Mojo at the Royal Shakespeare Company, After the Party in the West End, and Starving at Theatre503. He trained at the Webber Douglas Academy of Dramatic Art.

He began playing Dewey Finn in the West End cast of Andrew Lloyd Webber's musical School of Rock (based on the 2003 film with Jack Black) in October 2016 at the New London Theatre, for which he received a nomination for the Olivier Award for Best Actor in a Musical in 2017. In 2026, he began playing the main role in Beetlejuice (musical) at the Prince Edward Theatre.

== Television ==
He made his television debut in 2006 in Spooks. include The Inbetweeners (2009), Peep Show (2010), Doctor Who (2010), Black Mirror (2011), Life’s Too Short (2011), Pete versus Life (2011), Game of Thrones (2012), Big Bad World (2013), Mayday (2013), Sherlock (2014), The Job Lot (2014), and Banana (2015).

He is most notable for playing Brett in 36 episodes of the NBC TV sitcom Undateable (2014–2016). He starred alongside Olivia Cooke and Anthony Head in the historical drama miniseries Vanity Fair (2018).

In January 2021, he appeared as one of the lead characters, journalist Jonathan Hill, in the ITV miniseries The Pembrokeshire Murders (2021). In 2022, he played the part of a journalist in ITV's The Thief, His Wife and the Canoe (2022), and Alex in the BBC's Am I Being Unreasonable? (2022-2025).

== Filmography ==
=== Film ===
Year	Title	Role	Notes
2010	Leap Year	Agent	
2010	Trackdown	Fat Mike	
2011	The Somnambulists	Man 2	
2011	Showreel	Ben	
2012	Deviation	Justin	
2012	National Theatre Live: She Stoops to Conquer	Tony Lumpkin	
2013	The Look of Love	Interviewer	
2019	I'd Like to Be Alone Now	Sam	
2019	Married Young	David	
2021	The Mauritanian	Kent	
2022	National Theatre Live: Much Ado About Nothing	Dogberry	
2023	Coffee Wars	George	
2023	Trolls Band Together	Biggie	Voice role
2024	Here	Leo	

=== Television ===
Year	Title	Role	Notes
2006	Spooks	Policeman	Episode: "The Message"
2009	The Inbetweeners	Wolfie	Episode: "Work Experience"
2010	Doctor Who	Marcellus	Episode: "The Pandorica Opens"
2010	Peep Show	Games Shop Assistant	Episode: "Man Jam"
2011	Doctors	Barry Towers	Episode: "The Nun's Tale"
2011	Life's Too Short	Groom	Episode: "Episode 2"
2011	Pete versus Life	Manfred	Series regular; 6 episodes
2011	Black Mirror	Oliver	Episode: "Fifteen Million Merits"
2012	Game of Thrones	Rennick	Episode: "Garden of Bones"
2012	Parents	Ed	Episode: "Episode 2"
2012	Doubt on Loan	Eddie	Television film
2013	Mayday	James Spicer	Miniseries; 5 episodes
2013	Big Bad World	Oakley	Series regular; 8 episodes
2014	Sherlock	Howard Shilcott	Episode: "The Empty Hearse"
2014	The Job Lot	Tyler Kerrigan	Episode: "Workshop"
2014–2016	Undateable	Brett	Series regular; 36 episodes
2015	Banana	Bruce Bevis	Episode: "Episode 2"
2015	The Sixth Lead	Bartender	Episode: "The Perfect Joke"
2017	Porn Again	Terry	Miniseries; 3 episodes
2018	Vanity Fair	Jos Sedley	Miniseries; 5 episodes
2018–2019	Trolls: The Beat Goes On!	Biggie	Recurring role; 43 episodes; Voice only
2019	Whiskey Cavalier	Todd	Recurring role; 2 episodes
2019	Best Intentions	Andy Banks	Television film
2020	Influential	David	Episode: "The IG Model - SexyKatie_Official"
2020	Madagascar: A Little Wild	Sir Braxton	Episode: "A Tale of Two Kitties"; Voice only
2020–2022	Trolls: TrollsTopia	Biggie	Recurring role; 14 episodes; Voice only
2021	The Pembrokeshire Murders	Jonathan Hill	Miniseries; 3 episodes
2021	Short Circuit		Episode: "No. 2 to Kettering"; Voice only
2022	The Thief, His Wife and the Canoe	David Leigh	Miniseries; 2 episodes
2022	Am I Being Unreasonable?	Alex	Series regular; 6 episodes
2022	Avenue 5	Judd	Series regular; 6 episodes
2023–2024	Not Quite Narwhal	Cedric	Recurring role; 4 episodes; Voice only
2024	Belgravia: The Next Chapter	Ross	Series regular; 7 episodes
2024	Daddy Issues	Derek	Main Cast
2025	Lazarus	Seth McGovern	Main Cast
