= Gbemisola Ikumelo =

British actress, comedian, writer (born 1986)

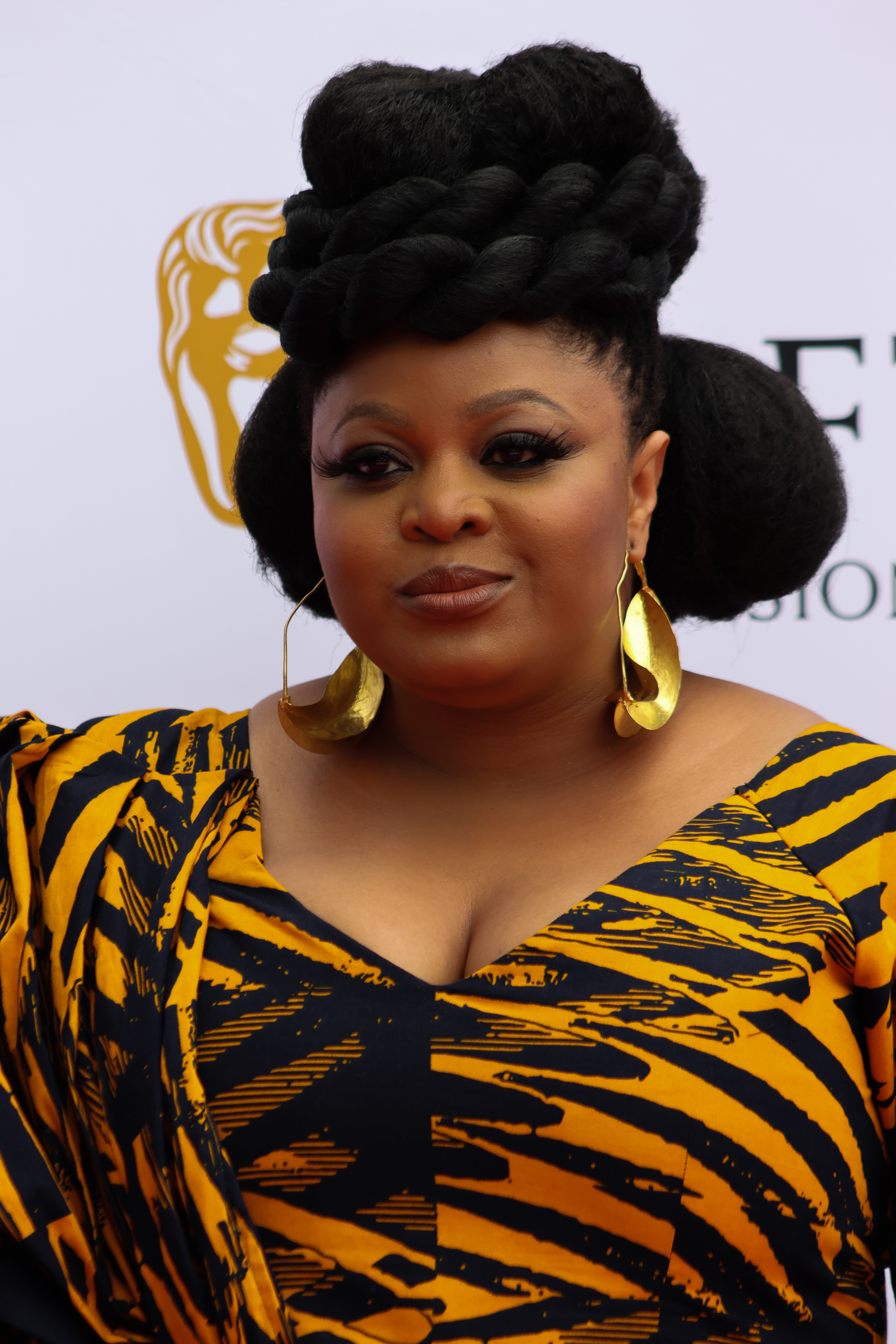
- Ikumelo at the 2026 British Academy Television Awards
- Born: 1986 (age 39–40); Ondo, Nigeria
- Education: Queen Margaret University (BA)
- Occupations: Actress, comedian, writer
- Known for: Famalam
- Notable work: Brain in Gear
- Awards: Bafta (2020 & 2024)

Gbemisola Ikumelo (bem-ee-SO-lah ick-oo-MEL-oh; born 1986) is a British actress, comedian, and writer. In 2020, she won two BAFTA awards for her short Brain in Gear and in 2024 for best female performance in a comedy. She also won two awards from the Royal Television Society, one for her role in her show Famalam and another for comedy performance in the BBC show Black Ops.

== Life and career ==
Ikumelo, who is of Yoruba heritage, was born in Ondo, Nigeria, and migrated to England as a child. She aspired to be a serious actress and at the age of 15 she was accepted by London's National Youth Theatre. She went on to study and train in Acting in Scotland at the Queen Margaret University School of Drama in Edinburgh, graduating in 2003. In October that year, she was the narrator for a radio drama by Margaret Busby about warrior queen Yaa Asantewaa, which was serialized on BBC Radio Four's Woman's Hour, directed by Pam Solomon. Ikumelo's break came when she was cast in Sunny D in 2015, playing the main character (Dane Baptiste)'s twin sister.

She came to notice when her sketch show Famalam appeared on the BBC. She appeared in the pilot episode of BBC sitcom Mandy as Shola. In 2021, she received an award for best female comedy performance in Famalam from the Royal Television Society.

Ikumelo was awarded a TV BAFTA for her short film, titled Brain in Gear, in July 2020.

Ikumelo is a main cast member on the Amazon series A League of Their Own. It concerns the creation of a women's American baseball team during the Second World War and it is adapted from the 1992 film of the same title.

Ikumelo was chosen in 2022 to star in a new BBC television series titled Black Ops, with actor Hammed Animashaun and Famalam's producer Akemnji Ndifornyen. Ikumelo played a woman who signed up to be a community police officer to improve her community, but she and her partner were involved in complication over six episodes. That series was commissioned for a second series, for which she won an acting award.

Ikumelo was also named in 2022 for the cast of a remake of the 1989 American action film Road House, with Jake Gyllenhaal, Daniela Melchior and Billy Magnussen.

Ikumelo received acclaim for her 2023 performance in Lynn Nottage's play Clyde's at the Donmar Warehouse, London, being described by Sarah Hemming of the Financial Times as "spectacularly scary" in the title role.

In August 2025, Ikumelo was announced as a contestant on the second series of the comedy reality television show LOL: Last One Laughing UK, released on 19 March 2026.
