= School of Rock (musical) =

Rock musical

- The Musical
- Music: Andrew Lloyd Webber
- Lyrics: Glenn Slater
- Book: Julian Fellowes
- Basis: School of Rock by Mike White
- Premiere: November 9, 2015: Winter Garden Theatre, New York City
- Productions: 2015 Broadway; 2016 West End; 2017 North American tour 2021 UK tour
- Awards: Laurence Olivier Award for Outstanding Achievement in Music

School of Rock is a rock musical with music by Andrew Lloyd Webber, lyrics by Glenn Slater and a book by Julian Fellowes. Based on the 2003 film of the same name, written by Mike White, the musical follows Dewey Finn, an out-of-work rock singer and guitarist who pretends to be a substitute teacher at a prestigious prep school. After identifying the musical talent in his students, Dewey forms a band of fifth-graders, in an attempt to win the upcoming Battle of the Bands contest.

The musical made its Broadway debut and world premiere on December 6, 2015, at the Winter Garden Theatre, following previews from November 9, 2015, directed by Laurence Connor and starring Alex Brightman as Dewey Finn and Sierra Boggess as Rosalie Mullins. The musical made its West End debut at the Gillian Lynne Theatre on November 14, 2016.

== Background ==
The musical is based on the comedy film School of Rock (2003). That film was produced on a budget of $35 million, earning over $131 million in global box office receipts. The plot followed struggling rock singer and guitarist Dewey Finn, who is kicked out of the band No Vacancy and subsequently disguises himself as a substitute teacher at a prestigious prep school. After witnessing the musical talent in his students, Dewey forms a band of fifth-graders to attempt to win the upcoming Battle of the Bands.

In an April 2013 interview, Andrew Lloyd Webber first revealed that he had purchased the stage rights to Richard Linklater's film, and planned to make its adaptation into a musical his next project after completing the West End show Stephen Ward, centering on the 1963 Profumo affair. The composer stated, "There may be songs for me in it, but it's obviously got songs in it as it stands," and that he would be going from Stephen Ward, "sort of a chamber musical, to a musical about kids playing the guitar." In May 2014, it was revealed that the show was likely to receive its world premiere on Broadway rather than in London's West End due to more relaxed child labour laws in the United States and the fact that the American subject matter fitted Broadway. Webber also credits various locations of the original School of Rock that "...produce the sort of kids required who can actually perform in the show" and that Britain would need similar schools for the show to move to London.

On 18 December 2014, an official announcement was made of the musical, with a world premiere on Broadway set for Autumn 2015. This would be the first time since Jesus Christ Superstar in 1971 that a Lloyd Webber musical would premiere on Broadway rather than in the West End. It would also mark a return for the composer to the Winter Garden Theatre, where his Cats ran for 18 years.

Speaking of his vision for the musical, Lloyd Webber suggested that it would focus more on the stories of Dewey's young students than the film did, stating "It has to be a bit more rounded. I'd quite like to know more about the children and their parents." Speaking about the music he explained the need for additional music rather than simply using the film's full soundtrack: "you can't do heavy metal for hours and hours in the theatre – everyone would be screaming. So they have to be theatrical songs too. And we've obviously got to use the iconic songs from the original show. It would be a shame not to do a Stevie Nicks song."

The script of School of Rock was written by Downton Abbey creator Julian Fellowes and Laurence Connor was engaged as the initial director. JoAnn M. Hunter provided choreography, while Anna Louizos was responsible for the set and costume design.

== Synopsis ==
=== Act I ===
The musical begins with a performance by the band No Vacancy. The band's guitarist, Dewey Finn, repeatedly attempts to upstage the lead singer ("I'm Too Hot for You”) which leads to the band agreeing to kick him out for his antics after Dewey leaves the stage. The next morning, Dewey is awoken in his bedroom by his longtime friend, Ned Schneebly, and Ned's domineering girlfriend, Patty Di Marco. Patty demands rent from Dewey while Ned cowers behind her. After they leave, Dewey goes about his day, getting kicked out of his band and fired from his job at a record store, all while dreaming about getting his break and becoming a superstar ("When I Climb to the Top of Mount Rock"). Afterwards, Dewey receives a call from Rosalie Mullins, principal of the prestigious Horace Green School. She asks to speak to Ned, saying that the school has an open substitute teacher position that will pay over nine hundred dollars a week—enough to meet the rent. Pretending to be Ned, Dewey accepts the position.

At Horace Green, Rosalie does her best to keep everything running smoothly while greeting parents who come to drop off their children ("Horace Green Alma Mater"). Dewey arrives late both hungover and unprepared for the day, and the principal warns that "Ned" will be expected to meet the school's high standards ("Here at Horace Green"). Dewey enters his classroom and introduces himself as Mr. Schneebly. His thirteen students are immediately wary of him, and one of them, uptight Summer Hathaway, attempts to explain to him how the classes manage, and Dewey is disgusted by the rigid system. With no food to treat his hangover, Dewey spends most of the day sleeping, leaving the students to run wild.

At the apartment, Patty asks Ned to go on a jog with her, but he declines, claiming he has a lot of papers to grade. Understanding, Patty goes. However, as soon as she's gone, Ned pulls out his Guitar Hero console and begins playing. When Dewey comes home, he joins Ned and they discuss various topics such as teaching and their old band ("Variation 7”). After their game, Dewey attempts to convince Ned to rejoin him in their music career, by reminding him of all the perks of being a rockstar ("Children of Rock”). However, Patty arrives and breaks up the men's reminiscing session. Angry at Dewey, Patty reminds him that he's nothing more than a dreamer who will never succeed in the rock business, and gives him an ultimatum: pay the rent in thirty days, or they will kick him out ("Give Up Your Dreams”).

The next day at school, Dewey argues with another teacher and hears music coming from one of the classrooms. Upon learning that his students are in music class with Rosalie ("Queen of the Night"), he inquires in amazement about what instruments they play. Dewey then tells his students that they're now a part of his new band set to compete in the Battle of the Bands. First, he puts together the instrumentals of his band: Zack on electric guitar, Katie on bass guitar, Lawrence on keyboards, and Freddy on drums. He also makes two of the girls—Shonelle and Marcy—backup singers, and two other girls—Madison and Sophie—roadies. Then he moves onto technical jobs. Mason is put in charge of lights, James is made the security officer, and an ecstatic Billy is made the band's stylist. Summer is angry that she hasn't been given a job and says "groupies are sluts" in response to Dewey's first suggestion. Dewey then makes her the band's manager. The only student left without a job is Tomika, the shy new girl ("You're in the Band"). Confident about their prospects, Dewey hands out famous CDs to the students to listen to as homework ("You're in the Band (Reprise)”).

The children go home, and a glimpse is seen in some of their home lives:

- Freddy tells his father about the music he was assigned to listen to, but his father belittles him, saying that he's not smart like the other children at Horace Green.
- Billy is reading a Vogue magazine disguised as Sports Illustrated on account of pressure from his father to take up football.
- Tomika tells her adoptive fathers that she's not making friends or doing well in her new school, but her parents dismiss her since they love Horace Green.
- Zack attempts to talk to his father about his day, but his father is on a business call and shouts at Zack for trying to speak to him, telling him to go away.

Frustrated, Zack, Tomika, Billy, Freddy, and the other students lament that they have so much to tell and offer their parents and the world, but they just won't listen to them yet ("If Only You Would Listen"). The kids are concerned about what they will play, leading to Dewey improvising the first version of ("In the End of Time (A Cappella Version)").

In the Faculty Lounge, the other teachers complain that the children have become undisciplined under Dewey ("Faculty Quadrille"). In the classroom, the band continues practicing Dewey's new song ("In the End of Time (Practice Version)"). After playing, Dewey tells everyone they're doing great. However, Zack is playing in an uptight and rigid manner, and Dewey says that Zack needs to get angry at "the Man" in order to really rock. He explains that the man is responsible for everything wrong with the world, and Dewey and the kids get angry and shout about how they're going to stick it to the Man ("Stick it to the Man"). Shonelle and Marcy say that they should call the band School of Rock. On account of being stuck in school, Dewey and the kids end up sneaking out of the building in order to make it to the Battle of the Bands auditions on time. The children and Dewey sadly arrive late at the auditions. With the manager about to leave, Summer convinces him to stay with a lie about a terminal illness and the class is able to compete ("In the End of Time (The Audition)"). They qualify and celebrate their success ("Stick it to the Man (Reprise)").

=== Act II ===
Thirty-six hours before the Battle of the Bands, the students are hard at work preparing for the event while Dewey attends a faculty conference. The students conclude that the one outstanding issue is the costumes, which Billy has yet to show anybody. He argues that they aren't finished yet, but Summer makes him show them anyway. Using Lawrence as an unwilling model, Billy shows everyone, and they hate them. Annoyed but not disheartened, Billy goes back to the drawing board ("Time to Play"). At the faculty meeting which Rosalie uses to stress the importance of parents' night, Dewey discovers that she is secretly a rocker, and loves Stevie Nicks. Dewey panics when he gets back to the classroom and begins to think of a cover. Tomika summons the courage to speak to him saying that she wants to sing. When Dewey asks why she didn't respond to the call for backup singers, she states that she's a lead singer and can’t sing backup. Although initially too nervous, Tomika begins to sing when others are not looking and it turns out that she has the voice of a perfect angel ("Amazing Grace").

Upon hearing that Rosalie is coming, students quickly cover their instruments with Thanksgiving-themed items and Dewey breaks into a fake lesson. When she challenges this, Dewey accuses other teachers of being on crack before admitting that he uses music to teach "boring" subjects. After arguing that there are no boring subjects, Rosalie announces that she will be sitting in for the rest of Dewey's lesson. Nervous, Dewey pulls out his guitar and improvises a song about math ("Math Is a Wonderful Thing"). Rosalie is unimpressed, but Dewey decides to ask her out to a bar regardless. Later that night, Rosalie and Dewey meet at the bar, and, after having a few drinks, Dewey plays a Stevie Nicks song on the jukebox, causing Rosalie to let loose and laments about how she feels she has lost her inner music. Stating that Dewey has reminded her about it, she promises that if the parents' meeting goes well the next day, she will help Dewey and School of Rock go to the Battle of the Bands ("Where Did the Rock Go?"). Dewey impulsively kisses Rosalie, and they part ways.

Dewey arrives home just as Patty and Ned are going through the mail. Prompted by the discovery of Dewey's paycheck made out to Ned, Dewey explains his impersonation idea. Ned goes into a panic attack, but Dewey manages to calm him down and make him promise not to tell Patty. The next day, the students go to rehearse their song, but then Zack reveals that he wrote his own song for the band in his free time. Dewey is floored by Zack's talent, and has Zack teach the song to the rest of the band ("School of Rock (Band Practice)"). However, in the middle of the practice, Rosalie unwittingly brings the students' parents into the classroom, and they are appalled by what is going on. Focusing on the talent of each child, Dewey slowly convinces the parents to see the band in a positive light until Patty and Ned burst in. Having extracted the information from Ned, Patty reveals that Dewey is not Ned Schneebly and sends the parents into a rage, and Dewey and the children escape in the commotion ("Dewey's Confession").

As Rosalie paces nervously in the halls, she finds Mason and reminds him that Dewey isn't who the students think he is. Mason counters that he is a role-model regardless of his name. Touched by this, Rosalie misleads the parents to buy the children more time. The children use this time to reinvigorate Dewey who has given up on his dream and returned to his room. Led by Tomika, they all explain how much they need him ("If Only You Would Listen (Reprise)"). Discovering that they stole the bus to head to the Battle, Dewey's dream is reignited ("Stick it to the Man (Reprise)"). Patty makes one last attempt to stop them, but Ned finally stands up to her and accompanies them to the Battle. The band arrives just as No Vacancy is finishing up their performance ("I'm Too Hot for You (Reprise)"). Dewey decides that they should play Zack's song and accepts new costumes from Billy. The parents arrive but are not allowed backstage by the security guards. As the students go to perform, Zack's father begins shouting at his son not to go onstage, telling him that School of Rock is ridiculous and stupid. Finally having enough, Zack stands up to his father and tells him that the band means more to him than he does, and then goes to play with the band.

The School of Rock performs Zack's song, and the crowd goes wild. Their parents watch on from an empty box seat, and each of them slowly fall in love with the band and how amazing their children are. Each of the instrumental students gets a solo, and Tomika sings lead with Dewey as well. By the end, Zack's father is frozen with pride and has to be pulled away by Summer's mother ("School of Rock (Teacher's Pet)"). After the performance, Rosalie and the band's parents congratulate the group, as well as Ned who has decked out in full heavy metal gear for the Battle. Dewey watches the parents and their kids, and finally feels as though he has accomplished something worthwhile. Patty then enters with a police officer and tries to get Dewey arrested for fraud, but Rosalie convinces the officer that Mr. Finn is Horace Green's official Band Coach. The winner of the competition is announced as No Vacancy, but Dewey assures everyone that winning didn't really matter because they did something even more special. To please an enthralled crowd, the band plays an encore ("Stick It to the Man (Encore)"). After their song, Dewey and Rosalie kiss again, and Rosalie mixes her classical singing with the heavy rock music of School of Rock, implying that a change is coming to Horace Green and its curriculum because of the band and Dewey ("Finale").

== Characters ==
=== Adults ===
- Dewey Finn: The protagonist, Dewey is a struggling rockstar who is kicked out of his band, No Vacancy, at the beginning of the show. In need of money, he impersonates Ned Schneebly and gets a substitute teacher job at the Horace Green School, where he founds the band School of Rock with the students, who are musical prodigies. Dewey is usually wild, desperate, naive, dull-witted, and somewhat more childish than his students.
- Rosalie Mullins: Rosalie is the principal of Horace Green and is very uptight and traditional at school. However, she feels an intense amount of pressure from work, which is what causes her to be so high strung. She has a secret love of rock and roll music and longs to be as carefree as she once was.
- Ned Schneebly: Dewey's longtime friend, former bandmate, and current roommate. Ned is very easily manipulated and tends to allow people to walk all over him—especially his girlfriend, Patty. He still loves rock and roll music but is held down by Patty. He is a substitute teacher and is impersonated by Dewey at Horace Green.
- Patty Di Marco: Ned's girlfriend. She is very demanding and domineering and doesn't allow Ned to make any decisions for himself—despite constantly reprimanding him for his inability to stand up for himself. She hates Dewey and wants him out of the apartment and out of her and Ned's lives.

=== Students ===
- Summer (Manager): Summer is a high-achieving girl who hates nonsense. Initially, she absolutely despises Dewey, but comes to love the band—or, perhaps, the power that comes with it—and is willing to do anything to see it achieve. Summer is one of the brightest students at Horace Green, as shown by the fact that she has significantly more gold stars on the achievement board than any of her peers. Through the show, she is convinced that winning the "Battle of the Bands" will look good on her college application.
- Tomika (Vocals): Tomika transfers to Horace Green after being accepted off of the waiting list. She is shy and doesn't speak to anyone at school and feels as though she's not as intelligent as the other students. However, it turns out that she is a highly gifted singer and becomes the secondary singer in School of Rock, behind only Dewey. She is adopted by a gay male couple, whereas in the movie she had her two biological parents.
- Zack (Guitarist): Zack is the son of an uptight businessman with no time for his children. Because of that, Zack keeps a great deal bottled inside and has issues with being too stiff with his guitar playing at first. However, Dewey discovers that Zack is actually a musical prodigy, as shown when Zack writes the band's anthem, Teacher's Pet, after only a month or so of playing rock music.
- Lawrence (Keyboardist): Lawrence is an unconfident boy and is also gluten intolerant. He initially believes that he isn't cool enough to be a part of the band, but Dewey is able to convince him that he's amazing. At the show's beginning, Lawrence's only friend is Tomika, but he doesn't think she counts because she never talks. He's a very imaginative keyboard player, and talented at improvising.
- Freddy (Drummer): Freddy is a rambunctious boy, as shown when he repeatedly slams cymbals together disruptively during music class. He is constantly told he isn't intelligent—by both his own father and Summer—but Freddy and Dewey both think that he's intelligent in a different way, and that Freddy's father just doesn't see that.
- Katie (Bassist): Katie is a quiet, serious girl who keeps mostly to herself. She plays the cello at school but is quick to pick up the bass at Dewey's encouragement. She is stone-faced when she plays, and takes her instrument and the band very seriously, although not as much as Summer takes managing.
- Shonelle and Marcy (Backup Vocals): Shonelle and Marcy are quieter girls who tend to blend into the background. They are School of Rock's backup singers, and also talented dancers. Dewey tells their parents that they have the voices of angels. Their film counterparts are Alicia and Marta.
- Billy (Stylist): Billy is a flamboyant boy with a love of style and fashion magazines. He is disgusted with Dewey's outfit choices, and how no one else in the band shares his artistic vision but is confident in his styling choices regardless. Billy comes from a long line of football players, and his father wants him to be one as well, but Billy has absolutely no interest in doing so.
- Mason (Tech): Mason is a super-smart, nerdy, tech-savvy boy who designs all the lighting and special effects for the band using his laptop. He's also very forgiving, as he's the first to accept Rosalie when she decides to drop her high-strung act, hugging her and saying, "You're the best, Miss Mullins". In addition, he also appears to have experience with pyrotechnics. His film counterpart is Gordon.
- James (Security): James is a gruff and tough boy who becomes the band's security guard. During rehearsals, Dewey has him stand near the door, and if James sees anyone potentially who might blow School of Rock's cover—like Rosalie or one of the teachers—he has the job of alerting the rest of the band so they can hide the instruments. His film counterpart is Frankie.
- Sophie and Madison (Roadies): Sophie and Madison are School of Rock's roadies, but, since the band doesn't go on tour, they are essentially backup dancers. Each girl is a talented dancer, and they could often be found together, much like Shonelle and Marcy. The roadies usually dance near Freddy and the drum set. Their film counterparts are Michelle and Eleni.

== Production history ==
=== Broadway (2015-2019) ===
Auditions began on January 19, 2015 for children ages nine through fifteen. Some recruiting was done through the School of Rock after-school educational program (which predated the film by several years) and open calls were held in New York at the Winter Garden, in Chicago and in Los Angeles. The musical made its Broadway debut and world premiere on December 6, 2015, at the Winter Garden Theatre, following previews from November 9, 2015, directed by Laurence Connor and starring Alex Brightman as Dewey Finn and Sierra Boggess as Rosalie Mullins.

The production closed on January 20, 2019, after 1,309 performances.

=== West End (2016–2020) ===
The West End production opened at the Gillian Lynne Theatre (then the New London Theatre) beginning previews on 24 October 2016, with an opening night on 14 November. As it was originally announced to open at the London Palladium in 2017, Lloyd Webber revealed that the production was able to open several months earlier than anticipated due to finding the child musician actors easily.

Anna Louizos' scenery was modified to fit the architecture of the Gillian Lynne Theatre from the traditional proscenium arch stage at Winter Garden Theatre. Changes included the removal of the pre-show curtain, the use of a revolving stage and action taking place in the aisles of the stalls. While the show remains to be set in America, the script has been adapted to include some minor references for a British audience.

The original cast included David Fynn as Dewey Finn, Florence Andrews as Rosalie Mullins, Oliver Jackson as Ned Schneebly, Preeya Kalidas as Patty Di Marco and Gary Trainor as alternate Dewey. Fynn left the role of Dewey on May 15, 2017. Fynn's regular alternate, Gary Trainor took over the role, with newcomer Stephen Leask as alternate Dewey. Most of the original adult cast had their final performance on November 13, 2017. Alan Pearson took over as Ned, with Stephen Leask and Michelle Francis as Dewey and Patty, respectively (Leask had previously been alternate). Andrews continued her role as Rosalie, and Craig Gallivan was given the role of alternate Dewey. Along with the new cast came adjustments to script and alterations to several songs. The song "Children of Rock" was deleted from the show in Act I and replaced with additional dialogue as well as an extension of the song "Here at Horace Green". From 22 August 2018, the cast was led by Gallivan as Dewey, Laura Tebbutt as Rosalie and Jake Sharp as alternate Dewey. On 19 August 2019, Gallivan left the production, and from 21 August 2019, Noel Sullivan played Dewey.

The West End production closed on 1 March 2020 after just over a 3-year run with David Fynn returning to the role of Dewey, with the announcement of a UK and Ireland tour to begin in February 2021.

=== North American tour (2017–2019) ===
A North American tour opened on September 30, 2017, at the Auditorium Theatre in Rochester, New York. Rob Colletti starred as Dewey Finn, with Lexie Dorsett Sharp as Rosalie Mullins. On October 1, 2018, Merritt David Janes replaced Colletti as Dewey Finn. The tour closed on June 9, 2019 at the San Jose Center for Performing Arts, San Jose, California, after 88 weeks and 63 cities.

=== Australian tour (2018–2020) ===
School of Rock's Australian production opened at Her Majesty's Theatre, Melbourne in 2018, on 31 October with a 9 November premiere.

After closing in Melbourne, the show embarked on a national tour of China beginning in Shanghai before continuing to Beijing, Guangzhou, Xiamen, Shenzhen and Suzhou. The production returned to Australia, where it played at QPAC in Brisbane in July 2019. School of Rock then played at Auckland, New Zealand in September 2019.School of Rock played at the Capitol Theatre in Sydney from November 2019 to March 2020. The production was scheduled to play at Adelaide Festival Centre in Adelaide from March 2020 to April 2020. However, all shows were cancelled due to COVID-19 safety regulations and concerns.

=== U.K. and Ireland tour (2021–2022) ===
A UK and Ireland tour was expected to start on 13 February 2021 at The Alexandra, Birmingham, but it was postponed due to the COVID-19 pandemic. The tour finally opened on 9 September 2021 at the Hull New Theatre, Kingston upon Hull, starring Jake Sharp as Dewey, and concluded on 30 July 2022 at the Lyceum Theatre, Sheffield.

=== Argentina (2024) ===
In Argentina, the show was scheduled to open in May 2020 at the Teatro Ópera, but it was suspended due to the COVID-19 pandemic and eventually cancelled in 2021. The only cast members that had been revealed before the cancellation were Miguel Granados as Dewey Finn and Julieta Nair Calvo as Rosalie Mullins. The production was later restarted and eventually premiered at the Teatro Gran Rex in June 2024, with Agustín "Soy Rada" Aristarán and Ángela Leiva starring as Dewey and Mullins respectively. The musical also features Santiago Otero Ramos as Ned, Sofía Pachano as Patty, and Germán Tripel as Theo, Dewey's former bandmate in No Vacancy.

=== Austria (2023) ===
The first German-language production of the show opened to standing ovations from the audience at the Landestheater Linz on September 9, 2023, starring Enrico Treuse as Dewey Finn and Alexandra-Yoana Alexandrova as Miss Mullins.

=== Japan (2023) ===
In Japan the show was scheduled to open in August 2020, but it was postponed due to the COVID-19 pandemic. The show finally opened on 17 August 2023 at the Brillia HALL, Tokyo, starring Takanori Nishikawa and Hayato Kakizawa as Dewey, and concluded on 1 October 2023 at the Shinkabukiza, Osaka.

=== Youth productions ===
Youth production rights were opened for applications before the show opening on Broadway. They have begun to pilot in select schools.

=== Poland (2024) ===
"School of Rock" has been announced to open in Poland in June 2024 in Teatr Rozrywki in Chorzów. Premiere occurred on June 6 and is directed by Jacek Mikołajczyk. The show casts Maciej Maciejewski and Jakub Wróblewski as Dewey, Wioletta Białk and Paulina Magaj-Szpak as Rosalie Mullins, Hubert Waljewski and Tomasz Wojtan as Ned. The children's cast was selected during open auditions.

=== Regional productions ===
School of Rock's professional regional premiere was at Tuacahn Amphitheatre on July 31, 2021. A rare theatrical licensing situation made it available to youth and school groups before Concord Theatricals released it for professional licensing.

== Principal roles and original cast ==
Character	Broadway	West End	US tour	Australian tour	Asia tour	UK and Ireland tour
Character	2015	2016	2017	2018	2019	2021
Dewey Finn	Alex Brightman	David Fynn	Rob Colletti	Brent Hill	Brent Hill	Jake Sharp
Rosalie Mullins	Sierra Boggess	Florence Andrews	Lexie Dorsett Sharp	Amy Lehpamer	Amy Lehpamer	Rebecca Lock
Ned Schneebly	Spencer Moses	Oliver Jackson	Matt Bittner	John O'Hara	John O'Hara	Matthew Rowland
Patty Di Marco	Mamie Parris	Preeya Kalidas	Emily Borromeo	Nadia Komazec	Nadia Komazec	Nadia Violet Johnson
Shonelle	Taylor Caldwell	Amelia Poggenpoel Jaydah Bell-Rickets Shoshana Ezequiel	Olivia Bucknor	Rachel Kipnis Ava Rose Houben-Carter Ashlyn Norman	Rachel Kipnis Ashlyn Norman	Kyla Robinson Eden Anthony Elisha Kerai
Katie	Evie Dolan	Lois Jenkins Sophia Pettit Selma Hansen	Theodora Silverman	Samantha Zhang Remy Grunden Tiana Mirra	Samantha Zhang Tiana Mirra	Chloe Marler Marikit Akiwumi Daisy Hanna Ivy Balcombe
James	Jersey Sullivan	Sonny Kirby Bradley Bissett Denzel Eboji	Tommy Ragen	Gabriel Ingram Zac El-Alo Lachlan Young	Gabriel Ingram	Hadlee Snow Darmani Eboji Devon Francis Riotafari Gardner
Sophie	Corinne Wilson	Lola Moxom Grace Schneider Mia Roberts	Gabriella Uhl	Lucia Schwerdt Maya Corbett Ruby Moore	Ruby Moore	Ophelia Parsons Jemima Newman Ava Masters Inez Danielak
Marcy	Carly Gendell	Natasha Raphael Leah Levman Madeleine Haynes	Chloe Anne Garcia	Kayla Muir Annie Jones Riya Mandrawa	Kayla Muir	Lily Rose Martin Elodie Salmon Paris Banyong
Mason	Ethan Khusidman	Ben Dawsom Lucas Chow Presley Charman	Carson Hodges	Elijah Slavinskis Oscar Mulcahy Sam Jones	Sam Jones	Caelan Wallington Alex Shotton Nesim Adnan
Freddy	Dante Melucci	Bailey Cassell Noah Key Jude Harper-Wrobel	Gilberto Moretti-Hamilton	Ethan Stephenson Kempton Maloney Bailey Landeg	Ethan Stephenson Kempton Maloney	Eva McGrath Emerson Sutton Thomas Harvey Isaac Forward
Tomika	Bobbi Mackenzie	Amma Ris Adithi Sujith Nicole Dube	Gianna Harris	Bella Mia-Bortolin Chihana Perera Riley Thomas	Bella Mia-Bortolin Riley Thomas	Jasmine Djazel Souparnika Nair Angel Lucero
Zack	Brandon Niederauer	Toby Lee Jake Slack Tom Abisgold	Phoenix Schuman	Ben Swissa Zane Blumeris Jayden Tatasciore	Zane Blumeris Jayden Tatasciore	Joseph Sheppard Harry Churchill Hanley Webb William Laborde
Billy	Luca Padovan	Jobe Hart Logan Walmsley Joshua Vaughan	John Michael Pitera Brandon Narvaezzi	Lenny Thomas Amon Prete Hudson Sharp	Amon Prete Hudson Sharp	Wilf Cooper Logan Matthews Alfie Morwood
Lawrence	Jared Parker	Giles Carden Oscar Francisco James Lawson	Theo Mitchell-Penner	Caleb Elbourne Orlando Schwerdt Heath Jelovic	Caleb Elbourne	Oliver Forde Angus McDougall David Gluhovsky Oliver Pearce
Summer	Isabella Russo	Isabelle Methven Lucy Simmonds Eva Trodd	Ava Briglia	Ava McInnes Stephanie Kipnis Maria Yvette Pugat	Stephanie Kipnis	Keira Laver Florrie May Wilkinson Saffia Layla
Madison/Matthew*	Shahadi Wright Joseph	Jacob Swann Zachary Dowlatshahi Harry Egerton	—N/a	—N/a	—N/a	—N/a

* The character Madison was changed to Matthew in the West End production, but as of Spring 2018, the role of Matthew was removed from the West End production.

=== Notable replacements ===
Broadway

- Dewey Finn: Eric Petersen, Justin Collette
- Rosalie Mullins: Jennifer Gambatese
- Patty Di Marco: Becky Gulsvig
- Sophia: Gabby Gutierrez

== Music ==
The musical features an original score composed by Andrew Lloyd Webber, with lyrics by Glenn Slater, sound design by Mick Potter and musical supervision by Ethan Popp, in addition to music from the 2003 film. It features around twelve original songs, with three taken from the original film.

"I'm Too Hot for You" reuses the melody of "I've Been in Love Too Long", a track originally written by Lloyd Webber, with lyricist Don Black, for Marti Webb's album Won't Change Places (1981). "Stick it to the Man" uses musical elements taken from Lloyd Webber's fusion album Variations (1978) (others of which are also used in other musical numbers and as the music for an onstage game of Guitar Hero).

=== Musical numbers ===
Act I

- "I'm Too Hot for You" – No Vacancy
- "When I Climb to the Top of Mount Rock" – Dewey
- "Horace Green Alma Mater" – Rosalie, students, and teachers
- "Here at Horace Green" – Rosalie
- "Here at Horace Green (Reprise)" – Rosalie †
- "Variation 7" – Dewey and Ned
- "Children of Rock" – Dewey and Ned
- "Mount Rock (Reprise)" – Patty †
- "Queen of the Night" – Rosalie
- "You're in the Band" – Dewey and students
- "You're in the Band (Reprise)" – Dewey and students †
- "If Only You Would Listen" – Zack, Billy, Freddy, Tomika, and students
- "In the End of Time" – Dewey
- "Faculty Quadrille" – Teachers
- "In the End of Time (Band Practice)" – Dewey and students †
- "Stick It to the Man" – Dewey and students
- "In the End of Time (The Audition)" – Dewey and students
- "Stick It to the Man (Reprise)" – Dewey and students †

Act II

- "Time to Play" – Summer and students
- "Amazing Grace" – Tomika †
- "Math Is a Wonderful Thing" – Dewey and students †
- "Where Did the Rock Go? (Intro)" — Dewey †
- "Where Did the Rock Go?" – Rosalie
- "School of Rock (Band Practice)" – Dewey and students †
- "Dewey's Confession" – Dewey, Rosalie, Patty, Ned, and parents
- "If Only You Would Listen (Reprise)" – Tomika and students
- "Stick it to the Man (Reprise)" - Dewey and students
- "I'm Too Hot for You (Competition)" – No Vacancy †
- "School of Rock" (Competition) – Dewey and students
- "Stick It to the Man (Competition Encore)" – Dewey and students
- "Finale" – Full Company

† Not included in the original Broadway cast recording

=== Cast album ===
School of Rock: The Musical (Original Cast Recording)

Soundtrack album cast recording by Various
- Released: 4 December 2015
- Length: 1:05:30
- Label: Warner Bros. Records

On September 14, 2015, it was announced that a cast album would be recorded, before the show's Broadway opening. The album consists of 20 tracks, including three bonus tracks and the song "Give Up Your Dreams" which was cut from the production during previews. Distributed by Warner Bros. Records, the original cast recording was released on December 4, 2015, prior to the show's Broadway opening on December 6, 2015. The songs "You're in the Band", "If Only You Would Listen" and "Stick It to the Man" were released as singles on Google Play Music.

No.	Title	Length
1.	"When I Climb to the Top of Mount Rock"	3.28
2.	"Horace Green Alma Mater"	2.47
3.	"Here at Horace Green"	2.04
4.	"Variation 7 / Children of Rock"	4.23
5.	"Give Up Your Dreams"	3.20
6.	"Queen of the Night"	1.59
7.	"You’re in the Band"	4.55
8.	"If Only You Would Listen"	3.12
9.	"In the End of Time (A Cappella Version)"	2.11
10.	"Faculty Quadrille"	2.24
11.	"Stick It to the Man"	3.12
12.	"Time to Play"	3.36
13.	"Where Did the Rock Go?"	4.15
14.	"Dewey's Confession"	1.40
15.	"Act 2, Scene 8: Dewey's Bedroom"	5.08
16.	"School of Rock (Teacher's Pet)"	4.17
17.	"Finale"	3.37
18.	"I'm Too Hot for You (Bonus Track)"	3.26
19.	"If Only You Would Listen (Bonus Track)"	3.35
20.	"In the End of Time (Rock Version Bonus Track)"	2.01

== Critical reception ==
Most reviews of School of Rock were positive. Many focused on the child performers. David Rooney, for The Hollywood Reporter, praised the young rockers, "the show knows full well that its prime asset is the cast of ridiculously talented kids, ranging in age from nine to 13. They supply a joyous blast of defiant analog vitality in a manufactured digital world." David Cote wrote for Time Out: New York, "We expect cute kids in uniform, a spastic Dewey and face-melting riffs—along with heart-tugging family stuff. It worked for the movie, and wow, does it work on Broadway ... For those about to love School of Rock: We salute you." Robert Kahn of WNBC television station in New York concurred, "The story doesn't particularly resonate for me, but I won't soon forget the feel-good vibe radiating off the talented young performers."

According to Rooney, "Boggess is lovely in the show's closest thing to a female lead". Brightman's performance was praised as well, with Cote writing, "the secret weapon and glue holding it all together is an insanely winning, supernova turn by Alex Brightman as Dewey". Matt Windman of AM: New York wrote, "Brightman comes off as a gentler version of Jack Black, though still loud and rambunctious and a genuine class clown". Chris Jones of the Chicago Tribune noted, "What matters most — and what makes this show work — is that Brightman clearly has developed, and can show us he has developed, an emotional bond with his band."

Cote noted, "You’d have to have zero sense of humor about pop to not enjoy Webber’s jaunty pastiche score, which sneaks elegant melodies in among the boilerplate stadium stompers." But Jones suggested, "the ever-savvy Andrew Lloyd Webber has kept himself and his ditties more in the background". Marilyn Stasio of Variety noted, "Having written songs for alley cats and toy trains, Webber has the ideal sensibility to relate to children whose freakish talents might make them seem a little bit … peculiar, in a world of average Joes." Kahn stated, though: "I don't imagine most of the big numbers here will enjoy an afterlife; they're inferior to his earlier confections."

School of Rock evoked comparisons with other musicals, with Michael Dale of Broadway World deeming it "The Sound of Music without the Nazis". Rooney suggested that Lloyd Webber was "revisiting his Jesus Christ Superstar rock roots". According to Cote, "School of Rock has absorbed the diverse lessons of Rent, Spring Awakening and Matilda and passes them on to a new generation."

Jack Black himself attended a Sunday performance, and afterwards told the cast backstage, "There were so many times I went, ‘I could not have done it that well.’ You made me laugh. You made me cry. You made me rock.’"

== Awards and honors ==
=== Original Broadway production ===
Year	Award Ceremony	Category	Nominee	Result
2016	Tony Awards	Best Musical		Nominated
2016	Tony Awards	Best Book of a Musical	Julian Fellowes	Nominated
2016	Tony Awards	Best Original Score	Andrew Lloyd Webber and Glenn Slater	Nominated
2016	Tony Awards	Best Actor in a Musical	Alex Brightman	Nominated
2016	Drama Desk Award	Outstanding Musical		Nominated
2016	Drama Desk Award	Outstanding Music	Andrew Lloyd Webber	Nominated
2016	Drama Desk Award	Outstanding Orchestrations	Andrew Lloyd Webber	Nominated
2016	Drama Desk Award	Outstanding Lyrics	Glenn Slater	Nominated
2016	Drama Desk Award	Outstanding Sound Design in a Musical	Mick Potter	Nominated
2016	Outer Critics Circle Award	Outstanding Actor in a Musical	Alex Brightman	Nominated
2016	Drama League Award	Outstanding Production of a Musical		Nominated
2016	Drama League Award	Distinguished Performance	Alex Brightman	Nominated

=== Original West End production ===
Year	Award Ceremony	Category	Nominee	Result
2017	Laurence Olivier Awards	Best New Musical		Nominated
2017	Laurence Olivier Awards	Best Actor in a Musical	David Fynn	Nominated
2017	Laurence Olivier Awards	Outstanding Achievement in Music	Three children's bands who play music live every night	Won

=== Original Australian production ===
Year	Award Ceremony	Category	Nominee	Result
2019	Green Room Awards	Best Musical		Nominated
2019	Green Room Awards	Best Male Lead in a Musical	Brent Hill	Won
2019	Green Room Awards	Best Sound Design in a Musical	Mick Potter	Won
2019	Helpmann Awards	Best Male Actor in a Musical	Brent Hill	Won
