= Black Ops (TV series) =

British television comedy series

- Genre: Comedy
- Created by: Gbemisola Ikumelo; Akemnji Ndifornyen; Joe Tucker; Lloyd Woolf
- Written by: Joe Tucker; Lloyd Woolf; Gbemisola Ikumelo; Akemnji Ndifornyen; Racheal Ofori; Patricia Elcock; Thara Popoola; Christine Robertson
- Directed by: Ben Gregor; Akaash Meeda
- Starring: Gbemisola Ikumelo; Hammed Animashaun; Akemnji Ndifornyen
- Composers: Tawiah; Lindsay Wright
- Country of origin: United Kingdom
- Original language: English
- No. of series: 2
- No. of episodes: 12

Production
- Executive producers: Gbemisola Ikumelo; Akemnji Ndifornyen; Josh Cole; Joe Tucker; Lloyd Woolf
- Producers: Carol Harding; Kim Crowther
- Cinematography: Luke Palmer; Scott Coulter
- Editors: Mark Williams; Sabine Smith
- Production companies: BBC Studios; Mondo Deluxe

Original release
- Network: BBC One
- Release: 5 May 2023 – present

Black Ops is a British television comedy series made for BBC One starring Hammed Animashaun, Gbemisola Ikumelo and Akemnji Ndifornyen, the latter two also being co-creators, writers and executive producers. The first series aired in May 2023. A second series was commissioned in August 2023; which premiered on 8 January 2026. In May 2026, Black Ops was renewed for a third series.

== Synopsis ==
In East London, Dom and Kay are two police community support officers who join the Greater London Police and find themselves working undercover.

== Cast and characters ==
- Gbemisola Ikumelo as Dom
- Hammed Animashaun as Kay
- Akemnji Ndifornyen as Tevin
- Ariyon Bakare as Detective Inspector Clinton Blair
- Felicity Montagu as Superintendent Edwards
- Colin Hoult as Officer Price
- Robbie Gee as Morris
- Jo Martin as Julie
- Karlina Grace-Paseda as Elder Bunmi
- Jaz Hutchins as Breeze
- Joanna Scanlan as Chief Inspector Garner
- Rufus Jones as Inspector Scholes
- Emma Sidi as Marsh Ranger
- Marek Larwood as Police Officer
- Zoe Wanamaker as Celia Herrington
- Alex MacQueen as Marcus
- Katherine Kelly as Kirsty
- Lucy Thackeray as Linda

== Episodes ==
=== Series 1 (2023) ===
No. overall	No. in series	Title	Directed by	Written by	Original release date
1	1	"Episode 1"	Ben Gregor	Joe Tucker and Lloyd Woolf	5 May 2023
Police Community Support Officers Dominique and Kayodi find themselves recruited by Detective Inspector Clinton Blair to go undercover and infiltrate a gang dealing drugs on the Brightmarsh estate. To create a plausible cover story they get themselves fired and steal drugs the police have earmarked for incineration to resell on the estate. Having encroached on the gang's turf they are soon noticed and find themselves forcibly recruited by the gang. When tasked with burying a dead body they are shocked to find it is DI Blair.
2	2	"Episode 2"	Ben Gregor	Gbemisola Ikumelo and Akemnji Ndifornyen	12 May 2023
Fearing their cover is blown, the duo start to dig, however they realise that DI Blair may have communicated the undercover operation to someone he trusted. They decide to remove the deceased's finger to unlock and search his mobile phone. Having ascertained his home address, they break in and find a dossier, but before they have a chance to leave, another uninvited visitor also gains entry. It is none other than Superintendent Edwards.
3	3	"Episode 3"	Ben Gregor	Joe Tucker and Lloyd Woolf	19 May 2023
The freshly dug grave is discovered by a group of schoolchildren. The duo come to the conclusion that the police are turning a blind eye to drug dealing on the estate. After being robbed of their drugs and with no chance of meeting the sales target the Brightmarsh estate gang have set them, Dom and Kay, resort to robbing the youth pastor's church fund. Dom realises that the messages on DI Blair's phone from Kirsty make her the most likely to be his trusted contact.
4	4	"Episode 4"	Ben Gregor	Racheal Ofori	26 May 2023
Dom and Kay meet Kirsty and break the news of Clinton Blair's death. Expecting help but finding none, they are led to believe that Kirsty was only a casual acquaintance of the dead officer. Superintendent Edwards announces the discovery of DI Blair's body to the press, adding that he had been under internal investigation by the anti-corruption unit. Dom and Kay break into Superintendent Edwards' office and search her diary for clues. They follow her to a nursing home where she visits an elderly lady, presumably her mother.
5	5	"Episode 5"	Ben Gregor	Joe Tucker and Lloyd Woolf	2 June 2023
Realising that the elderly lady was not Superintendent Edwards' mother, Dom and Kay decide to investigate further by volunteering at the care home. They discover the name of the lady as Celia Herrington and attempt to bug a conversation between her and Superintendent Edwards but fail to catch the part where Superintendent Edwards admits to involvement in the death of DI Blair and that she now wants out. Celia Herrington receives another visitor later who turns out to work for the Ministry of Defence.
6	6	"Episode 6"	Ben Gregor	Joe Tucker and Lloyd Woolf	9 June 2023
Superintendent Edwards is assassinated by a bogus delivery man and Dom and Kay are followed by the same group who attempt to eliminate them too. After the failed attempt on their lives, Celia Herrington contacts Dom and suggests a meeting with a view to making a trade for the dossier. At the meeting, Kay secures a confession from Celia and her Ministry of Defence contact whilst secretly recording it. With the dossier and recording in the safe hands of Kirsty, the truth is finally revealed and the Brightmarsh gang arrested. DI Blair's name is cleared and the duo find themselves reinstated as PCSOs.

=== Series 2 (2026) ===
No. overall	No. in series	Title	Directed by	Written by	Original release date
7	1	"Episode 1"	Akaash Meeda	Joe Tucker and Lloyd Woolf	8 January 2026
Dom and Kay are now working at MI5, but each struggles to find their place: Dom is disgruntled to be working in the archives department in the basement, while Kay doubts the value of the task he's been given, deciphering Drill lyrics at the behest of government ministers. On the promise of more exciting work, Dom takes a big gamble to impress a senior agent, which turns out to have been a calamitous mistake.
8	2	"Episode 2"	Akaash Meeda	Thara Popoola	15 January 2026
Dom persuades Kay that, together, they can fix the mess she's gotten them into before anyone finds out. Her situation worsens when Brightmarsh Gang member Tevin returns from hiding to threaten her, to which Kay suggests a simple but risky solution.
9	3	"Episode 3"	Akaash Meeda	Racheal Ofori	22 January 2026
Dom's situation with Tevin significantly worsens as he piles the pressure on her to get his criminal record wiped. Meanwhile, Dom persuades an increasingly reluctant Kay to follow the lead they've uncovered to track down the mysterious 'Steve', which seems to lead them to a dead end. As the net starts closing on them, Kay gives Dom an ultimatum to come clean about her error – which she agrees to do, with a crucial caveat.
10	4	"Episode 4"	Akaash Meeda	Christine Robertson	29 January 2026
In order to prove Dom wasn't working with him as a double agent, Dom and Kay attempt to ambush Steve – by breaking into his flat while he's out and waiting for him to return. The plan quickly goes awry and Kay’s loyalty is pushed to breaking point.
11	5	"Episode 5"	Akaash Meeda	Patricia Elcock	5 February 2026
Following questioning which establishes a case of 'ineptitude', Dom and Kay are dismissed by MI5, with Dom being humiliated by senior agent, Joanna Fisher, for being taken in by nothing more than a chancer. With nothing to keep them together as agents, Dom and Kay decide to go their separate ways. However, when clues start to emerge that suggest there may indeed be a serious threat to the Notting Hill Carnival, the pair reunite.
12	6	"Episode 6"	Akaash Meeda	Joe Tucker and Lloyd Woolf	12 February 2026
Following their firing from MI5, Dom and Kay race against time to stop a major terror plot from unfolding at the Notting Hill Carnival. They try to track down Steve, but an unexpected and powerful new enemy, looking to cover up their involvement in this plot, is aiming to track down Dom & Kay.

== Production ==
In August 2021 the BBC confirmed that the six-part comedy thriller series would be produced by BBC Studios and Mondo Deluxe for BBC One and BBC iPlayer. The creators were announced as Gbemisola Ikumelo, Akemnji Ndifornyen, Joe Tucker, and Lloyd Woolf; the show was commissioned by Tanya Qureshi with Akemnji Ndifornyen as producer and Josh Cole as executive producer. The series is directed by Ben Gregor.

Said to be both a comedy and a thriller, Ikuelmo told Deadline Hollywood that "I love that the lines have become so muddied. When it's dark, it's really dark and when it's comedic, it's really funny, and I love mixing the two and bending genres."

In August 2023, it was commissioned for a second series and its filming started in February 2025. In May 2026, the BBC announced that a third series had been commissioned, with filming set to take place across Manchester and the North West.

=== Casting ===
Hammed Animashaun, Gbemisola Ikumelo and Akemnji Ndifornyen lead the cast of the series. The cast of the first series also included Ariyon Bakare, Joanna Scanlan, Robbie Gee, Jo Martin, and Felicity Montagu. For the second series, BBC announced Tom Stourton, Nigel Havers, Annette Badland, Ed Speleers and Cathy Tyson as guests. The third series had Alex Jennings and Denise Black join the cast with guest roles for CJ Beckford, Al Nash and Neil Bell.

=== Filming ===
Filming began in June 2022 in Luton. Filming also took place in Thamesmead and in Waltham Forest. Filming on the second series took place on location in Wigan and Manchester in February 2025. Filming on the third series was completed by October 2026 and took place in Manchester and the North West.

=== Music ===
Music for the show was completed by Lindsay Wright and Tawiah.

== Broadcast ==
Black Ops debuted in the UK on BBC One on 5 May 2023 at 9:30 pm, with episodes airing weekly and being available immediately on BBC iPlayer.

On February 25, 2025, all six episodes of series 1 became available in the United States on Hulu.

== Reception ==
=== Critical reception ===
Opinions about the first series were favourable overall despite many reviewers' initial reservations about finding humour in police racism and gang violence. The highest acclaim came from Rachel Aroesti of The Guardian, who gave the show five stars, calling it a "pitch-perfect, star-packed joy" that "merges broad comedy with bent copper crime drama to hilarious and nail-biting effect". Benji Wilson of the Daily Telegraph awarded the show four stars and stated the series "gets it all rather joyously right" with "a terrific pairing" in the lead roles who "ace it". Vicky Jessop writing for The Evening Standard gave Black Ops a three-star review, opining that the "campy, farcical tone works in some areas [but not] in others" but "you can forgive it almost anything because, for the most part, this show is funny" and "there are more than enough gags to compensate". Three-star reviews were also awarded by Nick Hilton of The Independent and Dan Einav of the Financial Times, the former stating that "despite a clever title" the "police sitcom is charming enough, but it lacks bite." Deborah Ross in The Mail on Sunday described the series as "terrific, a joy, fresh, wonderfully funny and inventive".

Series 2 received positive reviews. It was described by The Guardian as "likably silly", "hugely fun" and "a perfect balance between espionage and hilarity" noting that "the offbeat gags come thick and fast". The Observer described it as "winningly playful" while The Standard said "there’s more going on in this whip-smart series than just good gags... The fast-paced plot, matched by quick-witted writing, means the show has lost none of its edge, and continues to offer refreshing takes on dark topics like power, society and surveillance." Radio Times said the series was "fast-paced fun that feels like it has matured from the scrappy first series into something more confident". The i Paper described the show as "one of the funniest and sharpest new sitcoms in recent years".

== Accolades ==
Tawiah & Lindsay Wright were nominated in the Best Music Original Score - Scripted category at the 2023 Royal Television Society Craft & Design Awards. In February 2024, the series won at the Broadcast Awards in the Best Comedy Programme category.

The series received four nominations at the Royal Television Society Programme Awards in March 2024. Joe Tucker, Lloyd Woolf, Gbemisola Ikumelo and Akemnji Ndifornyen for Best Comedy Writing, as well as the series being nominated for Best Scripted Comedy. The two lead actors were winners in the Best Comedy Performance categories.

In March 2024, Ikumelo won Best Female Comedy Performance at the 2024 British Academy Television Awards. Additionally, Animashaun was nominated for Male performance in a comedy programme.
