= Nightwalking =

- Opening titles
- Directed by: Daniel Cormack
- Written by: Ben Clover
- Produced by: Daniel Cormack
- Starring: Raquel Cassidy; Lloyd Woolf
- Cinematography: Sam Osborne
- Edited by: Ian Grech
- Music by: Andy Simms
- Production company: Actaeon Films
- Distributed by: Network Ireland Television
- Release date: 15 February 2008 (X'08 International Disability Film Festival)
- Running time: 3 minutes
- Country: United Kingdom
- Language: English

Nightwalking (also known as Night Walking) is a 2008 British comedy horror short film directed by Daniel Cormack, starring Raquel Cassidy and Lloyd Woolf.

In 2010, Nightwalking was selected for preservation by the British Film Institute's National Archive and was archived by the British Universities Film and Video Council as part of their Television and Radio Index for Learning and Teaching (TRILT). In 2012, the film was acquired by the British Library's Moving Image Collection.

== Plot ==
Returning from a night out, Martha hears footsteps behind her and becomes convinced she's being followed as she walks down a dark path on her way home. She ponders various strategies such as pretending to do up her shoes in order to let her follower overtake her or simply running away, but dismisses each idea as endangering her even more. Eventually she screws up her courage to turn around and confront the man behind her, but when she does so she sees nothing except a mobile phone glowing on the ground as it calls somebody. James, her follower, has actually been going out of his way to avoid the impression he is following her or is a threat, but every time he does so it somehow backfires. He tries speeding up to overtake her, but this only makes Martha walk faster. He ponders taking a different route, but there are no turnings off the path they are walking down. Eventually he decides to make a "loud non-threatening phone call" to his mum, reasoning that: "I bet rapists never call their mums." However, as he is distracted with finding her number in his phone, he fails to notice a manhole in the ground and falls head over heels into it, his phone flying to the ground near Martha's feet.

== Cast ==
- Rachel Cassidy as Martha
- Lloyd Woolf as James

== Release ==
Nightwalking was originally released online as part of the inaugural Virgin Media Shorts Competition in 2008. It quickly became the most viewed film attracting over 12,300 views and hundreds of comments. The judges initially shortlisted the film for the Grand Prize. However, when the film came to be classified by the British Board of Film Classification it was given a 12a certificate, thus disqualifying it from the competition, which required that the 12 shortlisted films were certified as a PG or U.

=== Festivals ===
Edition	Festival	Programme Title	Venue	Date	Time	Country	Première Status
8th	X'08 International Disability Film Festival	Director's Showcase: Daniel Cormack	BFI Southbank, Studio	15 February 2008	15:50	UK	World
2nd	Shooting People Split Focus at the BFI	Split Focus: Daniel Cormack / Kara Miller	BFI Southbank, Studio	10 March 2008	18:00	UK	
1st	Wimbledon Shorts Film Festival	Wimbledon Shorts Film Competition	Polka Theatre, Main Theatre	7 June 2008	18:30	UK	
7th	Shot by the Sea: Hastings Film Festival	Festival Launch; Prior to Persepolis; Prior to Persepolis	Electric Palace Cinema	25 August 2008 28 August 2008 29 August 2008	20:00; 20:00; 20:00	UK	
2nd	Canary Wharf Film Festival	Short Film UK	Museum in Docklands; East Wintergarden, Canary Wharf; Cineworld West India Quay, Screen 7 Cineworld West India Quay, Screen 7	28 August 2008 29 August 2008 30 August 2008 31 August 2008	14:45; 20:15; 14:40; 18:25	UK	
7th	Cornwall Film Festival	Another Country International Short Film Award	Dewhelens Festival, Looe; Lewannick Village Hall; Wesleyan Chapel St Mary's Isles of Scilly; The Aggie Film Club; Wooda Farm, Carckington Haven; Downderry Film Kitchen; Tate St Ives; Bude Castle; Princess Pavilion, Theatre, Falmouth	2 September 2008 5 September 2008 7 September 2008 23 September 2008 25 September 2008 26 September 2008 26 September 2008 14 October 2008 8 November 2008	19:00; 19:30; 14:00; 19:30; 19:00; 19:30; 20:00; 19:30; 13:00	UK	
13th	Portobello Film Festival	London Filmmakers Convention - Day 2	Paradise Bar, Private Dining Room	3 September 2008	18:00	UK	
3rd	Compass of Mystery Festival	Five Minutes of Mystery	Mivart Street Studios; Studio 1	4 October 2008	16:00	UK	
1st	Hello Digital Film Festival	Prior to the feature presentation of 28 Days Later	Electric Cinema, Birmingham	28 September 2008	17:00	UK	
9th	Filmstock International Film Festival	Short Film Weekend 02	The Hat Factory, Screen One; The Hat Factory, Basement	7 November 2008 8 November 2008	21:00; 10:10	UK	
12th	CAN Leicester Film Festival	Day 2	Phoenix Arts Centre; Cinema	8 November 2009	19:00	UK	
6th	The End of the Pier International Film Festival	Comedy Drama Shorts	Regis Centre, Alexandra Theatre	1 May 2009	18:00	UK	
9th	Nickel Independent Film Festival	Shorts	Memorial University of Newfoundland, INCO Innovation Centre	26 June 2009	19:30	Canada	Canadian
3rd	Limelight Film & Arts Awards	Best Comedy category	Troxy, Main Auditorium	8 July 2010	18:30	UK	
4th	Rob Knox Film Festival	Festival	New Generation Church; Erith Rowing Club; Cineworld Bexleyheath	31 May 2011 5 June 2011 8 June 2011	19:00; 10:00; 18:00	UK	
2nd	Twickenham Alive Film Festival	Festival	Live Room, Twickenham Stadium; Edmund Kean Theatre, Richmond Upon Thames College	26 April 2013 1 May 2013	19:00; 16:00	UK	

=== Broadcast ===
In 2010, Nightwalking was broadcast on Channel 4 as part of "a series of short original films produced by a variety of talented writers and directors"; the first time in over 8 years that Channel 4 had acquired and broadcast independent short films.

== Reception ==
=== Accolades ===
Rank	Award	Awarding Body	Nominee	Year
Winner	Best Merton Filmmaker Award	Wimbledon Shorts Film Competition	Daniel Cormack	2008
Nominated	Short Film UK Award	Canary Wharf Film Festival	Daniel Cormack	2008
Nominated	Another Country International Short Film Award	Cornwall Film Festival	Daniel Cormack	2008
Nominated	Five Minutes of Mystery - Best Film Award	Compass of Mystery Film Festival	Daniel Cormack	2008
Nominated	Golden Monkey Award	CAN Leicester Film Festival	Daniel Cormack	2008
Nominated	Best Comedy Award	Limelight Film & Arts Awards	Daniel Cormack	2010
Special Mention	National Drama Award	Twickenham Alive Film Festival	Daniel Cormack	2013
Shortlisted (Disqualified)	Virgin Media Shorts Award	Virgin Media	Daniel Cormack	2008

== See also ==
- Amelia and Michael
- A Fitting Tribute
- Make Me a Tory
