= Hammed Animashaun =

English actor (born 1991)

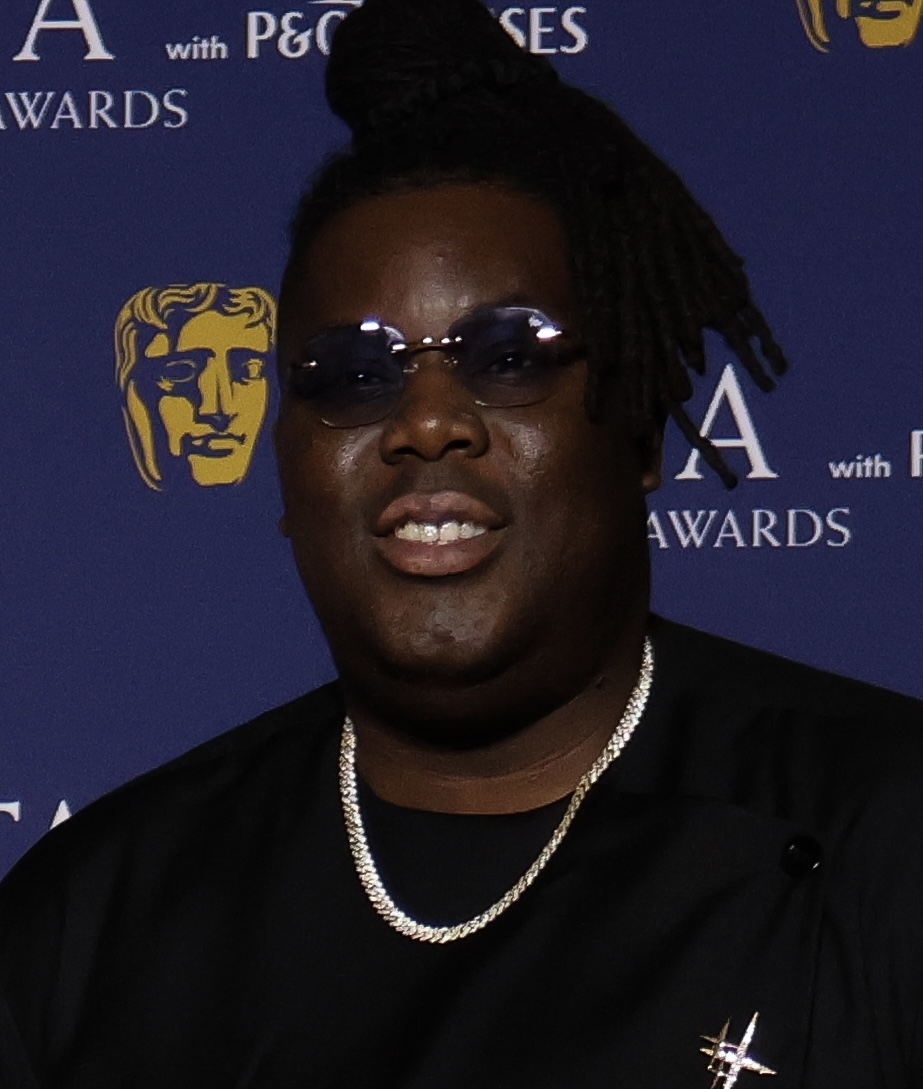
- Animashaun at the 2026 BAFTA TV Awards
- Born: 6 May 1991 (age 35); Whitechapel, London, England
- Occupations: Actor, writer
- Years active: 2011–present
- Known for: Black Ops; The Wheel of Time; SNL UK

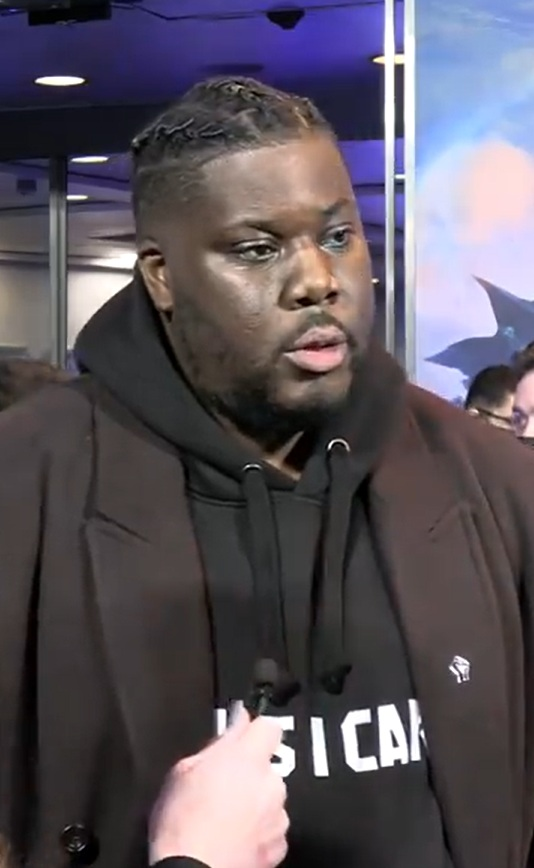
Animashaun at The Wheel of Time London Premiere 2021

Hammed Animashaun (born 6 May 1991) is a British actor and writer. He is best known for his roles as Kay in the BBC One comedy Black Ops (2023–present), Loial in Prime Video's fantasy series The Wheel of Time (2021–2025), and as one of the main cast members in the Sky One sketch comedy series Saturday Night Live UK (2026–present). For Black Ops, he won Best Male Comedy Performance at the 2024 Royal Television Society Programme Awards.

== Early life ==
Animashaun was born to Nigerian parents of Yoruba origin in Whitechapel, London. His father was a bus driver and his mother a voluntary worker. Hammed Animashaun is 1m 91 cm (6 ft 3 in). He had a growth spurt in college and one summer grew five inches. His younger brother is 2m 6 cm (6 ft 9 in). He was encouraged by his school drama teacher to join the Half Moon Children's Theatre in Limehouse. He studied philosophy with drama at university but dropped out when offered theatre roles.

== Career ==
=== Stage ===
He received second prize in the 2021 Ian Charleson Awards which recognise actors under the age of 30 in classical roles, for his role as Bottom in A Midsummer Night's Dream at the Bridge Theatre. He also won Best Supporting Actor at the WhatsOnStage Awards for the same production. Other stage roles have included "Master Harold"...and the Boys, Athol Fugard's drama set in apartheid South Africa, one of the Ugly Sisters in Cinderella at the Lyric Hammersmith, The Producers at the Manchester Royal Exchange, the original production of the Barber Shop Chronicles, Rufus Norris's staging of The Threepenny Opera at the National and Michael Longhurst's revival of Amadeus.

During 2024, Animashaun played a Gangster in a revival of Kiss Me, Kate, directed by Bartlett Sher at the Barbican Theatre, performing "Brush Up Your Shakespeare" alongside fellow Gangster Nigel Lindsay. Their performances were hailed as "hilarious Runyonesque theatre-enthusiast gangsters".

Animashaun was nominated for an Olivier Award for his performance in the 2025 revival of Dealer's Choice at the Donmar Warehouse.

=== Television ===
Animashaun appeared as Loial in the Amazon Prime Video series The Wheel of Time beginning in 2021. He stars in the 2023 BBC One comedy television series Black Ops, alongside Gbemisola Ikumelo and Akemnji Ndifornyen, playing an undercover policeman woefully out of his depth. His character, Kay, has been described as a "glass-half-full, God-fearing gentle giant and the opposite of street-smart." He described the role on the show as a "dream come true" and that he kept expecting to be replaced for a bigger named actor in the role. He has been praised for his chemistry with Ikumelo.

He won Best Male Comedy Performance at the 2024 Royal Television Society Programme Awards. In March 2024, Animashaun was nominated in the Male performance in a comedy programme category at the 2024 British Academy Television Awards.

In February 2026, Animashaun was announced as part of the Saturday Night Live UK cast. That year, he appeared in Channel 4 comedy series Break Clause.

=== Writing ===
In 2023, he was awarded one of two scripted creators in residence for BBC Studios TalentWorks to work with producers on scripted comedy and drama.

== Filmography ==
Year	Title	Role	Notes
2011	Affected	Affected Youth 3	Short film
2011	God View	Jalal	Short film
2011	Drift		Short film
2012	Twenty8k	Wayne	Feature film
2012	Borrowed Time	Leon	Feature film
2013	The Ellington Kid	Beefy	Short film
2016	Flowers	Ryan	3 episodes
2016	National Theatre Live: The Threepenny Opera	Jimmy 'Retail'	Filmed stage production
2017	National Theatre Live: Amadeus	Venticello	Filmed stage production
2017	Comedy Blaps	Prince	Episode: "Furious Andrew"
2017	Black Mirror	Pizza Guy	Episode: USS Callister
2017	The Festival	Shane	Feature film
2017–2018	Pls Like	Johnny Jackson	5 episodes
2018	National Theatre at Home: Barber Shop Chronicles	Wallace / Timothy / Mohammed / Tinashe	Filmed stage production
2019	How to Build a Girl	Ed Edwards	Feature film
2019	National Theatre Live: A Midsummer Night's Dream	Bottom	Filmed stage production
2019	National Theatre Live: "Master Harold"...and the Boys	Willie	Filmed stage production
2019	Cunk & Other Humans on 2019	Chiwetel Bacca	6 episodes
2020	Surge	Durab	Feature film
2020	Breeders	Binman #2	Episode: "No Sleep:
2020	Fireworks	B	Short film
2021–2025	The Wheel of Time	Loial	17 episodes
2022	The Loneliest Boy in the World	Elliot	Feature film
2023–present	Black Ops	Kay	Lead role
2024	Ludwig	Ross Barclay	1 episode
2024	Time Bandits	Mansa Musa	3 episodes
2024	Susan	Daniel of Mile End	Short film
2024	Kiss Me, Kate	Gangster	Filmed stage production
2024	Celebrity Mastermind	Himself–contestant	Winner, episode 5
2026	Saturday Night Live UK	Various	Main cast
2026	Death Valley	Warren Medwin	Series 2: Episode 1
2026	Break Clause	Paul	3 episodes
2026	The Baddies	Troll (voice)	Upcoming animated short story

== Accolades ==
Year	Award	Category	Work	Result	Ref.
2026	Laurence Olivier Awards	Best Actor in a Supporting Role	Dealer's Choice	Nominated	
