= Big Bad World (TV series) =

- Created by: Joe Tucker; Lloyd Woolf
- Written by: Joe Tucker; Lloyd Woolf; Rose Heiney; Kevin Cecil; Andy Riley; Jon Purkis
- Directed by: Sandy Johnson; Tristram Shapeero
- Starring: Blake Harrison; Rebecca Humphries; David Fynn; Seann Walsh; James Fleet; Caroline Quentin; Scarlett Alice Johnson
- Country of origin: United Kingdom
- Original language: English
- No. of series: 1
- No. of episodes: 8

Production
- Executive producers: Ben Farrell; Andrew Newman
- Producer: Kate Daughton
- Running time: 22 minutes approx
- Production company: Objective Productions

Original release
- Network: Comedy Central
- Release: 21 August – 9 October 2013

Big Bad World is a British television sitcom which first aired on Comedy Central in 2013. Created by Joe Tucker and Lloyd Woolf, it stars Blake Harrison as Ben, a directionless, young graduate who returns to his hometown of Great Yarmouth after leaving university.

== Cast ==
- Blake Harrison as Ben Turnbull
- Rebecca Humphries as Beth
- David Fynn as Oakley
- Seann Walsh as Eggman
- James Fleet as Neil Turnbull
- Caroline Quentin as Jan Turnbull
- Scarlett Alice Johnson as Lucy Deacon
- Alex Lanipekun as Steve
- Julia Deakin as Shirley
- Jay Brown as Dean

== Episodes ==
No.	Title	Directed by	Written by	Original release date
1	"Episode 1"	Sandy Johnson	Joe Tucker & Lloyd Woolf	21 August 2013
Ben returns home from university to find that his parents have knocked down the wall between their bedroom and his. He intends to find work abroad, but changes his plan when he bumps into his ex-girlfriend Lucy. He thinks he can win her back, despite finding out that she is in a relationship with a policeman, who proposes to her in the pub in front of him and his friends.
2	"Episode 2"	Sandy Johnson, Tristram Shapeero	Joe Tucker & Lloyd Woolf	28 August 2013
Ben starts an unpaid graduate internship at his local pub and attempts to prove Lucy's love for him.
3	"Episode 3"	Sandy Johnson	Joe Tucker, Lloyd Woolf & Jon Purkis	4 September 2013
Oakley attempts to celebrate his birthday with a day of carefully scheduled activities. However, his friends various preoccupations make this an increasingly difficult endeavour.
4	"Episode 4"	Sandy Johnson	Joe Tucker & Lloyd Woolf	11 September 2013
Ben takes a stand against pub chef Dean over his frequent dry-humping of him, leading to Ben being falsely accused of sexual harassment in the workplace and having to attend a one-day course about it. A rumour spreads that Ben is gay. Beth improves her chugging performance by flirting with and giving fake phone numbers to new male donors. When one of them men tells her that the number does not exist, she gets a new SIM card in order to have a number to give the men. A mix-up results in her unintentionally telling all the men that she is in the pub, leading to several of them turning up there at the same time. Ben hides her in the walk-in fridge.
5	"Episode 5"	Sandy Johnson	Rose Heiney	18 September 2013
Beth starts seeing an environmental activist called Sandy and Ben bets her that they will break up within the week. Meanwhile, Eggman suffers a life crisis and Oakley tries to rebuild him in his own image.
6	"Episode 6"	Sandy Johnson	Kevin Cecil & Andy Riley	25 September 2013
To earn some extra cash, Ben volunteers for medical testing. Oakley introduces the gang to his new girlfriend - "Aunty" Pat - and Eggman is keen to impress local music journalist, J.J. Savage.
7	"Episode 7"	Sandy Johnson	Rose Heiney	2 October 2013
Ben angles for a promotion at the pub and is given the task of managing a bring-and-buy sale. But the local crowd prove less than ready for his bohemian vision of a pop-up market.
8	"Episode 8"	Sandy Johnson	Joe Tucker & Lloyd Woolf	9 October 2013
Beth wins 'Chugger of the Year' and invites Ben to the award ceremony in glittering Norwich. However, Ben is in a bind when he finally manages to win a date with Lucy on the same night.

== Reception ==
The show received a generally positive critical reaction with some mixed reviews. The Guardian praised the series as "a surprisingly engaging original series from Comedy Central UK" and "a funny take on the challenges of adulthood". The Metro said of episode 1, "So far, so promising. Harrison is adept at the whole man-child thing and he's surrounded by a convincing bunch of slacker, lives-going-nowhere mates, for whom a trip to Chelmsford is the height of excitement” and later praised the show as "a clever and funny insight into graduate life".

Criticising the show as being "marred by some unnecessarily post-Partridge moments", the Radio Times nevertheless said, "Big Bad World sparks into life when it stops trying too hard and forges its own path. Ben and Beth are easy to warm to, while Scarlett Johnson expertly cuts a diabolically fluffy figure as femme fatale Lucy." DIY magazine praised the opening episode's "innate watchability", commenting that "Making us care for characters is no mean feat and creators Joe Tucker and Lloyd Woolf seem to have a plan to make us fall for Ben and his merry band of men and women. A few more episodes in to allow for everyone to settle in and it's fair to say that the future is promising for Big Bad World."
