= Famalam =

British sketch comedy show

- Genre: Sketch comedy
- Country of origin: United Kingdom
- No. of series: 3

Production
- Production company: BBC Studios

Original release
- Network: BBC Three
- Release: September 2017

Famalam is a British sketch show starring primarily black British comedians. The pilot first aired in September 2017, with the first series starting in April 2018. A second and third series were then released in late March 2019 and August 2020 respectively. Creator of the series, Akemnji Ndifornyen said Famalam was inspired by the "good weird" performances by Leigh Francis in Bo' Selecta!

== Cast ==
- Gbemisola Ikumelo
- Samson Kayo
- John Macmillan
- Akemnji Ndifornyen
- Vivienne Acheampong
- Tom Moutchi
- Danielle Vitalis

== Sketches ==
- Fantastic Egusi – a spoof of low-budget Nollywood films from Nigeria.
- Midsomer Motherfuckin' Murders – a spoof of rural-set British detective programme Midsomer Murders, but with Moses Mountree, a parody of 1970s American Blaxploitation detectives.
- Scribbler P – a garage MC whose tracks are about Black history.
- Professor Lofuko – a witch doctor in Croydon.

== Reception ==
The show was described as "a sublime achievement of satire" by Sean O'Grady of The Independent, who likened it to The Fast Show, Little Britain and 1990s sketch show Goodness Gracious Me, the last of which had a primarily British Asian cast and themes. Hannah J. Davies of Refinery29 praised the series for the variety in its humour, as well as the perspectives from its 50% female cast.

In August 2020, the show and the BBC were criticised for a sketch involving a Jamaican version of Countdown. Historian Paul Gilroy of University College London and the Global Jamaica Diaspora Council criticised the sketch for perpetuating stereotypes of Jamaicans as hypersexual, simple minded and drug-using. The BBC and Famalam actor Tom Moutchi defended the show as an exploration of stereotypes from a black perspective.

== Nominations ==
Samson Kayo was nominated for Best Male Comedy Performance at the 2018 British Academy Television Awards, while Gbemisola Ikumelo was nominated in the female equivalent in 2020 and 2021. At the Royal Television Society Awards, the series was nominated for Scripted Comedy and Kayo was nominated for Comedy Performance: Male in 2019. In 2021, Ikumelo won the award for Comedy Performance: Female.
