= Witless (TV series) =

British television series

- Genre: Comedy; Thriller
- Created by: Lloyd Woolf, Joe Tucker
- Written by: Lloyd Woolf, Joe Tucker
- Directed by: Andrew Chaplin
- Starring: Kerry Howard; Zoe Boyle
- Country of origin: United Kingdom
- Original language: English
- No. of series: 3
- No. of episodes: 15

Production
- Producer: Charlotte Lewis
- Running time: 25 minutes

Original release
- Network: BBC Three
- Release: 22 April 2016 – 10 January 2018

Witless is a British thriller sitcom created by Lloyd Woolf and Joe Tucker, produced by Objective Fiction, part of Objective Media Group, for the BBC. The first episode of the first series was released on 22 April 2016 on BBC Three, with a new episode weekly. A second series was commissioned prior to the series finale to air in early 2017, with the full series released on 25 January 2017. A third series was commissioned on 23 February 2017, in a statement co-star Kerry Howard said she was "beyond thrilled that Witless has a third series". The full third series was released on 10 January 2018. Before it was released Howard confirmed on her Twitter page that this would be the final series.

Two young women, Rhona and Leanne (played by Zoe Boyle and Kerry Howard), who share a flat in Bristol, are later placed in witness protection after witnessing a murder. They are given new identities and moved to a flat in Swindon where they find their very recent past coming back to haunt them whilst they attempt to blend in with their surroundings.

== Series overview ==
Season	Episodes	Originally aired		
Season	Episodes	First aired	Last aired	Network
1	5	22 April 2016	20 May 2016	BBC Three
2	5	27 January 2017		BBC Three
3	5	10 January 2018		BBC Three

== Cast ==
- Kerry Howard as Leanne
- Zoe Boyle as Rhona
- Samuel Anderson as Patrick
- Nicholas Fruin as Adrian "DJ Sound as Fuck"
- T'Nia Miller as DC Wilton
- Nick Preston as Benny
- Francis Magee as Willy Whelan (series 2–3)
- Tim Faraday as One Pack (series 2–3)
- Charlotte Eaton as Jackie (series 1–2)
- Tom Cawte as Appraisal (series 1, guest series 3)
- John Hodgkinson as Sergeant Tony Forrest (series 1)
- Samuel Oatley as Ian (series 1)
- John Inverdale as himself (series 1, guest series 2–3)

== Episodes ==
=== Series 1 (2016) ===
No. overall	No. in series	Directed by	Written by	Original release date
1	1	Andrew Chaplin	Joe Tucker & Lloyd Woolf	22 April 2016
Rhona Fairburn tells her flatmate Leanne Stubbs that she is buying a one-bedroom flat in Bedminster and moving out of the flat in Easton which they have been sharing for 2 years and 8 months. Before she can move, they witness a murder in the street. They go to the police station, where they are told that the police accidentally passed on their names to the defence lawyers. To prevent them being targeted, they are placed in witness protection and moved to a flat in Swindon. The police tell Rhona to use the name Sarah Penn and Leanne to use the name Lisa Smith. They are told that the killing is part of a gang feud connected to bootleg cigarettes. Leanne leaps at the chance to create an extravagant alter-ego, Mystique, whilst Rhona is determined to get back to her old life as soon as possible. Leanne's "acting" threatens to blow their cover by attracting attention. Rhona thinks she can solve their problems and approaches the gang in the street and suggests meeting them at a lapdancing club. Sarah arrives and the girls find out that there has been another murder in Bristol – that of their 76-year-old neighbour Mrs Gladys Hobbs, who was shot dead in her flat. The girls quickly leave the club when they realise that Rhona's plans will cause them to be shot. Leanne meets a young man called Patrick in the street, and the girls go to a party at his house. The girls leave after they see a photograph in his house which includes him and the perpetrator of the murder that they witnessed. After going back to their Swindon flat, Leanne realises that she left her bag at Patrick's.
2	2	Andrew Chaplin	Joe Tucker & Lloyd Woolf	29 April 2016
The girls need to get Leanne's bag back from Patrick's house. Leanne goes to Patrick's house, where he tells her that he deals in vintage teddy bears, then they have sex together. Rhona tells her that it is too dangerous to be involved with him. Sergeant Forrest is tricked into stripping, masturbating and singing on webcam by hitmen Appraisal and DJ Sound as Fuck, by pretending that they are an attractive young woman. The hitmen record him, and he is later shown the video on a phone by one of the gang, Ian, who confronts him in a toilet and blackmails him into sabotaging the investigation into the murders.
3	3	Andrew Chaplin	Joe Tucker & Lloyd Woolf	5 May 2016
The duo arouse the suspicions of their scary, ugly, nosy, middle-aged underclass neighbour Jackie. Rhona enlists Leanne's help to blend in on the estate and change her middle-class voice to be similar to those of the locals. Their attempts to win Jackie over backfire when Rhona's attempt at a local accent sounds ridiculous. They then pretend that Rhona has a speech problem due to being deaf. When that lie is exposed, they then pretend to be a lesbian couple. DJ Sound as Fuck makes a discovery that could lead him to the girls. Forrest is confronted by an unwanted houseguest, Ian, who wants to know where the girls now live.
4	4	Andrew Chaplin	Joe Tucker & Lloyd Woolf	13 May 2016
Patrick texts Leanne out of the blue almost two weeks after they last saw each other. Jackie pressures Rhona to buy a small cake from her for £2. Jackie overhears Leanne leaving a voicemail message for Patrick, stating that they had sex. Rhona is insistent that Leanne cuts all ties with him, but Leanne meets him. He asks her to look after one of his bears, which she does. Jackie comes to the flat and is angry at her for not having eaten the cake. She tells Rhona that Leanne had sex with a man, and Jackie makes Rhona confront Leanne about her "cheating". Leanne tells Rhona that she is looking after one of Patrick's bears, which Rhona is horrified about and strongly suspects that there are drugs in the bear. Rhona finds a gun in the bear and thinks that it was used in the murder that they witnessed. Sergeant Forrest is being pressured by the gang to reveal the whereabouts of the girls, and plans to flee to Spain. The cat that hitman Gareth Pugh (known as Appraisal) stole from the old woman that they killed is discovered by his mother. The police are in Mrs Hobbs's flat when Mrs Pugh phones to say that he has her cat. Mrs Pugh is unaware that she is speaking to Detective Constable Wilton rather than Mrs Hobbs, and is also unaware that Mrs Hobbs has been murdered.
5	5	Andrew Chaplin	Joe Tucker & Lloyd Woolf	20 May 2016
Leanne and Rhona go to the local police station to hand the gun in, but forget to take it with them. Leanne remembers that she put in the washing machine. The girls retrieve the gun from the washing machine. They hear someone in the flat, so they hide in the bathroom and bolt the door. When someone tries to get into the bathroom, Rhona fires a bullet through the door. When they open the door, they find Jackie bleeding on the floor, having been shot. Forrest meets three members of the gang, including Ian, and gives their address to the girls. Ian stays with Forrest whilst they go the girls' flat. Forrest gets into his car, then slams the door on Ian's gun, making it fall to the floor. Ian picks up the gun and first at Forrest as he is driving towards him. Forrest repeatedly runs over Ian, killing him – then flees to the airport – where he phones the girls to tell them that the gang know their address. DC Wilton and another police officer go to Appraisal's house, and after informing Mrs Pugh of the murder, take them to the police station. Appraisal claims that he heard of the murder and took the cat. DC Wilton thinks that Appraisal is not telling the whole truth, and wants him put under surveillance. DJ Sound as Fuck tells Appraisal that he knows about the police's visit to his house – then he shoots Appraisal.

=== Series 2 (2017) ===
No. overall	No. in series	Directed by	Written by	Original release date
6	1	Andrew Chaplin	Joe Tucker & Lloyd Woolf	27 January 2017
The girls realise that Jackie is alive and phone for an ambulance, who take her and the girls away. Hitman Benny is waiting outside the flat, but leaves seconds after the ambulance arrives. DC Wilton thinks that the shooting of Jackie was a botched attempt to kill the girls. At the hospital, a policeman tells the girls to come with him to the police station. However, they are unable to trust the police, knowing that a police officer leaked their real identities to the defence, then an officer gave their Swindon address to the gang. The girls decide to go on the run, so Rhona knees the policeman in the groin, then the girls. They see Benny, so they go into a room, where they pretend to a patient that they are a doctor and nurse. A policewoman is informed that the girls have absconded, and phones Rhona; she tells the policewoman about the corrupt officer, and tells them that they are going it alone. The girls steal a patient's clothes and keys, then leave in disguise. The girls intend to stay at the patient's house, but when they arrive, see that a light is on. They enter the caravan which is on the house's drive. They go to sleep, and wake up to find that they are being towed on a motorway.
7	2	Andrew Chaplin	Joe Tucker & Lloyd Woolf	27 January 2017
Leanne and Rhona wake up to find themselves hurtling down the M4 motorway. When it stops at motorway services and the elderly man and woman in the car get out, the girls get out. When the girls see that the caravan is being driven away, they get into it. When the elderly man and woman enter the caravan, and start taking off their clothes to have sex, Rhona stops them. They tell the woman that they are her husband's nurses, and she admits that she is cheating on him. The man in the caravan says that he is the husband's friend. The gang meet, where their formidable head honcho, Willy Whelan, learns that Ian was killed. DJ Sound as Fuck earns a newfound respect from the gang for murdering Appraisal, much to the annoyance of Benny. They are all ordered to find the girls. Mrs Pugh phones Detective Wilton to report Appraisal missing. She is angry with her colleague for not having Appraisal put under surveillance as she wanted.
8	3	Andrew Chaplin	Joe Tucker & Lloyd Woolf	27 January 2017
Rhona and Leanne try to find out the truth about Patrick's criminal connections. Leanne has a positive result from a pregnancy test. They confront Patrick at his flat with his gun and ask him why he tricked them into taking the gun in the bear and ask him why he did not call Leanne. They tell him their real names, that they witnessed a murder in Bristol and that they are in witness protection. He tells them that he used to be in a gang. Leanne tells him that she is pregnant by him, and shows him the test. Rhona looks at the pregnancy test and its instructions. She realises that Leanne misread it, and that the test is actually negative. In Bristol, DJ Sound as Fuck phones Childline, telling them that he shot someone. They tell him to tell the police. DC Wilton asks DJ Sound as Fuck about Gareth and says that she knows that they are friends. He says that they only know each other slightly and that he does not know where he is or when he last saw him. He texts Appraisal's mother from Appraisal's mobile phone, pretending to be him and telling her that he is at a newsagent's – and the newsagent is bumming him. DJ Sound as Fuck deliberately drops the phone on the newsagent's floor. The police arrest the newsagent, a 68-year-old Asian man. Determined to uncover the identity of Charlie Little Pockets (whom he assumes is a gang member instead of a teddy bear), Benny visits Jackie in hospital. He tells her that the girls owe him money. She tells him that she does not believe him and that she knows that they are in witness protection. She tells him that she thinks that he is one of the gang who is pursuing him. She says that she will give him the name of the man whom Mystique is dating if she is paid £1,000.
9	4	Andrew Chaplin	Joe Tucker & Lloyd Woolf	27 January 2017
Rhona, Leanne and Patrick try to formulate a plan to get out of witness protection and back to their old lives. Patrick tells them that a gang member that he knew has died. Patrick is willing to go to extreme lengths to help them, and to concoct a believable story about how he lost the gun that gang boss Willy Whelan gave him. Patrick decides to pretend that men broke into his house, beat him up and took the gun from him. He goes into a pub and tries to preach Islam to a group of nationalist men, who beat him up. Benny suggests to Whelan to pay Jackie to tell them who Mystique's boyfriend is – assuming that it is Charlie Little Pockets, and that Charlie shot Jackie by mistake, while intending to shoot Benny. Whelan refuses to pay. Rhona tells Leanne that she misread the pregnancy test. The police continue to investigate into Appraisal's disappearance by viewing the texts on his phone. DJ Sound as Fuck phones the police from Whelan's pub The Badger to falsely claim that he saw Appraisal with an old Muslim man at the location where DJ Sound as Fuck hid Appraisal's corpse. The police go there and find the body, then trace the phone call. They find an image on Appraisal's phone of DJ Sound as Fuck holding a gun.
10	5	Andrew Chaplin	Joe Tucker & Lloyd Woolf	27 January 2017
Jackie tells Benny that she will tell him Mystique's boyfriend's name for £1,000. He gives her the money and she tells him that the boyfriend's name is Patrick. He demands the money back and pulls a gun on her. From behind, her sister hits him on the head, knocking him out. Posing as mourners, a disguised Leanne and Rhona infiltrate Ian's funeral, taking them to the heart of the gang and face to face with Whelan. Leanne puts on a Russian accent and pretends to be Ian's other woman, prompting a physical fight with his fiancée. Patrick recognises Leanne and she tells him that she is not pregnant, then she leaves. The newsagent has been released without charge. DJ Sound as Fuck collides with Leanne as they are both running along a street and he recognises her.

=== Series 3 (2018) ===
No. overall	No. in series	Directed by	Written by	Original release date
11	1	Andrew Chaplin	Joe Tucker & Lloyd Woolf	10 January 2018
Leanne and Rhona's attempt to frame nemesis Willy Whelan by planting Patrick's gun in his house fails. Rhona finds herself trapped in Willy Whelan's secret weapons room as his henchman One-Pack finds her. Rhona threatens him with the gun and she runs off with it. DJ Sound as Fuck runs off after colliding with Leanne. The girls meet and tell Wilton of the stash of weapons in Whelan's house. Rhona give Wilton the gun. Whelan has the guns removed before the police arrive. The gang find out that Patrick has been helping the girls, unaware that they are witnesses to a murder. Whelan tells Patrick about his relationship with Leanne. The girls anonymously give evidence in court with their voices disguised. The gunman in the first murder is convicted and imprisoned. The girls choose to be separated, but are told that they need to remain in witness protection.
12	2	Andrew Chaplin	Joe Tucker & Lloyd Woolf	10 January 2018
Leanne is flourishing in her new "wit pro" identity in Chippenham as estate agent of the month, Julie. But things are not as rosy for Rhona, who is a cowboy hatted waitress, Imogen, in a themed restaurant. A chance meeting – when Leanne is a customer in Rhona's restaurant – leads to an emotional reunion. Patrick sinks deeper into a life of crime – including burying a corpse with One-Pack – but a mysterious correspondent (whom he is unaware is Leanne) gives him a glimmer of hope. One-Pack, Whelan and Patrick see Leanne in a newspaper advertisement as Julie. A hitman for the gang shoots Leanne's colleague Trish whilst she is at Julie's desk. She is taken to hospital. Rhona and Leanne decide to try to have Whelan killed by his rival gang. DJ Sound as Fuck is not cut out for life with his unusual companions. A farmer walks in on his daughter Brigid showing him her bra, then demands that they marry.
13	3	Andrew Chaplin	Joe Tucker & Lloyd Woolf	10 January 2018
Leanne and Rhona turn super sleuths, tracking the father and brother of the first murder victim to a Bristol kebab shop. Disguised as good cop/bad cop, the girls put on a performance they hope will trick them into doing their dirty work – killing Willy Whelan. The father has quit his life of crime, but the brother says that he is intending to kill Whelan. The girls think they can isolate Whelan from his gang by staging a Tudor banquet, which they believe will appeal to Whelan's wife and that Whelan will accompany her. The brother agrees to the plan and to kill him there. DJ Sound as Fuck's marriage to Brigid is due to take place the following morning. Her father insists that DJ Sound as Fuck circumcise himself with scissors. He instead uses the scissors to stab her father in the leg, then runs off. DJ Sound as Fuck reaches a road, where the police apprehend him. Patrick's unlikely online friendship with Leanne takes a romantic turn.
14	4	Andrew Chaplin	Joe Tucker & Lloyd Woolf	10 January 2018
Leanne and Rhona need to lure Willy Whelan to their fake Tudor banquet, so that Baz can try to kill him "with hammers". An undercover escapade in a beauty salon convinces his wife to snap up the tickets. But there is a hitch – unbeknownst to them, some leaked information means their plan is riskier than they first thought. And after eavesdropping on a secret plot by Baz and his friends, Leanne starts to get cold feet. DJ Sound as Fuck faces up to his crimes.
15	5	Andrew Chaplin	Joe Tucker & Lloyd Woolf	10 January 2018
Ambushed by the gang, Rhona and Leanne are trapped as the building burns down around them. It looks as though Whelan has triumphed in this final stand-off. Meanwhile, with gang insiders dispatched to kill him, DJ Sound as Fuck is set to meet a grim fate in the juvenile detention centre. It is revealed that Patrick informed the police about everything to do with Wheelan's criminal network and plans. The police are already present at the building and instantly rescue Rhona, Leanne and Baz. All of Wheelan's illegal activities are discovered, Wheelan and his whole gang are arrested, and DJ Sound as Fuck is saved. Wheelan realises Patrick exposed him, and attempts to shoot him, but is shot dead by the police before he can. One Pack pleads guilty to all his crimes and Wheelan's whole network goes down. Patrick is put into witness protection, DJ Sound as Fuck reforms and starts revising for his GCSEs, Baz restarts his gang whilst Rhona and Leanne return home. Leanne finds Patrick in Greece and travels there to live with him, sending a photo to Rhona in Christmas to let her know she is fine.
