= Lloyd Woolf =

British comedy actor and writer (born 1981)

Lloyd Woolf (born 1981) is a British comedy actor and writer from Swansea, Wales.

== Personal life ==
Woolf was born in 1981 in Swansea, and grew up in the Swansea Valley town of Pontardawe. After graduating with an English degree from Cambridge University, Woolf moved to London. He now lives in Essex with his wife and children.

== Career ==
At university Woolf became involved in the Cambridge Footlights, performing alongside the likes of Ed Weeks, Dan Stevens, Sarah Solemani, Mark Watson, Matt Kirshen, Tim Key, Tom Basden and Stefan Golaszewski.

After graduating Woolf formed the sketch group Cowards with Key, Basden and Golaszewski. They performed at the Edinburgh Festival Fringe in 2005 and 2006. They produced two radio series for BBC Radio 4, broadcast in 2007 and 2008. They also produced a television series for BBC Four, which was broadcast in January 2009, to critical acclaim. It was nominated for a Scottish BAFTA.

As an actor Woolf also featured in the BBC Three sketch show The Wrong Door and the sitcom How Not to Live Your Life, as well as the short film Nightwalking. In theatre, Woolf appeared in Captain Oates' Left Sock at the Finborough Theatre and The Roman Bath at the Arcola Theatre. He appeared briefly in Richard Ayoade's feature film The Double opposite Jesse Eisenberg. He has also featured in numerous TV adverts, including Pot Noodle's infamous Welsh miners parody.

Woolf was a writer on Black Ops.

Woolf has also performed extensively as a stand-up, including a solo show at the 2008 Edinburgh Fringe.

=== Partnership with Joe Tucker ===
Woolf has formed a successful writing partnership with Joe Tucker.

In 2012, Woolf and Tucker co-wrote the Sky One sitcom Parents starring Sally Phillips and Tom Conti. Woolf also featured in the show as Dr. Blair.

Their second sitcom, Big Bad World starring Blake Harrison, was broadcast on Comedy Central (UK and Irish TV channel) in 2013.

Woolf and Tucker created and wrote the comedy thriller Witless, starring Kerry Howard and Zoe Boyle, for BBC Three (online). The show ran for three series between 2016 and 2018, and was nominated for the Rose d'Or. Again, Woolf appeared in the show as PC Ferns.

Woolf and Tucker wrote and created Click & Collect starring Stephen Merchant and Asim Chaudhry, a one-off Christmas Special for BBC One. It was broadcast on Christmas Eve 2018.
