= Akemnji Ndifornyen =

British actor, writer, composer and producer

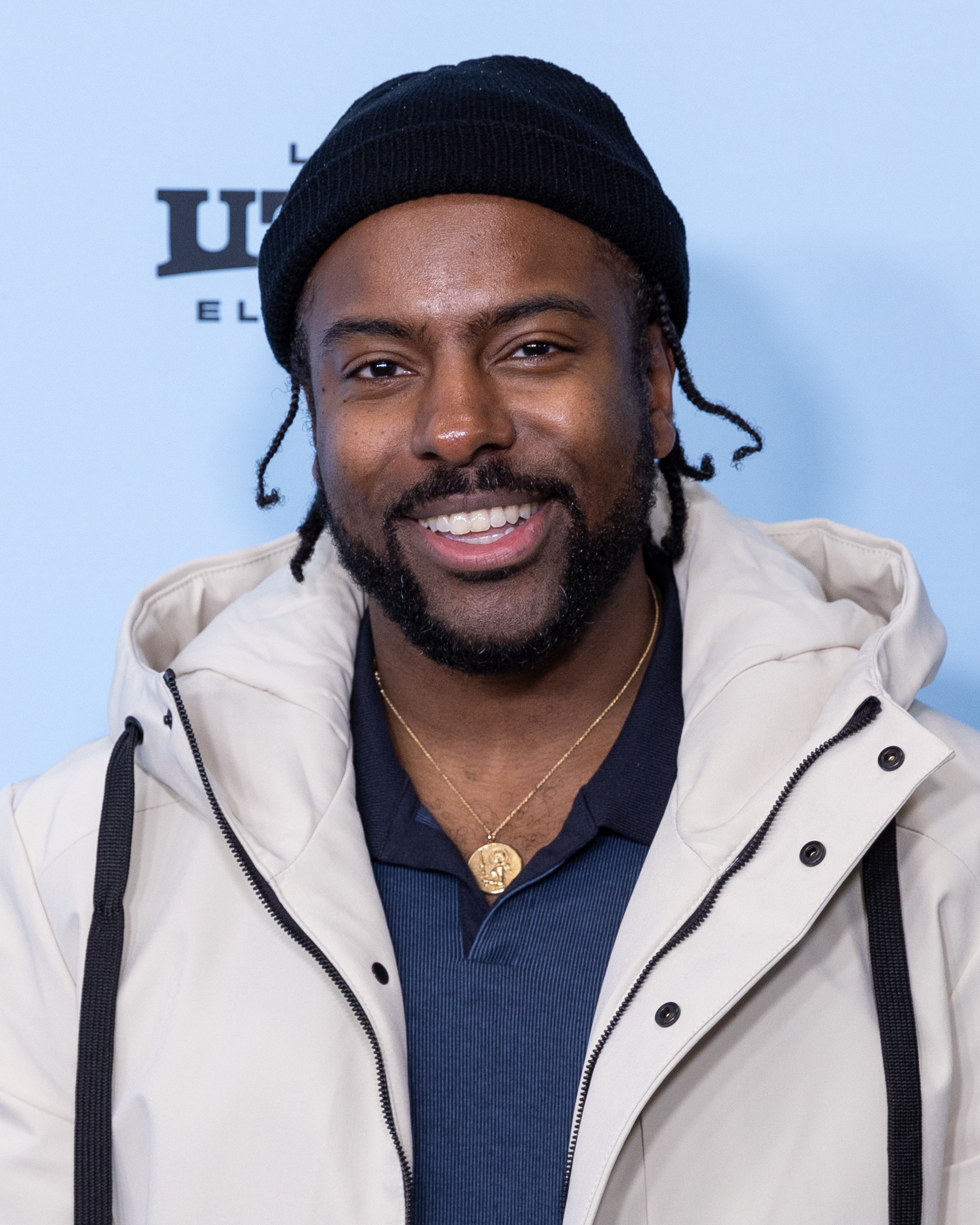
- Ndifornyen at the 2025 Sundance Film Festival
- Born: 18 November 1989 (age 36); London, England
- Occupation: Actor
- Years active: 2002–present
- Known for: Leonardo; Famalam

Akemnji Ndifornyen (born 18 November 1989) is a British actor, writer, composer and producer. On television, he began his career in the BBC series Doctors (2004–2005) and Leonardo (2011–2012). In 2019, he was awarded a BAFTA for his work on the hit BBC comedy series Famalam.

== Career ==
Ndifornyen has appeared in the television shows Casualty, Law & Order: UK, Doctors as Nathan Bailey and The Crouches. He has also starred in feature film Life and Lyrics and in the play The History Boys at the National Theatre. In 2011, he was cast as Niccolò Machiavelli in the program Leonardo. The first series of Leonardo was shot on location in South Africa throughout the second half of 2010. A second series was completed on location in Cape Town and was aired in 2012. In 2019, Akmenji won the BAFTA for Breakthrough Talent for his work as the writer, composer and producer of the BBC Three sketch show Famalam.

It was announced in 2022 that Famalam comedian Gbemisola Ikumelo would be starring in a new BBC series titled Black Ops with actor Hammed Animashaun and Ndifornyen. She plays a woman who signs up to be a community police officer to improve her community, but she and her partner get involved with gang leader Ndifornyen over six episodes. The series is destined for terrestrial channel BBC1 and streaming via the BBC's iPlayer.

== Filmography ==
Year	Title	Role	Notes
2002	Out of Control	Daniel	TV movie
2003	The Crouches	Aiden Crouch	6 episodes
2004-2005	Doctors	Nathan Bailey	206 episodes
2006	Incubus	Bug	
2006	Life and Lyrics	Preach	
2007	Under One Roof	Various	
2007	Casualty	Matt Girven	2 episodes
2010	M.I.High	Pizza Delivery Man	1 episode
2010	Spirit Warriors	Rapper Sun	1 episode
2010	Law & Order: UK	Ray	1 episode
2011-2012	Leonardo	Niccolò Machiavelli	26 episodes (main character)
2013	WPC 56	Donald Palmer	3 episodes
2015	The Javone Prince Show	various	4 episodes
2018	Death in Paradise	Kai Springer	1 episode
2018-2019	Famalam	various	13 episodes
2019-2020	Shrill	Lamar	2 episodes
2020	Mandy	Police Officer	1 episode
2020	The Queen's Gambit	Mr. Fergusson	3 episodes
2023	Black Ops	Tevin	6 episodes - also writer
2025	The Ballad of Wallis Island	Michael	Movie
