= Gabrielle Gutierrez =

Filipina-American stage actress

- Gabrielle Gutierrez, in 2025

Background information
- Born: Gabrielle Alexa Gutierrez; September 29, 2005 (age 21)
- Origin: Queens, New York, U.S.
- Genre: Musical theatre
- Occupations: Singer, actress
- Years active: 2014–present

Gabby Gutierrez (aged 20) professional actress headshot.

Gabrielle Alexa Gutierrez (born September 29, 2005) is a Filipina-American stage actress prominently known as the first Filipina and person-of-color to play the lead role of Matilda in a major musical theatre adaptation of the novel of the same name.

== Career ==
Gutierrez was a piano prodigy, winning the Little Mozarts music competition that gave her the opportunity to perform at Carnegie Hall when she was five years old. She began her formal music career in 2014 when she was cast as Ngana in Paper Mill Playhouse production of Rodgers-Hammerstein classic South Pacific. In late 2014, she was cast as Annie Who for the national tour of How the Grinch Stole Christmas. While working on said production, she was cast as the lead for the Royal Shakespeare Company's Matilda The Musical. She performed with the production from May 2015 through January 2017. She also appeared in Broadway's School of Rock: The Musical as Sofia/Katie u/s in 2016.

== Personal life ==
Gutierrez traces her roots to Bukidnon, Philippines. She resides in Springfield Township, Union County, New Jersey with her older sister and their parents.

Gutierrez currently is a fourth year undergraduate at Northwestern University in the School of Communications pursuing a degree in Theatre (Musical Theatre Certificate Program) and Philosophy (Honor's Candidate), with a minor in Legal Studies.

== Filmography ==
=== Theatre ===
Year	Title	Role	Producer
2014	South Pacific	Ngana	Paper Mill Playhouse
2014	How the Grinch Stole Christmas	Annie Who	Big League Productions
2015	Matilda: The Musical	Matilda	Royal Shakespeare Company
2016	School of Rock: The Musical	Sophia	Winter Garden Theatre

=== Television ===
Year	Title	Role	Duration
2015	Conan	Matilda (promotional guesting)	1 episode
