= Tala Gouveia =

English actress

- Born: Tala Helen Gouveia; 13 February 1988 (age 37); Nottingham, United Kingdom
- Occupation: Actress
- Years active: 2010–present

Tala Helen Gouveia (born 13 February 1988) is an English actress, best known for playing DCI Lauren McDonald in the ITV crime drama McDonald & Dodds (2020–2024).

== Early life ==
Gouveia was born in Nottingham. The daughter of two theatre actors, Gouveia trained at the Bristol Old Vic.

== Career ==
Her first TV job was a small role in EastEnders from 2011 to 2013 as Nurse Green.

Between March 2020 and August 2024, Gouveia played DCI McDonald in the Bath-set ITV police drama McDonald & Dodds opposite Jason Watkins as mismatched detectives and an array of guest stars including Rob Brydon, Patsy Kensit, Martin Kemp and Robert Lindsay. She has also appeared as Gemma Murphy in the ITV1 drama Cold Feet, the CBeebies' children's series Go Jetters, and the BBC1 2018 Christmas show Click & Collect. Gouveia also has credits for the 2019 film Before We Grow Old and has provided the regular voice of Cleo Farr in the animated series Scream Street alongside the likes of Jim Howick, Tyger Drew-Honey, Debra Stephenson and John Thomson.

== Selected filmography ==
Year	Title	Role	Notes
2011–2013	EastEnders	Nurse Green	4 episodes
2015–2018	Scream Street	Cleo Farr	20 episodes
2018	Click and Collect	Toy shop assistant	TV movie
2019	Cold Feet	Gemma Murphy	1 episode
2019–2020	Go Jetters	Tala (voice)	30 episodes
2020	G-Loc	Ohsha	Film
2020–2024	McDonald & Dodds	DCI Lauren McDonald	Series regular
2025	Death in Paradise	Kelly Herbert	1 episode
