= Joe Tucker =

British comedy writer, director and animator

Joe Tucker (born 1982) is a British screenwriter, director and animator.

He trained at the National Film & Television School where he made the award-winning short film For the Love of God. Following this, he directed a number of music videos for Hot Club de Paris and wrote sketches for CBBC series Horrible Histories.

With Lloyd Woolf, he has created and written the television series Parents, Big Bad World, Witless, Black Ops, and Austin, and the TV movie Click & Collect.

He is the nephew of the painter Eric Tucker about whom he has written a book, The Secret Painter, which became a Sunday Times bestseller.
