= Sally Phillips =

British actress (born 1970)

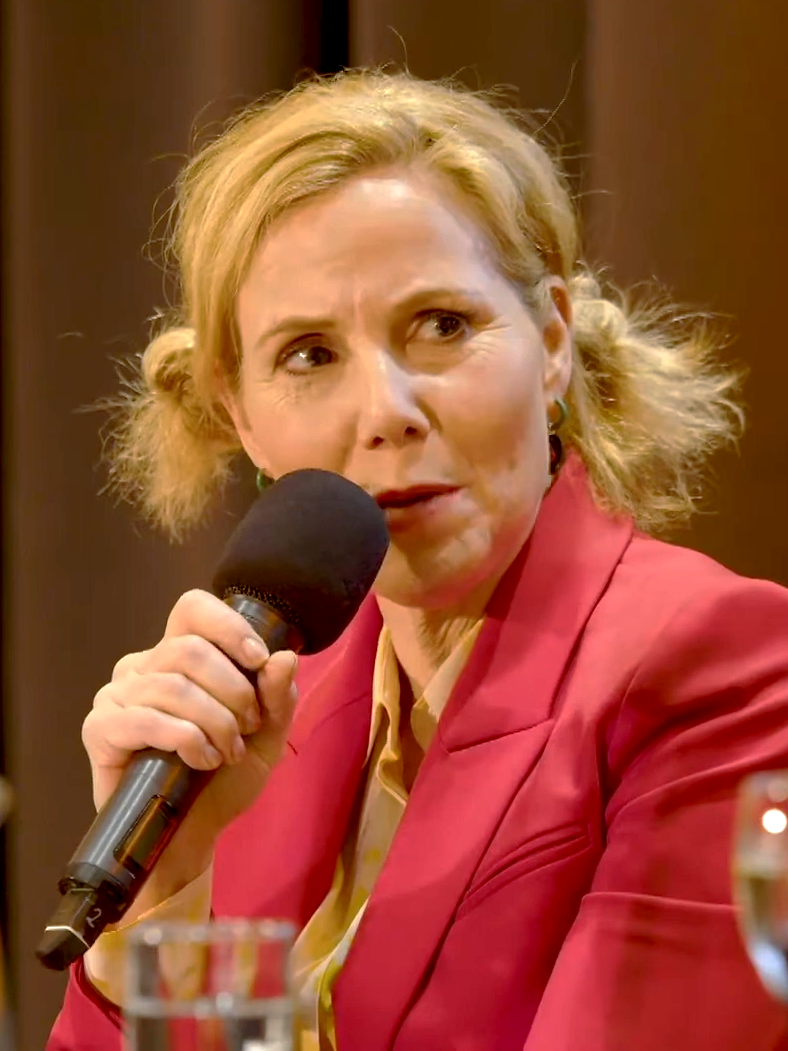
- Phillips in 2023
- Born: Sally Elizabeth Phillips; 10 May 1970 (age 56); British Hong Kong
- Education: New College, Oxford; École Philippe Gaulier
- Occupations: Actress; comedian; television presenter
- Years active: 1994–present
- Spouse: Andrew Bermejo (m. 2003; div. 2017)
- Children: 3
- Phillips' voice Phillips talking in 2019

Sally Elizabeth Phillips (born 10 May 1970) is a British actress. She co-created and was one of the writers of the sketch comedy show Smack the Pony. She is also known for her roles in Jam & Jerusalem as Natasha "Tash" Vine, Miranda as Tilly, I'm Alan Partridge as Sophie, Parents as Jenny Pope, Set the Thames on Fire as Colette in 2015, Zapped as Slasher Morgan, and her guest appearances as the fictional Prime Minister of Finland, Minna Häkkinen, in the US TV series Veep. Phillips also co-starred in Pride and Prejudice and Zombies as Mrs Bennet and in the role of Shazzer in all four films of the Bridget Jones franchise.

From 2004 to 2019, Phillips played the title role in the BBC Radio 4 comedy show Clare in the Community. In 2018 she was curator for series 12 of The Museum of Curiosity on BBC Radio 4.

== Early life and education ==
Sally Elizabeth Phillips was born on 10 May 1970 in Hong Kong, which at the time was under British rule. Her father Tim, later chairman of the All England Lawn Tennis and Croquet Club, was an executive with British Airways. With the family following her father's job, she grew up in the Far East, the Middle East, Italy, and Australia. At the age of 13 she was sent to board at Wycombe Abbey School, where she studied her O-Levels and A-Levels.

Phillips read Italian and linguistics at New College, Oxford, where she joined the Oxford Revue, playing mostly male parts, alongside contemporaries including Stewart Lee and Richard Herring (who went on to have their own television show, Fist of Fun, in which Phillips appeared as "the girl who smells of Spam"). She then co-wrote and performed the one-woman show Benadetta, the Life of a Lesbian Nun in Renaissance Italy, based on a true story. She appeared in the 1990 Oxford Revue THRASH, which also starred Ed Smith.

Phillips gained a first-class honours degree, and applied to write a PhD on the Spaghetti Western. However, she changed her mind, and instead studied clown and drama under Philippe Gaulier at École Philippe Gaulier and Théâtre de Complicité.

== Career ==
Phillips performed at nine consecutive Edinburgh Fringe Festivals, appearing in shows including Ra-Ra-Rasputin, Arthur Smith's version of Hamlet (as Ophelia) and Cluub Zarathustra with Simon Munnery, Stewart Lee, Richard Thomas, Julian Barratt and Lori Lixenburg. Her first television role was in Lee and Herring's Fist of Fun in 1994, followed shortly after by a cameo in Alas Smith and Jones with Mel Smith. In 1995, Phillips played the role of a reporter in the unbroadcast pilot of Chris Morris's spoof series Brass Eye. In Six Pairs Of Pants, six actors produced a number of regular sketches, which developed as the series progressed. The show was written in part by Phillips. Phillips had a role as Sophie, a "Travel Tavern" receptionist in I'm Alan Partridge (1997), and as Laura in Holding the Baby. She played radio DJ Gemma White in the TV series In the Red.

In 1997, Phillips had a starring role in the short-lived 1999 British comedy series Hippies with Simon Pegg and Julian Rhind-Tutt. Phillips garnered a nomination for best female newcomer at the 1999 British Comedy Awards as she, along with Fiona Allen and Doon Mackichan, co-created, wrote, and performed in Smack the Pony.

In 2001, she took the starring role in the David Nicholls series Rescue Me for BBC1. She also wrote episodes for the animation Bob and Margaret.

In 2003, she was listed in The Observer as one of the 50 funniest acts in British comedy. She appeared in Bridget Jones's Diary as Shazza, having previously auditioned for Bridget; the character was based upon the film's director, Sharon Maguire.

In 2004, she took the title role in the BBC radio sitcom Clare in the Community which ended after 74 episodes in 2019. In August 2005, she returned to the stage after a long absence, in Oscar Wilde's The Importance of Being Earnest at the Oxford Playhouse. In 2006, she appeared in the Australian comedy feature BoyTown; on television, she appeared as Clare Winchester in the BBC2 science fiction comedy Hyperdrive.

In the second series of Green Wing, Phillips played the character of Holly, whose appearance threatens the blossoming relationship between Mac (Julian Rhind-Tutt) and Caroline (Tamsin Greig). Between 2006 and 2009, she had a recurring role in the BBC's comedy Jam & Jerusalem.

In 2009, Phillips took the role of Tilly in Miranda as Miranda Hart's character's irritating upper-class friend. The series found critical success and Phillips remained a part of the show throughout its duration, from 2009 to 2015.

Her first feature film script, The Decoy Bride, started production in spring 2010. Phillips appeared in a supporting role in the film, playing Emma, a Hollywood assistant. The film was released in February 2012, premièring first on cable television and as a digital download, and then had a limited theatrical release.

In 2012, she played the lead role in the Sky 1 comedy Parents and also appeared in the CBeebies television series Justin's House. The same year, she also appeared with her son in Something Special.

In the United States, Phillips has made five appearances in the HBO comedy series Veep as Minna Häkkinen, a fictional Finnish prime minister.

In 2014, she narrated the first series of The Supervet on Channel 4.

During 2015, Phillips appeared in several TV shows, notably House of Fools and Death in Paradise. She has also appeared in the comedy Burn Burn Burn as Ingrid, a main character, and also the TV film Distinguished Ladies in which she plays the lead role of Bianca.

Phillips appeared in Pride and Prejudice and Zombies (2016) as Mrs Bennet, and as Shazza in Bridget Jones's Baby.

In 2016, she presented the one-off BBC documentary A World Without Down's Syndrome?, which examined the potential impact of non-invasive prenatal testing (NIPT).

She appeared in All Star Musicals and Tim Vine Travels in Time in December 2017.

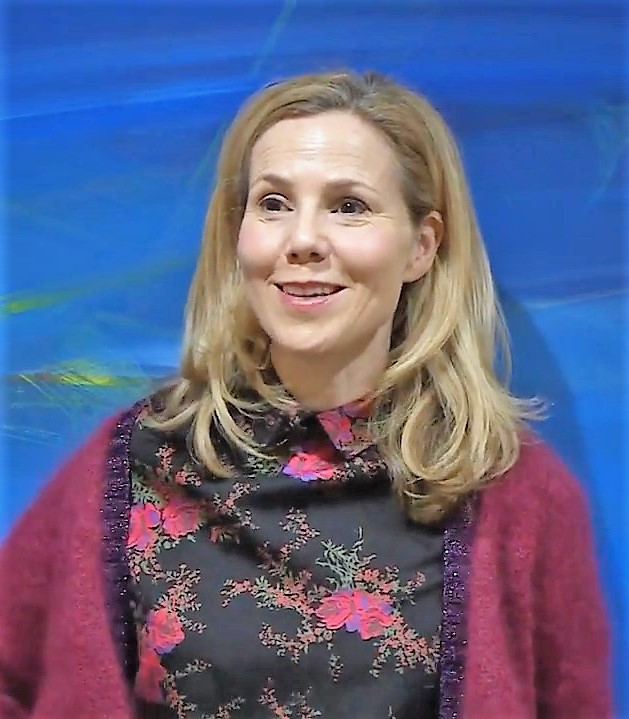
Phillips appears for the Eureka! museum in 2019

In 2018, she played the scatty new night manager Lou in Trollied.

In 2022, she starred as business owner Gina in Australian comedy film How to Please a Woman.

In 2023, she played Tessa in the Netflix romantic comedy Love at First Sight.

In January 2024, she was a guest co-host on the BBC One quiz show Pointless. She starred as Ingrid in the Australian-British comedy series Austin, which premiered in June 2024.

== Personal life ==
In 2002, Phillips was hospitalised with salmonellosis during a charity trip to Mexico. She said the illness led to a brain infection that made her body become a "microbrewery", causing neurological symptoms. Her recovery took months.

She was married to Andrew Bermejo for 14 years and has three sons from their marriage, one with Down syndrome. In 2018, Phillips made a documentary about the ethics of medical screening. In 2017, the couple divorced.

Phillips is a Christian. She is a patron of Blue Apple Theatre (Hampshire, UK) which specialises in creating performance work for adults with a learning disability.

== Filmography ==
+Key	†	Denotes works that have not yet been released

=== Film ===
Year	Title	Role	Notes
2000	Born Romantic	Suzy	
2001	The Invitation	Sarah	Short film
2001	Bridget Jones's Diary	Sharon "Shazza"	
2001	The Junkies	Sal	Short film
2001	Birthday Girl	Karen	
2001	Mean Machine	Tracey	
2002	Blowing It	Patricia	Short film
2004	Tooth	Mom	
2004	Gladiatress	Worthaboutapig	
2004	Bridget Jones: The Edge of Reason	Sharon "Shazza"	
2004	Churchill: The Hollywood Years	Waitress	
2004	Show Ponies	Heidi & Amelia	Short film
2006	BoyTown	Holly	
2010	Huge	Herself	
2011	The Decoy Bride	Emma	Also writer
2012	The Actress	Second Suitor	Short films
2012	Animal Charm	Audrey Hoober	Short films
2014	Rain	Kvinnan	Short films
2014	The Case of the High Foot	Hilda Stolf	Short films
2015	Set the Thames on Fire	Colette	
2015	Seahorse	Martha	Short film
2015	Burn Burn Burn	Ingrid	
2015	Egg	Ivy	Short film
2016	Pride and Prejudice and Zombies	Mrs. Bennet	
2016	Bridget Jones's Baby	Sharon "Shazza"	
2016	Pregnant Pause	Nurse	Short film
2017	The Rizen	The Suited Woman	
2017	Blood Shed	Helen	Short film
2017	Ferdinand	Greta (voice)	
2017	You, Me and Him	Amy	
2018	The More You Ignore Me	Marie Henty	
2018	Little Star	Tiny (animated)	Short film
2018	The Fight	Beth Hunter	
2018	Surviving Christmas with the Relatives	Miriam	
2019	The Rizen: Possession	The Suited Woman	
2019	Blinded by the Light	Mrs. Anderson	
2021	Off the Rails	Liz	
2021	Tiny Dancer	Mum	Short film
2022	How to Please a Woman	Gina	
2022	The Fence	Sharon Knight	
2023	My Happy Ending	Mikey	
2023	Coffee Wars	Lisa	
2023	Love at First Sight	Tessa Jones	
2024	Modì, Three Days on the Wing of Madness	Clementine, The General's Wife	
2024	Twiggy	–	Associate producer
2025	Bridget Jones: Mad About the Boy	Sharon "Shazza"	
2026	Virginia Woolf's Night and Day	Joan Denham	
TBA	† The Survivors Will Envy the Dead	TBA	Short film. Completed
TBA	† The Liar	Beryl	Post-production

=== Television ===
Year	Title	Role	Notes
1995	Smith & Jones	Various	Series 8; Episodes 1 & 3: "Bad Microphones" and "Missing Link"
1995	Six Pairs of Pants	Various characters	Episodes 1–3. Also writer
1995–1996	Fist of Fun	Various	Series 1 & 2; 7 episodes
1996	It Happened Next Year	Various	Television film
1997	I'm Alan Partridge	Sophie	Series 1; Episodes 1–6
1997	Holding the Baby	Laura	Series 1; Episodes 2 & 7
1997	Cows	Pinky	Television film (Pilot for series that was cancelled)
1998	Comedy Nation	Various characters	
1998	In the Red	Jemma White	Mini-series; Episodes 1–3
1998	You Are Here	Laura	Television film
1999	Kiss Me Kate	Natalie	Series 2; Episode 6: "On the Couch"
1999	Hippies	Jill Sprint	Episodes 1–6
1999–2003, 2017	Smack the Pony	Various characters	Series 1-4, and Comic Relief Special; 24 episodes. Also writer
2002	Rescue Me	Katie Nash	Episodes 1–6
2003	Ready When You Are, Mr. McGill	Kelly	Television film
2005	French and Saunders	Nun	Christmas Celebrity Special
2006	Hyperdrive	Clare Winchester	Series 1; Episode 5: "Clare"
2006	Green Wing	Holly Hawkes	Series 2; Episodes 4–7
2006	The Amazing Mrs Pritchard	Meg Bayliss	Episodes 2–6
2006	Seven Second Delay	Meredith	Television film
2006–2009	Jam & Jerusalem	Natasha "Tash" Vine	Series 1–3; 18 episodes
2008	Harley Street	Izzy	Episode 3
2008	Little Rikke	Mum (voice)	Television film
2009	Skins	Angela Moon	Series 3; Episode 4: "Pandora"
2009	Svengali	Michelle	Television short film
2009–2015	Miranda	Tilly	Main character. Series 1–3, and 3 Specials; 15 episodes
2010	Abroad	Jemima Green	Television films
2010	Accidental Farmer	Kat	Television films
2011	New Tricks	Samantha Gerson	Series 8; Episode 5: "Moving Target"
2011	Justin's House	Wanda Round	
2011	Moving On	Christina	Series 3; Episode 4: "Donor"
2012	Parents	Jenny Pope	Main character. Episodes 1–6
2012	Them from That Thing	Various	Mini-series; Episodes 1 & 2
2012–2020	The Undateables	Herself - Narrator	Series 1–11; 45 episodes
2013	Chickens	Miss Trimble	Episode 5: "Leper"
2013	Something Special	Herself - Special Guest	Series 5; 1 episode
2013–2019	Veep	Minna Häkkinen	Series 2, 3 & 5–7; 5 episodes
2014	The Supervet	Herself - Narrator	Series 1; Episodes 1–4
2015	We're Doomed! The Dad's Army Story	Ann Croft	Television film
2015	Death in Paradise	Cheryl Moore	Series 4; Episode 5: "Swimming in Murder"
2015	House of Fools	Mary	Series 2; Episode 6: "The Whip Affair"
2015	Distinguished Ladies	Bianca	Television film
2016	Galavant	Ivanna	Series 2; Episode 4: "Bewitched, Bothered, and Belittled"
2016	Siblings	Aunt Leslie	Series 2; Episode 2: "Golden Aunt"
2016	Mid Morning Matters with Alan Partridge	Charlie Moran (voice)	Series 2; Episode 5: "Massage + Royal Visit"
2016	Midsomer Murders	Lucy Keswick	Series 19; Episode 1: "The Village That Rose from the Dead"
2016	Drunk History	Mary	Series 3; Episode: "Christmas Special"
2016	A World Without Down's Syndrome?	Herself - Presenter	BBC Documentary film
2016–2018	Zapped	Slasher Morgan	Series 1–3; 6 episodes
2017	Henry IX	Queen Katerina	Episodes 1–3: "Reigned In", "Exit Strategy" and "Clearing the Air"
2017	Hospital People	Helena Steel MP, Health Minister	Episode 5: "The New Ward"
2017	Comedy Playhouse	Maid Marion	Series 18; Episode 1: "Tim Vine Travels Through Time"
2017	Comic Relief	Herself - Co-presenter	2017 telethon
2017	Taskmaster	Herself - Contestant	Series 5; Episodes 1–8
2017	Travel Man	Herself - Guest traveller	Series 5; Episode 4: "Stockholm"
2017	All Star Musicals	Herself - Performer	Television Special
2017	Tim Vine Travels Through Time	Catherine of Aragon	Television film (Christmas Special)
2017, 2018	The One Show	Herself - Guest presenter	3 episodes
2017–2026	QI	Herself - Panellist	Series 15–23; 10 episodes
2018	Trollied	Lou Chettle	Series 7; 6 episodes
2018	The Keith & Paddy Picture Show	Dr. Ellie Sattler	Series 2; Episode 5: "Jurassic Park"
2018	Vanity Fair	Lady Steyne	Mini-series; Episodes 6 & 7
2018	Lip Sync Battle UK	Herself - Contestant	Series 2; Episode 5: "Robert Webb vs. Sally Phillips"
2018–2019	Tourist Trap	Elaine Gibbons	Main character. Series 1 & 2; 12 episodes
2019	Archibald's Next Big Thing	Flurbin (voice)	Series 1; Episode 6a: "Mountain Mayhem"
2019	Year of the Rabbit	Princess Juliana of Bulgaria	Mini-series; Episodes 3–6
2020	Friday Night Dinner	Gibby	Series 6; Episode 3: "The Au Pair"
2020	Sunday Morning Live	Herself - Presenter	Series 11; 5 episodes
2021	Meet the Richardsons	Herself	Series 2; 4 episodes (Fictionalised version of herself)
2021	Richard Osman's House of Games	Herself - Contestant	Series 4; Episodes 86–90 (Week 18); Series 5; Episodes 81–85 (Champions Week 1)
2022	Ant & Dec's Saturday Night Takeaway	Florence Nightingale	Series 18; Episode 6 (Segment: "Polter Guys")
2022	Breeders	Gabby	Series 3; Episodes 1, 2 & 9
2022	Murder, They Hope	Alex	Series 2; Episode 2: "A Midsummer Night's Scream"
2022	Pennyworth	The Warden	Series 3; Episode 7: "Don't Push It"
2022	My Life at Christmas	Herself - Presenter	Series 1; Episodes 1–3
2023	Jerk	Monica the Bureaucrat	Series 3; Episode 6
2023	Hapless	The Caterer	Series 2; Episode 2: "The Wedding Planner"
2023	My Life at Easter	Herself - Presenter	Mini-series; Episodes 1 & 2: "Gyles Brandreth" & "Rose Hudson-Wilkin"
2024	The Traitors: The Movie	Diane Carson	Television film (Segment in Comic Relief: Funny for Money)
2024	Big Mood	Dr. Burrows	Series 1; Episode 3: "Deeper"
2024	Queenie	Gina Hargadon	Episodes 1–3, 5 & 8
2024	Pointless	Herself - Guest assistant	Series 30; Episodes 35–45
2024–present	Austin	Ingrid Hartswood	Main role; 16 episodes Also executive producer
2024–present	We Might Regret This	Jane	8 episodes
2026	The Hairdresser Mysteries	Lily Petal	Main Role; 6 episodes

== Audiobooks ==
Year	Title	Author	Notes	Refs.
2022	The Satsuma Complex	Bob Mortimer	Co-read with Bob Mortimer	

== Theatre ==
Year	Title	Role	Notes
2026	Relics	Olivia	
