= Parents (TV series) =

2012 British sitcom

- Genre: Sitcom
- Written by: Lloyd Woolf; Joe Tucker
- Directed by: Simon Delaney
- Starring: Sally Phillips; Darren Strange; Tom Conti; Susie Blake; Jadie Rose Hobson; Christian Lees
- Composer: Samuel Karl Bohn
- Country of origin: United Kingdom
- Original language: English
- No. of series: 1
- No. of episodes: 6

Production
- Running time: 30mins (inc. adverts)
- Production company: Objective Productions

Original release
- Network: Sky 1
- Release: 6 July – 3 August 2012

Parents is a British sitcom starring Sally Phillips as Jenny Pope, a middle-class woman in her forties who moves, along with her husband and their teenage son and daughter, from London, to live with her parents in Kettering. The show ran for one series, broadcast on Sky 1 from 6 July to 3 August 2012. On 5 March 2013, Sky confirmed that Parents would not return for a second series.

== Cast ==
- Sally Phillips as Jenny Pope
- Darren Strange as Nick Pope
- Tom Conti as Len Miller
- Susie Blake as Alma Miller
- Jadie Rose Hobson as Becky Pope
- Christian Lees as Sam Pope

== Episodes ==
No.	Title	Directed by	Written by	Original release date	UK viewers (millions)
1	"Episode One"	Simon Delaney	Lloyd Woolf, Joe Tucker	6 July 2012	538,000
Fortysomething Jenny asks a favour of Mum and Dad: Can she and her family move in with them?
2	"Episode Two"	Simon Delaney	Lloyd Woolf, Joe Tucker	6 July 2012	445,000
Nick tries to work his persuasive powers on Len to get some office space; Jenny has an awkward encounter with an ex.
3	"Episode Three"	Simon Delaney	Lloyd Woolf, Joe Tucker	13 July 2012	<382,000
Alma attempts to cheer Jenny up with a surprise visit from one of her London pals, but the visitors aren't exactly welcomed with open arms.
4	"Episode Four"	Simon Delaney	Lloyd Woolf, Joe Tucker	20 July 2012	363,000
Feelings of resentment towards Alma flood back when Jenny stumbles upon her old diary; the first test batch of Nick's energy drink X-Celsior arrives.
5	"Episode Five"	Simon Delaney	Lloyd Woolf, Joe Tucker	27 July 2012	260,000
Valentine's Day brings out the best and worst in the Pope-Miller household. Alma is unimpressed with Len, and Jenny is preoccupied by the auction of her house.
6	"Episode Six"	Simon Delaney	Lloyd Woolf, Joe Tucker	3 August 2012	257,000
It looks like the Popes could be back on track when Jenny lands a promising job interview.

== Home media ==
The complete series was released on DVD on 29 July 2013 by Channel 4 DVD.

== Reception ==
The show was met with a generally positive critical response, becoming increasingly positive throughout its run. The Independent called it "a broad family comedy, both funny and 'now'". Heat Magazine described the first episode as "good fun" whilst The Telegraph said it "shows some promise and boasts a good cast" and praised the writing, saying "the script is sharp, zeitgeisty, and just the right side of cloying". The Guardian was more critical of episode one, saying it "fails to make the leap from paper to screen" but responded much more positively to subsequent episodes, calling the show "an utter pleasure" and "beautifully written". The Mirror also praised the series, calling it "very funny" and saying that "as well as a great cast, Parents also has a great big heart and it's this that could keep it beating into further series".
