= For the Love of God (2007 film) =

- Directed by: Joe Tucker
- Screenplay by: Joe Tucker & Raphael Warner
- Produced by: Raphael Warner
- Starring: Steve Coogan; Ian McKellen
- Cinematography: Liam Iandoli
- Edited by: Miikka Leskinen
- Music by: Miguel D'Oliveira
- Animation by: Joe Tucker
- Production companies: National Film & Television School
- Release date: 2007
- Running time: 11 minutes
- Country: United Kingdom
- Language: English

For the Love of God is a 2007 short animation starring Steve Coogan and Ian McKellen, directed by Joe Tucker, and produced at the National Film & Television School.

Since creating the film, Joe Tucker has gone on to direct another three short films, and is also a writer for television.

== Plot ==
The film tells the story of Graham, a balding man living under the glare of his overbearing mother and their pet talking jackdaw in their home and Christian bookshop.

Graham orders a blow-up doll, which explodes to form a mural of God on his ceiling. With the encouragement of his pet jackdaw, he calls a sex line and tells them he wants to have sex with God, after which they hang up. Graham then gets squashed by a bookshelf, and wakes up in heaven. God looks like his mother.

== Cast ==
- Steve Coogan as Graham (voice)
- Ian McKellen as the jackdaw
- Julia Davis

== Production ==
The film was put together as a graduation project at the National Film and Television School. It was inspired by media coverage of celebrity sex tapes.

The film was shot over three months. It took a long time, as it is shot cinematically, rather than with a static camera as is more traditional in stop-motion films.

== Awards and reception ==
In 2007, it was the only British film in official competition at the Cannes Film Festival. It was in the Cinéfondation section, reserved for film school students.

The film won a number of international awards including a Silver Hugo at Chicago International Film Festival and Best Animation at Santa Barbara International Film Festival and Rhode Island International Film Festival.
