= Click & Collect =

2018 British TV movie

- Written by: Joe Tucker; Lloyd Woolf
- Directed by: Ben Palmer
- Starring: Stephen Merchant; Asim Chaudhry; Sophia Di Martino
- Music by: Oli Julian
- Country of origin: United Kingdom
- Original language: English

Production
- Producer: Sam Ward
- Editor: Mark Henson
- Running time: 53 minutes
- Production companies: Mondo Deluxe Productions; BBC Studios

Original release
- Release: 24 December 2018

Click & Collect is a British comedy television film directed by Ben Palmer, written by Joe Tucker and Lloyd Woolf. The film stars Asim Chaudhry and Stephen Merchant, following Andrew and his neighbour Dev as they travel 300 miles to Carlisle to buy a Christmas present for Andrew's daughter.

== Plot ==
Andrew Bennett is an uptight father in Bedford and lives in a semi-detached house with his wife Claire and their daughter. On Christmas Eve, after he fails to get his daughter the Christmas present she wants the most—a Sparklehoof the Unicorn Princess toy—and instead settling for a chemistry set, his extroverted next-door neighbour Dev D'Cruz informs Andrew and Claire that he managed to find the toy online. However, the last unit in the country is in Carlisle, 300 miles away from Bedford, and Dev has chosen to "click and collect". Because the payment details are on Dev's credit card, Andrew has no choice but to drive with him to get the toy.

During the trip, Dev accidentally causes several mishaps that increasingly annoy Andrew. At a petrol station, Dev accidentally fills the car's fuel tank with diesel fuel, causing the car to break down. After Dev explains that he will be alone on Christmas, due to his children being with his ex that year, Andrew accepts to rent a buggy. As they are about to buy the toy, they realise that a cashier at a service station switched out Dev's credit card for hers, allowing her to steal the toy. The two devise a plan to break into her house and steal the toy. Once inside, they realise that the toy is for her daughter, who is a big fan of Sparklehoof the Unicorn Princess and is diagnosed with cancer. Feeling guilty, they decide to leave the toy with the young girl.

Back at the service station, Dev comes across a claw machine with the toy inside. They use every coin they have, but fail. Just as they accept defeat, a homeless man gives them one last coin, which Dev uses to successfully win the toy. The two are ecstatic, but on their way home, Dev finds a letter that Andrew had written before the trip, which states that they are not friends. While Andrew returns home with the toy while his daughter is asleep, Dev wakes up alone on Christmas morning. He goes outside to find that Andrew had restored Dev's Christmas lights that he had previously taken down, and the former invites the latter to a Christmas party.

== Cast and characters ==
- Stephen Merchant as Andrew Bennett
- Asim Chaudhry as Dev D'Cruz
- Sophia Di Martino as Claire Bennett
- Sophie Willan as Jessie
- Tala Gouveia as a toy shop assistant
- Jason Barnett as a toy shop customer
- Steven Wickham as a homeless man
- Emily Aston as a burger bar worker
- Darcy Ewart as Emily Bennett

== Reception ==
Click & Collect received positive reviews across the British press. The Independent called it an "instant classic", The Guardian described it as "funny and tender", The Observer as "excellent", Stephen Merchant and Asim Chaudhry were described by The Telegraph as "a mismatch made in heaven". A number of reviewers noted the similarities with Planes, Trains and Automobiles and Jingle All the Way, with The Times noting that "these references are done with a wink". Metro described it as "comforting, sharply written Christmas TV", whilst The Daily Telegraph praised the "lively script" and "warm hearted satire", stating: "Click & Collect offered proof that, in certain circumstances, it is possible to have your cake and eat it. It subjected Christmas to a testy satirical buffeting while also smothering it with reverence as an enfolding nationwide group hug." More recently, the Radio Times has called it "an absolutely joyous hour-long BBC film which... has made its way into many an annual watchlist."

== See also ==
- List of Christmas films
