= 2021 British Academy Television Awards =

Awards recognising the excellence of British television in 2020

67th British Academy Television Awards
- Date: 6 June 2021
- Hosted by: Richard Ayoade

Highlights
- Best Comedy Series: Inside No. 9
- Best Drama: Save Me Too
- Best Actor: Paul Mescal; Normal People
- Best Actress: Michaela Coel; I May Destroy You
- Best Comedy Performance: Charlie Cooper This Country; Aimee Lou Wood Sex Education
- Most awards: I May Destroy You (2)
- Most nominations: Small Axe (6)

Television coverage
- Channel: BBC One

The 2021 British Academy Television Awards were held on 6 June 2021, to recognise the excellence in British television of 2020. The nominees were announced along with the nominees for the 2021 British Academy Television Craft Awards on 28 April 2021, while the shortlist for the Virgin Media Must-See-Moment were announced the day before, on 27 April 2021. The ceremony was hosted for the second year in a row by Richard Ayoade.

The only television programme to win multiple awards at the ceremony was I May Destroy You, with star and creator Michaela Coel collecting both Best Miniseries and Best Actress.

== Rule and award changes ==
In October 2020, the British Academy of Film and Television Arts (BAFTA) announced several changes in its rules and categories, both to achieve a wider variety of nominees and in response to the ongoing COVID-19 pandemic and its impact on the television industry:

- For the individual performance categories, the number of nominees increased from four to six.
- A new category, Best Daytime, was introduced, to recognise "the important role that daytime programming plays in the lives of viewers and in providing a pipeline for new and underrepresented talent".
- Due to the COVID-19 pandemic, the eligibility period for the Best Soap and Continuing Drama category was extended to the end of January 2021.
- A new requirement meant that at least half of the nominees in each category had to be members of a minority group (LGBT, non-white, disabled etc.).
- Transgender and non-binary individuals were allowed to choose which gender category to be considered for.

BAFTA suspended its Fellowship and Special Awards while reviewing its selection processes, after facing criticism for honouring Noel Clarke in April 2021 despite being aware of misconduct allegations against him.

== Winners and nominees ==
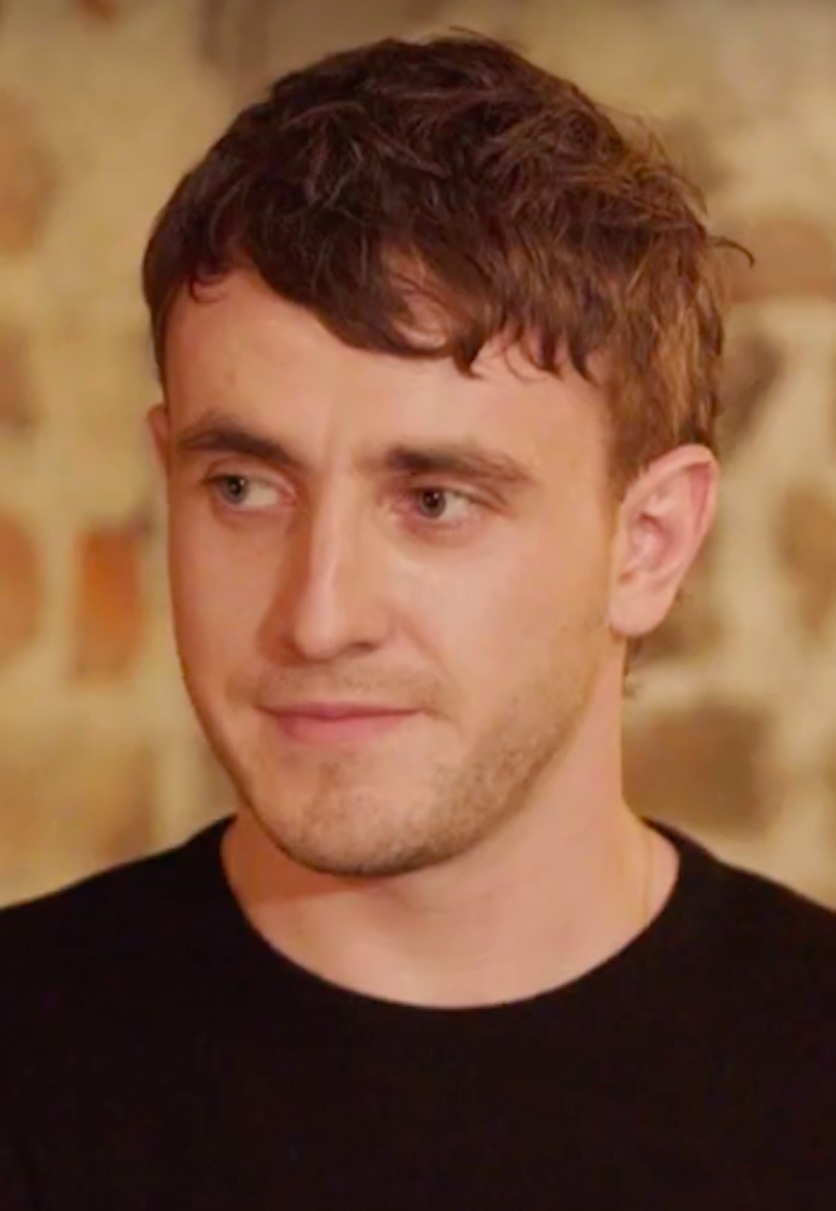
Paul Mescal, Best Actor winner

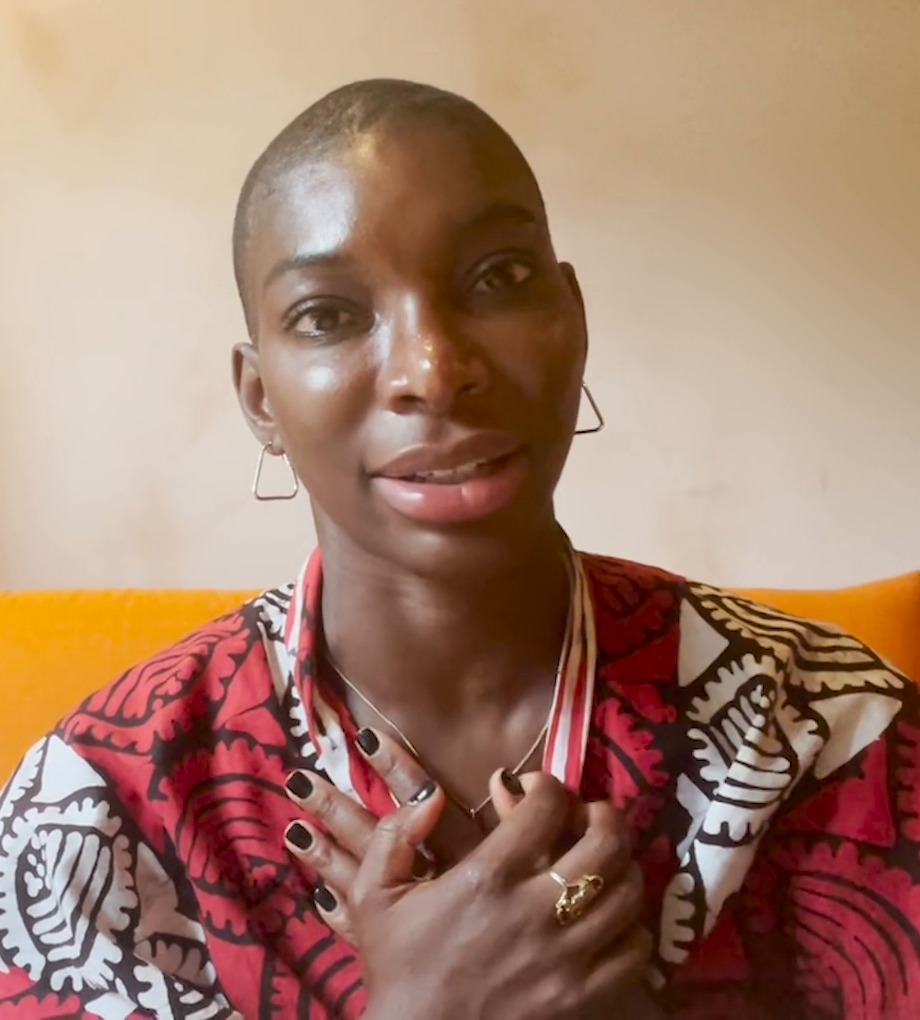
Michaela Coel, Best Actress winner

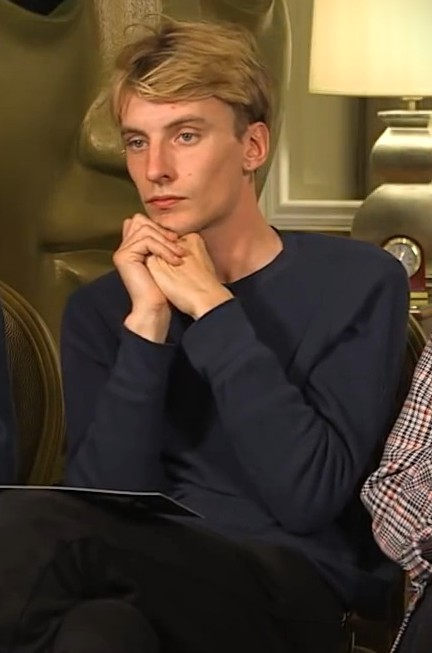
Charlie Cooper, Best Male Comedy Performance winner

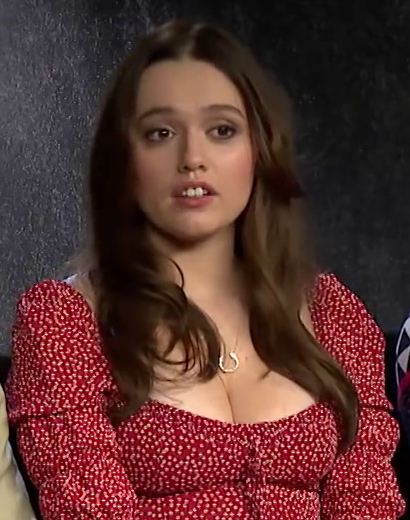
Aimee Lou Wood, Best Female Comedy Performance winner

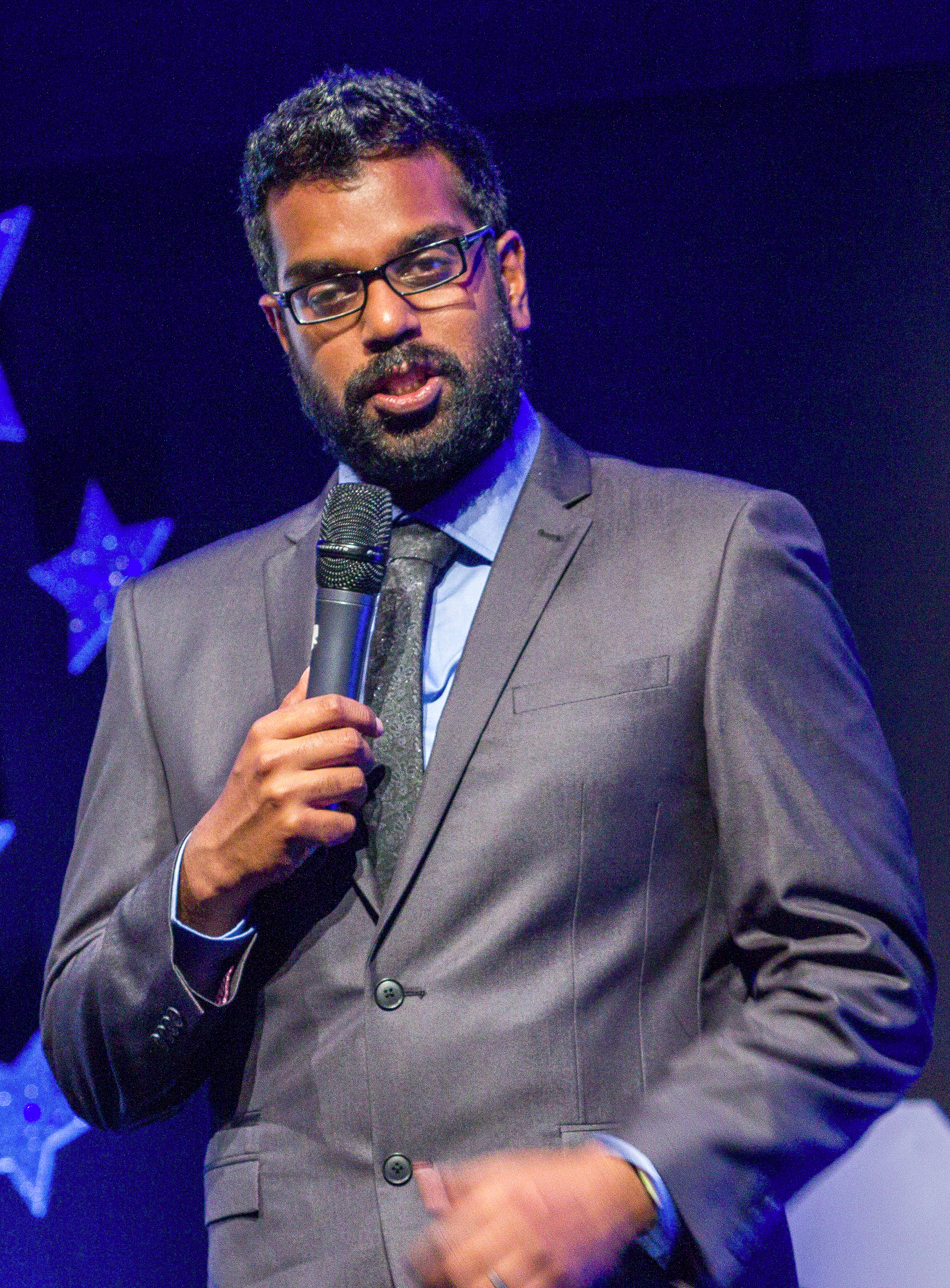
Romesh Ranganathan, Best Entertainment Performance winner

Best Drama Series	Best Mini-Series
Save Me Too (Sky Atlantic); The Crown (Netflix); I Hate Suzie (Sky Atlantic); Gangs of London (Sky Atlantic)	I May Destroy You (BBC One); Adult Material (Channel 4); Normal People (BBC Three); Small Axe (BBC One)
Best Single Drama	Best Soap and Continuing Drama
Sitting in Limbo (BBC One); Anthony (BBC One); BBW (On the Edge) (Channel 4); The Windermere Children (BBC Two)	Casualty (BBC One); Coronation Street (ITV); EastEnders (BBC One); Hollyoaks (Channel 4)
Best Actor	Best Actress
Paul Mescal – Normal People as Connell Waldron (BBC Three); John Boyega – Small Axe as Leroy Logan (BBC One); Paapa Essiedu – I May Destroy You as Kwame (BBC One); Josh O'Connor – The Crown as Charles, Prince of Wales (Netflix); Shaun Parkes – Small Axe as Frank Crichlow (BBC One); Waleed Zuaiter – Baghdad Central as Muhsin al-Khafaji (Channel 4)	Michaela Coel – I May Destroy You as Arabella Essiedu (BBC One); Jodie Comer – Killing Eve as Villanelle (BBC One); Daisy Edgar-Jones – Normal People as Marianne Sheridan (BBC Three); Billie Piper – I Hate Suzie as Suzie Pickles (Sky Atlantic); Hayley Squires – Adult Material as Hayley Burrows (Channel 4); Letitia Wright – Small Axe as Altheia Jones-LeCointe (BBC One)
Best Supporting Actor	Best Supporting Actress
Malachi Kirby – Small Axe as Darcus Howe (BBC One); Rupert Everett – Adult Material as Carroll Quinn (Channel 4); Tobias Menzies – The Crown as Prince Philip, Duke of Edinburgh (Netflix); Kunal Nayyar – Criminal: UK as Sandeep Singh (Netflix); Michael Sheen – Quiz as Chris Tarrant (ITV); Micheal Ward – Small Axe as Franklyn (BBC One)	Rakie Ayola – Anthony as Gee Walker (BBC One); Helena Bonham Carter – The Crown as Princess Margaret, Countess of Snowdon (Netflix); Leila Farzad – I Hate Suzie as Naomi Jones (Sky Atlantic); Siena Kelly – Adult Material as Amy (Channel 4); Sophie Okonedo – Criminal: UK as Julia Bryce (Netflix); Weruche Opia – I May Destroy You as Terry Pratchard (BBC One)
Best Male Comedy Performance	Best Female Comedy Performance
Charlie Cooper – This Country as Lee "Kurtan" Mucklowe (BBC Three); Ncuti Gatwa – Sex Education as Eric Effiong (Netflix); Joe Gilgun – Brassic as Vincent "Vinnie" O'Neill (Sky One); Guz Khan – Man Like Mobeen as Mobeen (BBC Three); Paul Ritter – Friday Night Dinner as Martin Goodman (Channel 4); Reece Shearsmith – Inside No. 9 as Various characters (BBC Two)	Aimee Lou Wood – Sex Education as Aimee Gibbs (Netflix); Daisy May Cooper – This Country as Kerry Mucklowe (BBC Three); Daisy Haggard – Breeders as Ally (Sky One); Gbemisola Ikumelo – Famalam as Various characters (BBC Three); Emma Mackey – Sex Education as Maeve Wiley (Netflix); Mae Martin – Feel Good as Mae (Channel 4) (Note: Martin identifies as non-binary.)
Best Scripted Comedy	Best Comedy and Comedy Entertainment Programme
Inside No. 9 (BBC Two); Ghosts (BBC One); Man Like Mobeen (BBC Three); This Country (BBC Three)	The Big Narstie Show (Channel 4); Charlie Brooker's Antiviral Wipe (BBC Two); The Ranganation (BBC Two); Rob & Romesh VS (Sky One)
Best Entertainment Performance	Lew Grade Award for Entertainment Programme
Romesh Ranganathan – The Ranganation (BBC Two); Adam Hills – The Last Leg (Channel 4); David Mitchell – Would I Lie to You? at Christmas (BBC One); Graham Norton – The Graham Norton Show (BBC One); Bradley Walsh – Beat the Chasers (ITV); Claudia Winkleman – Strictly Come Dancing (BBC One)	Life & Rhymes (Sky Arts); Ant & Dec's Saturday Night Takeaway (ITV); Strictly Come Dancing (BBC One); The Masked Singer (ITV)
Best Factual Series or Strand	Huw Wheldon Award for Specialist Factual
Once Upon a Time in Iraq (BBC Two); Crime and Punishment (Channel 4); Hospital (BBC Two); Losing it: Our Mental Health Emergency (Channel 4)	The Surgeon's Cut (Netflix); Extinction: The Facts (BBC One); Putin: A Russian Spy Story (Channel 4); The Rise of the Murdoch Dynasty (BBC Two)
Robert Flaherty Award for Single Documentary	Best Feature
Locked In: Breaking in the Silence (Storyville) (BBC Four); American Murder: The Family Next Door (Netflix); Anton Ferdinand: Football, Racism and Me (BBC One); Surviving COVID (Channel 4)	Long Lost Family: Born without Trace (ITV); Big Zuu’s Big Easts (Dave); Mortimer & Whitehouse: Gone Fishing (BBC Two); The Repair Shop (BBC One)
Best Reality and Constructed Factual	Best Live Event
The School That Tried To End Racism (Channel 4); MasterChef: The Professionals (BBC One); Race Across the World (BBC Two); The Write Offs (Channel 4)	Springwatch 2020 (BBC Two); Life Drawing Live! (BBC Four); The Royal British Legion Festival of Remembrance (BBC One); The Third Day: Autumn (HBO/Sky Arts)
Best News Coverage	Best Current Affairs
Sky News: Inside IDLIB (Sky News); BBC News at Ten: Prime Minister Admitted to Intensive Care (BBC News/BBC One); Channel 4 News: Deterring Democracy (Channel 4 News/Channel 4); Newsnight: COVID Care Crisis (BBC Two)	America's War on Abortion (Exposure) (ITV); Italy's Frontline: A Doctor's Diary (BBC Two); The Battle for Hong Kong (Dispatches) (Channel 4); The Cyprus Papers Undercover (Al Jazeera Investigations) (Al Jazeera English)
Best Daytime	Best Short Form Programme
The Great House Giveaway (Channel 4); Jimmy McGovern's Moving On (BBC One); Richard Osman's House of Games (BBC Two); The Chase (ITV)	They Saw the Sun First (Red Bull TV); Criptales (BBC Four); Disabled Not Defeated: The Rock Band with Learning Disabilities (Vice/Noisey); The Main Part (BBC iPlayer)
Best International Programme	Virgin TV's Must-See Moment
Welcome to Chechnya: The Gay Purge (Storyville) (BBC Four); Little America (AppleTV +); Lovecraft Country (HBO/Sky Atlantic); Unorthodox (Netflix)	Britain's Got Talent – "Diversity perform a routine inspired by the events of 2020" (ITV); Bridgerton – "Penelope is revealed as Lady Whistledown" (Netflix); EastEnders – "Gray kills Chantelle" (BBC One); Gogglebox – "Reactions to Boris Johnson's press conference" (Channel 4); The Mandalorian – "Luke Skywalker appears" (Disney+); Nigella's Cook, Eat, Repeat – "Mee-cro-wah-vay" (BBC Two)
Best Sport
England v West Indies Test Cricket (Sky Sports Cricket); Bahrain Grand Prix (Sky Sports Formula 1); England v France: The Final of Autumn Nations Cup (Amazon Prime Video); London Marathon 2020 (BBC One)

== Ceremony ==
The ceremony had a traditional red carpet, and nominees could attend via video or in-person. They sat in the venue in socially-distanced groups by television programme. Some award presenters, like Bob Mortimer and Catherine Zeta-Jones, also presented virtually. Tom Allen and AJ Odudu hosted red carpet coverage.

To open the ceremony, Olly Alexander performed "Starstruck"; the performance was outside the venue. Alexander also presented an award with It's a Sin co-star Lydia West. During the ceremony, Alexis Ffrench performed a piano version of "Bluebird" for the In Memoriam.

The public vote for the "Must-See Moment" awarded dance troupe Diversity performing a routine based on the Black Lives Matter movement; the performance was conversely also the most complained-about television moment of the year. Lead dancer Ashley Banjo said that the award win "is what change looks like", as many of the complaints had been racially-charged. In accepting her award for Best Actress for I May Destroy You, Michaela Coel, who had created the show based on things that had happened to her, spoke about the importance of intimacy coordinators.

In entertainment programming, the spoken word show Life & Rhymes was considered a surprise win, competing in a category against programmes the BBC described as "heavyweights", as was entertainment performance winner Romesh Ranganathan.

== In Memoriam ==
- Ann Lynn
- Larry King
- Tony Morris
- Frank Windsor
- Ronald Pickup
- Sabine Schmitz
- Des O'Connor CBE
- Charlotte Cornwell
- Ronald Forfar
- Eileen Pollock
- Alan Igbon
- Peter Alliss
- Murray Walker OBE
- Nikki Grahame
- Tony Armatrading
- Alan Curtis
- Mark Eden
- Archie Lyndhurst
- Johnny Briggs MBE
- Geoffrey Palmer OBE
- Nicola Pagett
- Margaret Nolan
- Bobby Ball
- Charles Beeson
- Colin Leventhal
- Mahmood Jamal
- Frank Bough
- John Sessions
- Paul Ritter
- Rosalind Knight
- Trevor Peacock
- Dame Diana Rigg DBE
- Helen McCrory OBE

Viewers commented on the lack of presence of Dame Barbara Windsor's name; BAFTA responded that she had been included in the In Memoriam of the Film Awards ceremony in April.

== See also ==
- 2021 British Academy Television Craft Awards
- 2021 in television
- 74th British Academy Film Awards
- Impact of the COVID-19 pandemic on television
