= Cirencester Deer Park School =

Coordinates: 51°42′45″N 1°59′16″W

Location
- Stroud Road; Cirencester, Gloucestershire, GL7 1XB; England

Information
- Type: Academy
- Established: 1966
- Department for Education URN: 136527 Tables
- Ofsted: Reports
- Head teacher: Esther Messinger
- Gender: Mixed
- Age: 11 to 16
- Enrolment: 953
- Colours: Navy, white and yellow
- Website: www.deerparkschool.net

Cirencester Deer Park School is a secondary school with academy status in Cirencester, Gloucestershire, England. It is at the top of Tetbury Hill, an area which had been the site of a World War II American Army Hospital, in Cirencester Park.

== History ==
Founded in 1966, the school combined Cirencester Grammar School with the town's secondary modern school. In 1991 the sixth form was separated into an independent college, Cirencester College, which now shares the same campus as the school. New buildings were built to replace those it had lost to the college.

It became a Technology College in 1995, and a beacon school in 1999. It was converted to an academy in April 2011.

In 2023, the school achieved a "Good" Ofsted report.

In 2020 there were 920 pupils on roll at the school.

== Notable former pupils ==
- Charlie Cooper, actor and writer of BBC Three series This Country
- Daisy May Cooper, actor and writer of BBC Three series This Country
- Jake Lee, professional footballer (Cheltenham Town F.C., Weston-super-Mare A.F.C.)
- Josh Record, singer/songwriter
- Pete Reed, double Olympic Gold Medalist in Rowing (2008, 2012)
- Phoebe Paterson Pine, Paralympics Gold Medalist in Archery (2020)

== Former headteachers ==
- 1997–2003 – Sir David Carter
- 1991–1997 – David Crossley
- 2003–2022 – Chiquita Henson
- 2022–2024 – Richard Clutterbuck (brother of Andrew Lincoln)
- 2024-2025 - Helen Charlesworth and Liz Lang
- 2025–Present - Esther Messinger
