= 2021 British Academy Television Craft Awards =

British television awards

22nd British Academy Television Craft Awards
- Date: 24 May 2021
- Hosted by: Gbemisola Ikumelo

The 22nd Annual British Academy Television Craft Awards are presented by the British Academy of Film and Television Arts (BAFTA) and were held on 24 May 2021. The nominees were announced on 28 April 2021. The ceremony was hosted by Gbemisola Ikumelo.

== Rule changes ==
In October 2020, BAFTA announced several changes in some categories the craft awards and the general ceremony

- The category Best Breakthrough Talent was renamed and divided into two categories, Best Emerging Talent: Factual and Best Emerging Talent: Fiction.

== Winners and nominees ==
Winners are first and highlighted in boldface.

Best Emerging Talent: Fiction	Best Emerging Talent: Factual
**Georgi Banks-Davies (director) – I Hate Suzie (Sky Atlantic)**; Harry Tulley (dubbing mixer) – Anthony (BBC One); Stephen S. Thompson (writer) – Sitting in Limbo (BBC One); William Stefan Smith (director) – On the Edge: BBW (Channel 4)	**Marian Mohamed (director) – Defending Digga D (BBC Three)**; Ashley Francis-Roy (shooting producer/director) – Damilola: The Boy Next Door & The Real Eastenders (Channel 4); Jessica Kelly (director) – The Schools that Chain Boys (BBC Two); Kandise Abiola (producer) – Terms & Conditions: A UK Drill Story (YouTube)
Best Costume Design	Best Director: Factual
**Jacqueline Durran – Small Axe (BBC One)**; Rosa Dias – Sex Education (Netflix); James Keast – Belgravia (EPIX/ITV); Amy Roberts – The Crown (Netflix)	**Teresa Griffiths – Lee Miller – A Life on the Front Line (BBC Two)**; Xavier Alford – Locked in: Breaking the Silence (BBC Four); James Bluemel – Once Upon a Time in Iraq (BBC Two); Deeyah Khan – America's War on Abortion (ITV)
Best Director: Fiction	Best Director: Multi-Camera
**Michaela Coel and Sam Miller – I May Destroy You (BBC One)**; Lenny Abrahamson – Normal People (BBC Three); Benjamin Caron – The Crown (Netflix); Steve McQueen – Small Axe (BBC One)	**Marcus Viner – ENO's Drive & Live: La Bohème (Sky Arts)**; Bridget Caldwell – The Royal British Legion Festival of Remembrance (BBC One); Ken Burton – Rugby League Challenge Cup Final (BBC One); Nikki Parsons – Strictly Come Dancing (BBC One)
Best Editing: Factual	Best Editing: Fiction
**Claire Guillon – Lee Miller – A Life on the Front Line (BBC Two)**; Adam Finch – Putin: A Russian Spy Story (Channel 4); Anna Price – Once Upon a Time in Iraq (BBC Two); Will Grayburn – Once Upon a Time in Iraq (BBC Two)	**Editing Team – I May Destroy You (BBC One)**; Chris Dickens and Steve McQueen – Small Axe; Nathan Nugent – Normal People (BBC Three); Pia Di Ciaula – Quiz (ITV)
Best Entertainment Craft Team	Best Make Up and Hair Design
**Mark Busk-Cowley, Roy Callow, Steve Kruger, Andy Milligan, James Tinsley, Mathieu Weekes – I'm a Celebrity...Get Me Out of Here! (ITV)**; Andrew Milligan, Mark Busk-Cowley, Gurdip Mahal, Rob Ashard, Claudine Taylor – Ant & Dec's Saturday Night Takeaway (ITV); David Bishop, Andy Payne, Lucy Foster – Last Night of the Proms (BBC One); David Bishop, Darren Lovell, David Newton, Richard Sillitto, Andy Tapley, Catherine Land – Strictly Come Dancing (BBC One)	**Jojo Williams – Small Axe (BBC One)**; Bethany Swan – I May Destroy You (BBC One); Cate Hall – The Crown (Netflix); Louise Coles, Sarah Nuth, Lorraine Glynn, Erin Ayanian – The Great (Starzplay)
Best Original Music	Best Photography: Factual
**Harry Escott – Roadkill (BBC One)**; Cristobal Tapia de Veer – The Third Day (Sky Atlantic); H. Scott Salinas – Baghdad Central (Channel 4); Martin Phipps – The Crown (Netflix)	**Johnny Shipley, Drone Camera Team, John Livesey – The Great Mountain Sheep Gather (BBC Four)**; Richard Kirby, Sue Gibson, Max Kölbl, Robert Hollingworth – Tiny World (Apple TV+); Tim Cragg – Fear City: New York vs the Mafia (Netflix); Will Edwards and Michael O'Halloran – Marina Abramović Takes Over TV (Sky Arts)
Best Photography & Lighting: Fiction	Best Production Design
**Shabier Kirchner – Small Axe (BBC One)**; Ed Rutherford – Little Birds (Sky Atlantic); Rob Hardy – Devs (BBC Two); Suzie Lavelle – Normal People (BBC Three)	**Helen Scott – Small Axe (BBC One)**; Joel Collins – His Dark Materials (BBC One); Matt Gant and Megan Bosaw – Gangs of London (Sky Atlantic); Samantha Harley and Alexandra Slade – Sex Education (Netflix)
Best Scripted Casting	Best Sound: Factual
**Gary Davy – Small Axe (BBC One)**; Kate Rhodes James – Baghdad Central (Channel 4); Lauren Evans – Sex Education (Netflix); Shaheen Baig – The Third Day (Sky Atlantic)	**Nick Fry, Steve Speed, James Evans, Hugh Dwan – Formula 1: Drive to Survive (Netflix)**; Kate Hopkins, Tim Owens, Graham Wild, Paul Ackerman, Tom Mercer – Earth At Night In Color (Apple TV+); Richard Kondal, Alex Outhwaite, Adrian Sandu – Hitsville: The Making of Motown (Sky Documentaries); Sound Team – Springwatch 2020 (BBC Two)
Best Sound: Fiction	Best Special, Visual and Graphic Effects
**Jon Thomas, Gareth Bull, James Ridgway, Dillon Bennett, Eilam Hoffman – His Dark Materials (BBC One)**; Niall O'Sullivan, Steve Fanagan, Niall Brady – Normal People (BBC Three); Paul Cotterell, James Harrison, Ronald Bailey, Lewis Morison – Small Axe (BBC One); Sound Team – The Crown (Netflix)	**Russell Dodgson, James Whitlam, Jean-Clement Soret, Robert Harrington, Dan May, Brian Fisher – His Dark Materials (BBC One)**; Ben Turner, Reece Ewing, Chris Reynolds, Asa Shoul, Framestore, Untold Studios – The Crown (Netflix); Michael Illingworth, Oliver Milburn, Danny Hargreaves, Oliver Ogneux, Laura Usaite, Pedrom Dadgostar – War of the Worlds (FOX); Milk Visual Effects, DNEG TV, Freefolk, Goodbye Kansas Studios, Greg Fisher, Dave Houghton – Cursed (Netflix)
Best Titles and Graphic Identity	Best Writer: Comedy
**Nic Benns and Miki Kato – Fear City: New York vs the Mafia (Netflix)**; Matt Curtis – Devs (BBC Two); Peter Anderson Studio – Dracula (BBC One); Peter Anderson Studio – Roald & Beatrix: The Tail of the Curious Mouse (Sky One)	**Sophie Willan – Alma's Not Normal (BBC Two)**; Charlie Brooker – Charlie Brooker's Antiviral Wipe (BBC Two); Daisy May Cooper and Charlie Cooper – This Country (BBC Three); Writing Team – Ghosts (BBC One)
Best Writer: Drama
**Michaela Coel – I May Destroy You (BBC One)**; Alastair Siddons and Steve McQueen – Small Axe (BBC One); Lucy Kirkwood – Adult Material (Channel 4); Lucy Prebble – I Hate Suzie (Sky Atlantic)

== See also ==
- 2021 British Academy Television Awards
