= Paul Chahidi =

British actor (born 1969)

- Born: Giv Paul Khatib-Chahidi; 22 August 1969 (age 57)
- Education: Trinity College, Cambridge; Royal Central School of Speech and Drama
- Occupation: Actor

Giv Paul Khatib-Chahidi (born 22 August 1969), known professionally as Paul Chahidi (Persian: پل شهیدی), is an Iranian-born British actor. He has won a Theatre World Award and a Clarence Derwent Award along with having Tony and Olivier nominations.

== Early life ==
Paul Chahidi was born in Iran to an Iranian father and a British mother. His parents met while they were students studying at the Sorbonne in Paris. Chahidi was raised in Iran until the family left during the Iranian Revolution in 1979 and settled in the United Kingdom. Growing up in a mixed-heritage home — his Iranian father was raised as a Muslim, but was later “verging on atheist”; his English mother became a Roman Catholic — he experienced both Catholic and Anglican schools. Chahidi grew up in Summertown, Oxford and attended the Dragon School and Winchester College. He went on to graduate with a masters in Arabic and Persian from Trinity College, Cambridge. He went on to train as an actor at the Royal Central School of Speech and Drama.

== Career ==
Chahidi is an associate artist of the Royal Shakespeare Company. He appeared at Shakespeare's Globe and on Broadway in all-male productions of Twelfth Night and Richard III. He was nominated for both an Olivier award and a Tony Award and won a Theatre World Award and Clarence Derwent Award for his portrayal of Maria in Twelfth Night, where he appeared alongside Mark Rylance's Olivia in 2013. He played defence minister Nikolai Bulganin in Armando Iannucci's 2017 historical comedy The Death of Stalin.

He had a recurring role in the BBC Three television comedy series This Country (2017–2020), in which he played the Rev. Francis Seaton, a vicar who tries to help the characters created and played by siblings Charlie Cooper and Daisy May Cooper. For this role, he was nominated for the Royal Television Society Award for best Comedy Performance (Male).

== Filmography ==
Year	Title	Role	Notes
1995	Bliss	Mike	Episode: "In Memoriam"
1996	Stella Does Tricks	Chris	
1999	Murder Most Horrid	Hitman	Episode: "Whoopi Stone"
1999	The Blonde Bombshell	Reporter	Episode 2
1999	Notting Hill	Loud Man in Restaurant	
2000	Peak Practice	Pharmacist	Episode: "Turning Tides"
2001	Murder in Mind	Mike Stott	Episode: "Teacher"
2004	The Libertine	Barrillon	
2004	Blackpool	Registrar	Episode 6
2006	Venus	Period Film Director	
2006	Fear of Fanny	Director	Television film
2007	Oliver Twist	The Quack	2 episodes
2008	Filth: The Mary Whitehouse Story	Sir Barnett Cocks	Television film
2009-2010	Ladies of Letters	Anthony	11 episodes
2009, 2012-2013	Casualty	Doug/Mehmet Aslan	5 episodes
2009	The Day of the Triffids (2009 TV series)	Vronsky	2 episodes
2010	Hustle	Tamir Abu-Alsaud	Episode: "And This Little Piggy Had Money"
2010	National Theatre Live: Nation	Cox	
2011	Holy Flying Circus	Harry Balls/News Vendor	Television film
2011-2012	The Hour	Ron	8 episodes
2013	What Remains	Anthony	Episode 1
2013	Globe on Screen: Twelfth Night	Maria	
2013	The Tunnel	Pathologist	Series 1, Episode 6
2013	Him & Her	Nicholas	2 episodes
2014	The Voices	Dennis Kowalski	
2015	The Vote	Howard Roberts	Live stage broadcast
2015	And Then There Were None	Isaac Morris	2 episodes
2016	National Theatre Live: As You Like It	Jacques	
2016	Hot Property	Headmaster	
2016	Boyka: Undisputed	Kiril	
2017	Maigret	Michonnet	Episode: "Night at the Crossroads"
2017	National Theatre Live: Salome	Herod	
2017	The Death of Stalin	Nikolai Bulganin	
2017–2020	This Country	Rev. Francis Seaton	17 episodes
2018	Christopher Robin	Cecil Hungerford	
2019	Warren	Clairevoyant	Episode: "The Pond"
2019, 2025, 2026	Good Omens	Sandalphon	5 episodes
2019	Britannia	Domitius	8 episodes
2019	A Christmas Carol	Spirit/Business Man	2 episodes
2020	Soulmates	Pastor Roberts	Episode: "Break on Through"
2021	Too Close	Phil Cook	Episode 1
2021-2024	Chad	Hamid Amani	18 episodes
2022	The Other Half	Farhad	Television pilot
2022	See How They Run	Fellowes	
2022	The Serpent Queen	Charles de Bourbon	5 episodes
2022	National Theatre at Home: Phaedra	Hugo	
2022	Midsomer Murders	Gabriel Arnson	Episode: "A Grain of Truth"
2023	Wicked Little Letters	Chief Constable Spedding	
2023	Good Boy	Doctor	Short film
2024	Ludwig	Adrian Tate	Series 1, Episode 3
2026	The Night Manager	Basil Karapetian	5 episodes
2026	Ponies	Alan Salek	5 episodes
2026	Can You Keep a Secret?	Clive Trunge	5 episodes
2026	Ladies First	Harry Guinness	Upcoming
2026	The Witness	Professor Paul Britton	Upcoming
2027	A Knight of the Seven Kingdoms	Septon Sefton	Season 2

== Other work ==
Paul Chahidi has appeared on a number of popular podcasts, including The QuaranTea Break Podcast with Simon Ward, and Seven Stages the podcast from The Stage.
