= Am I Being Unreasonable? =

British television series

- Genre: Comedy; Thriller
- Created by: Daisy May Cooper; Selin Hizli
- Written by: Daisy May Cooper; Selin Hizli
- Directed by: Jonny Campbell; Emily McDonald
- Starring: Daisy May Cooper; Selin Hizli
- Country of origin: United Kingdom
- Original language: English
- No. of series: 2
- No. of episodes: 12

Production
- Executive producers: Selin Hizli; Daisy May Cooper; Jack Thorne; Shane Allen; Jonny Campbell; Faith Penhale; Kate Daughton; Tanya Qureshi
- Producer: Pippa Brown
- Production companies: Boffola Pictures; Lookout Point

Original release
- Network: BBC One
- Release: 23 September 2022 – present

Am I Being Unreasonable? is a British comedy-thriller television series produced by Boffola Pictures and Lookout Point and written by, and starring Daisy May Cooper and Selin Hizli. The series was broadcast on BBC One in the United Kingdom from 26 September 2022. The series premiered in the United States on Hulu on 11 April 2023. A second series was commissioned by the BBC in October 2022. A third and final series was commissioned in May 2026.

== Synopsis ==
Nic is a mum stuck in a depressing marriage grieving a loss she cannot share with anyone. Jen arrives in Nic's life as a kindred spirit and school mum, but both are concealing secrets.

== Cast and characters ==
- Daisy May Cooper as Nic
- Selin Hizli as Jen
- Lenny Rush as Ollie
- Dustin Demri-Burns as Dan
- Amanda Wilkin as Suzie
- David Fynn as Alex
- Juliet Cowan as Viv
- Jessica Hynes as Becca
- Samuel Bottomley as Boy
- Yohanna Ephrem as Girl
- Ruben Catt (series 1) and Ankido Hussen (series 2) as Harry
- Karla Crome as Lucy
- Marek Larwood as Kev
- Noah Carr-Kingsnorth as Dennon
- Annie Haworth as Kelly
- Helen Bauer as Lauren
- Georgie Glen as Mrs Baggott
- Beatie Edney as Carol
- Olisa Odele as Jesus
- Denise Black as Daphne (series 2)
- Chelsea Peretti as Savannah (series 2)

== Episodes ==
=== Series 1 (2022) ===
No.	Title	Directed by	Written by	BBC One airdate	UK viewers (millions)
1	"Episode One"	Jonny Campbell	Daisy May Cooper & Selin Hizli	23 September 2022	2.18
Some time ago, Alex, Nic's brother-in-law, expressed his love for Nic as they got on a train. His coat got stuck in the automatic door, killing him when another train passed by. In the present day, Nic is in an unfulfilling marriage with her husband Dan. She is standoffish towards the other school mums, but she strikes up a friendship with the new mum Jen. Jen invites herself to Nic’s house to celebrate their friendship and they get drunk together. Nic confesses to Jen that she had a long and passionate affair with Alex while she was married to Dan. Unbeknownst to Nic, Jen has recorded their conversation.
2	"Episode Two"	Jonny Campbell	Daisy May Cooper & Selin Hizli	30 September 2022	<(2.76)
Nic wakes up hungover and is paranoid over what she told Jen in her inebriated state, but Jen reassures her that she can tell her anything. Suzie, Alex's wife, arrives to plan Alex’s memorial with Dan. Nic wants to help Suzie, but she tells her that the way Nic hung out with Alex made her uncomfortable. Dan rewatched his wedding video on the TV, tearing up when he sees his brother Alex giving the speech. The next day Jen arrives at her house for a playdate, but Nic has to leaves to pick up her pet from a local veterinary clinic. When she comes back, she is surprised to see the wedding video on the TV. She has a flashback to the day of Nic’s wedding to Dan, where Alex admitted his love for Nic. They began the affair after the ceremony.
3	"Episode Three"	Jonny Campbell	Daisy May Cooper & Selin Hizli	7 October 2022	<(2.87)
Nic realises that her coat is missing and yells at Jen when she sees her wearing her coat. She later remembers that her coat was simply at the dry cleaners and goes to Jen’s house to apologize to her. However, at the house she only finds an old woman who says that she lives in the house alone. Nic shows her a picture of Jen, but the old woman says that it is not a picture of Jen but of Katya. At the same time, Jen visits Nic’s house and asks Dan why Nic is upset with her. Nic returns home and asks Jen about her real identity, but Jen receives a phone call and leaves urgently.
4	"Episode Four"	Jonny Campbell	Daisy May Cooper & Selin Hizli	14 October 2022	<(2.82)
The episode follows events from the previous episodes from Jen’s perspective. She had lost her job and had to move to a new town with her son. She works as a housecleaner for an old woman who confuses her for the old cleaner, Katya. At her son’s first day of school she meets Nic, and is grateful when she helps her. She looks her up online to see pictures of her with Dan, and is surprised to find Dan on Tinder. She records the evidence and calls Dan out for cheating. She invites herself to Nic's house to tell her about Dan, but is surprised when Nic tells her of her affair with Alex. Still, she admires Nic, buying the same coat as her and watching her wedding video.
5	"Episode Five"	Jonny Campbell	Daisy May Cooper & Selin Hizli	21 October 2022	<(3.09)
Nic and Dan are angry at Jen for leaving so suddenly. Jen returns and apologizes to Nic. Nic forces her to explain her whole backstory, and Jen says that she was called by her friend who is in an abusive relationship. Nic and Dan prepare for Alex’s memorial. Dan is frustrated to see that Nic had brought Jen with her and makes her choose between him or Jen. Nic hesitates, and Dan leaves angrily. Nic cries in front of Alex’s memorial, and Jen comforts her.
6	"Episode Six"	Jonny Campbell	Daisy May Cooper & Selin Hizli	28 October 2022	<(2.95)
A flashback shows Nic and Dan hosting dinner for Alex and his wife Suzie. Alex is cheating on Suzie with Nic, and Dan brags to Alex that he is using Tinder to cheat on Nic. Nic is angry to learn that Alex is trying for a baby with Suzie, but he reassures her that she is the only one he loves. In the present, at Alex’s memorial, Dan and Suzie each tell Nic of their ire for her. When Nic is called to speak about Alex, she remembers what really happened on the day of his death: Alex had insulted Nic and wanted to end the affair, and in anger, Nic pulled his coat so it would get stuck in the train doors, Nic then fails to activate the emergency stop.

=== Series 2 (2025) ===
No.	Title	Directed by	Written by	BBC One airdate	UK viewers (millions)
1	"Episode One"	Emily McDonald	Daisy May Cooper & Selin Hizli	5 February 2025	<(2.79)
2	"Episode Two"	Emily McDonald	Daisy May Cooper & Selin Hizli	12 February 2025	<(2.56)
3	"Episode Three"	Emily McDonald	Daisy May Cooper & Selin Hizli	19 February 2025	<(2.70)
4	"Episode Four"	Emily McDonald	Daisy May Cooper & Selin Hizli	26 February 2025	<(2.64)
5	"Episode Five"	Emily McDonald	Daisy May Cooper & Selin Hizli	5 March 2025	<(2.58)
6	"Episode Six"	Emily McDonald	Daisy May Cooper & Selin Hizli	12 March 2025	<(2.51)

== Production ==
The show's title is borrowed from the Mumsnet message board of which Cooper told the Times "If you post anything on AIBU about whether you should end your marriage, they all scream 'Leave the bastard,' even if all he's done is sing over the Coronation Street theme tune." Cooper and Hizli knew each other from drama school. The show was partly improvised.

Filming of the first series took place in 2021 at The Bottle Yard Studios in Bristol and on location in Gloucestershire. Principal photography finished in February 2022. The producer is Pippa Brown and the director is Jonny Campbell. The production companies are Boffola Pictures and Lookout Point. Executive producers are Jack Thorne, Shane Allen, Jonny Campbell, Daisy May Cooper, Kate Daughton, and Selin Hizli.

A second series was commissioned by the BBC in October 2022. Filming on the second series took place in October 2024. Guest appearances in series two include Chelsea Peretti, Tom Davis, Denise Black, Jamali Maddix, Kojey Radical, and Charlie Cooper.

Filming was under way for the third and final series in June 2026, with the series due to be broadcast later in the year.

== Broadcast ==
The show was first broadcast on BBC One on 23 September 2022, with all episodes being made available in the UK on the BBC iPlayer on the same day. BBC Studios have international distribution rights. The series was originally meant to begin a week earlier, but was delayed, as were many other scheduled programmes, because of the death of Queen Elizabeth II and the resulting period of mourning. The series premiered in the United States on Hulu on 11 April 2023.

The second series premiered in the UK on 5 February 2025 on BBC One and BBC iPlayer.

== Awards ==
On 9 January 2023 the show received a nomination at the Comedy.co.uk Awards 2022 in the Best Comedy Drama Series category. On 23 January 2023 Cooper received a nomination for Outstanding Comedy Actress at the National Comedy Awards 2023, while Rush received a breakthrough award.

On 29 March 2023 the series won three awards at the Royal Television Society Programme Awards. Lenny Rush won the Breakthrough Award, and Performance (Male) Award, and Daisy May Cooper won the Comedy Performance (Female). The show itself was nominated for the Comedy Drama Award at the same ceremony.

Cooper was nominated for best female performance in a comedy programme, Rush for best male performance in a comedy programme, and the programme for best scripted comedy at the British Academy Television Awards, announced on 22 March 2023.

Jamie Pearson and Helena Evans were nominated in the Best Editing - Entertainment and Comedy category at the 2023 Royal Television Society Craft & Design Awards.

Year	Award	Category	Nominee(s)	Result	Ref.
2023	Royal Television Society Programme Awards	Breakthrough Award	Lenny Rush	Won	
2023	Royal Television Society Programme Awards	Performance (Male)	Lenny Rush	Won	
2023	Royal Television Society Programme Awards	Comedy Performance (Female)	Daisy May Cooper	Won	
2023	Royal Television Society Programme Awards	Comedy Drama	Am I Being Unreasonable?	Nominated	
2023	British Academy Television Awards	Female Performance In A Comedy Programme	Daisy May Cooper	Nominated	
2023	British Academy Television Awards	Best Scripted Comedy	Daisy May Cooper, Selin Hizli, Jonny Campbell, Pippa Brown, Jack Thorne	Nominated	
2023	British Academy Television Awards	Male Performance In A Comedy Programme	Lenny Rush	Won	
2023	British Academy Television Craft Awards	Best Scripted Casting	Julie Harkin	Nominated	
2026	British Academy Television Awards	Best Male Comedy Performance	Lenny Rush	Nominated	

== See also ==
- R/AmItheAsshole
