= British Academy Television Award for Best Female Comedy Performance =

Annual award

British Academy Television Award
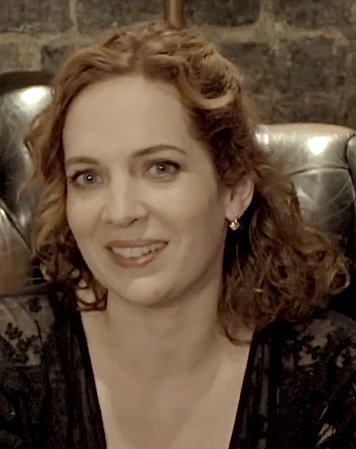
- 2026 recipient: Katherine Parkinson
- Country: United Kingdom
- Presented by: British Academy of Film and Television Arts
- First award: 2009 (presented in 2010)
- Currently held by: Katherine Parkinson for Here We Go (2026)

Highlights
- Most wins: Jessica Hynes; Katherine Parkinson (both 2)
- Website: www.bafta.org

The British Academy Television Award for Best Female Comedy Performance was instituted in 2009. It is awarded by the British Academy of Film and Television Arts (BAFTA), a British organisation that hosts annual awards shows for film, television, children's film and television, and interactive media.

Since 2009 (presented in 2010), the British Academy Television Awards has presented two awards for comedy performance, the BAFTA TV Award for Best Female Comedy Performance and the BAFTA TV Award for Best Male Comedy Performance. Before 2009 there was one award for Best Comedy Performance. Jessica Hynes and Katherine Parkinson are the only two actresses who has received this award more than once, with two wins for each of them.

== Winners and nominees ==
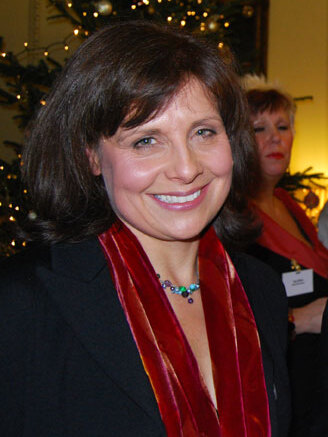
Rebecca Front won for The Thick of It in 2010.

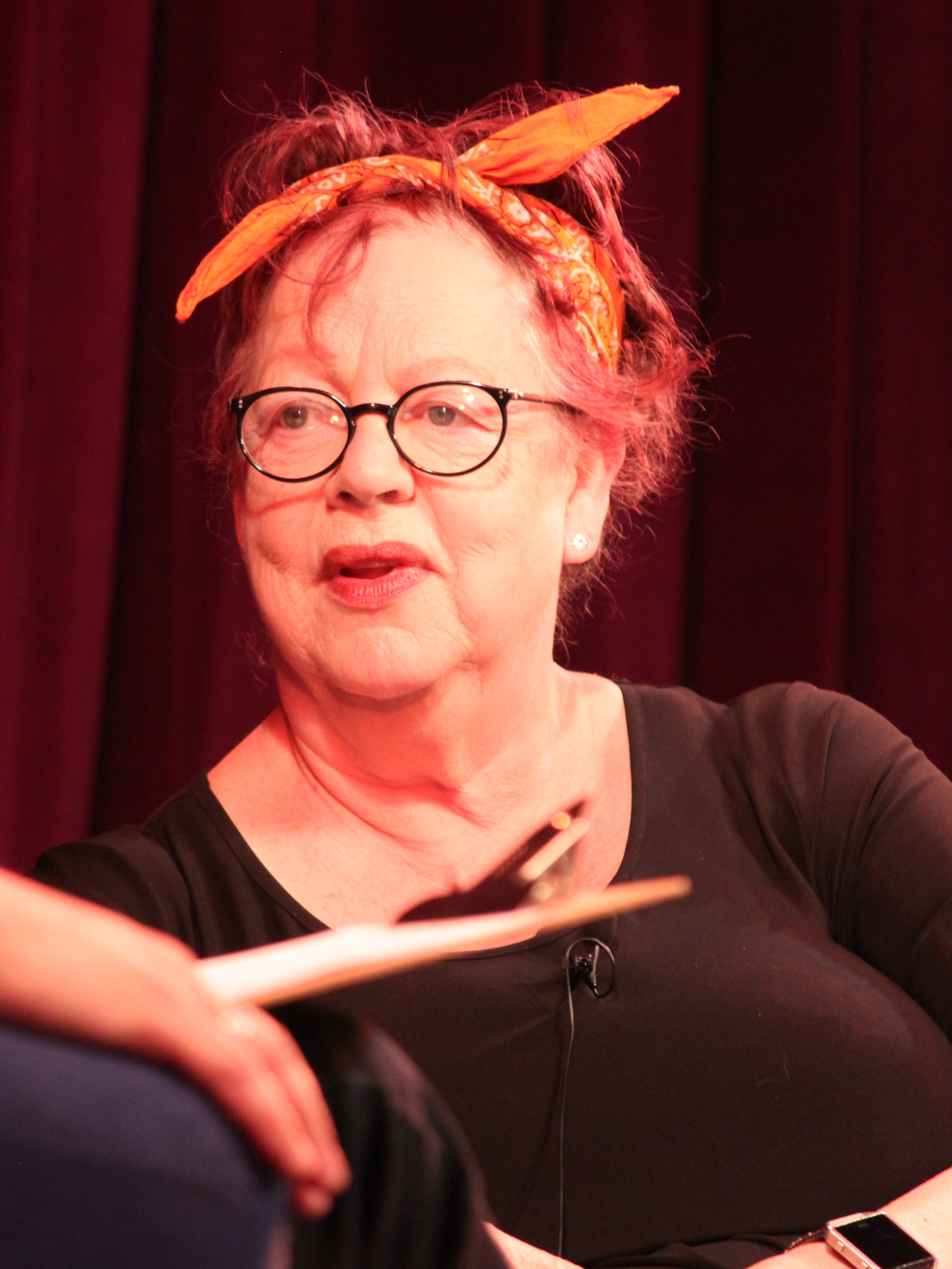
Jo Brand won in 2011 for Getting On.

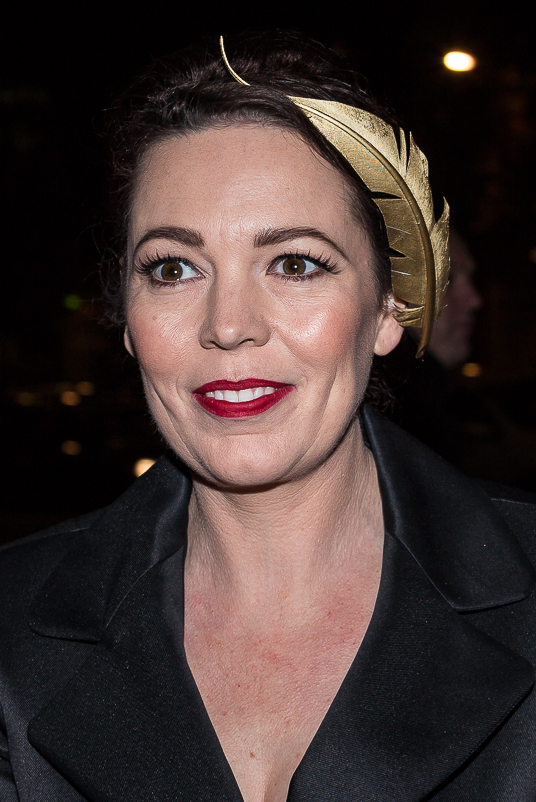
Olivia Colman won for Twenty Twelve in 2013.

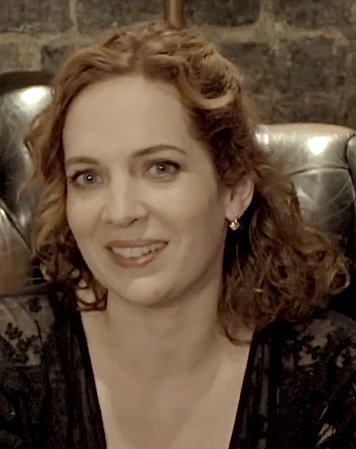
Katherine Parkinson won for The IT Crowd in 2014.

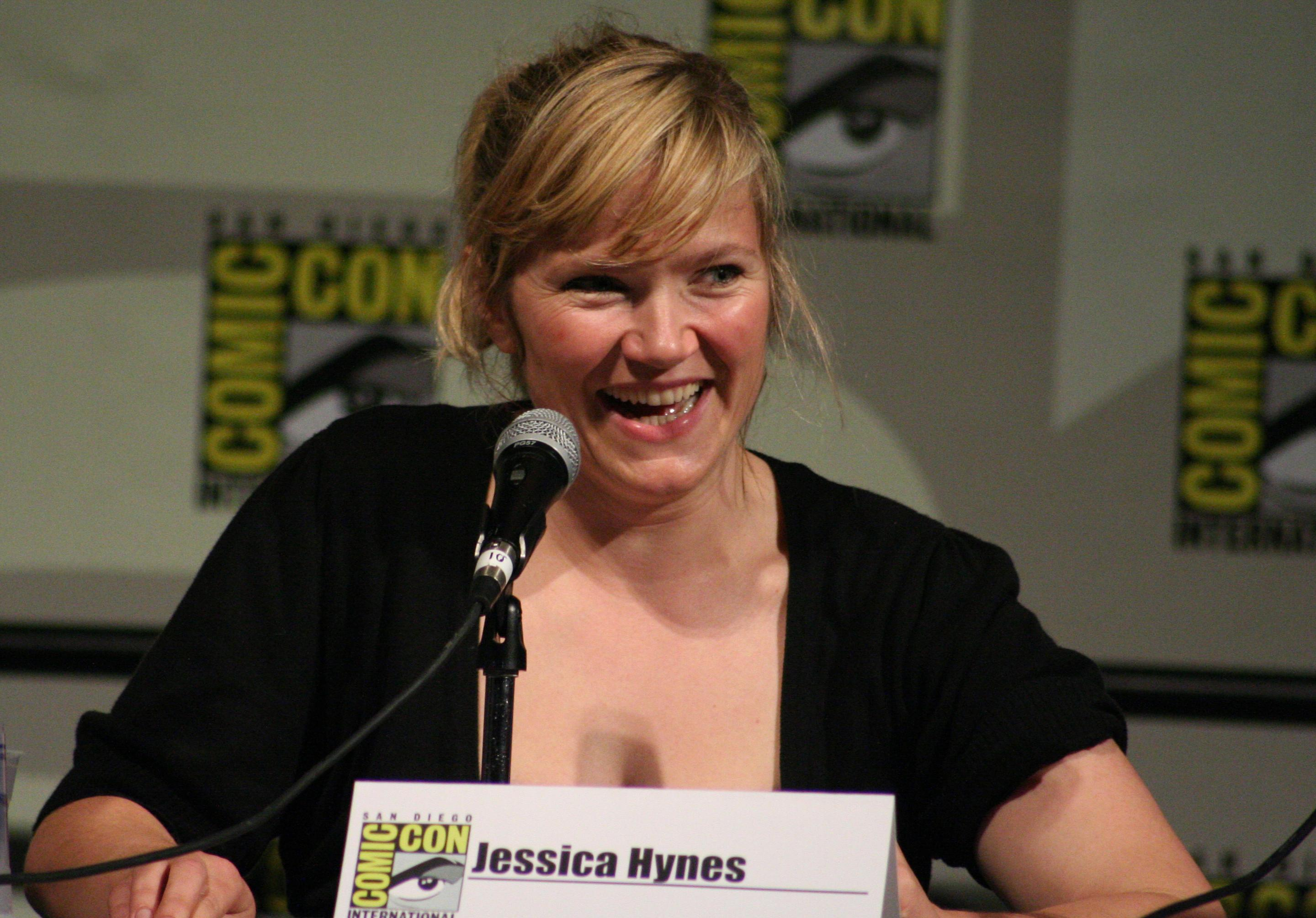
Jessica Hynes has won this award twice, for W1A (2015) and There She Goes (2019).

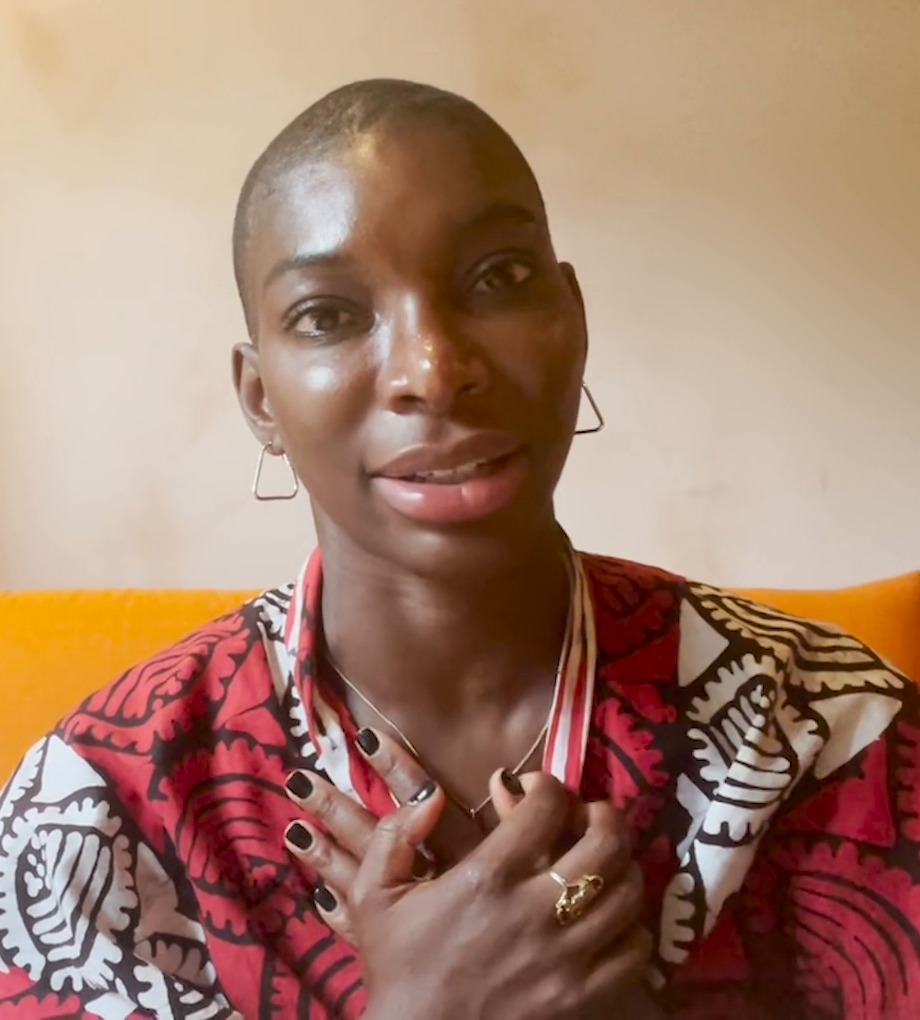
Michaela Coel won for Chewing Gum in 2016.

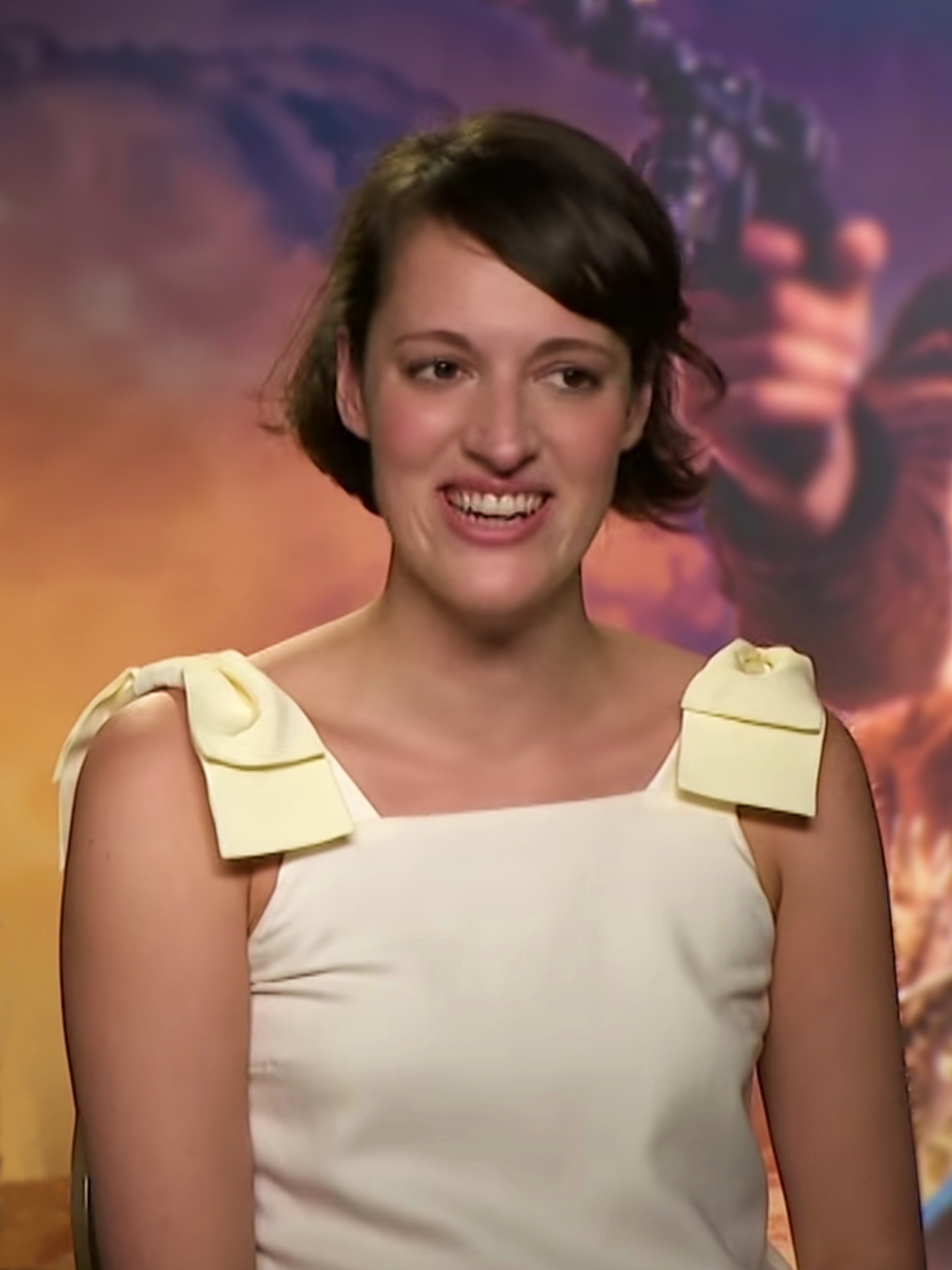
Phoebe Waller-Bridge won for Fleabag in 2017.

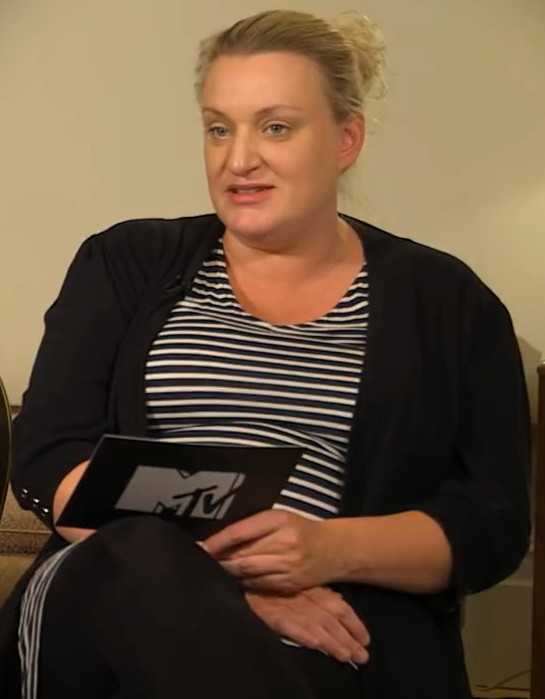
Daisy May Cooper won for This Country in 2018.

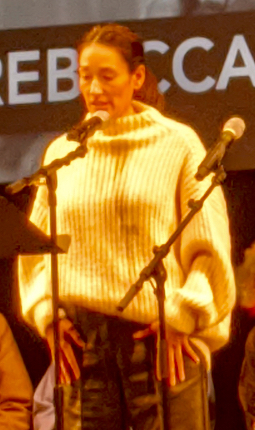
Sian Clifford won for Fleabag in 2020.

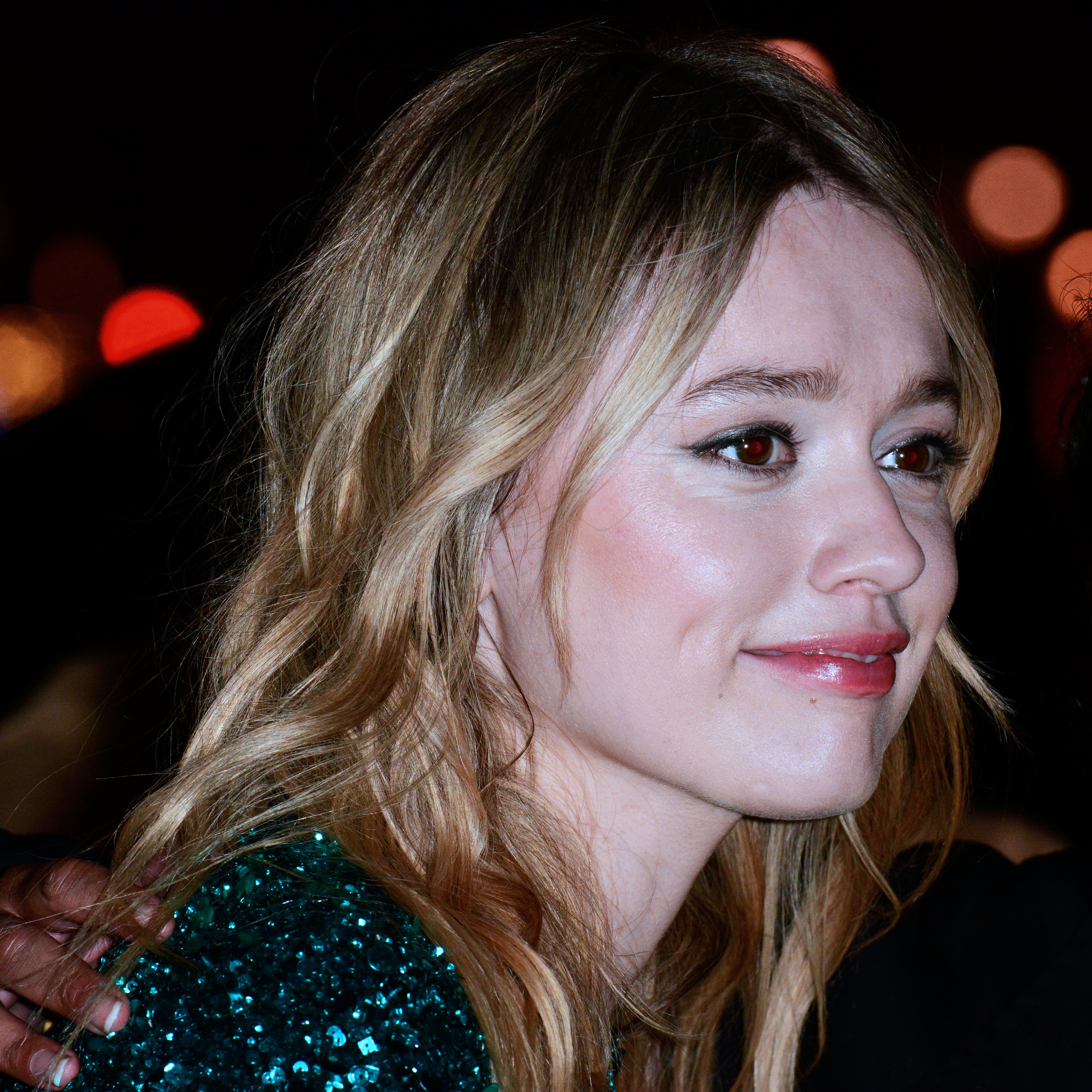
Aimee Lou Wood won for Sex Education in 2021.

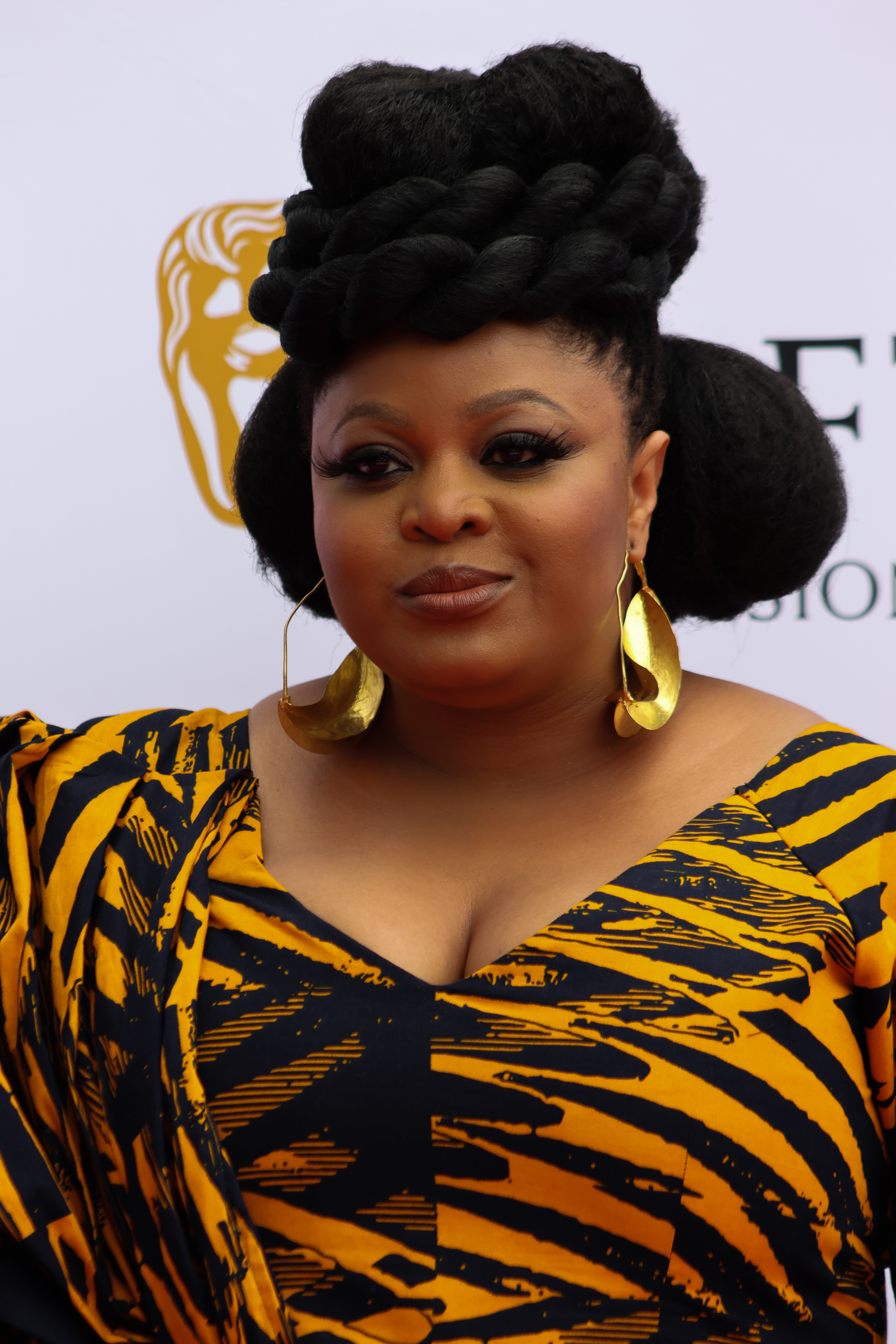
Gbemisola Ikumelo won for Black Ops in 2024.

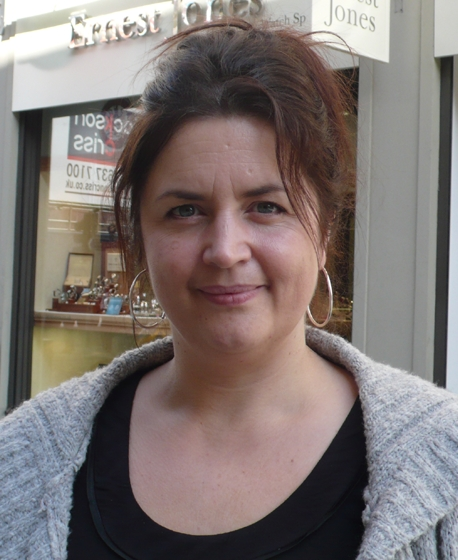
Ruth Jones won for Gavin & Stacey: The Finale in 2025.

=== 2010s ===
| Year | Actress | Work | Character | Network |
|---|---|---|---|---|
2010 (56th)
| 2010 (56th) | Rebecca Front | The Thick of It | Rt Hon Nicola Murray MP | BBC Two |
| 2010 (56th) | Jo Brand | Getting On | Kim Wilde | BBC Four |
| 2010 (56th) | Joanna Scanlan | Getting On | Denise "Den" Flixter | BBC Four |
| 2010 (56th) | Miranda Hart | Miranda | Miranda | BBC Two |
2011 (57th)
| 2011 (57th) | Jo Brand | Getting On | Kim Wilde | BBC Four |
| 2011 (57th) | Dawn French | Roger & Val Have Just Got In | Val Stephenson | BBC Two |
| 2011 (57th) | Katherine Parkinson | The IT Crowd | Jen Barber | Channel 4 |
| 2011 (57th) | Miranda Hart | Miranda | Miranda | BBC One |
2012 (58th)
| 2012 (58th) | Jennifer Saunders | Absolutely Fabulous | Edina Monsoon | BBC One |
| 2012 (58th) | Olivia Colman | Twenty Twelve | Sally Owen | BBC Four |
| 2012 (58th) | Tamsin Greig | Friday Night Dinner | Jackie Goodman | Channel 4 |
| 2012 (58th) | Ruth Jones | Stella | Stella Morris | Sky One |
2013 (59th)
| 2013 (59th) | Olivia Colman | Twenty Twelve | Sally Owen | BBC Two |
| 2013 (59th) | Julia Davis | Hunderby | Dorothy | Sky Atlantic |
| 2013 (59th) | Miranda Hart | Miranda | Miranda | BBC One |
| 2013 (59th) | Jessica Hynes | Twenty Twelve | Siobhan Sharpe | BBC Two |
2014 (60th)
| 2014 (60th) | Katherine Parkinson | The IT Crowd | Jen Barber | Channel 4 |
| 2014 (60th) | Frances de la Tour | Vicious | Violet Crosby | ITV |
| 2014 (60th) | Kerry Howard | Him & Her: The Wedding | Laura Williams | BBC Three |
| 2014 (60th) | Doon Mackichan | Plebs | Flavia | ITV2 |
2015 (61st)
| 2015 (61st) | Jessica Hynes | W1A | Siobhan Sharpe | BBC Two |
| 2015 (61st) | Catherine Tate | Catherine Tate's Nan | Joanie Taylor | BBC One |
| 2015 (61st) | Olivia Colman | Rev. | Alex Smallbone | BBC Two |
| 2015 (61st) | Tamsin Greig | Episodes | Beverly Lincoln | BBC Two |
2016 (62nd)
| 2016 (62nd) | Michaela Coel | Chewing Gum | Tracey Gordon | E4 |
| 2016 (62nd) | Miranda Hart | Miranda | Miranda | BBC One |
| 2016 (62nd) | Sian Gibson | Peter Kay's Car Share | Kayleigh Kitson | BBC One |
| 2016 (62nd) | Sharon Horgan | Catastrophe | Sharon Morris | Channel 4 |
2017 (63rd)
| 2017 (63rd) | Phoebe Waller-Bridge | Fleabag | Fleabag | BBC Three |
| 2017 (63rd) | Lesley Manville | Mum | Cathy Bradshaw | BBC Two |
| 2017 (63rd) | Diane Morgan | Cunk on Shakespeare | Philomena Cunk | BBC Two |
| 2017 (63rd) | Olivia Colman | Fleabag | Godmother | BBC Three |
2018 (64th)
| 2018 (64th) | Daisy May Cooper | This Country | Kerry Mucklowe | BBC Three |
| 2018 (64th) | Anna Maxwell Martin | Motherland | Julia | BBC Two |
| 2018 (64th) | Sian Gibson | Peter Kay's Car Share | Kayleigh Kitson | BBC One |
| 2018 (64th) | Sharon Horgan | Catastrophe | Sharon Morris | Channel 4 |
2019 (65th)
| 2019 (65th) | Jessica Hynes | There She Goes | Emily Yates | BBC Four |
| 2019 (65th) | Daisy May Cooper | This Country | Kerry Mucklowe | BBC Three |
| 2019 (65th) | Julia Davis | Sally4Ever | Emma | Sky Atlantic |
| 2019 (65th) | Lesley Manville | Mum | Cathy Bradshaw | BBC Two |

=== 2020s ===
| Year | Actress | Work | Character | Network |
|---|---|---|---|---|
2020 (66th)
| 2020 (66th) | Sian Clifford | Fleabag | Claire | BBC Three |
| 2020 (66th) | Sarah Kendall | Frayed | Sammy Cooper | Sky One |
| 2020 (66th) | Gbemisola Ikumelo | Famalam | Various Characters | BBC Three |
| 2020 (66th) | Phoebe Waller-Bridge | Fleabag | Fleabag | BBC Three |
2021 (67th)
| 2021 (67th) | Aimee Lou Wood | Sex Education | Aimee Gibbs | Netflix |
| 2021 (67th) | Daisy Haggard | Breeders | Ally Worsley | Sky One |
| 2021 (67th) | Emma Mackey | Sex Education | Maeve Wiley | Netflix |
| 2021 (67th) | Daisy May Cooper | This Country | Kerry Mucklowe | BBC Three |
| 2021 (67th) | Gbemisola Ikumelo | Famalam | Various Characters | BBC Three |
| 2021 (67th) | Mae Martin | Feel Good | Mae | Channel 4 |
2022 (68th)
| 2022 (68th) | Sophie Willan | Alma's Not Normal | Alma Nuthall | BBC Two |
| 2022 (68th) | Aimee Lou Wood | Sex Education | Aimee Gibbs | Netflix |
| 2022 (68th) | Aisling Bea | This Way Up | Áine | Channel 4 |
| 2022 (68th) | Anjana Vasan | We Are Lady Parts | Amina | Channel 4 |
| 2022 (68th) | Natasia Demetriou | Stath Lets Flats | Sophie | Channel 4 |
| 2022 (68th) | Rose Matafeo | Starstruck | Jessie | BBC Three |
2023 (69th)
| 2023 (69th) | Siobhán McSweeney | Derry Girls | Sister George Michael | Channel 4 |
| 2023 (69th) | Lucy Beaumont | Meet the Richardsons | Lucy | Dave |
| 2023 (69th) | Daisy May Cooper | Am I Being Unreasonable? | Nic | BBC One |
| 2023 (69th) | Taj Atwal | Hullraisers | Rana | Channel 4 |
| 2023 (69th) | Diane Morgan | Cunk on Earth | Philomena Cunk | BBC Two |
| 2023 (69th) | Natasia Demetriou | Ellie and Natasia | Various characters | BBC Three |
2024 (70th)
| 2024 (70th) | Gbemisola Ikumelo | Black Ops | Dom | BBC One |
| 2024 (70th) | Bridget Christie | The Change | Linda | Channel 4 |
| 2024 (70th) | Máiréad Tyers | Extraordinary | Jen | Disney+ |
| 2024 (70th) | Sofia Oxenham | Extraordinary | Carrie | Disney+ |
| 2024 (70th) | Roisin Gallagher | The Lovers | Janet | Sky Atlantic |
| 2024 (70th) | Taj Atwal | Hullraisers | Rana | Channel 4 |
| 2025 (71st) | Ruth Jones | Gavin & Stacey: The Finale | Nessa Jenkins | BBC One |
| 2025 (71st) | Anjana Vasan | We Are Lady Parts | Amina | Channel 4 |
| 2025 (71st) | Kate O'Flynn | Everyone Else Burns | Fiona Lewis | Channel 4 |
| 2025 (71st) | Nicola Coughlan | Big Mood | Maggie | Channel 4 |
| 2025 (71st) | Lolly Adefope | The Franchise | Dagmara "Dag" Nwaeze | Sky Comedy |
| 2025 (71st) | Sophie Willan | Alma's Not Normal | Alma Nuthall | BBC Two |
| 2026 (72nd) | Katherine Parkinson | Here We Go | Rachel Jessop | BBC One |
| 2026 (72nd) | Philippa Dunne | Amandaland | Anne Flynn | BBC One |
| 2026 (72nd) | Lucy Punch | Amandaland | Amanda Hughes | BBC One |
| 2026 (72nd) | Jennifer Saunders | Amandaland | Aunt Joan | BBC One |
| 2026 (72nd) | Rosie Jones | Pushers | Emily Dawkins | Channel 4 |
| 2026 (72nd) | Diane Morgan | Mandy | Mandy Carter | BBC Two |

== Superlatives ==
| Record | Actress | Programme | Age (in years) |
|---|---|---|---|
| Oldest winner | Jo Brand | Getting On | 53 |
| Oldest nominee | Frances de la Tour | Vicious | 69 |
| Youngest winner | Aimee Lou Wood | Sex Education | 26 |
| Youngest nominee | Emma Mackey | Sex Education | 24 |

== Actresses with multiple wins and nominations ==
=== Multiple wins ===
The following people have won the British Academy Television Award for Best Female Comedy Performance multiple times:

2 wins

- Jessica Hynes
- Katherine Parkinson

=== Multiple nominations ===
The following people have been nominated for the British Academy Television Award for Best Female Comedy Performance multiple times:

4 nominations

- Olivia Colman
- Miranda Hart
- Daisy May Cooper

3 nominations

- Jessica Hynes
- Gbemisola Ikumelo
- Diane Morgan
- Katherine Parkinson

2 nominations

- Taj Atwal
- Jo Brand
- Julia Davis
- Natasia Demetriou
- Sian Gibson
- Tamsin Greig
- Sharon Horgan
- Ruth Jones
- Lesley Manville
- Jennifer Saunders
- Anjana Vasan
- Phoebe Waller-Bridge
- Sophie Willan
- Aimee Lou Wood

== Programmes with multiple wins and nominations ==
=== Multiple wins ===
2 wins

- Fleabag

=== Multiple nominations ===
4 nominations

- Fleabag
- Miranda

3 nominations

- Amandaland
- Getting On
- Sex Education
- This Country
- Twenty Twelve

2 nominations

- Alma's Not Normal
- Catastrophe
- Extraordinary
- Famalam
- Hullraisers
- The IT Crowd
- Mum
- Peter Kay's Car Share
- We Are Lady Parts
