= Trevor Cooper =

English actor (born 1953)

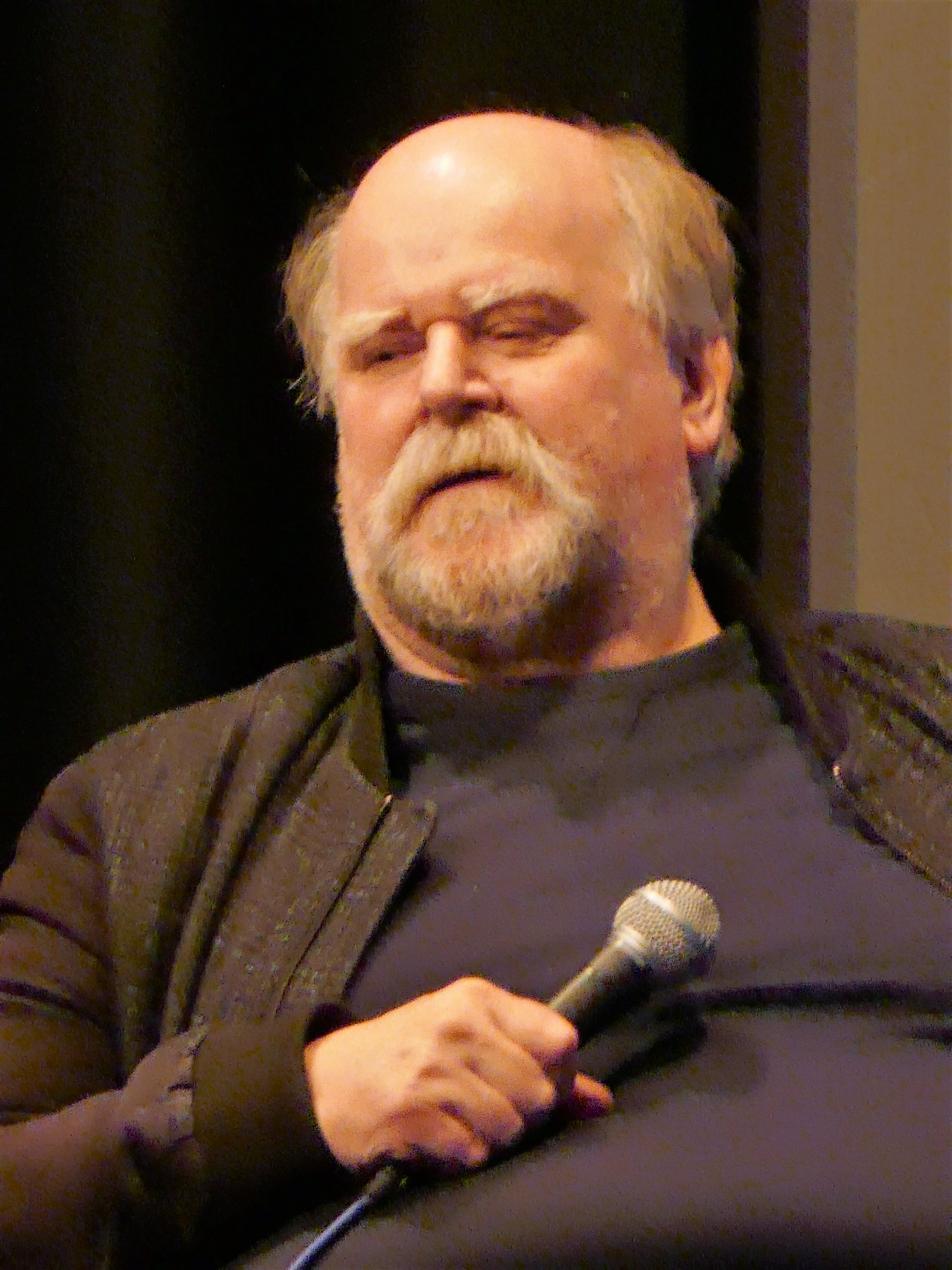
- Cooper in 2023
- Born: 21 September 1953 (age 73); London, England
- Education: Drama Studio London
- Occupation: Actor
- Years active: 1980–present
- Relatives: Daisy May Cooper (niece); Charlie Cooper (nephew); Mathew Baynton (first cousin once removed)

Trevor Cooper (born 21 September 1953) is an English actor.

== Background ==
Born 21 September 1953, Cooper studied law at Kingston Polytechnic and graduated with a master's degree in law from the University of Warwick. He taught for two years at London South Bank University before becoming an actor training at the Drama Studio London. He is known for portraying, in his words, "bald fat blokes".

== Career ==
Having won a Carleton Hobbs Award in 1979, Cooper had his first lead role in a 1980 radio production of The File on Leo Kaplan. Cooper appeared in the films The Whistle Blower and The Ruby in the Smoke. He is also known for playing Colin Devis on the television series Star Cops and Gurth in the 1997 BBC dramatisation of Ivanhoe. His other television roles include appearances in A Very Peculiar Practice, The Singing Detective, The Woman in Black, Our Friends in the North, Outnumbered, Ballot Monkeys, Doctor Who: Revelation of the Daleks, Doctors, Kingdom, Trial & Retribution, The Bill, Spooks, Lady Killers, Vikings, Casualty, Wizards vs Aliens, The Wrong Mans and Inside No. 9 ("The Trial of Elizabeth Gadge"). He has also worked on the Kaldor City series of audio plays, and had a part in Chimerica at the Harold Pinter Theatre 2013.

In 2014, Cooper portrayed Simeon Swann in the third series of the CBBC science-fantasy series Wizards vs Aliens. Cooper starred alongside his brother Paul in the 2017 BBC Three mockumentary, This Country. The show also starred, and was written and created by, his niece and nephew, Daisy May and Charlie Cooper.

From 2017 to 2020, Cooper portrayed Sergeant Aubrey Woolf in the BBC One drama, Call the Midwife, leaving after the second episode in Series 9. From 2018 Cooper has revisited the character of ISPF Inspector Colin Devis in the continuing Star Cops audio dramas from Big Finish Productions.
