= Peggotty =

Fictional characters

Peggotty is the name of a character and family in Charles Dickens's 1850 novel David Copperfield.

== Clara Peggotty ==
Peggotty
- David Copperfield character
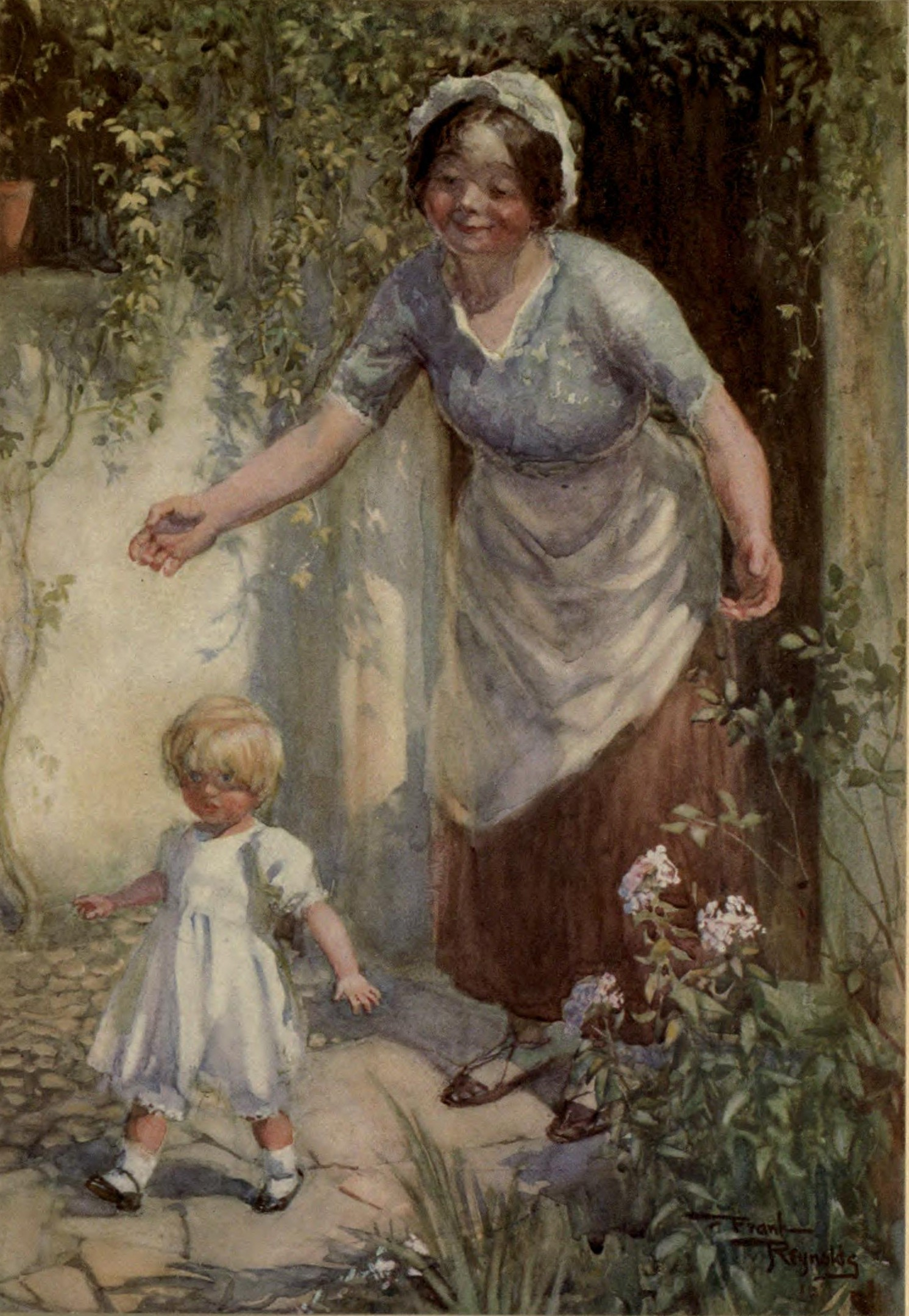
- Peggotty and little David; Art by Frank Reynolds (1910)
- Created by: Charles Dickens

In-universe information
- Occupation: housekeeper
- Spouse: Mr Barkis
- Home: Yarmouth
- Nationality: British

Clara Peggotty Barkis (née Peggotty), usually referred to as simply Peggotty (so as not to confuse her with David's mother, who is also named Clara), is the housekeeper of the family home and plays a big part in David's upbringing. Peggotty is the sister of Yarmouth fisherman Daniel Peggotty, and the aunt of Ham Peggotty and Little Em'ly. Early in the novel, David's aunt, Betsey Trotwood, dismisses Peggotty's surname (had it been a given name) as being pagan:

"Peggotty!" repeated Miss Betsey, with some indignation. "Do you mean to say, child, that any human being has gone into a Christian church, and got herself named Peggotty?"

Mrs Copperfield then explains that Peggotty is known by her surname to avoid confusion with herself as they share the same first name. As a "peggotty" or a "knitting nancy" (also known as a knitting loom) is a knitting device, the name may be a reference to Clara Peggotty's fondness for knitting.

Peggotty is described as having cheeks like a red apple. She is gentle and caring, opening herself and her family to David whenever he is in need. She remains faithful to David Copperfield all her life, being like a second mother to him, never abandoning him, his mother, or his great-aunt Miss Betsey Trotwood. In her kind motherliness, Peggotty contrasts markedly with the harsh and unloving Miss Murdstone, the sister of David's cruel, rude and wicked stepfather Mr Murdstone.

She marries carrier Mr Barkis and is afterwards sometimes referred to as Mrs Barkis, a name Aunt Betsey Trotwood regards as much more suitable. On her husband's death Peggotty inherits £3,000 — equivalent to about £350,000 in present-day value (2022). After his death, she becomes Betsy Trotwood's servant and companion.

Peggotty has been played by Daisy May Cooper (2019), Judy Cornwell (2000), Pauline Quirke (1999), Jenny McCracken (1986), Pat Keen (1974), Lila Kaye (1966), Elsa Vazzoler (1965), Barbara Ogilvie (1958), Jessie Ralph (1935), and Karen Caspersen (1922).

== Family ==
=== Daniel Peggotty ===
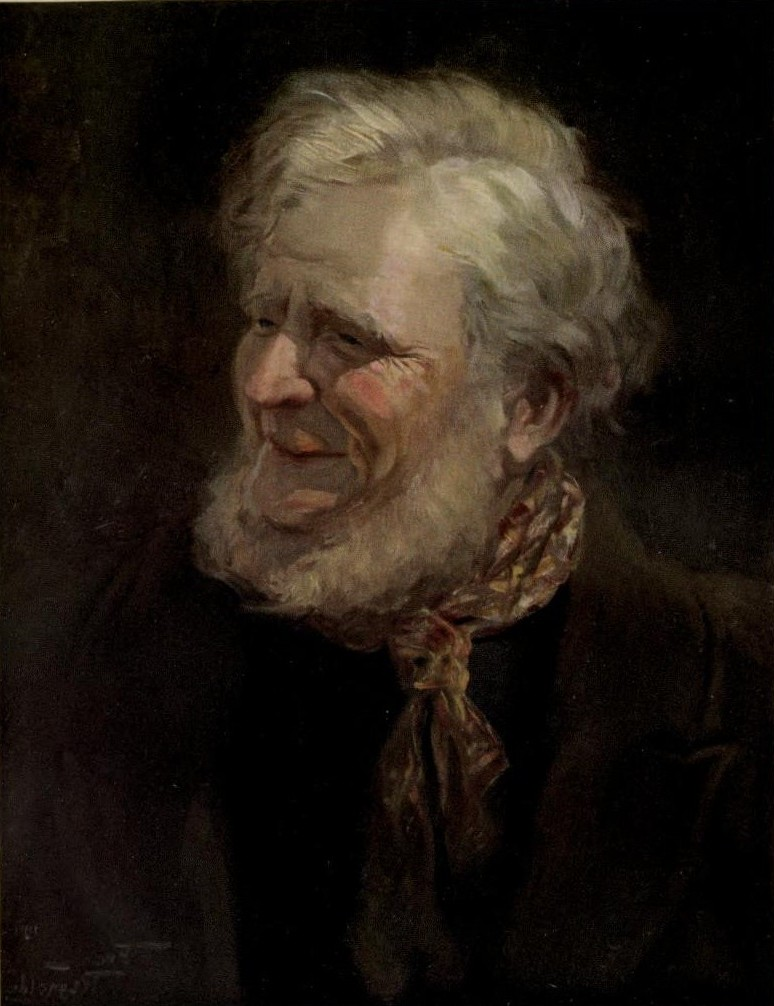
Daniel Peggotty "A hale grey-haired old man." (ch. LXIII). Art by Frank Reynolds (1910).

Yarmouth fisherman Daniel Peggotty is the brother of Clara. Referred to as "Mr Peggotty", he is a fisherman and dealer in lobsters, crabs, and crawfish. He lives in a converted boat on the beach at Yarmouth with Emily, Ham, and Mrs Gummidge. When Emily abandons them to elope with Steerforth, Daniel vows to find her. Steerforth later leaves Emily and she is re-united with Daniel. At the end of the novel Daniel, Emily, and Mrs Gummidge resettle in Australia.

=== Ham Peggotty ===
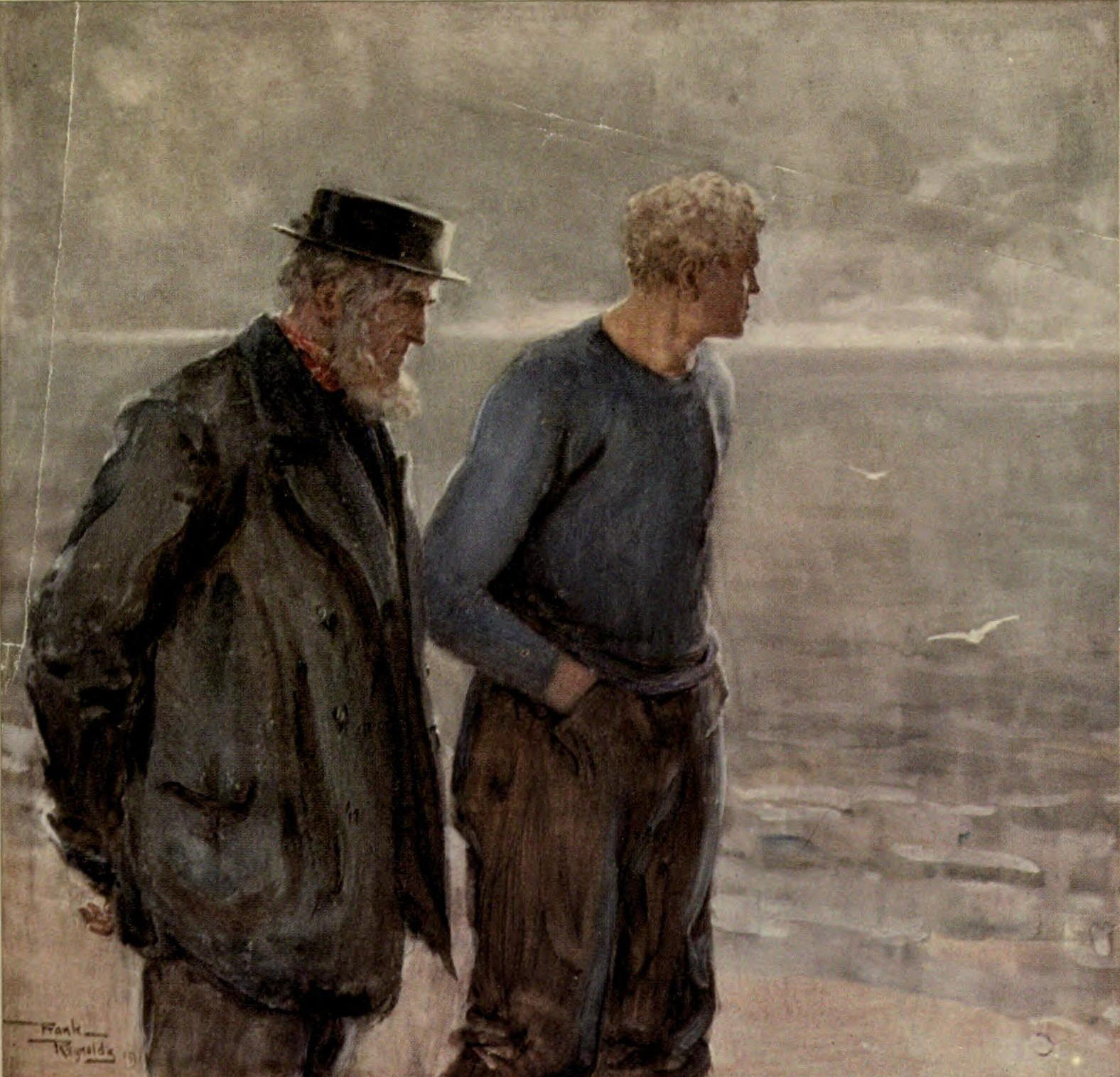
Ham (right) and Daniel Peggotty. Art by Frank Reynolds (1910).

A big and simple fisherman and boatbuilder, Ham Peggotty is the orphaned nephew of Clara and Daniel Peggotty and is the fiancé of Emily, a little girl very comparable to Annabel Lee, to whom he became engaged on the visit of David Copperfield and Steerforth to the boat house at Great Yarmouth. He drowns trying to rescue Steerforth during a storm at sea off Yarmouth. "He was a huge, strong fellow of six feet high, broad in proportion, and round-shouldered; but with a simpering boy's face and curly light hair that gave him quite a sheepish look. He was dressed in a canvas jacket, and a pair of such very stiff trousers that they would have stood quite as well alone, without any legs in them. And you couldn't so properly have said he wore a hat, as that he was covered in a-top, like an old building, with something pitchy."
