= See How They Run (2022 film) =

Film by Tom George

- Theatrical release poster
- Directed by: Tom George
- Written by: Mark Chappell
- Produced by: Damian Jones; Gina Carter
- Starring: Saoirse Ronan; Sam Rockwell; Adrien Brody; Ruth Wilson; Reece Shearsmith; Harris Dickinson; David Oyelowo
- Cinematography: Jamie D. Ramsay
- Edited by: Gary Dollner; Peter Lambert
- Music by: Daniel Pemberton
- Production company: DJ Films
- Distributed by: Searchlight Pictures
- Release dates: 9 September 2022 (United Kingdom); 16 September 2022 (United States)
- Running time: 98 minutes
- Countries: United Kingdom; United States
- Language: English
- Box office: $22 million

See How They Run is a 2022 comedy mystery film directed by Tom George, written by Mark Chappell and produced by Damian Jones and Gina Carter. The film stars Saoirse Ronan, Sam Rockwell, Adrien Brody, Ruth Wilson, Reece Shearsmith, Harris Dickinson, and David Oyelowo.

See How They Run was theatrically released in the United Kingdom on 9 September 2022 and in North America on 16 September 2022, by Searchlight Pictures. The film received positive reviews from critics and grossed $22 million worldwide. It was nominated for Outstanding British Film at the 76th British Academy Film Awards, among other accolades.

== Plot ==
In 1953 London, Agatha Christie's play The Mousetrap celebrates its 100th performance, and sleazy American director Leo Köpernick has been hired by producer John Woolf to direct a film adaptation. After his drunken behaviour towards the female lead Sheila Sim leads to a fistfight with her husband and co-star Richard Attenborough, Köpernick is killed backstage by an unseen assailant.

Inspector George Stoppard investigates the murder, shadowed by the inexperienced Constable Stalker. Everyone at the theatre is declared a suspect and a potential victim, including the play's producer Petula Spencer and Woolf's wife Edana Romney. Stoppard attempts to close the theatre until the murder is solved, but the Metropolitan Police Commissioner, Harold Scott, intervenes, assigning Stalker to assist in the investigation.

Stoppard and Stalker search Köpernick's room at the Savoy Hotel, finding his address book of women's details. The hotel manager recalls Köpernick's violent argument with screenwriter Mervyn Cocker-Norris, who admits to arguing with Köpernick over the director's vision for an action-packed ending for The Mousetrap film. Mervyn, who lives with his hot-headed "nephew" Gio, remembers a "plain woman" arriving at the hotel with Köpernick's son.

Stoppard and Stalker question Woolf who was blackmailed by Köpernick after he discovered Woolf's affair with his assistant, Ann. Dennis, an usher at the theatre, offers an unhelpful description of a suspicious figure; Attenborough and Sim are questioned as well. Spencer explains that she optioned The Mousetrap's film rights to Woolf, but he would be contractually unable to produce the adaptation until the show had closed.

At a pub, Stoppard bonds with Stalker and reveals that his unfaithful wife left him after having a child with another man. Driving a drunken Stoppard home, Stalker finds news articles and a picture of his ex-wife, fitting Mervyn's description of a "homely woman with glasses". Combined with Dennis's description, this leads Stalker to suspect Stoppard may be the killer, and she searches for his ex-wife in Köpernick's address book.

Stoppard and Stalker attend a performance of The Mousetrap, during which Mervyn, Woolf, Dennis, Gio, and Stoppard leave the auditorium; Stalker soon follows after watching Stoppard retrieve his gloves. In the foyer, Mervyn is strangled to death by a gloved figure. Stalker spots Stoppard kneeling over the body and gives chase, knocking him unconscious with a snow shovel.

Stoppard awakens in a cell, and Stalker and Scott accuse him of carrying out the murders. Stalker has summoned Joyce, the mother of Köpernick's son, but she is not Stoppard's ex-wife, exonerating him. Stalker escorts Joyce and her son home, and Joyce mentions overhearing a man with a "village idiot" accent. Reading through Mervyn's research on The Mousetrap, Stoppard realises the identity of the killer and races to the suspect's apartment, where Stalker has already burst inside and found the necessary evidence: the killer is Dennis.

Attenborough, Sim, Woolf, Ann, Spencer, and her elderly mother arrive at the home of Agatha Christie in Wallingford, Berkshire, having received invitations to dinner. The butler Fellowes is perplexed by their arrival, but Christie's husband, Max Mallowan, allows them inside. The group is held at gunpoint by Dennis, whom Spencer's mother recognises as Dennis Corrigan, an abused child whose brother's death inspired the plot of The Mousetrap. Dennis explains that he killed Köpernick and Mervyn in an attempt to stop the play and its adaptation, disgusted by the exploitation of his brother's tragedy for entertainment.

Having forged the invitations to lure everyone together, Dennis has captured Edana, mistaking her for Christie. Christie enters with tea, including a poisoned cup for Dennis which Fellowes inadvertently drinks instead. An armed Stoppard arrives and a shootout ensues; Sim distracts Dennis with a molotov cocktail, and Stalker nearly takes a bullet to save Stoppard, matching Köpernick's story pitch, before Agatha dispatches Dennis with a shovel. It is revealed that the bullet did, in fact, hit Stoppard, though the shot was not fatal.

Sometime later, Stalker passes her sergeant's exams and a recovering Stoppard receives the King's Police and Fire Services Medal, and they attend another performance of The Mousetrap together. At the very end of the film, Stoppard turns to the camera and asks the audience to keep the identity of the killer a secret, as happens at the end of the actual play The Mousetrap.

== Cast ==
- Sam Rockwell as Inspector George Stoppard, an alcoholic detective on the outs of his department who is assigned to the case
- Saoirse Ronan as Woman Constable Stalker, an energetic and eager-to-please officer who is assigned to assist Stoppard
- Adrien Brody as Leo Kopernick, the director of The Mousetrap's film adaptation
- Ruth Wilson as Petula Spencer, the producer of the play and broker for Agatha Christie
- Reece Shearsmith as John Woolf, the producer of The Mousetrap's film adaptation
- Harris Dickinson as Richard Attenborough, the charismatic star of the play
- Charlie Cooper as Dennis Corrigan, an usher employed by the theatre
- David Oyelowo as Mervyn Cocker-Norris, a well-known playwright and screenwriter of The Mousetrap's film adaptation
- Tim Key as Commissioner Harold Scott, Stoppard and Stalker's boss
- Shirley Henderson as Agatha Christie, the famously reclusive writer of The Mousetrap
- Lucian Msamati as Max Mallowan, Christie's enigmatic husband
- Pippa Bennett-Warner as Ann Saville, Woolf's assistant and mistress
- Pearl Chanda as Sheila Sim, Richard's wife and co-star of the play
- Paul Chahidi as Fellowes, Christie's clumsy butler
- Sian Clifford as Edana Romney, Woolf's wife
- Ania Marson as Mother
- Jacob Fortune-Lloyd as Gio, Cocker-Norris' "nephew"

== Production ==
The film was announced in November 2020 as an untitled mystery film from Searchlight Pictures, with Tom George on board to direct from a screenplay by Mark Chappell. George and Chappell worked together on later drafts of the script. The decision to make a film based around a thwarted film production of The Mousetrap came after producer Damian Jones was told the rights to the story were unavailable due to a stipulation in Agatha Christie's original contract, which became a plot point in the film.

Filming was largely conducted in London's West End during the UK's third COVID-19 lockdown, which allowed the production to use locations that would have otherwise been unavailable, including the Savoy Hotel, The Old Vic, the Dominion Theatre and St Martin's Theatre. George filmed a number of scenes with a split screen effect, inspired by the "split points of view" of a mystery story. Filming wrapped by April 2021.

The title was revealed to be See How They Run in July 2021.

== Release ==
See How They Run was released theatrically in the UK on 9 September 2022, and in the US on 16 September. The film was originally set for a 30 September release in the US, but was brought forward by two weeks due to "the lack of major studio product" late in the year.

The film was released for video on demand platforms on 1 November 2022.

== Reception ==
=== Box office ===
See How They Run grossed $9.6 million in the United States and Canada, and $12.4 million in other territories, for a worldwide total of $22 million. The film received a wide release domestically, debuting at $3.1 million from 2,404 cinemas, finishing fourth at the box office for its first weekend; it held at fifth the following weekend, and fell out of the Top 10 at the box office in its third week.

=== Streaming viewership ===
According to the streaming aggregator JustWatch, See How They Run was the 8th most streamed film across all platforms in the United States during the week of 31 October to 6 November 2022, and the 10th during the week of 7 to 13 November 2022.

=== Critical response ===
On the review aggregator website Rotten Tomatoes, 75% of 198 critics' reviews are positive, with an average rating of 6.5/10. The website's consensus reads: "See How They Run may not do itself many favors by asking for Christie comparisons, but this is still one fun whodunit." Metacritic, which uses a weighted average, assigned the film a score of 60 out of 100, based on 40 critics, indicating "mixed or average" reviews. Audiences polled by CinemaScore gave the film an average grade of "B−" on an A+ to F scale.

Teo Bugbee of The New York Times praised the film calling it "a plummy affair, a proper figgy pudding baked out of once-stale Scotland Yard tropes." Nell Minow of RogerEbert.com gave the film two and a half stars saying "all the stylishness and enthusiasm cannot disguise the fact that the mystery itself never comes close to those concocted by Dame Agatha."
