= Selin Hizli =

Turkish/Irish actress

- Born: Selin Salime Hizli; Oxford, Oxfordshire, England
- Education: Royal Academy of Dramatic Art
- Occupation: Actress
- Years active: 2011–present

Selin Saime Hizli (also credited as Seline Hizli} is an English actress and writer from Flamstead, Hertfordshire, best known for her starring role in the second and third series of the BBC One drama Land Girls. She is also known for her roles in Am I Being Unreasonable? (2022–present), which she also co-created and co-wrote, and Things You Should Have Done (2024).

== Early life and education ==
Selin Hizli was born in Oxford, Oxfordshire, and raised in Flamstead in Hertfordshire. She grew up working class with an Irish mother and a Turkish father. Her mother, Liz Hizli, is a community fundraiser.

After a four-stage application process, she was one of only 34 young actors to be accepted for a place at the Royal Academy of Dramatic Art in 2007 to do a three-year acting degree. She graduated in July 2010.

== Career ==
After graduating from RADA, Hizli won the part of Connie Carter in the second series of the BBC One wartime drama Land Girls. To prepare for the role, she researched the work of the Women's Land Army. She returned to the series for its third run of episodes in 2011. Also in 2011, Hizli appeared in an episode of the sixth series of Law & Order: UK.

Hizli's first professional stage role was the part of Katie in the play One Night in November at the Belgrade Theatre, Coventry. Further credits include a starring role as The Bride in an adaptation of Federico García Lorca's Blood Wedding which was performed at the 2012 London Festival Fringe. She also appeared as Amelia in the play The House of Bernarda Alba, also by Federico García Lorca, which was performed between 19 January and 10 March 2012 at the Almeida Theatre, London.

== Other activities ==
Hizli appeared at the Brit Awards 2023 with Daisy May Cooper to present the award for Brit Award for British Rock/Alternative Act.

== Filmography ==
Year	Title	Role	Notes
2011	Appropriate Adult	Mae West	Two-part television film
2011	Law & Order: UK	Sara Waldman	Series 6; episode 4: "Trial"
2011	Land Girls	Connie Carter	Main role; series 2 & 3; 10 episodes
2013	Casualty	Lucy Packard	Series 28; episode 5: "Waiting for a Star to Fall"
2013	Beneath	Mother	Short film
2014	Call the Midwife	Doris Aston	Series 3; episode 2
2014	Kerry	Tracey	Television film
2015	Luther	Stacey Bell	Series 4; episode 2
2016–2017	Grantchester	Margaret Ward	Main role; series 2 & 3; 13 episodes
2016–2018	Mum	Debbie	Recurring role; series 1; episodes 4 & 6, & series 2; episode 2
2019	Father Brown	Maria Hardy	Series 7; episode 7: "The House of God"
2020	Deadwater Fell	Sacha Thompson	Mini-series; episodes 1 & 2
2020	Avenue 5	Janine	Series 1; episode 4: "Wait a Minute, Then Who Was That on the Ladder?"
2020	Doctors	Charlotte Harrison	Series 21; episode 171: "Merry Frightmas"
2022, 2025	Am I Being Unreasonable?	Jen	Main role; series 1 & 2; 12 episodes. Also co-creator & co-writer with Daisy May Cooper
2023	Six Four	Samantha Wishart	Episodes 1 & 2
2024	Things You Should Have Done	Auntie Karen	Main role; series 1; episodes 1–6
2025	Malpractice	Dr. Sophia Hernandez	Series 2
2026	How to Get to Heaven from Belfast	Jodie	
2026	Silent Witness	DI Kayla Baran	Series 29: "The Enemy Within" Part 1 and 2
