= Tom George (director) =

British director

Tom George is a British director of film and television. He is known for his feature directorial debut, See How They Run (2022), which was nominated for Outstanding British Film at the 76th British Academy Film Awards.

He is also known for directing the comedy series This Country (2017–2020), for which he won a BAFTA Award.

== Filmography ==
=== Television ===
Year	Title	Director	Writer	Executive producer	Notes
2017–2020	This Country	Yes	No	Yes	also ”Story by” credit
2019	Defending the Guilty	Yes	No	No	
2024	Sherwood	Yes	No	No	Series 2 (3 episodes)
2024	The Franchise	Yes	No	No	(2 episodes)
2026	Bait	Yes	No	No	(3 episodes)
2026	Two Weeks in August	Yes	No	Yes	

=== Film ===
Year	Title	Director	Writer	Producer	Notes
2013	Mickey and Michaela Bury Their Dad	Yes	Yes	Yes	Short film
2022	See How They Run	Yes	No	No	
