= This Country =

British television series

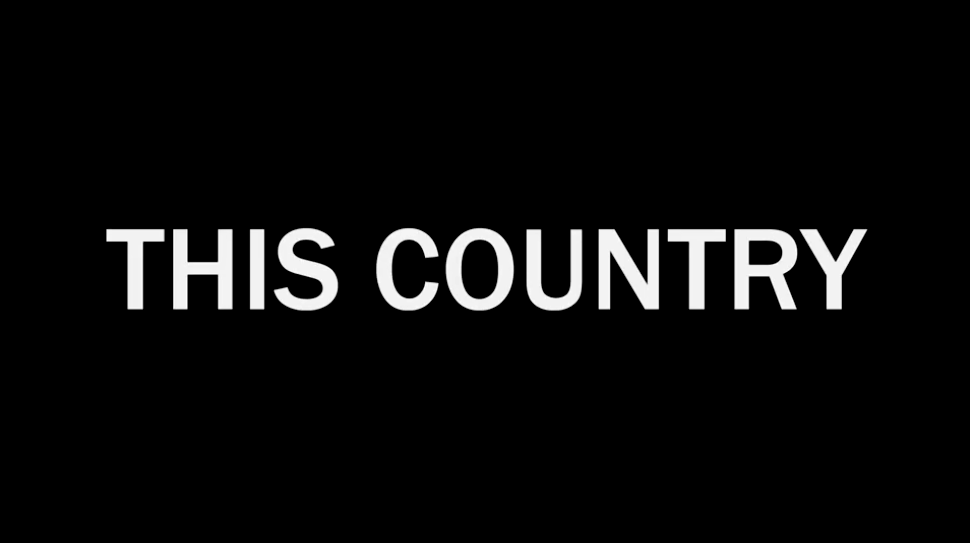
- Genre: Sitcom; Mockumentary
- Created by: Daisy May Cooper; Charlie Cooper
- Written by: Daisy May Cooper; Charlie Cooper
- Directed by: Tom George
- Starring: Daisy May Cooper; Charlie Cooper
- Country of origin: United Kingdom
- No. of series: 3
- No. of episodes: 19

Production
- Executive producer: Stephen McCrum
- Producer: Simon Mayhew-Archer
- Editor: Craig Harbour
- Running time: 21–31minutes
- Production company: BBC Studios

Original release
- Network: BBC Three
- Release: 8 February 2017 – 23 March 2020

This Country is a British mockumentary sitcom, first broadcast in the United Kingdom on BBC Three on 8 February 2017. Created by, written by and starring siblings Daisy May Cooper and Charlie Cooper and directed by Tom George, the series focuses on the day-to-day lives of two cousins living in a small village in the Cotswolds. The programme includes themes of social clumsiness, the trivialities of human behaviour, the eccentricities of living in rural England, and the boredom and social isolation of young people in small communities. The programme shows relatable and comedic situations in every episode.

The Cooper siblings play the central characters, cousins Kerry and Lee "Kurtan" Mucklowe. Much of the series revolves around their unlikely friendship with the local vicar, Rev. Francis Seaton, played by Paul Chahidi. The Coopers' father, Paul Cooper, plays Kerry's father Martin Mucklowe; their uncle, Trevor Cooper, plays local man and antagonist Len Clifton. Although credited to "Ivy Woodcock", the voice of Sue Mucklowe – Kerry's mother, never seen on screen – is provided by Daisy May.

Across the three series and the special, This Country received more than 52 million BBC iPlayer requests, and was later added to the platform shortly after its end.

== Cast ==
=== Main cast ===
- Daisy May Cooper as Kerry Mucklowe. Kerry lives with her mother, Sue, who is never seen (also voiced by Cooper, she communicates with Kerry by yelling at her from her bedroom). Due to the limited opportunities and mundanity in the rural area where she lives, she is nihilistic and lacking in self-purpose.
- Charlie Cooper as Lee "Kurtan" Mucklowe, Kerry's cousin. Although equally as bored as his cousin Kerry, Kurtan tends to have slightly more ambition in life and has plans to leave the village. He lives with his grandmother, whom Kerry despises.

=== Supporting cast ===
- Paul Chahidi as the Rev. Francis Seaton, the parish vicar. Kind-hearted Rev. Seaton is responsible for most of the events that bring the village community together. He is also something of a father figure and mentor to Kerry and Kurtan, assisting them in times of need.
- Michael Sleggs as Michael "Slugs" Slugette (series 1–2). A quiet young man who has terminal cancer.
- Paul Cooper as Martin Mucklowe, Kerry's estranged father. Although Kerry thinks the world of her dad, he is shown to be a selfish, narcissistic man who does not reciprocate her fondness for him at all. This was Paul Cooper's first acting role; he is the lead actors' real father, and had no previous experience when he was encouraged to go to the screen test for the role. Cooper reportedly based the voice and mannerisms of his character on unsettling police interview tapes with serial killer Fred West, who lived nearby in Gloucester.
- Ashley McGuire as Mandy Harris. Known as 'Big Mandy' to some, she is a woman in the village who has a thuggish-looking appearance and a boorish demeanour.

=== Recurring cast ===
- Trevor Cooper as Len Clifton. An elderly, lonely man who is a hoarder.
- Daisy May Cooper (credited as Ivy Woodcock) as Sue Mucklowe (voice only)
- Eliza Hunt as June Winwood (series 1, 3)
- Celeste Dring as Kayleigh Hudson, a painfully shy and emotionless girl who becomes Kurtan's short-lived girlfriend before ending up with Slugs.
- Badger Skelton as Levi Johnson (series 1)
- David Hargreaves as Arthur Andrews (series 2–3)
- Abra Thompson as Sophie Huxley (series 2–3)
- Nic Kozyrev as Liam "Pork Chop" Dunmore (series 1–3)
- Colin Wakeman as Colin Cresswell (series 2–3)

=== Guest cast ===
- Matthew Rees as Robert Robinson (series 1)
- Preston Nyman as "Weak" Nathan Kay (series 1)
- Laura Checkley as Shaz Gallagher (series 1)
- David Nightingale as Steve "Nugget" Nuggins, Kerry's uncle (series 1)
- Alfie Simmons as Neil "Count Fartula" Pedley (series 1)
- Liam Steward-George as PC Webber (series 1–2)
- Jimmy Walker as Dan Greaves (series 2–3)
- Gerran Howell as Jacob Seaton, the Vicar's son (series 2)
- Elvira Presley as Kurtan's Nan (series 3)

== Origins ==
The Coopers' first television appearance in character as the Mucklowes was in 2016, on the BBC Three show Live from the BBC.

== Production ==
The series was filmed on location in and around the small town of Northleach. Daisy Cooper said, "All the material is based around stuff that happens in Cirencester, but when we went to the channel they thought that Cirencester was a bit too big and Northleach is a smaller village, and sort of isolates the characters a bit more. Makes them more claustrophobic." The location used for exterior shots of Kerry's house is at 16 Fortey Road in Northleach.

Filming for the first series began in September 2016 and finished three weeks later. A second series was quickly confirmed, with filming taking place over the summer of 2017 and its first episode being released on 26 February 2018. A one-off special episode, forming an epilogue to the second series, was filmed over the summer of 2018 and broadcast in October that year.

On 30 May 2019, actor Michael Sleggs announced that he was suffering from heart issues and did not have long to live. He died 40 days later at the age of 33. The third and final series was filmed from August to October 2019, and broadcast from February to March 2020.

== Episodes ==
Series	Episodes	Originally released	
Series	Episodes	First released	Last released
1	6	8 February 2017	15 March 2017
2	6 (+1)	26 February 2018	2 April 2018; 10 October 2018 (special)
3	6	17 February 2020	23 March 2020

=== Series 1 (2017) ===
No. overall	Title	Directed by	Written by	Original release date
1	"Scarecrow"	Tom George	Daisy May Cooper & Charlie Cooper	8 February 2017
Kurtan enters the annual village scarecrow-making competition with high hopes of winning first prize and getting his photograph on the front page of The Gazette. His hopes are dashed when he finds there has been a mix-up with the allocation of pitches and he must set up his scarecrow at the distant and little-visited Trowley Bottom Farm. Kerry is apparently challenged to a fight by youths from a neighbouring village.
2	"Mandy"	Tom George	Daisy May Cooper & Charlie Cooper	15 February 2017
Kerry and Kurtan are celebrating the news that their former woodwork teacher from school has died. Kurtan becomes obsessed with discovering what happened to Rob Robinson, a classmate whom neither Kerry or Slugs can recall. Mandy, the local "hard woman", announces that she is setting up a business as a tattoo artist and intimidates Kerry into agreeing to have a tattoo, despite demonstrating that she has no artistic talents.
3	"Oven Space"	Tom George	Daisy May Cooper & Charlie Cooper	22 February 2017
Kerry and Kurtan are awaiting the arrival home of their uncle, "Nugget" Nuggins, who is being released from prison. It becomes apparent that while Kerry looks up to Nugget and is excited by the prospect of his return, Kurtan is not so enthusiastic and is terrified of him. While they both wait for their uncle's return, arguments break out over whose food should occupy the top shelf of the oven.
4	"King of the Nerds"	Tom George	Daisy May Cooper & Charlie Cooper	1 March 2017
Following an argument with her mother about money, Kerry decides to look for a job. With an assurance of potential earnings of £15,000 per month, she is persuaded to join a pyramid scheme, taking out a loan of £200 to buy her way in. Assisted by Kurtan she attempts to establish a door-to-door sales operation. However, Kurtan is instead more interested in playing Warhammer with his new "nerdy" friends, Neil and Nathan.
5	"Peeping Tom"	Tom George	Daisy May Cooper & Charlie Cooper	8 March 2017
Kerry's estranged father Martin is accused of voyeurism and kicked out of his home by his girlfriend Sandra. Kerry attempts to establish a new relationship with him while he is temporarily living in a caravan in a field. Kurtan and Slugs become rivals for the attention of Kayleigh Hudson, a girl who has just moved to the village.
6	"GNVQ"	Tom George	Daisy May Cooper & Charlie Cooper	15 March 2017
Kurtan is offered a place at Swindon College, studying for a GNVQ in health and social care. Kerry has difficulty coming to terms with the idea that he will be leaving the village and her behind. Rev. Seaton attempts to act as an intermediary to reconcile their differences.

=== Series 2 (2018) ===
No. overall	Title	Directed by	Written by	Original release date
1	"Random Acts of Kindness"	Tom George	Daisy May Cooper & Charlie Cooper	26 February 2018
Kerry has turned over a new leaf and is trying to do good deeds for her community. Meanwhile, Kurtan has made the decision to not go to Swindon College indefinitely and has formed a new relationship with a girl called Sophie. This relationship becomes strained and they eventually break up.
2	"Threatening Letters"	Tom George	Daisy May Cooper & Charlie Cooper	5 March 2018
Kerry starts to receive some threatening letters that cause her to feel unsettled within the village. Kerry's neighbour, 'Big' Mandy Harris, is on hand to help and advise. Meanwhile, Kurtan takes a labouring job with Kerry's father, Martin, and learns some invaluable life lessons.
3	"Minor Injuries"	Tom George	Daisy May Cooper & Charlie Cooper	12 March 2018
It's the first Saturday of the month and Kurtan tries to make a pilgrimage to Swindon to buy the new clothes of the season. However, he struggles to find a local bus route that will take him. Meanwhile, Kerry helps the vicar run the local football team and ends up injuring herself during a game.
4	"The Vicar's Son"	Tom George	Daisy May Cooper & Charlie Cooper	19 March 2018
When the vicar's son Jacob returns to the village, he begins to hang out with Kurtan, who soon realises that he has a problem with drink and drugs. Meanwhile, Kerry agrees to fill in for the vicar on tea-time visits to elderly residents, and she grows to like them more than expected.
5	"Steam Fair"	Tom George	Daisy May Cooper, Charlie Cooper, Tom George, and Simon Mayhew-Archer	26 March 2018
It is Kerry's birthday, but due to disruptions in their plans, they are unable to make it to the local steam fair and end up getting lost in the woods.
6	"Family Loyalties"	Tom George	Daisy May Cooper & Charlie Cooper	2 April 2018
Kurtan has a job at a bowls club but takes it too seriously. Kerry is excited to be helping her father in his business, which turns out to be receiving stolen goods and hiding them in a garage.

=== Special (2018) ===
Title	Directed by	Written by	Original release date
"The Aftermath"	Tom George	Daisy May Cooper, Charlie Cooper, Tom George, and Simon Mayhew-Archer	10 October 2018
With seven months having passed since Kerry and Martin were arrested thanks to their “business work”, the village is having to adapt to reality again. Now Martin is in prison, Kerry is doing anything to establish connections with his past, while Kurtan begins to learn some harsh truths about why he no longer works at the bowls club.

=== Series 3 (2020) ===
No. overall	Title	Directed by	Written by	Original release date
1	"A Letter from Slugs"	Tom George	Daisy May Cooper & Charlie Cooper	17 February 2020
Michael 'Slugs' Slugett dies and leaves behind a letter to Kurtan, which reveals that Kerry once broke a bed and blamed it on Kurtan. Kerry gets a job at the local dump but then starts stealing items on the premises.
2	"Driving Lesson"	Tom George	Daisy May Cooper & Charlie Cooper	24 February 2020
Kurtan is learning to drive and the vicar runs some errands for people in the village. Len Clifton is taken into hospital for dehydration after he is found in a bush.
3	"Cynthia"	Tom George	Daisy May Cooper & Charlie Cooper	2 March 2020
Kerry's dad Martin returns, but she finds that her parents living together again is not what she wanted. She spots him cheating, and he is thrown out. The vicar and Kurtan help Len to get back on his feet. Len finds love online with someone who claims to be called Cynthia but this later turns out to be a scam.
4	"Kurtan's Half Brother"	Tom George	Daisy May Cooper & Charlie Cooper	9 March 2020
Kurtan learns that Ray, his half-brother, has died and a funeral is held in the village. Kerry joins the vicar’s book club which is later spoiled by Big Mandy and her storytelling.
5	"The Station"	Tom George	Daisy May Cooper & Charlie Cooper	16 March 2020
While the vicar is in Bristol, Kerry takes care of the parish chickens, and Kurtan helps with other problems from the village. Kerry learns that she accidentally left the cage open and the chickens are killed by a fox, while Kurtan becomes impatient with the residents.
6	"Harvest"	Tom George	Daisy May Cooper & Charlie Cooper	23 March 2020
The vicar promotes Kerry to the leader of the church harvest, while Kurtan prepares to move into a new flat. The vicar decides to leave to run a parish in Bristol, and Kerry and Kurtan bid an emotional goodbye to him.

== Reception ==
This Country received positive reviews from critics. Stuart Heritage, for The Guardian, described it as a "perfectly observed" comedy, and wrote: "I found myself rewinding entire scenes because I was too busy howling with laughter to hear what was going on." Sean O'Grady, for The Independent, wrote: "It isn't very often that I am able to recommend something because it made me weep tears of laughter, but I am happy and heartened to say that the latest BBC mockumentary, This Country, is sublime enough to have lifted my spirits heavenwards... [It has] an uneasily well-observed quality that raises the comedic genre almost to an art form." Rupert Hawksley, for The Daily Telegraph, wrote: "It is, by some distance, the funniest thing on television at the moment." Mike McCahill, for Reader's Digest, described the programme as an "increasingly cherishable mockumentary" and essential viewing, observing that "[the] Coopers have created an entire universe in a handful of episodes." Arts critic Bruce Dessau concluded: "It might have well-used stylistic elements of both The Office and People Just Do Nothing about it, but it is sharply-written and deftly performed [and] stays just on the right side of cliché. And most importantly both Kerry and Lee are richly comic."

== Awards ==
Year	Award	Category	Nominee(s)	Result	Ref.
2018	Royal Television Society Awards	Scripted Comedy	This Country	Won	
2018	Royal Television Society Awards	Comedy Performance	Daisy May Cooper and Charlie Cooper	Won	
2018	Royal Television Society Awards	Breakthrough Award	Daisy May Cooper and Charlie Cooper	Nominated	
2018	Royal Television Society Awards	Writer: Comedy	Daisy May Cooper and Charlie Cooper	Won	
2018	British Academy Television Awards	Best Scripted Comedy	This Country	Won	
2018	British Academy Television Awards	Best Female Comedy Performance	Daisy May Cooper	Won	
2018	British Academy Television Craft Awards	Best Writer: Comedy	Daisy May Cooper and Charlie Cooper	Nominated	
2018	British Academy Television Craft Awards	Best Breakthrough Talent	Daisy May Cooper and Charlie Cooper	Won	
2019	British Academy Television Awards	Best Female Comedy Performance	Daisy May Cooper	Nominated	
2019	British Academy Television Craft Awards	Best Writer: Comedy	Daisy May Cooper and Charlie Cooper	Won	
2019	Royal Television Society Awards	Comedy Performance: Female	Daisy May Cooper	Nominated	
2020	Royal Television Society Craft & Design Awards	Director - Comedy Drama / Situation Comedy	Tom George	Nominated	
2021	British Academy Television Awards	Best Scripted Comedy	This Country	Nominated	
2021	British Academy Television Awards	Best Female Comedy Performance	Daisy May Cooper	Nominated	
2021	British Academy Television Awards	Best Male Comedy Performance	Charlie Cooper	Won	
2021	British Academy Television Craft Awards	Best Writer: Comedy	Daisy May Cooper and Charlie Cooper	Nominated	
2021	Royal Television Society Awards	Comedy Performance: Male	Paul Chahidi	Nominated	

== Home video releases ==
All three series of This Country and the Aftermath Special have been released in Regions 2 both individually and in box sets.

DVD Title	Discs	Year	Ep. No.	DVD releases			Notes
DVD Title	Discs	Year	Ep. No.	Region 1	Region 2	Region 4	Notes
Complete Series 1–2	2	2017–2018	12		22 October 2018		
Complete Series 3	1	2020	7		30 March 2020		Includes the Aftermath Special
Complete Series 1–3	3	2017–2020	19		30 March 2020		Includes the Aftermath Special

== Adaptation ==
On 4 December 2019, an American adaptation of the series was announced by Fox, developed by Jenny Bicks and directed by Paul Feig. On 30 January 2020, it was announced that the production had been given a pilot order. On 30 October, it was announced that the production had been given a series order and was scheduled for premiere in the 2021–22 television season. On 17 May 2021, it was announced that the title of the American series had been changed from This Country to Welcome to Flatch.

Welcome to Flatch premiered on 17 March 2022 and ran until 2 February 2023, spanning two seasons. The series was cancelled in October 2023.

== Books ==
in October 2019 a tie-in book, entitled This Is This Country: The official book of the BAFTA award-winning show, was published.
