= Daisy May Cooper =

English actor and writer

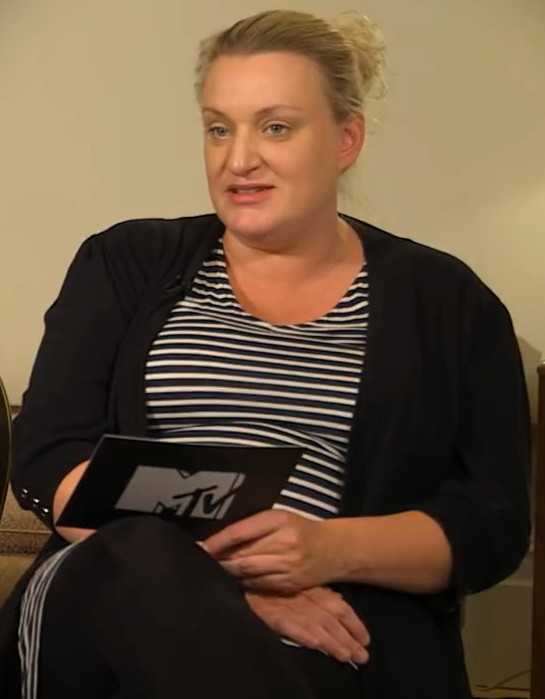
- Cooper in 2017
- Born: Basingstoke, Hampshire, England
- Education: Royal Academy of Dramatic Art
- Occupations: Actor; writer
- Years active: 2011–present
- Spouse: Will Weston (m. 2019; sep. 2021)
- Children: 3
- Relatives: Charlie Cooper (brother); Trevor Cooper (uncle); Mathew Baynton (second cousin)

Daisy May Cooper is an English actress, comedian and writer. She won the 2018 BAFTA TV Award for Best Female Comedy Performance for playing Kerry Mucklowe in the BBC Three series This Country, which she co-created and co-wrote with her younger brother, Charlie Cooper.

== Early life and education ==
Daisy May Cooper was born in Basingstoke, Hampshire, the elder of two children. She grew up living in a two-bedroom council house in Cirencester. Her brother, Charlie Cooper, is also an actor and writer.

She attended Cirencester Deer Park School, followed by drama school at the Royal Academy of Dramatic Art in London, graduating in 2010.

== Career ==
After one role as a young mother in ITV series Doc Martin, Cooper returned to the West Country, working as a cleaner with her brother Charlie. For a while the siblings lived together, and their experiences would later form part of the writings for This Country.

In 2014, she landed the role of PC Garvey in the TV series The Wrong Mans. In the same year, a pilot based on the Coopers' initial series pitch had been shot for ITV as the (never released) film Kerry, setting the basis for This Country.

She wrote and starred with her brother, Charlie, in the BBC Three comedy series This Country, for which she won a TV BAFTA Award for Best Female Comedy Performance in 2018. Due to the success of the first series of This Country, a second series was commissioned and aired on BBC Three in February 2018. A third series aired in 2020.

In 2019, she played Peggotty in The Personal History of David Copperfield and in 2020, she had a part in Armando Iannucci's HBO space comedy Avenue 5. She also appeared with her father, Paul, on Celebrity Gogglebox. On 29 July 2020, Cooper took part in the tenth series of Taskmaster.

In 2022 she played one of the two lead characters in the television sitcom The Witchfinder. She co-wrote, with Selin Hizli, and starred in Am I Being Unreasonable?, which first aired on BBC One and BBC iPlayer in 2022, followed by a second series in February 2025, and the third and final series due to air in late 2026.

In 2023, she participated as "Otter" on the fourth series of The Masked Singer and starred in Rain Dogs. Also that year, she began voicing Tiny the elephant in an advertising campaign for bank TSB.

In March 2025, she starred in the first season of LOL: Last One Laughing UK, hosted by Jimmy Carr and Roisin Conaty, alongside Richard Ayoade, Sara Pascoe, Lou Sanders, Rob Beckett, Judi Love, Bob Mortimer, Joe Wilkinson, Joe Lycett, and Harriet Kemsley. She returned for the Halloween Special in October 2026, ultimately winning.

== Personal life ==
Cooper married her long-term partner, Will Weston, on 21 September 2019. The couple have two children, a daughter and a son. In July 2021, it was reported that Cooper had separated from her husband 10 months after the birth of their son.

Cooper has another son.

Cooper's second cousin Mathew Baynton is also an actor, as is her uncle Trevor Cooper.

== Filmography ==
=== TV drama ===
| Year | Title | Role | Other Role | Notes | Ref. |
|---|---|---|---|---|---|
| 2011 | Doc Martin | Young Mum | | Series 5; Episode 5: "Remember Me" | |
| 2014 | The Wrong Mans | PC Garvey | | 2 episodes | |
| 2017–2020 | This Country | Kerry Mucklowe | Co-writer, Creator | | |
| 2020–2022 | Avenue 5 | Sarah (season 1); Zarah (season 2) | Writer (episode 7) | | |
| 2022 | The Witchfinder | Thomasine Gooch | | | |
| 2022–2025 | Am I Being Unreasonable? | Nic | Co-writer, Creator | 2 series | |
| 2023 | Rain Dogs | Costello Jones | | | |
| 2025 | Asterix and Obelix: The Big Fight | Impedimenta (voice) | | Animated miniseries | |
| 2025 | Nightwatch | Herself | | With Charlie Cooper | |

=== TV game shows and reality ===
| Year | Title | Role | Notes | Ref. |
|---|---|---|---|---|
| 2020 | Taskmaster | Contestant | Series 10 | |
| 2020 | 8 Out of 10 Cats Does Countdown | Contestant | Series 20 (episode 3) | |
| 2021–present | Never Mind the Buzzcocks | Team Captain | Series 29, 30 & 31 | |
| 2022 | RuPaul's Drag Race: UK vs. the World | Guest judge | Series 1 | |
| 2023 | The Masked Singer | Otter | Unmasked in episode 6 | |
| 2023 | Ant & Dec's Saturday Night Takeaway | Star Guest Announcer | Series 19; Episode 3 | |
| 2024 | The Big Fat Quiz | Contestant | Episode: "The Big Fat Quiz of Telly" | |
| 2025 | LOL: Last One Laughing UK | Contestant | Series 1 | |

=== Film ===
| Year | Title | Role | Notes | Ref. |
|---|---|---|---|---|
| 2019 | The Personal History of David Copperfield | Peggotty | | |
