= Charlie Cooper (actor) =

English actor, comedian and writer

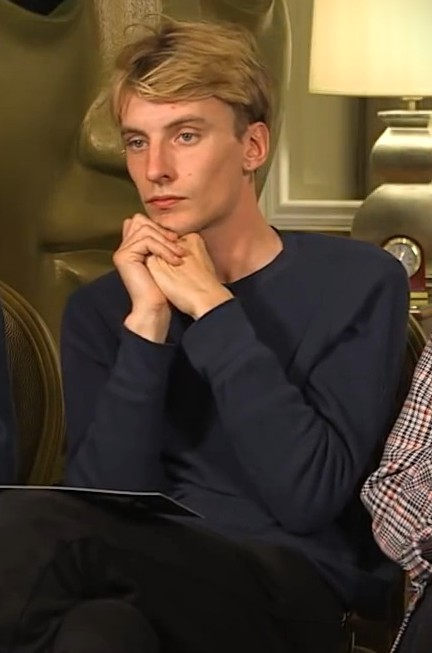
- Cooper in 2017
- Born: June 16, 1989 (age 37); Cirencester, Gloucestershire, England
- Occupations: Actor; comedian; writer; model
- Years active: 2014–present
- Relatives: Daisy May Cooper (sister); Trevor Cooper (uncle); Mathew Baynton (second cousin)

Charlie Cooper (born 16 June 1989) is an English actor, comedian and writer, known for his role as Lee "Kurtan" Mucklowe in the BBC Three series This Country, which he co-created and co-wrote alongside his older sister, Daisy May Cooper.

== Early life and education ==
Charlie Cooper and his sister Daisy May Cooper were brought up in Cirencester, Gloucestershire. They used to make films using their mother's camcorder.

== Career ==
Cooper began his career in his early 20s as a model while studying sports science at Exeter University for two years. He was signed to Elite Model Management in London. He grew dissatisfied with modelling shortly afterward and returned home to Cirencester with his parents, sharing a room with his sister Daisy May and worked a series of odd jobs, including positions at retailers Argos and Topshop, a sausage factory, and working night shifts with his sister, cleaning offices. During this time they began creating scripts for what would eventually become the basis for This Country.

In 2014 he and his sister Daisy May, with the support of ITV and NBC, wrote and shot a pilot episode of what would later become This Country titled Kerry. However, the resulting episode was "horrible" and it was quickly dropped. Later he became an actor and co-writer of the BBC comedy This Country with Daisy May, writing the characters Kerry and Kurtan based on their own life experiences living in the Cotswolds.

In 2018 he was nominated for and won three Royal Television Awards for best Scripted Comedy, Comedy Performance and Comedy Writing. He was also nominated for and won best Scripted Comedy at the 2018 BAFTA awards for his work in This Country, as well as winning Breakthrough Talent at the BAFTA Craft Awards. In 2020, he co-wrote and produced the teleplay for an episode of Avenue 5, an HBO series that features his sister in a recurring role.

He starred alongside Steve Coogan in a scene in the 2019 film Greed. In 2019 The Guardian described his portrayal of Kevin, boyfriend of Sian O'Callaghan, in A Confession, ITV's dramatisation of the investigation of her murder, as "a fine performance that channels the role in This Country ... without repeating it".

In 2021 Cooper took on a role in the third series of Stath Lets Flats, playing Gregory - a rival letting agent. Also in 2021, Cooper was a guest on Episode 6, Series 4 of Mortimer & Whitehouse: Gone Fishing.

In September 2022, Cooper played his first "big film role" as Dennis Corrigan in See How They Run.

In 2023, Cooper began voicing Trevor the dinosaur in an advertising campaign for retailer Argos.

In November 2023 it was announced by Paramount+ that Cooper would star in a new original drama series Stags, filming on location in Tenerife which was released in 2024.

In October 2024 Charlie Cooper's Myth Country was released by BBC Three on BBC iPlayer. The programme was an exploration of traditional British myths, legends and folk rituals. He has said that it was inspired by his work on This Country.

In February 2025, Cooper guest starred in Am I Being Unreasonable?, which was co-created by his older sister Daisy May.

In October 2025 he starred in Daisy May and Charlie Cooper's NightWatch, along with his sister Daisy.

== Personal life ==
Cooper is a fan of Fulham F.C., and attended their play-off final in 2018.

In August 2022, Cooper welcomed his first child.

Cooper's second cousin Mathew Baynton is also an actor.
