= British Academy Television Craft Award for Best Emerging Talent: Factual =

Award for technical achievements in TV

British Academy Television Craft Award
- Country: United Kingdom
- Presented by: British Academy of Film and Television Arts
- First award: 2001
- Currently held by: Olaide Sadiq for Grenfell: Uncovered (2026)
- Website: http://www.bafta.org/

The British Academy Television Craft Award for Best Emerging Talent: Factual is one of the categories presented by the British Academy of Film and Television Arts (BAFTA) within the British Academy Television Craft Awards, the craft awards were established in 2000 with their own, separate ceremony as a way to spotlight technical achievements, without being overshadowed by the main production categories. According to the BAFTA website, the category is "designed to recognise potential, awarding those who have begun to capture the attention of their peers through demonstrating exceptional talent and ambition within their craft for the first time in factual programming."

Several categories have existed to recognize breakthrough talent and new faces in the British television industry:

- From 2001 to 2005, three categories were presented to recognize new writers and directors in television; Best New Writer, Best Director: Factual and Best Director: Fiction.
- In 2006, those categories were transformed into one category that was presented until 2020, Best Breakthrough Talent.
- Also, in 2006 the Anthony Asquith Award for New Composer was presented.

In 2020 it was announced that the category would be split once again for the 2021 ceremony, creating Best Emerging Talent: Factual and Best Emerging Talent: Fiction.

== Winners and nominees ==
=== 2000s ===
Best New Writer

| Year | Recipient(s) | Title | Broadcaster |
|---|---|---|---|
| 2001 | Ed McCardie | Tinsel Town | BBC Two |
| 2001 | David Nicholls | Cold Feet | ITV |
| 2001 | Damian Wayling | The Bill (for "A Girl's Best Friend") | ITV |
| 2001 | Martin McCardie | Tinsel Town | BBC Two |
| 2002 | Rob Dawber | The Navigators | Channel 4 |
| 2002 | Daniel Brocklehurst | Clocking Off | BBC One |
| 2002 | Richard Cottan | Men Only | Channel 4 |
| 2002 | Rowan Joffé | Gas Attack | Channel 4 |
| 2003 | Anna Maloney | Falling Apart | Channel 4 |
| 2003 | Matt Greenhalgh | Clocking Off | BBC One |
| 2003 | Charlie Martin | Teachers | Channel 4 |
| 2003 | Ed Roe | Teachers | Channel 4 |
| 2004 | Rosemary Kay | This Little Life | BBC One |
| 2004 | Helen Blakeman | Pleasureland | Channel 4 |
| 2004 | Terry Cafolla | Holy Cross | BBC One |
| 2004 | Jack Lothian | Teachers | Channel 4 |
| 2005 | Brian Dooley | The Smoking Room | BBC Three |
| 2005 | Brian Hill | Bella and the Boys | BBC One |
| 2005 | Kwame Kwei-Armah | Elmina's Kitchen | BBC Four |
| 2005 | Derren Litten, Catherine Tate | The Catherine Tate Show | BBC Two |

Best New Director: Factual

| Year | Recipient(s) | Title | Broadcaster |
|---|---|---|---|
| 2001 | Sarah MacDonald | Newsnight: "A Family Affair" (Special) | BBC Two |
| 2001 | Lucy Carter | Britain at War in Colour | ITV |
| 2001 | Jonah Weston | Anatomy of Disgust | Channel 4 |
| 2001 | Frances Byrnes | Picture This: The Pavlov Ballet | BBC Two |
| 2002 | Donovan Wylie | Witness: The Train | Channel 4 |
| 2002 | Marc Issacs | Alt TV: Lift | Channel 4 |
| 2002 | Penny Jagessar | Me and My Dad | Channel 4 |
| 2002 | Carol Morley | The Alcohol Years | Channel 4 |
| 2003 | Alice Yglesias | Death | Channel 4 |
| 2003 | Giles Llewellyn-Thomas | The Mystery of the Three Kings | BBC Two |
| 2003 | Mark Elliott | Barbarians: Secrets of the Dark Ages | Channel 4 |
| 2003 | Jamie O'Leary | Teenage Dwarf | Channel 4 |
| 2004 | Oli Barry | The Nine Lives of Alice Martineau | BBC Three |
| 2004 | Will Anderson | Surviving Extremes: The Swamp | Channel 4 |
| 2004 | Paul Berczeller | Alt TV: This is a True Story | Channel 4 |
| 2004 | Jamie Jay Johnson | Alt TV: Holidays Around My Bedroom | Channel 4 |
| 2005 | Patrick Collerton | The Boy Whose Skin Fell Off | Channel 4 |
| 2005 | James Brabazon | This World: "Holidays in the Danger Zone: Violent Coast" | BBC Two |
| 2005 | Julia Black | My Foetus | Channel 4 |
| 2005 | Krishnendu Majumdar | Who You Callin' a Nigger? | Channel 4 |

Best New Director: Fiction

| Year | Recipient(s) | Title | Broadcaster |
|---|---|---|---|
| 2001 | Dominic Savage | Nice Girl | BBC Two |
| 2001 | Chris Morris | Jam | Channel 4 |
| 2001 | Caroline Aherne | The Royle Family | BBC One |
| 2001 | Jon Jones | Cold Feet | ITV |
| 2002 | Edmund Coulthard | Tales from Pleasure Beach | BBC Two |
| 2002 | Richard Dale | Teachers | Channel 4 |
| 2002 | Brian Kirk | Hearts and Bones | BBC One |
| 2002 | David Morrissey | Sweet Revenge | BBC One |
| 2003 | Brian Hill | Falling Apart | Channel 4 |
| 2003 | Giacamo Campiotti | Dr Zhivago | ITV |
| 2003 | Mark Nunneley | 15 Storeys High | BBC Three |
| 2003 | Minkie Spiro | HOLBY CI+Y | BBC One |
| 2004 | Sarah Gavron | This Little Life | BBC One |
| 2004 | Andrew Lincoln | Teachers | Channel 4 |
| 2004 | Tim Supple | Twelfth Night | Channel 4 |
| 2004 | Gabriel Range | The Day Britain Stopped | BBC Two |
| 2005 | Daniel Percival | Dirty War | BBC One |
| 2005 | Angus Jackson | Elmina's Kitchen | BBC Four |
| 2005 | Paul King | The Mighty Boosh | BBC Three |
| 2005 | Sarah Lancashire | The Afternoon Play: Viva Las Blackpool | BBC One |

Anthony Asquith Award for New Composer

| Year | Recipient(s) | Title | Broadcaster |
|---|---|---|---|
| 2005 | Jane Antonia Cornish | Five Children and It | Jim Henson Company |
| 2005 | David Gray | A Way of Life | Tantrum Films |
| 2005 | Andrew Hewitt | Garth Marenghi's Darkplace | Channel 4 |
| 2005 | Paul Leonard | Fallen | ITV |

Best Breakthrough Talent

| Year | Recipient(s) | Title | Broadcaster |
|---|---|---|---|
| 2006 | Lee Phillips | How to Start Your Own Country | BBC Two |
| 2006 | Edward Thomas | Doctor Who | BBC One |
| 2006 | Dan Edge | Israel and the Arabs: Elusive Peace | BBC Two |
| 2006 | Misha Manson-Smith | High Spirits with Shirley Ghostman | BBC Three |
| 2007 | Sharon Foster | Shoot the Messenger | BBC Two |
| 2007 | Neil Biswas | Bradford Riots | Channel 4 |
| 2007 | Brian Fillis | Fear of Fanny | BBC Four |
| 2007 | Nick Holt | Guys and Dolls | BBC One |
| 2008 | Jezza Neumann | Dispatches: "China's Stolen Children (Special)" | Channel 4 |
| 2008 | Writing Team | Skins | E4 |
| 2008 | Mark O’Rowe | Boy A | Channel 4 |
| 2008 | Patrick Reams | A Very British Sex Scandal | Channel 4 |
| 2009 | Daniel Vernon | Wonderland: The Man Who Eats Badgers | BBC Two |
| 2009 | Charlie Brooker | Dead Set | E4 |
| 2009 | Alison Millar | The Father, The Son and The Housekeeper | BBC Four |
| 2009 | Tony Saint | Margaret Thatcher: The Long Walk to Finchley | BBC Four |

=== 2010s ===
Best Breakthrough Talent

| Year | Recipient(s) | Title | Broadcaster |
|---|---|---|---|
| 2010 | Jessie Versluys | The Hospital; Katie: My Beautiful Face | Channel 4 |
| 2010 | Ed Hime | Skins | E4 |
| 2010 | Matt Rudge | The Autistic Me | BBC Three |
| 2010 | Ed Wardle | Alone in the Wild | Channel 4 |
| 2011 | Jon Brown | Mongrels | BBC Three |
| 2011 | Caroline Skinner | Five Days | BBC One |
| 2011 | Dave Whyte | Pete Versus Life | Channel 4 |
| 2011 | Aaron Young | Battle of Britain: The Real Story | BBC Two |
| 2012 | Kwadjo Dajan | Appropriate Adult | ITV |
| 2012 | Tom Basden | Fresh Meat | Channel 4 |
| 2012 | Stefan Golaszewski | Him & Her | BBC Three |
| 2012 | Clare Johns | Panorama: "The Truth About Adoption" | BBC One |
| 2013 | Tim Whitnall (Writer) | Best Possible Taste: The Kenny Everett Story | BBC Four |
| 2013 | Mike Bartlett (Writer) | The Town | ITV |
| 2013 | Julie Gearey (Writer) | Prisoners' Wives | BBC One |
| 2013 | Rhys Thomas (Director) | Freddie Mercury: The Great Pretender (Director’s Cut) | BBC One |
| 2014 | Daniel Fajemisin-Duncan, Marlon Smith | Run | Channel 4 |
| 2014 | Nancy Harris | Dates | Channel 4 |
| 2014 | Dan Smith | David Attenborough’s Natural History Museum Alive 3D | Sky 3D |
| 2014 | Sam Leifer, Teddy Leifer | PLEBS | ITV2 |
| 2015 | Marc Williamson | The Last Chance School | Channel 4 |
| 2015 | Chris Lunt | Prey | ITV |
| 2015 | Marcel Mettelsiefen | Dispatches: "Children on the Frontline" | Channel 4 |
| 2015 | Regina Moriarty | Murdered by My Boyfriend | BBC Three |
| 2016 | Michaela Coel | Chewing Gum | E4 |
| 2016 | D. C. Moore | Not Safe for Work | Channel 4 |
| 2016 | Marcus Plowright | Muslim Drag Queens | Channel 4 |
| 2016 | Guillem Morales | Inside No. 9 | BBC Two |
| 2017 | Mahalia Belo | Ellen | Channel 4 |
| 2017 | Vinay Patel | Murdered by My Father | BBC Three |
| 2017 | Phoebe Waller-Bridge | Fleabag | BBC Three |
| 2017 | Phoebe Waller-Bridge | Crashing | Channel 4 |
| 2017 | Sarah Quintrell | Ellen | Channel 4 |
| 2018 | Daisy May Cooper, Charlie Cooper | This Country | BBC Three |
| 2018 | Bernard MacMahon, Allison McGourty | Arena American Epic The Sessions | BBC One |
| 2018 | Charlotte Wolf | Inspector George Gently (for "Episode 1") | BBC One |
| 2018 | Tom Pursey | Fighting Cancer: My Online Diary | Channel 4 |
| 2019 | Akemnji Ndifornyen (composer, producer and writer) | Famalam | BBC Three |
| 2019 | Dawn Shadforth (director) | Trust (for "Silenzio") | BBC Two |
| 2019 | Lizzie Kempton (director) | Manchester Bomb: Our Story | BBC Three |
| 2019 | Georgia Christou (writer) | Through the Gates (for "On the Edge") | Channel 4 |

=== 2020s ===
Best Breakthrough Talent

| Year | Recipient(s) | Title | Broadcaster |
|---|---|---|---|
| 2020 | Aisling Bea (Writer) | This Way Up | Channel 4 |
| 2020 | Aneil Karia (Director) | Pure (for "Episode 3") | Netflix |
| 2020 | Laurie Nunn (Writer) | Sex Education | Netflix |
| 2020 | Sean Buckley (Writer) | Responsible Child | BBC Two |

Best Emerging Talent: Factual

| Year | Recipient(s) | Title | Broadcaster |
|---|---|---|---|
| 2021 | Marian Mohamed (director) | Defending Digga D | BBC Three |
| 2021 | Ashley Francis-Roy (shooting producer/director) | Damilola: The Boy Next Door & The Real Eastenders | Channel 4 |
| 2021 | Jessica Kelly (director) | The Schools that Chain Boys | BBC Two |
| 2021 | Kandise Abiola (producer) | Terms & Conditions: A UK Drill Story | YouTube |
| 2022 | Adam Brown (Director) | Into the Storm: Surfing to Survive (Storyville) | BBC Four |
| 2022 | Hugh Davies (Producer) | Football's Darkest Secret: The End of Silence | BBC One |
| 2022 | Poppy Begum (Director) | Queens of Rap | Channel 4 |
| 2022 | Sophie Cunningham (Director/Producer) | Look Away | Sky Documentaries |
| 2023 | Charlie Melville (Producer/Director) | John & Joe Bishop: Life After Deaf | ITV |
| 2023 | Helen Hobin (Photography) | Frozen Planet II | BBC One |
| 2023 | Joy Ash (Series Producer) | Super Surgeons: A Chance at Life | Channel 4 |
| 2023 | Jason Osborne (Director) | Our Jubilee | ITV |
| 2024 | Fred Scott (Director) | London Bridge: Facing Terror | Channel 4 |
| 2024 | Fola Evans-Akingbola, Jordan Pitt (Directors) | Untold Stories: Hair on Set | Sky Documentaries |
| 2024 | Ben Cheetham (Director) | Pete Doherty, Who Killed My Son? | Channel 4 |
| 2024 | Ted Evans (Director) | Rose Ayling-Ellis: Sings for Change | BBC One |
| 2025 | Jaber Badwan (Director of Photography) | Kill Zone: Inside Gaza | Channel 4 |
| 2025 | Anna Johnston (Director) | Parole | BBC Two |
| 2025 | Lucy Wells (Shooting Director) | 24 Hours in Police Custody: "Murder on Prescription" | Channel 4 |
| 2026 | Olaide Sadiq (Director) | Grenfell: Uncovered | Netflix |
| 2026 | Alexandra Lacey (Writer/Director) | The Twister: Caught in the Storm | Netflix |
| 2026 | Elle Mower (Director) | Convicting My Ex | BBC Three |

== See also ==
- British Academy Television Craft Award for Best Emerging Talent: Fiction
