= British Academy Television Craft Award for Best Emerging Talent: Fiction =

Award for technical achievements in TV

British Academy Television Craft Award
- Country: United Kingdom
- Presented by: British Academy of Film and Television Arts
- First award: 2001
- Currently held by: Janice Okoh for Just Act Normal (2026)
- Website: http://www.bafta.org/

The British Academy Television Craft Award for Best Emerging Talent: Fiction is one of the categories presented by the British Academy of Film and Television Arts (BAFTA) within the British Academy Television Craft Awards, the craft awards were established in 2000 with their own, separate ceremony as a way to spotlight technical achievements, without being overshadowed by the main production categories. According to the BAFTA website, the category is "designed to recognise potential, awarding those who have begun to capture the attention of their peers through demonstrating exceptional talent and ambition within their craft for the first time in scripted programming."

Several categories have existed to recognize breakthrough talent and new faces in the British television industry:

- From 2001 to 2005, three categories were presented to recognize new writers and directors in television; Best New Writer, Best Director: Factual and Best Director: Fiction.
- In 2006, those categories were transformed into one category that was presented until 2020, Best Breakthrough Talent.
- Also, in 2006 the Anthony Asquith Award for New Composer was presented.

In 2020 it was announced that the category would be split once again for the 2021 ceremony, creating Best Emerging Talent: Fiction and Best Emerging Talent: Factual.

== Winners and nominees ==
=== 2000s ===
Best New Writer

Year	Recipient(s)	Title	Broadcaster
2001	Ed McCardie	Tinsel Town	BBC Two
2001	David Nicholls	Cold Feet	ITV
2001	Damian Wayling	The Bill (for "A Girl's Best Friend")	ITV
2001	Martin McCardie	Tinsel Town	BBC Two
2002	Rob Dawber	The Navigators	Channel 4
2002	Daniel Brocklehurst	Clocking Off	BBC One
2002	Richard Cottan	Men Only	Channel 4
2002	Rowan Joffé	Gas Attack	Channel 4
2003	Anna Maloney	Falling Apart	Channel 4
2003	Matt Greenhalgh	Clocking Off	BBC One
2003	Charlie Martin	Teachers	Channel 4
2003	Ed Roe	Teachers	Channel 4
2004	Rosemary Kay	This Little Life	BBC One
2004	Helen Blakeman	Pleasureland	Channel 4
2004	Terry Cafolla	Holy Cross	BBC One
2004	Jack Lothian	Teachers	Channel 4
2005	Brian Dooley	The Smoking Room	BBC Three
2005	Brian Hill	Bella and the Boys	BBC One
2005	Kwame Kwei-Armah	Elmina's Kitchen	BBC Four
2005	Derren Litten, Catherine Tate	The Catherine Tate Show	BBC Two

Best New Director: Factual

Year	Recipient(s)	Title	Broadcaster
2001	Sarah MacDonald	Newsnight: A Family Affair (Special)	BBC Two
2001	Lucy Carter	Britain at War in Colour	ITV
2001	Jonah Weston	Anatomy of Disgust	Channel 4
2001	Frances Byrnes	Picture This: The Pavlov Ballet	BBC Two
2002	Donovan Wylie	Witness: The Train	Channel 4
2002	Marc Issacs	Alt TV: Lift	Channel 4
2002	Penny Jagessar	Me and My Dad	Channel 4
2002	Carol Morley	The Alcohol Years	Channel 4
2003	Alice Yglesias	Death	Channel 4
2003	Giles Llewellyn-Thomas	The Mystery of the Three Kings	BBC Two
2003	Mark Elliott	Barbarians: Secrets of the Dark Ages	Channel 4
2003	Jamie O'Leary	Teenage Dwarf	Channel 4
2004	Oli Barry	The Nine Lives of Alice Martineau	BBC Three
2004	Will Anderson	Surviving Extremes: The Swamp	Channel 4
2004	Paul Berczeller	Alt TV: This is a True Story	Channel 4
2004	Jamie Jay Johnson	Alt TV: Holidays Around My Bedroom	Channel 4
2005	Patrick Collerton	The Boy Whose Skin Fell Off	Channel 4
2005	James Brabazon	This World: "Holidays in the Danger Zone: Violent Coast"	BBC Two
2005	Julia Black	My Foetus	Channel 4
2005	Krishnendu Majumdar	Who You Callin' a Nigger?	Channel 4

Best New Director: Fiction

Year	Recipient(s)	Title	Broadcaster
2001	Dominic Savage	Nice Girl	BBC Two
2001	Chris Morris	Jam	Channel 4
2001	Caroline Aherne	The Royle Family	BBC One
2001	Jon Jones	Cold Feet	ITV
2002	Edmund Coulthard	Tales from Pleasure Beach	BBC Two
2002	Richard Dale	Teachers	Channel 4
2002	Brian Kirk	Hearts and Bones	BBC One
2002	David Morrissey	Sweet Revenge	BBC One
2003	Brian Hill	Falling Apart	Channel 4
2003	Giacamo Campiotti	Dr Zhivago	ITV
2003	Mark Nunneley	15 Storeys High	BBC Three
2003	Minkie Spiro	HOLBY CI+Y	BBC One
2004	Sarah Gavron	This Little Life	BBC One
2004	Andrew Lincoln	Teachers	Channel 4
2004	Tim Supple	Twelfth Night	Channel 4
2004	Gabriel Range	The Day Britain Stopped	BBC Two
2005	Daniel Percival	Dirty War	BBC One
2005	Angus Jackson	Elmina's Kitchen	BBC Four
2005	Paul King	The Mighty Boosh	BBC Three
2005	Sarah Lancashire	The Afternoon Play: Viva Las Blackpool	BBC One

Anthony Asquith Award for New Composer

Year	Recipient(s)	Title	Broadcaster
2005	Jane Antonia Cornish	Five Children and It	Jim Henson Company
2005	David Gray	A Way of Life	Tantrum Films
2005	Andrew Hewitt	Garth Marenghi's Darkplace	Channel 4
2005	Paul Leonard	Fallen	ITV

Best Breakthrough Talent

Year	Recipient(s)	Title	Broadcaster
2006	Lee Phillips	How to Start Your Own Country	BBC Two
2006	Edward Thomas	Doctor Who	BBC One
2006	Dan Edge	Israel and the Arabs: Elusive Peace	BBC Two
2006	Misha Manson-Smith	High Spirits with Shirley Ghostman	BBC Three
2007	Sharon Foster	Shoot the Messenger	BBC Two
2007	Neil Biswas	Bradford Riots	Channel 4
2007	Brian Fillis	Fear of Fanny	BBC Four
2007	Nick Holt	Guys and Dolls	BBC One
2008	Jezza Neumann	Dispatches: "China's Stolen Children (Special)"	Channel 4
2008	Writing Team	Skins	E4
2008	Mark O’Rowe	Boy A	Channel 4
2008	Patrick Reams	A Very British Sex Scandal	Channel 4
2009	Daniel Vernon	Wonderland: The Man Who Eats Badgers	BBC Two
2009	Charlie Brooker	Dead Set	E4
2009	Alison Millar	The Father, The Son and The Housekeeper	BBC Four
2009	Tony Saint	Margaret Thatcher: The Long Walk to Finchley	BBC Four

=== 2010s ===
Best Breakthrough Talent

Year	Recipient(s)	Title	Broadcaster
2010	Jessie Versluys	The Hospital; Katie: My Beautiful Face	Channel 4
2010	Ed Hime	Skins	E4
2010	Matt Rudge	The Autistic Me	BBC Three
2010	Ed Wardle	Alone in the Wild	Channel 4
2011	Jon Brown	Mongrels	BBC Three
2011	Caroline Skinner	Five Days	BBC One
2011	Dave Whyte	Pete Versus Life	Channel 4
2011	Aaron Young	Battle of Britain: The Real Story	BBC Two
2012	Kwadjo Dajan	Appropriate Adult	ITV
2012	Tom Basden	Fresh Meat	Channel 4
2012	Stefan Golaszewski	Him & Her	BBC Three
2012	Clare Johns	Panorama: "The Truth About Adoption"	BBC One
2013	Tim Whitnall (Writer)	Best Possible Taste: The Kenny Everett Story	BBC Four
2013	Mike Bartlett (Writer)	The Town	ITV
2013	Julie Gearey (Writer)	Prisoners' Wives	BBC One
2013	Rhys Thomas (Director)	Freddie Mercury: The Great Pretender (Director’s Cut)	BBC One
2014	Daniel Fajemisin-Duncan, Marlon Smith	Run	Channel 4
2014	Nancy Harris	Dates	Channel 4
2014	Dan Smith	David Attenborough’s Natural History Museum Alive 3D	Sky 3D
2014	Sam Leifer, Teddy Leifer	PLEBS	ITV2
2015	Marc Williamson	The Last Chance School	Channel 4
2015	Chris Lunt	Prey	ITV
2015	Marcel Mettelsiefen	Dispatches: "Children on the Frontline"	Channel 4
2015	Regina Moriarty	Murdered by My Boyfriend	BBC Three
2016	Michaela Coel	Chewing Gum	E4
2016	D. C. Moore	Not Safe for Work	Channel 4
2016	Marcus Plowright	Muslim Drag Queens	Channel 4
2016	Guillem Morales	Inside No. 9	BBC Two
2017	Mahalia Belo	Ellen	Channel 4
2017	Vinay Patel	Murdered by My Father	BBC Three
2017	Phoebe Waller-Bridge	Fleabag	BBC Three
2017	Phoebe Waller-Bridge	Crashing	Channel 4
2017	Sarah Quintrell	Ellen	Channel 4
2018	Daisy May Cooper, Charlie Cooper	This Country	BBC Three
2018	Bernard MacMahon, Allison McGourty	Arena American Epic The Sessions	BBC One
2018	Charlotte Wolf	Inspector George Gently (for "Episode 1")	BBC One
2018	Tom Pursey	Fighting Cancer: My Online Diary	Channel 4
2019	Akemnji Ndifornyen (composer, producer and writer)	Famalam	BBC Three
2019	Dawn Shadforth (director)	Trust (for "Silenzio")	BBC Two
2019	Lizzie Kempton (director)	Manchester Bomb: Our Story	BBC Three
2019	Georgia Christou (writer)	Through the Gates (for "On the Edge")	Channel 4

=== 2020s ===
Best Breakthrough Talent

Year	Recipient(s)	Title	Broadcaster
2020	Aisling Bea (Writer)	This Way Up	Channel 4
2020	Aneil Karia (Director)	Pure (for "Episode 3")	Netflix
2020	Laurie Nunn (Writer)	Sex Education	Netflix
2020	Sean Buckley (Writer)	Responsible Child	BBC Two

Best Emerging Talent: Fiction

Year	Recipient(s)	Title	Broadcaster
2021	Georgi Banks-Davies (director)	I Hate Suzie	Sky Atlantic
2021	Harry Tulley (dubbing mixer)	Anthony	BBC One
2021	Stephen S. Thompson (writer)	Sitting in Limbo	BBC One
2021	William Stefan Smith (director)	On the Edge: BBW	Channel 4
2022	Adjani Salmon (Writer)	Dreaming Whilst Black	BBC Three
2022	Nathan Bryon (Writer)	Bloods	Sky One
2022	Nida Manzoor (Writer/Director)	We Are Lady Parts	Channel 4
2022	Runyararo Mapfumo (Director)	Sex Education	Netflix
2023	Pete Jackson (Writer)	Somewhere Boy	Channel 4
2023	Jack Rooke (Writer)	Big Boys	Channel 4
2023	Nicôle Lecky (Writer)	Mood	BBC Three
2023	Lynette Lindon (Director)	My Name is Leon	BBC Two
2024	Kat Sadler (Writer)	Such Brave Girls	BBC Three
2024	Haolu Wang (Director)	Bodies	Netflix
2024	Andrew Bogle (Writer)	Kirkmoore	BBC Three
2024	Mawaan Rizwan (Writer)	Juice	BBC Three
2025	Lucia Keskin (Writer)	Things You Should Have Done	BBC Three
2025	Mitch Kalisa (Director)	On the Edge: "Letting Go"	Channel 4
2025	Phil Dunning (Writer)	Smoggie Queens	BBC Three
2025	Kyla Harris, Lee Getty (Writers)	We Might Regret This	BBC Two
2026	Janice Okoh (Writer)	Just Act Normal	BBC Three
2026	Chloe English (Director)	G'wed	ITV2
2026	Emily McDonald (Director)	Am I Being Unreasonable?	BBC One
2026	Eros V (Director)	Juice	BBC Three

== See also ==
- British Academy Television Craft Award for Best Emerging Talent: Factual
