= British Academy Television Craft Award for Best Make-Up & Hair Design =

Award for technical achievements in TV

British Academy Television Craft Award
- Country: United Kingdom
- Presented by: British Academy of Film and Television Arts
- First award: 1978
- Currently held by: Vickie Lang, Nik Williams, Barrie Gower & Attila Vég for Amadeus (2026)
- Website: http://www.bafta.org/

The British Academy Television Craft Award for Best Make-Up & Hair Design is one of the categories presented by the British Academy of Film and Television Arts (BAFTA) within the British Academy Television Craft Awards, the craft awards were established in 2000 with their own, separate ceremony as a way to spotlight technical achievements, without being overshadowed by the main production categories. According to the BAFTA website, the eligibility of this category is "limited to artists directly responsible for the make up and hair design in the programme."

It was awarded as Best Make-Up in 1978 and kept the name until 1999, since 2000 the category is presented as Best Make-Up & Hair Design.

== Winners and nominees ==
=== 1970s ===
Year	Title	Recipient(s)
1978	Hard Times	Jeanne Richmond
1978	Anna Karenina	Ann Ailes
1978	Count Dracula	Suzanne Broad
1978	Raffles	Phillippa Haigh
1978	Mike Yarwood in Persons	Cecile Hay-Arthur
1978	Three Weeks	Joan Hills
1978	Poldark	Sylvia James
1978	Marie Curie/The Warrior’s Return	Elaine Mair
1978	Holding On	Mary McDonough
1978	Macbeth	Maureen Winslade
1979	Lillie	Pauline Green, Lynda Bayne
1979	The Prime of Miss Jean Brodie	Anne Hamilton
1979	The One and Only Phyllis Dixey	Joan Hills
1979	Edward & Mrs. Simpson	Angela Seyfang

=== 1980s ===
Year	Title	Recipient(s)
1980	Prince Regent	Toni Chapman
1980	Stanley Baxter on Television	Rosemary Field
1980	Churchill and the Generals	Eileen Mair
1980	Crime And Punishment/Suez 1956	Pam Meager
1981	Dr Jekyll and Mr Hyde	Sylvia Thornton
1981	Worzel Gummidge	Marion Durnford
1981	Cream in My Coffee	Pauline Green
1981	Thérèse Raquin	Jean Speak
1982	Brideshead Revisited	Deborah Tinsey, Ruth Quinn
1982	Winston Churchill: The Wilderness Years	Christine Beveridge, Mary Hillman
1982	Worzel Gummidge	Marion Durnford
1982	The Stanley Baxter Series	Rosemary Field
1983	The Stanley Baxter Hour	Rosemary Field
1983	Walter	Elaine Carew
1983	Nicholas Nickleby	Robin Grantham
1983	Smiley's People/Barchester Chronicles	Elizabeth Rowell
1984	Kennedy	Christine Beveridge
1984	An Englishman Abroad	Kezia De Winne
1984	Reilly, Ace of Spies	Eddie Knight, Basil Newall
1984	King Lear	Lois Richardson
1985	The Jewel in the Crown	Anna Jones
1985	Journey Into the Shadows/A Portrait of Gwen John 1876-1939	Toni Chapman
1985	Threads	Jan Nethercot
1985	Tenko	Vanessa Poulton
1986	Bleak House	Lisa Westcott
1986	Edge of Darkness	Daphne Croker
1986	Silas Marner	Kezia De Winne
1986	Tender is the Night	Jean Speak
1987	The Singing Detective	Frances Hannon
1987	The Monocled Mutineer	Daphne Croker
1987	Lost Empires	Deborah Pownall, Ruth Quinn
1987	The Life and Loves of a She-Devil	Elizabeth Rowell
1987	Bluebell	Christine Walmesley-Cotham
1987	The Return of Sherlock Holmes	Glenda Wood
1988	Tutti Frutti	Lorna Blair
1988	Porterhouse Blue	Tommie Manderson
1988	Blackadder the Third	Vicki Pocock
1988	Fortunes of War	Elizabeth Rowell
1989	Tumbledown	Shauna Harrison
1989	The Storyteller	Jim Henson's Creature Shop, Sally Sutton
1989	A Very British Coup	Lindy Shaw
1989	The Chronicles of Narnia	Sylvia Thornton

=== 1990s ===
Year	Title	Recipient(s)	Broadcaster
1990	Agatha Christie's Poirot	Hilary Martin, Christine Cant, Roseann Samuel	ITV
1990	The Chronicles of Narnia	Sylvia Thornton	BBC
1990	Precious Bane	Jan Nethercot	BBC
1990	The Woman in Black	Christine Allsopp	ITV
1991	Omnibus: "Van Gogh"	Joan Stribling	BBC One
1991	The Chronicles of Narnia	Denise Baron	BBC
1991	Portrait of a Marriage	Lisa Westcott	BBC Two
1991	French and Saunders	Jan Sewell	BBC Two
1992	Casualty (for "Episodes 2,5,6 & 8")	Sue Kneebone	BBC One
1992	Agatha Christie's Poirot (for "Programmes 2,3,6,7 & 8")	Janis Gould	ITV
1992	Jim Henson's Greek Myths	Sally Sutton, Jim Henson's Creature Shop	Channel 4
1992	G.B.H.	Anne Spiers	Channel 4
1993	Stars in Their Eyes	Glenda Wood	ITV
1993	Casualty (for "Episodes 2,4,8,10 & 12")	Jan Nethercot	BBC One
1993	The Rory Bremner Show	Caroline Noble	Channel 4
1993	The House of Bernarda Alba	Anne Spiers	BBC
1994	French and Saunders	Sallie Jaye, Jan Sewell	BBC One
1994	Mr Wroe’s Virgins	Ann Humphreys	BBC Two
1994	Casualty (for "Episodes 12, 15")	Jo Bailey	BBC One
1994	Lipstick on Your Collar	Sallie Jaye	Channel 4
1995	Middlemarch	Deanne Turner	BBC One
1995	London’s Burning	Val Ackrill	ITV
1995	Rory Bremner, Who Else?	Helen Barrett	Channel 4
1995	Martin Chuzzlewit	Tracy Southam	BBC Two
1996	Cold Comfort Farm	Dorka Nieradzik	BBC
1996	Pride and Prejudice	Caroline Noble	BBC One
1996	Persuasion	Jean Speak	BBC Two
1996	The Buccaneers	Christine Walmesley-Cotham	ITV
1997	The Tenant of Wildfell Hall	Jean Speak	BBC One
1997	Rory Bremner, Who Else?	Helen Barratt	Channel 4
1997	French and Saunders	Darren Phillips	BBC One
1997	Jane Austen's Emma	Mary Hillman	ITV
1998	Tom Jones	Jean Speak	BBC One
1998	Rory Bremner, Who Else?	Helen Barrett	Channel 4
1998	A Dance to the Music of Time	Mary Hillman	Channel 4
1998	The Mill on the Floss	Ann Buchanan	BBC
1999	Our Mutual Friend	Lisa Westcott	BBC Two
1999	Stars in Their Eyes	Glenda Wood	ITV
1999	Far from the Madding Crowd	Dorka Nieradzik	BBC Two
1999	French and Saunders (Christmas Special)	Jan Sewell, Darren Phillips	BBC One

=== 2000s ===
Make-Up & Hair Design

Year	Title	Recipient(s)	Broadcaster
2000	Wives and Daughters	Lisa Westcott	BBC One
2000	Oliver Twist	Lesley Lamont-Fisher	ITV
2000	Great Expectations	Fran Needham	BBC Two
2000	French and Saunders	Jan Sewell	BBC One
2001	Gormenghast	Joan Hills, Christine Greenwood	BBC Two
2001	Longitude	Chrissie Beveridge	Channel 4
2001	Madame Bovary	Vivien Riley	BBC Two
2001	The League of Gentlemen	Vanessa White	BBC Two
2002	The Way We Live Now	Caroline Noble	BBC One
2002	The Life and Adventures of Nicholas Nickleby	Pamela Haddock	Channel 4
2002	Victoria & Albert	Pat Hay, Stephen Rose	BBC One
2002	The Cazalets	Elaine Smith	BBC One
2003	The Gathering Storm	Daniel Parker, Frances Hannon, Stephen Rose	BBC Two
2003	Alistair McGowan’s Big Impression	Eva Marieges-Moore	BBC One
2003	Daniel Deronda	Caroline Noble	BBC One
2003	White Teeth	Sharon Martin	Channel 4
2004	Little Britain	Lisa Cavalli-Green	BBC Three
2004	Dead Ringers	Kate Benton, Diane Chenery-Wickens	BBC Two
2004	Charles II: The Power and the Passion	Karen Hartley-Thomas	BBC One
2004	The Lost Prince	Liz Tagg	BBC One
2005	Sex Traffic	Caroline Noble	Channel 4
2005	Dead Ringers	Kate Benton, Diane Chenery-Wickens	BBC Two
2005	Absolutely Fabulous (Christmas Special)	Christine Cant	BBC One
2005	Little Britain	Lisa Cavalli-Green	BBC Three
2006	Help	Vanessa White, Neill Gorton	BBC Two
2006	Casanova	Christine Allsopp	BBC Three
2006	Elizabeth I	Fae Hammond	Channel 4
2006	Bleak House	Daniel Phillips	BBC One
2007	Jane Eyre	Anne 'Nosh' Oldham	BBC One
2007	Housewife, 49	Carol Cooper	ITV
2007	A Harlot's Progress	Emma Scott	Channel 4
2007	The Catherine Tate Show	Vanessa White, Neill Gorton	BBC Two
2008	My Boy Jack	Morna Ferguson, Lorraine Glynn	ITV
2008	Cranford	Alison Elliott	BBC One
2008	Oliver Twist	Anne ‘Nosh’ Oldham	BBC One
2008	Rome	Maurizio Silvi	BBC Two
2009	Miss Austen Regrets	Christine Walmesley-Cotham	BBC One
2009	Margaret Thatcher: The Long Walk to Finchley	Christine Allsopp	BBC Four
2009	House of Saddam	Karen Hartley-Thomas	BBC Two
2009	Little Dorrit	Marella Shearer	BBC One

=== 2010s ===
Year	Title	Recipient(s)	Broadcaster
2010	Mo	Christina Baker	Channel 4
2010	The Impressions Show with Culshaw and Stephenson	Lucy Cain	BBC One
2010	Enid	Lisa Cavelli-Green	BBC Four
2010	Red Riding 1974	Jacqueline Fowler	Channel 4
2011	This Is England '86	Catherine Scoble	Channel 4
2011	Eric and Ernie	Christina Baker	BBC Two
2011	Psychoville	Penny Smith	BBC Two
2011	Any Human Heart	Karen Hartley-Thomas	Channel 4
2012	The Crimson Petal and the White	Jacqueline Fowler	BBC Two
2012	Birdsong	Emma Scott	BBC One
2012	Great Expectations	Kirstin Chalmers	BBC One
2012	This Is England '88	Catherine Scoble	Channel 4
2013	Call the Midwife	Christine Walmesley-Cotham	BBC One
2013	The Girl	Nadine Prigge, Neill Gorton, Clinton Aiden Smith	BBC Two
2013	Parade's End	Jan Archibald	BBC Two
2013	Ripper Street	Eileen Buggy, Sharon Doyle	BBC One
2014	An Adventure in Space and Time	Vickie Lang	BBC Two
2014	Burton and Taylor	Lucy Cain	BBC Four
2014	Da Vinci's Demons	Jacqueline Fowler	Fox
2014	Death Comes to Pemberley	Loz Schiavo	BBC One
2015	Penny Dreadful	Enzo Mastrantonio, Nick Dudman, Stefano Ceccarelli	Sky Atlantic
2015	Da Vinci's Demons	Jacqueline Fowler	Fox
2015	Peaky Blinders	Loz Schiavo	BBC Two
2015	Strictly Come Dancing	Lisa Armstrong, Neale Pirie	BBC One
2016	The Dresser	Jenny Shircore	BBC Two
2016	Jonathan Strange & Mr Norrell	Emilie Gauthier, Joyce Dean	BBC One
2016	Penny Dreadful	Enzo Mastrantonio, Nick Dudman, Ferdinando Merolla	Sky Atlantic
2016	Wolf Hall	Roseann Samuel	BBC Two
2017	San Junipero (Black Mirror)	Tanya Lodge	Netflix
2017	War & Peace	Jacqueline Fowler	BBC One
2017	Tracey Ullman's Show	Vanessa White, Floris Schuller, Neill Gorton	BBC One
2017	Victoria	Nic Collins	ITV
2018	Tabboo	Jan Archibald, Erika Ökvist, Audrey Doyle	BBC One
2018	Peaky Blinders	Loz Schiavo	BBC Two
2018	The Miniaturist	Chrissie Baker	BBC One
2018	Gunpowder	Jacqueline Fowler	BBC One
2019	Vanity Fair	Vickie Lang	ITV
2019	A Very English Scandal	Daniel Phillips	BBC One
2019	Mrs Wilson	Konnie Daniel	BBC One
2019	The Little Drummer Girl	Nicole Stafford, Peta Dunstall	BBC One

=== 2020s ===
Year	Title	Recipient(s)	Broadcaster
2020	Peaky Blinders	Loz Schiavo	BBC One
2020	Chernobyl	Daniel Parker, Barrie Gower	Sky Atlantic
2020	Catherine the Great	Kirstin Chalmers	Sky Atlantic
2020	The Trial of Christine Keeler	Inma Azorin	BBC One
2021	Small Axe	Jojo Williams	BBC One
2021	The Crown	Cate Hall	Netflix
2021	I May Destroy You	Bethany Swan	BBC One
2021	The Great	Louise Coles, Sarah Nuth, Lorraine Glynn, Erin Ayanian	StarzPlay
2022	The Witcher	Deb Watson, Barrie Gower, Sarah Gower	Netflix
2022	A Very British Scandal	Catherine Scoble	BBC One
2022	The Nevers	Christine Blundell, Lesa Warrener	HBO/Sky Atlantic
2022	It's a Sin	Lin Davie, Laura Flynn	Channel 4
2023	House of the Dragon	Amanda Knight, Barbie Gower, Rosalia Culora	Sky Atlantic
2023	Dangerous Liaisons	Daniel Parker, Deborah Kenton, Claudia Stolze, Jovana Jovanovic, Wayne Fitzsimmons, Jana Radilová	Lionsgate+
2023	Gangs of London	Helen Speyer	Sky Atlantic
2023	Wednesday	Tara McDonald	Netflix
2024	The Long Shadow (for "Episode 6")	Lisa Parkinson	ITV
2024	The Crown (for "Ritz")	Cate Hall, Emilie Yong-Mills, Fiona Rogers	Netflix
2024	Slow Horses	Lucy Sibbick	Apple TV+
2024	Three Little Birds	Sharon Miller, Kym Menzies-Foster, Kelly Taylor	ITVX
2025	Rivals	Jill Sweeney, Abi Brotherton, Natalie Allan, Tiffany Pierre, Franziska Roesslhuber, Martine Watkins	Disney+
2025	Joan	Nic Collins	ITV1
2025	Mary & George	Paul Gooch, Adam James Phillips, Julia Vernon, Debbi Salmon	Sky Atlantic
2025	Bridgerton	Erika Ökvist	Netflix
2026	Amadeus	Vickie Lang, Nik Williams, Barrie Gower, Attila Vég	Sky Atlantic
2026	Lockerbie: A Search for Truth	Sjaan Gillings	Sky Atlantic
2026	Slow Horses	Lucy Sibbick, Victoria Money	Apple TV
2026	A Thousand Blows	Sian Wilson, Caroline Greenough, Clare Ramsey, Cheryl Garvey, Madlen Mierzwiak	Disney+

== See also ==
- Primetime Emmy Award for Outstanding Contemporary Hairstyling
- Primetime Emmy Award for Outstanding Makeup (Non-Prosthetic)
- Primetime Emmy Award for Outstanding Period and/or Character Hairstyling
- Primetime Emmy Award for Outstanding Period and/or Character Makeup (Non-Prosthetic)
- Primetime Emmy Award for Outstanding Prosthetic Makeup for a Series, Limited Series, Movie or Special
