= Anna Maloney =

British screenwriter

Anna Maloney is a British television screenwriter.

She won the BAFTA for Television Craft: New writer in 2003 for her Channel 4 television drama Falling Apart, based on interviews with women and men who had experienced domestic abuse. The director, Brian Hill, won the BAFTA for Television Craft: New Director - Fiction for the production.

She won the 2017 World Music & Independent Film Festival (WMIFF) award for best screenplay in a short film, for Love Somehow, a film about Caitlin Thomas, adapted from Phil Bowen's The Same Boat.

Her 2020 Safer at Home was one of the Unprecedented series of plays produced by the BBC at the start of the COVID-19 pandemic, for which cast and crew participated remotely.

She won the 2022 CWA Debut Dagger (now the CWA Emerging Author Dagger) for her forthcoming novel The 10.12. It involves a train hijack, a woman who resists it, and the consequences. She had been longlisted for the same award in 2019 for The Right Man.

Maloney has a degree in humanities from the University of Greenwich and an MA in screenwriting from the University of the Arts London. She lives in south east London.
