= Robina Qureshi =

British actress

- Born: 9 December 1964 (age 61); Glasgow, Scotland
- Occupation: Human rights campaigner
- Known for: Housing rights, human rights, migration issues, asylum issues
- Children: 2

Robina Qureshi is a Scottish human rights campaigner. She is a critic of the asylum policies of the United Kingdom, and has campaigned to stop inhumane treatment and close detention centres for asylum seekers.

== Background ==
Qureshi's parents and three older siblings came to Glasgow as immigrants from Pakistan in 1964. She was born in Glasgow later that year. The family lived in the southside and later moved to a suburb in the North West of the city. Her first job was as a trainee employment advice worker, soon after which she realised she wanted to work with minorities.

== Human rights work ==
Qureshi is the chief executive officer of Positive Action in Housing, a Scottish refugee and migrants homelessness and human rights non governmental organisation that is involved in countering racism and discrimination, particularly in housing. She took up this role in 1995. She has publicly highlighted issues concerning racism and ethnic minorities in the print and visual press since 1990.

In 1996, Qureshi's campaign efforts led to the quango Scottish Homes ring fencing £8 million in funding for ethnic minority housing needs in 1996, leading to the creation of new homes and sheltered housing projects in Glasgow.

Between 1998 and 2000, Qureshi, together with the human rights lawyer Aamer Anwar, campaigned on behalf of the family of murdered Indian waiter Surjit Singh Chhokhar. She served on the Lawrence Steering Group and has led campaigns to stop extreme far right groups organising or gaining a platform in Scotland.

In 2000, Qureshi talked to the broadcaster Catherine Deveney about her background and motivation for challenging injustice.

In 2002, she established the UK's first refugee hosting network (Room for Refugees). The programme started in Glasgow when a small number of Iraqi refugees were left destitute without recourse to any form of state support. Room or Refugees went viral in 2015 with the Syrian refugee crisis. It currently has over 20,000 members in response to the growing number of homeless refugees in need of shelter. The network went on to house hundreds of refugees from Syria, Iraq, Iran, Yemen, and Afghanistan, providing a safety net for unaccompanied asylum seekers, women with children, and potential victims of trafficking.

Between 2005 and 2007, Qureshi was a leading voice and activist in the fight against dawn raids on asylum seekers' Glasgow homes between 2005. In September 2005, Qureshi travelled to Albania on a fact-finding mission after taking up the case of a family who were expelled to Kosovo in two separate dawn raids after living in Glasgow for five years as asylum seekers.

Subsequently, she was at the forefront of challenging dawn raids against Scotland's asylum seekers. She called on Scotland's First Minister Jack McConnell to instruct Strathclyde Police not to cooperate with immigration officials who carry out dawn raids. The police, she said, "surely must despise doing the dirty work of the Home Office and the far right". Malcolm Chisholm MSP, Minister for Communities in the Scottish Executive, joined Qureshi in criticising the "heavy-handed" immigration policies,. Chisholm described Qureshi as "a very formidable campaigner and completely dedicated to the rights of minorities."

In November 2007, Qureshi took up the case of 13-year-old Meltem Avcil, a 13-year-old Kurdish girl from Doncaster, who began self-harming after being detained with her mother at Yarl's Wood Immigration Removal Centre and about to be deported. Enlisting the support of the actress Juliet Stevenson, Sir Al Aynsley, Children's Commissioner, and journalists at The Independent newspaper, including Natasha Walter, Qureshi ran a campaign across the UK and Europe to secure Meltem and her mother's release.

In 2014, Qureshi raised funds and successfully gathered public support to bring an Afghan baby Sudais Asif to Glasgow for medical treatment. The little boy suffered severe burns and lost his entire family in a gas explosion in Peshawar, Pakistan.1

In 2015, at the height of media interest in the Syrian refugee crisis, Qureshi spoke out in a heated debate with Sarah Smith against what she described as the BBC's "doublespeak", criticising the BBC's constant references to refugees fleeing war and persecution as migrants.

In 2018, Qureshi led campaigns against the eviction of asylum seekers by Serco, the home Office Asylum Housing contractor.

In 2019, Qureshi was awarded the Sunday Herald's Scotland's Braveheart Award.

Qureshi has been a critic of UK policies on civil liberties, comparing the British Government's attitude towards the threat of homegrown terrorism and the subsequent impact on the Muslim community to the experience of the Irish in 1970s and 1980s Britain. She stated that, "it has been made very clear that the Muslim community should expect to be singled out as potential terrorists. People feel they are being targeted, just like the Irish were by the British in the 1970s and innocent people went to jail. The difference is this time round the names will be Muslim, rather than Irish."

In 2021, Qureshi won the Chartered Institute of Housing's Alan Ferguson Award for Outstanding Contribution to Housing.

In 2022, she led a UK wide campaign to call on the government to allow Ukrainians to enter the UK. This together with public pressure led the UK government to capitulate and allow Ukrainian refugees enter under a sponsorship scheme. Qureshi's charity went onto arrange sponsorship for hundreds of Ukrainian families, individuals and young people.

In March 2024, Qureshi raised over £30,000 to evacuate nine Palestinians from Gaza. Qureshi also spoke out publicly in support of the State of Palestine and called for an end to the occupation. She has spoken unequivocally condemning the killing of all civilians as war crimes and been supportive of Francesca Albanese and Norman Finkelstein.

In June 2024, Qureshi was made "Doctor of the University" by the University of Strathclyde for her contribution to human rights. Commenting on this honour, Qureshi said: "I'm not an establishment person, so when I was asked to accept, I thought they must have got the wrong person. Billy Connolly also got it and he never went to University either. So it's kind of special. I'll use this to fight for others. And right now, all human rights converge on Palestine."

Qureshi has repeatedly condemned the killing of all civilians while supporting Holocaust scholars Raz Segal and Amos Goldberg in referring to the situation in Gaza as a genocide and ethnic cleansing.

== Film work ==
Between 2001 and 2005, Qureshi appeared in several films and television dramas, including American Cousins, Buried, The Key, Proof, and the controversial Gas Attack, for which she won a best actress award at the 2001 Cherbourg-Octeville Festival of Irish & British Film.
