= Unprecedented (TV series) =

UK TV series

- Also known as: Unprecedented: Real Time Theatre From a State of Isolation
- No. of series: 1
- No. of episodes: 5

Production
- Production companies: Headlong; Century Films

Original release
- Network: BBC Four
- Release: 26 May – 28 May 2020
- Network: BBC iPlayer
- Release: 29 May 2020

Unprecedented (originally titled: Unprecedented: Real Time Theatre from a State of Isolation) is a 2020 UK television series first shown on BBC Four.

It comprised 14 short plays, first broadcast in five episodes from 26 May to 29 May 2020. Each play was performed and recorded remotely, during the lockdown caused by the COVID-19 pandemic, and concerned different aspects of life under lockdown. Actors taking part included Geraldine James, Lennie James and Alison Steadman.

== Plays ==
Plays and episodes in Unprecedented
| Episode | Date first broadcast | Title | Writer | Director | Principal cast members |
|---|---|---|---|---|---|
| 1 | 26 May 2020 | Viral | James Graham | Ola Ince | Laurie Kynaston |
| 1 | 26 May 2020 | Penny | Charlene James | Holly Race Roughan | Lennie James |
| 1 | 26 May 2020 | Going Forward | John Donnelly | Blanche McIntyre | Frances Grey |
| 2 | 27 May 2020 | Romantic Distancing | Tim Price | Jeremy Herrin | Arthur Darvill; Inès De Clercq |
| 2 | 27 May 2020 | Safer at Home | Anna Maloney | Brian Hill | Gemma Arterton |
| 2 | 27 May 2020 | House Party | April De Angelis | Holly Race Roughan | Cecilia Noble; Meera Syal |
| 3 | 28 May 2020 | Grounded | Duncan Macmillan | Jeremy Herrin | Katherine Parkinson; Alison Steadman |
| 3 | 28 May 2020 | Fear Fatigue | Prasanna Puwanarajah | Brian Hill | Rory Kinnear; Jodie McNee |
| 4 | 28 May 2020 | Kat and Zaccy | Deborah Bruce | Deborah Bruce | Monica Dolan |
| 4 | 28 May 2020 | The Unexpected Expert | Matilda Ibini | Debbie Hannan | Saida Ahmed; Lucianne McEvoy; Golda Rosheuvel |
| 4 | 28 May 2020 | The Night After | Josh Azouz | Ned Bennett | Kathryn Hunter; Marcello Magni |
| 5 | 29 May 2020 | Central Hill | Nathaniel Martello-White | Nathaniel Martello-White | Julian Barratt; Abraham Popoola; Erin Doherty |
| 5 | 29 May 2020 | Batshit | Jasmine Lee-Jones | Tinuke Craig | Kae Alexander |
| 5 | 29 May 2020 | Everybody's Talkin' | Chloe Moss | Caitlin McLeod | Denise Gough; Sue Johnston; Rochenda Sandall |
