= Child abuse in football =

Abuse of children in the sport

Child abuse in association football refers to instances where children involved in association football, whether as players or in other roles, have been subjected to various forms of abuse, including physical, emotional, and sexual abuse.

Child abuse in football has been reported in different countries and has involved both amateur and professional levels of the sport. The abuse can occur within football clubs, academies, or other football-related organisations, and may involve coaches, staff members, or other individuals in positions of authority. Several high-profile cases have brought attention to the issue and led to investigations, legal actions, and calls for better safeguarding measures within football.

Football governing bodies, such as FIFA and national football associations, have implemented various measures to protect young participants. These measures include enhanced background checks for coaches and staff, the establishment of clear codes of conduct and reporting mechanisms, and mandatory safeguarding training for those involved in youth football. Additionally, independent inquiries and investigations have been conducted to uncover the extent of child abuse in football and to provide recommendations for improved safeguarding practices.

== Overview ==
=== Definition ===
Child abuse in association football or soccer refers to instances where children involved in football, whether as players or in other roles, have been subjected to various forms of abuse, including physical, emotional, and sexual abuse.

Child abuse refers to the physical, sexual, and/ or psychological maltreatment or neglect of a child or children, particularly by a parent or caregiver. It may include any act or failure to act by a caregiver or parent that results in harm, actual or potential, to a child and can occur in a child's home, organisations, schools, or community. Child abuse can take various forms, including physical abuse, sexual abuse, emotional abuse, and neglect.

Different professionals, social and cultural groups, and even different time periods have varying definitions of what constitutes child abuse. Abuse and maltreatment are often used interchangeably, and child maltreatment can be an umbrella term that covers all forms of child abuse and neglect. The definition of child maltreatment depends on cultural values related to children, child development, and parenting. Definitions of child maltreatment can vary among different sectors of society that deal with the issue, such as child protection agencies, legal and medical communities, public health officials, researchers, practitioners, and child advocates.

Abuse usually refers to deliberate acts of commission, while neglect refers to acts of omission. Child maltreatment includes both acts of commission and acts of omission by parents or caregivers that cause actual or threatened harm to a child. Some health professionals and authors consider neglect as part of the definition of abuse, while others do not. Delayed effects of child abuse and neglect, especially emotional neglect, and the diversity of acts that qualify as child abuse are also factors.

The World Health Organization defines child abuse and child maltreatment as "all forms of physical and/ or emotional ill-treatment, sexual abuse, neglect or negligent treatment or commercial or other exploitation, resulting in actual or potential harm to the child's health, survival, development, or dignity in the context of a relationship of responsibility, trust, or power". According to the WHO, violence against children encompasses various types of violence directed towards individuals below the age of 18, irrespective of whether it is inflicted by parents, caregivers, peers, intimate partners, or individuals unknown to the child.

=== Statistics ===
==== Lack of data ====
In general, there is no statistics on child abuse in most of non European countries, including UAE and Iraq. This in some instances stem from the lack of an explicit definition to child abuse. For example,

- Child abuse in China is not explicitly defined in the Chinese law code. The existing laws, such as the Law on the Protection of Minors and the Criminal Law, do not have specific articles on child abuse. Statistics suggest that a significant number of Chinese children have experienced various forms of abuse, including physical abuse, emotional abuse, sexual abuse, and neglect.
- The Sudanese Child Law of 2010 increased the punishment for child molestation which may reach 15 years in prison, but it criminalised sexual abuse without defining it, and the definition typically taken from the Criminal Code.
- The United Arab Emirates does not have a specific criminal offence called "child abuse" but uses the term as a comprehensive description of a range of activities that may or may not constitute criminal offences.
- The Tunisian Penal Code stipulates a penalty for child molestation, and the penalty ranges from two years to 12 years in prison if it is committed by a person who has authority over the victim. Tunisian lawyer, Sabrine Weslati, said in an interview with Al-Hurra website that, "Unfortunately, there are texts that punish sexual harassment in general and children in particular, but there is no law specific to sexual crimes against minor".

In addition, the fear of shame and stigma often acts as a significant barrier for children and families when it comes to reporting child abuse. Victims of child abuse, particularly sexual abuse, may experience a sense of shame and anticipation of stigma, which can lead to non-disclosure and avoidance of seeking help. This fear comes from various factors, including societal attitudes, cultural norms, and concerns about personal and familial reputation. The anticipation of shame and stigma can be even more pronounced in certain communities or cultural contexts where discussing sensitive topics like child abuse is considered taboo or where there is a lack of awareness and understanding about the issue. Also, the fear of ruining family honour often prevents children from speaking out about sexual abuse, further exacerbating the issue of reporting abuse. Also, the fear of shame and several factors prevent an unknown number of victims and their families from receiving or seeking treatment.

==== Available data ====
In Europe, a study conducted by the Edge Hill University and the University of Wuppertal in six European countries, Austria, the Wallonia region of Belgium, Germany, Romania, Spain, and the UK, and involving over 10,000 individuals revealed that three-quarters of children had encountered abuse in sport, with boys being more vulnerable than girls. The research, funded by the European Union, highlighted that abuse is common in non-school sports was psychological, such as a lack of recognition to humiliating treatment. Around 64% of the participants reported experiencing psychological abuse, while 44% had encountered physical violence. Mike Hartill, the lead author of the report from Edge Hill University, emphasised that the findings indicate insufficient efforts by sports governing bodies in Europe to protect children and call for more significant actions beyond mere policy development.

The study focused on individuals aged 18 to 30 who had participated in sports before the age of 18, with the highest incidence of abuse observed among those who had competed internationally, with 84% reporting some form of abuse. Hartill stressed that the potential harm caused by withholding recognition and its potential role in grooming for more severe forms of abuse. The prevalence of abuse varied across countries, with Belgium having the highest incidence at 80% and Austria the lowest at 70%. Notably, except for Austria, in all the countries surveyed, there was a notable increase in the likelihood of boys encountering violence compared to other groups.

In addition, Instances of sexual harassment have been reported among female athletes in Greece, with approximately 32% of female athletes reporting experiences of sexual harassment from male athletes, while 16% reported such incidents involving their coaches.

In Africa, the Committee on Youth, Sport, and Child Matters in Zambia's National Assembly received a petition advocating for stricter laws on child abuse. The 2014 Zambia Violence against Children Survey (VACS), a national survey that examines experiences of physical, sexual, and emotional violence among 13-24-year-olds in Zambia, was conducted revealing that two in five males and two in six females experienced child abuse.

=== Children safeguarding in football ===
FIFA, the international governing body of football, provides guidelines and toolkits for safeguarding children in football. These resources outline steps that football organisations should take to establish safeguarding policies, develop procedures and guidelines, and communicate and educate stakeholders about child protection. Regional football confederations, such as the Asian Football Confederation (AFC), also recognise the significance of child safeguarding and have established policies to ensure the well-being and rights of children involved in football.

The African Union Sport Council (AUSC) has introduced a manual titled "Promoting Safety in African Sport and Sport for Development (S4D) Environments: A Comprehensive Guide for Practitioners, from Policy to Implementation." This manual seeks to ensure the protection of children and vulnerable adults engaged in sports activities in Africa, offering essential insights and resources for professionals working in this field. Additionally, the Confederation of African Football (CAF) has taken steps to ensure the safety and protection of youngsters participating in football activities. CAF has organized safeguarding workshops as part of the CAF African Schools Football Championship.

Union of European Football Associations (UEFA), in collaboration with Terre des hommes, has developed a child safeguarding toolkit for European football associations to protect children from abuse and respond to concerns. Additionally, UEFA and Terre des hommes have conducted in-depth child safeguarding workshops for national football associations, aiming to enhance knowledge and advance child safeguarding practices. The Italian Football Federation (FIGC), UEFA, and Terre des Hommes Italy have actively participated in delivering educational programs to safeguard children and young people from abuse, violence, and discrimination. The UEFA has partnered with Terre des hommes Albania to develop a national child protection policy in Albania, aligning with UEFA's initiative to safeguard children in football.

The Ukrainian Association of Football (UAF), for instance, has approved a Child Safeguarding Policy to create safe conditions for football and children. The UNICEF and the Romanian Football Federation (RFF) initiated programs aimed at combating violence against children. The Greek government has recognised the need for tougher laws to combat sexual abuse and protect minors, as a response to the increasing number of scandals in culture and sport. Programs and initiatives, such as those carried out by Terre des hommes, aim to consolidate policies and protocols in sports and recreation settings, including summer camps, to protect children and prevent abuse.

The Football Association (FA) in England offered safeguarding courses that are football-focused and child-centred, with the goal of increasing awareness and creating a safe and enjoyable football environment for all participants. The FA emphasises the importance of obtaining consent from parents or guardians before involving children in football activities and encourages open communication with children to ensure a positive experience. Over 350,000 individuals have attended these courses.

The Football Association of Ireland (FAI) has acknowledged child welfare issues. It has been in contact with counterparts such as the English Football Association (FA) and the Irish Football Association to improve safeguarding measures.

== Known cases by country ==
=== Afghanistan ===
There have been allegations and investigations related to the physical and sexual abuse of young female players within the Afghanistan Football Federation. Also, Sayed Aghazada, a former Afghan football official, received a five-year ban for his failure to report and prevent the sexual abuse of female players.

=== Argentina ===
In 2018, two of the country's biggest football clubs, River Plate and Club Atlético Independiente, were named in child abuse allegations made by a local Non-governmental organization. It was alleged that young players were forced into prostitution. Three men were held for five months in connection to the scandal but were later released. The Argentine Football Association has vowed to closely monitor boarding houses where youth players live following the scandal involving minors at River Plate and Independiente. In addition, the women's national team coach was accused of sexually harassing and bullying teenage girls as young as 14.

=== Australia ===
The exposure of abuse incidents involving prominent former sports professionals has prompted the initiation of independent inquiries and reviews aimed at addressing the issue of child protection in the realm of sports. One notable case involved a paedophile coach named Darrell Ray, who ran the Saints team for several seasons and abused many players. Football Australia has taken steps to address abuse within the sport and has opted in to allow athletes in top leagues and national teams to bring forward complaints related to alleged abuse, harassment, or bullying. They provide contact details for reporting child abuse allegations, including ACT Police and Child and Youth Protection Services in the Australian Capital Territory.

=== Brazil ===
Brazil has faced a child abuse scandal within its football community, with reports of sexual abuse involving a prestigious football club and its soccer academy. The power of football in Brazil is significant, and speaking out about abuse in the sport requires immense courage, as getting a break in football is often a dream for many families.

=== Democratic Republic of the Congo ===
FIFA's ethics committee has imposed a temporary suspension of five months on Jonathan Bukabakwa, a former football coach, in response to accusations of sexual abuse involving underage individuals. The investigation was prompted by allegations made on various media platforms in November 2022. Bukabakwa is one of several coaches in the country under investigation.

=== France ===
Ahmed G., former amateur football coach, was sentenced to 18 years for sexually abusing and raping young players.

=== Gabon ===
Patrick Assoumou Eyi, a long-serving Under-17 coach in Gabon, has been accused of exploiting young players, grooming, and raping. Eyi was provisionally suspended by the Gabonese Football Federation (Fegafoot) following the allegations. He was subsequently arrested on suspicion of sexual abuse.

Serge Mombo, a well-known football official in Gabon, has faced allegations of sexually exploiting young players and using sex as a prerequisite for securing positions in national teams. FIFA has opened an investigation into the allegations of sexual abuse in Gabonese football, which includes the actions of these coaches and officials.

Pierre-Alain Mounguengui, president of the Gabonese Football Federation (Fegafoot), faced charges of "failure to report crimes of paedophilia," with a report alleged sexual abuse of hundreds of children within the football system. Despite awaiting trial, Mounguengui attended the 2022 FIFA World Cup opening match. Fifpro, International Federation of Professional Footballers, issued a statement expressing concern that photos of Mounguengui being embraced by the president of the Confederation of African Football at the World Cup would discourage victims and whistleblowers from coming forward, as it may put their lives and their families at risk. Mounguengui maintains his innocence. Gabon's sports minister suggested that the victims could be in the hundreds.

=== Greece ===
An Israeli soccer player, who was in Greece at the time, has been arrested due to allegations of engaging in an indecent act with a minor. The player was taken into custody based on the accusations made against him.

=== Iraq ===
In 2018, Alsumaria TV channel investigated and interviewed footballers, revealing the problem's far reach and the stigma that faces the victims. A statement from the Al-Sinaa Club's coach alleged that almost half of the football coaches were accused of sexual abuse. An anonymous football player stated that "in many cases, bloody quarrels took place between the coaches to win one of the handsome players," adding, "The victim becomes more like the private sexual property of the one who signs him, and no one else can approach him." He accused the authorities of being silent about the spread of sexual harassment in fields and stadiums. Muhammad Adnan, the father of a victim, told a tragic story that happened to his son, as he says, "My son entered the dressing room, and then three boys, between the ages of 12 and 15 years old, put him in a corner and felt his body."

=== Iran ===
The Iranian sports ministry faced criticism for its handling of the reports of sexual abuse of minors, with evidence suggesting that they were aware of the abuse for several weeks, with whistleblowers being penalised.

=== Italy ===
Racism in Italian football is a concerning aspect, as it affects players of diverse backgrounds. Incidents of racist abuse directed at players, including young athletes, have been reported. In 2019, a 14-year-old goalkeeper faced racist chants from spectators during a local game in Savona, Liguria.

=== Morocco ===
The General Prosecutor of the King at the Court of Appeal of Settat gave instructions to investigate a case of sexual harassment against a child in a junior football club in Youssoufia Berrechid. This case came to light after the father of one of the practising children in the same school, according to a complaint in which he confirmed that two coaches in a football school harassed his son through pornographic pictures and words.

In 2024, the Public Prosecution opened a child abuse investigation after a father alleged that his son was sexually abused while participating in training event at the Royal Moroccan Football Federation. The Public Prosecution also issued an arrest warrant for the representative of the Sports Association for trying to cover up the abuse.

=== Norway ===
Described by the BBC as the largest sexual abuse case in Norway, a 26-year-old man football referee has been the subject of a years-long investigation and faces charges involving more than 300 boys. The victims, primarily targeted through online interactions in Norway, Sweden, and Denmark, were lured by the man who posed as a girl on chat forums. Gaining their trust, he convinced them to share explicit photos and videos. Subsequently, he allegedly blackmailed them by threatening to expose the material unless they sent more. Reports indicate that he received over 16,000 videos. The charges against him include rape, which stems from the physical abuse of victims whom he met in person. The victims, aged between 9 and 21, mostly felt unable to disclose the abuse to their parents. In 2016, the suspect was initially arrested, released, and later detained again. He was held in jail near Oslo. While his lawyer claimed that he had cooperated with the police and had been undergoing therapy, he had not yet responded to each individual charge. The case was scheduled to be heard in court in 2019.

Another case involved a football coach in Lyngdal, who was later convicted of child abuse.

=== Oman ===
An anonymous Omani footballer told the story of being sexually harassed by one of the club's coaches when he was a teenager, which forced him to migrate to Qatar.

=== Sudan ===
In 2013 in Khartoum, a man was accused of raping a boy and blackmailing him with the rape video. The case revealed that the predator used to frequent a football field in the Burri area, played with children, and then lure them to his house.

In another case, a prison sentence of 3 years and a fine of 1,000 Sudanese pound, and non-payment of imprisonment for two months, for an accused coach who molested two children in Al-Shajara, Khartoum.

=== Tunisia ===
In 2022, DiwanFM reported on allegations of sexual abuse of teenage boys at the Tunisian Football Federation.

=== United Kingdom ===
==== England ====
Child abuse in football in the United Kingdom has garnered widespread attention and led to investigations and reforms. Former professional footballers came forward and publicly disclosed their experiences of being abused by coaches and scouts during the 1970s, 1980s, and 1990s. The revelations led to a surge of further allegations, uncovering a pattern of abuse within football clubs across the UK. Documentaries and series, such as "Football's Darkest Secret," were produced to examine the historic child abuse in youth football across England during the 1970s and 1990s. The scandal had a profound impact on the victims and the broader football community. It encouraged more victims to come forward and disclose instances of non-recent child sexual abuse. Around 429 victims have reported child sexual abuse within UK football clubs.

The scandal prompted a significant response from authorities and organisations within the football community. The FA initiated an independent investigation led by barrister Clive Sheldon QC to examine historical cases of child sexual abuse. The inquiry identified institutional failings and the failure to adequately respond to complaints or rumours of sexual abuse at several professional clubs, including Chelsea, Southampton, Newcastle United, Aston Villa, Crewe Alexandra, Manchester City, Southampton, Stoke City and Peterborough. The scandal and subsequent inquiries shed light on the systemic failures and "institutional failings" within the Football Association. The Sheldon review found significant shortcomings and failures to act appropriately on reports and suspicions of abuse within the football community. In response to this, the FA, Premier League, and leading clubs issued formal apologies and recognised the need for improved child protection measures.

Furthermore, in 2021, Icelandic professional footballer Gylfi Sigurðsson has been under investigation by Greater Manchester Police in the UK on suspicion of sexual child abuse.

==== Scotland ====
There are documented historic sex abuse cases in Scotland especially at Celtic Boys Club and Rangers F.C. While the boys club was not officially affiliated with Celtic FC, several senior figures associated with it have been convicted of sex abuse crimes. Thompsons Solicitors represents over 20 survivors of abuse from the boys club. Despite attempts to engage in discussions with Celtic's lawyers, the club has refused meaningful engagement, leading to the decision to pursue test cases in court. The legal action follows the imprisonment of individuals associated with Celtic Boys Club, such as Jim McCafferty, Frank Cairney, and James Torbett. Celtic FC's CEO, Peter Lawwell, has defended the club's actions, stating that they have conducted their own investigations through an independent lawyer due to legal constraints. The club later apologised. Ahead of a 'class action' court hearing scheduled for October, in September 2023 Celtic FC began negotiations to settle legal claims of historical abuse brought by more than 20 former players.

Malcolm Rodger, a former youth footballer, revealed he was sexually abused by convicted paedophile Barry Bennell after being trafficked from Scotland to England. Rodger disclosed that he was introduced to Bennell by Bill Kelly, another convicted sex offender, and that the abuse took place during a tournament in Spain. He also identified former Celtic Boys' Club coach Jim McCafferty as another perpetrator who abused him. The Independent Review of Sexual Abuse in Scottish Football obtained evidence of trafficking. Scottish Football Association was accused of "blocking justice".

=== Venezuela ===
Venezuelan players have come forward to share accounts of sexual harassment and abuse perpetrated by coach Kenneth Zseremeta. The players have provided detailed descriptions of the misconduct they experienced while under Zseremeta's coaching. The allegations involve various forms of sexual harassment and abuse. In addition to the previous allegations, a teammate has reportedly disclosed that she was subjected to sexual abuse by coach Kenneth Zseremeta since the age of 14.

=== Zimbabwe ===
There have been allegations of sexual harassment and abuse involving female referees and Zimbabwe Football Association (Zifa) officials. The silence and lack of response from Zifa and FIFA regarding these allegations have been criticised.

== See also ==
- PTSD in children and adolescents
