= Football's Darkest Secret =

2021 British TV series

- Official series poster
- Genre: Docuseries
- Directed by: Daniel Gordon
- Starring: David White; Andy Woodward; Paul Stewart
- Country of origin: United Kingdom
- Original language: English
- No. of seasons: 1
- No. of episodes: 3

Production
- Executive producers: John Battsek; Steve Boulton; Ron McCullagh; Jonathan Ossoff
- Producer: Hugh Davies
- Editors: Kevin Konak and Matt Wyllie
- Running time: 59 minutes
- Production companies: Past Curfew and Insight TWI

Original release
- Network: BBC One
- Release: 22 March 2021

Football's Darkest Secret is a three-part documentary series, that aired on BBC One on 22 March 2021, about historical incidents of child abuse in youth football that happened in England from the 1970s to the 1990s.

== Background ==
Football’s Darkest Secret scrutinises the historical incidents of child abuse in youth football throughout England from the 1970s to the 1990s, and the prevailing culture of silence that enveloped it. The series includes survivors sharing their experiences of the abuse they endured during their childhood.

The series starts with "The End of Silence", where footballers like David White, Andy Woodward, Ian Ackley, Dean Radford, Dion Raitt, and Paul Stewart speaking out. The second episode, "Missed Opportunities" probes into how chances were overlooked to stop sexual predators in youth football years ago. The last episode, "The Reckoning" follows the court trials of high-profile abusers and questions the form of justice that could be served for the men whose lives have been shattered.

The series has been highly rated. It was shortlisted for the 2022 British Academy Television Craft Awards for the Best Emerging Talent: Factual category, and Broadcast Awards for the Best Documentary Series category.

== See also ==
- United Kingdom football sexual abuse scandal
- Sexual abuse cases at Crewe Alexandra F.C.
- Child abuse in association football
