= British Academy Television Craft Awards =

Annual British television awards

- Current: 2026 British Academy Television Craft Awards
- Awarded for: "to recognise, honour and reward individuals for outstanding achievement in television craft."
- Country: United Kingdom
- Presented by: British Academy of Film and Television Arts (BAFTA)
- First award: 20 April 2000; 26 years ago (for productions of 1999)
- Website: www.bafta.org
- Related: British Academy Television Awards

The British Academy Television Craft Awards is an accolade presented by the British Academy of Film and Television Arts (BAFTA), a charitable organisation established in 1947, which: "supports, promotes and develops the art forms of the moving image – film, television and video games – by identifying and rewarding excellence, inspiring practitioners and benefiting the public."

Having previously been handed out with the British Academy Television Awards, the awards were established in 2000 with their own, separate ceremony as a way to spotlight technical achievements, without being overshadowed by the production categories.

== Rules ==
To be eligible for nomination, programmes must be: broadcast in the UK between the eligibility period, on terrestrial, cable, satellite or digital channels; both a financial and creative contribution in the case of an international programme, and have its first broadcast in the UK; an entry for the television awards first (not previously entered for the film or children's awards). The top six programmes and/or individuals in each category are chosen by television voting members and Chapter members in three rounds, to make up the jury shortlist. The shortlist then goes forward to a jury, who decides the top four final nominees and the winners.

== Ceremonies ==
In the following table, the years correspond to the year the ceremony took place, and are held for achievements of the previous year (e.g. the 2000 awards are celebrated for television productions of 1999).

Year	Date	Venue	Location	Host	Ref(s)
2000	30 April	195 Piccadilly	Westminster	Gabby Logan	
2001	22 April	Sadler's Wells Theatre	Islington	Liza Tarbuck	
2002	12 May	Savoy Hotel	Westminster	Harry Enfield	
2003	11 May	The Dorchester	Mayfair	Alistair McGowan	
2004	16 May	The Dorchester	Mayfair	Alistair McGowan	
2005	8 May	The Dorchester	Mayfair	Jon Culshaw	
2006	19 May	The Dorchester	Mayfair	Jon Culshaw	
2007	22 April	The Dorchester	Mayfair	Jon Snow	
2008	11 May	The Dorchester	Mayfair	Claudia Winkleman	
2009	17 May	Hilton Hotel, London	Mayfair	Alexander Armstrong	
2010	23 May	Hilton Hotel, London	Mayfair	Christine Bleakley	
2011	8 May	The Brewery	City of London	Stephen Mangan	
2012	13 May	The Brewery	City of London	Alan Davies	
2013	28 April	The Brewery	City of London	Stephen Mangan	
2014	27 April	The Brewery	City of London	Stephen Mangan	
2015	26 April	The Brewery	City of London	Stephen Mangan	
2016	24 April	The Brewery	City of London	Stephen Mangan	
2017	23 April	The Brewery	City of London	Stephen Mangan	
2018	22 April	The Brewery	City of London	Stephen Mangan	
2019	28 April	The Brewery	City of London	Stephen Mangan	
2020	17 July	Virtual		Stephen Mangan	
2021	24 May	Virtual		Gbemisola Ikumelo	
2022	24 April	The Brewery	City of London	Mel Giedroyc	
2023	23 April	The Brewery	City of London	Mel Giedroyc	
2024	28 April	The Brewery	City of London	Stacey Dooley	
2025	27 April	The Brewery	City of London	Stacey Dooley	
2026	26 April	The Brewery	City of London	Maisie Adam	

== Categories ==
=== Current awards ===
As of 2021, the awards include twenty-one competitive categories:

- Costume Design
- Director: Factual
- Director: Fiction
- Director: Multi-Camera
- Editing: Factual
- Editing: Fiction
- Emerging Talent: Factual
- Emerging Talent: Fiction
- Entertainment Craft Team
- Make-Up & Hair Design
- Original Music
- Photography: Factual
- Photography & Lighting: Fiction
- Production Design
- Scripted Casting
- Sound: Factual
- Sound: Fiction
- Special, Visual & Graphic Effects
- Titles & Graphic Identity
- Writer: Comedy
- Writer: Drama

A Special Award is also presented, at the discretion of the Television Committee, which "honour[s] an individual or a team of craftspeople for outstanding creative contribution in the craft sector."

=== Discontinued awards ===
- Originality (from 1986 to 1999)
- Innovation (from 2000 to 2002)
- New Media Developer (from 2006 to 2007)
- Interactive Innovation (from 2006 to 2010)
- Digital Creativity (from 2011 to 2017)
