= White (TV series) =

2008 documentary series

- Country of origin: United Kingdom

Original release
- Network: BBC Two
- Release: March 2008

White is a series of documentaries shown in March 2008 on BBC 2 dealing with issues of race and the changing nature of the white working class in Britain. The series alleged that some white working class Britons felt marginalised and poses the question, "Is white working class Britain becoming invisible?"

== Episodes ==
=== Last Orders ===
This documentary by Henry Singer looks at a working men's club, Wibsey Working Men's Club, in Bradford and the way in which it feels threatened by immigration which has increased the local Asian populations as well as allegations that they are prioritised for services.

It also examines the effect that the government ban on smoking in public places and the availability of cheap alcohol in urban pubs have had on the viability of the club. The documentary highlights the alienation which these working class voters feel from the Labour Party.

=== Rivers of Blood ===
This documentary looks at Enoch Powell's Rivers of Blood speech on the 40th anniversary of its delivery. The documentary charts sacking from the Cabinet of Edward Heath after the controversial speech which predicted violence on the streets of Britain and which quoted Roman poet Virgil's prophecy: "I see the Tiber foaming with much blood".

The documentary also examines the effect of the speech on Britain's immigration policy.

=== White Girl ===
This drama by Abi Morgan is about an eleven-year-old English girl who becomes interested in Islam. The drama centres on a culture clash when a working class family from Leeds move to an otherwise all-Asian neighbourhood in Bradford. 11-year-old Leah (Holly Kenny) and mum Debbie (Anna Maxwell Martin) move after a family relationship breaks down.

Leah becomes friends with an Asian girl, Yasmin. However, rows begin when Leah comes home one day wearing a hijab.

=== The Poles are Coming! ===
This documentary by Tim Samuels looks at the attitudes of working class Britain's to their recent East European arrivals. The documentary is set in Peterborough and looks at the strain on public services and the effect on the local economy of thousands of new immigrants.

The documentary contrasts the positive attitude employers have to the Polish immigrants to that of working class youths who accuse the new arrivals of taking their employment.

The effect on Eastern Europe itself is also examined. It is revealed that Poland is struggling to build stadiums for the Euro 2012 Championship because of the skills drain.

Despite the programme's title, it is not only Poles who have migrated to the city in large numbers in recent years, and the documentary shows that foreigners from other Eastern European countries, along with Asian immigrants, have swelled the population of that formerly small city. In parts of Peterborough, including Millfield, English people are the minority. The documentary included scenes at a primary school at which only one pupil spoke English as his first language – the vast majority of the children were Eastern Europeans and Asians.

=== The Primary ===
This documentary is on Welford Primary School in Handsworth, Birmingham, which has pupils from 17 nationalities.

Head teacher Chris Smith attempts to make pupils aware of the many nationalities and cultures.

=== All White in Barking ===
This documentary by Marc Isaacs is on the area of Barking and Dagenham, in outer East London, which has recently seen some of the highest levels of immigration in the United Kingdom, and, as a result, is the borough with the highest number of BNP councillors in the UK. The activities of an activist for the British National Party are also analysed.

One of the people featured was a middle-aged white man, originally from Bow but who had moved a few miles east to Barking, who was horrified that many of his English neighbours had been recently replaced by various foreigners, and that his daughter had a child by a very violent Nigerian immigrant. The father and his daughter explained how she and her child have to live in protected, secure housing, as it is the only way to escape the Nigerian and his savagery. At the end of the documentary, the Englishman moves to (the much whiter) Canvey Island, Essex.

== Controversy ==
The series prompted allegations of racism due to this image of a white face being written on upon until it is unrecognisable. During the advertisement Billy Bragg could be heard singing "Jerusalem".

=== Allegations of racism ===
Allegations of racism emerged after the trailer for the series was shown where a white face was covered in writing until it disappeared under a mass of ink. It read 'Britain is changing' in many languages.

In an interview the BBC 2 controller Roly Keating responded:

"I absolutely refute that it is at all racist. It's clearly arresting. It denotes to audiences that they will find certain elements of this season challenging. Part of the point of the BBC is to stimulate public debate."

=== Allegations of stereotyping ===
The series also gained criticism for the portrayal it gave to white working class Britons. Sarah Mukherjee, an environment correspondent at the BBC, argued that the series reinforced stereotypes that the white working class were violent, racist and lived on benefits.

The BBC's commissioning editor, Richard Klein, stated that the commissioning of the series was in response to a report which showed that white working class voices rarely made it onto TV, and that when they were shown, they were portrayed as "chavs" and "white trash".
