= Roger Williams (playwright) =

Welsh playwright and screenwriter

Roger Williams (born 1974) is a Welsh playwright and screenwriter working in both English and Welsh. His work often examines aspects of modern Welsh life, such as the place of minority languages, the plight of declining industrial communities and the Cardiff gay scene.

He was born at Newport, Wales, and brought up in Carmarthen. He graduated in 1995 from the University of Warwick with a degree in English and American Literature.

His theatre work includes:

- Surfing, Carmarthen Bay (1995)
- Love in Aberdare (1997)
- Gulp (1997)
- Calon Lân (1997)
- Saturday Night Forever (1998)
- Killing Kangaroos (1999)
- Pop (2000)
- Y Byd (A'i Brawd) (2004)
- Me, a Giant (2005)
- Mother Tongue (2005)
- Kapow! (2006)
- Tir Sir Gâr (2013)

In 2002, his work Tales from the Pleasure Beach, screened on BBC Two, was nominated for a BAFTA Award in the Best Drama Series category. He has also written episodes of Hollyoaks (Channel 4), The Story of Tracy Beaker (BBC), The Bench (BBC Wales), Citizens! (BBC Wales) and many episodes of the daily Welsh-language soap opera Pobol y Cwm which is broadcast on S4C. In 2006, he became the lead writer of S4C's popular new drama series Caerdydd, for which he won a Bafta in 2011.

In 2012 he established the production company Joio. The company's first production was the film Tir for S4C. The film was adapted from Roger Williams's original theatre play Tir Sir Gâr for which he won the Best Welsh language Playwright award at the Wales Theatre Critics Awards 2014.

Williams created and wrote the bilingual English/Welsh crime drama television series Bang (TV series), first broadcast on S4C in 2017. Bang won the Celtic Media Festival award for Best Drama series and a New York Film and TV Festivals medal of excellence.

Roger is the writer and producer of the horror movie The Feast(Gwledd) which had its world premiere in South by Southwest in 2021. The film won awards at festivals across the world including Motel X, Neuchatel International Fantastic Film Festival and Bucheon International Fantastic Film Festival. It was premiered in the UK at the London Film Festival. The film is represented by sales agents Bankside and was distributed in the USA by IFC Films. It was distributed by Picturehouse in the UK and was sold to other territories across Europe.

Roger is also the writer and producer of the film Y Sŵn which tells the story of the campaign to establish a Welsh language television channel. The film was distributed across the UK and played at festivals in countries including Poland, France and the US. The film won the BAFTA Cymru award for Best Film in 2022 and the BAFTA Cymru award for Editing.
