= Henry Singer =

- Born: 1957 (age 67–68); United States
- Education: Harvard University; University of Cambridge
- Occupation: Film director

Henry Singer is a documentary filmmaker. Born in 1957, he holds a bachelor's degree from Harvard University and a master's degree from Cambridge University. He produced the documentary 9/11: The Falling Man which dealt with the attempts to name an individual who jumped to his death from the World Trade Center following the 9/11 attacks. His work has a BAFTA nomination and a New York film festival gold medal.

He produced the documentary Last Orders as part of the BBCs White season.

Singer's The Blood of the Rose won the Green Award at Sheffield Doc/Fest.

== See also ==
- Trial of Ratko Mladić
