= Marc Isaacs =

British documentary filmmaker

Marc Isaacs is a British documentary filmmaker, living in London. His short film Lift (2001), which showed people using a lift in a tower block, was nominated for a BAFTA.

"Many of his 14 films to date have explored the divisions within the so-called 'United' Kingdom. He has probed multicultural life in London, traditionalist seaside backwaters, asylum-seekers and ex-pats in Calais, while venturing to Barking to gather white residents' attitudes towards their immigrant neighbours." Mike McCahill, in The Guardian, described Isaacs as a "people person, locating strangeness, melancholy and joy in the urban landscape, and those who inhabit it."

== Early life and education ==
Isaacs was born in the East End of London and grew up there in Redbridge. He studied at the University of East London.

== Filmmaking ==
Some of his early work included assisting on Paweł Pawlikowski's films Twockers (1998) and Last Resort (2000).

For his film Lift (2001), Isaacs spent "weeks filming people getting in and out of a lift" in a tower block.

Calais: The Last Border (2003) "weaves portraits of various individuals [. . .] into a moving and melancholy overview of a port defined more than ever by the island it gazes at across the Channel."

All White in Barking (2007) is an exploration of disparate attitudes on race in the London Borough of Barking and Dagenham. it was included in the BBC documentary series White.

For Outside the Court (2011), "Isaacs spent three months buttonholing smokers outside Highbury magistrates court, often interrupting them over their last fag before they went to meet their juridical fates."

The Road: A Story of Life & Death (2012) is a "documentary about immigrants living at the London end of the A5".

Outsiders (2014) is "set in a single location—the inside of a burger truck—this story unfolds as passersby answer Marc's questions while they slurp tea and eat bacon sandwiches. The result is an illuminating blend of anxiety and insecurity as attitudes towards outsiders begin to shine a light on why England is going through such politically turbulent times."

The Men Who Sleep in Trucks (2016) depicts isolation and loneliness in Britain's truck drivers "sleeping in their own trucks in lay-by car parks and service stations".

The Filmmaker's House (2020) is a docufiction that "tackles Brexit and the future of a multicultural Britain head-on. [. . .] set over a day in Isaacs's comfortable family terraced home in Walthamstow, northeast London. It gathers strangers from various backgrounds who all live in its orbit".

This Blessed Plot (2023), also a docufiction, blurs "factual observation and playful fabrication, history and folklore, past and present". It premiered at the 2023 Doclisboa documentary film festival.

== Reception ==
Mike McCahill, film critic in The Guardian, described Isaacs as a "people person, locating strangeness, melancholy and joy in the urban landscape, and those who inhabit it."

In an article for the British Film Institute, Isabel Stevens wrote that

"many of his 14 films to date have explored the divisions within the so-called 'United' Kingdom. He has probed multicultural life in London, traditionalist seaside backwaters, asylum-seekers and ex-pats in Calais, while venturing to Barking to gather white residents' attitudes towards their immigrant neighbours."

Corin Douieb, writing in Aesthetica in 2012 about the films All White in Barking, Men of the City and The Road, described Isaacs as having "continued to cast his eye over the maligned and tell their bleak stories".

== Filmography ==
- Lift (2001) – documentary short; directed and cinematography by Isaacs
- Travellers (2003) – TV movie documentary; directed and cinematography by Isaacs
- Calais: The Last Border (2003) – TV movie documentary; directed, cinematography, and produced by Isaacs
- Philip and His Seven Wives (2005) – documentary; directed and cinematography by Isaacs
- Someday My Prince Will Come (2005) – TV movie documentary; directed, cinematography, and produced by Isaacs
- All White in Barking (2007) – documentary; written, directed and cinematography by Isaacs
- Men of the City (2009) – documentary; written, directed and cinematography by Isaacs
- Outside the Court (2011) – TV movie documentary; 1 hour, directed and cinematography by Isaacs
- The Old Man and His Bed (2011) – short; directed by Isaacs
- The Road: A Story of Life & Death (2012) – documentary; written, directed and cinematography by Isaacs, produced as part of the BBC's Storyville
- Outsiders (2014) – short; directed by Isaacs
- The Men Who Sleep in Trucks (2016) – documentary short; written, directed and produced by Isaacs
- Touched by Murder (2016) – short; directed by Isaacs
- Sisters (2017) – short; directed by Isaacs
- Rainy Days (2017) – short; directed by Isaacs
- Notes on Bangladesh (2017) – short; directed by Isaacs
- Moments of Silence (2017) – short; directed and edited by Isaacs
- The Filmmaker's House (2020) – docufiction; written, directed, cinematography, edited and produced by Isaacs
- This Blessed Plot (2023) – docufiction; 75 mins

== Awards ==
- 2002: Lift was nominated for "Best New Director – Factual" at BAFTA's 2002 British Academy Television Craft Awards

== Publications with contributions by Isaacs ==
- This Much is True: 14 Directors on Documentary Filmmaking. London: A & C Black, 2012. ISBN 978-1408132531. Includes an interview with Isaacs. (Note: A transcript of the interview is here within Isaacs' site.)

== DVD and Blu-ray releases ==
- Marc Isaacs Collection: Lift / Travellers / Calais: The Last Border: Three Films by Marc Isaacs (Second Run, 2009) – DVD
- Marc Isaacs Collection: All White in Barking / Men of the City: Two Films by Marc Isaacs (Second Run, 2010) – DVD
- The Road: A Story of Life and Death (2013) – DVD
- Marc Isaacs Collection: Someday My Prince Will Come / Philip and His Seven Wives (Second Run, 2017) – DVD
- From Lift to The Road The Films of Marc Isaacs (Second Run, 2018) – Blu-ray
