= 2002 British Academy Television Craft Awards =

Technical achievements in television awards ceremony

3rd British Academy Television Craft Awards
- Date: 12 May 2002
- Site: Savoy Hotel, Westminster, UK
- Hosted by: Harry Enfield

The British Academy Television Craft Awards of 2002 are presented by the British Academy of Film and Television Arts (BAFTA) and were held on 12 May 2002 at the Savoy Hotel, Westminster, the ceremony was hosted by Harry Enfield.

== Winners and nominees ==
Winners will be listed first and highlighted in boldface.

Best New Director - Fiction	Best New Director - Factual
**Tales from Pleasure Beach – Edmund Coulthard**; Teachers – Richard Dale; Hearts and Bones – Brian Kirk; Sweet Revenge – David Morrissey	**Witness: The Train – Donovan Wylie**; Alt TV: Lift – Marc Isaacs; Me And My Dad – Penny Jagessar; The Alcohol Years – Carol Morley
Best New Writer	Best Original Television Music
**Rob Dawber – The Navigators**; Daniel Brocklehurst – Clocking Off; Richard Cottan – Men Only; Rowan Joffe – Gas Attack	**The Blue Planet – George Fenton**; The Way We Live Now – Nicholas Hooper; Perfect Strangers – Adrian Johnston; The Lost World – Rob Lane
Best Costume Design	Best Production Design
**The Life And Adventures Of Nicholas Nickleby – Barbara Kidd**; Othello – Les Lansdown; Love in a Cold Climate – Mike O'Neill; The Cazalets – Frances Tempest	**The Way We Live Now – Gerry Scott**; The Life And Adventures Of Nicholas Nickleby – James Merifield; Love in a Cold Climate – Gerry Scott; Othello – Malcolm Thornton
Best Photography and Lighting - Fiction	Best Photography - Factual
**Othello – Daf Hobson**; Perfect Strangers – Cinders Forshaw; Clocking Off – Peter Greenhalgh; The Way We Live Now – Chris Seager	**The Blue Planet – Photography Team**; Fire, Plague, War And Treason: The Great Plague – Simon Bray; Wild Africa – Photography Team; Wildlife: Grizzly - Face To Face (Special) – Jeff Turner
Best Editing - Fiction/Entertainment	Best Editing - Factual
**Othello – Nick Arthurs**; The Way We Live Now – Mark Day; Clocking Off – Mark Elliott, Edward Mansell, Tony Cranstoun; Perfect Strangers – Paul Tothill	**The Show Must Go On – Anna Ksiezopolska**; The Blue Planet – Jo Payne, Tim Coope, Alan Hoida, Martin Elsbury; Kumbh Mela: The Greatest Show On Earth – Editing Team; Joined: The World Of Siamese Twins – Paul Van Dyck
Best Make-Up and Hair Design	Best Visual Effects and Graphic Design
**The Way We Live Now – Caroline Noble**; The Life And Adventures Of Nicholas Nickleby – Pamela Haddock; Victoria & Albert – Pat Hay, Stephen Rose; The Cazalets – Elaine Smith	**Banzai – Blue Source**; Building The Impossible: The Seven Wonders Of The Ancient World – Atlantic Digital; The Lost World – William Bartlett, Virgil Manning, Darren Byford; Walking with Beasts – Tim Greenwood, Max Tyrie, Jez Gibson-Harris, Mike Milne
Best Sound - Entertainment	Best Sound - Factual
**Clocking Off – Sound Team**; Othello – Maurice Hillier, Colin Martin, Laura Lovejoy, Peter Bond; The Lost World – Sound Team; The Way We Live Now – Sound Team	**Hell in the Pacific – Peter Eason, Craig Butters, Cliff Jones**; Walking With Beasts – Kenny Clark, Jovan Ajder, Chris Burdon; Walk On By: The Story Of Popular Song – Peter Davies, Paul Cowgill, Ravi Gurnam, Jane Barnett; The Blue Planet – Sound Team

=== Special awards ===
- **BBC Natural History**
- **Edward Mansell**

== See also ==
- 2002 British Academy Television Awards
