= Child abuse in China =

Child abuse in China is the maltreatment, neglect, or exploitation of children, encompassing physical abuse, emotional abuse, sexual abuse, and child labor.

== Legal status ==
=== Laws ===
The Law of the People's Republic of China on Protection of Minors (Chinese: 未成年人保护法) and the criminal law of China (Chinese: 刑法) do not address the subject of child abuse. Article 49 of the current Chinese Constitution, however, forbids the physical abuse of elderly people, women, and children. According to Wang Shengjun, former president of the Supreme People's Court of the People's Republic of China, China does not have a specific law protecting the welfare of children. Although statutes have been passed concerning child abuse, and there are more than 30 organisations within the Chinese government in which child protection is referenced, they lack a systematic codification as none have been established specifically to tackle child abuse.

=== Initiatives ===
In 2019, China announced plans to build a national database of sex offenders against minors. It also issued new guidelines for educators, with a lifetime ban from teaching recommended for the sexual harassment of students. In 2021, China announced a mandatory reporting system to improve the prosecution of such crimes.

Further procedures address how schools and government agencies deal with individuals subject to disqualification from working with children. In 2022, China’s supreme court and justice agencies issued the Opinions on Implementing the System of Occupational Disqualification, which translate to Rules for Professional Disqualifications in American and British English. The rules regulate how teachers and other educational staff with criminal records should be barred from working with children. They require courts to professionally disqualify educators who commit felonies such as sexual assault, abuse, human trafficking, or violent crimes against minors, and to provide mandatory notification to education agencies to revoke or deny teaching licenses or certifications. Under the rules, prosecutors' offices are obligated to recommend professional disqualification during prosecution and to oversee whether schools and other educational institutions perform thorough criminal background checks and enforce employment disqualifications.

=== Punishments ===
Currently, a large number of child abuse incidents in China have not been adjudicated. Further, punishments have typically been lenient, including 5-day detentions for offenders. These detentions are executed according to the public security administration penal code (Chinese: 治安管理处罚法) which does not have the regulatory authority to enforce the protection of children. Article 45 of the aforementioned law refers to the detention of the abusers of family members who are requested to be prosecuted by their family members.

== Traditional values and consequences ==
The prevalence of Confucianism in Chinese culture, where many of China's traditional values are derived, has led to legal ambiguity regarding child abuse. Within Confucianism, children are expected to show extreme devotion towards their parents. Confucians believed that familial figures would one day become powerful spirits, and hence should be honored accordingly. Filial piety is also emphasized through the notion that the collective family takes precedence over any individual rights. According to a 2017 paper by Fang Zhao and colleagues, "most young couples are willing to live with their ageing parents or parents-in-law", which "shows that traditional values are still quite prevalent among the current younger generation in China".

These traditional beliefs have complicated Chinese policy on child abuse. According to Confucianism, it is the responsibility of the parents to decide how they wish to raise and discipline their children. The notion of the family as the biggest priority further hinders the government from separating children from their families. In traditional Chinese society "anyone with a family was thought to have his or her basic life needs satisfied, and only the homeless and those from poverty-stricken families would be identified as needing social services". These factors make it difficult to establish a functional child protective service, as children who are not impoverished are not seen as needing assistance.

According to a systematic review published in the Bulletin of the World Health Organization in 2015, of the 400 million children in China, 26.6% had suffered physical abuse, 19.6% emotional abuse, 8.7% sexual abuse, and 26% neglect.

The "Reform and Opening Up" policy that started in the late 1970s has made cities in China flourish. Yet, poverty is still prevalent in rural areas and, "to help families get rid of adverse circumstances, many young adults leave rural residences for cities in pursuit of better salaries, leaving their children at home". Because of this, there has been a group of left-behind children (LBC) in rural China. Parents will travel to the city out of a desperate need to provide for their families, but having little to no contact with one's parents leaves a child especially vulnerable to mental health issues. Tian states: "According to the released data in 2013 by All China Women's Federation, the number of LBC had climbed to a staggering 61 million, accounting for 37.7% of the rural children and 21.9% of the total Chinese children".

This is a problem because, according to Tian, children with little to no parental support are more likely to participate in, or experience, self-harm (SH), depression, and suicidal thoughts or attempts. He states that "children with less perceived family support had higher incidence and severe SH behaviors". With their parents gone, LBCs are far more likely to exhibit such behaviors. "Existing studies highlight the importance of SH in suicide, as it has been estimated that approximately 50–60% of suicidal deaths were coupled with a history of SH, and SH adolescents reported a threefold risk of suicidal ideation (SI) compared with their non-SH counterparts". LBC are at a heightened risk of depression, SH, and suicidal thoughts.

== Gender differences ==
A study published in 2021 found that "boys in rural China have a higher rate of abuse compared to girls as a whole, while girls are at a higher risk of experiencing neglect". It would seem that boys and girls tend to suffer in different ways, due to gender roles in a Confucian society: "Rural boys are expected to take more responsibility for family prosperity in Confucian society, whereas it is thought that most girls will leave home after they are married, so higher expectations tend to cause more physical or verbal punishment for boys." In traditional Chinese culture, the parents' livelihood depends on their son's ability to support them when they can no longer work.

When it comes to the reasons why girls seem to be affected more by neglect than other types of abuse, the answer is more complicated: "In rural China, girls' emotional neglect may come not only from girls' characteristics of being sensitive, fragile, and precocious but also from the insufficient attention and limited resources they receive from their families ... Confucian culture regards tolerance and understanding as virtues inherent to women, which will also reduce girls' willingness to externalize their pressure and strengthen their feelings of loneliness".

After several violent cases were brought to light, continual backlash from both the general public and netizens caused the courts in late 2018 to toughen sentences for offenders.

== Sexual abuse against minors ==
According to the China Daily, "between 2010 and 2013, national prosecutors accused 8,069 suspects of obscene behavior involving minors in 7,963 cases, and have charged 255 people with sexually abusing young girls in 150 cases." The China Daily quoted a law professor as saying: "Because of the lack of sex education, some juveniles may not even realize they have been sexually abused".

In 2019, China announced a series of efforts, including a national database of offenders and potential lifetime bans from teaching, to tackle sex crimes against children.

In 2020, over 80 former students came out against a teacher and later administrator at an international school in Sichuan for sexually harassing them, leading to his arrest. A case involving a businessman who had allegedly sexually assaulted his foster daughter raised calls for a more clearly defined age of consent.

From 2018 to 2022, 290,000 individuals were charged with crimes against minors, of which 131,000 were prosecuted for sexual offenses such as rape and child molestation. 41% of those prosecuted received a prison sentence of more than three years, 23.9% higher than the average for criminals overall. In addition, 700 people who failed to report crimes against minors were punished. 2,503 centers have been set up in China to handle sexual abuse cases against minors.

== Child labor ==
Child labor is a social issue in China. In October 2018, a study was conducted based on data from the China Family Panel Studies. The study found that about 7.74% of children aged 10 to 15 worked in 2010, and a positive correlation was observed between child labor and school dropout rates. The study found that on average, a child who works 6.75 hours a day has 6.42 fewer hours to study compared to other children.

== See also ==
- Child abuse
- Child labor
- Filial piety
