= 2003 British Academy Television Craft Awards =

Technical achievements in television awards ceremony

4th British Academy Television Craft Awards
- Date: 11 May 2003
- Site: The Dorchester, Mayfair, UK
- Hosted by: Alistair McGowan

The British Academy Television Craft Awards of 2003 are presented by the British Academy of Film and Television Arts (BAFTA) and were held on 11 May 2003 at The Dorchester, Mayfair, the ceremony was hosted by Alistair McGowan.

== Winners and nominees ==
Winners will be listed first and highlighted in boldface.

Best New Director - Fiction	Best New Director - Factual
**Brian Hill – Falling Apart**; Giacamo Campiotti – Dr Zhivago; Mark Nunneley – 15 Storeys High; Minkie Spiro – Holby City	**Alice Yglesias – Death**; Mark Elliott – Barbarians: Secrets Of The Dark Ages; Giles Llewellyn-Thomas – The Mystery Of The Three Kings; Jamie O’Leary – Teenage Dwarf
Best New Writer	Best Original Television Music
**Anna Maloney – Falling Apart**; Matt Greenhalgh – Clocking Off; Charlie Martin – Teachers; Ed Roe – Teachers	**The Forsyte Saga – Geoffrey Burgon**; The Gathering Storm – Howard Goodall; Tipping The Velvet – Adrian Johnston and Terry Davies; Spooks – Jennie Muskett
Best Costume Design	Best Production Design
**Shackleton – Shirley Russell**; The Gathering Storm – Jenny Beavan; Daniel Deronda – Mike O'Neill; Dr Zhivago – Annie Symons	**The Gathering Storm – Luciana Arrighi**; Shackleton – Michael Howells; Foyle’s War – Claire Kenny And Maurice Cain; White Teeth – Alice Normington
Best Photography and Lighting - Fiction	Best Photography - Factual
**Bloody Sunday – Ivan Strasburg**; Shackleton – Henry Braham; White Teeth – David Odd; Daniel Deronda – Fred Tammes	**Sahara with Michael Palin – Nigel Meakin**; The Life of Mammals – Camera Team; The Natural World: In Search Of Killer Ants – Martin Dohrn; Edwardian Country House – Chris Hartley
Best Editing - Fiction/Entertainment	Best Editing - Factual
**Daniel Deronda – Philip Kloss**; Shackleton – Peter Coulson; Bloody Sunday – Clare Douglas; Spooks – Colin Green	**SAS Embassy Siege – Peter Norrey**; The Life of Mammals – Editing Team; Edwardian Country House – Martin Johnson And Joanna Lincoln; Faking It – Mark Knowles
Best Make-Up and Hair Design	Best Graphic Design
**The Gathering Storm – Daniel Parker, Frances Hannon, Stephen Rose**; Alistair McGowan’s Big Impression – Eva Marieges-Moore; White Teeth – Sharon Martin; Daniel Deronda – Caroline Noble	**The Dinosaur Hunters – Burrell Durrant Hifle**; Banzai Jubilee Special – Blue Source; Great Britons – Burrell Durrant Hifle; The Life of Mammals – Mick Connaire, Andrew Power and David Corfield
Best Sound - Entertainment	Best Sound - Factual
**Daniel Deronda – Sound Team**; Hound of the Baskervilles – Clive Copland, Paul Hamblin, Lee Crichlow, Becki Ponting; Later With Jools Holland – Mike Felton; Bloody Sunday – Sound Team	**The Queen’s Golden Jubilee – Sound Team**; Wild Weather – Jovan Ajder, Simon Pinkerton, Dan Gable; Sahara with Michael Palin – John Pritchard, George Foulgham; The Queen Mother’s Funeral – Sound Team
Best Visual Effects
**Walking With Dinosaurs: The Giant Claw Special – Max Tyrie, Tim Greenwood, Jez Gibson-Harris**; Hornblower – Phil Attfield; Dinotopia – Mike McGee, Michael Eames, Alec Knox; How The Twin Towers Collapsed – Red Vision

=== Special awards ===
- **Carl Davis**

== See also ==
- 2003 British Academy Television Awards
