= Phil Bowen =

British writer (born 1949)

- Born: 1949

Philip Hugh Bowen (born 1949) is a British poet, playwright, performer, teacher and biographer. He grew up in Liverpool, where he taught from 1972 to 1979. During the 1980s, he was a publican before becoming a full-time writer in 1992. He lives in Cornwall and works all over the country as a performer and writer in schools.

== Books ==
=== Poetry ===
- What the night says
- That Was Peter Glaze – Ure Press – 1993,
- The Professor’s Boots – Westwords – 1994,
- Jewels & Binoculars (Ed) – Stride 1994,
- Things We Said Today (Ed) Stride -1995,
- Variety’s Hammer – Stride – 1997,
- Starfly – Stride – 2004,
- Nowhere’s Far – New & Selected Poems 1990–2009 – Salt Publications,

=== As contributor ===
- Hepworth –Westwords – 1993,
- Return to Sender – Headlock – 1994,
- The Bridport Anthology – Sansom - 1995,
- The Forward Anthology – Forward – 1998,
- Paradise for Sale – Arts Council Collection – 1998,
- Welsh Routes – Liverpool Community Spirit – 2006,
- Hidden Histories – Exeter University – 2007,
- You Have Been Warned – Oxford - 2008,

=== Prose ===
- A Gallery to Play to – the story of the Mersey Poets – Stride – 1998, Updated and republished – Liverpool University Press - 2008.

=== Plays ===
- A Handful Of Rain: New York City, Edinburgh, Swansea, New End Theatre – 1999 - 2002,
- The Same Boat: Swansea, Cardiff and at the Edinburgh Fringe in 2003/4,
- The Other Side of the Words: Swansea Penzance in 2004 – St Ives 2006,
- Chimney Kids– (a musical for children with Paul Butler): Camborne, 2004, Swansea 2006,
- Anything But Love: New End London 2007, Swansea 2008, St Ives Festival 2009, Cheltenham Literature Festival 2010
- Parlez Vous Jig Jig: Swansea, 2004, 2006, Shakespeare Link, Powys, Rosemary Branch, London 2008.
- A Case of the Poet: London 2006, Hull 2007,

== Other publications ==
- Crafting Poetry – Original Writing for GCSE Readings by Phil Bowen – DMEC
- The Blue Hand DVD (DMEC)
- Adventures in Poetry – Radio 4 - Tonight at Noon – Adrian Henri 2004
- Centre of the Creative Universe – Liverpool & the Avant-Garde – Liverpool University Press and Tate Liverpool – 2007 . Revisiting Allen Ginsberg’s Liverpool trip in 1965….

== Radio, Television and Film ==
- Poetry Please
- Write Out Loud
- Something Understood
- The Archive Hour
- Adventures in Poetry - Radio 4
- Happy Birthday Poetry - Radio 2
- London Weekend TV
- Laughing Gas (Andrew Lanyon Films) - Mister Aquaviva Pilot for Theta Films 2007/08

== Awards ==
- The Ralph Lewis Award 1997 (Sussex University)
- The Bridport Prize 1998 Runner Up
