= 2005 British Academy Television Craft Awards =

Technical achievements in television awards ceremony

6th British Academy Television Craft Awards
- Date: 8 May 2005
- Site: The Dorchester, Mayfair, UK
- Hosted by: Jon Culshaw

The British Academy Television Craft Awards of 2005 are presented by the British Academy of Film and Television Arts (BAFTA) and were held on 8 May 2005 at The Dorchester, Mayfair, the ceremony was hosted by Jon Culshaw.

== Winners and nominees ==
Winners will be listed first and highlighted in boldface.

Best New Director - Fiction	Best New Director - Factual
**Daniel Percival – Dirty War**; Angus Jackson – Elmina's Kitchen; Paul King – The Mighty Boosh; Sarah Lancashire – The Afternoon Play: Viva Las Blackpool	**Patrick Collerton – The Boy Whose Skin Fell Off**; Julia Black – My Foetus; James Brabazon – This World: Holidays In The Danger Zone - Violent Coast; Krishnendu Majumdar – Who You Callin' A Nigger?
Anthony Asquith Award for New British Composer	Best Original Television Music
**Jane Antonia Cornish – Five Children and It**; David Gray – A Way of Life; Andrew Hewitt – Garth Marenghi's Darkplace; Paul Leonard – Fallen	**Sex Traffic – Jonathan Goldsmith**; Himalaya with Michael Palin – David Hartley, Andre Jacquemin, Dave Howman; Spooks – Jennie Muskett, Sheridan Tongue; Green Wing – Jonathan Whitehead
Best New Writer	Best Make-Up and Hair Design
**Brian Dooley – The Smoking Room**; Brian Hill – Bella and the Boys; Kwame Kwei-Armah – Elmina's Kitchen; Derren Litten, Catherine Tate – The Catherine Tate Show	**Sex Traffic – Caroline Noble**; Dead Ringers – Kate Benton, Diane Chenery-Wickens; Absolutely Fabulous (Christmas Special) – Christine Cant; Little Britain – Lisa Cavalli-Green
Best Costume Design	Best Production Design
**The Long Firm – James Keast**; Little Britain – Annie Hardinge; Strictly Come Dancing – Su Judd; Sex Traffic – Anushia Nieradzik	**Sex Traffic – Candida Otton**; North And South – Simon Elliott; Spooks – Stevie Herbert, Robert Foster; Blackpool – Grenville Horner
Best Photography and Lighting - Fiction	Best Photography - Factual
**Sex Traffic – Chris Seager**; The Long Firm – Sean Bobbit; Spooks – Simon Chaudoir; Dirty Filthy Love – David Odd	**Venice (for "Death") – Fred Fabre**; British Isles: A Natural History – Camera Team; Himalaya with Michael Palin – Nigel Meakin, Peter Meakin; Bears: Spy in the Woods – Michael W Richards, Geoffrey Bell
Best Editing - Fiction/Entertainment	Best Editing - Factual
**Sex Traffic – Mark Day**; Shameless – Fiona Colbeck; Dirty Filthy Love – Tania Reddin; The Long Firm – Paul Tothill	**The Boy Whose Skin Fell Off – Nick Fenton**; Dunkirk – Oliver Huddleston; Death in Gaza – Misha Manson-Smith; D-Day – Peter Parnham
Best Sound - Entertainment	Best Sound - Factual
**Sex Traffic – Simon Okin, Jane Tattersall, David McCallum, Lou Solakofski**; The Long Firm – Richard Manton, Catherine Hodgson, Graham Headicar, Paul Hamblin; Dirty Filthy Love – Reg Mills, Nick Cox, Phil Barnes, Nigel Edwards; Shameless – Sound Team	**The Genius of Mozart – Andy Rose, Tony Meering, Ben Baird**; Big Cat Week – Andy Hawley, Andy Milk, Andrew Wilson, Ian Bown; The Boy Whose Skin Fell Off – Bob Jackson; Himalaya with Michael Palin – John Pritchard, George Foulgham
Best Visual Effects	Best Graphic Design
**Battlefield Britain – Red Vision**; The Brighton Bomb – Steve Bowman, Mike Tucker; British Isles: A Natural History – David Corfield; Omagh – Team FX	**The Long Firm – Ray Leek**; British Isles: A Natural History – David Corfield; Spooks – Mark Doman; Athens Olympics 2004 (Title Sequence) – Paul Mitchell, Louise Braham, Katy Jones

=== Special awards ===
- **Michael Hurll**
- **Michael Palin**

== See also ==
- 2005 British Academy Television Awards
