= Tales from Pleasure Beach =

- Genre: Drama
- Written by: Roger Williams
- Directed by: Edmund Coulthard
- Starring: Joanna Griffiths; Rhian Grundy; Brian Hibbard; Lynn Hunter
- Composer: The Fratelli Brothers
- Country of origin: United Kingdom
- Original language: English
- No. of series: 1
- No. of episodes: 3

Production
- Executive producer: Maggie Russell
- Producer: Madonna Baptiste
- Production locations: Aberavon, Neath Port Talbot, Wales, United Kingdom
- Running time: 40 minutes
- Production company: Blast! Films

Original release
- Network: BBC Two
- Release: 2 August – 16 August 2001

Tales from Pleasure Beach is a British television drama series first broadcast on BBC Two between 2 and 16 August 2001. Written by Welsh playwright Roger Williams, the three episodes each feature a self-contained story against the backdrop of a seaside amusement park.

The series received a BAFTA Awards nomination for Best Drama Series, but was beaten to the award by Cold Feet.

Filmed at Coney Beach Amusement Park in Porthcawl, South Wales, and Aberavon, Port Talbot, the series included performances from Ruth Jones, Rachel Isaac, Eve Myles and Siwan Morris.

== Episodes ==
No.	Title	Original release date	Viewers (millions)
1	"Laid"	2 August 2001	2.45 million
Featuring Joanna Griffiths, Mark Letheren and Brian Hibbard.
2	"Lush"	9 August 2001	1.94 million
Featuring Eve Myles, Siwan Morris and Richard Lynch.
3	"Faithless"	16 August 2001	N/A
Featuring Mark Lewis Jones, Ruth Jones and Steffan Rhodri.

== Reception ==
Esther Addley, reviewing the second episode for The Guardian, said Tales from Pleasure Beach was "nicely shot, well acted and refreshingly frank in its portrayal of alcopop-swilling sexual manners", however she found it "rattling through a series of stock tableaux that juddered perceptively under the weight of their agony aunt morality".
