= Rob Dawber =

British writer (1956-2001)

Robert "Rob" Dawber
- Born: 8 January 1956; Wath-upon-Dearne, West Riding of Yorkshire, England
- Died: 20 February 2001 (aged 45)
- Occupations: Screenwriter, railwayman
- Writing career
- Notable work: The Navigators (2001)

Robert "Rob" Dawber (8 January 1956 – 20 February 2001) was a British railwayman turned writer whose script for the film The Navigators was commissioned by director Ken Loach and shot in Sheffield, where Dawber lived. He was a long-standing member of the Trotskyist group the Alliance for Workers' Liberty.

== Biography ==
=== Background ===
Dawber grew up in Wath-upon-Dearne, then in the West Riding of Yorkshire (attending Wath Grammar School) and, having studied Politics and English at Leicester University, decided to pursue a career on the railways.

He had strong political beliefs, and during his time as a railwayman he "became a branch secretary for the National Union of Railwaymen, and wrote for Socialist Organiser and Off The Rails, a bulletin for rail workers. His Fat Controller column mercilessly lampooned the rail managers who squandered the opportunities of the nationalised industries".

Following privatisation of the railways from 1994, Dawber was made redundant and he took the decision to begin writing a film script. After sending his work to Ken Loach, his script about the breakup of the nationalised railways through privatisation was commissioned.

=== Illness and death ===
One week after this news, Rob discovered he was suffering from mesothelioma, a rare form of lung cancer caused by handling asbestos during the course of his work on the railway.

Rob searched the world for therapies and treatments, but died on 20 February 2001 at the age of 45. He saw The Navigators completed but did not live to see its release.

Ken Loach, in his Guardian obituary of Rob Dawber, wrote that "Working people have lost a champion".
