= Elmina's Kitchen =

2003 play by Kwame Kwei-Armah

- Written by: Kwame Kwei-Armah
- Characters: Anastasia, Clifton, Ashley, Baygee, Deli, Digger
- Original language: English
- Subject: Crime
- Genre: Drama
- Setting: Hackney, London

Premiere
- Date premiered: May 2003
- Place premiered: National Theatre, London

Elmina's Kitchen, first performed in May 2003, is the fifth play from the British actor, playwright and broadcaster, Kwame Kwei-Armah. Set in a West Indian restaurant in London, Elmina's Kitchen tells a tale of family, drugs and crime on Hackney's Murder Mile. The play is centred on the character of Deli, the owner of a West Indian restaurant and father to Ashley. Ashley is a misguided teen who cannot help but be seduced by the gangster culture that surrounds him. Deli tries to run a successful restaurant while attempting to keep his son on the straight and narrow particularly when his son gets closer to a well-known local gangster, Digger.

== Major productions ==
=== On stage productions ===
Elmina's Kitchen premiered in May 2003 at the National Theatre, London, where it ran until 25 August 2003. During its stint at the National Theatre, the play was directed by Angus Jackson and starred Doña Croll, Oscar James, Shaun Parkes and Don Warrington, all of whom starred in the premiere production. It also featured Michael Obiora and writer Kwame Kwei-Armah as Deli.

=== Television productions ===
In June 2005, Elmina's Kitchen was televised on the UK's BBC. The show took place in authentic settings separating itself from the stage performance. The televised drama featured the cast that initially performed the play at the National Theatre.

== Awards ==
For the National Theatre production Kwame Kwei-Armah won The Evening Standard Award for the Most Promising New Playwright of 2003. Kwei-Armah was also shortlisted in the Best New Play category at the 2004 Laurence Olivier Awards.
