= The Navigators (film) =

2001 British film by Ken Loach

- French DVD cover
- Directed by: Ken Loach
- Written by: Rob Dawber
- Produced by: Rebecca O'Brien
- Starring: Dean Andrews; Thomas Craig; Joe Duttine; Steve Huison; Venn Tracey
- Cinematography: Barry Ackroyd
- Edited by: Jonathan Morris
- Music by: George Fenton
- Release dates: 16 November 2001 (UK); 21 February 2003 (U.S.)
- Running time: 96 minutes
- Countries: United Kingdom; Germany; Spain
- Language: English

The Navigators is a 2001 British film directed by Ken Loach with screenplay by Rob Dawber.

It tells the story of the reactions of five Sheffield rail workers to the privatisation of the railway maintenance organisation for which they all work, and the consequences for them. The film was inspired by the failure of the Connex South Central and the Connex South Eastern franchises: Connex was ultimately stripped of both franchises before the franchise period ended due to poor service and financial mismanagement.

Rob Dawber received the 2001 BAFTA award (posthumously) for "New Writer" for the film.

== Plot ==
The film follows five railway workers – John, Paul, Mick, Gerry and Len – in a Yorkshire depot affected by the privatisation of British Rail in 1995. The men are informed by their supervisor that they are now working for a company called East Midlands Infrastructure, and are competing with rival maintenance companies.

On a maintenance job, one of the workers is sent away because his depot is now owned by a rival firm. His departure leaves the rest of the crew unable to finish the job. The railwaymen are introduced to their new managing director, Mr Hemmings, by watching a video about the "age of change" in Britain's rail industry. Hemmings says that the culture will change too, and the days of a job for life are over, though new opportunities have arisen for those prepared to take the initiative. East Midlands Infrastructure is renamed Gilchrist Engineering.

Gerry argues with his boss about procedures being imposed without consultation. Management make a concession that the crew points out is no concession at all. The managing director visits the depot in person, and demands that, since "the slate has been wiped clean", there must be no concessions or agreements, forcing the supposed concession to be withdrawn.

To the railwaymen's surprise, they are ordered to destroy their old equipment with sledgehammers as it no longer meets current standards. They are interrupted with news of a derailment at Dore. There they meet a former colleague, Len, who is working for an agency and earning much more than he did with the company.

After his pay is reduced to pay for additional child support, Paul agrees to take voluntary redundancy and join an agency. John follows suit. Mick and Gerry try to talk them out of it, pointing out that they will lose any job security. However, the few remaining Gilchrist employees are soon notified that the depot is no longer competitive and will be closed. They are given twelve weeks' notice of their redundancy.

Mick visits an employment agency and discovers that, while work is available, he will receive no sickness benefits and must pay for his own transport, equipment and training. He goes to a job but the crew he joins is four men short and includes builders with no railway experience. Mick argues with the supervisor, and is given a negative report which leaves him unemployed for weeks. He finally manages to get another assignment that leads to a reunion with his former colleagues. Their happiness at working together again is marred by a passing train spewing toilet waste over them.

The men are given a job pouring a cement signal base, but they are next to an active track with no look out. After dusk, Jim is hit by a locomotive and badly injured. Since they could be barred from working for breaching safety procedures, Mick and Paul carry Jim to the side of a road so that they can claim he has been hit by a car.

Jim dies from his injuries. Gerry is now the only one of the original five remaining at Gilchrist, and his job is due to end in days.

== Cast ==
- Dean Andrews as John
- Thomas Craig as Mick
- Joe Duttine as Paul
- Steve Huison as Jim
- Venn Tracey as Gerry
- Andy Swallow as Len
- Sean Glenn as Harpic
- Charlie Brown as Jack
- Juliet Bates as Fiona
- John Aston as Bill Walters
- Graham Heptinstall as Owen
- Angela Saville as Tracy
- Clare McSwain as Lisa
- Megan Topham as Chloe
- Abigail Pearson as Eve

== See also ==
- Impact of the privatisation of British Rail
