= Gas Attack =

2001 film by Kenny Glenaan

Gas Attack is a 2001 drama film produced by Samantha Kingsley and directed by Kenny Glenaan. The film portrays a fictional scenario in which Kurdish asylum seekers become the target of a biological attack in a Glasgow suburb. The film details the results on the community affected, the council team supporting them, the local authorities and emergency services involved in the crisis, the greater public impact and the medical staff that struggle to cope with the influx of victims.

The film attracted much controversy, with Glasgow Council considering a ban on the broadcasting of the film, but won three awards for its screenplay, including the British Independent Film Awards.

== Plot ==
On a pig farm in Scotland, a recording is made of the livestock present at the farm, of which a large number are dead or dying from an unknown illness.

Nationwide, Britain is experiencing an intense period of racial tension, with extremist groups clashing with police forces across the country and rioting taking place in major cities, the most severe being in Glasgow. Some Scottish politicians attribute the deteriorating relations to a recent influx of Kurdish asylum seekers in Glasgow, supported by local authorities and handled by the Asylum Seeker Resettlement Project, which they claim is unwanted by the British public and has resulted in a backlash by disaffected citizens.

One such asylum seeker, Sherko Hussein struggles to make a living with his illegally underpaid job, having moved from Iran with his daughter Resa to northern Glasgow. While in a shopping centre with Resa, he notices that Resa has developed a bad cough and is unwell. ASRP worker Robina Dhoody becomes concerned about Resa's health, and convinces Sherko to take her to Broomyhill Infirmary.

Doctor Annie Millbrook diagnoses Resa with acute influenza and prescribes antibiotics to her and admits Resa to the ward. Robina notices that the hospital is inundated with large numbers of other asylum seekers from the same block of flats that the Husseins live in, all presenting with similar flu-like symptoms. However, she is met with a cool response when she encourages Sherko to complain to the authorities, who is fearful he will be discriminated against because of his migrant status and deported.

Meanwhile, a neighbour of the Husseins, Hamaz Mohammed, suddenly deteriorates and dies from his illness. This concerns the Kurdish community, who worry a similar fate awaits their affected members, and confuses the medical staff treating the asylum seekers, who order a postmortem and hold a meeting with the families of the asylum seekers to reassure them. Robina becomes suspicious about the circumstances of Hamaz's death and becomes convinced that the conditions in which the asylum seekers live is attributable to Hamaz's death. However, she is warned by her superior Bill Grigson (Laurie Ventry) to fall in with the official angle and that investigating her "wildcat" theories will be both fruitless and unhelpful to the situation. Despite this, she becomes determined to act when at the public meeting, Millbrook and other officials accidentally reveal that Hamaz died of an unknown infection and that it could be a serious viral pathogen such as TB, exacerbated by Robina mentioning TB which is picked up by the interpreter and disseminated to the community.

Robina is convinced that the asylum seekers contracted TB by way of infectious animal ash being blown from an incinerator north of the high-rise flats the Kurdish live in. She attempts to break into the compound discreetly, but is caught by the security firm guarding the facility and removed. Grigson asks her to focus on her job of integrating asylum seekers and to allow the medical staff to treat the contagion without her interference, warning that the council will not tolerate repeated maverick actions. However, Robina ignores this and immediately returns to Broomyhill to interrogate Millbrook.

Overnight, police and racial groups and protesters clash in heavy riots across the UK, particularly in the Glasgow area, and emergency services struggle to maintain order as the social unrest escalates.

At Broomyhill, patients begin to make decisive recoveries and Millbrook begins to discharge the asylum seekers. However, she remains concerned at the unusual pathology and the death of Hamaz. While waiting for the postmortem results, she investigates possible causes of the illness experienced by the Kurdish. She eventually reaches an alarming conclusion; it is possible that Hamaz has been killed by anthrax bacteria. This is confirmed by the postmortem of Hamaz.

An emergency outbreak control team is assembled consisting of personnel from all of the relevant departments; however, the NHS chief executive is adamant that the mounting threat of an anthrax attack be censored from the press, worrying at the public panic and the resulting collapse of the already overstretched infrastructure, and the team are ineffectual in responding to the threat of the illness, treating the potential outbreak as an isolated case and investigating nearby agricultural facilities for sources of anthrax outbreaks, believing that Hamaz may have contracted the virus from moonlighting cheap farm labour. However, this is leaked to the media, which begins to make a connection between the Kurdish epidemic and the illness.
