= Kwame Kwei-Armah =

Actor and playwright

Kwame Kwei-Armah OBE
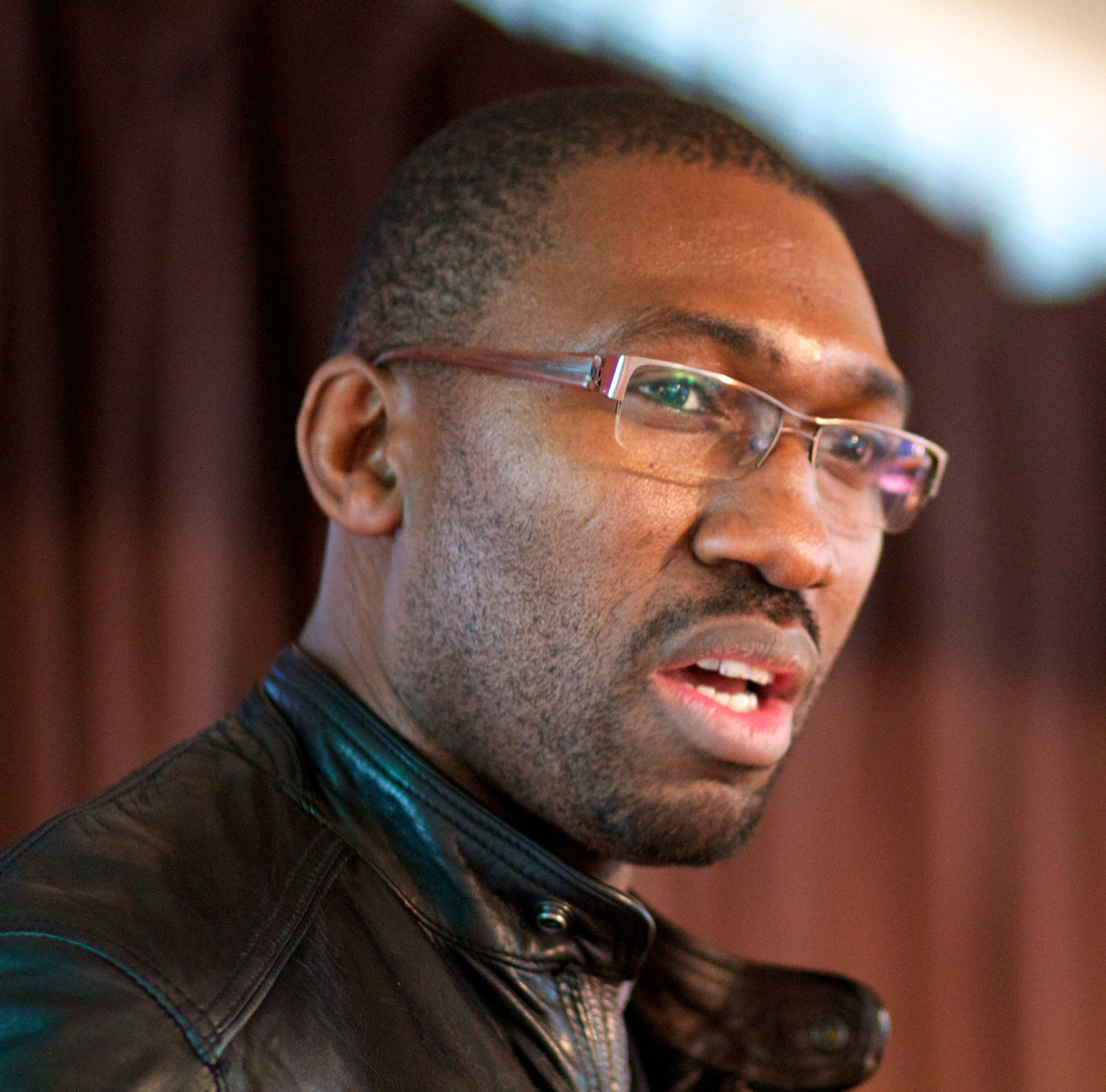
- Kwei-Armah in 2011
- Born: Ian Roberts; 24 March 1967 (age 59); Hillingdon, London, England
- Education: Barbara Speake Stage School
- Known for: Actor, playwright, singer, and broadcaster
- Children: 4

Kwame Kwei-Armah OBE (born Ian Roberts; 24 March 1967 in Hillingdon, London) is a British actor, playwright, director and broadcaster. In 2005, Kwei-Armah became the second black Briton to have a play staged in London's West End (Note: In 1990, Ray Harrison Graham's Fringe First award-winning play Gary played at the Arts Theatre.) when his award-winning piece Elmina's Kitchen transferred to the Garrick Theatre. He was the first black Briton to head a major British national theater, when he took the directorship of the Young Vic in 2018. Kwei-Armah was appointed Officer of the Order of the British Empire (OBE) in the 2012 Birthday Honours for services to drama.

Brought up in Southall, West London, he changed his name at the age of 19, after tracing his family history, through the slave trade back to his ancestral African roots in Ghana. His parents were born in Grenada. He has four children.

As an actor, Kwei-Armah is probably best known for playing paramedic Finlay Newton in the BBC medical drama Casualty from 1999 until 2004. He served as the chancellor of the University of the Arts London from 2011 to 2015. and was the artistic director of Baltimore's Center Stage Theater in the United States from 2011 to 2018. From 2018, he was artistic director of the Young Vic theatre in London, announcing his departure in February 2024.

== Early life ==
Kwei-Armah was born at Hillingdon Hospital in West London, and named Ian Roberts. He changed his name when he was aged 19 after tracing his family history (in which he first became interested as a child after watching the TV series Roots), through the slave trade back to his ancestral African roots in Ghana, descendant of Coromantins. His parents were born in Grenada, then a British colony. His maternal grandmother moved to Trinidad, where she died, leaving her five children including Kwei-Armah's mother as orphans in Grenada. Kwei-Armah's mother moved to Britain in 1962. His father, Eric, moved to Britain in 1960, at a time when there was high unemployment in Grenada, and found work in London at the local Quaker Oats factory.

When he was one year old, Kwei-Armah's family moved to a two-storey terraced house in Southall where they let two rooms to help to pay for the mortgage. Kwei-Armah started at his first primary school as a five-year-old, and after a teacher disciplined him by kicking him in the back, his mother took on three jobs to pay for him and his two siblings to go to a private stage school, the Barbara Speake Stage School in London – working as a child minder, as a night nurse at Hillingdon Hospital, and doing some hairdressing work. He also attended The Salvation Army, and received musical training there. At the age of about 35, his mother had a stroke leading to left-sided weakness, from which she slowly recovered.

Kwei-Armah grew up in West London's Southall in the 1970s at a time when Asian families were moving in and white families were moving out, and he perceived animosity from the Asian community towards the Afro-Caribbean community. One day, at the time of Friday 3 July 1981Southall riots, his father came home after the evening work-shift and took him out to see the Hambrough Tavern on fire. Kwei-Armah saw a police van arrive, and when the police started to charge at the crowd using batons and shields he ran home frightened. He claims to have seen from the upstairs front room the police chasing black and Asian boys along the street followed by skinheads, who also had batons and shields, chasing behind the police. The event shocked him making him feel that he was living in an alien environment, and reinforced his resolve to do well in his education. He later wrote about the event in his first play, A Bitter Herb.

== Appearances on stage, television and radio ==
As Ian Roberts, Kwei-Armah portrayed Duke, who was one of The Latchkey Children in the eponymous London Weekend Television series that was written by Eric Allen and aired in 1980.

Kwei-Armah appeared in the original London production of Elegies for Angels, Punks and Raging Queens, which played at the Criterion Theatre in 1993.

Kwei-Armah first achieved fame playing the paramedic Finlay Newton in the BBC drama series Casualty from 1999 to 2004. His other television credits include appearances in episodes of Casualty′s sister series Holby City, the BBC's Afternoon Play, Between the Lines and The Bill. In 2003 he appeared as a contestant on the Reality TV programme Comic Relief does Fame Academy and subsequently released an album, Kwame. In 2007, he starred as E. R. Braithwaite in the two-part BBC Radio 4 adaptation of Braithwaite's novel To Sir, with Love.

Kwei-Armah was seen in the episode "Who Shot the Sheriff?" in the 2006 BBC One revival of Robin Hood, as an ambitious town planner in Lewis, and in the feature film Fade to Black opposite Danny Huston, Christopher Walken and Diego Luna. He is also a regular on TheatreVoice.

He presented the 15 February 2009 episode of the Channel 4 documentary Christianity: A History, during which he spoke about his own Christian faith and African identity, in addition to the African origins of Christianity in Ethiopia.

In the summer of 2009, he presented the Channel 4 series On Tour with the Queen, which looked at the impact of Queen Elizabeth II's tour of the Commonwealth that took place between November 1953 and May 1954. He also met with King George Tupou V of Tonga, Sitiveni Rabuka and Queen Elizabeth II herself on the trip. In March 2010, Kwei-Armah appeared in the penultimate and final episodes of the fourth series of Skins.

For a number of years Kwei-Armah has appeared as a panellist on the arts discussion show Newsnight Review. He also appeared on Question Time on two occasions and reported for The Culture Show.

On 15 May 2011 he was the stranded person on BBC Radio 4's Desert Island Discs. His musical selections included the political power-rap of Chuck D and his band Public Enemy, Marvin Gaye, Bob Marley and Lord Kitchener. Kwei-Armah said living with his parents was like existing with two very different types of theatre in the family home: he would be serving rum to his father and his pals, while his mother was hosting church meetings in the living-room.

In 2011 Kwei-Armah chose Marcus Garvey as his subject for the BBC Radio 4 series Great Lives.

== Career as a playwright ==
Kwei-Armah's first play, Bitter Herb (1998), won him a Peggy Ramsay award, and was subsequently put on by the Bristol Old Vic, where he also became writer-in-residence. His Blues Brother, Soul Sister was produced at the Theatre Royal, Bristol, in 1999, and Big Nose was performed in 1999 at the Belgrade Theatre, Coventry.

Kwei-Armah's fifth play, Elmina's Kitchen, premiered in May 2003 at the National Theatre, and was shortlisted in the Best New Play category at the 2004 Laurence Olivier Awards. That same year, Kwei-Armah received the Evening Standard Award for the Most Promising New Playwright of 2003. In 2005, he was nominated for a BAFTA award for the television version of Elmina's Kitchen.

Walter's War, a drama written by Kwei-Armah and based on the wartime experiences of footballer Walter Tull's life, was made by UK TV channel BBC Four and screened on 9 November 2008 as part of the BBC's "Ninety Years of Remembrance" season in November 2008. Kwei-Armah also had a cameo role in the film.

Kwei-Armah is a member of the board of the National Theatre and was awarded an honorary doctorate by the Open University in 2008, and in 2009 was a judge for the BBC World Service's International Radio Playwriting Competition. On 28 February 2011, he was named as the new artistic director at Baltimore's Center Stage theatre, replacing Irene Lewis, who had served in the position for 19 years. Kwei-Armah's play Elmina's Kitchen had been staged in 2005, followed by Let There Be Love in 2010, and in 2007 he directed Naomi Wallace's Things of Dry Hours.

Kwei-Armah was involved in the Bush Theatre's 2011 project Sixty-Six Books, for which he wrote a piece based on a chapter of the King James Bible.

He was elected a Fellow of the Royal Society of Literature in 2014.

He is also a patron of the Shakespeare Schools Festival, a charity that enables school children across the UK to perform Shakespeare in professional theatres.

Kwei-Armah wrote and directed the world premiere of Marley, a musical based on the life and music of Bob Marley which ran at Center Stage, Baltimore in May and June 2015. In March and April 2017 the musical made its UK premiere in a new production (rewritten by Kwei Armah) at the Birmingham Repertory Theatre under a new title One Love: The Bob Marley Musical.

In October 2016 Kwei-Armah directed the European premiere of One Night in Miami by the award-winning, black, US playwright Kemp Powers. One Night in Miami ran from 6 October to 3 December 2016 at the Donmar Warehouse in London's West End. The all-black cast portrays the friendship between four of the most celebrated black icons in American history at a pivotal moment in their lives: 22-year-old boxing champion Cassius Clay, on the brink of becoming Muhammad Ali, celebrates his world heavyweight championship title with controversial civil rights activist Malcolm X, along with singer songwriter Sam Cooke and NFL champion footballer Jim Brown. The action takes place in a Miami hotel room, watched over by Nation of Islam security.

Kwei-Armah collaborated with Idris Elba on the musical Tree, which premiered at the Manchester International Festival in 2019.

Kwei-Armah was a credited lyricist on the ArrDee and Cat Burns single "Home for My Heart", which was released on 9 March 2023. The single debuted at number 35 on the UK Singles Chart.

In 2026, Kwei-Armah's musical CrazySexyCool, about the girl group TLC, opened at the Arena Stage in Washington, D.C.

=== Controversy surrounding Tree ===
On 2 July 2019, The Guardian published a story describing how Tori Allen-Martin and Sarah Henley claimed they had been removed from the production of Tree. In 2015, Elba had asked them to develop and workshop his idea for a musical based on his album Idris Elba Presents mi Mandela, on which Allen-Martin had also collaborated. Allen-Martin and Henley said they had worked on the project for four years. In 2018, the show was commissioned by Manchester International Festival for their 2019 festival and Kwei-Armah was asked to join the project by Elba and Manchester International Festival as writer and director of the show. Tree was later billed as "created by Idris Elba and Kwame Kwei-Armah".

Allen-Martin and Henley claim that their creative input had included research, script-writing as well as the play's title, and that they were threatened with legal action if they went public with the story. The co-producers of Tree released a statement refuting their claims. Kwei-Armah and Elba both published personal responses to Allen-Martin and Henley's claims on Twitter. Elba said it was his "contractual right as beholder of the original idea, the album" to take the show in a different creative direction. The producers state that the two versions of Tree are "different projects....Any similarities between the 2019 production of Tree, and Tori and Sarah’s 2016 workshopped script can be attributed to the fact that both were based upon the same original concept created by Idris Elba."

== Personal life ==
Kwei-Armah has three children from his first marriage to Fyna Dowe and one from his second. His son Kwame Jr, professionally known as KZ, contributed production and vocals to Wretch 32 and Avelino's 2015 mixtape Young Fire, Old Flame, and Wretch 32's third studio album, Growing Over Life, released in September 2016.

== Work ==
=== Theatre (incomplete) ===
Year	Title	Role	Details	Notes
1985	Class K	Josh	Royal Exchange, Manchester	Directed by Braham Murray. Written by Trevor Peacock.
1986	Carmen Jones	Actor	Crucible Theatre, Sheffield	Directed by Steven Pimlott. Written by Oscar Hammerstein II.
1986	Mozart and Salieri	Salieri	Crucible Theatre, Sheffield	Directed by Stephen Daldry.
1986	Amadeus	Venticello	Crucible Theatre, Sheffield	Credited as Ian Roberts. Directed by Clare Venables.
1986	The Gods Are Not To Blame	Chief Balogun	Talawa Theatre Company / Riverside Studios	Directed by Yvonne Brewster. Written by Ola Rotimi.
1988	Cricket at Camp David	Calvin	Octagon Theatre, Bolton	Directed by Romy Baskerville. Written by Jenny McLeod.
1989	Choo Choo Ch' Boogie	Reverend Murchison / Big Richard	Octagon Theatre, Bolton	Directed by Andy Hay. Written by Tyrone Huggins.
199?	Blues in the Night	Man in Saloon	Salisbury Playhouse	Directed by Chris Monks
1991	Carmen Jones	Dink	The Old Vic, London	Credited as Ian Roberts. Directed by Simon Callow. Written by Oscar Hammerstein II.
1991	Streetwise	Angel	Temba Theatre Company	Directed by Alby James. Written by Benjamin Zephaniah.
1991	Mamma Decemba	John	Temba Theatre Company	Directed by Alby James. Written by Nigel Moffatt.
1993	Maid Marian and Her Merry Men: The Musical	Barrington	Bristol Old Vic	Stage adaptation of the children's television series of the same name. Directed by Andy Hay and Tony Robbins. Written by Tony Robinson, Mark Billingham and David Lloyd.
1995	Elegies for Angels, Punks and Raging Queens	Various	Criterion Theatre, London	Written and directed by Bill Russell.
1999	Big Nose	Clovis Dibiset	Belgrade Theatre, Coventry	Adaptation of Edmond Rostand's Cyrano de Bergerac. Co-written by Kwame Kwei-Armah and Chris Monks.
1999	Hold On		Bristol Old Vic	Written by Kwame Kwei-Armah. Later staged as Blues Brother Soul Sister.
2001	Blues Brother Soul Sister		Bristol Old Vic	Written by Kwame Kwei-Armah. Previously named Hold On.
2003	Elmina's Kitchen		Cottesloe Theatre, National Theatre. Transferred to the Garrick Theatre in the West End.	Written by Kwame Kwei-Armah. The play was later broadcast on BBC Radio 3 in 2004.
2004	Fix Up		Cottesloe Theatre, National Theatre	Written by Kwame Kwei-Armah.
2007	Things of Dry Hours		Center Stage, Baltimore	Kwame Kwei-Armah's directorial debut. Written by Naomi Wallace.
2007	Statement of Regret		Cottesloe Theatre, National Theatre	Written by Kwame Kwei-Armah. This play was broadcast as The Saturday Play on BBC Radio 4, on 18 July 2009, with Don Warrington and Colin McFarlane reprising the principal roles of Kwaku and Michael.
2008	Let There Be Love		The Tricycle Theatre	Written and directed by Kwame Kwei-Armah.
2009	Seize the Day		The Tricycle Theatre	Written and directed by Kwame Kwei-Armah.
2011	When We Praise		Bush Theatre, London	Written by Kwame Kwei-Armah. Part of Sixty-Six Books, a cycle of sixty-six short plays by various playwrights based on the books of the protestant bible, with Kwei-Armah's play based on the Book of Psalms.
2013	The Mountaintop		Center Stage, Baltimore	Directed by Kwame Kwei-Armah. Written by Katori Hall.
2013	Dance of the Holy Ghosts: A Play on Memory		Center Stage, Baltimore	Directed by Kwame Kwei-Armah. Written by Marcus Gardley.
2013	Detroit '67		The Public Theater, New York	Directed by Kwame Kwei-Armah. Written by Dominique Morisseau.
2013	The Liquid Plane		Signature Theater, New York / Oregon Shakespeare Festival	Directed by Kwame Kwei-Armah. Written by Naomi Wallace.
2013	Much Ado About Nothing		The Public Theater, New York	Directed by Kwame Kwei-Armah. Written by William Shakespeare.
2014	Amadeus		Center Stage, Baltimore	Directed by Kwame Kwei-Armah. Written by Peter Shaffer.
2015	One Night in Miami		Center Stage, Baltimore	Directed by Kwame Kwei-Armah. Written by Kemp Powers.
2015	Marley		Center Stage, Baltimore	Written and directed by Kwame Kwei-Armah. Later staged under the title One Love: The Bob Marley Musical.
2015	The Comedy of Errors		The Public Theater, New York	Directed by Kwame Kwei-Armah. Written by William Shakespeare.
2016	Porgy and Bess		Baltimore Symphony Orchestra	Directed by Kwame Kwei-Armah. Opera by George Gershwin.
2016	Twelfth Night		The Public Theater / Delacorte Theater, Central Park	Musical adaptation of William Shakespeare's Twelfth Night. Conceived by Kwame Kwei-Armah & Shaina Taub. Directed by Kwame Kwei-Armah.
2016	One Night in Miami		Donmar Warehouse, London	Directed by Kwame Kwei-Armah. Written by Kemp Powers.
2017	One Love: The Bob Marley Musical		Birmingham Repertory Theatre, Birmingham	Written and directed by Kwame Kwei-Armah. Previously staged under the title Marley.
2018	Twelfth Night		Young Vic, London	Musical adaptation of William Shakespeare's Twelfth Night. Conceived by Kwame Kwei-Armah & Shaina Taub. Directed by Kwame Kwei-Armah & Oskar Eustis.
2019	Tree		Manchester International Festival. Transferred to the Young Vic, London.	Created by Idris Elba & Kwame Kwei-Armah. Based on the album Idris Elba Presents, mi Mandela, with original development by Tori Allen-Martin & Sarah Henley. Written and directed by Kwame Kwei-Armah.
2021	The Visitor		The Public Theater, New York City	Musical based on the 2007 film of the same name. Book Kwame Kwei-Armah and Brian Yorkey.
2022	The Collaboration		Young Vic, London	Directed by Kwame Kwei-Armah. Written by Anthony McCarten.
2023	Beneatha's Place		Young Vic, London	Written and directed by Kwame Kwei-Armah. Part of The Raisin Cycle.
2023	Hercules		Paper Mill Playhouse, Millburn	Musical based on the 1997 Disney animated movie of the same name. Book co-written by Kwame Kwei-Armah and Robert Horn.
2026	CrazySexyCool		Arena Stage, Washington, D.C.	Written by Kwame Kwei-Armah. Musical about the girl group TLC.

=== Television (incomplete) ===
- Casualty (1999–2004)
- Walter's War (2008)
- Robin Hood (2006)

=== Film ===
Year	Title	Role	Notes
1995	Cutthroat Island	Dawg's Pirate	
1998	Gunslinger's Revenge (original title Il mio West)	Rastafarian	Named in credits as Kwame Kwei Armah
2000	The 3 Kings	Caspar	
2006	Fade to Black	Joe Black	
2021	Breaking (original title 892)	N/A	Co-writer and executive producer
TBA	The Collaboration	N/A	Feature directorial debut
