= Brian Hill (director) =

British film and TV director

Brian Hill is a British director of television programs and films. He is managing director of Century Films, a London-based independent film and television company.

Hill won the British Academy of Film and Television Arts award for New Director Fiction for the film Falling Apart in 2002. He was nominated for the Best New Writer award for the film Bella & the Boys in 2005.

In 2021 he worked with Poet Laureate Simon Armitage to create Where Did the World Go?, a "pandemic poem" broadcast on BBC Two in June 2021.
