= Wives and Daughters =

1864–1866 novel by Elizabeth Gaskell

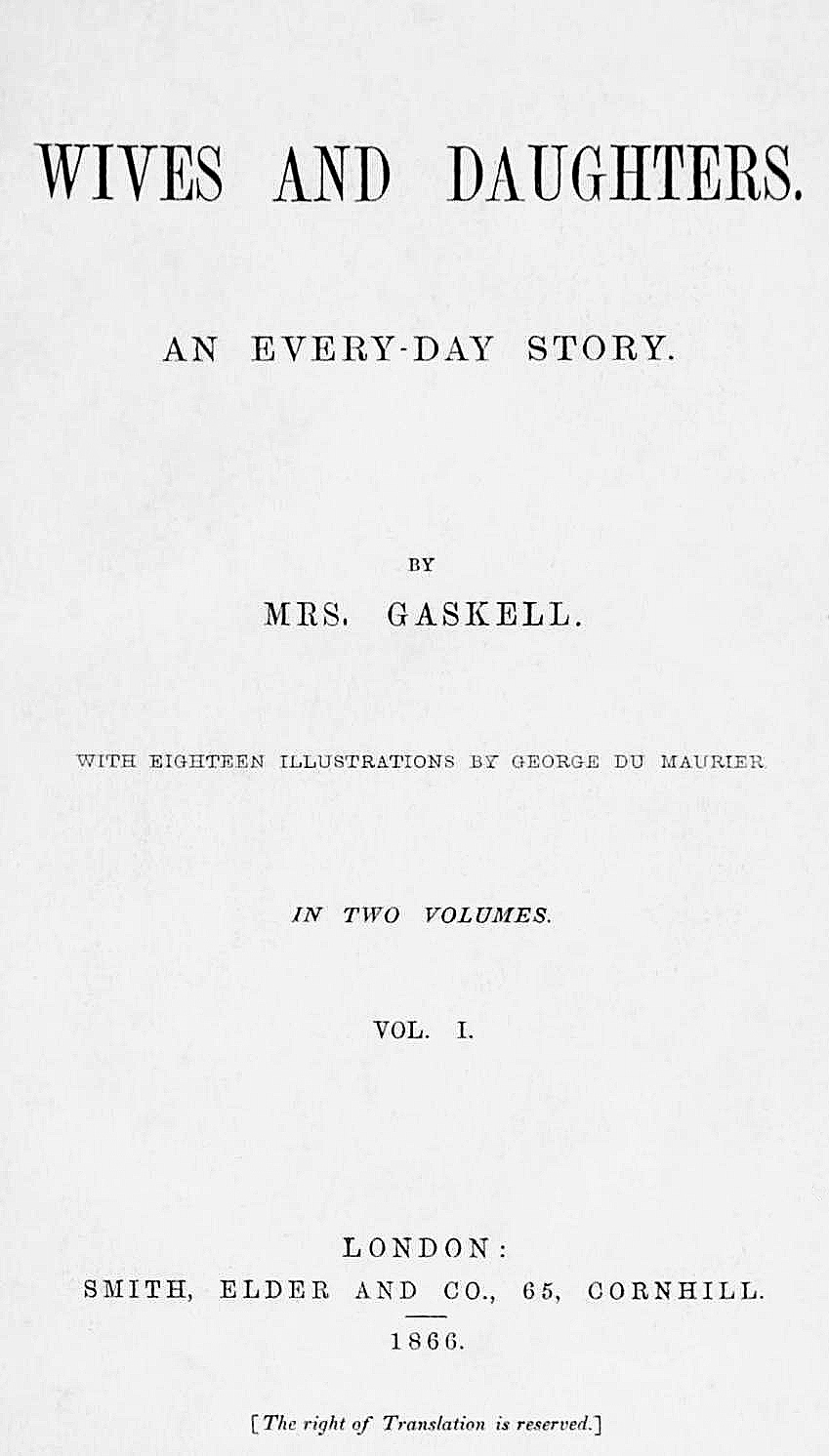
- Title page of the first edition, 1864–1866
- Author: Elizabeth Gaskell
- Language: English
- Genre: Romance novel
- Published: Serialized: August 1864 to January 1866; book 1866
- Publisher: Cornhill Magazine (serial); Smith, Elder and Company, book
- Publication place: United Kingdom
- Media type: Print
- Preceded by: Sylvia's Lovers

Wives and Daughters, An Every-Day Story is a novel by English author Elizabeth Gaskell, first published in the Cornhill Magazine as a serial from August 1864 to January 1866. It was partly written whilst Gaskell was staying with the salon hostess Mary Elizabeth Mohl at her home on the Rue du Bac in Paris. When Mrs Gaskell died suddenly in 1865, it was not quite complete, and the last section was written by Frederick Greenwood.

The story is about Molly Gibson, the only daughter of a widowed doctor living in a provincial English town in the 1830s.

== Plot summary ==
The novel opens with Molly Gibson as a young child, being raised by her widowed father, Mr. Gibson, the local doctor. During a visit to the local aristocratic 'great house' of Lord and Lady Cumnor, Molly loses her way on the grounds of the estate and falls asleep under a tree. Lady Cuxhaven (one of the daughters of the house) and Mrs. Kirkpatrick (a former governess to the Cumnor children) find Molly and put her to bed in Mrs. Kirkpatrick's room. The Cumnor family refer to Mrs Kirkpatrick as “Clare”, the name by which she had been known when a governess. Clare appears to be a kind woman and assures Molly that she will wake her up when it is time for the entourage to leave. She forgets to do so, and Molly is stranded in the mansion. She is distressed at the thought of having to spend the night there. To her relief, her father soon arrives to collect her.

Seven years later, Molly has grown into an attractive, good-hearted and straightforward young woman. Mr Gibson discovers that one of his apprentices, Mr. Coxe, has become romantically interested in Molly, unbeknownst to her. To protect Molly, her father sends her to stay with the nearby Hamleys of Hamley Hall, members of the landed gentry whose ancestors’ presence there is said to date back to the Heptarchy, but whose circumstances are now reduced. Molly forms a close attachment with Mrs. Hamley, who embraces her almost as a daughter. Molly is also befriended by the younger of the Hamley sons, Roger. Molly is aware that, as the daughter of a professional man, she would not be considered a suitable match for the sons of Squire Hamley. The elder son, Osborne, has been expected to distinguish himself at Cambridge and make a brilliant marriage: he is handsome, clever and more fashionable than his brother. He performs poorly at university, breaking the hearts of his parents.

During Molly's absence from the house, Mr. Gibson decides to marry again. He hopes that marriage will improve his domestic comfort and provide Molly with a mother figure to shield her from influences such as that of Mr. Coxe. He finds Mrs. Kirkpatrick ideally suited to his requirements and recalls her apparent kindness to Molly many years ago. Molly remembers her from their previous encounter but has little love for her. For her father's sake, she does her best to get on with her socially ambitious and self-absorbed new stepmother. The home is not always happy, but Molly does find an ally in her new stepsister, Cynthia, who is of a similar age. The two girls are a study in contrasts: Cynthia is far more worldly and rebellious than Molly, who is naive and slightly awkward. Cynthia has been educated in France and it gradually becomes apparent that she and her mother have secrets about their past involving the Cumnors' land agent, Mr. Preston, who is rumoured to be a gambler and a scoundrel.

As Molly continues to frequent Hamley Hall, she accidentally discovers a great secret: Osborne Hamley has married for love, to a French, Roman Catholic, ex-nursery maid, Aimée, whom he has established in a secret cottage because he is convinced that his father would never accept Aimée as his daughter-in-law. To compound his problems, Osborne's failure at Cambridge appears to make his invalid mother's illness worse. This widens the divide between him and his father, which is amplified by the considerable debts Osborne has run up to maintain his secret wife. Mrs Hamley dies, and the breach between the squire and his eldest son seems irreparable. Despite this, Roger continues to work hard at university and ultimately gains the honours and rewards that his brother had been expected to attain.

Mrs. Gibson tries to arrange a marriage between Cynthia and Osborne, as her aspirations include having her daughter married to a member of the landed gentry. Molly has always valued Roger's good sense and honourable character and soon falls in love with him. Unfortunately for her, Roger falls in love with Cynthia and when Mrs. Gibson overhears that Osborne may be fatally ill, improving Roger's chances of becoming heir to the Hamley estate, she begins promoting the match. Just before Roger leaves on a two-year scientific expedition to Africa, he asks for Cynthia's hand and she accepts, although she insists that their engagement should remain secret until Roger returns. Molly is heartbroken, and struggles with her sorrow and her knowledge that Cynthia lacks affection for Roger.

Cynthia reveals to Molly that, several years earlier, when she was just fifteen, she had secretly promised to marry Mr Preston after he had loaned her £20. Although she soon regretted this decision, Mr Preston is still obsessed with her, and threatens to show Roger love letters she had written as evidence of her promise. Molly intervenes on Cynthia's behalf and manages to break off the engagement and get back the letters; her interactions with him give rise to rumours that she is romantically involved with Preston herself, and she becomes the subject of malicious gossip. This leads to an emotional scene in which both Dr Gibson and Mrs Gibson discover Cynthia's involvement with Mr Preston. After this, Cynthia breaks off her engagement to Roger, enduring rebukes and insults for her inconstancy, and quickly accepts and marries Mr Henderson, a professional gentleman she had met in London. Molly's reputation is restored only after she goes driving around town with Lady Harriet Cumnor, who is well aware of how fickle public opinion can be and wants to help Molly. Osborne, ill and convinced that he will die soon, begs Molly to remember his wife and child when he is gone. He dies shortly thereafter, and Molly reveals the existence of his wife and child to the grieving Squire Hamley. Osborne's widow, Aimée, arrives at Hamley Hall after receiving word that her husband is ill, and brings with her their little son, named for his uncle Roger but called "little Osborne" in honour of his father. This child is now the heir to the Hamley estate. Meanwhile, Roger has rushed home to be with his father, and his affection and good sense help the squire to see the possible joy to be had in this new family, especially the grandson. The squire manages to overcome his prejudice against Aimée's Catholicism and station and asks them both to live with him.

As Roger settles into the local scientific community, he begins to realise that his affection for Molly is more than that of a brother for a sister. Aided by the kind interference of Lady Harriet, who has always recognised Molly's worth and charms, he finds himself pained at the thought of Molly with anyone else. Still, he hesitates to express his feelings, thinking himself unworthy of her love after having thrown away his affection on the fickle Cynthia. Before he returns to Africa, he confides his feelings to Mr Gibson, who gives his blessing to the union. Roger's intention to speak to Molly before he leaves is thwarted by the need to isolate due to a scarlet fever scare.

Gaskell's narrative breaks off: she had died leaving the novel unfinished. She had related to a friend that she intended Roger to return and present Molly with a dried flower (a gift Molly had given him before his departure) as proof of his love. In the BBC adaptation of the novel, an alternative ending was written in which Roger finds himself unwilling to leave Molly without speaking to her of his love and they marry and return to Africa together.

== Television and radio adaptations ==
In 1971, a six part television series directed by Hugh David was made, with the screenplay adapted from the novel by Michael Voysey. It featured Zhivila Roche as Molly Gibson, Alan MacNaughtan as Dr. Gibson, and Helen Christie as Clare Kirkpatrick.

A radio adaptation, dramatized in nine hour-long parts by Barry Campbell and directed by Jane Morgan, was produced in 1983 and first broadcast on BBC Radio 4 in August that year. It starred Tom Wilkinson and Kathryn Hurlbutt. The music is by Rachel Portman.

In 1999, BBC produced a four-part serial based on the novel with a screenplay written by Andrew Davies; Wives and Daughters featuring Justine Waddell, Bill Paterson, Francesca Annis, Keeley Hawes, Rosamund Pike, Tom Hollander, Anthony Howell, Michael Gambon, Penelope Wilton, Barbara Flynn, Deborah Findlay, Iain Glen, Barbara Leigh-Hunt, and Ian Carmichael.

A second radio adaptation was broadcast by BBC Radio 4 Extra in November 2010. It was a single two-hour fifteen-minute segment and was part of a larger collection of Gaskell's works, including North & South, Ruth, and Cranford, in audio drama form. It was produced by Peter Leslie Wild and starred Deborah McAndrew as Mrs Gaskell and Emerald O'Hanrahan as Molly Gibson.
