= Assassination of Thomas Ashton =

1831 murder in Manchester, England

Thomas Ashton assassination
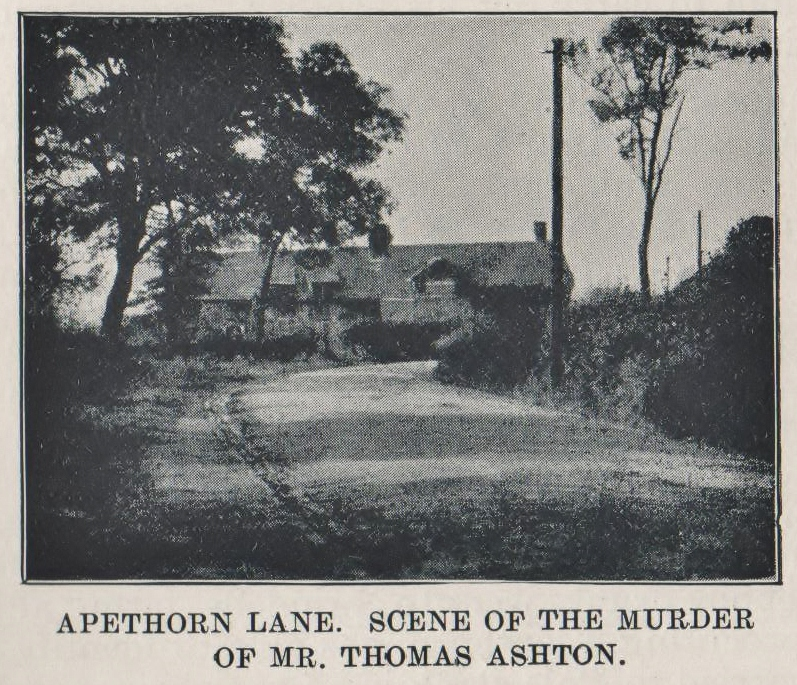
- Location of the murder
- Location: Hyde, Greater Manchester, England
- Date: 3 January 1831 around 7:00 p.m. (Greenwich Mean Time)
- Target: Thomas Ashton
- Deaths: 1
- Perpetrators: James Garside, Joseph Mosley, William Mosley

The assassination of Thomas Ashton, a British industrialist and mill-owner, took place at around 7:00 p.m. on 3 January 1831. Ashton was shot dead by striking workers in Manchester as a warning to their employers. The attack occurred in the midst of the rising tensions of the late Georgian era due to the Industrial Revolution and the subsequent emergence of the Chartist and trade-union movements to combat the extreme poverty of major industrial cities such as Manchester at the time.

The assassination is widely considered to have inspired Elizabeth Gaskell's first novel, Mary Barton (1848). Gaskell, however, denied that she had based the book on Ashton's death.

== Assassination and trial ==
Three men were implicated in the crime - James Garside, Joseph Mosley and William Mosley. The men mistook Thomas for his brother Samuel, a manager of the mill. The judge and jury decided that Garside had pulled the trigger, despite it being his information which had originally led to the arrests; it was ruled that he had been hoping to blame his accomplices. William Mosley's account of the murder ran as follows:

'A short space afterwards there came a man down the footpath towards the clap gate. The man was in the footpath leading from Mr. Ashton's. Garside got up, and met him in the field before he got through the gate, and pointed the piece at him. He gave way. Garside fired. When Mr. Ashton gave way he only went a little out of the way. Garside met him, and he went back. He had got through the clap gate when he fired, and was going along the road to the mill. The man who was shot fell across the road, with his head towards the right hand side, opposite to where I was. We immediately ran away, and I made the best of my way across the fields to the second canal bridge.'

== Background ==
As a centre of capitalism, Manchester was frequently the scene of labour riots and calls for greater political recognition by the city's working and non-titled classes - resulting in events such as the Peterloo Massacre of August 1819. The year prior to Ashton's death also saw major uprisings and rebellions against the Bourbon monarchy in the July Revolution of France, which stimulated radical and Chartist progression in England. William Mosley recounted that when he asked Garside which of the Ashtons he had shot, the response was 'it didn't matter which it was; it was one of them.'
