= 84 Plymouth Grove =

Building in Manchester, England

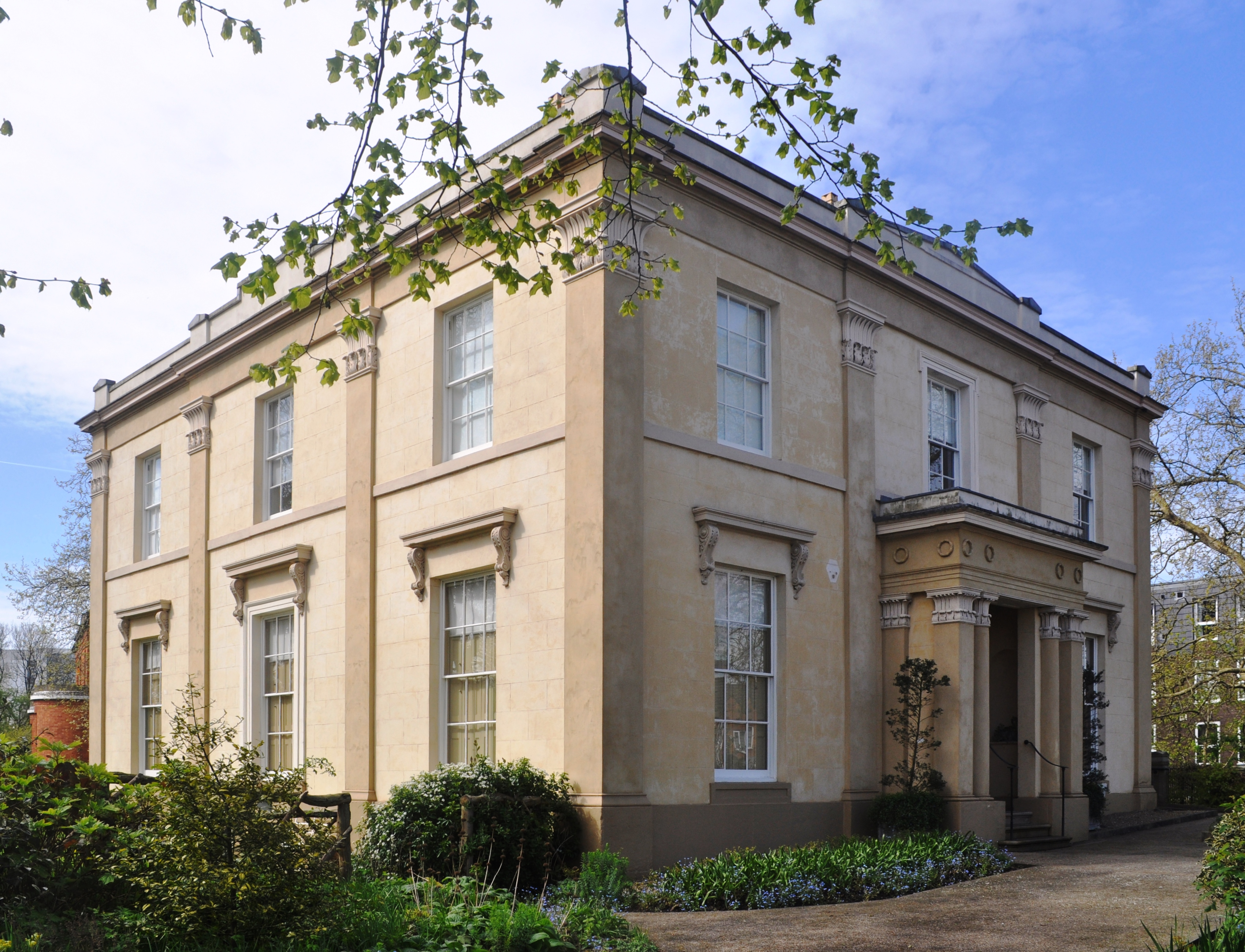
- The front and side façades of 84 Plymouth Grove, now known as Elizabeth Gaskell's House
- Former names: 42 Plymouth Grove
- Alternative names: Gaskell House

General information
- Architectural style: Neoclassical
- Location: Manchester, England
- Coordinates: 53°27′49″N 2°13′16″W
- Completed: c. 1838
- Owner: Manchester Historic Buildings Trust

Design and construction
- Architect: Richard Lane
- Designations

Listed Building – Grade II*
- Official name: Mrs Gaskells House
- Designated: 25 February 1952
- Reference no.: 1271082

Website
- elizabethgaskellhouse.co.uk

84 Plymouth Grove, now known as Elizabeth Gaskell's House, is a writer's house museum in Manchester, England. (Note: 84 Plymouth Grove has been variously described as located within Ardwick, Chorlton-on-Medlock, Longsight and Victoria Park.) The Grade II*-listed neoclassical villa was the residence of William and Elizabeth Gaskell from 1850 until their deaths in 1884 and 1865 respectively. The Gaskell household continued to occupy the villa after the deaths of Elizabeth and William. The death of Elizabeth's daughter, Margaret Emily "Meta" Gaskell, in 1913, brought to an end the Gaskells' residence there.

The house itself was granted listed building status in 1952, partly due to its association with the Gaskells. This granted it protection from demolition, however, 84 Plymouth Grove slowly descended into a state of disrepair due to neglect.

The Manchester Historic Buildings Trust commenced a restoration project in 2009, aiming to see 84 Plymouth Grove returned to its state as the Gaskells left it. By 2011, the Trust had finished the exterior, which included structural repairs and removing the pink paint that had coated the house for various years. However, in May 2011 their project was marred by the theft of the lead roof, which caused "extensive damage" according to the BBC. On completion of the £2.5 million restoration, the building was reopened to the public on 5 October 2014.

== History ==
84 Plymouth Grove was designed in the Regency style, probably by architect Richard Lane, c. 1838, and was speculatively built as part of a wider development catering to the burgeoning middle-classes in the area, then on the outskirts of the city. The villa comprised drawing and dining rooms, seven bedrooms and a coach house wing. The lavish house was built in response to the newly emerging middle class citizens of Manchester. The city, which had rapidly expanded due to the Industrial Revolution, held various degrees of housing, ranging from, poverty-ridden slum housing to the new era of luxurious housing such as 84 Plymouth Road.

The design is striking; the house contains 20 rooms on two floors over a concealed basement with a front porch containing four columns carved with a lotus leaf shape, reminiscent of the Tower of the Winds in Athens. Stucco features on the front façade of the house. Despite the house's façade having a pink coat for years, earning it the nickname 'The Pink House', during the times of Elizabeth Gaskell the walls were described as a "stone-colour".

=== The Gaskells' residence ===
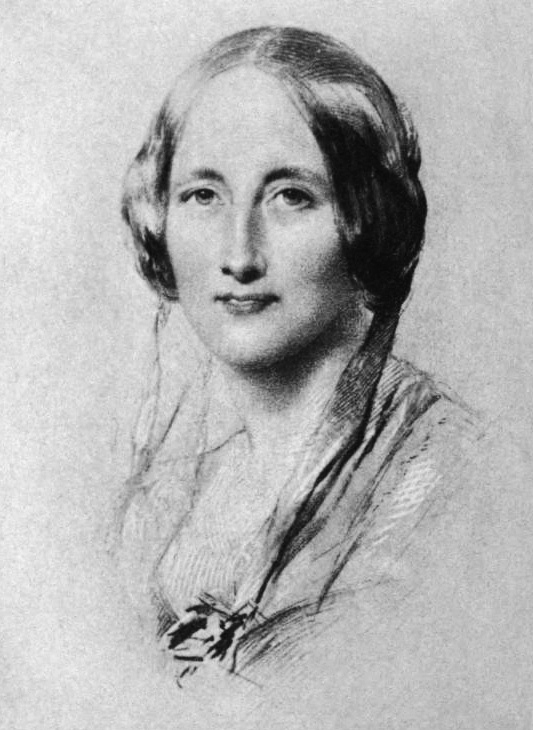
Elizabeth Gaskell, in portrait of 1851 by George Richmond

Elizabeth and William, along with their children, Marianne, Margaret Emily "Meta", Florence, and Julia, moved into the house (then numbered 42 Plymouth Grove) in June 1850, after the publication of Elizabeth's first novel, Mary Barton. However, they had lived in Manchester for some time previously, as William Gaskell's job of assistant Minister at Cross Street Unitarian Chapel required the family to move from Knutsford, in neighbouring Cheshire. The family had stayed at two different locations in Manchester, both of which have now been demolished.

84 Plymouth Grove's spacious accommodation concerned Gaskell, who, despite calling the house "a beauty", was concerned about residing in such an expensive house (the rent was £150 per annum) while others lived in poverty. Despite Elizabeth's concerns, the Gaskells were not frugal, with the 20 room house costing half of William's salary in rent. Elizabeth, feeling guilty, justified it by stating, "It is [William] who is to decide on all these things". Until the birth of their children they required only one servant, Betsy, however, at Plymouth Grove many more domestic staff were employed, including a cook, several maids, a handyman for outdoor work, as well as a washerwoman and a seamstress. Elizabeth trained her staff and looked after their welfare whilst they were employed at the house.

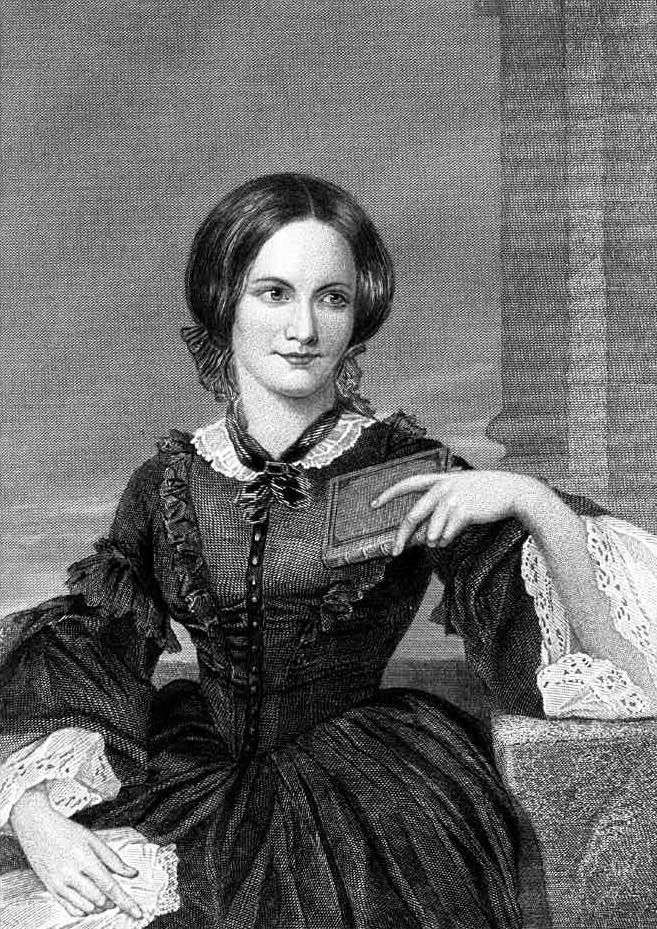
Charlotte Brontë, one of the many guests who stayed at 84 Plymouth Grove on various occasions

Charlotte Brontë, who visited the house three times between 1851 and 1854, described it as "a large, cheerful, airy house, quite out of Manchester smoke". The "Manchester smoke", as Brontë described it, was generated from the hundreds of textile factories and cotton mills situated within the inner city, in particular the Ancoats area. In the 1850s there were over 100 mills in Manchester. On one occasion, the meek Brontë even hid behind the curtains in Gaskells' drawing room as she was too shy to meet the other guests.

Barbara Brill, biographer of William Gaskell, stated that "Plymouth Grove could be likened to the activities of a beehive", due to the Gaskells entertaining many guests whilst living at the house. Besides Brontë, visitors to the house during Elizabeth Gaskell's lifetime included Charles Dickens, who, on one occasion in 1852, made an impromptu visit to the house, along with his wife at 10 am, much to the dismay of Elizabeth, who mentioned it to be "far too early". John Ruskin, Harriet Beecher Stowe, American writer Charles Eliot Norton and conductor Charles Hallé also visited Elizabeth Gaskell at Plymouth Grove. Hallé visited the house often, teaching Meta Gaskell how to play the piano.

Gaskell lived at Plymouth Grove with her family until her death 15 years later, in 1865, and all of her later books were written there, including some of her most famous works, such as Cranford and North and South. Gaskell died in Alton, Hampshire, in a house she had just secretly purchased, without informing William. She had planned to entice William into leaving Manchester and retiring there, but she collapsed suddenly in the arms of Meta, and died on 12 November 1865. Her husband William, a Unitarian minister and educationalist, survived Elizabeth by nearly two decades, dying in 1884 of bronchitis. Upon his death, his two surviving unmarried daughters, Meta and Julia, lived in the house (his two other daughters, Marianne and Florence, had both married, though Florence died three years prior to William's death). The two sisters continued living at Plymouth Grove and both were involved in various charitable causes throughout their lives. Julia, despite being the youngest, died before Meta, in October 1908, leaving Meta alone at 84 Plymouth Grove.

=== Meta Gaskell's death ===
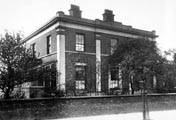
The house, pictured in 1913, the year that the Gaskells' occupancy ended

"	WOULD BUY GASKELL HOME. Suggestion That Manchester Make It a Literary Museum LONDON, 28 Jan..—A suggestion made by Derwent Simpson, and supported by The Manchester Guardian, is that the home of the Gaskell family in Plymouth Grove, Manchester, should be bought by the Manchester Corporation and be made a literary museum.	"
— 8 February 1914, The New York Times

In 1913 Meta Gaskell, the last of the Gaskells residing at Plymouth Grove, died, ending the family's 63 year occupancy of the villa. Meta was not, however, the last living Gaskell daughter. Marianne Gaskell, the eldest child, married, had three children and lived until 1920. Many suggested that the house become a public museum dedicated to Gaskell and her literary works, with the idea being supported by The Manchester Guardian.

The New York Times stated that the conversion to a museum could be achieved at "small expense", as it could sell some of the land belonging to the house for development. Despite the suggestion, the idea was rejected by the local authority, with The Manchester Guardian quoting them as stating, "The house belonged to one of the ugliest periods of architecture and was of no value beyond its association with the Gaskell family." Hopes of turning 84 Plymouth Grove into a museum were soon extinguished, and the house was simply left there. The University of Manchester purchased the building in 1969, converting it for use by the International Society. The university relinquished the building in 2000.

The house was listed Grade II* on the National Heritage List for England in February 1952.

== Restoration ==
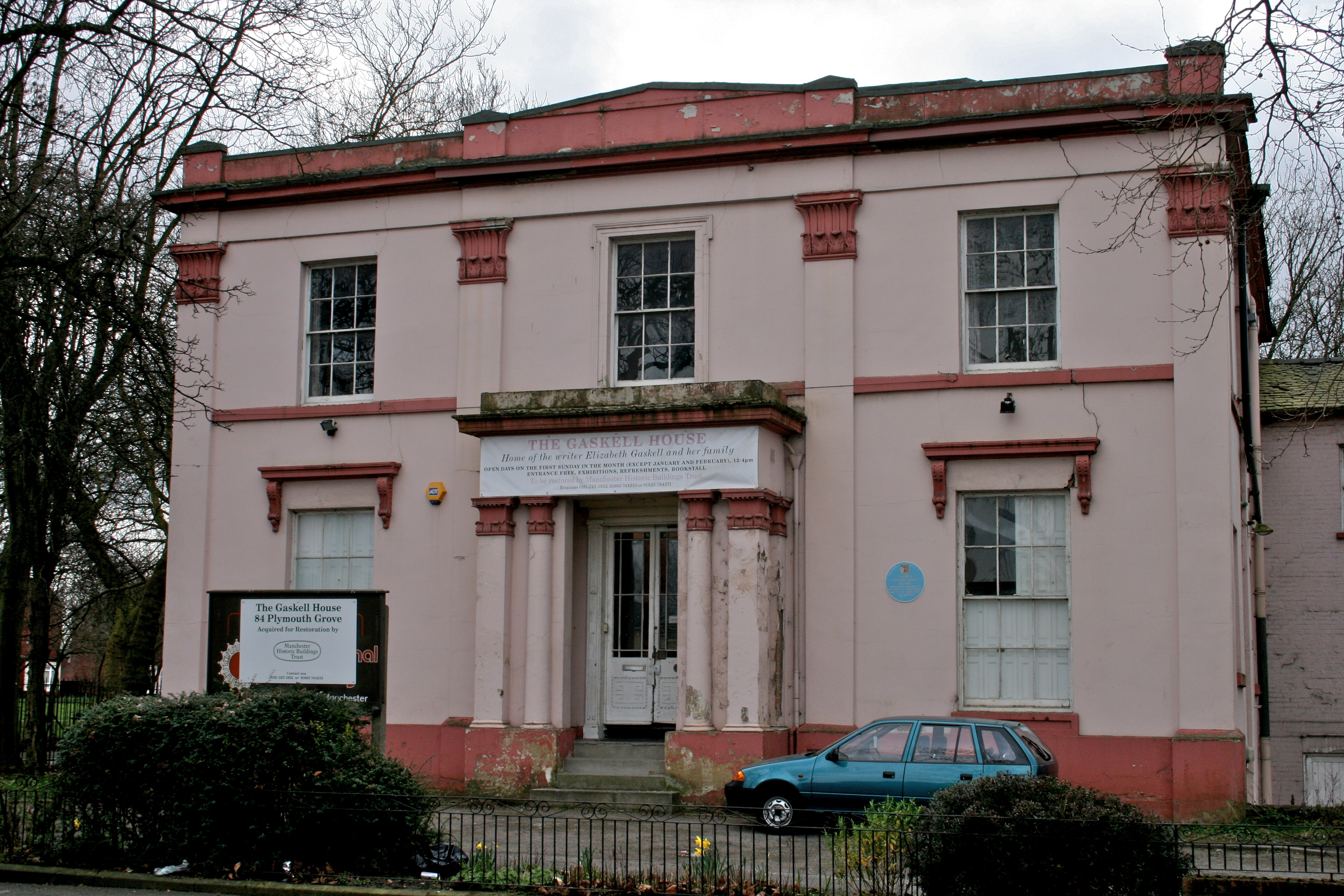
84 Plymouth Grove pictured in 2009, immediately before restoration work began

The building was purchased in 2004 by the Manchester Historic Buildings Trust, with the aim of restoring the building and allowing it to be opened to the public. A blue commemorative plaque on the front of the house reads: "Elizabeth Cleghorn Gaskell (1810–1865) Novelist and authoress of Mary Barton and Cranford and many other works lived here (1850–1865)". In 2006, the house was in a very poor state of repair with severe structural problems, and was listed on the English Heritage Buildings at Risk Register. An article in The Independent noted the state of disrepair: "Structural cracks run through the walls, the foundations have to be underpinned, the whole roof replaced and dry rot eradicated, while the entire building must be restored and upgraded."

Restoration work began in September 2009. The house stands within a five-minute walk of Victoria Baths, another Victorian-era landmark requiring substantial restoration. The villa was given a £750,000 restoration of its exterior and a new roof was placed on the house in 2010. Lead was used at the insistence of English Heritage. However, in May 2011, metal thieves stole most of the lead from the new roof, which caused £250,000 worth of damage in the process and allowed rainwater into the house. The remaining lead was removed from the roof to deter any further thefts and a new roof constructed in its place.

Work on the first phase of restoration, which fixed the roof, drains and structural damage, finished in February 2013, with most of the external work complete and the building made water-tight. During this time, the pink paint covering the house was stripped off and replaced with an off-white colour.

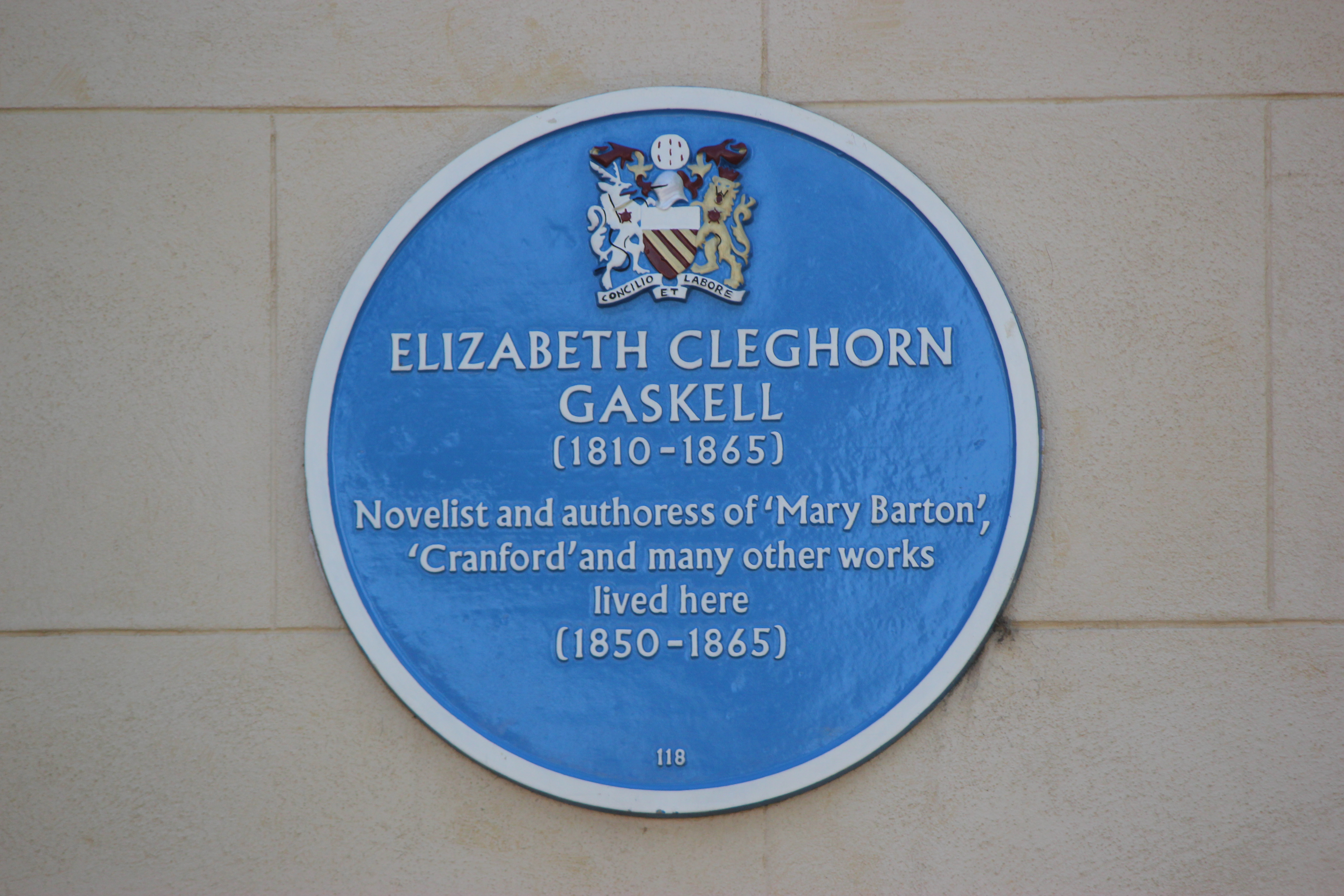
A plaque in honour of Elizabeth Gaskell adorns the front of the house

In June 2012, it was announced that a grant of £1.85 million from the Heritage Lottery Fund had been secured, allowing restoration of the house's interior to take place. The funding paid for the restoration of the bedrooms and reception rooms and created a visitor learning area. The lottery grant was also used to help restore the house's garden, where the Gaskells once kept pigs, poultry and a cow.

The ground floor of the house has been fully restored in the style of an authentic Victorian home. Curators of the house researched what 84 Plymouth Grove would have looked like during the Gaskells' residence and borrowed a number of period items of furniture from Manchester's art galleries and the John Rylands Library in order to recreate the Gaskells' study and other rooms. Heritage experts from the Whitworth Art Gallery were consulted to help find the right wallpaper and paint colours that would have been used in the house at the time. Armitage Construction, a specialist heritage firm founded in 1874, restored the decorative plasterwork and carpentry in the house using traditional lime plaster and woodworking techniques from the period. In February 2014, the renovators of the house were seeking a donation of a mid-19th century Broadwood demi grand piano, the model that Charles Hallé used to teach Elizabeth's daughters at the house, for the drawing room of 84 Plymouth Grove.

The upstairs of the house has a number of rooms and performance spaces dedicated to educational work, literary and community events. Gaskell House reopened to the public on 5 October 2014. Curators of 84 Plymouth Grove hope that literary tourism will benefit the house, and make it a destination similar to Shakespeare's Birthplace in Stratford-upon-Avon or the Brontë Parsonage Museum in Haworth.

== Gallery ==
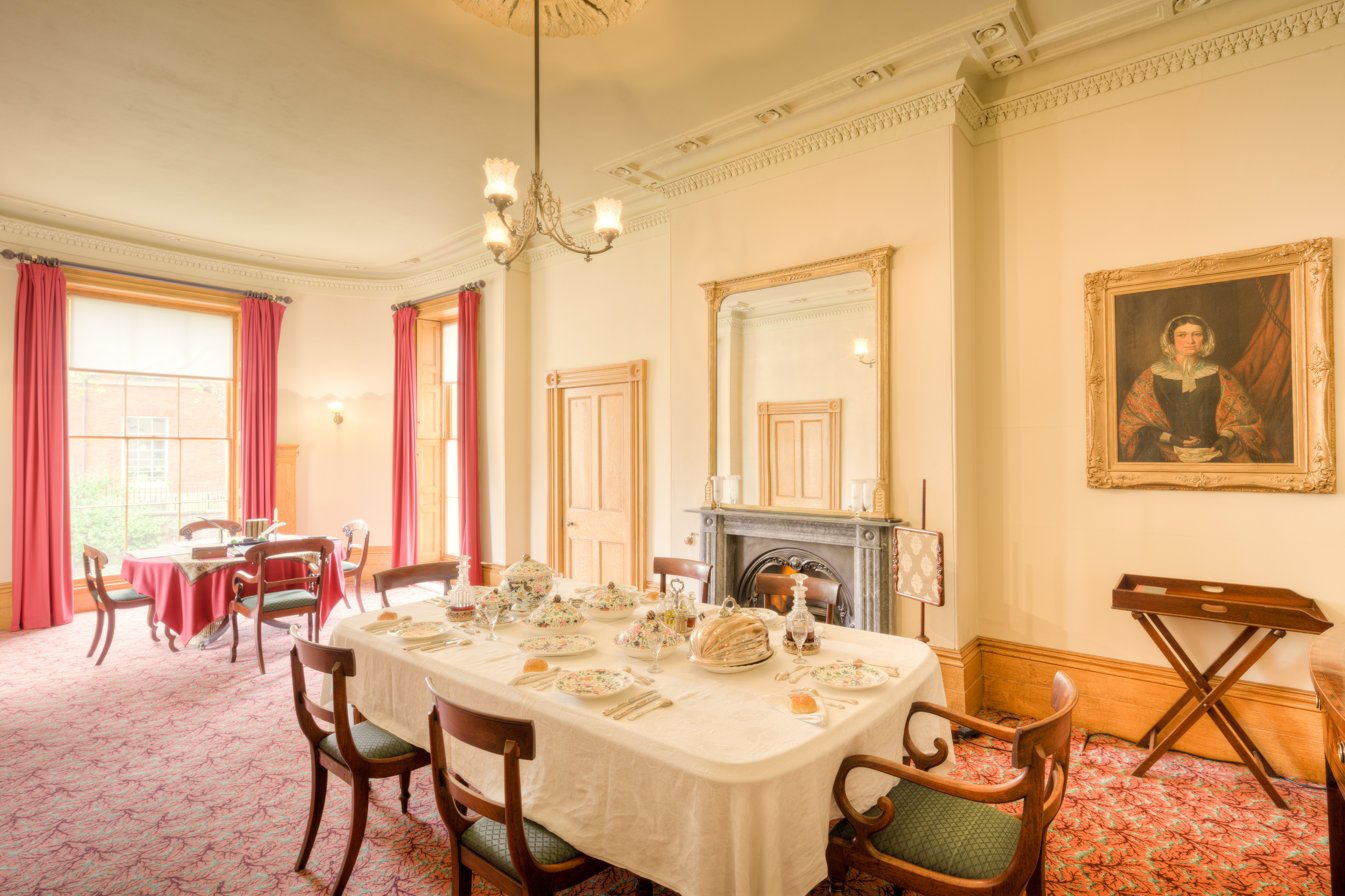
The Dining Room

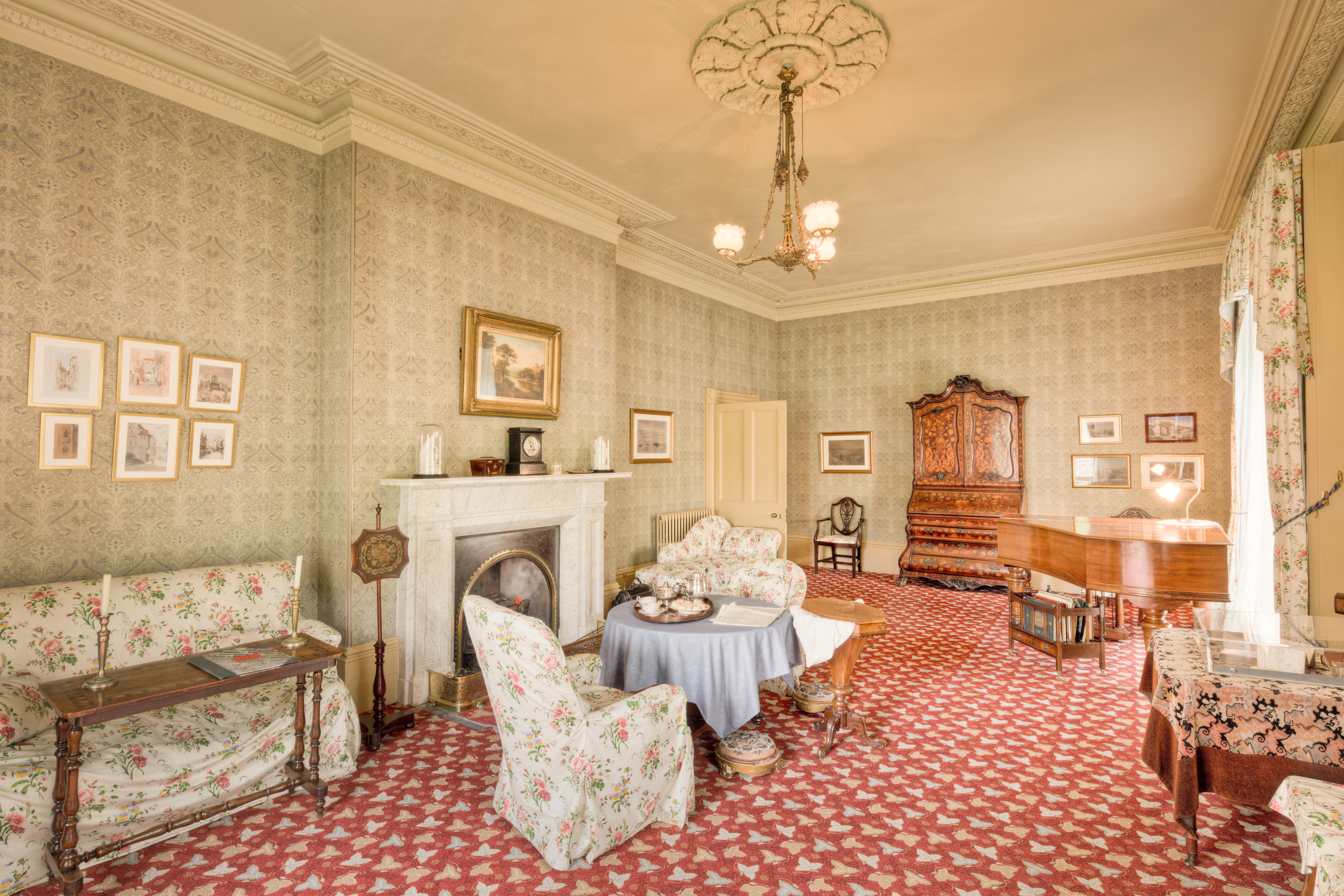
The Drawing Room

The Study Room

== See also ==
- Grade II* listed buildings in Greater Manchester
- Listed buildings in Manchester-M13
