= William Gaskell =

British Unitarian minister and charity worker (1805–1884)

The Reverend William Gaskell
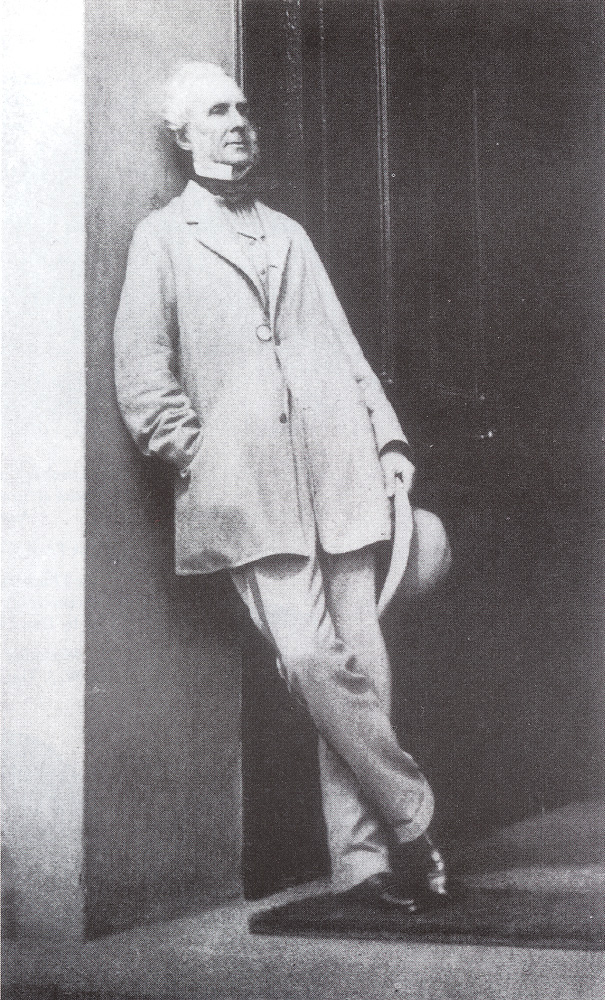
- William Gaskell on holiday in Scotland (photograph by Rupert Potter, father of Beatrix Potter)
- Born: 24 July 1805; Latchford, Cheshire, England
- Died: 12 June 1884 (aged 78); Manchester, England
- Education: University of Glasgow; Manchester New College
- Occupations: Unitarian minister, educator
- Spouse: Elizabeth Stevenson (m. 1832; died 1865)
- Children: 5

William Gaskell (24 July 1805 – 12 June 1884) was an English Unitarian minister, charity worker and pioneer in the education of the working class. The husband of novelist and biographer Elizabeth Gaskell, he was himself a writer and poet, and acted as the longest-serving Chair of the Portico Library from 1849 to his death in 1884.

His personal theology was Priestleian rationalism; he rejected the doctrine of original sin, believing humans to have an innate capacity for good, and this belief seems to have underpinned his lifelong commitment to charitable and educational projects. Unlike many of his Manchester contemporaries, Gaskell always favoured social and educational work above political lobbying for free trade or factory reform. His personal philosophy can perhaps be summarised in his dedication which he penned at the publication of his poetry collection Temperance Rhymes: 'to the working men of Manchester ... in the hope that they may act as another small weight on the right end of that lever which is to raise them in the scale of humanity.'

== Early life and education ==
Gaskell was born in Latchford, a suburb of Warrington, the eldest of six children. The Gaskell family were prominent Dissenters. His father, also William, was a sailcloth manufacturer with a business on Buttermarket Street and also a Unitarian theology teacher; according to one source, his mother, Margaret Jackson, was a housemaid. He was tutored by a local minister, Joseph Saul. Barred as a non-conformist from attending Oxford or Cambridge, Gaskell studied at Glasgow University (1820–25), taking his BA and MA in 1825. He then trained for the Unitarian ministry at Manchester New College (1825–28), at that time located in York, where his tutors included Charles Wellbeloved and James Turner.

== Work ==
=== Ministry ===
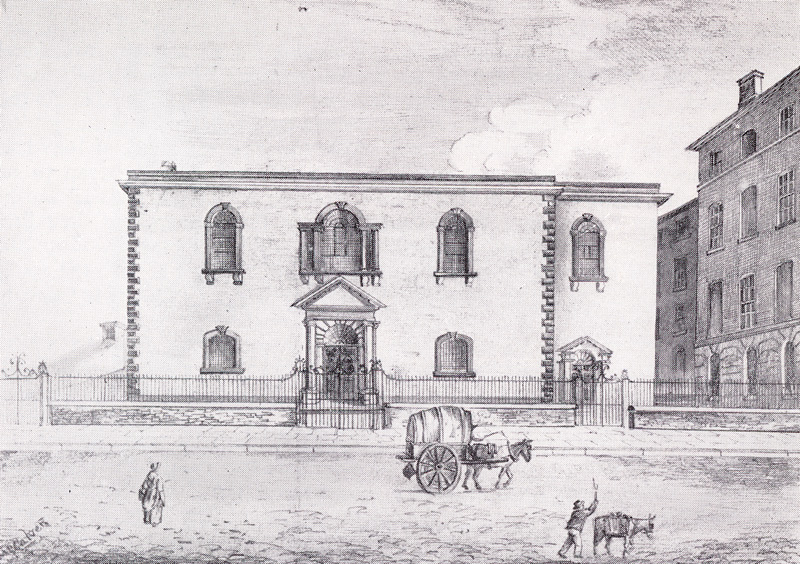
Cross Street Chapel c. 1835

Gaskell was the assistant minister of Cross Street Chapel in Manchester from 1828 to 1854, and senior minister thereafter, a position he held until his death. Founded in 1694, Cross Street was the major Unitarian chapel of the city, and its congregation contained many influential Manchester figures, at one time including five MPs. The prominent public health reformers James P. Kay (later Sir James Kay-Shuttleworth), Benjamin Heywood and Samuel and William Rathbone Greg were all associated with the chapel. Contemporaries considered Gaskell to be a brilliant preacher, though he never spoke extemporaneously; he was certainly a hard-working one, often preaching three times on Sundays.

The Ministers of the Chapel by and large abstained from overt political involvement, but they were active in social work, underpinning the thrust of their laypeople. William Gaskell led the congregation from 1828 to 1884, exercising wide influence within and outside the Unitarian movement. He supported the Manchester Domestic Mission Society, which assisted the poor “in such a way that at no time should any denominational or sectarian name or test be introduced”. He championed the Lower Mosley Street Schools, which the Cross Street Chapel sponsored to serve the areas near the River Medlock. A Fellowship Fund supported congregations in poorer locations. A nurse superintended by a lady of the congregation was financed to visit poor families near the town centre. Gaskell worked for education opportunities for the area's working class, and advocated for the Mechanics Institute movement.

Gaskell was legendary in humanitarian efforts. To honor his fifty-year point in the Cross Street ministry, a soirée was held in Manchester Town Hall; it was attended by over one thousand people. The congregation honored him with a gift of silverware, and during the festivities a large sum of money was raised for the founding of a scholarship for ministerial students at Owen's College (now Manchester University).

William Gaskell was supported in his educational and humanitarian work by his wife, the novelist Elizabeth Gaskell.

He came to be numbered among the most prominent Unitarians in the country; in 1859, he was offered the ministry at Essex Street Chapel in London, the leading post in the British Unitarian ministry, but turned it down, preferring to remain at Cross Street. From 1865, he served as President of the Assembly of Presbyterian and Unitarian Ministers of Lancashire and Cheshire. In 1861 he co-founded the Unitarian Herald, a publication aimed at the working-class audience, and was an editor until 1875.

=== Charitable works ===
Throughout his life, Gaskell worked for numerous local charitable concerns to alleviate poverty, improve living conditions and reduce the transmission of disease, particularly epidemic cholera and typhus. During the 1830s–1860s, some of the worst conditions for the poor in England were to be found in Manchester. In 1845, Engels described one of the poorest slums, not far from the Gaskells' house:

'ruinous cottages behind broken windows, mended with oilskin, sprung doors, and rotten doorposts, [...] dark wet cellars, in measureless filth and stench...'

It was also a city of extreme social inequality between the so-called 'millocracy' and the workers; Elizabeth Gaskell once described an acquaintance attending a ball wearing £400 of lace and £10,000 in diamonds. The Gaskell family moved between the two worlds, allowing Gaskell not only to collect charitable subscriptions from their wide circle and promote longer-lasting changes from within the local bureaucracy, but also to understand the real concerns of those living in poverty, with whom he was probably more at ease. In 1833 he helped to found the non-denominational Manchester Domestic Home Mission, and he acted as its secretary for many years. Inspired by a visit from Boston minister Joseph Tuckerman, the mission gave practical assistance such as food and blankets to the poor. He was also active in the District Provident Society, an organisation founded by James Kay and William Langton with similar pragmatic aims. Gaskell supported public health measures and housing reform, sitting on the committee of the Manchester and Salford Sanitary Association, as well as another committee formed to regulate beer halls in the area.

=== Education and societies ===
Gaskell was a gifted teacher and lecturer, with a lifelong determination to expand the educational opportunities available to the working classes in Manchester. Such opportunities were limited in the 1830s; a Manchester Statistical Society report of 1834 showed that, with the exception of Manchester Grammar School and Chetham's Hospital, the main establishments involved in educating the poor were Sunday Schools. These schools gave children of 5–15 years a few hours of education each Sunday, with two-thirds of children benefitting. Two-thirds of the Sunday Schools worked outside the Church of England.

Both the Gaskells taught at the two Mosley Street Sunday Schools, which instructed young mill workers. Lessons covered basic numeracy and literacy in addition to traditional Biblical teaching, and Gaskell defended the practice of giving non-religious instruction on a Sunday, saying that they were doing 'their Father's business' by teaching reading. He and others lobbied successfully in 1832 for the two schools to be moved to improved premises, and some 400 pupils had been enrolled by 1847.

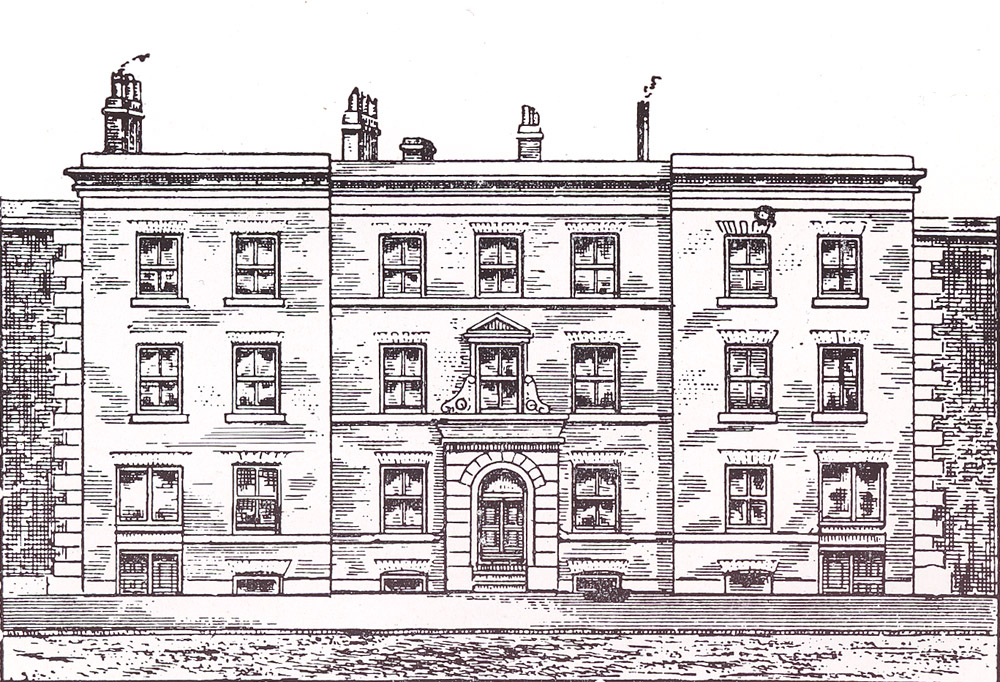
Manchester Mechanics' Institute, Cooper Street (1825)

In 1836, Gaskell started to give evening classes at the Manchester Mechanics' Institute, which was later to become the University of Manchester Institute of Science and Technology. Founded in 1824 to teach the poorest mill workers the institute was the first of its kind in the country. Its principal goal was to give mill workers sufficient knowledge so they might keep pace with the rapid technological progress of the time. From the first, however, Gaskell seems to have embraced the idea of a broader education: his initial lecture series was entitled 'The Poets and Poetry of Humble Life'. Elizabeth wrote that her husband's lectures aimed to increase appreciation of 'the beauty and poetry of many of the common things and daily events of life in its humblest aspect'. The lectures were popular, and Gaskell repeated them in several other venues. Who those 'humble poets' actually were no one knows but he is known to have studied J. F. Bryant and many other contemporary poets living in Manchester, including his friend, Samuel Bamford. Gaskell became renowned for his reading, which a former student described as 'clear and sweet'; his reading of poetry was recalled to have 'a peculiar charm, for while he had a keen ear for the subtleties of rhyme, rhythm and metre, nothing was ever lost of the meaning or the beauty of the words'.

When the New College moved to Manchester in 1840 Gaskell continued to lecture on literature. From 1846 to 1853, he was Professor of history, English literature and logic at New College (Another professor was Gaskell's contemporary from his studies at York, the prominent Unitarian James Martineau.) When the college later moved to London, he served as Chairman of the Trustees. He also lectured at the Owens College, founded in 1846 with a legacy from John Owens (it became the Victoria University of Manchester in 1904). Beginning in 1858, Gaskell taught literature at the Manchester Working Men's College. He also gave private tutoring to both men and women; notable pupils included hymn translator Catherine Winkworth and her sister, the translator Susanna Winkworth. He was also chairman of the Portico Library in Manchester for 30 years.

In 1854 Gaskell co-founded (with John Beard) the Unitarian Home Missionary Board, which trained working-class Unitarian ministers. He taught literature, history, and New Testament Greek, initially from his study at Plymouth Grove. He became its Principal in 1874.

In addition to his tutoring and lecturing, Gaskell campaigned for better education for the working classes, co-founding the Lancashire Public Schools Association in 1847. He served on the committee of the Manchester Literary and Philosophical Society, which gave public lectures and campaigned for social change; in 1849, he became the Chairman of the Portico Library, a subscription lending library. In 1861, he helped to organise a meeting of the British Association for the Advancement of Science which brought scientists from across the world to Manchester. Gaskell seemed to relish the immense teaching burden he accumulated in later life. Elizabeth Gaskell complained that 'you might as well ask St Pauls to tumble down, as entreat him to give up this piece of work; which does interest him very much, & which no one could do so well certainly...' Though she was referring specifically to his Owens College lectures, he seems to have diligently pursued all his various projects, and found excuses to avoid giving up any obligation he had once started.

== Literature and writings ==
Gaskell had a fascination with language and was an expert on the Lancashire dialect. Extracts from his lectures on dialect were published in The Examiner, and the 1854 edition of Elizabeth Gaskell's first novel, Mary Barton, was accompanied by his notes on dialect. He published numerous pamphlets and sermons, and wrote or translated over seventy hymns, some of which are still sung.

His poem, "Sketches among the Poor, No. 1" (co-written with his wife in the manner of Crabbe), was published in Blackwood's Edinburgh Magazine in 1837, and his poetry collection Temperance Rhymes (1839) won the approval of Wordsworth. His poetry varied in form, but always employed plain language and attempted sensitive portrayals of characters drawn from the working classes. The poem "Manchester Song" supplies two of the chapter epigraphs to Mary Barton.

=== Religious writings ===
- The Person of Christ 1853

== Personal life and Elizabeth Gaskell ==
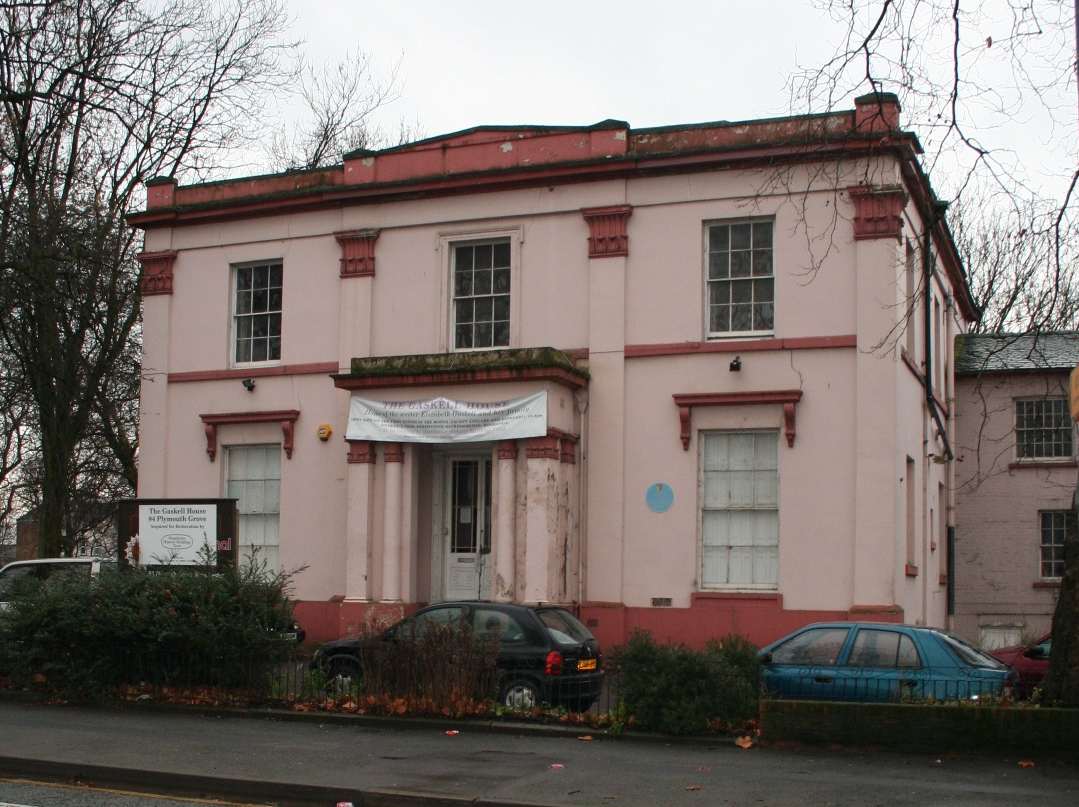
84 Plymouth Grove, Gaskell's home from 1850

Gaskell married Elizabeth Cleghorn Stevenson, daughter of the late Unitarian minister William Stevenson, in 1832. The couple had four surviving daughters.

Despite differences in personality, the couple seem to have had a strong relationship, although they frequently spent long periods apart, and Elizabeth Gaskell's biographer Jenny Uglow describes her as breathing more freely when William was away, but still always longing for his return. Unfortunately, none of Elizabeth's many letters to him survives.

Gaskell is said to have encouraged his wife to write her first novel as a distraction from her grief at the death of their infant son from scarlet fever in 1845. Elizabeth Gaskell's industrial novels Mary Barton and North and South were directly inspired by her experiences as a minister's wife in the cotton-manufacturing city of Manchester. Gaskell always encouraged his wife's writing, advising her on dialect, editing her manuscripts and acting as her literary agent. He also supported her when some of her novels, particularly Mary Barton and Ruth, drew strong criticism for their radical views, as well as through the threatened lawsuits over her biography of Charlotte Brontë.

Elizabeth died suddenly in 1865. William Gaskell survived his wife by almost two decades, working full-time until six months before his death, aided by his two unmarried daughters. He died of bronchitis in Manchester in 1884, and is buried beside Elizabeth at Brook Street Chapel, Knutsford.

== Legacy ==
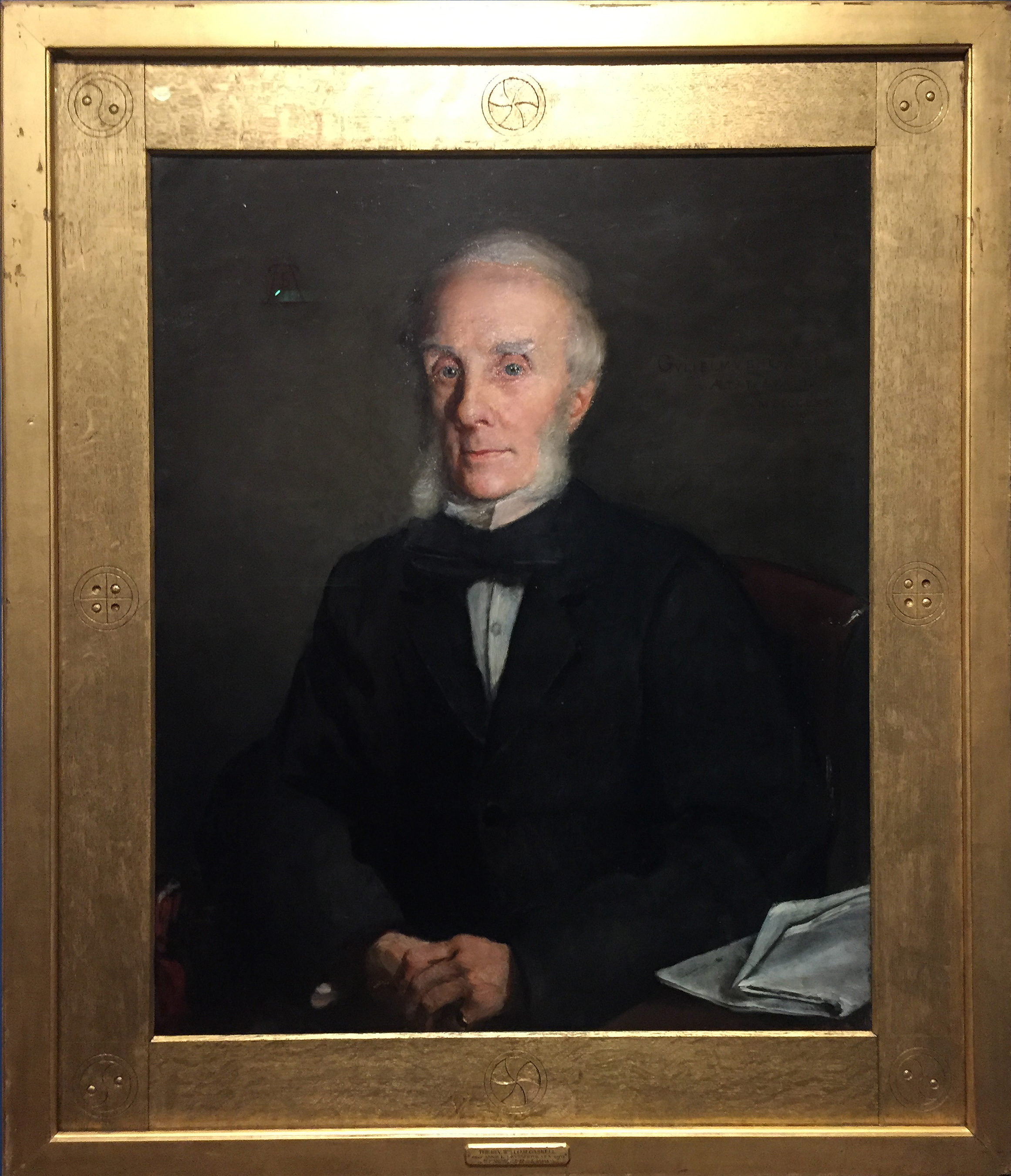
Rev. William Gaskell, by Annie Swynnerton

Gaskell's portrait and bust are on display at the new Cross Street Chapel. Gaskell was portrayed by Bill Nighy in the Granada Television mini-series, God's Messengers (1994).

== Sources ==
- Brill B. William Gaskell, 1805–1884 (Manchester Literary and Philosophical Publications; 1984) (ISBN 0-902428-05-5)
- Chapple JAV, Pollard A, eds. The Letters of Mrs Gaskell (Mandolin; 1997) (ISBN 1-901341-03-8)
- Uglow J. Elizabeth Gaskell: A Habit of Stories (Faber and Faber; 1993) (ISBN 0-571-20359-0)
