= The Poor Clare (short story) =

1856 short story by Elizabeth Gaskell

- Short story by Elizabeth Gaskell
- Country: United Kingdom
- Language: English
- Genre: Gothic ghost story

Publication
- Publisher: Household Words
- Publication date: 13–27 December 1856 (serialized)

"The Poor Clare" is a short story by English Victorian writer Elizabeth Gaskell. First serialised in three installments in 1856 Charles Dickens' popular magazine Household Words, "The Poor Clare" is a gothic ghost story about a young woman unwittingly cursed by her own grandmother.

== Plot ==
"The Poor Clare" is narrated by an unnamed young lawyer from London, reflecting on the "extraordinary incidents" of his youth.

Several decades before, Squire Starkey, a recusant Jacobite, returns to Starkey Manor with his Irish wife and their son Patrick. Accompanying them is their Irish Catholic servant, Madam Starkey's former nurse, Bridget FitzGerald and her daughter Mary, who take up a small cottage in the grounds of the manor. Bridget comes to exercise great control over the household. Some years later, due in part to an increasingly fractious relationship with her mother, Mary FitzGerald leaves Starkey Manor to take up a position on the Continent. Racked with grief at her daughter's departure, Bridget keeps to her cottage until Madam Starkey brings her a young spaniel, Mignon, who becomes her constant companion. She receives occasional letters from Mary, the last informing her that she was going to marry a gentleman.

Upon the deaths of Squire and Madam Starkey, Bridget is left alone at the cottage. After a long period without word from Mary, Bridget leaves the cottage for the Continent in search of her daughter, accompanied by Mignon. Years of unsuccessful searching later, she returns suddenly. Not long after her return, a hunting party goes shooting on the manor. One of the party, Mr Gisborne, is in a foul mood, and shoots Mignon for fun when it crosses his path. Distraught that the only remaining creature she loved is now dead, Bridget calls on the saints to curse Mignon's killer, vowing that the creature he loves best will become a terror loathed by all.

The narrator, who lives with his uncle in London to be trained in his legal practice, takes up a complicated inheritance case involving some property in Ireland. He discovers that the heir is a Bridget FitzGerald. Visiting her at her cottage, the Narrator is struck by Bridget's grief at the loss of her daughter, and promises to help discover her whereabouts.

During a holiday in Harrogate, the Narrator becomes interested in a striking young woman and her older companion Mrs Clarke, whom he sees on his walks across the moors. Eventually, he becomes acquainted with the couple, and he falls in love with the young woman. His eventual marriage proposal is rejected by Mrs Clarke, who tells him that there is a terrible secret which would prevent him from marrying her ward. When he presses the matter, Lucy recounts how two years before, she had become afflicted by the constant presence of a trouble-making demonic doppelganger. Her father sent her to live in the moors with Mrs Clarke to lead a pious life in order to free herself from the curse. Initially sceptical at Lucy's tale, the Narrator's incredulity disappears after he witnesses her demonic double firsthand.

That afternoon, the Narrator is informed by a letter from Sir Phillip that Mary Fitzgerald had a child with Mr Gisborne. Piecing together the clues, he realises that Lucy is the child and therefore the granddaughter of Bridget and heir to the Irish estates. Furthermore, he and Mrs Clarke realise that Bridget had unwittingly caused Lucy's condition when she cursed Mr Gisborne, not knowing that he was the father of her own granddaughter. Still in love with Lucy, the Narrator and his uncle throw all their energy into attempting to undo the curse. Revisiting Bridget's cottage in an attempt to get to the root of the curse, the Narrator informs her of the unintended consequences of her words, sending her into a paroxysm of guilt and grief. By the next morning, Bridget has vanished from the cottage, with the curse still not lifted.

With Bridget gone, the Narrator settles into despondency in his uncle's chambers in London. One night some months later, they are visited by Father Bernard, a Catholic priest from Lancashire, who explains that he brings information about Bridget Fitzgerald. When on a recent visit to Antwerp in the Austrian Netherlands, he happened upon her outside a church and took her confession. After hearing of her curse, he instructed her to undertake acts of charity as penance, and as a result, Bridget joined the Antwerp convent of Poor Clares, taking the name Sister Magdalen.

The Narrator travels to Antwerp, and stays there even as active rebellion breaks out amongst the Flemish against their Austrian rulers. Caught up in a skirmish, the Narrator sees Poor Clare nuns rushing to assist the wounded despite the heavy gunfire. By coincidence, Mr Gisborne, leader of the Austrian garrison, is set upon by the rebels, but is saved by Sister Magdalen, who recognises him and takes him to her cell to tend to his wounds. Days after the battle, the sound of a bell tolling can be heard coming from the convent; a bell that will only be rung when a nun is starving to death. Despite the war-induced famine, the people of Antwerp, including the Narrator, rush to the convent to assist. On reaching Sister Magdalen's cell, they find Mr Gisborne, having been nursed back to health by his curser. Rushing onwards, the crowd comes to the convent's chapel, and sees Sister Magdalen lying on a bier having just received absolution. With her dying breath, she whispers, "The curse is lifted."

== Publication history ==
Gaskell's short story was first published in serialized form in 1856 in Charles Dickens' popular weekly magazine Household Words. The three chapters appeared on the 13, 20, and 27 of December of that year. Gaskell had previously used the magazine to serialize her much longer works, Cranford and North and South in 1851–1853 and 1855 respectively. It later appeared in Round the Sofa and Other Tales, an anthology by Gaskell which used an elaborate framing device to link the many different stories. In most publications of "The Poor Clare" since then, whilst the text from Round the Sofa has been used, the framing device has been omitted.

== Themes ==
Religion is an important theme in "The Poor Clare". Roman Catholicism, largely illegal in England at the time during which the novel is set, features prominently, with most characters being Catholics. The "otherness" of the Catholic faith in England, emphasised by Bridget's patently Catholic devotions to the Virgin Mary and the saints add to her mysterious nature. A. W. Ward, in speaking on the "considerable Roman Catholic element" in the story's setting of Lancashire, writes that, "No setting could, therefore, have been more appropriately chosen for a story in which faith and superstition, bitter hatred and passionate devotion, are the "anthetically mix'd" ingredients." Most of the sympathetic characters, Bridget, the Starkey family, Sir Phillip, who saves Bridget from the local Protestants who would have burned her for a witch, and, presumably, Lucy herself, are all catholic. The Poor Clare convent is presented as being beyond rebuke, and Father Bernard is even referred to as "a good and wise man". This is especially striking considering Gaskell's strict Unitarian faith and general dislike towards Catholicism and the Irish. Gaskell's Unitarianism is reflected in the moral rationalism she employs in her treatment of "evil" throughout the story.

Despite the male narrator, feminism is another theme in "The Poor Clare". Bridget is a powerful woman who confronts the patriarchal establishment through her own powers. She has a "strong will" and "strong nature", which enable her to exert control over not just her employers the Starkey family, but the rest of the local population as well. A single woman the entire story, Bridget's later joining of the Poor Clares further subverts the expectations of women at the time. The service-centred life of a convent, independent of male control, stands in stark contrast to the motherhood and household-oriented role expected of women in Gaskell's era.
