= Round the Sofa =

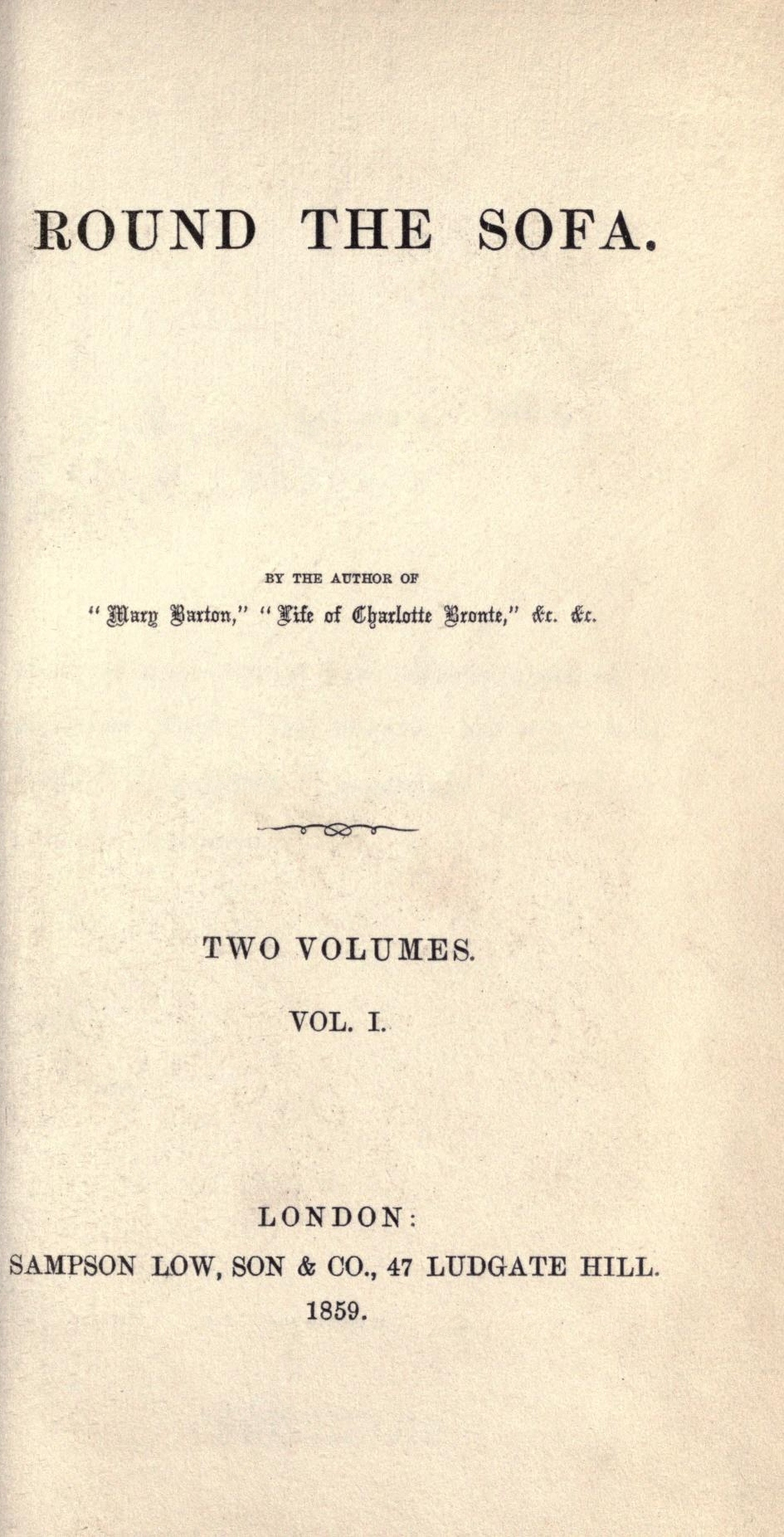
First edition title page from Round the Sofa; Volume 1 consists of the novel My Lady Ludlow prefaced a brief fictionalized introduction entitled Round the Sofa.

Round the Sofa is an 1859 2-volume collection consisting of a novel with a story preface and five short stories by Elizabeth Gaskell. The two volumes were published by Sampson Low, Son & Co. in London.

The 1859 2-volume set is unillustrated. The first volume consists of the novel My Lady Ludlow prefaced by a short story Round the Sofa, which is used to provide a framework for the telling of My Lady Ludlow and the disparate stories. Mrs. Dawson tells the story of "My Lady Ludlow" and then five other narrators gathered around the sofa each tell a story. The second volume consists of the short stories An Accursed Race, The Doom of the Griffiths, Half a Life-time Ago, The Poor Clare, and The Half-Brothers. The novel and three of the short stories were first published in Household Words. The Doom of the Griffiths was first published in Harper's New Monthly Magazine in January 1858. The Half-Brothers was first published in Fulcher's Ladies' Memorandum Book and Poetical Miscellany in 1856.

In 1861 Sampson Low, Son & Co. published a 1-volume second edition entitled My Lady Ludlow, and Other Tales; included in "Round the Sofa". In the 1861 book the lengths of the stories are: Round the Sofa, 6 p.; My Lady Ludlow, 164 p.; An Accursed Race, 15 p.; The Doom of the Griffiths, 33 p.; Half a Life-time Ago, 40 p.; The Poor Clare, 49 p.; The Half-Brothers, 10 p.
