= Elizabeth Gaskell =

English novelist, biographer, and short story writer (1810–1865)

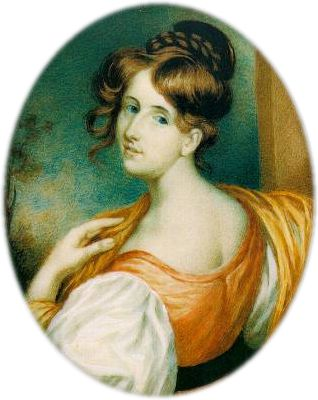
- 1832 miniature
- Born: Elizabeth Cleghorn Stevenson; 29 September 1810; Chelsea, London, England
- Died: 12 November 1865 (aged 55); Holybourne, Hampshire, England
- Occupation: Novelist
- Spouse: William Gaskell (m. 1832)
- Children: 5
- Writing career
- Period: 1848–1865

Elizabeth Cleghorn Gaskell (née Stevenson; 29 September 1810 – 12 November 1865), often referred to as Mrs Gaskell, was an English novelist, biographer, and short story writer. Her novels offer detailed studies of Victorian society, including the lives of the very poor. Her first novel, Mary Barton, was published in 1848. Her only biography The Life of Charlotte Brontë, published in 1857, was controversial and significant in establishing the Brontë family's lasting fame. Among Gaskell's best known novels are Cranford (1851–1853), North and South (1854–1855), and Wives and Daughters (1864–1866), all of which have been adapted for television by the BBC.

== Early life ==
She was born Elizabeth Cleghorn Stevenson on 29 September 1810 in Lindsey Row, Chelsea, London, now 93 Cheyne Walk. The doctor who delivered her was Anthony Todd Thomson, whose sister Catherine later became Gaskell's stepmother. She was the youngest of eight children; only she and her brother John survived infancy. Her father, William Stevenson, a Unitarian from Berwick-upon-Tweed, was minister at Failsworth, Lancashire, but resigned his orders on conscientious grounds. He moved to London in 1806 on the understanding that he would be appointed private secretary to James Maitland, 8th Earl of Lauderdale, who was to become Governor General of India. That position did not materialise, however, and Stevenson was nominated Keeper of the Treasury Records.

His wife, Elizabeth Holland, came from a family established in Lancashire and Cheshire that was connected with other prominent Unitarian families, including the Wedgwoods, the Martineaus, the Turners and the Darwins. When she died 13 months after giving birth to Gaskell, her husband sent the baby to live with Elizabeth's sister, Hannah Lumb, in Knutsford, Cheshire.

Her father remarried to Catherine Thomson, in 1814. They had a son, William, in 1815, and a daughter, Catherine, in 1816. Although Elizabeth spent several years without seeing her father, to whom she was devoted, her older brother John often visited her in Knutsford. John was destined for the Royal Navy from an early age, like his grandfathers and uncles, but he did not obtain preferment into the Service and had to join the Merchant Navy with the East India Company's fleet. John went missing in 1827 during an expedition to India.

== Character and influences ==
Much of Gaskell's childhood was spent in Cheshire, where she lived with her aunt Hannah Lumb in Knutsford, the town she immortalized as Cranford. They lived in a large red-brick house called The Heath (now Heathwaite). She grew to be a beautiful young woman, well-groomed, tidily dressed, kind, gentle, and considerate of others. Her temperament was calm and collected, joyous and innocent, she revelled in the simplicity of rural life.

From 1821 to 1826 she attended a school in Warwickshire run by the Misses Byerley, first at Barford and from 1824 at Avonbank outside Stratford-on-Avon, where she received the traditional education in arts, the classics, decorum and propriety given to young ladies from relatively wealthy families at the time. Her aunts gave her the classics to read, and she was encouraged by her father in her studies and writing. Her brother John sent her modern books, and descriptions of his life at sea and his experiences abroad.

After leaving school at the age of 16, she travelled to London to spend time with her Holland cousins. She also spent some time in Newcastle upon Tyne (with the Rev William Turner's family) and from there made the journey to Edinburgh. Her stepmother's brother was the miniature artist William John Thomson, who in 1832 painted her portrait (see top right). A bust was sculpted by David Dunbar at the same time.

== Married life and writing career ==
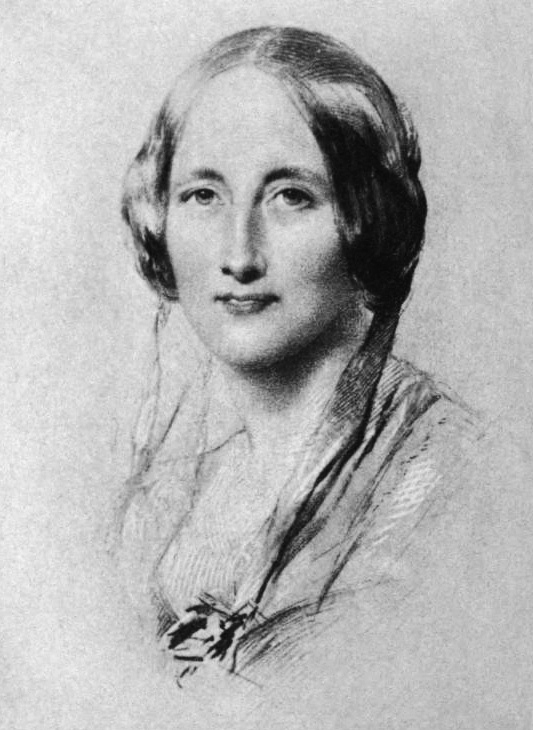
Elizabeth Gaskell: 1851 portrait by George Richmond

On 30 August 1832 Mrs. Gaskell married Unitarian minister William Gaskell, in Knutsford. They spent their honeymoon in North Wales, staying with her uncle, Samuel Holland, at Plas-yn-Penrhyn near Porthmadog. The Gaskells then settled in Manchester, where William was the minister at Cross Street Unitarian Chapel and longest-serving chair of the Portico Library. Manchester's industrial surroundings influenced Elizabeth's writing in the industrial genre. Their first daughter was stillborn in 1833. Their other children were Marianne (1834), Margaret Emily, known as Meta (1837), Florence Elizabeth (1842), and Julia Bradford (1846). Marianne and Meta boarded at the private school conducted by Rachel Martineau, sister of Harriet, a close friend of Elizabeth. Florence married Charles Crompton, a barrister and Liberal politician, in 1863.

In March 1835 Mrs. Gaskell began a diary documenting the development of her daughter Marianne: she explored parenthood, the values she placed on her role as a mother; her faith, and, later, relations between Marianne and her sister, Meta. In 1836 she co-authored with her husband a cycle of poems, Sketches among the Poor, which was published in Blackwood's Magazine in January 1837. In 1840 William Howitt published Visits to Remarkable Places containing a contribution entitled Clopton Hall by "A Lady", the first work written and published solely by her. In April 1840 Howitt published The Rural Life of England, which included a second work titled Notes on Cheshire Customs.

In July 1841, the Gaskells travelled to Belgium and Germany. German literature came to have a strong influence on her short stories, the first of which she published in 1847 as Libbie Marsh's Three Eras, in Howitt's Journal, under the pseudonym "Cotton Mather Mills". But other influences including Adam Smith's Social Politics enabled a much wider understanding of the cultural milieu in which her works were set. Her second story printed under the pseudonym was The Sexton's Hero. And she made her last use of it in 1848, with the publication of her story Christmas Storms and Sunshine.

For some 20 years beginning in 1843, the Gaskells took holidays at Silverdale on Morecambe Bay, and in particular stayed at Lindeth Tower. Daughters Meta and Julia later built a house, "The Shieling", in Silverdale.

A son, William, (1844–45), died in infancy, and this tragedy was the catalyst for Gaskell's first novel, Mary Barton. It was ready for publication in October 1848, shortly before they made the move south. It was an enormous success, selling thousands of copies. Ritchie called it a "great and remarkable sensation." It was praised by Thomas Carlyle and Maria Edgeworth. She brought the teeming slums of manufacturing in Manchester alive to readers as yet unacquainted with crowded narrow alleyways. Her obvious depth of feeling was evident, while her turn of phrase and description was described as the greatest since Jane Austen.

In 1850, the Gaskells moved to a villa at 84 Plymouth Grove. She took her cow with her. For exercise, she would happily walk three miles to help another person in distress. In Manchester, Elizabeth wrote her remaining literary works, while her husband held welfare committees and tutored the poor in his study. The Gaskells' social circle included writers, journalists, religious dissenters, and social reformers such as William and Mary Howitt and Harriet Martineau. Poets, patrons of literature and writers such as Lord Houghton, Charles Dickens and John Ruskin visited Plymouth Grove, as did the American writers Harriet Beecher Stowe and Charles Eliot Norton, while the conductor Charles Hallé, who lived close by, taught piano to one of their daughters. Elizabeth's friend Charlotte Brontë stayed there three times, and on one occasion hid behind the drawing room curtains as she was too shy to meet the Gaskells' other visitors.

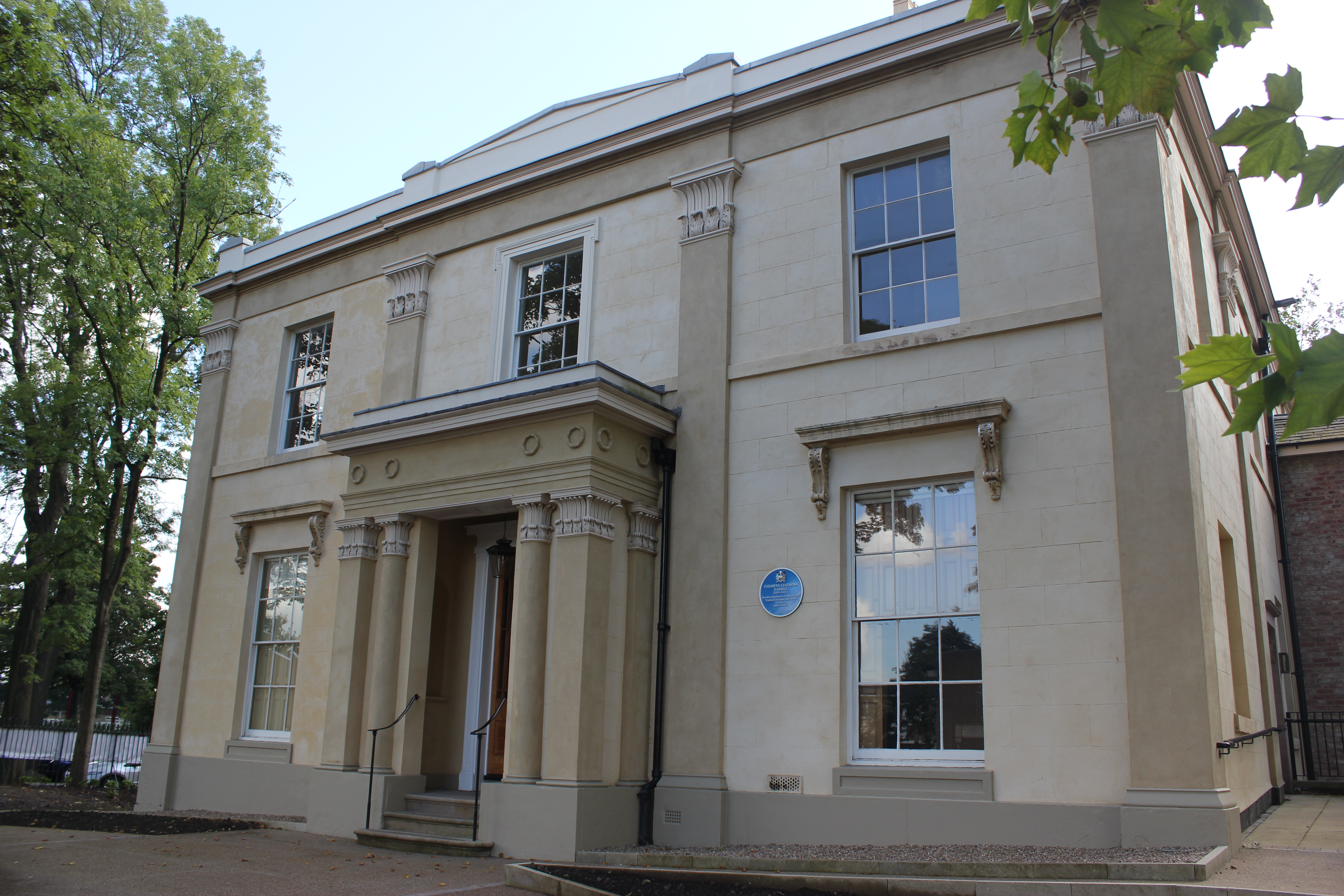
Gaskell House, Plymouth Grove, Manchester

In early 1850 Gaskell wrote to Charles Dickens asking for advice about assisting a girl named Pasley whom she had visited in prison. Pasley provided her with a model for the title character of Ruth in 1853. Lizzie Leigh was published in March and April 1850, in the first numbers of Dickens's journal Household Words, in which many of her works were to be published, including Cranford and North and South, her novella My Lady Ludlow, and short stories.

In June 1855, Patrick Brontë asked Gaskell to write a biography of his daughter Charlotte, and consequently she published The Life of Charlotte Brontë in 1857, a significant development in Gaskell's literary career. Her choice to privilege Brontë's private life over her public literary career was unconventional and proved controversial. In 1859 Gaskell travelled to Whitby to gather material for Sylvia's Lovers, which was published in 1863. Her novella Cousin Phyllis was serialized in The Cornhill Magazine from November 1863 to February 1864. The serialization of her last novel, Wives and Daughters, began in August 1864 in The Cornhill.

She died of a heart attack in 1865, while visiting a house she had purchased in Holybourne, Hampshire. Wives and Daughters was published in book form in early 1866, first in the United States and then, ten days later, in Britain.

== Reputation and re-evaluation ==
Mrs. Gaskell's reputation from her death to the 1950s was epitomised by Lord David Cecil's assessment in Early Victorian Novelists (1934) that she was "all woman" and "makes a creditable effort to overcome her natural deficiencies but all in vain" (quoted in Stoneman, 1987, from Cecil, p. 235). A scathing unsigned review of North and South in The Leader accused Gaskell of making errors about Lancashire which a resident of Manchester would not make and said that a woman (or clergymen and women) could not "understand industrial problems", would "know too little about the cotton industry" and had no "right to add to the confusion by writing about it".

Mrs. Gaskell's novels, with the exception of Cranford, slipped into obscurity during the late 19th century; before 1950, she was dismissed as a minor author with good judgement and "feminine" sensibilities. Archie Stanton Whitfield said her work was "like a nosegay of violets, honeysuckle, lavender, mignonette and sweet briar" in 1929. Cecil (1934) said that she lacked the "masculinity" necessary to properly deal with social problems (Chapman, 1999, pp. 39–40).

The critical tide began to turn in Mrs. Gaskell's favour when, in the 1950s and 1960s, socialist critics like Kathleen Tillotson, Arnold Kettle and Raymond Williams re-evaluated the description of social and industrial problems in her novels (see Moore, 1999 for an elaboration) and—realising that her vision went against the prevailing views of the time—saw it as preparing the way for vocal feminist movements. In the early 21st century, with Mrs. Gaskell's work "enlisted in contemporary negotiations of nationhood as well as gender and class identities", North and South – one of the first industrial novels describing the conflict between employers and workers – was recognized as depicting complex social conflicts and offering more satisfactory solutions through Margaret Hale: spokesperson for the author and Gaskell's most mature creation.

In her introduction to The Cambridge Companion to Elizabeth Gaskell (2007), a collection of essays representing modern Gaskell scholarship, Jill L. Matus stresses the author's growing stature in Victorian literary studies and how her innovative, versatile storytelling addressed the rapid changes during her life.

== Literary style and themes ==
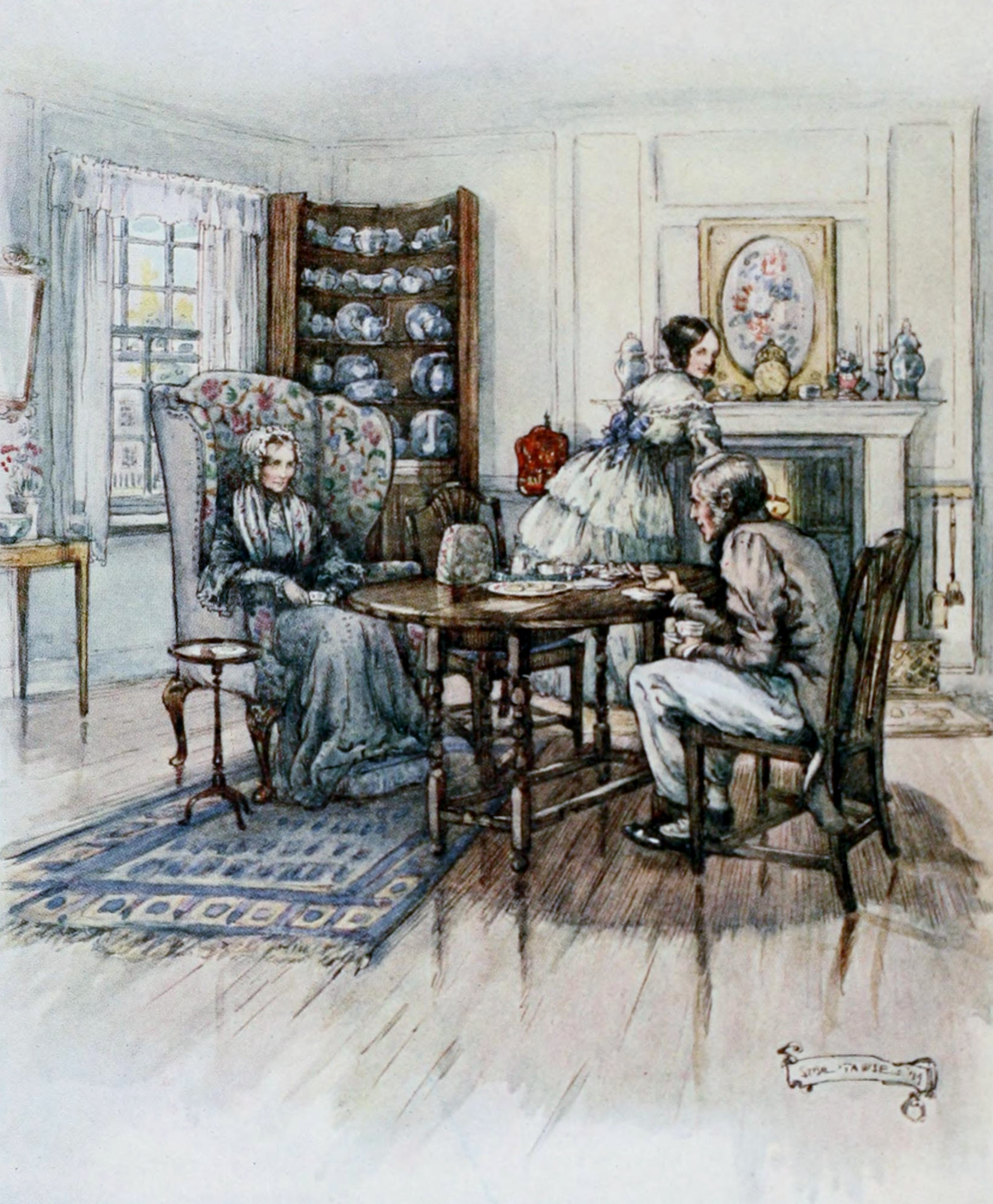
A scene from Cranford, illustrated by Sybil Tawse.

Gaskell's first novel, Mary Barton, was published anonymously in 1848. The best-known of her remaining novels are Cranford (1851–1853), North and South (1854–1855), and Wives and Daughters (1864–1866). She became popular for her writing, especially her ghost stories, aided by Charles Dickens, who published her work in his magazine Household Words. Her ghost stories are in the "Gothic" vein, making them quite distinct from her "industrial" fiction.

Even though her writing conforms to Victorian conventions, including the use of the name "Mrs. Gaskell", she usually framed her stories as critiques of contemporary attitudes. Her early works were highly influenced by the social analysis of Thomas Carlyle and focused on factory work in the Midlands. She usually emphasized the role of women, with complex narratives and realistic female characters. Gaskell was influenced by the writings of Jane Austen, especially in North and South, which borrows liberally from the courtship plot of Pride and Prejudice. She was an established novelist when Patrick Brontë invited her to write a biography of his daughter, though she worried, as a writer of fiction, that it would be "a difficult thing" to "be accurate and keep to the facts." Her treatment of class continues to interest social historians as well as fiction readers.

=== Themes ===
Unitarianism urges comprehension and tolerance toward all religions and even though Gaskell tried to keep her own beliefs hidden, she felt strongly about these values which permeated her works; in North and South, "Margaret the Churchwoman, her father the Dissenter, Higgins the Infidel, knelt down together. It did them no harm."

=== Dialect usage ===
Gaskell's style is notable for putting local dialect words into the mouths of middle-class characters and the narrator. In North and South Margaret Hale suggests redding up (tidying) the Bouchers' house and even offers jokingly to teach her mother words such as knobstick (strike-breaker). In 1854 she defended her use of dialect to express otherwise inexpressible concepts in a letter to Walter Savage Landor:

... you will remember the country people's use of the word "unked". I can't find any other word to express the exact feeling of strange unusual desolate discomfort, and I sometimes "potter" and "mither" people by using it.

She also used the dialect word "nesh" (a person who feels the cold easily or often feels cold is said to be 'nesh'), which goes back to Old English, in Mary Barton:

Sit you down here: the grass is well nigh dry by this time; and you're neither of you nesh folk about taking cold.

also in North and South:

And I did na like to be reckoned nesh and soft,

and later in "The Manchester Marriage" (1858):

Now, I'm not above being nesh for other folks myself. I can stand a good blow, and never change colour; but, set me in the operating-room in the Infirmary, and I turn as sick as a girl.

and:

At Mrs Wilson's death Norah came back to them, as a nurse to the newly-born little Edwin; into which post she was not installed without a pretty strong oration on the part of the proud and happy father; who declared that if he found out that Norah ever tried to screen the boy by falsehood, or to make him nesh either in body or mind, she should go that very day.

== Publications ==
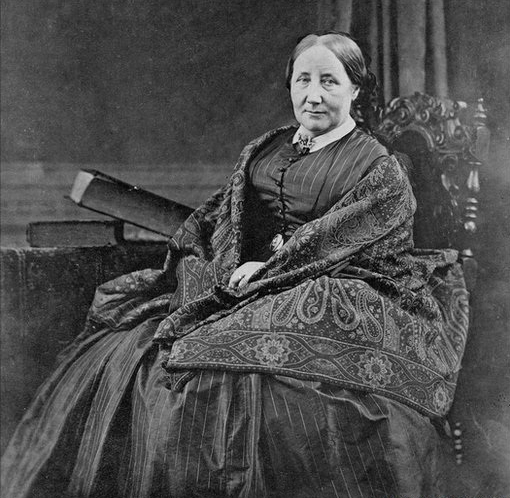
Elizabeth Gaskell, c. 1860

=== Novels ===
- Mary Barton (1848)
- Cranford (1851–1853)
- Ruth (1853)
- North and South (1854–1855)
- My Lady Ludlow (1858–1859)
- A Dark Night's Work (1863)
- Sylvia's Lovers (1863)
- Wives and Daughters: An Everyday Story (1864–1866)

=== Novellas and collections ===
- The Moorland Cottage (1850)
- Mr. Harrison's Confessions (1851)
- Lizzie Leigh; and Other Tales (1855)
- Round the Sofa (1859)
- Lois the Witch (1859; 1861)
- Cousin Phillis (1863–1864)
- The Grey Woman and Other Tales (1865)
- Cousin Phillis and Other Tales (1865)

=== Short stories ===
- "Libbie Marsh's Three Eras" (1847)
- "The Sexton's Hero" (1847)
- "Christmas Storms and Sunshine" (1848)
- "Hand and Heart" (1849)
- "Martha Preston" (1850)
- "The Well of Pen-Morfa" (1850)
- "The Heart of John Middleton" (1850)
- "Disappearances" (1851)
- "Bessy's Troubles at Home" (1852)
- "The Old Nurse's Story" (1852)
- "Cumberland Sheep-Shearers" (1853)
- "Morton Hall" (1853)
- "Traits and Stories of the Huguenots" (1853)
- "My French Master" (1853)
- "The Squire's Story" (1853)
- "Company Manners" (1854)
- "Half a Life-time Ago" (1855)
- "The Poor Clare" (1856)
- "The Doom of the Griffiths" (1858)
- "An Incident at Niagara Falls" (1858)
- "The Sin of a Father" (1858), later republished as "Right at Last"
- "The Manchester Marriage" (1858)
- "The Haunted House" (1859)
- "The Ghost in the Garden Room" (1859), later "The Crooked Branch"
- "The Half Brothers" (1859)
- "Curious If True" (1860)
- "The Grey Woman" (1861)
- "Six weeks at Heppenheim" (1862)
- "The Cage at Cranford" (1863)
- "How the First Floor Went to Crowley Castle" (1863), republished as "Crowley Castle"
- "A Parson's Holiday" (1865)

=== Non-fiction ===
- "Notes on Cheshire Customs" (1840)
- An Accursed Race (1855)
- The Life of Charlotte Brontë (1857)
- "French Life" (1864)
- "A Column of Gossip from Paris" (1865)

=== Poetry ===
- Sketches Among the Poor (with William Gaskell; 1837)
- Temperance Rhymes (1839)

== Media portrayal ==
Gaskell appears in the 1973 Yorkshire Television series The Brontës of Haworth, written by Christopher Fry, and her words are used to narrate the story. Gaskell is played by Barbara Leigh Hunt.

== Legacy ==
The house on Plymouth Grove remained in the Gaskell family until 1913, after which it stood empty and fell into disrepair. The University of Manchester acquired it in 1969 and in 2004 it was acquired by the Manchester Historic Buildings Trust, which then raised money to restore it. Exterior renovations were completed in 2011; it is now open to the public as a historic house museum. In 2010, a memorial to Gaskell was unveiled in Poets' Corner in Westminster Abbey. The panel was dedicated by her great-great-great-granddaughter Sarah Prince and a wreath was laid. Manchester City Council have created an award in Gaskell's name, given to recognize women's involvement in charitable work and improvement of lives. A bibliomemoir Mrs. Gaskell and me: Two Women, Two Love Stories, Two centuries Apart, by Nell Stevens was published in 2018.

The playwright Margaret Macnamara wrote a play based on the novel which was performed in 1949. An adaptation of her novel Wives and Daughters aired on BBC television in 1999. In 2004, a television film miniseries aired on BBC television of her 1854 novel North and South. In 2007, a five part serialisation of her novel Cranford starring Judi Dench aired on BBC television.

The Gaskell Memorial Hall, Silverdale's village hall, is so named because while funds were being raised for the building of the hall in 1928 a donor offered £50, or £100 if it was named thus: the conversation is recorded by novelist Willie Riley in his autobiography.

The rebuilt Cross Street Chapel in Manchester houses a collection of memorabilia of the writer in the Gaskell Room of the new building.

== See also ==
- Illegitimacy in fiction
- Elizabeth Carter
