= Sylvia's Lovers =

1863 novel by Elizabeth Gaskell

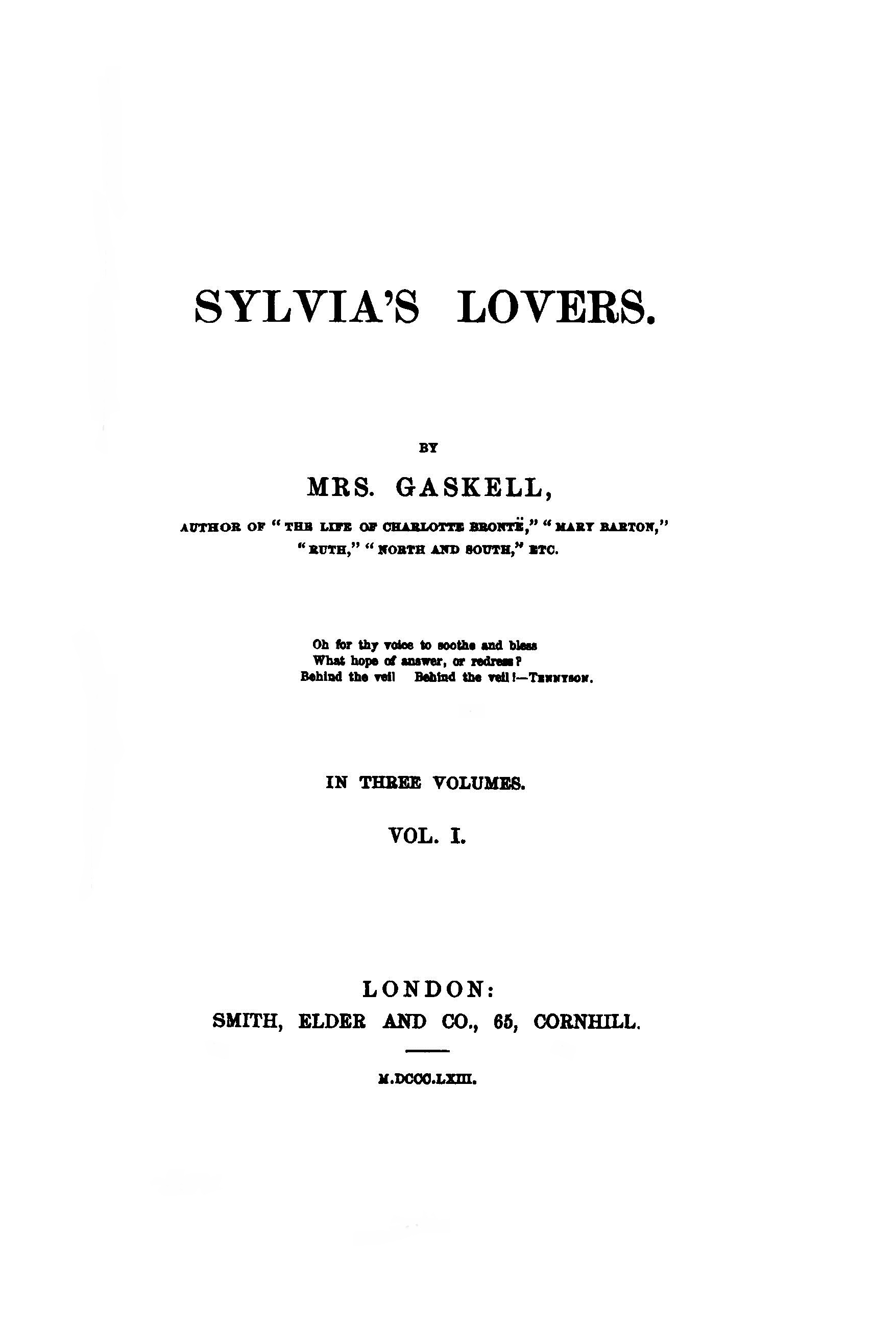
- Title page of the first edition, 1863
- Author: Elizabeth Gaskell
- Language: English
- Genre: Social novel, Historical novel
- Published: 1863
- Publisher: Smith, Elder & Co.
- Publication place: United Kingdom
- Media type: Print (hardback & paperback)

Sylvia's Lovers is an 1863 novel by English author Elizabeth Gaskell, which she called "the saddest story I ever wrote".

== Synopsis ==
The novel begins in the 1790s in the coastal town of Monkshaven (modeled on Whitby, England) against the background of the practice of impressment during the early phases of the French Revolution. 17-year-old Sylvia Robson lives happily with her parents on a farm, and is passionately loved by her rather dull Quaker cousin Philip Hepburn. She, however, meets and falls in love with Charlie Kinraid, a dashing sailor on a whaling vessel, and they become secretly engaged. When Charlie goes back to his ship, he is forcibly enlisted in the Royal Navy by a press gang, a scene witnessed by Philip. Philip does not tell Sylvia of the incident nor relay to her Charlie's parting message and, believing her lover is dead, Sylvia eventually marries her cousin. This act is primarily prompted out of gratefulness for Philip's assistance during a difficult time following her father's imprisonment and subsequent execution for leading a revengeful raid on press-gang collaborators. They have a daughter. Inevitably, Charlie returns to claim Sylvia and she discovers that Philip knew all the time that he was still alive. Philip leaves her in despair at her subsequent rage and rejection, but she refuses to live with Charlie because of her child.

Philip joins the army under a pseudonym, and ends up fighting in the Napoleonic wars, where he saves Charlie's life. Charlie returns to Britain, and marries. His wife, who knows nothing of their history together, informs Sylvia that her husband is a great military leader. Charlie's marriage suggests to Sylvia that he was not as faithful to her as she had remained to him, and she then realizes she is actually in love with Philip. Philip, meanwhile horribly disfigured by a shipboard explosion, returns to the small Northumbrian village to try to secretly get a glimpse of his child. He ends up staying with the sister of a servant of Sylvia's deceased parents, and rescues his child when she nearly drowns. He is fatally injured while saving his daughter, but his identity then becomes known and he is reconciled with his wife on his deathbed.

== Characters ==
- Sylvia Robson - the 17-year-old heroine
- Philip Hepburn - Sylvia's cousin (her mother’s nephew), works in a draper's shop
- Charlie Kinraid - a specksioneer or harpooner on a whaling ship
- Daniel Robson - Sylvia's father, a former whaler
- Bell Robson - Sylvia's mother
- Molly Corney - Sylvia's friend
- Hester Rose - also works in the draper's shop
- Alice Rose - Hester's mother

== Reception ==
The novel is one of Elizabeth Gaskell's least known works. John McVeagh has pointed to a "sudden lapse into melodrama" which "reduces and cheapens an interesting story". The novel does seem to show signs of hurry at the conclusion. For instance, detailed attention is given to Sylvia's growing infatuation with Charlie, but her eventual disillusionment with him following his hasty marriage at the end of the story is described in only a few sentences. As her obsessive love for him has ruled her life, it does seem surprising that this receives such a cursory treatment. TJW, in an article in the Modern Language Review, comments that 'Kinraid is eventually shown to be a shallow character, but Mrs Gaskell's portrayal of him is so superficial that we find it hard to appreciate the strength of Sylvia Robson's love for him'. However, it has also received praise and been compared positively with the writings of George Eliot, particularly Adam Bede.
