= Sybil Tawse =

- Born: Sybil Tawse; 26 September 1886; Bishopwearmouth (Sunderland), County Durham, England
- Died: 6 February 1971 (aged 84); Portsmouth, Hampshire, England
- Occupations: Painter and illustrator
- Writing career
- Period: 1910–1940

Sybil Tawse (26 September 1886 – 6 February 1971), English artist and illustrator.

== Life ==
Sybil Tawse was born on 26 September 1886, the fifth child of George Tawse and Elizabeth Ann [Harrison] Tawse. The family lived in Bishopwearmouth (now part of Sunderland) in County Durham (now Tyne and Wear). She went to London to study at Lambeth School of Art and The Royal School of Art, where she was a King's Prize Scholar and a Silver and Bronze Medallist, exhibiting at the Royal Academy and at the Brighton Museum & Art Gallery. In London she lived on Gloucester Road, South Kensington, with her sisters Catherine and Gladys, a jeweler, then with Gladys in Cheyne Walk, Chelsea, building a steady career illustrating books, designing posters, and portrait painting. Tawse never married, dying in Portsmouth on 6 February 1971 at the age of 84.

== Work ==
Sybil Tawse contributed illustrations to a number of books, as follows:

- Our Own Story Book, Nister 1908, 2 colour plates
- Nister's Holiday Annual [1909] edited by Alfred C. Playne, Nister 1909, illustration
- The Essays of Elia by Charles Lamb, Chapman & Hall 1910, 24 colour plates
- Aunt Judith: The Story of a Loving Life by Grace Beaumont, Nelson 1910, 4 colour plates
- Dulcie's Love Story by Evelyn Everett Green, Nelson 1910, 4 colour plates
- Funny Folks, Nelson 1910, 4 colour plates
- Tales After Tea, Nelson 1912, colour frontis
- Stories for All Times, Nister 1913, endpaper illustrations
- The Fairchild Family by Mrs [Mary Martha] Sherwood, A & C Black 1913, 8 colour plates
- Cranford by Mrs. Gaskell, A & C Black 1914, 8 colour plates
- Tales from the Poets arranged by W.J. Glover, A & C Black 1915, 12 colour plates
- The Heroes or Greek Fairy Tales for my Children by Charles Kingsley, A & C Black 1915, 8 colour plates
- The Ideal Home by Matilda Lees-Dods, The Waverley Book Company 1916, 36 colour plates
- Stories of Gods and Heroes by Thomas Bulfinch, Thomas Crowell ca 1919, 8 colour plates
- The Count Of Monte Cristo by Alexandre Dumas, A & C Black 1920, 8 colour plates
- Mr. Midshipman Easy by Captain Fredrich Marryat, A & C Black 1921, 8 colour plates
- That Boarding School Girl by Dorita Fairlie Bruce, Oxford UP 1925, wrap-around colour cover
- Miss Esperance and Mr Wycherly by L. Allen Harker, John Murray 1926, colour frontis and 44 illustrations
- Catriona by R.L. Stevenson, Nelson 1926, colour frontis
- Xmas shopping, Sybil Tawse poster for the London Underground 1927
- In The Swiss Mountains by Johanna Spyri, Thomas Crowell 1929, 8 colour plates
- Silas Marner by George Eliot, Nelson 1929, 8 illustrations
- John Halifax Gentleman by Mrs [Dinah] Craik, Oxford UP 1930, colour frontis and 4 illustrations
- Our Child's Red Letter Days by Marion Allbutt, Harrap 1931, 4 colour plates
- Mother Goose, Harrap 1932, dustwrapper illustration, 12 colour plates, and about 200 illustrations
- Anne of Green Gables by L.M. Montgomery, L.C. Page 1933, 8 colour plates
- The Goodieman's Whistle by Agnes Grozier Herbertson, Oxford UP 1935, 7 illustrations
- Pollyanna by Eleanor H. Porter, Harrap 1938, 8 colour plates
- Glen Robin by F.J.E. Bennett, Nelson 1941, colour frontis and 16 illustrations
- Read Me a Story compiled by Frank Waters, Harrap 1974, 7 illustrations from Mother Goose (1932)
- Playtime Reading with Mother compiled by Frank Waters, Harrap 1979, 10 illustrations from Mother Goose (1932)

Books undated by the publisher use the year of publication shown in the British Library catalogue.
