= Mary Barton =

1848 novel by Elizabeth Gaskell

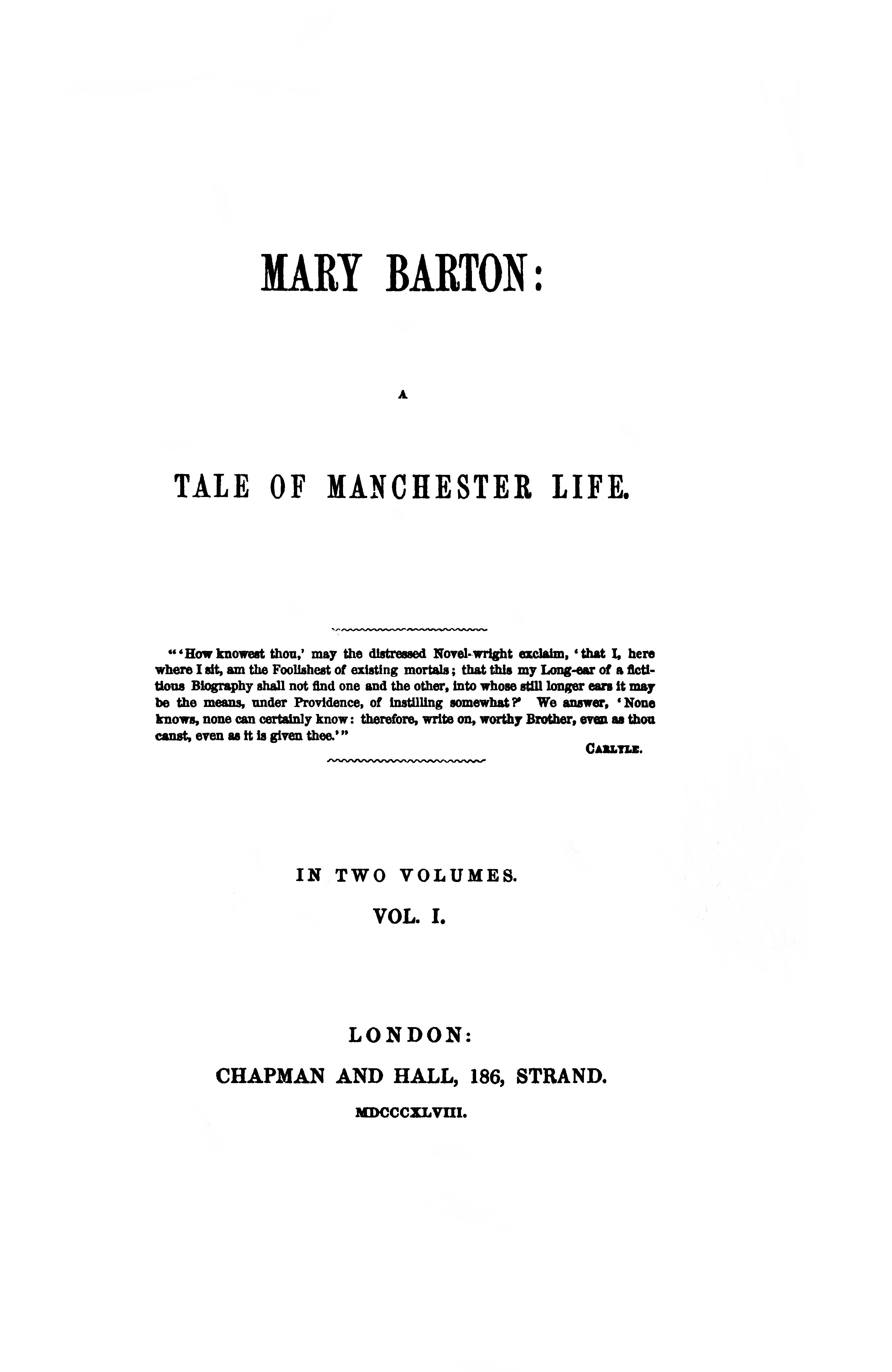
- Title page of the first edition, 1848
- Author: Elizabeth Gaskell
- Language: English
- Genre: Romance novel
- Published: 18 October 1848
- Publisher: Chapman & Hall
- Publication place: United Kingdom
- Followed by: Cranford

Mary Barton: A Tale of Manchester Life was the first novel by English author Elizabeth Gaskell, first published in 1848. The story is set in the English city of Manchester between 1839 and 1842, and deals with the difficulties faced by the Victorian working class.

== Plot summary ==
The novel begins in Manchester, where we are introduced to the Bartons and the Wilsons, two working-class families. John Barton is a questioner of the distribution of wealth and the relations between rich and poor. Soon his wife dies—he blames it on her grief over the disappearance of her sister Esther. Having already lost his son Tom at a young age, Barton is left to raise his daughter, Mary, alone and now falls into depression and begins to involve himself in the Chartist, trade-union movement.

Chapter 1 takes place in the countryside where Greenheys is now.

Mary takes up work at a dressmaker's (her father had objected to her working in a factory) and becomes subject to the affections of hard-working Jem Wilson and Harry Carson, son of a wealthy mill owner. She fondly hopes, by marrying Carson, to secure a comfortable life for herself and her father, but immediately after refusing Jem's offer of marriage she realizes that she truly loves him. She, therefore, decides to evade Carson, planning to show her feelings to Jem in the course of time. Jem believes her decision to be final, though this does not change his feelings for her.

Meanwhile, Esther, a "street-walker," returns to warn John Barton that he must save Mary from becoming like her. He simply pushes her away, however, and she's sent to jail for a month on the charge of vagrancy. Upon her release, she talks to Jem with the same purpose. He promises that he will protect Mary and confronts Carson, eventually entering into a fight with him, which is witnessed by a policeman passing by.

Not long afterward, Carson is shot dead, and Jem is arrested for the crime, his gun having been found at the scene. Esther decides to investigate the matter further and discovers that the wadding for the gun was a piece of paper on which is written Mary's name.

She visits her niece to warn her to save the one she loves, and after she leaves Mary realizes that the murderer is not Jem but her father. She is now faced with having to save her lover without giving away her father. With the help of Job Legh (the intelligent grandfather of her blind friend Margaret), Mary travels to Liverpool to find the only person who could provide an alibi for Jem – Will Wilson, Jem's cousin and a sailor, who was with him on the night of the murder. Unfortunately, Will's ship is already departing, so that, after Mary chases after the ship in a small boat, the only thing Will can do is promise to return in the pilot ship and testify the next day.

During the trial, Jem learns of Mary's great love for him. Will arrives in court to testify, and Jem is found "not guilty". Mary has fallen ill during the trial and is nursed by Mr. Sturgis, an old sailor, and his wife. When she finally returns to Manchester she has to face her father, who is crushed by his remorse. He summons John Carson, Harry's father, to confess to him that he is the murderer. Carson is still set on justice, but after turning to the Bible he forgives Barton, who dies soon afterward in Carson's arms. Not long after this Esther comes back to Mary's home, where she, too, soon dies.

Jem decides to leave England, where, his reputation damaged, it would be difficult for him to find a new job. The novel ends with the wedded Mary and Jem, their little child, and Mrs. Wilson living happily in Canada. The news comes that Margaret has regained her sight and that she and Will, soon to be married, will visit.

== Characters ==
- Mary Barton – The eponymous character, a very beautiful girl.
- Mrs. Mary Barton – Mary's mother, who dies early on.
- John Barton – Mary's father, a millworker, an active member in trade unions.
- George Wilson – John Barton's best friend, a worker at John Carson's mill.
- Jane Wilson – George Wilson's wife, short-tempered.
- Jem Wilson – Son of George and Jane, an engineer and inventor who has loved Mary from his childhood.
- John Carson – Wealthy owner of a mill in Manchester.
- Harry Carson – Son of John Carson, attracted to Mary.
- Alice Wilson – George Wilson's sister, a pious old washerwoman, herbalist, sick-nurse.
- Margaret Jennings – Neighbour of Alice, blind, a sometime singer, a friend to Mary.
- Job Legh – Margaret's grandfather, a self-taught naturalist.
- Ben Sturgis – An old sailor, who looks after Mary during her stay in Liverpool.
- Will Wilson – Alice's nephew (Jem's cousin), whom she raised after the death of his parents. A sailor, he falls in love with Margaret.
- Esther (gives her name as Mrs. Fergusson of 145, Nicholas Street, Angel's Meadow) – Sister of Mrs. Mary Barton, she is a fallen woman; her function is to pose an awful 'what if' concerning young Mary's fate.

== Background and composition ==
In beginning to write novels, it was Gaskell's hope that they would provide some solace from the pain of the loss of her son Willie. The idea, according to her early biographer Ellis Chadwick, was first suggested by her husband William Gaskell to "soothe her sorrow". In an 1849 letter to her friend Mrs. Greg, Gaskell said that she, "took refuge in the invention to exclude the memory of painful scenes which would force themselves upon my remembrance."

However, it is clear from her preface that the suffering she saw around her was the motivational factor for the content of the novel: "I had always felt a deep sympathy with the care-worn men, who looked as if doomed to struggle through their lives in strange alternations between work and want[...] The more I reflected on this unhappy state of things between those so bound to each other by common interests, as the employers and the employed must ever be, the more anxious I became to give some utterance to the agony which from time to time convulsed this dumb person."

Gaskell's desire to accurately represent the poverty of industrial Manchester is evident in a record of a visit she made to the home of a local labourer. On comforting the family, Hompes records, the "head of the family took hold of her arm and grasping it tightly, said, with tears in his eyes: 'Aye, ma'am, but have ye ever seen a child clemmed to death?'" This question is almost precisely repeated in the mouth of John Barton: "Han they ever have seen a child o' their'n die for want o' food?" in chapter 4.

As well as relying on her own experience, Gaskell is thought to have used secondary sources on which to base the setting of the story, including Kay's The moral and physical condition of the working classes involved in the cotton manufacture in Manchester (1832) and Peter Gaskell's The manufacturing population of England (1833). Other details to which Gaskell paid particular attention to ensure the realism of the novel include the topography of both Manchester and Liverpool (including the rural environment detailed in the first chapter, and references to road names and prominent buildings), the superstitions and customs of the local people and the dialect. In the earliest editions, William Gaskell added the footnotes explaining some of the words specific to the Lancashire dialect, and after the fifth edition (1854), two lectures of his on the subject were added as appendices. It is widely thought that the murder of Harry Carson in the novel was inspired by the assassination of Thomas Ashton, a Manchester mill-owner, in 1831.

Mary Barton was first published as two volumes in October 1848. (Note: Sanders has the date as 14th, Seccombe as 18th, but Hopkins says the Athenaeum's reference to "Wednesday next" (i.e. 15th) accords more closely with Chapman's letter to Gaskell at the time. See Hopkins, Annette B. (June 1948). "Mary Barton: A Victorian Best Seller". The Trollopian. 3 (1): 1–18. doi:10.2307/3044539. JSTOR 3044539.) Gaskell was paid £100 for the novel. The publisher Edward Chapman had had the manuscript since the middle of 1847. He had several recorded influences on the novel, the most prominent of which is probably the change in title: the novel was originally entitled John Barton. Gaskell said that he was, "the central figure to my mind...he was my 'hero'." He also encouraged Gaskell to include chapters 36 and 37, the dialectical glosses added by William Gaskell, a preface and the chapter epigraphs.

The second edition, with Gaskell's corrections, particularly on typographical mistakes when writing the Lancashire dialect, appeared on 3 January 1849. The third edition soon followed, in February. A fourth, without Gaskell's involvement, appeared in October 1850. The fifth edition, from 1854, was the first single volume edition and included William Gaskell's lectures on the dialect. Mary Barton uses the word "wench" a total of 42 times.

== Analysis ==
=== Genre ===
One element of the novel that has been a subject of heavy criticism is the apparent shift in genres between the political focus of the early chapters to the domestic in the later ones. Raymond Williams particularly saw this as a failure by the author: the early chapters, he said, are the "most moving response in the literature to the industrial suffering of the 1840s", but in the later, the novel becomes a "familiar and orthodox...Victorian novel of sentiment". Williams suggested that this shift may have been at the influence of her publishers, an idea supported by the title change, which changes the main focus of the reader from the political upheaval John is trying to promote to Mary's emotional journey.

However, Kamilla Elliot disagrees with Williams about the weakness of the domestic genre, saying, "It is the romance plot, not the political plot, that contains the more radical political critique in the novel."

=== Style ===
It is a subject of some debate whether the first person narrator in Mary Barton is synonymous with Gaskell. On the one hand, the consistent use of tone through the original preface and the novel, and authorial insets like the first paragraph of chapter 5 suggest the Gaskell is directly narrating the story. Contrarily, critics like Lansbury suggest the narrator is too unsympathetic in all Gaskell's Manchester novels to be her own voice:

Nothing could be more unwise than to regard the authorial 'I' of the novels as the voice of Elizabeth Gaskell, particularly in the Manchester novels. The narrator has a tendency to engage in false pleading and specious argument, while the workers demonstrate honesty and commonsense.

Hopkins goes so far as to claim that the detail to verisimilitude in the novel made it the first "respectable" social novel, in contrast with the lack of believability in, for example, Disraeli's Sybil or Tonna's Helen Fleetwood.

Prominent in the novel is Gaskell's attempt to reinforce the realism of her representation through the inclusion of "working-class discourses", not only through the use of closely imitated colloquialisms and dialect, but also through "passages from Chartist poems, working class ballads, proverbs, maxims, and nursery rhymes, as John Barton's radical discourse, Ben Davenport's deathbed curses, and Job Legh's language of Christian submission."

=== Themes ===
Kathleen Mary Tillotson wrote that Mary Barton is "built on the assumptions of Chartism and Past and Present", two works of social criticism by Thomas Carlyle.

The first half of the novel focuses mainly on the comparison between the rich and poor. In a series of set pieces across the opening chapters, we are shown the lifestyles of the Bartons, Wilsons (most prominently in the chapter "A Manchester Tea-Party") and Davenport's respective households compared to the contrasting affluence of the Carson establishment (in the chapter "Poverty and Death"). A key symbol shown in this chapter is the use of five shillings; this amount being the price John Barton receives for pawning most of his possessions, but also the loose change in Harry Carson's pocket.

Gaskell details the importance of the mother in a family; as is seen from the visible decline in John Barton's physical and moral well-being after his wife's death. This view is also symbolized by Job Legh's inability to care for Margaret as a baby in the chapter "Barton's London Experience". The theme of motherhood is connected to declining masculinity: Surridge points out that the roles of nurturing fall towards the men as bread-winning falls away. Both Wilson and Barton are pictured holding the infants in the place of the nanny that can't be afforded as the novel begins, but eventually, both end up relying on the income of their children, Jem and Mary respectively.

The second half of the book deals mainly with the murder plot. Here it can be seen that redemption is also a key aspect of the novel; not least because of the eventual outcome of the relationship between Messrs Carson and Barton, but also in Gaskell's presentation of Esther, the typical "fallen woman". The selfless nature she gives the character, on several occasions having her confess her faults with brutal honesty, is an attempt to make the reader sympathize with the character of a prostitute, unusual for the time.

Indeed, throughout the novel Gaskell appears to refer to her characters as being out of her control, acting as not so much a narrator but a guide for the observing reader. Another aspect of the passivity of the characters is, as some suggest, that they represent the impotence of the class to defend or even represent, themselves politically. Cooney draws attention to this in the scene in which the factory is on fire – a scene the reader anticipates to be domestic fails in its domestic role (one might imagine Jem's heroism to prompt Mary to discover her true feelings) actually sees the crowd passively at the mercy of ill-equipped firemen and unconcerned masters.

Several times Gaskell attempts to mask her strong beliefs in the novel by disclaiming her knowledge of such matters as economics and politics, but the powerful language she gives to her characters, especially John Barton in the opening chapter, is a clear indication of the author's interest in the class divide. She openly pleads for reducing this divide through increased communication and, as a consequence, understanding between employers and workmen and generally through a more human behaviour based on Christian principles, at the same time presenting her own fears of how the poor will eventually act in retaliation to their oppression.

Gaskell also describes an Italian torture chamber where the victim is afforded many luxuries at first but in the end, the walls of the cell start closing in and finally they crush him. It is believed that the story has been influenced by William Mudford's short story "The Iron Shroud". Stephen Derry mentions that Gaskell uses the concept of the shrinking cell to describe John Barton's state of mind but also added the element of luxury to further enhance it.

Death plays a significant and unavoidable role in the plot: it has been interpreted both as mere realism (Lucas points out the average mortality rate at the time was 17) and autobiographically as the cathartic relief of grief over her son's premature death. The image of a dying child was also a trope of Chartist discourse.

== Reception ==
The novel was first published anonymously, but its authorship was widely known within a year.

Early reception of the novel was divided, with some praising its honesty and fidelity to facts and others criticising it for presenting a distorted picture of the employer-employee relationships. The British Quarterly Review said it was a "one-sided picture", and the Edinburgh Review that the division between employers and employed was exaggerated. They were echoed by the Manchester Guardian and the Prospective Review, however the Athenaeum, the Eclectic Review, the Christian Examiner and Fraser's Magazine took a different stance. The Athenaeum's otherwise positive review raised the question of whether "it may be kind or wise or right to make fiction the vehicle for a plain, matter of fact exposition of social evils".

Thomas Carlyle wrote a letter to Gaskell in which he called it "a Book seeming to take its place far above the ordinary garbage of Novels".

Part of the sensation the novel created was due to the anonymity with which it was published. Gaskell claimed that on occasion she had even joined in with discussions making guesses at the authorship.

== Adaptations ==
There have been a few stage adaptations (mostly loosely so and mostly in the 19th century) and one adaptation in each of radio and television. There have been no films, although one of the stage adaptations has been filmed a number of times.

=== Radio ===
In 2001, the BBC broadcast a 20-episode serialisation of Mary Barton.

=== Television ===
The BBC broadcast a four-episode series in 1964. All four episodes ('Fire', 'Violence', 'Murder', and 'Trial'), are believed lost, although it has been hypothesised that copies may still exist in BBC Archives. Directed by Michael Imison, it featured Lois Daine (Mary Barton), George A. Cooper (John Barton), Barry Warren (Jem Wilson), Gwendolyn Watts (Margaret Legh), Brian Peck (Will Wilson) and Patrick Mower (Harry Carson).

In 2012, there were reports that the screenwriter Heidi Thomas (who wrote the script for the BBC serialisation of Cranford) was working on a TV adaption of Mary Barton for the BBC, but nothing seems to have come of this.

=== Theatre ===
The first adaptation occurred soon after publication, by the playwright John Courtney at The Old Vic, then called the Victoria Theatre, in 1851. While the novel targeted middle and upper class readers, Courtney's production engaged a specifically working-class audience – according to the playbill, it was 'written expressly for this Theatre', meaning the local working class community.

In the years following, there were then a number of stage productions, based more or less loosely on the plot and themes of the novel: Colin Hazlewood, Our Lot in Life, 1862; Dion Boucicault, The Long Strike, 1866 (at the Lyceum, in which the political plot was removed and which also incorporated elements of Lizzie Leigh); J P Weston, The Lancashire Strike, 1867; George Sims, The Last Chance, 1885; and, best-known, Stanley Houghton, Hindle Wakes, 1912, of which there have been four film versions.

In 2016 Rona Munro wrote a 2-act version, which premiered at the Royal Exchange, Manchester. It was directed by Sarah Frankcom and designed by Liz Ascroft, and featured Kellie Bright in the lead role.

== See also ==
- North and South, one of Gaskell's later novels with a similar theme
