= Ruth (novel) =

1853 novel by Elizabeth Gaskell

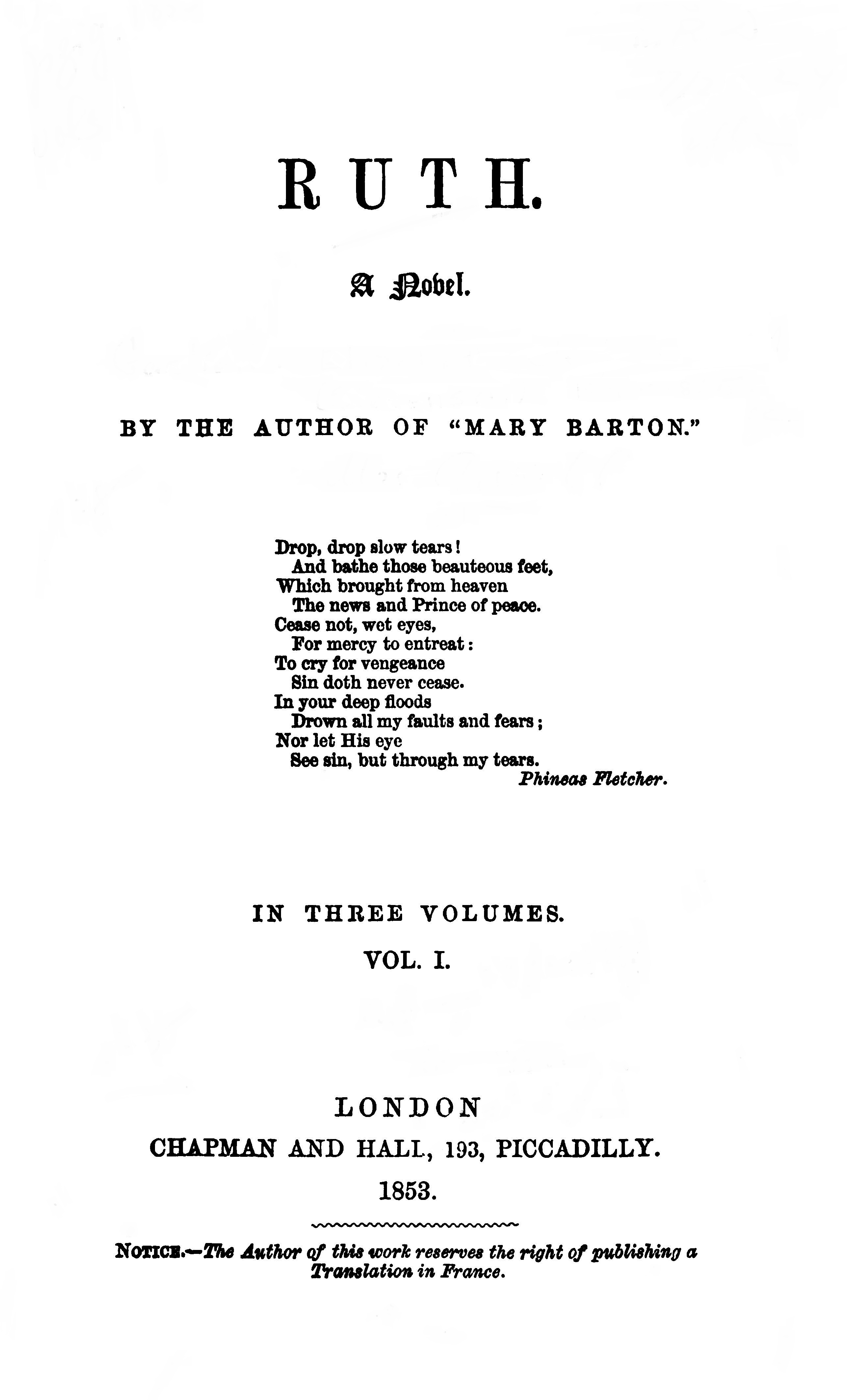
- Title page of the first edition, 1853
- Author: Elizabeth Gaskell
- Language: English
- Genre: Social novel
- Published: 1853
- Publisher: Chapman and Hall
- Publication place: United Kingdom
- Media type: Print (hardback & paperback)

Ruth is a novel by English author Elizabeth Gaskell, first published in three volumes in 1853.

== Synopsis ==
Ruth Hilton is a 15 year-old orphan girl working in a respectable sweatshop for the overworked Mrs Mason. She is selected to go to a ball to repair torn dresses. At the ball she meets the aristocratic 23 year-old Henry Bellingham, a rake figure who is instantly attracted to her. They meet again by chance and form a secret friendship; on an outing together they are spotted by Mrs Mason who, fearing for her shop's reputation, dismisses Ruth.

Alone in the world, Ruth is whisked away by Bellingham to London where it is implied she becomes a fallen woman. They go on holiday to Wales together and there on a country walk Ruth meets the disabled and kind Mr Thurstan Benson. Bellingham falls sick with fever and the hotel calls for his mother who arrives and is disgusted by her son's having lived in sin with Ruth. Bellingham is persuaded by his mother to abandon Ruth in Wales, leaving her some money.

A distraught Ruth attempts suicide but is spotted by Mr Benson who helps comfort her. When he learns of her past and that she is alone he brings her back to his home town, where he is a Dissenting minister, to stay with him and his formidable but kind sister Faith. When they learn that Ruth is pregnant they decide to lie to the town and claim that she is a widow called Mrs Denbigh, to protect her from a society which would otherwise shun her.

Ruth has her baby, whom she names Leonard. She is transformed into a Madonna type figure, calm and innocent once more. The rich local businessman Mr Bradshaw admires Ruth and employs her as a governess for his children, including his eldest daughter Jemima who is in awe of the beautiful Ruth.

Ruth goes away with the Bradshaws to a seaside house while one of Mr Bradshaw's children is convalescing from a long illness. Mr Bradshaw brings Mr Donne, a man whom he is sponsoring to become their local MP, to the seaside to impress him. Ruth recognises Mr Donne as actually being Mr Bellingham and the two have a confrontation on the beach. Bellingham offers to marry Ruth as he claims he still loves her and for the sake of their child, Ruth rejects him saying she will not let Leonard come in contact with a man like him.

From local gossip Jemima discovers about Ruth's past, though she is still unaware that it was Mr Donne who is Leonard's father. Jemima is headstrong and already jealous that her suitor Mr Farquhar, her father's business partner, seems to admire Ruth over her. The truth is Mr Farquhar is put off by Jemima's erratic behaviour, caused by her father's good intentioned interference. Jemima however decides to keep quiet over Ruth's past as she wrestles between her jealousy and her admiring love for Ruth.

Mr Bradshaw discovers also from local gossip however that Ruth is a fallen woman and despite Jemima's passionate defence of Ruth she is thrown out of the house and sacked. Ruth goes home and has to reveal to Leonard that he is in fact illegitimate; he is devastated and ashamed by the news. Mr Bradshaw also goes to his old friend Mr Benson and argues with him as he allowed the lie to be told and for Ruth to enter not only his but also Mr Bradshaw's house.

Jemima and Mr Farquhar marry and have their own child and form a good friendship with Ruth and Leonard but they are still on the outskirts of society. Ruth goes among the poor to work as a nurse to the sick and gains a good reputation there, making Leonard proud of his mother once more and restoring their relationship. Mr Bradshaw's son is found to have been embezzling the company's funds and his father disowns him. However, when his son is later involved in an accident, Mr Bradshaw is distraught and realises that his morals had been perhaps too heavy-handed in the past. His son recovers and Mr Bradshaw starts to rethink his life.

When there is a typhus outbreak, Ruth nurses the sick devotedly, earning the admiration of all. A local doctor offers to sponsor Leonard's studies at a good school and the Farquhars offer to go away on holiday with Ruth and Leonard. However, before Ruth has made a decision she hears that Mr Donne is very sick; she confides in the doctor the truth about who Mr Donne really is, and goes to him. He is delirious with fever and does not recognise her but she nurses him back to health.

Ruth however falls sick and dies from the illness. At the funeral many of the poor that Ruth had looked after praise her, and the chapel is full of people that loved Ruth, despite her being a fallen woman. Mr Donne comes to Mr Benson's house and sees Ruth dead. He offers money to Mr Benson for Leonard, acknowledging he is Leonard's father. Mr Benson declines his help, and throws him out of the house.

The novel ends with Mr Bradshaw finding a weeping Leonard at his mother's grave, whom he leads home to Mr Benson, thus completing the restoration of his friendship with Mr Benson. Bradshaw realises that as a member of the society that ostracised Ruth, he is also responsible for her death.

== Theme ==
The book is a social novel, dealing with Victorian views about sin and illegitimacy. It is a surprisingly compassionate portrayal of a 'fallen woman', a type of person normally outcast from respectable society. It examines the social stigma of illegitimacy. Ruth goes on to gain a respectable position in society as a governess and nurse, and the novel looks at whether the sinful can be reintegrated into society. The Christian religion plays a major role in the novel, and Ruth is required to earn her redemption through penitence and penance.

== Characters ==
- Ruth Hilton – The titular 15-year-old heroine. Later referred to as Mrs Denbigh.
- Henry Bellingham – Ruth's lover. He is 23 years old. He changes his name to Mr Donne.
- Leonard Denbigh – Ruth's illegitimate son.
- Mr Thurstan Benson – Minister who takes in Ruth.
- Miss Faith Benson – Sister of Mr Benson.
- Mr Richard Bradshaw – Ruth's employer. Local businessman.
- Jemima Bradshaw – Friend of Ruth's. Daughter of Mr Bradshaw.
- Mr William Farquhar – Business partner of Mr Bradshaw. Later Jemima's husband.

== Literary significance and reception ==
Ruth received a mixed critical reception. As a work that dealt frankly with seduction and illegitimacy, it inevitably attracted controversy: Gaskell reported that it was a "prohibited book" in her own household, that friends expressed "deep regret" at its publication, and that two acquaintances burnt their copies. On the other hand, some reviewers complained that Gaskell painted Ruth as too passive a victim of Bellingham's advances, eluding the question of Ruth's own sexual feelings. Gaskell loaded the story down with so many extenuating circumstances that Ruth scarcely seemed a representative example of a "fallen woman."

Ruth is one of several 19th-century British and American novels that cast a "fallen woman" with an illegitimate child in the role of heroine. It may be compared to Nathaniel Hawthorne's novel The Scarlet Letter (1850), published just a few years earlier, and in many respects it anticipates Thomas Hardy's novel Tess of the d'Urbervilles (1891). Ruth, like Tess, is a working-class girl who is distinguished from her peers by both unusual sensitivity and sexual ignorance. But Gaskell's treatment of her heroine differs somewhat from Hardy's in that she emphasises Ruth's guilt, regret, and struggle to expiate her sin, while Hardy is less inclined to view Tess as a sinner.

== See also ==
- Illegitimacy in fiction
