= Cargill (surname) =

Cargill is a surname of Scottish origin, a sept of Clan Drummond.

Notable people with the surname include:

== People ==
- Ann Cargill, an 18th-century British opera diva
- Ansley Cargill, an American tennis player
- Baily Cargill (born 1995), British football (soccer) player
- C. Robert Cargill, an American novelist and screenwriter
- Donald Cargill, a Scottish Covenanter
- Edward Cargill, 19th century New Zealand politician
- Helen Cargill Thompson, Scottish scientist, librarian, art collector and supporter of educational, artistic and heritage organisations
- Henry Cargill, an Ontario farmer, merchant and political figure
- Henson Cargill (1941–2007), American country music singer
- Honor Cargill-Martin (born 1998), English classicist and author
- Jade Cargill (born 1992), American professional wrestler
- James Cargill (musician) bassist for Broadcast
- James R. Cargill (1923–2006) U.S. businessman
- James R. Cargill II (born 1949) U.S. businessman
- Jimmy Cargill (1914–1939), Scottish football (soccer) player
- Sir John Cargill, 1st Baronet (1867–1954), Chairman of Burmah Oil Company
- John Cargill (politician), 19th century New Zealand politician
- John Cargill Thompson, Scottish dramatist specialising in one-person plays
- Karen Cargill, a Scottish operatic mezzo-soprano singer
- Lance Cargill, an American lawyer and Republican politician
- Margaret Anne Cargill, billionaire philanthropist
- Morris Cargill, a white Jamaican lawyer, businessman, planter, journalist and novelist
- Oscar Cargill (1898–1972), American literary critic and professor of English
- O. A. Cargill, a lawyer, author and buffalo rancher
- Patrick Cargill (1918–1996), a British actor
- Peter Cargill, a Jamaican international football player
- Wellington David Cargill, an Ontario manufacturer and political figure
- William Cargill (Berwick MP) (1813–1894), British Conservative Party politician, MP for Berwick-upon-Tweed 1863–65
- William Cargill (New Zealand politician), founder of the Otago settlement in New Zealand
- William Wallace Cargill (1844–1909), founder of Cargill company in the U.S.

== Fictional characters ==
- Colonel Cargill, a fictional character in Joseph Heller's classic novel Catch-22
- Callie Cargill, a fictional character from the TV show The Glades
- Joanna Cargill, a fictional Marvel Comics character
- Russ Cargill, fictional character, U.S. Environmental Protection Agency Head, and antagonist in The Simpsons Movie. Voiced by Albert Brooks.

== Other ==
- Cargill family; a U.S. business family
- Cargill baronets; of Great Britain

== See also ==
- Cargill (disambiguation)
- John Cargill Thompson (1938–2000), Scottish dramatist
- Cargill Gilston Knott, a pioneer in seismological research
