= John Cargill =

John Cargill may refer to:

- John Cargill (politician) (1821–1898), New Zealand politician
- Sir John Cargill, 1st Baronet (1867–1954), British chairman of the Burmah Oil Company, 1904–1943

== See also ==
- Cargill (surname)
