= North and South (Gaskell novel) =

1855 novel by Elizabeth Gaskell

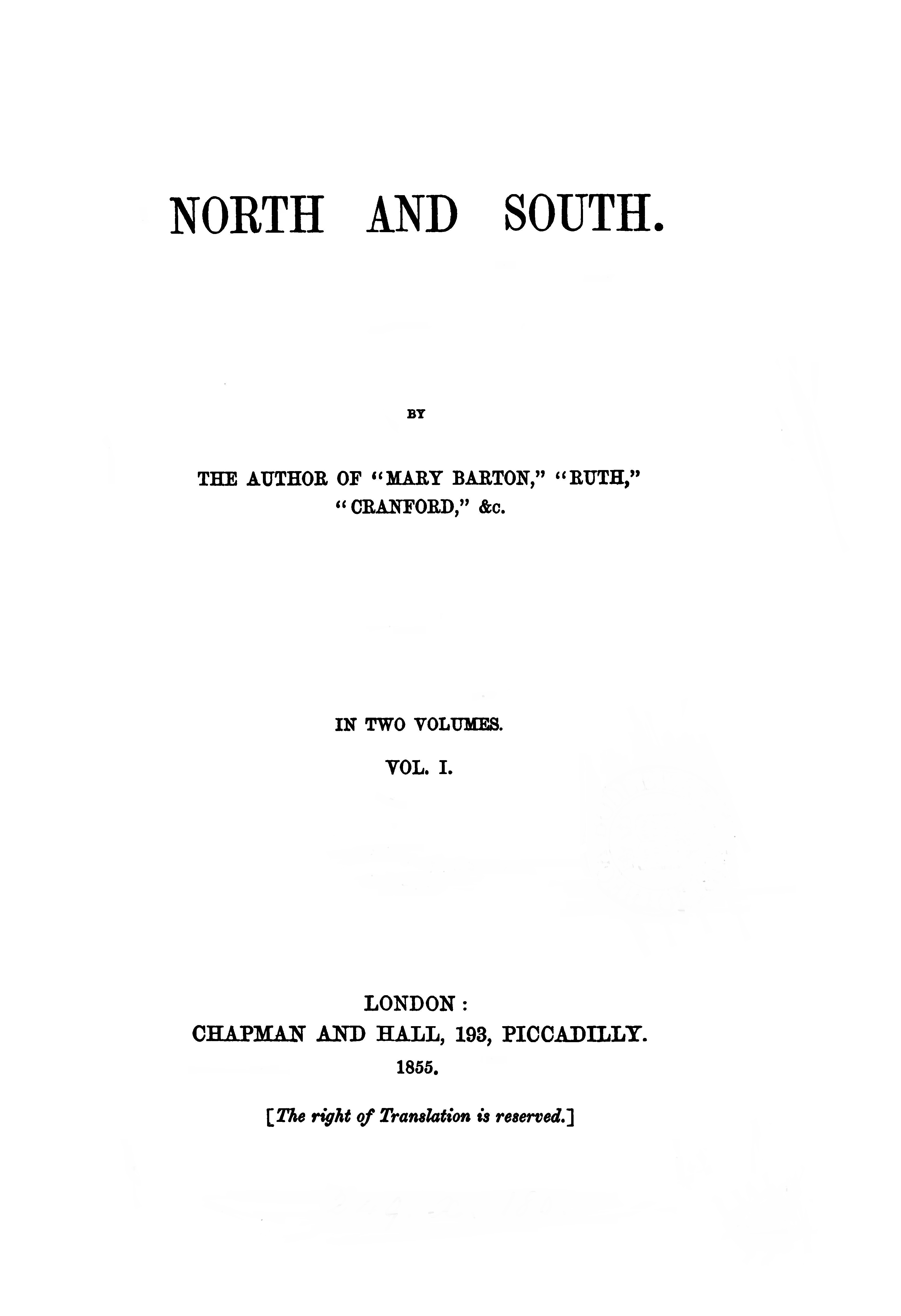
- Title page of the first edition, 1854–1855
- Author: Elizabeth Gaskell
- Working title: Margaret Hale
- Language: English
- Genre: Social novel
- Published: 1854–1855
- Publisher: Chapman & Hall
- Publication place: United Kingdom
- Media type: Print
- Preceded by: Cranford
- Followed by: Wives and Daughters
- Text: North and South at Wikisource

North and South is a social novel published in 1855 by English author Elizabeth Gaskell. With Wives and Daughters (1866) and Cranford (1853), it is one of her best-known novels and was adapted for television three times (1966, 1975 and 2004). At first, Gaskell wanted the novel to be titled after the heroine, Margaret Hale, but Charles Dickens, the editor of Household Words, the magazine in which the novel was serialised, insisted on North and South.

Gaskell's first novel, Mary Barton (1848), focused on relations between employers and workers in Manchester from the perspective of the working poor; North and South uses a protagonist from southern England to show and comment on the perspectives of mill owners and workers in an industrialising city. The novel is set in the fictional industrial town of Milton in the north of England. Forced to leave her home in the unruffled, rural south, Margaret Hale settles with her parents in Milton. She witnesses the ruthless world wrought by the Industrial Revolution, seeing employers and workers clashing in the first strikes. Sympathetic to the needy (whose courage and tenacity she admires and among whom she makes friends), she clashes with John Thornton: a nouveau riche cotton-mill owner who is scornful of his workers. The novel traces her growing understanding of the complexity of labour relations and their influence on well-meaning mill owners and her conflicted relationship with John Thornton. Gaskell based her depiction of Milton on Manchester, where she lived as the wife of a Unitarian minister.

== Publication ==
=== Serialisation ===
North and South originally appeared in 20 weekly episodes from September 1854 to January 1855 in Household Words, edited by Charles Dickens. During this period Charles Dickens dealt with the same theme in Hard Times (also a social novel), which was published in the same magazine from April to August 1854.

Hard Times, which shows Manchester (the satirical Coketown) in a negative light, challenged Gaskell and made the writing of her own novel more difficult; she had to ascertain that Dickens would not write about a strike. Gaskell found the time and technical constraints of serialised fiction particularly trying. She had planned to write 22 episodes but was "compelled to desperate compression" to limit the story to 20. North and South was less successful than Hard Times. On 14 October 1854, after six weeks, sales dropped so much that Dickens complained about what he called Gaskell's "intractability" because she resisted his demands for concision. He found the story "wearisome to the last degree".

=== Title ===
The novel's title (imposed by Dickens) focuses on the difference in lifestyle between rural southern England, inhabited by the landed gentry and agricultural workers, and the industrial north, populated by capitalist entrepreneurs and poverty-stricken mill workers; the north–south division was cultural and economic. The story centres on haughty Margaret Hale, who learns to overcome her prejudices against the North in general and charismatic manufacturer John Thornton in particular. Gaskell would have preferred to call the novel Margaret Hale (as she had done in 1848 for her novel Mary Barton), but Dickens prevailed. He wrote in a 26 July 1854 letter that "North South" seemed better, encompassing more and emphasising the opposition between people who are forced by circumstances to meet face-to-face.

Working on the final chapters of the novel in December at Lea Hurst, Florence Nightingale's family home near Matlock in Derbyshire, Gaskell wrote that she would rather call her novel Death and Variations because "there are five dead, each beautifully consistent with the personality of the individual". This remark, although probably a joke, emphasises the importance of death in the story. Death affects Margaret profoundly, gradually encouraging her independence; this allows Gaskell to analyse the character's deep emotions and focus on the social system's harshness in the deaths of Boucher and Bessy.

=== Book ===
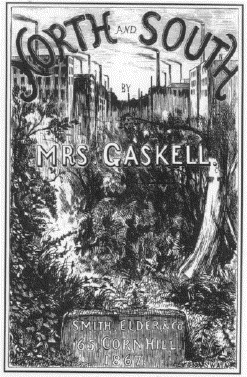
Cover of an 1867 edition, illustrated by George du Maurier

Chapman & Hall (London) first published the novel in 1855 as two volumes of 25 and 27 chapters each. Chapman & Hall issued a second edition in 1855 due to the presence of two paragraphs from Volume II, Chapter xix in Volume II, Chapter xxii. To align the pagination, the second edition adds an extra paragraph in Volume II, Chapter xxiii. That year, Harper and Brothers published it in New York and Tauchnitz published the more-complete second edition in Leipzig as part of a Collection of English Writers. Many editions were published during Gaskell's lifetime.

The text of the book, particularly the ending, differs significantly from that of the serialised episodes. Gaskell included a brief preface saying that due to the restrictive magazine format, she could not develop the story as she wished: "Various short passages have been inserted, and several new chapters added". She tried to evade the limitations of a serialised novel by elaborating on events after the death of Mr. Hale and adding four chapters: the first and last chapters and two chapters on the visits by Mr. Bell to London and by Margaret and Mr. Bell to Helstone. This edition also adds chapter titles and epigraphs. The preface concludes with a quotation from the conclusion of John Lydgate's Middle-English fable, The Churl and the Bird (spelling modernised).

Loreau and Mrs. H. of Lespine, "with the authorisation of the Author", translated the novel into French using the first revised edition. It was published in Paris by Hachette in 1859, and reprinted at least twice: in 1860 as Marguerite Hale (Nord et Sud) and in 1865 as Nord et Sud.

== Plot ==
Nineteen-year-old Margaret Hale has lived for almost 10 years in London with her cousin Edith and her wealthy Aunt Shaw, but when Edith marries Captain Lennox, Margaret happily returns home to the southern village of Helstone. Margaret has refused an offer of marriage from the captain's brother Henry, an up-and-coming barrister. Her life is turned upside down when her father, the local pastor, leaves the Church of England and the rectory of Helstone as a matter of conscience; his intellectual honesty has made him a dissenter. At the suggestion of Mr. Bell, his old friend from Oxford, he settles with his wife and daughter in Milton-Northern (where Mr. Bell was born and owns property). The industrial town in Darkshire (a textile-producing region) manufactures cotton and is in the middle of the Industrial Revolution; masters and workers are clashing in the first organised strikes.

Margaret initially finds the bustling, smoky town of Milton harsh and strange, and she is upset by its poverty. Mr. Hale (in reduced financial circumstances) works as a tutor; one of his pupils is the wealthy and influential manufacturer John Thornton, master of Marlborough Mills. From the outset, Margaret and Thornton are at odds with each other; she sees him as coarse and unfeeling, and he sees her as haughty. He is attracted to her beauty and self-assurance, however, and she begins to admire how he has risen from poverty.

During the 18 months she spends in Milton, Margaret gradually learns to appreciate the city and its hard-working people, especially Nicholas Higgins (a union representative) and his daughter Bessy, whom she befriends. Bessy is ill with byssinosis from inhaling cotton dust, which eventually kills her.

A workers' strike ensues. An outraged mob of workers breaks into Thornton's compound, where he has his home and his factory, after he imports Irish workers as replacements. Thornton sends for soldiers, but before they arrive, Margaret begs him to talk to the mob to try to avoid bloodshed. When he appears to be in danger, Margaret rushes out and shields him; she is struck by a stone. The mob disperses, and Thornton carries the unconscious Margaret indoors.

Thornton proposes; Margaret declines, unprepared for his unexpected declaration of love and offended by assumptions that her action in front of the mob meant that she cares for him. Thornton's mother, wary of Margaret's haughty ways, is galled by Margaret's rejection of her son.

Margaret's brother Frederick (who lives in exile as he is wanted for his part in a naval mutiny) secretly visits their dying mother. Thornton sees Margaret and Frederick together and assumes that he is her lover. Leonards, Frederick's shipmate, later recognises Frederick at the train station. They argue; Frederick pushes Leonards away, and Leonards dies shortly afterwards. When the police question Margaret about the scuffle, she lies and says she was not present. Thornton knows that Margaret lied, but in his capacity as magistrate, declares the case closed to save her from possible perjury. Margaret is humbled by his deed on her behalf; she no longer merely looks down on Thornton as a hard master, but begins to recognise the depth of his character.

Higgins, at Margaret's behest, approaches Thornton for a job and eventually obtains one. Thornton and Higgins learn to appreciate and understand each other.

Mr. Hale visits his oldest friend, Mr Bell, in Oxford. He dies there, and Margaret returns to live in London with Aunt Shaw. She visits Helstone with Mr. Bell and asks him to tell Thornton about Frederick, but Mr Bell dies before he can do so. He leaves Margaret a legacy which includes Marlborough Mills and the Thornton house.

Thornton faces bankruptcy, due to market fluctuations and the strike. He learns the truth about Margaret's brother from Higgins and comes to London to settle his business affairs with Margaret, who is his new landlord. When Margaret offers to lend Thornton some of her money, he realises that her feelings towards him have changed, and he again proposes marriage. Since she has learned to love him, she accepts.

== Characters ==
- Margaret Hale: The protagonist, she is proud and spirited and very fond of her parents (especially her father). She is 18 years old at the start of the story, before she returns to Helstone, and has been living mainly with her aunt (Mrs. Shaw) and her cousin Edith in London since she was nine years old.
- John Thornton: Owner of a local mill, a friend and student of Margaret's father and Margaret's love interest.
- Nicholas Higgins: An industrial worker whom Margaret befriends. He has two daughters, Bessy and Mary.
- Hannah Thornton: John Thornton's mother, who reveres her son and dislikes Margaret (especially after Margaret rejects his proposal).
- Fanny Thornton: John's younger sister.
- Bessy Higgins: Nicholas Higgins' daughter, who is fatally ill from working in the mills.
- Mary Higgins: Nicholas Higgins' youngest daughter.
- John Boucher: A worker and the father of six children, who has conflicted emotions during the strike.
- Richard Hale: Margaret's father, a dissenter who leaves his vicarage in Helstone to work as a private tutor in Milton.
- Maria Hale: Margaret's mother, from a respectable London family. At Milton she often complains that the air as too damp and "relaxing", and not good for her health.
- Dixon: Servant of the Hales, who served Maria Hale before her marriage and is devoted to her. Dixon disapproves of Richard Hale (who is socially inferior to Maria), and regards her mistress's marriage as her social downfall.
- Mr. Bell: Old friend of Richard Hale and godfather of Margaret.
- Mrs. Shaw: Margaret's aunt, Edith's mother, and Maria Hale's sister. The widow of General Shaw, she lives in Harley Street in London. Although she is well-off compared to Maria, she believes herself less fortunate since she did not marry for love.
- Edith: Margaret's pretty cousin, who is intellectually inferior to her, shallow, innocent, and spoiled like a child, but not malicious and sees Margaret as a beloved sister. She marries Captain Lennox early in the story.
- Henry Lennox: Young lawyer and the brother of Captain Lennox. Meticulous and intelligent, he loves Margaret and considers her "queenly". Margaret sees him as a friend, and rebuffs his romantic interest early in the story.
- Frederick Hale: Margaret's older brother, a fugitive living in Spain since his involvement in a mutiny while serving under a cruel officer in the British Navy.
- Leonards: Frederick's fellow sailor, who did not mutiny and wants to turn Frederick in for a reward

== Critical reception ==
In her introduction to The Cambridge Companion to Elizabeth Gaskell (2007), a collection of essays representing current Gaskell scholarship, Jill L. Matus stresses the author's growing stature in Victorian literary studies and how her innovative, versatile storytelling addressed the rapid changes during her lifetime. It was not always that way; her reputation from her death to the 1950s was dominated by Lord David Cecil's assessment in Early Victorian Novelists (1934) that she was "all woman" and "makes a creditable effort to overcome her natural deficiencies but all in vain".

Contemporary reviews were critical, similar to those of Mary Barton. A scathing, unsigned critique in The Leader accused Gaskell of making errors about Lancashire which a resident of Manchester would not make and said that a woman (or clergymen and women) could not "understand industrial problems", would "know too little about the cotton industry" and had no "right to add to the confusion by writing about it".

After reading the fifth episode, Charlotte Brontë believed that it was only about the church and "the defence of those who in conscience, disagree with it and consider it their duty to leave". However, Brontë acknowledged that her friend "understands the genius of the North". Although Richard Holt acknowledged some interest in the novel in The Critical Review, he complained that its plot is disjointed and the characters change by leaps and bounds "in the manner of kangaroos". George Sand said that the novel could interest a gentleman while being accessible to a young woman.

Gaskell's novels, with the exception of Cranford, gradually slipped into obscurity during the late 19th century; before 1950, she was dismissed as a minor author with "good judgment and feminine sensibilities". Archie Stanton Whitfield wrote that her work was "like a nosegay of violets, honeysuckle, lavender, mignonette and sweet briar" in 1929, and Cecil said that she lacked the "masculinity" necessary to properly deal with social problems. However, the tide began to turn in Gaskell's favour when, in the 1950s and 60s, socialist critics like Kathleen Tillotson, Arnold Kettle and Raymond Williams re-evaluated the description of social and industrial problems in her novels, and—realising that her vision went against the prevailing views of the time—saw it as preparing the way for vocal feminist movements. In the early 21st century, with Gaskell's work "enlisted in contemporary negotiations of nationhood as well as gender and class identities", North and South, one of the first industrial novels describing a conflict between employers and workers, is seen as depicting complex social conflicts and offering more satisfactory solutions through Margaret Hale: spokesperson for the author and Gaskell's most mature creation.

== Themes ==
=== Modernity versus tradition ===
The change in title of Gaskell's fourth novel from Margaret Hale to Dickens' suggested North and South underscores its theme of modernity versus tradition. Until the end of the 18th century, power in England was in the hands of the aristocracy and landed gentry based in the south. The Industrial Revolution unsettled the centuries-old class structure, shifting wealth and power to manufacturers who mass-produced goods in the north. Cities such as Manchester, on which Gaskell modelled her fictional Milton, were hastily developed to house workers who moved from the semi-feudal countryside to work in the new factories. The south represents the past (tradition): aristocratic landowners who inherited their property, collected rent from farmers and peasants and assumed an obligation for their tenants' welfare. The north represents the future (modernity): its leaders were self-made men like Gaskell's hero, John Thornton, who accumulated wealth as working, middle-class entrepreneurs. In their view, philanthropy or charity – giving something for nothing – was a dangerous imbalance of the relationship between employers and employees (which was based on the exchange of cash for labour).

=== Authority and rebellion ===
Rebellion against an authority seen as unfair is woven throughout the story. Established institutions are seen as inhumane or selfish, and therefore fallible; Mr. Hale breaks with the church on a matter of conscience, and Frederick Hale participates in a mutiny against the navy and is forced into exile because the law would hang him for what he considered a just cause. His rebellion parallels the strike by workers who take up the cause to feed their children. Both are impotent and engaged in a struggle (a war, in the eyes of the workers) whose terms are dictated by those who maintain their power by force: the law and the mill masters. Margaret rebels in ways that express her liberty: ignoring social proprieties and challenging authority by lying to the police to protect her brother, from whom she learns that arbitrary, unjust, and cruel power can be defied not for oneself but on behalf of the unfortunate. Even Mrs. Hale rebels in her own way; she is "prouder of Frederick standing up against injustice, than if he had been simply a good officer".

The theme of power is also central. Thornton represents three aspects of power and the authority of the ruling class: a manufacturer respected by his peers (economic power), a magistrate (judicial power) and someone who can summon the army (political power) to quell the strike. There is energy, power and courage in the struggle for a better life by Milton's residents. Margaret demonstrates power in her verbal jousting with Thornton, forcing him to reflect on the validity of his beliefs and eventually change his view of workers from mere providers of labour to individuals capable of intelligent thought. When she reaches age 21, Margaret takes control of her life, resolves to live as she chooses, and learns how to manage wealth inherited from Mr. Bell.

=== Feminine and masculine roles ===
The notion of separate spheres dominated Victorian beliefs about gender roles, assuming that the roles of men and women are clearly delineated. Public life (including work) is within the masculine domain, and private life (domesticity) is within the feminine. The expression of feelings is considered feminine, and aggression is seen as masculine. Resolving conflict with words is feminine, and men are likely to resort to physical resolution (including war). The mistress of the home is the guardian of morality and religion and "The Angel in the House". The public sphere is considered dangerously amoral and, in the work of authors such as Dickens, disasters ensue when characters do not conform to contemporary standards.

This notion is questioned in North and South. In Margaret Hale, the separation is blurred and she is forced by circumstances to assume a masculine role, organising the family's departure from Helstone and assuming much of the responsibility for the family in Milton (including encouraging her father). She carries the load alone, behaving like a "Roman girl" because Mr. Hale is weak and irresolute. When Higgins slips away and her father trembles with horror at Boucher's death, Margaret goes to Mrs. Boucher, breaks the news of her husband's death, and cares for the family with dedication and efficiency. She summons her brother Frederick, a naval officer who is crushed with grief at the death of his mother. To protect her brother, Margaret later lies about their presence at the train station on the day of his departure.

Thornton and Higgins, while not denying their masculinity, demonstrate compassion. Higgins in particular, whom Thornton considers among "mere demagogues, lovers of power, at whatever costs to others", assumes the responsibility for raising the Boucher children and embodies maternal tenderness (lacking in Mrs. Thornton) and strength (not possessed by Mrs. Hale) and dignity. Gaskell endows John Thornton with tenderness (a soft spot, according to Nicholas Higgins). Although Thornton's pride hides this capacity from public view, he shows it in his affection for his mother and his quiet attention to the Hales. He expresses it more obviously when he later develops relations with his workers beyond the usual cash-for-labour, builds a canteen for the workers, and sometimes shares meals with them. Margaret and Thornton's evolution eventually converges and, after learning humility, they are partially freed from the shackles of separate spheres; he develops friendly relations at the mill, and she asserts her independence from her cousin's life. Margaret initiates their business meeting, which he interprets as a declaration of love. In the final scene, she controls the financial situation and he reacts emotionally. They now meet as man and woman, no longer the manufacturer from the north and the lady from the south. The blurring of roles is also evident among the workers, many of whom (like Bessy) are women.

=== Other themes ===
==== Special and changing relationships ====
Certain family relationships are emphasised (Margaret and her father, Higgins and Bessy, Mrs. Hale and Frederick), all interrupted by death. The tie between Thornton and his mother is particularly deep and, on Mrs. Thornton's side, exclusive and boundless: "her son, her pride, her property". Ordinarily cold, she tells him: "Mother's love is Given by God, John. It holds fast for ever and ever". Parent-child relationships are often metaphors for relations between employers and workers in Victorian literature. In chapter XV, "Men and Master", Margaret rejects this paternalistic view (expressed by Thornton) as infantilising the worker. She favours, instead, helping workers grow and become emancipated. Friendships between people of different social classes, education and cultural backgrounds (between Mr. Hale and Thornton, Margaret and Bessy, and Thornton and Higgins) prefigure Gaskell's desired human relations which blur class distinctions. Margaret performs "lowly" tasks and Dixon becomes a confidante of Mrs. Hale, who develops a relationship of respect, affection, and understanding with the maid.

==== Religious context ====
Gaskell, the daughter, and wife of a pastor, did not write a religious novel, although religion plays an important role in her work. Unitarians interpreted biblical texts symbolically, rather than literally. They did not believe in original sin or that women were guiltier or weaker than men, and were more liberal than Methodists, Anglicans or Dissenters. North and South presents a typical picture of Unitarian tolerance in one evening scene: "Margaret the Churchwoman, her father the Dissenter, Higgins the Infidel, knelt down together". The Thorntons do not invoke religion as the Hales do, although Mrs. Thornton reads Matthew Henry's Exposition of the Old and New Testaments. Although the re-institution in 1850 by Pope Pius IX of a Roman Catholic hierarchy in England was generally strongly condemned, Gaskell has an open mind about Catholicism and Frederick Hale converts to his Spanish wife's religion.

Biblical references appear in several forms. Chapter VI cites the Book of Job, ii. 13); there is an allusion to the elder brother in the Parable of the Prodigal Son, and Margaret paraphrases the definition of charity ("that spirit which suffereth long and is kind and seeketh not her own") from the First Epistle to the Corinthians. However, Gaskell cautions against misuse; Bessy Higgins reads the Apocalypse to cope with her condition and interprets the parable of Dives and Lazarus so simplistically that Margaret counters vigorously: "It won't be division enough, in that awful day, that some of us have been beggars here, and some of us have been rich—we shall not be judged by that poor accident, but by our faithful following of Christ". Margaret and Thornton follow a path of conversion which leads to reconciliation, acknowledging their "unworthiness". Margaret, who has the longest way to go, is crushed by guilt from her lie and by shame from being debased in Thornton's eyes. Francis de Sales encourages her to seek "the way of humility", despite Mr. Bell's attempts to minimise and rationalise her lie as told in a panic. Thornton, on the brink of ruin like Job, tries not to be outraged while his mother rebels against the injustice of his situation ("Not for you, John! God has seen fit to be very hard on you, very") and gives fervent thanks for the "great blessing" his existence gives her.

== Literary analysis ==
=== Construction ===
==== Austen's legacy ====
The influence of Jane Austen's Pride and Prejudice on North and South is frequently noted. From plot points such as Margaret refusing Thornton's first proposal, to the protagonists' character traits, the parallels between the two novels are clear. Margaret and Elizabeth Bennet both share haughty, intelligent, but prejudiced natures, while Thornton is proud, reticent and powerful like Darcy. According to Nils Clausson in "Romancing Manchester: Class, Gender, and the Conflicting Genres of Elizabeth Gaskell's North and South", the "same romance plot - a rich, proud man subdued by a strong-willed, independent and intelligent woman - reappears half a century later [than Pride and Prejudice] in North and South" (3). Clausson asserts that Austen created the prototypical romance which Gaskell "transposed to mid-Victorian Manchester" (3). Combining romance with the conflicting realism of the social problem novel, Gaskell updates and complicates the earlier plot, a point explored at length by Matthew Sussman in "Austen, Gaskell, and the Politics of Domestic Fiction." In The Politics of Stories in Victorian Fiction (1988), Rosemarie Bodenheimer writes that she prefers to study the novel's relationship with Charlotte Brontë's Shirley but sees in the "description of strong domestic qualities" and "social optimism" an industrial Pride and Prejudice. Patricia Ingham also compares North and South to Shirley. Ann Banfield compares North and South to Mansfield Park for two reasons: Margaret Hale, like Fanny Price, is transplanted in a place she conquers, and the novel is built on an opposition of places on a larger scale.

==== False starts ====
The novel has three beginnings, two of them illusory: the first is the wedding preparation in London, the second the heroine's return to Helstone and the third (often considered the real start of the story) narrates the departure for Milton in chapter seven. The first chapters, according to Martin Dodsworth, are false leads of what the novel is about rather than the author's clumsiness; they tell the reader what the story is not about. Bodenheimer interprets the early chapters not as false starts but as demonstrating Gaskell's theme of societal and personal "permanent state(s) of change" and integral to the novel. The early chapters in different places have been interpreted as presenting a theme of mobility. In moving from one place to another Margaret better understands herself and the world, advancing Gaskell's intention to place her in the public sphere.

The opening chapters of North and South indicate an apparent novel of manners in the style of Jane Austen, with preparations for the marriage in London of a silly bride and a lively, intelligent heroine; in the country village of Helstone (a fictional place in the English county of Hampshire), a bachelor in search of fortune (Henry Lennox) woos – and is rejected by – Margaret. Deirdre David, in Fictions of Resolution in Three Victorian Novels (1981), suggests that Margaret's abandonment of London society indicates that she is out of place in the south and her adjustment to the north is plausible.

Gaskell's novel of manners has the broader context of an industrial novel about the north-west of England, where young girls (like Bessy) die of "cotton consumption"; capitalists disregard legal obligations, and workers refuse prophylactic facilities, instigate strikes and foment riots. It can be criticised, as by Martin Dodsworth, for giving the love affair precedence over the industrial context and for dwelling on the emotional conflict between Margaret and Thornton. However, North and South is not simply an industrial Pride and Prejudice. Margaret acquires stature and a public role, challenging the Victorian idea of separate spheres. She befriends Bessy Higgins (a young, working-class woman), gradually abandons her aversion to "shoppy people" and, recognising Thornton's qualities, crosses social classes to consider herself "not good enough" for him. Although the novel ends in Harley Street (where it began), Margaret's estrangement from the vain, superficial world of her cousin Edith and Henry Lennox is emphasised by her choice of Thornton and Milton.

==== Blunders ====
As the chapter titles "First Impressions", "Mistakes", "Mistakes Cleared Up", "Mischances" and "Atonement" indicate that North and South is peppered with Margaret's blunders and problematic situations with other characters which create misunderstandings. Some of Margaret's blunders stem from ignoring customs, some from not understanding them and still others from rejecting Milton's social customs (such as a frank, familiar handshake). Other characters fail to carry out important actions: Dixon does not tell Margaret that Thornton attended her mother's funeral, and Mr. Bell dies before he can explain to Thornton why Margaret lied. Margaret feels misunderstood, unable to take control of her life and explain a world she does not understand.

Other gaffes are due to Margaret's ignorance; accustomed to London's chic salons, she is unaware that she is seen as wearing her shawl "as an empress wears her drapery" and serving tea with "the air of a proud reluctant slave". She receives marriage proposals awkwardly: Henry Lennox's declaration of love is "unpleasant" and makes her uncomfortable, and she feels "offended" and assaulted by John Thornton's proposal. Margaret naively believes that the rioters can be negotiated with and is unaware that she and her brother, Frederick, resemble a loving couple on a train-station platform (O'Farrell, 1997, p. 68). Bodenheimer sees this "mistakenness" as purposeful: "In its every situation, whether industrial politics or emotional life, traditional views and stances break down into confusing new ones, which are rendered in all the pain of mistakenness and conflict that real human change entails". Perhaps this is why Margaret's blunders do not always have negative consequences; when she admits she is disappointed that Thornton has refused to hire Higgins, she is ashamed that he hears her remark. Thornton reconsiders, eventually offering Higgins a job. In the final chapter, she does not seem to realise that a "simple proposition" to bail out the factory (a business arrangement) could hurt Thornton's pride or be seen as shocking from a "lady". Bodenheimer interprets scenes like this as "deep confusion in a time of personal change and revision" which brings the lovers together.

=== Style and narrative ===
==== Narrative techniques ====
The first description of Marlborough Mills in Chapter XV is through Margaret's eyes and thoughts, and the omniscient narrator delves into the inner thoughts of her main characters and occasionally interjects her observations. Thornton "thought that he disliked seeing one who had mortified him so keenly, but he was mistaken. It was a stinging pleasure to be in the room with her ... But he was no great analyser of his own motives, and was mistaken as I have said". The narrative sometimes slips into free indirect discourse; Mrs. Thornton silently calls Margaret's embroidery of a small piece of cambric "flimsy, useless work" when she visits the Hales.

Bodenheimer believes that the narrator is interested in the psychology of her characters: their inner selves, how their contentious interactions with others subconsciously reveal their beliefs and how the changes they experience reflect their negotiation of the outside world. also focuses on Gaskell's depiction of "interiority" (the psychic process), expressed in dreams and trances such as Thornton's dream of Margaret as a temptress or the rioters' "trance of passion". The phrase "as if" appears over 200 times, suggesting Gaskell's reluctance to appear too definitive in her narration: "Bessy, who had sat down on the first chair, as if completely tired out with her walk" and "[Thornton] spoke as if this consequence were so entirely logical". The phrase is primarily used when exploring the characters' sensations and feelings: "As if she felt his look, she turned to him"; "He had shaken off his emotion as if he was ashamed of ever giving way to it", and "She lifted up her head as if she took pride in any delicacy of feeling which Mr. Thornton had shown". Gaskell uses it when exploring the unconscious process that allows Thornton, whose suffering in love disturbs his composure and control of his feelings, to communicate with Higgins: " ... and then the conviction went in, as if by some spell, and touched the latent tenderness of his heart".

==== Style and language ====
According to Bodenheimer, North and South's narrative may sometimes appear melodramatic and sentimental ("But, for all that—for all his savage words, he could have thrown himself at her feet, and kissed the hem of her garment" in chapter 29)—particularly in the riot scene—but she sees Gaskell's best writing as "done with the unjudging openness to experience" which the author shares with D. H. Lawrence. Jill L. Matus finds Gaskell's vocabulary "Gothicised" in its descriptions of the characters' agonised inner life—their responses to suffering and pain—which may appear melodramatic out of context. However, "the language of shock and horror is absorbed into the realist texture of the novel's narration" and is consistent with the extreme conditions of the novel's external world.

A number of 19th-century authors were interested in native dialects: Scottish for Sir Walter Scott, Irish for Maria Edgeworth. Gaskell, influenced by her husband's work, did not hesitate to give her Milton workers Mancunian expressions and vocabulary without going as far as Emily Brontë's transcription of Yorkshire pronunciation or Dickens' Yarmouth fishermen in David Copperfield. She developed a reputation for the skilful use of dialect to indicate status, age or intimacy between speakers.

Margaret's adaptation to the culture is demonstrated through language. When her mother reproaches her for using Milton's vulgar provincialisms (such as "slack of work"), Margaret replies that since she lives in an industrial city, she must speak its language when called on to do so. She cites a word which may be vulgar but which she finds expressive ("knobstick") and uses a local term ("redding up" – tidying) to Boucher's small children: "redding up the slatternly room". Gaskell begins each chapter with a poetic quote to accentuate a relevant theme, such as interior conflicts ("My heart revolts within me, and two voices / Make themselves audible within my bosom"—Wallenstein, chapter XVIII), duality ("On earth is known to none / The smile that is not sister to a tear." Elliott, chapter XXI), courtship, duty, suffering, steadfast courage, honesty, time and change.

=== Social conditions ===
==== Context ====
Gaskell lived during the period of upheaval which followed the Industrial Revolution, and was aware of the difficult conditions of daily life and the health problems suffered by the workers of Manchester. North and South has been interpreted by Roberto Dainotto as "a kind of apocalyptic journey into the inferno of the changing times—modern poverty, rage, desperation, militant trade unionism and class antagonism". The strike described in North and South resembles the Preston strike, which occurred the year before the novel was published. The strike's slogan was "ten per cent and no surrender", and it was led by George Cowell and Mortimer Grimshaw. Lasting nearly seven months (from September 1853 to April 1854), it was ultimately unsuccessful.

The strike is described in detail, with intelligent leaders like Higgins, the desperate violence and savagery of the rioters, and the reactions of both sides. Through the eyes of Margaret, a horrified, compassionate outsider, Gaskell illustrates the social misery of the slums Margaret visits, misery occasionally documented in parliamentary papers (blue books) with suggestive illustrations which resulted in the Factory Act 1833.

Gaskell uses a cause of conflict between masters and workers (the installation of ventilators in the carding rooms) to illustrate the greed of one and the ignorance of the other, making social progress difficult, and calls attention to anti-Irish prejudice in a city where the Irish are a small minority. She exposes the beliefs and reasoning of manufacturers in Thornton's defence of a theory approaching social Darwinism: capitalism as naturally (almost physically) obeying immutable laws, a relentless race to progress in which humanity is sacrificed; the weak die, whether they are masters or workers. Mrs. Thornton expresses the middle-class view of the working class as "a pack of ungrateful hounds".

==== Gaskell's position ====
North and South belongs to the canon of "condition of England" novels (also known as social-problem, industrial or social novels) which analyse Victorian social realities, offering "first-hand detailed observations of industrialism, urbanism, class, and gender conflicts". It attempts to answer questions posed by contemporary changes positioning itself between the individual worker freedom championed by John Stuart Mill (author of The Claims of Labor, published in the Edinburgh Review in 1845) and developed by Thornton in Chapter 15 and the responsibility of employers to their employees promoted by John Ruskin and Arthur Helps. It represents a certain paternalism, challenging the cutoff between public and private spheres, freedom and responsibility, workplace and family life, trying to define a balance in relations between employers and workers. Through Margaret and her father, Gaskell criticises the autocratic model which infantilises workers and is defended by Thornton (who does not feel accountable to his workers for his actions or decisions). She advocates for an authority which takes into account the needs of workers, a social and economic contract as advocated by John Locke in Two Treatises of Government, where masters and workers are in solidarity. After the strike, Thornton finally acknowledges that "new forms of negotiation between management and labor are part of modern life"; the strike, which ruined him, was "respectable" because the workers depend on him for money and he depends on them to manufacture his product.

In the class struggle which victimises some (such as Boucher and Bessy), Gaskell does not offer definitive conflict resolution: Thornton's hope for strikes, for instance, is that they no longer be "bitter and venomous". He and Higgins reach a level of understanding beyond a "cash nexus" through Margaret's "ongoing involvement in the process of social change" by urging communication between masters and workers. If the holders of economic power agree to talk to their workers, to consider them as human beings (not tools of production), it may not eliminate social conflicts but will reduce their brutality. The protagonists experience personal transformations which unite them in the end, what Stoneman calls a "balanced emancipation".

According to Catherine Barnes Stevenson, Gaskell may have found women doing factory work problematic; she often referred to "masters and men" and used one dying factory worker (Bessy) to represent women workers, who constituted more than half the factory workers at the time. Stevenson wrote that Gaskell's relative silence on female factory workers may reflect her struggle with the "triumph of the domestic ideology" by the middle class of the mid-1800s. Gaskell hints at the difficulties families such as the Hales have keeping female domestic workers (like Dixon) in their proper – subordinate – place and becoming like members of the family (blurring class differences), a scenario facing industrial workers as well.

== Adaptations ==
=== Television and literature ===
In the first television adaptation (in 1966), Richard Leech played Mr. Thornton and Wendy Williams played Margaret Hale.

In the second television adaptation (in 1975), Patrick Stewart played Mr. Thornton and Rosalind Shanks played Margaret Hale. Tim Pigott-Smith, who played Mr. Hale in the 2004 adaptation, played Frederick (his son) in the 1975 version. In 2004, the BBC aired North & South, a four-episode serial with Daniela Denby-Ashe and Richard Armitage in the lead roles. Sandy Welch wrote the screenplay, and Brian Percival directed. The 2004 version renewed interest in the novel and attracted a wider readership.

Intended as a pastiche of Gaskell's work, the novel Nice Work by David Lodge, was published in 1988. A Sunday Express Book of the Year winner, it was adapted as a television series by the BBC in 1989.

== Bibliography ==
- Bodenheimer, Rosemarie (1991). The Politics of Story in Victorian Social Fiction. Cornell University Press. ISBN 0801499208.
- Burton, Anna (2018). "Remarks on Forest Scenery: North and South and the 'Picturesque'". The Gaskell Journal. 32: 37. ProQuest 2161250237.
- Chapman, Alison (1999). Elizabeth Gaskell: Mary Barton North and South. Duxford: Icon Books. ISBN 9781840460377.
- Clausson, Nils (2007). "Romancing Manchester: Class, Gender, and the Conflicting Genres of Elizabeth Gaskell's "North and South"". The Gaskell Society Journal. 21: 1–20. JSTOR 45185937. ProQuest 1437526280.
- Dainotto, Roberto Maria (2000). Place in Literature: Regions, Cultures, Communities. Cornell University Press. ISBN 978-0-80-143683-3.
- Felber, Lynette (1988). "Gaskell's Industrial Idylls : Ideology and Formal Incongruence in Mary Barton and North and South". Clio. 18 (1): 55–72. INIST 11798966 ProQuest 1300295612.
- Gaskell, Peter (1833). The Manufacturing Population of England: Its Moral, Social, and Physical Conditions, and the Changes which Have Arisen from the Use of Steam Machinery; with an Examination of Infant Labour. Baldwin and Cradock.
- Ingham, Patricia (1996). The language of gender and class: transformation in the Victorian novel. London: Routledge. ISBN 0415082226.
- King, H. I.; Dutton, J. E. (1981). Ten per cent and no surrender: the Preston strike, 1853–1854. London: Cambridge University Press. ISBN 9780521236201.
- Linker, Laura (2015). "Private Selves and Public Conflicts: Mastery and Gender Identity in Elizabeth Gaskell’s North and South.” Gender Forum, no. 51.
- Matus, Jill L. (2007). The Cambridge companion to Elizabeth Gaskell. Cambridge, UK: Cambridge University Press. ISBN 978-0-52-184676-9.
- Mullan, Robert (2006). How novels work. Oxford: Oxford University Press. ISBN 978-0-19-928178-7.
- Nash, Julie (2007). Servants and paternalism in the works of Maria Edgeworth and Elizabeth Gaskell. Aldershot: Ashgate. ISBN 978-0-75-465639-5.
- Navailles, Jean-Pierre (1986). La famille ouvrière dans l'Angleterre victorienne: des regards aux mentalités. Editions Champ Vallon. ISBN 978-2-90-352821-8.
- O'Farrell, Mary Ann (1997). Telling complexions: the nineteenth-century English novel and the blush. Durham, NC [u.a.]: Duke University Press. ISBN 9780822318958.
- Stoneman, Patsy (1987). Elizabeth Gaskell. Bloomington and Indianapolis: Indiana University Press. ISBN 9780253301031.
- Watts, Ruth (1998). Gender, power, and the Unitarians in England, 1760–1860. Longman.
- Whitfield, Archie Stanton (1929). Mrs. Gaskell, Her Life and Works. G. Routledge & sons.
1. Angus Easson, Elizabeth Gaskell, Routledge, 1979, 278 p. (ISBN 9780710000996)
2. Arthur Pollard, Mrs. Gaskell: novelist and biographer, Manchester University Press ND, 1967, 268 p. Read excerpt online
3. Janine Barchas (2008). "Mrs. Gaskell's North and South: Austen's early legacy". In Persuasions The Jane Austen Journal, Chicago, 30: 53–66.
4. Rosemarie Bodenheimer (1979). "North and South: A Permanent State of Change". Nineteenth-Century Fiction 34 (3).
5. Mary Kuhlman (1996). "Education Through Experience in North and South". The Gaskell Journal 10: 14–26. Read online
6. Julie Nash, Servants and paternalism in the works of Maria Edgeworth and Elizabeth Gaskell, Ashgate Publishing, 2007, 130 p. (ISBN 9780754656395) Read excerpt online
7. H. I. Dutton, John Edward King, 'Ten per cent and no surrender': the Preston strike, 1853–1854, Cambridge University Press, 1981 (ISBN 9780521236201)
8. Jean-Pierre Navailles, La Famille ouvrière dans l'Angleterre victorienne: des regards aux mentalités, Editions Champ Vallon, 1983, 335 p. (ISBN 9782903528218)
