= Kargil (disambiguation) =

Kargil is a town in the Indian union territory of Ladakh (formerly part of Jammu and Kashmir state).

Kargil may also refer to:

- Kargil district, a district in Ladakh, headquartered in the town
  - Kargil (Vidhan Sabha constituency), an electoral constituency in the Jammu and Kashmir Legislative Assembly of the Indian union territory of Jammu and Kashmir
- Kargil War, a 1999 armed conflict between India and Pakistan centred in the Kargil district
- Kargil (film), a 2018 Indian Tamil-language film

== See also ==
- Cargill (disambiguation)
- Kargili (disambiguation)
- Kargilik (disambiguation)
- LOC Kargil, a 2003 Indian film based on the Kargil War
- Gunjan Saxena: The Kargil Girl, a 2020 Indian film about Gunjan Saxena, an Indian Air Force officer during the Kargil War
