= David W. T. Cargill =

Scottish philanthropist and art collector (1872–1939)

David William Traill Cargill (1872–1939) was a Scottish philanthropist and art collector. He gives his name to the David W T Cargill Fund. He endowed the David Cargill Chair of Geriatric Medicine at Glasgow University.

He was described as an "art collector of great discrimination".

== Life ==
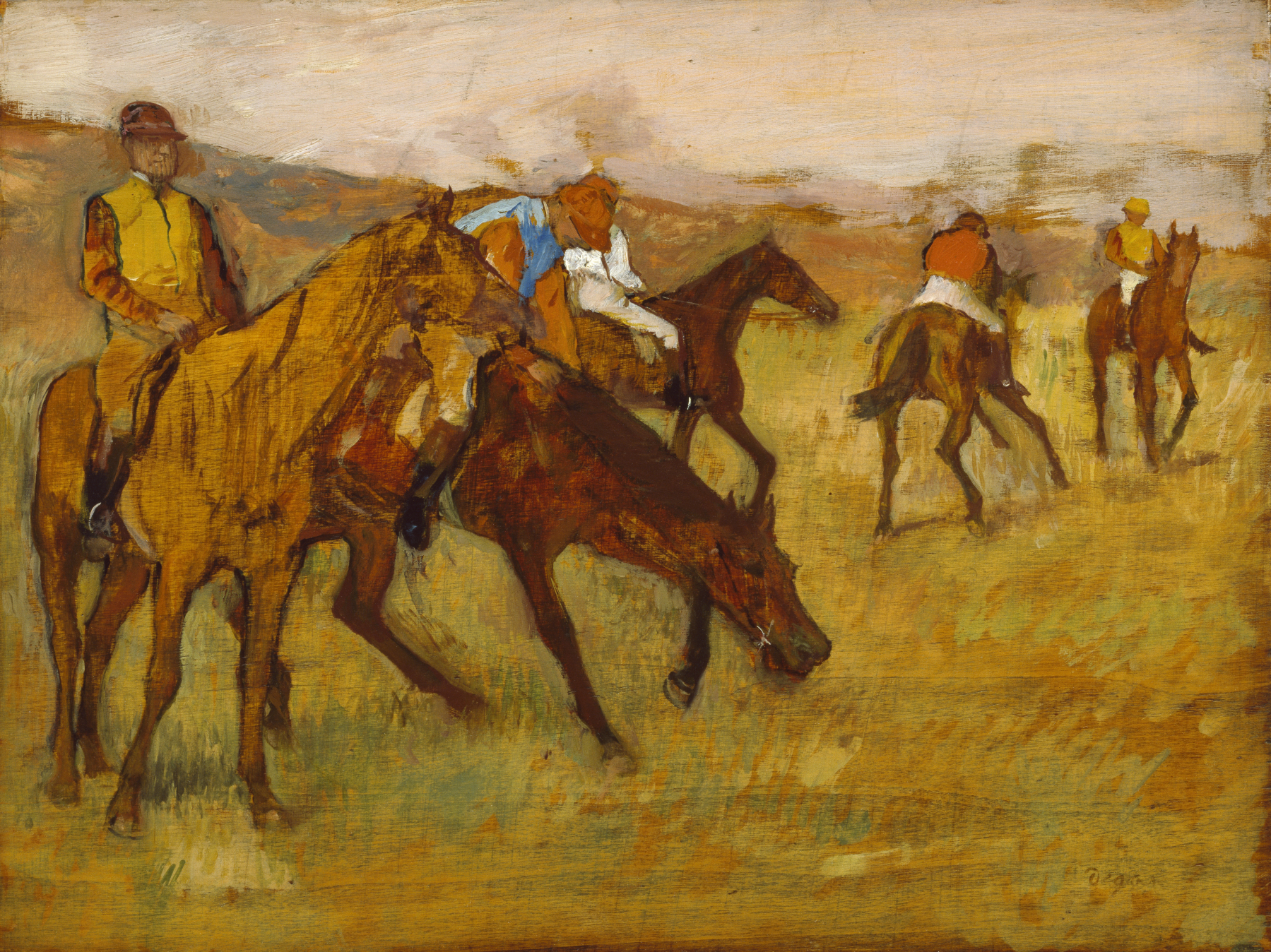
"Jockeys before the Race" by Degas

He was born on 14 January 1872 the son of David Sime Cargill (1827-1905) of 9 Park Terrace in Glasgow. His mother was Margaret Traill (1840-1872) who died at his birth or soon after. His father worked for Milne & Co in the city. Their five storey townhouse faced onto Kelvingrove Park (the house still exists and is a listed building). In 1878 his father married Connell Elizabeth Auld who became David's step-mother.

His father founded the Burmah Oil Company in 1886 and became immensely wealthy.

He worked for Milne & Co in Glasgow and, with his brother Sir John Traill Cargill were also Directors of Burmah Oil.

In 1910 he was living at 59 Partickhill Road in Glasgow.

In March 1920 he bought William McTaggart's "Where the Smugglers Came Ashore" for £2500 through the art dealer Alexander Reid. Other known acquisitions are Renoir's "Mont Sainte-Victoire" and Corot's "Brume matinale au marais". He also owned works by Manet, Monet, Sisley, Pissarro, Van Gogh, Gauguin, Seurat and Cezanne.

In 1922 he bought "Jockeys Before the Race by Degas (through Reid) for £2100.

At some point in the 1930s he bought "Arrangement in Black" (a sister-piece to Arrangement in Grey and Black aka Whistler's Mother) by James Whistler.

He died in Lanark on 5 September 1939. His will sold off his art collection to provide multiple philanthropic donations to the university and to Glasgow's well being. The David W T Cargill Trust created other facilities such as the David Cargill Centre which cares for the elderly and David Cargill House.

== Artistic recognition ==
He was portrayed in the act of analysing art by Honoré Daumier known as "Advice to a Young Artist".

== Family ==
He was married to Berthe Josephine Chopier (d.1947).
