= Cargile =

Cargile is a surname. Notable people with the surname include:

- Steve Cargile (born 1982), American football player
- Winona Cargile Alexander (1893–1984), African-American academic

== See also ==
- Cargill (surname)
