= Helen Cargill Thompson =

Scottish scientist, librarian, and art collector (1933–2020)

Helen Cargill Thompson

Helen Cargill Thompson (12 December 1933 – 28 September 2020) was a Scottish scientist, librarian, art collector and supporter of educational, artistic and heritage organisations.

== Early life ==
Born in Burma where her father worked as a merchant trader, in 1939, Thompson, her parents and two brothers returned to Glasgow to live with her grandparents in Mirrlees Drive, close to Glasgow Botanic Gardens. Her great-granduncle David Sime Cargill was the founder of Burmah Oil., the Cargills having started as East India merchants in Glasgow and merchant traders in Ceylon (today's Sri Lanka), where the business was known as the 'Harrods of Colombo'. Her older brother, William David James Cargill Thompson, was a professor of ecclesiastical history at King's College, London, and her younger brother, John Cargill Thompson, was a playwright.

== Education ==
Thompson attended Cheltenham Ladies College, then studied physiology and pharmacology at St Andrews University, and went on to do a PhD presenting the thesis "The assay of growth hormone and gonadotrophins in relation to clinical problems" at Edinburgh University involving research into the contraceptive pill.

== Career ==
Thompson worked for ten years as a research scientist, then changed career in response to a campaign to recruit scientists to work in libraries as information officers. In 1970 she started her librarianship training in the Andersonian Library at Strathclyde University. On 5 August 1982 she became head of the Andersonian Library's new Reference and Information Division, a post she held until her retirement in 1999.

== Interests ==
Thompson began collecting art in 1985, often buying from the degree shows in Glasgow. In 2000 she gifted her collection of nearly 1,000 artworks to Strathclyde University. It included works by Peter Howson, Avril Paton, James McDonald and Neil MacPherson.

Thompson was a member of, and donor to, many organisations, including:

- Glasgow and West of Scotland Family History Society
- University of Glasgow Friends of the Library
- 3LS Architecture and Design Club
- Charity Education International
- Architectural Heritage Society Of Scotland
- Scottish Pakistani Association
- Graduates’ Association of Strathclyde University
- National Trust for Scotland
- National Library of Scotland, John Murray Archive

== Death ==
Cargill died in Glasgow in September 2020. She left her house in Glasgow to the National Trust of Scotland.

Glasgow City Heritage hosted a talk on Wednesday 16 December 2020 entitled 'James Miller by Fergus Sutherland: A tribute to Dr. Helen Cargill Thompson'

The National Trust for Scotland Glasgow Members' Centre held a talk on Wednesday 13 January 2021 "in memory of our past chairman Dr. Helen Cargill Thomson who died in 2020" by Fergus Sutherland entitled Industrial Pleasures: the Development of Mass Entertainment in Victorian Glasgow.

Her funeral service took place at Maryhill Crematorium on 15 October. The service was conducted by Cargill's nephew, Father Edmund Cargill Thompson.
