= Rosalind Shanks =

British actress

Rosalind Shanks is a British actress and broadcaster.

In 1964, she joined the BBC's Radio Drama Company by winning the Carleton Hobbs Bursary.

Shanks starred as Margaret Hale the heroine in North and South, in 1975, opposite Patrick Stewart as John Thornton. In the same year, she appeared as Joanna Childe in "The Girls of Slender Means" by Muriel Spark, a land mark series with a leading female cast by pioneering female director Moira Armstrong.

In the theatre Rosalind took leading roles including in repertory, at the National Theatre (during Lord Olivier's time in charge), in a world tour of "Shakespeare's People" with Sir Michael Redgrave, and in the West End with Judi Dench and Sian Phillips directed by Sir John Gielgud.

On radio she has played a great many leading roles, including Desdemona to Paul Scofield`s Othello (later in the BBC Radio Collection) and was well known to listeners to Radio 4's "Poetry Please" and "With Great Pleasure". Shanks recorded over 50 books for The RNIB`s Talking Book service, including a major project, with four other readers, of the first recording of the complete Authorised Version of The Bible. She has recorded many narrations, including the narration for the video about St. George’s Chapel Windsor.

Her literary recital work is extensive with a repertoire of over forty programmes on such figures as D. H. Lawrence, Dylan Thomas, Henry James, Keats, Shelley and “The Female Shakespeare”, Gabriel Woolf’s programme on George Eliot. Her first solo programme was on Florence Nightingale. Her recitals with musicians include “Facade” (Sitwell/Walton), “Wood Magic” (Elgar) and “The Road to Prague” (Mozart).

Shanks has been a tutor at The Actors` Centre in Radio Drama and Verse and at The Central School of Speech and Drama for Shakespeare and Verse. She is an Associate of the Royal Academy of Music, having originally studied drama there.

== Select filmography ==
- North and South ... Margaret Hale
- The Girls of Slender Means ... Joanna Childe
- Z-Cars
  - Intrusion: Part 2 ... Ward Sister
  - Intrusion: Part 1 ... Ward Sister
- The Trojan Women ... Woman

No copies of the episodes of Z-Cars that Shanks acted in still exist.
