= The Turn of the Screw (2009 film) =

British television ghost story

- UK release DVD cover
- Based on: The Turn of the Screw by Henry James
- Screenplay by: Sandy Welch
- Directed by: Tim Fywell
- Country of origin: United Kingdom
- Original language: English

Production
- Producer: Colin Wratten
- Running time: 89 minutes
- Production company: BBC

Original release
- Network: BBC One
- Release: 30 December 2009

The Turn of the Screw (also known as Ghost Story: The Turn of the Screw) is a British television film based on Henry James's 1898 ghost story of the same name. Commissioned and produced by the BBC, it was first broadcast on 30 December 2009, on BBC One. The novella was adapted for the screen by Sandy Welch, and the film was directed by Tim Fywell. Although generally true to the tone and story of James's work, the film is set in the 1920s—in contrast to the original 1840s setting—and accentuates sexual elements that some theorists have identified in the novella. The film's story is told in flashbacks during consultations between the institutionalised Ann (Michelle Dockery) and Dr Fisher (Dan Stevens). Ann tells how she was hired by an aristocrat (Mark Umbers) to care for the orphans Miles (Josef Lindsay) and Flora (Eva Sayer). She is met at the children's home, Bly, by Mrs Grose (Sue Johnston), the housekeeper. Ann soon begins to see unknown figures around the manor, and seeks an explanation.

Critics were divided in their reviews of The Turn of the Screw. The acting and tone of the production were generally praised, but the plot's divergences from the original story were less well received. A particular disagreement concerned the film's horrific elements; some critics considered it to be genuinely scary, while others suggested that the horror was not fully effective. The original story has been much analysed owing to its ambiguity, and critics disagreed about the extent to which the film succeeded in portraying this trait. Academic analyses found the film considerably less ambiguous than the novella. The Turn of the Screw was released on DVD on 1 March 2010 in the UK and on 28 April 2015 in North America.

== Plot ==
External videos
- Turn of the Screw trailer The television trailer shown on the BBC for Turn of the Screw (hosted on YouTube)
- "Blindfold Game"; Flora shows Ann her room shortly after the latter's arrival at Bly, but insists that she wear a blindfold. While unable to see, Ann hears voices in the room.
- "Ann's Discovery"; As Miles looks over the grounds, Ann finds the grave of Emily Jessel in the yard of Bly's church. Ann then mistakes Mrs Sarah Grose, also present in the graveyard, for a ghost.

The film's story is told in a series of flashbacks interspersed with discussions between Ann (Dockery), a patient in a sanatorium, and Dr Fisher (Stevens), a skeptical and atheistic psychiatrist. Despite the suggestion of his superior (Redgrave) that he focus upon soldiers who have returned from the First World War, Fisher wishes to help Ann if he can.

In flashbacks, Ann is hired by a wealthy and sophisticated aristocrat (Umbers) to act as a governess for his orphaned nephew and niece who live at Bly. He tells her that he is not to be bothered in London, and that Ann is to deal with any problems that may arise. Ann travels to Bly, where she meets the all-female household staff—led by Mrs Sarah Grose (Johnston), the housekeeper—and then the young Flora (Sayer), one of Ann's new pupils. Ann finds the house unnerving, and the staff standoffish and unwilling to talk. Ann subsequently receives a letter informing her that Miles (Lindsay), her other pupil, has been expelled from his boarding school, but is assured by Mrs Grose that Miles is well-behaved. When he arrives at Bly, Ann finds Miles to be charming, and although he does not explain what happened at school, she does not push him. Her interactions with the children are idyllic, and they sail on Bly's lake and enjoy picnics together. Meanwhile, Ann fantasises about the Master, futilely hoping that he will visit.

Ann discovers that her predecessor, Emily Jessel (Lightfoot), is buried in Bly's church, and is told that Jessel killed herself. She also begins to see the figures of a young man and a young woman around Bly. Mrs Grose dismisses Ann's stories, but one maid, Carla (Walker), tells Ann of the sexually abusive former valet Peter Quint (MacLiam). Mrs Grose reveals that Carla had been badly affected by the War, and is prone to flights of fancy. Later, Ann is woken at night by the figure of the woman, and follows her to find Flora standing next to an open window. The pair see Carla fall from the roof, landing near Miles, who is in the garden. Ann rushes outside, and sees the male figure on the roof. Inside again, Mrs Grose assures Ann that she must be confused.

Ann believes the figures to be the ghosts of Quint and Jessel, seeking to continue their passionate and violent sexual encounters through Miles and Flora. However, she is concerned to find that others apparently cannot see the ghosts. She then begins to suspect that Miles and Flora, having been groomed by and involved in the activities of Quint and Jessel, may be deliberately seeking to bring the pair back. She resolves to leave Bly, but, when saying goodbye to Miles, learns that he, too, sees the figures. Minutes after leaving, she asks to be taken back. Later, Ann panics, believing Miles and Flora to have left the house. She finds them by the lake, but they are playing roughly; when Miles pushes Flora's head under the water, Ann sees the pair as Quint and Jessel. She rushes to intervene, and grapples with a figure alternating between Quint and Miles. When Ann repeatedly strikes Miles, Mrs Grose stops her, and Flora says that she no longer wishes to see Ann. After ordering the staff and Flora away from Bly, Ann waits with Miles to confront Quint. The pair are scared, but when Quint arrives Ann tells Miles to demand that Quint leave him alone. Miles (speaking with Quint's voice) shouts at Ann, but eventually (in his own voice) tells the ghostly Quint that he wishes him to leave. Ann embraces Miles, whose body goes limp.

Ann is found some time later by the police, clutching Miles's dead body, but she refuses to speak of what happened until meeting Dr Fisher. He seems to accept Ann's story, unconvinced by his own psychosexual explanations of her visions. Fisher is dismayed to see Ann led away by the police, accused of Miles's murder, and he sees Quint's face on one of the officers. The film closes with a new governess arriving at Bly.

== Cast ==
- Michelle Dockery as Ann, the governess
- Sue Johnston as Mrs Sarah Grose, Bly's housekeeper
- Dan Stevens as Dr Fisher, a sceptical psychiatrist
- Nicola Walker as Carla, a maid at Bly
- Eva Sayer as Flora, the young girl at Bly
- Josef Lindsay as Miles, the young boy at Bly
- Mark Umbers as The Master
- Corin Redgrave as The professor at the sanatorium
- Wendy Albiston as Baines, the driver
- Sarah Buckland as Diane, a member of staff at Bly
- Edward MacLiam as Peter Quint, the former valet at Bly
- Katie Lightfoot as Emily Jessel, a former governess at Bly
- Nellie Burroughes as A maid abused by Quint
- Peter Bygott as Ann's father
- Honor Cargill-Martin as Young Ann
- Cameron Stewart as The police Inspector

== Production ==
The BBC had previously adapted several horror stories as Christmas films, with their series A Ghost Story for Christmas including adaptations of the M. R. James stories "The Stalls of Barchester Cathedral" (filmed as The Stalls of Barchester), "A Warning to the Curious", "Lost Hearts", "The Treasure of Abbot Thomas" and "The Ash Tree". The Turn of the Screw fits into this "mini-genre" of the Christmas horror film. The BBC executive and drama commissioner Ben Stephenson, discussing The Turn of the Screw, said that "Christmas wouldn't be Christmas without a ghost story for the adults to watch in front of the fire when the children are in bed, and they don't get more chilling than this bold reimagining of the classic Henry James tale." The film was commissioned by Stephenson and Jay Hunt, then controller of BBC One. It was directed by Tim Fywell, and produced by Colin Wratten; the executive producer was Jessica Pope.

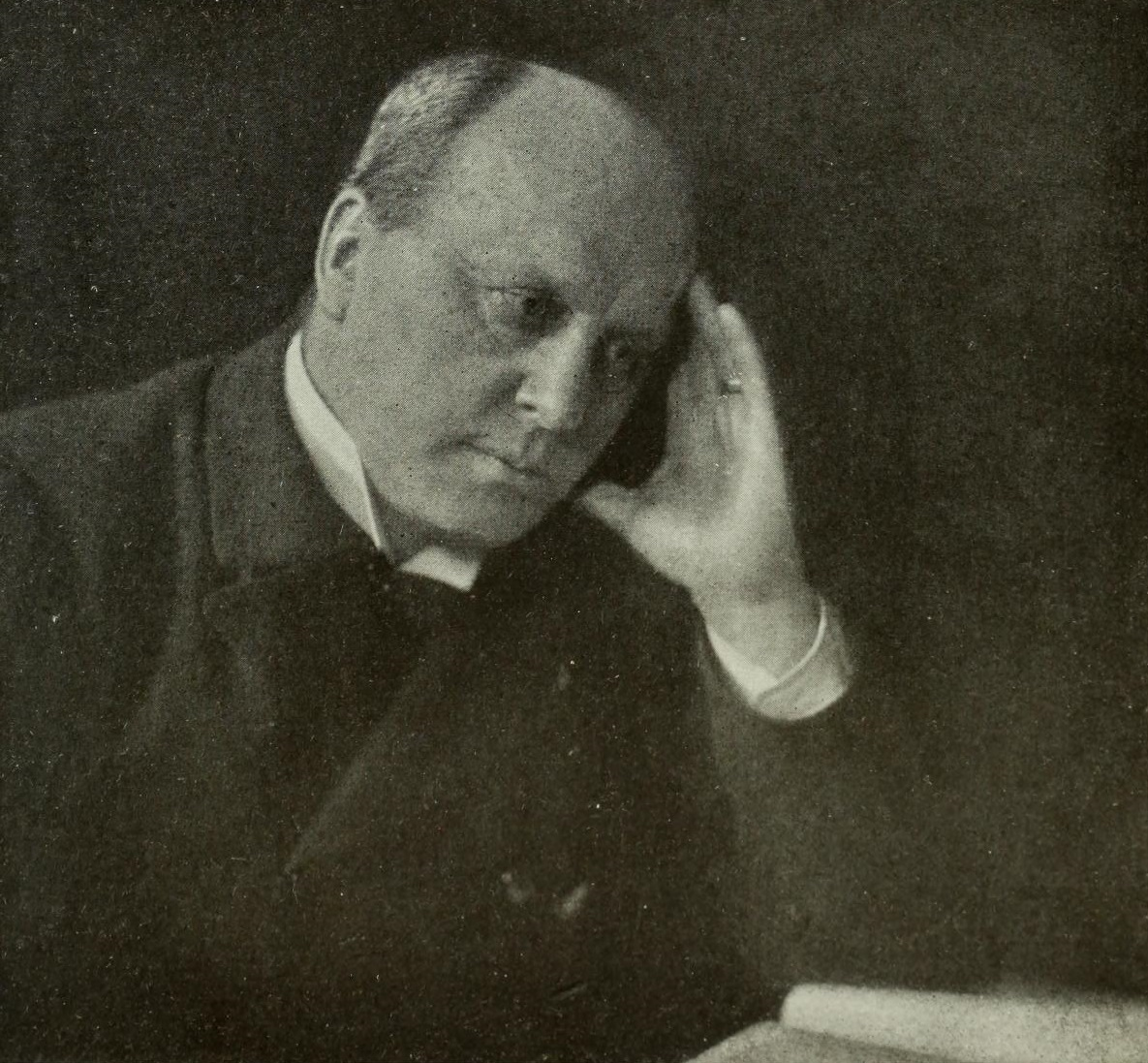
Henry James, author of The Turn of the Screw (1898), in a photograph published in 1904

The film is an adaptation of Henry James's 1898 novella The Turn of the Screw. As one of his more popular stories, it had already been adapted for films and television many times, although not previously by the BBC. The adaptation was screenwritten by Sandy Welch, who set the film in the early 1920s, in contrast to the novella's 1840s setting. This allowed the introduction of the Freudian psychiatrist interviewing the main character; this framing device is not used by James, but both the novella and the film share a first-person narrator. The updated setting also allowed the First World War to account for the lack of male staff at the house. The Freudian and libidinous elements some literary theorists have seen in James's story are particularly prevalent in the film, with Ann's repressed sexual feelings for the Master resulting in a number of highly sexual sequences. Further, Welch added a theological element not present in James's story; Ann's father is a preacher, although Ann herself is unsure of her faith. The psychiatrist, by contrast, is an atheist. When he asks Ann about her faith, she replies that she believes in the Devil.

The adaptation generally mirrors the novella's tone. The television critic Matthew Baylis observed that the film creates unease and horror through distortions of reality, and that The Turn of the Screw is not a "screaming-banshees-and-horrible-corpses style of ghost story". The film utilises subtle horror, including details such as a broken doll on a window ledge, and the fact that viewers never discover certain elements of the story (for example, it is never revealed why the character Miles has been suspended from his boarding school). This, for Baylis, ties to the title of the film: "it's the writer who puts the screw in the hole and the best ones ask the audience to turn it themselves".

The Turn of the Screw was filmed on location in the West Country of England, beginning in August 2009. The scenes at Bly were filmed at Brympton d'Evercy, a manor house near Yeovil, Somerset. Brympton was chosen because of its similarity to Bly House, as described by James, including its extensive grounds and large lake. The railway scenes were filmed at the East Somerset Railway.

The Turn of the Screw starred Michelle Dockery as Ann, Sue Johnston as Mrs Sarah Grose, Dan Stevens as Dr Fisher, Mark Umbers as the Master, Nicola Walker as Carla, Edward MacLiam as Peter Quint and Katie Lightfoot as Emily Jessel. Corin Redgrave, who played the professor, was the son of Michael Redgrave, who starred in The Innocents, a 1961 adaption of The Turn of the Screw. The children, Flora and Miles, were played respectively by Eva Sayer and Josef Lindsay. However, due to the sexual content of the film, the child actors did not attend the preview screenings.

=== Broadcast and release ===
The Turn of the Screw was first shown at 9 pm on BBC One on 30 December 2009, as part of the BBC's Christmas 2009 season. It has since been broadcast on other BBC channels and on Drama. In the UK, the film was released on DVD on 1 March 2010, and distributed by Acorn Media UK. The DVD was rated "15" by the British Board of Film Classification for "infrequent scenes of strong sex". The film was released on DVD for the North American market as Ghost Story: The Turn of the Screw on 28 April 2015. The DVD was unrated and had no extra features. Foreign language versions of the film include television screenings or DVD releases of the film in German (Schloss des Schreckens), Finnish (Ruuvikierre) and Polish (W kleszczach lęku).

== Critical reception ==
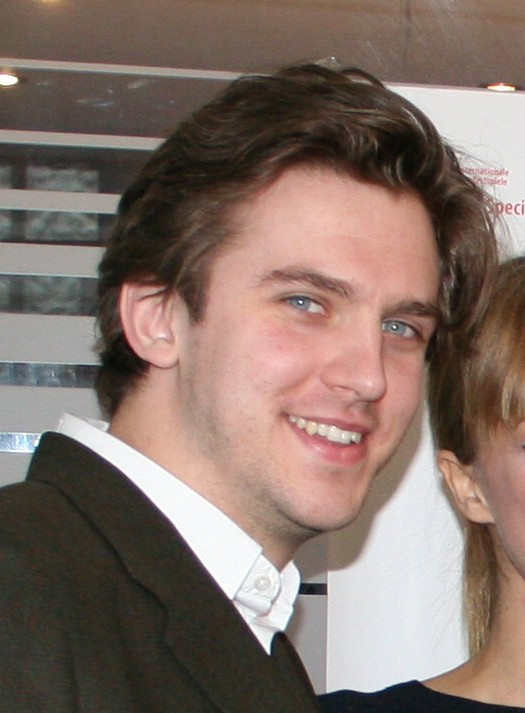
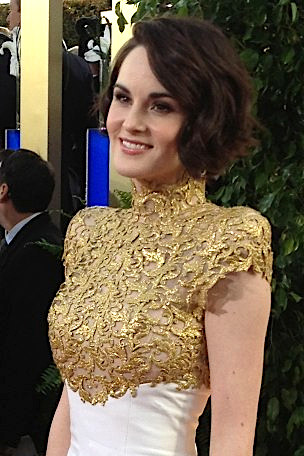
The story is told through a series of flashbacks during conversations between Ann and Dr Fisher, played respectively by Michelle Dockery (right, 2013) and Dan Stevens (left, 2009). The pair later co-starred in Downton Abbey as Mary and Matthew Crawley. In an interview published in Harper's Bazaar, Dockery recalled a meeting after her audition for Downton Abbey: "Until then I'd played much more vulnerable parts, but I remember coming out of the audition, and Dan Stevens was in the waiting room. I said, 'Who are you up for?' and he said, 'Matthew.' ... I walked out and thought, 'Oh, that could work'." For one critic, the presence of the two actors in a pre-Downton Abbey collaboration served to highlight the film, while another said that The Turn of the Screw would allow Downton Abbey fans to "get a little fix of the actors together", with "the duo’s chemistry ... fully on display".

The critical response to The Turn of the Screw was mixed. The film was praised by Matt Baylis, writing in The Express, as one of the better adaptations of James's story. The Times's David Chater, although he did not consider the film "terrifying" or "suppurate[d] in evil", found it "never less than absorbing", suspecting this would be particularly so for viewers unfamiliar with the story. The Daily Telegraph's Simon Horsford felt that The Turn of the Screw "might not work on all levels but it is an unsettling interpretation nonetheless". By contrast, Tom Sutcliffe, writing in The Independent, was unimpressed with the film, considering James's novel to have been "comprehensively vandalised", while Richard Whittaker, writing in The Austin Chronicle, felt that the film was "a particular and peculiar misfire" from Welch. The Turn of the Screw was chosen as "pick of the day" in The Sunday Times, despite the reviewer, Victoria Segal, expressing her view that the film was "far from perfect". But she added that the flaws could be overlooked, and although there are times "when it grinds through the gears with a clunk and clatter", the "spirit" of James's story is retained.

Several other critics praised the way that the film had kept the tone of James's story and the subtle approach to horror. This subtlety, according to a review in the Western Morning News, hit "exactly the right note of terror", and the film was praised as genuinely scary by some critics. Whittaker, though generally critical of the film, felt it strongest when focussed on the house, children and ghosts. Paul Whitelaw, writing in The Scotsman, commended Welch and Fywell for sustaining a horrific atmosphere, and noted that the soundtrack added to the horror. For him, even the use of horror clichés was effective, contributing to the film's atmosphere. The Guardian's Phil Hogan expressed a contrary opinion: while he thought The Turn of the Screw "exquisitely turned out", he felt the film's use of clichés limited the extent to which it was actually scary. In a review for The Leader-Post, Andy Cooper praised the "creepy atmosphere" and tension, but said that the film "[fell] short in the chills department" and "could have done with a few jolts of terror to breathe more life into it".

The divergences from the original novella's plot were generally not well received. Tim Teeman, reviewing The Turn of the Screw for The Times, felt the 1920s setting did not contribute to the story, as it was not properly developed. He compared the film to Sarah Waters's novel The Little Stranger, a ghost story set in the 1920s in which the social upheavals of the decade are explored. Gerard Gilbert, writing both for The Independent and The Arts Desk, felt that Ann's relationship to the Master was "unnecessarily sexed up", and that this element added nothing to the story, and, in fact, detracted from it. In his review of the American DVD release for the Deseret Morning News, Chris Hicks said that he could not see why the changes had been made, and that the literalisation of the sex and violence detracted from the film. Whittaker suggested that The Turn of the Screw was "oddly sexually explicit", and that the changes were unnecessary for the plot. The biggest problem, he suggested, was the introduction of the psychiatrist; his discussions with Ann, which could easily be removed, served to remove the mystery from the plot, in Whittaker's eyes. Sutcliffe was critical of the reframing of the story as a stereotypical account of how "a cocky young man of science has his certainties upturned", and said the film took "the terrifying indeterminacies of the original", turning them "into a slightly shabby ghost-train ride".

Critics disagreed about how successful the film was in capturing the novel's ambiguity, which is part of the enduring appeal of James's story. For Tim Dowling, a columnist for The Guardian, the film failed in this regard. The novella, Dowling explained, can be understood as a straightforward ghost story, but it can also be understood as a story about Ann's madness, and there is further ambiguity concerning whether the children are being controlled by Quint and Jessel, or whether the children are controlling Ann. He suggested that "there's probably a subtlety to all this ambiguity on the page which, when translated to the screen, just looks like having it both ways." As a result, "the narrative was at times more evasive than ambiguous". Whittaker felt that the film failed to appropriately present the novella's ambiguity and implicit themes, saying that the adaptation "feels oddly obligated to fill in all those blanks, and it's really the script's fault". Sutcliffe expressed a similar view; for example, he noted that "when the governess sees Quint on the tower for the first time so do we, and the thing that really haunts us as we read the story—uncertainty—vanishes to be replaced by a much duller kind of fretfulness, about when something is next going to pop out at us." By contrast, Chater and Teeman (both writing for The Times) felt the ambiguity of the film was praiseworthy, with Chater asking whether the ghosts truly exist or are just a manifestation of "hysterical imagination", and Teeman suggesting that viewers will be more likely to believe (with Dr Fisher) that Ann's retelling is accurate. The Scotsman's Whitelaw praised Welch's ability to balance the various subtexts of the film while still delivering an effective narrative.

The cast of the film were praised, with Dowling considering The Turn of the Screw "a slick production with strong performances", and Cooper saying that the film features "a great supporting cast". Critics particularly commended the performances of Dockery and Johnston. Dowling also picked out the performances of Lindsay and Sayer as worthy of note, while Whitelaw praised MacLiam, who was able "to personify pure evil with scarcely a line of dialogue". Segal, by contrast, felt MacLiam was badly cast, which resulted in "one of the story's primary dark forces [looking] more like a member of Elbow than the very essence of evil".

== Literary analysis ==
James's novella The Turn of the Screw has been much analysed in academic literature, and, given that it has been frequently reinterpreted in the arts, discussion of many of the adaptations has found a place in the academic literature on Henry James and neo-Victorian culture. Considering the frame narrative of the film, Anna Viola Sborgi, a literary theorist, argues that the fact that Ann begins the film in a sanatorium conveys the impression that the character is mad, resulting in a loss of ambiguity. Consequently, the film is left less a horror story and more a psychological thriller. Sborgi argues that the film is explicitly made psychological through particular narrative and visual choices; for example, Miles appears at the train station in a ghost-like way through a cloud of steam. The fact that the film is a thriller, she argues, is further expressed through the use of a collage of images before the opening scene. However, the use of horrific imagery (including an open grave) in the collage "highlight[s] the contradiction inherent in this rendering of the novella": while the story is presented as psychological, the viewer is nonetheless drawn into the film as a horror story. Other than the atypical frame narrative, Sborgi considers the adaptation fairly conventional with regard to both setting and costume.

For the literary theorist Thomas S. Hischak, The Turn of the Screw is a weak adaptation of the novella, with poor performances that can be "ascribed to the trite, anachronistic dialogue and leaden direction". He likens the film to In a Dark Place (2006), an earlier adaptation of the novel that focuses upon the supposed sexual aspects of the story. For Hischack, the 2009 film presents a governess who is not successful in repressing her sexuality. Ann's fantasies of her own sexual encounters with the Master, as well as her visions of the sexual encounters between Quint and Jessel, "are among the many obvious and clumsy aspects of this adaptation". Like Sborgi, Hischak sees little ambiguity in the film, calling it a "misguided adaptation that likes to spell things out for the viewer".
