= Honor Cargill-Martin =

English classicist and author (born 1998)

- Born: Honor Isobel Cargill-Martin; 1998 (age 27–28)
- Other name: Honor Cargill
- Education: Lady Margaret Hall, Oxford (BA, MSt); Courtauld Institute of Art (MA); Christ Church, Oxford (PhD)
- Years active: 2015–present
- Family: John Cargill Thompson (maternal grandfather)
- Website: honorcargillmartin.com

Honor Isobel Cargill-Martin (born 1998), also credited as Honor Cargill, is an English classicist and author. She began her career collaborating with her mother Perdita Cargill on YA and middle-grade fiction. She has since authored adult and children's non-fiction.

== Early life and education ==
Cargill-Martin grew up in Barnsbury, North London.

Cargill-Martin attended St Paul's Girls' School. She graduated with a Bachelor of Arts (BA) in Classical History and Archaeology from Lady Margaret Hall, Oxford in 2019 followed by a Master of Studies (MSt) in Greek and Roman History. She completed a second Masters (MA) in the History of Art with a focus on the Italian Renaissance at the Courtauld Institute of Art. She then pursued a PhD at Christ Church, Oxford.

== Career ==
Cargill-Martin briefly appeared in the 2009 BBC film adaptation of The Turn of the Screw as young Ann (portrayed by Michelle Dockery as an adult).

In 2015, the mother–daughter writing duo Honor and Perdita Cargill signed their first book deal with Simon & Schuster Children's for the publication of their young adult (YA) Waiting for Callback series, starting with Casting Queen in 2016. The second installment Take Two followed in 2017.

Cargill-Martin reunited with her mother Perdita in 2021 to co-author Diary of an Accidental Witch, the first in a middle-grade witch school series.

In 2021, Head of Zeus (a Bloomsbury Books imprint) acquired the rights to publish Cargill-Martin's adult non-fiction debut Messalina: Empress, Adulteress, Libertine: The Story of the Most Notorious Woman of the Roman World in 2023. Messalina was shortlisted for Slightly Foxed Best First Biography.

Also in 2023, Cargill-Martin also started the Substack newsletter It's All Ancient History. She has contributed to publications such as The New York Times and Literary Hub and featured in documentaries and History Hit videos.

Moving into children's non-fiction/edutainment, Cargill-Martin signed with Magic Cat Publishing for her children's mythology compilation series She Speaks illustrated by Camelia Pham, starting with The Women of Greek Myths in Their Own Words in 2024, and Hachette Children's Group for the reference books The Six Queens of Henry VIII and Shakespeare's Heroines in 2025, both illustrated by Jaimee Andrews. Cargill-Martin also authored Heroines of the Ancient World for Walker Studios (a Walker Books imprint).

== Personal life ==
Cargill-Martin has dyslexia.

== Bibliography ==
=== Adult non-fiction ===
- Messalina: Empress, Adulteress, Libertine: The Story of the Most Notorious Woman of the Roman World (2023)

=== Children's non-fiction and edutainment ===
==== She Speaks ====
- The Women of Greek Myths in Their Own Words (2024)
- The Women of Norse Myths in their Own Words (2025)

==== Standalones ====
- Heroines of the Ancient World (2025)
- Shakespeare's Heroines: A Guide to the Plays' Leading Ladies (2025)
- The Six Queens of Henry VIII (2026)
- Greek Goddess Diaries (2026)

=== Fiction ===
==== Waiting for Callback (with Perdita Cargill) ====
- Casting Queen (2016)
- Take Two (2017)
- It's a Wrap (2018)

==== Diary of an Accidental Witch (with Perdita Cargill) ====
- Diary of an Accidental Witch (2021)
- Halloween Ball (2023)
- Flying High (2022)
- Ghostly Getaway (2022)
- Unexpected Guests (2023)
- Stage Fright (2023)
- Secret Spells (2024)
- School Trip (2024)
- Magic Ever After (2024)
- Unexpected Visitors (2025)
- Classroom Chaos (2026)
