= Cargill MacMillan =

Cargill MacMillan may refer to:

- Cargill-MacMillan family; U.S. business family
- Cargill MacMillan Jr. (1927–2011) U.S. businessman
- Cargill MacMillan Sr. (1900–1968) U.S. businessman

== See also ==
- Cargill (disambiguation)
- McMillan (disambiguation)
