= Wendy Albiston =

Welsh actress

- Born: 13 January 1969 (age 57); Pontypridd, Wales
- Occupation: Actress
- Years active: 2006–present

Wendy Albiston (born 13 January 1969) is a Welsh actress appearing in several feature films including Swede Caroline (2024), Wonder Woman 1984 (2020) and Transformers: The Last Knight (2017) and TV shows including Coronation Street, After Life, The Alienist and Humans.

In 2002, she played De Chevreuse in the Doctor Who audio drama The Church and the Crown and guest starred in the Sarah Jane Smith adventure The TAO Connection.

Previously, she was probably best known for her role as Guard Miller in the 2006 British-Indian film Provoked and as Martha in the 2008 British television mini-series Sense and Sensibility. Most recently she played Baines the chauffeur in the BBC's The Turn of the Screw (2009). Albiston had small roles in the Bollywood film Jhootha Hi Sahi directed by Abbas Tyrewala and in Five Daughters the BBCs factually-based drama telling the stories of five young women who were murdered in Ipswich in 2006.

Albiston is the younger sister to writer Lesley Ann Albiston.
