= Kargalik =

Kargalık may refer to:

- Kargalık, Korkuteli, a village in Antalya Province, Turkey
- Kargalık, Sarıkaya, a village in Sarıkaya district, Yozgat Province, Turkey
- Kargalık, historic name of two villages, now merged into Corbu, Constanța, Romania

== See also ==
- Kargali (disambiguation)
- Kargilik (disambiguation)
