= Margaret Hale =

- Daniela Denby-Ashe as Margaret
- First appearance: North & South
- Created by: Elizabeth Gaskell
- Portrayed by: Rosalind Shanks, Daniela Denby-Ashe

In-universe information
- Gender: Female
- Title: Miss
- Spouse: John Thornton
- Relatives: Richard Hale (father), Maria Hale (mother), Frederick Hale (brother)

Margaret Hale is the heroine of Elizabeth Gaskell's 1855 novel North and South. Initially, Gaskell wanted the title of the novel to be Margaret Hale, but Charles Dickens, the editor of Household Words, the magazine in which the novel was serialized, insisted on North and South.

== Descriptions ==
From Chapter Two:

- "Margaret was more like him than like her mother. Sometimes people wondered that parents so handsome should have a daughter who was so far from regularly beautiful; not beautiful at all, was occasionally said. Her mouth was wide; no rosebud that could only open just enough to let out a 'yes' and 'no,' and 'an't please you, sir.' But the wide mouth was one soft curve of rich red lips; and the skin, if not white and fair, was of an ivory smoothness and delicacy. If the look on her face was, in general, too dignified and reserved for one so young, now, talking to her father, it was bright as the morning,—full of dimples, and glances that spoke of childish gladness, and boundless hope in the future."

From Chapter Seven:

- "Margaret could not help her looks; but the short curled upper lip, the round, massive up-turned chin, the manner of carrying her head, her movements, full of a soft feminine defiance, always gave strangers the impression of haughtiness."
- "She sat facing [Mr Thornton] and facing the light; her full beauty met his eye; her round white flexile throat rising out of the full, yet lithe figure; her lips, moving so slightly as she spoke, not breaking the cold serene look of her face with any variation from the one lovely haughty curve; her eyes, with their soft gloom, meeting his with quiet maiden freedom."

Margaret was a character created to challenge stereotypes about women's role in the 19th century. The theme of challenging stereotypes is one which is integral throughout the novel.

== Biography ==
Margaret Hale is nineteen years old and before she was 10, lived in Helstone in Hampshire, in the south of England, with her parents—Richard, an Anglican minister, and Maria—and older brother, Frederick. When she was nine years old, Margaret was sent to live in London with her aunt, Mrs. Shaw, and her cousin, Edith. Edith and Margaret were the same age and became fast friends.

Frederick, meanwhile, joined the Royal Navy. Once at sea, he took part in a mutiny against his cruel captain. The Hales realized that Frederick, branded a traitor, would be hanged if he ever returned to England.

When the girls grew up, Edith married Capt. Lennox. Lennox had a younger brother, Henry, who became infatuated with Margaret. She rejected his advances, and chose to move back to Helstone. Mr. Hale, however, had begun to question his faith and the doctrines laid out in the Book of Common Prayer. When asked to renew his vows by the bishop, Mr. Hale could not. Quitting his profession, Mr. Hale moved his wife and daughter to Milton, in the north of England, where he took up work as a tutor.

One of Mr. Hale's pupils is a local mill owner, John Thornton. Margaret takes an instant dislike to Thornton, seeing him as the embodiment of the harsh, working-class north. Margaret, feeling homesick, romanticizes the South. Mr. Thornton, on the other hand, is immediately struck by Margaret. "He did not understand who she was," when he first saw her, "as he caught the simple, straight, unabashed look, which showed that his being there was of no concern to the beautiful countenance, and called up no flush of surprise to the pale ivory of the complexion. He had heard that Mr. Hale had a daughter, but he had imagined that she was a little girl." Margaret eventually comes to feel at home in the north; she makes friends, including Bessy Higgins, a dying young woman.

The workers in all of the mills around Milton are dissatisfied and strike. As the strikers grow desperate, a mob of workers comes to the Thornton's house, where Margaret is calling on Mrs. Thornton, John's mother, and his sister Fanny. Thornton goes out to speak to the rioters at Margaret's behest. Afraid that they will kill him, Margaret rushes out to Thornton. Margaret believes that no one would try to hurt a woman, and throws her arms around Thornton, to protect him. Margaret is mistaken, however. A rock is thrown from the crowd by a "group of lads", and Margaret is knocked out.

Mrs. Thornton, who is wary of Margaret and her son's affection for her, surmises that Margaret acted as she did out of love for Mr. Thornton. She tells her son so, and Thornton proposes to Margaret. Margaret insists that it was her responsibility to save him because she had sent him out to talk to the men, and that she would have done the same thing for any other "poor desperate man in that crowd".

Mrs. Hale, even less happy to be in Milton than Margaret, is dying. She wants to see Frederick one last time, so Margaret secretly writes to him in Spain, where he has been living. Frederick comes to visit the Hales in Milton, and manages to stay hidden before she dies. When Margaret takes Frederick to the train station to get him out of Milton; they are seen by 3 people. The first, Mr. Thornton, sees Margaret with an unknown man "with whom she had stood in an attitude of such familiar confidence". Margaret sees him watching her and spends much of the rest of the novel bearing the guilt of having fallen from Thornton's regard. The other man who sees the Hale siblings is a man named Leonards. He knows that there is a bounty on Frederick's head, and tries to grab him. The two struggle and Leonards is tripped and falls onto the side of the railroad. Fatally injured, he dies the next morning.

There is an inquest into Leonards' death. The third person to see Margaret and her brother, a boy who works at a Milton grocer's, comes forward. He claims to have seen Margaret with the man who fought Leonards. Margaret does not know if her brother is still in the country. Trying to protect Frederick, she denies having been at the train station. Mr. Thornton is a local magistrate, and becomes involved in the case. He knows that Margaret was at the station, but, still in love with her, defends her, taking over the case. Margaret is declared innocent of any involvement in Leonards' death. She knows that Thornton has heard her claiming not to have been at the train station. Margaret is humbled by Thornton's deed and is acutely aware that she must now be accounted as a liar in his eyes.

Margaret and her father slowly begin to recover from Mrs. Hale's death—they are helped by the news of Frederick's safe return to Spain, though not by Bessy's death. Mr Hale receives an invitation to visit an old friend, Mr Bell, in Oxford. Margaret insists that her father go; while there, however, he dies.

Margaret moves back to London, to live with Capt. and Mrs. Lennox. She is unhappy, however, and listless. She spends much time considering the events of the past and longs to set the record straight with Thornton and win back his regard, which she believes is her only hope in repairing the damaged relationship with him. She longs for any word from Milton and, believing that she threw her one chance for happiness in marriage away, she declares to her cousin that she will never marry. She develops a close bond with Edith's young son, Sholto. It is Margaret who disciplines the child, whereas Edith would simply spoil him, and the Lennox family appreciates this—along with their genuine love for Margaret, they encourage her to stay with them. Edith and her mother even hint to Henry to begin wooing Margaret again; they dream of the whole family living together, forever.

She visits Helstone with Mr. Bell and finds herself quite disillusioned with the place she had idealised for so long. Margaret asks Mr. Bell to tell Thornton about Frederick, but Mr. Bell dies before he can do so. He leaves Margaret a legacy which includes Marlborough Mills and the Thornton house.

Meanwhile, Mr. Thornton's cotton business has failed. He is in London to settle his business affairs with his new landlord, Margaret. When Margaret presents Thornton with a generous business proposal that will save the mill, he realises that she is no longer indifferent or antagonistic to him. He again proposes marriage and since she has learned to love him, she accepts.

== Television adaptations ==
North and South has been adapted for the small screen, twice. In 1975, Rosalind Shanks played Margaret. In 2004, Margaret was played by Daniela Denby-Ashe.
