= Kargilik =

Kargilik, sometimes also spelt Karghilik, may refer to:

- Kargilik County (Yecheng) in southern Kashgar Prefecture, Xinjiang Uighur Autonomous Region, China
- Kargilik Town (Yecheng), a city in southern Kashgar Prefecture, Xinjiang Uighur Autonomous Region, China

== See also ==
- Kargalik (disambiguation)
- Kargili (disambiguation)
- Kargil (disambiguation)
