= Cargill (disambiguation) =

Cargill is a privately held American multinational corporation.

Cargill or a variation may also refer to:

== People ==
- Cargill (surname)
- Cargill sept, a sept of the Scottish Clan Drummond
- Cargill Gilston Knott (1856–1922), Scottish physicist
- Cargill MacMillan (disambiguation), multiple people
- Lord Drummond of Cargill

== Places ==
- Cargill, Ontario, Canada, a village
- Mount Cargill, a volcanic outcrop in New Zealand

== Organizations ==
- Cargills (Ceylon), Sri Lankan conglomerate
  - Cargills Bank, a bank in Sri Lanka

== Facilities and structures ==
- Cargill's Castle, ruins in New Zealand's southern city of Dunedin
- Cargill House, Lima, Livingston, New York State, USA; an NRHP-listed building
- Walter Hurt Cargill House, Columbus, Georgia, USA; an NRHP-listed building
- Cargill railway station, Perth and Kinross, Scotland, UK; a former station in Perthshire
- Cargill's Corner, a major intersection in South Dunedin, New Zealand
- Cargills Square, Jaffna, Sri Lanka, a shopping mall

== Other uses ==
- Cargill Creek, Bahamas
- Cargill Falls, Quinebaug River, Putnam, Windham, Connecticut, USA
- Cargill High School, Invercargill, Southland, South Island, New Zealand
- Cargill Open Plan School, Tokoroa, Waikato, North Island, New Zealand; a primary school

== See also ==
- Kargil (disambiguation)
- Scargill (disambiguation)
