= Kargalı =

Kargalı (literally "(place) with crows") is a Turkish place name that may refer to the following places in Turkey:

- Kargalı, Besni, a village in the district of Besni, Adıyaman Province
- Kargalı, Polatlı, a village in the district of Polatlı, Ankara Province

== See also ==
- Kargalik (disambiguation)
- Kargili (disambiguation)
