= Before the Race =

Painting by Edgar Degas

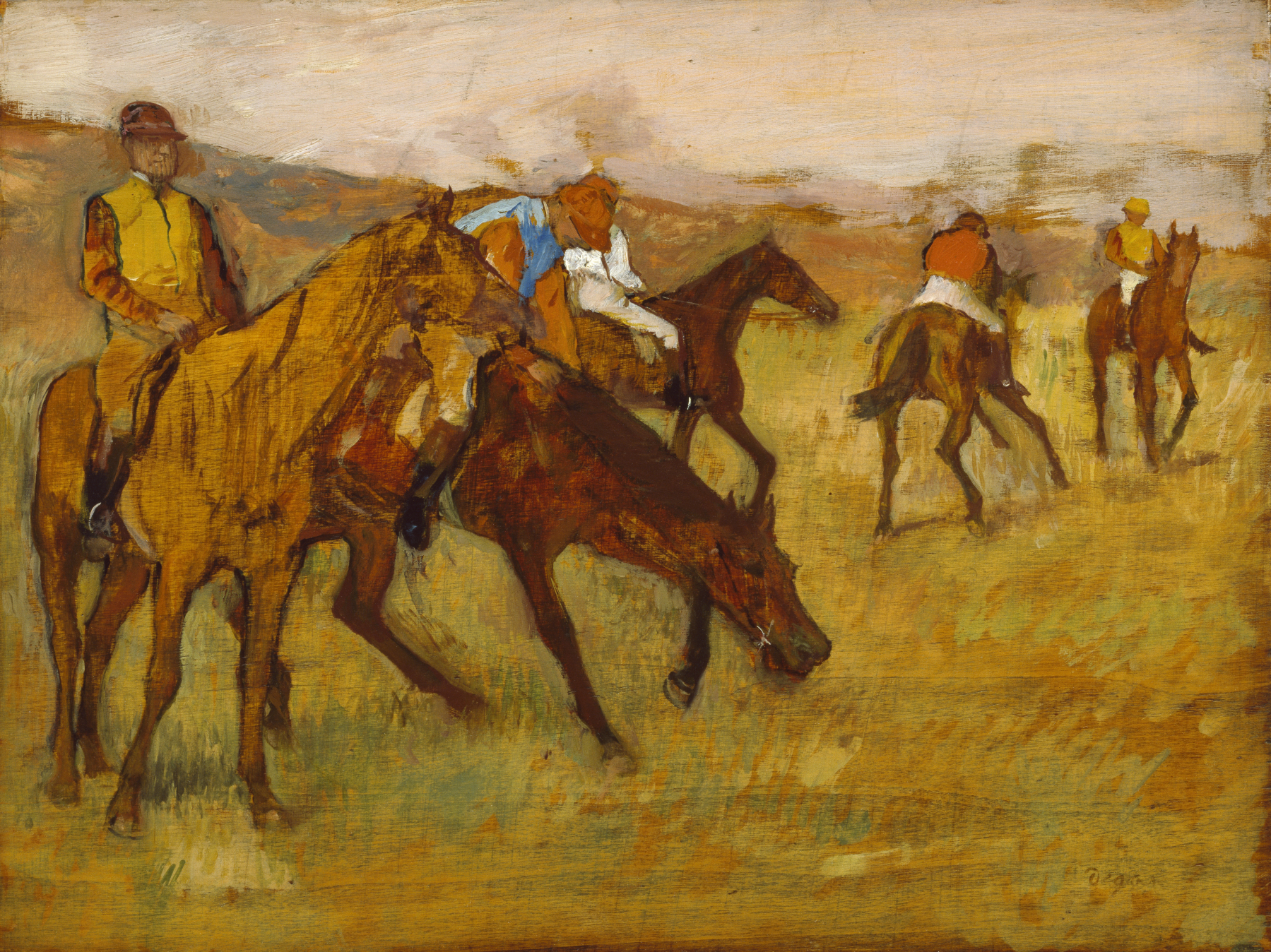
- Artist: Edgar Degas
- Year: 1882–1884
- Medium: Oil on panel
- Dimensions: 26.4 cm × 34.9 cm (10.4 in × 13.7 in)
- Location: The Walters Art Museum, Baltimore

Before the Race is an oil on panel painting by French Impressionist painter Edgar Degas, from 1882-1884. He had began painting scenes with horses in the 1860s.

== History ==
Horse racing became a popular pastime in 19th century France under Louis Philippe I and Napoleon III. Degas began admiring horses while visiting friends in Normandy. Over the course of his career it is reported that he created 45 oils, 20 pastels, 250 drawings, and 17 sculptures related to horses. Degas was eager to know horses in anatomical detail. As a student, Degas had filled his notebooks with drawings of horses. During a tour of breeding farms with Paul Valpincon and after exposure to horse races, Degas appreciated the movement of the horses and the colors of the jockeys uniforms. He wanted to make his paintings seem spontaneous as if he'd captured a passing moment. Before the Race is one of three identically titled paintings from the early 1880s. One was purchased in 1881 by David W. T. Cargill through Alexander Reid (who was dealer for much of Degas' work) for £2100.

During this time Degas was reported to have a full sized stuffed horse in his studio. This version is part of the collection of The Walters Art Museum, the other two are part of the collections of the Clark Art Institute and the Mrs. John Hay Whitney Collection.

== Analysis ==
Of the three versions, the Walters' painting most closely resembles a sketch. The setting of the painting is barely suggested and the pigments are thinly applied.

== Off the Wall ==
A reproduction of Before the Race was featured in Off the Wall, an open-air exhibition on the streets of Baltimore, Maryland in 2013/2014. It was displayed at the Horse You Came in on Saloon. The original is part of The Walters Art Museum collection. The National Gallery in London began the concept of bringing art out of doors in 2007 and the Detroit Institute of Art introduced the concept in the U.S.. The Off the Wall reproductions of the Walters' paintings are done on weather-resistant vinyl and include a description of the painting and a QR code for smart phones.
