= Mark Umbers =

English film, television and theatre actor

- Born: 17 June 1973 (age 53); Harrogate, North Yorkshire, England
- Education: Malsis School; Sedbergh School
- Alma mater: Oxford University
- Occupation: Actor
- Years active: 1995–present

Mark Umbers (born 17 June 1973) is an English theatre, film and television actor.

== Early life and education ==
Born in Harrogate, North Yorkshire, Umbers was brought up in Wetherby and was educated at Malsis School before attending Sedbergh School. In 1995 he graduated from Oxford University with a degree in Latin and Greek literature and philosophy.

== Career ==
Umbers' first professional engagements were in 1997 in the BBC dramas The Student Prince and Berkeley Square. His theatre debut was the lead role in a production of The Pirates of Penzance which transferred to Regent's Park Open Air Theatre in London.

Trevor Nunn and John Caird cast Umbers in their multi-award-winning 1999 season at the Royal National Theatre, where he appeared in productions including The Merchant of Venice, which was later filmed for broadcast by the BBC. After playing Lord Sidney opposite Richard E. Grant in the BBC series The Scarlet Pimpernel, Umbers returned to the National to play Freddy in the acclaimed 2001 revival of My Fair Lady, later transferring to Theatre Royal Drury Lane. In her Evening Standard review, Zoe Williams suggested that Umbers was ‘known throughout the western world as the most beautiful man ever seen’.

In 2002 Umbers appeared alongside Chiwetel Ejiofor in The Vortex, Michael Grandage's inaugural production at the Donmar Warehouse.

In 2004, he was cast opposite Scarlett Johansson in A Good Woman.

In 2005, he played the lead role of Perkin Warbeck in Channel 4's historical drama Princes in the Tower. After playing opposite Anjelica Huston and Lauren Bacall in These Foolish Things, his third role that year was alongside John Malkovich in Colour Me Kubrick. He then played Lt. Robert Maynard in the mini-series Blackbeard (2006) opposite Jessica Chastain.

In 2007, Umbers played the Gentleman Caller in The Glass Menagerie alongside Jessica Lange in the West End to critical acclaim. Later that year Steven Soderbergh cast Umbers as Roth in Che: Part Two. The following year, he starred in the second series of the BBC drama Mistresses and the BBC film of The Turn of the Screw, playing the Master opposite Michelle Dockery.

The Menier Chocolate Factory cast Umbers in their revival of Sweet Charity, the first production of the show to have only one leading man, with Umbers playing all the love-interest roles. The production transferred to the Theatre Royal Haymarket in 2010. Of Umbers' performance, Michael Coveney wrote in The Independent that "it's unusual to have such a level of performance in a musical...and it raises everyone else's game."

After appearing in the ITV drama Eternal Law, in 2011 Umbers played Frank Hunter in The Browning Version opposite Anna Chancellor at Chichester Festival Theatre. The play was performed in a double bill with David Hare's new play South Downs and transferred to the Harold Pinter Theatre in London in April 2012.

Umbers returned to the Menier Chocolate Factory in November 2012, to play the central role of Franklin Shepard in Maria Friedman's multi-award-winning revival of Stephen Sondheim's Merrily We Roll Along. The production transferred with its original cast to the Harold Pinter Theatre on 1 May 2013, receiving (at that time) more 5 star reviews than any other production in West End history, along with the Critics' Circle Award for Best Musical, the Evening Standard Award for Best Musical and the Olivier Award for Best Musical revival. The production was filmed and subsequently screened in cinemas worldwide.

Between 2014 and 2016, Umbers played Wing Commander Nick Lucas in the ITV and PBS World War Two drama Home Fires. After playing the lead role of Georg in She Loves Me at the Menier Chocolate Factory in 2016, he played Robert Walsh in David Hare's Netflix series Collateral alongside Carey Mulligan.

In August 2017, he reprised his role as Franklin Shepard in Merrily We Roll Along for Huntington Theatre Company in Boston, again directed by Friedman. The Boston Globe described his performance as "simply extraordinary". HuffPost cited Stephen Sondheim as having said that Umbers was the best in the role that he had ever seen. Ben Brantley wrote in the New York Times: "For the first time in my experience, Frank is the beating, shattered heart of the show...a consequence Mr. Umbers’s startlingly sympathetic performance of a (usually unsympathetic) man to whom fame happens."

Umbers played Roger Moore in the HBO Hervé Villechaize biopic My Dinner with Hervé. Umbers and Peter Dinklage recreated the fight scene between James Bond and villain Nick Nack from The Man with the Golden Gun for the film.

As of 2023, Umbers is currently playing Cecil Ainsworth in the ITV drama Hotel Portofino.

== Filmography ==
=== Film ===
| Year | Title | Role | Notes |
|---|---|---|---|
| 1998 | Love Is the Devil: Study for a Portrait of Francis Bacon | PC Denham | |
| 2004 | A Good Woman | Robert Windemere | |
| 2005 | Colour Me Kubrick | Piers | |
| 2005 | These Foolish Things | Douglas Middleton | |
| 2013 | Merrily We Roll Along | Franklin Shepard | Film recording of the musical |
| 2017 | King Arthur: Legend of the Sword | Baron #2 | |
| 2020 | Dolittle | Lieutenant | |

=== Television ===
| Year | Title | Role | Notes |
|---|---|---|---|
| 1997 | The Prince of Hearts | Elliot | Television movie |
| 1998 | Silent Witness | Male Student | Episodes: "An Academic Exercise: Parts 1 & 2" |
| 1998 | Berkeley Square | Sidney Chambers | Episode: "Gone a'Hunting" |
| 1998 | Casualty | Nick Worthington | Episodes: "Internal Inferno: Parts 1 & 2" |
| 1999 | The Bill | David Webster | Episode: "Long Term Investment" |
| 2000 | Trust | Simon | Television movie |
| 2000 | The Scarlet Pimpernel | Lord Sidney | Episode: "A Good Name" |
| 2001 | Masterpiece Theatre | Solanio | Episode: "The Merchant of Venice" |
| 2003 | Foyle's War | Rex Talbot | Episode: "Among the Few" |
| 2004 | Midsomer Murders | Neville Williams | Episode: "Sins of Commission" |
| 2005 | Princes in the Tower | Perkin Warbeck | Television movie |
| 2006 | Pirates:The True Story of Blackbeard | Lt. Robert Maynard | 3 episodes Television miniseries |
| 2007 | Heartbeat | Jimbo Brady | Episode: "Out of Africa" |
| 2008 | Midsomer Murders | Harry Fitzroy | Episode: "Blood Wedding" |
| 2008 | Harley Street | James Davison | Episode: #1.4 |
| 2009 | Mistresses | Dan Tate | 6 episodes |
| 2009 | The Turn of the Screw | Master | Television movie |
| 2012 | Eternal Law | Major John Parker | 2 episodes |
| 2014 | Agatha Christie: Ordeal by Innocence | Calgary | 3 episodes Television miniseries |
| 2015–2016 | Home Fires | Nick Lucas | 11 episodes |
| 2018 | Collateral | Robert Walsh | 2 episodes Television miniseries |
| 2018 | My Dinner with Hervé | Roger Moore | Television movie |
| 2019 | Father Brown | Nicholai Solovey | Episode: "The Honourable Thief" |
| 2020 | Grantchester | Wyatt Rogers | Episode: #5.3 |
| 2020 | Brave New World | Warden Cortez | Episode: "Want & Consequence" |
| 2022 | Hotel Portofino | Cecil Ainsworth | Main role |
