= Ring Around the Bath =

UK radio program

- Genre: Domestic comedy
- Running time: 30 minutes
- Country of origin: United Kingdom
- Language: English
- Home station: BBC Radio 4
- Starring: Duncan Preston; Penny Downie; Claudie Blakley; Bruce Mackinnon; Daniela Denby-Ashe; Catherine Shepherd; Pippa Haywood
- Written by: Lucy Clare; Ian Davidson
- Produced by: Elizabeth Freestone
- Original release: 8 August 2003 – 6 February 2006
- No. of series: 3
- No. of episodes: 18
- Audio format: Stereophonic sound
- Website: Ring Around the Bath at BBC Radio 4

Ring Around the Bath is a domestic situation comedy series broadcast on BBC Radio 4 between 2003 and 2006. It was written by Lucy Clare and Ian Davidson and produced by Elizabeth Freestone.

== Cast ==
- Duncan Preston as Patrick Bartholomew
- Penny Downie (Series 1 and 2) / Pippa Haywood (Series 3) as Stella Bartholomew
- Claudie Blakley as Alison Bartholomew
- Bruce Mackinnon as Rick Bartholomew
- Daniela Denby-Ashe as Egg Bartholomew
- Catherine Shepherd as Xanthe

== Situation ==
Stella Bartholomew is a middle-aged mother with a job in a garden centre. She hopes her adult children will move out of their chaotic suburban home so she and her husband can retire to the country. Her cookery-expert husband, Patrick, and the children are much less keen on the idea. Oldest daughter Alison is approaching thirty and works as an estate agent. Son Rick is unable to hold down a steady job. Rick's naïve but eager to help girlfriend Xanthe lives with them. The youngest in the family, Egg, is studying for A-levels.

== Episodes ==
=== Series One ===
No. overall	No. in series	Title	Original release date
1	1	"Return of the Kidi"	8 August 2003
Stella is struggling with the stress of a full house as eldest daughter Alison moves back home. Husband Patrick attempts to talk to the kids about their futures, however, Rick and Xanthe's move out to her parents doesn't last long.
2	2	"Rick's Quarrel"	15 August 2003
Alison has broken up with her boyfriend and returns home upset with men. Xanthe is also having difficulties with Rick, and with a little interference and advice from Alison, ends up moving out herself.
3	3	"Pregnancy"	22 August 2003
Stella finds a positive pregnancy test, and begins to speculate on which of Xanthe, Alison or Egg is pregnant. Various misunderstandings however mean that the kids think Stella might be having another child.
4	4	"Car Boot"	29 August 2003
Patrick decides on hosting a car boot sale to fund a potential retirement move to France, and the potential earnings mean the kids are willing to help out, however things don't go to plan in managing to get rid of items.
5	5	"The Older Man"	5 September 2003
Alison surprisingly takes to cleaning the house, and it is soon revealed that she has a new partner. However, to the families shock he is significantly older, though on meeting him, he is well liked by everyone.
6	6	"New House"	12 September 2003
Egg has a school friend guest, Digger, over to help her out with her history homework. Contributing to the household bedlam, he becomes ill with the flu and has to be looked after.

=== Series Two ===
No. overall	No. in series	Title	Original release date
7	1	"New Ways to Comb Old Gravel"	1 November 2004
Patrick focuses on writing a children's cookbook while Alison returns from living in Spain having broken up with her boyfriend. Egg receives her exam results, while Stella tries to improve herself by doing a landscaping course.
8	2	"Go With the Flow"	8 November 2004
Rick has a new job delivering vegetables, however ends up running a stall at a farmers market. Egg has also come into money in secretive circumstances, and Alison loses a job as a childminder.
9	3	"Brideshead Unvisited"	15 November 2004
Alison is a bridesmaid for Rick's former girlfriend who is getting married and the whole family is invited. As Xanthe worries about Rick's feelings to the marriage, Rick leaves her with the impression they are engaged.
10	4	"Space Perception"	22 November 2004
Still planning on a move to the country, Stella tries to improve relations with the neighbours to ensure they do not scupper any house sale. Egg is also being taught how to cook by Patrick in preparation for university.
11	5	"The Birds and the Bees"	29 November 2004
Alison breaks up with Rory, however he is well liked by the family who decide to remain friends with him despite Alison's protests. Xanthe gets a job as a teaching assistant, and Stella brings home a beehive.
12	6	"All Over Bar the Wrapping Paper"	6 December 2004
Christmas has arrived and Patrick attempts to buy a potting shed for Stella, who would much rather move house. However, changes to the usual festivities leave Alison, Rick and Egg upset.

=== Series Three ===
No. overall	No. in series	Title	Original release date
13	1	"Love in a Cottage"	2 January 2006
Alison has moved out again to live with her new boyfriend, while Xanthe and Rick have new jobs. The family takes to spending large amounts of time visiting Alison, before Patrick treats Stella to a stay in a country cottage.
14	2	"Willing It Away"	9 January 2006
Patrick gets a job hosting a cooking show on the Barbecue Channel. Rick and Xanthe decide to get engaged, though the engagement doesn't last long due to Rick's inability to make a decision. Alison also drops the news she is pregnant.
15	3	"The Loophole of Opportunity"	16 January 2006
Egg takes to Fergus, the director of Patrick's cooking show. Alison finds a house to move into with her partner, though arguments over furniture cause problems. Stella jumps at the chance to go house-hunting in the country.
16	4	"Keeping Mum"	23 January 2006
Patrick plans a surprise party for Stella's upcoming birthday. However, the plans are complicated by the fact that Stella doesn't want any fuss, and the scheme is almost ruined when Stella becomes upset at the lack of fuss.
17	5	"Pressure Times Volume is a Constant"	30 January 2006
An environmentalist guest, Dominic, moves in meaning even more congestion in the household. Patrick buys a larger car, and Rick moves into a flat due to being repeatedly late for work.
18	6	"Seeking Lost Gardens"	6 February 2006
Stella runs an open garden with fiery results, while Patrick attempts to book a trip for himself and Stella to Scotland. However, travel plans are disrupted when Alison goes into labour.

== Broadcast History ==
Three series of the show have been broadcast, each with six half-hour episodes. The first series was aired in August and September 2003. The show returned for a second series in November and December 2004. The final series was aired in January and February 2006.

Repeat airings have been made on BBC Radio 7 and BBC Radio 4 Extra.

== Critical Reaction ==
The Guardian found it "tightly scripted" and "horribly realistic".
