= Scargill (disambiguation) =

Arthur Scargill (born 1938) is a British politician and former miners' trade union leader.

Scargill may also refer to:

- Wayne Scargill (born 1968), English former professional footballer
- William Pitt Scargill (1787-1836), English Unitarian minister and writer
- Scargill, County Durham, a hamlet in England
- Scargill, New Zealand, see Hurunui District#Populated places
- Scargill House, a Christian conference centre run by the Scargill Movement
