= David Sime Cargill =

Scottish businessman (1826 – 1904)

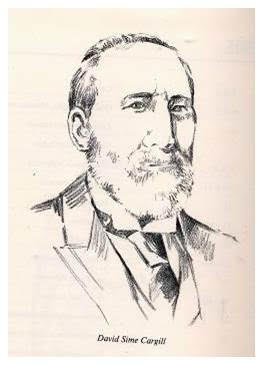
- David Sime Cargill
- Born: April 1826
- Died: May 1904 (aged 78)
- Occupation: Businessman

David Sime Cargill (9 April 1826 – 25 May 1904) was a Scottish businessman. He was the founder of Burmah Oil which expanded to become one of the United Kingdom's largest oil companies.

== Biography ==
He was born on 9 April 1826, in Maryton, near Montrose, to James Cargill and his wife, Helen Thomson.

Cargill briefly worked in Glasgow at the offices of the East India merchants William Milne & Co for whom, in 1844, he set sail for Ceylon to establish a branch of the company there. He became a local partner in Colombo in 1850. In 1861, Cargill returned to Glasgow to acquire the whole business which carried on an extensive trade with India as well as Ceylon. He remained chairman of Cargills in Ceylon until his death in 1904.

In 1872, he became a director of the Glasgow-based Rangoon Oil Company engaged in marketing oil products. Four years later he bought it outright and invested further funds but it was up against the monopoly of the Kingdom of Upper Burma which controlled oil exploration. It was in 1886 that Cargill obtained exploration rights, as well as improving refining methods in Rangoon, and he founded Burmah Oil Ltd that year. David Sime Cargill greatly expanded business, eventually supplying 100% of Burma's oil and by-product requirements and 13% of India's kerosene requirements. He continued as chairman until his death in 1904 at home in Carruth, Bridge of Weir.

Cargill was also a director of the Merchants House of Glasgow, and of Glasgow Chamber of Commerce. He was a patron of the arts and became president of the city's Royal Institute of Fine Arts.

He died in Kilmacolm, on 25 May 1904, aged 78, and is buried with his first wife Margaret in the Glasgow Necropolis. Despite his wealth he has a small simple gravestone.

== Family ==
He married Margaret Traill of Arbroath in 1861 and together they went on to have three sons and two daughters. Margaret died giving birth to David William Traill Cargill in 1872.

He married again in 1878 to Connel Elizabeth Auld and together they had one son and one daughter. His second son, John, succeeded him as chairman of Burmah Oil.
