= Daniela Denby-Ashe =

British actress of Polish descent (born 1978)

- Born: Daniela Jolanta Denby-Ashe; 9 August 1978 (age 48); London, England
- Occupation: Actress
- Years active: 1992–present
- Notable work: North and South (2004); My Family (2000–2011)

Daniela Jolanta Denby-Ashe (born 9 August 1978) is an English actress. She is best known for playing Sarah Hills on the soap opera EastEnders, Margaret Hale on the period drama North and South, and Janey Harper on the BBC sitcom My Family. She also played Jem Allen (Series 4) and Lorraine Donnegan (Series 7–8) on the drama series Waterloo Road.

== Early life ==
Denby-Ashe was born in North West London on 9 August 1978, the daughter of Polish immigrants; her father's original name was Miroslaw Pszkit. Before her parents married, they decided to adopt a more British-sounding surname, so they each chose a surname they liked from the telephone directory and hyphenated them. Denby-Ashe is fluent in English, Polish, and French, learning the latter from her grandmother, who was raised in France until World War II broke out. She began studying ballet at the age of two and tap at a later stage; from the ages of 10 to 16, she attended several drama schools, including the Corona Academy.

== Career ==
Denby-Ashe first gained film experience on the children's video Nursery Rhymes 2 from Pickwick Video. She appeared in many television commercials as a child actor which then led on to children's drama such as Kevin & Co, as well as the Channel 4 sitcom Desmond's. Denby-Ashe also appeared briefly alongside Jennifer Saunders and Julia Sawalha in season 3 episode 6 of Absolutely Fabulous. Her big break came in 1995 when she landed the role of Sarah Hills in the BBC soap opera EastEnders. She played this character until 1999.

The following year she got the role of Janey Harper in the BBC sitcom My Family. Daniela took a break from My Family for the fourth series in 2003, but returned to the role in 2004. The eleventh and final series first aired on BBC One from June 2011.

In 2004 she took the lead role of Margaret Hale in the BBC TV drama adaptation of Elizabeth Gaskell's North & South, and in 2006 played Mary in the science fiction TV series Torchwood episode Greeks Bearing Gifts. Her other television roles include Office Gossip, Rescue Me, Is Harry on the Boat? and The Afternoon Play. From 2003 she appeared in the Radio 4 comedy Ring Around the Bath.

In 2007, she starred as Robert Maxwell's secretary in Maxwell, a BBC drama about his life.

In December 2008 she appeared in BBC Four's supernatural drama series Crooked House, and in October 2010 she starred in an episode of the ITV detective drama Midsomer Murders. In April 2009 she appeared in the fourth series of the BBC drama Waterloo Road as deceitful supply teacher, Jem Allen. In April 2012, she returned to the drama as a new regular character, Lorraine Donegan. The character then appeared regularly throughout the eighth series.

She appeared in two episodes of the BBC sitcom Mum in 2019.

== Filmography ==
Year	Title	Role	Notes
1992	Desmond's	Jackie	Episode: "Growing Pains"
1992	Kevin and Co	Sophie Coe	6 episodes
1993-1995	The Bill	Various	3 episodes
1995	Crimewatch UK		Episode: "May 1995"
1995	Absolutely Fabulous	Victoria	Episode: "The End"
1995–1999	EastEnders	Sarah Hills	276 episodes
1999	Molly	Mary	Television film
2000	Fish	Jess Taylor	6 episodes
2000–2002, 2004–2011	My Family	Janey Harper	94 episodes
2001	Is Harry on the Boat?	Lorraine	Television film
2001	Office Gossip	Cheryl	6 episodes
2002	Rescue Me	Julie Carter	Episode: "Gone Away"
2003	The Afternoon Play	Kate	Episode: "Girls' Weekend"
2004	North & South	Margaret Hale	All episodes
2006	The Family Man	Kelly	Film
2006	Torchwood	Mary	Episode: "Greeks Bearing Gifts"
2007	Maxwell	Andrea Martin	Television film
2008	Crooked House	Hannah	2 episodes
2009	Waterloo Road	Jem Allen	Series 4, Episode 16
2010	Midsomer Murders	Camilla Farquaharson	Episode: "The Noble Art"
2012–2013	Waterloo Road	Lorraine Donnegan	30 episodes
2016	Silent Witness	Julia Lubas	Episode: "In Plain Sight" (2 parts)
2017	Heidi: Queen of the Mountain	Gertrude	Film, Director: Bhavna Talwar
2019	Mum	Claire	Series 3; 2 episodes
2019–2020	101 Dalmatian Street	Snowball (voice)	
2020	Into the Night	Sylvie Dubois	English voice
2022	Colin and Justin’s Hotel Hell	Narrator	4 episodes
