= Kargil (film) =

2018 Tamil film

- Theatrical release poster
- Directed by: Sivaani Senthil
- Written by: Sivaani Senthil
- Produced by: Subha Senthil
- Starring: Jishnu Menon
- Cinematography: Ganesh Paramahamsa
- Edited by: Abinath
- Music by: Vignesh Pai
- Production company: Sivaani Studios
- Release date: 22 June 2018
- Running time: 103 minutes
- Country: India
- Language: Tamil

Kargil is a 2018 Indian Tamil-language romantic drama film directed by Sivaani Senthil and produced by Subha Senthil, starring Jishnu Menon in the lead role. The film released on 22 June 2018. It is one of the only Tamil-language films that features one character throughout the film.

== Plot ==
Kargil is a war not between two countries but between two hearts. Arjun (Jishnu Menon), an IT professional, romances with his lover Maha, who fights more, which Arjun treats as his love. Maha informs about her father, who travels from the US next week, and asks Arjun to receive him, impress him, and get permission for marriage. Arjun accept that with a smile and says he will marry Maha immediately as Tatkal marriage once his father arrives. On that day, Arjun travels alone from Chennai to Bangalore in his car without receiving her father, and Maha as usual gets angry with him and disconnects the mobile. Throughout the film, Arjun travels alone in his car and speaks in the speakerphone with all the other characters. Along with Maha, the trouble arises from Sindhu, his ex-lover and current MD, boss Kings, missed call Beep Sahayam, Inspector Vincent, and US return Aadhi. Finally, Arjun resolves his problems, believes in his love, states that his trust is his love, and finally impresses Maha's father and convinces her.

== Cast ==
- Jishnu Menon as Arjun

Voice cast

- Prarna Sathani as Maha
- Iswarya as Sindu
- Akan Jayabalan as Senthil Maams
- Nivin Sahaya as Sahayam
- Kartikeyan as Vincent
- Sivaani Senthil as Kings
- Meiyappan as Sathyan
- Harish as Aadhi
- Abinath as Pandi
- Renuka as Nancy

== Production ==
The film stars one person for much of the film and bears no relationship to the Kargil war. Other than a brief scene involving the heroine, the rest of the film features one character who is travelling a car.

== Release ==
Deccan Chronicle gave the film a rating of two out of five stars and noted that "After a point, the film becomes monotonous. Shivaani’s idea is laudable, but had he concentrated on infusing few more interesting elements, it would have made the right impact". The Times of India gave the film the same rating and stated "Kudos to Sivaani for choosing an interesting concept to debut with, but he should really have spent some more time in fine-tuning the script". Cinema Express gave the film a rating of one out of five stars and wrote that "The only saving grace comes in the form of the humour portions involving a wrong call from someone named Beep Sagayam".
