= Sandy Welch =

British television writer and screenwriter

- Born: Sandra Elizabeth Welch; 6 December 1953 (age 72); Chester, Cheshire, England
- Education: National Film and Television School
- Occupations: Television writer, screenwriter
- Years active: 1981–present
- Spouse: Stephen Poliakoff (m. 1983)
- Children: 2

Sandra Elizabeth "Sandy" Welch (born 6 December 1953 in Chester, Cheshire) is a British television writer and screenwriter.

== Career ==
As a screenwriter, Welch has developed many serials for the BBC, including The Magnificent 7, adaptations of Charles Dickens' novel Our Mutual Friend and Elizabeth Gaskell's North and South, and the well-received 2006 interpretation of Charlotte Brontë's Jane Eyre. In 2009 Welch adapted Emma by Jane Austen and The Turn of the Screw for the BBC.

Welch won a BAFTA in 1999 for "Best Drama Serial" Our Mutual Friend, the award was shared with Catherine Wearing and Julian Farino. She was also nominated for the Edgar Award for "Best Television Feature or Miniseries" A Dark Adapted Eye in 1996 and nominated for an Emmy Award for "Outstanding Writing for a Miniseries, Movie or a Dramatic Special" for Jane Eyre in 2007.

== Personal life ==
Welch is a graduate of the National Film and Television School.

Welch married television dramatist Stephen Poliakoff. The couple have two children.
