= Kargili =

Kargili may be:

- the adjective form of the name of Kargil, a town in Ladakh, India
- Kargılı, the name of several villages in Turkey:
  - Kargılı, Tarsus, in Mersin Province
  - Kargılı, Tekkeköy, in Tekkeköy, Samsun Province
  - Kargılı, Bozova, in Bozova, Şanlıurfa Province

== See also ==
- Kargali (disambiguation)
- Kargilik (disambiguation)
