= Burmah Oil Company =

British oil company

- Type: Public
- Industry: Petroleum
- Founded: 1886
- Defunct: 2000
- Fate: Purchased by BP Amoco in 2000
- Successor: BP
- Headquarters: Glasgow, Scotland
- Subsidiaries: Anglo-Persian Oil Company; Castrol

The Burmah Oil Company was a leading British oil company which was once a constituent of the FTSE 100 Index. In 1966, Castrol was acquired by Burmah, which was renamed Burmah-Castrol. BP Amoco purchased the company in 2000.

== History ==
House flag used by Burmah Oil Company

The company was founded in Glasgow in 1886 by David Sime Cargill, an East India merchant, to succeed his Rangoon Oil Company Ltd, also of Glasgow, to further expand and develop oil fields in the Indian subcontinent. On his death in 1904, the ownership and chairmanship passed to his son John Cargill.

In the 1900s, the Admiralty was planning a changeover from coal to fuel oil for powering the engines of its warships. In 1905, Burmah signed a contract with the Admiralty to supply naval fuel oil from Rangoon.

In the first decade of the 20th century, Burmah Oil founded Anglo-Persian Oil Company to succeed the early prospecting in Persia of William Knox D'Arcy with Burmah Oil owning 97%. Burmah Oil became the largest oil company in the British Empire. The subsidiary was later renamed Anglo-Iranian Oil Company and eventually BP.

In 1938, Burmah Oil was the subject of a major nationalist protest and general strike in British Burma, known as the 1300 Revolution. Burmah Oil ultimately conceded a few terms, but the strike ended mostly out of fatigue.

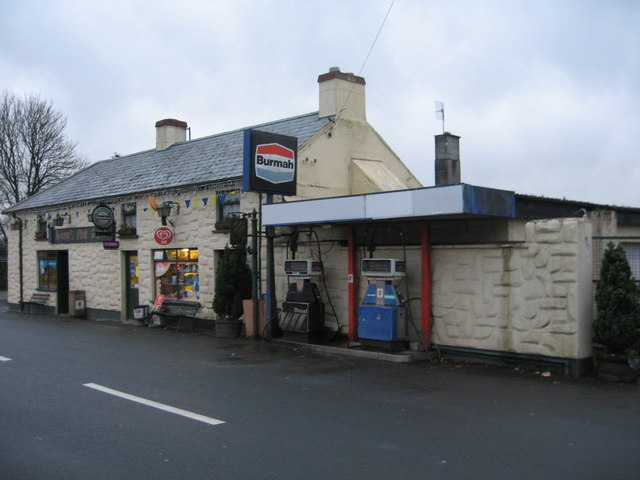
Burmah petrol station in Ireland

For about a century, the company played a major role in the oil industry, and in the discovery of oil in the Middle East through its significant influence over British Petroleum. It marketed itself under the BOC brand in Burma, Bangladesh (formerly East Pakistan) and Assam (in India), and through a joint venture Burmah-Shell with Shell in the rest of India.

Until 1901, when the Standard Oil Company started operations in Burma, Burmah Oil enjoyed a monopoly in the region. The company operated in Burma until 1963, when Ne Win nationalized all industries in the country. Out of the nationalized assets of Burmah Oil, the Myanma Oil and Gas Enterprise was created.

The company was involved in a landmark legal case in 1964, Burmah Oil Co. v Lord Advocate, concerning compensation for the destruction of oil fields in Burma by British forces in 1942 to avoid them falling into the hands of the invading Japanese army, winning a 3–2 decision in the Judicial Committee of the House of Lords, but the effect of this was specifically reversed by the War Damage Act 1965.

In 1963, the company left Burma and undertook new exploration in India, Pakistan, Bangladesh, Australasia, the Americas, Canada and the North Sea until 1986. In 1966, Burmah acquired Castrol, renaming it Burmah-Castrol.

The Bank of England came to the rescue of Burmah Oil after the company made large losses on its tanker fleets in 1974. The core of the rescue operation was the provision of a year's grace so that the company could become smaller and more viable. The Bank of England also agreed to guarantee $650 million of the company's foreign currency borrowings.

In 2000, Burmah-Castrol was acquired by BP Amoco.
