= John Cargill Thompson =

Scottish dramatist

John Cargill Thompson (1 November 1938 – 13 September 2000) was a Scottish dramatist specialising in one-person plays. After the performance of his 52nd play, he was described as "Britain's most prolific playwright", surpassing Shakespeare's 37 and Alan Ayckbourn's 51.

== Biography ==
He was born in Burma on 1 November 1938, but brought up in Glasgow. He was educated at Glasgow High School and the Royal Scottish Academy of Music and Drama. He taught in the Drama Department of University College of North Wales, Bangor, and was senior lecturer in acting at the School of Theatre, Manchester Polytechnic, before giving up teaching to write full-time.

Many of his plays were based on the 18th-century dramatists and actors about whom he had taught. He had several successes at the Edinburgh Festival Fringe, notably a double Fringe First Award in 1992 for Shylock Triumphant and Every Inch a King, about Charles Macklin and David Garrick respectively. His record-breaking 52nd play was Soul Doubt, staged in Hampstead's New End Theatre in 1997.

He collected the works of G. A. Henty and wrote The Boys' Dumas, G. A. Henty: Aspects of Victorian Publishing (1975).

A profile in February 1997 described his central London flat as " ... a haven of eccentricity. The kitchen is a Bohemian nightmare where dirty dishes, bottles of whisky and gin, and tubes of toothpaste vie for space," and said that he was then working on a play "which has the goddess Juno being interviewed by Hello! magazine." He was married twice, first to Sheila, with whom he had daughters — Perdita and Lilith — and then to Dorothea, with whom he had daughters Jessica and Nerissa.

He died in Edinburgh on 19 September 2000, aged 61.

His sister was Helen Cargill Thompson, a librarian and art collector.

== Selected works ==
=== Plays ===
- Macbeth Speaks, based on Macbeth, King of Scots
- An English Education, about James I, King of Scots
- The Actor's Apology, based on an incident when George Frederick Cooke was required to apologise to an audience for his drunkenness
- Shylock Triumphant, about Charles Macklin
- Every Inch a King, about David Garrick
- When the Rain Stops, the tale of Mrs Noah
- ... and many more

=== Books ===
- The boys' Dumas, G. A. Henty: aspects of Victorian publishing (Carcanet, 1975, ISBN 9780856351440)
- An introduction to fifty British plays, 1660-1900 (Pan Books, 1979) (also published by Heinemann as A reader's guide to fifty British plays, 1660-1900, 1980, ISBN 043518881X)
