= Sir John Cargill, 1st Baronet =

Scottish oil magnate (1867 – 1954)

Sir John Cargill Bt DL JP

Chairman of the Burmah Oil Company
- In office 1904–1943

Personal details
- Born: John Traill Cargill; 10 January 1867 Glasgow, Scotland
- Died: 24 January 1954 (aged 87) Edinburgh, Scotland
- Occupation: Businessman

Sir John Traill Cargill, 1st Baronet, DL, JP (10 January 1867 – 24 January 1954) was a Scottish oil magnate.

== Early life and career ==
Cargill was born in Glasgow, the second son of David Sime Cargill, founder of the Burmah Oil Company, and his first wife Margaret (née Traill), who died when he was five. He was educated at Glasgow Academy from 1878 to 1883, and in 1890 went to Burma to work in the Rangoon office of his father's company, returning to Glasgow three years later.

== Later career ==
In 1904, he succeeded his father as chairman of the Burmah Oil Company and its associates, remaining in the post until 1943. Cargill (through his subsidiary Concessions Syndicate Ltd) provided from Glasgow the necessary finance, plant and equipment, and skilled manpower for the long drawn-out task of wresting oil from the inhospitable land of Persia. Not until 1908 were oil deposits found there, and a new subsidiary company, Anglo-Persian Oil Company was set up the following year.

He was also chairman of Scottish Oils, consolidating the main shale oil companies, from 1922 to 1943. He later served as figurehead of these companies, leaving the active running of them to their managing directors. He was also a director of the Anglo-Persian Oil Company and the Assam Oil Company.

He was a director of Glasgow Chamber of Commerce, a governor of the Royal Technical College, and a member of the Court of Glasgow University.

Escutcheon of the Cargill baronets of Lowther Terrace, Glasgow

Cargill was created a baronet, of Glasgow, in the 1920 New Year Honours. He was a Deputy Lieutenant of Glasgow and a member of the court of the University of Glasgow, which awarded him an honorary Doctorate of Laws (LLD) in 1929.

== Personal life ==
In 1895, Cargill married Mary Hope Walker Grierson, sister of Lieutenant-General Sir James Moncrieff Grierson. They had a daughter, Allison Hope Cargill (born 13 August 1896), but no sons, and the baronetcy became extinct upon Cargill's death. His wife died in 1929 and in 1943 he retired to a nursing home in Edinburgh, where he died. He was buried in Hillfoot Cemetery in Glasgow. He left large bequests to the University of Glasgow and the University of Rangoon.

== Footnotes ==
Business positions
Preceded by David Sime Cargill	Chairman of the Burmah Oil Company; 1904–1943	Succeeded by Robert Irving Watson
Preceded by Sir Charles Greenway	Chairman of Scottish Oils Ltd; 1922–1943	Succeeded by Sir William Fraser
Baronetage of the United Kingdom
New creation	Baronet (of Glasgow); 1920–1954	Extinct
