= Return to Cranford =

Season of television series

- DVD artwork
- Genre: Comedy drama
- Created by: Sue Birtwistle; Susie Conklin
- Written by: Heidi Thomas
- Directed by: Simon Curtis
- Starring: Judi Dench; Imelda Staunton; Julia McKenzie; Deborah Findlay; Barbara Flynn
- Composer: Carl Davis
- Country of origin: United Kingdom
- Original language: English
- No. of series: 1
- No. of episodes: 2

Production
- Executive producers: Kate Harwood; Rebecca Eaton
- Producer: Sue Birtwistle
- Cinematography: Ben Smithard
- Editor: Frances Parker
- Camera setup: Panavision Genesis HD Camera
- Running time: 90 minutes
- Production companies: BBC; WGBH Boston; Chestermead

Original release
- Network: BBC One
- Release: 20 December – 27 December 2009

Related
- Cranford (2007 TV series); Cranford (1972 TV series)

Return to Cranford is the two-part second series of Cranford, a British television series directed by Simon Curtis. The screenplay by Heidi Thomas is based on material by Elizabeth Gaskell published between 1849 and 1863: the novel Cranford, the novella The Moorland Cottage, and the short story The Cage at Cranford. Themes from My Lady Ludlow, Mr Harrison's Confessions and The Last Generation in England are included to provide continuity with the first series.

The two episodes were broadcast in the United Kingdom on BBC One in December 2009. In the United States, they were broadcast by PBS as part of its Masterpiece Theatre series in January 2010.

Most of the cast members from the first series, including Judi Dench, Imelda Staunton, Julia McKenzie, Deborah Findlay and Barbara Flynn reprised their roles, with Jonathan Pryce, Celia Imrie, Lesley Sharp, Nicholas Le Prevost, Jodie Whittaker, Tom Hiddleston, Michelle Dockery, Matthew McNulty, Rory Kinnear and Tim Curry joining the cast.

The new stories, which were written by Heidi Thomas and directed by Simon Curtis, took place in August 1844; a year after the wedding of Sophy Hutton and Dr Harrison.

== Cast ==
Listed in alphabetical order:

Actor	Role
Francesca Annis	Lady Ludlow, the Lady of Hanbury Court
Claudie Blakley	Martha, a maid to Matty Jenkyns
Andrew Buchan	Jem Hearne, a carpenter and father of Martha's daughter Tilly
Jim Carter	Captain Brown, retired officer who now works for the railway
Tim Curry	Signor Brunoni, an Italian magician
Judi Dench	Matilda 'Matty' Jenkyns
Lisa Dillon	Mary Smith, a guest of Matty Jenkyns
Michelle Dockery	Erminia, Brussels-educated ward of Mr Buxton
Alex Etel	Harry Gregson, a boy of poor parentage
Emma Fielding	Laurentia Galindo, a former milliner who now assists Lady Ludlow in her affairs
Deborah Findlay	Augusta Tomkinson, a spinster
Barbara Flynn	The Honourable Mrs Jamieson, a widow with aristocratic pretensions and the owner of her beloved dog, Giuseppe
Debra Gillett	Mrs Johnson, wife of Mr Johnson and fellow shopkeeper
Tom Hiddleston	William Buxton, Eton-educated son of Mr Buxton
Hannah Hobley	Bertha, the maid of Miss Pole
Celia Imrie	Lady Glenmire, the aristocratic sister-in-law of Mrs Jamieson
Alex Jennings	Reverend Hutton, former vicar to Cranford
Rory Kinnear	Septimus, ne’er-do-well son of Lady Ludlow, who has been living abroad in Italy
Nicholas Le Prevost	Peter Jenkyns, brother of Matty, returned from many years in India. Re-cast from Martin Shaw.
Julia McKenzie	Mrs Forrester, a widow, who owns a cow, Bessie, whom she loves as a daughter
Jonathan Pryce	Mr Buxton, a wealthy widower returning to live in Cranford after the death of his wife
Adrian Scarborough	Mr Johnson, town shopkeeper
Imelda Staunton	Octavia Pole, the town gossip
Jodie Whittaker	Peggy Bell, caretaker of her mother, Mrs. Bell, and brother Edward Bell.
Matthew McNulty	Edward Bell, a young man of specious motives.
Lesley Sharp	Mrs. Bell
Greg Wise	Sir Charles Maulver, a magistrate and owner of the local railway company

== Episode guide ==
Part One: August 1844

Matty Jenkyns has closed her tea shop and now looks after Tilly, the baby daughter of her maid Martha and carpenter Jem Hearne, while the pregnant Martha works in the kitchen. Captain Brown readies the opening of a train station at Hanbury Halt, five miles from Cranford. Lady Ludlow refuses to sell her land to enable a railway extension to the town. Mrs Bell, a widow with two grown children, continues deep mourning fourteen months after her husband's passing. Daughter Peggy dresses in hand-me-down clothes and has little opportunity to socialise with people her own age – including potential suitors. Wealthy Mr Buxton has returned to his lands following the death of his wife. He brings Eton-educated son William and also his ward Erminia, educated in Brussels. William and Peggy begin to enjoy each other's company.

At Hanbury Court, Lady Ludlow is dying. Miss Galindo attends to her needs and has tried unsuccessfully to contact Lady Ludlow's long-absent son Septimus – living in Naples ostensibly for his health – to inform him of his mother's illness. She eventually receives a letter indicating that he has arrived in London and is coming to Cheshire. After waiting several hours for her son's arrival, Lady Ludlow collapses and dies. Meanwhile, Martha has gone into labour as Jem is summoned to Hanbury Hall for his duties as undertaker. While he is gone, she begins to haemorrhage. No doctor is currently available with 10 miles of Cranford, so Martha and the baby die.

Septimus arrives at Hanbury Court with his foppish Italian companion Giacomo. Their lavish lifestyle drained Lady Ludlow's fortune, so she took out a mortgage on the estate. Her former estate agent, the late Mr Carter, made provision in his will that she be loaned money to pay off the mortgage from his bequest to Harry Gregson. Septimus begrudges the fact that he must pay back this loan with interest. Septimus arranges for a carriage to fetch Harry from his school and offers to give the boy £5,000 immediately if he will agree to relinquish his claim to the balance of the money owed to him. Harry would then be able to pay for establishment of a village school, while Septimus claims he will retain the estate. Although Harry is only fourteen, they seal the deal by shaking hands in a "gentlemen’s agreement." Mary Smith arrives to stay with Matty and says that she is engaged to Mr Turnbull, a wealthy man.

Captain Brown reveals to the town that the railway will now be able to reach Cranford, as Septimus has sold the entire Hanbury estate to the railway. Harry, dismayed, tells Miss Galindo of his agreement with Septimus, and she intervenes to put a stop to it. Many residents are still opposed to the railway – including Mr Buxton, who reveals that he owns a parcel of land previously thought part of Hanbury Park. He refuses to sell, blocking the railway's progress. Jem Hearne tells Matty that, if the railway does not reach the town, he and Tilly will have to leave Cranford due to lack of work.

Matty realises that she will have to change her opinion on the railway. She invites her friends and neighbours to accompany her on a train journey so they can see that it is not the evil force they think it is. Her four friends come, along with Mr Buxton, his son William, his ward Erminia and Peggy Bell. Although Matty herself feels a bit of motion sickness, others gradually relax and find themselves enjoying the trip. In a separate carriage, William and Peggy sit on opposite benches. As the train lurches, they are thrown together. He confesses his love for her and asks her to marry him.

The train returns to Hanbury Halt, and Mr Buxton tells Matty that it took great courage to try to persuade the others. He is sorry to have stood in the way of progress; thanks to Matty's excursion, he has decided to sell his land and allow the railway construction to proceed.

Part Two: October to December 1844

When Mr Buxton discovers that William and Peggy are engaged, he refuses to give his blessing, hoping instead to match William with Erminia. He takes out his frustrations on Matty, blaming her for presenting the opportunity for the two to be alone on the train. Determined to marry Peggy and hoping to become an engineer, William turns to Captain Brown for an apprenticeship on the railway.

Meanwhile, Peggy's brother Edward becomes an agent for Mr Buxton and takes charge of the sale of the parcel of land to the railway company. However, he embezzles some of the money. In addition, he evicts Mr Buxton's tenants, including Harry Gregson's family, falsely implying to Mr Buxton that arrangements have been made for the tenants' accommodation. Harry Gregson's family leaves Cranford after failing to get word to Harry.

Mary has written an article and sent it off for publication. When her stepmother arrives in Cranford, she reveals that Mary has gone back on her promise to marry Mr Turnbull. Mary wants to pursue her writing and leaves for London, leaving Matty alone in the house with her brother Peter.

Harry has been miserable at his school, where he was beaten by some of the other students. He runs away back to Cranford to discover that his family have moved on. When Miss Galindo and the Reverend Hutton are adamant that he return to the school, Harry runs away again, intending to stow away on the next train out of Hanbury Halt.

While working at the railway office, William stumbles across evidence of Edward's embezzlement. Edward arrives home and admits he stole the money to pay gambling debts. The Bells are told that, if convicted of the crime, Edward will be deported as an indentured labourer. Mr Buxton seizes upon the opportunity to offer Peggy a deal. He will arrange for Edward not to be charged if she calls off her engagement to William. Peggy decides to refuse Mr Buxton's offer. But when she learns the police have a warrant for Edward's arrest, her sense of duty compels her to accompany Edward on a flight to Canada. She sends a note via Miss Matty telling William what has happened, and he races to catch the departing train.

Not making it to the station on time, Harry jumps from a bridge onto one of the train cars. He had inadvertently released Mrs Forrester's cow Bessie her tether; and the animal wanders onto the tracks, is hit and killed, derailing the trai. William arrives at the site of the train crash and saves Peggy from the wreckage, only for Edward to steal her money and flee. The locomotive explodes as he runs past, and he is killed. William, who stayed at the train to assist other passengers, is injured in the explosion. Miss Galindo and the vicar realise that Harry was on the train when it crashed. He appears dead when the find him, but they prove he is still breathing, wrap him and rush him back to shelter.

Miss Matty decides she will use some of the money left from her shop to restore the assembly hall and hold a Christmas Eve party to bring everyone together. Invitations are sent and everyone accepts except Mrs Jamieson, who has not forgiven her sister-in-law, the widowed Lady Glenmire, for marrying Captain Brown. Matty is disappointed that she has not heard from Jem in a while. Meanwhile, Miss Galindo and the vicar put a new proposition to the recovered Harry: Miss Galindo will pool her money with Harry's and use it to buy a house near Harry's new school in Manchester, allowing him to return to the house and Miss Galindo each evening. They will fulfill Mr Carter's wish that Harry be educated and improve his position in life.

Mrs Forrester is still grieving the death of Bessie. Harry approaches her on the evening of the party and presents her with a new calf to replace Bessie. As people gather in the newly refurbished hall, Mrs Jamieson arrives on Peter's arm, having relented, and reconciles with the newlywed Captain Brown and the former Lady Glenmire. Magician Signor Brunoni then starts his show and asks Miss Pole to enter his "celestial box". After turning the box and showing it to be empty, he asks Miss Matty to come up and unlock the box. She finds Miss Pole inside the box holding Tilly, and Jem walks up the aisle and says that, with the train coming to Cranford, he is moving back.

== Production ==
Although Cranford is supposedly in Cheshire, none of the exterior scenes was filmed there. Locations used included Surrey, Hambleden, Windsor, Radnage, Leighton Buzzard, Berkhamsted, Wycombe, Syon House in Brentford, London and Isleworth in Greater London and Oxford. Interiors were filmed in Pinewood Studios. A large portion of filming was done at Lacock in Wiltshire (a location used for many films, including Pride and Prejudice and Emma for the BBC in 1995 and 1996, respectively and also for the Harry Potter films in 2000 and 2001). Filming of the railway sequences took place in Staffordshire at the Foxfield Railway.

== Awards and nominations ==
Year	Award	Category	Nominee(s)	Result	Ref.
2010	British Academy Television Awards	Best Supporting Actress	Imelda Staunton	Nominated	
2010	British Academy Television Craft Awards	Best Writer – Fiction	Heidi Thomas	Nominated	
2010	British Academy Television Craft Awards	Best Costume Design	Jenny Beavan	Nominated	
2010	British Academy Television Craft Awards	Best Sound – Fiction/Entertainment	Paul Hamblin, Peter Brill, Iain Eyre, and Lee Walpole	Nominated	
2010	Online Film & Television Association Awards	Best Motion Picture or Miniseries		Nominated	
2010	Online Film & Television Association Awards	Best Actress in a Motion Picture or Miniseries	Judi Dench	Nominated	
2010	Online Film & Television Association Awards	Best Supporting Actor in a Motion Picture or Miniseries	Jonathan Pryce	Nominated	
2010	Online Film & Television Association Awards	Best Supporting Actress in a Motion Picture or Miniseries	Imelda Staunton	Nominated	
2010	Online Film & Television Association Awards	Best Direction of a Motion Picture or Miniseries		Nominated	
2010	Online Film & Television Association Awards	Best Writing of a Motion Picture or Miniseries		Nominated	
2010	Online Film & Television Association Awards	Best Ensemble in a Motion Picture or Miniseries		Nominated	
2010	Online Film & Television Association Awards	Best Cinematography in a Non-Series		Nominated	
2010	Online Film & Television Association Awards	Best Costume Design in a Non-Series		Nominated	
2010	Online Film & Television Association Awards	Best Makeup/Hairstyling in a Non-Series		Nominated	
2010	Online Film & Television Association Awards	Best Music in a Non-Series		Nominated	
2010	Online Film & Television Association Awards	Best Production Design in a Non-Series		Nominated	
2010	Primetime Emmy Awards	Outstanding Miniseries	Kate Harwood and Sue Birtwistle	Nominated	
2010	Primetime Emmy Awards	Outstanding Lead Actress in a Miniseries or a Movie	Judi Dench	Nominated	
2010	Primetime Emmy Awards	Outstanding Supporting Actor in a Miniseries or a Movie	Jonathan Pryce	Nominated	
2010	Primetime Creative Arts Emmy Awards	Outstanding Art Direction for a Miniseries or Movie	Donal Woods, Mark Kebby, and Trisha Edwards	Nominated	
2010	Primetime Creative Arts Emmy Awards	Outstanding Cinematography for a Miniseries or Movie	Ben Smithard (for "Part 2")	Won	
2010	Primetime Creative Arts Emmy Awards	Outstanding Costumes for a Miniseries, Movie or a Special	Jenny Beavan and Alison Beard (for "Part 2")	Won	
2010	Primetime Creative Arts Emmy Awards	Outstanding Hairstyling for a Miniseries or a Movie	Karen Hartley	Nominated	
2010	Royal Television Society Craft & Design Awards	Best Sound – Drama	Paul Hamblin, Peter Brill, Iain Eyre, and Lee Walpole	Nominated	
2010	Satellite Awards	Best Actress in a Miniseries or a Motion Picture Made for Television	Judi Dench	Nominated	
2011	Golden Globe Awards	Best Actress in a Miniseries or a Motion Picture Made for Television	Judi Dench	Nominated	

== Home media ==
Return to Cranford was released on DVD on 28 December 2009. A DVD box set was also made available on 28 December 2009 comprising the first series, The Making of Cranford as well as Return to Cranford.

== Online texts ==
- Cranford at Project Gutenberg
- The Moorland Cottage at Project Gutenberg
- The Cage at Cranford
- My Lady Ludlow at Project Gutenberg
- Mr Harrison's Confessions
- The Last Generation in England
