= My Lady Ludlow =

1858–1859 novel by Elizabeth Gaskell

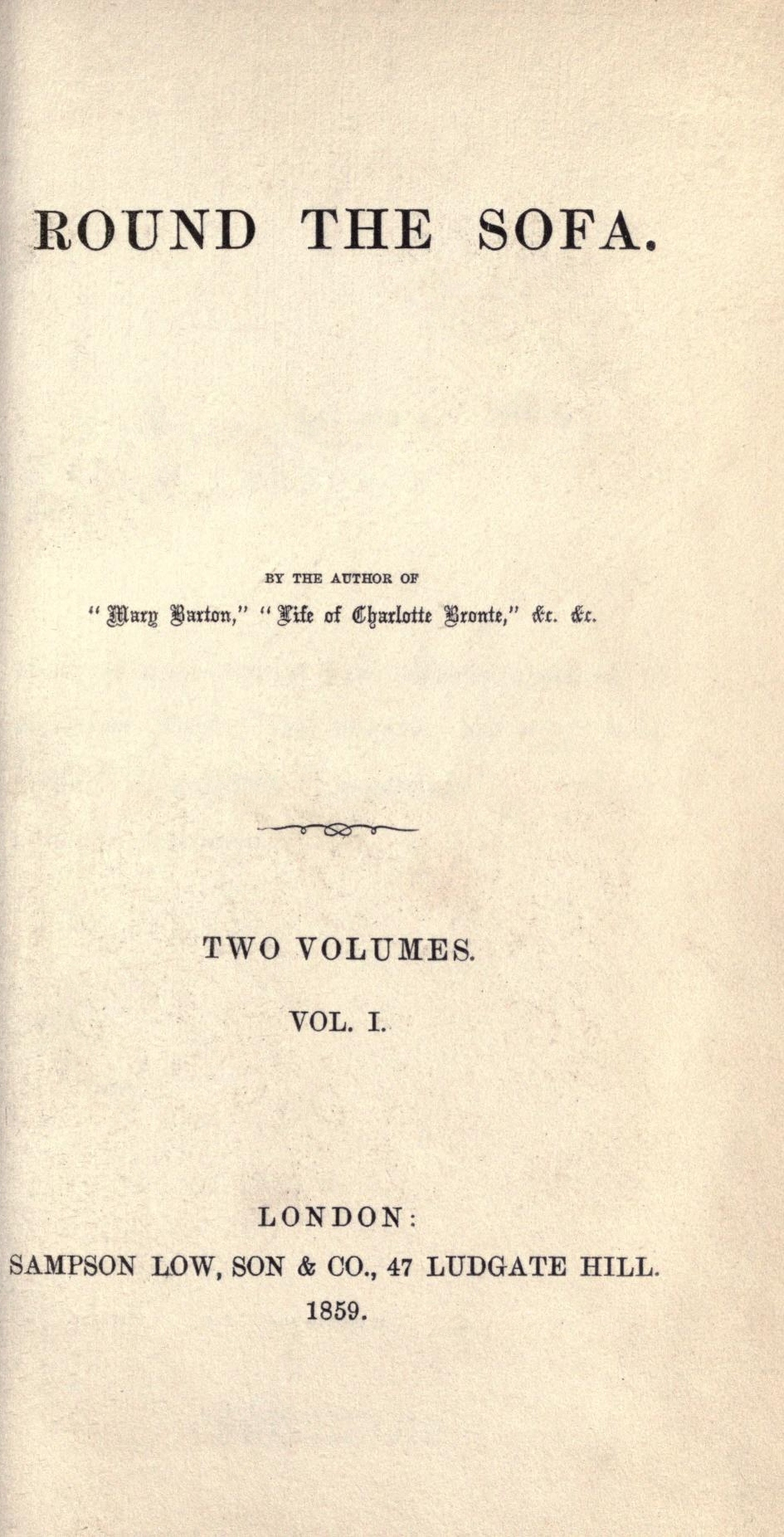
First edition title page from Round the Sofa; Vol 1 contains My Lady Ludlow in its entirety.

My Lady Ludlow is a novel (over 77,000 words in the Project Gutenberg text) by Elizabeth Gaskell. It originally appeared in the magazine Household Words in 1858, and was republished in Round the Sofa in 1859, with framing passages added at the start and end.

The novel follows the daily lives of the widowed Countess of Ludlow of Hanbury and the spinster Miss Galindo, whose father was a Baronet, and their caring for other single women and girls. It is also concerned with Lady Ludlow's man of business, Mr. Horner, and a poacher's son named Harry Gregson whose education he provides for.

The narrator of the story is Margaret Dawson, an elderly woman and distant relative of Lady Ludlow who was sent to live with the Countess as a teenager.

== TV Adaptation ==
With Cranford, The Last Generation in England and Mr. Harrison's Confessions, My Lady Ludlow was adapted for television in 2007 as Cranford, with Francesca Annis as the eponymous character, Alex Etel as Harry Gregson and Emma Fielding as Laurentia Galindo. Mr. Horner's name was changed to Mr. Carter, and was played by Philip Glenister. The character of Lord Septimus, the Countess' seventh child, is mentioned in the first series as he is in the novel. The book, however, was extended in the first episode of the second series Return to Cranford, featuring the death of Lady Ludlow from bone cancer, and Lord Septimus' return from Italy to claim his estate, where his ne'er-do-well personality is revealed. In the episode, Lord Septimus was portrayed by Rory Kinnear, with Annis, Etel and Fielding reprising their roles.
