= Cranford (TV series) =

British television series (2007, 2009)

- Title card
- Genre: Comedy drama
- Created by: Sue Birtwistle; Susie Conklin
- Written by: Heidi Thomas
- Directed by: Simon Curtis; Steve Hudson
- Starring: Judi Dench; Imelda Staunton; Julia McKenzie; Deborah Findlay; Barbara Flynn; Eileen Atkins
- Composer: Carl Davis
- Country of origin: United Kingdom
- Original language: English
- No. of series: 1
- No. of episodes: 5

Production
- Executive producers: Kate Harwood; Rebecca Eaton
- Producer: Sue Birtwistle
- Cinematography: Ben Smithard
- Editor: Frances Parker
- Camera setup: Panavision Genesis HD Camera
- Running time: 60 minutes
- Production companies: BBC; WGBH Boston; Chestermead

Original release
- Network: BBC One
- Release: 18 November – 16 December 2007

Related
- Return to Cranford; Cranford (1972 TV series)

Cranford is a British five-part television series directed by Simon Curtis and Steve Hudson. The teleplay by Heidi Thomas was adapted from three books by Elizabeth Gaskell: the novels Cranford, published 1851 to 1853, and My Lady Ludlow (1858), and the novella Mr Harrison's Confessions (1851). "The Last Generation in England" was also used as a source.

The series was transmitted in five parts in the UK by BBC One in November and December 2007. In the United States, it was broadcast in three episodes by PBS as part of its Masterpiece Theatre series in May 2008.

Cranford returned with a two-part Christmas special Return to Cranford in 2009.

== Plot ==
Set in the early 1840s in the fictional village of Cranford in the county of Cheshire in North West England, the story focuses primarily on the town's single and widowed middle class female inhabitants who are comfortable with their traditional way of life and place great store in propriety and maintaining an appearance of gentility. Among them are the spinster Jenkyns sisters, Matty and Deborah; their houseguest from Manchester, Mary Smith; Octavia Pole, the town's leading gossip; the Tomkinson sisters, Augusta and Caroline; Mrs Forrester, who treats her beloved cow Bessie as she would a daughter; Mrs Rose, the housekeeper for Dr Harrison; Jessie Brown, who rejects Major Gordon's marriage proposal twice despite her feelings for him; Laurentia Galindo, a milliner who strongly believes men and women are on equal footing; the Honourable Mrs Jamieson, a snob who dresses her dog in ensembles to match her own; Sophy Hutton, the vicar's eldest daughter and surrogate mother to her three younger siblings, who is courted by Dr Harrison; and the aristocratic Lady Ludlow, who lives in splendour at Hanbury Court and perceives change as a peril to the natural order of things.

The principal male characters are new arrival Dr Frank Harrison, who is smitten with Sophy but unwittingly becomes the romantic target of both Mrs Rose and Caroline Tomkinson, who frequently feigns illness to hold his attention; Dr Morgan, an old-fashioned practitioner who finds himself challenged by the modern ideas of his young partner; Captain Brown, a military man whose common sense earns him a place of authority among the women; Edmund Carter, Lady Ludlow's land agent, a reformer who strongly advocates free education for the working class; Harry Gregson, the ambitious ten-year-old son of an impoverished poacher, who as Mr Carter's protégé learns to read and write; farmer Thomas Holbrook, Matty Jenkyns' one-time suitor, who was considered unsuitable by her family but is anxious to renew his relationship with her; Reverend Hutton, a widower with four children whose religious conviction is sometimes at odds with his instincts as a father; and Sir Charles Maulver, the local magistrate and director of the railway company.

== Cast ==
Listed in alphabetical order:

Actor	Role
Francesca Annis	Lady Ludlow, the mistress of Hanbury Court
Eileen Atkins	Deborah Jenkyns, the moral guardian of the town
Claudie Blakley	Martha, a maid to the Jenkyns sisters
John Bowe	Dr Morgan, the appreciated surgeon of the town
Andrew Buchan	Jem Hearne, a carpenter and Martha's fiancé
Jim Carter	Captain Brown, retired officer on half-pay
Judi Dench	Matilda "Matty" Jenkyns, Deborah's sister
Lisa Dillon	Mary Smith, a guest of the Jenkyns sisters
Alex Etel	Harry Gregson, a boy of poor parentage
Emma Fielding	Laurentia Galindo, a milliner
Deborah Findlay	Augusta Tomkinson, a spinster
Barbara Flynn	The Honourable Mrs Jamieson, a widow with aristocratic pretensions
Michael Gambon	Thomas Holbrook, a farmer and Miss Matty's admirer
Philip Glenister	Edmund Carter, Lady Ludlow's land agent
Selina Griffiths	Caroline Tomkinson, Augusta's sister
Hannah Hobley	Bertha, the maid of Miss Pole
Celia Imrie	Lady Glenmire
Alex Jennings	Reverend Hutton, the vicar of the town
Dean Lennox Kelly	Job Gregson, Harry's father
Lesley Manville	Mrs Rose, Dr Harrison's housekeeper
Joe McFadden	Dr Jack Marshland, Dr Harrison's friend
Julia McKenzie	Mrs Forrester, a widow
Kimberley Nixon	Sophy Hutton, Rector Hutton's daughter
Alistair Petrie	Major Gordon, Captain Brown's friend
Julia Sawalha	Jessie Brown, Captain Brown's daughter
Martin Shaw	Peter Jenkyns, the Jenkyns sisters' long-lost brother
Imelda Staunton	Octavia Pole, a town gossip
Finty Williams	Clara Smith, Mary's stepmother
Greg Wise	Sir Charles Maulver, a magistrate
Simon Woods	Dr Frank Harrison, a new doctor

== Episode guide ==
Series One

Episode One: June 1842

New to Cranford are Captain Brown and his two daughters, who move in across from the Jenkyns sisters, Deborah and Matty. The sisters have recently welcomed Mary Smith, the daughter of a friend, to live with them. The elder Brown daughter is ill and dies shortly after their arrival. With her father away, the surviving sibling Jessie Brown, breaks with tradition and walks behind the coffin accompanied by her neighbour, Deborah Jenkyns.

The young doctor Frank Harrison arrives to assist Dr Morgan with his practice. His first patient is carpenter Jem Hearne, who has fallen from a tree and suffered a compound fracture. Instead of following the usual custom of amputating the injured limb, Dr Harrison delays immediate action in order to perform a relatively new and risky surgery to save the arm. His successful attempt makes him more known in the district.

Edmund Carter, estate manager for Lady Ludlow, takes an interest in young Harry Gregson, the bright son of a poor local family and offers him both work and an education.

When a valuable piece of historic lace belonging to Mrs Forrester is swallowed by a cat, she and Octavia Pole discover a novel use for a Wellington boot.

Episode Two: August 1842

Major Gordon proposes to Jessie Brown for the second time, before his regiment is to be sent to India, but she refuses him because she believes she cannot leave her father by himself. However, when it is revealed at Lady Ludlow's annual garden party that the railway will be passing close to Cranford and that Captain Brown will be away on railway business for long periods of time, Jessie regrets her decision.

Greatly dismayed at the news of the railway's arrival is Deborah Jenkyns, who accuses Captain Brown of deceiving them. Upon returning from Lady Ludlow's annual garden party, she complains of a terrible headache and, moments later, collapses in her bedroom and dies later that night.

Dr Harrison's romance with Sophy Hutton blossoms, only to be hindered when he cannot save her brother from the croup. The vicar's daughter suffers a crisis of faith.

Episode Three: November 1842

Dr Harrison's friend Dr Marshland comes to visit for Christmas and returns just prior to Valentine's Day, when he causes mischief by sending a card suggesting marriage to Caroline Tomkinson, who believes it came from Dr Harrison, whose romance with Sophy Hutton reignites. Dr Marshland also seems to take a liking to Mary Smith.

Guilty of poaching on Lady Ludlow's estate but mistakenly accused of assault and robbery instead, Harry Gregson's father Job finds himself in jail until Lady Ludlow, persuaded by both Mr Carter's pleas and seeing for herself the abject poverty in which the Gregson family lives, uses her influence to have the more serious charges dropped.

Thomas Holbrook reunites with Matty Jenkyns. In their younger years, their marriage plans were disrupted by her family's disapproval and a scandal involving her brother Peter. When Mr Holbrook contracts pneumonia on a journey back from Paris and dies, Miss Matty indicates she now considers herself a widow.

Episode Four: April 1843

Miss Matty learns the bank in which she has invested has failed, but she is determined to keep the news about her financial distress from her friends.

The railway construction approaches nearer to Lady Ludlow's estate, but instead of selling land to the railway, she mortgages her property to support her ne'er-do-well son Septimus, who is living in Italy.

Dr Harrison asks Reverend Hutton for permission to court Sophy. However, both Caroline Tomkinson and Mrs Rose mistakenly believe the doctor is interested in them. During the May Day celebration, Caroline's sister reveals to Reverend Hutton that Caroline is marrying the young man, an announcement that shocks Mrs Rose, who thought she was his intended bride. Confronting Dr Harrison – who is perplexed as to how he gave either woman such an impression – the vicar brings Dr Harrison's courtship of his daughter to an abrupt halt.

Episode Five: May 1843

The ladies of Cranford learn about Miss Matty's financial distress and secretly contribute to her welfare, with the sudden influx of cash explained as the result of an error in the bank's bookkeeping. Miss Matty opens a shop selling tea in her parlour. Her maid Martha marries Jem Hearne, and the newlyweds lodge with Miss Matty.

Mr Carter discovers that Lady Ludlow mortgaged the Hanbury estate to meet her son's financial demands, even though she may not have the resources to keep up the payments.

Despite Dr Harrison's protestations of innocence, Dr Morgan advises him to leave Cranford, since patients will no longer see him. Mary Smith helps by confronting Dr Marshland about his mischief with the Valentine cards, and they begin to sort out the misunderstandings that led to Dr Harrison's predicament. The doctor and Sophy are reconciled when he saves her from a potentially fatal attack of typhoid.

An accident at the site of the railway injures both Captain Brown and Mr Carter, the latter fatally. In his will he leaves his estate of £20,000 to Harry Gregson. £1,000 is to be used for his formal education at Shrewsbury School and the remainder to redeem the mortgage on Lady Ludlow's estate, but eventually to revert to Harry with interest. Major Gordon returns from India and brings with him Matty's long-missing brother Peter. Major Gordon proposes yet again to Jessie Brown, who accepts him at last. The series concludes with the wedding of Sophy and Dr Harrison.

== Production ==
The series, set to begin filming in 2005, originally was scheduled for six episodes, but budget cutbacks resulted in it being trimmed to five, with filming postponed until early 2007.

Although Cranford is supposedly in Cheshire, none of the exteriors was filmed there. Locations used included Surrey, Hambleden, Windsor, Radnage, Leighton Buzzard, Berkhamsted, Wycombe, Syon House in Brentford, London and Isleworth in Middlesex and Oxford. Interiors were filmed in Pinewood Studios. A large portion of filming was done at Lacock in Wiltshire (a location used for many films, including Pride and Prejudice and Emma for the BBC in 1995 and 1996, respectively, The Other Boleyn Girl, The Wolfman and also for the Harry Potter films in 2000, 2001 and 2008).

Steve Hudson, the original director, was replaced after six weeks because, according to Eileen Atkins, "He didn't really understand why it was funny."

== Broadcast and reception ==
Nancy Banks-Smith of The Guardian said the series "will see you through beautifully until Christmas. Elizabeth Gaskell's perfect little classic, beautifully and minutely observed, has been beefed up with two more stories . . . However, as the extra stories are also by Mrs Gaskell, they transplant pretty naturally ... It has a simply stunning performance from Eileen Atkins . . . The power of her performance is all the more remarkable considering the company she keeps."

Andrew Billen of The Times stated, "The cast was so strong it was almost distracting. But, as in any great ensemble, when the individuals came together nothing jarred ... This adaptation added up to even more than the sum of its considerable parts."

James Walton of The Daily Telegraph observed, "Heidi Thomas's script subtly brought out a more hidden element of Cranford life: that these people are simultaneously proud and ashamed of their provincial status. She also manages the Mrs Gaskell trick of making the town itself the main character ... [T]he result (and of course I mean this as a compliment) sharply recalls another TV portrait of life in a town near Manchester. Admittedly, Cranford features more Annie Walkers and fewer Elsie Tanners than early Coronation Street. Otherwise, the power of the matriarchs, the centrality of gossip and – when the chips are down – the touching sense of community, are all winningly similar. So too is the ability to subject the characters to clear-eyed scrutiny, while still retaining an obvious affection for them."

In the UK, the first episode was watched by 8.43 million viewers and ranked #6 for the week, outperforming ITV1's usually dominant I'm A Celebrity...Get Me Out of Here!. By the final episode viewership had dropped to 7.26 million, although the programme remained in the top ten.

== Accolades ==
Year	Award	Category	Nominee(s)	Result	Ref.
2008	Banff World Media Festival	Best Mini-Series	Sue Birtwistle, Simon Curtis, and Heidi Thomas	Won	
2008	British Academy Television Awards	Best Drama Serial	Sue Birtwistle, Simon Curtis, and Heidi Thomas	Nominated	
2008	British Academy Television Awards	Best Actress	Eileen Atkins	Won	
2008	British Academy Television Awards	Best Actress	Judi Dench	Nominated	
2008	British Academy Television Awards	Audience Award		Nominated	
2008	British Academy Television Craft Awards	Best Writer	Heidi Thomas	Nominated	
2008	British Academy Television Craft Awards	Best Costume Design	Jenny Beavan	Nominated	
2008	British Academy Television Craft Awards	Best Editing – Fiction/Entertainment	Frances Parker	Nominated	
2008	British Academy Television Craft Awards	Best Make-Up and Hair Design	Alison Elliott	Nominated	
2008	British Academy Television Craft Awards	Best Original Television Music	Carl Davis	Nominated	
2008	British Academy Television Craft Awards	Best Production Design	Donal Woods	Won	
2008	British Academy Television Craft Awards	Best Sound – Fiction/Entertainment	Paul Hamblin, Graham Headicar, Andre Schmidt, and Peter Brill	Won	
2008	Broadcasting Press Guild Awards	Best Drama Series		Won	
2008	Broadcasting Press Guild Awards	Best Actor	Michael Gambon	Nominated	
2008	Broadcasting Press Guild Awards	Best Actor	Philip Glenister	Won	
2008	Broadcasting Press Guild Awards	Best Actress	Eileen Atkins	Won	
2008	Broadcasting Press Guild Awards	Best Actress	Judi Dench	Nominated	
2008	Broadcasting Press Guild Awards	Writer's Award	Heidi Thomas	Won	
2008	Online Film & Television Association Awards	Best Supporting Actress in a Motion Picture or Miniseries	Eileen Atkins	Nominated	
2008	Online Film & Television Association Awards	Best Costume Design in a Motion Picture or Miniseries		Nominated	
2008	Online Film & Television Association Awards	Best Makeup/Hairstyling in a Motion Picture or Miniseries		Nominated	
2008	Online Film & Television Association Awards	Best Production Design in a Motion Picture or Miniseries		Nominated	
2008	Primetime Emmy Awards	Outstanding Miniseries	Kate Harwood, Rebecca Eaton, and Sue Birtwistle	Nominated	
2008	Primetime Emmy Awards	Outstanding Lead Actress in a Miniseries or a Movie	Judi Dench	Nominated	
2008	Primetime Emmy Awards	Outstanding Supporting Actress in a Miniseries or a Movie	Eileen Atkins	Won	
2008	Primetime Emmy Awards	Outstanding Writing for a Miniseries, Movie or Dramatic Special	Heidi Thomas	Nominated	
2008	Primetime Creative Arts Emmy Awards	Outstanding Art Direction for a Miniseries or Movie	Donal Woods and Trisha Edwards	Nominated	
2008	Primetime Creative Arts Emmy Awards	Outstanding Casting for a Miniseries, Movie or Special	Maggie Lunn	Nominated	
2008	Primetime Creative Arts Emmy Awards	Outstanding Costumes for a Miniseries, Movie or a Special	Jenny Beavan and Mark Ferguson (for "Part One")	Nominated	
2008	Primetime Creative Arts Emmy Awards	Outstanding Hairstyling for a Miniseries or a Movie	Alison Elliott	Won	
2008	Royal Television Society Awards	Writer – Drama	Heidi Thomas	Won	
2008	Royal Television Society Craft & Design Awards	Lighting, Photography & Camera – Photography – Drama	Ben Smithard	Nominated	
2008	Satellite Awards	Best Miniseries		Won	
2008	Satellite Awards	Best Actress in a Miniseries or Motion Picture Made for Television	Judi Dench	Won	
2008	Television and Radio Industries Club Awards	TV Drama Programme		Won	
2008	Television Critics Association Awards	Outstanding Achievement in Movies, Miniseries and Specials		Nominated	
2008	Writers' Guild of Great Britain Awards	Television Drama Series	Heidi Thomas	Won	
2009	Costume Designers Guild Awards	Outstanding Made for Television Movie or Miniseries	Jenny Beavan	Nominated	
2009	Golden Globe Awards	Best Miniseries or Television Film		Nominated	
2009	Golden Globe Awards	Best Actress in a Miniseries or a Motion Picture Made for Television	Judi Dench	Nominated	
2009	Golden Globe Awards	Best Supporting Actress in a Series, Miniseries or Motion Picture Made for Television	Eileen Atkins	Nominated	

== Sequel ==
A two-part sequel, Return to Cranford was broadcast by the BBC as a Christmas special in December 2009. Judi Dench, Imelda Staunton, Julia McKenzie, Deborah Findlay and Barbara Flynn reprised their roles, with Jonathan Pryce, Celia Imrie, Lesley Sharp, Nicholas Le Prevost, Jodie Whittaker, Tom Hiddleston, Michelle Dockery, Matthew McNulty, Rory Kinnear and Tim Curry joining the cast. The programme aired on 10 and 17 January 2010 on PBS in the United States.

The new stories, which were written by Heidi Thomas and directed by Simon Curtis, took place in August 1844, a year after the wedding of Sophy Hutton and Dr Harrison. Filming of the railway sequences took place at the Foxfield Railway in Staffordshire.

== Home media ==
The complete first series was released in a two-disc set by BBC Video on 11 February 2008. It includes a bonus feature, The Making of Cranford, with interviews with members of both the cast and production team. Return to Cranford was released on DVD on 28 December 2009. A DVD box set was also made available on 28 December 2009 comprising the first series, The Making of Cranford as well as Return to Cranford.

== Online texts ==
- Cranford at Project Gutenberg
- My Lady Ludlow at Project Gutenberg
- Mr Harrison's Confessions free eBook edition
- "The Last Generation in England"
