= Jane Stanley (died 1803) =

British aristocrat and philanthropist

Lady Jane Stanley
- Born: 1736
- Died: 1803 (aged 66–67); Knutsford, England
- Burial place: Great Budworth, Cheshire
- Parents: Edward Stanley, 11th Earl of Derby (father); Elizabeth Hesketh (mother)
- Family: James Smith-Stanley, Lord Strange (brother), Lady Elizabeth Stanley (sister)

Signature
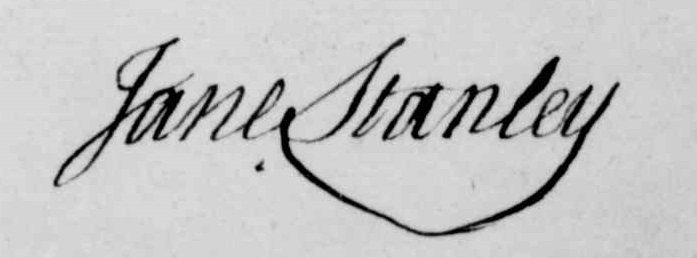

Lady Jane Stanley (1720 – 1803) was a member of the Earl of Derby branch of the Stanley family. The daughter of Edward Stanley, 11th Earl of Derby she never married but, in her old age, maintained a large household at Brook House, Knutsford. A notable philanthropist, she installed and maintained footpaths in the town though, in line with her belief that couples should not walk with arms linked, she made them intentionally narrow. Stanley left significant donations in her will to friends, family, servants and to numerous charitable causes connected with the poor and sick. One bequest helped to maintain the footways in the town for many years. Stanley was the inspiration for the Honourable Mrs Jamieson in Elizabeth Gaskell's 1849 novel Cranford and the title character in her 1858 My Lady Ludlow.

== Life ==
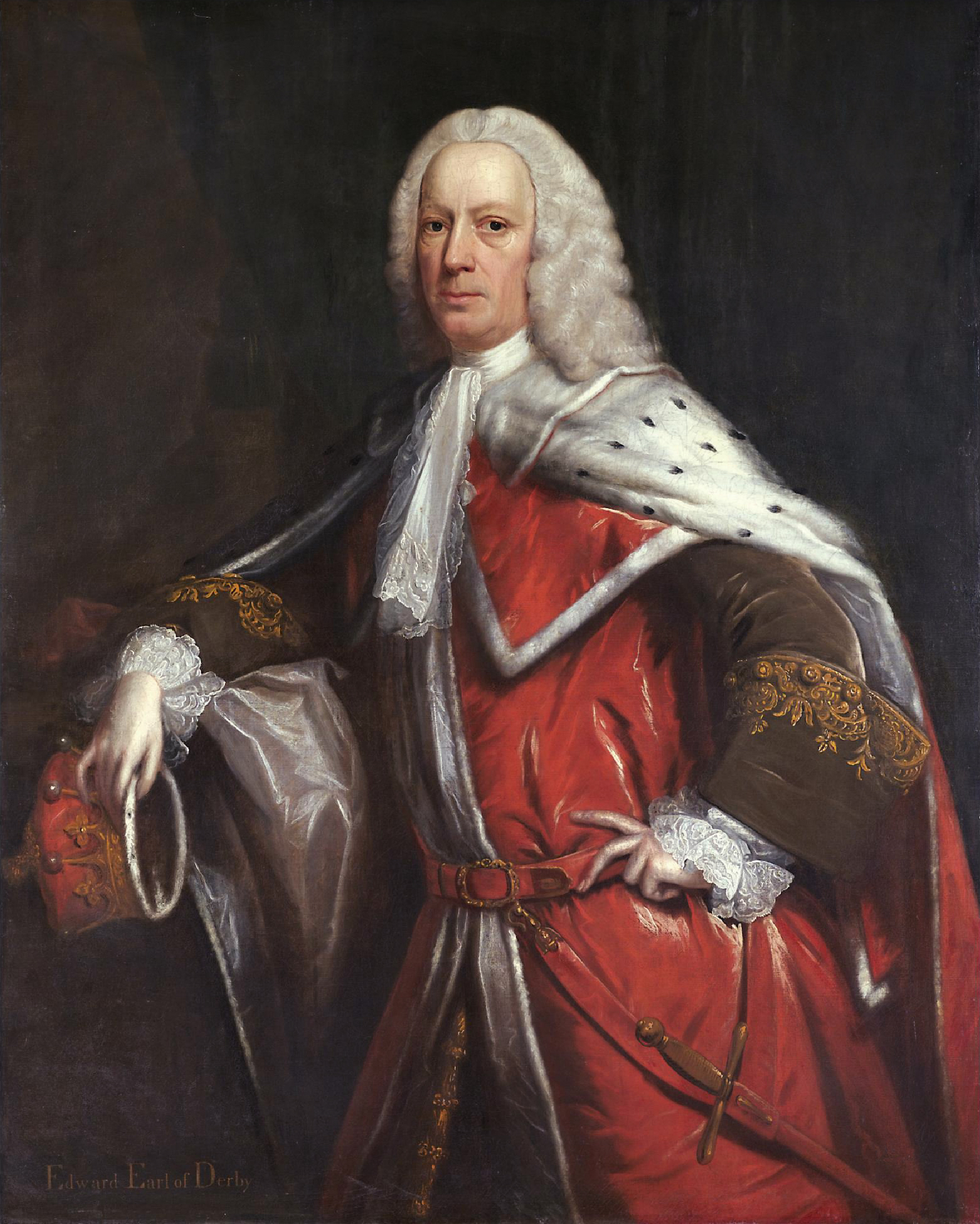
Stanley's father, the 11th Earl of Derby

Lady Jane Stanley was the daughter of Edward Stanley, 11th Earl of Derby and was born 1736. Stanley never married and from 1780 until her death lived at Brook House in Knutsford, Cheshire. She maintained a large household and one duty of her footmen was to bring her the latest news as soon as it arrived by mail coach. The mail coach used the road in front of Brook House and Stanley paid the guard five shillings a time to fire his pistol when passing to alert her servants of important news. A footman would then run to the inn in town to retrieve the news. She maintained a sedan chair, cheaper than a horse and carriage and better suited to Knutsford's narrow streets.

Considered an important and influential figure in Knutsford, Stanley was also well liked by her servants and neighbours. Ellis Chadwick, writing in 1910, noted "she had very strict notions of propriety and of the courtesies of life, and would not have them infringed". She firmly believed in her right, as a gentlewoman, to walk closest to the wall on the town's footpaths (ie the side away from the kerb). On one occasion when a man walking in the other direction chose to keep to the wall she rapped him on the shoulder with her gold-topped cane and told him "whenever you meet a lady - always give her the wall".

Henry Green, a local history writer, noted that she "disliked to see men and women linked together" (i.e., walking arm in arm). Stanley donated money throughout her life to construct and maintain footpaths in the town but specified that they be no more than a single flagstone in width to prevent couples from walking together. She also donated a woollen flag to the town that was flown from the church at times of military victories or other national rejoicings. Two portraits of her are known, one as a young child, and one of her in old age that she sent to Edward Smith-Stanley, 12th Earl of Derby, her nephew.

Stanley died in Knutsford, her will stipulated that she be buried in the vault belonging to her nephew Sir Peter Warburton in Great Budworth church. Shortly before she died Stanley composed her own epitaph: "A maid I lived and a maid I died; I never was asked and never denied".

== Legacy ==
Stanley's sedan chair in use for the Royal May Day festival circa 1900

Stanley left significant bequests as well as a £6,000 inheritance to her family. Two senior female servants each received £600 and all others with at least 3-years service received a full year's wages. A donation of £500 was made for the upkeep of the elderly and disabled in three local parishes and gifts of between £50 and £500 were made to 21 local women, which she specified was to be spent at their sole discretion "independent of, and free from the debts, power or control of her husband, or future husband". Stanley left sums of between £500 and £1,250 for infirmaries in Liverpool, Manchester, Chester and Bath, mental hospitals in Liverpool and Manchester, an asylum for the blind in Liverpool, a maternity hospital in Manchester and to the Philanthropic Society of St George for the promotion of industry and reform of criminals.

A sum of £400 was left to be used to repair and improve the footpaths she had laid out around Knutsford and to maintain the woollen church flag. This was invested in Consolidated Bank annuities, that generated a return of around 3% per year (£12) by the 1820s., These funds were used to fund the planting of trees around Knutsford Heath and c.1900 "Love Lane" was renamed "Stanley Road" in her memory.

Stanley's sedan chair has been used by the annual Knutsford Royal May Day procession since 1884. Stanley was the inspiration for the Honourable Mrs Jamieson in Elizabeth Gaskell's 1849 novel Cranford and the title character in her 1858 My Lady Ludlow, both based on her time in Knutsford.
