= British Academy Television Craft Award for Best Editing: Fiction =

Award for technical achievements in TV

British Academy Television Craft Award
- Country: United Kingdom
- Presented by: British Academy of Film and Television Arts
- First award: 1992
- Currently held by: Úna Ní Dhonghaíle for Prisoner 951 (2026)
- Website: http://www.bafta.org/

The British Academy Television Craft Award for Best Editing: Fiction is one of the categories presented by the British Academy of Film and Television Arts (BAFTA) within the British Academy Television Craft Awards, the craft awards were established in 2000 with their own, separate ceremony as a way to spotlight technical achievements, without being overshadowed by the main production categories.

Before splitting into two categories for editing in 1992, Best Editing: Fiction and Best Editing: Factual (presented from 1992 to 1994 as Best Film or Video Editor – Fiction and Best Film or Video Editor – Factual respectively), two categories were presented to recognize editing in television programming:

- From 1978 to 1991 Best VTR Editor was presented.
- From 1978 to 1991 Best Film Editor was presented.

== Winners and nominees ==
=== 1970s ===
Best VTR Editor

Year	Recipient(s)	Title
1978	Geoff Higgs	Macbeth
1978	John Hawkins, Tim Waddell	The Muppet Show
1978	Charles Huff	The Warrior's Return
1978	Steve Murray	The Ambassadors
1978	Neil Pittaway	Mike Yarwood in Persons
1978	Tim Whiffin	Love for Lydia/Hi Summer
1978	Yorkshire TV Team	Raffles
1979	John Hawkins	The Muppet Show
1979	Geoff Beames, Graham Roberts	Lillie
1979	Charles Huff	The Lost Boys
1979	STV VTR Section	The Prime of Miss Jean Brodie

Best Film Editor

Year	Recipient(s)	Title
1978	David Naden	The Christians
1978	Howard Billingham	The World About Us; Cuba Sports and Revolution
1978	Ron De Matteos	Open University: James Bond
1978	Tony Ham	Blind Love
1978	Stan Hawkes	Whicker's World: Palm Beach
1978	Dave King	Omnibus: Tilford
1978	Tudor Lloyd	Goodbye Longfellow Road
1978	Larry Loft	Wings
1978	Chris Lovett	A Hymn from Jim
1978	Reginald Mills	Jesus of Nazareth
1978	Des Murphy	Open University: Mass Communications and Society - ABC in Kansas City
1978	Jesse Palmer	In The Making
1978	Ken Pearce	The Three Hostages
1978	Tim Ritson	Chink In The Wall; Prime Minister On Prime Ministers
1978	Raoul Sobell	The Treasure of Porto Santo; Chronicle: The Acquisitors
1978	Tony Woollard	Eustace and Hilda
1978	Ralph Sheldon	Out
1978	John Costello	Me! I'm Afraid of Virginia Woolf
1978	David Martin	Pennies from Heaven; Brighter Than The Sun
1978	Jeremy McCracken	The One and Only Phyllis Dixey

=== 1980s ===
Best VTR Editor

Year	Recipient(s)	Title
1980	Sam Upton	Crime and Punishment; Suez 1956
1980	David Hillier	Churchill and the Generals
1980	Dave Lewington, Fred Turner	The Will Kenny Everett Make It To 1980? Show
1980	Stan Pow	Testament of Youth; The Brylcreem Boys
1980	Graham Roberts	Gloo Joo; Stanley Baxter on Television
1981	Jan Langford	The South Bank Show: The Passion; The Worst Of It'll Be Alright On The Night
1981	Matt Boney	Not the Nine O'Clock News
1981	John Hawkins	The Muppet Show
1981	Fred Turner, Dave Lewinton	The Kenny Everett Video Show
1982	Ian Williams	The Hitchhiker's Guide to the Galaxy
1982	Clayton Parker, Graham Roberts	The Stanley Baxter Series
1982	Stan Pow	The Journal of Bridget Hitler
1982	Graham Taylor	The Cherry Orchard
1983	Mike Bloore	Boys from the Blackstuff
1983	Terry Bennell	Nicholas Nickleby; Outside Edge
1983	Dennis Collett	Another Flip for Dominick; Nancy Astor
1983	Graham Roberts	The Stanley Baxter Hour; A Fine Romance
1984	Dennis Collett	Reith; The Last Day; The Hot Shoe Show
1984	Stan Pow	Mansfield Park; Macbeth
1984	Peter Reason	The Comedy of Errors; Two Gentleman of Verona; Video Stars
1984	Ed Wooden	Three of a Kind
1985	Stephen Newnham	The Box of Delights
1985	Ian Collins	Bird of Prey II
1985	Graham Sissons	The Trial of Richard III
1985	Kevin Waters	Shroud for a Nightingale
1986	Graham Taylor	Blott on the Landscape
1986	Malcolm Banthorpe	The Detective
1986	David Lewinton	L'Enfance Du Christ
1986	Michael Taylor	John Lennon: A Journey in the Life
1987	Malcolm J Banthorpe, Dave Jervis	The Life and Loves of a She-Devil
1987	John Baldwin	Spitting Image
1987	Clayton Parker	Fire and Ice
1987	Stan Pow	Bluebell
1987	John Sillitto	Stanley Baxter's Picture Annual
1987	Graham Sissons	The Trial of Lee Harvey Oswald
1988	Peter Hayes	Tutti Frutti (for "Episode 4")
1988	John Fortenberry, Ruth Foster	Graceland: The African Concert
1988	Gerry Law	Tutti Frutti (for "Episode 3")
1988	George Tidmarsh	LS Lowry: A Simple Man
1989	Editing Team	The Clothes Show
1989	John Baldwin	Spitting Image
1989	Roger Martin	Entertainment USA
1989	Mykola Pawluk	French and Saunders

Best Film Editor

Year	Recipient(s)	Title
1980	Ron Martin	Life on Earth
1980	Paul Carter	Public School
1980	Ann Chegwidden	The World About Us: Bloody Ivory (Special); Survival: River Of Sand (Special)
1980	Chris Wimble, Clare Douglas	Tinker Tailor Soldier Spy
1981	Tariq Anwar	Oppenheimer; Caught on a Train
1981	Jon Costelloe	Blade on the Feather
1981	Roger James	Death of a Princess; The Gamekeeper
1981	Trevor Waite and Editing Team	Hollywood
1982	Anthony Ham	Brideshead Revisited
1982	Tony Heaven, Dave Lee	Fighter Pilot
1982	Ralph Sheldon, Ann Chegwidden	The Flame Trees of Thika
1982	Leslie Walker	Winston Churchill: The Wilderness Years
1982	Alan Coddington	The South Bank Show: Music for a City – Venice
1983	Oscar Webb	A Voyage Round My Father
1983	Peter Heeley	The Flight of the Condor
1983	Greg Miller	Boys from the Blackstuff
1983	Chris Wimble, Clare Douglas	Smiley's People
1984	Ralph Sheldon, Edward Marnier	Reilly, Ace of Spies
1984	Derek Bain	Baryshnikov, The Dancer and the Dance; Cowboy Art; Agnes De Mille
1984	Ken Pearce	An Englishman Abroad
1984	Ralph Sheldon, Andrew Nelson	Kennedy
1985	Jim Latham	Threads
1985	Ann Chegwidden	The Heart of the Dragon
1985	Edward Mansell	The Jewel in the Crown
1985	Peter Rose	The River Journeys: Congo
1986	Ardan Fisher, Dan Rae	Edge of Darkness
1986	Howard Billingham	Omnibus: Leonard Bernstein's West Side Story
1986	Ian Callaway	Marilyn Monroe: Say Goodbye to the President
1986	Martin Elsbury	Kingdom of the Ice Bear
1987	Dick Allen	Hotel Du Lac
1987	Tariq Anwar, Julian Miller, John Stothart	The Monocled Mutineer
1987	Ken Pearce	The Insurance Man
1987	John Shirley, Barry Peters	Paradise Postponed
1987	Frank Webb, Jon Costelloe	London's Burning
1987	Bill Wright, Sue Wyatt	The Singing Detective
1988	Andrew Willsmore	The Duty Men
1988	Tariq Anwar	Fortunes of War
1988	John MacDonnell	Tutti Frutti
1988	Barry Peters	Porterhouse Blue
1989	Don Fairservice	A Very British Coup
1989	Jack Dardis	Game, Set and Match (for "Episodes 5,6,9,11 & 13")
1989	Chris Gill	Game, Set and Match (for "Episodes 1,2,3,4,7,8,10 & 12")
1989	Ken Pearce	Tumbledown

=== 1990s ===
Best VTR Editor

Year	Recipient(s)	Title	Broadcaster
1990	John Baldwin	Spitting Image	ITV
1990	Nigel Cattle	Casualty (for "Episode 2")	BBC One
1990	Editing Team	The Clothes Show	BBC One
1990	Stan Pow	The Ginger Tree	BBC One
1991	Malcolm Banthorpe	Casualty (for "Episodes 1 & 6")	BBC One
1991	John Beech, Ray Ball, Laurie Bunce	The Bill	ITV
1991	Mykola Pawluk	Drop the Dead Donkey	Channel 4
1991	David Yardley, Jonathan Hills	Una Stravaganza Dei Medici	Channel 4

Best Film Editor

Year	Recipient(s)	Title	Broadcaster
1990	Howard Billingham	Around the World in 80 Days (for "Part 5")	BBC One
1990	Tariq Anwar	Summer's Lease	BBC Two
1990	Jon Gregory, Neil Thompson, Andrew McClelland	Traffik	Channel 4
1990	Ray Wingrove	Mother Love	BBC One
1991	Dick Allen	Portrait of a Marriage	BBC Two
1991	Masahiro Hirakubo	The Green Man	BBC One
1991	Chris Wade	The Trials of Life (for "Episodes 2,3 & 11")	BBC One
1991	Chris Orrell	The Trials of Life (for "Episodes 5 & 10")	BBC One

Best Film or Video Editor, Fiction

Year	Recipient(s)	Title	Broadcaster
1992	Edward Mansell	Prime Suspect	ITV
1992	Alan Dixon	Casualty (for "Episodes 2,8 & 12")	BBC One
1992	Anthony Ham, Oral Norrie Ottey	G.B.H.	Channel 4
1992	Bill Wright	Clarissa	BBC
1993	Frances Parker	Unnatural Pursuits	BBC
1993	Mark Day	Memento Mori	BBC Two
1993	Edward Mansell	Prime Suspect 2	ITV
1993	Kevin Lester	Inspector Morse	ITV
1994	Mick Audsley	The Snapper	BBC
1994	Edward Mansell	Prime Suspect 3	ITV
1994	Oral Norrie Ottey, Trevor Waite, Chris Gill	Cracker	ITV
1994	Dave King	To Play the King	BBC

Best Editing, Fiction

Year	Title	Recipient(s)	Broadcaster
1995	Takin' Over the Asylum	Ian Farr	BBC Two
1995	Cardiac Arrest	Peter Hayes	BBC One
1995	Cracker	Edward Mansell	ITV
1995	Middlemarch	Paul Tothill, Jerry Leon	BBC Two
1996	Love Bites: Go Now	Trevor Waite	BBC
1996	The Politician's Wife	Alan Jones	Channel 4
1996	Cracker	Edward Mansell	ITV
1996	The Buccaneers	Greg Miller	ITV
1997	Hillsborough	Barry Vince	ITV
1997	Gulliver’s Travels	Peter Coulson	Channel 4
1997	The Fragile Heart	Neil Thomson	Channel 4
1997	The Crow Road	Angus Newton	BBC Scotland
1998	The Lakes	Roy Sharman	BBC One
1998	Holding On	John Stothart	BBC Two
1998	Tom Jones	Paul Tothill, Annie Kocur	BBC One
1998	Trial & Retribution	Terry Warwick	ITV
1999	A Rather English Marriage	Dave King	BBC Two
1999	Hornblower: The Even Chance	Keith Palmer	ITV
1999	Vanity Fair	Bill Diver	BBC One
1999	Our Mutual Friend	Frances Parker	BBC Two

=== 2000s ===
Year	Title	Recipient(s)	Broadcaster
2000	The Royle Family	Tony Cranstoun	BBC One
2000	Queer as Folk	Tony Cranstoun	Channel 4
2000	David Copperfield	Philip Kloss	BBC One
2000	Cold Feet	Tim Waddell	ITV
2001	North Square	Jon Costelloe	Channel 4
2001	Clocking Off	Nick Arthurs, Tony Cranstoun, Edward Mansell	BBC One
2001	Longitude	Peter Coulson	Channel 4
2001	Gormenghast	Paul Tothill	BBC Two
2002	Othello	Nick Arthurs	ITV
2002	Clocking Off	Mark Elliott, Edward Mansell, Tony Cranstoun	BBC One
2002	The Way We Live Now	Paul Tothill	BBC One
2002	Perfect Strangers	Mark Day	BBC Two
2003	Daniel Deronda	Philip Kloss	BBC One
2003	Bloody Sunday	Clare Douglas	ITV
2003	Shackleton	Peter Coulson	Channel 4
2003	Spooks	Colin Green	BBC One
2004	State of Play	Mark Day	BBC One
2004	Prime Suspect	St John O’Rorke	ITV
2004	The Lost Prince	Clare Douglas	BBC One
2004	Spooks	Paul Knight, Barney Pilling	BBC One
2005	Sex Traffic	Mark Day	Channel 4
2005	The Long Firm	Paul Tothill	BBC Two
2005	Shameless	Fiona Colbeck	Channel 4
2005	Dirty Filthy Love	Tania Reddin	ITV
2006	Bleak House	Paul Knight	BBC One
2006	To the Ends of the Earth	Philip Kloss	BBC Two
2006	Casanova	Nick Arthurs	BBC Three
2006	The Ghost Squad	Adam Recht	Channel 4
2007	Longford	Melanie Oliver	Channel 4
2007	Doctor Who	Crispin Green	BBC One
2007	Life on Mars	Barney Pilling	BBC One
2007	Prime Suspect: The Final Act	Trevor Waite	ITV
2008	Boy A	Lucia Zucchetti	Channel 4
2008	Five Days	Sarah Brewerton	BBC One
2008	Cranford	Frances Parker	BBC One
2008	The Mighty Boosh	Mark Everson	BBC Three
2009	Doctor Who	Philip Kloss	BBC One
2009	Margaret Thatcher: The Long Walk to Finchley	Anthony Combes	BBC Four
2009	Criminal Justice	Sarah Brewerton	BBC One
2009	White Girl	Una Ni Dhonghaile	BBC Two

=== 2010s ===
Year	Title	Episode	Recipient(s)	Broadcaster
2010	Mo		Kristina Hetherington	Channel 4
2010	Occupation		Victoria Boydell	BBC One
2010	A Short Stay in Switzerland		Adam Recht	BBC One
2010	Criminal Justice		Chris Wyatt	BBC One
2010	Red Riding 1974		Andrew Hulme	Channel 4
2011	Sherlock	A Study in Pink	Charlie Phillips	BBC One
2011	Eric and Ernie		Jamie Pearson	BBC Two
2011	Downton Abbey		John Wilson	ITV
2011	This is England '86		Chris Wyatt	Channel 4
2012	Sherlock	A Scandal in Belgravia	Charlie Phillips	BBC One
2012	The Crimson Petal and the White		Luke Dunkley	BBC Two
2012	Birdsong		Kristina Hetherington	BBC One
2012	Great Expectations		Victoria Boydell	BBC One
2013	The Fear	"Episode 1"	Trevor Waite	Channel 4
2013	Ripper Street		Úna Ní Dhonghaíle	BBC One
2013	The Thick of It		Anthony Boys, Gary Dollner	BBC Two
2013	The Hour	"Episode 1"	Gareth C. Scales	BBC Two
2014	The Fall		Steve Singleton	BBC Two
2014	An Adventure in Space and Time		Philip Kloss	BBC Two
2014	Top of the Lake	"Episode Six"	Alexandre de Franceschi	BBC Two
2014	Broadchurch	"Episode Eight"	Mike Jones	ITV
2015	Sherlock		Yan Miles	BBC One
2015	The Fall		Steve Singleton	BBC Two
2015	The Honourable Woman		Jason Krasucki	BBC Two
2015	The Missing		Úna Ní Dhonghaíle	BBC One
2016	Wolf Hall		David Blackmore	BBC Two
2016	An Inspector Calls		Alex Mackie	BBC One
2016	Humans		Daniel Greenway	Channel 4
2016	This Is England '90		Matthew Gray	Channel 4
2016	London Spy		Victoria Boydell	BBC Two
2017	The Night Manager		Ben Lester	BBC One
2017	National Treasure		Luke Dunkley	Channel 4
2017	Sherlock	The Abominable Bride	Andrew John McClelland	BBC One
2017	Fleabag		Gary Dollner	BBC Three
2018	Three Girls		Úna Ní Dhonghaíle	BBC One
2018	The Crown	"Paterfamilias"	Pia Di Ciaula	Netflix
2018	Line of Duty	"Moral Superiority"	Andrew John McClelland	BBC One
2018	Peaky Blinders	"The Duel"	Dan Roberts	BBC Two
2019	A Very English Scandal		Pia Di Ciaula	BBC One
2019	Killing Eve	"Nice Face"	Gary Dollner	BBC One
2019	Bodyguard	"Episode 1"	Steve Singleton	BBC One
2019	Black Mirror	"Bandersnatch"	Tony Kearns	Netflix

=== 2020s ===
Year	Title	Episode	Recipient(s)	Broadcaster
2020	Chernobyl		Simon Smith, Jinx Godfrey	Sky Atlantic
2020	Killing Eve	"Desperate Times"	Dan Crinnion	BBC One
2020	Giri/Haji		Elen Pierce Lewis	BBC Two
2020	Fleabag		Gary Dollner	BBC Three
2021	I May Destroy You		Editing Team	BBC One
2021	Normal People	"Episode 5"	Nathan Nugent	BBC Three
2021	Quiz		Pia Di Ciaula	ITV
2021	Small Axe		Chris Dickens and Steve McQueen	BBC One
2022	It's a Sin		Sarah Brewerton	Channel 4
2022	Line of Duty		Andrew John McLelland	BBC One
2022	A Very British Scandal		Dominic Strevens	BBC One
2022	Landscapers		Elen Pierce Lewis	Sky Atlantic
2023	This Is Going to Hurt		Selina MacArthur	BBC One
2023	The Crown		Celia Haining	Netflix
2023	Slow Horses	"Failure's Contagious"	Katie Weiland	Apple TV+
2023	Andor	"Announcement"	Frances Parker	Disney+
2024	Slow Horses	"Last Stop"	Sam Williams	Apple TV+
2024	Time		Alex Mackie	BBC One
2024	Happy Valley	"Episode 6"	Joe Carey	BBC One
2024	Slow Horses	"Old Scores"	Zsófia Tálas	Apple TV+
2025	Slow Horses	"Identity Theft"	Robert Frost	Apple TV+
2025	Mr Bates vs The Post Office		Mike Jones	ITV1
2025	Baby Reindeer		Peter Oliver, Benjamin Gerstein	Netflix
2025	The Day of the Jackal		Luke Dunkley	Sky Atlantic
2026	Prisoner 951		Úna Ní Dhonghaíle	BBC One
2026	Andor		Yan Miles	Disney+
2026	The Last of Us		Simon Smith	Sky Atlantic
2026	Slow Horses	"Scars"	Fiona Brands	Apple TV

== See also ==
- Primetime Emmy Award for Outstanding Single-Camera Picture Editing for a Comedy Series
- Primetime Emmy Award for Outstanding Single-Camera Picture Editing for a Drama Series
- Primetime Emmy Award for Outstanding Single-Camera Picture Editing for a Limited Series or Movie
