= William Duthie (author) =

19th century English goldsmith and poet

- Occupations: Goldsmith, writer
- Writing career
- Language: English
- Years active: 1852–1870
- Notable work: A Tramp's Wallet

William Duthie (fl. c. 1852–1870) was a mid-19th century English goldsmith and author of prose and poetry.

== Life ==
Born in London to working-class parents, William Duthie became a goldsmith. He left London to live in Hamburg for several years, and travelled in Germany and France.

After his return to London, he contributed to periodicals, such as Charles Dickens's magazine Household Words (1852–1855), Welcome Guest, The Cornhill Magazine, and Belgravia (1866–1870), recounting his adventures abroad. These articles led to the publication of A Tramp's Wallet (1858) and Proved in the Fire (1867).

Duthie also published novels and poetry.

During the mid-1850's Duthie was involved in the National Sunday League, an organisation which opposed Sabbatarianism.

== Works ==
- A Tramp's Wallet: stored by an English goldsmith during his Wanderings in Germany and France, London: Darton, 1858; London: Harwicke, 1865. (Dedicated to Dickens)
- The Pearl of the Rhone, and other Poems, London: Hardwicke, 1864.
- Proved in the Fire. A story of the burning of Hamburg (3 vols.), London: Wood, 1867. (Dedicated to Henry James Slack)
- Counting the Cost. A novel (3 vols.), London: Wood, 1867.

== Musical settings ==
Some of Duthie's poems were set to music:

- Jacques-Nicolas Lemmens, Six Four-part Songs, 1868. (All 6 texts by Duthie)
- Ciro Pinsuti, Choral Songs, [1869]. (4 of the 6 texts are by Duthie)
