= Mr. Harrison's Confessions =

Mr. Harrison’s Confessions is an 1851 extended story by Elizabeth Gaskell about a doctor in a small English country town, benefitting from familiarity with the work of a general practitioner in Gaskell's own family. Episodes from the story and other works were adapted into the 2007 television series based on her novel Cranford.

== Plot ==
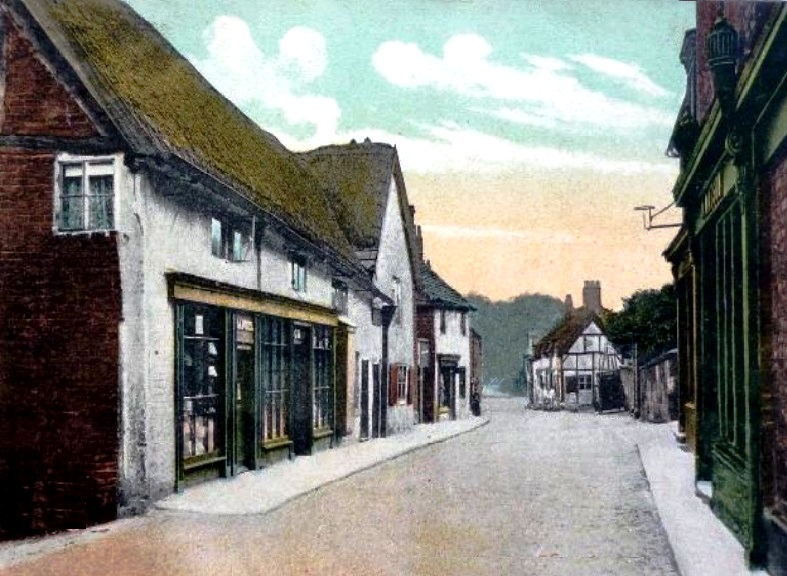
An old view of Knutsford, Mrs Gaskell's Duncombe

Upon completing his studies at Guy's Hospital, Frank Harrison is invited by Mr Morgan, an old friend of his father, to join Morgan's medical practice in the small country town of Duncombe. Impressed by being welcomed with enquiries about his welfare as soon as he arrives, Harrison soon learns that the main occupation of the town is gossip. Of this Mr Morgan had already availed himself in order to establish the status of his young partner, knowing that the smallest hints will be magnified with each telling.

Under Mr Morgan's instruction, Harrison is advised on professional behaviour and how to blend into the town’s conservative lifestyle. When he rents a house, Mr Morgan arranges for Mrs Rose, the widow of a neighbouring surgeon, to come and act as housekeeper. But there are ups and downs during the course of the joint practice. Neither doctor is able to save the life of the vicar's little boy from dying of croup; but when the gardener John Brouncker injures his wrist and is threatened with amputation, Harrison stands up to Mr Morgan and insists on a treatment that saves Brouncker's arm. Although Harrison's reputation increases among most villagers as a result, during the course of the dispute he had made an enemy of Miss Horsman, the town's most interfering and malicious gossip.

The turning point in Harrison's affairs begins when he is visited by his friend Jack Marshland, who lets out indiscreet details about his past and compounds the mischief by making it appear that Harrison is secretly in love with Caroline Tomkinson, a patient approaching middle age. At the same time Mrs Bullock, the attorney's wife, is trying to force her step-daughter Jemima on Harrison, while Mrs Rose misinterprets a conversation with him as a declaration of love. The growing rumours destroy Harrison's standing and he is denied entry to Mr Hutton the vicar's house, with whose daughter Sophy he is really in love.

All these complications are brought to a swift and melodramatic end after Sophy is sent away from home and returns dangerously ill. Only Harrison's intervention procures the medicine that cures her. Mrs Rose and Caroline Tomkinson find alternative husbands, while Jack Marshland confesses to his mischievousness and starts to court Jemima Bullock. Some time after Harrison and Sophy are married, another friend comes to stay with him and persuades Harrison to relate his story.

== Publication and reception ==
Mr Harrison's Confessions, a long story in 31 sections, was first given magazine publication in the Ladies' Companion in 1851 and the following year in Godey’s Lady’s Book in the U.S. Its first book publication was in the volume Lizzie Leigh: And Other Tales (1855) in the Collection of British Authors series and thereafter the story appeared in other such compilations and omnibus editions of Mrs Gaskell's works.

The story's small town setting has been identified with Knutsford, where Gaskell spent her early years. This was also the model for Cranford, the first episodes from which were appearing in Household Words at the end of the year in which Mr Harrison's Confessions was published. But the realistic medical details there had been learned from her uncle, Peter Holland, who had a London practice. Such a background adds to the story's comedy of manners an insight into the uncertain social status of the medical profession at the time. Mr Morgan emphasises a gentlemanly bedside manner as its defining sign while Harrison insists on the necessity of keeping pace with the latest scientific advances in treatment. The evident results are so much his vindication that Morgan ultimately confesses apologetically to having been "an old fool".

That Gaskell was delving into her youthful memories for her story, a process begun with her humorous magazine article "The Last Generation in England" (1849), is suggested by details within it. Harrison arrives in Dunscombe by coach and has to ride over to the neighbouring Chesterton for a rail connection to London. More indicative is Harrison's supposed association in London with the royal surgeon Sir Astley Cooper, who was appointed to that position in 1828 and had died in 1841, a decade before the story was published.

The link with Cranford was made explicit in the 20th century, usually while deprecating the story's quality by comparison. In a History of the English Novel it is judged a "coarser example of the Cranford manner" in which "the comedy degenerates into downright farce, the mere drollery of a magazine story." A later commentator finds in it "a precursor and preview to its famous cousin Cranford", but one that is "by no means a perfectly crafted story". It has also been located as occurring "at a pivotal moment of recollection" which led from "the semi-factual reporting of her earlier "The Last Generation in England"" via her story Mr Harrison's Confession to its final transmutation into the novel.

The culmination of such perceptions came when episodes drawn from these precursors, and from the later novella My Lady Ludlow, were combined in the five-part television series based on Cranford, first broadcast in 2007.
