= Frances Shayle George =

NZ teacher and writer (c.1828–1890)

- Born: Frances Southwell c. 1828; Clifton, England
- Died: September 8, 1890 (aged 62); Auckland, New Zealand
- Occupations: Teacher; writer; educationalist
- Spouse: Thomas Shayle George (m. 1848; died 1867)
- Children: 5

Frances Shayle George (née Southwell; c. 1828–1890) was a New Zealand teacher, writer and educationalist. Born in England, George emigrated to New Zealand in late 1850, where she established at least two private schools, including a school for young women. She advocated for the education of young women as a means of enabling them to support themselves and their families. She was also a published poet.

== Early life and marriage ==
George was born in Clifton, Gloucestershire, England between 1827 and 1829. Her father was a solicitor. She married Thomas Shayle George on 24 October 1848 in Boyton, Wiltshire. Together with their firstborn son, Frances and Thomas emigrated to New Zealand on the Sir Edward Paget in late 1850. They went on to have four more children together.

== Career ==
In 1852, soon after arriving in New Zealand, George established a private co-educational primary school based at her family's home in Mount Eden, and began publishing her writing, including contributing to Charles Dickens' magazine Household Words on the subject of early settler's life in New Zealand. She warned women migrating to New Zealand that they would need to work hard and do their own household chores due to the lack of domestic servants.

George's poems were published in New Zealand newspapers and more widely; "An Emigrant's Glance Homeward" (1852) was republished in Canada, Australia and South Africa. In 1855, she published a poetry collection titled A Shell from the South Pacific. The funds from its sale went to a charity supporting the families of British soldiers killed in the Crimean War. One poem, "The ordination of ROTA, the first Maori deacon, St Paul's Church, Auckland, Trinity Sunday, 1853", was published as an appendix to Our Maoris (1884) by Mary Ann Martin. The New Zealand Herald described her as "possessed of considerable literary and poetic ability".

In 1867 George established a private school for young women in Shortland Crescent, central Auckland, called Wye Cottage. In that same year, her husband left New Zealand after rumours of fraudulent conduct; he died the following year in Rock Island, Illinois. In the 1870s, George continued teaching in Auckland and her school expanded to additional locations, including Ponsonby. She was also a member of the Auckland Education Society and the Auckland Teachers' Association.

George advocated for educational opportunities for young women through letters and articles published in Auckland newspapers, and published a pamphlet on this topic titled Education of Girls in 1874. In the same year, George began advocating for the local council to establish a girls' high school; ultimately Auckland Girls' High School was established in 1878. She objected to the fact that female students could sit examinations with the Auckland Education Board but, unlike male students, were not granted scholarships if successful (they were instead offered "certificates of proficiency").

George did not however support equal rights for women or women's suffrage, believing that young women were not capable of long hours of study. She saw the purpose of women's education as enabling women to "live the truest and highest life of which [they are] capable within [their] own particular dominion", and to ensure women could support themselves and their families if needed. These views meant she clashed with advocates of equal rights such as Mary Colclough.

She died in Auckland, New Zealand on 8 September 1890, at the age of 62.
