= Maggie Lunn =

- Born: Margaret Hilary Lunn; 26 January 1961; Jesmond, Newcastle upon Tyne, UK
- Died: 19 February 2017 (aged 56)
- Education: Sacred Heart Grammar School; Newcastle University
- Occupation: Casting Director
- Spouse: Paul Jesson
- Children: 1

Maggie Lunn (born Margaret Hilary Lunn; 26 January 1961 – 19 February 2017) was an English casting director, for leading theatre companies and for notable productions on television and film.

== Life ==
Lunn was born in Jesmond, Newcastle upon Tyne, youngest of four children born to John Lunn, a school teacher, and Norah Lunn (née Lucey). She attended Sacred Heart Grammar School in Fenham, and read English at Newcastle University. Starting a career in journalism, she was a research assistant, at The Daily Telegraph and then at Private Eye.

Moving to casting in 1987, she was an assistant to the casting director Gill Titchmarsh, and later an agent at International Creative Management. In 1995 she was appointed head of casting at the Royal Shakespeare Company. In 2002, she joined Michael Attenborough at the Almeida Theatre as artistic associate. From 2001 to 2002 she was acting head of casting at the Royal National Theatre. With the Royal Shakespeare Company and later, she was interested in casting black and minority ethnic actors in roles usually regarded as white, notably David Oyelowo as the king in Shakespeare's Henry VI, at the RSC in 2001.

She then became a freelance casting director and worked on TV as well as theatrical productions. This included the production of The Rivals at Bristol Old Vic in 2016 where the cast she put together was part of the success of the production. She worked with other theatre companies including the Young Vic, the Old Vic and the Chichester Festival Theatre.

Her casting decisions were influential at the start of the careers of several including David Oyelowo, Benedict Cumberbatch, Ben Whishaw, Alex Jennings, Eddie Redmayne, Eve Best, Rory Kinnear and Lucian Msamati.

On television, she was casting director for productions including Pride and Prejudice (1995), Cranford (2007) and Great Expectations (2011). In film, productions included Carrington (1995), Notes on a Scandal (2007) and Broken (2012).

== Death ==
Maggie Lunn died of cancer in 2017, aged 56, survived by her husband, the actor Paul Jesson, and daughter Joanne from an earlier relationship. The director Rufus Norris, with whom she worked at the Almeida Theatre and later, said "To work with her was to enter a cauldron of robust and rigorous inquiry".

== Theatre ==
- Henry VI (2001), Royal Shakespeare Company, Stratford-upon-Avon
- Anything Goes (2001- 2003) National Theatre, London
- A Streetcar Named Desire (2001- 2003) National Theatre, London
- The Coast of Utopia trilogy (Voyage, Shipwreck, Salvage) (2001- 2003) National Theatre
- Festen (2004) Almeida, London
- Blood Wedding (2005) Almeida, London
- Hedda Gabler (2005) Almeida, London
- The Government Inspector (2005) Chichester Festival Theatre, Chichester
- A Moon for the Misbegotten (2006) Old Vic, London
- Birdsong (2010) Comedy Theatre, London
- Flare Path (2011) Haymarket, London
- Rosencrantz and Guildenstern are Dead (2011) Haymarket, London
- The Tempest (2011) Haymarket, London
- Bridge Project (2009 - 2012) Old Vic
- A Streetcar Named Desire (2014) Young Vic, London
- Speed-the-Plow (2014) Playhouse Theatre, London
- High Society (2015) Old Vic, London
- The Young Chekhov trilogy (Platonov, Ivanov and The Seagull adapted by David Hare) (2015), Chichester Festival theatre, Chichester then National Theatre, London
- The Rivals (2016) Bristol Old Vic, Bristol
- Long Day's Journey Into Night (2016) Bristol Old Vic, Bristol

== Films ==
- Carrington (1995)
- Funny Bones (1995)
- Archangel (2005)
- Notes on a Scandal (2006)
- Broken (2012)

== TV programmes ==
- Pride and Prejudice (1995)
- Cranford (2007) (BBC series) (Emmy nomination)
- Oliver Twist (2007)
- Robin Hood (2009) 13 episodes
- Hustle (2010 - 2011) 12 episodes
- Great Expectations (2011)
- The Hollow Crown (2012)
- Law and Order: UK (2013) Four episodes
- Silent Witness (2013) Four episodes

== Awards ==
She was nominated for one Primetime Emmy in 2007 for Cranford in the category of Outstanding Casting for a Miniseries, Movie or a Special.
