= Primetime Emmy Award for Outstanding Hairstyling for a Limited Series or Movie =

Award

Primetime Emmy Award for Hairstyling for a Limited Series or Movie
- Awarded for: Outstanding Hairstyling for a Limited Series or Movie
- Country: United States
- Presented by: Academy of Television Arts & Sciences
- Currently held by: Fosse/Verdon (2019)
- Website: emmys.com

This is a list of winners and nominees of the Primetime Emmy Award for Outstanding Hairstyling for a Limited Series or Movie.

In the following list, the first titles listed in gold are the winners; those not in gold are nominees, which are listed in alphabetical order. The years given are those in which the ceremonies took place:

== Winners and nominations ==
=== 1970s ===
Year	Program	Episode	Nominees	Network
1970	Outstanding Individual Achievement in Any Area of Creative Technical Crafts (Note: As a juried award, nominees had to garner 50% approval to win the award. The nominees did not meet the benchmark and no award was given.)			
1970	The Don Adams Special: Hooray for Hollywood		Edie Panda	CBS
1974	Outstanding Individual Achievement in Any Area of Creative Technical Crafts (Note: As a juried award, nominees had to garner 50% approval to win the award.)			
1974	Benjamin Franklin		Lynda Gurasich	CBS
1974	The Sonny & Cher Comedy Hour		Rena Leuschner	CBS
1975	Outstanding Individual Achievement in Any Area of Creative Technical Crafts (Note: As a juried award, nominees had to garner 50% approval to win the award.)			
1975	Benjamin Franklin	"The Ambassador"	Edie Panda	CBS
1975	Little House on the Prairie	"If I Should Wake Before I Die"	Larry Germain	NBC
1976	Outstanding Individual Achievement in Any Area of Creative Technical Crafts (Note: As a juried award, nominees had to garner 50% approval to win the award.)			
1976	Eleanor and Franklin		Billie Laughridge, Jean Burt Reilly	ABC
1977	Outstanding Individual Achievement in Any Area of Creative Technical Crafts (Note: As a juried award, nominees had to garner 50% approval to win the award.)			
1977	Eleanor and Franklin: The White House Years		Emma di Vittorio, Vivienne Walker	ABC
1977	The Great Houdini		Naomi Cavin	ABC
1977	Little House on the Prairie	"To Live with Fear"	Larry Germain	NBC
1978	Outstanding Individual Achievement in Any Area of Creative Technical Crafts (Note: As a juried award, nominees had to garner 50% approval to win the award. The nominees did not meet the benchmark and no award was given.)			
1978	The Awakening Land	"Part 3"	Sugar Blymyer	NBC
1978	Little House on the Prairie	"Here Comes the Brides"	Larry Germain, Gladys Witten	NBC

Outstanding Achievement in Hairstyling

Year	Program	Episode	Nominees	Network
1979
1979	The Triangle Factory Fire Scandal		Janice D. Brandow	NBC
1979	Backstairs at the White House	"Book Four"	Susan Germaine, Lola Kemp, Vivian McAteer	NBC
1979	Ike: The War Years	"Part 3"	Jean Burt Reilly	ABC

=== 1980s ===
Year	Program	Episode	Nominees	Network
1980
1980	The Miracle Worker		Larry Germain, Donna Barrett Gilbert	NBC
1980	Fantasy Island	"Dr. Jekyll and Ms. Hyde/Aphrodite"	Joan Phillips	ABC
1980	Haywire		Carolyn Elias, Bette Iverson	CBS
1980	Murder Can Hurt You		Naomi Cavin, Mary Hadley	ABC
1980	The Silent Lovers		Leonard Drake	NBC
1981
1981	Madame X		Shirley Padgett	NBC
1981	Father Damien: The Leper Priest		Janice D. Brandow	NBC
1981	The Jayne Mansfield Story		Silvia Abascal, Janis Clark	CBS
1981	Little House on the Prairie	"To See the Light"	Larry Germain	NBC
1981	Lou Grant	"Stroke"	Jean Austin	CBS
1982
1982	Eleanor, First Lady of the World		Hazel Catmull	CBS
1982	Cagney & Lacey	"Street Scene"	Stephen Robinette	CBS
1982	Fame	"The Strike"	Gloria Montemayor	NBC
1982	Jacqueline Bouvier Kennedy		Emma M. diVittorio, Dione Taylor	ABC
1982	Marco Polo	"Part 4"	Renata Magnanti, Elda Magnanti	NBC
1983
1983	Rosie: The Rosemary Clooney Story		Edie Panda	CBS
1983	The Life and Adventures of Nicholas Nickleby		Mark Nelson	Syndicated
1983	Missing Children: A Mother's Story		Janice D. Brandow	CBS
1983	Wizards and Warriors	"The Rescue"	Sharleen Rassi	CBS
1984	The Mystic Warrior		Dino Ganziano	ABC
1984	The Day After		Dorothea Long, Judy Crown	ABC
1984	Dempsey		Adele Taylor	CBS
1984	George Washington	"Part 1"	Janice D. Brandow, Shirley Crawford, Irene Aparicio, Cathy Engel, Emma M. diVittorio	CBS
1984	Samson and Delilah		Jan Van Uchelen	ABC
1985	The Jesse Owens Story		Robert L. Stevenson	OPT
1985	The Atlanta Child Murders		Janice D. Brandow, Robert L. Stevenson	CBS
1985	The Burning Bed		Stephen Robinette	NBC
1985	Love Lives On		Vivian McAteer	ABC
1985	My Wicked, Wicked Ways: The Legend of Errol Flynn		Adele Taylor	CBS
1985	Robert Kennedy and His Times	"Part 1"	Lynda Gurasich	CBS
1986	Second Serve		K.G. Ramsey	CBS
1986	Alice in Wonderland	"Part 1"	Josée Normand, Jo Thomas	CBS
1986	North and South	"Part 1"	Yolanda Toussieng, Shirley Crawford	ABC
1986	North and South, Book II	"Part 1"	Virginia Darcy	ABC
1987	The Two Mrs. Grenvilles	"Part 2"	Marsha Lewis, Mike Lockey, Sydney Guilaroff	NBC
1987	Amerika	"Part 3"	Virginia Kearns	ABC
1987	Fresno	"Part 4"	Carol A. O'Connell, Janice Alexander	CBS
1987	George Washington II: The Forging of a Nation	"Part 2"	Shirley Crawford, Irene Aparicio, Cathy Engel, Gus Le Pre	CBS
1987	A Year in the Life	"Springtime/Autumn"	Janice D. Brandow	NBC
1988	Poor Little Rich Girl: The Barbara Hutton Story		Claudia Thompson, Aaron F. Quarles, Jan Archibald, Stephen Rose	NBC
1988	Elvis and Me		Russell Smith	ABC
1988	Lincoln		Kelvin R. Trahan	NBC
1988	Right to Die		N. Kristine Chadwick, Kathy W. Estocin	NBC
1989	Jack the Ripper	"Part 1"	Betty Glasow, Stevie Hall, Elaine Bowerbank	CBS
1989	Around the World in 80 Days	"Part 1"	Dorothy D. Fox, Maria Rizzo, Wendy Rawson, Fung Wai Man	NBC
1989	Lonesome Dove	"On the Trail"	Philip Leto, Manlio Rocchetti	CBS
1989	War and Remembrance	"Part 3"	Janis Clark, Dino Ganziano, Chris Taylor, Jan Archibald	ABC

=== 1990s ===
Year	Program	Episode	Nominees	Network
1990	Fall from Grace		Janice Alexander, Dorothy Andre	NBC
1990	The Phantom of the Opera	"Part 1"	Cédric Chami	NBC
1990	Billy Crystal: Midnight Train to Moscow		Janice Alexander	HBO
1990	Blind Faith	"Part 1"	Carolyn Elias	NBC
1990	Great Expectations	"Part 2"	Eithne Fennel	Disney
1991	The Josephine Baker Story		Aldo Signoretti, Ferdinando Merolla, Jánosné Kajtár	HBO
1991	An Inconvenient Woman	"Part 2"	Anthony Esposito	ABC
1991	Lucy & Desi: Before the Laughter		Jeffrey Sacino	CBS
1991	Jackie Collins' Lucky/Chances	"Part 1"	Carolyn Elias, Barbara Lampson	NBC
1991	Son of the Morning Star	"Part 2"	Marsha Lewis, Jennifer Bell, Casey Camp-Horinek, Beth Miller	ABC
1992	Miss Rose White		Terry Baliel	NBC
1992	Homefront	"S.N.A.F.U."	Georgina Williams, Jerry Gugliemotto	ABC
1992	Marilyn and Me		Linle White	ABC
1992	O Pioneers!		Arturo Rojas	CBS
1992	Young Indiana Jones and the Curse of the Jackal		Meinir Jones-Lewis, Tricia Cameron	ABC
1993	Alex Haley's Queen		Linda De Andrea	CBS
1993	Citizen Cohn		Mona Orr	HBO
1993	The Jacksons: An American Dream		Robert L. Stevenson	ABC
1993	Love, Honor & Obey: The Last Mafia Marriage		Leslie Ann Anderson, Karl Wesson	CBS
1993	Sinatra	"Part 1"	Bette Iverson, Adele Taylor	CBS
1994	Oldest Living Confederate Widow Tells All		Linda De Andrea, Darlene Brumfield, K-Bobby	CBS
1994	Abraham		Elda Magnanti, Mauro Tamagnini, Gianna Viola	TNT
1994	The 66th Annual Academy Awards		Mary Guerrero, Gail Rowell-Ryan	ABC
1994	And the Band Played On		Arturo Rojas, Martin Christopher	HBO
1994	Frankenstein		Tricia Cameron	TNT
1994	Gypsy		Carol Meikle, Hazel Catmull, Gloria Montemayor	CBS
1995	Scarlett		Linda De Andrea, Tricia Cameron	CBS
1995	Big Dreams and Broken Hearts: The Dottie West Story		James Encao	CBS
1995	Buffalo Girls		Dorothy D. Fox, Lynda Gurasich, Michael Kriston	CBS
1995	In Search of Dr. Seuss		Danny Valencia, Erwin H. Kupitz	TNT
1995	Liz: The Elizabeth Taylor Story		Lynn Del Kail, Candida Conery	NBC
1995	Naomi & Wynonna: Love Can Build a Bridge		Linda De Andrea	NBC
1996	Gulliver's Travels		Aileen Seaton	NBC
1996	The Best of Tracey Takes On...		Audrey Futterman-Stern, Evelyn Rozenfeld	HBO
1996	Bye Bye Birdie		Roy Sidick, Judy Crown, Geordie Sheffer, Dean Scheck	ABC
1996	The Heidi Chronicles		Cynthia P. Romo	TNT
1996	Norma Jean & Marilyn		Andre Blaise	HBO
1997	Mrs. Santa Claus		Gloria Montemayor, Lola 'Skip' McNalley, Dorothy Andre	CBS
1997	Bette Midler in Concert: Diva Las Vegas		Robert Ramos	HBO
1997	Crazy Horse		Joani Yarbrough, JoJo Guthrie, Jeaneen Muckerman	TNT
1997	The Hunchback		Jánosné Kajtár, Monika Hufnagel, Libuse Barlova	TNT
1997	If These Walls Could Talk		Clare M. Corsick, Enzo Angileri, Sally J. Harper, Renate Leuschner, Voni Hinkle, Serena Radaelli, Cammy R. Langer	HBO
1997	The Odyssey		Suzanne Stokes-Munton, Petra Schaumann	NBC
1998	From the Earth to the Moon		Vicky Phillips, Lynda Gurasich	HBO
1998	The Day Lincoln Was Shot		Sally J. Harper, Bob Harper	TNT
1998	Don King: Only in America		Leonard Drake, Pauletta O. Lewis, Alan Scott	HBO
1998	Rodgers & Hammerstein's Cinderella		Jennifer Guerrero-Mazursky, Ellin La Var, Carla Farmer, Julia L. Walker, Kimberly Kimble, Lucia Mace	ABC
1998	The Warlord: Battle for the Galaxy		Josée Normand, Norma Lee	UPN
1999	Houdini		Judy Crown	TNT
1999	And the Beat Goes On: The Sonny and Cher Story		Tim Jones, Marlene D. Williams	ABC
1999	Cleopatra		Maria Teresa Corridoni, Desideria Corridoni, Barry Richardson	ABC
1999	Joan of Arc		Jan Archibald, Benjamin Robin	CBS
1999	The Rat Pack		Audrey Futterman-Stern, Gail Rowell-Ryan, Kelvin R. Trahan	HBO

=== 2000s ===
Year	Program	Episode	Nominees	Network
2000	Introducing Dorothy Dandridge		Hazel Catmull, Kathrine Gordon, Katherine Rees, Jennifer Bell, Virginia Kearns	HBO
2000	Annie		Matthew Kasten, Mishell Chandler, Natasha Ladek	ABC
2000	Arabian Nights	"Part 2"	Aldo Signoretti, Giorgio Gregorini, Massimiliano Duranti, Marina Marin, Ferdinando Merolla, Alessio Pompei, Nadia Rosati	ABC
2000	Gepetto		Judy Crown, Cheri Ruff, Shirley Dolle, Francine Shermaine, Warren Lewis, Gloria Pasqua Casny, Shannon Soucie	ABC
2000	RKO 281		Roseann Samuel, Elaine Browne, Karen Z.M. Turner, Aileen Seaton, Lesley Noble	HBO
2001	Life with Judy Garland: Me and My Shadows		Marie-Ange Ripka, Andrea Tranmueller	ABC
2001	Horatio Hornblower	"Mutiny"	Kevin Alexander	A&E
2001	Jackie Bouvier Kennedy Onassis		Bob Pritchett, Linda De Andrea	CBS
2001	The Last of the Blonde Bombshells		Lisa Westcott, Julie Dartnell, Beverley Binda, Jayne Buxton, Kate Benton	HBO
2001	The Lost Empire		Loulia Sheppard	NBC
2001	61*		William A. Farley, Hazel Catmull, Dino Ganziano	HBO
2002	Anne Rice's The Feast of All Saints	"Part 1"	Regan Noble	Showtime
2002	Band of Brothers	"Crossroads"	Helen Smith, Paula Price	HBO
2002	Dinotopia	"Part 1"	Suzanne Stokes-Munton	ABC
2002	James Dean		Carol A. O'Connell	TNT
2002	The Mists of Avalon	"Part 1"	Carol Hemming	TNT
2002	Path to War		Toni-Ann Walker, Joy Zapata, Stephen Robinette, Patricia Budz, Lumas Hamilton Jr., Ora Green	HBO
2003	Door to Door		Julie McHaffie	TNT
2003	Cher: The Farewell Tour		Serena Radaelli, Morgane Bernhard	NBC
2003	Frank Herbert's Children of Dune		Paul LeBlanc, Tamara Koubová	Sci Fi
2003	My House in Umbria		Maria Teresa Corridoni, Desideria Corridoni, Gianna Viola, Anna De Santis	HBO
2003	Napoléon		Agathe Dupuis	A&E
2004	The Reagans		Linda Bourgon, Marie-Ange Ripka	Showtime
2004	Angels in America		David Brian Brown, Jasen Joseph Sica, Angel De Angelis	HBO
2004	Dreamkeeper		Réjean Forget, Don Olson	ABC
2004	Ike: Countdown to D-Day		Paul Pattison, Kimberley Spiteri	A&E
2004	The Lion in Winter		Martial Corneville, Silke Lisku, Klári Szinek	Showtime
2004	Tracey Ullman in the Trailer Tales		Cydney Cornell, Charlotte Parker	HBO
2005	The Life and Death of Peter Sellers		Veronica McAleer, Enzo Angileri, Ashley Johnson	HBO
2005	Lackawanna Blues		Charles Gregory Ross, Fay Kelly	HBO
2005	Their Eyes Were Watching God		Alan D'Angerio, Barbara Lorenz	ABC
2005	Tracey Ullman: Live and Exposed		Audrey Futterman-Stern	HBO
2005	Warm Springs		Taylor Knight, Vanessa Davis	HBO
2006	Elizabeth I	"Part 2"	Fae Hammond, Sue Westwood	HBO
2006	Into the West	"Casualties of War"	Mary Hedges Lampert, Jennifer Santiago	TNT
2006	Into the West	"Manifest Destiny"	Iloe Flewelling	TNT
2006	Mrs. Harris		Bunny Parker, Susan Schuler-Page, Elle Elliott	HBO
2007	Jane Eyre		Anne Oldham, Faye De Bremaeker	PBS
2007	The 79th Annual Academy Awards		Maria Valdivia, Anthony Wilson, Cynthia P. Romo	ABC
2007	Broken Trail		Penny Thompson	AMC
2007	Bury My Heart at Wounded Knee		Iloe Flewelling, Chris Harrison-Glimsdale, Heather L. Ingram, Penny Thompson	HBO
2008	Cranford		Alison Elliott	PBS
2008	Bernard and Doris		Robin Day, Milton Buras	HBO
2008	John Adams		Jan Archibald, Loulia Sheppard	HBO
2008	Tin Man		Anji Bemben, Linda Jones	Sci Fi
2009	Grey Gardens		Jenny Arbour, Nancy E. Warren	HBO
2009	Gifted Hands: The Ben Carson Story		Julia L. Walker, Deena Adair, Clifton Chippewa	TNT
2009	House of Saddam		Marella Shearer, Juliette Tomes	HBO
2009	Into the Storm		Kerin Parfitt, Stefano Ceccarelli	HBO
2009	Little Dorrit		Karen Hartley	PBS

=== 2010s ===
Year	Program	Episode	Nominees	Network
2010	Emma		Anne Oldham	PBS
2010	Georgia O'Keeffe		Enid Arias, Geordie Sheffer	Lifetime
2010	Return to Cranford		Karen Hartley	PBS
2010	Temple Grandin		Geordie Sheffer, Charles Yusko	HBO
2010	You Don't Know Jack		Colleen Callaghan, Joseph Whitmeyer, Cydney Cornell	HBO
2011	The Kennedys		Jenny Arbour, Judi Cooper-Sealy	Reelz
2011	Cinema Verite		Terry Baliel, Carol Pershing, Beth Miller	HBO
2011	Mildred Pierce		Jerry DeCarlo, Jerry Popolis	HBO
2011	The Pillars of the Earth		Tricia Cameron, Loulia Sheppard	Starz
2012	American Horror Story		Monte Haught, Samantha Wade, Melanie Verkins, Natalie Driscoll, Michelle Ceglia	FX
2012	Hatfields & McCoys		Giorgio Gregorini, Peter Nicastro, Gabriele Gregorini	History
2012	Hemingway & Gellhorn		Yvette Rivas, Frances Mathias	HBO
2013	Behind the Candelabra		Marie Larkin, Yvette Stone, Kerrie Smith, Kay Georgiou	HBO
2013	American Horror Story: Asylum		Monte Haught, Natalie Driscoll, Janis Clark, Michelle Ceglia, Stacey K. Black	FX
2013	Liz & Dick		Beatrice De Alba, Lee Ann Brittenham, Richard De Alba	Lifetime
2013	Phil Spector		Stanley Hall, Cydney Cornell, Michael Kriston	HBO
2013	Political Animals		Mary Ann Valdes, Nancy Stimac, Qodi Armstrong	USA
2013	Ring of Fire		Susan Jennifer Lipson, Deena Adair, Darrell Redleaf-Fielder	Lifetime
2014	American Horror Story: Coven		Monte Haught, Michelle Ceglia, Yolanda Mercadel, Daina Daigle	FX
2014	Bonnie & Clyde		Audrey L. Anzures, Catherine Childers	Lifetime
2014	Mob City	"A Guy Walks Into a Bar"	Nina Paskowitz, Michael Moore, Elizabeth Cortez, Jennifer Singleton, Mary Howd	TNT
2014	The Normal Heart		David DeLeon, Todd McIntosh, Amber Crowe	HBO
2014	The White Queen	"Long Live the King"	Karen Dawson, Kate Starr, Julie Kendrick, Louise Coles	Starz
2015	American Horror Story: Freak Show		Monte Haught, Michelle Ceglia, Daina Daigle, Amy Wood, Sherri B. Hamilton	FX
2015	Bessie		Lawrence Davis, Monty Schuth, Iasia Merriweather, Victor Jones	HBO
2015	Grace of Monaco		Agathe Dupuis, Silvine Picard	Lifetime
2015	Olive Kitteridge		Cydney Cornell	HBO
2015	The Secret Life of Marilyn Monroe		Cliona Furey, Cathy Shibley, Jacqueline Robertson Cull, Vincent Sullivan	Lifetime
2016	The People v. O. J. Simpson: American Crime Story		Chris Clark, Natalie Driscoll, Shay Sanford-Fong, Katrina Chevalier	FX
2016	All the Way		Anne Morgan, Terrie Velazquez-Owen, Brian Andrew-Tunstall, Julia Holdren, Barry Rosenberg, Quan Pierce	HBO
2016	American Horror Story: Hotel		Monte C. Haught, Fredric Aspiras, Darlene Brumfield, Kelly Muldoon, Gina Bonacquisti	FX
2016	Fargo		Chris Glimsdale, Judy Durbacz, Penny Thompson, Cindy Ferguson, Tracy Murray	FX
2016	Roots	"Part One"	Tony Ward, Adam Gaeta, Talli Pachter, Sherri B. Hamilton	History
2017
2017	Feud: Bette and Joan		Chris Clark, Ralph Michael Abalos, Wendy Southard, Helena Cepeda	FX
2017	American Horror Story: Roanoke		Michelle Ceglia, Valerie Jackson, Jose Zamora	FX
2017	Big Little Lies		Michelle Ceglia, Nickole C. Jones, Lona Vigi, Frances Mathias, Jocelyn Mulhern	HBO
2017	Fargo		Chris Glimsdale, Penny Thompson, Judy Durbacz, Eva Blanchard	FX
2017	Genius	"Einstein: Chapter One"	Tash Lees, Fae Hammond, Adela Robova, Alex Rouse	Nat Geo
2018
2018	The Assassination of Gianni Versace: American Crime Story		Chris Clark, Natalie Driscoll, Shay Sanford-Fong, Helena Cepeda	FX
2018	American Horror Story: Cult		Michelle Ceglia, Samantha Wade, Brittany Madrigal, Julie Rael, Valerie Jackson, Joanne Onorio	FX
2018	Genius: Picasso		Kate Starr, Alex Rouse, Judit Halasz, Janosne Kajtar	Nat Geo
2018	Godless		Geordie Sheffer, Megan Daum, Carmen Jones	Netflix
2018	The Last Tycoon	"Oscar, Oscar, Oscar"	Theraesa Rivers, Valerie Jackson, Mishell Chandler, Amanda Mofield, Deborah Pierce, Loretta Nero	Amazon
2018	Twin Peaks		Clare M. Corsick, Bryn Leetch	Showtime
2019
2019	Fosse/Verdon		Christopher Fulton, Christen Edwards, Nicole Bridgeford, Christine Cantrell, Charlene Belmond	FX
2019	Chernobyl		Julio Parodi, Jovana Jovanavic	HBO
2019	Deadwood: The Movie		Melissa Yonkey, Laine Trzinski, Jose Zamora	HBO
2019	Sharp Objects	"Closer"	Jose Zamora, Michelle Ceglia, Jocelyn Mulhern, Patti Dehaney, Melissa Yonkey, Stacey K. Black	HBO
2019	True Detective		Brian B. Badie, Andrea Mona Bowman, Lawrence Cornell Davis	HBO

== Programs with multiple wins ==
3 wins

- American Horror Story

2 wins

- American Crime Story

== Programs with multiple nominations ==
7 nominations

- American Horror Story

2 nominations

- American Crime Story
- Fargo
- Genius
- Into the West
