= Sue Birtwistle =

British television producer (born 1945)

Susan Elizabeth Birtwistle, Lady Eyre, (born 9 December 1945) is a producer and writer of television drama. Birtwistle has won awards for several of her productions, including Hotel du Lac, Pride and Prejudice and Emma, and was one of the nominees for the 2008 BAFTA Awards for her production of Cranford.

== Early life ==
Birtwistle was born in Northwich, Cheshire, England, and attended Northwich County Grammar School for Girls (now The County High School, Leftwich). She studied drama and English at Coventry College of Education (became part of the University of Warwick).

Her father worked for British Rail, lastly as an instructor in Crewe. Her mother died in March 1998.

== Career ==
=== Partial filmography as producer ===
- Oi For England
- Educating Marmalade, 1982–83
- Dutch Girls, 1985
- Hotel du Lac, 1986
- Scoop, 1987
- Ball Trap on the Cote Sauvage, 1989
- Or Shall We Die?
- v.
- Pride and Prejudice, 1995
- Emma, 1996
- Armadillo
- King Lear
- Wives and Daughters, 1999
- Cranford, 2007
- Return to Cranford, 2009

== Personal life ==
Birtwistle married the English film, theatre, television and opera director Richard Eyre in July 1973 at Chelsea Register Office in London; they have one daughter.

In 2008, she was awarded an honorary doctorate at the University of Chester.

Birtwistle was diagnosed with Alzheimer's disease in May 2020; her husband, who's mother had also had the condition, had response something was wrong. The disease was manageable into early 2026.
