= Hotel du Lac (film) =

1986 television film directed by Giles Foster

- DVD cover
- Based on: Hotel du Lac by Anita Brookner
- Written by: Christopher Hampton
- Directed by: Giles Foster
- Starring: Anna Massey; Denholm Elliott
- Music by: Carl Davis
- Country of origin: United Kingdom
- Original language: English

Production
- Producer: Sue Birtwistle
- Cinematography: Kenneth MacMillan
- Editor: Dick Allen
- Running time: 75

Original release
- Network: BBC
- Release: 2 March 1986

Hotel du Lac is a television adaptation of the 1984 Booker Prize–winning novel of the same title by Anita Brookner. It stars Anna Massey and Denholm Elliott, and was released in 1986 as an episode of the BBC's Screen Two series. It was directed by Giles Foster and produced by Sue Birtwistle, with music by Carl Davis and cinematography by Kenneth MacMillan.

It aired in the UK on 2 March 1986.

== Plot synopsis ==
A romance novelist, Edith Hope (who writes under the name Vanessa Wilde), goes to stay at a Swiss hotel on a lakeside in order to get away from an ill-fated romance with David, a married auctioneer – after having jilted another man on the steps of the wedding venue, to the disgust of her friends.

At the hotel she writes letters to her ex-lover, David, which tell the story of their relationship – but they are never sent.

Also staying at the hotel are the gauche, flamboyantly wealthy, but vulgar Iris Pusey and her middle-aged daughter, Jennifer, who seduces the hotel staff and fellow guest Mr. Neville.

Edith is befriended by Monica, the wife of a British diplomat serving at the EC, who is there for health reasons.

Spurning Jennifer's attentions, Mr. Neville woos Edith and proposes marriage. Edith turns him down when she realises he is still sleeping with Jennifer. She writes again to David to tell him that she is returning to London – and unlike the other letters, she posts this one.

== Cast ==
- Anna Massey as Edith Hope
- Denholm Elliott as Philip Neville
- Googie Withers as Mrs Pusey
- Julia McKenzie as Jennifer Pusey
- Patricia Hodge as Monica
- Irene Handl as Madame de Bonneuil
- Barry Foster as David Simmonds
- Ann Firbank as Penelope Milne
- Geoffrey Chater as George Webb
- Jeffry Wickham as Geoffrey Long

== Production ==
It was filmed at the Park Hotel, Vitznau, on Lake Lucerne.

== Reception ==
The TV play was nominated for nine BAFTA Awards and won three: Best Actress (Anna Massey), Best Film Editor (Dick Allen) and Best Single Drama (Sue Birtwistle and Giles Foster).

One review stated that while there are some significant differences from the original book, the adaptation "does, finally, capture the spirit of the novel".

== Home media ==
The film was released on VHS in 1988 and on DVD in 2003.
