= Dick Allen (film editor) =

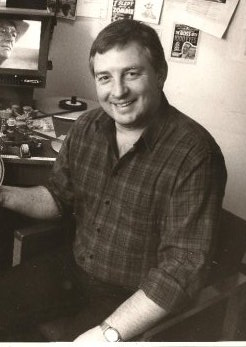
Dick Allen in the 1980s

Dick Allen (21 March 1944 – 6 February 2007) was a film editor who worked both as a freelancer and for the BBC. During his career he received two British Academy awards (BAFTA) for best film editor; one for his work on the TV film adaptation Hotel du Lac, and the other on the TV mini series Portrait of a Marriage.

== Biography ==
Dick Allen (christened Richard Allen), was born in London, England, and grew up in nearby Surrey. He attended Ardingly College in West Sussex, before taking an apprenticeship at aeronautical manufacturer Vickers at their base in Brooklands near Weybridge. He joined the BBC in 1964 after he was recommended by a friend, and stayed in their employment for 28 years, first in the film library and eventually as a film editor. By 1973, he was a film editor in his own right, in demand for his services. He worked on some of the corporations major documentary series, such as David Attenborough's The Tribal Eye, as well as dramas and comedies of the 1970s and 1980s.

He received two BAFTA awards, the first in 1986 for his work on Hotel du Lac, and then again in 1991 for Portrait of a Marriage. He left the BBC in the same year but continued to work until the birth of his son in 1994 when he gave up editing to be a stay at home father. He also had two children from his first marriage; a daughter in 1969 and a son in 1971. He died in 2007 at the age of 62.
