= Rebecca Eaton =

American television producer

Rebecca Eaton OBE
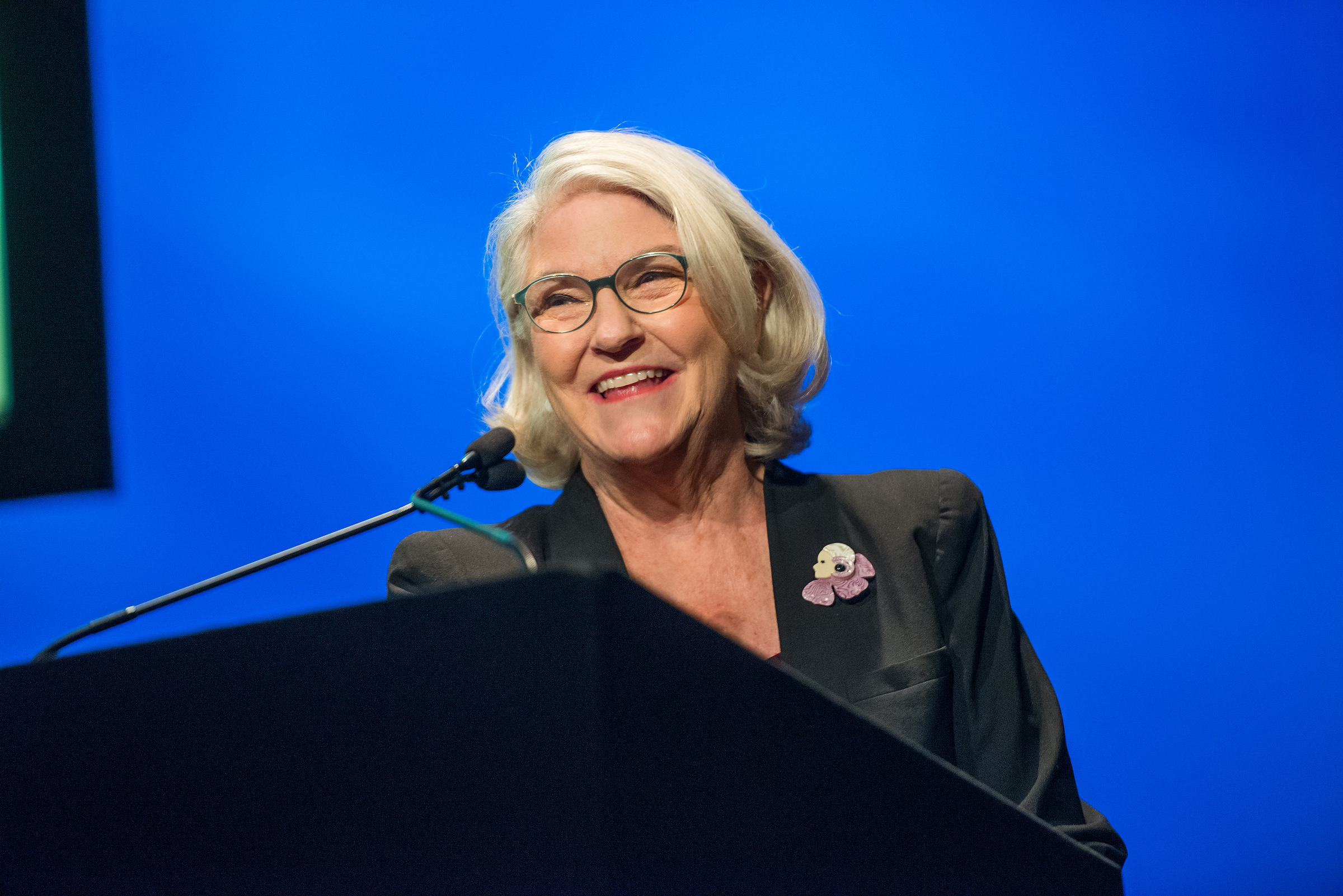
- Eaton in 2015
- Born: November 7, 1947 (age 78); Boston, Massachusetts, U.S.
- Occupations: Television producer, film producer
- Spouse: Paul Robert Cooper (1984–present)

Rebecca Eaton OBE (born November 7, 1947) is an American television producer and film producer best known for introducing American audiences to British costume and countryside dramas as executive producer of the PBS Masterpiece series.

In 2011, she was named one of Time magazine's "100 Most Influential People in the World".

== Early life ==
Eaton was born in Boston and raised in Pasadena, California, her father a Caltech English literature professor and her mother, Katherine Emery, an actress both on Broadway (in Lillian Hellman's The Children's Hour) and in film. Eaton recalls visiting New York every summer to see Broadway shows as well as spending her junior high school days lost in Jane Eyre.

== Education ==
Eaton attended Polytechnic School, graduating in 1965, and then Vassar, graduating in 1969 with an A.B. in English literature. Her senior thesis was on James Joyce's Dubliners. In 1969–70 she was a production assistant for the BBC World Service in London. Returning to the U.S., she was in 1972 hired by WGBH in Boston, there producing Pantechnicon (a radio arts magazine) and the television programs Zoom and Enterprise.

== Career ==
Eaton became the third executive producer of Masterpiece Theatre. Christopher Sarson was at the helm from its inception in 1971. Sarson had bought Upstairs, Downstairs from ITV. Eaton succeeded the series' second executive producer, Joan Wilson, in 1985.

Under Eaton, Masterpiece extended its reach into feature film co-production for such films as Jane Austen's Persuasion and Mrs. Brown starring Dame Judi Dench.

By 2011, she had been executive producer of the show for more than 25 of its 40 years on the air.

On November 21, 2019 WBGH Boston announced that Eaton would retire and take the position of Executive-Producer-at-Large. Susanne Simpson succeed Eaton as Executive Produce of Masterpiece. As Executive-Producer-at-Large she developed new drama projects and fundraised for the Masterpiece Trust. In November 2024 she retired from the position of Executive-Producer-at-Large of Masterpiece.

== Personal life ==
In 1984, Eaton married sculptor Paul Robert Cooper. Their daughter was born shortly before Eaton was named executive producer of Masterpiece. She credits her husband's willingness to stay at home with having advanced her career.

== Honours ==
Eaton's honours include 62 Primetime Emmy Awards, 16 Peabody Awards, six Golden Globes, and two Academy Award nominations (for the Masterpiece co-production Mrs. Brown). Queen Elizabeth II has honored her with an honorary OBE (Officer of the Order of the British Empire). In 2011 she was one of Time magazine's "100 Most Influential People in the World".

== Television series ==
Since becoming executive producer of Masterpiece in 1985, Eaton is credited with producing for American audiences series that include:

- Prime Suspect
- Bleak House
- The Lost Prince (WGBH)
- Inspector Morse
- Agatha Christie's Marple
- House of Cards
- Tony Hillerman's Skinwalkers, Coyote Waits, and A Thief of Time
- The Complete Jane Austen
- Cranford (WGBH)
- Wallander
- Little Dorrit
- Sherlock
- Downton Abbey (WGBH)
- Upstairs, Downstairs (remake)
- Endeavour
