= Household Words =

1850s magazine edited by Charles Dickens

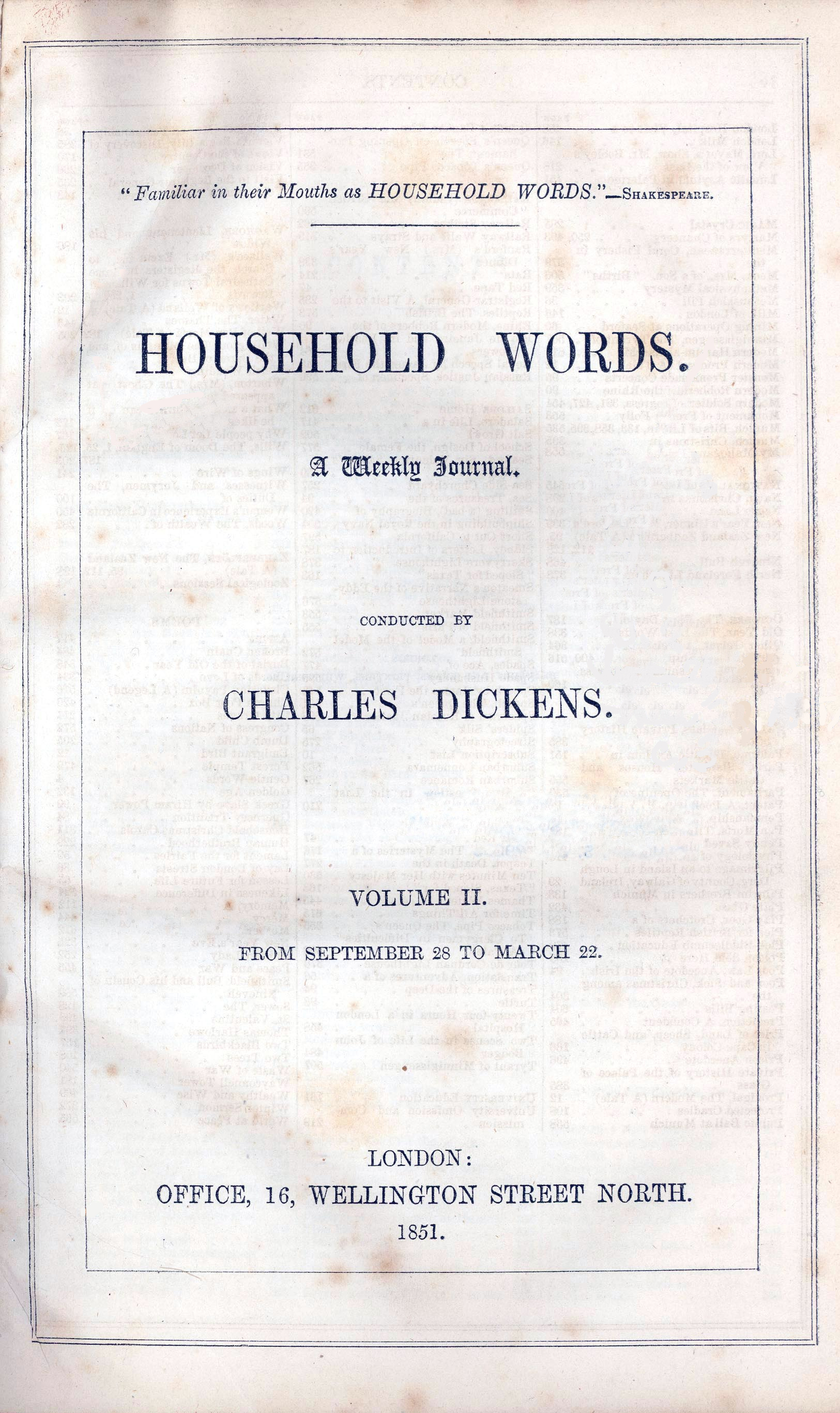
- Front cover of Vol. II, 28 September 1850– 22 March 1851
- Author: Editor: Charles Dickens
- Original title: Household Words, A Weekly Journal conducted by Charles Dickens
- Language: English
- Series: Weekly: 30 March 1850 – 28 May 1859
- Genre: Magazine
- Publisher: Bradbury & Evans
- Publication place: England
- Media type: Print
- Followed by: All the Year Round

Household Words was an English weekly magazine edited by Charles Dickens in the 1850s. It took its name from the line in Shakespeare's Henry V: "Familiar in his mouth as household words."

== History ==
During the planning stages, titles originally considered by Dickens included The Robin, The Household Voice, The Comrade, The Lever, and The Highway of Life.

Household Words was published every Saturday from March 1850 to May 1859. Each number cost a mere tuppence, for the sake of a wider readership. The publication's first issue carried a section covering the paper's principles, entitled "A Preliminary Word":

We aspire to live in the Household affections, and to be numbered among the Household thoughts, of our readers. We hope to be the comrade and friend of many thousands of people, of both sexes, and of all ages and conditions, on whose faces we may never look. We seek to bring to innumerable homes, from the stirring world around us, the knowledge of many social wonders, good and evil, that are not calculated to render any of us less ardently persevering in ourselves, less faithful in the progress of mankind, less thankful for the privilege of living in this summer-dawn of time.

— Charles Dickens

A longer version of the publication's principles appeared in newspapers such as The Argus in September 1850.

Theoretically, the paper championed the cause of the poor and working classes, but in fact it addressed itself almost exclusively to the middle class. Only the name of Dickens, the journal's "conductor", appeared; articles were unsigned (although authors of serialised novels were identified) and, in spite of its regularly featuring an "advertiser", the paper was unillustrated.

To boost slumping sales Dickens serialised his own novel, Hard Times, in weekly parts between 1 April and 12 August 1854. It had the desired effect, more than doubling the journal's circulation and encouraging the author, who remarked that he was, "three–parts mad, and the fourth delirious, with perpetual rushing at Hard Times".

That Dickens owned half of the company and his agents, John Forster and William Henry Wills, owned a further quarter of it was insurance that the author would have a free hand in the paper. Wills was also appointed associate editor and, in December 1849, Dickens's acquaintance, writer and poet Richard Henry Horne was appointed sub-editor at a salary of "five guineas a week". In 1859, however, owing to a dispute between Dickens and the publishers Bradbury and Evans over their refusal to print his "personal statement" regarding his divorce in their other magazine, Punch, publication ceased and Household Words was replaced by All the Year Round, over which Dickens had greater control.

The journal contained a mixture of fiction and nonfiction. A large amount of the non-fiction dealt with the social issues of the time.

== Serialized works ==
Prominent works that were serialised in Household Words include:

- A Child's History of England by Charles Dickens, published 25 January 1851 – 10 December 1853
- Cranford, North and South, and My Lady Ludlow by Elizabeth Gaskell
- "The Song of the Western Men" by Robert Stephen Hawker
- The Dead Secret and A Rogue's Life by Wilkie Collins

== Collaborative works ==
Dickens also collaborated with other staff writers on a number of Christmas stories and plays for seasonal issues of the magazine. These included:

- The Seven Poor Travellers in the Extra Christmas Number (14 December 1854) with Wilkie Collins, Eliza Lynn Linton, Adelaide Anne Procter (under the name "Mary Berwick"), and George Augustus Henry Sala.
- The Holly Tree Inn in the Extra Christmas Number (15 December 1855) with Wilkie Collins, William Howitt, Harriet Parr, and Adelaide Anne Procter.
- The Wreck of the Golden Mary in the Extra Christmas Number (6 December 1856) with Wilkie Collins, Percy Hetherington Fitzgerald, Adelaide Anne Procter, Harriet Parr, and Rev. James White.
- The Frozen Deep, a play written with Wilkie Collins and initially performed in the converted schoolroom of Dickens's London residence, Tavistock House (6 January 1857).
- The Lazy Tour of Two Idle Apprentices, a non-seasonal collaboration (3–31 October 1857) with Wilkie Collins
- The Perils of Certain English Prisoners in the Extra Christmas Number (7 December 1857) with Wilkie Collins
- "A House to Let" in the Extra Christmas Number (7 December 1858) with Elizabeth Gaskell and Adelaide Anne Procter.

Other contributors to Household Words included James Payn, John Hollingshead, Harriet Martineau, Frances Shayle George, William Duthie and Henry Morley.

A complete key to who wrote what and for how much in Household Words was compiled in 1973 by Anne Lohrli, using an analysis of the office account book maintained by Dickens's subeditor, W. H. Wills.
