= Alex Etel =

English actor

- Born: Alexander Nathan Etel; 19 September 1994 (age 31); Manchester, England
- Other name: Alexander Etel
- Education: Lum Head Primary School
- Occupation: Actor
- Years active: 2003–2010
- Partner(s): Laura Reid (2015–present; engaged)
- Children: 1

Alexander Nathan Etel (born 19 September 1994) is an English former actor most known for his lead roles in the films Millions (2004) and The Water Horse: Legend of the Deep (2007).

== Early life ==
Etel was born Alexander Nathan Etel on September 19, 1994, in a hospital on the outskirts of Manchester, the son of Nicholette Etel and Jason Hartley. Etel is the middle child of his family: he has a younger brother, Daniel Etel, and an older sister, Rebecca Etel. He attended Lum Head Primary School in Gatley in Stockport.

== Career ==
Etel's film debut was the starring role of Damian Cunningham in Millions, a 2004 family film directed by Danny Boyle. He played the lead in his second film, Jay Russell's The Water Horse: Legend of the Deep.

Etel played Harry Gregson in the five-part TV adaptation of Elizabeth Gaskell's Cranford, which was transmitted in the autumn of 2007 and co-starred Philip Glenister, Judi Dench, Eileen Atkins, Francesca Annis and Imelda Staunton. He reprised his role in the two-part second series entitled Return to Cranford. In 2009 he appeared in Julian Fellowes' adaptation of the children's ghost novel The Chimneys of Green Knowe. This film was named From Time to Time and Etel appeared opposite Maggie Smith, Timothy Spall, Hugh Bonneville and Dominic West.

According to his official website, as of February 2016, Etel's acting career is on hold while he attends university.

== Personal life ==
Etel began dating Laura Reid in September 2015. They became engaged in September 2021 after six years of dating. Together they have one child, a son (b. 2023).

== Filmography ==
| Year | Film | Role | Notes |
|---|---|---|---|
| 2004 | Millions | Damian Cunningham | Nominated—British Independent Film Award for Most Promising Newcomer; Nominated—Critics' Choice Award for Best Young Actor; Nominated—Saturn Award for Best Performance by a Younger Actor |
| 2007 | The Water Horse: Legend of the Deep | Angus MacMorrow | Nominated—Young Artist Award for Best Performance in a Feature Film-Leading Young Actor; Nominated—Saturn Award for Best Performance by a Younger Actor |
| 2007–2009 | Cranford | Harry Gregson | TV mini-series (7 episodes) |
| 2009 | From Time to Time | Tolly | |
| 2010 | Ways to Live Forever | Felix Stranger | |

== Appearances ==
| Year | Title | Notes |
|---|---|---|
| 2007 | Entertainment Tonight | TV series (1 episode: "27 December 2007") |
| 2008 | Richard and Judy | TV series (1 episode: "7 February 2008") |
