= Cranford (novel) =

1851–1853 novel by Elizabeth Gaskell

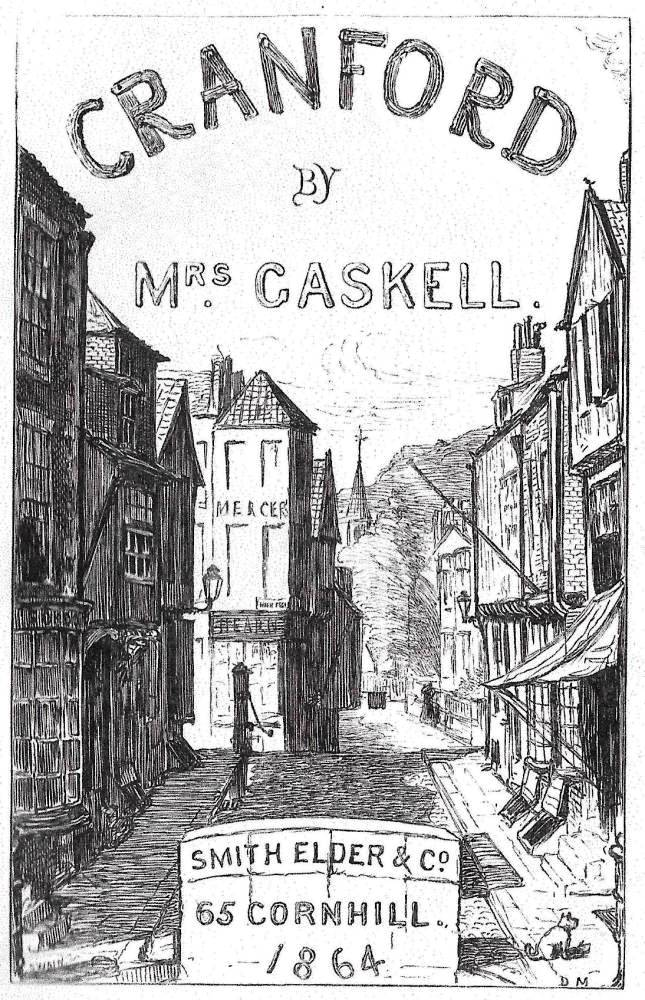
- The first illustrated edition of Cranford designed by George du Maurier, 1864
- Author: Elizabeth Gaskell
- Language: English
- Genre: Novel
- Publisher: Serial:Household Words
- Publication date: 1851–53 (serial), 1853 (book)
- Publication place: United Kingdom
- Media type: Print ()
- Preceded by: Mary Barton
- Followed by: North and South

Cranford is an episodic novel by English author Elizabeth Gaskell. (Note: She wrote as "Mrs Gaskell".) It first appeared in instalments in the magazine Household Words, and was then published with minor revisions as a book with the title Cranford in 1853. The work slowly became popular and from the start of the 20th century it saw a number of dramatic treatments for the stage, radio and TV.

== Background ==
The fictional Cranford is based on the small Cheshire town of Knutsford in which Elizabeth Gaskell grew up. She had already drawn on her childhood memories for an article published in America, "The Last Generation in England" (1849), and for the town of Duncombe which featured in her extended story "Mr. Harrison's Confessions" (1851). These accounts of life in a country town and the prevailing old-fashioned class snobbery there were carried over into what was originally intended simply as another story, published as "Our Society in Cranford" in the magazine Household Words in December 1851. Seeing the possibilities of a longer work in the piece, which eventually formed the first two chapters of her novel, Charles Dickens, the magazine's editor, encouraged the author to write more episodes.

Gaskell then added seven more episodes over the next 18 months, with an eight-month gap between the sections ending at what is now chapter 8 (written between December 1851 and April 1852) and the later sections (written between January and May 1853). During this period, she was also engaged in writing the three-volume novel Ruth, which was published in January 1853. Cranford soon followed its serialisation as a volume published by Chapman & Hall in June 1853, with a second printing in August and a US edition that month. Following a third UK printing in 1855 came a French translation in 1856 and a German translation in 1867. The book was not widely reviewed in Britain and it was not until the 1890s that it became popular.

One of the routes to the novel's growth in popularity was the policy of publishers to increase sales by providing lower-priced illustrated editions. The first of these in Cranford's case was issued by Smith, Elder & Co in 1864 with illustrations by George du Maurier, whose approach was to interpret scenes in contemporary terms. There was a change of emphasis in Hugh Thomson's 1891 illustrations, where the Cranford interiors and styles of dress are pictured as closer to the pre-industrial Regency period of Elizabeth Gaskell's memories. There was also an emotional shift from Du Maurier's psychological but compassionate depiction of people in limited circumstances to a greater emphasis on humour and sentimentality, a change of approach which was to prove influential on other illustrators for decades to come.

== Structure ==
The work is what The Athenaeum described as "a collection of sketches" on its appearance, affectionately delineating people and customs that were already becoming anachronisms. There is the continuity of the characters involved that provides unity, rather than a linear narrative. Indeed, the perspective moves back and forth in time as past memories are introduced to account for the present. Necessary distancing is provided by the narrator, Mary Smith, whose point of view is that of a younger woman from a very different background simply reporting her experiences and is not known by name for the majority of the novel. As the daughter of a businessman living in Manchester (which she calls Drumble in the novel) she only visits Cranford occasionally, a device which is made to account for the episodic nature of the narration.

Manchester was Gaskell's place of residence after her marriage when she wrote this novel. The difference between country town and industrial city is as much a function of time as of distance. Many of the personal details and stories, including that of the cow dressed in flannel, are based on remembered fact that had taken place years before. Acknowledging this in a letter to John Ruskin, Gaskell commented that she had included less than she knew for fear of being thought to exaggerate. The author's preoccupation with class in her fiction is reflected through Cranford, a town out of step with what was developing beyond its parish boundaries. In Cranford "the system that, ushered in by the growing industrial and urban economy, was coming to replace the traditional system of rank", was slower to arrive than the railway.

In the view of Jenny Uglow, the novel chronicles social change, moving from one where consideration of rank was the foremost regulator of behaviour and social relations to a more humane emphasis on responding to individual need. "The small social group begins to encompass those hitherto banned on grounds of class" as the female arbiters of society grow from their initial illusion that their conservative values are effective guardians of gentility to a realisation that "kindness and concern for each other" are a more effective basis of mutual support. It is a work of social criticism in terms of class and gender even though many critics have dismissed it as a work that is not consistent with the radicalism woven into her other works.

There is a subplot of British colonial activity in India with Peter Jenkyns (or the Aga Jenkyns), a long-lost brother to the Jenkyns family that is the focus of the novel. He spent most of his life in as a naval officer, a prisoner of war, and a resident. The Jenkyns family and Cranford residents are aware of his presence in India even though they do not know his story, and when his story of his time in India is told upon his return it has a significant impact on the plot. He is the most obvious way that the intensely local village is contrasted and situated within a global colonial world, but there are mentions of imperial fashion trends, a performance by a magician from the continent before a believed robbery occurs, a local bank collapse due to interconnected national economics, and Miss Matty's opening of a tea shop that sells colonially-acquired wares. Even though Cranford is an isolated village that resists modernity and progress, it is still vastly impacted by British imperialism in a multitude of ways.

== Synopsis ==
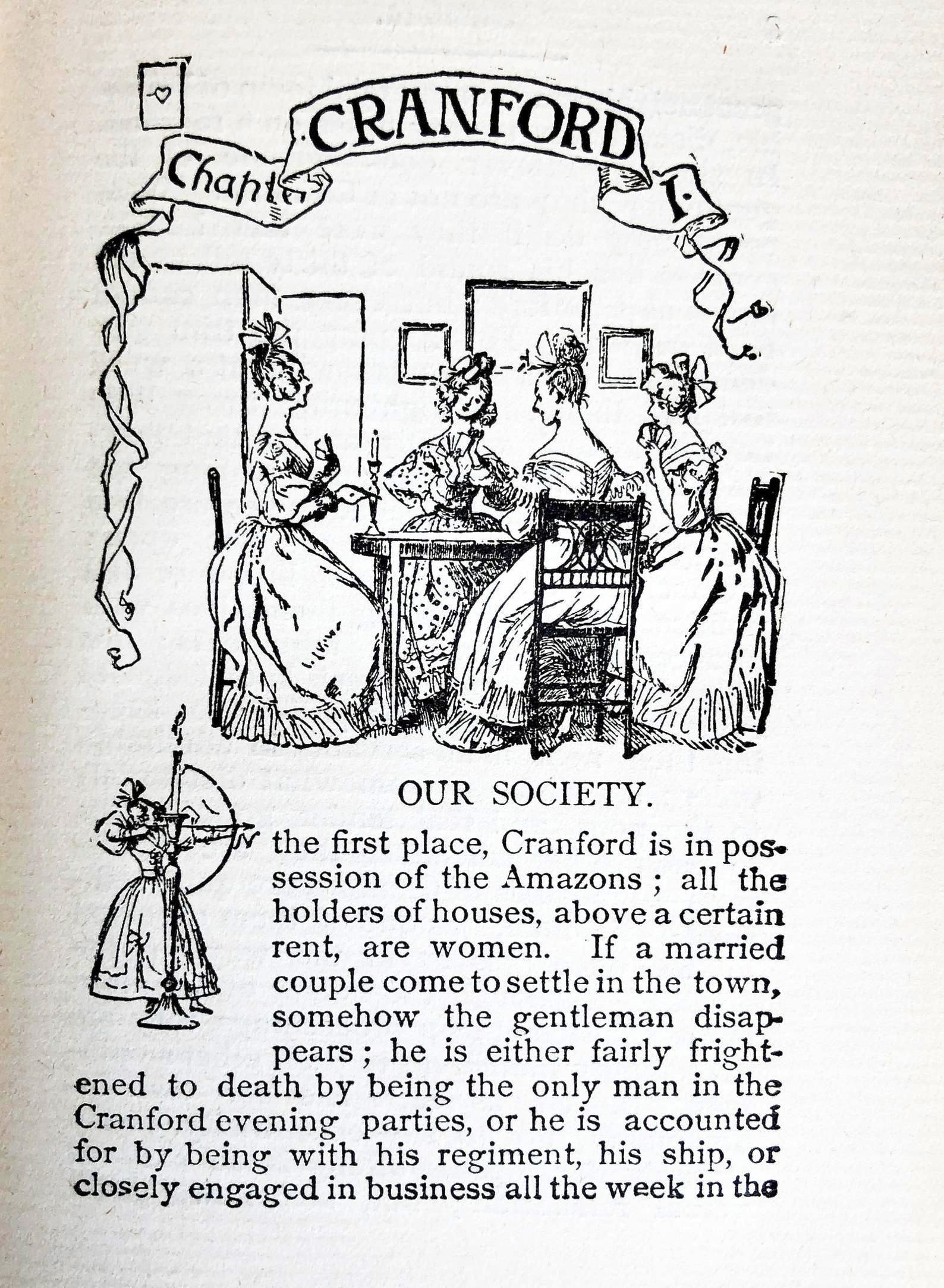
Hugh Thomson’s artwork for the 1891 edition of Cranford

The episodes described as taking place in Cranford were originally published under eight titles. The first, titled Our Society in Cranford and comprising the first two chapters of the eventual novel, introduces a female society of "Amazons", mostly widows or elderly unmarried women, living in genteel poverty and concealing the fact under what they call "elegant economy". These visit each other's houses according to a restrictive code of rules overseen by those among them most highly connected socially by birth or marriage. The arrival of Captain Brown, retired from the military and now a railway employee, disrupts their small world by his unguarded references to taboo subjects. Just as he gains their respect by his kindness and openness, he is killed rescuing a child from being run over by a train. His sickly elder daughter dies soon after and Jessie Brown is then freed to marry an old military admirer.

A Love Affair at Cranford (the eventual chapters 3–4) begins after the elder Miss Jenkyns' death, when her sister Matty is flustered by having to host a visit from her cousin, Major Jenkyns. Martha is hired as a new servant, whom Mary Smith trains and the two later encounter Mr Holbrook in the town. Miss Matty recounts how she was prevented from marrying him when young for reasons of social status but gladly accepts an invitation to dinner in his house. Shortly afterwards he takes a trip to Paris and dies on his return and Matty goes into mourning.

Memory at Cranford (chapters 5–6), in which the reading of old family letters tells the story of Matty's parents. She then recalls the closeness between herself and her brother Peter and how a piece of mischief so enraged their father that he beat his son in public. Peter then ran away from home and was last heard of leaving as a soldier to fight in India.

Visiting at Cranford (chapters 7–8) begins with Betty Barker's inviting the Cranford ladies to tea, at which social rules are broken but forgiven after all are persuaded to drink cherry brandy and Mrs Jamieson announces the coming stay of her elder brother's widow, Lady Glenmire. Tension follows the snobbery of Mrs Jamieson over this relationship, which is deflated when Lady Glenmire shows herself very approachable at a party given in her honour.

The Great Cranford Panic (chapters 9–11). The town is impressed by the arrival of the mysterious Signor Brunoni and attend his conjuring show. Gossip afterwards connects him with a spate of robberies that terrify the ladies. But he is later discovered lying ill in lodgings and turns out to be an ex-soldier named Samuel Brown. His wife then describes their time in India and how her little daughter was nursed to health there by a kind Englishman called Jenkyns. Mary Smith wonders whether this might have been Matty's lost brother and decides to make enquiries.

Stopped payment at Cranford (chapter 12–13). Mr Hoggins is called in to look after Signor Brunoni, where Lady Glenmire meets and becomes engaged to him. While out shopping, Matty hears the rumour that her bank may stop payment on its notes and, as an investor there, insists on paying in coin for a customer's purchase. The bankruptcy is confirmed next day.

Friends in need (chapter 14). Though Matty will soon be penniless and can no longer afford a maid, Martha refuses to leave. Instead she proposes marrying Jem Hearn and taking Matty in as her lodger. Miss Pole calls a meeting of the ladies and they agree to sacrifice some of their own income to support Matty, while getting Mary's father to pretend that it comes as a return on her investments.

A happy return to Cranford (chapters 15–16) After a successful sale of her belongings, Matty's house is taken over by Jem and Martha. There she uses the parlour to trade in tea at Mary's suggestion. This arrangement does not last for long since Peter arrives after Mary has contacted him, having made a fortune as a planter in India. Matty is delighted and Peter makes sure she remains in the esteem of the "Amazons" by becoming a favourite among them as a peace-maker and teller of tall stories.

== Characters ==
- Mary Smith – The narrator, a frequent visitor of the Jenkyns family and Miss Pole.
- Miss Deborah Jenkyns – The domineering elder daughter of the former rector.
- Miss Matty Jenkyns – The rector's younger daughter.
- Peter Jenkyns – The son of the family, who ran away from home and eventually settled in India.
- Miss Pole – The town gossip, Miss Matty's friend.
- The Honourable Mrs Jamieson – As daughter of a governor and the widowed daughter-in-law of a baron, she is considered Cranford's social arbiter.
- Mrs Forrester – Another widow who, as an officer's daughter and the widow of a major, is accepted into the Cranford social circle.
- Miss Fitz-Adam – Mr Hoggins' sister, a wealthy widow who is regarded by Mrs Jamieson as her social inferior.
- Lady Glenmire – Mrs. Jamieson's widowed sister-in-law, who does not share her social prejudices.
- Betty Barker – A retired milliner to the gentry, once employed as a maid by Mrs Jamieson.
- Captain Brown – A half-pay army captain, who comes to live at Cranford with his two daughters.
- Thomas Holbrook – Miss Pole's cousin, a successful farmer who was once Miss Matty's suitor.
- Dr Hoggins – As the Cranford surgeon he is of uncertain social status and is discriminated against because of his "vulgar" surname.
- Mr Smith – A wealthy Drumble businessman and Mary's father.
- Martha – Miss Matty's devoted maid.
- Jem Hearn – A joiner, Martha's fiancé.
- Mr Mulliner – Mrs. Jamieson's butler.
- Signor Brunoni – Stage name of the travelling magician, a former soldier.
- Signora Brunoni – His wife, who accompanied him when his regiment was sent to India.

== Sequels and adaptations ==
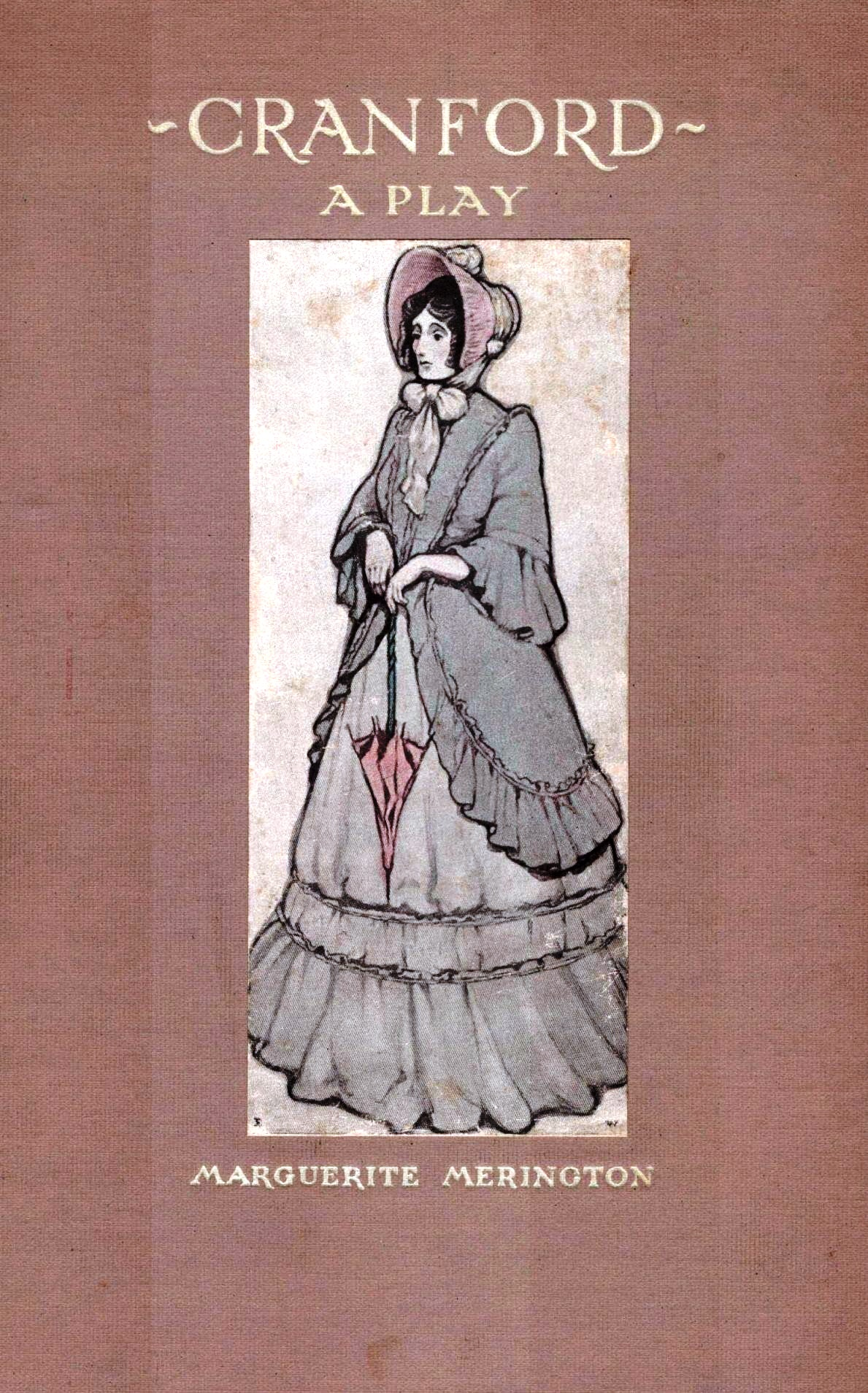
Marguerite Merington's dramatic adaptation, 1905

Elizabeth Gaskell had not done entirely with Knutsford with the publication of Cranford. Thomas Higgins, an 18th-century highwayman and former inhabitant of the town, was made the subject of "The Squire’s Story", published in the Christmas 1853 number of Household Words, although it was there set in the fictitious Derbyshire town of Barford. Then years later she made the arrival of the hoop skirt the subject of an additional farcical episode in "The Cage at Cranford", published by Dickens in his new magazine All the Year Round in November 1863.

Theatrical adaptations of the novel began at the turn of the century, the first few of which were produced in the US. Among these were Alice Byington's Cranford Dames, a play in five scenes (New York, 1900), and Marguerite Merington's Cranford: A Play, a three-act comedy set in the time of William IV, (New York 1905). Some of the later British examples were merely dramatic episodes and included "The Bank Breaks" by Arthur Phosphor Mallam (1872–1948), based on chapters 13–15 (1912); Guy Pertwee's "A Cranford Card Party" (1913); Harry Brighouse's 'Cranford sketch', "Followers" (1915); and Amy M. Robertson's "The Panic from Cranford" (1930), based on chapter 10. 1930 also saw the tangential 'play for boys', Higgins, the Highwayman of Cranford, by Ronald Gow.

In America the novel was adapted for NBC radio in 1946. Martyn Coleman's three-act play for theatre, first produced in 1951, was adapted for British television that year. Subsequently, a four-part television adaptation from the novel was broadcast by BBC in 1972. There was also a British musical based on the novel staged in 1975 and another broadcast by Thames Television in 1976.

In 2007 the five-part television series that appeared under the title Cranford was in reality elided with three other works by Gaskell: My Lady Ludlow, Mr. Harrison's Confessions and The Last Generation in England. A sequel, Return to Cranford, was broadcast in 2009 in the UK and in 2010 in the US.

== Bibliography ==
- Birch, Dinah. introduction to Oxford University Press edition of Cranford (2011)
- Chadwick, Esther Alice. Mrs Gaskell: Haunts, Homes, and Stories (London 1910)
- Keating, Peter. "Introduction" to the Penguin edition of Cranford (1976)
- Recchio, Thomas. Elizabeth Gaskell’s Cranford: a publishing history, Ashgate 2009
