= Trisha Edwards =

- Other names: Trish Edwards, Tricia Edwards
- Occupation: Set decorator
- Years active: 1980–2009

Trisha Edwards is an Academy Award-nominated set decorator. She was nominated at the 77th Academy Awards in the category of Best Art Direction for her work on the film Finding Neverland. She shared her nomination with Gemma Jackson.

== Selected filmography ==
- Excalibur (1981)
- The French Lieutenant's Woman (1981)
- Moll Flanders (1996)
- Iris (2001)
- Finding Neverland (2004)
