= The Last Generation in England =

Non-fiction article by Elizabeth Gaskell

"The Last Generation in England" is a non-fiction article by Elizabeth Gaskell, published in the American Sartain's Union Magazine in July 1849, relating memories of a small country town in the generation prior to her own. As such, it is seen as the real-life background for her 1853 novel Cranford. Recognising she was living through a time of great and rapid change, Gaskell was inspired to write the article by reading that the author Robert Southey had himself once considered composing a history of English domestic life.
