= British Academy Television Craft Award for Best Production Design =

Award for technical achievements in TV

British Academy Television Craft Award
- Country: United Kingdom
- Presented by: British Academy of Film and Television Arts
- First award: 1966
- Currently held by: Philippa Mumford for Juice (2026)
- Website: http://www.bafta.org/

The British Academy Television Craft Award for Best Production Design is one of the categories presented by the British Academy of Film and Television Arts (BAFTA) within the British Academy Television Craft Awards, the craft awards were established in 2000 with their own, separate ceremony as a way to spotlight technical achievements, without being overshadowed by the main production categories. According to the BAFTA website, for a programme to be eligible to this category it "should contain a significant amount of original design."

The category was gone through some name changes:

- From 1955 to 1965, an individual award named Best Designer was presented.
- From 1966 to 2000 it was presented as Best Design.
- Since 2001 it has been presented as Best Production Design.

== Winners and nominees ==
=== 1950s ===
Best Designer

Year	Recipient(s)	Title
1955	Michael Yates	
1956	Bruce Angrave	
1957	Reece Pemberton	
1958	Stephen Taylor	
1959	Stephen Bundy	

=== 1960s ===
Best Designer

Year	Recipient(s)	Title
1960	Clifford Hatts	
1961	Frederick Pusey	
1962	Voytek	
1963	Eileen Diss	
1964	Richard Henry	
1965	Richard Wilmot	

Best Design

Year	Title	Recipient(s)
1966	The Tea Party; Progress To The Park; Summer Of The 17th Doll; The Tap On The Shoulder; Ashes To Ashes; Auto Stop	Eileen Diss
1966	The Bachelors; Giants on Saturday; No Baby, No Baby At All; The Rules of the Game	John Clements
1966	The Incident; The Importance of Being Earnest; Hothouse; The Gaming Book; The Hunter; Time and Mr Maddingly	Assheton Gorton
1966	Parade's End (Trilogy); Sherlock Holmes (1 Episode); The Navigators; No Trams to Lime Street; The Kidders	Richard Wilmot
1967	Tony Abbott	
1968	Julia Trevelyan Oman	
1969	The Portrait of a Lady	Roy Oxley

=== 1970s ===
Year	Title	Recipient(s)
1970	Otello; Rembrandt; The Vortex	Tony Abbott
1970	The Borderers	Colin Shaw
1970	Louise; Better Dead; Charley's Aunt; The Marquise	Eileen Diss
1970	This Is Tom Jones	Brian Bartholomew
1971	The Six Wives Of Henry VIII; Biography: Beethoven; Biography: I Measured The Skies - Kepler; Put Out More Flags	Peter Seddon
1971	Germinal	Don Homfray
1971	The Roads to Freedom	Spencer Chapman
1971	Uncle Vanya	Eileen Diss
1972	The Rivals of Sherlock Holmes	Design Team
1972	Die Fledermaus; Cider With Rosie	Eileen Diss
1972	The Onedin Line	Oliver Bayldon
1972	Tartuffe	Fanny Taylor
1973	War and Peace	Don Homfray
1973	The Onedin Line	Oliver Bayldon and the Design Team
1973	Upstairs, Downstairs	John Clements
1974	An Afternoon At The Festival; Now She Lies There; Pygmalion; Alice Through The Looking Glass; Trouble In Tahiti	Eileen Diss
1974	The Bröntes of Haworth	Alan Pickford
1974	Country Matters	Design Team
1974	Vienna 1900	Don Homfray
1975	The Stanley Baxter Big Picture Show	Bill McPherson
1975	Jennie	Frederick Pusey, Mike Hall
1975	Jennie	Jane Robinson, Jill Silverside
1975	The Pallisers	Raymond Cusick, Tim Harvey
1976	Edward VII	Henry Graveney, Anthony Waller
1976	Days of Hope	Martin Johnson
1976	The Stanley Baxter Moving Picture Show Part III	Bill McPherson
1976	Upstairs, Downstairs	Sheila Jackson
1977	I, Claudius	Tim Harvey
1977	The Duchess of Duke Street	Raymond Cusick, Paul Joel
1977	Rock Follies	Rod Stratford, Alex Clarke
1977	When the Boat Comes In	Richard Morris, Bernard Lloyd-Jones, Sue Spence, Oliver Bayldon, Peter Brachacki
1978	Hard Times	Roy Stonehouse
1978	The Duchess of Duke Street	Raymond Cusick, Victor Meredith, Tony Thorpe
1978	Love for Lydia	John Clements, Frank Nerini
1978	The Muppet Show	David Chandler, Bryan Holgate
1979	Edward & Mrs. Simpson	Allan Cameron, Martyn Hebert
1979	Lillie	Bryan Bagge, Richard Dunn, Roger Hall
1979	Pennies from Heaven	Tim Harvey, Bruce Macadie
1979	The Voyage of Charles Darwin	Colin Shaw

=== 1980s ===
Year	Title	Recipient(s)
1980	Testament of Youth	Sally Hulke
1980	Crime and Punishment	Tony Abbott
1980	Prince Regent	Barry Newbury, Barrie Dobbins
1980	Tinker Tailor Soldier Spy	Austen Spriggs
1981	Thérèse Raquin	David Myerscough-Jones
1981	Blade on the Feather	Andrew Drummond
1981	Cream in My Coffee	John Emery
1981	Love in a Cold Climate	David Marshall, Robert Ide
1982	Brideshead Revisited	Peter Phillips
1982	Pygmalion; Miss Morison’s Ghosts; The Potting Shed	Eileen Diss
1982	The Borgias	Tim Harvey
1982	Winston Churchill: The Wilderness Years	Roger Murray-Leach
1983	Barchester Chronicles; The Bell	Chris Pemsel
1983	The Red Signal; The Agatha Christie Hour: The Girl in the Train; A Voyage Round My Father	David Marshall
1983	Nicholas Nickleby	John Napier
1983	Smiley's People	Austen Spriggs
1984	An Englishman Abroad	Stuart Walker
1984	Reilly, Ace of Spies	Roger Hall
1984	Saigon: Year of the Cat	David Marshall, Robin Parker
1984	Waters of the Moon; The Blue Dress; Farmers Arms	Geoff Powell
1985	Threads	Christopher Robilliard
1985	The Far Pavilions	Robert Laing
1985	Tenko	Ken Ledsham
1985	The Jewel in the Crown	Alan Pickford, Vic Symonds
1985	Doctor Fischer Of Geneva	Austen Spriggs
1986	Bleak House	Tim Harvey
1986	Tender is the Night	Derek Dodd
1986	Silas Marner	Gerry Scott
1986	Edge of Darkness	Graeme Thomson
1987	The Insurance Man	Geoff Powell
1987	The Singing Detective	Jim Clay
1987	Hotel Du Lac	Barbara Gosnold
1987	The Monocled Mutineer	Christopher Robilliard
1987	Lost Empires	Roy Stonehouse, David Buxton
1987	The Return of Sherlock Holmes	Tim Wilding
1988	Fortunes of War	Tim Harvey
1988	Vanity Fair	Gavin Davies
1988	Porterhouse Blue	Eileen Diss
1988	Tutti Frutti	Bob Smart
1988	Blackadder the Third	Antony Thorpe
1989	Christabel	Jim Clay
1989	Talking Heads	Tony Burrough
1989	A Very British Coup	Grant Hicks
1989	Tumbledown	Geoff Powell

=== 1990s ===
Year	Title	Recipient(s)	Broadcaster
1990	Traffik	Martyn Herbert, Hans Zillman	Channel 4
1990	The Ginger Tree	Michael Young	BBC One
1990	The Woman in Black	Jon Bunker	ITV
1990	Agatha Christie's Poirot (for "Episodes 1,2,5,8 & 10")	Rob Harris	ITV
1990	The Chronicles of Narnia	Alan Spalding	BBC
1991	Portrait of a Marriage	Stuart Walker	BBC Two
1991	House of Cards	Ken Ledsham	BBC One
1991	Jeeves and Wooster	Eileen Diss	ITV
1991	The Chronicles of Narnia	Alan Spalding	BBC
1992	Jeeves and Wooster	Eileen Diss	ITV
1992	Jim Henson's Greek Myths	John Beard	Channel 4
1992	Clarissa	Gerry Scott	BBC
1992	Prime Suspect	Roy Stonehouse	ITV
1993	Screen Two: Memento Mori	Oliver Bayldon	BBC Two
1993	Hostages	Stephen Fineren	ITV
1993	The Borrowers	Sophie Becher	BBC Two
1993	The Vampyr: A Soap Opera	Jim Grant	BBC Two
1994	The Buddha of Suburbia	Roger Cann	BBC Two
1994	Prime Suspect 3	Chris Truelove	ITV
1994	The Borrowers	Sophie Becher	BBC Two
1994	Scarlet and Black	Stuart Walker	BBC One
1995	Dandelion Dead	Voytek	ITV
1995	Seaforth	Chris Edwards	BBC One
1995	A Dark-Adapted Eye	Paul Munting	BBC One
1996	Persuasion	William Dudley, Brian Sykes	BBC Two
1996	The Buccaneers	Tony Burrough	ITV
1996	The Hanging Gale	Tim Hutchinson	BBC One
1996	Cold Comfort Farm	Malcolm Thornton	BBC
1997	Gulliver's Travels	Roger Hall	Channel 4
1997	Rhodes	Maurice Cain	BBC One
1997	The Tenant of Wildfell Hall	Sarah Greenwood	BBC One
1997	The Fortunes and Misfortunes of Moll Flanders	Stephen Fineren	ITV
1998	The Woman in White	Alice Normington	BBC One
1998	A Dance to the Music of Time	Eileen Diss	Channel 4
1998	Jonathan Creek	John Asbridge, Jonathan Taylor	BBC One
1998	Tom Jones	Roger Cann	BBC One
1999	Our Mutual Friend	Malcolm Thornton	BBC Two
1999	Hornblower: The Even Chance	Andrew Mollo	ITV
1999	Far from the Madding Crowd	Adrian Smith	BBC Two
1999	Alice Through the Looking Glass	Anne Tilby	Channel 4

=== 2000s ===
Best Design

Year	Title	Recipient(s)	Broadcaster
2000	Wives and Daughters	Gerry Scott	BBC One
2000	Hornblower	Rob Harris	ITV
2000	Great Expectations	Alice Normington	BBC Two
2000	Warriors	Phil Roberson	BBC One

Best Production Design

Year	Title	Recipient(s)	Broadcaster
2001	Longitude	Eileen Diss, Chris Lowe	Channel 4
2001	The Scarlet Pimpernel	Maurice Cain	BBC One
2001	Anna Karenina	Rob Harris	Channel 4
2001	Gormenghast	Christopher Hobbs	BBC Two
2002	The Way We Live Now	Gerry Scott	BBC One
2002	The Life and Adventures of Nicholas Nickleby	James Merifield	Channel 4
2002	Love in a Cold Climate	Gerry Scott	BBC One
2002	Othello	Malcolm Thornton	ITV
2003	The Gathering Storm	Luciana Arrighi	BBC Two
2003	Foyle’s War	Claire Kenny, Maurice Cain	ITV
2003	Shackleton	Michael Howells	Channel 4
2003	White Teeth	Alice Normington	Channel 4
2004	The Lost Prince	John-Paul Kelly	BBC One
2004	The Forsyte Saga	Stephen Fineren	ITV
2004	Charles II: The Power and the Passion	Sarah Greenwood	BBC One
2004	Cambridge Spies	Mike Gunn	BBC Two
2005	Sex Traffic	Candida Otton	Channel 4
2005	North and South	Simon Elliott	BBC One
2005	Spooks	Stevie Herbert, Robert Foster	BBC One
2005	Blackpool	Grenville Horner	BBC One
2006	Bleak House	Simon Elliott	BBC One
2006	Rome	Joseph Bennett	BBC Two
2006	To the Ends of the Earth	Donal Woods	BBC Two
2006	Elizabeth I	Eve Stewart	Channel 4
2007	An Audience with Take That... Live!	Bill Laslett	ITV
2007	Longford	Michael Pickwoad	Channel 4
2007	Jane Eyre	Grenville Horner	BBC One
2007	Life on Mars	Brian Sykes	BBC One
2008	Cranford	Donal Woods	BBC One
2008	My Boy Jack	Dave Arrowsmith	ITV
2008	Life on Mars	Matthew Gant	BBC One
2008	Britz	Pat Campbell	Channel 4
2009	Wallander	Jacqueline Abrahams	BBC One
2009	The Curse of Steptoe	Patrick Bill	BBC Four
2009	The Devil's Whore	Rob Harris	Channel 4
2009	Little Dorrit	James Merifield	BBC One

=== 2010s ===
Year	Title	Recipient(s)	Broadcaster
2010	Gracie!	Claire Kenny	BBC Four
2010	Wallander	Jacqueline Abrahams	BBC One
2010	Red Riding 1974	Christina Casali	Channel 4
2010	An Englishman in New York	Beth Mickle	ITV
2011	Misfits	Tom Bowyer	E4
2011	Sherlock: A Study in Pink	Arwel Wyn Jones	BBC One
2011	Eric and Ernie	Pat Campbell	BBC Two
2011	Downton Abbey	Donal Woods	ITV
2012	Great Expectations	David Roger	BBC One
2012	Appropriate Adult	Pat Campbell	ITV
2012	Downton Abbey	Judy Farr, Donal Woods	ITV
2012	Black Mirror: 15 Million Merits	Joel Collins, Daniel May	Channel 4
2013	The Girl	Darryl Hammer	BBC Two
2013	Downton Abbey	Donal Woods	ITV
2013	The Hour	Eve Stewart	BBC Two
2013	Parade's End	Martin Childs	BBC Two
2014	Ripper Street	Mark Geraghty	BBC One
2014	Broadchurch	Catrin Meredydd	ITV
2014	Burton and Taylor	John Stevenson	BBC Four
2014	Peaky Blinders	Grant Montgomery	BBC Two
2015	Penny Dreadful	Jonathan Mckinstry, Philip Murphy	Sky Atlantic
2015	Peaky Blinders	Grant Montgomery	BBC Two
2015	That Day We Sang	Tom Burton	BBC Two
2015	Tommy Cooper: Not Like That, Like This	Candida Otton	ITV
2016	Jonathan Strange & Mr Norrell	David Roger	BBC One
2016	Fortitude	Gemma Jackson	Sky Atlantic
2016	This Is England '90	Janey Levick	Channel 4
2016	Dickensian	Michael Ralph	BBC One
2017	War & Peace	Chris Roope	BBC One
2017	The Crown	Martin Childs	Netflix
2017	Rillington Place	Pat Campbell	BBC One
2017	The Night Manager	Tom Burton, Barbara H. Skelding	BBC One
2018	Game of Thrones	Deborah Riley, Rob Cameron	HBO
2018	USS Callister (Black Mirror)	Joel Collins, Phil Sims	Netflix
2018	The Crown	Martin Childs, Alison Harvey	Netflix
2018	The State	Pat Campbell	Channel 4
2019	Patrick Melrose	Tom Burton	Sky Atlantic
2019	A Very English Scandal	Helen Scott	BBC One
2019	Killing Eve	Kristian Milsted	BBC One
2019	The Little Drummer Girl	Maria Djurkovic, Tatiana Macdonald	BBC One

=== 2020s ===
Year	Title	Recipient(s)	Broadcaster
2020	Chernobyl	Luke Hull, Claire Levinson-Gendler	Sky Atlantic
2020	Killing Eve	Laurence Dorman, Linda Wilson	BBC One
2020	The Crown	Martin Childs, Alison Harvey	Netflix
2020	Sex Education	Samantha Harley, Miri Katz	Netflix
2021	Small Axe	Helen Scott	BBC One
2021	Gangs of London	Matt Gant and Megan Bosaw	Sky Atlantic
2021	Sex Education	Samantha Harley and Alexandra Slade	Netflix
2021	His Dark Materials	Joel Collins	BBC One
2022	Landscapers	Cristina Casali	Sky Atlantic
2022	Vigil	Tom Sayer	BBC One
2022	The Pursuit of Love	Cristina Casali	BBC One
2022	The Serpent	François-Renaud Labarthe	BBC One
2023	Don't Hug Me I'm Scared	Becky Sloan, Joe Pelling	Channel 4
2023	The Essex Serpent	Alice Normington	Apple TV+
2023	The English	Chris Roope	BBC Two
2023	Pistol	Kave Quinn, Tim Blake, Stella Fox, Penny Crawfold, Emily Norris	Disney+
2024	Silo	Gavin Bocquet, Amanda Bernstein	Apple TV+
2024	Nolly	Ben Smith	ITVX
2024	The Long Shadow	Anna Higginson	ITV
2024	Black Mirror: "Demon 79"	Udo Kramer	Netflix
2025	Rivals	Dominic Hyman	Disney+
2025	Masters of the Air	Chris Seagers	Apple TV+
2025	Breathtaking	Ashleigh Jeffers	ITV1
2025	The Day of the Jackal	Richard Bullock	Sky Atlantic
2026	Juice	Philippa Mumford	BBC Three
2026	Andor	Luke Hull, Rebecca Alleway, Toby Britton	Disney+
2026	A Thousand Blows	Tom Burton, Grant Bailey, Barbara Herman-Skelding	Disney+
2026	Trespasses	Gillian Devenney	Channel 4

== See also ==
- Primetime Emmy Award for Outstanding Production Design for a Narrative Contemporary Program (One Hour or More)
- Primetime Emmy Award for Outstanding Production Design for a Narrative Program (Half-Hour or Less)
- Primetime Emmy Award for Outstanding Production Design for a Narrative Period or Fantasy Program (One Hour or More)
