= British Academy Television Craft Award for Best Photography & Lighting: Fiction =

Award for technical achievements in TV

British Academy Television Craft Award
- Country: United Kingdom
- Presented by: British Academy of Film and Television Arts
- First award: 1992
- Currently held by: Ryan Kernaghan for Trespasses (2026)
- Website: http://www.bafta.org/

The British Academy Television Craft Award for Best Photography & Lighting: Fiction is one of the categories presented by the British Academy of Film and Television Arts (BAFTA) within the British Academy Television Craft Awards, the craft awards were established in 2000 with their own, separate ceremony as a way to spotlight technical achievements, without being overshadowed by the main production categories. According to the BAFTA website, for this category the "eligibility is limited to the director of photography."

Several categories were presented to recognize photography and lighting in television programming:

- From 1978 to 1991 Best Film Cameramen was presented.
- From 1978 to 1982 Best Television Cameramen was presented.
- In 1978 Best Special Lighting Effects was presented.
- From 1978 to 1980 Best Television Lighting was presented.
- From 1981 to 1994 Best Video Lighting was presented.

In 1992, those categories transformed in two, Best Film or Video Photography - Fiction/Entertainment and Best Film or Video Photography - Factual until 1994 when they would be renamed for the last time, resulting in Best Photography & Lighting: Fiction and Best Photography: Factual respectively.

== Winners and nominees ==
=== 1970s ===
Best Film Cameramen

| Year | Recipient(s) | Title |
|---|---|---|
| 1978 | Chris Menges | Last Summer; Chicago Streets |
| 1978 | Graham Barker | Goodbye Longfellow Road |
| 1978 | Peter Bartlett | Eustace And Hilda; The Three Hostages; A Hymn from Jim |
| 1978 | Philip Bonham Carter | Omnibus; Money On The Wall |
| 1978 | John Else | The Long Search |
| 1978 | Peter Hall | Marie Curie; Ripping Yarns; Count Dracula |
| 1978 | John Hooper | Omnibus: A Day in the Garden |
| 1978 | Peter Jackson | A Chink In The Wall |
| 1978 | Kenneth MacMillan | A Royal Heritage |
| 1978 | Tony Maynard, Jeff Shepherd | Love for Lydia |
| 1978 | Philip Meheux | Spend, Spend, Spend |
| 1978 | Arthur Smith | Living On The Land |
| 1978 | Alan Stevens | Open University: Mass Communications and Society - ABC in Kansas City |
| 1978 | Ian Stone | For Continued Excellence Years Of Work |
| 1978 | George Jesse Turner | The Christians; World in Action |
| 1978 | Colin Waldeck | Chronicle: The Acquisitors |
| 1978 | David Watkin, Armando Nannuzi | Jesus of Nazareth |
| 1978 | David Wood | Blind Love |
| 1979 | David Whitson, Maurice Tibbles | The Voyage of Charles Darwin |
| 1979 | Elmer Cossey | The Lost Boys |
| 1979 | Mike Fash | The One and Only Phyllis Dixey |
| 1979 | Chris Menges | Opium: The White Powder Opera |

Best Television Cameramen

| Year | Recipient(s) | Title |
|---|---|---|
| 1978 | Albert Almond, Roy Easton | Rock Follies of '77 |
| 1978 | Dick Bunn | Glyndebourne Opera |
| 1978 | David Gautier | The Mayor of Casterbridge |
| 1978 | Mike Hobbs | Thames OB's and OB Drama |
| 1978 | Dave Mutton | Pennies from Heaven |
| 1978 | Dave Taylor | Brass Tacks |
| 1979 | John Chapman | The Kenny Everett Video Show (Inserts) |
| 1979 | Albert Almond, Roy Easton | Edward & Mrs. Simpson |
| 1979 | Derek Doe | Lillie |
| 1979 | Dave Mutton | Pennies from Heaven |

Best Special Lighting Effects

| Year | Title | Recipient(s) |
|---|---|---|
| 1978 | Rock Follies of '77 | Bob Simmons, Malcolm Harrison |

Best Television Lighting

| Year | Title | Recipient(s) |
|---|---|---|
| 1978 | Macbeth | John Treays |
| 1978 | Hard Times | Wilf Batty |
| 1978 | The Ambassadors | Denis Channon |
| 1978 | Ghosts | Bob Grey |
| 1978 | Rock Follies of '77 | Malcolm Harrison, Bob Simmons |
| 1978 | Kilvert's Diary | David Jackson |
| 1978 | Love for Lydia | Colin Innes-Hopkins, Trevor Saunders |
| 1978 | Count Dracula | Howard King |
| 1978 | Three Weeks; Moths | Bill Lee |
| 1978 | Tommy Steele and a Show | David Motture |
| 1978 | Anna Karenina; Married Love | John Summers |
| 1978 | Marie Curie | Clive Thomas |
| 1978 | St Paul’s Cathedral - A Day of Celebration | Harry Thomas |
| 1978 | The Ghosts of Motley Hall | Mike Thompson |
| 1979 | The Lost Boys | Sam Barclay |
| 1979 | Edward & Mrs. Simpson | Bill Lee, Malcolm Harrison |
| 1979 | Pennies from Heaven | Dave Sydenham |
| 1979 | Lillie | Bert Wilkins, Colin Innes-Hopkins |

=== 1980s ===
Best Film Cameramen

| Year | Recipient(s) | Title |
|---|---|---|
| 1980 | Tony Pierce Roberts | Tinker Tailor Soldier Spy |
| 1980 | Nat Crosby | Katie, The Year Of The Child; Blue Remembered Hills; Long Distance Information |
| 1980 | Maurice Fisher and Camera Team | Life on Earth |
| 1980 | John Tiley, Colin Munn | Testament of Youth |
| 1981 | Tony Pierce-Roberts, John Else | Caught on a Train |
| 1981 | Derek Banks | Strangeways |
| 1981 | Peter Hannan | Blade on the Feather |
| 1981 | Wolfgang Suschitzky | Staying On; Worzel Gummidge |
| 1982 | Nat Crosby | Autumn Sunshine; Going Gently |
| 1982 | Ray Goode | Brideshead Revisited |
| 1982 | Norman Langley | Winston Churchill: The Wilderness Years |
| 1982 | Peter Middleton | The South Bank Show: Nickleby and Company |
| 1982 | Ian Wilson | The Flame Trees of Thika |
| 1983 | Kenneth MacMillan | Smiley's People |
| 1983 | Nat Crosby | Intensive Care; Soft Targets; Ballroom of Romance; Cruel Garden |
| 1983 | Chris Menges | Walter; Looks and Smiles; East 103rd Street |
| 1983 | Tony Pierce-Roberts | P'tang, Yang, Kipperbang; A Voyage Round My Father |
| 1984 | Nat Crosby | An Englishman Abroad/Farmers Arms |
| 1984 | Jim Howlett | Saigon, Year of the Cat |
| 1984 | Peter Jessop | Reilly, Ace of Spies |
| 1984 | Ernest Vincze | Kennedy |
| 1985 | Andrew Dunn | Threads |
| 1985 | Jack Cardiff | The Far Pavilions |
| 1985 | Ray Goode | The Jewel in the Crown |
| 1985 | Ken Westbury | Doctor Fischer of Geneva |
| 1986 | Andrew Dunn | Edge of Darkness |
| 1986 | Kenneth MacMillan | Bleak House |
| 1986 | Hugh Miles, Martin Saunders | Kingdom of The Ice Bear |
| 1986 | Ken Westbury | Tender is the Night |
| 1987 | Nat Crosby | The Insurance Man |
| 1987 | Andrew Dunn | The Monocled Mutineer |
| 1987 | Kenneth MacMillan | Day After the Fair |
| 1987 | Kenneth MacMillan | Hotel Du Lac |
| 1987 | Mike Reed | Paradise Postponed |
| 1987 | Ken Westbury | The Singing Detective |
| 1988 | Phil Agland | Baka: People of the Rain Forest |
| 1988 | Elmer Cossey | A Perfect Spy |
| 1988 | David Feig | Fortunes of War |
| 1988 | Dick Pope | Porterhouse Blue |
| 1989 | Andrew Dunn | Tumbledown |
| 1989 | Remi Adefarasin | Christabel |
| 1989 | Camera Team | Supersense |
| 1989 | Ernie Vincze | A Very British Coup |

Best Television Cameramen

| Year | Recipient(s) | Title |
|---|---|---|
| 1980 | John Chapman | Light Weight Camerawork |
| 1980 | Peter Coombs | Macbeth |
| 1980 | Geoff Feld | Testament of Youth; Suez 1956 |
| 1980 | Rodney Taylor | Prince Regent |
| 1981 | Geoff Feld | The Merchant of Venice; The Fatal Spring; We, The Accused |
| 1981 | Ron Green | Dr Jekyll and Mr Hyde; Thérèse Raquin |
| 1981 | Dave Mutton | Pride and Prejudice |
| 1981 | Rod Taylor | Oppenheimer; To Serve Them All My Days |
| 1982 | Jim Atkinson | All's Well That Ends Well; Othello; Timon of Athens; Troilus and Cressida |
| 1982 | Geoff Feld | The Cherry Orchard |
| 1982 | Dave Mutton | The Journal of Bridget Hitler |
| 1982 | Dave Ramsey | Pygmalion; Like I've Never Been Gone |

Best Television Lighting

| Year | Title | Recipient(s) |
|---|---|---|
| 1980 | Testament of Youth; Matilda's England | Dave Sydenham |
| 1980 | Macbeth; Rumpole of the Bailey | Louis Bottone |
| 1980 | Crime and Punishment; Suez 1956 | Howard King |
| 1980 | Churchill and the Generals | Nigel Wright |

Best Video Lighting

| Year | Title | Recipient(s) |
|---|---|---|
| 1981 | Thérèse Raquin; Dr Jekyll and Mr Hyde | Howard King |
| 1981 | The Merchant of Venice | Dennis Channon |
| 1981 | We, The Accused; Pride and Prejudice | Dave Sydenham |
| 1981 | Oppenheimer | Clive Thomas |
| 1981 | The Taming of the Shrew | John Treays |
| 1982 | The Cherry Orchard: The Journal of Bridget Hitler | Howard King |
| 1982 | Pygmalion; Eden End; Cupid's Darts | Brian Hilton |
| 1982 | Tenko | Alan Horne |
| 1982 | The Borgias | Dave Sydenham |
| 1983 | La Ronde; John David; Too Late To Talk To Billy; Frost In May | Clive Thomas |
| 1983 | Boys from the Blackstuff | Dick Bentley |
| 1983 | Nicholas Nickleby | Tony Imi |
| 1983 | The Barchester Chronicles/Nancy Astor | Howard King |
| 1984 | Hot Shoe Show | Bill Millar |
| 1984 | The Comedy of Errors; The Gathering Seed; The Last Day; Events in a Museum; Dombey and Son | Dave Sydenham |
| 1984 | Reith; My Cousin Rachel; Good Behaviour; The Tale of Beatrix Potter | Clive Thomas |
| 1984 | King Lear | Chris White |
| 1985 | The Box of Delights | John Mason |
| 1985 | Tenko | Peter Catlett |
| 1985 | The Hot Shoe Show | Dickie Higham, Bill Millar |
| 1985 | Oxbridge Blues | Dave Sydenham |
| 1986 | L'Enfance Du Christ | Luigi Bottone, Andy Andrews |
| 1986 | Oliver Twist | Bob Chaplin |
| 1986 | Cyrano de Bergerac | John Treays |
| 1986 | The Mysteries: The Nativity | John Treays |
| 1987 | The Life and Loves of a She-Devil | John King |
| 1987 | Fire and Ice | John Fyfe, Colin Innes-Hopkins |
| 1987 | All Passion Spent | Howard King, Colin Widgery |
| 1987 | First Among Equals | Peter Nolan |
| 1987 | Cosi Fan Tutte | John Summers |
| 1987 | Bluebell | Clive Thomas, Peter Greenyer |
| 1988 | The Charmer | Trevor Saunders |
| 1988 | Vanity Fair | David Cannings Bushell |
| 1988 | Tutti Frutti | James Maiden |
| 1988 | The Dorothy L Sayers Mysteries | Clive Thomas |
| 1989 | The Chronicles of Narnia | John Mason |
| 1989 | The Kirov Ballet Live in Britain | Clive Potter |
| 1989 | A Cream Cracker under the Settee | Clive Thomas |
| 1989 | La Traviata | Brian Turner |

=== 1990s ===
Best Film Cameramen

| Year | Recipient(s) | Title | Broadcaster |
|---|---|---|---|
| 1990 | Clive Tickner | Traffik | Channel 4 |
| 1990 | Michael Davis | Inspector Morse | ITV |
| 1990 | Nigel Meakin | Around the World in 80 Days (for "Episodes 1-4") | BBC One |
| 1990 | Nigel Walters | Around the World in 80 Days (for "Episodes 5-7") | BBC One |
| 1991 | Camera Team | The Trials of Life | BBC One |
| 1991 | Paul Wheeler | Inspector Morse | ITV |
| 1991 | Ian Punter | House of Cards | BBC One |
| 1991 | Ian Punter | Oranges Are Not the Only Fruit | BBC Two |

Best Video Lighting

| Year | Title | Recipient(s) | Broadcaster |
|---|---|---|---|
| 1990 | The Ginger Tree | Clive Thomas | BBC One |
| 1990 | The Chronicles of Narnia | John Mason | BBC |
| 1990 | Casualty | Chris Watts | BBC One |
| 1990 | Bomber Harris | Clive Thomas | BBC One |
| 1991 | Boon | Derek Constable, Keith Reed | ITV |
| 1991 | Drop the Dead Donkey | Keith Reed | Channel 4 |
| 1991 | Una Stravaganza Dei Medici | Luigi Bottone | Channel 4 |
| 1991 | The Chronicles of Narnia | John Mason | BBC |
| 1992 | Not awarded | | |
| 1993 | Tales from Hollywood | Duncan Brown | BBC Two |
| 1993 | Casualty | Nick Hollingbury | BBC One |
| 1993 | The House of Eliott | Chris Townsend | BBC One |
| 1993 | Gladiators | Brian Pearce | ITV |
| 1994 | Porgy and Bess | Chris Townsend | PBS |
| 1994 | Gladiators | Brian Pearce | ITV |
| 1994 | Casualty (for "Episodes 1, 5, 12 & 15") | Cedric Rich | BBC One |
| 1994 | Hedda Gabler | Clive Thomas | BBC Two |

Best Film or Video Photography - Fiction/Entertainment

| Year | Title | Recipient(s) | Broadcaster |
|---|---|---|---|
| 1992 | Prime Suspect | Ken Morgan | ITV |
| 1992 | G.B.H. | Peter Jessop | Channel 4 |
| 1992 | Clarissa | John McGlashan | BBC |
| 1992 | Inspector Morse (for "Programmes 1-4") | Paul Wheeler | ITV |
| 1993 | The Borrowers | Clive Tickner | BBC Two |
| 1993 | The Big Battalions | Chris O'Dell | Channel 4 |
| 1993 | Memento Mori | Remi Adefarasin | BBC Two |
| 1993 | Natural Lies | John McGlashan | BBC |
| 1994 | Cracker | Ivan Strasburg | ITV |
| 1994 | The Buddha of Suburbia | John McGlashan | BBC Two |
| 1994 | The Borrowers | Clive Tickner | BBC Two |
| 1994 | Scarlet and Black | John McGlashan | BBC One |

Best Photography & Lighting: Fiction

| Year | Title | Recipient(s) | Broadcaster |
|---|---|---|---|
| 1995 | Family | Daf Hobson | BBC One |
| 1995 | Finney | Kevin Rowley | ITV |
| 1995 | Middlemarch | Brian Tufano | BBC Two |
| 1995 | The Rector’s Wife | Witold Stok | Channel 4 |
| 1996 | Persuasion | John Daly | BBC Two |
| 1996 | The Politician's Wife | Tom McDougal | Channel 4 |
| 1996 | Prime Suspect | David Odd | ITV |
| 1996 | McCallum | Brian Morgan | ITV |
| 1997 | The Final Passage | Nic Knowland | Channel 4 |
| 1997 | The Tenant of Wildfell Hall | Daf Hobson | BBC One |
| 1997 | Truth or Dare | Richard Greatrex | BBC One |
| 1997 | Our Friends in the North | John Daly, John Kenway, Simon Kossoff | BBC Two |
| 1998 | The Woman in White | Richard Greatrex | BBC One |
| 1998 | Holding On | Peter Middleton, Alan Stewart | BBC Two |
| 1998 | The Lakes | Daf Hobson | BBC One |
| 1998 | Touching Evil | David Odd | ITV |
| 1999 | Far from the Madding Crowd | John Daly | BBC Two |
| 1999 | Vanity Fair | Oliver Curtis | BBC One |
| 1999 | Cold Feet | Peter Middleton | ITV |
| 1999 | Our Mutual Friend | David Odd | BBC Two |

=== 2000s ===
| Year | Title | Recipient(s) | Broadcaster |
|---|---|---|---|
| 2000 | Wives and Daughters | Fred Tammes | BBC One |
| 2000 | Great Expectations | David Odd | BBC Two |
| 2000 | David Copperfield | Andy Collins | BBC One |
| 2000 | Warriors | Richard Greatrex | BBC One |
| 2001 | Longitude | Peter Hannan | Channel 4 |
| 2001 | Clocking Off | Peter Greenhalgh | BBC One |
| 2001 | Lorna Doone | Chris Seager | BBC One |
| 2001 | Anna Karenina | Ryszard Lenczewski | Channel 4 |
| 2002 | Othello | Daf Hobson | ITV |
| 2002 | Clocking Off | Peter Greenhalgh | BBC One |
| 2002 | The Way We Live Now | Chris Seager | BBC One |
| 2002 | Perfect Strangers | Cinders Forshaw | BBC Two |
| 2003 | Bloody Sunday | Ivan Strasburg | ITV |
| 2003 | Shackleton | Henry Braham | Channel 4 |
| 2003 | White Teeth | David Odd | Channel 4 |
| 2003 | Daniel Deronda | Fred Tammes | BBC One |
| 2004 | Charles II: The Power and the Passion | Ryszard Lenczewski | BBC One |
| 2004 | Cambridge Spies | David Higgs | BBC Two |
| 2004 | State of Play | Chris Seager | BBC One |
| 2004 | The Lost Prince | Barry Ackroyd | BBC One |
| 2005 | Sex Traffic | Chris Seager | Channel 4 |
| 2005 | The Long Firm | Sean Bobbit | BBC Two |
| 2005 | Spooks | Simon Chaudoir | BBC One |
| 2005 | Dirty Filthy Love | David Odd | ITV |
| 2006 | The Girl in the Café | Chris Seager | BBC One |
| 2006 | To the Ends of the Earth | Ulf Brantas | BBC Two |
| 2006 | Bleak House | Kieran McGuigan | BBC One |
| 2006 | Twenty Thousand Streets Under the Sky | John Daly | BBC Four |
| 2007 | Shoot the Messenger | David Katznelson | BBC Two |
| 2007 | Longford | Danny Cohen | Channel 4 |
| 2007 | Tsunami: The Aftermath | John De Borman | BBC One |
| 2007 | Terry Pratchett's Hogfather | Gavin Finney | Sky1 |
| 2008 | Boy A | Rob Hardy | Channel 4 |
| 2008 | Spooks | Damian Bromley | BBC One |
| 2008 | Joe's Palace | Danny Cohen | BBC One |
| 2008 | Skins | Nick Dance | E4 |
| 2009 | Wallander | Anthony Dod Mantle | BBC One |
| 2009 | The Devil's Whore | Julian Court | Channel 4 |
| 2009 | House of Saddam | Florian Hoffmeister | BBC Two |
| 2009 | White Girl | Wojciech Szepel | BBC Two |

=== 2010s ===
| Year | Title | Recipient(s) | Broadcaster |
|---|---|---|---|
| 2010 | Red Riding 1983 | David Higgs | Channel 4 |
| 2010 | Desperate Romantics | Alan Almond | BBC Two |
| 2010 | Hamlet | Chris Seager | BBC Two |
| 2010 | Small Island | Tony Miller | BBC One |
| 2010 | Garrow's Law | Lukas Strebel | BBC One |
| 2010 | Wallander | Lukas Strebel | BBC One |
| 2011 | South Riding | Alan Almond | BBC One |
| 2011 | Terry Pratchett's Going Postal | Gavin Finney | Sky1 |
| 2011 | Downton Abbey | David Katznelson | ITV |
| 2011 | Five Daughters | Chris Seager | BBC One |
| 2011 | Any Human Heart | Wojciech Szepel | Channel 4 |
| 2012 | Great Expectations | Florian Hoffmeister | BBC One |
| 2012 | The Crimson Petal and the White | Lol Crawley | BBC Two |
| 2012 | The Hour | Chris Seager | BBC Two |
| 2012 | Top Boy | Tat Radcliffe | Channel 4 |
| 2013 | The Fear | Gavin Finney | Channel 4 |
| 2013 | Ripper Street | Julian Court | BBC One |
| 2013 | Blackout | Christopher Ross | BBC One |
| 2013 | Hunted | Balazs Bolygo | BBC One |
| 2014 | Peaky Blinders | George Steel | BBC Two |
| 2014 | Utopia | Ole Birkeland | Channel 4 |
| 2014 | Dancing on the Edge | Ashley Rowe | BBC Two |
| 2014 | Luther | John Conroy | BBC One |
| 2015 | The Lost Honour of Christopher Jefferies | Mike Eley | ITV |
| 2015 | Da Vinci's Demons | Owen McPolin | FOX |
| 2015 | The Honourable Woman | Zac Nicholson, George Steel | BBC Two |
| 2015 | Peaky Blinders | Simon Dennis | BBC Two |
| 2016 | London Spy | Laurie Rose | BBC Two |
| 2016 | Wolf Hall | Gavin Finney | BBC Two |
| 2016 | The Frankenstein Chronicles | Ian Moss | ITV Encore |
| 2016 | Fortitude | John Conroy | Sky Atlantic |
| 2017 | Rillington Place | James Friend | BBC One |
| 2017 | The Crown (for "Smoke and Mirrors") | Adriano Goldman | Netflix |
| 2017 | Nosedive (Black Mirror) | Seamus McGarvey | Netflix |
| 2017 | National Treasure | Ole Birkeland | Channel 4 |
| 2018 | The Crown (for "Beryl") | Adriano Goldman | Netflix |
| 2018 | Against the Law | Johann Perry | BBC Two |
| 2018 | Taboo | Mark Patten | BBC One |
| 2018 | USS Callister (Black Mirror) | Stephan Pehrsson | Netflix |
| 2019 | The Little Drummer Girl | Woo-Hyung Kim | BBC One |
| 2019 | Collateral | Balazs Bolygo | BBC Two |
| 2019 | Patrick Melrose | James Friend | Sky Atlantic |
| 2019 | Killing Eve (for "I Don't Want to Be Free") | Julian Court | BBC One |

=== 2020s ===
| Year | Title | Recipient(s) | Broadcaster |
|---|---|---|---|
| 2020 | Chernobyl | Jakob Ihre | Sky Atlantic |
| 2020 | His Dark Materials (for "The Spies") | Suzie Lavelle | BBC One |
| 2020 | The Crown | Adriano Goldman | Netflix |
| 2020 | Top Boy | Joe Anderson | Netflix |
| 2021 | Small Axe | Shabier Kirchner | BBC One |
| 2021 | Little Birds | Ed Rutherford | Sky Atlantic |
| 2021 | Devs | Rob Hardy | BBC Two |
| 2021 | Normal People | Suzie Lavelle | BBC Three |
| 2022 | Landscapers | Erik Wilson | Sky Atlantic |
| 2022 | Sex Education | Oli Russell | Netflix |
| 2022 | Your Honor | James Friend | Sky Atlantic |
| 2022 | Time | Mark Wolf | BBC One |
| 2023 | Jungle | Chas Appeti | Prime Video |
| 2023 | Pistol | Anthony Dod Mantle | Disney+ |
| 2023 | The Tourist | Ben Wheeler | HBO Max / BBC One |
| 2023 | I Am Ruth | Rachel Clark | Channel 4 |
| 2024 | Black Mirror: "Demon 79" | Stephan Pehrsson | Netflix |
| 2024 | The Long Shadow | Ed Rutherford | ITV |
| 2024 | The Sixth Commandment | Rik Zang | BBC One |
| 2024 | The Last of Us | Eben Bolter | HBO / Sky Atlantic |
| 2025 | Shōgun | Christopher Ross | Disney+ |
| 2025 | Eric | Benedict Spence | Netflix |
| 2025 | Sweetpea | Nick Morris | Sky Atlantic |
| 2025 | Say Nothing: "I Lay Waiting" | Stephen Murphy | Disney+ |
| 2026 | Trespasses | Ryan Kernaghan | Channel 4 |
| 2026 | Adolescence | Matthew Lewis | Netflix |
| 2026 | The Last of Us | Catherine Goldschmidt | Sky Atlantic |
| 2026 | Severance | Suzie Lavelle | Apple TV |

== See also ==
- Primetime Emmy Award for Outstanding Cinematography for a Limited Series or Movie
- Primetime Emmy Award for Outstanding Cinematography for a Single-Camera Series (Half-Hour)
- Primetime Emmy Award for Outstanding Cinematography for a Single-Camera Series (One Hour)
- British Society of Cinematographers Award for Best Cinematography in a Television Drama
