= British Academy Television Craft Award for Best Sound: Fiction =

Award presented annually by the British Academy of Film and Television Arts

British Academy Television Craft Award
- Country: United Kingdom
- Presented by: British Academy of Film and Television Arts
- First award: 1992
- Currently held by: James Drake, Jules Wood, Rob Entwistle, Kiff McManus, Kyle Pickford & Adam Méndez for Adolescence (2026)
- Website: http://www.bafta.org/

The British Academy Television Craft Award for Best Sound: Fiction is one of the categories presented by the British Academy of Film and Television Arts (BAFTA) within the British Academy Television Craft Awards, the craft awards were established in 2000 with their own, separate ceremony as a way to spotlight technical achievements, without being overshadowed by the main production categories.

Before splitting into two categories for sound in 1992, Best Sound: Fiction (Best Sound: Fiction/Entertainment from 1992 to 2012) and Best Sound: Factual, two categories were presented to recognize sound in television programming:

- From 1978 to 1991 Best Sound Supervisor was presented.
- From 1978 to 1991 Best Film Sound was presented.

== Winners and nominees ==
=== 1970s ===
Best Sound Supervisor

Year	Title	Recipient(s)
1978	Macbeth	Ray Angell
1978	Professional Foul; The Ambassadors	Chick Anthony
1978	The Velvet Glove Series	Richard Chubb
1978	Hi Summer	Vic Finch
1978	Rock Follies of '77	Mike Pontin
1979	Don Giovanni; Falstaff	Cyril Vine
1979	The South Bank Show: MacMillan's Mayerling	Mike Fairman
1979	The Proms	Graham Haines
1979	Lillie	Bob Pell, Paul Faraday

Best Film Sound

Year	Title	Recipient(s)'
1978	Eustace and Hilda	John Murphy
1978	Whicker's World	Don Atkinson
1978	Jesus of Nazareth	Simon Kaye, Gerry Humphrys
1978	Dummy	Peter Rann
1978	Paco	Brian Showell
1978	Open University: Mass Communications and Society - ABC in Kansas City	Robin Swain
1978	The Sweeney	Hugh Strain
1979	Schubert	John Murphy
1979	Me! I'm Afraid of Virginia Woolf; The South Bank Show: Macmillan's Mayerling	Bill Cross
1979	Pennies from Heaven	Mervyn Broadway
1979	The South Bank Show: Anatomy of an Opera	Bob Edwards

=== 1980s ===
Best Sound Supervisor

Year	Title	Recipient(s)
1980	The St Matthew Passion	Graham Haines, Ian Parr
1980	Rebecca	Norman Bennett
1980	Telford's Change	Colin Dixon
1980	Testament of Youth	Brian Hiles
1981	Fidelio	Ron Payne
1981	Des O'Connor; Grace Kennedy; Lena Zavaroni; Oscar Peterson; Song for Europe	Hugh Barker
1981	Pride and Prejudice	John Delaney
1981	The Kings Singers; Lenny and Jerry; Des O'Connor; Mike Yarwood Xmas Special; Butterflies	Len Shorey
1982	The Hitchhiker's Guide to the Galaxy	Michael McCarthy
1982	Kinvig	Michael Ayres
1982	A Fine Romance; The South Bank Show: Lulu’s Last Act	Mike Fairman
1982	Pygmalion	Chris Warner
1983	The Barchester Chronicles; Frost in May	Chick Anthony
1983	Boys from the Blackstuff	Ramon Bailey, David Baumber
1983	Nicholas Nickleby	Andrew Boulton
1983	Frost In May; Tishoo; Another Flip for Dominick; Season of Alan Bennett Plays; La Ronde; The Merry Wives of Windsor	Richard Chubb
1984	Three of a Kind; The Two Ronnies; Grace Kennedy	Mike McCarthy
1984	Auf Wiedersehen, Pet	Henry Bird
1984	The Hot Shoe Show; Here Come the Classics	Adrian Bishop-Laggett
1984	Reith; The Beggar's Opera; The Case of the Frightened Lady; Floating Off; Waters of the Moon	Richard Chubb
1985	Sounds Magnificent	Ray Angel
1985	Stars Of The Roller State Disco	Chick Anthony
1985	The Hot Shoe Show	Adrian Bishop-Laggett
1985	The Old Man of Hoy	Barrie Hawes
1986	The Mysteries: The Nativity	Roy Drysdale, David Taylor
1986	Andrew Lloyd Webber's Requiem	Jeff Baker
1986	L'Enfance Du Christ	Richard Bradford
1986	The South Bank Show: Domenico Scarlatti	Mike Fairman
1986	The Tube	John Overton
1987	The Bolshoi in the Park	Vic Godrich
1987	Cosi Fan Tutte	Ray Angel, Brendan Shore
1987	Bluebell	John Delany, Chris Holcombe
1987	Fire and Ice	Mike Fairman
1987	The Royal Variety Performance	Barrie Hawes, Paul Cunliffe
1987	First Among Equals	Dion Stuart
1988	Tutti Frutti (for Episodes 3 & 4)	Brian Dewar
1988	Shostakovich: The Golden Age	Graham Haines
1988	The Dame Edna Experience (for "Episodes 1 - 3")	Graham Hix
1988	Casualty	Rod Lewis
1989	The Nelson Mandela Concert	Chris Holcombe, Mike Johnstone, Mike Robinson, Ken O'Neill
1989	The Kirov Ballet Live in London	Vic Godrich
1989	Omnibus: Live from The Proms	Graham Haines
1989	Supersense	Andrew Wilson, Neil Hipkiss

Best Film Sound

Year	Title	Recipient(s)
1980	Speed King	Colin March
1980	The Secret Hospital	Don Atkinson
1980	Life on Earth	Lyndon Bird
1980	Tinker Tailor Soldier Spy	Malcolm Webberley
1981	A Sense of Place: The Fens	Tony Anscombe
1981	Oppenheimer; Caught On A Train; Silence Of The Sea; The World About Us: Roots	Peter Edwards
1981	Only In America: Detectives; Cowboys; Going Home - Hollywood; Creggan; Murphy's Stroke	Freddie Slade
1981	Strangeways	Michael Turner
1982	Brideshead Revisited	Phil Smith, John Whitworth, Peter Elliott
1982	The Shogun Inheritance; Forty Minutes	Ron Edmonds
1982	Private Schulz	Graham Hare
1982	Winston Churchill: The Wilderness Years	Paul Le Mare
1983	Police	Malcolm Hirst, David Motta, Peter Copeland, David Old
1983	Harry's Game	Terry Cavagin, Alan Willis, Don Atkinson
1983	P'tang, Yang, Kipperbang	Derek Ball, Chris Greenham, Hugh Strain
1983	Boys from the Blackstuff	Alex Christison, David Baumer
1983	Smiley's People	Malcolm Webberley, Ken Hains, John Strickland, Michael Parker
1984	An Englishman Abroad	Richard Manton, Ron Edmonds, Philip Kloss
1984	Wildlife on One (for "Nightlife")	Ray Goodwin, Peter Copeland, Alec Brown
1984	Reilly, Ace of Spies	Sandy MacRae, Peter Lennard, Mike Crowley, Ken Scrivener
1984	Widows	Derek Rye, John Blunt, Mike Murr
1985	The Living Planet	Lyndon Bird, David Old, Keith Rodgerson
1985	The Jewel in the Crown	Martin Kay, Chris Ackland, Richard Dunford, John Whitworth
1985	The South Bank Show: Vaughan Williams	Reg Mills, Sandy MacRae, Andy Nelson
1985	Threads	Graham Ross, John Hale, Donna Bickerstaff
1986	Edge of Darkness	Dickie Bird, Rob James, Christopher Swanton, Tony Quinn
1986	Kingdom of the Ice Bear	Peter Copeland, Ian Butcher
1986	Tina Turner: Private Dancer Tour 1985	John Hudson
1986	Bleak House	Malcolm Webberley, Ken Hains, Peter Rhodes, Helen Walker, Julian Wilkinson
1987	The Insurance Man	Mark Day, John Pritchard, Ken Hains
1987	British Cinema: Personal View	Tom Buchanan, Dennis Whitlock, Andy Nelson, Tony Chapman
1987	The Singing Detective	Clive Derbyshire, Rob James, Sue Metcalfe, Colin Ritchie, Mark Day
1987	The Monocled Mutineer	Rodger Long, Ken Hains, Colin Ritchie, Tony Quinn
1987	London's Burning	Reg Mills, David Holloway
1987	Lost Empires	Phil Smith, John Whitworth, Norman Cole
1988	The Duty Men	Dave Jewitt, Patrick Quirke, Michael Horwood, David Old, Micw Studd, John Bridgett
1988	Tutti Frutti	Peter Brill, Bronek Korda, Ian Frame, Andrew McClelland
1988	Fortunes of War	Terry Elms, Ken Hains, Judith Robson, Kim Houldin
1988	A Perfect Spy	Malcolm Webberley, Ken Hains, Tony Quinn, Graham Lawrence, John Hyde
1989	A Very British Coup	Christian Wangler, David Old, Peter Elliott
1989	Across The Lake	Lyndon Bird, Ken Hains, Judith Robson
1989	Tumbledown	Graham Ross, Ken Hains, Christopher Swanton
1989	Supersense	Mary Whitby James, Peter Hicks

=== 1990s ===
Best Sound Supervisor

Year	Title	Recipient(s)	Broadcaster
1990	Love for Three Oranges	Graham Haines	BBC
1990	Bomber Harris	Barry Bonner	BBC One
1990	The Marriage of Figaro	Ron Ferris	BBC
1990	Live from The Proms: Mahler's Symphony No.7	Graham Haines	BBC
1991	Boris Godunov (Live from Leningrad)	Graham Haines	BBC
1991	Challenge Anneka	Dave Chapman	BBC One
1991	Omnibus at The Proms	Paul Cunliffe	BBC One
1991	Mahler's 8th Symphony Live	Robert Edwards	BBC

Best Film Sound

Year	Title	Recipient(s)	Broadcaster
1990	Traffik	David Hildyard, Ken Weston, David Old	Channel 4
1990	Around the World in 80 Days	Ron Brown, John Hale, Andrew Metcalfe	BBC One
1990	Mother Love	Barry Tharby, Keith Marriner, Graham Lawrence	BBC One
1990	The Woman in Black	Tony Dawe, John Downer, Richard King	ITV
1991	Oranges Are Not the Only Fruit	Aad Wirtz, Kathy Rodwell, Malcolm Webberley	BBC Two
1991	Inspector Morse	Tony Dawe, David Old, Team	ITV
1991	Agatha Christie’s Poirot	Ken Weston, Rupert Scrivener, Team	ITV
1991	House of Cards	Barrie Tharby, Jonathan Rowdon, Mike Narduzzo	BBC One

Best Sound: Fiction

Year	Title	Recipient(s)	Broadcaster
1992	Inspector Morse	Tony Dawe, Brian Saunders, Nigel Galt, Paul Conway	ITV
1992	Drop the Dead Donkey	Keith Mayes	Channel 4
1992	Prime Suspect	Ray French, Brian Saunders, John Rutherford, Paul Griffiths-Davies	ITV
1992	The Bill	Alan Lester, Paul Gartrell	ITV
1993	Underbelly	Derek Norman, Jonathan Rowdon, Michael Narduzzo	BBC Two
1993	Prime Suspect 2	Nick Steer, John Rutherford, John Thomas, John Senior, Jaquie Ophir, John Whitworth	ITV
1993	Memento Mori	John Pritchard, Julie Buckland, Bronwen Jenkins, Aad Wirtz	BBC Two
1993	Bye Bye Baby	Ken Weston, Colin Chapman, Peter Lennard	Channel 4
1994	The Snapper	Kieran Horgan, Peter Joly, Dan Gane, Peter Maxwell, Mick Boggis	BBC
1994	Lipstick on Your Collar	John Midgley, Robin O’Donoghue, Andrew Glen	Channel 4
1994	Casualty		BBC One
1994	Between the Lines	Bruce Wills, Craig Irving, Peter Gates	BBC One
1995	Family	Kieran Horgan Rupert Miles, Paul Conway, David Old	BBC One
1995	Middlemarch	Dick Boulter, Ed Bazalgette, Catherine Hodgson, Paul Hamblin	BBC Two
1995	La Traviata	Graham Haines	BBC
1995	Cracker	Phil Smith, John Senior, John Rutherford, John Whitworth, Andy Wyatt	ITV
1996	Love Bites: Loved Up	John Taylor, Craig Irving, Tim Hudnott, Pete Collins, Chris Graver	BBC
1996	Four Goes to Glyndebourne: Ermione	John Middleton, Andy Rose	Channel 4
1996	The Choir	Derek Norman, Chris Graver, Keith Marriner	BBC One
1996	Prime Suspect	Nick Steer, John Rutherford, John Senior, John Whitworth	ITV
1997	Hillsborough	Phil Smith and Team	ITV
1997	The Crow Road	Colin Nicolson, Mark August, Colin Martin	BBC Scotland
1997	Kiss and Tell		ITV
1997	Our Friends in the North		BBC Two
1998	The Lakes	Richard Manton, Paul Hamblin, Graham Headicar, Andy Kennedy	BBC One
1998	Touching Evil	Paul Davies, Tim Alban, Glenn Calder, Richard Flynn	ITV
1998	Tom Jones	Dennis Cartwright, Paul Hamblin, Catherine Hodgson, Graham Headicar	BBC One
1998	Jonathan Creek	Terry Elms, Craig Irving, Laurie Taylor, Lee Chrichlow, Ben Norrington	BBC One
1999	Our Mutual Friend	Paul Hamblin, Catherine Hodgson, Graham Headicar, Richard Manton	BBC Two
1999	The Eurovision Song Contest	Barry Hawes, Tim Davies	BBC One
1999	Hornblower: The Even Chance	Christian Wangler, Colin Martin, Michael Crouch	ITV
1999	A Rather English Marriage	Jim Greenhorn, Colin Martin, Richard Skelton	BBC Two

=== 2000s ===
Year	Title	Recipient(s)	Broadcaster
2000	Warriors	David Old, Graham Headicar, Maurice Hillier, Danny Longhurst	BBC One
2000	Great Expectations	Richard Manton, Peter Smith, Bernard O’Reilly, Terry Brown	BBC Two
2000	Queer as Folk		Channel 4
2000	Wives and Daughters	Paul Hamblin, Peter Brill, Ian Wilkinson, Danny Sheehan	BBC One
2001	Anna Karenina		Channel 4
2001	A Touch of Frost	John Fountaine, Adam Severs	ITV
2001	Clocking Off		BBC One
2001	Longitude		Channel 4
2002	Clocking Off		BBC One
2002	Othello	Maurice Hillier, Colin Martin, Laura Lovejoy, Peter Bond	ITV
2002	The Lost World		BBC One
2002	The Way We Live Now		BBC One
2003	Daniel Deronda		BBC One
2003	Bloody Sunday		ITV
2003	The Hound of the Baskervilles	Clive Copland, Paul Hamblin, Lee Crichlow, Becki Ponting	BBC One
2003	Later with Jools Holland	Mike Felton	BBC Two
2004	State of Play	Simon Okin, Stuart Hilliker, Jamie McPhee, Pat Boxshall	BBC One
2004	Cambridge Spies	Richard Manton, Bernard O’Reilly, André Schmidt, Hugh Johnson	BBC Two
2004	Prime Suspect	Simon Okin, Ben Baird, Nick Roberts	ITV
2004	Charles II: The Power and the Passion	John Taylor, Paul Hamblin, Catherine Hodgson, Lee Chrichlow	BBC One
2005	Sex Traffic	Simon Okin, Jane Tattersall, David McCallum, Lou Solakofski	Channel 4
2005	The Long Firm	Richard Manton, Catherine Hodgson, Graham Headicar, Paul Hamblin	BBC Two
2005	Dirty Filthy Love	Reg Mills, Nick Cox, Phil Barnes, Nigel Edwards	ITV
2005	Shameless		Channel 4
2006	Colditz		BBC One
2006	To the Ends of the Earth	Paul Hamblin, Rory Farnan, Craig Butters, Clive Derbyshire	BBC Two
2006	Bleak House		BBC One
2006	Spooks		BBC One
2007	Tsunami: The Aftermath		BBC One
2007	Later with Jools Holland	Mike Felton	BBC Two
2007	Strictly Come Dancing	Gary Clarke	BBC One
2007	Life on Mars		BBC One
2008	Cranford	Paul Hamblin, Graham Headicar, Andre Schmidt, Peter Brill	BBC One
2008	Spooks	Rudi Buckle, James Feltham, Darren Banks, Ben Norrington	BBC One
2008	Life on Mars	Dave Sansom, James Feltham, Darren Banks, Alex Sawyer	BBC One
2008	Doctor Who		BBC One
2009	Wallander	Bosse Persson, Lee Crichlow, Iain Eyre, Paul Hamblin	BBC One
2009	God on Trial	Brian Milliken, Nigel Heath, Darren Banks, Alex Sawyer	BBC Two
2009	Little Dorrit	Rudi Buckle, Colin Chapman, Ross Adams, Richard Street	BBC One
2009	Spooks	James Feltham, Darren Banks, Ben Norrington, Glenn Marullo	BBC One

=== 2010s ===
Year	Title	Recipient(s)	Broadcaster
2010	Wallander	Paul Hamblin, Andre Schmidt, Catherine Hodgson, Bosse Persson	BBC One
2010	Red Riding 1974	Paul Cotterell, Danny Hambrook, Kallis Shamaris	Channel 4
2010	Cranford	Paul Hamblin, Peter Brill, Iain Eyre, Lee Walpole	BBC One
2010	Spooks	Nigel Heath, Darren Banks, Laura Lovejoy, Rudi Buckle	BBC One
2011	Downton Abbey	Nigel Heath, Alex Sawyer, Adam Armitage, Mark Holding	ITV
2011	South Riding	Alistair Crocker, Paul Hamblin, Alex Ellerington, Jeff Richardson	BBC One
2011	The Promise	Graham Headicar, Stuart Hilliker, Matt Skelding, Simon Clark	Channel 4
2011	Any Human Heart		Channel 4
2011	Mad Dogs	Adrian Rhodes, Reg Mills, Ben Norrington	Sky1
2012	Sherlock: A Scandal in Belgravia	Howard Bargroff, Jeremy Child, John Mooney, Doug Sinclair	BBC One
2012	The Hour	Rudi Buckle, Jamie Caple, Marc Lawes, Nigel Squibbs	BBC Two
2012	Birdsong		BBC One
2012	Great Expectations	Richard Dyer, Paul Hamblin, Stefan Henrix, Matt Skelding	BBC One
2013	Richard II (The Hollow Crown)	Tim Fraser, Adrian Rhodes, Keith Marriner	BBC Two
2013	Wallander	Paul Hamblin, Matt Skelding, Jim Goddard, Martin Beresford	BBC One
2013	Accused (for "Mo & Sue's Story")	Graham Headicar, Emma Pegram, Stuart Hilliker, Grant Bridgeman	BBC One
2013	The Hour	John Mooney, Nigel Squibbs, Jamie Caple, Marc Lawes	BBC Two
2014	Dancing on the Edge	Adrian Bell, Lee Crichlow, Robert Farr, Ian Wilkinson	BBC Two
2014	The Escape Artist	Chris Ashworth, Graham Headicar, Stuart Hilliker, Duncan Price	BBC One
2014	Luther	Howard Bargroff, Russell Jeffery, Mike Grimes, Emma Pegram	BBC One
2014	Peaky Blinders	Stuart Hilliker, Brian Milliken, Matthew Skelding, Lee Walpole	BBC Two
2015	Sherlock	John Mooney, Douglas Sinclair, Howard Bargroff, Paul McFadden	BBC One
2015	Cilla	Grant Bridgeman, Richard Davey, Simon Gershon, Keith Marriner	ITV
2015	The Missing		BBC One
2015	That Day We Sang	Chris Ashworth, Emma Pegram, Stuart Hilliker, Alex Ellerington	BBC Two
2016	Wolf Hall		BBC Two
2016	The Enfield Haunting	Adrian Rhodes, Simon Farmer, Jamie Roden, Antony Bayman	Sky Living
2016	The Sound of Music Live!	Kevin Duff, Andy Deacon, Sally Hesketh, Ben Milton	ITV
2016	Fortitude	Rudi Buckle, Phil Barnes, Blair Jollands, Howard Bargroff	Sky Atlantic
2016	London Spy	Scott Jones, Robert Brazier, Joseph Stracey, Ian Voigt	BBC Two
2016	Doctor Foster	Stuart Hilliker, Jim Goddard, Billy Quinn, Tom Deane	BBC One
2017	The Night Manager	Aitor Berenguer, Howard Bargroff, Alex Sawyer, Adam Armitage	BBC One
2017	War & Peace	Chris Ashworth, Lee Walpole, Stuart Hilliker, Jeff Richardson	BBC One
2017	Sherlock: The Abominable Bride	John Mooney, Douglas Sinclair, Howard Bargroff, Jon Salmon-Joyce	BBC One
2017	The Missing		BBC One
2018	The Crown		Netflix
2018	Peaky Blinders (for "Episode 6")	Forbes Noonan, Ben Norrington, Jim Goddard, Grant Bridgeman	BBC Two
2018	Sherlock		BBC One
2018	Taboo		BBC One
2018	USS Callister (Black Mirror)	John Rodda, Tim Cavagin, Kenny Clark, Michael Maroussas	Netflix
2019	Killing Eve		BBC One
2019	Bodyguard	Simon Farmer, Dan Johnson, Marc Lawes	BBC One
2019	A Very English Scandal		BBC One
2019	The Little Drummer Girl		BBC One

=== 2020s ===
Year	Title	Recipient(s)	Broadcaster
2020	Chernobyl	Stefan Henrix, Joe Beal, Stuart Hilliker, Vincent Piponnier	Sky Atlantic
2020	His Dark Materials	Dillon Bennett, Jon Thomas, Gareth Bull, James Ridgeway	BBC One
2020	A Christmas Carol		BBC One
2020	The Crown		Netflix
2021	His Dark Materials (for "Æsahættr")	Jon Thomas, Gareth Bull, James Ridgway, Dillon Bennett, Eilam Hoffman	BBC One
2021	Normal People	Niall O'Sullivan, Steve Fanagan, Niall Brady	BBC Three
2021	Small Axe	Paul Cotterell, James Harrison, Ronald Bailey, Lewis Morison	BBC One
2021	The Crown		Netflix
2022	A Very British Scandal		BBC One
2022	Intergalactic	Howard Bargroff, Judi Lee-Headman, Harry Barnes, Oliver Brierley, Adam Armitage, Jamie Caple	Sky One
2022	The Witcher (for "Episode 1")	James Bain, Robert Farr, Matthew Collinge, Matt Davies, Alyn Sclosa, Rob Prynne	Netflix
2022	Line of Duty		BBC One
2023	House of the Dragon	Alastair Sirkett, Doug Cooper, Martin Seeley, Paula Fairfield, Tim Hands, Adele Fletcher	Sky Atlantic
2023	SAS: Rogue Heroes	Judi Lee Headman, Nigel Squibbs, Tony Gibson, Darren McQuade	BBC One
2023	The Crown		Netflix
2023	Slow Horses	Martin Jensen, Joe Beal, Duncan Price, Craig Butters, Sarah Elias, Andrew Sissons	Apple TV+
2024	Slow Horses		Apple TV+
2024	The Witcher	Matthew Collinge, James Bain, Robert Farr, Tom Melling, Matt Davies, Alyn Sclosa	Netflix
2024	Boiling Point	Jules Woods, James Drake, Oscar Bloomfield-Crowe, Paddy McGuirk	BBC One
2024	The Crown	Chris Ashworth, Lee Walpole, Stuart Hilliker, Martin Jensen, Saoirse Christopherson, Iain Eyre	Netflix
2025	Slow Horses	Andrew Sissons, Martin Jensen, Joe Beal, Alex Ellerington, Duncan Price, Abbie Shaw	Apple TV+
2025	House of the Dragon	Alastair Sirkett, Doug Cooper, Simon Bishop, Tim Hands, Adele Fletcher, Barnaby Smyth	Sky Atlantic
2025	True Detective: Night Country	Howard Bargroff, Stephen Griffiths, Tom Jenkins, Andy Shelley, Mark Timms, Michele Woods	Sky Atlantic
2025	Baby Reindeer	Matthew Skelding, Tom Jenkins, Milos Stojanovic, James Ridgway, Jack Whitelee	Netflix
2026	Adolescence	James Drake, Jules Wood, Rob Entwistle, Kiff McManus, Kyle Pickford, Adam Méndez	Netflix
2026	Andor	Danny Hambrook, David Acord, Margit Pfeiffer, James Spencer, Josh Gold, John Finklea	Disney+
2026	Lockerbie: A Search for Truth	Lee Walpole, Stuart Hilliker, Saoirse Christopherson, Andy Kennedy, Lee Crichlow, Chris Campion	Sky Atlantic
2026	Slow Horses	Andrew Sissons, Martin Jensen, Ben Tisdall, Joe Beal, Duncan Price, Conor Thompson	Apple TV

- Note: The series that don't have recipients on the tables had Sound team credited as recipients for the award or nomination.

== See also ==
- Primetime Emmy Award for Outstanding Sound Editing for a Comedy or Drama Series (One-Hour)
- Primetime Emmy Award for Outstanding Sound Mixing for a Comedy or Drama Series (One-Hour)
- Primetime Emmy Award for Outstanding Sound Editing for a Comedy or Drama Series (Half-Hour) and Animation
- Primetime Emmy Award for Outstanding Sound Mixing for a Comedy or Drama Series (Half-Hour) and Animation
- Primetime Emmy Award for Outstanding Sound Editing for a Limited Series, Movie, or Special
- Primetime Emmy Award for Outstanding Sound Mixing for a Limited Series or Movie
