= 2004 British Academy Television Craft Awards =

Technical achievements in television awards ceremony

5th British Academy Television Craft Awards
- Date: 16 May 2004
- Site: The Dorchester, Mayfair, UK
- Hosted by: Alistair McGowan

The British Academy Television Craft Awards of 2004 are presented by the British Academy of Film and Television Arts (BAFTA) and were held on 16 May 2004 at The Dorchester, Mayfair, the ceremony was hosted by Alistair McGowan.

== Winners and nominees ==
Winners will be listed first and highlighted in boldface.

Best New Director - Fiction	Best New Director - Factual
**Sarah Gavron – This Little Life**; Andrew Lincoln – Teachers; Gabriel Range – The Day Britain Stopped; Tim Supple – Twelfth Night	**Oli Barry – The Nine Lives Of Alice Martineau**; Will Anderson – Surviving Extremes: The Swamp; Paul Berczeller – Alt TV: This Is A True Story; Jamie Jay Johnson – Alt TV: Holidays Around My Bedroom
Best New Writer	Best Original Television Music
**Rosemary Kay – This Little Life**; Helen Blakeman – Pleasureland; Terry Cafolla – Holy Cross; Jack Lothian – Teachers	**The Young Visiters – Nicholas Hooper**; The Forsyte Saga – Geoffrey Burgon; State of Play – Nicholas Hooper; The Lost Prince – Adrian Johnston
Best Costume Design	Best Production Design
**Charles II: The Power and the Passion – Mike O'Neill**; The Mayor of Casterbridge – Lyn Avery; Little Britain – Annie Hardinge; The Canterbury Tales: The Wife of Bath – Sammy Sheldon	**The Lost Prince – John-Paul Kelly**; The Forsyte Saga – Stephen Fineren; Charles II: The Power and the Passion – Sarah Greenwood; Cambridge Spies – Mike Gunn
Best Photography and Lighting - Fiction	Best Photography - Factual
**Charles II: The Power and the Passion – Ryszard Lenczewski**; The Lost Prince – Barry Ackroyd; Cambridge Spies – David Higgs; State of Play – Chris Seager	**Ancient Egyptians: The Battle of Meggido – Peter Greenhalgh**; George Orwell: A Life in Pictures – Jeff Baynes; Colosseum – Peter Greenhalgh; Seven Wonders of the Industrial World (Episode: Hoover Dam) – Mike Spragg
Best Editing - Fiction/Entertainment	Best Editing - Factual
**State of Play – Mark Day**; The Lost Prince – Clare Douglas; Spooks – Paul Knight, Barney Pilling; Prime Suspect – St John O’Rorke	**Arena: The Many Lives of Richard Attenborough – Sean Mackenzie**; Ancient Egyptians: The Battle of Megiddo – Mark Gravil; Days That Shook the World (Episode: Hiroshima) – Chris King; George Orwell: A Life in Pictures – Steve Stevenson
Best Make-Up and Hair Design	Best Graphic Design
**Little Britain – Lisa Cavalli-Green**; Dead Ringers – Kate Benton, Diane Chenery-Wickens; Charles II: The Power and the Passion – Karen Hartley-Thomas; The Lost Prince – Liz Tagg	**Restoration – Tim Varlow**; Cambridge Spies – Christine Buttner; Natural World – David Freeman, Will Skinner; Film 2003 – Tim Varlow
Best Sound - Entertainment	Best Sound - Factual
**State of Play – Simon Okin, Stuart Hilliker, Jamie McPhee, Pat Boxshall**; Cambridge Spies – Richard Manton, Bernard O’Reilly, André Schmidt, Hugh Johnson; Prime Suspect – Simon Okin, Ben Baird, Nick Roberts; Charles II: The Power and the Passion – John Taylor, Paul Hamblin, Catherine Hodgson, Lee Chrichlow	**Operatunity – Trevor Hotz, Paul Parsons, Graham Haines**; Elephants – Spy In The Herd – Peter Davies, Paul Cowgill, Paul Cooper; Ancient Egyptians: The Battle of Megiddo – Paul Hamblin, Tim Owens, Max Bygrave; Living with Michael Jackson – Samantha Handy, Zubin Sarosh, Dion Stuart
Best Visual Effects
**Walking With Dinosaurs: Sea Monsters (Trilogy) – Max Tyrie, Tim Greenwood, Jez Gibson-Harris, Jamie Campbell**; Ancient Egyptians: The Battle of Megiddo – Grahame Andrew, Rob Harvey, Julian Parry, Abbie Tucker-Williams; George Orwell: A Life in Pictures – Aidan Farrell, Barney Jordan; Walking With Dinosaurs: Land Of The Giants (Special) – Max Tyrie, George Roper, Jez Gibson-Harris, Jamie Campbell

=== Special awards ===
- **Adrian Wood**

== See also ==
- 2004 British Academy Television Awards
