= Cambridge Spies =

2003 British television drama series

- Genre: Historical drama
- Written by: Peter Moffat
- Directed by: Tim Fywell
- Starring: Tom Hollander; Toby Stephens; Samuel West; Rupert Penry-Jones
- Composer: John Lunn
- Country of origin: United Kingdom
- Original language: English
- No. of episodes: 4

Production
- Executive producers: Laura Mackie; Gareth Neame; Sally Woodward Gentle
- Producer: Mark Shivas
- Running time: 60 minutes

Original release
- Network: BBC Two
- Release: 9 May – 30 May 2003

Cambridge Spies is a four-part British drama written by Peter Moffat and directed by Tim Fywell, that was first broadcast on BBC Two in May 2003 and is based on the true story of four Cambridge University students who are recruited in 1934 to spy for the Soviet Union.

== Plot ==
The series is set from 1934 to 1951 and follows the lives of the quartet of Cambridge Five Soviet spies, Guy Burgess, Kim Philby, Anthony Blunt and Donald Maclean, who whilst studying at the University of Cambridge are courted by Soviet agents and recruited into a world of covert intelligence and espionage. Fuelled by idealism, a passion for social justice, a talent for lying and a hatred for fascism, the four take personal risks to pass Britain's biggest secrets to Moscow. Across almost twenty years of spying and treachery, the four are bound by their beliefs, the secrets they know about one another, and the knowledge that they stand or fall together.

== Cast ==
- Tom Hollander as Guy Burgess, Soviet spy inside MI6 and later the Foreign Office.
- Toby Stephens as Kim Philby, Soviet spy inside MI6.
- Samuel West as Anthony Blunt, Soviet spy inside MI5; he would later go on to be Art Curator to the Royal Family.
- Rupert Penry-Jones as Donald Maclean, Soviet spy inside the Foreign Office.
- Lisa Dillon as Litzi Friedman, an Austrian Communist who was the first wife of Kim Philby.
- Patrick Kennedy as Julian Bell, an English poet and lover of Anthony Blunt. Bell studied at the University of Cambridge with the Cambridge spies and would later die in the Spanish Civil War.
- Stuart Laing as Jack Hewit, a dancer who becomes the lover of Guy Burgess and later Anthony Blunt.
- Julian Firth as Edward, Prince of Wales.
- Anthony Andrews as King George VI.
- Angus Wright as Guy Liddell, a British intelligence officer.
- Alastair Galbraith as John Cairncross, the fifth member of the Cambridge spies, Cairncross was recruited by the Soviets to spy for them inside the Foreign Office, Bletchley Park and finally MI6.
- John Light as James Jesus Angleton, head of Staff A of the CIA's Office of Special Operations, where he was responsible for the collection of foreign intelligence and liaison with the CIA's counterpart organizations.
- Ronald Pickup as Colonel Winter, a British intelligence officer.
- Anna-Louise Plowman as Melinda Maclean, wife of Donald Maclean.
- James Fox as Lord Halifax, British ambassador to the United States.
- Garrick Hagon as Klaus Fuchs, a German theoretical physicist and atomic spy who supplied information from the American, British and Canadian Manhattan Project to the Soviet Union during and shortly after World War II.
- Nancy Carroll as Frances Doble, a Canadian-born actress who had an affair with Kim Philby during the Spanish Civil War.
- Benedict Cumberbatch as Edward Hand, a journalist covering the Spanish Civil War.
- Imelda Staunton as Queen Elizabeth.
- Marcel Iureș as Arnold Deutsch a.k.a. Otto, a Soviet spy responsible for recruiting the Cambridge Five.
- John Guerrasio as General Walter Bedell Smith, the head of the CIA.
- Joe Searby as Walter Krivitsky, a Soviet intelligence officer who defects to America.

== Production ==
Cambridge Spies was commissioned by Jane Tranter, BBC Controller of Drama Commissioning and production was announced on Cambridge Spies in August 2002. The BBC announced that it wanted the audience to be able to sympathise with the spies, whom it would portray as "incredibly glamorous". A BBC spokeswoman said it would be a "fresh" take on the story, and that it was the first time the story of the group as a whole had ever been tackled by film-makers.

=== Filming ===
Filming for Cambridge Spies began in September 2002 at locations in England and Spain. Filming took place at the University of Cambridge, where four days into filming a truck loaded with prop bicycles was stolen from outside a Cambridge hotel and emptied of its contents.

Various locations in London were used, such as One Great George Street, St. James's Park, Regent's Park, Hyde Park, Ham House; and Highgate Cemetery.

Locations in Spain were used as well with scenes set in Vienna, Austria, being filmed in Barcelona and scenes depicting the 1937 bombing of Guernica were filmed in Madrid.

== Episodes ==
No.	Title	Directed by	Written by	British air date	UK viewers (million)
1	"Episode 1"	Tim Fywell	Peter Moffat	9 May 2003	2.80
Blunt, Burgess, Philby and Maclean meet at the University of Cambridge and bond through their common leaning towards communism, which they see as the only alternative to fascism. They agree to spy for the Soviets and once the university year ends, Philby is sent on assignment to Vienna, where he marries a committed Communist, Litzi Friedman. Once back in England, Philby's runner, Blunt, tells him that the marriage is not in the interests of the mission and Philby has to end it.
2	"Episode 2"	Tim Fywell	Peter Moffat	16 May 2003	N/A
Burgess, Blunt, Philby and Maclean, still ardent communists and working for the KGB, must follow instructions and cover their political leanings. They now have to convince the powers that be that they have outgrown their juvenile leanings towards socialism and become members of the British establishment to become moles on the inside. Burgess is hired by the BBC and offers his services to MI6, whilst Maclean joins the Foreign Office and Blunt gains the confidence of the British royal family. Philby is sent to Spain to report on the civil war, where he fails to carry out orders from his Soviet control, Otto, to assassinate General Francisco Franco. Philby flees Spain and survives, but his betrayal costs Otto his life. When Stalin signs a non-aggression pact with Nazi Germany, all four feel betrayed as their struggles against fascism have been turned upside down.
3	"Episode 3"	Tim Fywell	Peter Moffat	23 May 2003	N/A
With the German invasion of the Soviet Union, the spies find themselves working for the Allies. Maclean marries an American woman, Melinda, so that he can bring her into Britain with him after the outbreak of war. Philby is back in England, working high up in the British Secret Service, using his position to supply information to the Russians. Blunt gains the trust of the British royal family and wants to pull out of British intelligence and offers the KGB to be their man inside the royal palace.
4	"Episode 4"	Tim Fywell	Peter Moffat	30 May 2003	N/A
Posted to Washington during the Cold War, Maclean is using visits to his wife in New York City for access to the Atomic Energy Commission, passing information to his Soviet contact, K. Melinda wants him to stop and CIA man James Jesus Angleton is suspicious after the Soviets explode an atomic bomb. Kim Philby goes to America to head off Angleton. Burgess is also in Washington and is dangerously out of control. Maclean returns to London and does the bare minimum for Moscow. Angleton has traced an atomic leak to possible suspects including "Homer", Maclean's code name. Philby can't protect Maclean any longer, Moscow insists he's recalled along with Burgess. Blunt orders Burgess to accompany Maclean to Moscow but doesn't explain that neither will be coming back.

== Reception ==
=== Ratings ===
Viewing figures for the series averaged at 2 million per episode.

=== Critical reception ===
Mark Lawson from The Guardian said "Cambridge Spies is high-class drama, but historically it's best regarded as a cover story".

Appearing on Newsnight, Will Self, of the Evening Standard said "I think the historical inaccuracy is unforgivable. These are recent events. The real story is exciting and incredibly revealing of the nature of the British establishment at the time and on an enduring level. The historical liberties that have been taken, kick off from the start".

=== Awards and nominations ===
Year	Award	Category	Nominee	Result	Ref.
2004	British Academy Television Craft Awards	Best Graphic Design	Christine Buttner	Nominated	
2004	British Academy Television Craft Awards	Best Photography and Lighting (Fiction/Entertainment)	David Higgs	Nominated	
2004	British Academy Television Craft Awards	Best Production Design)	Mike Gunn	Nominated	
2004	British Academy Television Craft Awards	Best Sound (Fiction/Entertainment)	Richard Manton	Nominated	
2004	British Academy Television Craft Awards	Best Sound (Fiction/Entertainment)	Bernard O'Reilly	Nominated	
2004	British Academy Television Craft Awards	Best Sound (Fiction/Entertainment)	Andre Schmidt	Nominated	
2004	British Academy Television Craft Awards	Best Sound (Fiction/Entertainment)	Hugh Johnson	Nominated	
2004	2004 Festival International de Programmes Audiovisuels	Golden FIPA - TV Series and Serials: Music	John Lunn	Won	
2004	2004 Festival International de Programmes Audiovisuels	Golden FIPA - TV Series and Serials: Actor	Tom Hollander	Won	
2004	2004 Festival International de Programmes Audiovisuels	Silver FIPA - TV Series and Serials	Tim Fywell	Won	
2004	GLAAD Media Awards	Outstanding TV Movie or Limited Series	Cambridge Spies	Nominated	

== Home media ==
The complete series was released on DVD on 2 June 2003.
