= Gerry Scott =

English television production designer (1944–2007)

- Born: Geraldine Mary Boldy; 4 November 1944; Bradford, West Yorkshire, England
- Died: 25 April 2007 (aged 62); London, England
- Education: Bradford College; Sunderland College
- Occupation: Production designer
- Employer: BBC
- Spouses: Tony Scott (m. 1967; div. 1974) Archie Foulds (m. 2006)
- Awards: British Academy Television Craft Awards (2000, 2002)

Gerry Scott Foulds (born Geraldine Mary Boldy; 4 November 1944 – 25 April 2007) was an English production designer.

== Biography ==
Born Geraldine Mary Boldy in Bradford, West Yorkshire, she graduated with qualifications in art from Bradford College and Sunderland College in the late 1960s. She then joined the design department of the BBC, after initially being rejected "because she was a painter and couldn't draw plans"; she learned how to do plans over a six-month period before reapplying for the job.

At the BBC, Scott worked on such productions as Sykes, Porridge, Ripping Yarns and Blake's 7 from 1972 to 1980. Her work on the 1991 miniseries Clarissa saw her find her calling as a designer on historical dramas, and her subsequent work included Middlemarch (1994), Pride and Prejudice (1995), Wives and Daughters (1999), The Way We Live Now (2001) and He Knew He Was Right (2004).

In 2002, Scott was diagnosed with a brain tumour which affected her vision; she nonetheless continued working after radical surgery, on an adaptation of Anthony Trollope's He Knew He Was Right. She died from the brain tumour in 2007.

== Awards ==
Scott won two British Academy Television Craft Awards (BAFTAs) after being nominated several times: one in 2000 for Wives and Daughters, and the second in 2002 for The Way We Live Now.

== Personal life ==
Boldy was married to the film director and producer Tony Scott, whom she had met when they were both students at Sunderland College, from 1967 to 1974. She described her marriage to Scott as "traumatic, wild, and crazy, but the very best", and the two remained friends following their divorce.

She married Archie Foulds, her partner of over ten years, in June 2006. She had no children.
