= 2000 British Academy Television Awards =

UK television awards ceremony

- Date: 14 May 2000
- Site: Grosvenor House Hotel
- Hosted by: Des Lynam

Highlights
- Best Comedy Series: The League of Gentlemen
- Best Drama: The Cops
- Best Actor: Michael Gambon; Wives and Daughters
- Best Actress: Thora Hird; Lost for Words
- Best Comedy Performance: Caroline Aherne The Royle Family
- Most awards: The Royle Family (2)
- Most nominations: The Royle Family (4)

Television coverage
- Channel: ITV
- Ratings: 7.85 million

The 2000 British Academy Television Awards were held on Sunday 14 May 2000. The ceremony was hosted by sportscaster Des Lynam, aired on ITV and took place at the Grosvenor House Hotel in Park Lane, London.

== Winners and nominees ==
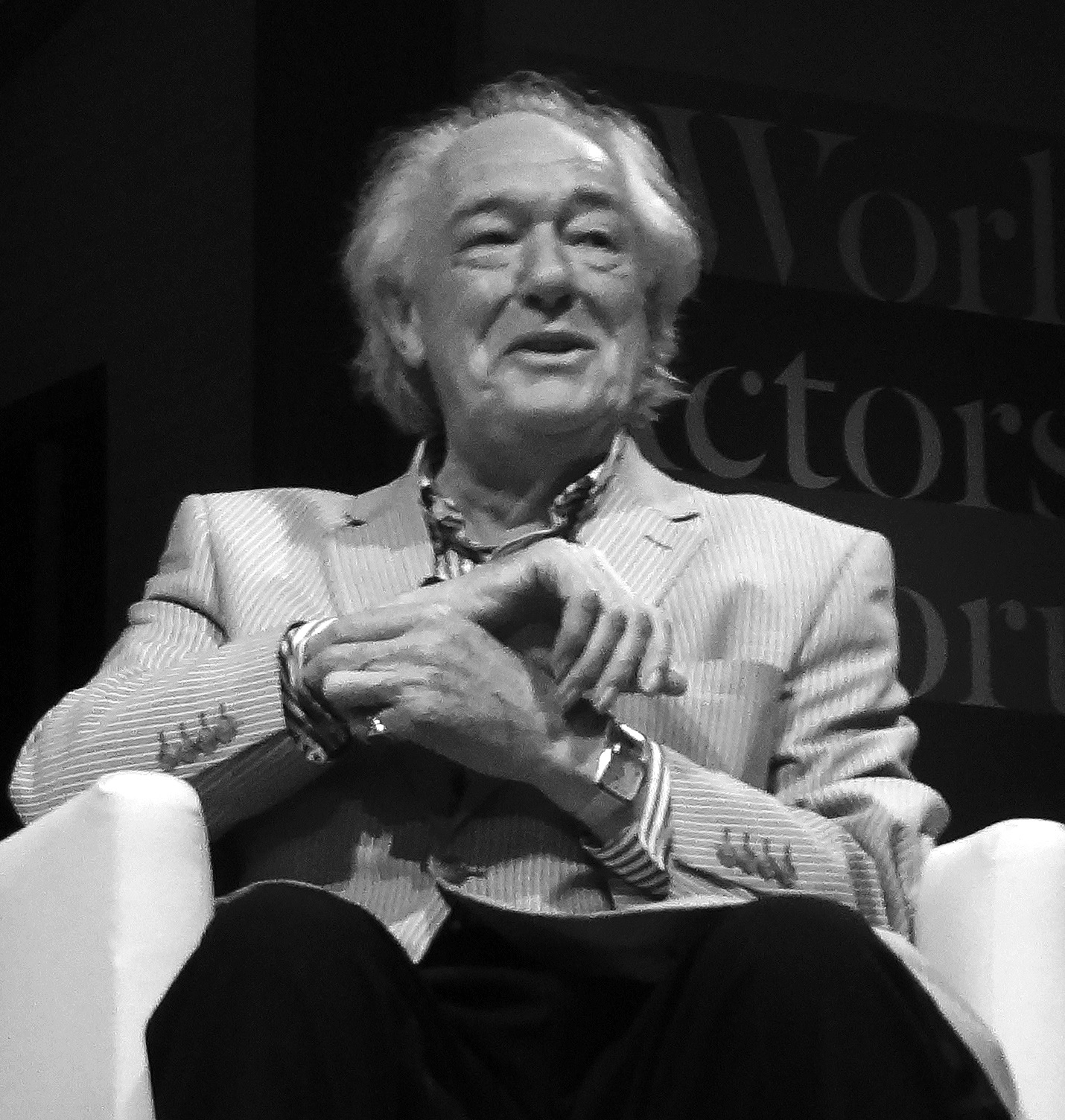
Michael Gambon, Best Actor winner

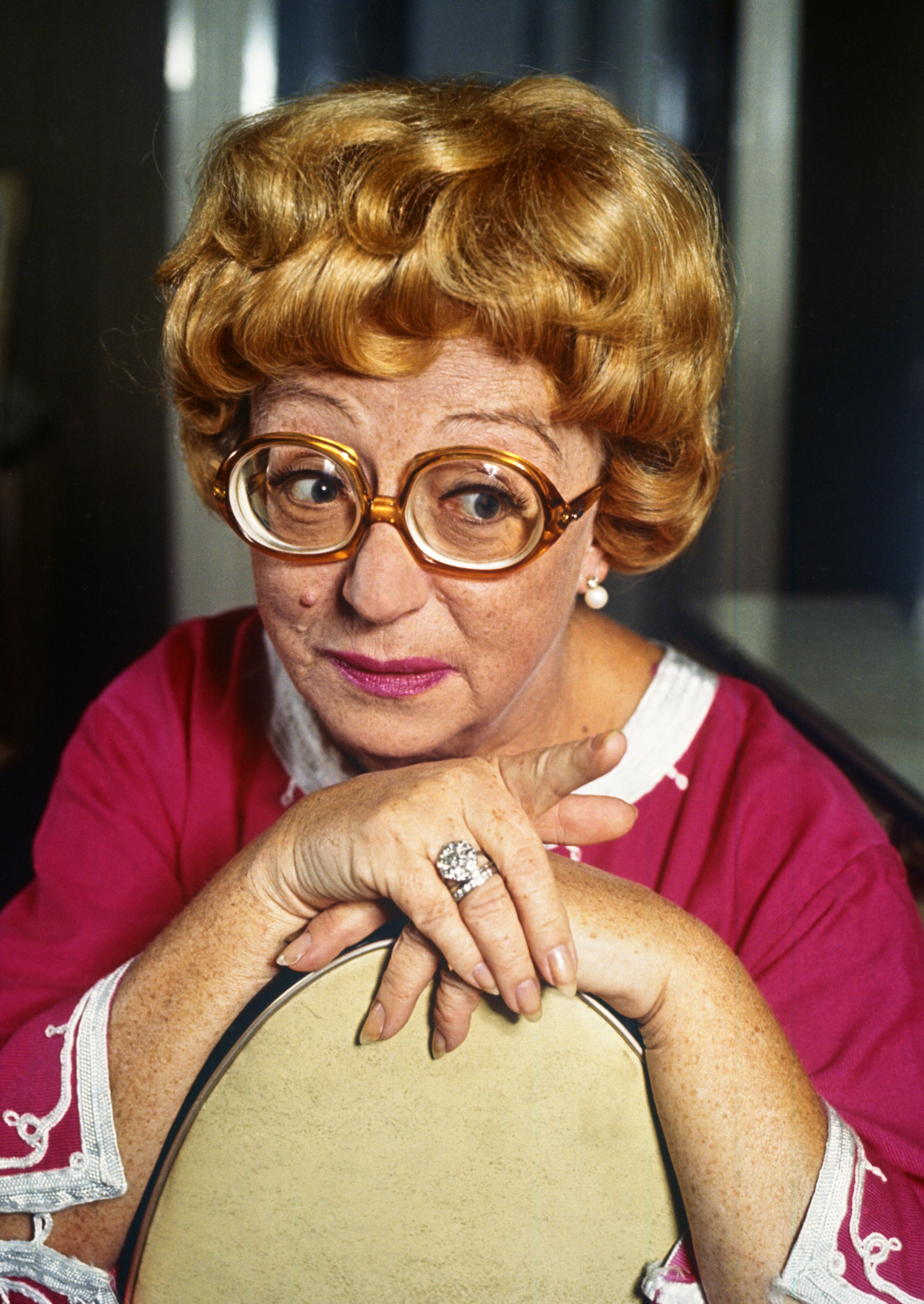
Thora Hird, Best Actress winner

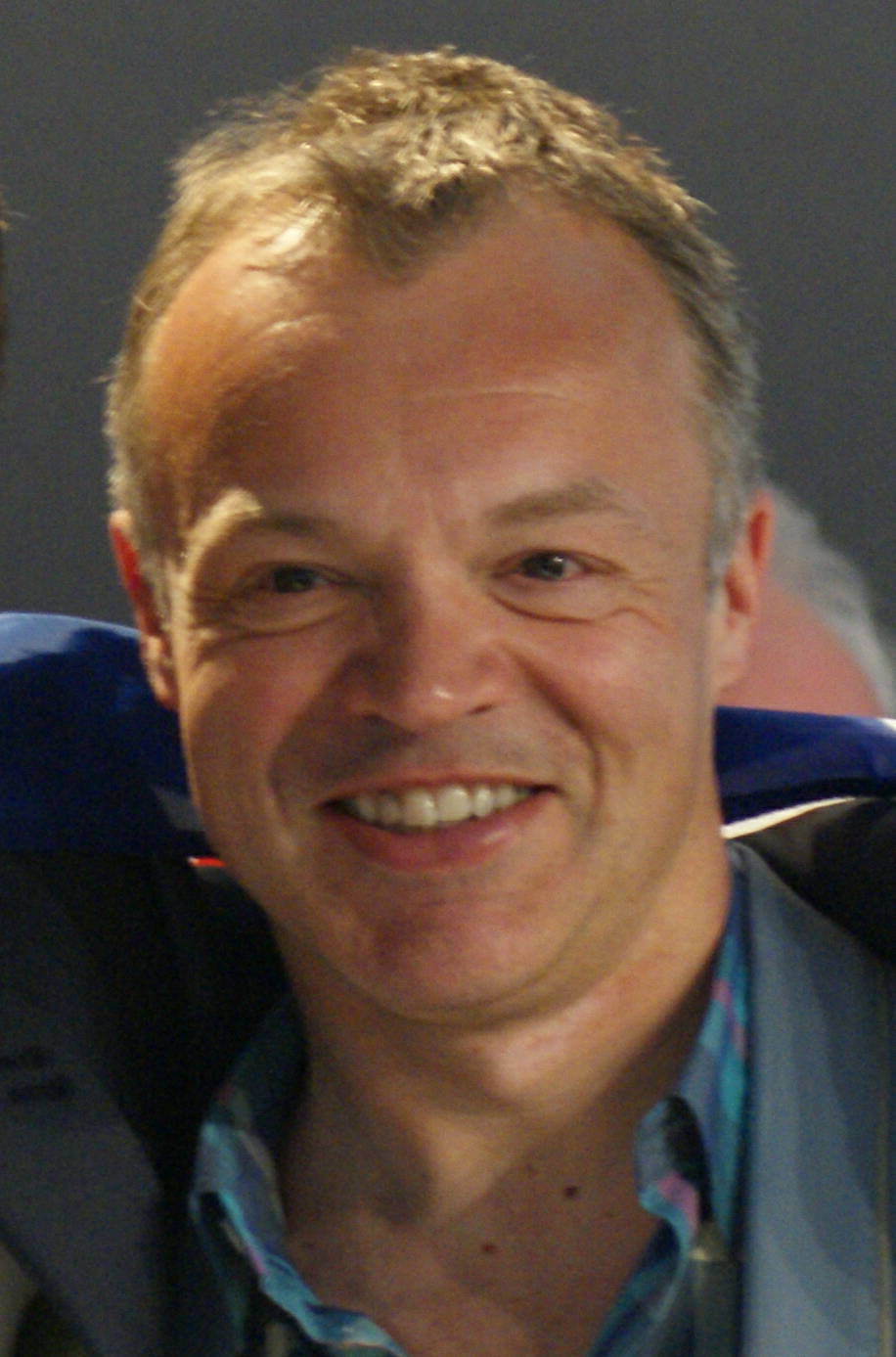
Graham Norton, Best Entertainment Performance winner

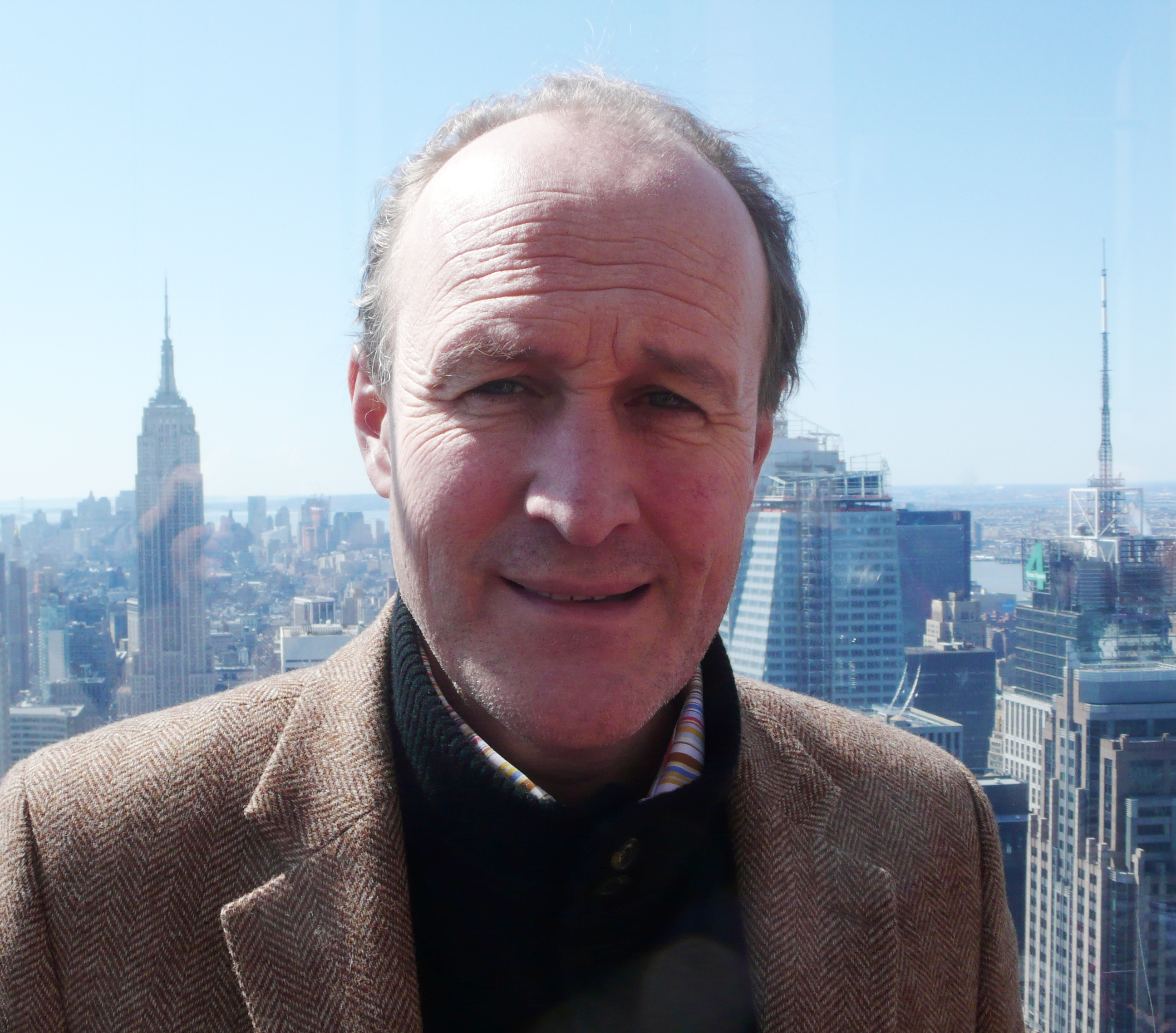
Peter Bazalgette, BAFTA Fellowship Award recipient

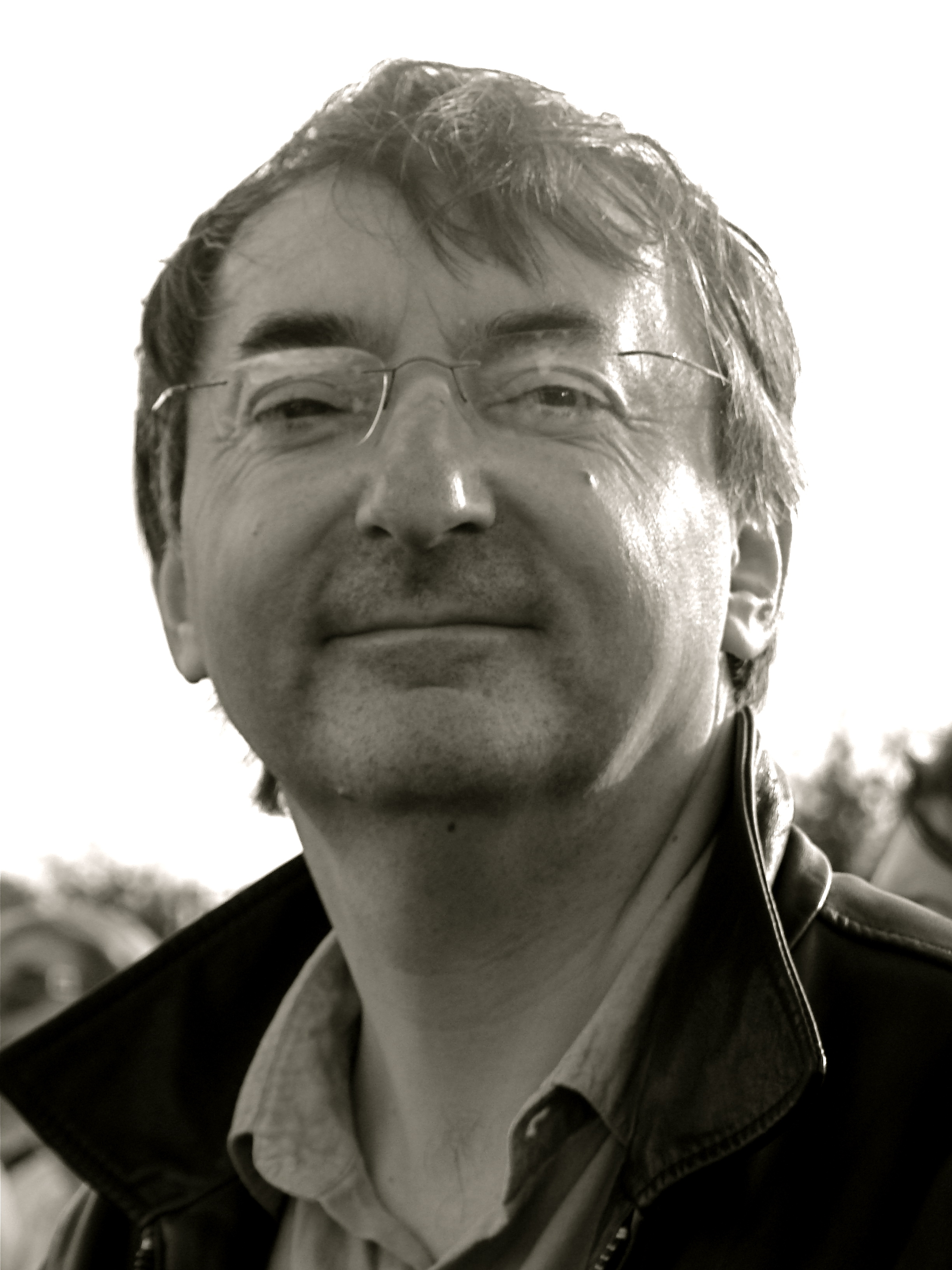
Peter Kosminsky, Alan Clarke Award recipient

Best Drama Series	Best Drama Serial
The Cops (BBC Two); Cold Feet (ITV); Playing the Field (BBC One); Psychos (Channel 4)	Warriors (BBC One); Births, Marriages and Deaths (BBC Two); Kid in the Corner (Channel 4); Wives and Daughters (BBC One)
Best Single Drama	Best Soap and Continuing Drama
The Murder of Stephen Lawrence (ITV); Dockers (Channel 4); Lost for Words (ITV); Sex 'n' Death (BBC Two)	EastEnders (BBC One); Brookside (Channel 4); Coronation Street (ITV); Emmerdale (ITV)
Best Actor	Best Actress
Michael Gambon – Wives and Daughters as Squire Hamley (BBC One); Aidan Gillen – Queer as Folk as Stuart Alan Jones (Channel 4); Pete Postlethwaite – Lost for Words as Deric Longden (ITV); Timothy Spall – Shooting the Past as Oswald Bates (BBC Two)	Thora Hird – Lost for Words as Annie Longden (ITV); Francesca Annis – Wives and Daughters as Hyacinth Gibson (BBC One); Lindsay Duncan – Shooting the Past as Marilyn Truman (BBC Two); Maggie Smith – David Copperfield as Betsey Trotwood (BBC One)
Best Comedy Performance	Best Comedy
Caroline Aherne – The Royle Family as Denise Best (BBC One); Dawn French – The Vicar of Dibley as Geraldine Granger (BBC One); Sue Johnston – The Royle Family as Barbara Royle (BBC One); Ricky Tomlinson – The Royle Family as Jim Royle (BBC One)	The League of Gentlemen (BBC Two); The Best of Ali G (Channel 4); People Like Us (BBC Two); Smack the Pony (Channel 4)
Best Scripted Comedy	Best Entertainment Performance
The Royle Family (BBC One); Dinnerladies (BBC One); Spaced (Channel 4); The Vicar of Dibley (BBC One)	Graham Norton – So Graham Norton (Channel 4); John Bird and John Fortune – Bremner, Bird and Fortune (Channel 4); Sacha Baron Cohen – The 11 O'Clock Show (Channel 4); Michael Parkinson – Parkinson (BBC One)
Entertainment Programme or Series	Best News and Current Affairs Journalism
Robbie the Reindeer: Hooves of Fire (BBC One); Have I Got News for You (BBC Two); Robot Wars (BBC Two); So Graham Norton (Channel 4)	Coverage of the Kosovo Conflict (BBC One); Coverage of the Kosovo Conflict (Sky News); The Paddington Crash (Channel 4); Tonight with Trevor McDonald — Interview with the Lawrence Suspects (ITV)
Best Factual Series or Strand	Huw Wheldon Award for Best Arts Programme or Series
The Mayfair Set (BBC Two); Manhunt - The Search for the Yorkshire Ripper (ITV); The Second World War in Colour (ITV); Shanghai Vice (Channel 4)	This is Modern Art (Channel 4); The ABBA Story (ITV); Hitchcock (Reputations) Alfred the Great / Alfred the Auteur (BBC Two); The Hip Hop Years (Channel 4)
Robert Flaherty Award for Single Documentary	Best Feature
True Stories – Divorce Iranian Style (Channel 4); Gulag (BBC Two); True Stories – Kosovo - The Valley (Channel 4); Malcolm and Barbara - A Love Story (ITV)	Blood on the Carpet (BBC Two); Giants with Nigel Marven (ITV); Grand Designs (Channel 4); The Naked Chef (BBC Two)
Best Sport	Innovation
Test Cricket (Channel 4); Interactive Live Football (Sky Sports); Formula One 1999 (ITV); The Open Golf Championship 1999 (BBC One/BBC Two)	Walking with Dinosaurs (BBC One); The 1900 House (Channel 4); The League of Gentlemen (BBC Two); Tina Goes Shopping (Channel 4)
Lew Grade Audience Award	The Dennis Potter Award
A Touch of Frost (ITV); Dinnerladies (BBC One); Ground Force (BBC One); The Vicar of Dibley (BBC One); Walking with Dinosaurs (BBC One)	Tony Marchant
The Alan Clarke Award	Special Award
Peter Kosminsky	The Avengers – Honor Blackman, Joanna Lumley, Diana Rigg and Linda Thorson

== Programmes with multiple nominations ==
Programmes that received multiple nominations
Nominations	Programme
4	The Royle Family
3	Lost for Words
3	The Vicar of Dibley
3	Wives and Daughters
2
2	Dinnerladies
2	The League of Gentlemen
2	Shooting the Past
2	So Graham Norton
2	Walking with Dinosaurs

Networks that received multiple nominations
Nominations	Network
23	BBC One
22	Channel 4
16	BBC Two
15	ITV

== See also ==
- 2000 British Academy Television Craft Awards
