= Clarissa (TV series) =

British TV drama

Clarissa is a 1991 British period drama television miniseries starring Sean Bean, Saskia Wickham and Lynsey Baxter. It aired on BBC2 in three episodes between 27 November and 11 December 1991. Based on the 1748 novel Clarissa by Samuel Richardson, it follows a virtuous young woman who is oppressed by her ambitious family and a rake who becomes obsessed with her. It was nominated for a BAFTA TV Award for Best Drama Serial.

== Plot ==
The virtuous Clarissa (Wickham) inherits a fortune from her grandfather but gives it into the control of her jealous family. Clarissa is the image of a youthful, virtuous young woman. Lovelace (Bean) arrives to seduce Clarissa's sister Arabella (Baxter) and the two go out for a walk. Clarissa is also in the gardens and comes across the two in embrace. Lovelace catches sight of Clarissa and is immediately enchanted by her, which Arabella notices and becomes disgusted. From that point onwards, Lovelace attempts to see Clarissa again even as her family tightens their grip of control on her and bans her from seeing Lovelace. This control is primarily backed by her devious sister Arabella and brother James (Phillips), both of whom plot to foil any chances at happiness for Clarissa. Eventually the family decides that Clarissa will marry the wealthy Mr. Solmes (Firth). In an attempt to force her hand in this marriage, the family bans Clarissa from writing or sending letters and removes Clarissa's dear friend Anna Howe (Norris) from the household, also replacing a maid who informs James about Clarissa's every move. Clarissa repeatedly tries to reach her family, including having her new handmaid deliver letters to her uncle, father, and mother. All three of whom she used to be close to, the handmaid returns with all three letters having been ripped up and unread. Her brother and sister also physically incapacitate Clarissa and force the realization of a dull future with Mr. Solmes onto her.

Realizing the severity of her situation and feeling isolated, Clarissa feels forced to seek the protection of Lovelace and his family. Clarissa delivers a letter to Lovelace through a loose brick in the henhouse. Clarissa dreams that night of her wedding, all in white, with her family in attendance. Lovelace appears and draws his sword on her family in threat before turning it towards Clarissa and fatally stabbing her through the heart. Lovelace acts genuine towards Clarissa but is actually a rake who wants to seduce her. Clarissa leaves on the night of her letter to meet Lovelace and ends up, reluctantly, going with him to an inn. The two sleep in separate rooms but Lovelace blatantly hints at his true intentions. They bicker the next day and Clarissa continues to hold on to her virtue and deny Lovelace his affections. Lovelace continues to press her, but changes tactics to beg Clarissa for help in becoming a better man himself. He approaches Clarissa with the Bible and informs her that he is practicing reformation. She agrees to assist him in his repentance but wonders what Lovelace's true intentions are.

He lodges her with a madam and her prostitutes. Her reputation ruined, she tries to run away, but is tricked into coming back, ostensibly to marry him and restore her reputation. As the whores hold her down, Lovelace rapes her. He insists he wants to marry her, but she wants no part of him and escapes. Distraught, Clarissa starves herself to death. Lovelace's family reject him and his erstwhile friend kills him for ruining her.

== Cast ==
- Saskia Wickham as Clarissa Harlowe
- Sean Bean as Robert Lovelace
- Jonny Phillips as James Harlowe
- Lynsey Baxter as Bella Harlowe
- Hermione Norris as Anna Howe
- Sean Pertwee as Jack Belford
- Jeffry Wickham as Mr. Harlowe
- Ralph Riach as Uncle Anthony
- Cathryn Harrison as Mrs. Sinclair
- Shirley Henderson as Sally
- Lucy Robinson as Deb
- Julian Firth as Solmes

== Accolades ==
Award	Nominee(s)	Result
British Academy Television Award for Best Drama Serial	Kevin Loader, Robert Bierman, Janet Barron, David Nokes	Nominated
British Academy Television Craft Award for Best Film or Video Photography (Fiction)	John McGlashan	Nominated
British Academy Television Craft Award for Best Costume Design	Ken Trew	Nominated
British Academy Television Craft Award for Best Film or Video Editor (Fiction)	Bill Wright	Nominated
British Academy Television Craft Awards for Best Design	Gerry Scott	Nominated
