= Jonny Kennedy =

British sufferer of epidermolysis bullosa dystrophica (1966–2003)

Jonathan "Jonny" Kennedy (4 November 1966 – 26 September 2003) was a British man who had a rare inherited condition known as dystrophic epidermolysis bullosa (EB or DEB). Kennedy ultimately died of skin cancer, a complication of EB.

== Biography ==
Kennedy was born in North Shields, Tyne and Wear, and spent most of his life in neighbouring Northumberland. He had a severe form of dystrophic epidermolysis bullosa and was born with no skin on his left leg.

In September 2002, Kennedy was diagnosed with terminal cancer and he was given a year to live. He was a Spiritualist who saw death as "a freedom and an escape."

Kennedy died in 2003 at the age of 36, whilst being filmed for a documentary, on a train returning from a meeting at 10 Downing Street with Cherie Blair.

One of Kennedy's favourite bands was Queen; at his funeral, the Queen song "Don't Stop Me Now" was played. His childhood friend the Lord Redesdale was in attendance and spoke as per Kennedy's request. He was cremated and his ashes were scattered at the Tenantry Column in Alnwick.

== Documentary ==
After he was diagnosed with terminal skin cancer, Kennedy teamed up with filmmaker Patrick Collerton to make a video diary documenting the final few months of his life in order to raise awareness of his condition. In the film, The Boy Whose Skin Fell Off, which also featured interviews with his friends and family, Kennedy opens up about his feelings concerning his impending death, and offers a glimpse into the life of someone with his condition.

The Boy Whose Skin Fell Off was originally intended for release only on local channels until it attracted the attention of Channel 4, who bought the film for national scheduling. When the film was first broadcast in March 2004 on Channel 4 in the UK, it received critical acclaim and attracted around five million viewers. It also helped raise £500,000 for the charity DebRA, with the donations used to fund research, and to support families in the region affected by epidermolysis bullosa. The documentary was voted the sixth most popular film in the Channel 4 programme The 50 Greatest Documentaries of All Time, in 2005. However, certain medical professionals considered it "too graphic" and noted that it had caused anxiety and distress in patients with similar conditions due to its focus on Johnny's impending death.

The documentary was aired again on Channel 4 in May 2020.
