= Great Expectations (1999 film) =

- Based on: Great Expectations by Charles Dickens
- Written by: Tony Marchant
- Directed by: Julian Jarrold
- Starring: Ioan Gruffudd; Justine Waddell; Charlotte Rampling; Bernard Hill; Clive Russell; Ian McDiarmid; Daniel Evans; Emma Cunniffe; Alex Holbrook; James Hillier
- Theme music composer: Maurice Jarre & Joe Pereira
- Country of origin: United Kingdom
- Original languages: English; Greek
- No. of episodes: 2

Production
- Producer: David Snodin
- Cinematography: David Odd
- Editor: Chris Gill
- Running time: 168 minutes
- Production companies: BBC Worldwide; WGBH

Original release
- Network: BBC Two
- Release: 12 April 1999

Great Expectations is a 1999 television film adaptation of Charles Dickens's 1861 novel of the same name. It was aired on BBC Two in the UK originally in two parts between 12 and 13 April 1999, and on Masterpiece Theatre in the US.

== Plot ==
Estranged working-class boy Pip, whom is being raised by his harsh sister, stumbles upon a hunted criminal who threatens him and demands food. Pip, while terrified, takes pity on the man, who, despite his roguelike appearance and rough Charicter, is grateful and appreciative of Pip's help. With his remaining family struggling financially, delight ensues, when Miss Havisham, a local wealthy aging lady takes a curiosity on Pip. Pip however, is uncomfortable to learn upon meeting her, that she is a highly embittered women who was jilted at the alter many years ago, and still remains in her wedding dress to this day. Knowing there are to be opportunities bestowed upon him, and keen to increase their social standing, the family strongly encourage Pip to continue visits to Miss Havisham, for her "entertainment". This however hides the true and more sinister reason for Miss Havishams' invitations, which is so that she can delude and torment Pip, by using her adopted daughter Estella, a beautiful, but vain, mean-spirited girl, as a means to break Pips heart. As Pip continues with frequent visits, and knowing that her designs to have Pip fall in love with Estella are working, Miss Havisham eventually relinquishes Pip, hearing from Joe, a kindly Blacksmith who is also in relationship with his sister, that he is going train him as his apprentice. Pip is hurt when he sees derision and mockery from Estella, who is from a higher social background and sees this beneath her. Time passes, Estella has been sent away to be educated, meanwhile Pip struggles at the blacksmith forge, against his fellow apprentice Orlick, who hates Pip for being favoured by those around him. Orlick loses his job after a dispute escalates, and plans to exact revenge. Mysteriously, a man by the name of Jaggers arrives, who appears to be highly well informed and somewhat manipulative. Pip is told that he is to be beneficiary of property, wealth and increased social status, by an unknown patron. Pip is to be sent to London to become a gentleman. Naively, Pip wrongly assumes that this must be the work of Miss Havisham, believing she intends to have him to take Estella as his Bride. Pip goes to London, and quickly learns the ways of the gentleman, but his attempts at upward social mobility, and his hope to improve his chances with Estella, are stifled, when his overspending leaves him in considerable debt. He then visits home to find his sister murdered, and suspects Orlick. Now a gentleman, he also learns more about Estella during this time, though the word of mouth of other suitors, as well Miss Havishams' ultimate goal. All along she has been grooming and using Estella as a means to "break the hearts of all men", in revenge for being left at the alter on her own wedding day by her fiancé. Pip becomes enraged when a fellow gentleman, Bentley Drummle, declares for his affections for Estella, and that he will make overtures of marriage to her, as Pip does not believe Estella even knows of him, and suspects this is a foul blow, meant to ridicule him. Later though, Pip is forced to apologise after finding out that Estella and Drummle do indeed know each other, even dancing on several occasions. More to his anguish, he then reads from Estella's own letters, that she is actually considering Drummles marriage proposal favourably. Pip, finding Estella more beautiful than ever, embarrasses himself by becoming intoxicated at a ball, confronting Estella about her motivations, and questioning Drummles suitability to her. He tells her that while officially a gentleman on paper, Drummle has a dark and unpleasant reputation. Dismissive, but seeing Pip in pain, Estella allows herself to admit that she does hold a fondness for him, above other men. She then goes on to say though, that in matters of love, she feels nothing at all, for any man, and that she long since gave Pip fair warning of her nature. She finishes by saying she will proceed with the marriage to Drummle and that it is of financial and mutual benefit, adding there will be little to no romantic love, as that is not the purpose of the marriage, and that Drummle himself is aware of this. Pip, while devastated for himself, at least takes satisfaction in knowing that Estella has no real love for any other man either. He decides to move on with his life for a while. As time goes on, it transpires that Pips' benefactor is none other than the escaped convict he met when he was a boy, and after the two become familiar with each other, they develop a strong fatherly and son bond. Pip works out from his stories, that he must be Estellas biological father, having already met Estellas biological mother through Jaggers, her being his housekeeper. Furious, Pip confronts Miss Havisham, having uncovered this conspiracy, knowing that Estella has been used and damaged deliberately, by those around her. Miss Havisham initially justifies her actions to Pip, but after helping him settle some debts, she starts to show remorse for how she raised Estella, and for tormenting Pip. Angry and unwilling to hear more, Pip turns to leave, when Miss Havisham clumsily nears an open flame, and her wedding dress catches, burning her to death. At the funeral Pip and Estella briefly reunite, but Pip finds to his horror that Estella is subdued and withdrawn, appearing to be locked in an abusive and cruel marriage to Drummle. She remarks with dry sarcasm that he whips his horse, and she spared in comparison. She then indicates that it doesn't matter to her, since only warm blooded creatures feel pain, and she is cold and devoid of feelings. Pip, while distraught, does not convince Estella to change her feelings or situation, only asking that she wish him good fortune. Pip then finds himself on the wrong side of the law, when they catch up with his Benefactor who is still a wanted man, Pip is arrested and denounced, losing much of his credibility and high standing. He is rescued and his innocence is bought by Joe, his old master of blacksmithing. Pip is then quickly reduced reputationally, back to that of a working-class boy. Returning to have a look at Miss Havishams' mansion, mainly to set his demons to rest, Pip is surprised to find Estella has already taken up residence there. She has finally separated from Drummle, and the house was left to her in Miss Havishams will. He enters and the two meet once again. Pip asks what she intends to do now she is free of Drummle, and when she says she'll be fine, Pip goads her by asking if she is going to continue living by Miss Havishams' lessons, possibly becoming the next Miss Havisham, and mockingly suggesting her to send for another young village boy to entertain her. Emotional and traumatised, finally Estella breaks. Realising the damage she has not only done to Pip, but to herself. The two then embrace, Pip declares his love for her and kisses her, which she returns. After a few short moments though, she breaks away, states that, in reality that they cannot be together, to which Pip even agrees with her, and resigns to this fact. Dignity in tact however, he turns to leave, but Estella is not ready to let him go. She asks him if it is really necessary for them to choose to not spend any time together, just because they cannot act on their love for each other. To which Pip considers her words. The film ends with Estella and Pip playing cards, and Estella telling him to be sure he makes arrangements in well advance, next time he wishes to come visit, as she is a very busy women. Pip sarcastically replies that it will depend on his work schedule. The two then burst out laughing, leaving things very much ambiguous between them, but with a hopeful touch.

== Cast ==
- Ioan Gruffudd as Pip
  - Gabriel Thomson as Young Pip
- Justine Waddell as Estella
  - Gemma Gregory as Young Estella
- Emma Cunniffe as Biddy
  - Laura Aikman as Young Biddy
- Charlotte Rampling as Miss Havisham
- Bernard Hill as Magwitch
- Clive Russell as Joe
- Ian McDiarmid as Jaggers
- Laila Morse as Molly
- Daniel Evans as Herbert Pocket
  - Laurence Dobiesz as Young Herbert
- James Hillier as Bentley Drummle
- Tony Curran as Orlick

== Filming locations ==
The production filmed at a number of Kent locations including Sheerness Docks, Kingswear Castle Paddlesteamer, Chatham Docks and the River Medway and in Edinburgh.

== Awards ==
In 2000, it won the BAFTA TV Award for Best Costume Design, but failed to win Best Design, Best Make Up/Hair, Best Photography and Lighting (Fiction/Entertainment) and Best Sound (Fiction/Entertainment). It had also won the 1999 RTS Craft & Design Award for Best Sound in Drama; Best Production Design in Drama; Best Lighting, and Photography & Camera; and was nominated for Best Tape & Film Editing in Drama. It was nominated for, but did not win, the 1999 Emmy Award for Outstanding Miniseries.
