= Our Mutual Friend (1998 serial) =

- Based on: Our Mutual Friend by Charles Dickens
- Written by: Sandy Welch
- Directed by: Julian Farino
- Starring: Paul McGann; Steven Mackintosh; Keeley Hawes; Anna Friel; Peter Vaughan; David Morrissey; Dominic Mafham
- Country of origin: United Kingdom
- Original language: English

Production
- Running time: 360 min.

Original release
- Network: BBC Two
- Release: 9 March – 30 March 1998

Our Mutual Friend is a British four-part television serial broadcast in 1998 and adapted from Charles Dickens's novel Our Mutual Friend (1864–1865).

== Cast ==
- Anna Friel as Bella Wilfer
- Steven Mackintosh as John Harmon
- Keeley Hawes as Lizzie Hexam
- Paul McGann as Eugene Wrayburn
- Peter Vaughan as Mr Boffin
- David Morrissey as Bradley Headstone
- Dominic Mafham as Mortimer Lightwood
- David Bradley as Rogue Riderhood
- Kenneth Cranham as Silas Wegg
- Timothy Spall as Mr Venus
- Pam Ferris as Mrs Boffin
- Katy Murphy as Jenny Wren
- Doon Mackichan as Sophronia Lammle
- Anthony Calf as Alfred Lammle
- Michael Culkin as Mr Veneering
- Martin Hancock as Sloppy
- Edna Doré as Betty Higden
- Margaret Tyzack as Lady Tippins
- Roger Frost as police inspector
- David Schofield as Gaffer Hexam
- Paul Bailey as Charley Hexam
- Peter Wright as Mr Wilfer
- Heather Tobias as Mrs Wilfer
- Catriona Yuill as Lavinia Wilfer

== Production ==
The Kingswear Castle paddle-steamer was used for the drama in the episode when Bella Wilfer and the Boffins go on a family day out. The scene was shot on the River Medway next to the boat's then moorings in The Historic Dockyard Chatham. In 2013 the ship returned to use on the River Dart in Devon. The back streets of the workhouse were filmed in The Historic Dockyard Chatham.

== Awards ==
Winner:

- 1999: British Academy Television Awards - Best Design, Best Drama Serial, Best Sound, Best Make Up

Nominated:

- 1999: Broadcasting Press Guild Awards - Best Actor, Best Drama
