= David Myerscough-Jones =

David Myerscough-Jones FCSD (15 September 1934 – 21 April 2010) was an English film, television, and theatre production designer. He spent the majority of his career with BBC TV, as well as in the theatre and opera production companies. He worked with the British composer Benjamin Britten on Peter Grimes (1969 Snape Maltings, Aldeburgh), Owen Wingrave (1970 BBC TV World Premier, Snape Maltings), and Die Winteriesse (1970 Britten Piano, Peter Pears Tenor).

== Early life ==
He was born on 15 September 1934 in Southport, Lancashire, England. He studied art and design at the Southport School of Art and the Central School of Art in London where he graduated with distinction. He spent several years in theatres around the UK, at Glasgow Citizens Theatre (Scotland), Leatherhead (Surrey) Hornchurch, London (where he met his wife Ursula ‘Pelo’ Cumpston; both worked on Owen Wingrave), and the Mermaid, London. In 1965 he joined the BBC Design Department. His great experience in repertory theatre gave him a unique and noticeable style.

== Career in design ==
Driven by his passion for music and in particular opera (notably the works of Richard Wagner), he was chosen to design the BBC TV production of The Flying Dutchman, starring Norman Bailey as the Dutchman, which won Myerscough-Jones an award from the Royal Television Society (1976) for his designs. He also collaborated with Opera Director Jonathan Miller to create The Beggar’s Opera starring Roger Daltrey and Mozart's Cosi Fan Tutte, amongst others.

Myerscough-Jones also designed a great number of other BBC TV dramas, notably Thérèse Raquin, which won him a BAFTA award for Best Design as well as D and AD Gold and Silver – 1980, The Theban Trilogy (ACE Nomination), How Many Miles to Babylon, A Midsummer Night's Dream, Macbeth, All's Well that Ends Well, Othello, Virtuoso, The Master Builder, Metamorphosis, Bomber Harris, and Circles of Deceit.

He left the BBC in 1990 and continued his career as a freelance designer. He teamed up with Opera Director Designer John Pascoe to design a production of La Bohème starring Renée Fleming. This was followed by productions of La Traviata, the Turn of the Screw, Don Giovanni, and Rigoletto for Bath and Wessex Opera, and Il Trovatore and the Barber of Seville in America (Walnut Creak) . Also at this time he collaborated with lifelong friend Theatre Director Michael Friend for various theatre touring productions including Fado Farces and Stagelands starring Trevor Bannister.

Aside from his specialization on musical productions, Myerscough-Jones was also known for his designs for Doctor Who – The Web of Fear.

== Retirement and later years ==
He took his retirement in Burgundy and finally in Saint-Omer, which impressed him for its rich history and its artistic and musical heritage. He is buried at the Bruyéres Cemetery in Longuenesse, with his wife, Pelo. Many of his artistic works, including production models and artwork, have been given to the town of Saint-Omer by the David Myerscough-Jones Association. Some of this material is available to see at La Salle de Concert, Place Saint Jean, Saint-Omer.

== David Myerscough-Jones Association ==
This association has been created to preserve the work (both professional and private works of art) of David Myerscough-Jones for design and art students and equally all enthusiasts of the Arts.

== See also ==
- David Myerscough-Jones at the Fry Gallery
