= Ken Westbury =

British cinematographer (1927–2023)

Albert Kenneth Westbury BSC (5 January 1927 – 28 April 2023) was a British cinematographer, known mostly for his work at the BBC. He was nominated for three BAFTAs, including for Dr. Fischer of Geneva (1984), Tender is the Night (1985), and The Singing Detective (1986).

== Life and career ==
Albert Kenneth Westbury was born in Shepherd's Bush, London, in 1927. He began working for Ealing Studios in 1942, performing errands before working his way up to a clapper loader and focus puller. He completed his national service with the Life Guards.

Westbury moved to the BBC as a camera operator and director of photography, after they acquired Ealing in 1956. He remained on the BBC's staff until he turned 60, which was then their required retirement age. He then became a freelancer, working on projects for the BBC, ITV, and Channel 4, in addition to work on theatrical films and commercials. He retired in 2003.

Westbury was married to the former Doreen White from 1949 to her death in 2013; they had four children. He died from skin cancer on 28 April 2023, at the age of 96.
