= 2000 British Academy Television Craft Awards =

Technical achievements in television awards ceremony

1st British Academy Television Craft Awards
- Date: 30 April 2000
- Site: 195 Piccadilly, London, UK
- Hosted by: Gabby Yorath

The 1st Annual British Academy Television Craft Awards were presented by the British Academy of Film and Television Arts (BAFTA) on 30 April 2000, with Gabby Yorath (later known as Gabby Logan) presided over the event. The awards were held at BAFTA headquarters at 195 Piccadilly, Westminster, London, and given in recognition of technical achievements in the British television of 1999. Previously, craft awards were handed out in conjunction with the television awards which, from 1968 to 1999, was held as a joint event with the film awards.

== Winners and nominees ==
Winners are listed first and highlighted in boldface; the nominees are listed below alphabetically and not in boldface.

Best Make Up and Hair Design	Best Production Design
**Wives and Daughters** – **Lisa Westcott**; French and Saunders – Jan Sewell; Great Expectations – Fran Needham; Oliver Twist – Lesley Lamont-Fisher	**Wives and Daughters** – **Gerry Scott**; Hornblower – Rob Harris; Great Expectations – Alice Normington; Warriors – Phil Roberson
Best Visual Effects and Graphic Design	Best Costume Design
**The Vice** – **Philip Dupee**; 2000 Today – Liz Friedman and Kevin Hill; Cold Feet – Peter Terry, Matt Howarth and Susan Voudouris; Eye of the Storm – Peter Phillips	**Great Expectations** – **Odile Dicks-Mireaux**; All the King's Men – Howard Burden; The League of Gentlemen – Yves Barre; Oliver Twist – Rosalind Ebbutt
Best Photography – Factual	Best Photography and Lighting – Fiction/Entertainment
**Wildlife Special: Tiger** – **Chip Houseman** and **Hugh Miles**; Lost on Everest: The Search For Mallory and Irvine – Ned Johnston; Michael Palin's Hemingway Adventure – Nigel Meakin; Shanghai Vice – Phil Agland	**Wives and Daughters** – **Fred Tammes**; David Copperfield – Andy Collins; Great Expectations – David Odd; Warriors – Richard Greatrex
Best Editing – Factual	Best Editing – Fiction/Entertainment
**Inside Story: Child of the Death Camps**; Malcolm And Barbara – A Love Story – Kim Horton; The Second World War In Colour – Steve Moore; Shanghai Vice – Nikki Oldroyd and David Dickie	**The Royle Family** – **Tony Cranstoun**; Cold Feet – Tim Waddell; David Copperfield – Philip Kloss; Queer as Folk – Tony Cranstoun
Best Sound – Factual	Best Sound – Fiction/Entertainment
**Michael Palin's Hemingway Adventure** – **John Pritchard** and **Bob Jackson**; Eye of the Storm – Ian Hills, Dion Stuart and Samantha Handy; Paddington Green – John Rodda, Dudley Houlden and Paul Roberts; Shanghai Vice – Sound Team	**Warriors** – **David Old**, **Graham Headicar**, **Maurice Hillier** and **Danny Longhurst**; Great Expectations – Richard Manton, Peter Smith, Bernard O’Reilly and Terry Brown; Queer as Folk – Sound Team; Wives and Daughters – Paul Hamblin, Peter Brill, Ian Wilkinson and Danny Sheehan
Best Original Television Music
**Walking With Dinosaurs** – **Ben Bartlett**; Cold Feet – Mark Russell; Oliver Twist – Paul Pritchard and Elvis Costello; Queer as Folk – Murray Gold

== See also ==
- British Academy Television Awards 2000
