= Eileen Diss =

British set designer (1931–2024)

Eileen Diss RDI
- Born: 13 May 1931
- Died: 5 November 2024 (aged 93)
- Education: Ilford County High School for Girls; Central School of Arts and Crafts
- Occupation: Set designer

Eileen Diss, RDI (13 May 1931 – 5 November 2024) was a British set designer for stage, television and film. She won six BAFTA awards, a Lifetime Achievement Award for Design from the Royal Television Society in 2002, and a BAFTA Lifetime Achievement Special Craft Award in 2006.

== Early life and education ==
Diss was born on 13 May 1931 in Leytonstone, East London, England. She was the only child of Thomas and Winifred Diss. She was educated at Ilford County High School for Girls, then an all-girls grammar school in Ilford. Aged 14, she went on a school outing to see Laurence Olivier's film version of Henry V. This sparked an interest in film and she began to attend the pictures every Saturday. Henry V had made a particular impression on her, and its medieval set designed by Carmen Dillon was particularly enamouring. She would later say; "I could draw and loved history so it seemed that design was the area to go into". After leaving school, she attended the Central School of Arts and Crafts in London, where she undertook a theatre design course.

== Career ==
In 1952, Diss joined the BBC's design department as a third assistant to the set designers; she was the only woman. As there were only ten designers, after only two weeks of training, she was designing her first sets, for Three Little Mushrooms, a children's programme, and an An American Gentleman, a TV film starring a soon to be famous John Gregson. Initially focusing on children's programmes such as Billy Bunter of Greyfriars School and Blue Peter, her scope was later broadened and she worked on Zoo Quest, the first major programme to feature David Attenborough, and The Grove Family (1954–1957), Britain's first television soap.

Diss left the BBC in 1957 or 1959, and from then onwards worked freelance in theatre, television and on film. She collaborated with Harold Pinter more than 20 times. She specialised in period dramas, and she could spend months acquiring suitable items of furniture, ornaments, and other background paraphernalia to create her "meticulous, poetically imagined sets".

In 1975, Diss was appointed Royal Designer for Industry (RDA) for "TV & Theatre Design" by the Royal Society of Arts. She was three times nominated for a Society of West End Theatre Award (later renamed the Laurence Olivier Awards) as Designer of the Year: for The Family Dance at the Criterion Theatre in 1976, for The Homecoming at the Garrick in 1978, and Measure for Measure at the National Theatre Lyttelton in 1981. She won her first BAFTA for Maigret, a TV series that ran from 1960 to 1963. She would win five more, including one in 1992 for Jeeves and Wooster. She was awarded a Lifetime Achievement Award for Design from the Royal Television Society in 2002, and a BAFTA Lifetime Achievement Special Craft Award in 2006.

== Personal life ==
In 1953, Diss married Raymond Everett. He was a pilot in the Royal Air Force and then with British Overseas Airways Corporation (BOAC). Together, they had three children; one daughter and two sons. Her husband predeceased her, dying in 1994, and she died on 5 November 2024, aged 93.

At the 97th Academy Awards, her name was mentioned in the In Memoriam section.

== Selected productions ==
Television

- Maigret (1960–1963)
- The Wednesday Play (8 episodes; 1964–1968)
- Tea Party (1965)
- W. Somerset Maugham (5 episodes; 1969–1970)
- Cider with Rosie (1971)
- Alice Through the Looking Glass (1973)
- Porterhouse Blue (1987)
- Jeeves and Wooster (1990–1993)
- A Dance to the Music of Time (1997)
- Longitude (2000)

Films

- Joseph Losey's A Doll's House, 1972
- Sweet William, 1980
- Harold Pinter's Betrayal, 1983
- Secret Places, 1984
- 84 Charing Cross Road, 1987
- A Handful of Dust, 1988
