= 2001 British Academy Television Craft Awards =

Technical achievements in television awards ceremony

2nd British Academy Television Craft Awards
- Date: 22 April 2001
- Site: Sadler's Wells Theatre, London, UK
- Hosted by: Liza Tarbuck

The British Academy Television Craft Awards of 2001 are presented by the British Academy of Film and Television Arts (BAFTA) and were held on 22 April 2001 at the Sadler's Wells Theatre, the ceremony was hosted by Liza Tarbuck.

== Winners and nominees ==
Winners will be listed first and highlighted in boldface.

Best New Director - Fiction	Best New Director - Factual
**Dominic Savage – Nice Girl**; Caroline Aherne – The Royle Family; Jon Jones – Cold Feet; Chris Morris – Jam	**Sarah MacDonald – Newsnight: A Family Affair (Special)**; Frances Byrnes – Picture This: The Pavlov Ballet; Lucy Carter – Britain At War In Colour; Jonah Weston – Anatomy Of Disgust
Best New Writer	Best Original Television Music
**Ed McCardie – Tinsel Town**; Martin McCardie – Tinsel Town; David Nicholls – Cold Feet; Damian Wayling – The Bill: A Girl’s Best Friend	**Longitude – Geoffrey Burgon**; War Behind The Wire – Daemion Barry; Elizabeth – Andy Price; Gormenghast – Richard Rodney Bennett
Best Costume Design	Best Production Design
**The League of Gentlemen – Yves Barre**; Gormenghast – Odile Dicks-Mireaux; Madame Bovary – Anushia Nieradzik; Longitude – Shirley Russell	**Longitude – Eileen Diss, Chris Lowe**; The Scarlet Pimpernel – Maurice Cain; Anna Karenina – Rob Harris; Gormenghast – Christopher Hobbs
Best Photography and Lighting - Fiction	Best Photography - Factual
**Longitude – Peter Hannan**; Clocking Off – Peter Greenhalgh; Anna Karenina – Ryszard Lenczewski; Lorna Doone – Chris Seager	**Arena: Wisconsin Death Trip – Eigil Bryld**; Australia: Beyond The Fatal Shore – David Baillie, Jeremy Pollard, Sion Michel; Endurance: Shackleton And The Antarctic – Tom Hurwitz, Scott Ransom, Sandi Sissel; Andes to Amazon – Photography Team
Best Editing - Fiction/Entertainment	Best Editing - Factual
**North Square – Jon Costelloe**; Clocking Off – Nick Arthurs, Tony Cranstoun, Edward Mansell; Longitude – Peter Coulson; Gormenghast – Paul Tothill	**Omnibus: Dudley Moore – After The Laughter – Andrew Fegen**; Britain At War In Colour – Stephen Moore; I Love 1970’s: 1974 – Craig Stobbart; A History Of Britain By Simon Schama – Editing Team
Best Make-Up and Hair Design	Best Visual Effects and Graphic Design
**Gormenghast – Joan Hills, Christine Greenwood**; Longitude – Chrissie Beveridge; Madame Bovary – Vivien Riley; The League of Gentlemen – Vanessa White	**Gormenghast – Visual Effects Team**; Horizon: Supermassive Black Holes – Simon Edgar, Gareth Edwards, Neil Cunningham; Longitude – Framestore; Private Lives Of The Pharaohs – Red Vision
Best Sound - Fiction	Best Sound - Factual
**Anna Karenina – Sound Team**; A Touch Of Frost – John Fountaine, Adam Severs; Clocking Off – Sound Team; Longitude – Sound Team	**The South Bank Show: Simon Rattle On Judith Weir – Paul Vigars, Alex Thompson**; Britain At War In Colour – Brian Aherne; Volcano – Victor Chainey, Chris Phinikas; Omnibus: Dudley Moore – After The Laughter – Michael Lax

=== Special awards ===
- **Brian Tufano**
- **World Productions**

== See also ==
- 2001 British Academy Television Awards
