= Wives and Daughters (1999 TV series) =

British television miniseries

- DVD cover
- Genre: Drama
- Based on: Wives and Daughters by Elizabeth Gaskell
- Written by: Andrew Davies; Elizabeth Gaskell
- Directed by: Nicholas Renton
- Starring: Justine Waddell; Bill Paterson; Francesca Annis; Keeley Hawes; Tom Hollander; Iain Glen; Anthony Howell; Michael Gambon
- Composer: John E. Keane
- Country of origin: United Kingdom
- Original language: English
- No. of series: 1
- No. of episodes: 4

Production
- Executive producers: Rebecca Eaton; Jane Tranter
- Producer: Sue Birtwistle
- Cinematography: Fred Tammes
- Editor: Kevin Lester
- Running time: 301 minutes
- Production companies: BBC; WGBH Boston

Original release
- Network: BBC One
- Release: 28 November – 19 December 1999

Wives and Daughters is a 1999 four-part BBC serial adapted from the 1864 novel Wives and Daughters: An Everyday Story by Victorian author Elizabeth Gaskell.

The series was a joint production of the BBC and WGBH Boston, an American public broadcast station and 'won high audience ratings' when it first screened in the UK in 1999. Its audience rivalry with an adaptation of Charles Dickens' Oliver Twist, screened on ITV at the same time, was dubbed 'the battle of the bonnets'. It appeared in the USA on BBC America in August 2000 and was later shown on PBS.

It focuses on Molly Gibson (Justine Waddell), the daughter of the town doctor and the changes that occur in her life after her widowed father chooses to remarry. The union brings into her once-quiet life an ever-proper stepmother (Francesca Annis) who is 'too vain and shallow to care for anything beyond her improved social status'. Also a flirtatious stepsister, Cynthia (Keeley Hawes), while a friendship with the local squire brings about an unexpected romance. A New York Times review of the series in 2001 said 'The entire cast gets the characters right.'

Written by Andrew Davies, produced by Sue Birtwistle and directed by Nicholas Renton, the programme also features Michael Gambon, Penelope Wilton, Bill Paterson and Rosamund Pike.

== Production ==
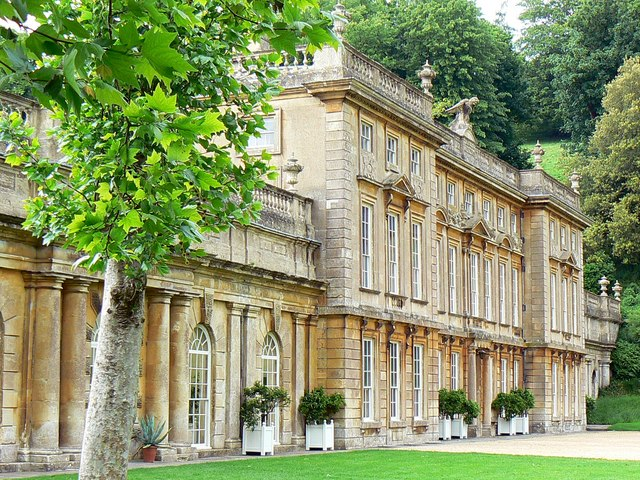
Dyrham Park house where some of the exterior scenes were filmed

Davies and Birtwistle collaborated on the BBC's television popular adaptation of Jane Austen's Pride and Prejudice in 1995. Following that success the BBC 'effectively told the duo they could adapt any book they wished', leading to Wives and Daughters. Birtwhistle described Gaskell's novel as 'strong, direct and passionate' and this offered 'the necessary elements for a popular classic TV drama'.

Filming was based at Elstree Studios with additional scenes shot at historic properties across England. Great Chalfield Manor, Wiltshire was used for exterior scenes for the Hamley family home, while interior scenes were filmed at Levens Hall in Kendal, Cumbria. Wentworth Woodhouse, South Yorkshire was used for Cumnor Towers, the grand family home Molly visits as a child when she first encounters her future step-mother. Additional outdoor scenes were shot at Dyrham Park in South Gloucestershire.

== Cast ==
- Justine Waddell as Molly Gibson
- Bill Paterson as Dr Gibson
- Francesca Annis as Mrs Kirkpatrick/Mrs Gibson
- Keeley Hawes as Cynthia Kirkpatrick
- Iain Glen as Mr Preston
- Richard Coyle as Mr Coxe
- Anthony Howell as Roger Hamley
- Tom Hollander as Osborne Hamley
- Michael Gambon as Squire Hamley
- Penelope Wilton as Mrs Hamley
- Rosamund Pike as Lady Harriet Cumnor
- Deborah Findlay as Miss Phoebe
- Barbara Flynn as Miss Browning
- Barbara Leigh-Hunt as Lady Cumnor
- Ian Carmichael as Lord Cumnor
- Tonia Chauvet as Aimee
- Elizabeth Spriggs as Mrs Goodenough
- Peter Copley as Robinson
- Shaughan Seymour as Lord Hollingford
- Fred Pearson as Sheepshanks
- Jemima Rooper as Lizzie Goodenough
- Georgie Glen as Miss Hornblower
- Dariel Pertwee as Lady Cuxhaven
- Richard Dempsey as Mr Bold
- Anna Maguire as Young Molly
- Finty Williams as Miss Danby
- Andrew Havill as Sir Charles Morton
- Michael Bryant as Dr Nichols
- Dilys Hamlett as the Duchess
- Sheridan Smith as the Housemaid
- Neil Kemp as the Footman

== Reception ==
At the 2000 British Academy Television Awards, the series was nominated for seven awards and won four including Best Actor (Television) for Michael Gambon as Squire Hamley. Gambon's performance was described as: 'Gruff on the outside, with a huge sentimental streak, the country squire is a familiar type, but he makes him seem endearing and fresh.'
