= Episode 4 (Baby Reindeer) =

- Baby Reindeer episode
- Episode no.: Episode 4
- Directed by: Weronika Tofilska
- Written by: Richard Gadd
- Cinematography by: Krzysztof Trojnar
- Editing by: Benjamin Gerstein; Peter H. Oliver
- Original air date: 11 April 2024
- Running time: 44 minutes

Guest appearances
- Shalom Brune-Franklin as Keeley; Michael Wildman as Greggsy; Danny Kirrane as Gino; Leah MacRae as Gwen; Thomas Coombes as Daniels; Will Hislop as Billy; Gerry Lynch as a punter; Gemma Page as a drama school teacher; Grace Parry as Date One; Phillip Suddick as Date Two; Kairi Liu as Date Three; Stephen Erhirhi as Date Four; JJ Bull as a football commentator

Episode chronology
← Previous "Episode 3"	Next → "Episode 5"

"Episode 4" is the fourth episode of the psychological black comedy-drama thriller television miniseries Baby Reindeer. The episode was directed by Weronika Tofilska and written by the series creator Richard Gadd, and was released on Netflix on 11 April 2024 along with the rest of the series. The episode recounts Donny's early comedy career, when he was groomed and raped by a television writer named Darrien.

== Plot ==
Donny finally reports Martha to the police, six months after the stalking began. When asked why it took so long for him to report, Donny has a flashback.

Five years earlier, while participating in the Edinburgh Festival Fringe, Donny meets a television writer, Darrien. Darrien helps Donny improve his comedy routine, and his gigs begin growing in popularity. Before the festival ends, Darrien seemingly disappears, and Donny presumes he returned to London. Donny attends drama school in Oxford, though he misses Darrien and is unhappy with his current career status after the success in Edinburgh. One day, Donny receives a call from Darrien, inviting him to write a television pilot together, and Donny is elated.

Donny brings his work-in-progress script to Darrien's flat, but rather than reading his work, Darrien invites him to get high together. They take MDMA and GHB, which makes Donny vomit. While patting Donny's back, Darrien digitally rapes him. Afterward, he pours Donny a glass of almond milk as if nothing happened.

At school one day, Donny receives a call from Darrien, who tells him that a network loves his pilot and wants to work with him. Donny begins spending his weekends at Darrien's flat, taking hard drugs and being groomed with promises of career success. On several instances, Donny regains consciousness to find Darrien sexually assaulting him. One evening, Donny takes LSD and has a bad trip, so Darrien offers him GHB for relaxation. As Donny falls in and out of consciousness, Darrien anally rapes him. Despite the traumatic experience, Donny recounts that he stayed at Darrien's flat for days afterward before leaving.

Donny's mental health plummets after the rape. Feeling angry and sexually confused, he begins having reckless sex with people of all genders, putting himself in risky situations to understand the rape and why it happened to him. He goes on numerous dates, ditching them before the evening is over, until he meets Teri. Despite falling in love with her, he feels anger and shame.

In the present day, back at the police station, Donny notes the irony of reporting Martha but having never reported Darrien.

== Production ==
=== Development ===
Director Weronika Tofilska visited Edinburgh before the Edinburgh Festival Fringe for research purposes. For the apartment set, she stated, "The concept was very much that, during the day, this flat feels almost cozy. The design is a bit quirky, but there’s a coziness, a lot of softness, warm colors. When it changes to night, it has this quiet, very warm, orangey feel that trends towards red. It has this slightly nightmarish feel."

=== Filming ===
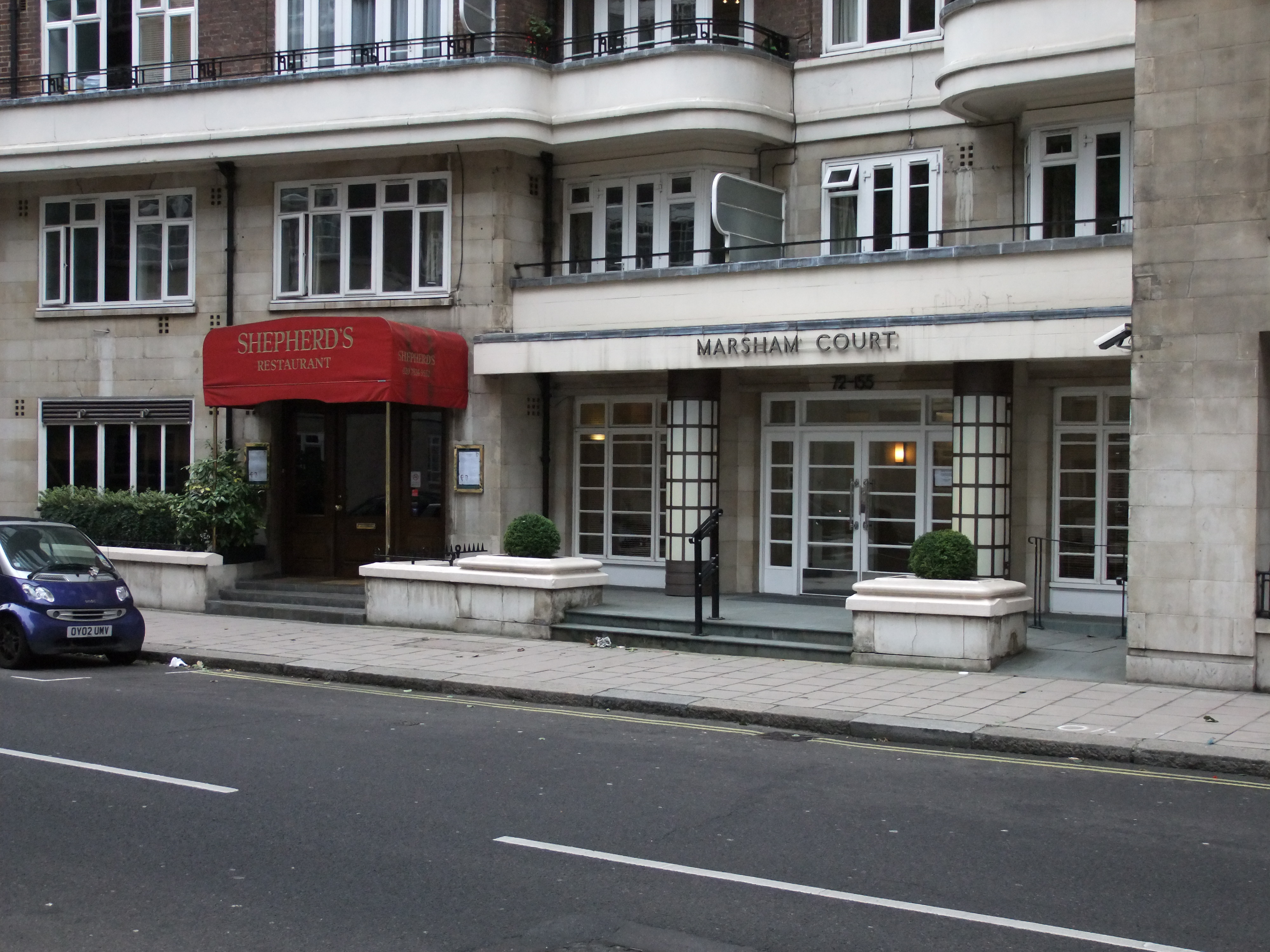
Marsham Court served as the exterior of Darrien's apartment building.

The episode was shot on location in Edinburgh, with specific locations including the Grassmarket and the Royal Mile. The Hoppy, a pub in Meadowbank, was used as the Fringe venue where Donny performs. Exterior shots were also filmed at Marsham Court in Westminster.

While the majority of the series was shot on a 35 mm lens, Krzysztof Trojnar, the director of photography, shot the scenes in Darrien's apartment on a wider lens; Tofilska noted that this was to give the audience a feeling of alienation and discomfort. For the scenes where Donny is high, Trojnar employed a handheld camera, rather than a dolly.

Richard Gadd noted that his hardest days on set were filming the fourth episode. He stated, "God bless Tom Goodman-Hill for being, like, the sweetest, kindest man, because that was a very intense few days. Those feelings can come back into your body, so I was very uncomfortable. I remember a few days where I found myself going to set and thinking, 'I wouldn’t mind a traffic jam today.'" He also noted that several crew members cried while filming the episode.

== Reception ==
=== Critical response ===
Marah Eakin of Vulture gave the episode four stars out of five, calling the writing "really amazing" and stating, "You need to see this episode to really absorb it. Once you do, its images, feelings, and expressions will undoubtedly be burned into your brain...."

Therese Lacson of Collider wrote, "The series, up until that moment, is serious but hasn't become completely devastating. After Episode 4, we are now fully aware of Donny's truth and the struggles he's been facing. Recent breakups, struggles with his sexuality, difficulty in his career, and even his relationship with Martha are seen in a new light. It is absolutely soul-crushing to connect the dots of Donny's life with the benefit of hindsight, and that's where Gadd achieves brilliance."

Louisa Mellor of Den of Geek called the episode "stunning" and wrote, "This exposing and truthful episode is the pivot on which Baby Reindeer turns, transforming a good show into a great one. Episode four is like a light switching on behind an X-Ray scan of Donny’s mind, illuminating its previously dark paths, connections and areas of damage."

Brian Farvour of The Playlist wrote, "While gruesome, shocking, and often appalling, this degenerate section elucidates why Donny tolerated Martha for so long. And it's a white-hot, distressingly frank, and vulnerable psychological tale of shame, insecurity, shattered ego, self-doubt, and crippled self-confidence. What it ultimately reveals, as well, is a show that's infinitely more layered and intricate than just a stalker narrative, a genre arguably exploited as a Trojan Horse ruse to explore something much more emotionally complex, damaged, and anguishing."

Miles Ellingham of British GQ wrote, "It's truly nightmarish and, what's more, it's based on Gadd's real-life experiences, making it one of the most radically confessional episodes put to television in a long time. The horror of episode four is neatly packaged in darkening gradations."

Rebecca Nicholson of The Guardian called it the "most chilling TV episode of the entire year".

=== Accolades ===
Award	Year	Category	Nominee	Result	Ref.
Costume Designers Guild Awards	2025	Excellence in Contemporary Television	Mekel Bailey (for "Episode 4")	Nominated	
Primetime Creative Arts Emmy Awards	2024	Outstanding Contemporary Costumes for a Limited or Anthology Series or Movie	Mekel Bailey and Imogen Holness (for "Episode 4")	Nominated	
Primetime Creative Arts Emmy Awards	2024	Outstanding Music Supervision	Catherine Grieves (for "Episode 4")	Nominated	
Primetime Creative Arts Emmy Awards	2024	Outstanding Picture Editing for a Limited or Anthology Series or Movie	Peter H. Oliver and Benjamin Gerstein (for "Episode 4")	Won	
Primetime Emmy Awards	2024	Outstanding Supporting Actor in a Limited or Anthology Series or Movie	Tom Goodman-Hill (for "Episode 4")	Nominated	
Primetime Emmy Awards	2024	Outstanding Directing for a Limited or Anthology Series or Movie	Weronika Tofilska (for "Episode 4")	Nominated	
