= Episode 1 (Baby Reindeer) =

- Baby Reindeer episode
- Episode no.: Episode 1
- Directed by: Weronika Tofilska
- Written by: Richard Gadd
- Cinematography by: Krzysztof Trojnar
- Editing by: Peter H. Oliver
- Original air date: 11 April 2024
- Running time: 32 minutes

Guest appearances
- Nina Sosanya as Liz; Michael Wildman as Greggsy; Danny Kirrane as Gino; Thomas Coombes as Daniels; Miya Ocego as a waiter; Leroy Brito as a compere

Episode chronology
← Previous —	Next → "Episode 2"

"Episode 1" is the series premiere of the British psychological black comedy-drama thriller television miniseries Baby Reindeer. The episode was directed by Weronika Tofilska and written by the series creator Richard Gadd, and was released on Netflix on 11 April 2024 along with the rest of the series.

For her role as Martha in the episode, Jessica Gunning won the Primetime Emmy Award for Outstanding Supporting Actress in a Limited or Anthology Series or Movie.

== Plot ==
Donny Dunn reports his stalker, Martha, to the police, and the police officer questions why it took so long for him to report.

Six months earlier, Donny, a struggling comedian, is working as a barman at a London pub where he meets Martha. Donny tries to take Martha's order, but she states that she cannot afford anything, so he gives her a cup of tea free of charge. Martha, who was initially despondent, brightens up. She begins frequenting the pub daily, and the two form a friendship. Donny humours her claims of being an important lawyer, despite her spending days in the pub with him. Having struggled with feeling invisible in the city, he is flattered by her interest in him and even indulges her initial flirtations.

Martha finds Donny's email address and begins bombarding him with sexually-explicit emails. When she becomes more brazen in her flirtation attempts at the pub, Donny begins to distance himself, later telling her that he only sees her as a friend. While out to coffee together, Martha has a sudden and loud outburst, which shocks Donny. Feeling uneasy, he follows her home, but she spots him through her window.

Martha shows up at a comedy competition where Donny is performing. Though Donny initially flubs his routine, the audience laughs when he pokes fun at Martha, and he unexpectedly makes the semifinals of the competition. Later that evening, Donny receives a Facebook friend request from Martha. He Google searches her and sees that she had been previously imprisoned for stalking. Strangely, Donny is flattered to be the newest target of a convicted stalker, especially given her role in his success at the comedy competition. He hesitates before accepting the friend request.

== Production ==
=== Development ===
Director Weronika Tofilska stated that many elements of the series take inspiration from the 1996 film Trainspotting. Director of photography Krzysztof Trojnar stated, "[Weronika and I] were on the same page from the start. Our vision for the look was led by the narrative and the first-person point of view, and we wanted to keep it as subjective as possible."

Series creator and writer Richard Gadd stated he "begged" for Jessica Gunning to be cast as Martha because she "captured her vulnerability" during the audition process. When asked how she came to understand Martha's character, Gunning stated, "I mean, not to give Richard [Gadd] all the credit, but it genuinely was there in the script for me. When I read that final voice message at the end, I just kind of tapped into something that made me kind of understand her and what he meant to her especially. Then I tried to kind of track back along the scenes and just work out ways in which she might be able to inflate or over-imagine or go home and mull over little moments they had together."

=== Filming ===
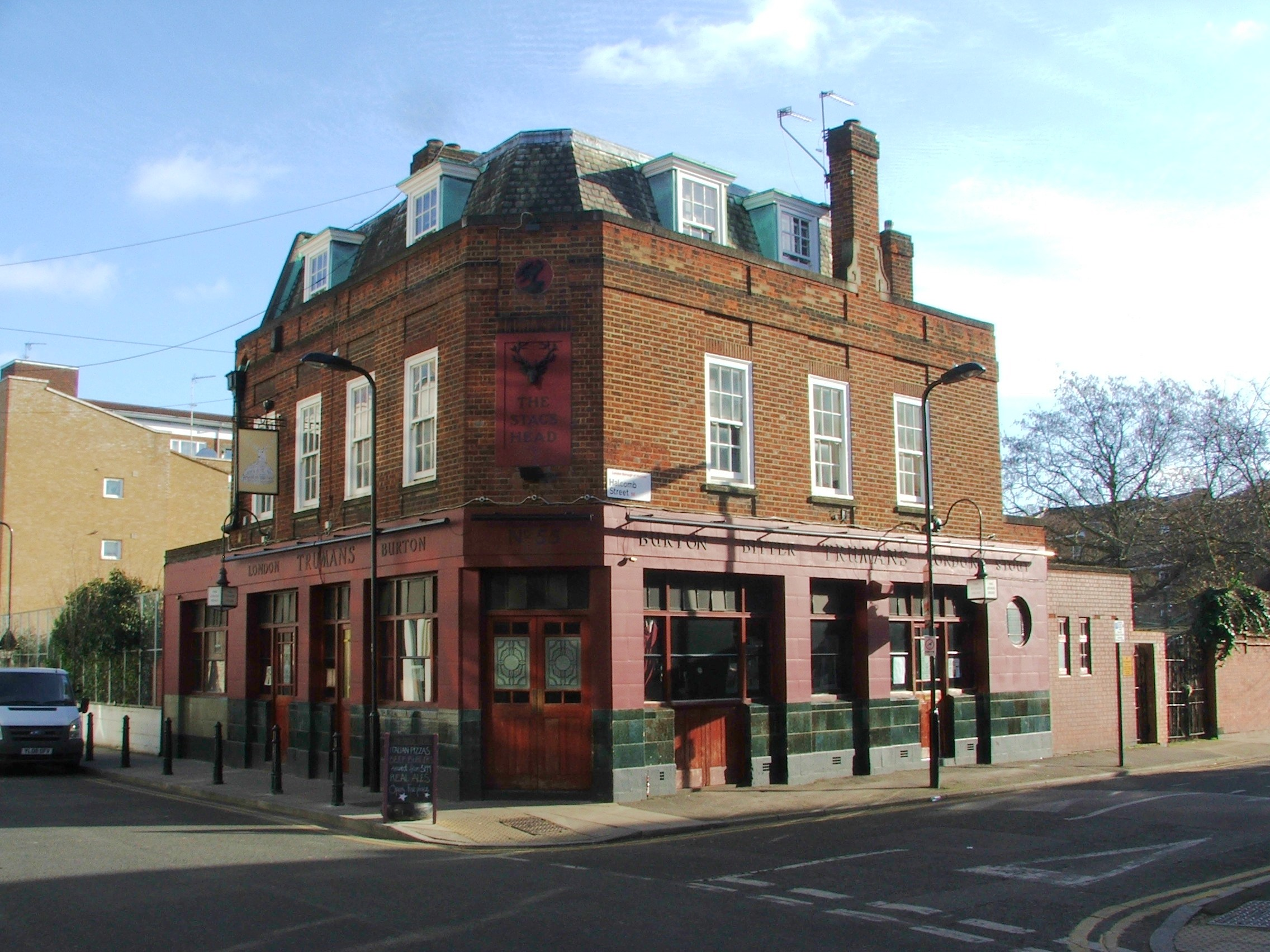
The Stag's Head in Hoxton

The episode was shot on location in London. The pub where Donny works was a set built for the series. Trojnar stated, "We always wanted to do these Steadicam passages and move with [Donny] as he walks behind the counter. When we were scouting pubs, they just didn’t have that photographic perspective on things." The Stag's Head in Hoxton was used as the pub's exterior.

Originally, Gadd was opposed to the use of a spotlight during the comedy show, as it would not be realistic in such a venue. However, Trojnar and Tofilska believed that the spotlight, combined with the tight close-ups on Gadd and "black abyss" over the audience would amplify the discomfort of the performance.

== Reception ==
=== Critical response ===
Marah Eakin of Vulture gave the episode four stars out of five and wrote, "As Baby Reindeer gets further into the episode, it becomes clear that the story is not just about a crazy stalker (thankfully) but also about Donny’s quest for acceptance and recognition."

=== Accolades ===
Award	Year	Category	Nominee	Result	Ref.
Astra TV Awards	2024	Best Directing in a Limited Series or TV Movie	Weronika Tofilska (for "Episode 1")	Nominated	
Golden Reel Awards	2024	Outstanding Achievement in Sound Editing – Music Score and Musical for Episodic Short Form Broadcast Media	Jack Sugden (for "Episode 1")	Nominated	
Primetime Emmy Awards	2024	Outstanding Supporting Actress in a Limited or Anthology Series or Movie	Jessica Gunning (for "Episode 1")	Won	
