= 2025 British Academy Television Awards =

Awards recognising the excellence of British television in 2025

71st British Academy Television Awards
- Date: 11 May 2025
- Site: Royal Festival Hall
- Hosted by: Alan Cumming

Highlights
- Best Comedy Series: Alma's Not Normal
- Best Drama: Blue Lights
- Most awards: Mr Loverman (2)
- Most nominations: Baby Reindeer and Mr Bates vs The Post Office (4)

Television coverage
- Channel: BBC One

The 2025 British Academy Television Awards ceremony was held on 11 May 2025 at the Royal Festival Hall in London, to recognise the excellence in British television of 2024. The ceremony was hosted by Alan Cumming and was broadcast on BBC One.

The nominations were announced on 27 March 2025 alongside the nominations for the 2025 British Academy Television Craft Awards. The nominees for the P&O Cruises Memorable Moment were announced on 11 March 2025. The limited dramas Baby Reindeer and Mr Bates vs The Post Office led the nominations with four each, followed by Mr Loverman, Rivals, Say Nothing, Slow Horses and The Traitors, all with three each.

== Ceremony information ==
=== Category changes ===
The academy announced the creation of two categories for the 2025 edition:

- As with their film counterpart, the television awards have created categories specifically for content designed for audiences aged 16 and under, replacing the British Academy Children's Awards. Therefore, two television categories were created: Children's Scripted and Children's Non-Scripted. The former for scripted drama or comedy content either live-action or animation, and the latter for non-scripted such as factual, factual entertainment, documentary and news.

=== Non-competitive awards ===
The BAFTA Fellowship was presented to Scottish journalist, broadcaster, and presenter Kirsty Wark. In a statement accompanying the announcement, BAFTA CEO Jane Millichip said “I am beyond delighted to present this year’s BAFTA Fellowship to Kirsty Wark. Kirsty’s dedication is unwavering when it comes to telling the stories that really matter. Her legacy is unmatched in the world of news and current affairs broadcasting. Her ability to inform and engage her readers, listeners and viewers is truly inspiring. And she does all this with enormous charm and wit. We are thrilled to celebrate her continued and lasting impact on the industry and beyond.”

ITV was recognized with a Special Award for commissioning Mr Bates vs The Post Office.

== Winners and nominees ==
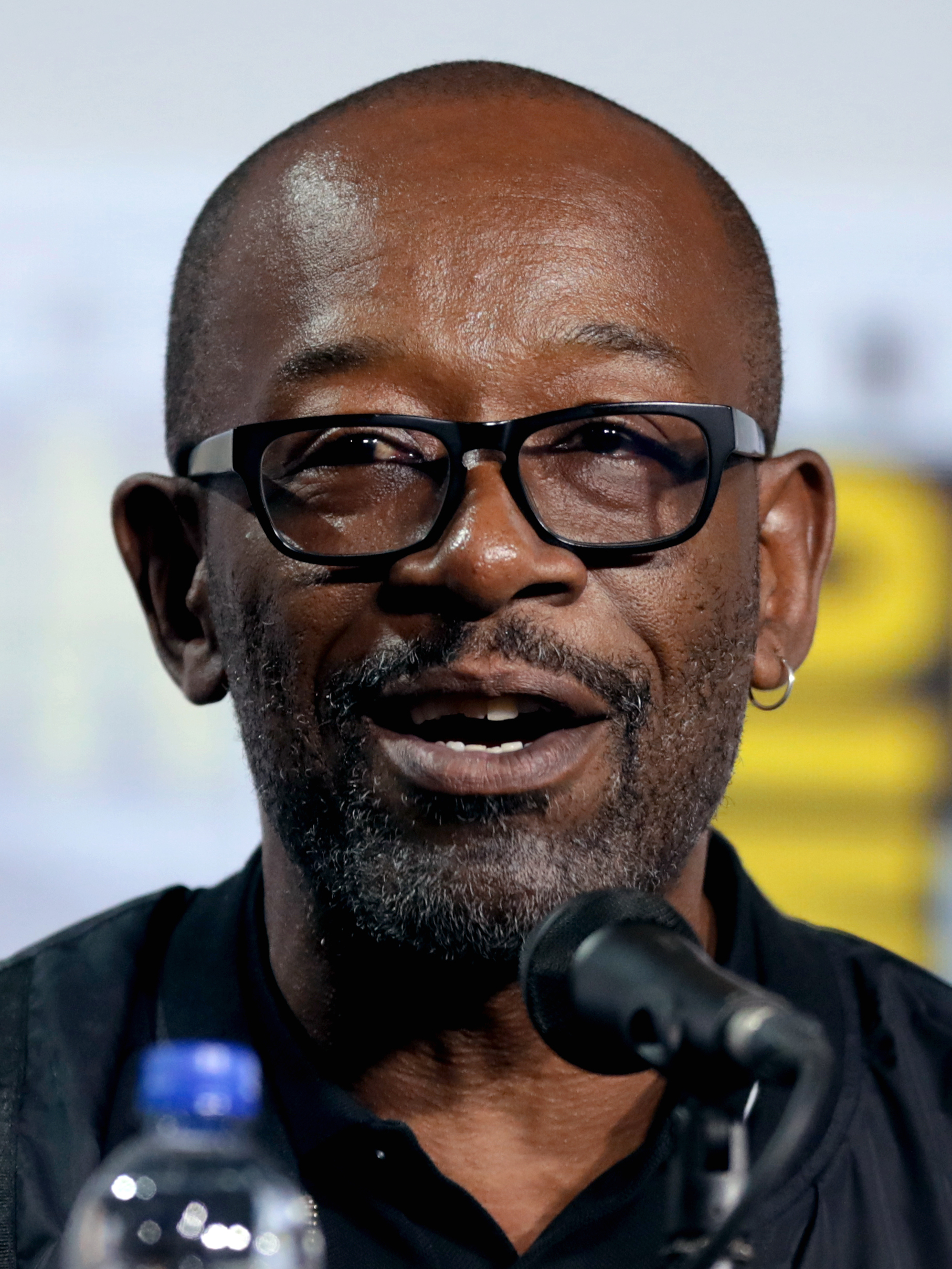
Lennie James, Best Actor winner

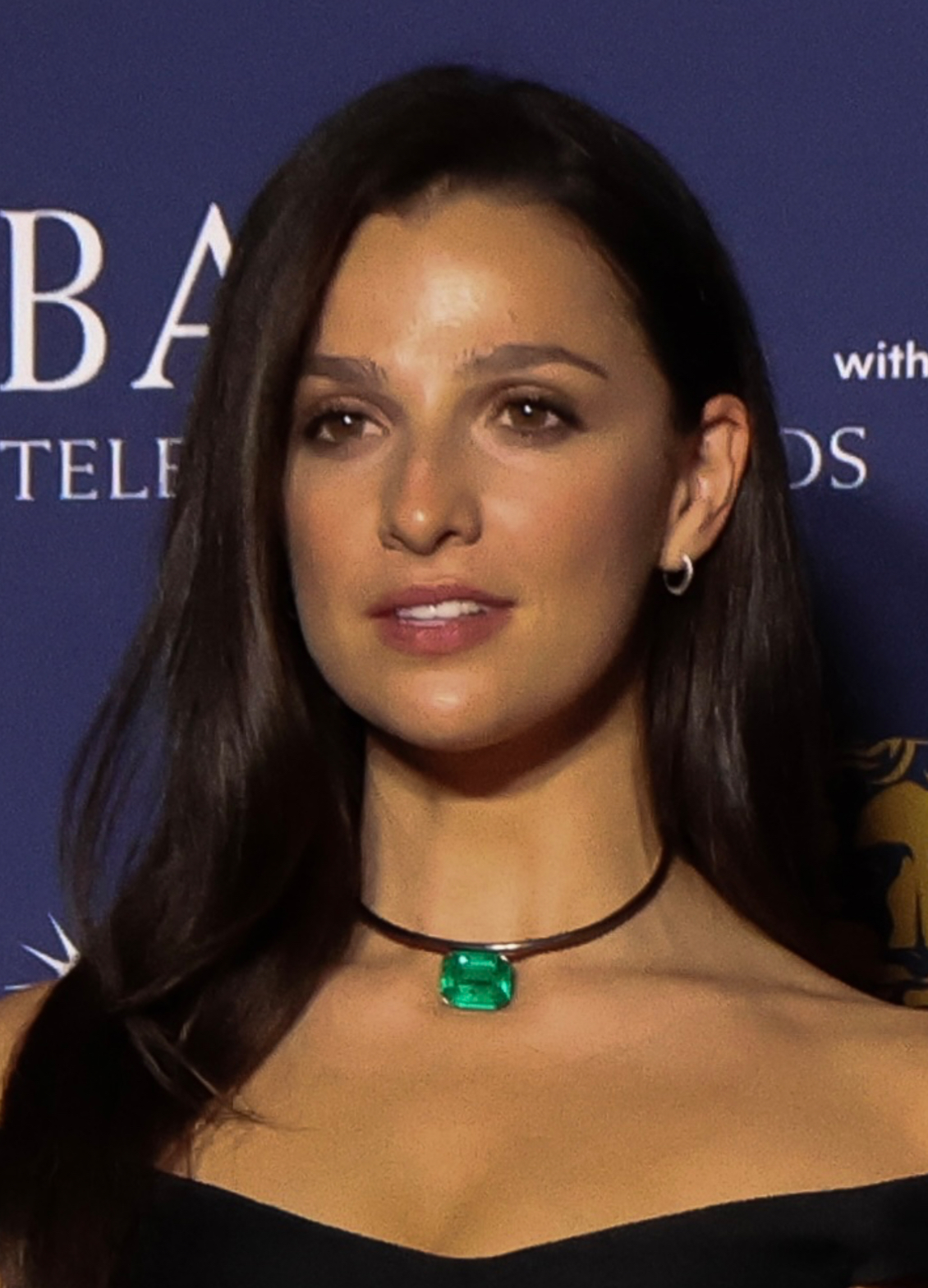
Marisa Abela, Best Actress winner

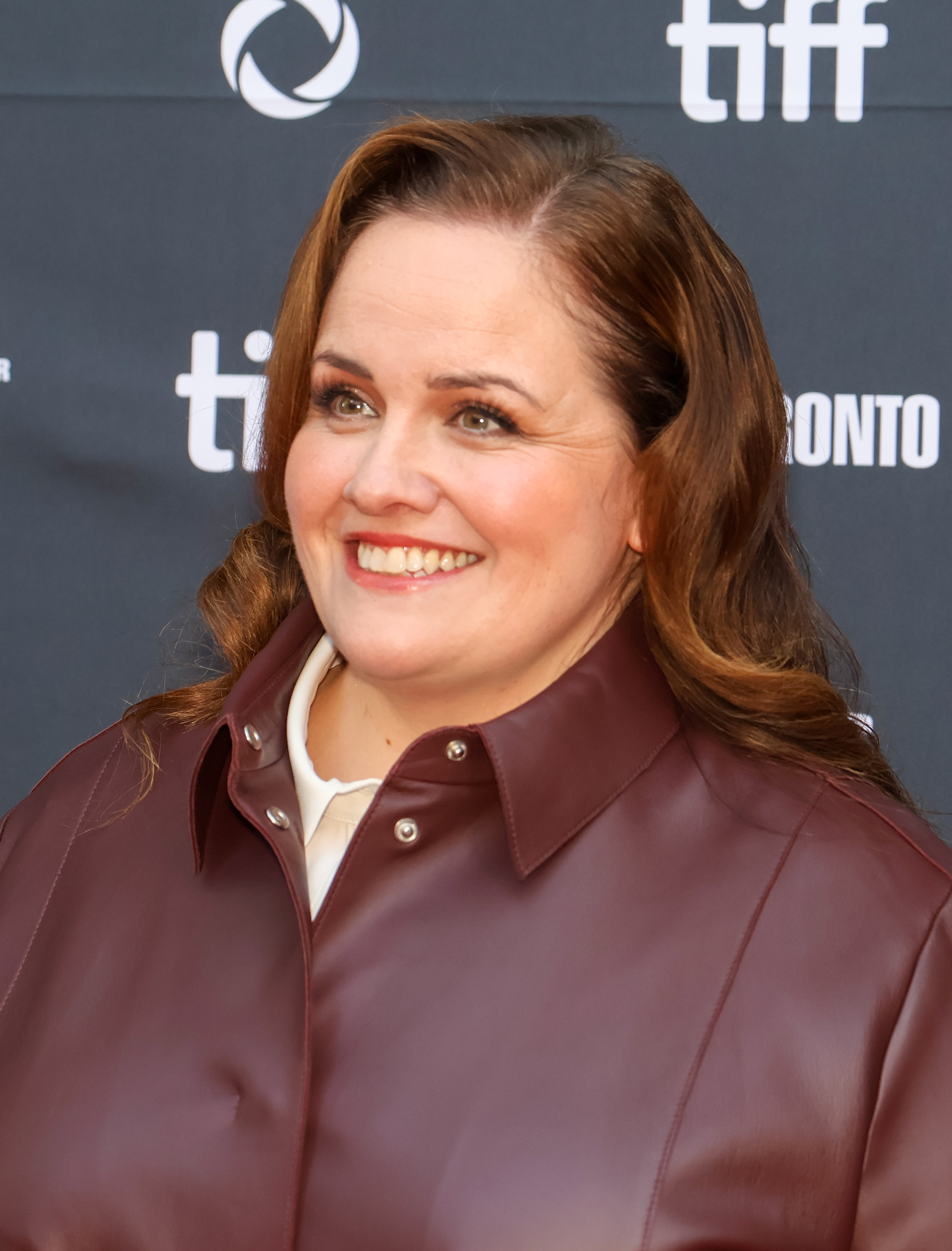
Jessica Gunning, Best Supporting Actress winner

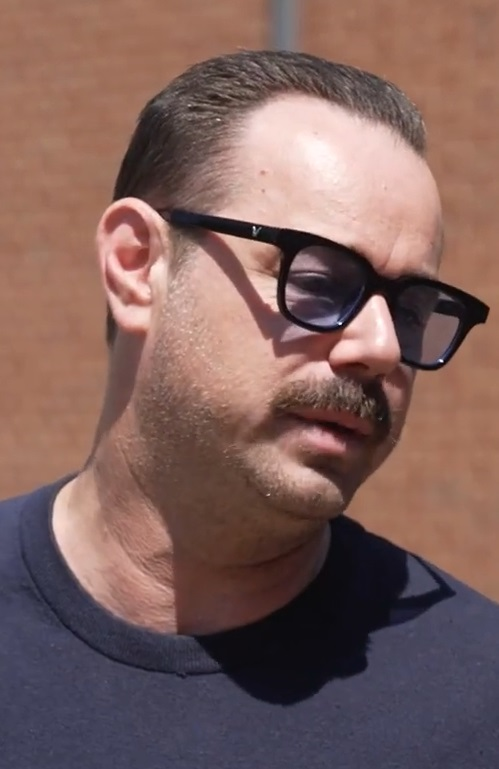
Danny Dyer, Best Male Comedy Performance winner

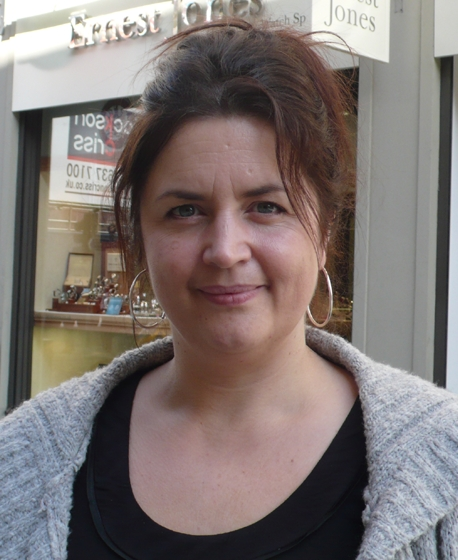
Ruth Jones, Best Female Comedy Performance winner

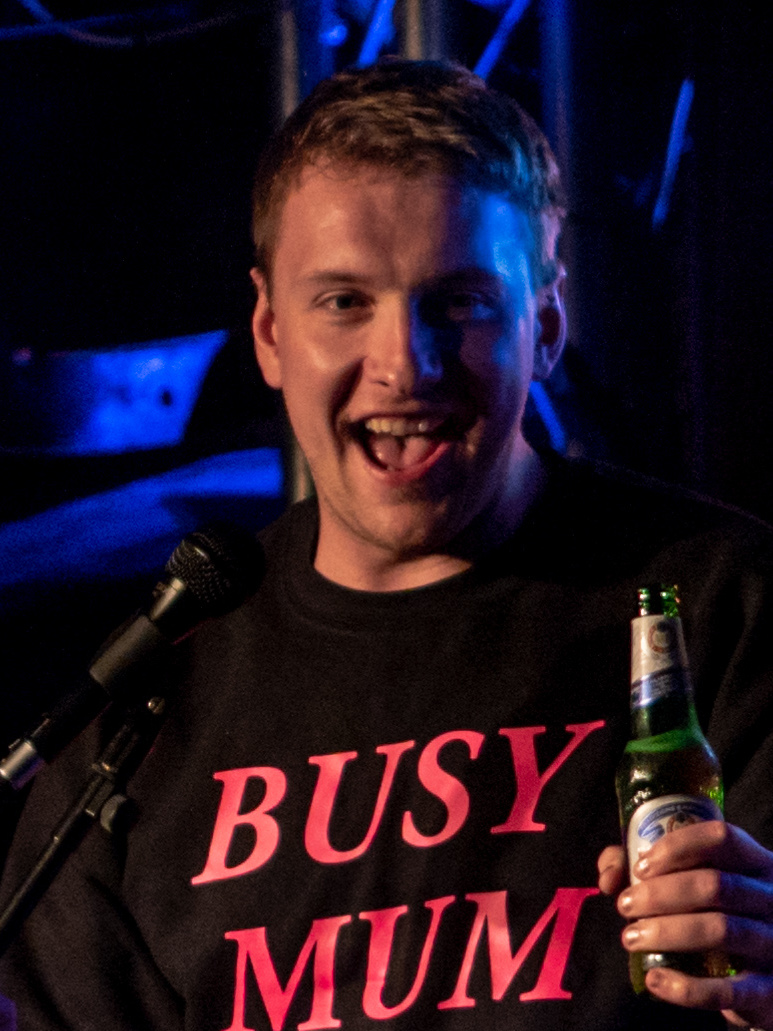
Joe Lycett, Best Entertainment Performance winner

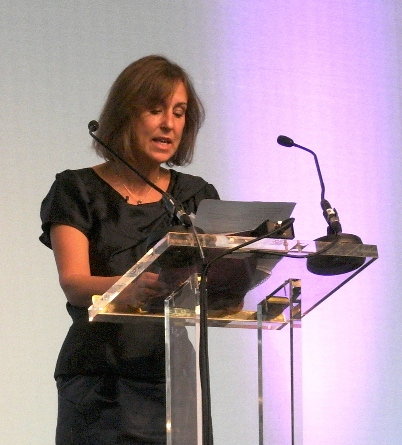
Kirsty Wark, BAFTA Fellowship recipient

The nominations were announced on 27 March 2025.

Best Drama Series	Best Scripted Comedy
Blue Lights (BBC One); Sherwood (BBC One); Supacell (Netflix); Wolf Hall: The Mirror and the Light (BBC One)	Alma's Not Normal (BBC Two); Brassic (Sky Max); G'wed (ITV2); Ludwig (BBC One)
Best Limited Drama	Best Soap
Mr Bates vs The Post Office (ITV1); Baby Reindeer (Netflix); Lost Boys and Fairies (BBC One); One Day (Netflix)	EastEnders (BBC One); Casualty (BBC One); Coronation Street (ITV1)
Best Factual Entertainment	Best International Programme
Rob and Rylan's Grand Tour (BBC Two); In Vogue: The 90s (Disney+); Race across the World (BBC One); Sort Your Life Out (BBC One)	Shōgun (Disney+); After the Party (Channel 4); Colin from Accounts (BBC Two); Say Nothing (Disney+); True Detective: Night Country (Sky Atlantic); You Are Not Alone: Fighting the Wolfpack (Netflix)
Best Actor	Best Actress
Lennie James – Mr Loverman as Barrington Jedidiah "Barry" Walker (BBC One); Martin Freeman – The Responder as PC Chris Carson (BBC One); Richard Gadd – Baby Reindeer as Donny Dunn (Netflix); Toby Jones – Mr Bates vs The Post Office as Alan Bates (ITV1); Gary Oldman – Slow Horses as Jackson Lamb (Apple TV+); David Tennant – Rivals as Lord Tony Baddingham (Disney+)	Marisa Abela – Industry as Yasmin Kara-Hanani (BBC One); Sharon D. Clarke – Mr Loverman as Carmel Walker (BBC One); Monica Dolan – Mr Bates vs The Post Office as Jo Hamilton (ITV1); Anna Maxwell Martin – Until I Kill You as Delia Balmer (ITV1); Lola Petticrew – Say Nothing as Dolours Price (Disney+); Billie Piper – Scoop as Sam McAlister (Netflix)
Best Supporting Actor	Best Supporting Actress
Ariyon Bakare – Mr Loverman as Morris De La Roux (BBC One); McKinley Belcher III – Eric as Michael Ledroit (Netflix); Christopher Chung – Slow Horses as Roddy Ho (Apple TV+); Damian Lewis – Wolf Hall: The Mirror and the Light as Henry VIII (BBC One); Jonathan Pryce – Slow Horses as David Cartwright (Apple TV+); Sonny Walker – The Gathering as Adam (Channel 4)	Jessica Gunning – Baby Reindeer as Martha Scott (Netflix); Monica Dolan – Sherwood as Ann Branson (BBC One); Sue Johnston – Truelove as Marion (Channel 4); Nava Mau – Baby Reindeer as Teresa "Teri" (Netflix); Katherine Parkinson – Rivals as Lizzie Vereker (Disney+); Maxine Peake – Say Nothing as older Dolours Price (Disney+)
Best Male Comedy Performance	Best Female Comedy Performance
Danny Dyer – Mr Bigstuff as Lee (Sky Comedy); Phil Dunning – Smoggie Queens as Dickie (BBC Three); Bilal Hasna – Extraordinary as Kash (Disney+); Nabhaan Rizwan – Kaos as Dionysus (Netflix); Oliver Savell – Changing Ends as Young Alan Carr (ITV1); Dylan Thomas-Smith – G'wed as Reece Duffy (ITV2)	Ruth Jones – Gavin and Stacey: The Finale as Nessa Jenkins (BBC One); Lolly Adefope – The Franchise as Dagmara "Dag" Nwaeze (Sky Comedy); Nicola Coughlan – Big Mood as Maggie (Channel 4); Kate O'Flynn – Everyone Else Burns as Fiona Lewis (Channel 4); Anjana Vasan – We Are Lady Parts as Amina (Channel 4); Sophie Willan – Alma's Not Normal as Alma Nuthall (BBC Two)
Best Entertainment Performance	Best Entertainment Programme
Joe Lycett – Late Night Lycett (Channel 4); Rob Beckett and Romesh Ranganathan – Rob and Romesh Vs (Sky Max); Declan Donnelly and Anthony McPartlin – Ant and Dec's Saturday Night Takeaway (ITV1); Graham Norton – The Graham Norton Show (BBC One); Stacey Solomon – Sort Your Life Out (BBC One); Claudia Winkleman – The Traitors (BBC One)	Would I Lie to You? (BBC One); The 1% Club (ITV1); Michael McIntyre's Big Show (BBC One); Taskmaster (Channel 4)
Best Factual Series	Best Specialist Factual
To Catch a Copper (Channel 4); American Nightmare (Netflix); Freddie Flintoff's Field of Dreams on Tour (BBC One); The Push: Murder on the Cliff (Channel 4)	Atomic People (BBC Two); Billy and Molly: An Otter Love Story (National Geographic); Children of the Cult (ITV1); Miners' Strike 1984: The Battle for Britain (Channel 4)
Best Single Documentary	Best Reality
Ukraine: Enemy in the Woods (BBC Two); Hell Jumper (BBC Two); Tell Them You Love Me (Sky Documentaries); Undercover: Exposing the Far Right (Channel 4)	The Jury: Murder Trial (Channel 4); Dragons' Den (BBC One); Love Is Blind: UK (Netflix); The Traitors (BBC One)
Best Sport Event Coverage	Best Live Event Coverage
Paris 2024 Olympics (BBC One); Euro 2024 (BBC One); Wimbledon 2024 (BBC One)	Glastonbury 2024 (BBC Two); D-Day 80: Tribute to the Fallen (BBC One); Last Night of the Proms (BBC Two)
Best Current Affairs	Best News Coverage
State of Rage (Channel 4); Storyville: "Life and Death in Gaza" (BBC Two); Exposure: "Maternity: Broken Trust" (ITV1); Exposure: "Ukraine's War: The Other Side" (ITV1)	BBC Breakfast: "Post Office Special" (BBC One); Channel 4 News: "Inside Sednaya – The Fall of Assad" (Channel 4); Channel 4 News: "Undercover Inside Reform's Campaign" (Channel 4)
Best Short Form Programme	Best Daytime
Quiet Life (BBC Three); Brown Brit (Channel 4); Peaked (Channel 4); Spud (BBC Three)	Clive Myrie's Caribbean Adventure (BBC Two); Loose Women (ITV1); Morning Live (BBC One); Richard Osman's House of Games (BBC Two)
Best Children's: Scripted	Best Children's: Non-Scripted
CBeebies As You Like It at Shakespeare's Globe (CBeebies); Horrible Histories (CBBC); Ready Eddie Go! (Sky Kids); Tweedy & Fluff (Channel 5)	FYI Investigates: "Disability and Me" (Sky Kids); BooSnoo! (Sky Kids); Operation Ouch! (CBBC); Reu and Harper's Wonder World (Channel 5)
Memorable Moment
Strictly Come Dancing: "Dianne Buswell and Chris McCausland waltz to 'You'll Never Walk Alone'" (BBC One); Bridgerton: "The carriage scene where Colin admits his true feelings for Penelope" (Netflix); Gavin and Stacey: The Finale: "Smithy's Wedding: Mick Stands Up" (BBC One); Mr Bates vs The Post Office: "Jo Hamilton phones the Horizon helpline" (ITV1); Rivals: "Rupert Campbell-Black and Sarah Stratton are caught in a game of naked tennis" (Disney+); The Traitors: "Paul isn't my son... but Ross is!" (BBC One)

== In Memoriam ==
- Janey Godley
- Rochelle Stevens
- Simon Albury
- Harry Manley
- Brian Tesler
- Anthony Adjekum
- Paul Danan
- Henry Kelly
- The Vivienne
- Barbara Leigh-Hunt
- Philip Lowrie
- Diane Langton
- Michelle Trachtenberg
- Bob Newhart
- Shannen Doherty
- Chris Serle
- Tony Soper
- Roberta Taylor
- Brian Murphy
- Tony Slattery
- David Graham
- Jerry Eisenberg
- Alastair Down
- Bill Arthur
- Eddie Jordan
- Cleo Sylvestre
- Lee Montague
- Olivia Hussey
- John Clegg
- Kenneth Cope
- Jean Marsh
- Richard Chamberlain
- Geoffrey Hinsliff
- William Russell
- Nicholas Ball
- Alvin Rakoff
- Tristram Powell
- John Glenister
- Linda Nolan
- Nadia Cattouse
- Michael Mosley
- Timothy West
