= Baby Reindeer =

2024 British television miniseries

- Promotional poster
- Genre: Black comedy; Drama; Psychological thriller
- Created by: Richard Gadd
- Based on: Baby Reindeer by Richard Gadd
- Written by: Richard Gadd
- Directed by: Weronika Tofilska; Josephine Bornebusch
- Starring: Richard Gadd; Jessica Gunning; Nava Mau; Tom Goodman-Hill
- Music by: Evgueni Galperine; Sacha Galperine
- Country of origin: United Kingdom
- Original language: English
- No. of episodes: 7

Production
- Executive producers: Richard Gadd; Wim De Greef; Petra Fried; Matt Jarvis; Ed Macdonald
- Producer: Matthew Mulot
- Production locations: Edinburgh; London
- Running time: 27–45 minutes
- Production company: Clerkenwell Films

Original release
- Network: Netflix
- Release: 11 April 2024

Baby Reindeer is a British black comedy, drama and thriller television miniseries created by and starring Richard Gadd. It is adapted from his autobiographical one-man show. Directed by Weronika Tofilska and Josephine Bornebusch, it also stars Jessica Gunning, Nava Mau and Tom Goodman-Hill. It was released on 11 April 2024 on Netflix, where it had a strong viewership and was critically acclaimed.

Baby Reindeer won six Primetime Emmy Awards, including Outstanding Limited or Anthology Series, Outstanding Writing for Gadd, Outstanding Lead Actor for Gadd, and Outstanding Supporting Actress for Gunning. It also won two Golden Globes: Best Limited or Anthology Series and Best Supporting Actress for Gunning.

== Premise ==
An aspiring comedian named Donny Dunn works as a bartender at a pub in London. He offers a free cup of tea to a weeping customer, Martha, to cheer her up. Martha develops an attachment to Donny and begins to stalk him both in person and online. As Donny attempts to further his career in comedy, the stalking begins to affect every aspect of his life, forcing him to understand his own behaviour, confront his sexuality, and come to terms with the trauma of a past sexual assault. As he attempts to escape Martha's stalking, the mix of fear, sympathy and revulsion he feels for his stalker threatens to ruin his life.

== Cast and characters ==
Lead cast of Baby Reindeer

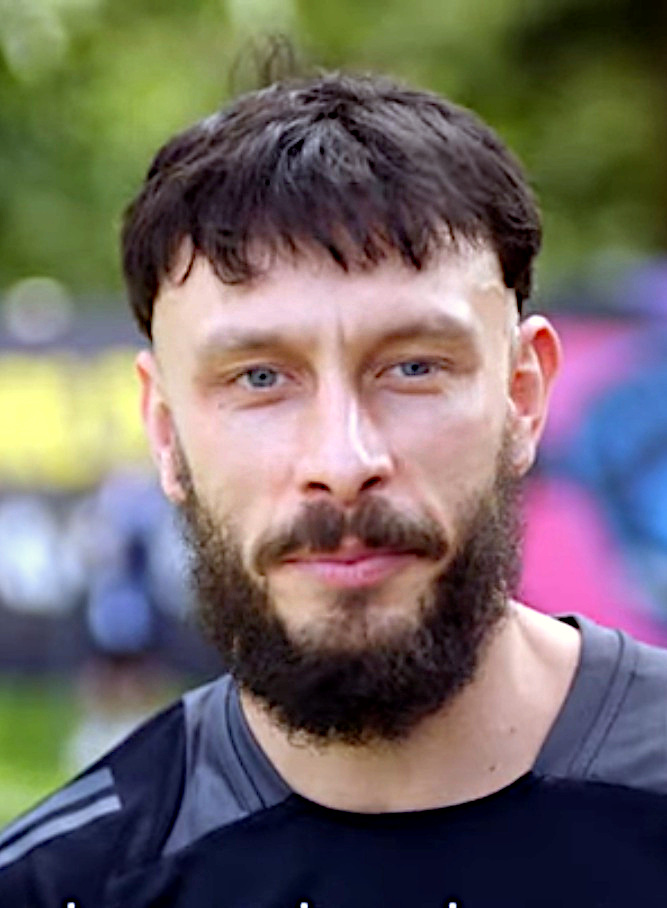
Richard Gadd plays Donny Dunn

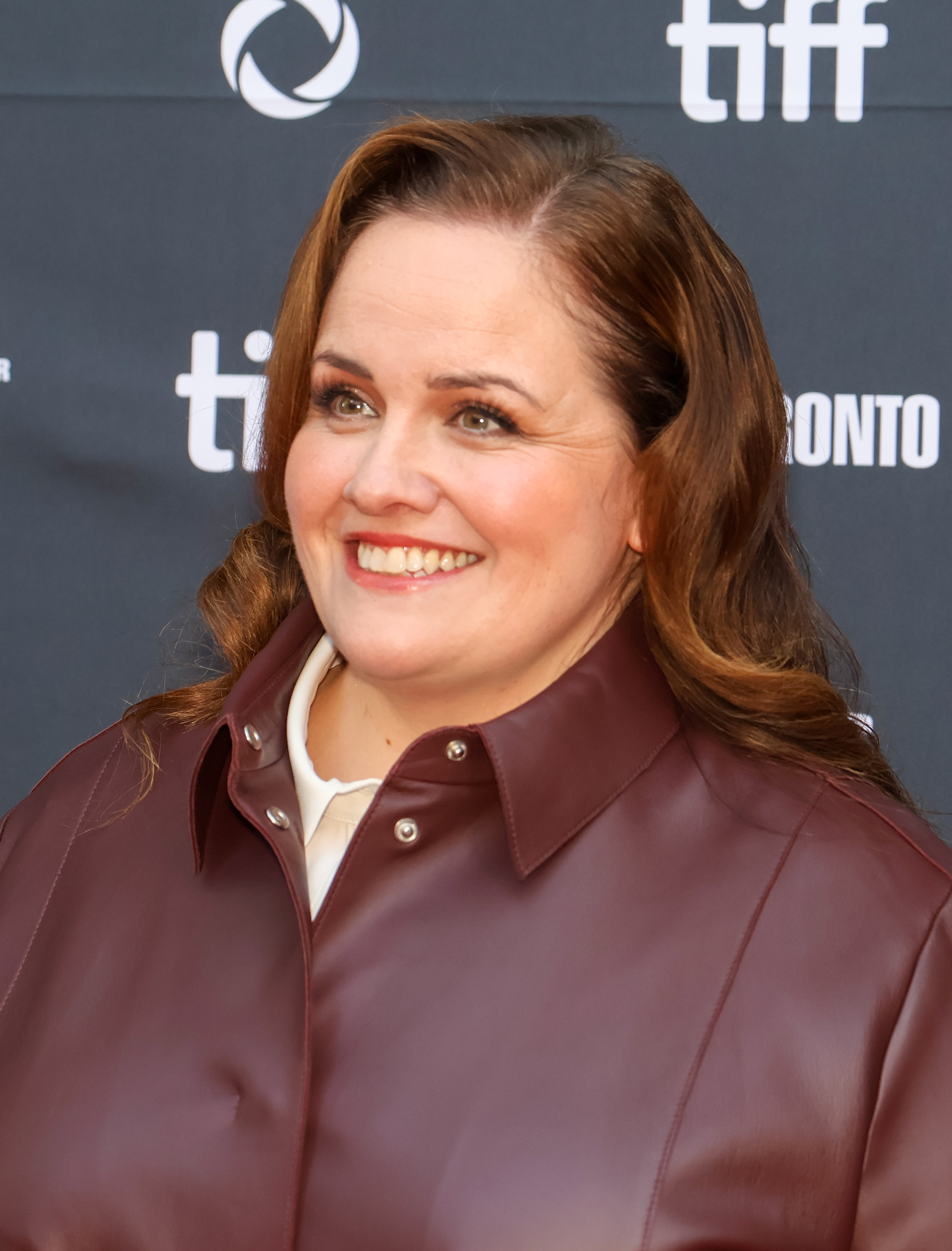
Jessica Gunning plays Martha Scott

=== Main ===
- Richard Gadd as Donny Dunn, an aspiring comedian who works as a bartender
- Jessica Gunning as Martha Scott, a former lawyer with a criminal past
- Nava Mau as Teresa "Teri", a transgender American therapist Donny meets on a dating website
- Tom Goodman-Hill as Darrien O'Connor, a television writer

=== Recurring ===
- Nina Sosanya as Liz, Keeley's mother and Donny's landlady
- Michael Wildman as Greggsy, owner of the pub Donny works in
- Danny Kirrane as Gino, Donny's co-worker
- Thomas Coombes as Officer Daniels, an incompetent police officer
- Shalom Brune-Franklin as Keeley, Donny's ex-girlfriend

=== Guest ===
- Tom Durant Pritchard as Jason, host of a comedy competition
- Laura Smyth as Glenda, master of ceremonies of the comedy competition
- Will Hislop as Billy, a fellow comedian
- Amanda Root as Elle Dunn, Donny's mother
- Mark Lewis Jones as Gerry Dunn, Donny's father
- Hugh Coles as Francis, Donny's friend from drama school
- Josh Finan as Diggsy, a new employee at the pub
- Alexandria Riley as Detective Culver, the detective assigned to Donny's case

== Episodes ==
All seven episodes were released simultaneously on Netflix on 11 April 2024.

No.	Title	Directed by	Written by	Original release date
1	"Episode 1"	Weronika Tofilska	Richard Gadd	11 April 2024
In 2015, while working at a pub in London, struggling comedian Donny Dunn gives a free cup of tea to a distraught customer. The customer, a middle-aged woman named Martha Scott, becomes a regular, claiming that she is a wealthy lawyer and entertaining Donny with stories. She becomes increasingly flirtatious, calling him "baby reindeer" and other pet names. She begins emailing him 80 times a day, making him uncomfortable. He reluctantly takes her for coffee but is disturbed when she has a public outburst. He follows her home, discovers that she lives in a severely cluttered flat on a council estate, and flees after she notices him. Martha views this as a development in their relationship. She arrives uninvited to Donny's performance at a local comedy competition, and her interruptions help him secure a position in the semi-finals. She confesses her love to Donny, has another outburst when he tries to reject her politely and sends him a friend request on Facebook. Upon research, Donny discovers that Martha is a convicted stalker, but nevertheless accepts her friend request.
2	"Episode 2"	Weronika Tofilska	Richard Gadd	11 April 2024
Donny has secretly been dating Teri, a transgender American therapist. Despite seeking a trans partner, Donny is ashamed of his feelings and has told Teri he is a builder named Tony. Martha's stalking intensifies; she leaves comments on every photo on Donny's Facebook profile and jealously sends harassing messages to his ex-girlfriend Keeley, whose mother, Liz, is Donny's landlady. Martha also begins to follow him home after his shifts at the pub. Teri encourages Donny to consult the police, but he refuses, believing Martha is harmless. He attempts to convince his co-workers to ban her from the pub, but one of them jokingly sends her a reply from Donny's account asking for anal sex, causing her to believe that he returns her feelings. Donny has a successful date with Teri while intoxicated on cocaine, but when Teri tells him to kiss her in public, he panics and abandons her on the Underground. As he walks home, Martha follows him, pushes him against a wall and gropes his crotch.
3	"Episode 3"	Weronika Tofilska	Richard Gadd	11 April 2024
Donny confesses his actions and real identity to Teri, who then angrily tells him to leave. Martha befriends Liz under a false identity, leaving a scantily-clad photo of herself in Donny's bedroom. Donny threatens her with the police and she disappears from his home and job, only to appear as a permanent fixture at a bus stop across from his home. Donny becomes sympathetic to Martha as she lapses into a fugue state and takes her back to her home, but tells her to leave him alone, framing it as a breakup in an attempt to give her closure. Martha's contact with Donny briefly ceases. Teri attends the comedy semi-finals, interested in giving Donny a second chance, but his performance is interrupted when Martha begins heckling him from the audience, escalating into a violent rage when he mocks her from the stage. She is thrown out but later attempts to break into Donny's dressing room before pursuing him and Teri. Donny and Teri agree to resume their relationship but their date is interrupted when an enraged Martha spews a barrage of xenophobic and transphobic insults at Teri and then assaults her by tearing out a clump of her hair.
4	"Episode 4"	Weronika Tofilska	Richard Gadd	11 April 2024
Six months later, Donny attempts to report Martha to the police. When the officer asks him why it took him so long to report her, he flashes back to a few years prior. As a young comedian in Edinburgh, he has a chance encounter with Darrien, the writer of a successful television show, who has worked with Donny's comedy idols. Darrien mentors him and encourages him to move to London before suddenly disappearing from his life. Donny moves to Oxford and attends drama school, where he meets and moves in with Keeley. He receives a call from Darrien and begins writing a television pilot under his guidance. Unaware that Darrien is grooming him, Donny regularly spends weekend-long "working sessions" at Darrien's flat. Darrien encourages Donny to do drugs and sexually assaults him while he is high. Eventually, Darrien rapes Donny while he is under the influence of LSD and GHB. Donny finally leaves Darrien, but his relationship with Keeley deteriorates. Confused and angry, Donny subjects himself to reckless sexual encounters with multiple partners of all genders. In the present, due to his guilt over Darrien's assault and never reporting him, Donny fails to give the police an accurate report of Martha's stalking.
5	"Episode 5"	Josephine Bornebusch	Richard Gadd	11 April 2024
Martha is banned from the pub after causing a scene while Donny works. After she assaults Keeley in the street by throwing coke in her face, Liz asks Donny to move out. He moves into a flat with friends from the drama school but is dismayed to learn that they now spend every night throwing drug-fuelled parties. He spends increasing time with Teri, hiding in her flat and coming out to her as bisexual for the first time. Their relationship begins to suffer due to her trauma from Martha's attack and Donny's inability to maintain an erection, caused by his trauma from Martha and Darrien, frustrating Teri. She convinces him to report Martha again and at the station, he finally gets an officer to look her up. After realising that she has prior convictions, the police finally take the case seriously. Martha complies with the police and ceases contact with Donny. However, he finds himself obsessing over her, masturbating to the scantily-clad photo of her and imagining himself having sex with her. This helps him successfully have sex with Teri and their relationship improves. Later on, Donny receives a frantic voicemail from his parents, them having been told by Martha that he is in a hospital after an accident.
6	"Episode 6"	Josephine Bornebusch	Richard Gadd	11 April 2024
Donny is horrified to realise that Martha has begun harassing his parents and has accused his father of being a paedophile, getting him in trouble at his job. After the police are unhelpful, Donny tries to entrap Martha into violating no-contact. However, at the station, he learns that Martha has been recording all of their interactions and the police caution him. As a result, Teri dumps him. The day before Donny is set to perform in the comedy competition finals, Martha returns to the pub and mocks him to a customer. When Donny brings up her previous stalking charges, she attacks him by smashing a glass into his head and he retaliates by punching her. His co-workers convince Donny not to press charges, which would reveal their mismanagement of the pub, and he complies. At the competition, Donny gives up on his act after a joke does not land well and instead breaks down on stage, confessing to the audience in frank detail his guilt, shame and self-hatred after his rape, stalking and his poor management of his relationship with Teri, before leaving the theatre. The episode is dedicated to the memory of Llewellyn Harrison, who worked as a key grip on Baby Reindeer.
7	"Episode 7"	Josephine Bornebusch	Richard Gadd	11 April 2024
A video of Donny's confession goes viral, significantly boosting his career. Martha finds his phone number and leaves him hundreds of angry voicemails. When she threatens to expose his sexuality to his parents, he travels to Fife, Scotland, and tells them everything. His father reveals that, growing up in the Catholic Church, he was also sexually abused. The police advises Donny to report Martha once she leaves a threatening voicemail; after she eventually leaves a voicemail threatening violence, Donny finally reports her. In court, Martha tearfully pleads guilty to all of her crimes and is sentenced to nine months in prison and five years of probation. In the aftermath, Donny quits comedy and, at Keeley's urging, moves back into Liz's house. Upon finding the screenplay he was writing for Darrien, Donny visits him but fails to confront him. Darrien, having seen Donny's video, offers him a writing job, promising it not to be like before and Donny accepts but has a panic attack afterwards. Stopping at a pub, he listens to a voicemail where Martha explains that she calls him "baby reindeer" because he reminds her of a soft toy she would hug while her parents constantly fought during her childhood. Donny breaks down in tears and orders a drink but realises that he has forgotten his wallet. Sympathetic, the barman gives Donny the drink for free, mirroring his first encounter with Martha.

== Original play ==
The original play premiered at the Edinburgh Festival Fringe in 2019 and transferred to the Bush Theatre later that year. It was directed by Jon Brittain and produced by Francesca Moody. It won a Scotsman Fringe First Award and the Laurence Olivier Award for Outstanding Achievement in an Affiliate Theatre. It was due to transfer to the Ambassadors Theatre in London's West End in April 2020 but the run was cancelled due to Covid-19 lockdowns.

== Production ==
=== Development and casting ===
The series was announced in December 2020, with Richard Gadd set to write the series and star. Clerkenwell Films was set to produce. Weronika Tofilska was added as the director in August 2022, with Josephine Bornebusch announced as an additional director in March 2023. Gadd was cast alongside the series announcement. Jessica Gunning was cast on 26 August 2022. Nava Mau was announced as a cast member in March 2023.

=== Filming ===
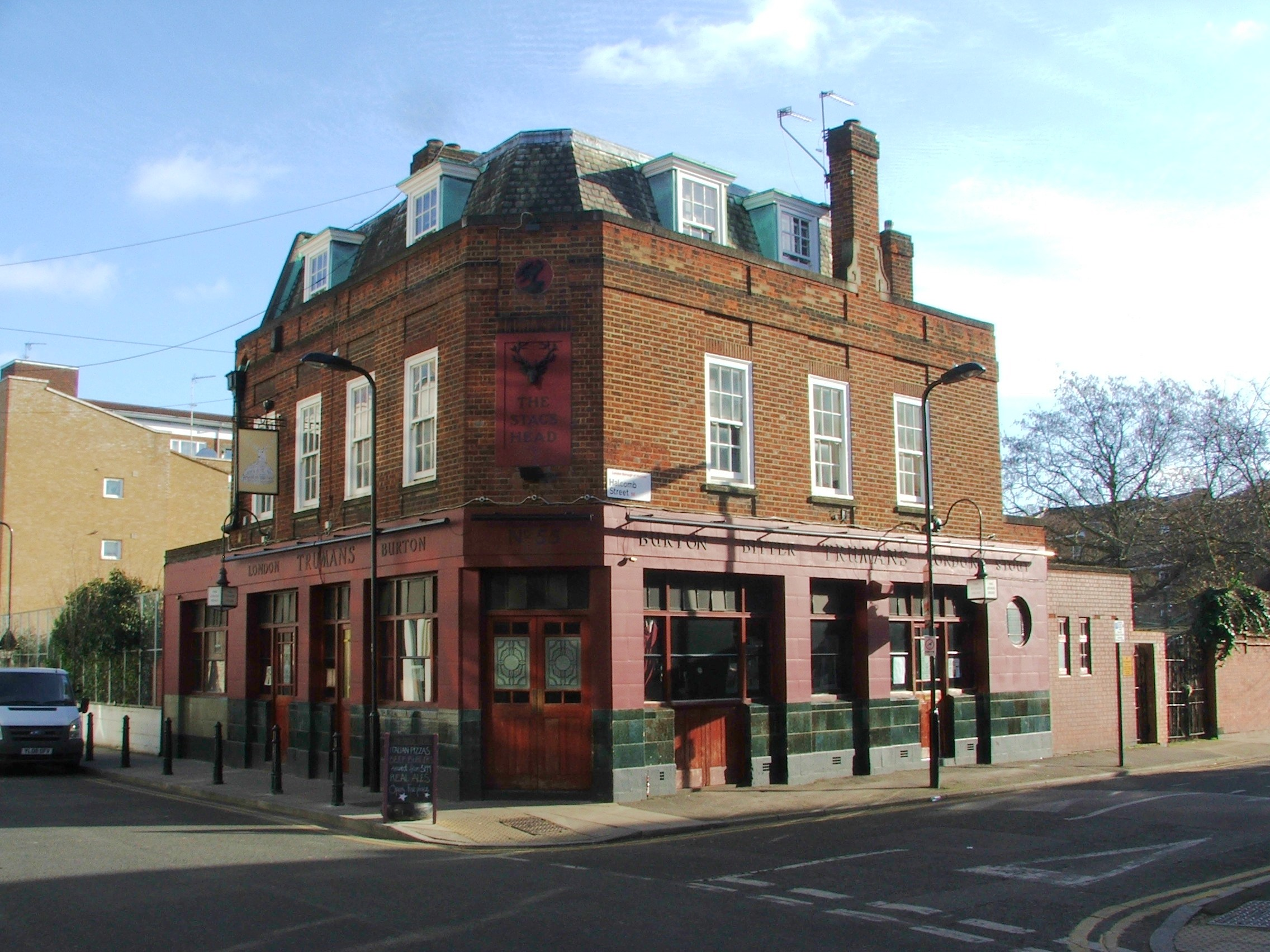
The Stag's Head, Hoxton, served as the exterior of the Heart pub

Filming began in mid-August 2022 in the Grassmarket in Edinburgh, and continued in London in September.

Among the filming locations in London were the Stag's Head pub in Hoxton, which was used for exterior scenes at the Heart pub, the Regent's Canal in Haggerston, and the Royal Vauxhall Tavern. Donny's stand-up comedy shows were filmed at Bethnal Green Working Men's Club, the Rivoli Ballroom in Brockley and The Comedy Store in Leicester Square. Darrien's flat was filmed inside Marsham Court in Victoria, London. In Edinburgh the Hoppy pub in Meadowbank served as the exterior of the Festival Fringe venue for Donny's comedy show (interior scenes were filmed in the Army & Navy pub in Stoke Newington, London). Other exterior locations are the Royal Mile and the Grassmarket, where Donny is shown walking along the street amid festival activities.

Filming wrapped by early March 2023.

== Reception ==
=== Critical response ===
The series was critically acclaimed. (Note: Multiple references:) On the online review aggregator Rotten Tomatoes, 99% of 70 critics gave the series a positive review, with an average rating of 8.7/10. The website's consensus reads: "A bracing work of autofiction by creator and star Richard Gadd, Baby Reindeer can be a punishing watch but richly rewards viewers with its emotional complexity and excellent performances." On Metacritic the series holds a weighted average score of 88 out of 100 based on 18 critics, indicating “universal acclaim”.

=== Audience viewership ===
Baby Reindeer debuted at number five on Netflix's Top 10 TV English titles for the tracking week of 8–14 April 2024, with 10.4 million hours viewed. On the following week, it climbed to number one and garnered 52.8 million viewing hours. The series remained at the same position for its third and fourth weeks, earning 87.4 and 73.6 million viewing hours.

=== Accolades ===
Award	Date of ceremony	Category	Nominee(s)	Result	Ref.
Artios Awards	12 February 2025	Outstanding Achievement in Casting – Limited Series	Nina Gold and Martin Ware	Won	
Astra TV Awards	8 December 2024	Best Limited Series	Baby Reindeer	Won	
Astra TV Awards	8 December 2024	Best Actor in a Limited Series or TV Movie	Richard Gadd	Nominated	
Astra TV Awards	8 December 2024	Best Supporting Actor in a Limited Series or TV Movie	Tom Goodman-Hill	Nominated	
Astra TV Awards	8 December 2024	Best Supporting Actress in a Limited Series or TV Movie	Jessica Gunning	Nominated	
Astra TV Awards	8 December 2024	Best Supporting Actress in a Limited Series or TV Movie	Nava Mau	Nominated	
Astra TV Awards	8 December 2024	Best Directing in a Limited Series or TV Movie	Weronika Tofilska (for "Episode 1")	Nominated	
Astra TV Awards	8 December 2024	Best Writing in a Limited Series or TV Movie	Richard Gadd	Won	
British Academy Television Awards	11 May 2025	Best Limited Drama	Richard Gadd, Weronika Tofilska, Petra Fried, Matt Jarvis, Ed Macdonald, and Matthew Mulot	Nominated	
British Academy Television Awards	11 May 2025	Best Leading Actor	Richard Gadd	Nominated	
British Academy Television Awards	11 May 2025	Best Supporting Actress	Jessica Gunning	Won	
British Academy Television Awards	11 May 2025	Best Supporting Actress	Nava Mau	Nominated	
British Academy Television Craft Awards	27 April 2025	Best Director: Fiction	Weronika Tofilska	Won	
British Academy Television Craft Awards	27 April 2025	Best Writer: Drama	Richard Gadd	Won	
British Academy Television Craft Awards	27 April 2025	Best Editing: Fiction	Peter Oliver and Benjamin Gerstein	Nominated	
British Academy Television Craft Awards	27 April 2025	Best Sound: Fiction	Matthew Skelding, Tom Jenkins, Milos Stojanovic, James Ridgway, and Jack Whitelee	Nominated	
Cinema Audio Society Awards	22 February 2025	Outstanding Achievement in Sound Mixing for Non-Theatrical Motion Pictures or Limited Series	Jake Whitelee, James Ridgway, and Keith Partridge (for "Episode 7")	Nominated	
Costume Designers Guild Awards	6 February 2025	Excellence in Contemporary Television	Mekel Bailey (for "Episode 4")	Nominated	
Critics' Choice Awards	12 January 2025	Best Limited Series	Baby Reindeer	Won	
Critics' Choice Awards	12 January 2025	Best Actor in a Limited Series or Movie Made for Television	Richard Gadd	Nominated	
Critics' Choice Awards	12 January 2025	Best Supporting Actress in a Limited Series or Movie Made for Television	Jessica Gunning	Won	
Golden Globes	5 January 2025	Best Limited or Anthology Series or Television Film	Baby Reindeer	Won	
Golden Globes	5 January 2025	Best Actor – Miniseries or Television Film	Richard Gadd	Nominated	
Golden Globes	5 January 2025	Best Supporting Actress – Series, Miniseries or Television Film	Jessica Gunning	Won	
Golden Reel Awards	23 February 2025	Outstanding Achievement in Sound Editing – Broadcast Short Form	Matt Skelding, Tom Jenkins, Milos Stojanovic, Mathias Schuster, and Barnaby Smyth (for "Episode 7")	Nominated	
Golden Reel Awards	23 February 2025	Outstanding Achievement in Music Editing – Broadcast Short Form	Jack Sugden (for "Episode 1")	Nominated	
Golden Trailer Awards	29 May 2025	Best Comedy Poster for a TV/Streaming Series	Netflix / Netflix Creative Studio (for "Pub Sign")	Nominated	
GLAAD Media Awards	29 March 2025	Outstanding Limited or Anthology Series	Baby Reindeer	Won	
Gotham TV Awards	4 June 2024	Breakthrough Limited Series	Baby Reindeer	Won	
Gotham TV Awards	4 June 2024	Outstanding Performance in a Limited Series	Richard Gadd	Nominated	
Hollywood Music in Media Awards	20 November 2024	Best Music Supervision – Television	Catherine Grieves	Nominated	
Independent Spirit Awards	22 February 2025	Best New Scripted Series	Richard Gadd, Wim De Greef, Petra Fried, Matt Jarvis, and Ed Macdonald	Nominated	
Independent Spirit Awards	22 February 2025	Best Lead Performance in a New Scripted Series	Richard Gadd	Won	
Independent Spirit Awards	22 February 2025	Best Supporting Performance in a New Scripted Series	Nava Mau	Won	
Independent Spirit Awards	22 February 2025	Best Breakthrough Performance in a New Scripted Series	Jessica Gunning	Won	
Peabody Awards	1 May 2025	Entertainment	A Netflix Series / A Clerkenwell Films Production	Won	
Primetime Emmy Awards	15 September 2024	Outstanding Limited or Anthology Series	Richard Gadd, Wim De Greef, Petra Fried, Matt Jarvis, Ed Macdonald, and Matthew Mulot	Won	
Primetime Emmy Awards	15 September 2024	Outstanding Lead Actor in a Limited or Anthology Series or Movie	Richard Gadd	Won	
Primetime Emmy Awards	15 September 2024	Outstanding Supporting Actor in a Limited or Anthology Series or Movie	Tom Goodman-Hill (for "Episode 4")	Nominated	
Primetime Emmy Awards	15 September 2024	Outstanding Supporting Actress in a Limited or Anthology Series or Movie	Jessica Gunning (for "Episode 1")	Won	
Primetime Emmy Awards	15 September 2024	Outstanding Supporting Actress in a Limited or Anthology Series or Movie	Nava Mau (for "Episode 5")	Nominated	
Primetime Emmy Awards	15 September 2024	Outstanding Directing for a Limited or Anthology Series or Movie	Weronika Tofilska (for "Episode 4")	Nominated	
Primetime Emmy Awards	15 September 2024	Outstanding Writing for a Limited or Anthology Series or Movie	Richard Gadd	Won	
Primetime Emmy Awards	8 September 2024	Outstanding Casting for a Limited or Anthology Series or Movie	Nina Gold and Martin Ware	Won	
Primetime Emmy Awards	8 September 2024	Outstanding Contemporary Costumes	Mekel Bailey and Imogen Holness (for "Episode 4")	Nominated	
Primetime Emmy Awards	8 September 2024	Outstanding Music Supervision	Catherine Grieves (for "Episode 4")	Nominated	
Primetime Emmy Awards	8 September 2024	Outstanding Picture Editing for a Limited or Anthology Series or Movie	Peter H. Oliver and Benjamin Gerstein (for "Episode 4")	Won	
Satellite Awards	26 January 2025	Best Miniseries & Limited Series or Motion Picture Made for Television	Baby Reindeer	Nominated	
Satellite Awards	26 January 2025	Best Actor in a Miniseries, Limited Series, or Motion Picture Made for Television	Richard Gadd	Nominated	
Satellite Awards	26 January 2025	Best Actress in a Miniseries, Limited Series, or Motion Picture Made for Television	Jessica Gunning	Nominated	
Satellite Awards	26 January 2025	Best Actress in a Supporting Role in a Series, Miniseries & Limited Series, or Motion Picture Made for Television	Nava Mau	Nominated	
Screen Actors Guild Awards	23 February 2025	Outstanding Performance by a Male Actor in a Miniseries or Television Movie	Richard Gadd	Nominated	
Screen Actors Guild Awards	23 February 2025	Outstanding Performance by a Female Actor in a Miniseries or Television Movie	Jessica Gunning	Won	
Set Decorators Society of America Awards	5 August 2024	Best Achievement in Décor/Design of a Television Movie or Limited Series	Hannah Evans, Lucy Haley, and Debbie Burton	Nominated	
Television Critics Association Awards	12 July 2024	Program of the Year	Baby Reindeer	Nominated	
Television Critics Association Awards	12 July 2024	Outstanding Achievement in Drama	Baby Reindeer	Nominated	
Television Critics Association Awards	12 July 2024	Outstanding Achievement in Movies, Miniseries and Specials	Baby Reindeer	Won	
Television Critics Association Awards	12 July 2024	Outstanding New Program	Baby Reindeer	Nominated	
Television Critics Association Awards	12 July 2024	Individual Achievement in Drama	Richard Gadd	Nominated	

== Source material ==
Fans began to speculate on social media about possible people who inspired the show's fictional characters. In April 2024 Gadd asked fans to cease speculating. After being falsely identified online as the factual person from whom the character Darrien was derived, the theatre director Sean Foley reported the false allegations to the police. The police investigated the reports. Gadd confirmed that Foley was not his source of the character.

On 9 May 2024, in an interview on Piers Morgan Uncensored, 59-year-old Fiona Muir-Harvey, a Scottish woman with a law degree, claimed to have inspired the Martha character. Earlier tweets from a Twitter account linked to Muir-Harvey resulted in increased fan connections between her and the Martha character. These included a reference to hanging curtains, a sexually suggestive phrase that was later used in the script of Baby Reindeer.

During her Uncensored interview, Muir-Harvey said that she had met Gadd several times at The Hawley Arms, Camden, but denied sending him 41,000 emails or going to his home, as was stated of her erstwhile character on the show. She said that she was planning to start legal action for defamation against both Gadd and Netflix for claiming the series is "a true story" and suggesting that she had been convicted of stalking and sexual assault, as is the Martha character in the series.

Muir-Harvey said she had sent up to 10 emails and a letter, as well as several tweets, to Gadd. She later claimed she was paid £250 to appear, and said that the interview left her feeling "a bit used". The interview drew some criticism, with people questioning the ethics of the event.

Laura Wray, a lawyer and widow of the Scottish politician Jimmy Wray, said that she had briefly employed Muir-Harvey at her law firm in 1997. After Muir-Harvey was dismissed, she engaged in stalker-like behaviour towards Wray, forcing her to take out an injunction.

On 6 June 2024 Muir-Harvey filed a lawsuit against Netflix in the United States, alleging defamation, negligence, and gross negligence, seeking $170 million in damages and claiming that the show "viciously destroyed" her. Netflix responded that viewers were unlikely to associate the character with Muir-Harvey. On 27 September US judge R. Gary Klausner dismissed Muir-Harvey's negligence and gross negligence claims, along with her request for punitive damages, but allowed her to continue the defamation case against Netflix. Klausner noted that the series begins by stating that "this is a true story", differentiating it from Gadd's play, which was said to be "based on a true story". He said that Netflix failed to verify Gadd's claims as asserted in the script, and rejected Netflix's defence that the character could not be tied to Muir-Harvey, saying that "they have specific similarities few others could claim to share". A federal judge set a date for court proceedings to begin on 6 May 2025 at the Central District of California court, but this was halted by an appeal lodged by Netflix at the United States Court of Appeals for the Ninth Circuit.
