= 2025 British Academy Television Craft Awards =

Awards ceremony

26th British Academy Television Craft Awards
- Date: 27 April 2025
- Site: The Brewery, London

Highlights
- Most awards: Baby Reindeer, Slow Horses and Rivals (2)
- Most nominations: Baby Reindeer and Rivals (4)

The 26th Annual British Academy Television Craft Awards were held on 27 April 2025, at The Brewery in London, presented by the British Academy of Film and Television Arts (BAFTA) to recognize technical achievements in British television of 2024.

The nominees were announced on 27 March 2025, alongside the nominations for the 2025 British Academy Television Awards. The category for Best Children's Craft Team was added, increasing the number of competitive awards to twenty-three. Baby Reindeer and Rivals led the nominations with four each, followed by Storyville, Slow Horses and Mr Bates vs The Post Office, all with three. The most awarded programmes were Baby Reindeer, Slow Horses and Rivals, all with two craft awards each.

== Winners and nominees ==
The nominees were announced on 27 March 2025.

Best Director: Fiction	Best Director: Factual
Weronika Tofilska – Baby Reindeer (Netflix); Molly Manners – One Day (Netflix); Nida Manzoor – We Are Lady Parts (Channel 4); Peter Kosminsky – Wolf Hall: The Mirror and the Light (BBC One)	Charlie Hamilton-James – Billy & Molly: An Otter Love Story (National Geographic); Natasha Cox – Storyville: "Life and Death in Gaza" (BBC Two); Colette Camden – Lucan (BBC Two); Tom Green, Tommy Forbes – Me and the Voice in My Head (Channel 4)
Best Director: Multi-Camera	Best Scripted Casting
Janet Fraser Crook – Glastonbury 2024 (BBC One); Chris Cook – BBC General Election 2024 (BBC One); Directing Team – D-Day 80: Tribute to the Fallen (BBC One); Nikki Parsons – Strictly Come Dancing (BBC One)	Supacell – Isabella Odoffin (Netflix); Lost Boys and Fairies – Lauren Evans (BBC One); Mr Bates vs The Post Office – Jill Trevellick (ITV1); Rivals – Kelly Valentine Hendry (Disney+)
Best Writer: Comedy	Best Writer: Drama
Reece Shearsmith, Steve Pemberton – Inside No. 9 (BBC Two); Brett Goldstein – Shrinking (Apple TV+); Phil Dunning – Smoggie Queens (BBC Three); Nida Manzoor – We Are Lady Parts (Channel 4)	Richard Gadd – Baby Reindeer (Netflix); Mickey Down, Konrad Kay – Industry (BBC One); Gwyneth Hughes – Mr Bates vs The Post Office (ITV1); Nicole Taylor – One Day (Netflix)
Best Original Music: Fiction	Best Original Music: Factual
Bad Sisters – Tim Phillips, PJ Harvey (Apple TV+); Rivals – Natalie Holt, Jack Halama (Disney+); Slow Horses – Daniel Pemberton, Toydrum (Apple TV+); Until I Kill You – Carly Paradis (ITV1)	Rage Against the Regime: Iran – Noor Khaleghi (BBC Two); American Nightmare – Jessica Jones (Netflix); Exposure: "Israel & Gaza: Into the Abyss" – Tandis Jenhudson (ITV1); Tiger – Nitin Sawhney (Disney+)
Best Entertainment Craft Team	Best Make Up and Hair Design
Taskmaster – Andy Devonshire, Rebecca Bowker, James Dillon, Dru Masters (Channel 4); The Traitors – Ben Archard, James Tinsley, Siggi-Rosen-Rawlings, Mathieu Weekes, Martin Adams, Jimmy Barnett (BBC One); Miracles – Jon Richards, Robert Pound, Tom Elderfield, Darren Sarsby, Peter Turner, Adam Hutchings (Sky Max); Strictly Come Dancing – David Bishop, Joe Phillips, Catherine Land, Jen Townsend, David Arch, Ian Masterson (BBC One)	Rivals – Jill Sweeney, Abi Brotherton, Natalie Allan, Tiffany Pierre, Franziska Roesslhuber, Martine Watkins (Disney+); Bridgerton – Erika Ökvist (Netflix); Joan – Nic Collins (ITV1); Mary & George – Paul Gooch, Adam James Phillips, Julia Vernon, Debbi Salmon (Sky Atlantic)
Best Production Design	Best Costume Design
Rivals – Dominic Hyman (Disney+); Breathtaking – Ashleigh Jeffers (ITV1); Masters of the Air – Chris Seagers (Apple TV+); The Day of the Jackal – Richard Bullock (Sky Atlantic)	Eric – Suzanne Cave (Netflix); Black Doves – Ian Fulcher (Netflix); Mary & George – Annie Symons, Jason Airey (Sky Atlantic); The Tattooist of Auschwitz – Ján Kocman (Sky Atlantic)
Best Children's Craft Team
The Velveteen Rabbit – Tom Bidwell, Jennifer Perrott, Rick Thiele, Sarah Brewerton, Anna Rackard, James Mather (Apple TV+); BooSnoo! – Simon Partington, Alex Copley, Andy Farago, Sandy Nuttgens, Simon Couzens (Sky Kids); Hey Duggee – Grant Orchard, Sander Jones, Ross Phillips, Phillip Warner, Malcolm Mole, Tin Sounds (CBeebies); Horrible Histories – Paul Taylor, Jeremy Hewson, Richie Webb, Lisa Halstead, Jemima Cotter, David Bryan (CBBC)
Best Photography and Lighting: Fiction	Best Photography: Factual
Shōgun – Christopher Ross (Disney+); Eric – Benedict Spence (Netflix); Say Nothing: "I Lay Waiting" – Stephen Murphy (Disney+); Sweetpea – Nick Morris (Sky Atlantic)	State of Rage – Marcel Mettelsiefen (Channel 4); Billy & Molly: An Otter Love Story – Charlie Hamilton James, Johnny Rolt, Bertie Gregory (National Geographic); Storyville: "Life and Death in Gaza" – Camera Team (BBC Two); Silverback – Miles Blayden-Ryall, Vianet Djenguet, Sam Dawe (BBC Two)
Best Sound: Fiction	Best Sound: Factual
Slow Horses – Andrew Sissons, Martin Jensen, Joe Beal, Alex Ellerington, Duncan Price, Abbie Shaw (Apple TV+); House of the Dragon – Alastair Sirkett, Doug Cooper, Simon Bishop, Tim Hands, Adele Fletcher, Barnaby Smyth (Sky Atlantic); True Detective: Night Country – Howard Bargroff, Stephen Griffiths, Tom Jenkins, Andy Shelley, Mark Timms, Michele Woods (Sky Atlantic); Baby Reindeer – Matthew Skelding, Tom Jenkins, Milos Stojanovic, James Ridgway, Jack Whitelee (Netflix)	Secret World of Sound with David Attenborough – Brian Moseley, Angela Groves, Paul Fisher, Chris Watson, Ioannis Spanos (Sky Nature); Apollo 13: Survival – Paul Darling, Greg Gettens, Glen Gathard, Rebecca Heathcote (Netflix); Backstage with the London Philharmonic Orchestra – Kurt Howard, Calum Thomson, Edwin Matthews (Sky Arts); Earthsounds – Sound Team (Apple TV+)
Best Special, Visual and Graphic Effects	Best Titles and Graphic Identity
The Lord of the Rings: The Rings of Power – Jason Smith, Richard Bain, Ryan Conder, Chris Rodgers (Prime Video); House of the Dragon – Dadi Einarsson, Thomas Horton, Lev Kolobov, Mike Dawson, Asa Shoul, Pixomondo (Sky Atlantic); Silo – Daniel Rauchwerger, Raphael Hamm, Stefano Pepin, Richard Stanbury, Ian Fellows, Paul Bongiovanni (Apple TV+); Masters of the Air – Neil Corbould, Caimin Bourne, Stuart Heath, Glen Winchester (Apple TV+)	Sweetpea – Peter Anderson Studio (Sky Atlantic); A Gentleman in Moscow – Matt Curtis (Paramount+); Ludwig – Paul McDonnell, Hugo Moss, Ben Hanbury, Tamsin McGee (BBC One); Paris 2024 Olympics – FX Goby, Paul Bailey, Russell Hendrie, Nina Beyers, Tom Espezel (BBC One)
Best Editing: Fiction	Best Editing: Factual
Slow Horses: "Identity Theft" – Robert Frost (Apple TV+); Baby Reindeer – Peter Oliver, Benjamin Gerstein (Netflix); Mr Bates vs The Post Office – Mike Jones (ITV1); The Day of the Jackal – Luke Dunkley (Sky Atlantic)	Storyville: "Life and Death in Gaza" – Sarah Keeling (BBC Two); Apollo 13: Survival – Otto Burnham (Netflix); Miners' Strike 1984: The Battle for Britain – Sean Mackenzie, Chris Nicholls (Channel 4); Ukraine: Enemy in the Woods – Kate Spankie (BBC Two)
Best Emerging Talent: Fiction	Best Emerging Talent: Factual
Lucia Keskin (Writer) – Things You Should Have Done (BBC Three); Mitch Kalisa (Director) – On the Edge: "Letting Go" (Channel 4); Phil Dunning (Writer) – Smoggie Queens (BBC Three); Kyla Harris, Lee Getty (Writers) – We Might Regret This (BBC Two)	Jaber Badwan (Director of Photography) – Kill Zone: Inside Gaza (Channel 4); Lucy Wells (Shooting Director) – 24 Hours in Police Custody: "Murder on Prescription" (Channel 4); Anna Johnston (Director) – Parole (BBC Two)
Special Award
EastEnders

== See also ==
- 2025 British Academy Television Awards
