= Weronika Tofilska =

Polish director and screenwriter (born 1985)

- Born: 1985 (age 40–41); Katowice, Poland
- Education: Krzysztof Kieślowski Film School; National Film and Television School
- Occupations: Director; screenwriter
- Years active: 2008–present

Weronika Tofilska (Polish pronunciation: [vɛ.rɔˈɲi.ka tɔˈfil.ska]; born 1985) is a Polish director and screenwriter. She is best known for co-writing the romantic thriller film Love Lies Bleeding (2024) and for directing the first four episodes of the Netflix miniseries Baby Reindeer (2024), the latter of which earned her a Primetime Emmy Award nomination.

== Early life ==
Tofilska was born in Katowice. She attended the Karol Szymanowski Academy of Music in Katowice and Emilia Plater High School in Sosnowiec. As a teenager, she volunteered at the New Horizons Film Festival. She bought her first camera, a Sony MiniDV camcorder, after watching Miloš Forman's Amadeus (1984) for the first time. She attended the Krzysztof Kieślowski Film School before later graduating from the National Film and Television School in 2014.

== Career ==
In 2019, Tofilska worked as a second unit director on an episode of Gangs of London. In 2021, she directed two episodes of the crime drama television series The Irregulars. In 2022, she directed one episode of the fantasy drama series His Dark Materials.

In 2024, she co-wrote the romantic thriller film Love Lies Bleeding with Rose Glass, with whom she attended the National Film and Television School. That year, she also directed the first four episodes of the Netflix miniseries Baby Reindeer. For the series' fourth episode, she was nominated for the Primetime Emmy Award for Outstanding Directing for a Limited or Anthology Series or Movie.

== Personal life ==
Since graduating from the National Film and Television School, Tofilska has lived and worked in London.

== Filmography ==
=== Film ===
Year	Title	Director	Writer	Notes	Ref.
2010	Last Train	Yes	Yes	Short film	
2017	Love Life	Yes	Yes	Short film	
2024	Love Lies Bleeding	No	Yes	Co-written with Rose Glass	

=== Television ===
Year	Title	Director	Executive producer	Notes	Ref.
2021	The Irregulars	Yes	No	2 episodes	
2021	Hanna	Yes	No	2 episodes	
2022	His Dark Materials	Yes	No	Episode: "No Way Out"	
2024	Baby Reindeer	Yes	No	4 episodes	
2026	Something Very Bad Is Going to Happen	Yes	Yes	4 episodes	

=== Music videos ===
Year	Title	Artist	Ref.
2015	"Devotion"	Woman's Hour	
2016	"The Cure"	Stevie Parker	

== Awards and nominations ==
Award	Year	Category	Nominated work	Result	Ref.
Astra TV Awards	2024	Best Directing in a Limited Series or TV Movie	Baby Reindeer (for "Episode 1")	Nominated	
British Academy Film Awards	2025	Outstanding British Film	Love Lies Bleeding	Nominated	
British Academy Television Awards	2025	Best Limited Drama	Baby Reindeer	Nominated	
British Academy Television Craft Awards	2025	Best Director: Fiction	Baby Reindeer	Won	
British Independent Film Awards	2024	Best British Independent Film	Love Lies Bleeding	Nominated	
British Independent Film Awards	2024	Best Screenplay	Love Lies Bleeding	Nominated	
Dorian Awards	2025	LGBTQ Screenplay of the Year	Love Lies Bleeding	Nominated	
Primetime Emmy Awards	2024	Outstanding Directing for a Limited or Anthology Series or Movie	Baby Reindeer (for "Episode 4")	Nominated	
San Diego Film Critics Society	2024	Best Original Screenplay	Love Lies Bleeding	Nominated	
