= 27th Costume Designers Guild Awards =

Award ceremony for film and television costuming in 2024

- Date: February 6, 2025
- Location: Ebell of Los Angeles, California
- Country: United States
- Presented by: Costume Designers Guild
- Hosted by: Jackie Tohn

Highlights
- Excellence in Contemporary Film: Conclave – Lisy Christl
- Excellence in Period Film: Nosferatu – Linda Muir
- Excellence in Sci-Fi/Fantasy Film: Wicked – Paul Tazewell

The 27th Costume Designers Guild Awards, honoring excellence in film, television, and short form costume design for 2024, were held on February 6, 2025, at the Ebell of Los Angeles.

The nominations were announced on December 13, 2024. Disney+ miniseries Agatha All Along and the drama series Shōgun led the nominations with three each, with Shōgun reserving two nominations for its costume illustration. The reality singing competition series The Masked Singer also received multiple nominations with two nominations.

== Winners and nominees ==
Winners are listed first and in bold.

=== Film ===
Excellence in Contemporary Film	Excellence in Period Film	Excellence in Sci-Fi/Fantasy Film
**Conclave – Lisy Christl**; Challengers – Jonathan Anderson; Emilia Pérez – Virginie Montel; The Fall Guy - Sarah Evelyn; The Substance – Emmanuelle Youchnovski	**Nosferatu – Linda Muir**; The Book of Clarence – Antoinette Messam; Gladiator II – Janty Yates and Dave Crossman; Maria – Massimo Cantini Parrini; Saturday Night – Danny Glicker	**Wicked – Paul Tazewell**; Beetlejuice Beetlejuice – Colleen Atwood; Borderlands – Daniel Orlandi; Dune: Part Two – Jacqueline West; Furiosa: A Mad Max Saga – Jenny Beavan

=== Television ===
Excellence in Contemporary Television	Excellence in Period Television
**Hacks: "Just for Laughs" – Kathleen Felix-Hager (Max)**; Agatha All Along: "Seekest Thou the Road" – Daniel Selon (Disney+); Baby Reindeer: "Episode 4" – Mekel Bailey (Netflix); Emily in Paris: "The Grey Area" – Marylin Fitoussi (Netflix); The Gentlemen: "Refined Aggression" – Loulou Bontemps (Netflix)	**Shōgun: "Ladies of the Willow World" – Carlos Rosario (FX on Hulu)**; Bridgerton: "Romancing Mister Bridgerton" – John Glaser (Netflix); Feud: Capote vs. the Swans: "Hats, Gloves and Effete Homosexuals" – Lou Eyrich and Rudy Mance (FX); Palm Royale: "Maxine Throws a Party" – Alix Friedberg and Leigh Bell (Apple TV+); Ripley: "IV La Dolce Vita" – Maurizio Millenotti and Gianni Casalnuovo (Netflix)
Excellence in Sci-Fi/Fantasy Television	Excellence in Variety, Reality-Competition, and Live Television
**Dune: Prophecy: "The Hidden Hand" – Bojana Nikitovic (HBO)**; Agatha All Along: "If I Can't Reach You / Let My Song Teach You" – Daniel Selon (Disney+); Fallout: "The Target" – Amy Westcott (Prime Video); House of the Dragon: "The Red Dragon and the Gold" – Caroline McCall (HBO); The Lord of the Rings: The Rings of Power: "Doomed to Die" – Luca Mosca, Katherine Burchill and Libby Dempster (Prime Video)	**The Masked Singer: "Who Can It Be Now?" – Steven Norman Lee and Luke D'Alessandro (Fox)**; The Boulet Brothers' Dragula: "Killer Dolls" – Gioffrè Vincenzo (Shudder); Dancing with the Stars: "Soul Train Night" – Steven Norman Lee and Daniela Gschwendtner (ABC); Saturday Night Live: "Host: Ariana Grande" – Tom Broecker, Ashley Dudek and Cristina Natividad (NBC); We're Here: "Oklahoma, Part 3" – Diego Montoya, Marco Morante, Derek Anthony Purcell and Amber Watkins (HBO)

=== Short Form and Illustration ===
Excellence in Short Form Design	Excellence in Costume Illustration
**Beyoncé – Verizon: "Can't B Broken" – Shiona Turini (commercial)**; Reimagined with Beyoncé: Levis: "Chapter 1: Launderette" – Shiona Turini (commercial); "Dandyland: 102" – Rafaella Rabinovich (web series); "Tick Tick Tick" – Samantha Kuester (short film); Volkswagen: "An American Love Story" – Jenny Eagan (commercial)	**Shōgun (1 of 2) – James Holland (FX on Hulu)**; Agatha All Along – Imogene Chayes (Disney+); Joker: Folie à Deux – Eduardo Lucero; The Masked Singer – Barbra Araujo (Fox); Shōgun (2 of 2) – James Holland (FX on Hulu)

=== Special awards ===
==== Career Achievement Award ====
- Jenny Beavan

==== Distinguished Service Award ====
- Salvador Perez

==== Spotlight Award ====
- Zoe Saldaña

==== Vanguard Spotlight Award ====
- Janelle Monáe

==== Hall of Fame ====
- Van Smith
