= Jessica Gunning =

English actress (born 1986)

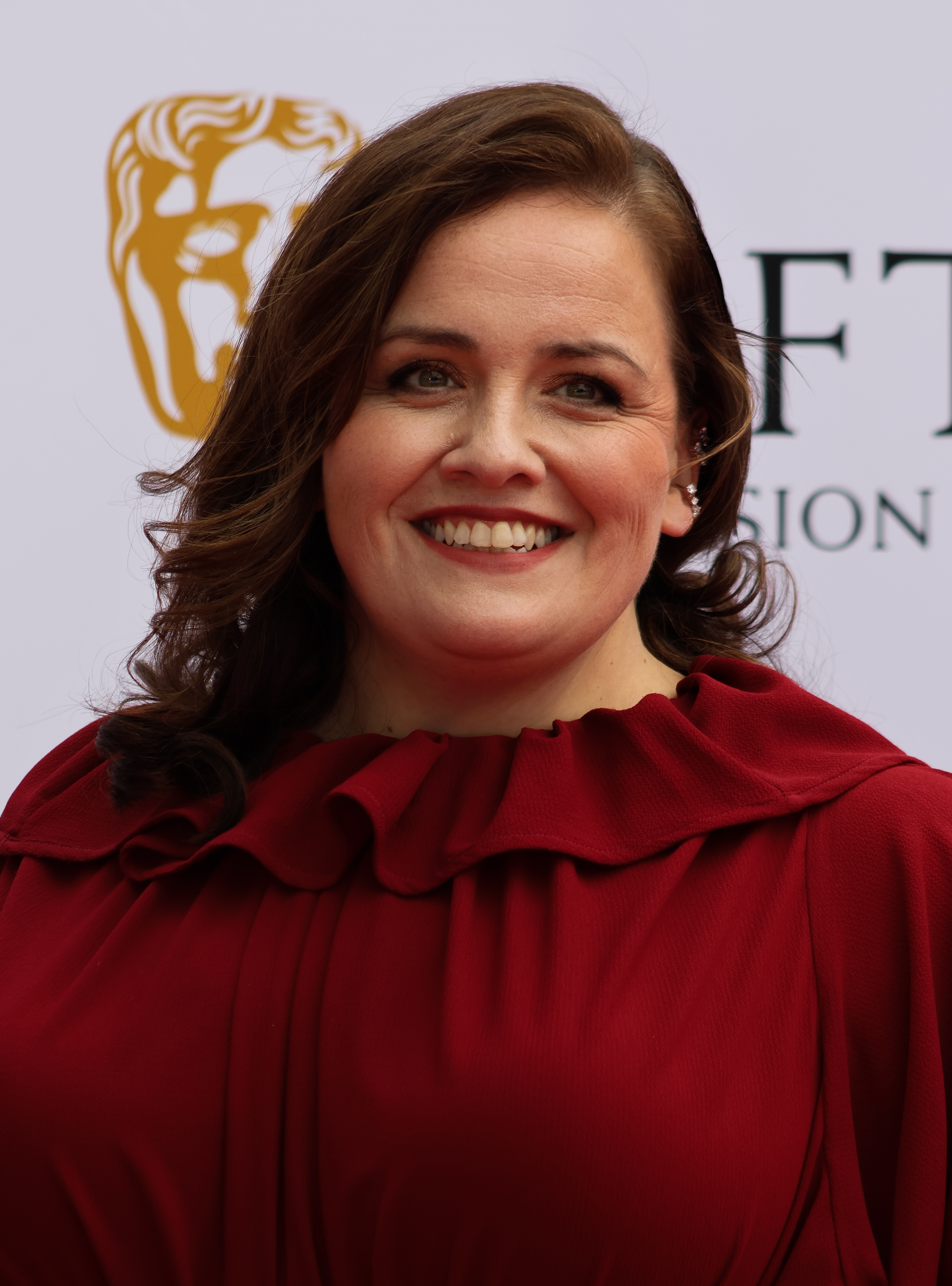
- Gunning in 2026
- Born: Jessica Faye Gunning; 1 January 1986 (age 40); Holmfirth, West Yorkshire, England
- Occupation: Actress
- Years active: 2007–present

Jessica Faye Gunning (born 1 January 1986) is an English actress. She has appeared in the TV series White Heat (2012), What Remains (2013), Back (2017–2021), and The Outlaws (2021–2024). Gunning received widespread critical acclaim for her breakthrough role in the miniseries Baby Reindeer (2024) and won several accolades, including a Primetime Emmy Award, a Golden Globe Award, an Actor Award, a Critics' Choice Award and a British Academy Television Award.

== Early life ==
Jessica Faye Gunning was born on 1 January 1986 in Holmfirth, West Yorkshire. Her parents are Paul and Val Gunning. Her father works for Kirklees council, while her mother was a drama teacher at the school Gunning attended, Holmfirth High School. She has two siblings, Harriet and Josh.

She was educated at Holmfirth High School near Huddersfield, then Greenhead College, Huddersfield before attending Rose Bruford College, graduating in 2007.

== Career ==
Gunning began her stage career at the National Theatre in productions including Much Ado About Nothing and Major Barbara in 2007/2008.

On television, she guest-starred in the 2008 Doctor Who episode "Partners in Crime". She also appeared in Mutual Friends before taking a recurring role as Angela in Law & Order: UK in 2009.

In 2012, she played the character of Orla in the BBC television series White Heat. This was followed by a lead role as Melissa Young in BBC drama What Remains. In 2013, Gunning also played the part of Summer in an episode of Great Night Out for ITV and the following year starred as Siân James in the Golden Globe- and BAFTA-nominated film Pride.

In other television work, Gunning was also seen in The Scandalous Lady W on BBC Two and played Shirley Allerdyce in Sky Atlantic's series Fortitude. She played the character of WPC Kath Morgan in Prime Suspect 1973, DC Sophie Carson in In the Dark and Umm Walid in the Channel 4 drama The State (2017).

In 2019, Gunning performed on stage alongside Cate Blanchett at the National Theatre in When We Have Sufficiently Tortured Each Other, written by Martin Crimp and directed by Katie Mitchell.

Gunning played Jan in the Channel 4 comedy Back, and in 2021 starred as Diane Pemberley in BBC One's The Outlaws, created by Stephen Merchant. Gunning reprised her Outlaws role for series 2 and 3 in 2022 and 2024 respectively, joining the writing team of the show for one episode of the third series.

In 2024, Gunning played Martha Scott in the Netflix drama-thriller Baby Reindeer, which earned her the Primetime Emmy Award for Outstanding Supporting Actress in a Limited or Anthology Series or Movie, and Golden Globe Award for Best Supporting Actress – Series, Miniseries or Television Film .

In 2025, Gunning appeared in Steven Soderbergh’s comedy-drama The Christophers, playing one of the estranged children of artist Julian Sklar (portrayed by Sir Ian McKellen), opposite Michaela Coel and James Corden.

In 2026, Gunning starred as the hot-tempered laundress Dame Washalot in the Enid Blyton fantasy adventure film The Magic Faraway Tree, alongside Andrew Garfield, Claire Foy and Nicola Coughlan.

Gunning is set to star alongside Angelina Jolie in the comedy film Anxious People, directed by Marc Forster, and has joined the cast of Frank and Percy, which also stars Sir Ian McKellen as Percy and Roger Allam as Frank. She will also appear as singer Cass Elliot of the 1960s folk-rock group The Mamas & the Papas in the biographical drama My Mama Cass.

== Personal life ==
Gunning is a lesbian, having first come out to her family and friends in November 2022. She publicly came out in June 2024, describing herself as a "big old gay". Discussing her coming out experience, Gunning said that it was a "mega, mega thing for [her]", adding that although she was "surrounded by gays" and that "all [her] friends are gay" so she "wasn't repressing anything", it was just that she did not think that she could be gay.

== Acting credits ==
=== Film ===
Year	Title	Role	Notes
2012	Ghost in the Machine	Noreen	Short
2014	Pride	Siân James	
2016	Love is Thicker than Water	Emily	
2019	The Mermaid of Mevagissey	Nessa	Short
2020	Summerland	Mrs Bassett	
2025	The Christophers	Sallie Sklar	
2026	Sunny Dancer	Karen	
2026	The Magic Faraway Tree	Dame Washalot	
2026	Frank and Percy †	TBA	Post-production
TBA	Anxious People †	TBA	Post-production

Key
†	Denotes films that have not yet been released

=== Television ===
Year	Title	Role	Notes
2007	It's Adam and Shelley	Scarlet	1 episode
2008	Doctor Who	Stacy Campbell	Episode: "Partners in Crime"
2008	Mutual Friends	Maryka	1 episode
2009–2010	Life of Riley	Annie the babysitter	3 episodes
2009–2014	Law & Order: UK	Angela	29 episodes
2010	Lizzie and Sarah	Branita	TV film
2010	Doctors	Ann Turnbull	Episode: "Daddy's Home"
2011	Holby City	Gwen Bishop	Episode: "Blue Valentine"
2012	White Heat	Orla	6 episodes
2012	Little Crackers	Matron	Episode: "Caroline Quentin's Little Cracker: Nutcracker"
2013	Great Night Out	Summer	1 episode
2013	Common Ground: Adventure Venture	Emma	Episode: "Fergus & Crispin"
2013	Quick Cuts	Annie	3 episodes
2013	What Remains	Melissa Young	4 episodes
2014	That Day We Sang	Pauline	TV film
2015	The Scandalous Lady W	Mary Sotheby	TV film
2015	Top Coppers	Romero	Episode: "The Twist of the French Nicker"
2015, 2018	Fortitude	Shirley Allerdyce	10 episodes
2015, 2024	Inside No. 9	Shona / Party Guest	2 episodes
2016	Jericho	Mabel	5 episodes
2017	Urban Myths	Border Officer	Episode: "Bob Dylan: Knocking on Dave's Door"
2017	Prime Suspect 1973	WPC Kath Morgan	6 episodes
2017	In the Dark	DC Sophia Carson	4 episodes
2017	The State	Umm Walid	4 episodes
2017	What About Barb?	Barb	TV film
2017–2021	Back	Jan	12 episodes
2018	Trollied	Donna Calabrese	7 episodes
2018	Strike: Career of Evil	Holly Brockbank	2 episodes
2018	Tourist Trap	Maxine	1 episode
2019	MotherFatherSon	Pam	3 episodes
2020	Isolation Stories	Stranger	Episode: "Mel"
2021–2024	The Outlaws	Diane Pemberley	17 episodes; also writer of 1 episode
2024	Baby Reindeer	Martha Scott	7 episodes
TBA	Berlin Noir	Bertha Herzner	Upcoming series

=== Audio ===
Year	Title	Role	Notes
2024	The Mysterious Affair at Styles	Evelyn Howard	Audible original

== Awards and nominations ==
Award	Date of ceremony	Category	Nominated work	Result	Ref.
British Academy Television Awards	11 May 2025	Best Supporting Actress	Baby Reindeer	Won	
Primetime Emmy Awards	15 September 2024	Outstanding Supporting Actress in a Limited or Anthology Series or Movie	Baby Reindeer (for "Episode 1")	Won	
Actor Awards	23 February 2025	Outstanding Performance by a Female Actor in a Miniseries or Television Movie	Baby Reindeer	Won	
Golden Globe Awards	5 January 2025	Best Performance by a Female Actor in a Supporting Role on Television	Baby Reindeer	Won	
Critics' Choice Television Awards	7 February 2025	Best Supporting Actress in a Limited Series or Movie Made for Television	Baby Reindeer	Won	
Satellite Awards	26 January 2025	Best Actress in a Miniseries, Limited Series, or Motion Picture Made for Television	Baby Reindeer	Nominated	
Film Independent Spirit Awards	22 February 2025	Best Breakthrough Performance in a New Scripted Series	Baby Reindeer	Won	
Royal Television Society Programme Awards	25 March 2025	Supporting Actor – Female	Baby Reindeer	Won	
Online Film & Television Association	2024	Best Supporting Actress in a Motion Picture, Limited or Anthology Series	Baby Reindeer	2nd Place	
International Online Cinema Awards	2024	Best Supporting Actress in a Limited Series or TV Movie	Baby Reindeer	Won	
Women in Film & TV Awards (UK)	2024	The Argonon Best Performance Award	Baby Reindeer	Won	
Gold Derby Awards	2024	Limited/Movie Supporting Actress	Baby Reindeer	Won	
Dorian Awards	2024	Best Supporting TV Performance – Drama	Baby Reindeer	Nominated	
I Talk Telly Awards	2024	Best Dramatic Performance	Baby Reindeer	Nominated	
Awards Daily Cooler Awards	2024	Outstanding Supporting Actress in a Limited/Anthology Series	Baby Reindeer	Nominated	
"An Irish Person" TV Awards	2024	Outstanding Supporting Actress in a Miniseries or Movie	Baby Reindeer	Nominated	
Astra Television Awards	2024	Best Supporting Actress in a Limited Series or TV Movie	Baby Reindeer	Nominated	
TV Scholar Awards	2024	Best Supporting Acting in a Limited Series	Baby Reindeer	Nominated	
