= Nava Mau =

American actress (born 1992)

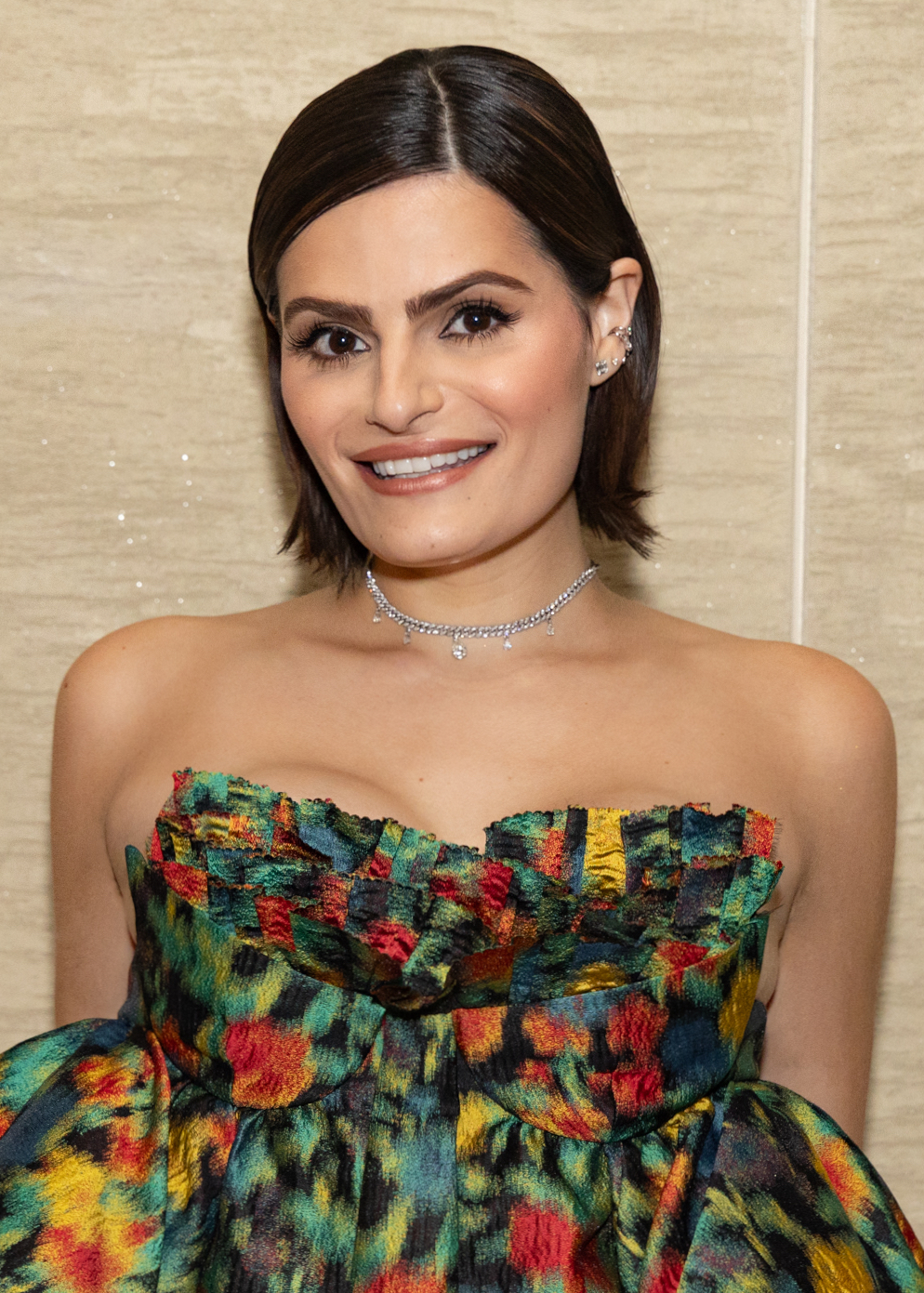
- Mau in 2024
- Born: May 14, 1992 (age 34); Mexico City, Mexico
- Education: Pomona College (BA)
- Occupation: Actress
- Website: navamau.com

Nava Mau (born May 14, 1992) is an American actress and filmmaker, known for appearing in the HBO Max comedy Generation (2021) and the Netflix British dark drama series Baby Reindeer (2024). Her performance in the latter earned her a nomination for a Primetime Emmy Award.

== Early life and education ==
Nava Mau was born in Mexico City, the child of a counsellor and an accountant father. She was raised in Mexico City and San Antonio, Texas, and later moved to Oakland, California, as a young adult. Mau earned a Bachelor of Arts degree in linguistics and cognitive science from Pomona College.

== Career ==
Mau's initial career involved work as a legal assistant with immigrant survivors of violence. She then worked as a peer counselor, in addition to conducting advocacy work for LGBTQ survivors of violence.

In 2019, she was the lead actress, director and producer of Waking Hour. In the film, Mau starred as Sofia, a young transgender woman who meets a potential romantic connection Isaac, a cisgender man, at a party. Mau's character must balance her desire to be intimate with someone and her own sense of personal safety. In 2020, she was selected as a production fellow for the Netflix documentary Disclosure, and worked as a producer on the short film Work, which premiered at Sundance. Mau also produced the short films Sam's Town and Lovebites. In 2021, she starred in the HBO Max series Generation as part of the show's main cast. She played the part of Ana, the aunt of one of the series' main teenage characters.

In 2024, she starred in the Netflix series Baby Reindeer as Teri, the girlfriend of protagonist Donny Dunn. The series, which started as a stage play at the Edinburgh Festival Fringe, had seven episodes and received critical acclaim. Mau received an Emmy nomination for supporting actress in a limited or anthology series or movie, making her the first openly trans woman to be nominated for that category of the Primetime Emmys. On her role as Teri in Baby Reindeer, Mau commented, "It seemed really important to show people that trans women exist in real life and in relationships with real people."

== Personal life ==
Mau is a trans woman and has played transgender characters in most productions she has worked on.

== Awards ==
Mau has been awarded the NewFest Audience Award and the YoSoy Award from the Hispanic Heritage Foundation for her work in film.
