= Stag's Head, Hoxton =

Pub in Hoxton, London

Stag's Head
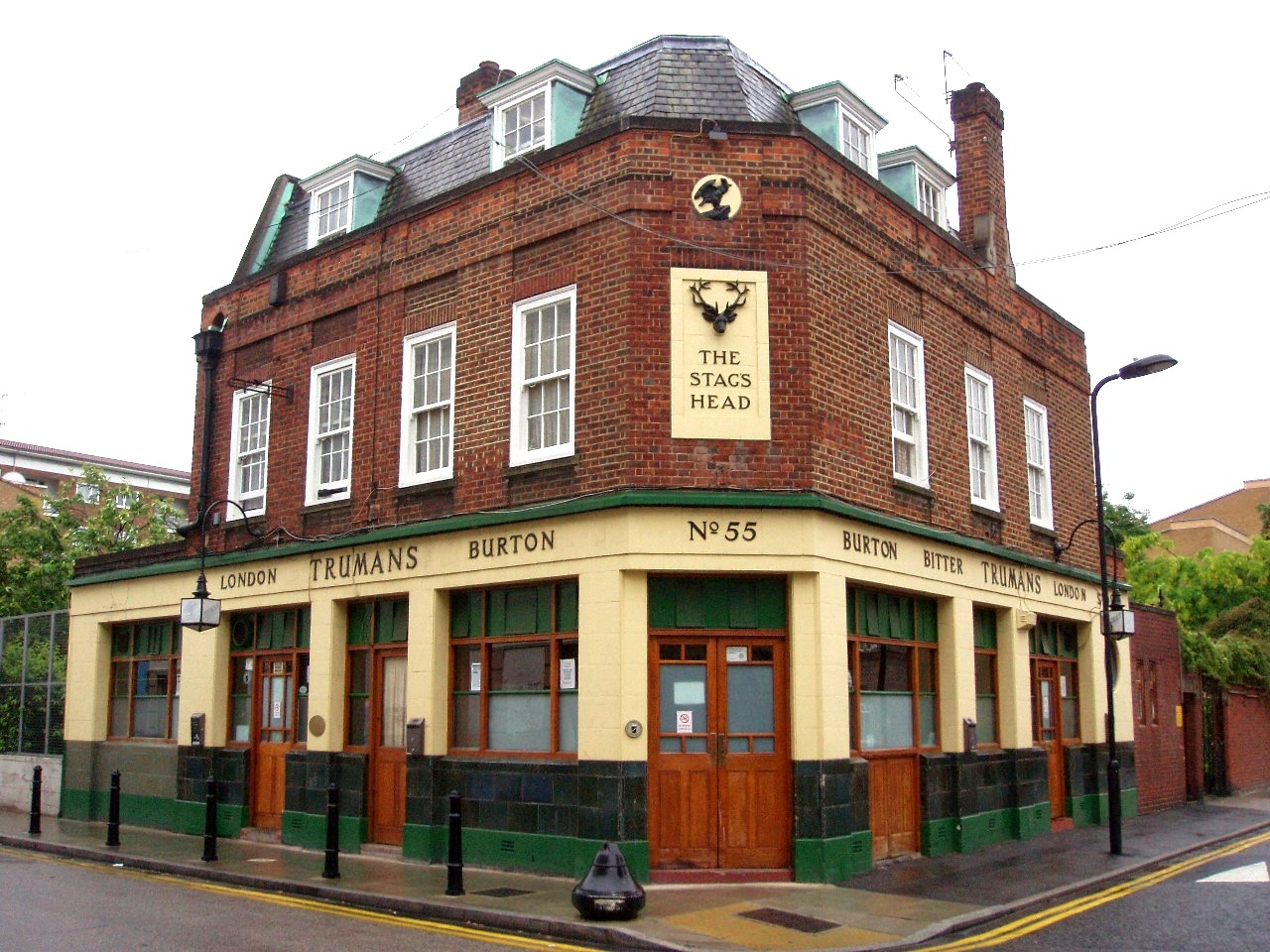
- The Stag's Head, 2008

- Location within London Borough of Hackney Location within Greater London

General information
- Location: 55 Orsman Road, Hoxton, London Borough of Hackney, London, N1 5RA, London, England
- Coordinates: 51.536333°N 0.080785°W

Design and construction
- Designations

Listed Building – Grade II
- Official name: The Stag's Head public house, Hoxton
- Designated: 24 August 2015
- Reference no.: 1427212

The Stag's Head is a Grade II listed public house on Orsman Road, in Hoxton.

It was built in 1936 for Truman's Brewery, and designed by their in-house architect A. E. Sewell.

It was Grade II listed in 2015 by Historic England.

The exterior appeared in the 2024 television miniseries Baby Reindeer.

== See also ==
- List of pubs in London
