= Richard Gadd =

Scottish writer, actor and comedian (born 1989)

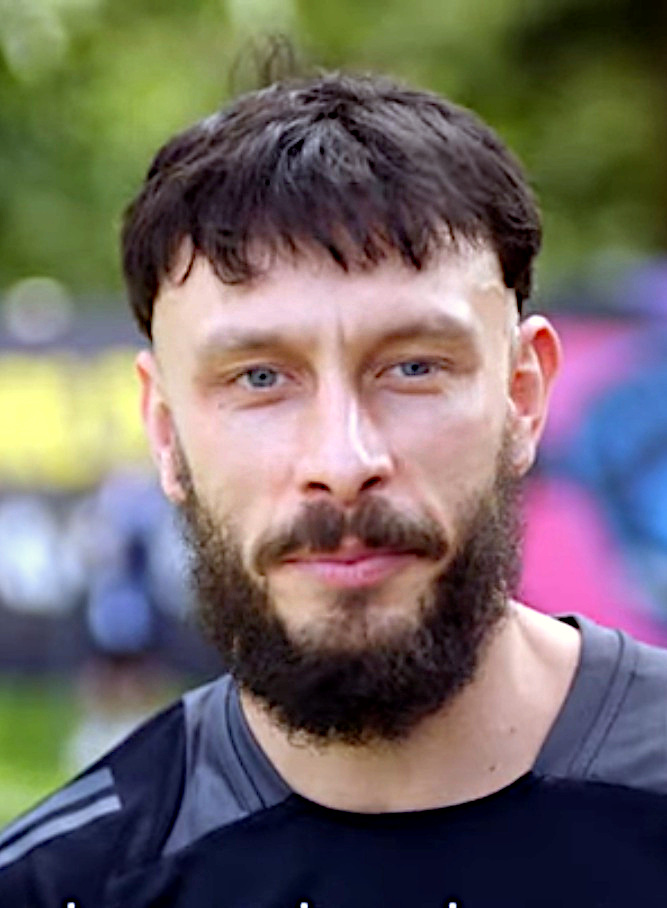
- Richard Gadd in 2025
- Born: 11 May 1989 (age 37); Wormit, Fife, Scotland
- Education: University of Glasgow
- Occupations: Actor; comedian; writer
- Years active: 2008–present
- Notable work: Baby Reindeer
- Father: Geoffrey Michael Gadd
- Website: richardgadd.com

Richard Gadd (born 11 May 1989) is a Scottish actor, comedian, and writer, best known for creating and starring in the 2024 Netflix drama series Baby Reindeer, which was based on his eponymous one-man dark comedy show. Gadd won three Primetime Emmy Awards for writing, producing, and acting in the series. Gadd also won a Peabody Award for the series.

== Early life and education ==
Richard Gadd was born and brought up in the village of Wormit, in the Fife area of Scotland. Gadd has described himself as a "middle-class guy from Fife" and "from a remote part of Scotland”. His father is microbiologist and mycologist Geoffrey Michael Gadd, who is a professor at the University of Dundee.

Gadd went to school at Madras College in nearby St Andrews. There, he had the lead role in a production of Macbeth and was praised for his “wonderfully physical” performance. Gadd then studied English literature and theatre studies at the University of Glasgow, graduating in 2011.

== Career ==
=== Comedy career ===
Gadd began performing stand-up comedy and musical comedy while he was a student at Glasgow University in 2008. He entered the Glasgow heats of the Chortle new comedian awards in 2009. In 2010 Gadd performed his first Edinburgh Fringe show, Richard Gadd: 6 And Half A 7. In 2011, Gadd was a Chortle Student Comedy Awards finalist. In 2012, Gadd co-performed in the Edinburgh Fringe show Gadd, Kirk And Winning – Well, This Is Awkward…, and trained at the Oxford School of Drama, completing a one-year course in 2012. He then moved to London to pursue his comedy career. Gadd's 2013 Edinburgh Fringe show, Cheese & Crack Whores, and his 2014 show, Breaking Gadd, both went on to have runs at London's Soho Theatre. The Guardian wrote that his first two shows "purported to be autobiographical accounts of the young Scotsman's bleak life, a roundelay of failed relationships, blackouts, abusive therapists and fratricide." In 2015, The Guardian called him a "schlock comic with a name for gaudy multimedia tales of drug addiction and sexual violence, mental illness and gore". Gadd's 2015 Edinburgh Fringe show, Waiting for Gaddot, was intentionally more mainstream than its predecessors and gained Gadd more success and wider attention. Waiting for Gaddot won an Amused Moose Comedy Award in 2015 and a Scottish Comedy Award for Best Solo Show in 2016. It was also nominated for a Malcolm Hardee Award for Innovation and a Chortle Award for Innovation.

Gadd's 2016 Fringe show Monkey See Monkey Do won the Edinburgh Comedy Award for Best Comedy Show and was also nominated for a Total Theatre Award for Innovation. Later that year, Gadd won a Chortle Comedian's Comedian Award and was nominated for the 2017 Offie for Best Performer. The show then had several sell-out runs at Soho Theatre, toured the UK and Europe, and had a run at the Melbourne International Comedy Festival, where it was nominated for the 2017 Barry Award. In 2017 it was broadcast as part of Comedy Central's Soho Theatre Live series.

=== Acting and screenwriting ===
As an actor, Gadd had multiple credits in various television series, television films and short films before his breakout success in Baby Reindeer. His acting career began with a role in a 2014 episode of BBC Scotland's Scot Squad and continued in four episodes of E4's Tripped in 2015. He starred opposite Daniel Mays in the 2017 BAFTA-nominated BBC Two single drama Against the Law. Gadd's other acting credits include BBC Three's Clique, Sky Arts's One Normal Night, and Sky One's Code 404. He has also appeared in several short films. Gadd wrote for Netflix's Sex Education and has written episodes of Ultimate Worrier for Dave and The Last Leg for Channel 4. In 2022, Gadd starred as Conrad Lennox in three episodes of the Disney+ series Wedding Season. Several of his projects have aired on BBC Radio 4 and BBC Radio Scotland. Gadd wrote and starred in the drama Half Man that aired on HBO and BBC in 2026 alongside Jamie Bell.

=== Baby Reindeer ===
While a jobbing comedian, Gadd worked as a bartender at The Hawley Arms pub in Camden Town, London. There he met 'Martha', who became the main character in Baby Reindeer. Baby Reindeer began as a 2019 Edinburgh fringe show, a dark comedy chronicling Gadd's experiences of being stalked by 'Martha' and sexually assaulted by a man he met earlier in his career. It was Gadd's breakout success and won two Edinburgh Fringe awards: The Scotsman Fringe First Award for New Writing and a Stage Award for Acting Excellence. The show had a five-week run at London's Bush Theatre, received the Offie for Best Video Design and was nominated for an Offie for Best Performer. The show later transferred to the Ambassador's Theatre in London's West End but was cancelled due to the COVID-19 pandemic. A few months later, the show won the Laurence Olivier Award for Outstanding Achievement in an Affiliate Theatre.

In April 2024, Netflix released a semi-autobiographical seven-episode drama based on Gadd's play and billed as a 'true story'. Gadd lost 28 kilograms to play the fictionalized version of himself in order to feel "vulnerable and fragile". Baby Reindeer also featured a fictionalized version of Gadd's parents. Within a week of its release, Baby Reindeer was the top series on Netflix globally, having garnered more than 52 million viewing hours. The enormous success and popularity of Baby Reindeer resulted in a notable annual increase in spending on Netflix digital subscriptions.

The woman depicted as 'Martha' in Baby Reindeer, portrayed as having stalked and sexually assaulted Gadd, was quickly identified as Fiona Harvey, a Scottish lawyer. Harvey denied Gadd's accusations and depiction of her, said she had never been to jail, as depicted in the Netflix show, and is pursuing a multi-million-pound defamation claim against Netflix. A former colleague has also questioned the version of events in Baby Reindeer. Although not directly named in Harvey's lawsuit against Netflix, Gadd has fully supported Netflix's defence against Harvey's claims and requested to have her suit dismissed, defending the veracity of Baby Reindeer and reiterating accusations made against Harvey for stalking.

=== Half Man ===
Gadd wrote and starred in BBC and HBO six-parter, Half Man, after Baby Reindeer. Like his earlier work, Gadd says the show explores subjects that have affected him personally, including abuse, sexuality, obsession, addiction, and masculinity. He credits making art with helping him understand those experiences. Ruben is not based on a real person. "It’s not based on anyone or drawn from anyone at all," he says. However, Gadd says most people recognize the type of person Ruben represents—a man whose presence inspires a primal sense of fear. Gadd says that the show is about "struggling to love yourself and struggling to love someone else.”

The co-production on Half Man started principal photography in Scotland in February 2025. It wrapped five months later. Gadd put on more than 50 pounds of muscle to play Ruben and has slimmed down only marginally since the shoot ended. He followed a strict, highly regimented training and nutrition program—working with professionals, eating pre-planned meals on a fixed schedule, and maintaining complete discipline—to build a realistic, lived-in physique rather than a stereotypical Hollywood body. Gadd deliberately transformed his voice to make the character feel more intimidating and "animalistic." Wanting to create a stark contrast with the anxious, neurotic Donny Dunn from Baby Reindeer, Gadd spent months doing daily vocal exercises to deepen his register, developing a lower, gruffer, and more abrasive sound. He also incorporated grunts, growls, and a guttural laugh into Ruben's speech, aiming to give the character a primal presence that felt physically imposing. Gadd said the vocal work became a key part of his overall transformation, helping him create a character who seemed to operate on a deeper and more threatening level than those around him.

== Personal life ==
Gadd is bisexual. He explained: "Bisexual is the easiest way of explaining it to people, but even then, I feel like I have a restlessness around sexuality, almost a confusion or an ever-shifting attitude towards it."

He has struggled with alcohol and substance abuse, telling The Guardian in 2015, "I'm healthy and sober now. I still get real bad downers. But I feel better than I was." Gadd is an avid football fan, supporting Dundee United and the Scotland national team. He was spotted at a Euro 2024 match and at the WWE Raw debut on Netflix. In June 2025, Gadd played for the Rest of the World team in the Soccer Aid for UNICEF UK game, which was victorious in defeating England XI 5–4. As of 2015 he lived in London.

Gadd called Trainspotting (1996) his favorite film of all time.

== Filmography ==
=== Film ===
Year	Title	Role	Notes
2027	Porto Rico †		Filming
2027	Rode to Ruin †	Clive McKinney	Filming

=== Television ===
Year	Title	Role	Notes
2014	Scot Squad	Tybalt Camberlain	Season 1, Episode 4
2015	Tripped	Callum	Main role
2016	Vicious	Delivery Man	Episode: "The Finale"
2017	Against the Law	Eddie McNally	Television film
2018	Humans	Protester	Season 3, Episode 4
2018	Clique	Ben Howard	Recurring role; 6 episodes
2019	Urban Myths	Gareth	Episode: "Princess Diana, Freddy and Kenny"
2020	Outlander	Duff	Episode: "Mercy Shall Follow Me"
2020–2022	Code 404	Liam Cleasby	Main role
2022	Wedding Season	Conrad Lennox	Guest role; 3 episodes
2024	A Bear Named Wojtek	Dave	Voice role; television film
2024	Baby Reindeer	Donny Dunn	Lead role; also writer and creator
2026	Half Man	Ruben Pallister	Lead role; also writer and creator
TBA	The Husbands		Upcoming series

== Awards and nominations ==
Year	Award	Category	Work	Result	Ref.
2024	Astra TV Awards	Best Actor in a Limited Series or TV Movie	Baby Reindeer	Nominated	
2024	Astra TV Awards	Best Writing in a Limited Series or TV Movie	Baby Reindeer	Won	
2024	Gotham TV Awards	Outstanding Performance in a Limited Series	Baby Reindeer	Nominated	
2024	Primetime Emmy Awards	Outstanding Limited or Anthology Series	Baby Reindeer	Won	
2024	Primetime Emmy Awards	Outstanding Lead Actor in a Limited or Anthology Series or Movie	Baby Reindeer	Won	
2024	Primetime Emmy Awards	Outstanding Writing for a Limited or Anthology Series or Movie	Baby Reindeer	Won	
2024	Television Critics Association Awards	Individual Achievement in Drama	Baby Reindeer	Nominated	
2025	British Academy Television Awards	Best Limited Drama	Baby Reindeer	Nominated	
2025	British Academy Television Awards	Best Leading Actor	Baby Reindeer	Nominated	
2025	British Academy Television Craft Awards	Best Writer: Drama	Baby Reindeer	Won	
2025	Golden Globe Awards	Best Limited or Anthology Series or Television Film	Baby Reindeer	Won	
2025	Golden Globe Awards	Best Actor – Miniseries or Television Film	Baby Reindeer	Nominated	
2025	Independent Spirit Awards	Best Lead Performance in a New Scripted Series	Baby Reindeer	Won	
2025	Screen Actors Guild Awards	Outstanding Performance by a Male Actor in a Miniseries or Television Movie	Baby Reindeer	Nominated	
2026	Canneseries	Konbini Prix de l'Engagement	Himself	Honoured	
2026	Primetime Emmy Awards	Outstanding Supporting Actor in a Limited or Anthology Series or Movie	Half Man	Nominated	

== See also ==
- List of comedians
- List of Edinburgh Comedy Award winners
- List of University of Glasgow people
