= The Hawley Arms, Camden =

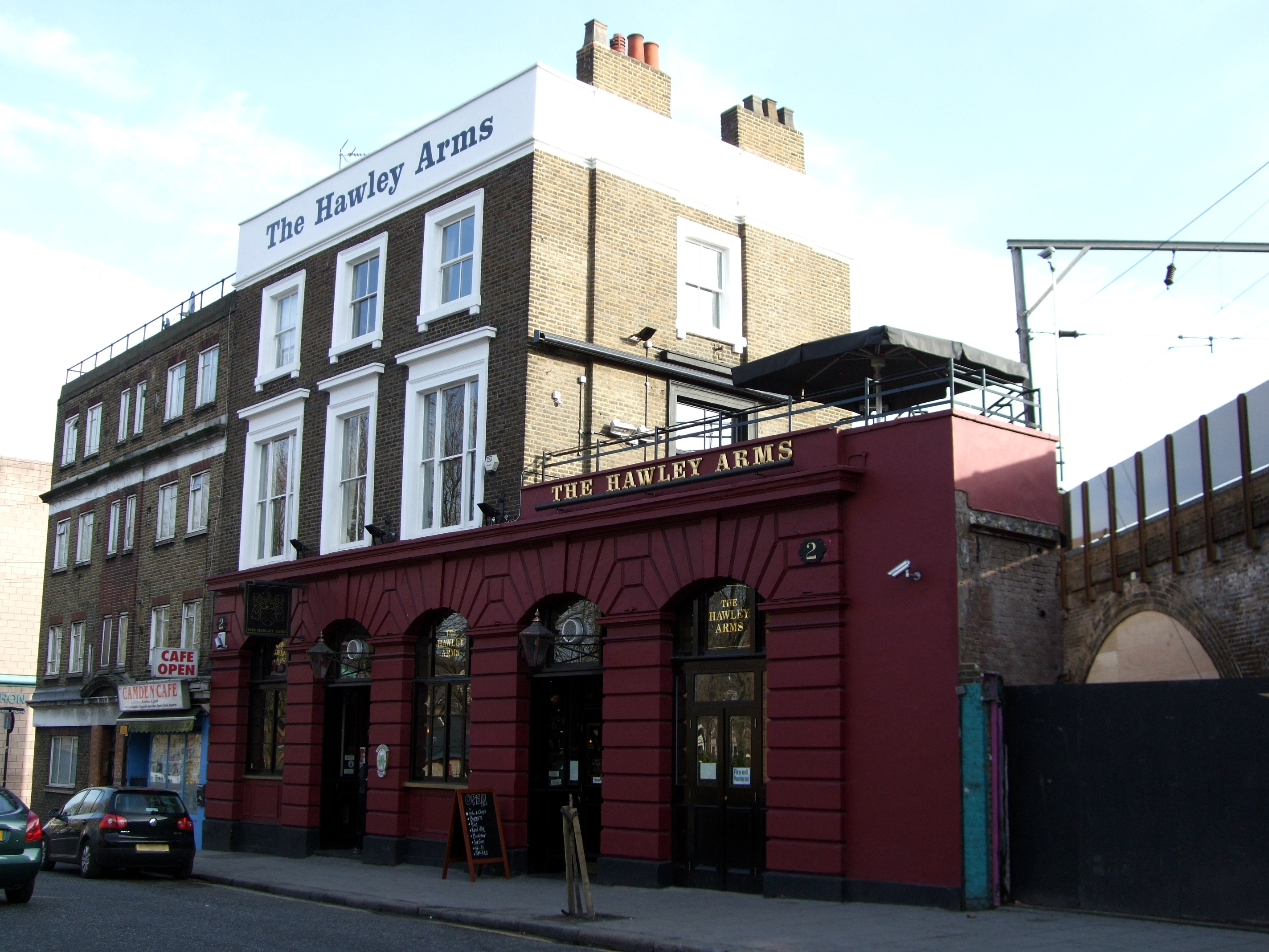
- The Hawley Arms after the 2008 fire

- Location within London Borough of Camden

General information
- Location: Camden Market, Camden Town, Greater London, 2 Castlehaven Road, England
- Coordinates: 51.5420°N 0.1453°W
- Completed: 1851
- Owner: Ruth Mottram; Doug Charles-Ridler

The Hawley Arms is a pub in Camden Town, London.

== History ==
=== Opening (1851–2002) ===
The Hawley Arms dates back to 1851, when it was known as the Hawley Arms Tavern. In February 1851, a brewer sued the East and West India Docks and Birmingham Junction Railway over a piece of land, under which the company was able to acquire with the Lands Clauses of Consolidation Act. The land included the Hawley Arms Tavern and paid a total of £6,500 to the defendant, although it operated a pub in the name of its former tenant. The courts ruled in favor of the brewer.

In the 1980s and 1990s, The Hawley Arms was known as a biker bar and lacked live music. Pub holding company Harmony Leisure bought The Hawley Arms in May 1987 for £500,000. In August 1995, Searchlight reported that the bar's telephone was used by members of the neo-Nazi terrorist organization Combat 18.

=== Purchase and revitalization (2002–2008) ===
In 2002, Ruth Mottram, Doug Charles-Ridler and D-Day bought the bar and installed a jukebox. After several years, the pub invested in an upstairs bar. In 2004, pub brewer Greene King bought the pub.

Singer Amy Winehouse frequented the bar until her death in 2011. Indie rock band Razorlight was also known to appear at the bar. In April 2007, frontman Johnny Borrell was pictured with then-girlfriend Kirsten Dunst after the London premiere of Spider-Man 3 (2007). Rock bands Arctic Monkeys and Kaiser Chiefs were also reported drinking together by tabloid magazines.

=== Camden fire (2008) ===
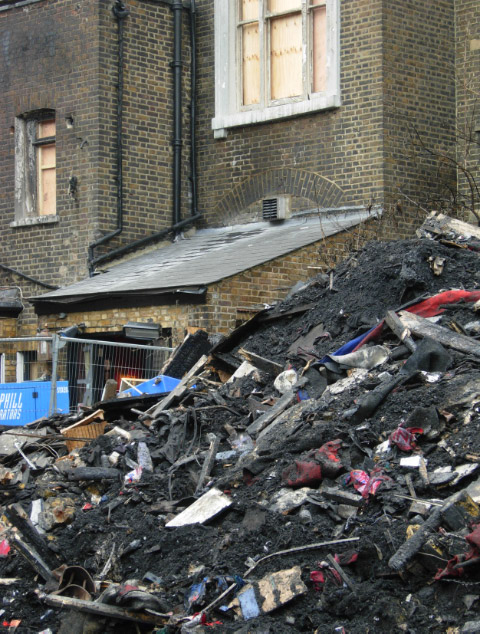
The Hawley Arms following the fire

On the evening of 9 February 2008, a blaze spread throughout Camden Market, severely damaging The Hawley Arms and sectioning off the Camden area for several days. The fire began at 7:00 p.m. BST in an alleyway behind The Hawley Arms and firefighters were dispatched at 7:20 p.m. Over 100 firefighters attempted to extinguish the fire, containing the blaze three hours later. A report by the London Fire Brigade revealed that a liquefied petroleum gas heater ignited material within a clothes stall. Mottram said that the market was not regulated and expressed frustration at Camden Market Holdings Limited, the company in charge of the market. During the 2008 Grammy Awards, Winehouse—having received five awards that night—screamed, "Camden Town ain't burning down!"

The Hawley Arms faced difficulty in reopening, with local regulators refusing to allow a new building at the rear of Castlehaven Road. A spokesperson for the Camden London Borough Council said that the licensees of The Hawley Arms sought to redesign the building, including adding a staircase at the back of the pub. Mottram and Charles-Ridler took to Glastonbury Festival 2008 to advocate for the pub and gather signatures for it to be saved. The two also attended a concert for The Mighty Boosh at the Hop Farm Festival, getting comedian Noel Fielding of The Mighty Boosh, singer Katie Melua, and Babyshambles bass guitarist Drew McConnell to wear a T-shirt bearing the words "Save the Hawley". Keyboard player Stephen Large signed the petition.

On 15 August, several celebrities organized a set at Dingwalls—across from The Hawley Arms—to raise funds for the pub's reconstruction. Among the personalities in attendance included Fielding, Borrell, socialite Kimberly Stewart, and actress Lois Winstone. The event was headlined by McConnell's musical collective Helsinki. Near the end of the set, Winehouse appeared, but was ushered out after an argument with the DJ.

=== Reopening and change of ownership (since 2008) ===
The Hawley Arms reopened on 31 October, after a three-day private party to thank supporters. The owners had hoped to install a staircase at the back which would increase the size of the roof terrace, but planning permission was refused.

In February 2019, Greene King had to sell The Hawley Arms due to a change in government legislation. As any developer, more interested in housing than a pub could have bought it, Mottram and Charles-Ridler decided to bid to buy the pub. To raise funds, they sold a gig setlist signed by Winehouse, and sold T-shirts, bags, and tankards with the words "Hawley Heroes".

Liam Gallagher, Kate Moss, Pete Doherty, and rock band Wolf Alice have all been known to drink at The Hawley Arms.

== In popular culture ==
The Hawley Arms features prominently in the Netflix miniseries Baby Reindeer, where it is fictionalised as 'The Heart'. The pub serves as a crucial setting for a key scene in which the main character encounters the antagonist (a notorious stalker) for the first time. This meeting is pivotal to the series' narrative, establishing the conflict that drives subsequent episodes. The significance of The Hawley Arms in the storyline was highlighted by the individual identified as the real-life inspiration for the series during an interview released on Piers Morgan Uncensored on 9 May 2024.
