= Ukraine: Enemy in the Woods =

2024 documentary film

Ukraine: Enemy in the Woods is a 2024 British documentary about the Russo-Ukrainian war, directed by Jamie Roberts. The film premiered on BBC Two. It focuses on a seven-week operation by the Berlingo Battalion of the Ukrainian Ground Forces in 2023.

== Production ==
Filmmaker Jamie Roberts was embedded with the Berlingo Battalion of the Ukrainian Ground Forces between November and December 2023. During this time, he filmed the daily life and experiences of the soldiers as they carried out a seven-week military operation to defend a railway in Kupiansk. The film includes interviews with members of the battalion as well as drone footage and bodycam footage.

== Reception ==
The film received positive reviews from critics.
