= Danny Kirrane =

British actor

- Born: Daniel Peter Kirrane; Huddersfield, West Yorkshire, England
- Occupation: Actor
- Years active: 2007–present

Daniel Peter Kirrane is a British actor.

Kirrane is from Huddersfield in West Yorkshire.

== Filmography ==
=== Film ===
Year	Title	Role	Notes
2008	Flushed	Sam	Short; as Daniel Kirrane
2012	The Pub	Drunk	Short
2014	Walking on Sunshine	Mikey	
2014	Autómata	Muniesa	
2014	The Hatching	Lardy	
2017	Pirates of the Caribbean: Dead Men Tell No Tales	Bollard	
2017	Game Over	Eric	
2018	Killer Weekend	Eric	
2018	Peterloo	Samuel Drummond	
2018	Ravers	Ozzy	
2018	The Therapist		Short
2020	Hunch		Short
2022	Doghouse	Toby	Short
2022	Not A Mourning Person	Father Lucian	Short
2026	Digger	Sandy Clarkson	

=== Television ===
Year	Title	Role	Notes
2007	Skins	Kevin	Episode: "Effy"
2009	Trinity	David	1 episode
2010	Doctors	Clarke McGuire	Episode: "Hasta La Vista"
2010	Casualty	Billy Tyler	Episode: "Only the Lonely"
2010	The Inbetweeners	Daniel 'The Commander'	Episode: "Trip to Warwick"
2011	Hustle	Michael Williams	Episode: "The Fall of Railton FC"
2011	I Shouldn't Be Alive	Joseph Savanna	Episode: "Ocean Disaster"
2013	Utopia	Clerk	Episode: Pilot
2013	Trollied	Dave	14 episodes
2015	CR:IT:IC:AL	Billy Finlay, ODP	9 episodes
2016	Doctor Thorne	Mr Moffatt	2 episodes
2016	New Blood	Steve Mullen	3 episodes
2016	Wasted	Paul "Morpheus" Durkin	6 episodes
2017	Game of Thrones	Henk	Episode: "The Spoils of War"
2018	Poldark	Harry Harry	3 episodes
2018	Informer	Neil	Episode: "No Sleep Till Brooklyn"
2019	Don't Forget the Driver	Squeaky Dave	6 episodes
2019	Britannia	Holt	Episode: "May the Gods Speak"
2021	Reset the Stage	Chris	Miniseries
2022	The Sandman	Fun Land	2 episodes
2022	The Serpent Queen	Louis de Bourbon	5 episodes
2022	Safe Space	Dean	Episode: "#1.0"
2023	Boat Story	Harold	2 episodes
2024	Baby Reindeer	Gino	7 episodes
