= Marsham Court =

London apartment building, 1937-

Coordinates: 51.493408767269145°N 0.12909480690663622°W

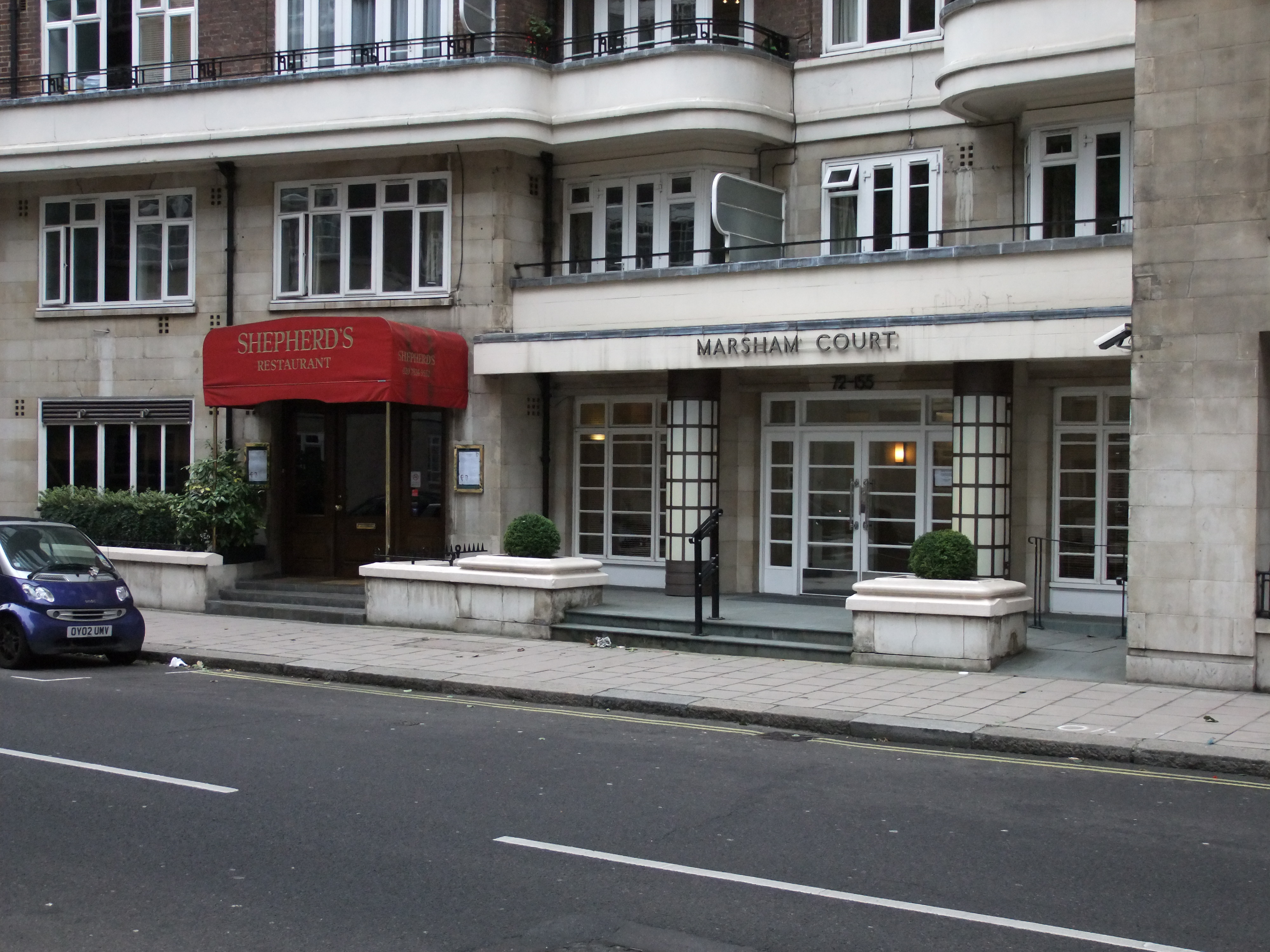
Building entrance

Marsham Court is an apartment building on Marsham Street in Victoria in the City of Westminster in central London. It was designed in the Art Deco style by Thomas Bennett of T.P. Bennett & Son in 1937.

The building has been home to many politicians and civil servants owing to its proximity to government offices and the Palace of Westminster. The Director of MI6, Maurice Oldfield, was a resident at flat No. 6 from the early 1970s until his death in 1981. Jeremy Thorpe, the leader of the Liberal Party, rented a one bedroom flat in Marsham Court from 1962.

A large explosive device was discovered by officers from Special Branch hanging on railings outside Marsham Court on 13 October 1975. The bomb was near Lockett's restaurant, which was directly under Oldfield's flat.

The building contains 147 one- and two-bedroom flats and studios. The flats were fully serviced from inception, with residents served by butlers, maids and waiters. The front doors to apartments in the complex have an adjacent 'butlers cupboard' where residents would put clothes and shoes for cleaning overnight. In a 2009 article on living in Westminster, the Financial Times commented on the residents of Marsham Court's amenities that "Such was the life of a middle-ranking civil servant in the days of empire. Evidence of the unrelenting march of change includes a second world war memo held in the building's records that reads: "Owing to the manpower shortage because of the war effort, residents are required to turn down their own beds"." Marsham Court originally had its own cocktail bar and restaurant.

Marsham Court was the site of Shepherd's restaurant for several years in the 2010s, which was owned by Michael Caine, Peter Langham and Richard Shepherd.
