= 2023 British Academy Television Craft Awards =

Awards ceremony

24th British Academy Television Craft Awards
- Date: 23 April 2023
- Site: The Brewery, London
- Hosted by: Mel Giedroyc

Highlights
- Most awards: This Is Going to Hurt / House of the Dragon (3)
- Most nominations: The English / This Is Going to Hurt (4)

The 24th Annual British Academy Television Craft Awards took place on 23 April 2023 at The Brewery in London, presented by the British Academy of Film and Television Arts (BAFTA) to recognize technical achievements in British television of 2022. The ceremony was hosted by English comedian Mel Giedroyc.

The nominees were announced on 22 March 2023 alongside the nominations for the 2023 British Academy Television Awards. Drama series The English and This Is Going to Hurt led the nominations with four each. Fantasy drama House of the Dragon and medical comedy-drama This Is Going to Hurt received the most awards with three each. Production manager Alison Barnett was honoured with the Special Award.

== Rule changes ==
The British Academy of Film and Television Arts (BAFTA) announced the creation of a new category:

- The Best Original Music was separated into two categories: Original Music: Fiction and Original Music: Factual.

== Winners and nominees ==
The nominees were announced on 22 March 2023. Winners are listed first and in bold.

Best Director: Fiction	Best Director: Factual
**Top Boy – William Stefan Smith (Netflix)**; Bad Sisters – Dearbhla Walsh (Apple TV+); The English – Hugo Blick (BBC Two); This Is Going to Hurt – Lucy Forbes (BBC One)	**The Tinder Swindler – Felicity Morris (Netflix)**; The Mystery of Marilyn Monroe: The Unheard Tapes – Emma Cooper (Netflix); Chernobyl: The Lost Tapes – James Jones (Sky Documentaries); My Dead Body – Sophie Robinson (Channel 4)
Best Director: Multi-Camera	Best Scripted Casting
**The State Funeral of HM Queen Elizabeth II – Directing team (BBC One)**; Glastonbury Festival 2022 – Janet Fraser (BBC Two); Platinum Jubilee: Party at the Palace – Julia Knowles (BBC One); Strictly Come Dancing – Nikki Parsons (BBC One)	**This Is Going to Hurt – Nina Gold, Martin Ware (BBC One)**; Bad Sisters – Nina Gold, Lucy Amos (Apple TV+); Top Boy – Des Hamilton, Elan Jones (Netflix); Am I Being Unreasonable? – Julia Harkin (BBC One)
Best Writer: Comedy	Best Writer: Drama
**Derry Girls – Lisa McGee (Channel 4)**; Big Boys – Jack Rooke (Channel 4); The Dry – Nancy Harris (Britbox); Motherland – Sharon Horgan, Barunka O'Shaughnessy, Helen Serafinowicz, Holly Walsh (BBC One)	**This Is Going to Hurt – Adam Kay (BBC One)**; The Responder – Tony Schumacher (BBC One); Heartstopper – Alice Oseman (Netflix); Somewhere Boy – Pete Jackson (Channel 4)
Best Original Music: Fiction	Best Original Music: Factual
**Mood – Nicôle Lecky, Bryan Senti, Kwame KZ Kwei-Armah Jr. (BBC Three)**; The English – Federico Jusid (BBC Two); Slow Horses – Daniel Pemberton, Mick Jagger (Apple TV+); The Responder – Matthew Herbert (BBC One)	**Jimmy Savile: A British Horror Story – Jessica Jones (Netflix)**; The Tinder Swindler – Jessica Jones (Netflix); House of Maxwell – Andrew Phillips (BBC Two); The Elon Musk Show – Max de Wardener (BBC Two)
Best Entertainment Craft Team	Best Production Design
**Strictly Come Dancing – Catherine Land, David Bishop, Patrick Doherty, Richard Silitto, David Newton, Joe Phillips (BBC One)**; Concert for Ukraine – Jen Bollom, Gareth Iles, Tim Routledge, Steve Sidwell, Richard Valentine, Chris Vaughan (ITV); Platinum Jubilee: Party at the Palace – Tom Bairstow, Nigel Catmur, Andy Deacon, Kevin Duff, Simon Haw, Steve Sidwell (BBC One); Taskmaster – Andy Devonshire, James Dillon, Dru Masters, Rebecca Bowker (Channel 4)	**Don't Hug Me I'm Scared – Becky Sloan, Joe Pelling (Channel 4)**; The Essex Serpent – Alice Normington (Apple TV+); The English – Chris Roope (BBC Two); Pistol – Kave Quinn, Tim Blake, Stella Fox, Penny Crawfold, Emily Norris (Disney+)
Best Costume Design	Best Make Up and Hair Design
**The Essex Serpent – Jane Petrie (Apple TV+)**; The Crown – Amy Roberts (Netflix); Don't Hug Me I'm Scared – Becky Sloan, Joe Pelling (Channel 4); The English – Phoebe de Gaye (BBC Two)	**House of the Dragon – Amanda Knight, Barbie Gower, Rosalia Culora (Sky Atlantic)**; Dangerous Liaisons – Daniel Parker, Deborah Kenton, Claudia Stolze, Jovana Jovanovic, Wayne Fitzsimmons, Jana Radilová (Lionsgate+); Gangs of London – Helen Speyer (Sky Atlantic); Wednesday – Tara McDonald (Netflix)
Best Photography and Lighting: Fiction	Best Photography: Factual
**Jungle – Chas Appeti (Prime Video)**; Pistol – Anthony Dod Mantle (Disney+); The Tourist – Ben Wheeler (HBO Max / BBC One); I Am Ruth – Rachel Clark (Channel 4)	**Children of the Taliban – Marcel Mettelsiefen, Jordan Byron (Channel 4)**; Hold Your Breath: The Ice Dive – Steve Jamison (Netflix); Predators – Sue Gibson, Robin Cox, Florian Schulz, Will Nicholls (Sky Nature); The Green Planet: "Tropical Worlds" – Tim Shepherd, Oliver Mueller, Todd Kewley, Jessica Mitchell, Sam Lewis (BBC One)
Best Sound: Fiction	Best Sound: Factual
**House of the Dragon – Alastair Sirkett, Doug Cooper, Martin Seeley, Paula Fairfield, Tim Hands, Adele Fletcher (Sky Atlantic)**; SAS: Rogue Heroes – Judi Lee Headman, Nigel Squibbs, Tony Gibson, Darren McQuade (BBC One); Slow Horses – Martin Jensen, Joe Beal, Duncan Price, Craig Butters, Sarah Elias, Andrew Sissons (Apple TV+); The Crown – Sound team (Netflix)	**The State Funeral of HM Queen Elizabeth II – Peter Bridges, Matthew Charles, Conrad Fletcher, Julian Gough, Andy James, Andy Payne (BBC One)**; Frozen Planet II: "Frozen Worlds" – Kate Hopkins, Tim Owens, Graham Wild (BBC One); Formula 1: Drive to Survive – Doug Dreger, Andrew Yarme, Nick Fry, Steve Speed, James Evans, Hugh Dwan (Netflix); Later... with Jools Holland – Tudor Davies (BBC Two)
Best Special, Visual and Graphic Effects	Best Titles and Graphic Identity
**House of the Dragon – Angus Bickerton, Nikeah Forde, Asa Shoul, Mike Dawson, MPC, Pixomondo (Sky Atlantic)**; Andor – Mohen Leo, TJ Falls, Richard Van Den Bergh, Jean-Clément Soret, Industrial Light & Magic (Disney+); His Dark Materials – Russell Dodgson, Bryony Duncan, Sam Chynoweth, Damien Stumpf, Danny Hargreaves, Eliot Gibbins (BBC One); The Sandman – Industrial Light & Magic (Netflix)	**Bad Sisters – Peter Anderson Studio (Apple TV+)**; Beijing 2022 Winter Olympics – Balázs Simon, BBC Creative, Gas Music (BBC Two); The Essex Serpent – Yu+Co (Apple TV+); Life After Life – Tom Hingston, Markus Lehtonen, Sam Norris (BBC One)
Best Editing: Fiction	Best Editing: Factual
**This Is Going to Hurt – Selina MacArthur (BBC One)**; The Crown – Celia Haining (Netflix); Andor: "Announcement" – Frances Parker (Disney+); Slow Horses: "Failure's Contagious" – Katie Weiland (Apple TV+)	**Chernobyl: The Lost Tapes – Rupert Houseman (Sky Documentaries)**; Exposure: "Afghanistan: No Country for Women" – Mark Summers (ITV); Jimmy Savile: A British Horror Story – Ben Brown (Netflix); Mortimer & Whitehouse: Gone Fishing – Doug Bryson (BBC Two)
Best Emerging Talent: Fiction	Best Emerging Talent: Factual
**Pete Jackson (Writer) – Somewhere Boy (Channel 4)**; Jack Rooke (Writer) – Big Boys (Channel 4); Lynette Lindon (Director) – My Name is Leon (BBC Two); Nicôle Lecky (Writer) – Mood (BBC Three)	**Charlie Melville (Producer/Director) – John & Joe Bishop: Life After Deaf (ITV)**; Helen Hobin (Photography) – Frozen Planet II (BBC One); Jason Osborne (Director) – Our Jubilee (ITV); Joy Ash (Series Producer) – Super Surgeons: A Chance at Life (Channel 4)
Special Award
**Alison Barnett**

== See also ==
- 2023 British Academy Television Awards
