= 2026 British Academy Television Craft Awards =

Awards ceremony

27th British Academy Television Craft Awards
- Date: 26 April 2026
- Site: The Brewery, London
- Hosted by: Maisie Adam

Highlights
- Most awards: Adolescence (2)
- Most nominations: Andor (6)

The 27th Annual British Academy Television Craft Awards were held on 26 April 2026, at The Brewery in London, presented by the British Academy of Film and Television Arts (BAFTA) to recognize technical achievements in British television of 2025. English comedian Maisie Adam served as host for the ceremony.

The nominees were announced on 24 March 2026, alongside the nominations for the 2026 British Academy Television Awards. Disney+ television series Andor led the nominations with six, followed by A Thousand Blows, Adolescence, and Trespasses with five each.

== Winners and nominees ==
The nominees were announced on 24 March 2026. Winners are listed first and in bold.

Best Director: Fiction	Best Director: Factual
**Philip Barantini – Adolescence (Netflix)**; Dawn Shadforth – Trespasses (Channel 4); Janus Metz – Andor: "Messenger", "Who Are You?", and "Welcome to the Rebellion" (Disney+); Sam Donovan – Severance: "Goodbye, Mrs. Selvig", and "Trojan's Horse" (Apple TV)	**Rob Coldstream – Vietnam: The War That Changed America (Apple TV)**; Benedict Sanderson – See No Evil (Channel 4); Karim Shah – Gaza: Doctors Under Attack (Channel 4); Olaide Sadiq – Grenfell: Uncovered (Netflix)
Best Director: Multi-Camera	Best Scripted Casting
**Laurence Cawsey – Super Sunday: "Liverpool v Tottenham Hotspur" (Sky Sports)**; Ben Archard, Eddie Lewis, Marieke Barker-Benfield – The Celebrity Traitors (BBC One); Ben Hardy – LOL: Last One Laughing UK (Prime Video); Diccon Ramsay – VE Day 80: A Celebration to Remember (BBC One)	**Reunion – Nathan Toth, Julie Harkin (BBC One)**; What It Feels Like for a Girl – Nathan Toth (BBC Three); Adolescence – Shaheen Baig (Netflix); Get Millie Black – Shaheen Baig (Channel 4)
Best Writer: Comedy	Best Writer: Drama
**Jack Rooke – Big Boys (Channel 4)**; Daisy May Cooper, Selin Hizli – Am I Being Unreasonable? (BBC One); Kat Sadler – Such Brave Girls (BBC Three); Steve Coogan, Rob Gibbons, Neil Gibbons – How Are You? It's Alan (Partridge) (BBC One)	**Will Smith – Slow Horses (Apple TV)**; Ailbhe Keogan – Trespasses (Channel 4); Jack Thorne, Stephen Graham – Adolescence (Netflix); Paris Lees – What It Feels Like for a Girl (BBC Three)
Best Original Music: Fiction	Best Original Music: Factual
**Mussolini: Son of the Century – Tom Rowlands (Sky Atlantic)**; Black Mirror: "Hotel Reverie" – Ariel Marx (Netflix); A Thousand Blows – Federico Jusid (Disney+); The Death of Bunny Munro – Nick Cave, Warren Ellis (Sky Atlantic)	**The Last Musician of Auschwitz – Jessica Dannheisser (BBC Two)**; Pangolin: Kulu's Journey – Anne Nikitin (Netflix); The Sycamore Gap Mystery – Louis Dodd, Matthew Sanchez (Channel 4); Moon: Nature's Secret Force – Sophy Purnell (Sky Nature)
Best Entertainment Craft Team	Best Make Up and Hair Design
**The Celebrity Traitors – Ben Archard, Siggi Rosen-Rawlings, James Tinsley, Stuart Frossell, Martin Adams, Nathan Lindley (BBC One)**; Squid Game: The Challenge – Diccon Ramsay, Rikki Finlay, Mat Weekes, Ben Norman, James Tinsley, Robert Mansfield (Netflix); Rob & Romesh Vs – Graham Proud, Toby Wilkinson, Sam Turner, Alex Weeks, Jennifer Ford (Sky Max); One Shot: With Ed Sheeran – Philip Barantini, Nyk Allen, Jacob Smith, Joe Blodgett, Frank Larson, Brendan Poutier (Netflix)	**Amadeus – Vickie Lang, Nik Williams, Barrie Gower (Sky Atlantic)**; Slow Horses – Lucy Sibbick, Victoria Money (Apple TV); Lockerbie: A Search for Truth – Sjaan Gillings (Sky Atlantic); A Thousand Blows – Sian Wilson, Caroline Greenough, Clare Ramsey, Cheryl Garvey, Madlen Mierzwiak (Disney+)
Best Production Design	Best Costume Design
**Juice – Philippa Mumford (BBC Three)**; Trespasses – Gillian Devenney (Channel 4); Andor – Luke Hull, Rebecca Alleway, Toby Britton (Disney+); A Thousand Blows – Tom Burton, Grant Bailey, Barbara Herman-Skelding (Disney+)	**A Thousand Blows – Maja Meschede (Disney+)**; Trespasses – Emma O'Loughlin (Channel 4); Andor – Michael Wilkinson (Disney+); Lockerbie: A Search for Truth – Rhona Russell (Sky Atlantic)
Best Children's Craft Team
**The Very Small Creatures – Lucy Izzard, Andrew Mitchell, Fernando Lechuga, Jean-Marc Petsas, Owen Peters, Bronwen Slater (Sky Kids)**; The Wonderfully Weird World of Gumball – Ben Bocquelet, Joe Sparrow, Luke Allen, James Lancett, Adrian Cathie, Andy Goodman (Cartoon Network); The Scarecrows' Wedding – Samantha Cutler, Jeroen Jaspaert, Steven Bloomer, Terry Davies, Adrian Rhodes, Shannan Taylor (BBC One); BooSnoo! – Simon Partington, Andy Farago, Simon Couzens, Sandy Nuttgens, Alex Copley, Andy Brittain (Sky Kids)
Best Photography and Lighting: Fiction	Best Photography: Factual
**Trespasses – Ryan Kernaghan (Channel 4)**; The Last of Us – Catherine Goldschmidt (Sky Atlantic); Adolescence – Matthew Lewis (Netflix); Severance – Suzie Lavelle (Apple TV)	**Exposure: "Our Land: Israel's Other War" – Jordan Bryon (ITV1)**; Secrets of the Penguins – Camera Team (Disney+); Exposure: "State of War: Fighting the Narcos" – Marcel Mettelsiefen (ITV1); Surviving Black Hawk Down – Stefano Ferrari, Tim Cragg (Netflix)
Best Sound: Fiction	Best Sound: Factual
**Adolescence – James Drake, Jules Woods, Rob Entwistle, Kiff Mcmanus, Kyle Pickford, Adam Méndez (Netflix)**; Slow Horses – Andrew Sissons, Martin Jensen, Ben Tisdall, Joe Beal, Duncan Price, Conor Thompson (Apple TV); Andor – Danny Hambrook, David Acord, Margit Pfeiffer, James Spencer, Josh Gold, John Finklea (Disney+); Lockerbie: A Search for Truth – Lee Walpole, Stuart Hilliker, Saoirse Christopherson, Andy Kennedy, Lee Crichlow, Chris Campion (Sky Atlantic)	**The Celebrity Traitors – Sound Team (BBC One)**; The Lost Music of Auschwitz – Andy Deacon, Kevin Duff, Will Thomas Jonathan Gibson (Sky Arts); Formula 1: Drive to Survive – Sound Team (Netflix); The Last Musician of Auschwitz – Tristan Powell, Will Chapman (BBC Two)
Best Special, Visual and Graphic Effects	Best Titles and Graphic Identity
**Andor – Mohen Leo, TJ Falls, Luke Murphy, Neal Scanlan, Jean-Clément Soret, Industrial Light & Magic (Disney+)**; Black Mirror: "USS Callister: Into Infinity" – James MacLachlan, Josie Henwood, Union VFX, Stargate Studios Malta, Magic Lab, Sam Chynoweth (Netflix); Prehistoric Planet: Ice Age – Russell Dodgson, Framestore, Andy Jones, Simon Bland, François Dumoulin, Gavin McKenzie (Apple TV); The Witcher – Sara Bennett, Richard Reed, David Stephens, Jet Omoshebi, Caimin Bourne, Scanline (Netflix)	**UEFA Women's Euro 2025 – Nicos Livesey, Bart Yates, Rebecca Little, Aron Sidhu, Steven Lownes (BBC One)**; Code of Silence – Huge Designs (ITV1); The Death of Bunny Munro – Isabella Eklöf, Luke Dunkley, Mike Holliday, Tony Kearns, Dean Wares (Sky Atlantic); A Thousand Blows – Light Creative (Disney+)
Best Editing: Fiction	Best Editing: Factual
**Prisoner 951 – Úna Ní Dhonghaíle (BBC One)**; Slow Horses: "Scars" – Fiona Brands (Apple TV); The Last of Us – Simon Smith (Sky Atlantic); Andor – Yan Miles (Disney+)	**Gaza: Doctors Under Attack – Mel Quigley, Andy Kemp (Channel 4)**; Attack on London: Hunting the 7/7 Bombers – Jennifer Asheitu Hampson (Netflix); Louis Theroux: The Settlers – Paul Hammacott (BBC Two); Grenfell: Uncovered – Samuel R. Santana (Netflix)
Best Emerging Talent: Fiction	Best Emerging Talent: Factual
**Janice Okoh – Just Act Normal (BBC Three)**; Chloe English (Director) – G'wed (ITV2); Emily Mcdonald (Director) – Am I Being Unreasonable? (BBC One); Eros V (Director) – Juice (BBC Three)	**Olaide Sadiq (Director) – Grenfell: Uncovered (Netflix)**; Alexandra Lacey (Writer/Director) – The Twister: Caught in the Storm (Netflix); Elle Mower (Director) – Convicting My Ex (BBC Three)
Special Award
**Simone Pennant**

== See also ==
- 2026 British Academy Television Awards
