= British Academy Television Award for Best Short Form =

Annual UK television award

British Academy Television Award
- Country: United Kingdom
- Presented by: British Academy of Film and Television Arts
- First award: 2018
- Currently held by: Hustle and Run (2026)
- Website: http://www.bafta.org/

The British Academy Television Award for Best Short Form Programme is one of the major categories of the British Academy Television Awards (BAFTAs), the primary awards ceremony of the British television industry.

According to BAFTA Rules and Guidelines, the category is for "single shorts, short form series and shorts from a strand of any genre that have been commissioned and transmitted on a broadcast channel and/or online platform." Short form programmes are defined as having runtimes with "a minimum of three minutes and no longer than 20 minutes."

== Winners and nominees ==
=== 2010s ===
Year	Title	Recipient(s)	Broadcaster
2018	Morgana Robinson's Summer		Sky Arts
2018	Britain's Forgotten Men		BBC Three
2018	Eating with My Ex		BBC Three
2018	Pls Like		BBC Three
2019	Missed Call		Real Stories
2019	Bovril Pam (Snatches: Moments from 100 Years of Women's Lives)		BBC Four
2019	The Mind of Herbert Clunkerdunk	Spencer Jones, Jon Riche, David Simpson	BBC iPlayer
2019	Wonderdate	Lydia Hampson, Tim Key, Jonathan van Tulleken	BBC iPlayer

=== 2020s ===
Year	Title	Recipient(s)	Broadcaster
2020	Brain in Gear	Gbemisola Ikumelo, Fergal Costello, Inez Gordon	BBC iPlayer
2020	Anywhere But Westminster	John Domokos, John Harris	The Guardian
2020	Soon Gone: A Windrush Chronicle	Roy Williams, Tinge Krishnan, Carol Harding	BBC Four
2020	Toni_With_An_I	Marco Alessi, Ksenia Harwood, Mary Antony	BBC Four
2021	They Saw the Sun First	Stefan Hunt, Jess Lowe, Adam Gee	Red Bull TV
2021	Criptales	Mat Fraser, Amit Sharma, Ewan Marshall, Jenny Sealey, Debbie Christie	BBC Four
2021	Disabled Not Defeated: The Rock Band with Learning Disabilities	Rosie Baldwin, Holly Stimson, Dan Knight	Noisey
2021	The Main Part	Rosie Westhoff, Jen Wakefield, Sara Huxley, Tom Payne, Jody Smith	BBC iPlayer
2022	Our Land	Alexandra Genova, Alfred Thirolle	Together TV
2022	Hollyoaks Saved My Life (Hollyoaks IRL)	Rachel Hardy, Alan Toner, Graham Gallery	YouTube
2022	People You May Know	Juliet Riddell, James Graham, Tom Hannen, Franklin Dow	Financial Times
2022	Please Help	Lucy Pearman, Ben Mallaby, David Simpson	BBC Three
2023	How to Be a Person	Anna Hashmi, Sindha Agha, Samira Mian, Anne Perrie, Tobi Kyeremateng	E4
2023	Always, Asifa	Shiva Raichandani, Alex Balcombe	Together TV
2023	Biscuitland	Jess Thom, Matthew Pountney, Christine Robertson, Jon Rolph	All 4
2023	Kingpin Cribs		Channel 4
2024	Mobility	Jack Carroll, Thomas Gregory, Akaash Meeda, David Simpson, Sam Ward	BBC Three
2024	Where It Ends	Jack Robertson, Fergal Costello, Sam Ward, David Simpson	BBC Three
2024	The Sekwer: Three Twisted Year		BBC iPlayer
2024	Stealing Ukraine's Children: Inside Russia's Camps		Vice News
2025	Quiet Life	Ruth Pickett, Alex Bruce, Luke Rollason	BBC Three
2025	Brown Brit	Jay Stephen, Ralph Briscoe	Channel 4
2025	Peaked	John Addis, Ada Player, Bron Waugh	Channel 4
2025	Spud	Siobhán McSweeney, Pippa Brown, Leah Draws	BBC Three
2026	Hustle and Run	Jonny Madderson, Jono Stevens, Sara Conlon	Channel 4
2026	Donkey		BBC Three
2026	Rocket Fuel	Jordon Scott Kennedy, Leah Henry, Casey Shaw	BBC iPlayer
2026	Zoners		BBC Three

Note: The series that don't have recipients on the tables had "Production team" credited as recipients for the award or nomination.
