= Olisa Odele =

English actor

- Education: Guildford School of Acting (BA)
- Occupation: Actor
- Years active: 2004–present
- Television: Big Boys

Olisa Odele is an English actor. He played Yemi on all three series of Channel 4 coming-of-age comedy drama series Big Boys (2022–2025). As a child actor, he previously appeared in forty episodes of My Parents are Aliens (2004–2005).

== Career ==
He early television appearances included forty episodes of My Parents are Aliens. He played Ola in Michaela Coel's series Chewing Gum on E4. He also appeared in It’s a Sin. In 2019, he appeared in BBC One comedy series Scarborough.

He had a main role as Yemi in all three series of Jack Rooke created Channel 4 coming-of-age comedy drama series Big Boys, with his performance described as "regally characteristic".

He played Peter in 2024 British comedy series Dead Hot which aired on Amazon Prime Video. He appeared on stage as Isom in the British National Theatre tour of comedy stage play The Hot Wing King in 2024.

In February 2025, he could be seen in both series of Daisy May Cooper comedy drama series Am I Being Unreasonable? on BBC One.

== Personal life ==
He is from London and has Nigerian heritage. He trained at the BRIT School and Guildford School of Acting, graduating in 2017.

== Filmography ==
Year	Title	Role	Notes
2004–2005	My Parents are Aliens	C.J.	40 episodes
2016–2017	Chewing Gum	Ola	8 episodes
2018	Sick of It	Olly	1 episode
2019	Scarborough	PC Merrick	4 episodes
2019	Down from London	Robin	1 episode
2021	It’s a Sin	Cassius	1 episode
2022	Starstruck	Damien	1 episode
2022–present	Am I Being Unreasonable?	Jesus	3 episodes
2022–2025	Big Boys	Yemi	Main cast
2023	Surprised by Oxford	Fred	
2024	Dead Hot	Peter	6 episodes
2026	My Parents are Aliens: Next Generation	C.J.	Upcoming

== Selected stage credits ==
Year	Title	Role	Notes
2025	Fat Ham by James Ijames	Juicy	Swan Theatre, Stratford-upon-Avon
