= British Academy Television Craft Award for Best Writer: Drama =

Award for technical achievements in TV

British Academy Television Craft Award
- Country: United Kingdom
- Presented by: British Academy of Film and Television Arts
- First award: 2013
- Currently held by: Will Smith for Slow Horses (2026)
- Website: http://www.bafta.org/

The British Academy Television Craft Award for Best Writer: Drama is one of the categories presented by the British Academy of Film and Television Arts (BAFTA) within the British Academy Television Craft Awards, the craft awards were established in 2000 with their own, separate ceremony as a way to spotlight technical achievements, without being overshadowed by the main production categories.

An award for the writers of a television programme was existed since the creation of the BAFTA Television Awards with categories named Best Script, Best Scriptwriter and Writer being presented from the 50s to the 70s. In 2006 the category Best Writer was created, this category was awarded until 2013 when it was split into two separate categories (Writer: Comedy and Writer: Drama) to recognise the differences in writing for comedy and drama programmes on television.

== Winners and nominees ==
=== 1950s ===
Writers Award

Year	Recipient(s)	Title
1955	Iain McCormack	

Best Scriptwriter

Year	Recipient(s)	Title
1956	Colin Morris	
1957	Spike Milligan	
1958	Colin Morris	
1959	Colin Morris	

=== 1960s ===
Best Scriptwriter

Year	Recipient(s)	Title
1960	Galton and Simpson	
1961	Alun Owen	

Best Script

Year	Recipient(s)	Title
1962	Giles Cooper	
1963	Troy Kennedy Martin	
1964	Harold Pinter	
1965	Ken Taylor	
1966	Michael Mills and Richard Waring	The World of Wooster; Marriage Lines
1966	John Elliott	Mogul; The Truth Game
1966	John Hopkins	Horror of Darkness; Parade's End; A Man Like Orpheus; Fable; I Took My Little World Away; Z-Cars
1966	Harold Pinter	The Tea Party
1967	Dennis Potter	
1968	John Hopkins	
1969	Marty Feldman and Barry Took	Marty

=== 1970s ===
Best Script

Year	Title	Recipient(s)
1970	The Life and Times of Lord Mountbatten	John Terraine
1970	Bird's Eye View ("Beside The Seaside", "An Englishman's Home")	John Betjeman
1970	Callan	James Mitchell
1970	Civilisation	Kenneth Clark
1970	Monty Python's Flying Circus	Writing Team
1970	The Son of Man	Dennis Potter
1971	Slattery's Mounted Foot; Say Goodnight To Your Grandma; The Hallelujah Handshake; Roll On 4 O'Clock	Colin Welland
1971	On Trial: The Chicago Conspiracy Trial	Stuart Hood
1971	The Roads to Freedom	David Turner
1971	The Six Wives of Henry VIII: Catherine of Aragon	Rosemary Anne Sisson
1972	The Benny Hill Show	Benny Hill
1972	Act of Betrayal; Cider with Rosie	Hugh Whitemore
1972	Casanova; Paper Roses/Traitor	Dennis Potter
1972	Edna, The Inebriate Woman	Jeremy Sandford

=== 2000s ===
Year	Recipient(s)	Title	Broadcaster
2006	Peter Kosminsky	The Government Inspector	Channel 4
2006	Andrew Davies	Bleak House	BBC One
2006	Russell T Davies	Doctor Who	BBC One
2006	Ricky Gervais, Stephen Merchant	Extras	BBC Two
2007	Peter Morgan	Longford	Channel 4
2007	Ricky Gervais, Stephen Merchant	Extras	BBC Two
2007	Matthew Graham	Life on Mars	BBC One
2007	Frank Deasy	Prime Suspect: The Final Act	ITV
2008	Steven Moffat	Doctor Who (for "Blink")	BBC One
2008	Tony Marchant	The Mark of Cain	Channel 4
2008	Jimmy McGovern	The Street	BBC One
2008	Heidi Thomas	Cranford	BBC One
2009	Peter Moffat	Criminal Justice	BBC One
2009	Sam Bain, Jesse Armstrong	Peep Show	Channel 4
2009	Simon Block	The Shooting of Thomas Hurndall	Channel 4
2009	Russell T Davies	Doctor Who (for "Midnight")	BBC One

=== 2010s ===
Best Writer

Year	Recipient(s)	Title	Broadcaster
2010	Guy Hibbert	Five Minutes of Heaven	BBC Two
2010	Peter Bowker	Occupation	BBC One
2010	Heidi Thomas	Cranford	BBC One
2010	Writing Team	The Thick of It	BBC Two
2011	Peter Bowker	Eric and Ernie	BBC Two
2011	Jo Brand, Joanna Scanlan, Vicki Pepperdine	Getting On	BBC Four
2011	Stephen Butchard	Five Daughters	BBC One
2011	Iain Morris, Damon Beesley	The Inbetweeners	E4
2012	Steven Moffat	Sherlock (for "A Scandal in Belgravia")	BBC One
2012	Neil McKay	Appropriate Adult	ITV
2012	Abi Morgan	Birdsong	BBC One
2012	Jack Thorne	The Fades	BBC Three

Best Writer: Drama

Year	Recipient(s)	Title	Broadcaster
2013	Sally Wainwright	Last Tango in Halifax	BBC One
2013	Gwyneth Hughes	The Girl	BBC Two
2013	Tom Stoppard	Parade's End	BBC Two
2013	Shaun Duggan, Jimmy McGovern	Accused (for "Tracie's Story")	BBC One
2014	Dominic Mitchell	In The Flesh	BBC Three
2014	Chris Chibnall	Broadchurch	ITV
2014	Sally Wainwright	Last Tango in Halifax	BBC One
2014	Dennis Kelly	Utopia	Channel 4
2015	Sally Wainwright	Happy Valley	BBC One
2015	Peter Bowker	Marvellous	BBC Two
2015	Jed Mercurio	Line of Duty	BBC Two
2015	Dennis Kelly	Utopia	Channel 4
2016	Russell T Davies	Cucumber	Channel 4
2016	Mike Bartlett	Doctor Foster	BBC One
2016	Neil Cross	Luther	BBC One
2016	Peter Straughan	Wolf Hall	BBC Two
2017	Sally Wainwright	Happy Valley	BBC One
2017	Peter Morgan	The Crown	Netflix
2017	Levi David Addai	Damilola, Our Loved Boy	BBC One
2017	Simon Nye	The Durrells	ITV
2018	Nicole Taylor	Three Girls	BBC One
2018	Charlie Brooker	Hang the DJ (Black Mirror)	Netflix
2018	Peter Morgan	The Crown	Netflix
2018	Steven Knight	Peaky Blinders	BBC Two
2019	David Nicholls	Patrick Melrose	Sky Atlantic
2019	Lennie James	Save Me	Sky Atlantic
2019	Phoebe Waller-Bridge	Killing Eve	BBC One
2019	Russell T. Davies	A Very English Scandal	BBC One

=== 2020s ===
Year	Recipient(s)	Title	Broadcaster
2020	Jesse Armstrong	Succession	Sky Atlantic
2020	Charlie Covell	The End of the F***ing World	Channel 4
2020	Shane Meadows, Jack Thorne	The Virtues	Channel 4
2020	Craig Mazin	Chernobyl	Sky Atlantic
2021	Michaela Coel	I May Destroy You	BBC One
2021	Lucy Kirkwood	Adult Material	Channel 4
2021	Alastair Siddons and Steve McQueen	Small Axe	BBC One
2021	Lucy Prebble	I Hate Suzie	Sky Atlantic
2022	Kayleigh Llewellyn	In My Skin	BBC Three
2022	Jack Thorne	Help	Channel 4
2022	Russell T Davies	It's a Sin	Channel 4
2022	Jesse Armstrong	Succession	HBO/Sky Atlantic
2023	Adam Kay	This Is Going to Hurt	BBC One
2023	Alice Oseman	Heartstopper	Netflix
2023	Tony Schumacher	The Responder	BBC One
2023	Pete Jackson	Somewhere Boy	Channel 4
2024	Charlie Brooker, Bisha K. Ali	Black Mirror: "Demon 79"	Netflix
2024	Jesse Armstrong	Succession	HBO / Sky Atlantic
2024	Sally Wainwright	Happy Valley	BBC One
2024	Sarah Phelps	The Sixth Commandment	BBC One
2025	Richard Gadd	Baby Reindeer	Netflix
2025	Mickey Down, Konrad Kay	Industry	BBC One
2025	Nicole Taylor	One Day	Netflix
2025	Gwyneth Hughes	Mr Bates vs The Post Office	ITV1
2026	Will Smith	Slow Horses	Apple TV
2026	Jack Thorne, Stephen Graham	Adolescence	Netflix
2026	Ailbhe Keogan	Trespasses	Channel 4
2026	Paris Lees	What It Feels Like for a Girl	BBC Three

== See also ==
- Primetime Emmy Award for Outstanding Writing for a Drama Series
- Primetime Emmy Award for Outstanding Writing for a Limited Series, Movie, or Dramatic Special
