= Big Boys (TV series) =

British television sitcom

- Genre: Sitcom
- Created by: Jack Rooke
- Based on: Cheer The F**k Up; Good Grief; Happy Hour; Love Letters by Jack Rooke
- Written by: Jack Rooke
- Directed by: Jim Archer
- Starring: Dylan Llewellyn; Jon Pointing; Camille Coduri; Izuka Hoyle; Olisa Odele; Harriet Webb; Katy Wix
- Narrated by: Jack Rooke
- Theme music composer: Fryars
- Country of origin: United Kingdom
- Original language: English
- No. of series: 3
- No. of episodes: 18

Production
- Executive producer: Jack Rooke
- Producers: Bertie Peek; Ash Atalla; Alex Smith; Jack Rooke; Thomas Dixon; Chelsea Chandler; Franky Chadwick
- Running time: 23–24 minutes
- Production company: Roughcut Television

Original release
- Network: Channel 4
- Release: 26 May 2022 – 23 February 2025

Big Boys is a British television sitcom created and written by Jack Rooke, first broadcast on Channel 4 and available on All 4 from 26 May 2022. It stars Dylan Llewellyn and Jon Pointing as first-year university students who live together, set from 2013, told from the point of view of Llewellyn's character Jack—a semi-fictionalised version of Rooke, who narrates the series—as he recovers from his father's death and explores his sexuality for the first time.

The show was renewed for a second series in August 2022, which began filming in May 2023. Set during the 2014–15 academic year, it began airing on 14 January 2024. A third series was confirmed in June 2024. This was later confirmed as the final series in January 2025, and began airing on Channel 4 on 9 February 2025 with all episodes made available on All 4 following the series premiere.

== Cast and characters ==
=== Main ===
- Dylan Llewellyn as Jack, a closeted, shy 19-year-old student on a journalism scholarship, who is grieving over his father's death and unused to the heavy social life of university, having been cooped up at home for the past few years with his mother.
- Jon Pointing as Danny, a 25-year-old mature student, who is keen on nights out and trying to chat up female students, while dealing with, and disguising, his mental health issues for which he takes antidepressants.
- Camille Coduri as Peggy, Jack's mother, who hides her struggles over sending her son away to university, having had him to rely on for the past couple of years. Jack has hidden his sexuality from her, expecting a bad reaction.
- Izuka Hoyle as Corinne, a studious and serious Oxbridge reject, who is also eager to let her hair down.
- Olisa Odele as Yemi, a fashion student who accompanies Jack as he tries to explore his sexuality at university.
- Harriet Webb as Shannon (main series 2-3, recurring series 1), Jack's effervescent cousin, whose job running children's parties is not fulfilling her aspirations as she would like.
- Katy Wix as Jules, a former Brent Uni student-turned-student union officer, possessing an overenthusiastic and zealous approach to integrating new students.
- Jack Rooke as narrator, the series creator who acts as narrator throughout the series. He also appears in a few scenes.

=== Recurring ===
- Annette Badland as Nanny Bingo, Jack's grandmother.
- Sheila Reid as Iris, Danny's grandmother, whose Alzheimer's is slowly worsening.
- Robert Gilbert as Tim, a young journalism lecturer who is a focus of lust for Jack and readily deals in caustic language when approaching student queries.
- Lucia Keskin as Kelly, a student union representative who apathetically assists Jules.
- Ian Burfield as Laurie, Jack's father, (series 1-2) who died from cancer two years before Jack started university. He is seen in flashback and memories from various characters.
- Kristy Philipps as Leisa (series 1), a feminist student initially hesitant to Danny's charms, but get together down the line.
- Callum Mardy as Ash (series 1), a student union representative who deals drugs to new students on the side.
- Rhiannon Clements as 'Mad Debs' (series 1), a first-year student from Newcastle upon Tyne who drops out in the first week.
- Mark Silcox as Dhru 'Ru' Pal (series 1), a security officer at the university halls.
- Shane Zaza as Tariq Millar (series 2–3), a delivery driver and the father of Shannon's children.
- James Doherty as Russell (series 2-3), Peggy's new love interest.
- Marc Warren as Dennis King (series 2-3), Danny's estranged father.
- Jake Dunn as Oscar (series 2), a gay fresher who is attracted to both Jack and Yemi.

== Episodes ==
=== Series 1 (2022) ===
All episodes were made available on Channel 4's streaming service (formerly All 4) prior to broadcast on 26 May 2022.

No.	Title	Directed by	Written by	Channel 4 airdate	Viewers (excl. on-demand) (Note: Ratings are 7-day consolidated, and exclude viewership prior to linear broadcast through All 4, and any on 'devices' (PCs, tablets, and smartphones). As a result, these numbers will not accurately and fully reflect episode viewership, and should be considered with caution.)
1	"Hello You"	Jim Archer	Jack Rooke	26 May 2022	817,000
Jack, a 19-year-old who has deferred his place at university a year following his father's death, finds himself thrown together with Danny, a 25-year-old mature student, after an administrative error leaves the two living in a disused shed on campus. Danny tries to drag Jack out of his comfort zone by taking him to socialise at the freshers' events, where Jack's attempts to hook up go badly awry.
2	"I Wanna Take You to a Gay Bar!"	Jim Archer	Jack Rooke	26 May 2022	502,000
Attending the freshers' fair, Jack is roped in to the LGBTQ+ society trip to a gay bar, as Danny meets his match trying to chat up a couple of feminists, including sharp-tongued Corinne; both end up tagging along to the gay bar when Danny discovers he and Jack are barred from entering halls, and going to its parties. Jack is introduced to the gay scene, while Danny's excitement at hooking up with Corinne proves short-lived.
3	"Merry Sexmas"	Jim Archer	Jack Rooke	2 June 2022	386,000
December 2013. A misdirected punishment results in Jack being front-and-centre of Jules' Sexual Health Awareness Week, exacerbating his insecurity about the size of his penis which results in a rather impetuous hook-up with someone who turns out to be much older than on first impression. Danny has managed a workaround to his antidepressants' effect on his ability to get an erection - that's generated a less-than-gratifying name for him on campus - and struggles to reconcile the fact he can only have one or the other.
4	"Dad, I Did Drugs"	Jim Archer	Jack Rooke	2 June 2022	320,000
March 2014. Jack's attempts to rally his underwhelming grades are hindered by his lust for the course's brusque lecturer, while Danny begins to spiral following his decision to stop taking his medication - allowing him to have a normal sex life - which gets the better of the entire group; edibles abound, as Danny tries to distract himself from real life and Jack is encouraged to emulate his father and make him proud, with a messy and complicated aftermath.
5	"What a Bummer"	Jim Archer	Jack Rooke	9 June 2022	<298,000
May/June 2014. Jack and Corinne become concerned about Danny, who has shut himself off from the two recently, only to discover he hasn't been attending classes, has failed his first year, and needs to appeal to overturn the university's decision to block him from further study. Meanwhile, Jack is determined to lose his virginity, and enlists Yemi into helping him prepare himself for anal sex, who is also busy campaigning to become LGBTQ+ society president. Sharon convinces Peggy to attend a widows' dating night, but her nerves and worry she's betraying her husband get the better of her.
6	"The Letter"	Jim Archer	Jack Rooke	9 June 2022	<298,000
June 2014. Danny has cut all contact with Jack and Corinne, and returns home to Margate to find that his grandmother's condition has deteriorated; a visit that goes wrong pushes him close to the edge. Also returning home for the summer holiday, Jack is dead set on coming out to his mum, but is faced with a series of interruptions that result in an unexpected reunion and revelations about the two closest men to him in his life.

=== Series 2 (2024) ===
All episodes were made available on 29 December 2023 for subscribers to the paid tier of Channel 4's streaming service; this expanded to all users on 14 January 2024.

No.	Title	Directed by	Written by	Channel 4 airdate	Viewers (excl. on-demand)
1	"The Boys Are Back in Town"	Jim Archer	Jack Rooke	14 January 2024	679,000
August/September 2014. Danny is now practically one of the family, and - along with Yemi and Corinne - accompanies Jack to his dead father's 60th birthday bash. While there, Jack receives a stark reminder that he hasn't embraced his fully-out gay self, and tries to become abreast with theory in the month before uni restarts as Danny deals with the search for student housing. His high standards - and brash antics while playing dirty with the estate agent - risk the four living insecurely for the year, until a familiar blue shed hoves into view. Shannon struggles with the revelation that she's pregnant, but more so with ensuring that the news is kept on a need-to-know basis.
2	"Strictly Cum Dumping"	Jim Archer	Jack Rooke	14 January 2024	538,000
September 2014. A new influx of freshers sees Jack and Danny encouraged to flex their flirting muscles again. Danny discovers that trying to pull someone eight years his junior is laborious and frustrating, his lack of success compounded by an unwelcome text from a father he's been estranged from for nearly two decades. Jack's reluctance in attempting to find someone proves well-grounded; the friendship group is unsettled when Yemi apparently sleeps with someone he was hoping to. The situation becomes even more astounding, however, when Corinne revels in finding out that Yemi is actually camming. Shannon is less-than-enthused about the prospect of informing her Asos delivery driver that he is the father of her child.
3	"Tennis Table Tennis"	Jim Archer	Jack Rooke	21 January 2024	N/A
December 2014. Jack, whose continued infatuation with brusque lecturer Tim is growing obsessive, sees an opportunity to pin down his sexuality: taking advantage of his attempts to offload his table tennis table to scope him and his life out, rebuffing accusations he's effectively stalking him. Danny willingly ropes himself into an all-night session helping Yemi frantically finish his fashion course assignment by the deadline; Danny's desire for a distraction from the heavy burden of whether or not to meet with his estranged father, and Yemi having considered accompanying a rattled Corinne to an abortion more of a priority... though letting her deal with the sudden reappearance of her boyfriend herself.
4	"Surprise, Surprise!"	Jim Archer	Jack Rooke	28 January 2024	N/A (<380,000)
March 2015. The gang is determined to ensure Danny has a 27th birthday to remember, but Jack's overenthusiastic approach to the day leads to him setting impossibly high standards for himself, in particular for his harried arrangement of a surprise party - and excoriation of Shannon for her lack of effort. Danny, meanwhile, spends the day continuing to try and make up for lost time with his father, whose broken promise to stay away from the booze leads to an unwelcome revelation and an explosion. Peggy is reluctantly convinced of the benefits of dating apps, but finds someone closer to home to give her late husband's key to.
5	"All Work and No Play Makes Jack a Dull Gay"	Jim Archer	Jack Rooke	4 February 2024	N/A (<409,000)
May 2015. It's work experience week, as Jack heads off to assist with call-taking at a radio station for teenagers and its obnoxiously zealous host, while Danny is delegated to the offices of an online lads' magazine... Corinne not happy to also be tagging along at the last minute. Her fears over the misogynistic, sexist and egregiously laddish culture are at first rebuffed but then gradually come to be shared by Danny, while Jack is less-than-keen about his (lack of a) sex life being shared over the airwaves. Peggy and Shannon encourage each other to put more effort into exploring what they could have with potential other halves in their lives, leading to a shock for one of them.
6	"The Night When"	Jim Archer	Jack Rooke	11 February 2024	N/A (<407,000)
The different ends of life collide as the pilgrimage to Watford Hospital's maternity ward takes Jack and the family by the hospice, where they said goodbye to Laurie some years ago, and reminiscing about what and who has been lost leads them to imagine - and put in place - what can make them whole again. Danny gets roped into assisting Shannon give birth by irritatingly ebullient nurses, Yemi dives head-first into taking advantage of the change of scene for his Grindr exploits, while Corinne struggles to cope with sticking around for the night with how much of what's happening relates to her own traumatic upbringing.

=== Series 3 (2025) ===
All episodes were added to Channel 4 on-demand before broadcast on 9 February 2025.

No.	Title	Directed by	Written by	Channel 4 airdate	Viewers (excl. on-demand)
1	"My Big Fat Gay Greek Holiday"	Jim Archer	Jack Rooke	9 February 2025	524,000
A bingo win for Shannon sees her treat everyone to a four-night stay in Faliraki. Jack's frustration at not completing his checklist of sexual positions ends up burning him in multiple ways. Best intentions made on shaky assumptions bite back at Danny, with Corinne less-than-impressed at his idea of accommodation and his decision to allow his insecurities take charge when she starts to attract attention from both sexes. Peggy is downhearted when she makes her biggest move yet with Russell - and later becomes mortified upon discovering it was bigger than expected - while Shannon is confronted by lovelorn Tariq's expectation that being parents to the same child also means a relationship exists between them.
2	"Happy Anniversary, You Silly Billy!"	Jim Archer	Jack Rooke	9 February 2025	N/A (<408,000)
Dissertations find themselves on the top of everyone's in-tray - with assured confidence and headstrong beliefs prone to debilitation - proving especially problematic for Danny, who is simultaneously clueless as to what direction to go in and juggling multiple priorities at once; his fracturing relationship with Corinne seeing his attention and competence slip the most. Jack finds Yemi's next steps being prioritised above his own, as he struggles to convince him not to drop out in order to get a head start in the industry. Peggy foolishly takes advice for her date at home with Russell from Shannon - as she embarks on her first with Tariq - while fighting her loyalty to her departed husband Laurie and everyone's insistence that she continue to lessen grief's grip.
3	"Thin Lips, Fat Lines & a Poem on Princess Di"	Jim Archer	Jack Rooke	16 February 2025	N/A
December 2015. Jack finds his attempts at greater idiosyncrasy coming across as self-important and pretentious, when he makes a somewhat misguided delve into poetry. Danny starts to worry about his future when his expectations for it are upended by Corinne's revelation she'll be away doing a Master's back home in Edinburgh for a year. Shannon is bereft when she learns she is pregnant again, though more so regarding her foolish decision to dump all her maternity and newborn baby clothes to a charity shop... and her also foolish decision to try and recoup them.
4	"Eurovision, Brexit & Shloer"	Jim Archer	Jack Rooke	16 February 2025	N/A
January–May 2016. The squad shock themselves as they work at their hardest with dissertation deadlines looming, but they each find pressure mainly coming from a different source - with only Jack getting enjoyment out of it. Corinne is perturbed by Danny's increasing aloofness and brusqueness, triggered by a fracturing relationship with family and denial of his grandmother's declining health. The storm clouds over their heads also find themselves over Shannon's, as she struggles to reconcile with her estranged, prickly mother on daughter Lauren's shared birthday/Eurovision party.
5	"Goodbye U-N-I"	Jim Archer	Jack Rooke	23 February 2025	N/A
Monumental ends are nigh for everyone, as they contemplate the end of their time at university and returning home - the drastically changed composition of which also lying with varied heaviness on their minds. Jack's focus moves primarily on deliberating whether to engage with former school classmates who have journeyed from homophobia to, in the years between, discovering they were projecting and gay themselves. Corinne utilises her struggles to put her inability to deal with Danny's silence towards her into completely restarting her dissertation, with the distraction bringing mixed results. Danny is devastated after his belief that his nan's passing could finally bring his disparate family back together is not realised; left alone to contemplate if he is responsible, but also what comes next - and if it is better for it to be uncertain or nonexistent.
6	"The Sea"	Jim Archer	Jack Rooke	23 February 2025	N/A
June–September 2016. Present-day Jack gifts Danny with a new ending - the one he deserved, and being able to witness and take part in everyone else's.

== Production ==
The show's commissioning was announced in November 2020, following a pilot that was shot around 2018.

The series is based on Rooke's comedy stage shows Good Grief, Happy Hour, and Love Letters. Rooke said that the series is semi-autobiographical; when asked "how truthful to his life" the show is, Rooke commented it was "[a]bout fifty-fifty".

== Reception ==
=== Viewership ===
Over the six episodes, the series averaged 410,000 viewers including catch-up within seven days post-broadcast. Including viewership prior to broadcast - through the series being made available in full on-demand on All4 following the broadcast of the first episode - and all viewership on devices aside from televisions (smartphones, laptops and tablets), the series averaged 669,000 viewers.

=== Critical reception ===
Big Boys has been critically praised. Carol Midgley in a four-star review for The Times, wrote that it is "one of the most funny, tender, profound sad-happy comedies I've seen this year and is worth anyone's time, not just because it tackles the themes of grief, coming of age and sexuality with a beautifully light touch, but because the cast give the impression that they love performing it."

Lucy Mangan writes in her four-star review for The Guardian; "[i]t is warm and funny, but with a melancholic undertow that fades in and out as the episode – and the series – goes on, but never disappears entirely", and that "[a]lthough it is gentler and less frenetic, Big Boys' combination of frankness, heart and wit – and the seriousness with which it treats young people and the problems they face – evokes the mighty Sex Education", but simultaneously, "Rooke makes it entirely its own thing – and one that can pierce your heart when you least expect it". She touches upon the relationship between Jack and Danny in the series, saying [t]he growing friendship between the two young men, in a genre and world when such things are seldom showcased or made part of the cultural narrative, is genuinely uplifting", and also praises Katy Wix's "tremendous turn".

In a further four-star review for The Telegraph, Anita Singh poses that "this bubbly sitcom ... is also a sensitively handled study of friendship and loss", and "[t]he heartfelt bits are skilfully woven around more standard comedy", with "plenty of laughs, but at its heart this is the story of a friendship that you dearly hope will work out". In comments also for The Telegraph, Victoria Coren Mitchell wrote that "[d]epicted well enough, as they are here, surely any viewer can relate to those feelings of social awkwardness, wrongness, outsiderism and embarrassment which characterise teenage existence and – for many of us – the rest of our lives as well" - recalling how she felt at university - and that the show "triggers tears in the eyes from both comedy and poignancy, which is very hard to do in a first series", comparing Jack Rooke's writing and lines to that Victoria Wood may have written, and "[w]e can't know how accurate a portrayal this is of Jack Rooke's actual life, but we can know he has a wonderful comic touch".

The show was included on The Guardian's list of "the best TV of 2022 so far" in June 2022, which lauded Jack Rooke as "TV's most exciting voice of 2022", and the series as "a perfectly written and performed ode to gay-straight male friendship". Later in the year, it ranked sixth in The Guardian's top 50 shows of 2022, with Hollie Richardson saying that when she finished watching the series: "I thought of all the men in my life I immediately wanted to implore to watch it. My initial hesitation about any awkwardness this might cause was proof that conversations around men's mental health still need to be normalised. But recommending this show to people is a gift – one I truly believe might change, maybe even save, some men's lives."

=== Accolades ===
Year	Award	Category	Nominee(s)	Result	Ref.
2022	Royal Television Society Craft & Design Awards	Director - Comedy Drama/Situation Comedy	Jim Archer	Nominated	
2023	Writers' Guild of Great Britain Awards	Best TV Situation Comedy	Jack Rooke	Won	
2023	Royal Television Society Programme Awards	Scripted Comedy	Big Boys	Nominated	
2023	Royal Television Society Programme Awards	Comedy Performance: Male	Jon Pointing	Nominated	
2023	Royal Television Society Programme Awards	Writer: Comedy	Jack Rooke	Nominated	
2023	British Academy Television Awards	Best Scripted Comedy	Jack Rooke, Jim Archer, Ash Atalla, Alex Smith, Bertie Peek	Nominated	
2023	British Academy Television Awards	Best Male Comedy Performance	Jon Pointing	Nominated	
2023	British Academy Television Craft Awards	Best Writer: Comedy	Jack Rooke	Nominated	
2023	British Academy Television Craft Awards	Best Emerging Talent: Fiction	Jack Rooke	Nominated	
2023	BAFTA Cymru	Best Actress	Katy Wix	Nominated	
2024	British Academy Television Awards	Best Scripted Comedy	Big Boys	Nominated	
2024	British Academy Television Craft Awards	Best Writer: Comedy	Jack Rooke	Won	
2026	British Academy Television Awards	Best Scripted Comedy	Big Boys	Nominated	
2026	British Academy Television Awards	Memorable Moment	Big Boys	Nominated	
2026	British Academy Television Awards	Best Male Comedy Performance	Jon Pointing	Nominated	
2026	British Academy Television Craft Awards	Best Writer: Comedy	Jack Rooke	Won	
