= Dylan Llewellyn =

English actor (born 1992)

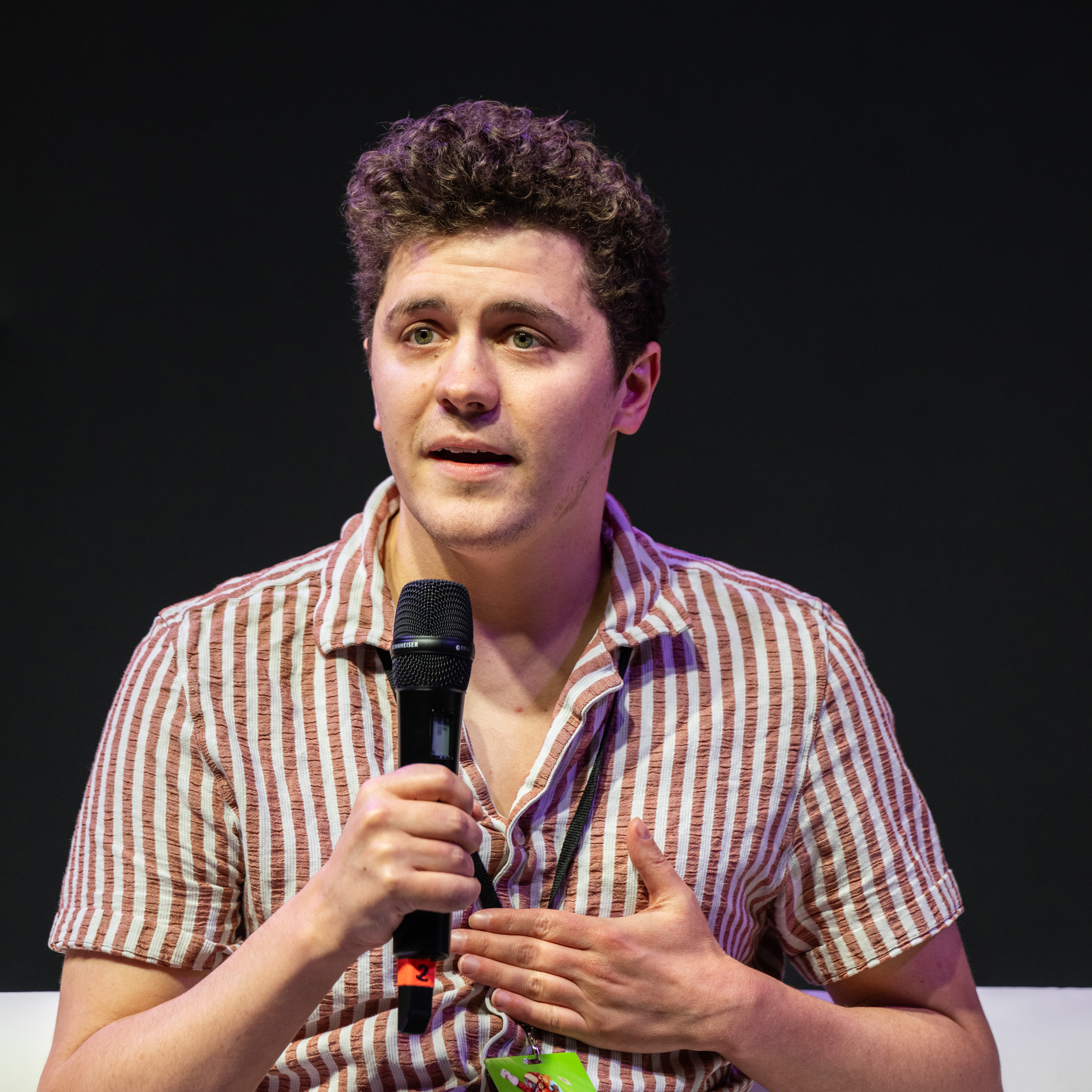
- At MCM London Comic Con, 23 May 2026
- Born: Dylan John Llewellyn; 10 September 1992 (age 34); Reigate, Surrey, England
- Occupation: Actor
- Years active: 2009–present

Dylan John Llewellyn (born 10 September 1992) is an English actor. He began his career in the Channel 4 soap opera Hollyoaks (2011–2012). He has since starred in the Channel 4 series Derry Girls (2018–2022) and Big Boys (2022–2025), the Disney+ series Pistol (2022) and the BBC One series Beyond Paradise (2023–present).

== Early life ==
Llewellyn was born and raised in Reigate, Surrey, the youngest of three boys born to English parents. He attended More House School in Farnham, a school for children with developmental and learning disorders. Llewellyn has dyslexia and found the support at a specialist school helpful. He studied media, photography, and drama at A-Level. Llewellyn attended RADA, where he did a foundation in acting.

== Career ==
Llewellyn appeared in the short film Travel Bag in 2009 and in 2010 he played Adam Wilcock in an episode of the television series The Bill. In 2011, Llewellyn began playing Martin "Jono" Johnson in the soap opera Hollyoaks and in the spin-off Hollyoaks Later. He made his last appearance in Hollyoaks on 16 November 2012 when his character was killed off. Since leaving Hollyoaks, Llewellyn has made appearances in Holby City (2013) and in the films Frequencies (2013) and Down Dog (2014). Llewellyn was struggling with acting jobs and was close to giving up acting whilst working part-time in a deli when he got the call that he was cast on Derry Girls.

From 2018 to 2022, Llewelyn played the role of James Maguire in the Channel 4 sitcom Derry Girls. In 2020, Llewellyn played Stewart Irmsby in an episode of series 9 of Call the Midwife. From 2022 to 2025, Llewellyn played main character Jack in the Channel 4 series Big Boys. Jack is a quiet teen who is coming to terms with both the death of his father and his own sexuality, a fictionalised version of creator Jack Rooke.

On 6 July 2018, Llewellyn appeared in an episode of the game show The Crystal Maze alongside his Derry Girls co-stars. On 1 January 2019, Llewellyn made a guest appearance on The Inbetweeners: Fwends Reunited. In March 2019, he made guest appearances on The One Show and Lorraine. On 31 December 2019, Llewellyn appeared in an episode of Celebrity Mastermind. On 1 January 2020, Llewellyn appeared in a Derry Girls edition of The Great British Bake Off.

On 26 June 2020, Llewellyn performed a sketch with his Derry Girls co-stars alongside Saoirse Ronan for the RTÉ fundraising special RTÉ Does Comic Relief. All proceeds from the night went towards those affected by the COVID-19 pandemic.

Since February 2023, he has starred as PC Kelby Hartford in Beyond Paradise, a spin-off of the hit show Death In Paradise. The show focuses on DI Humphrey Goodman, who has returned home to England as Detective Inspector in a small village in Devon.

== Personal life ==
Llewellyn lives near his hometown of Reigate.

During the filming of Race Across the World, Llewellyn and his mother revealed that he lost his 20-year-old brother James to suicide when he was 16.

== Filmography ==
=== Film ===
Year	Title	Role	Notes
2009	Travel Bag	Ricky	Short films
2010	Cubicle Two	Jake	Short films
2013	Frequencies	Teen Zak Midgeley	
2014	Down Dog	Sam	
2021	Finger Prick	Alexi	Short films
2022	Reavey Brothers	Anthony Reavey	Short films
2022	A Grand Romantic Gesture	Jeremy	
2024	10 Lives	Larry (voice)	

=== Television ===
Year	Title	Role	Notes
2010	The Bill	Adam Wilcock	Episode: "Keep Her Talking"
2011–2012	Hollyoaks	Martin "Jono" Johnson	94 episodes
2012	Hollyoaks Later	Martin "Jono" Johnson	5 episodes
2013	Holby City	Seb Channing	4 episodes
2018–2022	Derry Girls	James Maguire	Main role
2020	Call the Midwife	Stewart Irmsby	1 episode
2021	Dodo	Joe Connolly	20 episodes
2022	Pistol	Wally Nightingale	Main role
2022–2025	Big Boys	Jack	Main role
2023–present	Beyond Paradise	PC Kelby Hartford	Main role
2025	Celebrity Race Across the World	Himself	With his mum, Jackie

=== Theatre ===
Year	Title	Role	Venue	Notes
2009	A Handbag	Specs	Royal National Theatre, London	
2013	The Fastest Clock in the Universe	Foxtrot Darling	Old Red Lion Theatre, London	
2014	War Horse	Billy	New London Theatre, London & Royal National Theatre, London	
2015	Lord of the Flies	Henry	Regent's Park Open Air Theatre, London	also, UK Tour
