= British Academy Television Craft Award for Best Writer: Comedy =

British award for comedy writing

British Academy Television Craft Award
- Country: United Kingdom
- Presented by: British Academy of Film and Television Arts
- First award: 2013
- Currently held by: Jack Rooke for Big Boys (2026)
- Website: http://www.bafta.org/

The British Academy Television Craft Award for Best Writer: Comedy is one of the categories presented by the British Academy of Film and Television Arts (BAFTA) within the British Academy Television Craft Awards, the craft awards were established in 2000 with their own, separate ceremony as a way to spotlight technical achievements, without being overshadowed by the main production categories.

Prior to 2013, there was a united category named Best Writer for both drama and comedy series, in 2013 this category was split into two separate categories, Writer: Drama and Writer: Comedy.

== Winners and nominees ==
=== 2010s ===
Year	Recipient(s)	Title	Broadcaster
2013	Julia Davis	Hunderby	Sky Atlantic
2013	Jo Brand, Joanna Scanlan, Vicki Pepperdine	Getting On	BBC Four
2013	Writing Team	The Thick of It	BBC Two
2013	John Morton	Twenty Twelve	BBC Two
2014	Graham Linehan	The IT Crowd	BBC Two
2014	Sam Bain, Jesse Armstrong, Tom Basden	Fresh Meat	Channel 4
2014	Steve Delaney, Graham Linehan	Count Arthur Strong	BBC Two
2014	James Corden, Mathew Baynton	The Wrong Mans	BBC Two
2015	Mackenzie Crook	Detectorists	BBC Four
2015	Reece Shearsmith, Steve Pemberton	Inside No. 9	BBC Two
2015	James Corden, Mathew Baynton	The Wrong Mans (for "Episode 1")	BBC Two
2015	Arthur Mathews, Matt Berry	Toast of London	Channel 4
2016	Rob Delaney, Sharon Horgan	Catastrophe	Channel 4
2016	Jesse Armstrong, Sam Bain	Peep Show	Channel 4
2016	Julia Davis, Barunka O'Shaughnessy	Hunderby	Sky Atlantic
2016	Writing Team	Peter Kay's Car Share	BBC One
2017	Stefan Golaszewski	Mum	BBC Two
2017	Julia Davis	Camping	Sky Atlantic
2017	Steve Coogan, Neil Gibbons, Rob Gibbons	Alan Partridge's Scissored Isle	Sky Atlantic
2017	Phoebe Waller-Bridge	Fleabag	BBC Three
2018	Steve Pemberton, Reece Shearsmith	Inside No. 9	BBC Two
2018	Daisy May Cooper, Charlie Cooper	This Country	BBC Three
2018	Paul Coleman, Peter Kay, Sian Gibson	Peter Kay's Car Share	BBC One
2018	Sharon Horgan, Rob Delaney	Catastrophe	Channel 4
2019	Daisy May Cooper, Charlie Cooper	This Country	BBC Three
2019	Peter Kay, Sian Gibson, Paul Coleman	Peter Kay's Car Share: The Finale	BBC One
2019	Stefan Golaszewski	Mum	BBC Two
2019	Writing Team	Cunk on Britain	BBC Two

=== 2020s ===
Year	Recipient(s)	Title	Broadcaster
2020	Jamie Demetriou	Stath Lets Flats	Channel 4
2020	Danny Brocklehurst	Brassic	Sky 1
2020	Phoebe Waller-Bridge	Fleabag	BBC Three
2020	Sam Leifer, Tom Basden	Plebs	ITV2
2021	Sophie Willan	Alma's Not Normal	BBC Two
2021	Writing Team	Ghosts	BBC One
2021	Charlie Brooker	Charlie Brooker's Antiviral Wipe	BBC Two
2021	Daisy May Cooper and Charlie Cooper	This Country	BBC Three
2022	Nida Manzoor	We Are Lady Parts	Channel 4
2022	Nathan Bryon, Paul Doolan	Bloods	Sky One
2022	Stephen Merchant, Emma Jane Unsworth	The Outlaws	BBC One
2022	Sophie Willan	Alma's Not Normal	BBC Two
2023	Lisa McGee	Derry Girls	Channel 4
2023	Nancy Harris	The Dry	Britbox
2023	Jack Rooke	Big Boys	Channel 4
2023	Sharon Horgan, Barunka O'Shaughnessy, Helen Serafinowicz, Holly Walsh	Motherland	BBC One
2024	Jack Rooke	Big Boys	Channel 4
2024	Jamie Demetriou	A Whole Lifetime with Jamie Demetriou	Netflix
2024	Kat Sadler	Such Brave Girls	BBC Three
2024	Mawaan Rizwan	Juice	BBC Three
2025	Reece Shearsmith, Steve Pemberton	Inside No. 9	BBC Two
2025	Brett Goldstein	Shrinking	Apple TV+
2025	Phil Dunning	Smoggie Queens	BBC Three
2025	Nida Manzoor	We Are Lady Parts	Channel 4
2026	Jack Rooke	Big Boys	Channel 4
2026	Daisy May Cooper, Selin Hizli	Am I Being Unreasonable?	BBC One
2026	Steve Coogan, Rob Gibbons, Neil Gibbons	How Are You? It's Alan (Partridge)	BBC One
2026	Kat Sadler	Such Brave Girls	BBC Three

== See also ==
- British Academy Television Craft Award for Best Writer: Drama
- Primetime Emmy Award for Outstanding Writing for a Comedy Series
