= British Academy Television Award for Best Scripted Comedy =

Television award

British Academy Television Award
- Country: United Kingdom
- Presented by: British Academy of Film and Television Arts
- First award: 1973
- Currently held by: Amandaland (2026)

Highlights
- Most wins: The Office (3)
- Website: http://www.bafta.org/

The British Academy Television Award for Best Scripted Comedy is awarded annually as part of the British Academy Television Awards. Until 2015, the category was named the British Academy Television Award for Best Situation Comedy. According to British Academy of Film and Television Arts, the category "covers both situational comedies and scripted comedy sketch shows".

It was first awarded from 1973 to 1980. From 1981 to 1999, sitcoms were included in the Best Comedy Programme or Series category instead. The category returned in 2000.

== Winners and nominees ==
=== 1973-1980 ===
Year	Title	Recipient(s)	Broadcaster
1973	My Wife Next Door	Graeme Muir	BBC One
1973	Dad's Army	David Croft	BBC One
1973	Till Death Us Do Part	Dennis Main Wilson	BBC One
1974	Whatever Happened to the Likely Lads?	James Gilbert	BBC One
1974	Dad's Army	David Croft	BBC One
1974	Last of the Summer Wine	James Gilbert	BBC One
1974	Some Mothers Do 'Ave 'Em	Michael Mills	BBC One
1975	Porridge	Sydney Lotterby	BBC One
1975	Dad's Army	David Croft	BBC One
1975	Whatever Happened to the Likely Lads?	Bernard Thompson	BBC One
1975	Some Mothers Do 'Ave 'Em	Michael Mills	BBC One
1976	Fawlty Towers	John Howard Davies	BBC Two
1976	Some Mothers Do 'Ave 'Em	Michael Mills	BBC One
1976	Porridge	Sydney Lotterby	BBC One
1976	The Good Life	John Howard Davies	BBC One
1977	Porridge (Special)	Sydney Lotterby	BBC One
1977	The Good Life	John Howard Davies	BBC One
1977	Are You Being Served?	David Croft	BBC One
1977	The Fall and Rise of Reginald Perrin	Gareth Gwenlan	BBC One
1977	Two's Company	John Reardon	ITV
1978	Rising Damp	Ronnie Baxter	ITV
1978	The Good Life	John Howard Davies	BBC One
1978	The Fall and Rise of Reginald Perrin	Gareth Gwenlan	BBC One
1978	Porridge	Sydney Lotterby	BBC One
1979	Going Straight	Sydney Lotterby	BBC One
1979	The Fall and Rise of Reginald Perrin	Gareth Gwenlan	BBC One
1979	Two's Company	Humphrey Barclay, John Reardon	ITV
1979	Rising Damp	Vernon Lawrence	ITV
1980	Fawlty Towers	Douglas Argent, Bob Spiers	BBC Two
1980	Last of the Summer Wine	Sydney Lotterby	BBC One
1980	The Fall and Rise of Reginald Perrin	Gareth Gwenlan	BBC One
1980	To the Manor Born	Gareth Gwenlan	BBC One

=== 2000s ===
Year	Title	Recipient(s)	Broadcaster
2000	The Royle Family (series 2)	Kenton Allen, Caroline Aherne, Craig Cash	BBC One
2000	Spaced (series 1)	Gareth Edwards, Nira Park, Edgar Wright	Channel 4
2000	Dinnerladies (series 2)	Geoff Posner, Victoria Wood	BBC One
2000	The Vicar of Dibley (1999 Seasonal Specials)		BBC One
2001	Black Books (series 1)	Nira Park, Graham Linehan, Dylan Moran	Channel 4
2001	Blackadder (Series Finale: Blackadder: Back & Forth)	Peter Bennett-Jones, Sophie Clarke-Jervoise, Paul Weiland	BBC One Sky1
2001	One Foot in the Grave (series 6)	Jonathan P. Llewellyn, Christine Gernon, David Renwick	BBC One
2001	The Royle Family (series 3)	Kenton Allen, Caroline Aherne, Craig Cash	BBC One
2002	The Office (series 1)	Anil Gupta, Ash Atalla, Ricky Gervais, Stephen Merchant	BBC Two
2002	Gimme Gimme Gimme (series 3)	Francis Matthews, Tristram Shapeero, Jonathan Harvey	BBC One
2002	Happiness (series 1)	David Cummings, Declan Lowney, Rosemary McGowan, Paul Whitehouse	BBC Two
2002	Spaced (series 2)	Nira Park, Edgar Wright, Jessica Stevenson, Simon Pegg	Channel 4
2003	The Office (series 2)	Ash Atalla, Anil Gupta, Ricky Gervais, Stephen Merchant	BBC Two
2003	The Book Group (series 1)	Annie Griffin, Anita Overland	Channel 4
2003	Phoenix Nights (series 2)	Peter Kay, Henry Klejdys, Phil McIntyre	Channel 4
2003	My Family (series 3)		BBC One
2004	The Office (The Office Christmas Specials)	Ash Atalla, Ricky Gervais, Stephen Merchant	BBC One
2004	Hardware (series 1)	Margot Gavan Duffy, Ben Kellett, Simon Nye	ITV
2004	Marion and Geoff (series 2)	Hugo Blick, Rob Brydon, Henry Normal	BBC Two
2004	Peep Show (series 1)	Phil Clarke, Andrew O'Connor	Channel 4
2005	Black Books (series 3)	Nira Park, Martin Dennis, Dylan Moran	Channel 4
2005	Nighty Night (series 2)		BBC Three
2005	Green Wing (series 1)	Victoria Pile, Tristram Shapeero, Dominic Brigstocke	Channel 4
2005	The Vicar of Dibley (Christmas Specials: A Very Dibley Christmas)		BBC One
2006	The Thick of It		BBC Four
2006	Extras (series 1)	Charlie Hanson, Ricky Gervais, Stephen Merchant	BBC Two
2006	Peep Show (series 3)	Robert Popper, Tristram Shapeero, Sam Bain, Jesse Armstrong	Channel 4
2006	The Worst Week of My Life (series 2)	Mario Stylianides, Mark Bussell, Justin Sbresni	BBC One
2007	The Royle Family (Special: The Queen of Sheba)	Caroline Aherne, Craig Cash, John Rushton, Phil Mealey	BBC One
2007	Green Wing (series 2)	Victoria Pile, Dominic Brigstocke, Tristram Shapeero, Robert Harley	Channel 4
2007	The IT Crowd (series 1)	Ash Atalla, Graham Linehan, Derrin Schlesinger, Lorraine Heggessey	Channel 4
2007	Pulling (series 1)	Sharon Horgan, Dennis Kelly, Phil Bowker, Tristram Shapeero	BBC Three
2008	Peep Show (series 4)	Sam Bain, Jesse Armstrong, Robert Popper, Becky Martin	Channel 4
2008	Benidorm (series 1)	Derren Litten, Kevin Allen, Geoffrey Perkins	ITV
2008	The IT Crowd (series 2)	Graham Linehan, Ash Atalla, Jamie Glazebrook, Barbara Wiltshire	Channel 4
2008	The Thick of It (2007 Specials: The Rise of the Nutters & Spinners and Losers)		BBC Four
2009	The IT Crowd (series 3)	Graham Linehan, Richard Boden, Ash Atalla	Channel 4
2009	The Inbetweeners (series 1)		E4
2009	Outnumbered (series 2)	Andy Hamilton, Guy Jenkin	BBC One
2009	Peep Show (series 5)	Sam Bain, Jesse Armstrong, Becky Martin, Izzy Mant	Channel 4

=== 2010s ===
Year	Title	Recipient(s)	Broadcaster
2010	The Thick of It (series 3)	Armando Iannucci, Adam Tandy	BBC Two
2010	The Inbetweeners (series 2)	Damon Beesley, Iain Morris, Ben Palmer, Christopher Young	E4
2010	Miranda (series 1)	Jo Sargent, Nerys Evans, Juliet May, Miranda Hart	BBC One
2010	Peep Show (series 6)	Sam Bain, Jesse Armstrong, Phil Clarke, Becky Martin	Channel 4
2011	Rev. (series 1)		BBC Two
2011	Mrs. Brown's Boys (series 1)	Stephen McCrum, Martin Delany, Ben Kellett, Brendan O'Carroll	BBC One
2011	Peep Show (series 7)	Phil Clarke, Becky Martin, Sam Bain, Jesse Armstrong	Channel 4
2011	The Trip (series 1)	Steve Coogan, Rob Brydon, Michael Winterbottom	BBC Two
2012	Mrs. Brown's Boys (series 2)	Martin Delaney, Ben Kellett, Stephen McCrum, Brendan O'Carroll	BBC One
2012	Fresh Meat (series 1)	Jesse Armstrong, Sam Bain, Judy Counihan, Rhonda Smith	E4
2012	Friday Night Dinner (series 1)	Kenton Allen, Steve Bendelack, Caroline Leddy, Robert Popper	Channel 4
2012	Rev. (series 2)		BBC Two
2013	Twenty Twelve (series 2)	John Morton, Paul Schlesinger, Catherine Gosling Fuller, Jon Plowman	BBC Two
2013	Episodes (series 2)	David Crane, Jeffrey Klarik, Jimmy Mulville	BBC Two
2013	Hunderby (series 1)	Julia Davis, Tony Dow, John Rushton	Sky Atlantic
2013	The Thick of It (series 4)	Armando Iannucci, Adam Tandy	BBC Two
2014	Him & Her (series 4: The Wedding)	Kenton Allen, Stefan Golaszewski, Lyndsay Robinson, Richard Laxton	BBC Three
2014	Count Arthur Strong (series 1)	Steve Delaney, Graham Linehan, Richard Boden	BBC Two
2014	The IT Crowd (Finale Special: The Internet is Coming)	Graham Linehan, Richard Boden	Channel 4
2014	Toast of London (series 1)	Kate Daughton, Arthur Mathews, Matt Berry, Michael Cumming	Channel 4
2015	Detectorists (series 1)	Mackenzie Crook, Adam Tandy	BBC Four
2015	Harry & Paul (Special: Harry & Paul's Story of the Twos)	Harry Enfield, Paul Whitehouse, Ed Bye, Bradley Adams	BBC Two
2015	Moone Boy (series 2)	Chris O’Dowd, Nick Vincent Murphy, Ted Dowd, Ian Fitzgibbon	Sky1
2015	The Wrong Mans (series 2)	Jim Field Smith, Mathew Baynton, James Corden, Mark Freeland	BBC Two
2016	Peter Kay's Car Share (series 1)	Peter Kay, Gill Isles, Sian Gibson, Paul Coleman	BBC One
2016	Chewing Gum (series 1)		E4
2016	Peep Show (series 9)	Jesse Armstrong, Sam Bain, Becky Martin, Hannah Mackay	Channel 4
2016	People Just Do Nothing (series 2)		BBC Three
2017	People Just Do Nothing (series 3)		BBC Three
2017	Camping (series 1)	Julia Davis, Ted Dowd	Sky Atlantic
2017	Fleabag (series 1)		BBC Three
2017	Flowers (series 2)	Will Sharpe, Naomi de Pear, Diederick Santer, Jane Featherstone	Channel 4
2018	This Country (series 1)	Daisy May Cooper, Charlie Cooper, Tom George, Simon Mayhew-Archer	BBC Three
2018	Catastrophe (series 3)	Sharon Horgan, Rob Delaney, Ben Taylor, Jack Bayles	Channel 4
2018	Chewing Gum (series 2)		E4
2018	Timewasters (series 1)	Daniel Lawrence Taylor, Barunka O'Shaughnessy, Josh Cole, George Kane	ITV2
2019	Sally4ever		Sky Atlantic
2019	Mum (series 2)	Stefan Golaszewski, Richard Laxton, Kenton Allen, Georgie Fallon	BBC Two
2019	Derry Girls (series 1)	Lisa McGee, Michael Lennox, Caroline Leddy, Liz Lewin	Channel 4
2019	Stath Lets Flats (series 1)		Channel 4

=== 2020s ===
Year	Title	Recipient(s)	Broadcaster
2020	Stath Lets Flats (series 2)	Jamie Demetriou, Tom Kingsley, Seb Barwell, Ash Atalla	Channel 4
2020	Fleabag (series 2)		BBC Three
2020	Catastrophe (series 4)	Sharon Horgan, Rob Delaney, Jim O'Hanlon, Toby Welch	Channel 4
2020	Derry Girls (series 2)	Lisa McGee, Liz Lewin, Caroline Leddy, Michael Lennox	Channel 4
2021
2021	Inside No. 9 (series 5)	Adam Tandy, Steve Pemberton, Reece Shearsmith, Matt Lipsey, Guillem Morales	BBC Two
2021	Ghosts (series 2)		BBC One
2021	Man Like Mobeen (series 3)		BBC Three
2021	This Country (series 3)	Daisy May Cooper, Charlie Cooper, Tom George, Simon Mayhew-Archer	BBC Three
2022
2022	Motherland (series 3)	Holly Walsh, Helen Serafinowicz, Barunka O'Shaughnessy, Caroline Norris, Sharon Horgan, Clelia Mountford, Simon Hynd	BBC Two
2022	We Are Lady Parts (series 1)		Channel 4
2022	Stath Lets Flats (series 3)	Jamie Demetriou, Seb Barwell, Andrew Gaynord, Ash Atalla	Channel 4
2022	Alma's Not Normal (series 1)	Sophie Willan, Gill Isles, Andrew Chaplin, Nerys Evans	BBC Two
2023
2023	Derry Girls (series 3)	Lisa McGee, Liz Lewin, Caroline Leddy, Michael Lennox, Brian J. Falconer, Jessica Sharkey	Channel 4
2023	Am I Being Unreasonable? (series 1)	Daisy May Cooper, Selin Hizli, Jonny Campbell, Pippa Brown, Jack Thorne	BBC One
2023	Ghosts (series 4)		BBC One
2023	Big Boys (series 1)	Jack Rooke, Jim Archer, Ash Atalla, Alex Smith, Bertie Peek	Channel 4
2024	Such Brave Girls (series 1)	Kat Sadler, Simon Bird, Catherine Gosling Fuller, Jack Bayles, Phil Clarke	BBC Three
2024	Dreaming Whilst Black (series 1)	Thomas Stogdon, Dhanny Joshi, Adjani Salmon, Ali Hughes, Nicola Gregory, Yemi Oyefuwa	BBC Three
2024	Big Boys (series 2)	Jack Rooke, Jim Archer, Bertie Peek, Ash Atalla, Alex Smith	Channel 4
2024	Extraordinary (series 1)	Emma Moran, Toby Macdonald, Sally Woodward Gentle, Lee Morris, Charlie Palmer, Jennifer Sheridan	Disney+
2025	Alma's Not Normal (series 2)	Sophie Willan, Andrew Chaplin, Gill Isles, Nerys Evans	BBC Two
2025	Brassic (series 6)	David Livingstone, Danny Brocklehurst, Ben Gregor, Joseph Gilgun, Jim Poyser	Sky Max
2025	G'wed (series 1)	Danny Kenny, Mario Stylianides, Akaash Meeda, Penny Davies	ITV2
2025	Ludwig (series 1)	Mark Brotherhood, Robert McKillop, David Mitchell, Kenton Allen, Kathryn O'Connor, Georgie Fallon	BBC One
2026	Amandaland (series 1)		BBC One
2026	Big Boys (series 3)	Jack Rooke, Bertie Peek, Jim Archer, Ash Atalla, Alex Smith, Tim Sealey	Channel 4
2026	How Are You? It's Alan (Partridge)	Steve Coogan, Rob Gibbons, Neil Gibbons, Joe Fraser, Rupert Majendie, Sarah Monteith	BBC One
2026	Things You Should Have Done (series 2)	Lucia Keskin, Jack Clough, Steve Monger, Ash Atalla, Alex Smith	BBC Three

- Note: The series that don't have recipients on the tables had Production team credited as recipients for the award or nomination.

== Programmes with multiple wins and nominations ==
=== Multiple Awards ===
3 awards

- The Office (consecutive)

2 awards

- Black Books
- Fawlty Towers
- Porridge
- The Royle Family
- The Thick of It

=== Multiple Nominations ===
7 nominations

- Peep Show

4 nominations

- The IT Crowd
- Porridge
- The Thick of It

3 nominations

- Big Boys
- Derry Girls
- The Office
- The Royle Family
- Stath Lets Flats

2 nominations

- Alma's Not Normal
- Black Books
- Catastrophe
- Chewing Gum
- Fleabag
- Ghosts
- Green Wing
- The Inbetweeners
- Mrs. Brown's Boys
- People Just Do Nothing
- Rev.
- Spaced
- The Vicar of Dibley
