= 10 Lives =

2024 film directed by Chris Jenkins

- Theatrical release poster
- Directed by: Chris Jenkins
- Screenplay by: Chris Jenkins; Karen Wengrod; Ken Cinnamon
- Story by: Karen Wengrod; Ken Cinnamon; Ash Brannon; Ernesto Matamoros; Leland Cox
- Produced by: Adrian Politowski; Martin Metz; Guy Collins; Sean Feeney; Valerie d'Auteuil; Andre Rouleau; Yann Zenou
- Starring: Mo Gilligan; Simone Ashley; Sophie Okonedo; Zayn Malik; Dylan Llewellyn; Jeremy Swift; Tabitha Cross; Bill Nighy
- Cinematography: Olaf Skjenna (layout)
- Edited by: Mirenda Ouellet
- Music by: Tom Howe; Geoff Zanelli
- Production companies: GFM Animation; Align; Caramel Films; L'Atelier Animation
- Distributed by: Sky Cinema NOW (United Kingdom and Ireland); KMBO (France); Angel (United States)
- Release dates: January 20, 2024 (Sundance); April 5, 2024 (United Kingdom)
- Running time: 88 minutes
- Countries: United Kingdom; Canada; France; United States
- Language: English
- Budget: $26 million
- Box office: $17.2 million

10 Lives is a 2024 animated fantasy comedy film directed by Chris Jenkins from a screenplay by Jenkins, Karen Wengrod and Ken Cinnamon. It was co-produced by Canada, United Kingdom, France and United States. The film features the voices of Mo Gilligan, Simone Ashley, Sophie Okonedo, Zayn Malik, Dylan Llewellyn, Jeremy Swift, Tabitha Cross and Bill Nighy. The film is about a pampered housecat Beckett (Gilligan) — who totally takes for granted the lucky hand he has been dealt; loved and rescued by Rose, a kind-hearted and passionate student focused on saving the world's bee population — during and after his ninth life.

10 Lives had its world premiere on January 20, 2024, at the Sundance Film Festival, Park City, Utah. In the United Kingdom, the film was labeled as a Sky Original, where it became available to watch on Sky Cinema and NOW on April 5, 2024.

== Plot ==
As a kitten, Beckett is adopted by Rose, a student specialised in bees. Later, Rose receives the visit of Larry, her ex-boyfriend, who helps her find a solution to the problem of the recent death of numerous bees. Beckett is jealous and tries to make Larry leave the house but the cat loses his ninth life. Beckett pleads Grace, responsible for the afterlife of animals, to be allowed to return to his former life: the Gatekeeper allows him to return to earth with a new set of lives, but in a variety of different forms: badger, rat, cockroach, parrot, dog, fish and horse.

Meanwhile, Professor Craven, Rose's lab director, tries to sabotage her studies so that he can sell his drone-bees universally. He repeatedly sends two thugs to destroy her bees and replace her vaccine samples. Eventually he sets a public presentation, during which he hopes Rose will prove her research was led in vain. But, this time as a bee, and subsequently as himself, Beckett manages to make Craven's evil intentions clear and save the bees. He saves Rose, attacked by drone-bees, from drowning but loses his last life and is sent to Heaven.

Years pass and Beckett appears to eventually come back as a kitten, to be adopted by Larry and Rose's young daughter named Beatrice.

== Cast ==
- Mo Gilligan as Beckett, a pampered and selfish housecat. His fur is entirely gray and white and he has heterochromia, with one yellow eye and one blue eye. He is rescued and loved by Rose. After losing his last life he gets nine new ones as different animals.
- Simone Ashley as Rose Shukla, a kind-hearted and passionate student.
- Sophie Okonedo as Grace, an ethereal, no-nonsense woman with the power to grant Beckett the cat his new lives.
- Bill Nighy as Professor Richard Craven, Rose's superior and the main antagonist.
- Dylan Llewellyn as Larry Llewellyn, Rose's socially discomfited lab partner.
- Zayn Malik as Kirk and Cameron, a bee pair of tough-acting twins.
- Jeremy Swift as Happy, a wisecracking American Pit Bull Terrier.
- Tabitha Cross as Beatrice Ashley

== Production ==
10 Lives was produced by GFM Animation, a London-based production company that acquired the project from Original Force, a Chinese animation studio. The film was also co-produced by L’Atelier Animation (a Canada-Based animation company), The Happy Producers, Align, Quad and Caramel Films.

In October 2022, it was announced that Zayn Malik, Simone Ashley, Mo Gilligan, Sophie Okonedo and Dylan Llewellyn would star in the film. Later in January 2023, Bill Nighy and Jeremy Swift joined the cast of the film. This was the first feature film speaking role for Zayn Malik.

== Release ==
The film had its world premiere on January 20, 2024, in the Sundance Film Festival, Park City, Utah. For the premiere, the film's cats are seen at a stage, in front of the film festival.

In the United Kingdom, the film was distributed as a Sky Original. It was released on April 5, 2024 and it is available to watch on Sky Cinema and Sky's streaming service NOW.

In May 2024, Briarcliff Entertainment acquired the North American distribution rights to the film. It was originally scheduled to be released theaters in the United States on October 11, 2024. However, a month before release, the studio silently took it off the schedule, replacing it with The Apprentice. In March 2026, Angel Studios quietly released the film on their streaming platform in the United States.

== Reception ==
On the review aggregator website Rotten Tomatoes, 62% of 13 critics' reviews are positive.

A review at Common Sense Media concluded, "The movie is sweet, funny, and warm, although it has tearjerker moments that might upset younger kids." A review in Deadline offered a similar appraisal of the production. Screen Daily was also positive about the film, writing "Yet what stands out is how, even after all these years in the business, Jenkins clearly has still has the spirit of fun and storytelling aimed at small children and that's the loveliest thing of all. Modest though this film may be, it's a genial achievement."
