= Chewing Gum (TV series) =

Television series

- Genre: Sitcom; Sex comedy; Cringe comedy
- Created by: Michaela Coel
- Based on: Chewing Gum Dreams by Michaela Coel
- Written by: Michaela Coel
- Directed by: Tom Marshall; Simon Neal
- Starring: Michaela Coel; Shola Adewusi; Tanya Franks; Sarah Hoare; Kadiff Kirwan; Robert Lonsdale; John MacMillan; Olisa Odele; Abby Rakic-Platt; Maggie Steed; Danielle Walters; Susan Wokoma
- Theme music composer: Shakka Philip; Michaela Coel
- Country of origin: United Kingdom
- Original language: English
- No. of series: 2
- No. of episodes: 12

Production
- Executive producers: Jon Rolph; Nana Hughes
- Producer: Kelly McGolpin
- Editor: Gavin Buckley
- Running time: 25 minutes
- Production company: Retort

Original release
- Network: E4
- Release: 6 October 2015 – 9 February 2017

Chewing Gum is a British television sitcom created and written by Michaela Coel, based on her 2012 play Chewing Gum Dreams. It stars Coel as 24-year-old shop assistant Tracey Gordon, a restricted, religious virgin, who wants to have sex and learn more about the world. The show earned Coel the BAFTA for Best Female Performance in a Comedy Programme and Breakthrough Talent.

The first series debuted on E4 on 13 October 2015 and on Netflix in the United States on 31 October 2016. The series was removed from Netflix in April 2020 and became available on HBO Max in February 2021. It has since been removed from HBO Max and is available for purchase on Prime Video.

== Background ==
In August 2014, Channel 4 announced that Coel was to star in and write a new sitcom called Chewing Gum, inspired by her play Chewing Gum Dreams. "C4 Comedy Blaps" were released as teasers in September 2014, and the series began on E4 in October 2015. Her performance earned her the British Academy Television Award for Best Female Comedy Performance in 2016; she also won a BAFTA for Breakthrough Talent for writing the show. Chewing Gum received overwhelmingly positive reviews.

Series one premiered on 6 October 2015 until 10 November 2015. On 3 December 2015, E4 ordered a second series; it began broadcasting on 12 January 2017.

In April 2017, it was announced by Channel 4 that the show would not be returning for a third series. However, in November 2017, Coel stated via Twitter that she intended to create a third series at some point in the future. In November 2018, Coel made another statement via Twitter confirming that the show wouldn't return for a third series.

Filming locations have included West London Film Studios and the Andover Estate in Holloway, North London.

== Cast ==
- Michaela Coel as Tracey Gordon
- Danielle Walters as Candice, Tracey's best friend
- Robert Lonsdale as Connor Jones
- John MacMillan as Ronald, Tracey's boyfriend for six years
- Tanya Franks as Mandy, Connor's mother
- Kadiff Kirwan as Aaron, Candice's boyfriend
- Susan Wokoma as Cynthia, Tracey's naive sister
- Shola Adewusi as Joy, Tracey and Cynthia's religious mother
- Maggie Steed as Esther, Candice's grandmother
- Olisa Odele as Ola
- Sarah Hoare as Karly Raven
- Abby Rakic-Platt as Kristy Raven

=== Guest ===
- Cynthia Erivo as Magdalene (series 1)
- Jonathan Bailey as Ash (series 2)
- Vera Chok as Penelope (series 2)
- Josef Altin as Ryan (series 2)
- Danny Sapani as Marlon (series 2)

== Episodes ==
Series	Episodes	Originally released	
Series	Episodes	First released	Last released
1	6	6 October 2015	10 November 2015
2	6	12 January 2017	9 February 2017

=== Series 1 (2015) ===
No. overall	No. in series	Title	Directed by	Written by	Original release date
1	1	"Sex and Violence"	Tom Marshall	Michaela Coel	6 October 2015
In hope of not becoming her uptight younger sister, Cynthia, Tracey becomes determined to lose her virginity to Ronald, her strictly religious boyfriend of six years. Following a Beyoncé-inspired makeover by her best friend Candice, Tracey goes on a venture to seduce Ronald, but when street poet Connor catches her eye, emotions become mixed, especially when she meets him at a party.
2	2	"Binned"	Tom Marshall	Michaela Coel	13 October 2015
Connor is Tracey's goal now, and she wants to bin Ronald to fulfill her relationship needs. She runs into Connor's mother, Mandy, and is given some off-putting information about his history in romance. However, once she visits Ronald, who is recovering from a car accident, she sees the light when all he can think about is the male nurse aiding him.
3	3	"Possession"	Tom Marshall	Michaela Coel	20 October 2015
During a shift at the shop, Tracey is able to grab a chance to improve her future in a recruitment day. When it turns sour, a member of staff tries to make a deal she might regret. Meanwhile, Cynthia covers Tracey's shift in the shop while she is gone and Candice and her Nan, Esther, attempt to make some money hosting a party selling sex-toys.
4	4	"The Unicorn"	Tom Marshall	Michaela Coel	27 October 2015
Connor and Tracey are having some problems in the bedroom. In order to save what they have, Tracey tries to get advice from her friends but comes across a new app and plans to hold a threesome with a "Unicorn" known as Sacha. Back at home, Cynthia is using Tracey's laptop for some sex-related research but soon is introduced to desperate and strange Seb.
5	5	"The Last Supper"	Tom Marshall	Michaela Coel	3 November 2015
Tracey thinks she can expose Connor's hidden talent in a show for performance poetry, but it goes terribly wrong. Also, Tracey's cousin, Boy Tracey, comes over to visit and gives her a prize she was never expecting to have to face. Cynthia has a life-changing secret to tell her family.
6	6	"Toiled Road"	Tom Marshall	Michaela Coel	10 November 2015
Tracey is kicked out by her mum and is left to move into Candice's house, but is soon driving her crazy. Connor finally gets a job in hope that Tracey will eventually move in with him. It's also the wedding day of Cynthia and Ronald; Tracey must figure out a way to expose Ronald's homosexual feelings and stop her sister from making a terrible mistake.

=== Series 2 (2017) ===
No. overall	No. in series	Title	Directed by	Written by	Original release date
1	7	"WTF Happened?"	Tom Marshall & Simon Neal	Michaela Coel	12 January 2017
After three months away, including time in a homeless shelter, Tracey returns to run Deepak's corner shop in his absence. Connor comes in to do repair work and, learning that he has a new girlfriend, Tracey attempts to make him jealous by claiming to be dating famous grime rapper Stormzy.
2	8	"Replacements"	Simon Neal	Michaela Coel	19 January 2017
Tracey is busy replacing Connor and Candice with new dates and friends, but her mum sets her some challenging tests before she can move back into the family home.
3	9	"Just Need Some Company"	Simon Neal & Tom Marshall	Michaela Coel & Rob Hayes	26 January 2017
In need of some male company, Tracey agrees to go to a party along with Boy Tracy in an attempt to find someone who thinks she's attractive. Chaos ensues when Tracey, Boy Tracy, Candice, and Aaron end up at a sex club.
4	10	"Orlando"	Simon Neal	Michaela Coel	2 February 2017
Tracey is tired of spending time with Connor and his new girlfriend. Cynthia demands an apology from Ronald. Esther gets mistaken for Candice when she sets up a date with a guy she met online. Tracey befriends local dog Orlando.
5	11	"Road Trip"	Simon Neal	Michaela Coel	9 February 2017
Tracey and Ola crash Aaron and Candice's "meet the parents" weekend. Candice is fed up of Aaron not being man enough for her. Ola meets some new and exciting people. Meanwhile, Cynthia finally has her sexual awakening.
6	12	"Age Ain't Nothing but a Number"	Simon Neal	Michaela Coel	9 February 2017
Now more desperate than ever to lose her virginity, Tracey joins a book club in the hope that she will meet men different from the type she usually goes for, yet as usual not all goes to plan. Karly's due in labour any time now, and the estate pull together to find out who the father is.

== Reception ==
=== Critical response ===
The series received critical acclaim upon its release. On review aggregator Rotten Tomatoes, the first season holds an approval rating of 100%, based on 14 reviews, with an average rating of 9/10. The website's critics consensus reads, "Deftly juggling its Christian convictions and crude intentions, Chewing Gum is balanced by a brazen performance from series creator Michaela Coel." Filipa Jodelka from The Guardian praised Micaela Coel's performance commending her "incredible timing, warmth and gift for physical comedy". Reid Nakamura from The Wrap called the program an "underrated gem is worth a watch".

The second season was also received positively. On review aggregator Rotten Tomatoes, the second season holds an approval rating of 100%, based on 16 reviews, with an average rating of 8/10. The website's critics consensus reads, "Chewing Gum's surreal charm and button-pushing comedy are doubled in its absurdly brilliant second season" Writing for The Guardian, Sam Wollaston called the show "hilariously filthy", praising Coel's performance and involvement in the program. Mike Hale from The New York Times praised the season though he considered the first season better, he commented that while towards the last few episodes "Ms. Coel starts to run short of ideas", there are episodes and moments "equal of the tremendous first season".

=== Accolades ===
Year	Award	Category	Nominee	Result	Ref.
2016	British Academy Television Awards	Best Scripted Comedy	Chewing Gum	Nominated	
2016	British Academy Television Awards	Best Female Comedy Performance	Michaela Coel	Won	
2016	British Academy Television Craft Awards	Best Breakthrough Talent	Michaela Coel	Won	
2016	Royal Television Society Programme Awards	Comedy Performance	Michaela Coel	Won	
2016	Royal Television Society Programme Awards	Breakthrough Award	Michaela Coel	Won	
2016	Royal Television Society Programme Awards	Writer: Comedy	Michaela Coel	Won	
2017	Royal Television Society Craft & Design Awards	Director - Comedy Drama / Situation Comedy	Tom Marshall	Nominated	
2018	British Academy Television Awards	Best Scripted Comedy	Chewing Gum	Nominated	
2018	Black Reel Awards for Television	Outstanding Comedy Series	John Pocock, Michaela Coel, Kelly McGolpin, Nana Hughes, Jon Rolph	Nominated	
2018	Black Reel Awards for Television	Outstanding Actress, Comedy Series	Michaela Coel	Nominated	
2018	Black Reel Awards for Television	Outstanding Writing, Comedy Series	Michaela Coel (for "Age Ain't Nothing But a Number")	Nominated	
2018	Royal Television Society Programme Awards	Scripted Comedy	Chewing Gum	Nominated	
2018	Royal Television Society Programme Awards	Comedy Performance	Michaela Coel	Nominated	
2018	Royal Television Society Programme Awards	Writer: Comedy	Michaela Coel	Nominated	
