= Jack Rooke =

English comedian and writer

- Born: 29 July 1993 (age 33); Watford, England
- Education: St Clement Danes School
- Alma mater: University of Westminster
- Occupations: Comedian, screenwriter, author
- Years active: 2011–present
- Television: Big Boys (2022-2025)

Jack Rooke (born 1993) is an English comedian and writer. His work often explores issues surrounding grief and loss, using humour and documentary film to explore the awkwardness of death.

== Early life and education ==
Rooke was born in Watford, Hertfordshire in 1993. He grew up in Rickmansworth.

From 2004 to 2011, Rooke was a pupil at St Clement Danes School. His father, who was a cab driver, was diagnosed with cancer and died when he was 15 years old.

Rooke studied journalism at University of Westminster, graduating with a BA in 2014.

== Work ==
=== Stage ===
His debut show Good Grief, which played at the Soho Theatre, earned Rooke a nomination for Best Show by an Emerging Artist in the Total Theatre Awards 2015 and a mention in The New York Times' Top Theatre highlights of the Edinburgh Festival 2015. The show protested against government proposals to cut Widowed Parents Allowance, a basic weekly welfare payment for bereaved families in Britain. In collaboration with the Childhood Bereavement Network, the show aimed to raise awareness of these cuts.

Good Grief headlined Soho Theatre's first #SohoRising season. BBC Comedy commissioned Good Grief for a Radio 4 adaptation, broadcast in March 2017.

His second show, Happy Hour, was commissioned by Soho Theatre and premiered at the Edinburgh Festival 2017 to positive reviews and a nomination for The Scotsman's first Mental Health Arts award.

=== Television ===
His debut BBC Three series Happy Man was broadcast in April 2017, a documentary exploring alternative solutions to the male mental health crisis. The show was nominated for Best Factual in the iTalkTelly Awards 2017 and earned Rooke a place on the BBC New Talent Hotlist 2017. He also received Broadcast magazine's TV Writing Hot Shot 2017.

Rooke later created and wrote Big Boys, a semi-autobiographical comedy for Channel 4, based on his Edinburgh Fringe shows. Broadcast in three series from 2022 to 2025, the series revolves around a fictionalised version of Rooke (played by Dylan Llewellyn) attending university and exploring his sexuality while grieving for his father, helped by his friendship with his more extroverted flatmate. The show has earned Rooke multiple BAFTA Award nominations, winning in 2024 for Best Writer: Comedy.

In November 2025, the BBC announced that Rooke would co-write an adaptation of The Secret Diary of Adrian Mole. Other writers include David Nicholls (Head Writer), Caitlin Moran, Caroline Moran, Dilon Mapletoft and Oliver Taylor.

=== Publications ===
He is an ambassador for male suicide prevention charity CALM and deputy edited their free lifestyle publication The CALMzine from 2013 to 2015. He picked up the 2016 Mind Media award for Best Publication. In 2020, Penguin Books published Rooke's memoir Cheer the F**k Up.

== Awards and nominations ==
| Year | Award | Category | Nominated work(s) | Result | Ref. |
|---|---|---|---|---|---|
| 2015 | Total Theatre Award | Shows By An Emerging Company/Artist | Good Grief | Nominated | |
| 2017 | Mental Health Fringe Award | | Happy Hour | Shortlisted | |
| 2022 | Attitude Awards | The Breakthrough Award | —N/a | Won | |
| 2023 | Writers' Guild of Great Britain Awards | Best TV Situation Comedy | Big Boys (Series 1) | Won | |
| 2023 | Broadcasting Press Guild Awards | Breakthrough Talent Award | Big Boys (Series 1) | Won | |
| 2023 | British Academy Television Awards | Best Scripted Comedy | Big Boys (Series 1) | Nominated | |
| 2023 | British Academy Television Craft Awards | Best Writer: Comedy | Big Boys (Series 1) | Nominated | |
| 2023 | Royal Television Society Programme Awards | Scripted Comedy | Big Boys (Series 1) | Nominated | |
| 2023 | Royal Television Society Programme Awards | Writer – Comedy | Big Boys (Series 1) | Nominated | |
| 2023 | Sky Arts Awards | Comedy | Big Boys (Series 1) | Won | |
| 2024 | Royal Television Society Programme Awards | Scripted Comedy | Big Boys (Series 2) | Nominated | |
| 2024 | Royal Television Society Programme Awards | Writer – Comedy | Big Boys (Series 2) | Won | |
| 2024 | British Academy Television Craft Awards | Best Writer: Comedy | Big Boys (Series 2) | Won | |
| 2024 | British Academy Television Awards | Best Scripted Comedy | Big Boys (Series 2) | Nominated | |
| 2026 | Royal Television Society Programme Awards | Writer – Comedy | Big Boys (Series 3) | Nominated | |
| 2026 | Royal Television Society Programme Awards | Comedy Drama | Big Boys (Series 3) | Won | |
| 2026 | British Academy Television Craft Awards | Best Writer: Comedy | Big Boys (Series 3) | Won | |
| 2026 | British Academy Television Awards | Best Scripted Comedy | Big Boys (Series 3) | Nominated | |
| 2026 | British Academy Television Awards | Memorable Moment | "I didn't make it, did I?", from Big Boys (Series 3) | Nominated | |

== Other activities ==
Rooke is an ambassador of CALM (Campaign Against Living Miserably).
