= The Twister: Caught in the Storm =

- Poster
- Directed by: Alexandra Lacey
- Produced by: Tim King; Robin Le Chanu
- Cinematography: David Vollrath
- Edited by: Nic Zimmermann
- Music by: Nick Foster
- Distributed by: Netflix
- Release date: March 19, 2025
- Running time: 88 minutes
- Country: United States
- Language: English

The Twister: Caught in the Storm is a 2025 documentary film produced by Netflix. The films details the events of a devastating EF5 tornado that caused catastrophic damage and killed 158 people in the city of Joplin, Missouri on May 22, 2011. The documentary is directed by Alexandra Lacey and it was released on March 19, 2025.

== Plot ==
The documentary is shown from the perspective of a group of teenagers who survive the tornado, which struck Joplin on graduation day. According to The Hollywood Reporter, the plot centers around "a couple forced to shelter in a freezer, a 17-year-old working in the local frozen yoghurt shop, a school drop-out sucked out of his car only to catch a flesh-eating fungus, [and] the captain of the football team-turned-paramedic".

== Background and production ==
On the evening of Sunday, May 22, 2011, an EF5 tornado struck the city of Joplin, Missouri, causing catastrophic damage to it and the surrounding regions. The tornado had a peak width of nearly 1 mile (1.6 km) as it tracked through the southern part of the city. The tornado damaged an estimated 8,000 homes, becoming the costliest tornado in modern history, and 158 people were killed.

Victims of the tornado were interviewed for the documentary. Director-writer Alexandra Lacey told The Hollywood Reporter, "It was a difficult prospect to find the characters and make sure that we were treating each one of them the right way and making them feel comfortable to tell their story. [...] What really struck me was the lasting mental health impact on the folks there in Joplin. Every time the wind gets stronger, or the sirens go… It’s really hard.”

== See also ==
- Greensburg (TV series) – A show about the rebuilding of Greensburg, Kansas after an EF5 tornado struck the town on May 4, 2007.
