= Pistol (miniseries) =

2022 biographical drama miniseries

- Genre: Biographical
- Created by: Craig Pearce
- Based on: Lonely Boy: Tales from a Sex Pistol by Steve Jones
- Written by: Craig Pearce
- Directed by: Danny Boyle
- Starring: Toby Wallace; Anson Boon; Louis Partridge; Jacob Slater; Christian Lees; Daniel Clace; Dylan Llewellyn; Sydney Chandler; Emma Appleton; Maisie Williams; Thomas Brodie-Sangster; Talulah Riley
- Countries of origin: United States; United Kingdom
- Original language: English
- No. of episodes: 6

Production
- Executive producers: Danny Boyle; Anita Camarata; Hope Hartman; Steve Jones; Paul Lee; Gail Lyon; Craig Pearce; Tracey Seaward
- Cinematography: Anthony Dod Mantle
- Editor: Jon Harris
- Running time: 45–56 minutes
- Production companies: Decibel Films; Sir Weighty Tomes; Crescent Moon Media; Jonesy's Jukebox; wiip studios; FXP

Original release
- Network: Disney+ (UK); FX on Hulu (US)
- Release: 31 May 2022

Pistol is a British biographical musical drama television miniseries about British punk band the Sex Pistols. It was created by Craig Pearce for FX and directed by Danny Boyle. The series follows Sex Pistols guitarist Steve Jones and the band's rise to prominence and notoriety. It premiered on FX on Hulu in the US and Disney+ in the UK on 31 May 2022.

== Premise ==
The six-part series follows Sex Pistols guitarist Steve Jones and the band's rise to prominence and notoriety.

== Cast ==
=== Main ===
- Toby Wallace as Steve Jones
- Anson Boon as Johnny Rotten
- Jacob Slater as Paul Cook
- Christian Lees as Glen Matlock
- Louis Partridge as Sid Vicious
- Sydney Chandler as Chrissie Hynde
- Emma Appleton as Nancy Spungen
- Maisie Williams as Pamela "Jordan" Rooke
- Thomas Brodie-Sangster as Malcolm McLaren
- Talulah Riley as Vivienne Westwood

=== Recurring ===
- Dylan Llewellyn as Wally Nightingale
- Ferdia Walsh-Peelo as Nick Kent
- Francesca Mills as Helen of Troy
- Beth Dillon as Siouxsie Sioux
- Iris Law as Soo Catwoman
- John McCrea as Steve Severin
- Bianca Stephens as Pauline
- Alexander Arnold as Jamie Reid
- Kevin Eldon as Bill Grundy
- Zachary Goldman as Billy Idol
- Daniel Barker as Bob Harris
- Matthew Cottle as Reginald Bosanquet
- Kai Alexander as Richard Branson
- Ben Sardeson as Bertie "Berlin" Bromley
- Trevor Ford as Barnsley Publican
- Johnny ‘Doghead’ Hutch as American Bartender
- Andrew-May Gohrey and Daniel-May Gohrey as Joe

== Episodes ==
No.	Title	Directed by	Written by	Original release date
1	"Track 1: The Cloak of Invisibility"	Danny Boyle	Craig Pearce	31 May 2022
In mid-1970s economically depressed London, Steve Jones is a homeless young man trying to create a rock band. Malcolm McLaren gives him a job and allows him to borrow edgy clothing that he designs with the help of his romantic and business partner, Vivienne Westwood from his boutique, Sex. He decides to manage the band. Steve pursues Chrissie Hynde, even though she's dating music critic Nick Kent. Chrissie has her own ambitions to be in a band. When Steve breaks into the Hammersmith Odeon, he's caught and pleads guilty to the charges. However, Malcolm testifies that Steve is a promising employee, sparing him from time in prison. Malcolm rebrands the band as "Kutie Jones and his Sex Pistols" and arranges their first concert. During the performance, Steve has an attack of stage fright and runs out of the venue. Steve admits to drummer Paul Cook that he has low self-esteem.
2	"Track 2: Rotten"	Danny Boyle	Craig Pearce	31 May 2022
Sex boutique employee Jordan commutes to work in radical punk fashion and makes conservative people around her uncomfortable. Steve, however, admires her confidence. Malcolm makes Steve the band's new guitarist, and hires the eccentric John Lydon as the new singer. John suggests the band be renamed just "Sex Pistols". Chrissie meets with Mick Jones, but their musical collaboration doesn't pan out. Malcolm leases a warehouse as a rehearsal space on Denmark Street. Steve begins living there and quickly learns to play the guitar. During a band meeting, Steve nicknames John "Johnny Rotten" for his bad teeth. As a result, John asks Sid Vicious to join the band so he'll have a friend to stick up for him. Bassist Glen Matlock arranges a gig at Saint Martin's School of Art, where he's a student. Sid introduces himself to Malcolm, and Vivienne believes he'd be a good addition. The Sex Pistols insist on using their own amp at the gig, angering the headlining band and leading to a brawl. The episode is dedicated to Jordan, who died the month before broadcast.
3	"Track 3: Bodies"	Danny Boyle	Craig Pearce	31 May 2022
The band struggles to come up with new material and is on the verge of breaking up. News presenter Reginald Bosanquet buys racy underwear from Sex. Johnny is determined to quit the band until Vivienne shames him into redoubling his effort. An impromptu jam session results in "Anarchy in the U.K." and the band plays a successful gig at HM Prison Chelmsford. Chrissie arranges a sham marriage with Steve for visa purposes, but he stands her up. John volunteers to take Steve's place, but backs out when Nick gets angry about the situation. Steve and John both encounter a mentally ill fan called Pauline, who was raped by a hospital orderly and carries her aborted fetus in her handbag. John tells her to give the baby a decent burial, and she inspires him to write the lyrics to the song "Bodies".
4	"Track 4: Pretty Vaaaycunt"	Danny Boyle	Craig Pearce	31 May 2022
The band tours Northern England and they bond on the beach at a posh hotel. Glen says he admires Steve for starting the band. Malcolm changes the name of his store to Seditionaries. The band visits the new Glitterbest office, where Malcolm produces their contract with record label EMI. The band and some of their followers spark a national fervor when they curse on air during an interview on Thames Television after being provoked by Bill Grundy. The Sex Pistols contend with physical attacks by angry citizens, and John is slashed with a broken bottle at a club. EMI drops the band, but Glitterbest retains the advance. Malcolm's family is assaulted in their home, leading him to realize the band "matters". The Pistols are banned from playing throughout much of Britain, but they get signed to A&M Records. Malcolm convinces Steve to fire Glen due to him not fitting the band's image. John reveals that Sid Vicious is the new bass player.
5	"Track 5: Nancy & Sid"	Danny Boyle	Craig Pearce	31 May 2022
Britain prepares to celebrate the Queen's 1977 Silver Jubilee. Sid meets Nancy Spungen, and they spiral into a codependent relationship and heroin addiction. The band's first single "God Save the Queen" is released. Johnny is furious because Malcolm named it that; he had insisted on "No Future". The band is dropped by A&M after Sid assaults Bob Harris of The Old Grey Whistle Test. Richard Branson signs the band to Virgin Records, and they record the album Never Mind the Bollocks, Here's the Sex Pistols. Sid isn't in the studio because he contracted hepatitis. Steve, Paul, Helen, and Chrissie get Nancy high on heroin and put her on a plane back to the United States. Sid is discharged from the hospital, and the band plays a concert on a riverboat to promote the single. When Nancy returns to London, John tells Sid that Steve tried to get rid of her, although he ultimately blames Malcolm. "God Save the Queen" reaches number one on the charts, but radio still won't play it. Chrissie breaks off her relationship with Steve.
6	"Track 6: Who Killed Bambi?"	Danny Boyle	Craig Pearce	31 May 2022
The band tours the American South to raucous results. Sid goes into heroin withdrawal and resorts to self harm. While in San Francisco, John runs out of patience with Malcolm's antics. When Steve won't fire Malcolm, John quits the band. Malcolm promotes Sid to lead singer. Chrissie debuts her new band, The Pretenders. The Sex Pistols work on the film The Great Rock 'n' Roll Swindle. Sid discovers Nancy has been stabbed to death in their Hotel Chelsea bathroom. He's charged with her murder and released on bail. A year later, in 1979, he dies of a heroin overdose. Steve and Malcolm clash over how things turned out. Steve injects heroin, hallucinates a conversation with John, and they make amends. A flashback shows the band performing at a Christmas Day benefit concert in Huddersfield, Yorkshire for striking firemen and their families. The band is in fine form and show great camaraderie.

== Production ==
The miniseries, created by Craig Pearce, was given a six-episode order from FX in January 2021, with Danny Boyle directing all six episodes. Toby Wallace was cast to play Jones, with Maisie Williams among the supporting cast. Thomas Brodie-Sangster, Talulah Riley, and Iris Law joined in March, as filming began. Some filming was done in Hemel Hempstead.

Production designer Kave Quinn studied Julien Temple's documentary The Filth and the Fury as well as Andrew Marr's BBC docuseries The Making of Modern Britain to portray London as it was in the 1970s.

Esquire magazine said that "the commitment to the punk ethos of the Sex Pistols comes through in the making of the film itself." Director Boyle would let the actors run through scenes and entire performances, not using a traditional shot list. He matched the energy of punk by using cinema techniques such as split-screen editing, flashbacks, archival footage, freeze-frames, gaudy dreamscapes and slow-motion.

=== Music ===
The concert footage and musical scenes were recorded live, without overdubbing or studio effects, and the actors portraying the Sex Pistols and Chrissie Hynde played the instruments and performed their own vocals.

Wallace (Jones), Slater (Cook) and Chandler (Hynde) had the benefit of meeting with their counterparts. Boon could not meet with Rotten due to the latter's disavowal of the project but he closely studied Rotten's stage presence to replicate it and read the books authored by Rotten. Jones also met with creator and writer Pearce to answer questions and provide his input. Cook was involved in the series, and gave his input as needed.

Tracks included in the series included many songs by the Sex Pistols and The Pretenders, other songs of the period, such as "X Offender" by Blondie, and "Evidently Chickentown", a poem by punk poet John Cooper Clarke, along with many older songs.

=== Legal case over music rights ===
In 2021, while the series was still in production, Sex Pistols frontman John Lydon criticised the series, branding it as "The most disrespectful shit I've ever had to endure". Former bandmates Steve Jones and Paul Cook sued Lydon to allow Sex Pistols music to be used in the series despite Lydon's objections. They said they had the support of Glen Matlock as well as the estate of Sid Vicious, and cited a 1998 agreement that allowed a majority decision among band members. Lydon lost the legal battle that August.

== Release ==
Pistol premiered on FX on Hulu in the US and Disney+ in the UK, Ireland, Canada, Australia, New Zealand, and Singapore on 31 May 2022. The series was removed from Hulu and Disney+ internationally on 26 May 2023, after a downturn in subscribers and profits led to cutting over 50 shows.

== Reception ==
=== Critical response ===
On review aggregator website Rotten Tomatoes, the series holds a 65% approval rating based on 62 critic reviews, with an average rating of 6.6/10. The website's critics consensus reads, "Danny Boyle's frenzied direction brings plenty of energy to this punk biography, but the rote conventions of a band's rise and fall make Pistol something of a misfire." On Metacritic, the series has a score of 60 out of 100, based on 28 critics, indicating "mixed or average reviews".

Angie Han from Hollywood Reporter wrote positively that "Pistol does do better than some in breathing a bit of life into that formula, first and foremost through a pair of exceptional performances...by Anson Boon, the intense 22-year old playing front man Johnny Rotten. If John is its [the show's] soul, Malcolm McClaren is its calculating brain. As played by Thomas Brodie-Sangster, he's a Svengali so relentlessly charming, that...[he] turns manipulation into an art form itself."

Empire's Beth Webb felt that "the performances vary in strength - but the collective scrappy energy of the ensemble under the director's guidance is undeniable."

NME's El Hunt gave a mixed review: "Pistol could've gone further - as much as it explores the pitfalls of rock'n'roll mythology, it occasionally falls into the very same trappings that it tries to scrutinize. But, taken at face value, this is a high-energy and creatively pieced-together look back on how punk rock, with Sex Pistols at the vanguard, swept the UK and beyond."

Jim Sullivan of Book and Film Globe wrote that "there's a verisimilitude here. Most of the time, you can suspend disbelief and feel like you're in on the scheme, observing the band as they stumble, scrap and score. There was a cartoonish element to the Pistols. But there's a richness and complexity to them as well and Boyle mines that. Boyle puts the Pistols at the forefront of the punk movement and I've got no quarrel with that, but he fails, by and large, to place them into the larger context of the punk explosion happening all around England: The Clash, The Jam, The Damned, many more. Yes, you get the sense that there's a wave of punk rock going on, but the Pistols seem insular and far more isolated from it than they were in reality.

Madison Bloom from Pitchfork was negative: "Pistol's script is full of grand manifestos and pep talks that turn flashes of rebellion into rote history lessons ... the screenwriter seems petrified that the audience will miss something...certain phrases are repeated to a comical degree...Boyle commits the same crime of over-explaining... With its ham-fisted dialogue and gaudy editing, the new FX/Hulu show Pistol offers a sanitized kind of anarchy."

Deadline Hollywood's Dominic Patter asserted that "Even with sneering classics like 'God Save the Queen' in the well-crafted soundtrack mix...[the film] limps along when it should roar ... [it] gets jammed up in the contradictions of the Sex Pistols where it could have reveled in them with revolutionary enthusiasm and clear eyes."

=== Band members' response ===
Speaking to The Guardian, John Lydon dismissed the series prior to seeing it as: "It's dead against everything we once stood for. The only thing you've got of value in your life, and you're going to cheapen that because you want an extra fiver? Not much of a human being there", and further commenting on the trailer: "It's karaoke, really. The voices, the way they're talking … it sounds like a bunch of kids from Tring, all discussing the latest calamities! That ain't it at all! It's so off.

Glen Matlock said he was very disappointed with the series: "I'm not disappointed that it came out, and I thought it was important that it went ahead because it was based on Steve's story and take on things. And he was the guy that formed the band - not John; Steve. But my portrayal, and particularly my leaving the band — I left the band; I was not sacked. That whole episode where Steve sacked [me] is just bollocks."

=== Accolades ===
Pistol was nominated for Photography & Lighting, Fiction and Production Design at the 2023 British Academy Television Awards.
