= 2023 British Academy Television Awards =

Awards recognising the excellence of British television in 2022

69th British Academy Television Awards
- Date: 14 May 2023
- Site: Royal Festival Hall
- Hosted by: Rob Beckett; Romesh Ranganathan

Highlights
- Best Comedy Series: Derry Girls
- Best Drama: Bad Sisters
- Most awards: Bad Sisters / Derry Girls / I Am... Ruth / Platinum Jubilee: Party at the Palace / The Traitors (2)
- Most nominations: The Responder (4)

Television coverage
- Channel: BBC One

The 2023 British Academy Television Awards ceremony was held on 14 May 2023 at the Royal Festival Hall in London, to recognise the excellence in British television of 2022. The ceremony was hosted by comedians Rob Beckett and Romesh Ranganathan and broadcast on BBC One.

The nominations were announced on 22 March 2023 alongside the nominations for the 2023 British Academy Television Craft Awards. The nominees for Memorable Moment, voted on by the public, were announced on 18 April 2023. BBC One drama The Responder led the nominations with four, followed by Sherwood, Derry Girls, Am I Being Unreasonable? and The Traitors, all with three.

Five programs won multiple awards: Bad Sisters, Derry Girls, I Am... Ruth, Platinum Jubilee: Party at the Palace and The Traitors each won two awards. Including the Craft awards, This Is Going to Hurt received the most awards overall with four wins, three craft awards plus Best Actor.

== Winners and nominees ==
The nominations were announced on 22 March 2023.

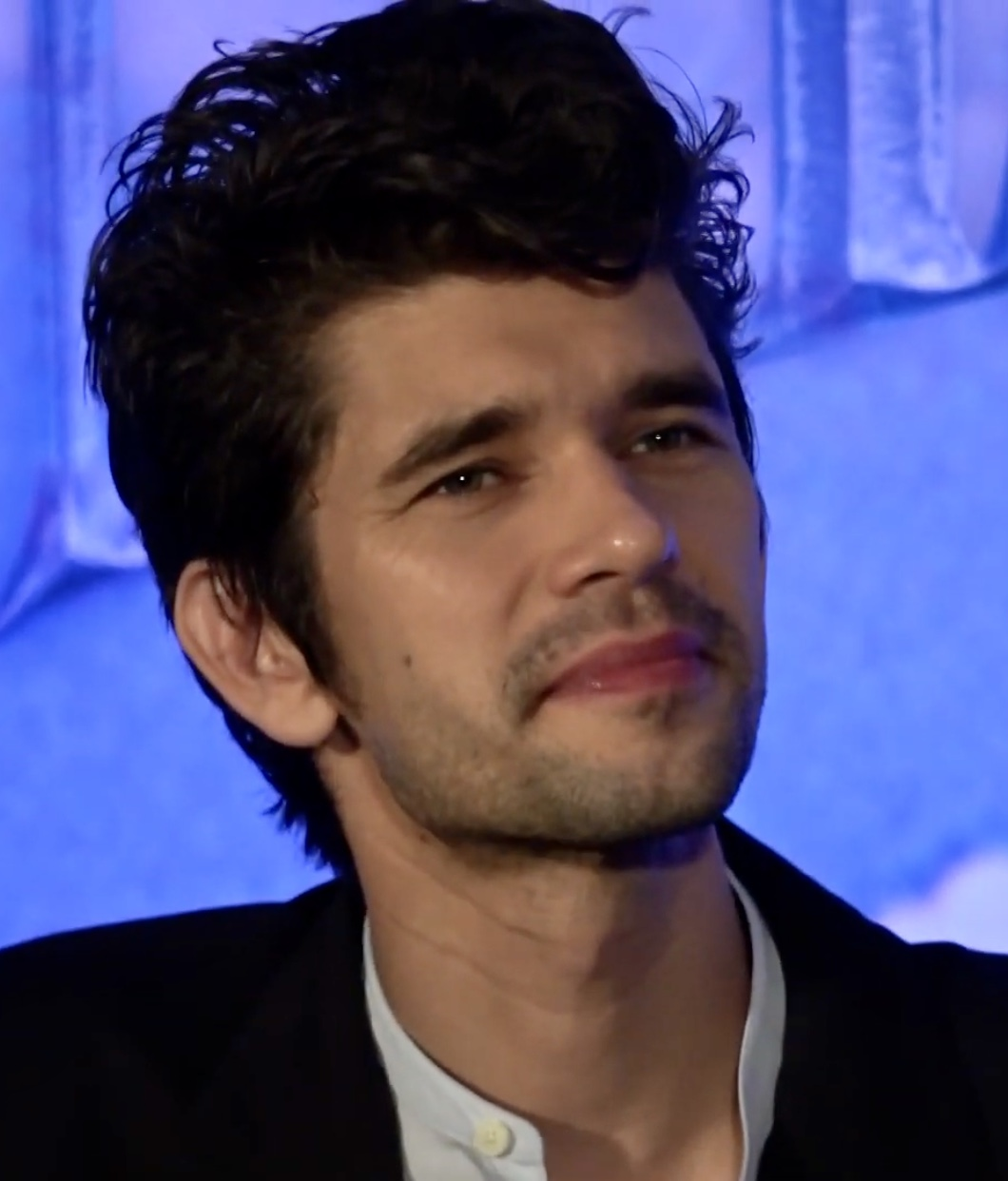
Ben Whishaw, Best Actor winner

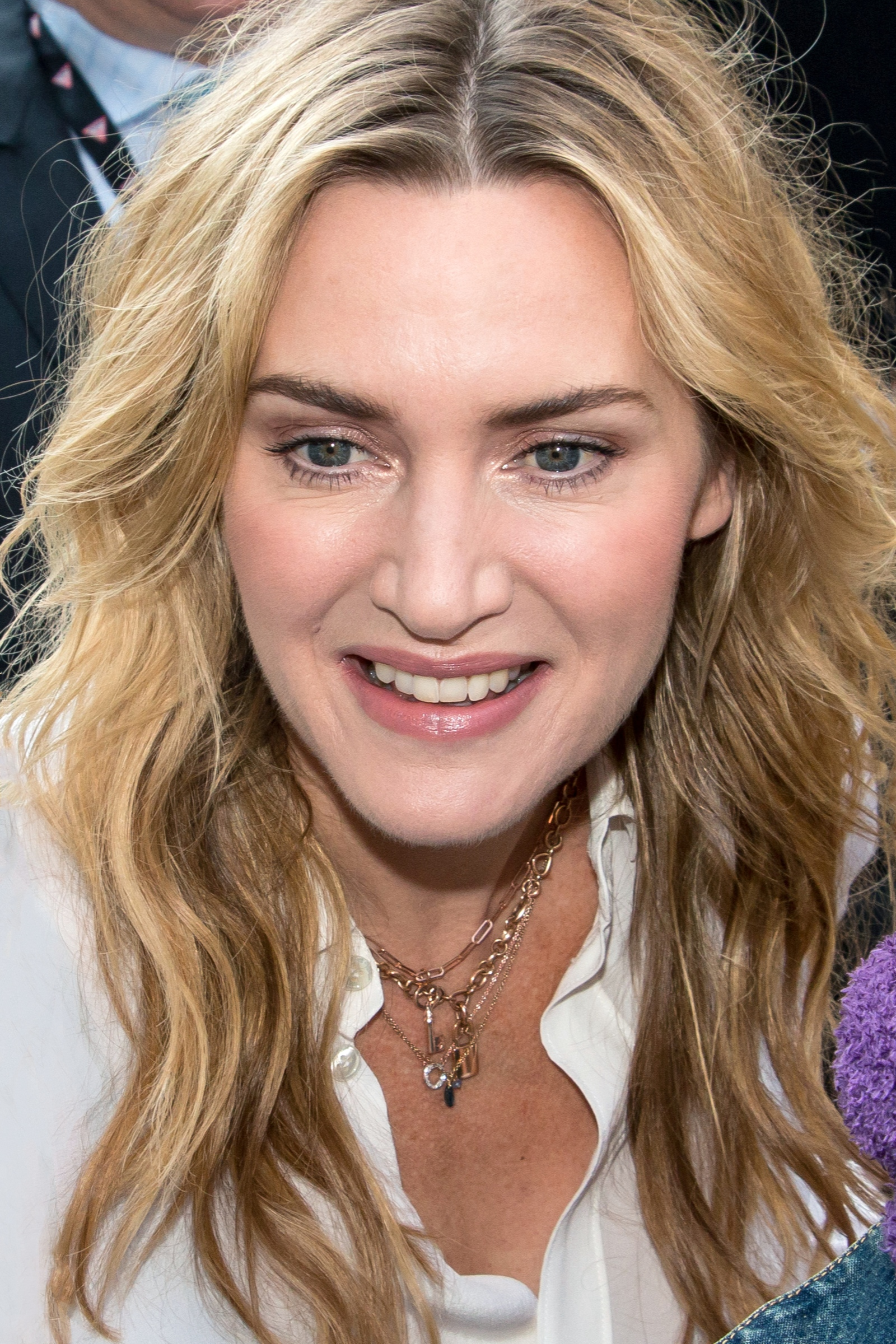
Kate Winslet, Best Actress winner

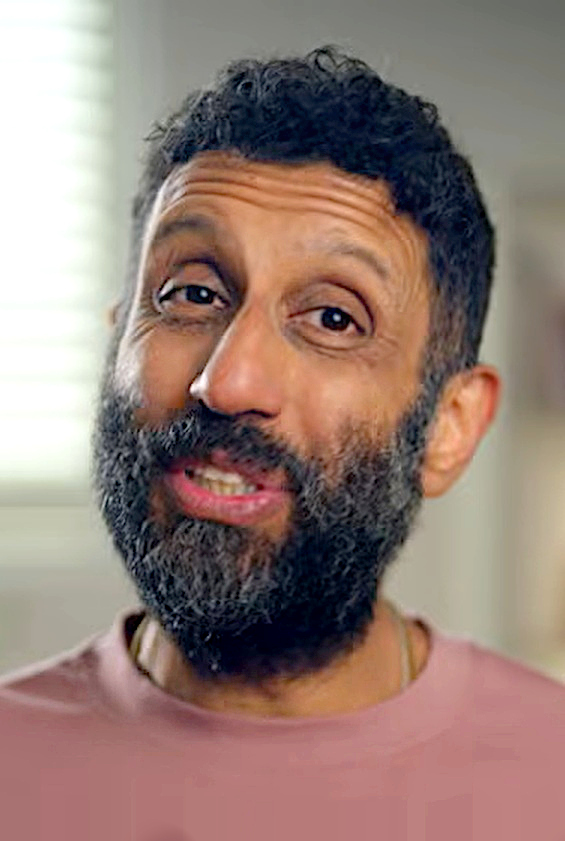
Adeel Akhtar, Best Supporting Actor winner

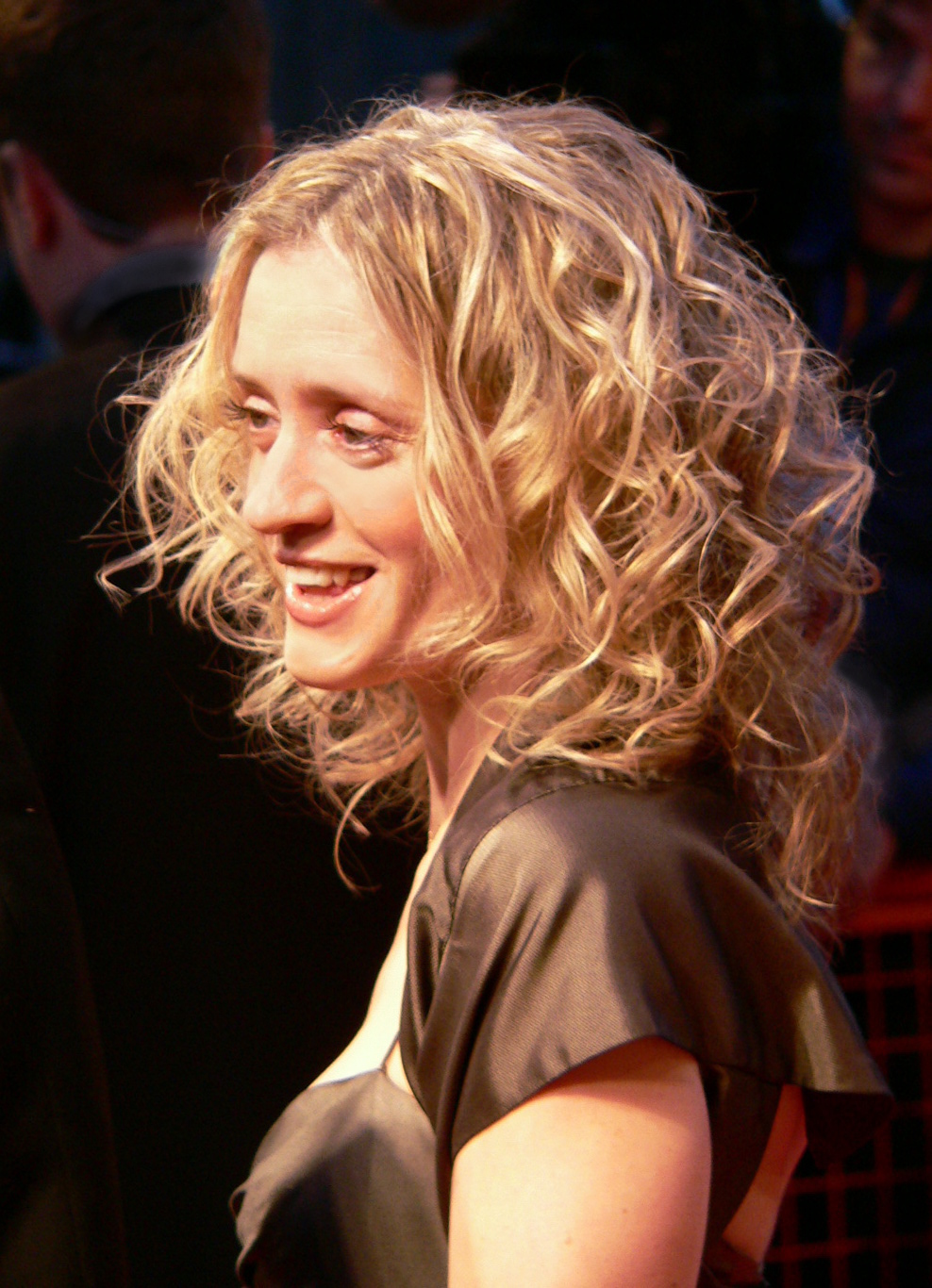
Anne-Marie Duff, Best Supporting Actress winner

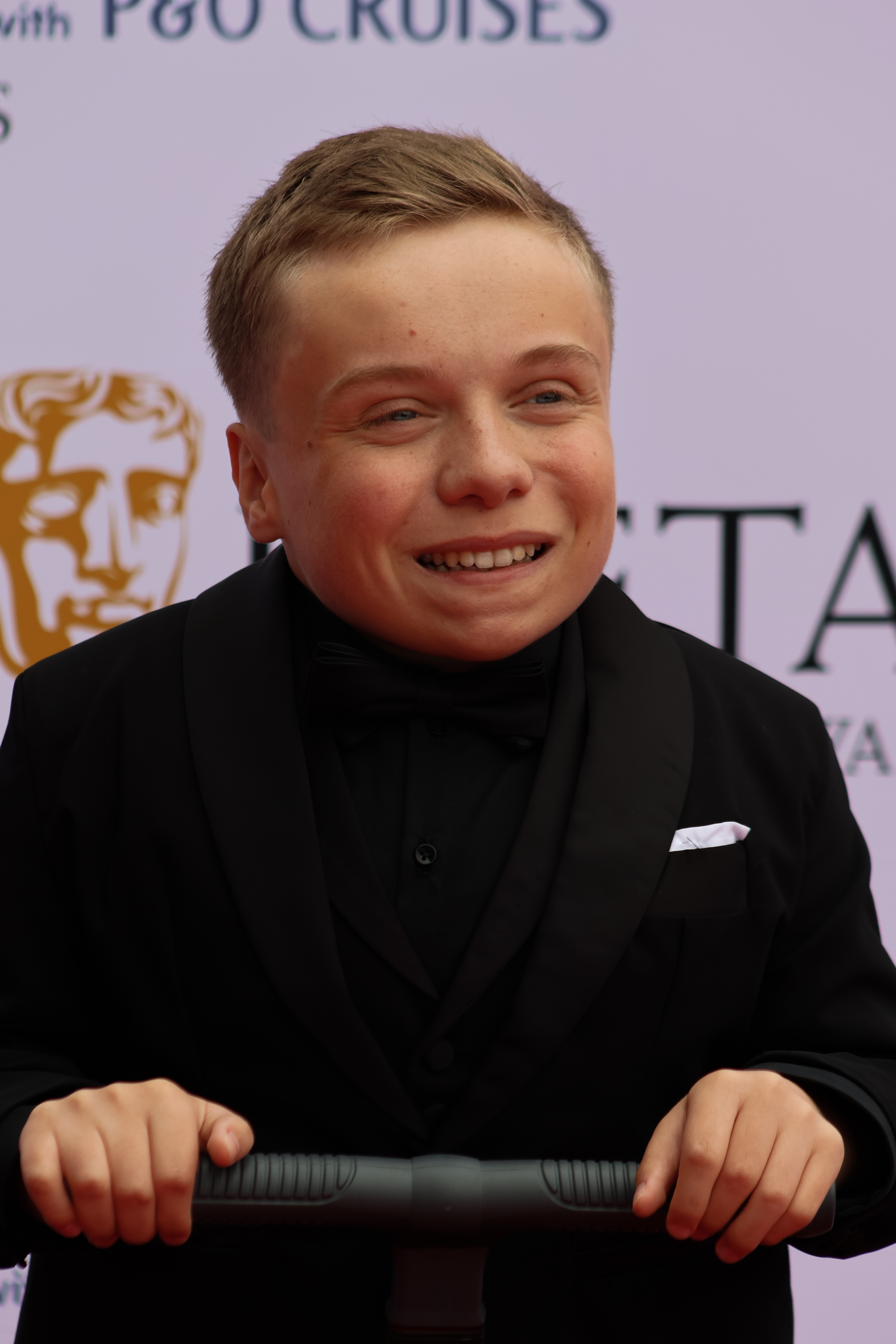
Lenny Rush, Best Male Comedy Performance winner

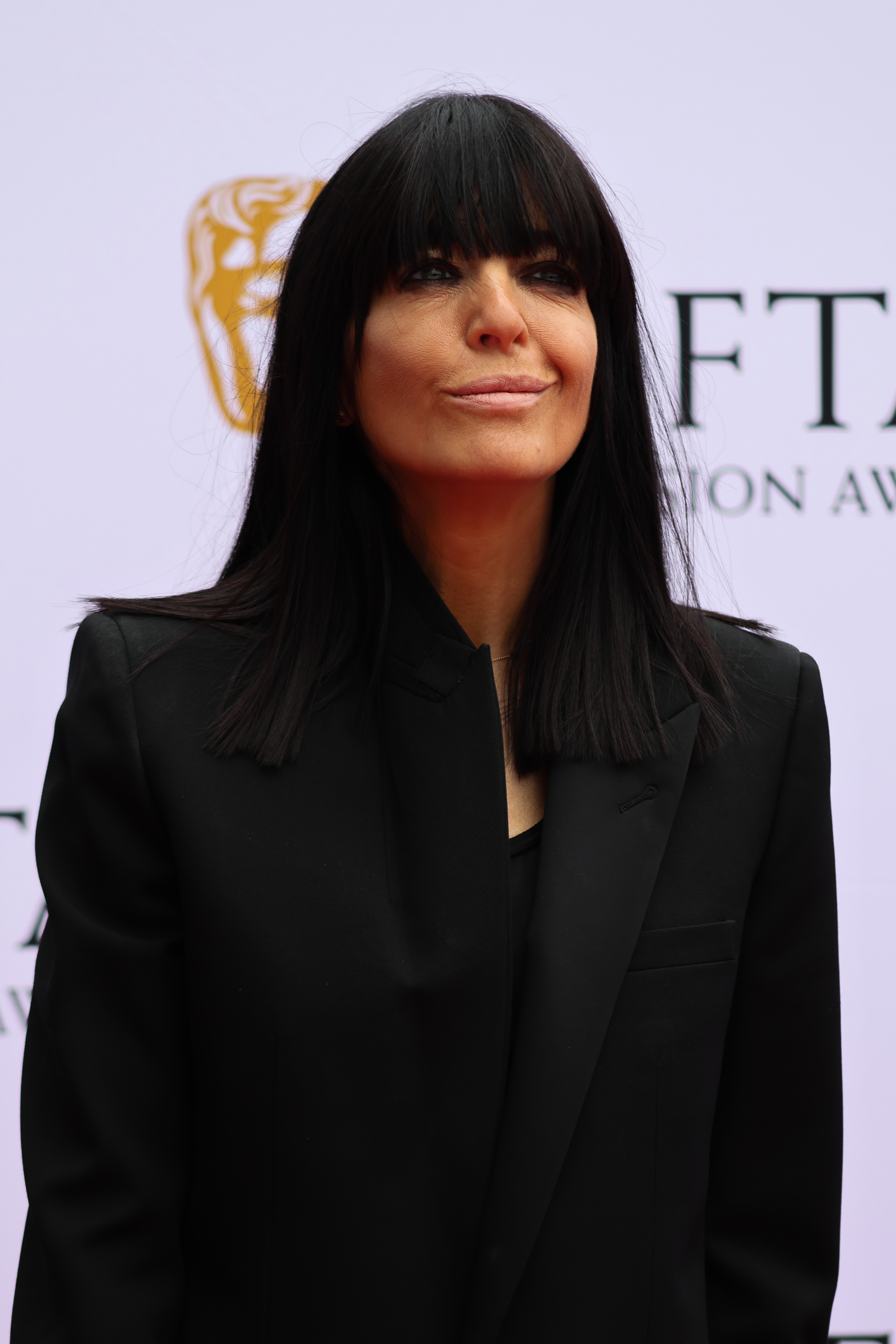
Claudia Winkleman, Best Entertainment Performance winner

Best Drama Series	Best Scripted Comedy
Bad Sisters (Apple TV+); The Responder (BBC One); Sherwood (BBC One); Somewhere Boy (Channel 4)	Derry Girls (Channel 4); Am I Being Unreasonable? (BBC One); Big Boys (Channel 4); Ghosts (BBC One)
Best Single Drama	Best Mini-Series
I Am... Ruth (Channel 4); The House (Netflix); Life and Death in the Warehouse (BBC Three)	Mood (BBC Three); A Spy Among Friends (ITVX); The Thief, His Wife and the Canoe (ITV); This Is Going to Hurt (BBC One)
Best Soap and Continuing Drama	Best Comedy Entertainment Programme
Casualty (BBC One); EastEnders (BBC One); Emmerdale (ITV)	Friday Night Live (Channel 4); The Graham Norton Show (BBC One); Taskmaster (Channel 4); Would I Lie to You? (BBC One)
Best Actor	Best Actress
Ben Whishaw as Adam Kay – This Is Going to Hurt (BBC One); Taron Egerton as Jimmy Keene Jr. – Black Bird (Apple TV+); Martin Freeman as Chris Carson – The Responder (BBC One); Cillian Murphy as Tommy Shelby – Peaky Blinders (BBC One); Gary Oldman as Jackson Lamb – Slow Horses (Apple TV+); Chaske Spencer as Sgt. Eli Whipp / Wounded Wolf – The English (BBC Two)	Kate Winslet as Ruth – I Am... Ruth (Channel 4); Sarah Lancashire as Julia Child – Julia (HBO Max / Sky Atlantic); Vicky McClure as Stella Tomlinson – Without Sin (ITVX); Maxine Peake as Anne Williams – Anne (ITV); Billie Piper as Suzie Pickles – I Hate Suzie Too (Sky Atlantic); Imelda Staunton as Elizabeth II – The Crown (Netflix)
Best Supporting Actor	Best Supporting Actress
Adeel Akhtar as Andy Fisher – Sherwood (BBC One); Samuel Bottomley as Aaron – Somewhere Boy (Channel 4); Salim Daw as Mohamed Al-Fayed – The Crown (Netflix); Josh Finan as Marco – The Responder (BBC One); Jack Lowden as River Cartwright – Slow Horses (Apple TV+); Will Sharpe as Ethan Spiller – The White Lotus (Sky Atlantic)	Anne-Marie Duff as Grace Williams – Bad Sisters (Apple TV+); Adelayo Adedayo as Rachel Hargreaves – The Responder (BBC One); Saffron Hocking as Lauryn Lawrence – Top Boy (Netflix); Jasmine Jobson as Jaq Lawrence – Top Boy (Netflix); Lesley Manville as Julie Jackson – Sherwood (BBC One); Fiona Shaw as Maarva Andor – Andor (Disney+)
Best Male Comedy Performance	Best Female Comedy Performance
Lenny Rush as Ollie – Am I Being Unreasonable? (BBC One); Matt Berry as Laszlo Cravensworth – What We Do in the Shadows (Disney+); Joe Gilgun as Vinnie O'Neill – Brassic (Sky Max); Stephen Merchant as Greg Dillard – The Outlaws (BBC One); Jon Pointing as Danny – Big Boys (Channel 4); Daniel Radcliffe as "Weird Al" Yankovic – Weird: The Al Yankovic Story (The Roku Channel)	Siobhán McSweeney as Sr. George Michael – Derry Girls (Channel 4); Taj Atwal as Rana – Hullraisers (Channel 4); Lucy Beaumont as Lucy – Meet the Richardsons (Dave); Daisy May Cooper as Nic – Am I Being Unreasonable? (BBC One); Natasia Demetriou as various characters – Ellie and Natasia (BBC Three); Diane Morgan as Philomena Cunk – Cunk on Earth (BBC Two)
Best Entertainment Performance	Best Entertainment Programme
Claudia Winkleman – The Traitors (BBC One); Mo Gilligan – The Lateish Show with Mo Gilligan (Channel 4); Rosie Jones – Rosie Jones' Trip Hazard (Channel 4); Lee Mack – The 1% Club (ITV); Sue Perkins – Sue Perkins: Perfectly Legal (Netflix); Big Zuu – Big Zuu's Big Eats (Dave)	The Masked Singer (ITV); Ant & Dec's Saturday Night Takeaway (ITV); Later... with Jools Holland: Jools' 30th Birthday Bash (BBC Two); Strictly Come Dancing (BBC One)
Best Factual Series	Best Specialist Factual
Libby, Are You Home Yet? (Sky Crime); Jeremy Kyle Show: Death on Daytime (Channel 4); Vatican Girl: The Disappearance of Emanuela Orlandi (Netflix); Worlds Collide: The Manchester Bombing (ITV)	Russia 1985–1999: TraumaZone (BBC iPlayer); AIDS: The Unheard Tapes (BBC Two); The Green Planet (BBC One); How to Survive a Dictator with Munya Chawawa (Channel 4)
Best Single Documentary	Best Feature
The Real Mo Farah (BBC One); Chernobyl: The Lost Tapes (Sky Documentaries); Escape from Kabul Airport (BBC Two); Frontline: "Our Falklands War" (BBC Two)	Joe Lycett vs Beckham: Got Your Back at Xmas (Channel 4); Big Zuu's Big Eats (Dave); The Martin Lewis Money Show (ITV); The Misadventures of Romesh Ranganathan (BBC Two)
Best Reality and Constructed Factual	Best Live Event
The Traitors (BBC One); Freddie Flintoff's Field of Dreams (BBC One); RuPaul's Drag Race UK (BBC Three); We Are Black and British (BBC Two)	Platinum Jubilee: Party at the Palace (BBC One); Concert for Ukraine (ITV); The State Funeral of HM Queen Elizabeth II (BBC One)
Best News Coverage	Best Current Affairs
Channel 4 News: "Live in Kyiv" (Channel 4); BBC News at Ten: "Russia Invades Ukraine" (BBC One); Good Morning Britain: "Boris Johnson Interview" (ITV)	Children of the Taliban (Channel 4); Exposure: "Afghanistan: No Country for Women" (ITV); Exposure: "The Crossing" (ITV); Panorama: "Mariupol: The People's Story" (BBC One)
Best Daytime	Best Short Form Programme
The Repair Shop: A Royal Visit (BBC One); The Chase (ITV); Scam Interceptors (BBC One)	How to Be a Person (E4); Always, Asifa (Together TV); Biscuitland (All 4); Kingpin Cribs (Channel 4)
Best International Programme	Best Sport
Dahmer – Monster: The Jeffrey Dahmer Story (Netflix); The Bear (Disney+); Wednesday (Netflix); Oussekine (Disney+); Pachinko (Apple TV+); The White Lotus (Sky Atlantic)	UEFA Women's Euro 2022 (BBC One); Birmingham 2022 Commonwealth Games (BBC One); Wimbledon 2022 (BBC One)
Memorable Moment
Platinum Jubilee: Party at the Palace – Paddington Meets The Queen (BBC One); Derry Girls – The Finale, the people of Northern Ireland vote overwhelmingly for peace (Channel 4); Heartstopper – Nick and Charlie’s First Kiss (Netflix); Stranger Things – Lucas, Dustin and Steve rescue Max from the demonic Vecna by playing her favourite song - Kate Bush's "Running Up That Hill" (Netflix); The Real Mo Farah – Sir Mo Farah revealing he was illegally trafficked to the UK (BBC One); The Traitors – The Final Roundtable (BBC One)

== In Memoriam ==
- Bernard Cribbins
- Kirstie Alley
- Lance Reddick
- David Nicholas
- Harry Gration
- Derek Granger
- Stephen S. Thompson
- Mona Hammond
- Bill Treacher
- Nichelle Nichols
- Deborah James
- Dickie Davies
- Hamish Mykura
- Muirinn Lane Kelly
- Lesley Land
- Frank Williams
- Terrence Hardiman
- Patricia Brake
- Raymond Briggs
- John Bird
- Barry Humphries
- Michael Barratt
- Barbara Walters
- Bill Turnbull
- John Motson
- Michael Deakin
- Piers Haggard
- Josephine Tewson
- Barbara Young
- Tom Owen
- Dale Meeks
- Peter Martin
- Jerry Springer
- Richard Price
- Ruth Madoc
- Kay Mellor
- Paul O'Grady
- Len Goodman

== See also ==
- 2023 British Academy Television Craft Awards
