= How to Be a Person =

BAFTA winning short TV series

How to Be a Person is a British short-form comedy anthology series created and directed by filmmaker Sindha Agha for Channel 4 and E4. The series won the British Academy Television Award for Short Form Programme in 2023. The series explores themes including sexuality, relationships, abortion, pornography, and identity through humorous and emotionally driven stories.

== Production ==
How to Be a Person was commissioned by Channel 4 for E4 and produced by The Corner Shop. The series was created, written, and directed by Sindha Agha.

== Episodes ==
Notable episodes include:

- How to Get an Abortion (When You're Muslim)
- How to Masturbate (Without Breaking Your Dick)
- How to Quit Your Porn Addiction (When You Are 12)
- How to Lose Your Virginity (To a Stranger on the Internet)

== Reception ==
The series won the British Academy Television Award for Short Form Programme in 2023.

The episode How to Get an Abortion screened in the American Film Institute Fest Short Film Competition in 2022.

The episode subsequently received a Special Jury Mention for Screenwriting at AFI Fest 2022.
