= 2026 British Academy Television Awards =

Awards recognising the excellence of British television in 2026

72nd British Academy Television Awards
- Date: 10 May 2026
- Site: Royal Festival Hall
- Hosted by: Greg Davies

Highlights
- Best Comedy Series: Amandaland
- Best Drama: Code of Silence
- Most awards: Adolescence (4)
- Most nominations: Adolescence (7)

Television coverage
- Channel: BBC One

The 2026 British Academy Television Awards ceremony was held on 10 May 2026, at the Royal Festival Hall in London, to recognise the excellence in British television of 2025. The ceremony was hosted by Welsh comedian Greg Davies and was broadcast on BBC One.

The nominations were announced on 24 March 2026, alongside the nominations for the 2026 British Academy Television Craft Awards. Netflix limited series Adolescence led the nominations with seven, followed by BBC One comedy Amandaland with five. Ultimately, Adolescence won the most awards with four, including Best Limited Drama, becoming the first series to win more than three awards in a single year at the main BAFTA TV Awards ceremony.

The Norwegian artist Aurora performed an a cappella version of her song "Through the Eyes of a Child" from her debut album All My Demons Greeting Me as a Friend (2016). The song was featured on the soundtrack of Adolescence.

== Ceremony information ==
=== Category changes ===
BAFTA announced some changes in the voting process for the 2026 ceremony:

- For Best International Programme, all voting members are allowed to vote for both the nominees and winners.
- For the craft categories, an exemption was created to recognize rising international co-productions. A senior team member who is not UK-eligible can be eligible as long as at least 80% of the team holds UK eligibility.

== Winners and nominees ==
The nominations were announced on 24 March 2026.

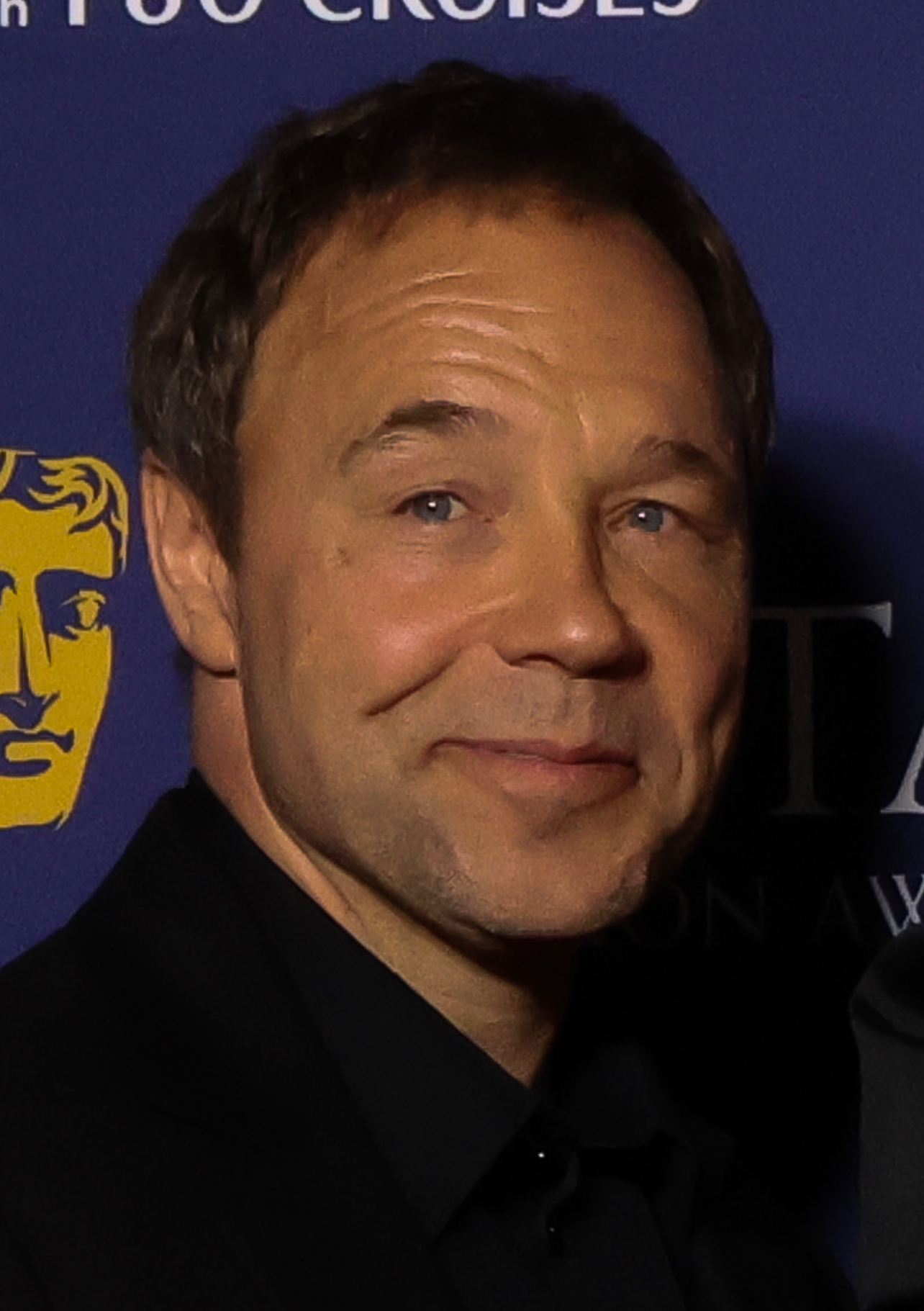
Stephen Graham, Best Actor winner

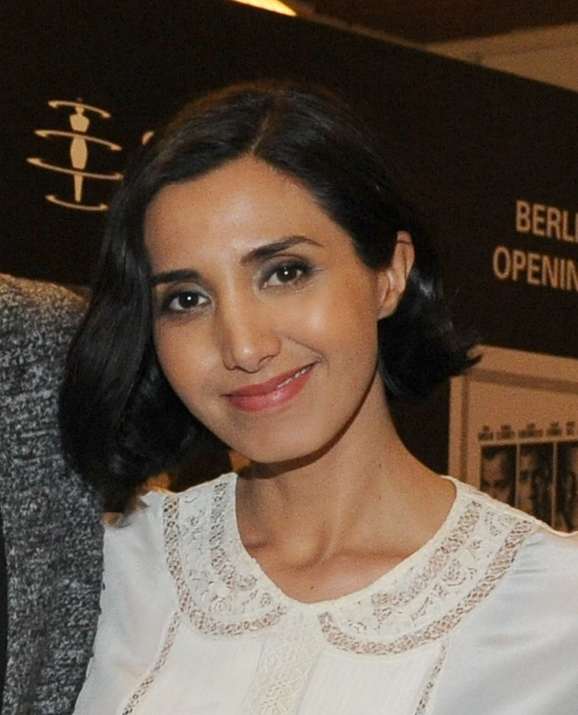
Narges Rashidi, Best Actress winner

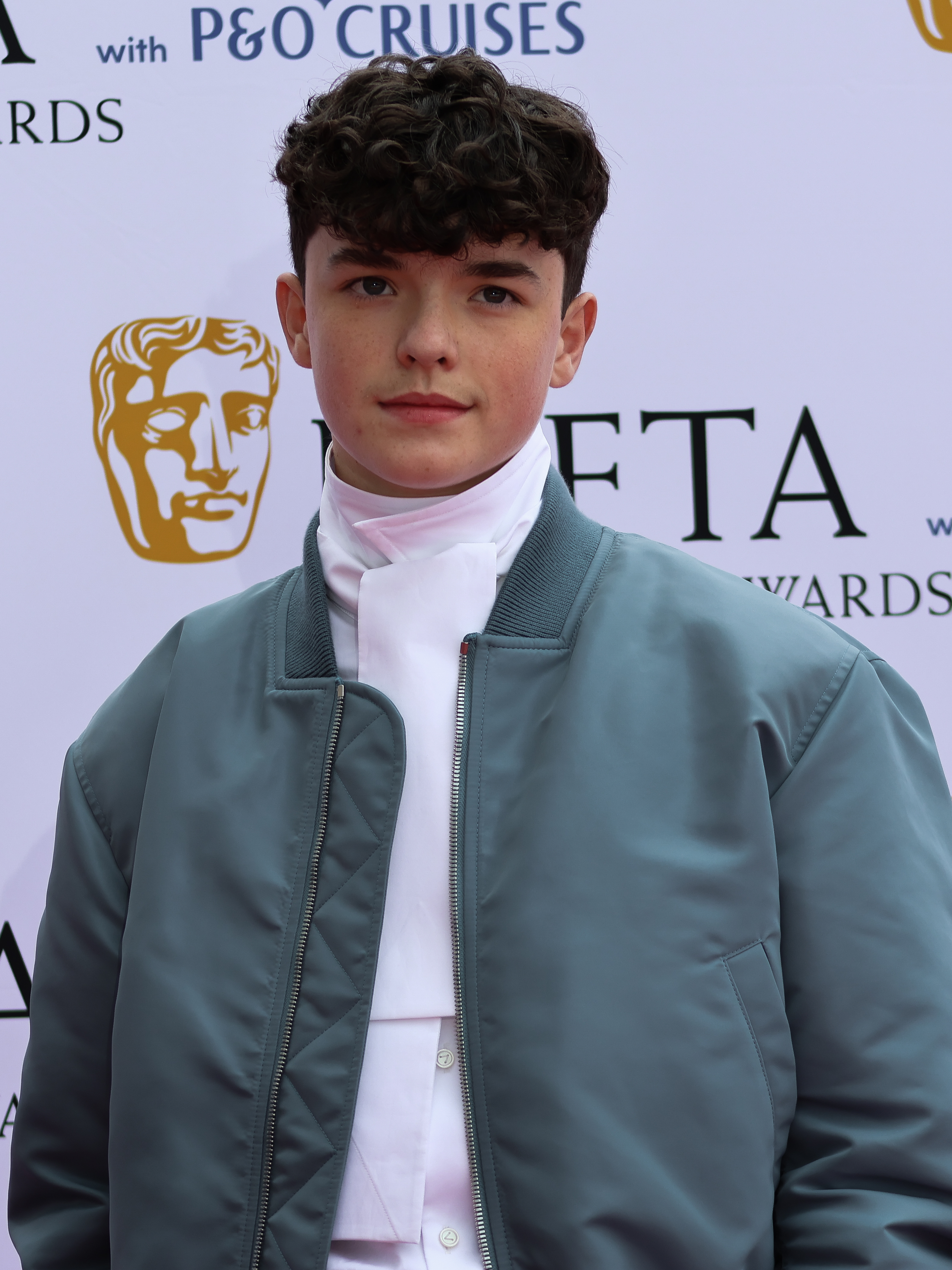
Owen Cooper, Best Supporting Actor winner

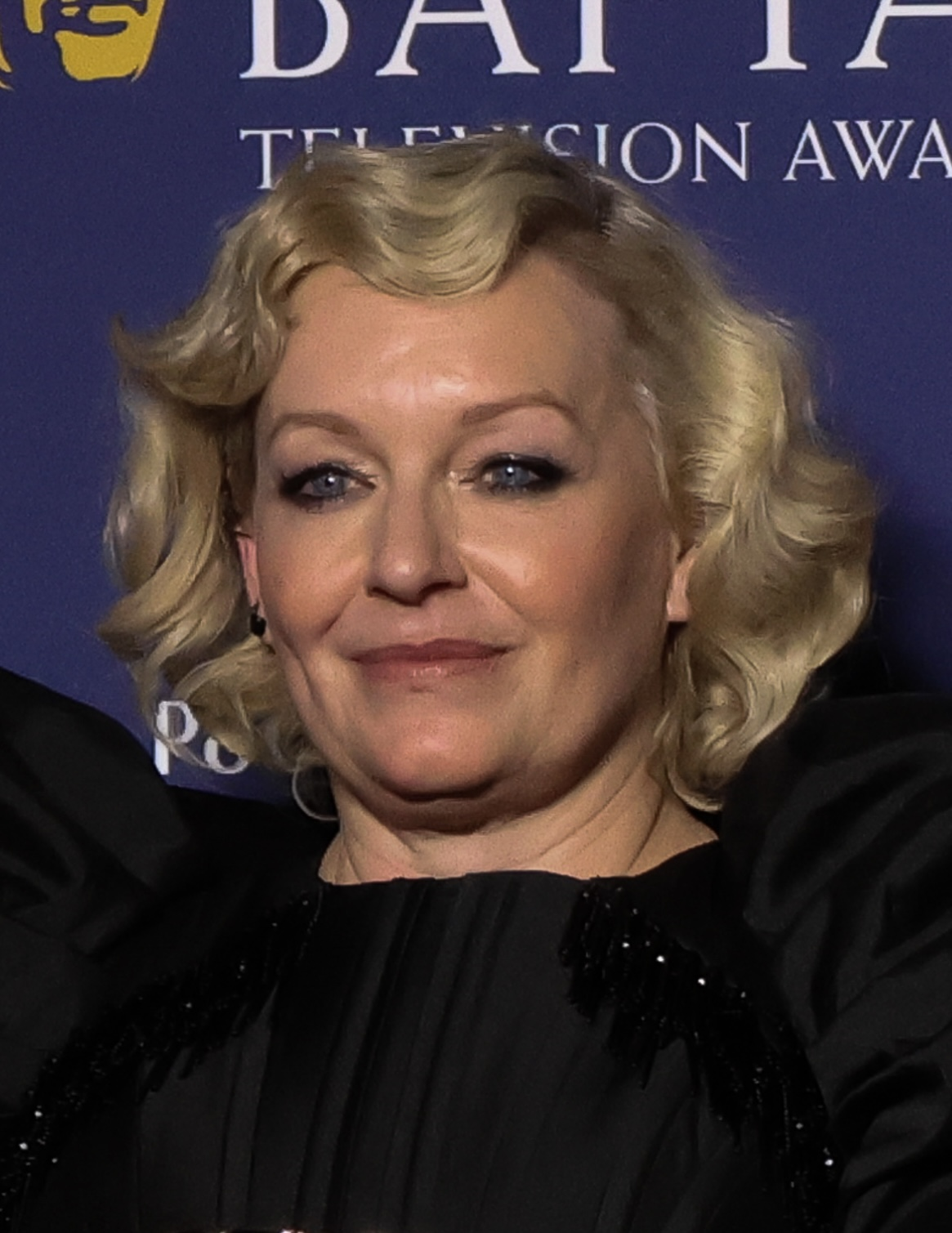
Christine Tremarco, Best Supporting Actress winner

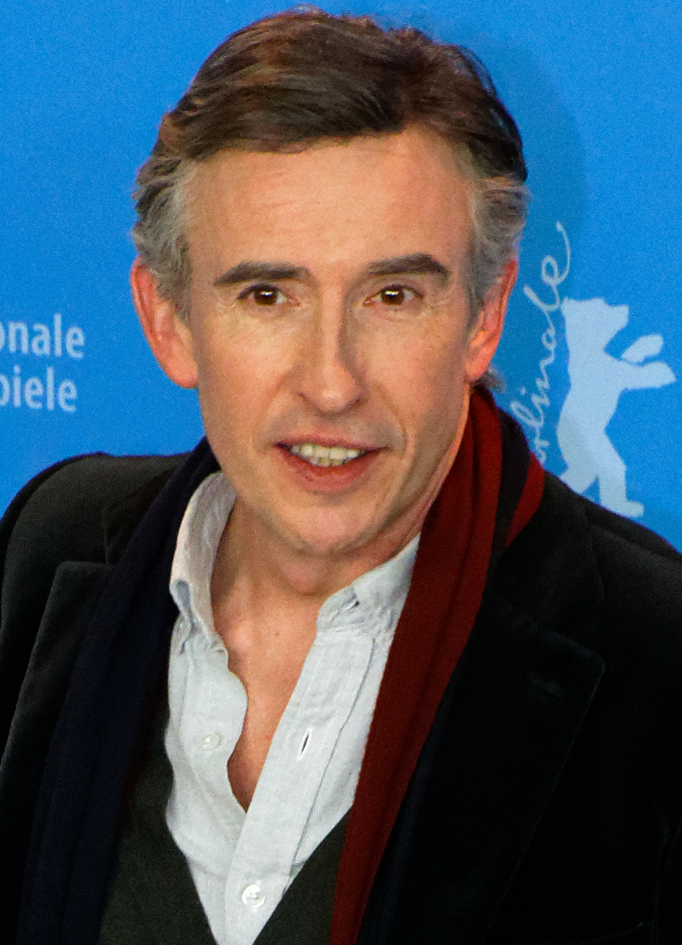
Steve Coogan, Best Male Comedy Performance winner

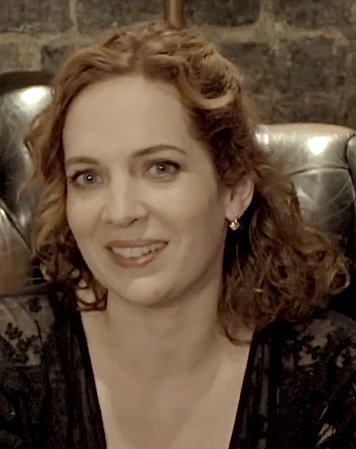
Katherine Parkinson, Best Female Comedy Performance winner

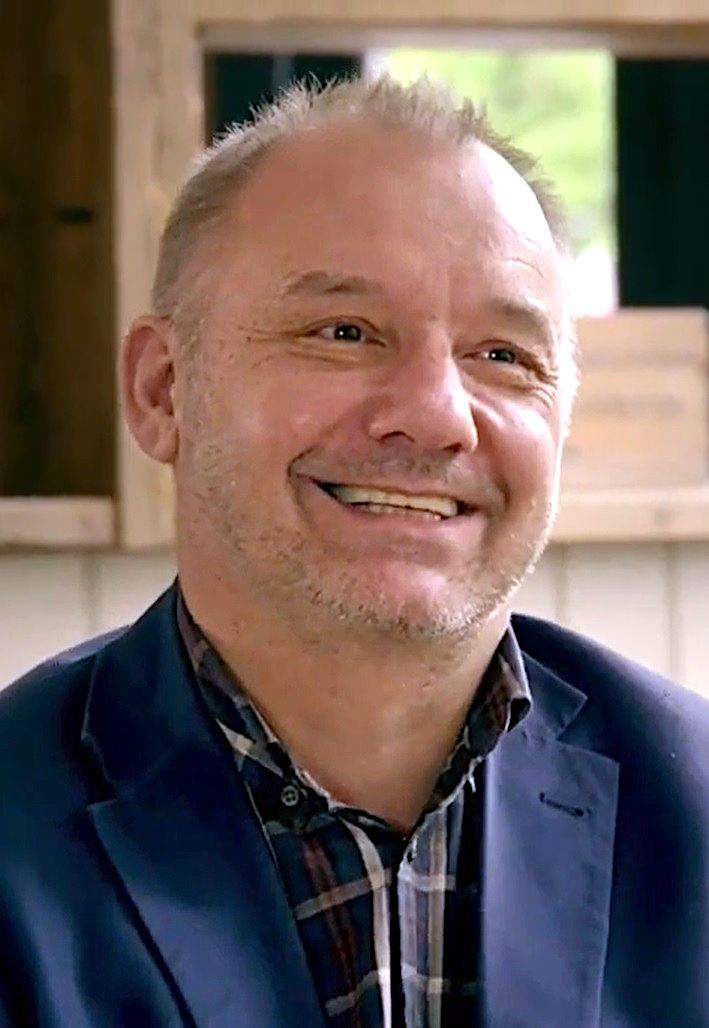
Bob Mortimer, Best Entertainment Performance winner

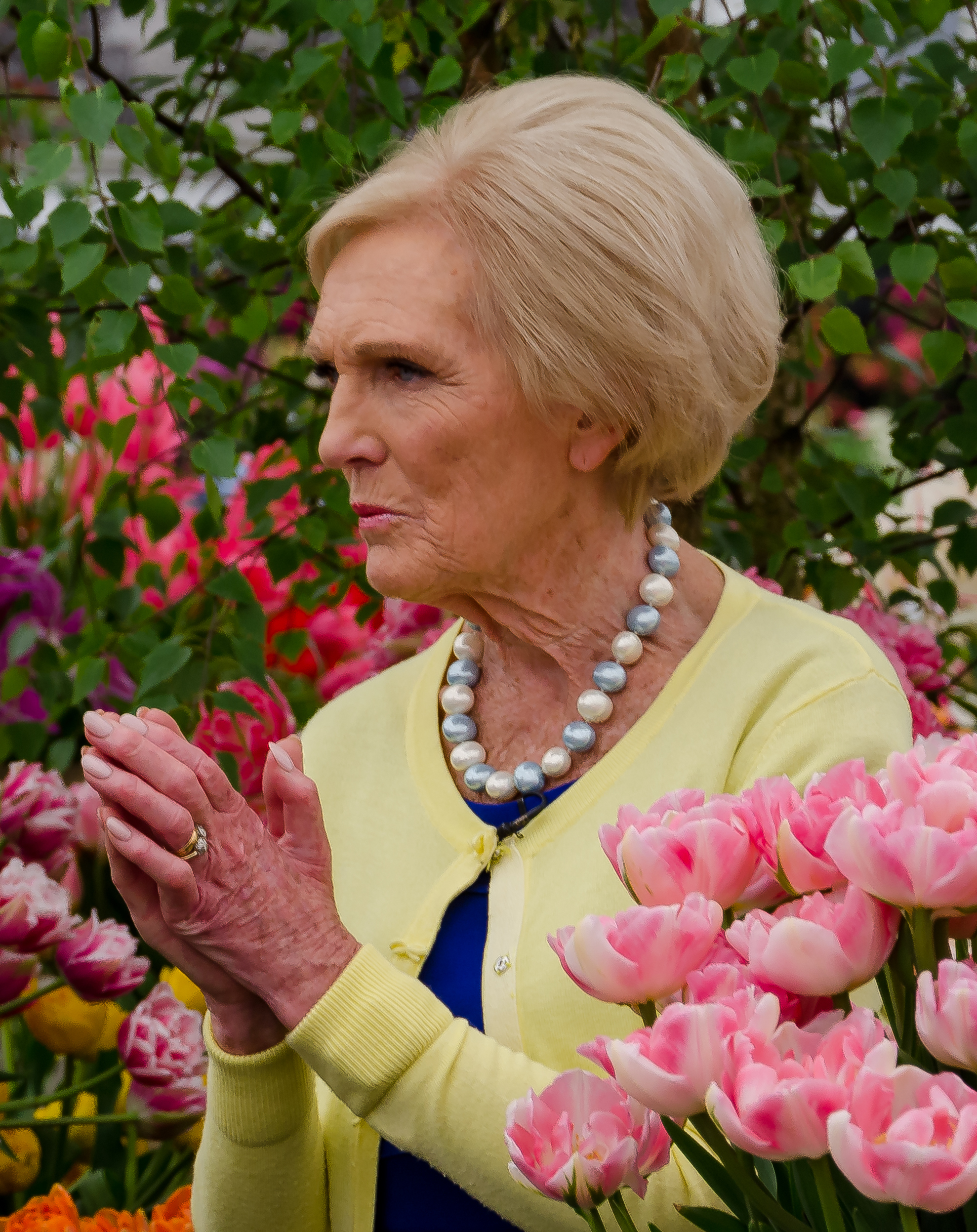
Mary Berry, BAFTA Fellowship recipient

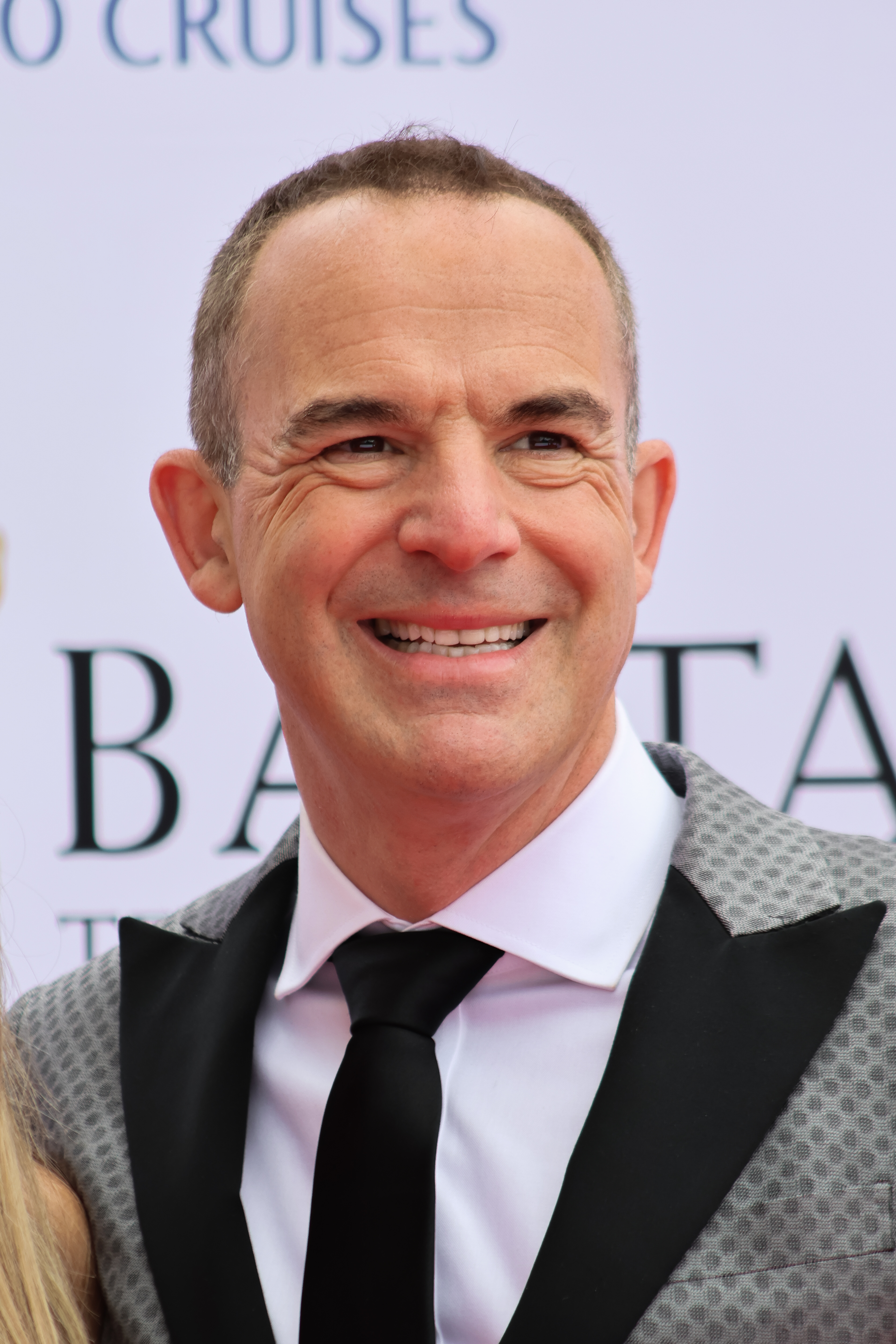
Martin Lewis, Special Award recipient

Best Drama Series	Best Scripted Comedy
Code of Silence (ITV1); A Thousand Blows (Disney+); Blue Lights (BBC One); This City Is Ours (BBC One)	Amandaland (BBC One); Big Boys (Channel 4); How Are You? It's Alan (Partridge) (BBC One); Things You Should Have Done (BBC Three)
Best Limited Drama	Best Soap
Adolescence (Netflix); I Fought the Law (ITV1); Trespasses (Channel 4); What It Feels Like for a Girl (BBC Three)	EastEnders (BBC One); Casualty (BBC One); Coronation Street (ITV1)
Best Factual Entertainment	Best International Programme
Go Back to Where You Came From (Channel 4); The Assembly (ITV1); Knife Edge: Chasing Michelin Stars (Apple TV); Race Across the World (BBC One)	The Studio (Apple TV); The Bear (Disney+); The Diplomat (Netflix); Pluribus (Apple TV); Severance (Apple TV); The White Lotus (Sky Atlantic)
Best Actor	Best Actress
Stephen Graham as Eddie Miller – Adolescence (Netflix); Taron Egerton as Dave Gudsen – Smoke (Apple TV); Colin Firth as Jim Swire – Lockerbie: A Search for Truth (Sky Atlantic); Ellis Howard as Byron / Paris – What It Feels Like for a Girl (BBC Three); James Nelson-Joyce as Michael Kavanagh – This City Is Ours (BBC One); Matt Smith as Bunny Munro – The Death of Bunny Munro (Sky Atlantic)	Narges Rashidi as Nazanin Zaghari-Ratcliffe – Prisoner 951 (BBC One); Siân Brooke as Constable Grace Ellis – Blue Lights (BBC One); Erin Doherty as Mary Carr – A Thousand Blows (Disney+); Sheridan Smith as Ann Ming – I Fought the Law (ITV1); Jodie Whittaker as Susan McIntyre – Toxic Town (Netflix); Aimee Lou Wood as Evie – Film Club (BBC Three)
Best Supporting Actor	Best Supporting Actress
Owen Cooper as Jamie Miller – Adolescence (Netflix); Fehinti Balogun as Amos Crane – Down Cemetery Road (Apple TV); Paddy Considine as Kevin Harrigan – MobLand (Paramount+); Rafael Mathé as Bunny Junior – The Death of Bunny Munro (Sky Atlantic); Joshua McGuire as Douglas Baxter – The Gold (BBC One); Ashley Walters as DI Luke Bascombe – Adolescence (Netflix)	Christine Tremarco as Manda Miller – Adolescence (Netflix); Rose Ayling-Ellis as Miri – Reunion (BBC One); Erin Doherty as Briony Ariston – Adolescence (Netflix); Emilia Jones as Maeve Prendergrast – Task (Sky Atlantic); Chyna McQueen as Hibiscus – Get Millie Black (Channel 4); Aimee Lou Wood as Chelsea – The White Lotus (Sky Atlantic)
Best Male Comedy Performance	Best Female Comedy Performance
Steve Coogan as Alan Partridge – How Are You? It's Alan (Partridge) (BBC One); Jim Howick as Paul Jessop – Here We Go (BBC One); Jon Pointing as Danny – Big Boys (Channel 4); Mawaan Rizwan as Jamal "Jamma" Jamshidi – Juice (BBC Three); Lenny Rush as Ollie – Am I Being Unreasonable? (BBC One); Oliver Savell as Young Alan Carr – Changing Ends (ITV1)	Katherine Parkinson as Rachel Jessop – Here We Go (BBC One); Philippa Dunne as Anne Flynn – Amandaland (BBC One); Rosie Jones as Emily Dawkins – Pushers (Channel 4); Diane Morgan as Mandy Carter – Mandy (BBC Two); Lucy Punch as Amanda Hughes – Amandaland (BBC One); Jennifer Saunders as Aunt Joan – Amandaland (BBC One)
Best Entertainment Performance	Best Entertainment Programme
Bob Mortimer – Last One Laughing (Prime Video); Rob Beckett and Romesh Ranganathan – Rob and Romesh vs... (Sky Max); Alan Carr and Amanda Holden – Amanda and Alan's Spanish Job (BBC One); Lee Mack – The 1% Club (ITV1); Romesh Ranganathan – Romesh: Can't Knock the Hustle (Sky Max); Claudia Winkleman – The Celebrity Traitors (BBC One)	Last One Laughing (Prime Video); The Graham Norton Show (BBC One); Michael McIntyre's Big Show (BBC One); Would I Lie to You? (BBC One)
Best Factual Series	Best Specialist Factual
See No Evil (Channel 4); Bibaa and Nicole: Murder in the Park (Sky Documentaries); Educating Yorkshire (Channel 4); The Undercover Police Scandal: Love and Lies Exposed (ITV1)	Simon Schama: The Road to Auschwitz (BBC Two); Belsen: What They Found (BBC Two); Surviving Black Hawk Down (Netflix); Vietnam: The War That Changed America (Apple TV)
Best Single Documentary	Best Reality
Grenfell: Uncovered (Netflix); Louis Theroux: The Settlers (BBC Two); One Day in Southport (Channel 4); Unforgotten: The Bradford City Fire (BBC Two)	The Celebrity Traitors (BBC One); The Jury: Murder Trial (Channel 4); Squid Game: The Challenge (Netflix); Virgin Island (Channel 4)
Best Sports Coverage	Best Live Event Coverage
UEFA Women's Euro 2025 (BBC One); The 2025 Ryder Cup (Sky Sports); The FA Cup Final (BBC One); Wimbledon 2025 (BBC One)	VE Day 80: A Celebration to Remember (BBC One); Holocaust Memorial Day 2025 (BBC One); Last Night of the Proms: Finale (BBC One)
Best Current Affairs	Best News Coverage
Gaza: Doctors Under Attack (Channel 4); The Covid Contracts: Follow the Money (ITV1); Exposure: "Breaking Ranks: Inside Israel's War" (ITV1); Panorama: "Undercover in the Police" (BBC One)	Channel 4 News: "Israel–Iran: The Twelve Day War" (Channel 4); BBC Newsnight: "Grooming Survivors Speak" (BBC Two); Sky News: "Gaza: Fight for Survival" (Sky News)
Best Short Form Programme	Best Daytime
Hustle and Run (Channel 4); Donkey (BBC Three); Rocket Fuel (BBC iPlayer); Zoners (BBC Three)	Scam Interceptors (BBC One); The Chase (ITV1); Lorraine (ITV1); Richard Osman's House of Games (BBC Two)
Best Children's: Scripted	Best Children's: Non-Scripted
Crongton (BBC iPlayer); Horrible Science (BBC iPlayer); Shaun the Sheep (CBBC); The Wonderfully Weird World of Gumball (Cartoon Network)	Sky Kids Investigates: "World.War.Me" (Sky News); BooSnoo! (Sky Kids); Deadly 60: "Saving Sharks" (CBBC); A Real Bugs Life (Disney+)
Memorable Moment
The Celebrity Traitors: "Alan Carr wins The Celebrity Traitors" (BBC One); Adolescence: "Jamie snaps at the psychologist" (Netflix); Big Boys: "I didn't make it, did I?" (Channel 4); Blue Lights: "The police are warned of an ambush to plot to silence a key witness" (BBC One); Last One Laughing: "Bob Mortimer and Richard Ayoade's speed date" (Prime Video); What It Feels Like for a Girl: "Byron leaves for Brighton to start university, where she introduces herself as Paris" (BBC Three)
BAFTA Fellowship	Special Award
Mary Berry	Martin Lewis

== In Memoriam ==
- Danielle Scott-Haughton
- Jilly Cooper
- Judy Loe
- Pik-Sen Lim
- Nabil Shaban
- Patrick Murray
- Loretta Swit
- Tchéky Karyo
- John Virgo
- Desmond Morris
- Biddy Baxter
- Roger Laughton
- George Wendt
- Stanley Baxter
- Eric Dane
- James Van Der Beek
- Prunella Scales
- Quentin Willson
- Humphrey Burton
- Kenith Trodd
- John Stapleton
- Fred Emery
- Will Daws
- Stuart Prebble
- Jane Lapotaire
- Yvonne Brewster
- Samantha Eggar
- Malcolm-Jamal Warner
- Mel Schilling
- Andy Kershaw
- Jack Shepherd
- Sandy Gall
- Derek Martin
- Tom Georgeson
- Angela Pleasence
- Ozzy Osbourne
- Kim Woodburn
- Alan Yentob
- Patricia Routledge

== See also ==
- 2026 British Academy Television Craft Awards
