= British Academy Television Award for Best Male Comedy Performance =

Class of award

British Academy Television Award
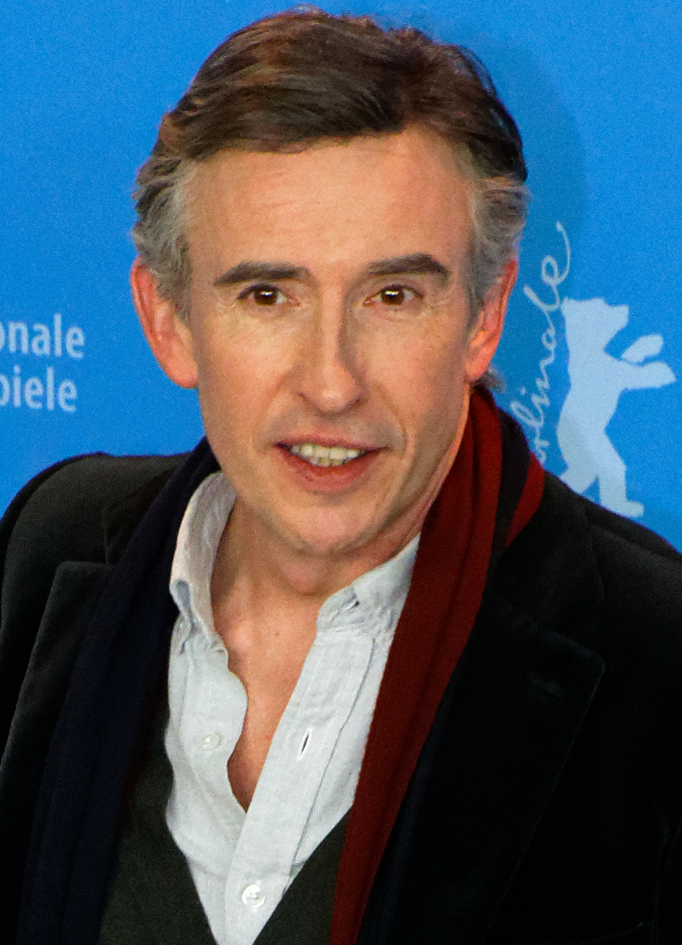
- 2026 recipient: Steve Coogan
- Country: United Kingdom
- Presented by: British Academy of Film and Television Arts
- First award: 2009 (presented in 2010)
- Currently held by: Steve Coogan for How Are You? It's Alan (Partridge) (2026)

Highlights
- Most wins: Steve Coogan (4)
- Website: http://www.bafta.org/

This page lists the winners and nominees for the British Academy Television Award for Best Male Comedy Performance, since its institution in 2009.

The British Academy of Film and Television Arts (BAFTA), is a British organisation that hosts annual awards shows for film, television, children's film and television, and interactive media.

Since 2009 (presented in 2010), there have been two separate comedy performance awards for Best Male Comedy Performance and Best Female Comedy Performance. Previously one award for Best Comedy Performance was presented. Steve Coogan has won the award four times, and Jamie Demetriou twice.

== Winners and nominees ==
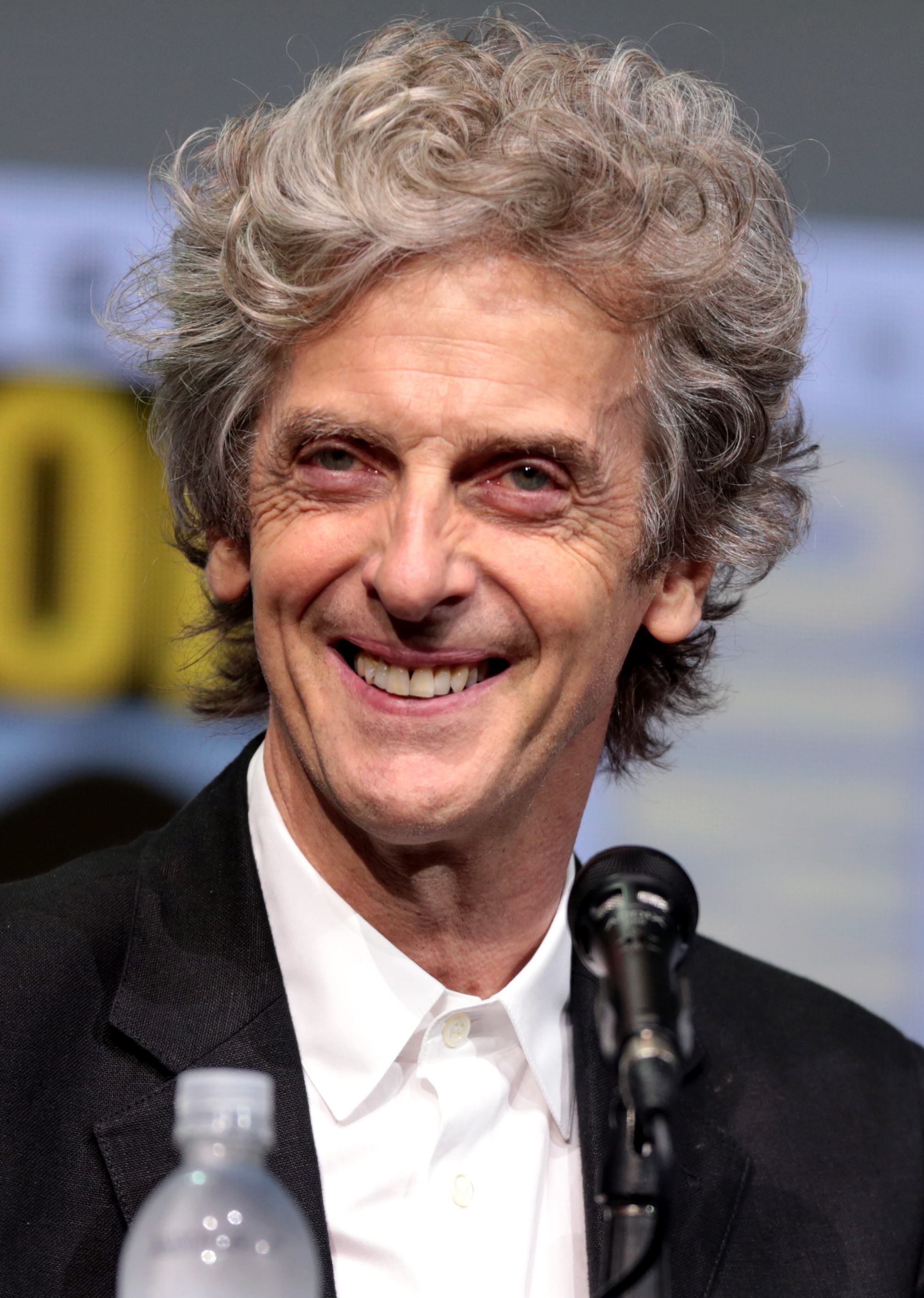
Peter Capaldi was the inaugural winner for The Thick of It.

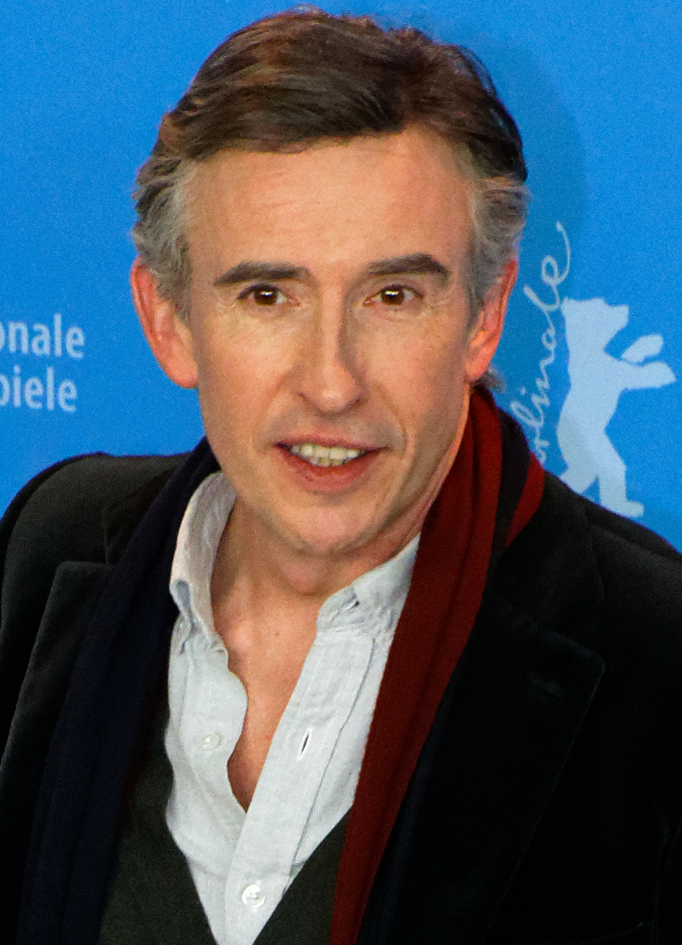
Steve Coogan has won four times, for The Trip (2011), Alan Partridge: Welcome to the Places of My Life (2013), Alan Partridge's Scissored Isle (2017) and How Are You? It's Alan (Partridge) (2026).

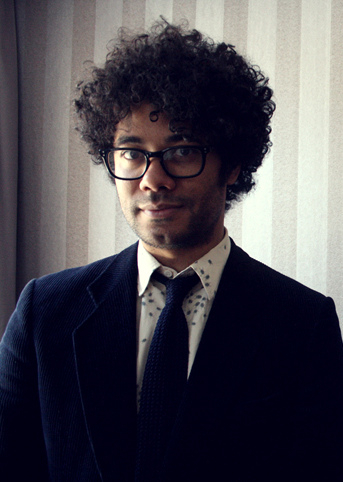
Richard Ayoade won for The IT Crowd in 2014.

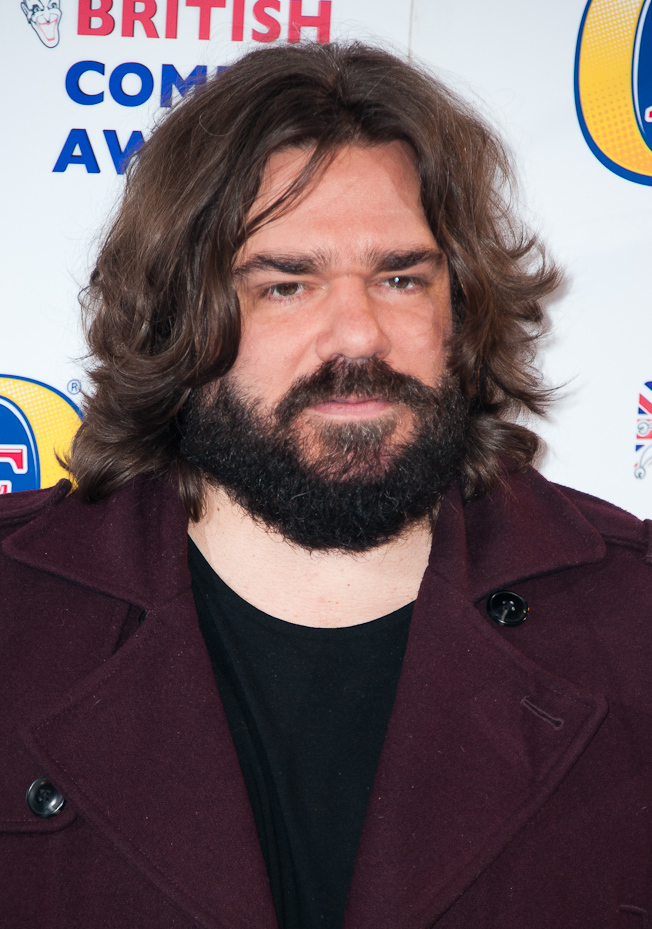
Matt Berry won for Toast of London in 2015.

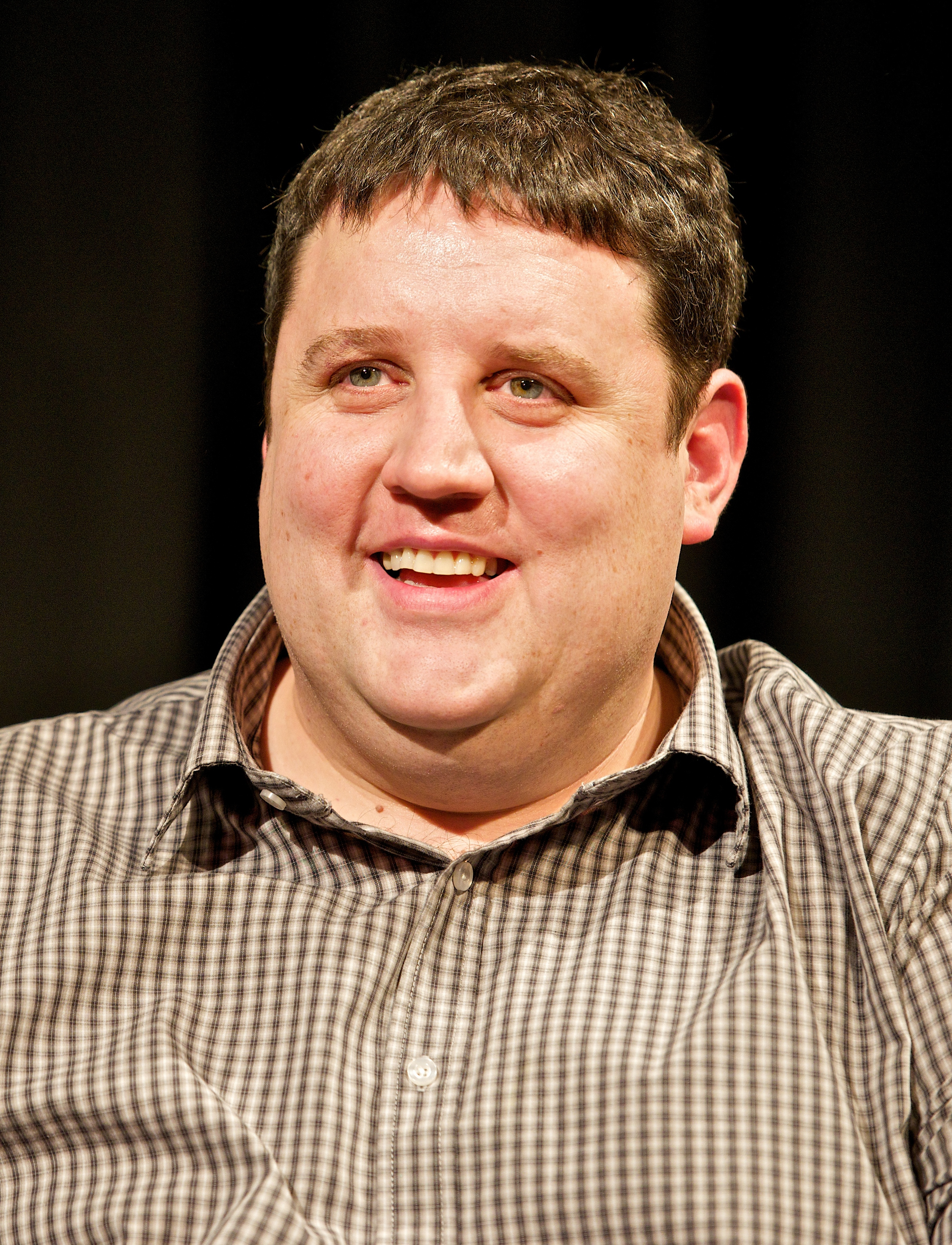
Peter Kay won for Peter Kay's Car Share in 2016.

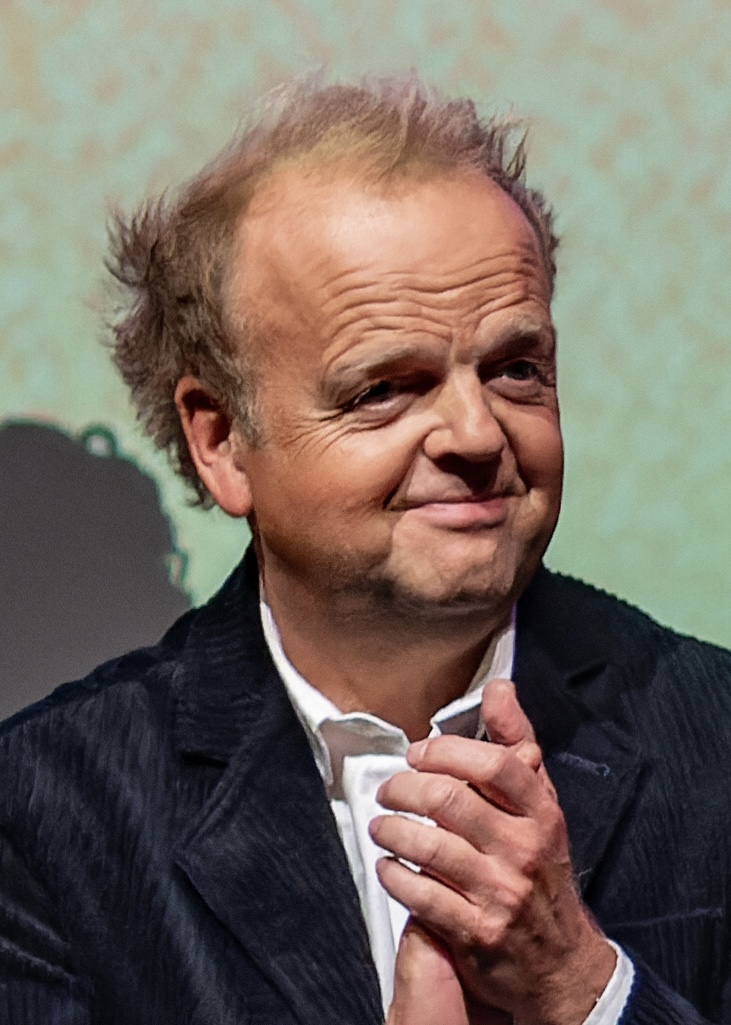
Toby Jones won for Detectorists in 2018.

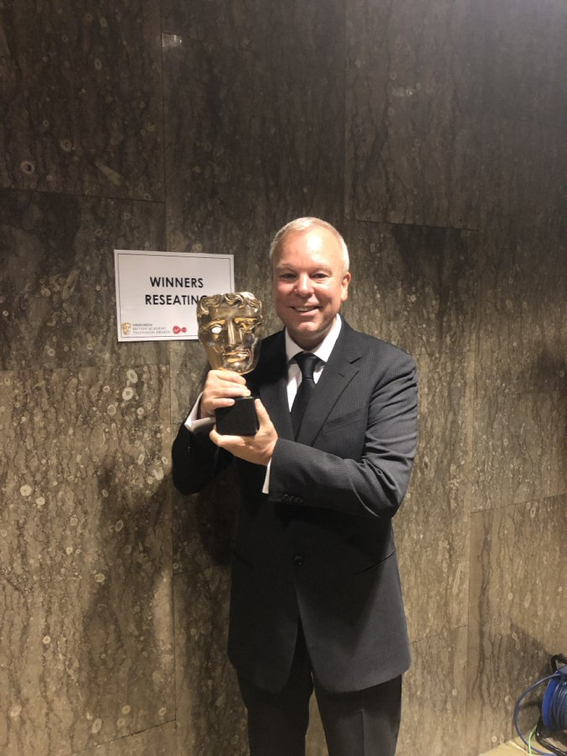
Steve Pemberton won for Inside No. 9 in 2019.

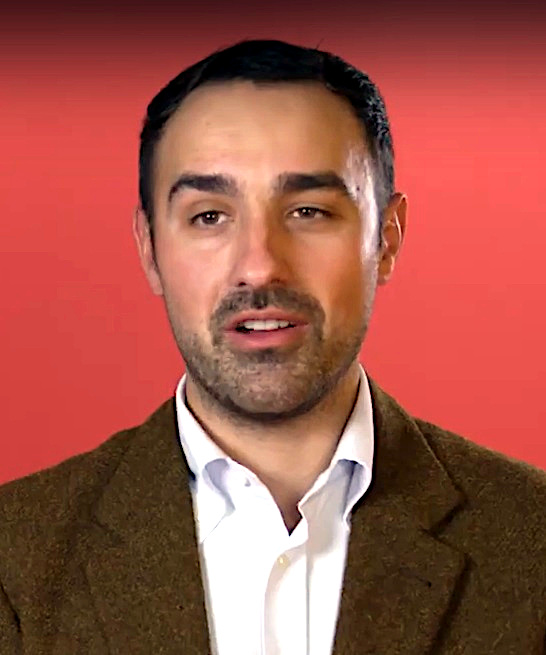
Jamie Demetriou won for Stath Lets Flats in 2020 and 2022.

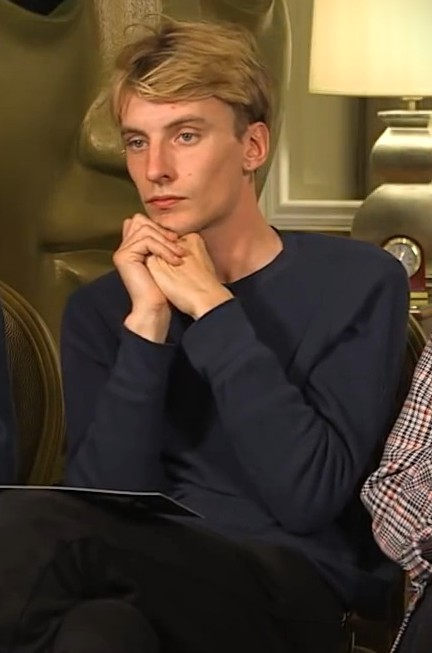
Charlie Cooper won for This Country in 2021.

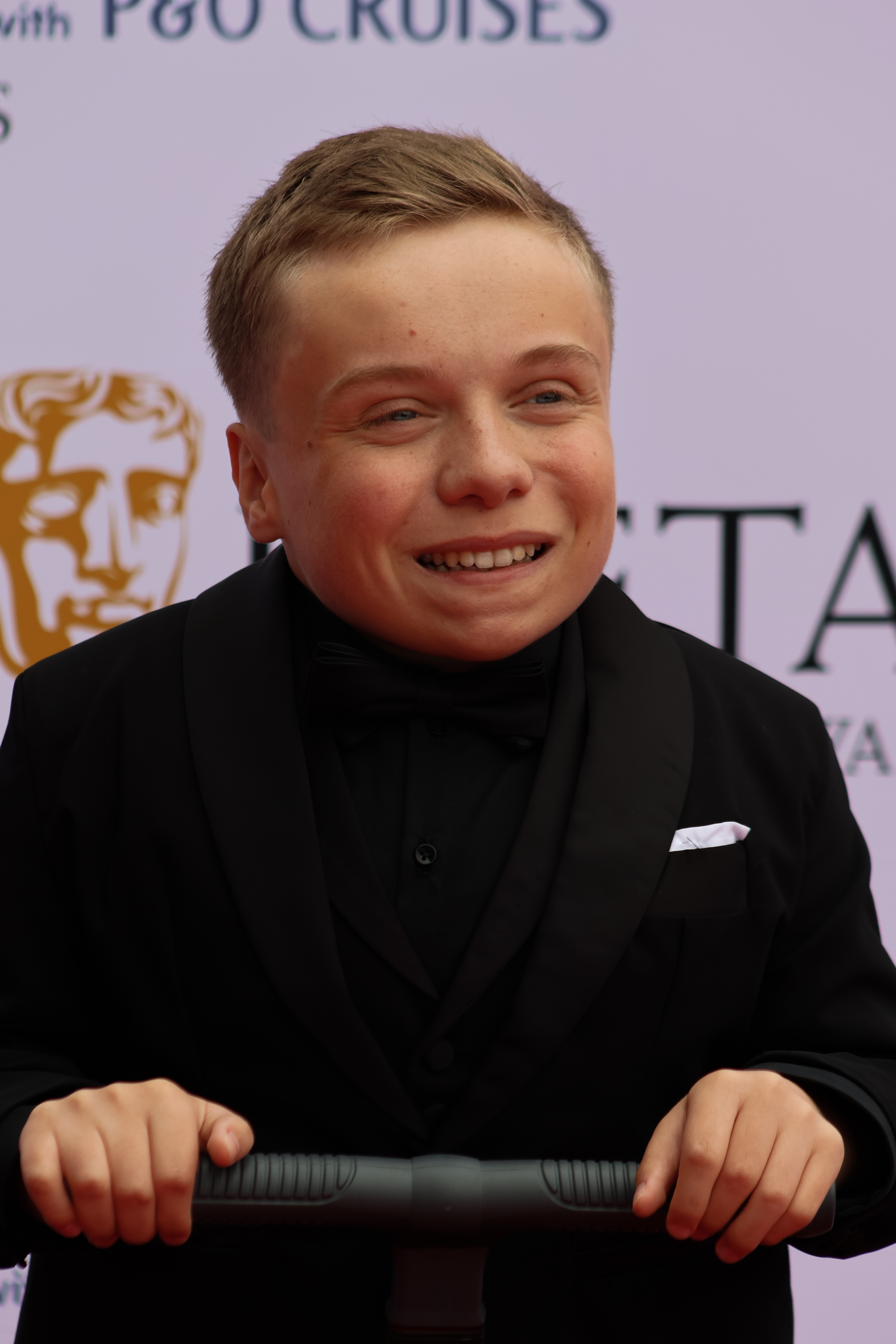
Lenny Rush won for Am I Being Unreasonable? in 2023.

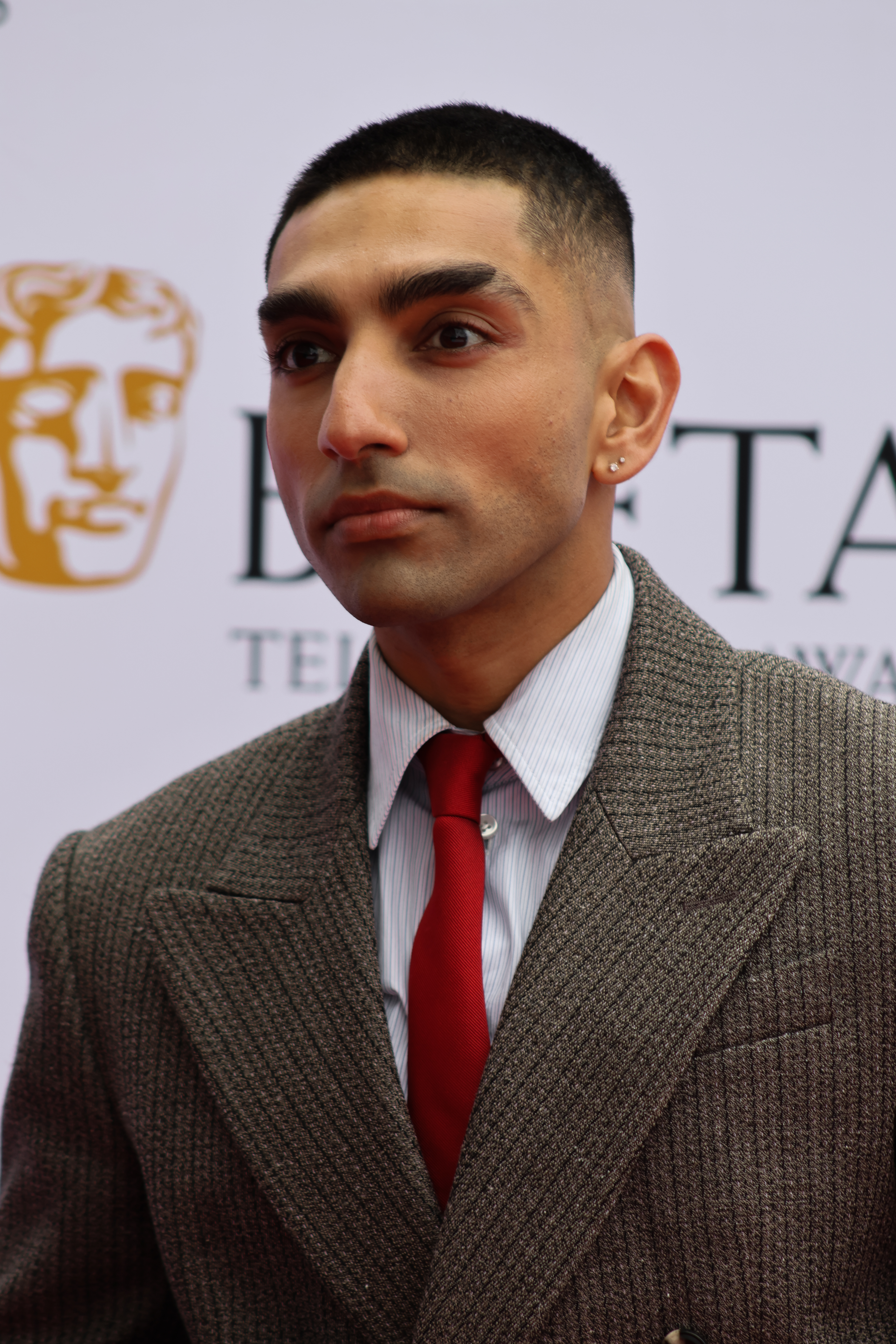
Mawaan Rizwan won for Juice in 2024.

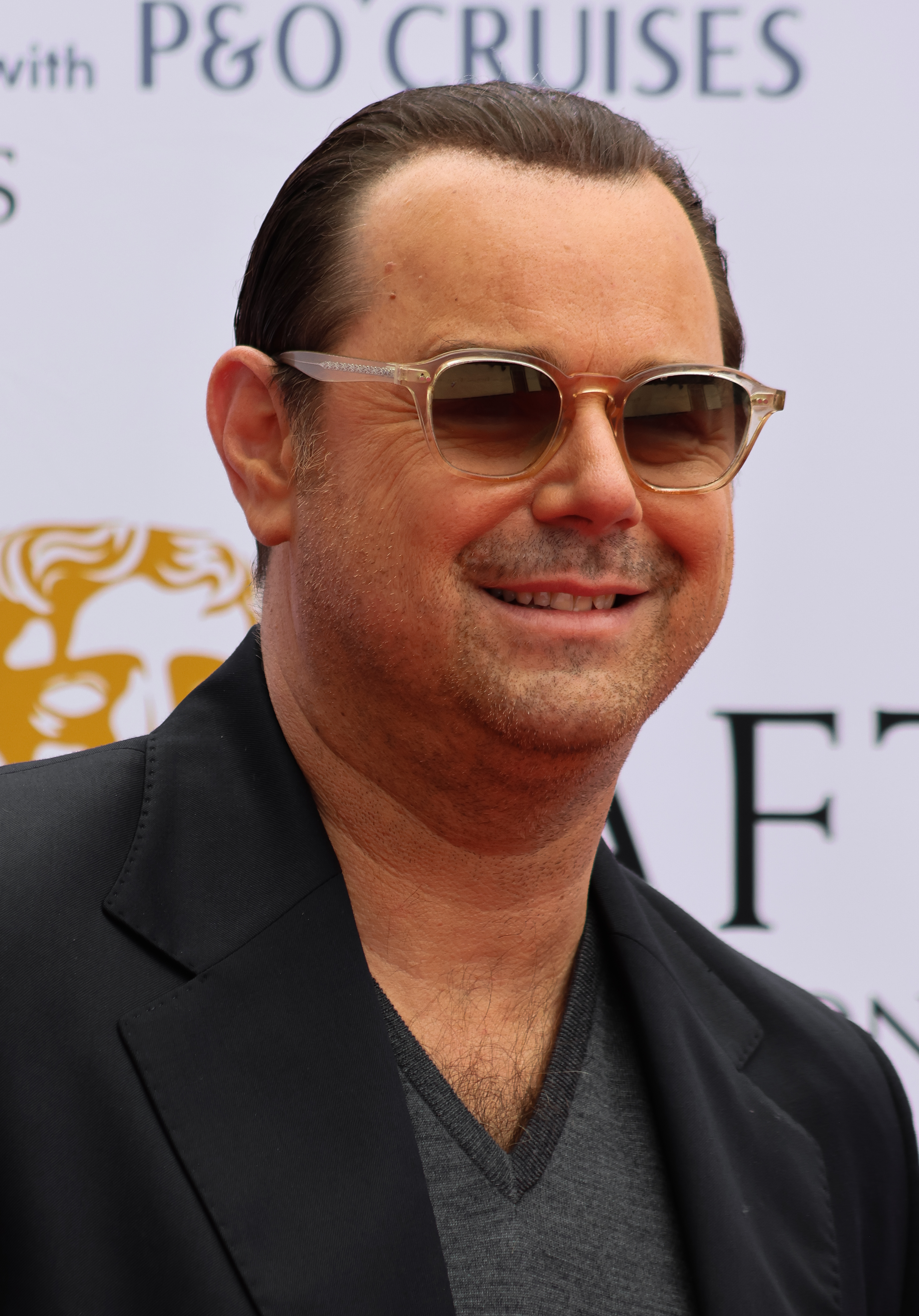
Danny Dyer won for Mr. Bigstuff in 2025.

=== 2010s ===
Year	Actor	Work	Character	Network
2010 (56th)
2010 (56th)	Peter Capaldi	The Thick of It	Malcolm Tucker	BBC Two
2010 (56th)	Simon Bird	The Inbetweeners	Will McKenzie	E4
2010 (56th)	Hugh Dennis	Outnumbered: The Christmas Special	Pete Brockman	BBC One
2010 (56th)	David Mitchell	Peep Show	Mark Corrigan	Channel 4
2011 (57th)
2011 (57th)	Steve Coogan	The Trip	Steve Coogan	BBC Two
2011 (57th)	James Buckley	The Inbetweeners	Jay Cartwright	E4
2011 (57th)	Tom Hollander	Rev.	Adam Smallbone	BBC Two
2011 (57th)	David Mitchell	Peep Show	Mark Corrigan	Channel 4
2012 (58th)
2012 (58th)	Darren Boyd	Spy	Tim Elliot	Sky One
2012 (58th)	Hugh Bonneville	Twenty Twelve	Ian Fletcher	BBC Four
2012 (58th)	Tom Hollander	Rev.	Adam Smallbone	BBC Two
2012 (58th)	Brendan O'Carroll	Mrs. Brown's Boys	Agnes Brown	BBC One
2013 (59th)
2013 (59th)	Steve Coogan	Alan Partridge: Welcome to the Places of My Life	Alan Partridge	Sky Atlantic
2013 (59th)	Hugh Bonneville	Twenty Twelve	Ian Fletcher	BBC Two
2013 (59th)	Peter Capaldi	The Thick of It	Malcolm Tucker	BBC Two
2013 (59th)	Greg Davies	Cuckoo	Ken Thompson	BBC Three
2014 (60th)
2014 (60th)	Richard Ayoade	The IT Crowd	Maurice Moss	Channel 4
2014 (60th)	Mathew Baynton	The Wrong Mans	Sam Pinkett	BBC Two
2014 (60th)	James Corden	The Wrong Mans	Phil Bourne	BBC Two
2014 (60th)	Chris O'Dowd	The IT Crowd	Roy Trenneman	Channel 4
2015 (61st)
2015 (61st)	Matt Berry	Toast of London	Steven Toast	Channel 4
2015 (61st)	Brendan O'Carroll	Mrs. Brown's Boys : The Christmas Special	Agnes Brown	BBC One
2015 (61st)	Hugh Bonneville	W1A	Ian Fletcher	BBC Two
2015 (61st)	Tom Hollander	Rev.	Adam Smallbone	BBC Two
2016 (62nd)
2016 (62nd)	Peter Kay	Peter Kay's Car Share	John Redmond	BBC One
2016 (62nd)	Hugh Bonneville	W1A	Ian Fletcher	BBC Two
2016 (62nd)	Javone Prince	The Javone Prince Show	Various Characters	BBC Three
2016 (62nd)	Toby Jones	Detectorists	Lance Stater	BBC Four
2017 (63rd)
2017 (63rd)	Steve Coogan	Alan Partridge's Scissored Isle	Alan Partridge	Sky Atlantic
2017 (63rd)	Asim Chaudhry	People Just Do Nothing	Chabuddy G	BBC Three
2017 (63rd)	Harry Enfield	The Windsors	Prince Charles	Channel 4
2017 (63rd)	David Mitchell	Upstart Crow	William Shakespeare	BBC Two
2018 (64th)
2018 (64th)	Toby Jones	Detectorists	Lance Stater	BBC Four
2018 (64th)	Rob Brydon	The Trip to Spain	Rob Brydon	Sky Atlantic
2018 (64th)	Asim Chaudhry	People Just Do Nothing	Chabuddy G	BBC Three
2018 (64th)	Samson Kayo	Famalam	Various Characters	BBC Three
2019 (65th)
2019 (65th)	Steve Pemberton	Inside No. 9	Various Characters	BBC Two
2019 (65th)	Jamie Demetriou	Stath Lets Flats	Stath Charalambos	Channel 4
2019 (65th)	Alex Macqueen	Sally4Ever	David	Sky Atlantic
2019 (65th)	Peter Mullan	Mum	Michael	BBC Two

=== 2020s ===
Year	Actor	Work	Character	Network
2020 (66th)	Jamie Demetriou	Stath Lets Flats	Stath Charalambos	Channel 4
2020 (66th)	Guz Khan	Man Like Mobeen	Mobeen	BBC Three
2020 (66th)	Ncuti Gatwa	Sex Education	Eric Effiong	Netflix
2020 (66th)	Youssef Kerkour	Home	Sami Ibrahim	Channel 4
2021 (67th)	Charlie Cooper	This Country	Lee "Kurtan" Mucklowe	BBC Three
2021 (67th)	Guz Khan	Man Like Mobeen	Mobeen	BBC Three
2021 (67th)	Joseph Gilgun	Brassic	Vincent "Vinnie" O'Neill	Sky One
2021 (67th)	Ncuti Gatwa	Sex Education	Eric Effiong	Netflix
2021 (67th)	Paul Ritter	Friday Night Dinner	Martin Goodman	Channel 4
2021 (67th)	Reece Shearsmith	Inside No.9	Various Characters	BBC Two
2022 (68th)	Jamie Demetriou	Stath Lets Flats	Stath Charalambos	Channel 4
2022 (68th)	Ncuti Gatwa	Sex Education	Eric Effiong	Netflix
2022 (68th)	Joseph Gilgun	Brassic	Vincent "Vinnie" O'Neill	Sky Comedy
2022 (68th)	Samson Kayo	Bloods	Maleek	Sky One
2022 (68th)	Steve Coogan	This Time with Alan Partridge	Alan Partridge	BBC One
2022 (68th)	Tim Renkow	Jerk	Tim	BBC Three
2023 (69th)	Lenny Rush	Am I Being Unreasonable?	Ollie	BBC One
2023 (69th)	Daniel Radcliffe	Weird: The Al Yankovic Story	"Weird Al" Yankovic	The Roku Channel
2023 (69th)	Jon Pointing	Big Boys	Danny	Channel 4
2023 (69th)	Joseph Gilgun	Brassic	Vincent "Vinnie" O'Neill	Sky Max
2023 (69th)	Matt Berry	What We Do in the Shadows	Laszlo Cravensworth	Disney+
2023 (69th)	Stephen Merchant	The Outlaws	Greg Dillard	BBC One
2024 (70th)	Mawaan Rizwan	Juice	Jamal "Jamma" Jamshidi	BBC Three
2024 (70th)	Adjani Salmon	Dreaming Whilst Black	Kwabena	BBC Three
2024 (70th)	David Tennant	Good Omens	Crowley	Prime Video
2024 (70th)	Hammed Animashaun	Black Ops	Kay	BBC One
2024 (70th)	Jamie Demetriou	A Whole Lifetime with Jamie Demetriou	Various characters	Netflix
2024 (70th)	Joseph Gilgun	Brassic	Vincent "Vinnie" O'Neill	Sky Max
2025 (71st)	Danny Dyer	Mr. Bigstuff	Lee	Sky Comedy
2025 (71st)	Bilal Hasna	Extraordinary	Kash	Disney+
2025 (71st)	Dylan Thomas-Smith	G'wed	Reece Duffy	ITV2
2025 (71st)	Nabhaan Rizwan	Kaos	Dionysus	Netflix
2025 (71st)	Oliver Savell	Changing Ends	Young Alan Carr	ITV1
2025 (71st)	Phil Dunning	Smoggie Queens	Dickie	BBC Three
2026 (72nd)	Steve Coogan	How Are You? It's Alan (Partridge)	Alan Partridge	BBC One
2026 (72nd)	Jim Howick	Here We Go	Paul Jessop	BBC One
2026 (72nd)	Jon Pointing	Big Boys	Danny	Channel 4
2026 (72nd)	Mawaan Rizwan	Juice	Jamal "Jamma" Jamshidi	BBC Three
2026 (72nd)	Lenny Rush	Am I Being Unreasonable?	Olly	BBC One
2026 (72nd)	Oliver Savell	Changing Ends	Young Alan Carr	ITV1

== Superlatives ==
Record	Actor	Programme	Age (in years)
Oldest winner	Steve Coogan	How Are You? It's Alan (Partridge)	60
Oldest nominee	Steve Coogan	How Are You? It's Alan (Partridge)	60
Youngest winner	Lenny Rush	Am I Being Unreasonable?	14
Youngest nominee	Lenny Rush	Am I Being Unreasonable?	14

== Actors with multiple wins and nominations ==
=== Multiple wins ===
4 wins

- Steve Coogan

2 wins

- Jamie Demetriou

=== Multiple nominations ===
The following people have been nominated for the British Academy Television Award for Best Male Comedy Performance multiple times:

5 nominations

- Steve Coogan

4 nominations

- Hugh Bonneville
- Jamie Demetriou
- Joseph Gilgun

3 nominations

- Ncuti Gatwa
- Tom Hollander
- David Mitchell

2 nominations

- Matt Berry
- Peter Capaldi
- Asim Chaudhry
- Toby Jones
- Samson Kayo
- Brendan O'Carroll
- Jon Pointing
- Mawaan Rizwan
- Lenny Rush
- Oliver Savell

== Programmes with multiple wins and nominations ==
=== Multiple nominations ===
4 nominations

- Brassic

3 nominations

- Rev.
- Sex Education
- Stath Lets Flats

2 nominations

- Am I Being Unreasonable?
- Big Boys
- Changing Ends
- Detectorists
- The Inbetweeners
- Inside No. 9
- The IT Crowd
- Juice
- Man Like Mobeen
- Mrs. Brown's Boys
- People Just Do Nothing
- The Thick of It
- Twenty Twelve
- The Wrong Mans
- W1A
