= Emily Lloyd-Saini =

British comedian, writer and actor

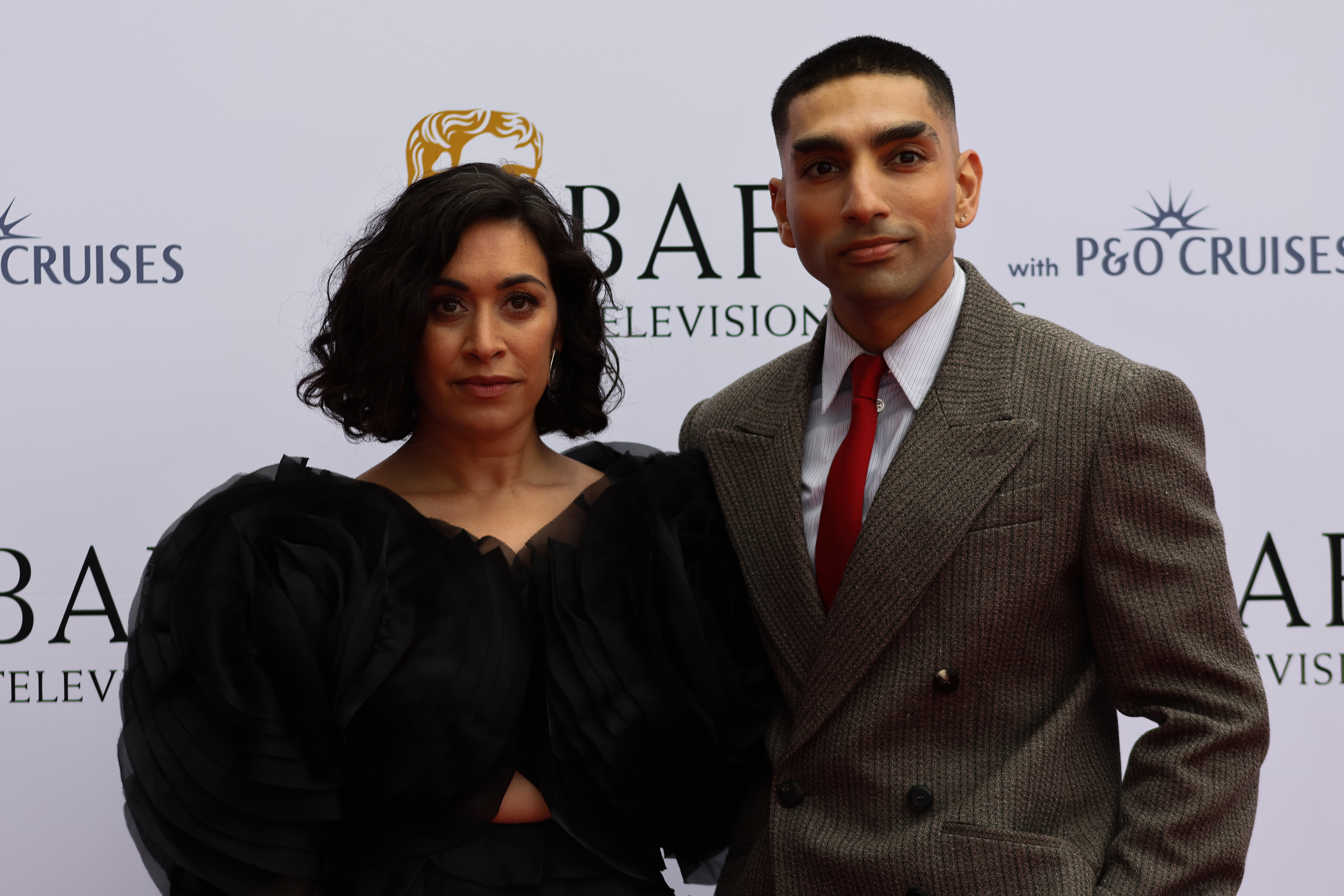
- Lloyd-Saini and Mawaan Rizwan at the 2026 British Academy Television Awards
- Born: Emily Jane Lloyd-Saini; 1984 (age 41–42); Nottingham, England
- Education: Oxford School of Drama
- Years active: 2011–present
- Children: 1

Emily Jane Lloyd-Saini (born 1984) is a British comedian, actress, broadcaster and writer. She is known for her comedy duo EGG, with Anna Leong Brophy.

== Early life ==
Lloyd-Saini was born in Nottingham. She is a graduate of the Oxford School of Drama under George Peck.

== Career ==
In January 2017, Lloyd-Saini began a weekly show with Mawaan Rizwan on the BBC Asian Network. As part of sketch duo EGG (with Anna Leong Brophy) she performed at the Edinburgh Fringe in 2016, 2018. and 2023.

She starred as Winnie in both series of BBC's BAFTA nominated show Juice. Lloyd-Saini also wrote on the series with comedian and actor Mawaan Rizwan.

Other credits include Motherland, Carastrophe, ITV2's Buffering, and DI Ryle in Sky One's Code 404. She also appeared in the final series of popular British comedy, Brassic. Lloyd-Saini was a panellist on BBC Two's Mock The Week in December 2021 and has appeared as a stand up on the BBC and Stand Up Central.

Lloyd-Saini's has also played various roles in CBBC's Horrible Histories, and Horrible Science.

In November 2022 she appeared opposite Kristen Bell as "Moffy" in the Amazon film, The People We Hate At The Wedding.

She stars in the 2026 feature film Wicker.

== Personal life ==
Lloyd-Saini has a daughter. Lloyd-Saini is a Virgo.
