= Nabhaan Rizwan =

British actor (born 1997)

- Born: 7 February 1997 (age 29); Essex, England
- Occupation: Actor
- Years active: 2017–present
- Relatives: Mawaan Rizwan (brother)

Nabhaan Rizwan (born 7 February 1997) is a British actor.

== Early life ==
Rizwan was born in the London Borough of Redbridge to Pakistani parents. Rizwan's mother, Shahnaz (née Ghazi) was a child actress and also starred as an adult in the Indian soap opera Yeh Hai Mohabbatein in the role of Santosh "Toshi" Bhalla. His father was a playwright and his brother, Mawaan, is an actor, writer and comedian. As a child in Ilford, his mother encouraged the performing arts, but Rizwan was initially more interested in playing cricket than acting. After completing his A-Levels, he did youth work and acted in theatre groups. His first audition landed him a starring role in 2018 BBC drama Informer.

== Career ==
Rizwan's known for crime drama Informer, his supporting roles in The Accident and 1917, and the miniseries Station Eleven. More recently, he portrays Noa alongside Aimee Lou Wood in the 2025 series Film Club, and Dionysus in the 2024 series Kaos. For Kaos, Rizwan was nominated for the 2025 British Academy Television Awards for Best Male Comedy Performance. In the same year, he was also nominated for the BAFTA Rising Star Award. Rizwan is also a rapper under the alias El Huxley.

== Personal life ==
Rizwan lives in London.

== Filmography ==
=== Film ===
Year	Title	Role	Ref.
2019	1917	Sepoy Jondalar	
2020	Mogul Mowgli	RPG	
2021	The Last Letter from Your Lover	Rory	
2023	In Camera	Aden	
2026	Wicker	The Tailor	

=== Television ===
Year	Title	Role	Notes	Ref.
2018	Informer	Raza Shar	6 episodes	
2019	The Accident	Tim Das	4 episodes	
2020	Industry	Hari Dhar	2 episodes	
2021–2022	Station Eleven	Frank Chaudhary	10 episodes	
2023–present	Juice	Isaac Jamshidi	12 episodes; also writer	
2024	Kaos	Dionysus	Main role	
2025	Film Club	Noa	Main role	
2025	Dope Girls	Silas Huxley	Main role	
2026	Agatha Christie's Seven Dials	Ronnie Devereux	3 episodes	
2026	Bait	Salim	2 episodes	
TBA	Assassin's Creed	TBA	Main role	

=== Theatre ===
Year	Title	Role	Notes	Ref.
2021	Anna X	Ariel	Performed at Harold Pinter Theatre and The Lowry	

=== Music videos ===
Year	Title	Artist	Ref.
2022	"Are You Checking Me Out or Are You Just a Racist"	Mawaan Rizwan	
2025	"All Over Me"	Haim	
