= George Peck (theatre) =

English theatre director

George Peck is an English theatre director. He founded the Oxford School of Drama. He was the school's Principal from its inception in 1987 until August 2019.

== Early life and education ==
He was educated at Uppingham School and studied English literature at St Catherine's College, Oxford. After university he played a variety of roles in repertory theatre ranging from Shakespeare to pantomime before joining the Royal Theatre Northampton as part of the Arts Council's Regional Trainee Directors Scheme.

== Career ==
He became artistic director of the Royal Touring Theatre which operated out of the Royal Theatre Northampton (now Royal & Derngate) for whom his productions included The Ballad of Mrs Beeton (music George Fenton), Sherlock's Last Case by Charles Marowitz, Pericles, Prince of Tyre and The Duchess of Malfi.

== The Oxford School of Drama ==
In 1987 he established The Oxford School of Drama on an eighteenth century farm, now Sansomes Farm Studios. The house and agricultural buildings were once part of the Blenheim Palace Estate in Woodstock. While the school was developing he combined running the school with teaching in Oxford for various colleges as well as privately. His students included Sam Mendes, Kirsty Allsop, William Cash (author and journalist) and Frances Stonor Saunders. Later he was able to concentrate exclusively on developing The Oxford School of Drama where he combined Head of Acting teaching responsibilities with his role as Principal. Throughout his Principalship, the school remained independent of a Higher Education Institution, funded through the Government's Dance and Drama Award Scheme. This enabled the school to accept a wide diversity of students without the need for academic qualifications.

Peck's main areas of expertise included the living language of theatre, in particular the work of Shakespeare and contemporary writers. Students from the school achieved success in work that demanded a high level of linguistic skill, with many succeeding as writers as well as actors. Peck's work particularly concentrated on the One Year Acting Course which offered acting training to university graduates. Peck also directed productions including the first ever stage adaptation of Ted Hughes' Crow poems at BAC, The American Clock at Pegasus Theatre Oxford and cabaret at The Crazy Coqs at Brasserie Zédel. In 2011, Peck and designer Ruth Paton co-curated an exhibition entitled Work of Art at Redchurch Street Gallery and Studio1.1 in Shoreditch. Film director Christopher Swann and photographer Jessica Forde were part of the creative team for the exhibition which used films, audio recordings and students' personal reflections in an exploration of their training.

Under Peck's tenure The Oxford School of Drama received over a decade of Grade 1 'Outstanding' ratings in its Ofsted inspections. The school was picked as one of the top five drama schools in the UK by the BBC in 2004, and in 2015 as one of the top five in the world by the US website Acting in London. It was the first drama school to receive "Beacon" status from the minister for higher and further education.

The school's students and graduates have won a number of awards, including a Golden Globe Award in 2017 and Screen Actors Guild Awards in 2017 and 2018 for Claire Foy as Best Actress in a Drama Series for The Crown, BAFTA Cymru Award as Best Actor for Celyn Jones in Manhunt (2019 TV series), Perrier Award for Will Adamsdale, Edinburgh Comedy Awards for Richard Gadd and the Society of London Theatre's Laurence Olivier Bursary Award, the BBC's Carleton Hobbs Bursary Award and The Spotlight Prize.

Notable graduates of the school taught by Peck include actors: Charity Wakefield, Annabel Scholey, Claire Foy, Christina Cole, Andrew Gower (actor), Sophie Cookson, Jude Owusu, Jemma Powell, Lydia Rose Bewley, Alexandra Dowling, Lee Boardman, Freddy Carter, Samantha Colley, Louise Marwood, Tanya Reynolds, Kiran Sonia Sawar, Nell Hudson, Babou Ceesay; writer/actors: Richard Gadd, Ella Road, Will Adamsdale, Catherine Steadman, Adura Onashile, Gaby Best, Emily Lloyd-Saini, Celyn Jones; writers: Penelope Skinner, Luke Barnes, Lucy Strange; producer Richard Jordan; Casting Director Annelie Powell; and the late James Menzies Kitchin in whose memory the JMK Trust was established.

== Cameron Mackintosh Professor of Contemporary Theatre ==
Peck was employed to help run the Cameron Mackintosh Professor of Contemporary Theatre at the University of Oxford from its inception until 2003. Professors included Stephen Sondheim, Ian McKellen, Thelma Holt, Arthur Miller, Michael Codron and Alan Ayckbourn.

Peck retired from The Oxford School of Drama in August 2019.
