= Mawaan Rizwan =

British actor (born 1992)

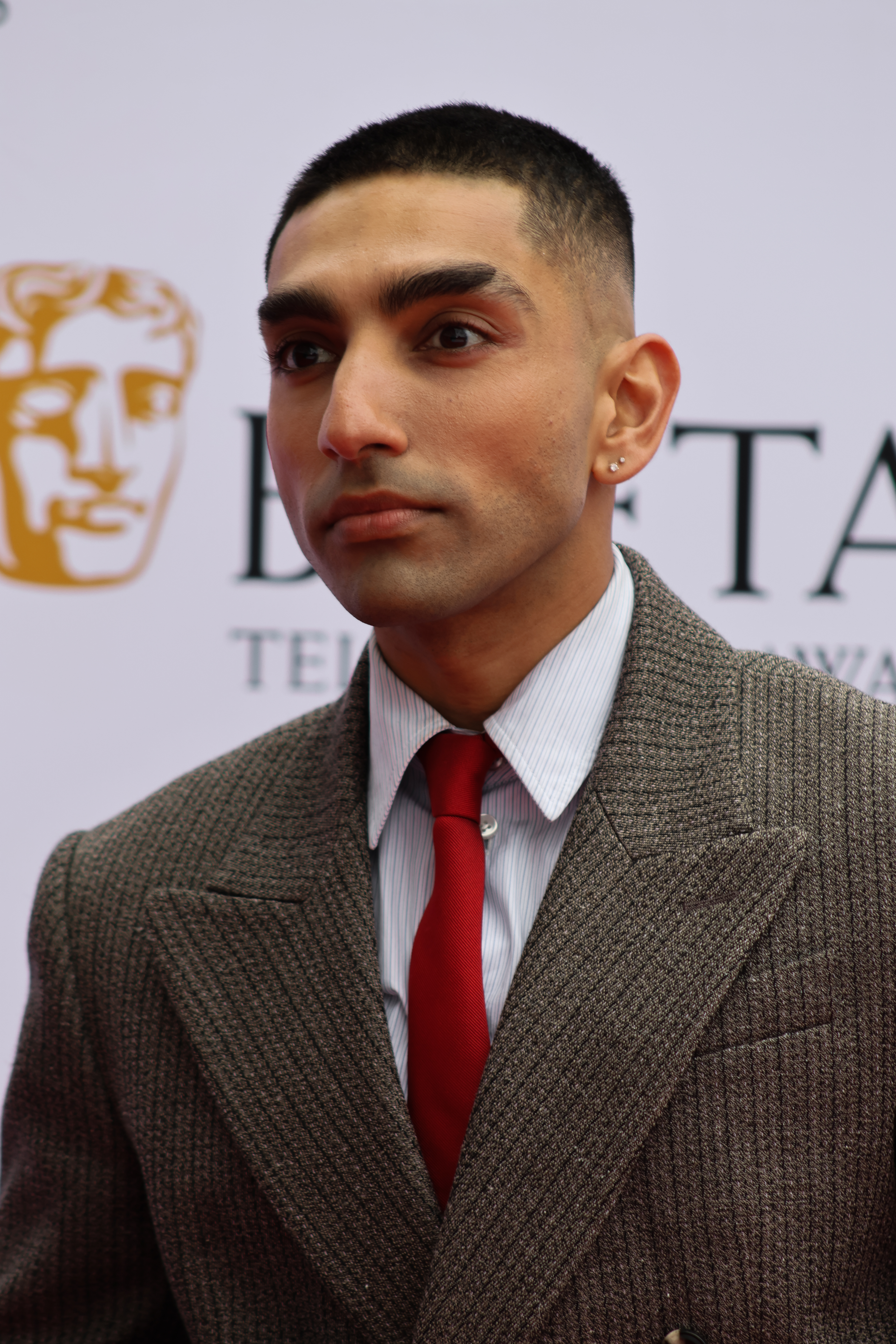
- Mawaan Rizwan at the 2026 British Academy Television Awards
- Born: 18 August 1992 (age 34); Lahore, Punjab, Pakistan
- Citizenship: United Kingdom
- Occupations: Actor; comedian; director; screenwriter
- Years active: 2008–present
- Relatives: Nabhaan Rizwan (brother)
- Website: mawaan.co.uk

Mawaan Rizwan (born 18 August 1992) is a Pakistani-born British actor and comedian who began his career as a YouTuber. He created and starred in the BBC Three comedy Juice (2023). He won a British Academy Television Award for his performance, in addition to receiving writing nominations.

== Early life ==
Rizwan was born in Lahore, Pakistan; his mother, Shahnaz, was one of nine siblings and had starred in a number of black and white Pakistani films. As his mother desired a better life for Mawaan and his sister, they emigrated to London in 1994. Six years later, at the age of eight, Rizwan and his family were threatened with deportation, but were granted indefinite leave to remain after legal battles and protests for the family's immigration rights.

== Career ==
Rizwan started making YouTube videos at the age of 16. The attention he received for these resulted in him gaining roles on various television and streaming programming. In 2013 he began starring in the BAFTA award nominated series DNN: Definitely Not Newsround, a spoof news comedy series for children. In 2015 he starred in Disney XD UK series Mega Awesome Super Hacks alongside Oli White and Jimmy Hill.

In 2015, Rizwan travelled to Pakistan, his country of birth, to film the documentary How Gay Is Pakistan? which explores the issues faced by other LGBTQ Muslims living under Islamic law that deems homosexuality illegal. The documentary was televised internationally, including on ABC2 in Australia, CBC in Canada and in various markets via Amazon Prime Video.

Rizwan's career in stand-up comedy began in 2010 when he performed his first gig at a basement venue in Leicester Square. He trained at the prestigious École Philippe Gaulier, physicality and silliness being key components of his comedic craft. He performed at the Edinburgh Festival Fringe, with his 2018 and 2019 performances gaining positive reviews from critics. In 2018, Rizwan participated in a charity benefit event called Choose Laughs? at the Playhouse Theatre to support the NGO Help Refugees.

In April 2019, Rizwan released his first two singles – "I've Got a New Walk" and "Mango" – with a third single, "Never Been Skiing", released in September.

In 2020, Rizwan starred in the Sky One comedy series Two Weeks to Live. Forbes named Rizwan one of their '30 under 30' movers for their 2020 list, after recognition for being a writer on Netflix series Sex Education as well as his role in BBC Three drama Murdered by My Father and opening for Queer Eye's Jonathan Van Ness on tour. In September 2020 he appeared in Jonathan Ross's Comedy Club as co-host. Also in 2020, he appeared in the 10th series of Taskmaster, finishing 3rd.

In 2021, Rizwan was appointed as Young Person's Comedy Laureate by the BBC as well as head judge of BBC New Comedy Award. In 2022, he appeared on Channel 4's 40th Anniversary special of Saturday Live (retitled as Friday Night Live), performing his song "Are You Checking Me Out Or Are You Just A Racist?" The song was later released as a single across music streaming platforms, with an official music video released in December the same year, featuring Nabhaan Rizwan, his "more famous brother" referred to in the lyrics.

In September 2023, Juice was released – a BBC Three surreal comedy series which Rizwan starred in, wrote, and co-produced. The series is based upon Rizwan's 2018 Edinburgh Fringe show of the same name. Rizwan's mother and brother also appeared in Juice as the family of Rizwan's character, Jamma. On its release The Guardian commented that "His [Mawaan's] childlike way of exploring life's complexities has won him legions of fans". A second series was released in 2025.

In March 2024, Rizwan appeared on Comic Relief on BBC Two, performing a country version of "Are You Checking Me Out Or Are You Just A Racist?".

In April and May 2026, Rizwan appeared at Royal Shakespeare Company playing The Barker / Giri in The Resistible Rise of Arturo Ui by Bertolt Brecht in a new version by Stephen Sharkey, alongside Mark Gatiss in the title role and directed by Seán Linnen at the Swan Theatre, Stratford-upon-Avon.

In winter 2027, Rizwan will play Guildenstern opposite George Fouracres in Rosencrantz and Guildenstern Are Dead at the Lyttleton Theatre at the Royal National Theatre, directed by Robert Hastie.

== Personal life ==
Rizwan is gay, having come out to his traditional Muslim parents at the age of 24. In 2012, he appeared alongside his mother, Shahnaz, in a YouTube video which resulted in his mother gaining the attention of Bollywood and eventually landing a role in the Indian television series Yeh Hai Mohabbatein (This Is Love).

Mawaan's brother, Nabhaan, also followed the family into a career in acting with his debut in BBC drama series Informer.

== Filmography ==
=== Television ===
Year	Title	Role	Network	Notes
2013	DNN: Definitely Not Newsround	Jahmene Mann	CBBC	13 episodes
2013	Project: Library	Jason	YouTube	4 episodes
2014–2016	The Dog Ate My Homework	Himself	CBBC	2 episodes
2015	Mega Awesome Super Hacks	Himself	Disney XD UK	(6 episodes)
2015	How Gay Is Pakistan?	Himself	BBC Three	Documentary
2016	The Break	Actor	Netflix	Tying the Knot (1 episode)
2016	Murdered by My Father	Imi	BBC Three	TV movie
2016	Getting High For God	Himself	BBC Three	2-Part Documentary
2017	Loaded	Duncan	Channel 4	(1 episode)
2017	five by five	Alex	BBC Three	mini-series (2 episodes)
2017	Vera	Jamil	ITV	Natural Selection (1 episode)
2018	Next of Kin	Omar Shirani	ITV	mini-series (6 episodes)
2018	The Big Asian Stand-Up	Himself	BBC Two	(1 episode)
2019	Live at the Apollo	Himself	BBC One	(1 episode)
2019	Harry Hill's Clubnite	Himself	Channel 4	(1 episode)
2019	The One Show	Himself	BBC One	(1 episode)
2020	Taskmaster	Himself	Channel 4	Series 10
2020	Jonathan Ross' Comedy Club	Himself	ITV	(5 episodes)
2020	Two Weeks to Live	Nicky	Sky One	(6 episodes)
2021	BBC New Comedy Award	Himself	BBC Three	Head judge of the competition
2022	The Great Celebrity Bake Off For Stand Up To Cancer	Himself	Channel 4	Series 5; episode 5
2022	The Big Fat Quiz of Everything	Himself	Channel 4	2022 special
2022	Friday Night Live	Himself	Channel 4	Channel 4's 40th anniversary special of Saturday Live
2023	Doctor Who	Mr Castavillian	BBC One	Mini-episode: "Destination: Skaro"
2023–2025	Juice	Jamal "Jamma" Jamshidi	BBC Three	(12 episodes)
2024	Comic Relief	Himself	BBC Two	
2026	The Split Up	Ashok Singh	BBC One	(6 episodes)
2027	Hercule	TBA	BBC One	Upcoming six-part series

=== Film ===
Year	Title	Role	Notes / Refs
2013	Ashens and the Quest for the GameChild	Iqbal/Old Woman	
2014	The Nightman of Nevermore	JP	
2016	The Darkest Dawn	Ricky	
2017	Carnage	Freddy Jayashankar	
2018	Benjamin	Dhani	
2025	Tinsel Town	Nigel	Television film; broadcast on Sky Cinema
2025	Blackout	Reuben	Short film by Chris Urch; premiered at the 2025 Iris Film Festival

=== Screenwriting credits ===
Year	Title	Network	Notes
2011	Jimmy Will Play		Short film
2014	Swashbuckle	CBeebies	(3 episodes)
2016	Spot Bots	CBeebies	(7 episodes)
2017–19	Apple Tree House	CBeebies	(4 episodes)
2020–21	Sex Education	Netflix	(2 episodes)
2023–present	Juice	BBC Three	(12 episodes)

=== Theatre ===
Year	Title	Role	Venue	Notes
2024	ECHO (Every Cold-Hearted Oxygen)	Performer	Royal Court Theatre	Performed on 24 July as a member of the rolling cast
2024	The Rocky Horror Show	The Narrator	Dominion Theatre	Performed on 6-20 September
2025	Inside No. 9 Stage/Fright	Guest star	Regent Theatre, Stoke-on-Trent	One night only - 15 November evening
2026	The Resistible Rise of Arturo Ui	The Barker / Giri	Swan Theatre, Stratford-upon-Avon	
2027	Rosencrantz and Guildenstern Are Dead	Guildenstern	Lyttleton Theatre, Royal National Theatre	

== Discography ==
=== Singles ===
- Released in 2019:
  - "I've Got a New Walk"
  - "Mango"
  - "Never Been Skiing"
- Released in 2022:
  - Are you Checking Me out or Are you Just a Racist?
- Released in 2024:
  - Are you Checking Me out or Are you Just a Racist? (Country Version) - Live from the Palladium

== Awards and nominations ==
Year	Award	Category	Work	Result	Ref.
2011	Best of Boroughs Film Awards	Audience Award	Jimmy Will Play	Won	
2024	Attitude Awards	Comedy	Body of work	Won	
2024	British Academy Television Awards	Best Male Comedy Performance	Juice	Won	
2024	British Academy Television Craft Awards	Best Writer: Comedy	Juice	Nominated	
2024	British Academy Television Craft Awards	Best Emerging Talent: Fiction	Juice	Nominated	
2026	British Academy Television Awards	Best Male Comedy Performance	Juice	Nominated	
