= How Are You? It's Alan (Partridge) =

British comedy television series

- Genre: Comedy
- Written by: Neil Gibbons Rob Gibbons; Steve Coogan
- Directed by: Neil Gibbons; Rob Gibbons
- Starring: Steve Coogan; Felicity Montagu; Katherine Kelly
- Country of origin: United Kingdom
- Original language: English
- No. of series: 1
- No. of episodes: 6

Production
- Producer: Joe Fraser
- Running time: 28 minutes
- Production company: Baby Cow

Original release
- Network: BBC One
- Release: 3 October – 7 November 2025

How Are You? It's Alan (Partridge) is a BBC Comedy mockumentary series starring Steve Coogan as Alan Partridge. It was directed by Neil and Rob Gibbons, written by Coogan with Neil and Rob Gibbons, and produced by Baby Cow.

== Synopsis ==
The six-part series follows Alan Partridge exploring mental health issues after losing his job with the BBC and fainting during a corporate event.

== Cast ==
- Steve Coogan as Alan Partridge
- Felicity Montagu as Lynn Benfield
- Tim Key as Sidekick Simon
- Katherine Kelly as Katrina

== Production ==
Produced by Steve Coogan's Baby Cow production company, the series was written by Coogan's long-term collaborators the Gibbons brothers. The six-part series made up of 30 minute episodes involves an exploration of mental health problems facing the United Kingdom. It was originally conceived following the first series of This Time with Alan Partridge in 2019 as a travel documentary series similar in concept to Alan Partridge's Scissored Isle (2015), under the title And Did Those Feet. This iteration of the series was revealed publicly after Coogan opposed a driving ban on the grounds of being required to drive to participate in filming. Filming was ultimately cancelled due to the COVID-19 pandemic, and a second series of This Time was produced in 2021.

Filming for And Did Those Feet... with Alan Partridge eventually began in the south of England in May 2024. In January 2025, Coogan announced that filming was complete and the series' title had changed to How Are You?, reflecting its exploration of mental health. In August 2025, the title was confirmed as How Are You? It's Alan (Partridge).

== Broadcast ==
The series commenced broadcasting on 3 October 2025. The Guardian critic Jack Seale gave it four out of five, writing that "the subject matter here allows for the glimpses into Alan’s soul that have been there ever since the Gibbons brothers took over co-writing duties". In Australia the series is available on HBO Max.

=== Accolades ===
At the 2026 British Academy Television Awards, the series received a nomination for Best Scripted Comedy and Coogan was nominated for, and won, Best Male Comedy Performance. Coogan was nominated for Best Comedy Performance at the Royal Television Society Programme Awards in March 2026, with the series nominated for scripted comedy.
