= Oliver Savell =

English actor (born 2009)

- Born: 19 December 2009 (age 16)
- Occupation: Actor
- Television: Changing Ends

Oliver Savell (born 19 December 2009) is an English child actor. He stars in the ITVX sitcom Changing Ends (2023–present), for which he has twice been nominated for the BAFTA TV Award for Best Male Comedy Performance.

== Career ==
He made his professional stage debut in Appropriate in 2019, and later played Harry in Force Majeure at the Donmar Warehouse. He appeared as Ronnie Boyd in Kenneth Branagh film Belfast in 2021. He appeared in the 2023 horror film The Piper alongside Julian Sands.

He was cast the lead role of a young Alan Carr in Carr's Northamptonshire-set biographical comedy series Changing Ends in 2022. Carr discussed looking at 450 audition tapes for the role but described Savell’s audition saying that he "was spot on with the intelligence, the timing and everything. We closed the door, jumped for joy, and we said, 'We got him'." The first series was broadcast in 2023. He reprised the role for a second series in 2024. For his "star-making performance" he was described as a "remarkable talent" by The Daily Telegraph, and having a "preternatural gift for performance" by The Independent, with The Guardian calling his performance "fantastic" and that he "manages to embody the real Carr without it seeming like an impersonation". ITV reported that the first two series had been streamed thirteen million times from ITVX and was renewed for third and fourth series in November 2024. He won for Best Comedy Performance at the Royal Television Society Programme Awards in March 2025. He was nominated again in that category the following year. In 2025 and 2026, he was nominated for the British Academy Television Award for Best Male Comedy Performance.

In March 2026 it was announced he was to take the title role in the BBC adaptation of the Sue Townsend 1982 novel The Secret Diary of Adrian Mole, Aged 13¾.

== Personal life ==
He is from Surrey.

His cat is named Alan after Alan Carr himself.

== Filmography ==
Year	Title	Role	Notes
2021	Belfast	Ronnie Boyd	Feature film
2023	The Piper	Colin	Film
2023–present	Changing Ends	Young Alan Carr	Lead role
2026	The Secret Diary of Adrian Mole, Aged 13¾	Adrian Mole	Lead role
2027	The Night of Broken Glass	Anton Krutzfeld	Upcoming
