= Aimee Lou Wood =

English actress and writer (born 1994)

- Wood in 2026
- Born: 3 February 1994 (age 32); Stockport, Greater Manchester, England
- Education: Royal Academy of Dramatic Art (BA)
- Occupations: Actress; writer
- Years active: 2016–present

Aimee Lou Wood (born 3 February 1994) is an English actress and writer. She began her career on stage, appearing in productions of Mary Stuart (2016–2017) and People, Places and Things (2017). Her screen debut came with the Netflix comedy series Sex Education (2019–2023), winning the BAFTA Television Award for Best Female Comedy Performance. While starring on Sex Education, she appeared in the West End productions Uncle Vanya (2020) and Cabaret (2023), and in the films The Electrical Life of Louis Wain (2021) and Living (2022).

Wood was nominated for the BAFTA Rising Star Award in 2023. She starred in the comedy series Daddy Issues (2024–present) and the drama series The White Lotus (2025), the latter of which brought her nominations for the Actor Award, Primetime Emmy Award and Golden Globe Award for Best Supporting Actress. She also created and starred in the BBC Three television series Film Club (2025).

== Early life and education ==
Aimee Lou Wood was born on 3 February 1994 in Stockport, Greater Manchester, and grew up in the large village of Bramhall. Her mother works for Childline and her father is a car dealer. Her sister Emily Wood is a makeup artist.

Following their parents' divorce, Wood attended Cheadle Hulme School. She then took a foundation course at the Oxford School of Drama, and went on to graduate with a bachelor of arts in acting from the Royal Academy of Dramatic Art in 2017.

== Career ==
=== 2016–2020: Stage roles and Sex Education ===
Wood began her professional acting career in 2016 by working on stage productions, making her debut as a handmaiden in the play Mary Stuart, performed at the Almeida Theatre in London until 2017. Following this, she starred as Laura in the production People, Places and Things, a role that she performed numerous times on tour across the UK.

In 2019, Wood made her screen debut as Aimee Gibbs, a main character in the Netflix comedy-drama series Sex Education, where she co-starred alongside Asa Butterfield, Emma Mackey, Ncuti Gatwa, and Gillian Anderson. She had originally auditioned for the part of Lily Iglehart, which was ultimately given to Tanya Reynolds, but accepted the role of Aimee when she was offered it. The series went on to receive critical acclaim, and Wood's performance earned praise.

At the 2021 British Academy Television Awards, she won the British Academy Television Award for Best Female Comedy Performance, which is both her first accolade and her first award received from a major association; she earned another nomination for the award at the 2022 British Academy Television Awards. Amidst her work on Sex Education, Wood has continued to take roles in theatre, reasoning, "I know a lot of screen actors who think they left it too long to go back on stage and now they have really bad stage fright."

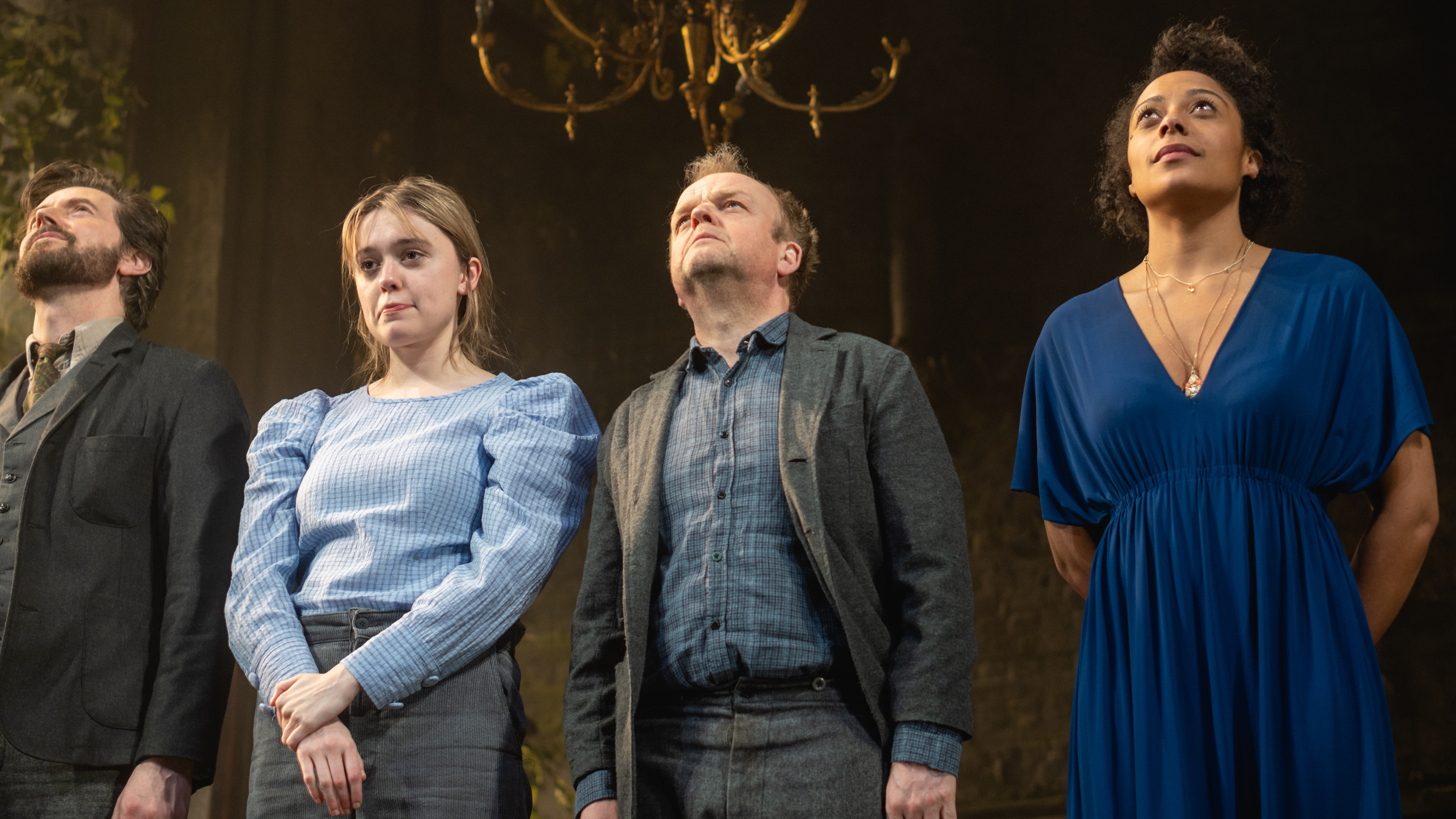
Wood (second from left) performing in Uncle Vanya in 2020

In 2020, Wood played Jess in Hen, a short film directed by James Larkin. That same year, she was cast as Sonya Serebryakova in Uncle Vanya, which was recorded during the COVID-19 pandemic at the Harold Pinter Theatre, and obtained both a cinematic release and a BBC national release in the same year. The production and Wood's performance were lauded by critics. Of her portrayal of Sonya, WhatsOnStage wrote, "she is a glorious, kind, gentle girl ... Her attempts at cheerfulness in the face of so much crushing disappointment are almost unbearable. [Wood] positively shines." Wood narrated an audiobook of Wuthering Heights by Emily Brontë, released 3 September 2020 by Penguin Audio.

=== 2021–present: Film debut and The White Lotus ===
In 2021, Wood joined the jury of the British Short Film Awards and announced the winner later that year. She made her feature-film debut as Claire Wain in the 2021 biographical film The Electrical Life of Louis Wain, which earned positive reviews from critics. She landed her first lead film role opposite Bill Nighy in the Oliver Hermanus drama feature Living, a British remake of the 1952 Japanese film Ikiru, which premiered at the 2022 Sundance Film Festival and earned acclaim. Wood replaced Mia Goth for upcoming thriller film Sweet Dreams, when she played Dorothy.

In January 2024, Wood joined the cast of the third season of the HBO anthology series The White Lotus, which premiered in February 2025. In April 2025, Wood criticised the NBC sketch comedy series Saturday Night Live after a scene in the sketch "The White POTUS", a parody of The White Lotus, had actress Sarah Sherman disparagingly portray Wood's character, Chelsea. Wood posted on her Instagram story shortly after the sketch aired, calling it "mean and unfunny", adding "...there must be a cleverer, more nuanced, less cheap way." SNL members Bowen Yang and Sherman came to Wood's defence, with Sherman sending Wood a bouquet of flowers as an apology.

On 31 October 2025 it was announced that Wood will be portraying Pattie Boyd in The Beatles – A Four-Film Cinematic Event directed by Sam Mendes, due to be released in April 2028.

== Personal life ==
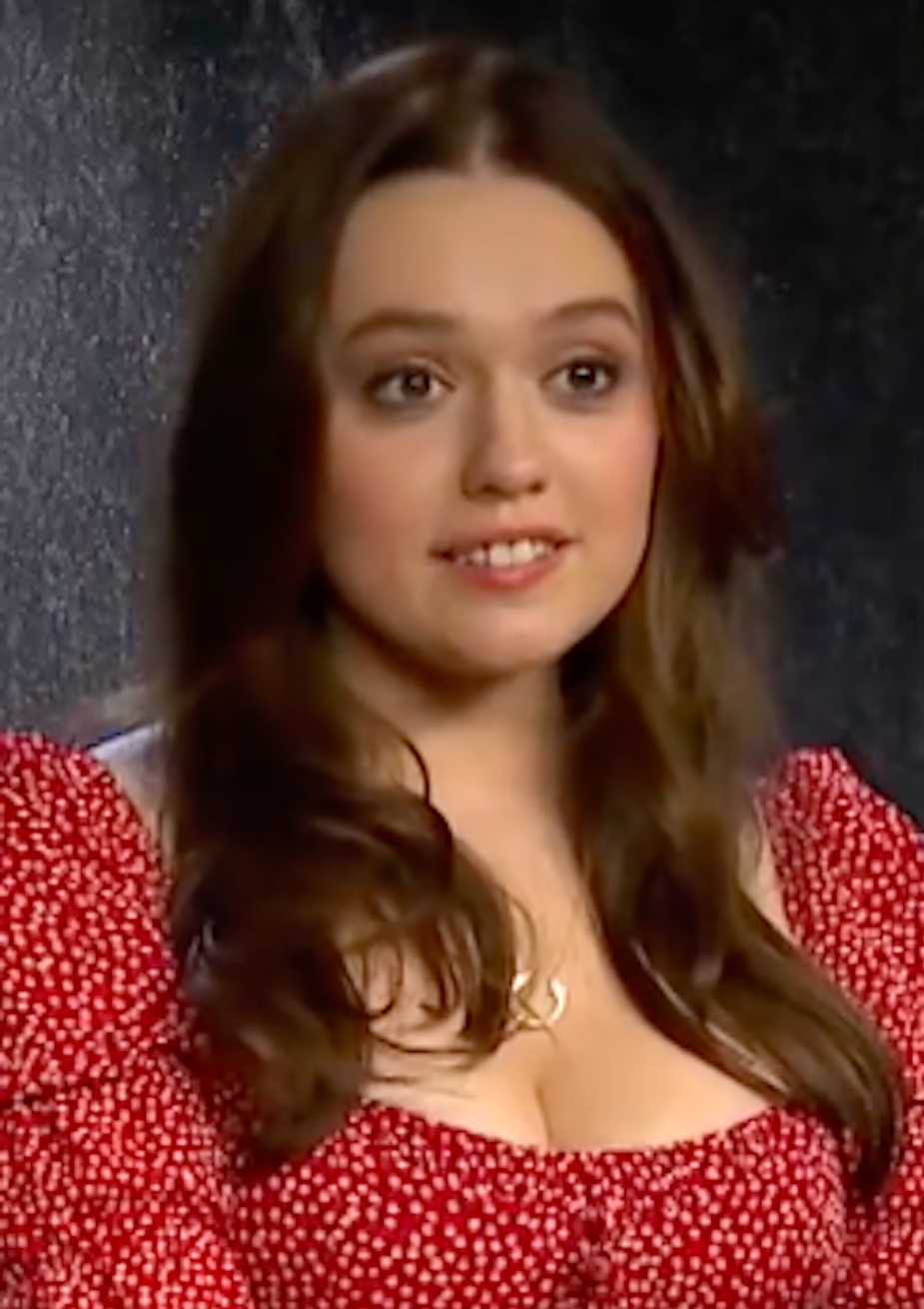
Wood in January 2019

Wood resides in South East London. She was in a relationship with her Sex Education co-star Connor Swindells, who portrays Adam Groff in the series, from January 2019 to March 2020.

Wood's godfather is the former Republic of Ireland footballer and manager Mick McCarthy.

Wood has spoken about her struggles with body image, saying in a 2020 interview with Glamour, "I have suffered with body dysmorphia my whole life. I remember before the first sex scene, I thought, 'Right, okay. I'll start eating salads every day,' and I just didn't. That was such a turning point for me, making that decision to go, 'Actually, I'm not going to alter how my body looks before this scene because this is how my body looks.'" Wood has shared how British model Georgia May Jagger's role as the face of Rimmel London in 2009 helped her build self-confidence and embrace her distinctive teeth, a feature that had made her a target of bullying. "Georgia Jagger did 'get the London look' and she had the gap teeth, that was a huge moment. I thought 'No, I am going to put red lipstick on and I am going to draw attention to it.'"

In an April 2025 interview with The Sunday Times, Wood revealed she had been diagnosed with ADHD a few years prior in addition to "autistic traits", and was advised to seek a formal autism assessment.

=== Activism ===
Wood is vocal about a number of political issues online, saying she does not fear the backlash she receives for it. In light of the 2023 Gaza war, Wood was one of over two thousand to sign an Artists for Palestine letter calling for a ceasefire and accusing Western governments of "not only tolerating war crimes but aiding and abetting them." She has signed the Artists4Ceasefire letter addressed to then U.S. President Joe Biden, and a 2025 pledge to boycott Israeli film institutions "implicated in genocide and apartheid".

Wood is a signatory of the Film Workers for Palestine boycott pledge that was published in September 2025.

== Filmography ==
=== Film ===
Key
†	Denotes works that have not yet been released

Year	Title	Role	Notes	Ref.
2021	The Electrical Life of Louis Wain	Claire Wain		
2022	Living	Margaret Harris		
2024	Seize Them!	Queen Dagan		
2026	The Idiot(s)	Anna Dostoevskaya		
2028	The Beatles – A Four-Film Cinematic Event †	Pattie Boyd	Filming	
TBA	Anxious People †	Grace	Post-production	

=== Television ===
Year	Title	Role	Notes	Ref.
2019–2023	Sex Education	Aimee Gibbs	Main role, 32 episodes	
2024	Alice & Jack	Maya	Miniseries	
2024–present	Daddy Issues	Gemma	Main role; also executive producer	
2025	The White Lotus	Chelsea	Main role; season 3	
2025	Toxic Town	Tracey Taylor	Miniseries	
2025	Film Club	Evie	Main role; also co-creator, writer and executive producer	
2026	Saturday Night Live UK	Herself / Host	Episodes: "Aimee Lou Wood / MEEK", "Ncuti Gatwa/Holly Humberstone"	

=== Stage ===
Year	Title	Role	Notes	Ref.
2016–2017	Mary Stuart	Handmaiden	Almeida Theatre, London	
2017	People, Places and Things	Laura	UK tour	
2018–2019	Downstate	Effie	Steppenwolf Upstairs Theatre, Chicago; Royal National Theatre, London	
2020	Uncle Vanya	Sonya Serebryakova	Harold Pinter Theatre, London	
2023	Cabaret	Sally Bowles	Playhouse Theatre, London	

== Accolades ==
Award	Year	Category	Work	Result	Ref.
Actor Awards	2026	Outstanding Performance by a Female Actor in a Drama Series	The White Lotus	Nominated	
Actor Awards	2026	Outstanding Performance by an Ensemble in a Drama Series	The White Lotus	Nominated	
British Academy Film Awards	2023	EE Rising Star Award	—N/a	Nominated	
British Academy Television Awards	2021	Best Female Comedy Performance	Sex Education	Won	
British Academy Television Awards	2022	Best Female Comedy Performance	Sex Education	Nominated	
British Academy Television Awards	2026	Best Actress	Film Club	Nominated	
British Academy Television Awards	2026	Best Supporting Actress	The White Lotus	Nominated	
British Independent Film Awards	2022	Best Supporting Performance	Living	Nominated	
Golden Globe Awards	2026	Best Supporting Actress on Television	The White Lotus	Nominated	
Ian Charleson Awards	2020	—N/a	Uncle Vanya	Second	
National Comedy Awards	2022	Outstanding Supporting Role	Sex Education	Nominated	
Primetime Emmy Awards	2025	Outstanding Supporting Actress in a Drama Series	The White Lotus	Nominated	
Royal Television Society Programme Awards	2025	Comedy Performance - Female	Daddy Issues	Nominated	
The Stage Awards	2020	Best Actress in a Play	Uncle Vanya	Nominated	
WhatsOnStage Awards	2024	Best Takeover Performance	Cabaret	Won	
