= Informer (TV series) =

BBC television drama series

- Genre: Crime; Drama
- Created by: Rory Haines Sohrab Noshirvani
- Written by: Rory Haines; Sohrab Noshirvani
- Directed by: Jonny Campbell
- Starring: Paddy Considine; Bel Powley; Nabhaan Rizwan; Arsher Ali; Sharon D. Clarke; Nell Hudson; Roger Nsengiyumva; Sunetra Sarker; Stanley Townsend; Rachel Tucker; Jessica Raine
- Composer: Ilan Eshkeri
- Country of origin: United Kingdom
- Original language: English
- No. of series: 1
- No. of episodes: 6

Production
- Executive producers: Nicolas Brown; Elizabeth Kilgarriff; Sam Mendes; Julie Pastor
- Producer: Julian Stevens
- Production location: London
- Cinematography: Tony Slater Ling
- Editors: Fiona Colbeck; Gareth C. Scales
- Running time: 58–59 minutes
- Production company: Neal Street Productions

Original release
- Network: BBC One
- Release: 16 October – 20 November 2018

Informer is a British television drama series, created and written by Rory Haines and Sohrab Noshirvani and produced by Neal Street Productions for the BBC. The six-part series stars Paddy Considine, Bel Powley, Nabhaan Rizwan, and Jessica Raine. The series began broadcasting on BBC One on 16 October 2018.

Amazon Prime Video agreed to a distribution deal to broadcast the show outside the United Kingdom and Ireland.

In Belgium, Canvas started broadcasting the series on 27 April 2019.

== Synopsis ==
Raza (Nabhaan Rizwan) is a young second-generation British Pakistani man from London who is coerced into informing by Gabe (Paddy Considine), an officer in the (fictional) Counter-Terrorism Special Unit (CTSU). His newfound role in national security leads him into a variety of dangerous situations and alliances, and he struggles to balance his civilian lifestyle as the person that his family knows, with the secrecy and dangers of being a police informer.

== Cast ==
- Paddy Considine as DS Gabe Waters, a counterterrorism officer for the fictional Counter-Terrorism Special Unit. Haunted by his past undercover work for the Met's Special Branch, infiltrating a far-right movement in West Yorkshire, he struggles to balance his workload with time for his wife and daughter.
- Bel Powley as DC Holly Morten, a young officer recently selected to join the Counter-Terrorism Special Unit and assigned as Gabe's partner, though her inquisitive nature threatens his police work on many occasions.
- Nabhaan Rizwan as Raza Shar, a British Pakistani who is coerced by Gabe into working as an informer to uncover information about a possible cell connected with a terrorist attack in the Netherlands.
- Jessica Raine as Emily Waters, wife of Gabe. While she is initially loyal to him and she never questions his police work, her burning questions about his past work have what it takes to make Gabe's two world collide and unravel her life and family.
- Arsher Ali as Imran Aziz, an undercover police detective
- Sharon D. Clarke as DCI Rose Asante
- Nell Hudson as Charlotte Humphreys
- Roger Nsengiyumva as Dadir Hassan, a third-generation British Somali befriended by Raza working as a drug dealer in East London. His suspected terrorist connections are of interest to Raza's informing work.
- Sunetra Sarker as Sadia Shar, a Pakistani national who poses as the mother of Raza and Nasir. Having overstayed her student visa by at least 16 years to raise the two following their mother's death, Sadia's threatened deportation is used against Raza to coerce him into becoming an informer.
- Stanley Townsend as Geoffrey Boyce, DCI Rose Asante's counterpart
- Paul Tylak as Hanif Shar, father of Raza and Nasir. His humorous personality and alcoholic tendencies mask the pain of his wife's death.
- Reiss Jeram as Nasir Shar, younger brother of Raza. Unpopular at school and with few friends, an absent older brother, and an alcoholic father, he soon becomes easily influenced by Akash.
- Rachel Tucker as Sharon Collins, a Yorkshire woman caught up in the shady world of undercover policing
- Fehinti Balogun as Officer Cooper
- Arinzé Kene as Sal Brahimi, a former professional boxer known as "Big Shot", who owns a boxing gym frequented by Raza and Dadir, and is later discovered to be a recruiter for the London terror cell.
- Elizabeth Rider as Lady Justice Spencer
- Robert Whitelock as Officer Worrall
- Emily Taafe as Megan Morten
- Olivia Popica as Roxy Novac

== Episodes ==
No.	Title	Directed by	Written by	Original release date
1	"No Sleep Till Brooklyn"	Jonny Campbell	Rory Haines & Sohrab Noshirvani	16 October 2018
2	"Strawberry Fields"	Jonny Campbell	Rory Haines & Sohrab Noshirvani	23 October 2018
3	"Charlie Don't Surf"	Jonny Campbell	Rory Haines & Sohrab Noshirvani	30 October 2018
4	"Ruby Tuesday"	Jonny Campbell	Rory Haines & Sohrab Noshirvani	6 November 2018
5	"November Has Come"	Jonny Campbell	Rory Haines & Sohrab Noshirvani	13 November 2018
6	"The Masterplan"	Jonny Campbell	Rory Haines & Sohrab Noshirvani	20 November 2018

== Production ==
The series was largely filmed on location in London. Raza's home and the fictional nearby "Bridge Town Estate" were primarily filmed at the Thamesmead estate in south-east London as well as the Silverlock Estate in Southwark.

Filming took place at Shadwell railway station in January 2018 and in Brick Lane. The Silver Building, a former Carlsberg-Tetley factory at the Docklands Depot in Silvertown, was used as a set for the Counter-Terrorism Special Unit headquarters. The Printworks nightclub in Rotherhithe can be seen in the trailer alongside Delights Hair & Beauty salon on Rye Lane, Peckham. Other locations include Old Crown Courts in Kingston, Bethnal Green Working Men's Club, a restaurant at Fiveways on Sidcup Road in New Eltham and the Thames Clippers ferry.
