= Film Club (TV series) =

British television series

- Genre: Comedy drama
- Created by: Ralph Davis; Aimee Lou Wood
- Written by: Ralph Davis; Aimee Lou Wood; Anna Jordan
- Directed by: Catherine Morshead
- Starring: Aimee Lou Wood; Nabhaan Rizwan; Adam Long; Liv Hill; Suranne Jones
- Composer: Nathan Klein
- Country of origin: United Kingdom
- Original language: English
- No. of series: 1
- No. of episodes: 6

Production
- Executive producers: Alison Jackson; Jamie Jackson; Nawfal Faizullah; Aimee Lou Wood
- Producer: Byron Archard
- Cinematography: Jonas Mortensen
- Editor: Keelan Gumbley
- Running time: 30 min
- Production companies: BBC Studios; Gaumont UK

Original release
- Network: BBC Three
- Release: 7 October – 21 October 2025

Film Club is a British comedy drama television series created by Aimee Lou Wood and Ralph Davis. It stars Wood and Nabhaan Rizwan. It premiered on 7 October 2025 on BBC Three. In May 2026, the show was cancelled after one season.

== Synopsis ==
Cinema enthusiasts Evie and Noa come together with friends to celebrate and dissect iconic films. Their weekly film club has brought them together for many years, but Evie has become unable to leave home due to agoraphobia and challenges with her mental health. When Noa is offered a job that requires him to move away, he and Evie are forced to face the truth about their friendship.

== Cast and characters ==
=== Main ===
- Aimee Lou Wood as Evie
- Nabhaan Rizwan as Noa
- Adam Long as Josh
- Liv Hill as Izzie
- Suranne Jones as Suz

=== Supporting ===
- Lisa McGrillis as Steph
- Arian Nik as Kamran
- Fola Evans-Akingbola as Samantha
- Ralph Davis as Dominic
- Owen Cooper as Callum

== Production ==
The series was commissioned in February 2024 by BBC Three. It is produced by Gaumont UK. Aimee Lou Wood is co-writer alongside Ralph Davis. Executive producers also include Alison Jackson and Jamie Jackson for Gaumont, and Nawfal Faizullah for the BBC.

The cast includes Wood and Davis as well as Suranne Jones, Nabhaan Rizwan, Adam Long, and Liv Hill. Filming started in Manchester in late 2024.

On May 11, 2026, the BBC cancelled the show after one series.

== Broadcast ==
The series premiered on 7 October 2025 on BBC Three.

== Episodes ==
No.	Title	Directed by	Written by	Original release date
1	1	Catherine Morshead	Ralph Davis and Aimee Lou Wood	7 October 2025
2	2	Catherine Morshead	Ralph Davis and Aimee Lou Wood	7 October 2025
3	3	Catherine Morshead	Ralph Davis and Aimee Lou Wood	14 October 2025
4	4	Catherine Morshead	Anna Jordan	14 October 2025
5	5	Catherine Morshead	Ralph Davis and Aimee Lou Wood	21 October 2025
6	6	Catherine Morshead	Ralph Davis and Aimee Lou Wood	21 October 2025

== Reception ==
Lucy Mangan of The Guardian awarded the series four stars out of five, calling it a "sweet, smart romcom". Rachel Aroesti, also writing in The Guardian, described it as a "sweet tale of longing, anxiety and family bickering ... [which] retreats into sentimentality".

For her role, Aimee Lou Wood received a nomination for Leading Actress at the British Academy Television Awards.
