= Changing Ends =

British television sitcom

- Promotional poster for the first series
- Created by: Alan Carr
- Written by: Alan Carr; Simon Carlyle; Gabby Best
- Directed by: Dave Lambert
- Starring: Oliver Savell; Alan Carr; Shaun Dooley; Nancy Sullivan; Taylor Fay
- Theme music composer: Richard Day
- Country of origin: United Kingdom
- Original language: English
- No. of series: 3
- No. of episodes: 18

Production
- Executive producers: Alan Carr; Simon Carlyle; Sarah Monteith; Rupert Majendie; Danny Julian
- Producer: Mollie Freedman Berthoud
- Editor: Thomas Perrett
- Production company: Baby Cow Productions

Original release
- Network: ITVX
- Release: 1 June 2023 – present

Changing Ends is a British television sitcom released on ITVX in the UK from 1 June 2023. It is a semi-autobiographical series about comedian Alan Carr growing up in Northampton during the 1980s, the son of a professional football manager. A second series was released in July 2024 and with a third and fourth series commissioned in November 2024, the third series began airing in November 2025.

== Synopsis ==
Graham Carr was a former top-flight professional footballer who was the manager of Northampton Town F.C. when they won the Football League Fourth Division title in 1986–87. The East Midlands in Thatcher's Britain however may have felt very different as seen through the eyes of his son, "when your family are Match of the Day and you’re a bit Miss Marple".

== Cast ==
=== Main ===
- Oliver Savell as Young Alan Carr
  - Alan Carr as Older Alan Carr
- Shaun Dooley as Graham Carr, Alan's father and the manager of Northampton Town F.C.
- Nancy Sullivan as Christine Carr, Alan's mother
- Taylor Fay as Gary Carr, Alan's brother
- Rourke Mooney as Charlie Hudson, Alan's neighbour and friend
- Gabby Best as Angela Hudson, Charlie's mother
- Harry Peacock as Nigel Hudson, Charlie's father

=== Recurring ===
- Colin Salmon as Ron, the chairman of Northampton Town F.C.
- Joseph Dobbin as Paddy, the coach of Northampton Town F.C.
- Jack Medlin as Alfie, the captain of Northampton Town F.C.
- Charlie Jobe as Banjo, a Northampton Town F.C. footballer
- Nitin Ganatra as Mr Robertson, the headmaster of Alan's school
- David Mumeni as Mr Chapman, a PE teacher at Alan's school
- Victoria Alcock as Val, a dinner lady at Alan's school
- Cariad Lloyd as Jackie Gideon, a drama teacher at Alan's school
- Dotty Davies as Kay, Alan's classmate and friend
- Keira Chansa as Maz, Alan's classmate and Charlie's girlfriend
- Logan Matthews as Leslie Gorman, Alan's classmate and bully
- Matthew Stagg as Mandy Taylor, Alan's classmate and bully

=== Guest ===
- Michael Socha as Adam, a striker struggling with alcoholism
- Samantha Baines as Fiona
- Maggie Steed as Nanna Joyce, Alan's grandmother
- Kellie Shirley as Terri, Christine's sister and Alan's aunt

== Production ==
In February 2021 Carr and Baby Cow Productions began auditioning young actors to play himself in a sitcom that they were developing together. A non-broadcast pilot was made with BBC Studios in February 2022.

A six-part series was commissioned by ITVX in November 2022, with Carr co-writing with Simon Carlyle and production by Baby Cow. Executive producers were Sarah Monteith, Rupert Majendie and Danny Julian, alongside Carr and Carlyle. It was announced that Oliver Savell would play the young Carr.

In January 2023, it was confirmed that Shaun Dooley and Nancy Sullivan would be joining the cast as Alan's parents Christine and Graham Carr, with Taylor Fay playing his younger brother Gary. The family's neighbours, Charlie and Angela, would be played by Rourke Mooney and Gabby Best, with Harry Peacock as Nigel, David Mumeni as Mr Chapman and Michael Socha as Adam. Filming started that same month in Poplar Avenue in Orpington (Alan’s home) and other outdoor scenes were not filmed in Northampton itself.

A second series of six half-hour episodes was commissioned by ITV in November 2023, with filming scheduled for early 2024. In November 2024, a third series and a fourth series were commissioned by ITV.

== Episode list ==
=== Series 1 (2023) ===
No. overall	No. in series	Title	Directed by	Written by	Original release date
1	1	"Kick Off"	Dave Lambert	Alan Carr & Simon Carlyle	1 June 2023
Between a Dad managing a 4th Division football club and friends ditching him for being camp, Alan wants to change. Should he go against his instincts and become a footballer?
2	2	"Big League Player"	Dave Lambert	Alan Carr & Simon Carlyle	1 June 2023
Christine is desperate for Graham to take her on a night out. At school Alan is struggling to hide who his dad is from bullies – and there's the dread of communal showers looming.
3	3	"Man On"	Dave Lambert	Alan Carr & Simon Carlyle	1 June 2023
Graham's woes extend off the pitch and Alan gets the acting bug, but Christine is worried when he comes home from school with a black eye.
4	4	"Stud"	Dave Lambert	Alan Carr & Simon Carlyle	1 June 2023
A brilliant but troubled striker gives the Cobblers a lifeline, while keen birdwatcher Alan becomes eagle-eyed at news of a loose pelican. Then Sue's book club gets out of hand.
5	5	"Sick As A Parot"	Dave Lambert	Alan Carr & Simon Carlyle	1 June 2023
It's BCG day at Alan's school and he decides to pull a sickie. With Christine otherwise indisposed, it is up to a begrudging Graham to play nursemaid.
6	6	"Fowl Play"	Dave Lambert	Alan Carr & Simon Carlyle	1 June 2023
Things are looking up for the Carrs – the Cobblers are in the quarter finals of the Milk Cup, Alan's got a part in the school play, and Angela's marriage has taken a nose dive.

=== Series 2 (2024) ===
No. overall	No. in series	Title	Directed by	Written by	Original release date
7	1	"Baby Face"	Dave Lambert	Alan Carr & Gabby Best	13 July 2024
It's 1987 and Northampton Town are leading Division 4, but the bullies are still making Alan's life a misery, while peer pressure forces him to accept a challenge, leading him into the murky world of fake IDs.
8	2	"The Party & the Pervert"	Dave Lambert	Alan Carr & Gabby Best	13 July 2024
Knickers are being snatched and windows are being peeped in – it seems the Close has a pervert. Alan eagerly decides to play detective, even if it clashes with his 12th birthday.
9	3	"Mad Dogs & English Nans"	Dave Lambert	Alan Carr & Gabby Best	13 July 2024
A vicious Alsatian on the loose forces the Carrs and Nanna Joyce to have some unexpected quality time together, while Alan's little white lie turns the place into a pressure cooker.
10	4	"Kissing Presumed Dead"	Dave Lambert	Alan Carr & Gabby Best	13 July 2024
A sex education lesson strikes fear into Alan's heart while an impending testosterone-fuelled school disco gets him all hot and bothered – and not in a good way.
11	5	"Better the Neville You Know"	Dave Lambert	Alan Carr & Gabby Best	13 July 2024
With the stress of the Cobblers trying to stay top of the league taking its toll, Christine strong-arms Graham into having a caravan mini-break in Great Yarmouth.
12	6	"He Thinks It's All Over..."	Dave Lambert	Alan Carr & Gabby Best	13 July 2024
It's the day of reckoning – Northampton Town are all abuzz and anticipation of a promotion to the Third Division is in the air, but Alan is completely miserable.

=== Series 3 (2025) ===
No. overall	No. in series	Title	Directed by	Written by	Original release date
13	1	"Sink or Swim"	Dave Lambert	Alan Carr & Gabby Best	23 November 2025
It is 1989 and Alan has been bitten by the love bug, but while literally trying to keep his head above water he has a chance encounter that leaves him with a decision to make.
14	2	"London's Calling"	Dave Lambert	Alan Carr & Gabby Best	23 November 2025
London is calling for the Carrs - that can only mean one thing, quality time with Auntie Terri, but Alan feels obliged to serve up some home truths.
15	3	"Friction on the Close"	Dave Lambert	Alan Carr & Gabby Best	23 November 2025
Alan gets a shock regarding his future, and Christine gives an ill-judged interview in the local paper that causes friction on the close.
16	4	"The Heatwave"	Dave Lambert	Alan Carr & Gabby Best	23 November 2025
A heatwave looms as Alan tries to write about the man of his dreams, something that proves rather tricky given that they're in the same class at school.
17	5	"Father & Son Bonding"	Dave Lambert	Alan Carr & Gabby Best	23 November 2025
An away game feels like the perfect opportunity for a father and son bonding session, and a Tupperware party hosted by Christine takes a raucous turn.
18	6	"Unexpected Attention"	Dave Lambert	Alan Carr & Gabby Best	23 November 2025
ITV's Telethon has gripped the nation, but only some are willing to give while others are on the take - meanwhile, Alan gets some unexpected attention.

== Broadcast ==
The series was premiered on ITVX before broadcast on ITV at a later date. Changing Ends was made available for viewing on ITVX from 1 June.

== Reception ==
The series was ITVX’s ‘most viewed’ comedy of 2023.

In February 2024, the series was nominated at the Broadcast Awards in the Best Comedy Programme category. The series was also nominated for the 2025 Broadcast Awards in the Best Comedy Programme category. In March 2025, Savell was nominated at the 2025 British Academy Television Awards for Male Performance in a Comedy. He won for Best Comedy Performance at the Royal Television Society Programme Awards in March 2025. The series was nominated in the Comedy category at the 31st National Television Awards.
