= Juice (TV series) =

British comedy television series

- Genre: Comedy drama; Surreal comedy
- Created by: Mawaan Rizwan
- Based on: Juice by Mawaan Rizwan (2018 Edinburgh Fringe show)
- Starring: Mawaan Rizwan; Russell Tovey; Nabhaan Rizwan; Shahnaz Rizwan; Jeff Mirza
- Opening theme: Funnel of Love
- Ending theme: Shik Ma Van
- Country of origin: United Kingdom
- Original language: English
- No. of seasons: 2
- No. of episodes: 12

Production
- Executive producers: Hannah Moulder; Mawaan Rizwan; Phil Clarke; Tanya Qureshi; Ali Bryer Carron; Navi Lamba
- Producer: Maisah Thompson
- Production company: Various Artists Limited

Original release
- Network: BBC Three
- Release: 18 September 2023 – 18 September 2025

Juice is a British surreal comedy television series created by and starring Mawaan Rizwan for BBC Three. The series is based on Rizwan's 2018 Edinburgh Fringe show and premiered on 18 September 2023. It follows Rizwan's character, Jamma, as he navigates work life and relationships with his family and boyfriend.

== Premise ==
Juice follows Jamma, a young gay man who is navigating commitment issues in his relationship with his boyfriend, Guy, and attention issues in his relationship with his family. Guy contrasts with Jamma's high octane personality; he is a calmer, older man with an established career as a therapist and a desire for his relationship with Jamma to become more concrete. Jamma's mother, Farida, is a former movie star who now manages the Megacentre, a community centre for underprivileged people of all ages. Both Farida and Jamma's younger brother, Isaac, often upstage and outshine him, much to Jamma's dismay.

== Cast and characters ==
=== Main ===
- Mawaan Rizwan as Jamal "Jamma" Jamshidi, a young gay man who works at a marketing company and vies for attention amongst his family
- Russell Tovey as Guy, Jamal's older, therapist boyfriend
- Nabhaan Rizwan as Isaac, Jamma's younger brother
- Shahnaz Rizwan as Farida, Jamma's mother and head of the Megacentre
- Jeff Mirza as Saif, Jamma's father and finance manager for the Megacentre

=== Recurring ===
- Emily Lloyd-Saini as Winnie
- Hugh Coles as Pat
- Nathalie Armin as The Boss
- Raheem Payne as Raheem the Everything

== Episodes ==
| Series | Episodes | Originally released |
|---|---|---|
| 1 | 6 | 18 September 2023 |
| 2 | 6 | 18 September 2025 |

=== Season 1 (2023) ===
| No. overall | No. in season | Title | Directed by | Written by | Original release date |
|---|---|---|---|---|---|
| 1 | 1 | "Cake" | Rosco 5 | Mawaan Rizwan | 18 September 2023 |
Jamma has procrastinated unpacking his boxes in his boyfriend's Guy's apartment. Jamma is surprised when Guy says "I love you" and shifts his attention to his work in his marketing company. He sneakily uses his brother Isaac as a test subject, but is shocked when Isaac gets promoted over him. Meanwhile, Jamma convinces his mother Farida to not divorce Saif. At a party, Jamma takes ecstasy and says "I love you" back to Guy. Guy asks to meet Jamma's parents.
| 2 | 2 | "Helluva View" | Rosco 5 | Mawaan Rizwan | 18 September 2023 |
Jamma believes that everyone is flirting with him now that he is committed to Guy. His friend Winnie invites him to a flatshare, where he is tempted to cheat with a housemate. Farida kicks Saif out of her house when he uses her money to buy a karaoke machine instead of a new suit. Jamma settles the conflict, but Farida tells him that "love is not enough" to reconnect with Saif. Isaac tells Jamma that he is ditching him to work with another employee for the company's new facial cream. Jamma confesses his guilt to Guy, who understands and restates their trust for each other.
| 3 | 3 | "The Jamma Show" | Rosco 5 | Mawaan Rizwan | 18 September 2023 |
Farida declines a dinner invitation from Jamma to meet Guy. Jamma is too afraid to tell Guy that she cancelled, but she shows up anyway. Expecting homophobic comments, Jamma accuses her of ulterior motives when she acts uncharacteristically nice to Guy. However, Farida says that she does not find Jamma's relationship shocking, because she herself was once in love with a woman. Jamma accuses her of lying and making the moment all about herself. Later, Guy rebukes Jamma and says that Jamma made the moment all about him. Saif runs away.
| 4 | 4 | "A Saif Space" | Rosco 5 | Mawaan Rizwan and Emily Lloyd-Saini | 18 September 2023 |
Jamma struggles to balance work, family, friends and Guy. He's bitten off more than he can chew, and he finds himself preoccupied by something lurking beneath the floorboards.
| 5 | 5 | "Lights, Camera, Escape" | Rosco 5 | Mawaan Rizwan | 18 September 2023 |
Jamma and his colleagues embark on an escape room adventure to foster team bonding after a disastrous pitch. Jamma tries to keep Winnie and Guy from talking to each other in hopes of covering up his lie, but instead finds himself entering a gateway into the past.
| 6 | 6 | "Home" | Rosco 5 | Mawaan Rizwan | 18 September 2023 |
Jamma finally unpacks his boxes in Guy's flat. The council comes to evict Farida's business. Despite giving an impassioned speech of how the Megacentre is the only home he's known, Jamma's family is still evicted. Meanwhile, Saif admits to Guy in a therapy session that he feels overshadowed by his wife. Jamma and Guy realise they are too different from each other and they break up. Later, Jamma finds Guy and Saif singing "Freedom" on the karaoke machine and joins in.

=== Season 2 (2025) ===
| No. overall | No. in season | Title | Directed by | Written by | Original release date |
|---|---|---|---|---|---|
| 7 | 1 | "Sup" | Eros V | Mawaan Rizwan | 18 September 2025 |
| 8 | 2 | "House Sh*tting" | Eros V | Mawaan Rizwan | 18 September 2025 |
| 9 | 3 | "Emporium's New Clothes" | Eros V | Mawaan and Nabhaan Rizwan | 18 September 2025 |
| 10 | 4 | "The Bullfighter and the Egg" | Eros V | Mawaan Rizwan and Emily Lloyd-Saini | 18 September 2025 |
| 11 | 5 | "The Storm Is Coming" | Eros V | Mawaan Rizwan | 18 September 2025 |
| 12 | 6 | "Last Chapter" | Eros V | Mawaan Rizwan | 18 September 2025 |

== Production ==
Juice is based partially upon Rizwan's real life, though Rizwan has stated the show is "definitely fictional", and features his real-life mother and brother as his family in the show. Juice's notable features include its practical effects and "distinctive trippy visuals", as well as how it "explore[s] adult themes in a childlike way".

The title of the show was inspired by Rizwan's mother, who used to say "If life gives you mangoes, make mango juice."

Rizwan has cited Boots Riley, Bong Joon-Ho, and Buster Keaton as sources of influence. Having attended École Philippe Gaulier, Rizwan sought to incorporate elements of clowning into the show.

Juice was commissioned in 2022 following a successful pilot created the previous autumn.

The BBC confirmed in May 2024 that Juice would return for a second series. In April 2025, it was announced that the second series had begun filming and was released in September 2025.

== Release ==
The first series was released for streaming on BBC iPlayer on 18 September 2023, and BBC Three aired two episodes of the show a week on Mondays. The second series was released on 18 September 2025.

== Reception ==
=== Critical response ===
Juice was well received, garnering 3- and 4-star reviews from The Daily Telegraph, The Guardian, and Chortle. It has received praise for its "eye-popping visual style" and exploration of family relationships. Other sources of acclaim include Juice's childlike playfulness and "slapstick comedy". However, Juice has faced criticism for its lack of cohesion between scenes and how it "never quite reach[es] laugh-out-loud funny".

=== Awards and nominations ===
Awards and nominations received by Juice
| Year | Award | Category | Recipients | Result | Ref |
|---|---|---|---|---|---|
| 2023 | I Talk Telly Awards | Best New Comedy | —N/a | Nominated | |
| 2024 | Broadcast Awards | Best Comedy Programme | —N/a | Highly Commended | |
| 2024 | Broadcasting Press Guild Awards | BPG Emerging Creators Award | Mawaan Rizwan | Nominated | |
| 2024 | Broadcast Awards | Best Comedy Programme | —N/a | Highly Commended | |
| 2024 | RTS Awards | Comedy Drama | —N/a | Won | |
| 2024 | BAFTA Television Craft Awards | Writer: Comedy | Mawaan Rizwan | Nominated | |
| 2024 | BAFTA Television Craft Awards | Emerging Talent: Fiction | Mawaan Rizwan | Nominated | |
