= British Academy Television Craft Award for Best Entertainment Craft Team =

Award for technical achievements in TV

British Academy Television Craft Award
- Country: United Kingdom
- Presented by: British Academy of Film and Television Arts
- First award: 2010
- Currently held by: Ben Archard, Siggi Rosen-Rawlings, James Tinsley, Stuart Frossell, Martin Adams, Nathan Lindley for The Celebrity Traitors (2026)
- Website: http://www.bafta.org/

The British Academy Television Craft Award for Best Entertainment Craft Team is one of the categories presented by the British Academy of Film and Television Arts (BAFTA) within the British Academy Television Craft Awards, the craft awards were established in 2000 with their own, separate ceremony as a way to spotlight technical achievements, without being overshadowed by the main production categories.

It was first awarded in 2010 as Best Entertainment Production Team but since 2011 it has been awarded under its current name, according to the BAFTA website, the category is "awarded to a creative team working in entertainment programming.", this includes "general entertainment programmes, variety shows, game shows, standup comedies, quizzes, panel games and celebrity chat shows."

== Winners and nominees ==
=== 2010s ===
Best Entertainment Production Team

Year	Title	Recipient(s)	Broadcaster
2010	The X Factor		ITV
2010	The Apprentice		BBC One
2010	Britain's Got Talent		ITV
2010	Top Gear		BBC Two

Best Entertainment Craft Team

Year	Title	Recipient(s)	Broadcaster
2011	The Cube	Barry Osment, Nick Foster, Peter Johnston, Julian Healy	ITV
2011	Strictly Come Dancing	Su Judd, Patrick Doherty, Mark Kenyon, Lisa Armstrong	BBC One
2011	The Apprentice	Mark Saben, Andy Devonshire, Stephen Day, James Clarke	BBC One
2011	The X Factor	Robert Edwards, Dave Davey, Simon Tyers, Florian Wieder	ITV
2012	The Cube	Paul Bussey, Nick Collier, Luke Halls, Annabel Raftery	ITV
2012	Derren Brown The Experiments: The Secret of Luck	Simon Ainge, Nick Foster, Zebedee Helm, Rachel Jury	Channel 4
2012	Top Gear	Konrad Begg, Phil Churchward, Ben Joiner, Iain May	BBC Two
2012	The X Factor	Dave Davey, Robert Edwards, Matt Jeffreys, Julien Rigal	ITV
2013	Derren Brown: Apocalypse	Stephen Bryce, Andrew Cooke, Simon Ainge, Nick Foster	Channel 4
2013	The X Factor Final	Dave Davey, Robert Edwards, Florian Wieder, Falk Rosenthal	ITV
2013	The Diamond Jubilee Concert	Durham Marenghi, Steve Nolan, Sam Pattinson, Tim Routledge	BBC One
2013	Top Gear	Dan James, James Hart, Richard Porter, Kate Jones-Mackay	BBC Two
2014	Ant & Dec's Saturday Night Takeaway	Patrick Doherty, Kevin Duff, Kim Gavin, Andrew Milligan	ITV
2014	Doctor Who at the Proms 2013	Bernie Davis, Eryl Ellis, Huw Thomas, Keith Ware	BBC One
2014	Dynamo: Magician Impossible	Alex Hartman, Saul Gittens, Dan Evans, Amer Iqbal	Watch
2014	Top Gear	James Hart, Dan James, Andy Hodges	BBC Two
2015	The X Factor	Dave Davey, Robert Edwards, Falk Rosenthal	ITV
2015	The Apprentice	Tom Thurston-Mathews, James Clarke, Robin Trump, Mark Owen	BBC One
2015	The Voice	Jonnie Blackburn, Kevin Duff, Gurdip Mahal, David Tench	BBC One
2015	Strictly Come Dancing	Lisa Armstrong, Patrick Doherty, Vicky Gill, Tony Revell	BBC One
2016	The Sound Of Music Live!	Zac Nicholson, Tomas Burton, Edward K. Gibbon, Jacquetta Levon	ITV
2016	A League of Their Own	Andrew Norgate, Aiden Spackman, Kevin Day, Kevin Duff	Sky One
2016	The Apprentice	James Clarke, Mark Owen, John Featherstone, Ian Hughes	BBC One
2016	Strictly Come Dancing	Jason Gilkison, Mark Kenyon, Tony Revell, Dave Newton	BBC One
2017	Royal British Legion Festival of Remembrance 2016	Bernie Davis, David Cole, Kevin Duff, Patrick Doherty	BBC One
2017	Ant & Dec's Saturday Night Takeaway	Karen Bruce, Patrick Doherty, Mark Kenyon, Mark Busk-Cowley	ITV
2017	The Queen's 90th Birthday Celebration	Kevin Duff, Howard Nock, Tony Freeman, Nick Collier	ITV
2017	Strictly Come Dancing	David Newton, Mark Kenyon, Jason Gilkison, Vicky Gill	BBC One
2018	World War One Remembered: Passchendaele	Nigel Catmur, David Cole, Kate Dawkins, Kevin Duff	BBC Two
2018	The Voice UK	Dave Davey, David Tench, Dominic Tolfts, Kevin Duff	ITV
2018	Strictly Come Dancing	Jason Gilkison, Mark Kenyon, Patrick Doherty, David Newton	BBC One
2018	One Love Manchester	Richard Valentine, Toby Alington, Simon Sanders	BBC One
2019	The Royal British Legion Festival of Remembrance	Nigel Catmur, David Cole, Kate Dawkins, Kevin Duff	BBC One
2019	The Voice UK	Dave Davey, David Tench, Dominic Tolfts, Kevin Duff	ITV
2019	Strictly Come Dancing	Lisa Armstrong, Jason Gilkison, Mark Kenyon, Richard Sillitto	BBC One
2019	The Mash Report	Tim Telling, Tom Neenan, Steve Andrews, Ben Blease	BBC Two

=== 2020s ===
Year	Title	Recipient(s)	Broadcaster
2020	Strictly Come Dancing	David Bishop, Vicky Gill, Andy Tapley, Patrick Doherty	BBC One
2020	Love Island	Mark Busk-Cowley, Steve Kruger, Iain Stirling, James Tinsley	ITV
2020	Glastonbury 2019 (Stormzy)	Amber Rimell, Bronski, Misty Buckley, Tim Routledge	BBC One
2020	The Royal British Legion Festival of Remembrance	Nigel Catmur, Patrick Doherty, Kevin Duff, Andrew Stokes	BBC One
2021	I'm a Celebrity...Get Me Out of Here!	Mark Busk-Cowley, Roy Callow, Steve Kruger, Andy Milligan, James Tinsley, Mathieu Weekes	ITV
2021	Last Night of the Proms	David Bishop, Andy Payne, Lucy Foster	BBC One
2021	Strictly Come Dancing	David Bishop, Darren Lovell, David Newton, Richard Sillitto, Andy Tapley, Catherine Land	BBC One
2021	Ant & Dec's Saturday Night Takeaway	Andrew Milligan, Mark Busk-Cowley, Gurdip Mahal, Rob Ashard, Claudine Taylor	ITV
2022	The Royal British Legion Festival of Remembrance	Nigel Catmur, Andy Deacon, Patrick Doherty, Kevin Duff, Simon Haw, Andrew Stokes	BBC One
2022	Ant & Dec's Saturday Night Takeaway	Chris Power, Mark Busk-Cowley, Andy Milligan, Shereen Shimmin, Catherine Land, Gurdip Mahal	ITV
2022	The Masked Singer	Dave Davey, Elizabeth Honan, Benn Wyldeck, Casey Antwis	ITV
2022	Strictly Come Dancing	David Bishop, Patrick Doherty, David Newton, Catherine Land, Richard Sillitto, Tom Young	BBC One
2023	Strictly Come Dancing	Catherine Land, David Bishop, Patrick Doherty, Richard Silitto, David Newton, Joe Phillips	BBC One
2023	Concert for Ukraine	Jen Bollom, Gareth Iles, Tim Routledge, Steve Sidwell, Richard Valentine, Chris Vaughan	ITV
2023	Platinum Jubilee: Party at the Palace	Tom Bairstow, Nigel Catmur, Andy Deacon, Kevin Duff, Simon Haw, Steve Sidwell	BBC One
2023	Taskmaster	Andy Devonshire, James Dillon, Dru Masters, Rebecca Bowker	Channel 4
2024	Eurovision Song Contest 2023	Julio Himede, Tim Routledge, Kojo Samuel, Michael Sharp, Dan Shipton	BBC One
2024	Banged Up	Jamie Heath, Nick Harvey, Greg Menzel	Channel 4
2024	Squid Game: The Challenge	Diccon Ramsay, Paddy Fletcher, Rikki Finlay, James Tinsley, Mathieu Weekes, Ben Norman	Netflix
2024	The Coronation Concert	Nigel Catmur, Tom Bairstow, Kevin Duff, Steve Nolan, Steve Sidwell, Simon Haw	BBC One
2025	Taskmaster	Andy Devonshire, Rebecca Bowker, James Dillon, Dru Masters	Channel 4
2025	The Traitors	Ben Archard, James Tinsley, Siggi-Rosen-Rawlings, Mathieu Weekes, Martin Adams, Jimmy Barnett	BBC One
2025	Strictly Come Dancing	David Bishop, Joe Phillips, Catherine Land, Jen Townsend, David Arch, Ian Masterson	BBC One
2025	Miracles	Jon Richards, Robert Pound, Tom Elderfield, Darren Sarsby, Peter Turner, Adam Hutchings	Sky Max
2026	The Celebrity Traitors	Ben Archard, Siggi Rosen-Rawlings, James Tinsley, Stuart Frossell, Martin Adams, Nathan Lindley	BBC One
2026	ONE SHOT: With Ed Sheeran	Philip Barantini, Nyk Allen, Jacob Smith, Joe Blodgett, Frank Larson, Brendan Poutier	Netflix
2026	Rob & Romesh Vs	Graham Proud, Toby Wilkinson, Sam Turner, Alex Weeks, Jennifer Ford	Sky Max
2026	Squid Game: The Challenge	Diccon Ramsay, Rikki Finlay, Mat Weekes, Ben Norman, James Tinsley, Rob Mansfield	Netflix
