= British Academy Television Craft Award for Best Director: Multi-Camera =

Award for technical achievements in TV

British Academy Television Craft Award
- Country: United Kingdom
- Presented by: British Academy of Film and Television Arts
- First award: 2011
- Currently held by: Laurence Cawsey for Super Sunday - Liverpool v Tottenham Hotspur (2026)
- Website: http://www.bafta.org/

The British Academy Television Craft Award for Best Director: Multi-Camera is one of the categories presented by the British Academy of Film and Television Arts (BAFTA) within the British Academy Television Craft Awards, the craft awards were established in 2000 with their own, separate ceremony as a way to spotlight technical achievements, without being overshadowed by the main production categories.

In 2006 and 2007 there was only on category for directors but in 2008 the category was split in three separate categories to recognize directing for different programming, first creating Best Director: Factual and Best Director: Fiction and then in 2011, Best Director: Multi-Camera.

== Winners and nominees ==
=== 2000s ===
Best Director

Year	Recipient(s)	Title	Broadcaster
2006	Brian Percival	Much Ado About Nothing	BBC One
2006	Simon Cellan Jones	The Queen's Sister	Channel 4
2006	Joe Ahearne	Doctor Who	BBC One
2006	Justin Chadwick	Bleak House	BBC One
2007	Edmund Coulthard	Soundproof	BBC Two
2007	Tom Hooper	Longford	Channel 4
2007	Adrian Shergold	Low Winter Sun	Channel 4
2007	Bharat Nalluri	Life on Mars	BBC One

=== 2010s ===
Best Director: Multi-Camera

Year	Recipient(s)	Title	Broadcaster
2011	Tony Prescott	Coronation Street - Live Episode	ITV1
2011	Juliet May	Miranda	BBC Two
2011	Jonathan Bullen	The X Factor	ITV
2011	Nikki Parsons	Strictly Come Dancing	BBC One
2012	Phil Heyes	The X Factor Final	ITV
2012	Ben Kellett	Mrs Brown's Boys	BBC One
2012	Claire Popplewell	The Royal Wedding	BBC One
2012	Richard Valentine	Dancing on Ice	ITV
2013	Hamish Hamilton, Tapani Parm	The London 2012 Olympic Opening Ceremony: Isle of Wonder	BBC One
2013	Paul Davies	The London 2012 Olympics: Super Saturday	BBC One
2013	Nikki Parsons	Strictly Come Dancing	BBC One
2013	Hamish Hamilton, Tapani Parm	The London 2012 Olympic Closing Ceremony: Symphony of British Music	BBC One
2014	Phil Heyes	The X Factor	ITV
2014	Bridget Caldwell	The Funeral of Baroness Thatcher	BBC One
2014	Steve Smith	The Graham Norton Show	BBC One
2014	Nikki Parsons	Strictly Come Dancing	BBC One
2015	Paul McNamara	2014 FA Cup Final	ITV
2015	Chris Power	Ant and Dec's Saturday Night Takeaway	ITV
2015	Directing Team	D-Day 70: The Heroes Return	BBC One
2015	Ben Kellett	Mrs. Brown's Boys	BBC One
2016	Richard Valentine, Coky Giedroyc	The Sound Of Music Live!	ITV
2016	Chris Power	Ant and Dec's Saturday Night Takeaway	ITV
2016	John Anderson	Coronation Street	ITV
2016	John Watts	Rugby World Cup Final: New Zealand V Australia	ITV
2017	Chris Power	Ant & Dec's Saturday Night Takeaway	ITV
2017	Nikki Parsons	Strictly Come Dancing	BBC One
2017	Nikki Parsons	The Centenary of the Battle of the Somme	BBC One
2017	Pete Andrews	Wimbledon 2016	BBC One
2018	Julia Knowles	World War One Remembered: Passchendaele	BBC Two
2018	Chris Power	Ant and Dec's Saturday Night Takeaway	ITV
2018	James Morgan	Wild Alaska Live	BBC One
2018	Nikki Parsons	Strictly Come Dancing	BBC One
2019	Barbara Wiltshire	Inside No.9 Live: Dead Line	BBC Two
2019	Bridget Caldwell	The Royal British Legion Festival of Remembrance	BBC One
2019	Julia Knowles, Helen Scott, Simon Staffurth	The Royal Wedding: Prince Harry and Meghan Markle	BBC One
2019	Liz Clare	The Voice UK	ITV

=== 2020s ===
Year	Recipient(s)	Title	Broadcaster
2020	Janet Fraser Crook	Glastonbury 2019	BBC One
2020	Paul McNamara	ITV Racing: Cheltenham Festival	ITV
2020	Bridget Caldwell	The Royal British Legion Festival of Remembrance	BBC One
2020	Matthew Griffiths	Six Nations 2019 - Wales v England	BBC One
2021	Marcus Viner	ENO's Drive & Live: La Bohème	Sky Arts
2021	Bridget Caldwell	The Royal British Legion Festival of Remembrance	BBC One
2021	Ken Burton	Rugby League Challenge Cup Final	BBC One
2021	Nikki Parsons	Strictly Come Dancing	BBC One
2022	Paul Dugdale	Glastonbury Festival: Live at Worthy Farm	BBC Two
2022	Paul McNamara	ITV Racing: The Grand National	ITV Sport/ITV
2022	Matthew Griffiths	Six Nations Rugby: Wales v England	BBC Sport/BBC One
2022	Nikki Parsons	Strictly Come Dancing	BBC One
2023	Directing team	The State Funeral of HM Queen Elizabeth II	BBC One
2023	Janet Fraser	Glastonbury Festival 2022	BBC Two
2023	Julia Knowles	Platinum Jubilee: Party at the Palace	BBC One
2023	Nikki Parsons	Strictly Come Dancing	BBC One
2024	Nikki Parsons, Ollie Bartlett, Richard Valentine	Eurovision Song Contest 2023	BBC One
2024	Paul McNamara	FA Cup Final	ITV
2024	Julia Knowles	An Audience with Kylie	ITV
2024	Julia Knowles	The Coronation Concert	BBC One
2025	Janet Fraser Crook	Glastonbury 2024	BBC One
2025	Chris Cook	BBC General Election 2024	BBC One
2025	Directing Team	D-Day 80: Tribute to the Fallen	BBC One
2025	Nikki Parsons	Strictly Come Dancing	BBC One
2026	Laurence Cawsey	Super Sunday - Liverpool v Tottenham Hotspur	Sky Sports
2026	Ben Archard, Eddie Lewis, Marieke Barker-Benfield	The Celebrity Traitors	BBC One
2026	Ben Hardy	LOL: Last One Laughing UK	Prime Video
2026	Diccon Ramsay	VE Day 80: A Celebration to Remember	BBC One
