= Robin Sewell =

Robin Sewell (born 22 December 1979) is a professional ballroom dancer. He was born in Durban, South Africa.

He has danced competitively with: Beate Kaulitz (? – June 2001), Elisabeth Haraldsdottir (January 2002 – November 2003), Nuria Santalucia (December 2003 – June 2005), Nicole Cutler (June 2005 – June 2006), and Alarna Donovan (January 2007 – January 2008). He has no current professional dancing partner.

Robin Sewell with Elisabeth Haraldsdottir (Iceland) was the Amateur Latin Open Champion in 2002. His partnership with Nicole Cutler saw them become runners-up in the closed British Championships and ranked second in England.
