= Nicole Cutler =

British dancer

- Born: Nicole Westdyk; 8 June 1972 (age 53); Durban, South Africa
- Occupation: Dancer
- Spouse(s): Matthew Cutler (1996-2003); Jonathan Batty (2010-present)

Nicole Cutler (née Westdyk; born 8 June 1972) is a professional ballroom dancer and former World Amateur Latin-American champion. She was born Nicole Westdyk in Durban, South Africa and after taking up ballet at the age of four, first tried out ballroom and Latin-American dancing at the age of twelve.

== Career ==
In South Africa she danced competitively with Andrew Magin and Warren Smith before moving to the UK in 1990. In 1994 she teamed up with British dancer Matthew Cutler and they were married in 1996. They divorced in 2003, but have recently been dancing non-competitively once again, still using her married name. In 1999 they formed the principal couple in the stage show Burn the Floor. Jay Park was her professional partner from November 2003 to June 2004. They came first in the Professional Latin All England Championship in May 2004. Nicole partnered Robin Sewell from June 2005 to June 2006. They were runners-up in the closed British Championships and ranked second in England. She twice received the Carl Alan Award for "outstanding contributions to dance".

She has appeared as a professional dancer on Strictly Come Dancing. In series two, she partnered Diarmuid Gavin, then took a break from the show. However, she returned in series four to partner Nicholas Owen, and John Barnes in series five.

== Strictly Come Dancing performances ==
| Series | Partner | Place | Average |
|---|---|---|---|
| 2 | Diarmuid Gavin | 7th | 13.8 |
| 4 | Nicholas Owen | 14th | 14 |
| 5 | John Barnes | 7th | 27.1 |

=== Performances with Diarmuid Gavin ===
| Week | Dance & song | Judges' score | | | | Total | Result |
|---|---|---|---|---|---|---|---|
| Week | Dance & song | Horwood | Phillips | Goodman | Tonioli | Total | Result |
| 1 | Cha-cha-cha / "September" | 2 | 2 | 4 | 4 | 12 | Safe |
| 2 | Quickstep / "I'll Be There for You" | 2 | 3 | 4 | 4 | 12 | Safe |
| 3 | Tango / "Por Una Cabeza" | 2 | 3 | 5 | 4 | 14 | Safe |
| 4 | Paso doble / "L'amour est un oiseau rebelle" | 3 | 4 | 5 | 5 | 17 | Eliminated |

=== Performances with Nicholas Owen ===
| Week | Dance & song | Judges' score | | | | Total | Result |
|---|---|---|---|---|---|---|---|
| Week | Dance & song | Horwood | Phillips | Goodman | Tonioli | Total | Result |
| 1 | Waltz / "(You Make Me Feel Like) A Natural Woman" | 2 | 2 | 5 | 5 | 12 | Eliminated |

=== Performances with John Barnes ===
| Week | Dance & song | Judges' score | | | | Total | Result |
|---|---|---|---|---|---|---|---|
| Week | Dance & song | Horwood | Phillips | Goodman | Tonioli | Total | Result |
| 1 | Cha-cha-cha / "Uptight" | 6 | 6 | 7 | 7 | 26 | Safe |
| 3 (Note: In this series, couples eithed danced in Week 1 or 2 before all remaining couples danced every week from Week 3 onwards) | Jive / "Reet Petite" | 6 | 7 | 7 | 7 | 27 | Bottom two |
| 4 | American Smooth / "Stay with Me Baby" | 4 | 5 | 7 | 6 | 22 | Safe |
| 5 | Foxtrot / "My Guy" | 4 | 6 | 7 | 7 | 24 | Bottom two |
| 6 | Salsa / "Ran Kan Kan" | 8 | 9 | 10 | 9 | 36 | Safe |
| 7 | Tango / "Dance with Me" | 6 | 7 | 8 | 7 | 28 | Bottom two |
| 8 | Samba / "Sir Duke" | 7 | 6 | 7 | 7 | 27 | Eliminated |

== Titles ==
=== Professional ===
- All England Professional Champion 2004
- World, Open British, International and UK Professional Latin finalist, 2000–2003
- UK Closed Professional Latin Champion, 2000, 2002
- World Masters Professional Latin Champion, 2000

=== Amateur ===
- UK Open Amateur Champion 2000
- Open British Amateur Champions 1997, 1999
- World, European & International Amateur Champion 1999
- Closed British Amateur Champions 1995, 1996, 1997, 1999
- Closed UK Amateur Champions 1995, 1996, 1997, 1998, 1999
- Dutch Open Amateur Latin Champions 1998, 1999
- South African Open Amateur Champions 1990, 1994
