= Matthew Cutler =

English dancer (born 1973)

- Born: Matthew David Cutler; 30 October 1973 (age 52); Chelmsford, Essex, England
- Occupation: Dancer
- Spouse: Nicole Cutler (m. 1996–2003)

Matthew David Cutler (born 30 October 1973) is an English dancer and former World Amateur Latin-American champion. He was a professional dancer on the BBC dancing show Strictly Come Dancing.

== Early life ==
Cutler was born in Chelmsford, Essex. His brother designs all his clothes, personal and professional. When he was four, his family moved to Southend-on-Sea, Essex, where he went to Earls Hall Primary School and Cecil Jones Secondary School, now Cecil Jones Academy. He started dancing classes in a church hall in Southend and took part in school competitions and other competitions in Chelmsford.

By the age of ten, he was winning most competitions and a judge suggested that he entered more challenging competitions. Cutler took ballroom lessons in Birmingham and Latin classes in Hendon and took part in open competitions, supported by his parents.

He won the World Amateur Championship with his then wife Nicole Cutler in 1999, and went on to win many other competitions. They were later divorced in 2003, and went on to work with different professional partners, reuniting in 2006. In October 2009, the Cutlers started the Semley Club Dance Academy in Norbury, South London, United Kingdom, where they teach dance.

== Strictly Come Dancing ==
Series	Celebrity partner	Place	Average Score
3	Siobhan Hayes	12th	15.0
4	Carol Smillie	5th	29.4
5	Alesha Dixon	1st	36.5
6	Christine Bleakley	5th	28.4
7	Martina Hingis	16th	23.0

Cutler joined the third series of Strictly Come Dancing in 2005, when he and Siobhan Hayes left in week one. He partnered Carol Smillie in 2006, reaching week nine, and won the competition in 2007 with partner Alesha Dixon. In January/February 2008, Matthew competed with ex Olympian Denise Lewis on the Strictly Come Dancing Tour.

He partnered Christine Bleakley in the series of 2008, and finished fifth overall. In January/February 2009. Matthew danced with Kristina Rihanoff on the Strictly Come Dancing Tour. For the series of 2009 of Strictly, Matthew partnered Tennis ace Martina Hingis.

He and Martina were the first couple to leave the series of 2009. His professional partner for 2009 was Aliona Vilani. He did not return for the eighth series in Autumn 2010, but returned for the Christmas special, partnering Fern Britton.

== Awards ==
He has twice received the Carl Alan Award for an outstanding contribution to dance.

=== Professional ===
- Strictly Come Dancing champion (partnered with Alesha Dixon), 2007
- World, Open British, International and UK Professional Latin finalist, 2000–2005
- International Professional Latin finalist, 2004
- World and European Professional Latin finalist, 2005
- British Closed Professional Latin Champion, 2004
- UK Closed Professional Latin Champion, 2000, 2002, 2004, 2005
- World Masters Professional Latin Champion, 2000

=== Amateur ===
- UK Open Amateur Champion 2000
- Open British Amateur Champions 1997, 1999
- World, European & International Amateur Champion 1999
- Closed British Amateur Champions 1995, 1996, 1997, 1999
- Closed UK Amateur Champions 1995, 1996, 1997, 1998, 1999
- Dutch Open Amateur Latin Champions 1998, 1999
- South African Open Amateur Champions 1990, 1994

== Television appearances ==
- Come Dancing (1992–1995, 1998)
- International Come Dancing (1996)
- Burn The Floor (1999)
- Strictly Come Dancing (2005–2009)
- Diet on the Dancefloor (2008)
- Ready Steady Cook (2009)
