= Strictly Come Dancing =

British television series

- Title card as of 2026
- Genre: Dance talent show
- Created by: Fenia Vardanis; Richard Hopkins; Karen Smith
- Developed by: Karen Smith
- Presented by: Bruce Forsyth; Tess Daly; Claudia Winkleman; Emma Willis; Josh Widdicombe; Johannes Radebe
- Judges: Anton Du Beke; Craig Revel Horwood; Arlene Phillips; Len Goodman; Bruno Tonioli; Alesha Dixon; Darcey Bussell; Shirley Ballas; Motsi Mabuse
- Narrated by: Alan Dedicoat
- Theme music composer: Dan McGrath; Josh Phillips
- Composers: Dan McGrath, Josh Phillips
- Country of origin: United Kingdom
- Original language: English
- No. of series: 24
- No. of episodes: 490

Production
- Executive producers: Karen Smith (2004–2006); Sam Donnelly (2007–2009); Moira Ross (2010–2011); Glenn Coomber (2012); Andrea Hamilton (2012); Louise Rainbow (2013–2018); Sarah James (2019–present)
- Production locations: BBC Television Centre (2004–2012); Blackpool Tower (2004, 2009–2011, 2013–2019, 2022–present); Wembley Arena (2011–2012); Elstree Studios (2013–present)
- Camera setup: Multi-camera
- Running time: 15–150 minutes
- Production company: BBC Studios Entertainment Productions

Original release
- Network: BBC One
- Release: 15 May 2004 – present

Related
- Come Dancing; Strictly Come Dancing: It Takes Two; Strictly Dance Fever; Dancing with the Stars

Strictly Come Dancing (commonly referred to as Strictly) is a British dance competition show in which celebrities partner with professional dancers to compete in mainly ballroom and Latin dance. Each couple is scored by a panel of judges. The title of the show is an amalgamation of 1992 film Strictly Ballroom and long-running TV series Come Dancing. The format has been exported to 60 other countries under the title Dancing with the Stars, licensed by BBC Worldwide, and led to a modern dance-themed spin-off Strictly Dance Fever. The Guinness World Records named Strictly as the world's most successful reality television format in 2010.

The series was presented by Bruce Forsyth and Tess Daly from its inception; Claudia Winkleman joined Daly as a lead presenter from the 2014 series, having hosted results shows in place of Forsyth since 2010. Forsyth continued to host special episodes with Daly until November 2015. Daly and Winkleman left the series in 2025, with the presenting line-up for 2026 announced on 19 May 2026 as Emma Willis, Josh Widdicombe, and Johannes Radebe.

The series has been broadcast live on BBC One since 15 May 2004, airing on Saturday evenings. From series 2 onwards, the show has been broadcast in the run up to Christmas. Results shows were originally broadcast live on Saturdays, and are currently pre-recorded and aired on Sunday evenings. With its high viewing figures, Strictly Come Dancing has become a significant programme for dancing on British television. Eighteen stand-alone Christmas specials and nineteen charity specials have also been produced.

== Development ==
Producer Richard Hopkins, who had produced the first British series of Big Brother, unsuccessfully pitched the idea of a modern Come Dancing to the BBC under the title of Pro-Celebrity Dancing in 2003. Later, entertainment executive Fenia Vardanis also suggested reviving Come Dancing, so Jane Lush, the then head of BBC Entertainment, put Hopkins and Vardanis together to develop the show.

Hopkins then called in Karen Smith, who had previously produced Comic Relief Does Fame Academy for BBC One and The Games for Channel 4, to help lead the development of the show and launch the series. Smith was the show-running Executive Producer of the first three series, and of sister show It Takes Two. She then became Creative Director of BBC Entertainment whilst still overseeing series 4 and 5.

Hopkins later took the format to America himself when the BBC dismissed the idea of selling it abroad, as they felt it was too British, establishing the format internationally as Dancing with the Stars.

The title is an amalgamation of the titles of the 1992 Australian film Strictly Ballroom and Come Dancing.

== Format ==
The show is broadcast live on BBC One on Saturday evenings, with a results show originally following later on Saturday, also broadcast live. For series five, six and eight onwards, the results show is pre-recorded on Saturday and broadcast on Sunday evenings. The final results continued to be shown live on Saturdays, and were combined with the main show from series 14.

From series 1 to 11, Sir Bruce Forsyth and Tess Daly presented the pro-celebrity ballroom dancing competition. From series 8 to 11, Forsyth only presented the main show and was replaced for the results show by Claudia Winkleman, at which point Daly assumed Forsyth's role as main presenter and Winkleman assumed Daly's role as co-presenter. Winkleman joined Daly as full-time co-presenter for series 12 following Forsyth's departure after the 2013 series. Forsyth continued to present special editions of the show until 2015.

Through telephone voting, viewers vote for who they would like to be in the next round, the results of the poll being combined with the ranking of the judges. For example, with ten contestants left, the judges' favourite would receive ten points, second favourite nine points, and so on, and similarly with the viewers' rankings. The bottom ranked couple gets one point. In the event of tied scoring from the judges by two or more contestants, the couple immediately below them gets one point below them, until the bottom ranked couple on the leaderboard who ends up getting at least 2 points instead of one. The profits from the telephone lines were donated to Sport Relief in series 1, and to Children in Need from series 2 until series 8.

The judging panel initially consisted of Bruno Tonioli, Arlene Phillips, Len Goodman and Craig Revel Horwood. Alesha Dixon replaced Phillips from series 7 to 9, after which she left the programme to judge Britain's Got Talent which led to retired ballerina Dame Darcey Bussell to replace her. Goodman left the show after the 2016 series and was replaced by Shirley Ballas who was appointed as Head Judge following a selection process which attracted many candidates. Ballas was new to the show when she joined in 2017. Bussell remained as judge until 2018 and was replaced by Motsi Mabuse in 2019.

Up until 2020, Tonioli commuted weekly between Hollywood and London to judge both the American and British versions of the show simultaneously. Due to the outbreak of COVID-19 in 2020, he could not appear on both the British and American shows. No replacement was named for the 2020 series. Pro dancer Anton Du Beke took his place from the 2021 series, and since then is now a full-time judge, having replaced Tonioli on the panel. The current judging panel consists of Craig Revel Horwood, Motsi Mabuse, Shirley Ballas and Anton Du Beke, making Horwood the only judge to remain with the programme since its inception and only missing one episode in the show's history. Each judge gives the performance a mark out of ten, giving an overall total out of forty. The voice-over announcer since its inception has been Alan Dedicoat.

The singers on the show are Tommy Blaize, Hayley Sanderson, Lance Ellington, Andrea Grant and formerly British dance music vocalist Tara McDonald. The music director is Dave Arch who is often seen on camera. Tommy Blaize has been part of Strictly since its beginning. Arch joined in the fourth series and Hayley Sanderson in the fifth. The original musical director from series 1 to 3 was Laurie Holloway. In the seventeenth series, the singers were joined by Mitchel Emms.

The show was broadcast from a specially constructed set at BBC Television Centre, primarily in the largest studio, TC1 until its closure in 2013, with the show moving to Elstree Studios' George Lucas Stage 2 from 2013 onwards. In the first two series, shows were also filmed at the Tower Ballroom in Blackpool, where the original Come Dancing series was filmed in the 1970s.

In the second series, two shows were filmed at the Tower Ballroom, show five and the Grand Final, which was broadcast live on 11 December 2004. In 2005, the BBC announced that they would not be returning to the venue for the third series because of "logistical problems". In October 2008, Craig Revel Horwood called for the series to return to the Tower Ballroom, saying, "The atmosphere was electric. It's huge and has so much history. The Tower Ballroom puts a lot of pressure on the professionals and the celebrities to perform to the best of their potential. What a wonderful place to go live to 12 million people. We have got to get the BBC to bring Strictly Come Dancing back to Blackpool."

For series 7, the show returned to the Tower Ballroom, where Blackpool-born Craig Kelly was eliminated. The episode was aired live on 7 November 2009. Strictly Come Dancing returned to Blackpool for the 2010 and 2011 series. After series 10, when Strictly Come Dancing did not go to Blackpool, they announced that they would return for series 11.

== Cast ==
=== Presenters and judges ===
Colour key

Main host
Companion show host
Judge
Guest judge
Contestant
Professional dancer
Guest host
Online/podcast host

| Cast member | Series | | | | | | | | | | | | | | | | | | | | | | | |
| Cast member | 1 | 2 | 3 | 4 | 5 | 6 | 7 | 8 | 9 | 10 | 11 | 12 | 13 | 14 | 15 | 16 | 17 | 18 | 19 | 20 | 21 | 22 | 23 | 24 |
| Cast member | 2004 | 2004 | 2005 | 2006 | 2007 | 2008 | 2009 | 2010 | 2011 | 2012 | 2013 | 2014 | 2015 | 2016 | 2017 | 2018 | 2019 | 2020 | 2021 | 2022 | 2023 | 2024 | 2025 | 2026 |
Hosts
| Bruce Forsyth | ● | ● | ● | ● | ● | ● | ● | ● | ● | ● | ● | | | | | | | | | | | | | |
| Tess Daly | ● | ● | ● | ● | ● | ● | ● | ● | ● | ● | ● | ● | ● | ● | ● | ● | ● | ● | ● | ● | ● | ● | ● | |
| Claudia Winkleman (Note: In the eighth series Winkleman presented the results show and It Takes Two, and presented the results show only between series 9 and series 11. She presented one episode of the main show in both series 7 and series 10, and three episodes in series 11, all in Forsyth's absence.) | | ● | ● | ● | ● | ● | ● | ● | ● | ● | ● | ● | ● | ● | ● | ● | ● | ● | ● | ● | ● | ● | ● | |
| Emma Willis | | | | | | | | | | | | | | | | | | | | | | | | ● |
| Josh Widdicombe (Note: Widdicombe competed in the 2024 Christmas special, partnered with Karen Hauer.) | | | | | | | | | | | | | | | | | | | | | | | | ● |
| Johannes Radebe | | | | | | | | | | | | | | | | ● | ● | ● | ● | ● | ● | ● | ● | ● |
Companion Show Hosts
| Justin Lee Collins | ● | | | | | | | | | | | | | | | | | | | | | | | |
| Zoe Ball (Note: In the twelfth series, Ball co-presented three weeks of the main show with Tess Daly while Claudia Winkleman was absent.) | | | ● | | | | | | ● | ● | ● | ● | ● | ● | ● | ● | ● | ● | | | | | | |
| Rylan Clark | | | | | | | | | | | | | | | | | ● | ● | ● | ● | | | | |
| Janette Manrara | | | | | | | | | | | ● | ● | ● | ● | ● | ● | ● | ● | ● | ● | ● | ● | ● | |
| Fleur East | | | | | | | | | | | | | | | | | | | | ● | ● | ● | ● | |
| Ellie Taylor | | | | | | | | | | | | | | | | | | | | ● | | | | ● |
Online Hosts
| Ore Oduba | | | | | | | | | | | | | | ● | ● | | | | | | | | | |
| Scott Mills | | | | | | | | | | | | ● | | | | ● | | | | | | | | |
| Amy Elizabeth | | | | | | | | | | | | | | | | ● | | | | | | | | |
| Joe Sugg | | | | | | | | | | | | | | | | ● | ● | ● | ● | ● | ● | | | |
| Kim Winston | | | | | | | | | | | | | | | | | ● | ● | ● | ● | ● | | | |
| Tyler West | | | | | | | | | | | | | | | | | | | | ● | | | | ● |
| Abi Clarke | | | | | | | | | | | | | | | | | | | | | | | | ● |
Guest Hosts
| Natasha Kaplinsky (Note: Kaplinsky presented the first five episodes of the second series as maternity cover for Daly.) | ● | ● | | | | | | | | | | | | | | | | | | | | | | |
| Ronnie Corbett (Note: Corbett co-presented one episode of the seventh series with Daly and Winkleman.) | | | | | | | ● | | | | | | | | | | | | | | | | | |
| Gethin Jones (Note: Jones has guest presented It Takes Two a number of times.) | | | | | | | | | | | | | | ● | | ● | ● | | | | | | | |
Judges
| Craig Revel Horwood | ● | ● | ● | ● | ● | ● | ● | ● | ● | ● | ● | ● | ● | ● | ● | ● | ● | ● | ● | ● | ● | ● | ● | ● |
| Arlene Phillips | ● | ● | ● | ● | ● | ● | | | | | | | | | | | | | | | | | | |
| Len Goodman | ● | ● | ● | ● | ● | ● | ● | ● | ● | ● | ● | ● | ● | ● | | | | | | | | | | |
| Bruno Tonioli (Note: Tonioli did not appear on the judging panel for the eighteenth due to travel restrictions imposed by the COVID-19 pandemic and his role on the American version. Tonioli instead appeared virtually to give his critiques on the performances during the Sunday night results show) | ● | ● | ● | ● | ● | ● | ● | ● | ● | ● | ● | ● | ● | ● | ● | ● | ● | | | | | | | |
| Alesha Dixon | | | | | ● | | ● | ● | ● | | | | | | | | | | | | | | | |
| Darcey Bussell | | | | | | | ● | | | ● | ● | ● | ● | ● | ● | ● | | | | | | | | |
| Shirley Ballas | | | | | | | | | | | | | | | ● | ● | ● | ● | ● | ● | ● | ● | ● | ● |
| Motsi Mabuse | | | | | | | | | | | | | | | | | ● | ● | ● | ● | ● | ● | ● | ● |
| Anton Du Beke (Note: Du Beke also served as a guest judge during weeks 4 and 5 of the eighteenth series.) | ● | ● | ● | ● | ● | ● | ● | ● | ● | ● | ● | ● | ● | ● | ● | ● | ● | ● | ● | ● | ● | ● | ● | ● |
Guest Judges
| Jennifer Grey | | | | | | | | | ● | | | | | | | | | | | | | | | |
| Donny Osmond | | | | | | | | | | | | ● | | | | | | | | | | | | |
| Alfonso Ribeiro | | | | | | | | | | | | | | | | ● | ● | | | | | | | |
| Cynthia Erivo (Note: Erivo served as a guest mentor during week 3 of the twenty-third series, sitting alongside the judging panel but not scoring.) | | | | | | | | | | | | | | | | | | | ● | | | | ● | |

=== Professional dancers ===
Each series, celebrities are paired with professional dance partners who instruct them in the various dance styles, design their choreography, and perform with them each week in the competition. For the eighth series, the show introduced the Strictly Showdancers, a dance troupe which consisted of professional dancers who performed on the show but were not paired with celebrity partners. This did not return in subsequent series.

Color key

Professional
Did not receive a celebrity partner
Winner
Upcoming series

| Professional dancer | Series | | | | | | | | | | | | | | | | | | | | | | | |
| Professional dancer | 1 2004 | 2 2004 | 3 2005 | 4 2006 | 5 2007 | 6 2008 | 7 2009 | 8 2010 | 9 2011 | 10 2012 | 11 2013 | 12 2014 | 13 2015 | 14 2016 | 15 2017 | 16 2018 | 17 2019 | 18 2020 | 19 2021 | 20 2022 | 21 2023 | 22 2024 | 23 2025 | 24 2026 |
|---|---|---|---|---|---|---|---|---|---|---|---|---|---|---|---|---|---|---|---|---|---|---|---|---|
| Brendan Cole | ● | ● | ● | ● | ● | ● | ● | ● | ● | ● | ● | ● | ● | ● | ● | | | | | | | | | |
| Anton Du Beke | ● | ● | ● | ● | ● | ● | ● | ● | ● | ● | ● | ● | ● | ● | ● | ● | ● | ● | | | | | | |
| Hanna Karttunen | ● | | | | | | | | | | | | | | | | | | | | | | | |
| Kylie Jones | ● | | | | | | | | | | | | | | | | | | | | | | | |
| Paul Killick | ● | ● | | | | | | | | | | | | | | | | | | | | | | |
| John Byrnes | ● | | | | | | | | | | | | | | | | | | | | | | | |
| Camilla Dallerup | ● | ● | ● | ● | ● | ● | | | | | | | | | | | | | | | | | | |
| Erin Boag | ● | ● | ● | ● | ● | ● | ● | ● | ● | ● | | | | | | | | | | | | | | |
| Nicole Cutler | | ● | | ● | ● | | | | | | | | | | | | | | | | | | | |
| Hazel Newberry | | ● | | | | | | | | | | | | | | | | | | | | | | |
| Ian Waite | | ● | ● | ● | ● | ● | ● | ● | | | | | | | | | | | | | | | | |
| Lilia Kopylova | | ● | ● | ● | ● | ● | ● | | | | | | | | | | | | | | | | | |
| Darren Bennett | | ● | ● | ● | ● | ● | ● | ● | | | | | | | | | | | | | | | | |
| Matthew Cutler | | | ● | ● | ● | ● | ● | | | | | | | | | | | | | | | | | |
| Hanna Haarala | | | ● | | | | | | | | | | | | | | | | | | | | | |
| Andrew Cuerden | | | ● | | | | | | | | | | | | | | | | | | | | | |
| Karen Hardy | | | ● | ● | ● | ● | | | | | | | | | | | | | | | | | | |
| Izabela Hannah | | | ● | | | | | | | | | | | | | | | | | | | | | |
| Flavia Cacace | | | | ● | ● | ● | ● | ● | ● | ● | | | | | | | | | | | | | | |
| James Jordan | | | | ● | ● | ● | ● | ● | ● | ● | ● | | | | | | | | | | | | | |
| Ola Jordan | | | | ● | ● | ● | ● | ● | ● | ● | ● | ● | ● | | | | | | | | | | | |
| Vincent Simone | | | | ● | ● | ● | ● | ● | ● | ● | | | | | | | | | | | | | | |
| Brian Fortuna | | | | | | ● | ● | | | | | | | | | | | | | | | | | |
| Hayley Holt | | | | | | ● | | | | | | | | | | | | | | | | | | |
| Kristina Rihanoff | | | | | | ● | ● | ● | ● | ● | ● | ● | ● | | | | | | | | | | | |
| Natalie Lowe | | | | | | | ● | ● | ● | ● | | ● | ● | ● | | | | | | | | | | |
| Aliona Vilani | | | | | | | ● | ● | ● | | ● | ● | ● | | | | | | | | | | | |
| Katya Virshilas | | | | | | | ● | ● | ● | | | | | | | | | | | | | | | |
| Artem Chigvintsev | | | | | | | | ● | ● | ● | ● | | | | | | | | | | | | | |
| Jared Murillo | | | | | | | | ● | | | | | | | | | | | | | | | | |
| Crystal Main | | | | | | | | ● | | | | | | | | | | | | | | | | |
| Aneta Piotrowska | | | | | | | | ● | | | | | | | | | | | | | | | | |
| Shem Jacobs | | | | | | | | ● | | | | | | | | | | | | | | | | |
| Tanya Perera | | | | | | | | ● | | | | | | | | | | | | | | | | |
| Robin Windsor | | | | | | | | ● | ● | ● | ● | | | | | | | | | | | | | |
| Pasha Kovalev | | | | | | | | | ● | ● | ● | ● | ● | ● | ● | ● | | | | | | | | |
| Karen Hauer | | | | | | | | | | ● | ● | ● | ● | ● | ● | ● | ● | ● | ● | ● | ● | ● | ● | |
| Iveta Lukošiūtė | | | | | | | | | | ● | ● | ● | | | | | | | | | | | | |
| Kevin Clifton | | | | | | | | | | | ● | ● | ● | ● | ● | ● | ● | | | | | | | |
| Anya Garnis | | | | | | | | | | | ● | ● | | | | | | | | | | | | |
| Janette Manrara | | | | | | | | | | | ● | ● | ● | ● | ● | ● | ● | ● | | | | | | |
| Aljaž Škorjanec | | | | | | | | | | | ● | ● | ● | ● | ● | ● | ● | ● | ● | | | ● | ● | ● |
| Joanne Clifton | | | | | | | | | | | | ● | ● | ● | | | | | | | | | | |
| Tristan MacManus | | | | | | | | | | | | ● | ● | | | | | | | | | | | |
| Trent Whiddon | | | | | | | | | | | | ● | | | | | | | | | | | | |
| Oti Mabuse | | | | | | | | | | | | | ● | ● | ● | ● | ● | ● | ● | | | | | |
| Giovanni Pernice | | | | | | | | | | | | | ● | ● | ● | ● | ● | ● | ● | ● | ● | | | |
| Gleb Savchenko | | | | | | | | | | | | | ● | | | | | | | | | | | |
| Chloe Hewitt | | | | | | | | | | | | | | ● | ● | | | | | | | | | |
| Katya Jones | | | | | | | | | | | | | | ● | ● | ● | ● | ● | ● | ● | ● | ● | ● | ● |
| Neil Jones | | | | | | | | | | | | | | ● | ● | ● | ● | ● | ● | ● | ● | ● | ● | ● |
| Gorka Márquez | | | | | | | | | | | | | | ● | ● | ● | ● | ● | ● | ● | ● | ● | ● | |
| Oksana Platero | | | | | | | | | | | | | | ● | | | | | | | | | | |
| AJ Pritchard | | | | | | | | | | | | | | ● | ● | ● | ● | | | | | | | |
| Dianne Buswell | | | | | | | | | | | | | | | ● | ● | ● | ● | ● | ● | ● | ● | ● | ● |
| Nadiya Bychkova | | | | | | | | | | | | | | | ● | ● | ● | ● | ● | ● | ● | ● | ● | |
| Amy Dowden | | | | | | | | | | | | | | | ● | ● | ● | ● | ● | ● | | ● | ● | ● |
| Graziano Di Prima | | | | | | | | | | | | | | | | ● | ● | ● | ● | ● | ● | | | |
| Luba Mushtuk | | | | | | | | | | | | | | | | ● | ● | ● | ● | ● | ● | ● | ● | |
| Johannes Radebe | | | | | | | | | | | | | | | | ● | ● | ● | ● | ● | ● | ● | ● | |
| Nancy Xu | | | | | | | | | | | | | | | | | ● | ● | ● | ● | ● | ● | ● | ● |
| Cameron Lombard | | | | | | | | | | | | | | | | | | | ● | ● | | | | |
| Nikita Kuzmin | | | | | | | | | | | | | | | | | | | ● | ● | ● | ● | ● | ● |
| Jowita Przystał | | | | | | | | | | | | | | | | | | | ● | ● | ● | ● | ● | ● |
| Kai Widdrington | | | | | | | | | | | | | | | | | | | ● | ● | ● | ● | ● | ● |
| Vito Coppola | | | | | | | | | | | | | | | | | | | | ● | ● | ● | ● | ● |
| Carlos Gu | | | | | | | | | | | | | | | | | | | | ● | ● | ● | ● | ● |
| Lauren Oakley | | | | | | | | | | | | | | | | | | | | ● | ● | ● | ● | ● |
| Michelle Tsiakkas | | | | | | | | | | | | | | | | | | | | ● | ● | ● | ● | |
| Julian Caillon | | | | | | | | | | | | | | | | | | | | | | | ● | ● |
| Alexis Warr | | | | | | | | | | | | | | | | | | | | | | | ● | ● |
| Maddie Ingoldsby | | | | | | | | | | | | | | | | | | | | | | | | ● |
| Aleksandra Isaeva | | | | | | | | | | | | | | | | | | | | | | | | ● |
| Mark Karmalita | | | | | | | | | | | | | | | | | | | | | | | | ● |
| Lethabo Monametsi | | | | | | | | | | | | | | | | | | | | | | | | ● |
| Cristian Priori | | | | | | | | | | | | | | | | | | | | | | | | ● |

Many of the dancers from the show have formed both professional and personal partnerships. Darren Bennett and Lilia Kopylova are married, as are James and Ola Jordan. Aljaž Škorjanec and Janette Manrara, who became engaged after joining the show in 2013, were married in 2017. Matthew and Nicole Cutler are divorced, but remain professional partners. Karen Hauer and Kevin Clifton were engaged when Clifton entered the show in 2013 and were married prior to the 2015 series, before divorcing in 2018. Neil and Katya Jones entered the show as a married couple before separating in 2019.

Anton Du Beke and Erin Boag have danced as a professional couple since 1997. Vincent Simone and Flavia Cacace are former Argentine tango world champions as a duo and have done multiple tours together. Brendan Cole and Camilla Dallerup danced together for many years, including a stint on the original series of Come Dancing. Following their split in 2004, Cole and Katya Virshilas formed a professional partnership before splitting in November 2009.

Other current and former professional partnerships featured on the show include Dallerup and Ian Waite, Paul Killick and Hanna Karttunen, Andrew Cuerden and Hanna Haarala, Brian Fortuna and Kristina Rihanoff, Rihanoff and Robin Windsor, Pasha Kovalev and Anya Garnis, siblings Kevin and Joanne Clifton, AJ Pritchard and Chloe Hewitt, and Gorka Márquez and Karen Hauer.

== Presentation ==
=== Dances ===
On average, dances last for approximately 90 seconds. Musical accompaniment is provided by an in-house band, led by Dave Arch.

=== Themed weeks ===
Since the eighth series in 2010, the show includes themed weeks which are held at varying points during the competition. Since Series 20, Movie Week falls on the third week, Halloween Week falls on the sixth week, Blackpool Week falls on the ninth week, and Musicals Week falls on the eleventh week and during the Quarter-finals. Series 22 introduced Icons Week, which originally fell on the seventh week and then on the fifth week in Series 23.

In Series 24, Movie Week was held on the second week instead of the third week thus meaning, for the first time in the show's history, all couples took part in a themed week of the competition.

Table key
| Yes | Recurring |
| Yes (Debut) | Debut appearance |
| No | Discontinued |
| —N/a | Absent |

| Theme or location | Series | | | | | | | | | | | | | | | | |
| Theme or location | 8 | 9 | 10 | 11 | 12 | 13 | 14 | 15 | 16 | 17 | 18 | 19 | 20 | 21 | 22 | 23 | 24 |
|---|---|---|---|---|---|---|---|---|---|---|---|---|---|---|---|---|---|
| Halloween | Yes (Debut) | Yes | | | | | | | | | —N/a | Yes | | | | | |
| Blackpool (Note: Blackpool has also hosted for one week in the first two series; in addition, it staged the grand finals of the second and ninth series, the latter in place of its usual appearance as a themed week. It was absent from the 10th series and later for the 18th and 19th series due to the COVID-19 pandemic.) | Yes (Debut) | —N/a | | Yes | | | | | | | —N/a | | Yes | | | | |
| Movie | Yes (Debut) | Yes | No | | Yes | | | | | | | | | | | | |
| Broadway | | Yes (Debut) | No | | | | | | | | | | | | | | |
| Best of Britain (Note: Filmed at Wembley Arena) | | Yes (Debut) | No | | | | | | | | | | | | | | |
| Hollywood | | | Yes (Debut) | No | | | | | | | | | | | | | |
| Wembley Arena | | | Yes (Debut) | No | | | | | | | | | | | | | |
| Dance Fusion (Note: Replaced the Dance-a-thon challenge which was first featured in the seventh series) | | | Yes (Debut) | No | | | | | | | | | | | | | |
| Love | | | | Yes (Debut) | No | | | | | | | | | | | | |
| Musicals | | | | Yes (Debut) | No | Yes | | | | | | | | | | | |
| "Around the World" | | | | | Yes (Debut) | No | | | | | | | | | | | |
| Celebrating BBC 100 (Note: A one-off themed week to celebrate the BBC's 100th anniversary) | | | | | | | | | | | | | Yes (Debut) | No | | | |
| Icons | | | | | | | | | | | | | | | Yes (Debut) | Yes | |

=== Results show ===
From series 1 to 4, the results show was shown live on Saturday night one hour after the performances.

As of series 5, the results show is recorded on the Saturday night directly after the live show and incorporates the result of the viewers' votes, which are completed by 21:30. This was confirmed by the official BBC website in 2008:

The Sunday show is recorded on Saturday night but no element involving the results of the vote will start recording until after lines are closed and votes counted and verified.

Throughout the Sunday results show, the presenters refer to "Saturday night" in reference to the main show due to the timing of the Sunday programme, and the outfits of Tess Daly, Claudia Winkleman and the judges are changed to present an illusion of a second live broadcast while the couples wore the same performance outfits.

For series 7, the Sunday results show was cancelled and returned to Saturday nights as a result of a revamp of the show. It then reverted to Sundays from series 8.

=== Dance-off ===
A new system called the dance-off, which takes place in the results show, was introduced in series 5. It continued until series 7, but did not return in series 8. It was then reinstated in series 10 and has remained a feature of the show ever since.

The dance-off consists of the two couples who received the lowest totals that week from the combined judges' scores and public vote. The aim of the dance-off is for the couples to convince the judges that they deserve to go through to the following week's competition. Before they attempt their dance a second time, the couples sometimes get advice from the judges. The judges then decide which couple remains in the competition based on the dance-off performances.

If three of the judges agree that one of the couples should be saved, that couple is through to the following week's competition and the Head Judge's vote is not counted. If one couple has two votes and the other couple has one vote, then the deciding vote is cast by the head judge, originally Len Goodman and later Shirley Ballas. As of series 23, the deciding vote instead rotates weekly between each regular judge. The Monday after their elimination, the eliminated couple appear on It Takes Two to discuss their time on the programme. Series 23 contestant Balvinder Sopal and her partner Julian Caillon hold the record for the most dance-off victories, having been saved by the judges on five occasions.

On two occasions, the dance-off was cancelled due to a couple in the bottom two being unable to dance due to injury. Firstly, in series 14, Anastacia sustained an injury and was unable to compete in the dance-off as a result. Under the rules of the show, the couple with the lowest combined total was eliminated, and Anastacia continued in the competition. The second occasion in which the dance-off was cancelled was in series 20, again due to an injury sustained by Tony Adams. Tess Daly announced on the results show that Adams had decided to withdraw from the competition as a result of being unable to compete in the dance-off.

=== It Takes Two ===
During the run of Strictly Come Dancing, Strictly Come Dancing: It Takes Two is broadcast each weeknight on BBC Two. The series was previously hosted by Claudia Winkleman but, due to her pregnancy in 2011, she had to leave the series, and was replaced by Zoe Ball, who hosted the show from series 9 to 18. Rylan Clark joined as co-host in series 17. In May 2021, it was announced that Ball would leave the show after 10 years, and on 10 June 2021, her replacement was announced to be former professional Janette Manrara.

The show features reviews of the performances during the previous Saturday's show and interviews with, and training footage of, the couples preparing for the next show. The judges and other celebrities also provide their opinions on how the couples are progressing. It Takes Two replaced Strictly Come Dancing on Three, hosted by Justin Lee Collins, which ran on BBC Three during the first series. Prior to 2010, BBC Two Scotland aired the programme on four nights only, running its own Gaelic-language programming on Thursdays instead.

== Series overview ==
| Series | Contestants | Episodes | Originally released | | Winners | Runners-up |
| Series | Contestants | Episodes | First released | Last released | Winners | Runners-up |
|---|---|---|---|---|---|---|
| 1 | 8 | 9 | 15 May 2004 | 3 July 2004 | Natasha Kaplinsky & Brendan Cole | Christopher Parker & Hanna Karttunen |
| 2 | 10 | 16 | 23 October 2004 | 11 December 2004 | Jill Halfpenny & Darren Bennett | Denise Lewis & Ian Waite |
| 3 | 12 | 20 | 15 October 2005 | 17 December 2005 | Darren Gough & Lilia Kopylova | Colin Jackson & Erin Boag |
| 4 | 14 | 24 | 7 October 2006 | 23 December 2006 | Mark Ramprakash & Karen Hardy | Matt Dawson & Lilia Kopylova |
| 5 | 14 | 24 | 6 October 2007 | 22 December 2007 | Alesha Dixon & Matthew Cutler | Matt Di Angelo & Flavia Cacace |
| 6 | 16 | 28 | 20 September 2008 | 20 December 2008 | Tom Chambers & Camilla Dallerup | Rachel Stevens & Vincent Simone |
| 7 | 16 | 19 | 18 September 2009 | 19 December 2009 | Chris Hollins & Ola Jordan | Ricky Whittle & Natalie Lowe |
| 8 | 14 | 26 | 1 October 2010 | 18 December 2010 | Kara Tointon & Artem Chigvintsev | Matt Baker & Aliona Vilani |
| 9 | 14 | 25 | 30 September 2011 | 17 December 2011 | Harry Judd & Aliona Vilani | Chelsee Healey & Pasha Kovalev |
| 10 | 14 | 25 | 5 October 2012 | 22 December 2012 | Louis Smith & Flavia Cacace | Denise van Outen & James Jordan; Kimberley Walsh & Pasha Kovalev |
| 11 | 15 | 27 | 27 September 2013 | 21 December 2013 | Abbey Clancy & Aljaž Škorjanec | Natalie Gumede & Artem Chigvintsev; Susanna Reid & Kevin Clifton |
| 12 | 15 | 27 | 26 September 2014 | 20 December 2014 | Caroline Flack & Pasha Kovalev | Frankie Bridge & Kevin Clifton; Simon Webbe & Kristina Rihanoff |
| 13 | 15 | 27 | 25 September 2015 | 19 December 2015 | Jay McGuiness & Aliona Vilani | Georgia May Foote & Giovanni Pernice; Kellie Bright & Kevin Clifton |
| 14 | 15 | 26 | 23 September 2016 | 17 December 2016 | Ore Oduba & Joanne Clifton | Danny Mac & Oti Mabuse; Louise Redknapp & Kevin Clifton |
| 15 | 15 | 25 | 23 September 2017 | 16 December 2017 | Joe McFadden & Katya Jones | Alexandra Burke & Gorka Márquez; Debbie McGee & Giovanni Pernice; Gemma Atkinson & Aljaž Škorjanec |
| 16 | 15 | 25 | 22 September 2018 | 15 December 2018 | Stacey Dooley & Kevin Clifton | Ashley Roberts & Pasha Kovalev; Faye Tozer & Giovanni Pernice; Joe Sugg & Dianne Buswell |
| 17 | 15 | 25 | 21 September 2019 | 14 December 2019 | Kelvin Fletcher & Oti Mabuse | Emma Barton & Anton Du Beke; Karim Zeroual & Amy Dowden |
| 18 | 12 | 17 | 24 October 2020 | 19 December 2020 | Bill Bailey & Oti Mabuse | HRVY & Janette Manrara; Jamie Laing & Karen Hauer; Maisie Smith & Gorka Márquez |
| 19 | 15 | 25 | 25 September 2021 | 18 December 2021 | Rose Ayling-Ellis & Giovanni Pernice | John Whaite & Johannes Radebe |
| 20 | 15 | 25 | 24 September 2022 | 17 December 2022 | Hamza Yassin & Jowita Przystał | Fleur East & Vito Coppola; Helen Skelton & Gorka Márquez; Molly Rainford & Carlos Gu |
| 21 | 15 | 25 | 23 September 2023 | 16 December 2023 | Ellie Leach & Vito Coppola | Bobby Brazier & Dianne Buswell; Layton Williams & Nikita Kuzmin |
| 22 | 15 | 25 | 21 September 2024 | 14 December 2024 | Chris McCausland & Dianne Buswell | Sarah Hadland & Vito Coppola; JB Gill & Lauren Oakley; Tasha Ghouri & Aljaž Škorjanec |
| 23 | 15 | 25 | 27 September 2025 | 20 December 2025 | Karen Carney & Carlos Gu | Amber Davies & Nikita Kuzmin; George Clarke & Alexis Warr |
| 24 | 15 | 25 | 19 September 2026 | December 2026 | TBA | TBA |

=== Series 1 (2004) ===
In May 2004, Strictly Come Dancing began its first series. This was the only series to air in the spring; all subsequent series aired in the autumn.

| Celebrity | Notability | Professional partner | Result |
|---|---|---|---|
| Jason Wood | Comedian | Kylie Jones | Eliminated 1st |
| David Dickinson | Bargain Hunt presenter & antiques expert | Camilla Dallerup | Eliminated 2nd |
| Verona Joseph | Holby City actress | Paul Killick | Eliminated 3rd |
| Claire Sweeney | Actress, singer & television presenter | John Byrnes | Eliminated 4th |
| Martin Offiah | England rugby player | Erin Boag | Eliminated 5th |
| Lesley Garrett | Classical singer | Anton Du Beke | Eliminated 6th |
| Christopher Parker | EastEnders actor | Hanna Karttunen | Runners-up |
| Natasha Kaplinsky | Journalist & television presenter | Brendan Cole | Winners |

=== Series 2 (2004) ===
The second series began in October 2004. A new spin-off show, Strictly Come Dancing: It Takes Two, presented by Claudia Winkleman, premiered and has continued to air alongside each subsequent series on BBC Two.

| Celebrity | Notability | Professional partner | Result |
|---|---|---|---|
| Quentin Willson | Motoring journalist & television presenter | Hazel Newberry | Eliminated 1st |
| Carol Vorderman | Countdown presenter | Paul Killick | Eliminated 2nd |
| Esther Rantzen | Journalist & television presenter | Anton Du Beke | Eliminated 3rd |
| Diarmuid Gavin | Garden designer & television presenter | Nicole Cutler | Eliminated 4th |
| Sarah Manners | Casualty actress | Brendan Cole | Eliminated 5th |
| Roger Black | Olympic sprinter & sports presenter | Camilla Dallerup | Eliminated 6th |
| Aled Jones | Singer & television presenter | Lilia Kopylova | Eliminated 7th |
| Julian Clary | Stand-up comedian | Erin Boag | Third place |
| Denise Lewis | Olympic heptathlete | Ian Waite | Runners-up |
| Jill Halfpenny | EastEnders actress | Darren Bennett | Winners |

=== Series 3 (2005) ===
The third series began in October 2005.

| Celebrity | Notability | Professional partner | Result |
|---|---|---|---|
| Siobhan Hayes | My Family actress | Matthew Cutler | Eliminated 1st |
| Jaye Jacobs | Holby City actress | Andrew Cuerden | Eliminated 2nd |
| Gloria Hunniford | Television & radio presenter | Darren Bennett | Eliminated 3rd |
| Fiona Phillips | GMTV presenter | Brendan Cole | Eliminated 4th |
| Dennis Taylor | Snooker player | Izabela Hannah | Eliminated 5th |
| Will Thorp | Casualty actor | Hanna Haarala | Eliminated 6th |
| Bill Turnbull | BBC Breakfast presenter & journalist | Karen Hardy | Eliminated 7th |
| Patsy Palmer | EastEnders actress | Anton Du Beke | Eliminated 8th |
| James Martin | Chef & television presenter | Camilla Dallerup | Eliminated 9th |
| Zoe Ball | Television & radio presenter | Ian Waite | Third place |
| Colin Jackson | Olympic hurdler | Erin Boag | Runners-up |
| Darren Gough | England cricketer | Lilia Kopylova | Winners |

=== Series 4 (2006) ===
The fourth series began in October 2006.

| Celebrity | Notability | Professional partner | Result |
|---|---|---|---|
| Nicholas Owen | ITV News presenter & journalist | Nicole Cutler | Eliminated 1st |
| Mica Paris | Singer & television presenter | Ian Waite | Eliminated 2nd |
| Jimmy Tarbuck | Comedian | Flavia Cacace | Withdrew |
| DJ Spoony | DJ & BBC Radio 1 presenter | Ola Jordan | Eliminated 3rd |
| Georgina Bouzova | Casualty actress | James Jordan | Eliminated 4th |
| Jan Ravens | Actress & impressionist | Anton Du Beke | Eliminated 5th |
| Ray Fearon | Stage & screen actor | Camilla Dallerup | Eliminated 6th |
| Peter Schmeichel | Manchester United goalkeeper | Erin Boag | Eliminated 7th |
| Claire King | Emmerdale actress | Brendan Cole | Eliminated 8th |
| Carol Smillie | Television presenter | Matthew Cutler | Eliminated 9th |
| Louisa Lytton | EastEnders actress | Vincent Simone | Eliminated 10th |
| Emma Bunton | Spice Girls singer | Darren Bennett | Eliminated 11th |
| Matt Dawson | England rugby player | Lilia Kopylova | Runners-up |
| Mark Ramprakash | England cricketer | Karen Hardy | Winners |

=== Series 5 (2007) ===
The fifth series began in September 2007. The first programme was a preview of the new series before the competition began. In a change to the previous format, the results show was recorded on Saturday and broadcast on Sunday, rather than shown live later on Saturday. Additionally, the two couples at the bottom of the table after the public vote were subject to a dance-off, where they performed their routine again for the judges, who decided which couple would leave the competition.

| Celebrity | Notability | Professional partner | Result |
|---|---|---|---|
| Brian Capron | Coronation Street actor | Karen Hardy | Eliminated 1st |
| Stephanie Beacham | Stage & screen actress | Vincent Simone | Eliminated 2nd |
| Willie Thorne | Snooker player | Erin Boag | Eliminated 3rd |
| Gabby Logan | BBC Sport presenter | James Jordan | Eliminated 4th |
| Dominic Littlewood | Journalist & television presenter | Lilia Kopylova | Eliminated 5th |
| Penny Lancaster-Stewart | Model & photographer | Ian Waite | Eliminated 6th |
| Kate Garraway | GMTV presenter | Anton Du Beke | Eliminated 7th |
| John Barnes | England footballer | Nicole Cutler | Eliminated 8th |
| Kelly Brook | Model & actress | Brendan Cole | Withdrew |
| Kenny Logan | Scotland rugby player | Ola Jordan | Eliminated 9th |
| Letitia Dean | EastEnders actress | Darren Bennett | Eliminated 10th |
| Gethin Jones | Blue Peter presenter | Camilla Dallerup | Eliminated 11th |
| Matt Di Angelo | EastEnders actor | Flavia Cacace | Runners-up |
| Alesha Dixon | Mis-Teeq singer | Matthew Cutler | Winners |

=== Series 6 (2008) ===
A sixth series was confirmed after the dancers' pay dispute ended in June 2008. The sixth series began in September with a behind-the-scenes look at the new series, while the first live show aired on 20 September.

| Celebrity | Notability | Professional partner | Result |
|---|---|---|---|
| Phil Daniels | EastEnders actor | Flavia Cacace | Eliminated 1st |
| Gillian Taylforth | EastEnders actress | Anton Du Beke | Eliminated 2nd |
| Gary Rhodes | Chef & television presenter | Karen Hardy | Eliminated 3rd |
| Jessie Wallace | EastEnders actress | Darren Bennett | Eliminated 4th |
| Don Warrington | Film & television actor | Lilia Kopylova | Eliminated 5th |
| Mark Foster | Olympic swimmer | Hayley Holt | Eliminated 6th |
| Andrew Castle | GMTV presenter & tennis player | Ola Jordan | Eliminated 7th |
| Heather Small | M People singer | Brian Fortuna | Eliminated 8th |
| Cherie Lunghi | Stage & screen actress | James Jordan | Eliminated 9th |
| John Sergeant | Chief political correspondent | Kristina Rihanoff | Withdrew |
| Jodie Kidd | Fashion model | Ian Waite | Eliminated 10th |
| Christine Bleakley | The One Show presenter | Matthew Cutler | Eliminated 11th |
| Austin Healey | England rugby player | Erin Boag | Eliminated 12th |
| Lisa Snowdon | Model & television presenter | Brendan Cole | Third place |
| Rachel Stevens | S Club 7 singer | Vincent Simone | Runners-up |
| Tom Chambers | Holby City actor | Camilla Dallerup | Winners |

=== Series 7 (2009) ===
The seventh series began in September 2009. Alesha Dixon joined the judging panel, replacing Arlene Phillips, who moved to The One Show.

| Celebrity | Notability | Professional partner | Result |
|---|---|---|---|
| Martina Hingis | Professional tennis player | Matthew Cutler | Eliminated 1st |
| Richard Dunwoody | Jockey | Lilia Kopylova | Eliminated 2nd |
| Rav Wilding | Crimewatch presenter | Aliona Vilani | Eliminated 3rd |
| Lynda Bellingham | Actress & Loose Women panellist | Darren Bennett | Eliminated 4th |
| Joe Calzaghe | Professional boxer | Kristina Rihanoff | Eliminated 5th |
| Jo Wood | Model & entrepreneur | Brendan Cole | Eliminated 6th |
| Zöe Lucker | Footballers' Wives actress | James Jordan | Eliminated 7th |
| Craig Kelly | Coronation Street actor | Flavia Cacace | Eliminated 8th |
| Phil Tufnell | England cricketer | Katya Virshilas | Eliminated 9th |
| Jade Johnson | Olympic long jumper | Ian Waite | Withdrew |
| Ricky Groves | EastEnders actor | Erin Boag | Eliminated 10th |
| Natalie Cassidy | EastEnders actress | Vincent Simone | Eliminated 11th |
| Laila Rouass | Footballers' Wives actress | Anton Du Beke | Eliminated 12th |
| Ali Bastian | The Bill & Hollyoaks actress | Brian Fortuna | Eliminated 13th |
| Ricky Whittle | Hollyoaks actor | Natalie Lowe | Runners-up |
| Chris Hollins | BBC Breakfast sports presenter | Ola Jordan | Winners |

=== Series 8 (2010) ===
The eighth series began in September 2010.

| Celebrity | Notability | Professional partner | Result |
|---|---|---|---|
| Goldie | Musician & DJ | Kristina Rihanoff | Eliminated 1st |
| Paul Daniels | Magician | Ola Jordan | Eliminated 2nd |
| Peter Shilton | England goalkeeper | Erin Boag | Eliminated 3rd |
| Tina O'Brien | Coronation Street actress | Jared Murillo | Eliminated 4th |
| Jimi Mistry | Film & television actor | Flavia Cacace | Eliminated 5th |
| Michelle Williams | Destiny's Child singer | Brendan Cole | Eliminated 6th |
| Felicity Kendal | Stage & screen actress | Vincent Simone | Eliminated 7th |
| Patsy Kensit | Film & television actress | Robin Windsor | Eliminated 8th |
| Ann Widdecombe | Conservative Party politician | Anton Du Beke | Eliminated 9th |
| Gavin Henson | Wales rugby player | Katya Virshilas | Eliminated 10th |
| Scott Maslen | EastEnders & The Bill actor | Natalie Lowe | Eliminated 11th |
| Pamela Stephenson | Comedian & psychologist | James Jordan | Third place |
| Matt Baker | Television presenter | Aliona Vilani | Runners-up |
| Kara Tointon | EastEnders actress | Artem Chigvintsev | Winners |

=== Series 9 (2011) ===
The ninth series began in September 2011. The couples were paired up for the first time on the launch show. This was the last series to feature Alesha Dixon as a judge; she left the show to become a judge on Britain's Got Talent.

Zoe Ball replaced Claudia Winkleman as host of Strictly Come Dancing: It Takes Two due to Winkleman having just given birth.

| Celebrity | Notability | Professional partner | Result |
|---|---|---|---|
| Edwina Currie | Conservative Party politician | Vincent Simone | Eliminated 1st |
| Dan Lobb | Daybreak presenter & tennis player | Katya Virshilas | Eliminated 2nd |
| Rory Bremner | Comedian & impressionist | Erin Boag | Eliminated 3rd |
| Nancy Dell'Olio | Lawyer & media personality | Anton Du Beke | Eliminated 4th |
| Lulu | Singer-songwriter | Brendan Cole | Eliminated 5th |
| Audley Harrison | Heavyweight boxer | Natalie Lowe | Eliminated 6th |
| Russell Grant | Astrologer & entertainer | Flavia Cacace | Eliminated 7th |
| Anita Dobson | EastEnders actress | Robin Windsor | Eliminated 8th |
| Robbie Savage | Premier League footballer | Ola Jordan | Eliminated 9th |
| Alex Jones | The One Show presenter | James Jordan | Eliminated 10th & 11th |
| Holly Valance | Actress, singer & model | Artem Chigvintsev | Eliminated 10th & 11th |
| Jason Donovan | Actor & singer | Kristina Rihanoff | Third place |
| Chelsee Healey | Waterloo Road actress | Pasha Kovalev | Runners-up |
| Harry Judd | McFly drummer | Aliona Vilani | Winners |

=== Series 10 (2012) ===
The tenth series began in September 2012. Darcey Bussell joined the judging panel, replacing Alesha Dixon who moved to Britain's Got Talent.

| Celebrity | Notability | Professional partner | Result |
|---|---|---|---|
| Johnny Ball | Television presenter | Iveta Lukošiūtė | Eliminated 1st |
| Jerry Hall | Supermodel & actress | Anton Du Beke | Eliminated 2nd |
| Sid Owen | EastEnders actor | Ola Jordan | Eliminated 3rd |
| Colin Salmon | Film & television actor | Kristina Rihanoff | Eliminated 4th |
| Fern Britton | Television presenter | Artem Chigvintsev | Eliminated 5th |
| Richard Arnold | Daybreak presenter | Erin Boag | Eliminated 6th |
| Victoria Pendleton | Olympic track cyclist | Brendan Cole | Eliminated 7th |
| Michael Vaughan | England cricketer | Natalie Lowe | Eliminated 8th |
| Nicky Byrne | Westlife singer | Karen Hauer | Eliminated 9th |
| Lisa Riley | Emmerdale actress | Robin Windsor | Eliminated 10th |
| Dani Harmer | Children's television actress | Vincent Simone | Eliminated 11th |
| Denise van Outen | Actress, singer & presenter | James Jordan | Runners-up |
| Kimberley Walsh | Girls Aloud singer | Pasha Kovalev | Runners-up |
| Louis Smith | Olympic artistic gymnast | Flavia Cacace | Winners |

=== Series 11 (2013) ===
The eleventh series began in September 2013.

| Celebrity | Notability | Professional partner | Result |
|---|---|---|---|
| Tony Jacklin | Professional golfer | Aliona Vilani | Eliminated 1st |
| Vanessa Feltz | Television & radio presenter | James Jordan | Eliminated 2nd |
| Julien Macdonald | Fashion designer | Janette Manrara | Eliminated 3rd |
| Deborah Meaden | Dragons' Den investor & businesswoman | Robin Windsor | Eliminated 4th |
| Rachel Riley | Countdown presenter | Pasha Kovalev | Eliminated 5th |
| Dave Myers | Chef & The Hairy Bikers presenter | Karen Hauer | Eliminated 6th |
| Fiona Fullerton | Film & television actress | Anton Du Beke | Eliminated 7th |
| Ben Cohen | England rugby player | Kristina Rihanoff | Eliminated 8th |
| Mark Benton | Stage & screen actor | Iveta Lukošiūtė | Eliminated 9th |
| Ashley Taylor Dawson | Hollyoaks actor & singer | Ola Jordan | Eliminated 10th |
| Patrick Robinson | Casualty actor | Anya Garnis | Eliminated 11th |
| Sophie Ellis-Bextor | Singer-songwriter | Brendan Cole | Eliminated 12th |
| Natalie Gumede | Coronation Street actress | Artem Chigvintsev | Runners-up |
| Susanna Reid | BBC Breakfast presenter | Kevin Clifton | Runners-up |
| Abbey Clancy | Model & television presenter | Aljaž Škorjanec | Winners |

=== Series 12 (2014) ===
The series started on 7 September 2014 with a launch show, followed by the live shows starting on 26 and 27 September. This series was the first not to be presented by Sir Bruce Forsyth after announcing his departure from the live shows on 4 April (he made his final regular appearance in this series' launch show). However, Forsyth would continue to present special editions of the show, such as Children in Need and Christmas specials. It was announced on 9 May that Claudia Winkleman would join the main show as co-presenter and that her duties would mirror the existing result show format, with Tess Daly assuming Forsyth's role as main presenter and Winkleman taking Daly's role as co-presenter.

It was announced on 1 June 2014 that professional dancers Artem Chigvintsev, James Jordan and Anya Garnis would not be returning for the new series, although Garnis would remain on the show's choreography team. It was also announced that Tristan MacManus and Joanne Clifton would be joining the show's professional line-up. It was then announced in August that Robin Windsor had withdrawn from the competition due to a back injury. Windsor was replaced by new professional Trent Whiddon. In week three, entertainer Donny Osmond joined the four regular judges, making the maximum score that week 50 points. Due to Winkleman's absence in weeks 6, 7 and 8, It Takes Two presenter Zoe Ball co-presented with Daly.

| Celebrity | Notability | Professional partner | Result |
|---|---|---|---|
| Gregg Wallace | MasterChef judge | Aliona Vilani | Eliminated 1st |
| Jennifer Gibney | Mrs. Brown's Boys actress | Tristan MacManus | Eliminated 2nd |
| Tim Wonnacott | Bargain Hunt presenter & antiques expert | Natalie Lowe | Eliminated 3rd |
| Thom Evans | Scotland rugby player & model | Iveta Lukošiūtė | Eliminated 4th |
| Scott Mills | BBC Radio 1 presenter | Joanne Clifton | Eliminated 5th |
| Alison Hammond | Television presenter | Aljaž Škorjanec | Eliminated 6th |
| Judy Murray | Tennis coach & British Fed Cup captain | Anton Du Beke | Eliminated 7th |
| Steve Backshall | Naturalist, author & television presenter | Ola Jordan | Eliminated 8th |
| Sunetra Sarker | Casualty actress | Brendan Cole | Eliminated 9th |
| Pixie Lott | Singer-songwriter | Trent Whiddon | Eliminated 10th |
| Jake Wood | EastEnders actor | Janette Manrara | Eliminated 11th |
| Mark Wright | The Only Way Is Essex star | Karen Hauer | Eliminated 12th |
| Frankie Bridge | The Saturdays singer | Kevin Clifton | Runners-up |
| Simon Webbe | Blue singer & actor | Kristina Rihanoff | Runners-up |
| Caroline Flack | Television presenter | Pasha Kovalev | Winners |

=== Series 13 (2015) ===
Strictly Come Dancing returned for its thirteenth series with a launch show on 5 September 2015, followed by the live shows starting on 25 and 26 September.

On 23 April 2015, the list of professionals participating in the thirteenth series was revealed. Professionals from the last series who did not return included Trent Whiddon, Iveta Lukošiūtė and Joanne Clifton. Clifton would remain involved in group dances and would feature on Strictly Come Dancing: It Takes Two as a dance expert. Robin Windsor, absent from the previous series because of injury, also did not return for this series. Three new professional dancers were introduced: Russian dancer Gleb Savchenko (from the American, Australian and Russian versions of Dancing with the Stars), South African dancer Oti Mabuse (from Germany's Let's Dance) and Italian dancer Giovanni Pernice.

On 3 October 2015, the judges performed The Strictly, a signature dance made up of some iconic moves from the show's history for fans to do at home when they hear the theme tune; subsequently, a tutorial for the dance was made available on the show's website and iPlayer hosted by Natalie Lowe and Tristan MacManus.

Series 13 was the last to feature Tristan MacManus, Kristina Rihanoff, Ola Jordan, Gleb Savchenko and Aliona Vilani as professional dancers. Jordan later announced that she had quit the show, claiming that the results were "fixed". Vilani announced three days after winning that she was leaving the show; however, she participated in the 2016 live tour. Savchenko announced that he was leaving the show on 28 June 2016.

| Celebrity | Notability | Professional partner | Result |
|---|---|---|---|
| Iwan Thomas | Olympic sprinter & sports pundit | Ola Jordan | Eliminated 1st |
| Anthony Ogogo | Olympic boxer | Oti Mabuse | Eliminated 2nd |
| Daniel O'Donnell | Singer-songwriter | Kristina Rihanoff | Eliminated 3rd |
| Ainsley Harriott | Chef & Ready Steady Cook presenter | Natalie Lowe | Eliminated 4th |
| Kirsty Gallacher | Television presenter | Brendan Cole | Eliminated 5th |
| Carol Kirkwood | BBC Breakfast weather presenter | Pasha Kovalev | Eliminated 6th |
| Jeremy Vine | BBC Radio 2 presenter & journalist | Karen Clifton | Eliminated 7th |
| Jamelia | Singer & Loose Women panellist | Tristan MacManus | Eliminated 8th |
| Peter Andre | Singer & television personality | Janette Manrara | Eliminated 9th |
| Helen George | Call the Midwife actress | Aljaž Škorjanec | Eliminated 10th |
| Anita Rani | Television presenter | Gleb Savchenko | Eliminated 11th |
| Katie Derham | BBC Proms & BBC Radio 3 presenter | Anton Du Beke | Eliminated 12th |
| Georgia May Foote | Coronation Street actress | Giovanni Pernice | Runners-up |
| Kellie Bright | EastEnders actress | Kevin Clifton | Runners-up |
| Jay McGuiness | The Wanted singer | Aliona Vilani | Winners |

=== Series 14 (2016) ===
Strictly Come Dancing returned for its fourteenth series with a launch show on 3 September 2016 on BBC One. This was Len Goodman's final series as head judge.

On 28 June 2016, the list of professionals who were returning for the fourteenth series was revealed. Professionals from the last series who would not return included the previous series' champion and two-time professional winner of the show Aliona Vilani, former professional winner Ola Jordan and two-time professional finalist Kristina Rihanoff, as well as Gleb Savchenko and Tristan MacManus. Joanne Clifton returned after a one-series hiatus. The leaving professionals were replaced by Katya Jones, Burn the Floor dancer Gorka Márquez and former Dancing with the Stars US troupe member Oksana Platero. On 26 July 2016, three more new professional dancers (AJ Pritchard, Chloe Hewitt and Neil Jones, husband of new dancer Katya) were announced. Hewitt and Neil Jones did not partner a celebrity as the professionals outnumbered the celebrities, although they were still in group dances and appeared on It Takes Two.

| Celebrity | Notability | Professional partner | Result |
|---|---|---|---|
| Melvin Odoom | Television & radio presenter | Janette Manrara | Eliminated 1st |
| Tameka Empson | EastEnders actress | Gorka Márquez | Eliminated 2nd |
| Will Young | Singer-songwriter & actor | Karen Clifton | Withdrew |
| Naga Munchetty | BBC Breakfast newsreader & journalist | Pasha Kovalev | Eliminated 3rd |
| Lesley Joseph | Stage & screen actress | Anton Du Beke | Eliminated 4th |
| Anastacia | Singer-songwriter | Brendan Cole | Eliminated 5th |
| Laura Whitmore | Television presenter | Giovanni Pernice | Eliminated 6th |
| Daisy Lowe | Fashion model | Aljaž Škorjanec | Eliminated 7th |
| Greg Rutherford | Olympic long jumper | Natalie Lowe | Eliminated 8th |
| Ed Balls | Labour Party politician | Katya Jones | Eliminated 9th |
| Judge Rinder | Criminal law barrister & television judge | Oksana Platero | Eliminated 10th |
| Claudia Fragapane | Olympic artistic gymnast | AJ Pritchard | Eliminated 11th |
| Danny Mac | Hollyoaks actor | Oti Mabuse | Runners-up |
| Louise Redknapp | Eternal singer & television presenter | Kevin Clifton | Runners-up |
| Ore Oduba | BBC Sport presenter | Joanne Clifton | Winners |

=== Series 15 (2017) ===
On 4 May 2017, it was announced that series 7 finalist Natalie Lowe would be departing the show. Five days later, on 9 May, Shirley Ballas announced that she would be replacing Len Goodman as head judge. On 21 June 2017, Oksana Platero and the previous series' professional champion, Joanne Clifton, announced that they would also be leaving. The new professionals replacing them were Australian Open champion Dianne Buswell, Welsh dancer Amy Dowden, and Ukrainian two-time world champion Nadiya Bychkova. On 7 August, Nick Grimshaw announced that Mollie King was the first celebrity known to be taking part in the series. This was the first series to be broadcast since Sir Bruce Forsyth's death in August that year.

| Celebrity | Notability | Professional partner | Result |
|---|---|---|---|
| Chizzy Akudolu | Holby City actress & comedian | Pasha Kovalev | Eliminated 1st |
| Rev. Richard Coles | Broadcaster, musician & Church of England priest | Dianne Buswell | Eliminated 2nd |
| Charlotte Hawkins | Good Morning Britain presenter & journalist | Brendan Cole | Eliminated 3rd |
| Brian Conley | Comedian, singer & actor | Amy Dowden | Eliminated 4th |
| Simon Rimmer | Chef & Sunday Brunch presenter | Karen Clifton | Eliminated 5th |
| Aston Merrygold | JLS singer | Janette Manrara | Eliminated 6th |
| Ruth Langsford | Television presenter | Anton Du Beke | Eliminated 7th |
| Jonnie Peacock | Paralympic sprinter | Oti Mabuse | Eliminated 8th |
| Susan Calman | Stand-up comedian & television presenter | Kevin Clifton | Eliminated 9th |
| Davood Ghadami | EastEnders actor | Nadiya Bychkova | Eliminated 10th |
| Mollie King | The Saturdays singer | AJ Pritchard | Eliminated 11th |
| Alexandra Burke | Singer-songwriter | Gorka Márquez | Runners-up |
| Debbie McGee | Radio presenter & magician's assistant | Giovanni Pernice | Runners-up |
| Gemma Atkinson | Actress & model | Aljaž Škorjanec | Runners-up |
| Joe McFadden | Holby City actor | Katya Jones | Winners |

=== Series 16 (2018) ===
On 30 January 2018, it was announced that Brendan Cole would be leaving the show. On 30 May 2018, the full lineup of professional dancers was announced. Chloe Hewitt left the series and three new professional dancers ( Graziano Di Prima, Johannes Radebe and Luba Mushtuk) were announced to be joining the show. This meant that there were 18 professional dancers, the most in the show's history.

| Celebrity | Notability | Professional partner | Result |
|---|---|---|---|
| Susannah Constantine | Television presenter & fashion journalist | Anton Du Beke | Eliminated 1st |
| Lee Ryan | Blue singer & EastEnders actor | Nadiya Bychkova | Eliminated 2nd |
| Katie Piper | Philanthropist & television presenter | Gorka Márquez | Eliminated 3rd |
| Vick Hope | Capital FM presenter | Graziano Di Prima | Eliminated 4th |
| Seann Walsh | Stand-up comedian | Katya Jones | Eliminated 5th |
| Dr. Ranj Singh | This Morning presenter & author | Janette Manrara | Eliminated 6th |
| Danny John-Jules | Stage & screen actor | Amy Dowden | Eliminated 7th |
| Kate Silverton | BBC News presenter & journalist | Aljaž Škorjanec | Eliminated 8th |
| Graeme Swann | England cricketer | Oti Mabuse | Eliminated 9th |
| Charles Venn | Casualty actor | Karen Clifton | Eliminated 10th |
| Lauren Steadman | Paralympic swimmer & paratriathlete | AJ Pritchard | Eliminated 11th |
| Ashley Roberts | The Pussycat Dolls singer | Pasha Kovalev | Runners-up |
| Faye Tozer | Steps singer | Giovanni Pernice | Runners-up |
| Joe Sugg | YouTube personality | Dianne Buswell | Runners-up |
| Stacey Dooley | Investigative journalist | Kevin Clifton | Winners |

=== Series 17 (2019) ===
On 13 February 2019, professional dancer Pasha Kovalev announced that he was leaving the show after competing on it for eight years. On 10 April 2019, it was announced that judge Darcey Bussell had left the show after seven years. On 22 July 2019, Motsi Mabuse was announced as the replacement for Bussell. On 30 July 2019, it was announced that Nancy Xu would be joining the cast of professional dancers. On 5 September 2019, it was announced that Jamie Laing had withdrawn from the show due to a foot injury. He was later replaced by Kelvin Fletcher. In late October, Will Bayley left the competition due to a sustained leg injury.

| Celebrity | Notability | Professional partner | Result |
|---|---|---|---|
| James Cracknell | Olympic rower | Luba Mushtuk | Eliminated 1st |
| Anneka Rice | Television & radio presenter | Kevin Clifton | Eliminated 2nd |
| Dev Griffin | BBC Radio 1 presenter | Dianne Buswell | Eliminated 3rd |
| David James | England goalkeeper | Nadiya Bychkova | Eliminated 4th |
| Catherine Tyldesley | Coronation Street actress | Johannes Radebe | Eliminated 5th |
| Will Bayley | Paralympic table tennis player | Janette Manrara | Withdrew |
| Emma Weymouth | Fashion model & socialite | Aljaž Škorjanec | Eliminated 6th |
| Mike Bushell | BBC Breakfast sports presenter | Katya Jones | Eliminated 7th |
| Michelle Visage | RuPaul's Drag Race judge & singer | Giovanni Pernice | Eliminated 8th |
| Saffron Barker | YouTube personality | AJ Pritchard | Eliminated 9th |
| Alex Scott | England footballer | Neil Jones | Eliminated 10th |
| Chris Ramsey | Stand-up comedian | Karen Hauer | Eliminated 11th |
| Emma Barton | EastEnders actress | Anton Du Beke | Runners-up |
| Karim Zeroual | CBBC presenter & actor | Amy Dowden | Runners-up |
| Kelvin Fletcher | Emmerdale actor & racing driver | Oti Mabuse | Winners |

=== Series 18 (2020) ===
On 6 March 2020, Kevin Clifton announced that he was leaving the show after seven years. On 26 March 2020, AJ Pritchard also announced that he was leaving the show after four years. Due to the COVID-19 pandemic, it was confirmed that the series would be slightly shorter than planned. Before the series began, the professional dancers and some of the crew isolated and tested for COVID-19 to then become a household. Strictly took over a hotel near the studios and the pro dancers learnt and filmed all the group routines for the series at once. This allowed for the show to still include the professional group dances each week. On 21 August 2020, it was announced that Bruno Tonioli would not be on the judging panel but would appear virtually while he filmed Dancing with the Stars in the US. It was the first series since 2012 to begin in October. On 12 November 2020, Nicola Adams and Katya Jones were forced to withdraw from the competition after Jones tested positive for COVID-19. On 19 December 2020, Bill Bailey and Oti Mabuse were announced as the winners of the series, making Mabuse the second professional dancer to win the show twice and the first to win it consecutively, following her 2019 victory. This series featured the first all-female and same-sex partnership of Nicola Adams and Katya Jones.

| Celebrity | Notability | Professional partner | Result |
|---|---|---|---|
| Jacqui Smith | Labour Party politician | Anton Du Beke | Eliminated 1st |
| Jason Bell | NFL player & pundit | Luba Mushtuk | Eliminated 2nd |
| Nicola Adams | Olympic boxer | Katya Jones | Withdrew |
| Max George | The Wanted singer | Dianne Buswell | Eliminated 3rd |
| Caroline Quentin | Actress & television presenter | Johannes Radebe | Eliminated 4th |
| Clara Amfo | BBC Radio 1 presenter | Aljaž Škorjanec | Eliminated 5th |
| JJ Chalmers | Television presenter & Invictus Games medallist | Amy Dowden | Eliminated 6th |
| Ranvir Singh | Good Morning Britain presenter & journalist | Giovanni Pernice | Eliminated 7th |
| HRVY | Singer & television presenter | Janette Manrara | Runners-up |
| Jamie Laing | Made in Chelsea star | Karen Hauer | Runners-up |
| Maisie Smith | EastEnders actress | Gorka Márquez | Runners-up |
| Bill Bailey | Comedian, musician & actor | Oti Mabuse | Winners |

=== Series 19 (2021) ===
On 10 June 2021, it was announced that Janette Manrara would leave the show as a professional dancer and replace Zoe Ball as a new It Takes Two presenter. On 24 June, Anton Du Beke was announced as having joined the judging panel for this series instead of returning as a professional dancer, replacing Bruno Tonioli, who missed a second year due to continuing travel restrictions imposed by the COVID-19 pandemic. In addition to the remaining fourteen professional dancers from series 18, all of whom returned for this series, four new professional dancers joined the show: Cameron Lombard, Jowita Przystał, Kai Widdrington and Nikita Kuzmin.

This series marked the first time that two contestants withdrew from the competition. On 13 October 2021, Robert Webb withdrew from the competition for health reasons. On 17 December 2021, AJ Odudu was forced to withdraw from the final after tearing a ligament in her right ankle.

The series saw the first couple with a deaf contestant, actress Rose Ayling-Ellis and the first all-male partnership of John Whaite and Johannes Radebe.

| Celebrity | Notability | Professional partner | Result |
|---|---|---|---|
| Nina Wadia | Stage & screen actress | Neil Jones | Eliminated 1st |
| Katie McGlynn | Coronation Street actress | Gorka Márquez | Eliminated 2nd |
| Robert Webb | Comedian & actor | Dianne Buswell | Withdrew |
| Greg Wise | Film & television actor | Karen Hauer | Eliminated 3rd |
| Ugo Monye | England rugby player & pundit | Oti Mabuse | Eliminated 4th |
| Judi Love | Comedian & Loose Women panellist | Graziano Di Prima | Eliminated 5th |
| Adam Peaty | Olympic swimmer | Katya Jones | Eliminated 6th |
| Sara Davies | Dragons' Den investor & businesswoman | Aljaž Škorjanec | Eliminated 7th |
| Tom Fletcher | McFly singer | Amy Dowden | Eliminated 8th |
| Tilly Ramsay | Chef & television presenter | Nikita Kuzmin | Eliminated 9th |
| Dan Walker | BBC Breakfast presenter & journalist | Nadiya Bychkova | Eliminated 10th |
| Rhys Stephenson | CBBC presenter | Nancy Xu | Eliminated 11th |
| AJ Odudu | Television presenter | Kai Widdrington | Withdrew |
| John Whaite | Baker & television presenter | Johannes Radebe | Runners-up |
| Rose Ayling-Ellis | EastEnders actress | Giovanni Pernice | Winners |

=== Series 20 (2022) ===
The twentieth series began in September 2022. New professionals joining the show were Vito Coppola, Carlos Gu, Michelle Tsiakkas, and Lauren Oakley. They replaced professional Janette Manrara, who had moved to become co-presenter of Strictly Come Dancing: It Takes Two following the departure of Rylan Clark, and professional Anton Du Beke who had become a full-time permanent Strictly Judge, following Tonioli's departure.

| Celebrity | Notability | Professional partner | Result |
|---|---|---|---|
| Kaye Adams | Loose Women panellist & journalist | Kai Widdrington | Eliminated 1st |
| Richie Anderson | Television & radio presenter | Giovanni Pernice | Eliminated 2nd |
| Matt Goss | Singer-songwriter | Nadiya Bychkova | Eliminated 3rd |
| Jayde Adams | Comedian & actress | Karen Hauer | Eliminated 4th |
| James Bye | EastEnders actor | Amy Dowden | Eliminated 5th |
| Ellie Simmonds | Paralympic swimmer | Nikita Kuzmin | Eliminated 6th |
| Tony Adams | England footballer & manager | Katya Jones | Withdrew |
| Tyler West | Kiss FM presenter | Dianne Buswell | Eliminated 7th |
| Ellie Taylor | Comedian, actress & television presenter | Johannes Radebe | Eliminated 8th |
| Kym Marsh | Actress, singer & Morning Live presenter | Graziano Di Prima | Eliminated 9th |
| Will Mellor | Stage & screen actor | Nancy Xu | Eliminated 10th |
| Fleur East | Singer-songwriter & radio presenter | Vito Coppola | Runners-up |
| Helen Skelton | Television presenter | Gorka Márquez | Runners-up |
| Molly Rainford | Nova Jones actress & singer | Carlos Gu | Runners-up |
| Hamza Yassin | Wildlife presenter & cameraman | Jowita Przystał | Winners |

=== Series 21 (2023) ===
The twenty-first series began in September 2023.

In April 2023, Rylan Clark announced that he was leaving as co-host of It Takes Two. Fleur East, who was one of the finalists in series 20, was later announced as his replacement.

| Celebrity | Notability | Professional partner | Result |
|---|---|---|---|
| Les Dennis | Comedian, actor & television presenter | Nancy Xu | Eliminated 1st |
| Nikita Kanda | BBC Asian Network presenter | Gorka Márquez | Eliminated 2nd |
| Jody Cundy | Paralympic cyclist & swimmer | Jowita Przystał | Eliminated 3rd |
| Eddie Kadi | Comedian & BBC Radio 1Xtra presenter | Karen Hauer | Eliminated 4th |
| Amanda Abbington | Stage & screen actress | Giovanni Pernice | Withdrew |
| Zara McDermott | Media personality & television presenter | Graziano Di Prima | Eliminated 5th |
| Adam Thomas | Waterloo Road & Emmerdale actor | Luba Mushtuk | Eliminated 6th |
| Krishnan Guru-Murthy | Channel 4 News presenter & journalist | Lauren Oakley | Eliminated 7th |
| Angela Rippon | Television presenter, journalist & newsreader | Kai Widdrington | Eliminated 8th |
| Angela Scanlon | Television presenter | Carlos Gu | Eliminated 9th |
| Nigel Harman | Stage & screen actor | Katya Jones | Withdrew |
| Annabel Croft | Professional tennis player & pundit | Johannes Radebe | Eliminated 10th |
| Bobby Brazier | EastEnders actor & model | Dianne Buswell | Runners-up |
| Layton Williams | Bad Education actor & West End performer | Nikita Kuzmin | Runners-up |
| Ellie Leach | Coronation Street actress | Vito Coppola | Winners |

=== Series 22 (2024) ===
The twenty-second series began in September 2024. Aljaž Škorjanec returned to the series as a professional dancer, following a two year break from the show. He was paired with Love Island star and model Tasha Ghouri and the pair reached the final, finishing as runners-up.

| Celebrity | Notability | Professional partner | Status |
|---|---|---|---|
| Tom Dean | Olympic swimmer | Nadiya Bychkova | Eliminated 1st |
| Toyah Willcox | Singer, actress & television presenter | Neil Jones | Eliminated 2nd |
| Nick Knowles | Television presenter | Luba Mushtuk | Eliminated 3rd |
| Paul Merson | England footballer & pundit | Karen Hauer | Eliminated 4th |
| Dr. Punam Krishan | Morning Live doctor & author | Gorka Márquez | Eliminated 5th |
| Sam Quek | Olympic field hockey player & television presenter | Nikita Kuzmin | Eliminated 6th |
| Shayne Ward | Singer & actor | Nancy Xu | Eliminated 7th |
| Wynne Evans | Opera singer & BBC Radio Wales presenter | Katya Jones | Eliminated 8th |
| Jamie Borthwick | EastEnders actor | Michelle Tsiakkas | Eliminated 9th |
| Montell Douglas | Olympic sprinter, bobsledder & Gladiators star | Johannes Radebe | Eliminated 10th |
| Pete Wicks | Television personality | Jowita Przystał | Eliminated 11th |
| Tasha Ghouri | Love Island finalist & model | Aljaž Škorjanec | Runners-up |
| JB Gill | JLS singer & television presenter | Amy Dowden (weeks 1–6); Lauren Oakley (weeks 7–13) | Runners-up |
| Sarah Hadland | Stage & screen actress | Vito Coppola | Runners-up |
| Chris McCausland | Stand-up comedian & actor | Dianne Buswell | Winners |

=== Series 23 (2025) ===
The twenty-third series began on 20 September 2025. Two new professional dancers joined the series, with Julian Caillon being paired with actress Balvinder Sopal where they reached the semi-final, and Alexis Warr being paired with social media star George Clarke where they reached the final.

| Celebrity | Notability | Professional partner | Status |
|---|---|---|---|
| Thomas Skinner | The Apprentice contestant & businessman | Amy Dowden | Eliminated 1st |
| Ross King | Television presenter & actor | Jowita Przystał | Eliminated 2nd |
| Chris Robshaw | Former England rugby player | Nadiya Bychkova | Eliminated 3rd |
| Stefan Dennis | Neighbours actor & singer | Dianne Buswell | Withdrew |
| Jimmy Floyd Hasselbaink | Former Netherlands footballer & manager | Lauren Oakley | Eliminated 4th |
| Ellie Goldstein | Model & Malory Towers actress | Vito Coppola | Eliminated 5th |
| Harry Aikines-Aryeetey | Former Olympic sprinter & Gladiators star | Karen Hauer | Eliminated 6th |
| Vicky Pattison | Television personality | Kai Widdrington | Eliminated 7th |
| La Voix | Drag queen & RuPaul's Drag Race UK finalist | Aljaž Škorjanec | Withdrew |
| Alex Kingston | Stage & screen actress | Johannes Radebe | Eliminated 8th |
| Lewis Cope | Former Emmerdale actor | Katya Jones | Eliminated 9th |
| Balvinder Sopal | EastEnders actress | Julian Caillon | Eliminated 10th |
| Amber Davies | Love Island winner & stage actress | Nikita Kuzmin | Runners-up |
| George Clarke | Social media personality & podcaster | Alexis Warr | Runners-up |
| Karen Carney | Former England footballer & pundit | Carlos Gu | Winners |

=== Series 24 (2026) ===
The twenty-fourth series began on 19 September 2026. Five new professional dancers joined the series alongside new hosts Emma Willis, Josh Widdicombe and professional dancer Johannes Radebe.

=== Specials ===
Since the inception of Strictly Come Dancing in 2004, several special editions of the show have been transmitted by the BBC each year. These have included seasonal specials, charity specials, and variations of the Strictly Come Dancing format.

== Strictly Come Dancing Live! ==
Strictly Come Dancing Live! is a nationwide arena tour staged every year since 2008.

== Controversies ==
=== 2008 voting system ===
On 13 December 2008, Strictly Come Dancing became the subject of press attention and viewer complaints about an error in the voting system during the semi-final of series six. In the show, three couples remained in the competition. After all three had performed and the judges had given their scores, two of the couples were in joint-first position on the leaderboard, with Tom Chambers and Camilla Dallerup in last place. This meant that, no matter how many public votes were cast in their favour, it was mathematically impossible for Chambers and Dallerup to avoid the dance-off. This oversight was initially unnoticed by producers until after the public vote became live and viewers were invited to call in and save their favourites at a cost of 15p per vote. Once the mistake was finally realised and the public vote was closed, it was announced that all three couples would be put through to the final, all the votes already cast would count towards the final result of the competition, and viewers could apply for a refund if they wished.

The BBC received 1800 complaints about the incident, while media regulator Ofcom received 297. Jon Beazley, the BBC's Head of Entertainment Production, was interviewed on Strictly's spin-off show Strictly Come Dancing: It Takes Two on 15 December. He apologised for the oversight, referring to it as an "unprecedented situation". On the same day, the BBC posted a statement on its website, which clarified that an independent adjudicator had been consulted to reach a solution that would offer "fairness to the viewers who voted and the contestants themselves". The BBC also stated that, following the mistake, "the voting and judging mechanisms used in all BBC voting programmes [had] been thoroughly examined".

After conducting an investigation, Ofcom concluded that "the mistake had resulted from an oversight, rather than any shortcomings in the technical arrangements for voting or in the handling of votes received", and that they were "satisfied that appropriate steps were taken by the BBC and the disadvantage to viewers minimised". Ofcom also opined that "the BBC had been open and transparent with viewers about the mistake it made and the solution adopted".

=== Dismissal of Arlene Phillips ===
In June 2009, tabloid newspaper The Sun reported that the then 66-year-old judge Arlene Phillips, who had judged the show since its inception in 2004, was to be replaced by series five winner Alesha Dixon, then aged 30. This was later confirmed by the BBC in July of that year. Subsequently, the BBC was accused of ageism and sexism by several sources, an accusation the corporation has faced before over the removal of several older female presenters, including Moira Stuart, Juliet Morris, Miriam O'Reilly, Michaela Strachan, Charlotte Smith and Anna Ford. The BBC denied the allegations that the decision to remove Phillips was due to her age.

Furthermore, Dixon herself was criticised after the debut episode of the seventh series, the first to feature her as a judge. A total of 272 complaints were received by the BBC (bringing the total number about Dixon joining the programme to over 4,000) along with over 5,000 comments on Strictly Come Dancing's internet message board. Dixon was compared unfavourably to Phillips, with claims that the former was "unsuitable", "unqualified" and lacked "knowledge, experience and talent". However, Dixon was praised and defended from her critics by the BBC, by fellow judge Craig Revel Horwood and by Phillips herself.

=== Same-sex couples ===
In 2015, in an interview with the Daily Mirror, Egghead C. J. de Mooi said that he was rejected by the show because he had wanted to dance with a same-sex partner. The BBC denied that de Mooi had ever been under consideration for the show, and also declared that "Strictly is a family show and we have chosen the traditional format of mixed-sex couples". The press has reported on the issue on numerous occasions when gay celebrities have appeared on the show, including Will Young, Susan Calman, Robert Rinder, Richard Coles and Ranj Singh. Strictly Come Dancing judges Shirley Ballas and Craig Revel Horwood have both expressed their support for introducing same-sex couples.

Same-sex partnerships have been featured on several international versions of the show, including Italy (2018), Australia (2019) and Denmark (2019). On 3 November 2019, Johannes Radebe and fellow professional Graziano Di Prima performed together to Emeli Sandé's "Shine" on the Sunday results episode, the show's first individual same-sex dance. On 2 September 2020, it was announced that boxer Nicola Adams would feature in the show's first same-sex couple for its eighteenth series. She was partnered with professional dancer Katya Jones. In 2021, it was announced that John Whaite would feature in the first all-male same-sex couple with Johannes Radebe for the nineteenth series, with the two of them eventually finishing as the runners-up.

The American version of the show had a same-sex couple that same year, with JoJo Siwa and Jenna Johnson. Series 20 included same-sex partnerships with Richie Anderson and Giovanni Pernice in an all-male partnership and Jayde Adams and Karen Hauer in an all-female partnership. In Series 21, Layton Williams and Nikita Kuzmin competed as an all-male partnership, finishing as one of the two runners-up couples.

=== 2025 police investigations ===
In August and October 2025, it was reported that two unnamed male stars of the series were arrested on suspicion of rape. The reports indicated that neither individual was due to be involved in the 2025 series. This followed a Metropolitan Police investigation into alleged drug use by two stars of the series in August 2025.

=== Thomas Skinner ===
For the twenty-third series (2025), former The Apprentice contestant Thomas Skinner's participation as a celebrity dancer was deemed controversial due to his association with US Vice President JD Vance and the wider Make America Great Again movement. At a press event to promote the series, Skinner left early, which he attributed to having seen a message relating to a "personal story" from his past on a reporter's phone. Director General of the BBC Tim Davie defended Skinner's casting.

After becoming the first contestant to be eliminated from the series, Skinner claimed to be in possession of an email detailing that the result against him had been rigged, and that the BBC were "angry" and "nervous" over his meeting with Vance. In response to the allegation, the BBC affirmed that the vote was "independently overseen and verified to ensure complete accuracy", with auditors PromoVeritas also stating that they had not found any issues with the public vote. While he reportedly planned to sue the BBC over the matter, Skinner declined to attend the series' final with the other eliminated celebrities.

=== Misconduct of dancers and celebrities ===
==== Anton Du Beke ====
In 2009, during the seventh series, professional dancer Anton Du Beke issued a public apology for his use of a racial slur during a conversation with his dance partner Laila Rouass. Rouass accepted his apology and said that he should "[a]bsolutely not" be fired: "Anton has apologised and I've accepted it. This happened a couple of weeks ago now and we are just having a really good time. We just want to move on from it." In 2016, she backed him to be a Strictly judge.

Over 600 complaints were received by the BBC, including those about comments made by Bruce Forsyth, then host of Strictly Come Dancing, on a Talksport radio programme. Forsyth suggested that Britain "used to have a sense of humour" about such incidents, and that Du Beke's apology should be accepted.

Following the incident, and Forsyth's response, the BBC stated:

Racially offensive language in the workplace is entirely unacceptable. Anton was right to apologise quickly and without reservation and Laila has wholly accepted his apology. Everyone is very clear that there can be no repetition of this behaviour.

Forsyth also clarified his position:

What Anton said to Laila was wrong and he has apologised unreservedly for this. Nor do I in any way excuse or condone the use of such language. To be absolutely clear, the use of racially offensive language is never either funny or acceptable. However, there is a major difference between this and racist comments which are malicious in intent and whilst I accept that we live in a world of extraordinary political correctness, we should keep things in perspective.

==== Giovanni Pernice ====
In January 2024, The Sun reported that Amanda Abbington requested footage of her time training with Giovanni Pernice and was seeking legal advice over his training methods. In March 2024, The Sun said that Abbington, Laura Whitmore and Ranvir Singh had met to discuss their negative experiences with Pernice on the show. Legal firm Carter Ruck told BBC News there were "numerous serious complaints" about his behaviour while filming Strictly Come Dancing. On 16 May, it was reported by The Sun that Pernice had quit the show. Pernice denied all accusations of wrongdoing. His departure was confirmed by the BBC on 10 June.

==== Graziano Di Prima ====
In July 2024, the BBC's probe into misconduct brought further claims made by production staff, who observed Graziano Di Prima's behaviour towards dance partner Zara McDermott during the 2023 series. A source speaking to The Sun claimed that footage showing Di Prima's alleged treatment of McDermott "reduced those who have seen it to tears". In a statement Di Prima said that he "deeply regretted his actions that led to his departure from [the show]". The BBC has announced that Di Prima has left the show, and in the future a member of the production team would be present at all times during rehearsals.

A third professional dancer has been identified as a "person of interest".

==== Wynne Evans ====
In 2024, Wynne Evans became embroiled in controversy after allegedly making a sexualized remark about dancer Janette Manrara during a Strictly live tour photocall, which was reported by the press and led to public backlash and accusations of misogyny. Evans denied the remark was sexual or directed at Manrara, explaining it was an inside joke nickname for fellow contestant Jamie Borthwick, but nonetheless issued an apology and agreed to resign from his BBC radio show and the tour to focus on his wellbeing. The scandal was compounded by a separate incident involving a TikTok "body language experiment" with dance partner Katya Jones, which was misinterpreted and also prompted an apology. Throughout, Evans maintained that his actions were misunderstood and expressed regret over the effect on his reputation.

==== Jamie Borthwick ====
In June 2025, Jamie Borthwick was suspended from EastEnders by the BBC after a backstage video from Strictly Come Dancing in November 2024, surfaced showing him referring to the inhabitants of Blackpool by using ableist language considered derogatory toward disabled individuals. The BBC described his language as "entirely unacceptable" and said it did not reflect their values or standards. He issued a public apology in a statement to The Sun on Sunday, expressing regret for his words and acknowledging the offence they had caused. In September 2025, it was announced that Borthwick had been axed from EastEnders after 19 years, and would not return from his suspension.

== Ratings ==
An example of Strictly Come Dancing's popularity is that, after episodes, electricity use in the United Kingdom rises significantly as viewers who have waited for the show to end begin boiling water for tea, a phenomenon known as TV pick-up. National Grid personnel watch the show to know when closing credits begin so they can prepare for the surge.

All ratings are from BARB. Series averages exclude Christmas special and launch show.

| Series | Series premiere | Series finale | Average UK viewers (in millions) |
|---|---|---|---|
| 1 | 15 May 2004 | 3 July 2004 | 6.45 |
| 2 | 23 October 2004 | 11 December 2004 | 8.61 |
| 3 | 15 October 2005 | 17 December 2005 | 8.37 |
| 4 | 7 October 2006 | 23 December 2006 | 8.55 |
| 5 | 6 October 2007 | 22 December 2007 | 9.05 |
| 6 | 20 September 2008 | 20 December 2008 | 9.64 |
| 7 | 18 September 2009 | 19 December 2009 | 9.22 |
| 8 | 1 October 2010 | 18 December 2010 | 11.07 |
| 9 | 30 September 2011 | 17 December 2011 | 10.98 |
| 10 | 5 October 2012 | 22 December 2012 | 10.80 |
| 11 | 27 September 2013 | 21 December 2013 | 10.71 |
| 12 | 26 September 2014 | 20 December 2014 | 10.25 |
| 13 | 25 September 2015 | 19 December 2015 | 10.63 |
| 14 | 23 September 2016 | 17 December 2016 | 10.96 |
| 15 | 23 September 2017 | 16 December 2017 | 11.14 |
| 16 | 22 September 2018 | 15 December 2018 | 10.59 |
| 17 | 21 September 2019 | 14 December 2019 | 10.42 |
| 18 | 24 October 2020 | 19 December 2020 | 10.77 |
| 19 | 25 September 2021 | 18 December 2021 | 9.72 |
| 20 | 24 September 2022 | 17 December 2022 | 9.09 |
| 21 | 23 September 2023 | 16 December 2023 | 8.55 |
| 22 | 21 September 2024 | 14 December 2024 | 8.21 |
| 23 | 27 September 2025 | 20 December 2025 | 7.40 |

== Awards ==
The show has won a Rose d'Or award for "Best Variety Show", competition from reality shows from twelve other different countries. It has also won two awards for "Best Reality Show" at the TRIC Awards and two at the TV Quick Awards for "Best Talent Show". It has also received four BAFTA Award nominations.

The show won the award of "Most Popular Talent Show" at the National Television Awards in 2008, 2013, 2014, 2016, 2017, 2018, 2019, 2020, 2021, 2022, 2023 and 2024.

In the Guinness World Records 2010 edition, the format of Strictly Come Dancing was named the most successful television show with the format being sold to more than 38 countries worldwide.

| Year | Award | Category | Nominee | Result | Ref. |
|---|---|---|---|---|---|
| 2004 | National Television Awards | Most Popular Entertainment Programme | Strictly Come Dancing | Nominated | |
| 2005 | British Academy Television Awards | Best Entertainment Programme | Karen Smith, Richard Hopkins, Izzie Pick | Nominated | |
| 2005 | British Academy Television Craft Awards | Best Costume Design | Su Judd | Nominated | |
| 2005 | Royal Television Society Programme Awards | Entertainment | Strictly Come Dancing | Won | |
| 2005 | National Television Awards | Most Popular Entertainment Programme | Strictly Come Dancing | Nominated | |
| 2005 | TRIC Awards | Entertainment Programme | Strictly Come Dancing | Won | |
| 2005 | Rose d'Or | Variety | Strictly Come Dancing | Won | |
| 2006 | British Academy Television Awards | Best Entertainment Programme | Karen Smith, Richard Hopkins, Sam Donnelly | Nominated | |
| 2006 | National Television Awards | Most Popular Entertainment Programme | Strictly Come Dancing | Nominated | |
| 2006 | TRIC Awards | Entertainment Programme | Strictly Come Dancing | Nominated | |
| 2007 | British Academy Television Craft Awards | Best Sound: Fiction/Entertainment | Gary Clarke | Nominated | |
| 2007 | Royal Television Society Craft & Design Awards | Sound – Entertainment & Non-Drama Productions | BBC Studios Sound Team | Nominated | |
| 2007 | National Television Awards | Most Popular Talent Show | Strictly Come Dancing | Nominated | |
| 2007 | TRIC Awards | Reality Programme | Strictly Come Dancing | Won | |
| 2008 | British Academy Television Awards | Best Entertainment Programme | Martin Scott, Sam Donnelly, Clodagh O'Donoghue | Nominated | |
| 2008 | British Academy Television Awards | Audience Award | Strictly Come Dancing | Nominated | |
| 2008 | Royal Television Society Programme Awards | Entertainment | Strictly Come Dancing | Nominated | |
| 2008 | National Television Awards | Most Popular Talent Show | Strictly Come Dancing | Won | |
| 2008 | TRIC Awards | Reality Programme | Strictly Come Dancing | Won | |
| 2009 | Royal Television Society Programme Awards | Entertainment | Strictly Come Dancing | Nominated | |
| 2009 | TRIC Awards | Reality Programme | Strictly Come Dancing | Won | |
| 2010 | National Television Awards | Most Popular Talent Show | Strictly Come Dancing | Nominated | |
| 2010 | TRIC Awards | Reality Programme | Strictly Come Dancing | Won | |
| 2011 | British Academy Television Craft Awards | Best Director: Multi-Camera | Nikki Parsons | Nominated | |
| 2011 | British Academy Television Craft Awards | Best Entertainment Craft Team | Su Judd, Patrick Doherty, Mark Kenyon, Lisa Armstrong | Nominated | |
| 2011 | Royal Television Society Craft & Design Awards | Lighting For Multicamera | Mark Kenyon (for "Halloween Special") | Nominated | |
| 2011 | Royal Television Society Craft & Design Awards | Make Up Design – Entertainment & Non Drama Productions | Lisa Armstrong (for "Halloween Special") | Nominated | |
| 2011 | Royal Television Society Craft & Design Awards | Sound – Entertainment & Non Drama | Tony Revell, Andy Tapley, Howard Hopkins (for "Halloween Special") | Nominated | |
| 2011 | National Television Awards | Most Popular Talent Show | Strictly Come Dancing | Nominated | |
| 2011 | TRIC Awards | Reality Programme | Strictly Come Dancing | Won | |
| 2012 | Royal Television Society Craft & Design Awards | Costume Design – Entertainment & Non Drama Productions | Vicky Gill | Nominated | |
| 2012 | National Television Awards | Most Popular Talent Show | Strictly Come Dancing | Nominated | |
| 2012 | TRIC Awards | Reality Programme | Strictly Come Dancing | Won | |
| 2013 | British Academy Television Awards | Radio Times Audience Award | Strictly Come Dancing | Nominated | |
| 2013 | British Academy Television Craft Awards | Best Director: Multi-Camera | Nikki Parsons | Nominated | |
| 2013 | Royal Television Society Craft & Design Awards | Costume Design – Entertainment & Non Drama | Vicky Gill | Nominated | |
| 2013 | National Television Awards | Most Popular Talent Show | Strictly Come Dancing | Won | |
| 2013 | TRIC Awards | Reality Programme | Strictly Come Dancing | Won | |
| 2014 | British Academy Television Awards | Best Entertainment Programme | Strictly Come Dancing | Nominated | |
| 2014 | British Academy Television Craft Awards | Best Director: Multi-Camera | Nikki Parsons | Nominated | |
| 2014 | British Academy Television Craft Awards | Special Awards | Strictly Come Dancing | Won | |
| 2014 | Royal Television Society Craft & Design Awards | Costume Design – Entertainment & Non Drama | Vicky Gill | Nominated | |
| 2014 | Royal Television Society Craft & Design Awards | Multicamera Work | Nikki Parsons and Camera Team | Nominated | |
| 2014 | Royal Television Society Craft & Design Awards | Make Up Design – Entertainment & Non Drama | Lisa Armstrong | Won | |
| 2014 | Royal Television Society Craft & Design Awards | Production Design – Entertainment & Non Drama | Patrick Doherty | Nominated | |
| 2014 | National Television Awards | Talent Show | Strictly Come Dancing | Won | |
| 2014 | Broadcasting Press Guild Awards | Best Comedy/Entertainment | Strictly Come Dancing | Won | |
| 2014 | TRIC Awards | Reality Programme | Strictly Come Dancing | Won | |
| 2015 | British Academy Television Awards | Best Entertainment Programme | Louise Rainbow, Nikki Parsons, Vanessa Clark, Jason Gilkison | Nominated | |
| 2015 | British Academy Television Awards | Radio Times Audience Award | Strictly Come Dancing | Nominated | |
| 2015 | British Academy Television Awards | Best Entertainment Performance | Claudia Winkleman | Nominated | |
| 2015 | British Academy Television Craft Awards | Best Make Up and Hair Design | Lisa Armstrong, Neale Pirie | Nominated | |
| 2015 | British Academy Television Craft Awards | Best Costume Design | Vicky Gill | Nominated | |
| 2015 | British Academy Television Craft Awards | Best Entertainment Craft Team | Lisa Armstrong, Patrick Doherty, Vicky Gill, Tony Revell | Nominated | |
| 2015 | Royal Television Society Programme Awards | Entertainment Performance | Claudia Winkleman | Won | |
| 2015 | Royal Television Society Craft & Design Awards | Costume Design – Entertainment & Non Drama Productions | Vicky Gill | Won | |
| 2015 | Royal Television Society Craft & Design Awards | Make Up Design – Entertainment & Non Drama Productions | Lisa Armstrong, Neale Pirie | Nominated | |
| 2015 | National Television Awards | Talent Show | Strictly Come Dancing | Nominated | |
| 2015 | TRIC Awards | Reality Programme | Strictly Come Dancing | Won | |
| 2016 | British Academy Television Awards | Best Entertainment Programme | Louise Rainbow, Vinnie Shergill, Sarah James, Nikki Parsons | Won | |
| 2016 | British Academy Television Craft Awards | Best Entertainment Craft Team | Jason Gilkison, Mark Kenyon, Tony Revell, Dave Newton | Nominated | |
| 2016 | Royal Television Society Craft & Design Awards | Multicamera Work | Camera Team, Nikki Parsons | Nominated | |
| 2016 | Royal Television Society Craft & Design Awards | Production Design – Entertainment & Non Drama | Patrick Doherty | Nominated | |
| 2016 | Royal Television Society Craft & Design Awards | Sound – Entertainment & Non Drama | Tony Revell | Nominated | |
| 2016 | National Television Awards | Talent Show | Strictly Come Dancing | Won | |
| 2016 | TRIC Awards | Reality Programme | Strictly Come Dancing | Won | |
| 2017 | British Academy Television Awards | Best Entertainment Programme | Strictly Come Dancing | Won | |
| 2017 | British Academy Television Awards | Best Entertainment Performance | Claudia Winkleman | Nominated | |
| 2017 | British Academy Television Awards | Virgin TV's Must-See Moment | "Ed Balls' Gangnam Style" | Nominated | |
| 2017 | British Academy Television Craft Awards | Best Director: Multi-Camera | Nikki Parsons | Nominated | |
| 2017 | British Academy Television Craft Awards | Best Entertainment Craft Team | David Newton, Mark Kenyon, Jason Gilkison, Vicky Gill | Nominated | |
| 2017 | Royal Television Society Programme Awards | Entertainment | Strictly Come Dancing | Nominated | |
| 2017 | Royal Television Society Craft & Design Awards | Costume Design – Entertainment and Non Drama | Vicky Gill & The Costume Team | Nominated | |
| 2017 | Royal Television Society Craft & Design Awards | Multicamera Work | Camera Team, Nikki Parsons | Nominated | |
| 2017 | National Television Awards | TV Judge | Len Goodman | Nominated | |
| 2017 | National Television Awards | Talent Show | Strictly Come Dancing | Won | |
| 2017 | Broadcasting Press Guild Awards | Best Entertainment | Strictly Come Dancing | Nominated | |
| 2017 | TRIC Awards | Reality Programme | Strictly Come Dancing | Won | |
| 2018 | British Academy Television Craft Awards | Best Director: Multi-Camera | Nikki Parsons | Nominated | |
| 2018 | British Academy Television Craft Awards | Best Entertainment Craft Team | Jason Gilkison, Mark Kenyon, Patrick Doherty, David Newton | Nominated | |
| 2018 | Royal Television Society Programme Awards | Entertainment Performance | Claudia Winkleman | Nominated | |
| 2018 | Royal Television Society Craft & Design Awards | Director – Multicamera | Nikki Parsons | Won | |
| 2018 | National Television Awards | Talent Show | Strictly Come Dancing | Won | |
| 2018 | Broadcasting Press Guild Awards | Best Entertainment | Strictly Come Dancing | Nominated | |
| 2018 | TRIC Awards | Reality Programme | Strictly Come Dancing | Nominated | |
| 2019 | British Academy Television Awards | Best Entertainment Programme | Louise Rainbow, Sarah James, Robin Lee-Perrella, Jason Gilkison | Nominated | |
| 2019 | British Academy Television Craft Awards | Best Entertainment Craft Team | Lisa Armstrong, Jason Gilkinson, Mark Kenyon | Nominated | |
| 2019 | Royal Television Society Craft & Design Awards | Costume Design – Entertainment & Non Drama | Vicky Gill | Nominated | |
| 2019 | Royal Television Society Craft & Design Awards | Make Up Design – Entertainment & Non Drama | Lisa Armstrong | Won | |
| 2019 | National Television Awards | Talent Show | Strictly Come Dancing | Won | |
| 2019 | Broadcasting Press Guild Awards | Best Entertainment | Strictly Come Dancing | Nominated | |
| 2019 | TRIC Awards | Reality Programme | Strictly Come Dancing | Won | |
| 2020 | British Academy Television Awards | Best Entertainment Programme | Strictly Come Dancing | Won | |
| 2020 | British Academy Television Craft Awards | Best Entertainment Craft Team | David Bishop, Patrick Doherty, Vicky Gill and Andy Tapley | Won | |
| 2020 | Royal Television Society Craft & Design Awards | Production Design – Entertainment & Non Drama | Catherine Land, Patrick Doherty | Nominated | |
| 2020 | National Television Awards | Talent Show | Strictly Come Dancing | Won | |
| 2020 | TRIC Awards | Reality Programme | Strictly Come Dancing | Won | |
| 2021 | British Academy Television Awards | Best Entertainment Programme | Strictly Come Dancing | Nominated | |
| 2021 | British Academy Television Awards | Best Entertainment Performance | Claudia Winkleman | Nominated | |
| 2021 | British Academy Television Craft Awards | Best Director: Multi-Camera | Nikki Parsons | Nominated | |
| 2021 | British Academy Television Craft Awards | Best Entertainment Craft Team | David Bishop, Darren Lovell, David Newton, Richard Sillitto, Andy Tapley, Catherine Land | Nominated | |
| 2021 | National Television Awards | Talent Show | Strictly Come Dancing | Won | |
| 2021 | TRIC Awards | Reality Programme | Strictly Come Dancing | Nominated | |
| 2021 | Rose d'Or | Studio Entertainment | Strictly Come Dancing | Won | |
| 2022 | British Academy Television Awards | Best Entertainment Programme | Strictly Come Dancing | Nominated | |
| 2022 | British Academy Television Awards | Virgin TV's Must-See Moment | "Rose and Giovanni silent dance to 'Symphony'" | Won | |
| 2022 | British Academy Television Craft Awards | Best Director: Multi-Camera | Nikki Parsons | Nominated | |
| 2022 | British Academy Television Craft Awards | Best Entertainment Craft Team | David Bishop, Patrick Doherty, Catherine Land, David Newton, Richard Sillitto and Tom Young | Nominated | |
| 2022 | Royal Television Society Programme Awards | Judges' Award | Strictly Come Dancing | Won | |
| 2022 | Royal Television Society Craft & Design Awards | Make Up Design – Entertainment & Non Drama | Lisa Armstrong, Lisa Davey | Won | |
| 2022 | National Television Awards | Talent Show | Strictly Come Dancing | Won | |
| 2022 | National Television Awards | Talent Show Judge | Anton Du Beke | Won | |
| 2022 | TRIC Awards | Reality Programme | Strictly Come Dancing | Won | |
| 2023 | British Academy Television Awards | Best Entertainment Programme | Strictly Come Dancing | Nominated | |
| 2023 | British Academy Television Craft Awards | Best Director: Multi-Camera | Nikki Parsons | Nominated | |
| 2023 | British Academy Television Craft Awards | Best Entertainment Craft Team | Catherine Land, David Bishop, Patrick Doherty, Richard Silitto, David Newton, Joe Phillips | Won | |
| 2023 | National Television Awards | Talent Show | Strictly Come Dancing | Won | |
| 2023 | TRIC Awards | Entertainment Programme | Strictly Come Dancing | Nominated | |
| 2024 | British Academy Television Awards | Best Entertainment Programme | Strictly Come Dancing | Won | |
| 2024 | National Television Awards | Talent Show | Strictly Come Dancing | Won | |
| 2024 | National Television Awards | Expert | Anton Du Beke | Nominated | |
| 2024 | TRIC Awards | Entertainment Programme | Strictly Come Dancing | Won | |
| 2025 | TV Choice Awards | Talent Show | Strictly Come Dancing | Won | |
| 2025 | National Television Awards | Talent Show | Strictly Come Dancing | Won | |

== Strictly Come Dancing: The Game ==
In 2016, BBC Worldwide commissioned a match-3 mobile app game published by Donut Publishing and developed by Exient Entertainment. The game uses a mix of hand animation and motion-captured data for all the dances in the game, using pro dancers from the show (Chloe Hewitt and Neil Jones). The mo-cap process was featured on It Takes Two in the build-up to the release of the app. The game features over 150 dresses and 9 dances: Quickstep, Jive, Tango, Salsa, Charleston, Viennese Waltz, Rumba, Cha Cha Cha, and Paso Doble. It was released on the App Store and Google Play in early 2016, and is regularly updated with new dance features alongside new series of the show.

== See also ==
- Just the Two of Us – the same format, with singing instead of dancing
- Let's Dance for Comic Relief
