= Florian Wieder =

German production designer

- Born: Florian Andreas Wieder; 27 February 1968 (age 58); Munich, West Germany
- Education: Academy of Fine Arts of Munich
- Occupation: Production designer
- Website: wiederdesign.com

Florian Andreas Wieder (born 27 February 1968) is a German production designer, set designer and creative producer.

== Career ==
Wieder began his career studying music in the United States as a guitarist and musician. Inspired by the set design of Prince's Sign o' the Times Tour, he later pursued stage design at the Academy of Fine Arts of Munich. He founded the Munich-based production company Wieder Design in 1990, where he primarily designs sets.

=== Television ===
Wieder is one of the most famous television set designers in Germany. From 2001 until 2007, he worked as a production designer for TV total, and re-designed the set of Wetten, dass..? in 2008. He received the German Television Award for Best Studio Design for his work on Sabine Christiansen, Deutschland sucht den Superstar and Let's Dance.

He made his international breakthrough in 2004 when he began work as a production designer for The X Factor. He was scouted by producer Simon Cowell after his work on Deutschland sucht den Superstar and was hired to work on the inaugural series. He worked on the show until its fifteenth and final series in 2018, and was awarded the Judges Award by the Royal Television Society for his "outstanding work" and "[continued] innovation" on the series. He has since worked on numerous Syco Entertainment operations such as Britain's Got Talent, America's Got Talent and its spin-off series America's Got Talent: The Champions and America's Got Talent: All-Stars.

Wieder's success led him to an extended collaboration with MTV, where he worked as designer and creative producer for six consecutive editions of the MTV Video Music Awards and eight editions of the MTV Europe Music Awards. For his work on the 2010 MTV Video Music Awards, he was awarded the Primetime Emmy Award for Outstanding Production Design for a Variety or Reality Series.

He has worked as a production designer for many American television specials, such as the 2010 Pro Bowl, the 2010 Spike Video Game Awards and the 2011 CMT Music Awards, as well as reality competition and game shows like American Idol, Dancing With The Stars, Million Dollar Password, Spin the Wheel and Who Wants to Be a Millionaire. As production designer, he has worked with ABC and the Academy of Television Arts & Sciences on three consecutive editions of the Primetime Emmy Awards.

Since 2019, he has worked on the Masked Singer franchise in Germany, Switzerland, the United Kingdom and the United States. In 2022, he worked as production designer for the opening ceremony of the 2022 FIFA World Cup.

=== Eurovision Song Contest ===
Wieder has acted as production designer of the Eurovision Song Contest for eight editions since 2011, the latest being in 2026. He received the German Television Award for Best Entertainment Show for his work on the Eurovision Song Contest 2011.

Wieder's work on the Eurovision Song Contest has made a transformative impact in the contest's visual direction. Through the use of stage elements such as a catwalk, which has been prominent in many of his designs, and a proscenium arch, used decoratively in 2017 and 2019 to mark boundaries between artists and spectators, Wieder emphasises an intimate connection between artists and the public. Scholars argue his work has influenced subsequent contest productions, but that there is a risk of standardisation, stereotyping, and loss of national identity by regularly employing the same designers.

Wieder has also helped create multiple stage performances for the show, including German entries "Miss Kiss Kiss Bang" and "Sister" and the live-on-tape performance for the Austrian entry "Amen". He was responsible for the stage design of the German pre-selection shows in 2010–11, 2014, 2017–19 and 2022.

=== Music ===
Wieder has worked on set design for artists such as Adele, Beyoncé, Jennifer Lopez and U2.

Wieder is the designer and producer of the ongoing Rammstein Stadium Tour. His stage design was shortlisted for the Concert Production Design Award at the 2020 Design Achievement Awards.

In 2022, he was responsible for the stage design of the Bavaria Sounds concert series featuring Andreas Gabalier, Helene Fischer and Robbie Williams. The 150-metre wide diamond-shaped stage was the biggest Wieder had ever designed and was labelled "the wildest stage for a concert since Rock in Rio".

== Accolades ==
Award nominations for Florian Wieder
Year	Award	Category	Nominee(s)	Result	Ref.
2006	Deutscher Fernsehpreis	Best Production Design	Sabine Christiansen, Deutschland sucht den Superstar and Let's Dance	Won	
2007	Royal Television Society Craft & Design Awards	Production Design - Entertainment & Non-Drama Productions	The X Factor	Nominated	
2009	Eyes & Ears of Europe	Excellence Award	Himself	Won	
2009	Royal Television Society Craft & Design Awards	Judges Award	The X Factor	Won	
2011	ADG Excellence in Production Design Awards	Awards, Music, or Game Show	2011 MTV Video Music Awards	Nominated	
2011	British Academy Television Craft Awards	Best Entertainment Craft Team	The X Factor	Nominated	
2011	Eyes & Ears of Europe	Best Studio Design	Eurovision Song Contest 2011	Won	
2011	Eyes & Ears of Europe	Innovation Award	Eurovision Song Contest 2011	Won	
2011	Deutscher Fernsehpreis	Best Entertainment Show	Eurovision Song Contest 2011	Won	
2011	Primetime Emmy Awards	Outstanding Art Direction for Variety, Nonfiction, Reality or Reality-Competition Programming	2010 MTV Video Music Awards	Won	
2012	Opus	Lifetime Achievement Award	Himself	Won	
2013	British Academy Television Craft Awards	Best Entertainment Craft Team	The X Factor Final	Nominated	
2017	Eyes & Ears of Europe	Best Programme-Related Design Package	Eurovision Song Contest 2017	Won	
2017	Royal Television Society Craft & Design Awards	Production Design - Entertainment & Non Drama	Britain's Got Talent	Won	
2019	Deutscher Fernsehpreis	Best Show Production	Let's Dance	Nominated	
2020	Design Achievement Awards	Concert Production Design Award	Rammstein Stadium Tour	Shortlisted	
2023	Deutscher Fernsehpreis	Best Entertainment Production	Let's Dance	Nominated	
