= 2015 British Academy Television Craft Awards =

Technical achievements in television awards ceremony

16th British Academy Television Craft Awards
- Date: 26 April 2015
- Site: The Brewery, London
- Hosted by: Stephen Mangan

The 16th Annual British Academy Television Craft Awards were presented by the British Academy of Film and Television Arts (BAFTA) on 26 April 2015. Stephen Mangan hosted the event for the third consecutive year. The awards ceremony was held at The Brewery, City of London, recognizing technical achievements in British television of 2014.

== Winners and nominees ==
Winners are listed first and highlighted in boldface; the nominees are listed below.

Best Breakthrough Talent	Best Director - Fiction/Entertainment
**Marc Williamson** – **The Last Chance School**; Marcel Mettelsiefen – Dispatches (for "Children on the Frontline"); Regina Moriarty – Murdered by My Boyfriend; Chris Lunt – Prey	**Julian Farino** – **Marvellous**; Euros Lyn – Happy Valley; Hugo Blick – The Honourable Woman; Paul Andrew Williams – Murdered by My Boyfriend
Best Director - Factual	Best Director - Multi-Camera
**Dan Reed** – **The Paedophile Hunter**; Alisa Pomeroy – 24 Hours in Police Custody; Neil Crombie – Grayson Perry: Who Are You?; Ben Anthony – Life and Death Row (for "Execution")	**Paul McNamara** – **2014 FA Cup Final**; Chris Power – Ant and Dec's Saturday Night Takeaway; Directing Team – D-Day 70: The Heroes Return; Ben Kellett – Mrs. Brown's Boys
Best Writer - Comedy	Best Writer - Drama
**Detectorists** – **Mackenzie Crook**; Inside No. 9 – Reece Shearsmith, Steve Pemberton; Toast of London – Arthur Mathews, Matt Berry; The Wrong Mans (for "Episode 1") – Mathew Baynton, James Corden	**Sally Wainwright** – **Happy Valley**; Jed Mercurio – Line of Duty; Peter Bowker – Marvellous; Dennis Kelly – Utopia
Best Make Up and Hair Design	Best Production Design
**Penny Dreadful** – **Enzo Mastrantonio, Nick Dudman, Stefano Ceccarelli**; Da Vinci's Demons – Jacqueline Fowler; Peaky Blinders – Loz Schiavo; Strictly Come Dancing – Lisa Armstrong, Neale Pirie	**Penny Dreadful** – **Jonathan Mckinstry, Philip Murphy**; Peaky Blinders – Grant Montgomery; That Day We Sang – Tom Burton; Tommy Cooper: Not Like That, Like This – Candida Otton
Best Original Television Music	Best Costume Design
**Penny Dreadful** – **Abel Korzeniowski**; Downton Abbey – John Lunn; The Honourable Woman – Martin Phipps; Life and Death Row (for "Execution") – Richard Spiller	**The Musketeers** – **Phoebe de Gaye**; Cilla – Amy Roberts; Penny Dreadful – Gabriella Pescucci; Strictly Come Dancing – Vicky Gill
Best Photography – Factual	Best Photography and Lighting – Fiction
**Dispatches (for "Children on the Frontline")** – **Marcel Mettelsiefen**; Life and Death Row (for "Execution") – Ben Anthony, Luke Menges; Life Story (for "First Steps") – Camera Team; Photographing Africa – Richard Jones, Max Hug Williams, Harry Hook	**The Lost Honour of Christopher Jefferies** – **Mike Eley**; Da Vinci's Demons – Owen McPolin; The Honourable Woman – Zac Nicholson, George Steel; Peaky Blinders – Simon Dennis
Best Editing – Factual	Best Editing – Fiction
**Grayson Perry: Who Are You?** – **Jake Martin**; 24 Hours in Police Custody – Ben Brown; Life and Death Row (for "Execution") – Rupert Houseman; Tsunami: Survivors' Stories – Ben Stark	**Sherlock** – **Yan Miles**; The Fall – Steve Singleton; The Honourable Woman – Jason Krasucki; The Missing – Úna Ní Dhonghaíle
Best Digital Creativity	Best Entertainment Craft Team
**Live from Space: Online** – **Production Team**; Reverse the Odds: Stand Up To Cancer – Production Team; The Singer Takes It All – Production Team; War of Words VR – John Durrant, Seb Barfield, Paul Greer, Jack Norris	**The X Factor** – **Dave Davey, Robert Edwards, Falk Rosenthal**; The Apprentice –Tom Thurston-Mathews, James Clarke, Robin Trump, Mark Owen; The Voice – Jonnie Blackburn, Kevin Duff, Gurdip Mahal, David Tench; Strictly Come Dancing – Lisa Armstrong, Patrick Doherty, Vicky Gill, Tony Revell
Best Sound – Factual	Best Sound – Fiction
**Messiah at the Foundling Hospital** – **Mike Hatch, Kuz Randhawa, Matt Skilton**; The Choir: New Military Wives – Daniel Jones, Paul Taylor, Sarah Hunt, Pete Lee; Hidden Kingdoms (for "Under Open Skies") – Max Bygrave, Tim Owens, Kate Hopkins, Ben Peace; That Musical We Made – Roger Lucas, Oliver Rotchell, Stuart Hilliker, Alex Ellerington	**Sherlock** – **John Mooney, Douglas Sinclair, Howard Bargroff, Paul McFadden**; Cilla – Grant Bridgeman, Richard Davey, Simon Gershon, Keith Marriner; The Missing – Sound Team; That Day We Sang – Chris Ashworth, Emma Pegram, Stuart Hilliker, Alex Ellerington
Best Titles	Best Special, Visual and Graphic Effects
**Winter Olympics 2014** – **Mark Roalfe, Tomek Baginski, Ron Chakraborty**; Da Vinci's Demons – Paul McDonnell, Hugo Moss, Nathan Mckenna; Penny Dreadful – Erik Friedman, Rudy Jaimes, Ray Burris; Ripper Street – Nic Benns, Miki Kato, Jim Fisher	**Doctor Who** – **Milk VFX, Real SFX, BBC Wales VFX**; Atlantis – Vine FX, Colin Gorry; David Attenborough's Conquest of the Skies 3D – Colossus Productions, Vision3, Zoo VFX; Ripper Street – Screen Scene

=== Special Award ===
- **Hilary Briegel**

== See also ==
- 2015 British Academy Television Awards
