= Vicky Gill =

English costume designer (born 1973)

- Born: Vicky Barkess; 28 March 1973 (age 53); Stanley, County Durham, England
- Occupation: Costume designer
- Spouse: Mark Gill (m. 2002)
- Children: 3

Vicky Gill (née Barkess; born 28 March 1973) is an English costume designer, known for serving as head of costumes on the BBC dance competition series Strictly Come Dancing since 2012, as well as regularly appearing on the companion show Strictly Come Dancing: It Takes Two to demonstrate the costumes and designs. She has also designed outfits for the ITV competition series Dancing on Ice and Starstruck. Gill received a BAFTA for her costume team's work on Strictly Come Dancing in 2020.

== Life and career ==
Gill was born Vicky Barkess on 28 March 1973 in Stanley, County Durham, to father Alan, a butcher and a bus driver, and mother Emily Barkess (née George), a machinist and seamstress. She has two older brothers John and Barry. She attended Stanley Comprehensive School and said her interest in costume designed stemmed from her love of dance as a child, having specialised in freestyle, jazz, ballet and tap, as well as sewing with her mother. She went on to study fashion at Epsom School of Art and Design and Newcastle College, the latter of which where she met graphic designer Mark Gill, whom she married in 2002, and they have three children. She undertook work experience with designer Jenny Packham, which led her to working in high street menswear design, before she began specialising in dance wear. After being introduced to a stylist of the girl band Girls Aloud, she went on to do design several costumes for their concert tours, as well as for member Cheryl during her solo career. Gill has also designed costumes for singers Britney Spears and Kylie Minogue, as well as for stage shows including Priscilla, Queen of the Desert.

Since 2012, Gill has served as head of costume on the BBC competition series Strictly Come Dancing, having worked with the show since 2005, designing the outfits that the celebrities and professional dancers wear for their performances during the live shows. She regularly appears on the companion show Strictly Come Dancing: It Takes Two, where she gives updates on how the costumes are coming along prior to the week's performances, detailing the materials and any adjustments that may have to be made. Gill has also made costumes for several other programmes, including the ITV skating competition Dancing on Ice, as well as the singing competition Starstruck, Wedding Day Winners and All Star Musicals. She also designed costumes for Bollywood Carmen in 2013. Gill has received several nominations for her work, and in 2020, she won a BAFTA for her and her team on Strictly Come Dancing. She also appeared as a guest judge on the competition Stitch, Please! in 2022.

== Filmography ==
As herself
Year	Title	Notes	Ref.
2011–present	Strictly Come Dancing: It Takes Two	Costume designer	
2022	Stitch, Please!	Guest judge	
