= The Viaduct Tavern =

Listed pub in Holborn, London, England

- The pub in 2026

General information
- Type: Public house; originally a gin palace
- Location: 126 Newgate Street, Holborn London, England
- Coordinates: 51.51621°N 0.10173°W
- Year built: 1874–1875; 151 years ago
- Renovated: 1898–1900 (remodelled)
- Owner: Norges Bank

Design and construction
- Designations

Listed Building – Grade II
- Official name: The Viaduct public house
- Designated: 27 April 1990
- Reference no.: 1262465

Renovating team
- Architect: Arthur Dixon (1898–1900)

Website
- viaducttavern.co.uk

The Viaduct Tavern is a Grade II listed public house on Newgate Street in Holborn, London, England. Built in 1874–75 as a gin palace and extensively remodelled by Arthur Dixon between 1898 and 1900, it retains a richly decorated late Victorian interior. The pub is included on the Campaign for Real Ale (CAMRA)'s National Inventory of Historic Pub Interiors, where it has a three-star rating and is regarded as being of "outstanding national historic importance".

== History ==
The building was constructed in 1874–75 as a gin palace and its interior was extensively remodelled between 1898 and 1900 to designs by Arthur Dixon. The public house is named after Holborn Viaduct, the major thoroughfare linking Holborn with the City of London. The Viaduct Tavern stands on or near the site of the former Giltspur Street Compter, a City of London prison used to hold debtors and minor offenders before its closure in the mid-19th century. The pub's cellars have long been associated with the prison, although features sometimes described as former holding cells are now used for storage. The pub is also located opposite the site of Newgate Prison, reflecting the area's longstanding association with the administration of justice.

On 27 April 1990, the Viaduct Tavern was designated a Grade II listed building. It was included on the Campaign for Real Ale (CAMRA)'s National Inventory of Historic Pub Interiors before the inventory's grading system was revised. Under the revised scheme, it is rated three stars and its interior is regarded as being "of outstanding national historic importance". As of October 2026, the freehold was owned by Norges Bank, and the pub was leased by Fuller's.

== Architecture ==
=== Exterior ===
The building occupies a curved corner site and rises to four storeys beneath a slate roof with a steep upper section. The ground floor is faced in granite, while the upper storeys are built of pale brick with painted stone detailing. Brick chimney stacks project at either end of the roofline.

The street frontage is arranged in six bays, with an additional bay at ground-floor level. At street level, large display windows and recessed entrances are framed by polished stone columns and decorated with carved panels, including portrait roundels and other ornamental details inspired by Renaissance architecture.

The upper floors are marked by large sash windows set within moulded surrounds. Decorative panels, projecting cornices and pedimented window heads add emphasis to the façade, while vertical stone features divide the upper storeys. A prominent cornice runs along the top of the main elevation, above which are dormer windows set into the roof.

=== Interior ===
The interior in 2024

The ground-floor bar retains a largely intact historic interior, arranged around a curved, quadrant-shaped space with many original fittings. The bar counter incorporates decorative cut and etched glass panels, while an ornamental canopy marks the doorway at the rear and has carved detailing. Timber panelling runs around the bar area, and polished marbled columns support a plaster frieze featuring cherub motifs. The ceiling is decorated with moulded ornament, including curved coving and strapwork patterns. Further decorative features include extensive etched, gilded and cut-glass panels at the rear of the servery, a small glazed office behind the bar that was formerly used for the administration of the pub, and an ornate central screen incorporating carved woodwork and decorative glass.

One wall is lined with a series of tall mirrors interspersed with three paintings of women executed in a Pre-Raphaelite style by Hal Hurst, dating from around 1898–1900. These are framed by surrounds incorporating marble and alabaster in contrasting cream, green and orange tones. The paintings are set within an arcade of decorative stonework, while a heavily carved sliding door at the rear provides access to the former private accommodation above.

== See also ==
- List of pubs in London
