= Gin house =

Gin house may refer to a building in connection with:

== Alcoholic drink ==
- Gin palace

== Shortened form of the word, "engine" ==
- Gin gang
- A building housing a cotton gin
