= Finding Joy =

Finding Joy, In Search of Happiness or Searching for Happiness may refer to:

== Drama ==
- В поисках радости ("Finding Joy"/"Searching for Happiness") is a 1957 play by Russian playwright Victor Rozov

== TV and film ==
- Finding Joy, a 2025 drama written, produced, and directed by Tyler Perry
- Finding Joy, a 2018 Irish comedy television series written by and starring Amy Huberman
- Finding Joy, a 2013 film starring Josh Cooke
- Finding Joy, a 2002 Australian independent film featuring Angry Anderson
- In Search of Happiness (Russian В поисках счастья), a 2005 Russian documentary film directed by Alexander Gutman
- In Search of Happiness, a 2011 episode of Imagine, a British documentary series on the subject of Leo Tolstoy
- In Search of Happiness, a 1995 UK television series, presented by Angus Deayton
  - In Search of Happiness with Angus Deayton with Lise Mayer, a 1995 book based on the series

== Music ==
- Finding Joy, a 2002 EP by Hondo Maclean

== Literature ==
- Authentic Happiness: Using the New Positive Psychology to Realize Your Potential for Lasting Fulfillment, a 2002 self-help book by Martin Seligman
- The Continuum Concept: In Search of Happiness Lost a book by photographer Jean Liedloff
- In Search of Happiness a 1962 poetry collection by Michael Ondaatje
- In Search of Happiness an album by Golden Melody Award for Best Vocal Group nominated Chinese vocal duo Crispy脆樂團
