= Sebastian Thiel =

Zambian filmmaker

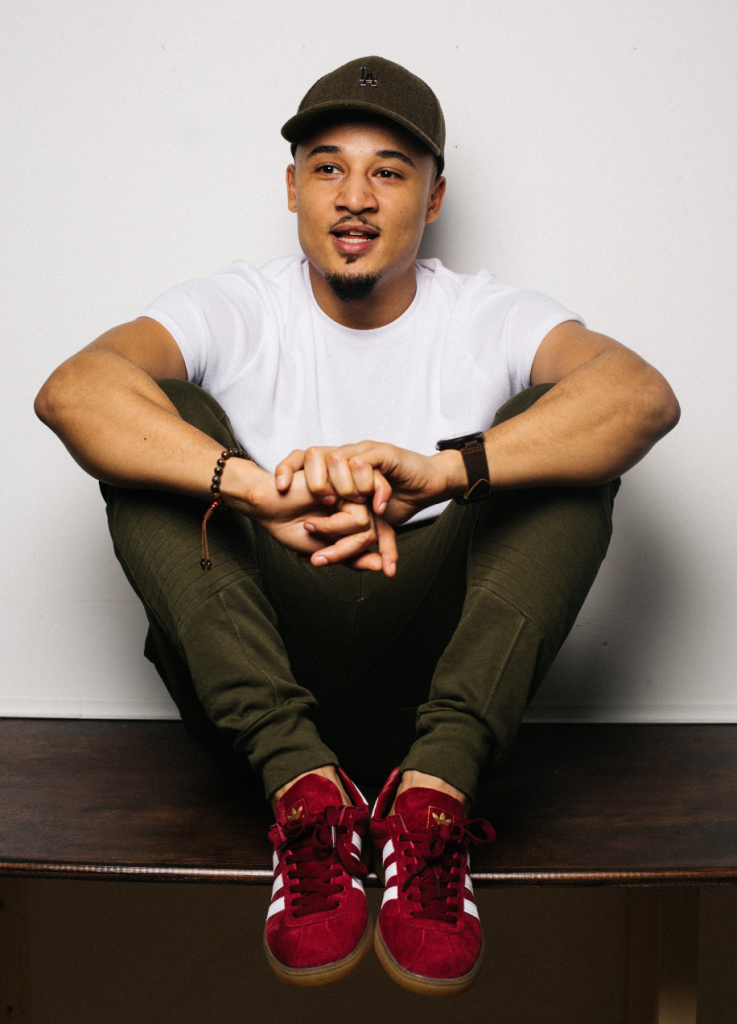
- Born: Sebastian Henry Thiel; Luanshya, Zambia
- Citizenship: United Kingdom
- Occupations: Film director; writer; producer
- Years active: 2008–present
- Agent: Cathy King
- Notable work: Just a Couple, Dreaming Whilst Black, Riches, Supacell
- Website: sebastian-thiel.com

Sebastian Henry Thiel is a Zambian-British filmmaker.

== Career ==
Sebastian Thiel's career in filmmaking commenced in 2008, following his pivot from aspirations in basketball. He established Upshot Entertainment, focusing on the production of short films and comedy sketches, and started distributing his self-produced videos on YouTube. His early projects garnered attention, notably receiving recognition from Richard Branson, who highlighted Thiel as a Virgin Media Pioneer.

By 2012, Thiel earned a spot on the Evening Standard's list of the Top 25 under 25 most influential Londoners and his short film Illegal Activity secured the Screen Nation Digital award. His documentary "Trap Town," which delves into the 2011 England riots, aired on London Live in 2014.

In 2017, Thiel took on multiple roles as the director, writer, and editor for Just a Couple starring his sister, Frieda Thiel, Michael Salami, Weruche Opia and Sean Sagar. This series, produced by Big Talk Productions. and aired on BBC Three, was recognised with several awards, including the "favourite comedy production" at Screen Nation and the "Debut Writer" award at The Debbies. It contributed to his inclusion on BBC's "new talent hotlist," curated by Idris Elba and Tony hall.

Within the UK's black film community, Thiel is frequently mentioned as a notable young black director who has made significant strides in television in recent years.

Thiel's engagement extends beyond filmmaking to public speaking, where he shares insights on creativity and social entrepreneurship As a teenager, he was a student at The School for Social Entrepreneurs. Collaborating with Entrepreneur Paul Lindley OBE and Musician Emmanuel Jal, Thiel worked on a documentary focusing on social entrepreneurship in Kenya, which was featured at One Young World. His company received the iDEA award, presented at Buckingham palace, in recognition of business innovation. In his TedxTalks, Thiel discusses the role of entertainment in societal change, emphasizing the importance of conscientious content creation, particularly in filmmaking, with a focus on supporting disenfranchised youth.

In 2019, John Boyega and Sebastian Thiel announced a collaborative project on Vice and Timeout, inspired by their childhoods. Thiel is represented by UTA in Los Angeles and 42 in the UK.

== Filmography ==
- Adot vs. Tboy: The Brotherhood (2011)
- Illegal Activity (2012)
- Friday UK (2012)
- Fill Me In (2013)
- Adots Apprentice (2013)
- Trap Town (2014)
- The Key (2015)
- Just a Couple (2017)
- Dreaming Whilst Black (2021)
- Riches (2022)
- Supacell (2024)
