= The Gentlemen (2024 TV series) =

TV series created by Guy Ritchie

- Genre: Action comedy; Black comedy; Crime drama
- Created by: Guy Ritchie
- Inspired by: The Gentlemen by Guy Ritchie
- Story by: Guy Ritchie; Matthew Read
- Starring: Theo James; Kaya Scodelario; Daniel Ings; Joely Richardson; Vinnie Jones; Giancarlo Esposito; Ray Winstone; Hugh Bonneville; Benedetta Porcaroli; Sergio Castellitto
- Music by: Christopher Benstead
- Countries of origin: United Kingdom; United States
- Original language: English (Note: With some dialogue in Arabic, Italian and Spanish.)
- No. of seasons: 2
- No. of episodes: 16

Production
- Executive producers: Guy Ritchie; Matthew Read; Ivan Atkinson; Bill Block; Marn Davies; Will Gould; Marc Helwig; Frith Tiplady
- Producer: Hugh Warren
- Cinematography: Ed Wild; Björn Charpentier; Callan Green
- Running time: 41–67 minutes
- Production companies: Moonage Pictures; Miramax Television

Original release
- Network: Netflix
- Release: March 7, 2024 – present

Related
- The Gentlemen (film)

The Gentlemen is a black comedy crime drama television series created by Guy Ritchie for Netflix. It is a spin-off of Ritchie's 2019 film of the same name, taking place in its fictional universe and sharing thematic connections but following a standalone story with a new cast, characters and settings. The series stars Theo James in the lead role and premiered on March 7, 2024. In August 2024, the series was renewed for a second season, which premiered on September 3, 2026. In August 2026, ahead of the second season premiere, the series was renewed for a third season.

== Cast and characters ==
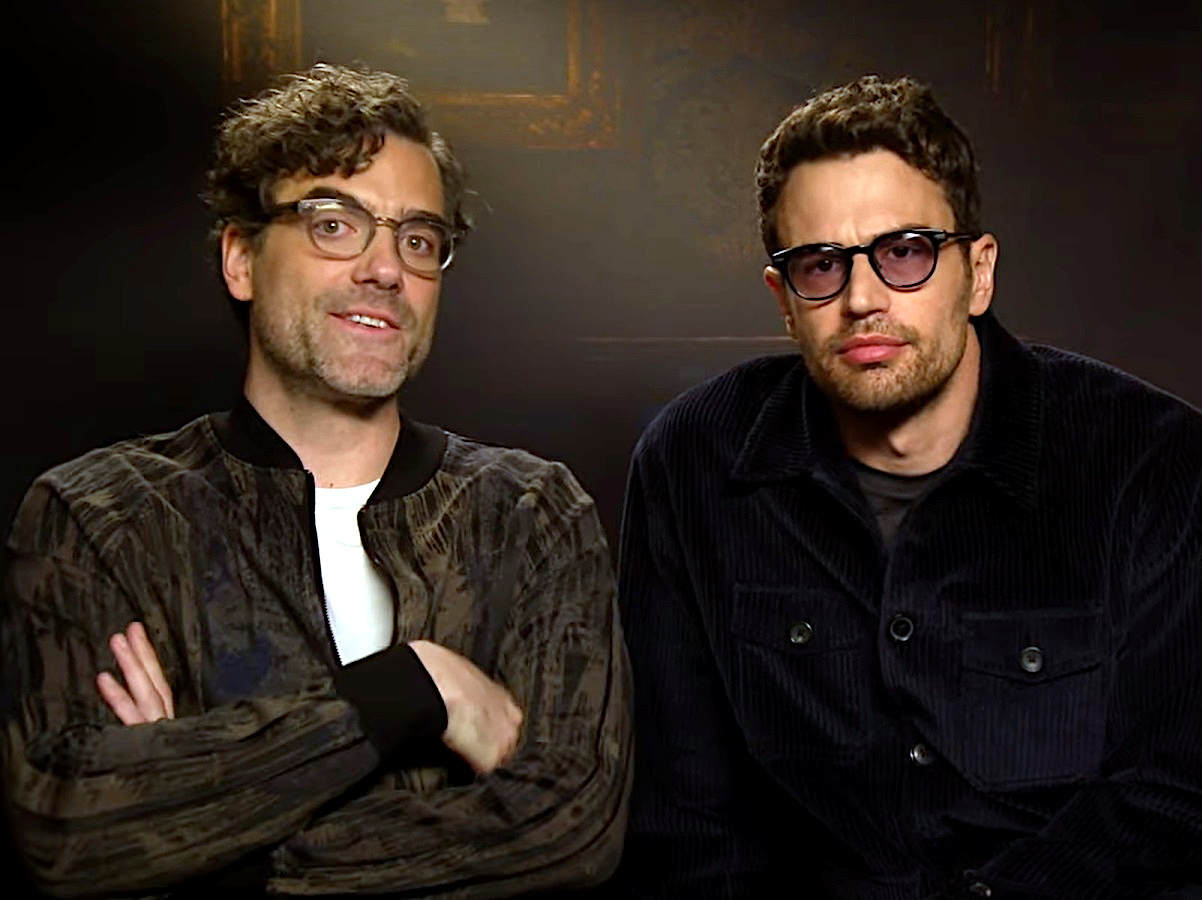
Daniel Ings and Theo James, the Horniman brothers (2024)

=== Main ===
- Theo James as Edward "Eddie" Horniman, the 13th Duke of Halstead and a former British Army captain who served as a United Nations peacekeeping officer as well as on combat deployments to Afghanistan.
- Kaya Scodelario as Susan "Susie" Glass, the daughter of and representative for Bobby Glass' criminal syndicate while he is in prison. She maintains a large-scale cannabis grow-op on the Halstead Manor and serves as Edward's advisor in professional criminal endeavors. Her front occupation is masquerading as an antiques dealer.
- Daniel Ings as Lord Frederick "Freddy" Horniman (seasons 1–2), Eddie's unreliable, cocaine-addicted older brother who is indebted to a Scouse crime family.
- Joely Richardson as Sabrina Horniman, the Dowager Duchess of Halstead and mother of Freddy, Eddie, and Charly. She is idealistic and maintains the moral high ground over her sons' criminal activity.
- Joshua McGuire (Note: Appears in one or two episodes, but is credited amongst the main cast.) as Peter Spencer-Forbes / "Sticky" Pete (season 1), a criminal con-man who targets Freddy.
- Vinnie Jones as Geoffrey Seacombe, the long-serving gamekeeper of Halstead Manor.
- Edward Fox as Archibald Horatio Landrover Horniman (season 1), the 12th Duke of Halstead and the ageing father of the Horniman siblings.
- Giancarlo Esposito as Stanley Johnston (seasons 1–2), a wine-loving American billionaire who seeks to buy Halstead Manor.
- Ray Winstone as Robert "Bobby" Glass, Susie's father and the incarcerated head of a cannabis empire that uses the grounds of Halstead Manor as part of its operation.
- Freddie Fox as Max Bassington (season 1), the 9th Lord Bassington Smythe and an aspiring actor with a dark secret.
- Kristofer Hivju as Florian de Groot (season 1), the Belgian distributor of cannabis from England to mainland Europe through Zeebrugge.
- Laurence O'Fuarain as JP Ward (season 1; guest season 2), the head of a traveller family who becomes Susie's cannabis distributor.
- Hugh Bonneville as Lord Richard Hawthorne (season 2), a corrupt politician who collaborates with Eddie to legalize marijuana.
- Michele Morrone as Francesco "Cico" Maldini (season 2), a fixer who helps Eddie and Susie expand their operations into Italy.
- Benedetta Porcaroli as Countess Isabella "Bella" Soranza de Parma (season 2), an Italian aristocrat and Marco's goddaughter.
- Sergio Castellitto as Marco Moretti (season 2), the ruthless leader of the Moretti crime family.
- Peter Ferdinando as Zero (season 2), the leader of a group of mercenaries who assault Halstead Manor.

=== Recurring ===
- Stephane Fichet as Mr. Lawrence, the Halstead family butler.
- Jasmine Blackborow as Lady Charlotte "Charly" Horniman, Eddie and Freddy's younger sister and mother of Tarquin.
- Chanel Cresswell as Tamasina "Tammy" Lady Freddy Horniman (season 1), Freddy's wife.
- Pearce Quigley as John "The Gospel" Dixon (seasons 1–2), the head of the Dixon crime family.
- John McGrellis as Errol (season 1; guest season 2), the second-in-command of the Dixon crime family.
- Michael Vu as James "Jimmy" Chang, Susie's chief cannabis grower.
- Harry Goodwins as Jack Glass, Susie's brother and a professional boxer.
- Alexis Rodney as Emory Stevens (season 1; guest season 2), Stanley's loyal assistant.
- Mason Antonio Fardowe as Keith (season 1), one of Susie's bodyguards.
- Logan Dean as "Blanket", another of Susie's bodyguards.
- Josh Finan as Jethro (season 1), the accountant for the Dixon crime family who has obsessive–compulsive disorder.
- Gaia Weiss as Princess Rosanne "Rosie" (season 1), Eddie's childhood friend and the Countess of Tournai who is 11th in the line of succession to the Belgian throne.
- Ruby Sear as Gabrielle, a mysterious woman who encounters and befriends Jimmy to steal from Glass's cannabis farms.
- Max Beesley as Henry Collins (season 1), an ex-army officer who is a successful London boxing promoter.
- Gary Beadle as "Thick" Rick (season 1), a former accountant who works with Henry to "wash" money through betting on boxing matches.
- Ranjit Krishnamma as Ahmed Iqbal (season 2; guest season 1), the Halstead family solicitor.
- Benjamin Clementine as Nanny Asante (season 2–present), Charly's husband, Tarquin's father, and a former soldier, who serves as an equerry to the King of the United Kingdom.
- Tyler Conti as Joseph "Joe" Green (season 2), Susie's childhood friend and a cocaine dealer.
- Claire Novelli as Angelica Marino (season 2), Marco's long-serving consigliere.

=== Guest ===
- Peter Serafinowicz as Tommy Dixon (season 1), John's brother and a high-ranking member of the Dixon crime family.
- Dar Salim as Felix (season 1), a "cleaner" hired by Susie.
- Cameron Cook as Tonibler / Toni Blair (season 1), the head of a Kosovan-Albanian gang.
- Martha Millan as Mercy Moreno (season 1), a Filipino dealer in high-end sports cars that is used as a front to ship Colombian cocaine.
- David Gant as the 8th Lord Bassington Smythe (season 1), Max's elderly father.
- John Thomson as Frank (season 1), a disgraced journalist who blackmails the Bassingtons.
- Hon Ping Tang as Sandy (season 1), a Chinese restaurant owner and loan shark to who Frank is indebted
- Leah McNamara as Kellie Ann Ward (season 1), JP's sister who attempts to steal generators from Susie's cannabis farm.
- John Connors as "Car Keys" Chris (season 1), a member of the Ward traveller family and JP's right hand.
- Guz Khan as Chucky Kubra, an experienced money launderer who works with Susie.
- Nigel Havers as Lord "Tibsy" Whitecroft (season 1), who previously worked with the Glass family.
- Maya Jama as Aisha (season 2–present), Susie's business acquaintance in the Middle East.
- Amra Mallassi as Prince Amir bin Abdullah al-Hadidi (season 2), Aisha's husband.
- Chris Eubank Jr as Organ John (season 2), a professional boxer and enforcer.
- Harvey Quinn as Robert Brook (season 2), an art dealer working for Cico.
- Masayoshi Haneda as Takashi (season 2), a Japanese hitman hired by Marco.
- Ian Bonar as Richard (season 2), an accountant whom Takashi is ordered to kill.
- George Webster as "Red" Ned (season 2), a disgruntled worker at one of Susie's cannabis farms.
- Antonio Bustorff as Victor (season 2), the leader of an Albanian gang who comes into conflict with the Glass criminal syndicate.
- Cassidy Little as Andy Brooks (season 2), a former soldier who served in the Queen's Dragoon Guards.
- Jane Horrocks as Bishop Thorne (season 2), the Bishop of Sussex who is an avowed anti-drugs campaigner.
- Jamie Ward as Oscar Thorne (season 2), Bishop Thorne's son who has a keen interest in falconry.
- Tom Davis as Aslan (season 2), Oscar's head of security.
- Stanley Townsend as Pat Gallagher (season 2), an Irish gangster and fight promoter who Oscar is indebted to.
- Cosimo Fusco as Carlos Vargas (season 2), the leader of an international cocaine smuggling operation based in Peru.
- Federico Calistri as Tancredi (season 2), an impudent man seeking Bella's affection.
- Richard McCabe as George Lamb (season 2), the gamekeeper for the neighbouring estate to Halstead.
- Orlando Bloom (season 3)
- Robert Carlyle (season 3)
- Elijah Wood (season 3)
- Dexter Fletcher (season 3)
- Bruna Marquezine (season 3)
- Ed Speleers (season 3)
- Saffron Burrows (season 3)
- Bugzy Malone (season 3)

== Episodes ==
Season	Episodes	Originally released
1	8	March 7, 2024
2	8	September 3, 2026

=== Season 1 (2024) ===
No. overall	No. in season	Title	Directed by	Written by	Original release date
1	1	"Refined Aggression"	Guy Ritchie	Guy Ritchie & Matthew Read	March 7, 2024
Eddie Horniman, a British Army officer attached to the United Nations, stationed at the border between Turkey and Syria, returns home to England while his father, the Duke of Halstead, is on his deathbed. The Duke dies and Eddie unexpectedly inherits the dukedom and family estate per his father's wishes, bypassing his irresponsible elder brother, Freddy. After assuming his new role, Eddie learns Freddy owes an £8 million debt to Tommy Dixon, a vicious Scouse drug dealer. Eddie decides to sell the estate to investor Stanley Johnston to raise the funds and save Freddy's life. However, he stops when he meets Susie Glass, who reveals the existence of a large cannabis farm beneath the estate, established from a financial arrangement between their fathers. Susie agrees to renegotiate terms with Tommy, managing to halve the debt in return for a rapid cash payment and Freddy's participation in a humiliating video. Eddie raises the £4 million by selling the estate wine collection to Johnston and, with Susie's help, securing back a major bet placed by Freddy with Sticky Pete, a deceptive bookmaker. Tommy arrives at the estate to collect the money and film the video. However, when Tommy repeatedly provokes an angry cocaine-fuelled Freddy, Freddy returns with a shotgun and shoots Tommy dead.
2	2	"Tackle Tommy Woo Woo"	Guy Ritchie	Guy Ritchie & Matthew Read	March 7, 2024
Immediately after Tommy's murder, his associate Jethro attempts to flee but is caught. Susie hires Felix, an underground crime scene "cleaner", to dispose of Tommy and murder Jethro. However, Eddie takes pity on him and comes up with an alternative plan to frame Jethro for Tommy's murder and help him flee the country. The next day, John "the Gospel" Dixon, Tommy's evangelical brother and head of the Scouse cocaine syndicate, arrives at the estate with his henchmen, looking for the missing Tommy. Eddie convinces them that Tommy and Jethro had an argument, so Jethro may be responsible for Tommy's disappearance. Later, whilst retrieving Jethro's passport from his flat, Eddie gets into a fight with one of Dixon's henchmen who was inside waiting for Jethro. Eddie ends up murdering him, but is shot in the process. Nursing the wound, Eddie is forced to attend a gala hosted by Johnston, who Susie reveals is a crystal meth kingpin. She suspects Johnston wants to expand his drug operations, and he makes her an offer to partner. Eddie then asks for a meeting with Bobby Glass, Susie's father, who is imprisoned in a luxury, open-air prison due to his wealth and influence. Eddie makes an offer to Bobby – end the cannabis operation in return for Eddie making even more money for Bobby. He agrees to consider the offer. Finally, Eddie helps Jethro flee the country, but unbeknownst to him, Susie secretly has Felix murder Jethro to tie up the loose end.
3	3	"Where's My Weed At?"	Nima Nourizadeh	Haleema Mirza & Matthew Read	March 7, 2024
Jimmy, the chief grower at the cannabis farm, loses a shipment when he is conned by a mysterious woman named Gabrielle. As the shipment is delayed, Susie agrees to undertake a favour for the inconvenienced customer – 'Tony Blair', the leader of a Kosovan-Albanian gang. They want to steal a Lamborghini Huracan, and the task is delegated to Eddie. It belongs to Mercy, a chop shop owner, who Eddie soon suspects of hiding more violent tendencies. When Eddie infiltrates the garage at night to steal the car, he discovers and rescues a captured member of Blair's gang. The member reveals that the Lamborghini contains a hidden cocaine shipment, as Mercy is also a drug dealer with Colombian backing. Blair deceived Eddie and Susie with a story about a car theft to obtain the cocaine. Freddy is captured by Mercy's gang and ransomed in return for the drugs. Eddie and Susie arrange an exchange, offering a captured Blair in return for Freddy. Mercy brutally kills Blair and lets Freddy go. Susie is impressed by Eddie's calmness under fire, although Eddie's mother, Lady Sabrina, worries about the impact of growing criminality on the family. Susie and her crew cannot find the stolen shipment, but Gabrielle contacts Jimmy again to continue the con.
4	4	"An Unsympathetic Gentleman"	Nima Nourizadeh	Matthew Read & Billy Mason Wood & Theo Mason Wood	March 7, 2024
Under pressure from Susie, Eddie approaches Max, the newly inherited Lord Bassington title-holder following his father Smythe's death, offering to construct a cannabis farm underneath his estate, thus replacing the one at Halstead Manor. Max is receptive but requires Eddie's help dealing with a blackmailer. Eddie agrees and meets the blackmailer, Frank, an ex-journalist, who swiftly escapes. Susie intervenes, and they track Frank down, taking him to a meeting with Max. Frank reveals Max is a secret Nazi and admirer of Adolf Hitler, even having Hitler's famed missing testicle in his possession. The meeting rapidly descends into a shootout, during which Max and Frank are wounded. Susie uses her enforcers to intimidate a defeated Max into signing a land deal. Separately, Lady Sabrina has gamekeeper Geoff introduce her to an alternative host for the cannabis farm – a local sheep farmer. Susie agrees to consider the possibility. Elsewhere, smitten by Gabrielle and unaware of her role in stealing the previous shipment, Jimmy shows her the farm and reveals key details of the distribution network.
5	5	"I've Hundreds of Cousins"	Eran Creevy	Stuart Carolan	March 7, 2024
Despite obtaining two new weed farms for the Glass empire, Bobby tells Susie he has no intention of letting Eddie walk away. Susie enlists Eddie's help when Florian de Groot, the manager of Glass distributions through Belgium, attempts to leverage a bigger financial cut. Simultaneously, two generators are stolen from the farm by the Ward family, a notorious group of Travellers. Eddie and Susie visit their leader, JP Ward, who reveals he knows of the weed operation and wants in. Eddie suggests using the Wards as distributors, cutting de Groot out. Susie agrees, and the new arrangement proves successful. However, suspicion falls on the Wards when £4 million is robbed from the farm. Eddie determines that de Groot orchestrated the theft to frame the Wards and resume his position. Eddie and Susie confront de Groot, forcing him to reveal Susie's bodyguard Keith helped him. Eddie hands Keith over to be executed by the Wards, but before he dies, Keith reveals Jethro's murder, shaking Eddie's faith in Susie. Elsewhere, Lady Sabrina and Geoff reflect on their former affair and the fact that Geoff is the biological father of Charlotte; Eddie and Freddy's sister.
6	6	"All Eventualities"	Eran Creevy	Stuart Carolan	March 7, 2024
Despite exceeding the financial threshold for his exit, Susie informs Eddie that it will take another three months for the money to be properly laundered and considered profit. There is a further complication when Chucky Kubra, Susie's money launderer, discovers her brother Jack having sex with his girlfriend. At a boxing party, Eddie meets Henry Collins, an ex-army officer and Jack's promoter, who offers to help launder the money. Initially, Eddie returns to Chucky when Susie fixes relations, but he is angered to learn she deliberately told Chucky to delay the laundering process. Eddie takes the money to Henry instead, prompting an argument where Susie reveals the Glasses have no intention of letting the Hornimans leave the empire. Seeking a way out, Eddie meets with Johnston to enlist his help. Meanwhile, Freddy tries to pitch growing 'cocaine-weed' to Susie, implying he would allow Eddie's murder to take over the estate and continue the operation. Susie rejects his offer, citing the importance of family. At a fight between Jack and an Uzbek boxer, Collins tells Susie he intends to take over the Glass drug empire, either peacefully or through war. Susie refuses and threatens Collins in return. On Collins' orders, Jack is knocked out in the ring and hospitalised.
7	7	"Not Without Danger"	David Caffrey	John Jackson	March 7, 2024
As Jack lies comatose in hospital, Susie blames Eddie. She oversees the assassinations of Collins' lieutenant and the Uzbek boxer, but Bobby reins her in, stating he will handle Collins himself. Eddie learns Johnston wants the names of the other 12 landowners who host Glass farms. Eddie and Freddy obtain them from Lord 'Tibsy' Whitecroft, a former Glass associate. Freddy confesses he asked Susie to have Eddie murdered, angering Eddie. Jimmy also confesses he told Gabrielle about Susie's whereabouts, prompting Susie to threaten Gabrielle. She reveals she works for Johnston and that he is the mastermind behind the thefts of the weed shipments, de Groot's shipping delays, Keith's betrayal and Collins' attacks, all in bids to weaken the Glass empire. Eddie hands the names over to Johnston's chief of staff, Stevens, but then visits Bobby, hinting at an alternative plan. Susie ambushes Collins and seriously wounds him, but he reveals Eddie's secret meetings with Johnston. In revenge, she calls John Dixon and reveals the truth behind Tommy's murder. Finally, a pregnant Charlotte returns from university, surprising the family and Geoff. Worried for her safety at the estate, Lady Sabrina tells her about the drug empire.
8	8	"The Gospel According to Bobby Glass"	David Caffrey	Matthew Read	March 7, 2024
When Jack wakes up from his coma, Susie discovers from Bobby that Eddie isn't a traitor, as he had given fake names to Johnston. Susie sends reinforcements to help the Hornimans protect the estate, but a shootout is averted when Bobby makes a deal with Dixon. Freddy and Eddie reconcile, whilst Charlotte and Geoff have a heart to heart, in which he admits he is her father. Bobby tells Susie and Eddie he is retiring and tasks them with overseeing bids for his empire from Johnston, the Colombians via Mercy, and the Russians via Sticky Pete. Eddie is also inspired to bid after Freddy calls him perfectly suited for the empire. Eddie assembles a consortium involving Tibsy, the other 12 lords, and Collins. Susie isn't interested in joining with Collins' presence, but Lady Sabrina's encouragement and Eddie's persuasion convince her. After all bids are submitted, Eddie sabotages his rivals by arranging for Johnston's arrest over tax affairs and the murders of Sticky Pete and Mercy. He also betrays Collins and executes him, having never intended to actually work with him. Impressed, Bobby reveals his retirement was a ruse to test Eddie and Susie's suitability to inherit the empire one day. With the new state of affairs in place, Johnston joins Bobby in the luxury open-air prison as another 'gentleman'.

=== Season 2 (2026) ===
No. overall	No. in season	Title	Directed by	Written by	Original release date
9	1	"The Road to Kingdom"	Guy Ritchie	Guy Ritchie & Matthew Read	September 3, 2026
Eddie and Susie have expanded the Glass operation into Italy with the help of mafia fixer Francesco "Cico" Maldini. At a shoot where guests include Cico, his girlfriend Countess Isabella "Bella" Soranza de Parma and the politically connected Lord Hawthorne, an attraction between Eddie and Bella makes Cico jealous. Eddie bribes Hawthorne with £30,000 and a night with Jack to gain his support for Eddie's election to a vacant hereditary peer seat in the House of Lords, so Eddie can block upcoming legislation to legalise marijuana. Cico tells Eddie and Susie they need to buy a Botticelli painting as a bribe for mafia Capo dei capi Marco Moretti, who has learned of their operation. Eddie is sceptical, but Bobby orders them to buy the painting, claiming a visit from the spirit Bannik told him so. Eddie worries about Bobby's health, but Susie dismisses his concerns and buys the painting after a bidding war. Together with Geoff, Jack, and Blanket, they foil an attempt to steal the painting and learn that Cico already owned it and was ripping them off behind Moretti's back. Travelling to Italy, they alert Moretti to Cico's treachery, and Moretti feeds him to a tiger. Eddie and Moretti strike a deal for protection and expansion of the Italian drug facilities.
10	2	"There's a Rat in the Kitchen"	Guy Ritchie	Guy Ritchie & Matthew Read	September 3, 2026
Eddie tells Moretti he intends to let the legalisation of marijuana pass, citing the potential to dominate the legal market as well as the illegal one. Eddie seeks Moretti's investment in the legal operation. He agrees, but also asks Eddie for help dealing with his embezzling accountant, Richard. Bella tells Eddie and Susie that Moretti has appointed her to replace Cico and will pay them back for the Botticelli. Geoff and Eddie host Takashi, Moretti's psychopathic hitman, and hiding his presence from Susie arouses her suspicions. Geoff and Eddie track down Richard but are forced to kill Takashi when he plans to massacre Richard's family. Eddie is forced to kill Richard, and they return home to be confronted by Susie. Hawthorne, dissatisfied with Jack's lack of attention on their night out, threatens to renege on his deal with Eddie. Eddie and Susie use Takashi's body to frame Hawthorne for manslaughter and thus blackmail him into sticking to the deal. Eddie wins the hereditary peer election and brings Susie in on his legalisation plan. Visiting Freddy in rehab, Lady Sabrina and Charly discover he's become a born again Christian. Unbeknownst to them, Freddy has fallen under John Dixon's influence and is planning to stake his claim to the dukedom.
11	3	"Do You Reject Satan?"	Eran Creevy	Guy Ritchie & Matthew Read & Danielle Ward	September 3, 2026
Glass farm workers go on strike over working conditions. Eddie and Susie humiliate strike leader Ned, leading him to steal several weed containers with the help of an Albanian gang. Some of the stolen product is an experimental batch of Jimmy's laced with synthetic DMT and causes mania, resulting in tragic incidents that might make news headlines. Eddie realises his legalisation plan is at risk if the tainted batch gets sold. Victor, the Albanian leader, kills Ned and attempts to force his way into the Glass operation. Eddie and Susie have his gang murdered, forcing Victor to return the shipments. Meanwhile, Eddie feels guilt over murdering Richard, which is heightened when Bella reveals Richard was actually an innocent witness Moretti simply wished to silence. Eddie threatens neighbouring landowner McDougall into selling his estate to him, as part of Eddie's desire to reclaim land the Horniman family lost generations before. Eddie also continues to clash with and disobey Bobby. Bobby warns Susie about her relationship with Joe Green, an old friend and cocaine dealer. At the christening of Charly and Nanny's son Tarquin, Charly has Nanny renege on a plan to make the King one of Tarquin's godfathers, in favour of Geoff. Susie agrees to Eddie's legalisation plan and the two resolve to start lobbying Eddie's fellow peers in Parliament.
12	4	"The Bigger Picture"	Eran Creevy	Guy Ritchie & Matthew Read	September 3, 2026
To gain crucial votes from the Lords Spiritual, Eddie plans to bribe the Bishop of Sussex by aiding her son Oscar. Oscar, in debt to Irish mobster Pat Gallagher, can clear his debt if he retrieves a valuable breeding Saker falcon. This lets Gallagher bribe avid falconer, Sheikh Abdulah Suleiman, to help him escape British justice by providing a visa to Dubai. However, Oscar has lost the falcon. Seeking Bella's familial knowledge of falcons, Eddie and Susie go on a double date with Bella and Joe. Joe is humiliated by former acquaintances and reacts violently, worrying Eddie. Bella helps retrieve the falcon, allowing Eddie to give the Sheikh and Gallagher what they want and secure the Bishop's support. Hawthorne, struggling with guilt over his supposed 'murder', accidentally lets slip the Duke's plan to Jack. Susie convinces Hawthorne to cajole votes by admitting Takeshi's body was planted, but Bobby has Hawthorne killed to make support collapse and prevent the bill from passing. Bobby angrily berates Eddie and Susie over their betrayal, prompting Eddie to aggressively stand up to Bobby, feeling slighted. Susie is sent abroad while Bobby has Eddie kidnapped at the estate.
13	5	"A Suburban A-Road on the Outskirts of Basingstoke"	Eran Creevy	Guy Ritchie & Matthew Read & John Jackson	September 3, 2026
A badly beaten Eddie is left in a shallow grave. He painfully pulls himself across fields over three days until a passerby rescues him. As he recovers over the next few months, Eddie becomes a recluse while planning revenge on Bobby. However, he changes his plans when Geoff warns him that he may have to eliminate Susie alongside Bobby. Instead, Eddie secures a loan from Johnston to pay back Moretti's investment, using Halstead Manor as collateral. Johnston also inspires Eddie by claiming he has heritage dating back to Trojan King Priam, while Bella visits and declares her love for Eddie. Susie and Joe visit powerful cocaine producer Carlos Vargas in Peru to propose a UK expansion, secretly piggybacking on the Glass operation behind Bobby's back. Vargas' intermediary, Hector, claims Vargas accepted the offer, and Susie and Joe start production and distribution with help from JP Ward and Chucky Kubra. However, Arturo, Vargas' lieutenant, takes Susie and Joe hostage and reveals Vargas never agreed to the deal. Jack and Gabrielle save Susie and Joe, but Susie realises Joe killed Hector and had been deceiving her from the start of their relationship. She hands Joe to Vargas as retribution. Eddie tells Susie he wants to claim "everything" and flies to Italy to propose to Bella, who accepts.
14	6	"The Bells of San Domenico"	Guy Ritchie	Guy Ritchie & Matthew Read & Ian Weatherby	September 3, 2026
Eddie asks Freddy to be the best man for his wedding at Lake Maggiore, but Freddy rejects him and reiterates his bitterness over the inheritance. Moretti and Eddie negotiate a new distribution deal, but Moretti's consigliere Angelica challenges Eddie and suggests alternative money laundering measures. Susie attends the wedding but warns Eddie that Bobby may see the marriage, and his dealings with Marco, as a threat. At the pre-wedding party, Bella is harassed by former pursuer Tancredi, while Nanny discovers a marijuana farm under the villa. Eddie confronts Tancredi in his hotel room and accidentally kills him. Angelica cleans up Tancredi’s room and tries to blackmail Eddie into agreeing to her money laundering plan. However, Eddie rebukes her, revealing he knows about her embezzlement from Marco's accounts. Bella makes Eddie confess his sins to a priest, where he admits to his murders without remorse and scrutinises the process of confession. Eddie and Bella get married, which Susie refuses to watch. The next day, the couple race to their honeymoon destination, Eddie by car and Bella by floatplane, but Bella is killed when the plane explodes mid-air.
15	7	"This Mad Circus"	Nick Rowland	Guy Ritchie & Matthew Read	September 3, 2026
Sabrina, Geoff, Charly, Nanny, and Tarquin return to the estate from Italy the day after the wedding. Nanny acts dismissive towards Geoff and reveals his knowledge of the farms. During the night, Geoff and the neighbouring gamekeeper George notice mercenaries in the woods of the estate, and the house experiences power and internet loss. Geoff and Nanny help Charly, Tarquin and Sabrina evacuate by killing multiple mercenaries. However, the mercenaries kidnap Tarquin on instructions from their client. Geoff, Nanny, Charly and George kill the mercenaries in the woods, although the butler Mr. Lawrence and Nanny get shot. Nanny and Geoff reconcile as Geoff admits to being Tarquin's grandfather through his affair with Sabrina. Later, Susie questions Bobby over his role in Bella's death, confirmed to have been caused by an explosive device, though Bobby insists he is not responsible. Eddie violently kills mercenaries sent to his safehouse in Gstaad.
16	8	"Bring Me the Head"	Eran Creevy	Guy Ritchie & Matthew Read	September 3, 2026
Eddie embarks on vengeance after Bella's death and the manor attack. He tortures and kills a mercenary who admits Bobby's responsibility under duress. Susie pleads for her and Bobby's innocence, given that Bobby had purchased Eddie's debt to Johnston, requiring Eddie to be alive. Having already called a hit on Bobby through Moretti, Eddie stops the assassin with Bobby's assistance. Johnston encourages Eddie to use his hardships as motivation to achieve king-like status. Sabrina suspects Freddy after he calls to ask about Tarquin's safety. Eddie realises that Dixon orchestrated the attacks with the help of Freddy, and sets up a meeting between Vargas and Dixon. Eddie and Susie's crew kill all of Dixon's men, and Dixon reveals the plot was vengeance for his brother's death. Eddie meets Freddy at the rehab facility and beats him. Freddy admits trying to reclaim the dukedom by killing Eddie and removing Tarquin as an heir. Eddie spares Freddy, but forces him to decapitate Dixon with a chainsaw.

== Production ==
Promotional poster for season one

Guy Ritchie entered development of a television series for him to write and direct inspired by his film The Gentlemen with Moonage Pictures and Miramax Television in October 2020. Ritchie was also executive producing alongside the producers of the original film. Matthew Read helped Richie write the pilot script, also coming on board to executive produce at Moonage with Will Gould, and Netflix ultimately ordered the series.

The cast, including Theo James, Kaya Scodelario, Daniel Ings, Joely Richardson, Giancarlo Esposito, Peter Serafinowicz, and Vinnie Jones, was announced the week before filming was set to begin, and Alexis Rodney was added in the first week of filming. In June 2023, Max Beesley was added to the cast, and Hugh Warren was revealed as the series producer. Chanel Cresswell joined the cast in a recurring role during production in December. Ray Winstone, Jasmine Blackborow, and Michael Vu were also revealed to be part of the cast through a teaser in January 2024.

Production took place in London and Badminton House, running from November 2022 through June 2023. Filming took place at Longcross Studios and West London Film Studios with additional on-location shooting throughout the city, including at the Princess Victoria pub and the Tate Modern as well as areas of Hackney and Islington. Stoke Poges in Buckinghamshire is used for two locations with Stoke Court the location of the prison where Bobby Glass is seen on the roof with his pigeons and Chucky's mansion is a property on West End Lane. The backdrop of Printworks London was also present during the first episode.

On August 14, 2024, the series was renewed for a second season. In May 2025, Hugh Bonneville, Benjamin Clementine, Benedetta Porcaroli, Michele Morrone, Sergio Castellitto, Amra Mallassi, Tyler Conti, Chris Eubank Jr, and Maya Jama joined the cast for the second season.

On August 24, 2026, the series was renewed for a third season. In October 2026, Orlando Bloom, Robert Carlyle, Elijah Wood, Dexter Fletcher, Bruna Marquezine, Ed Speleers, Saffron Burrows, and Bugzy Malone joined the cast for the third season, while both Ings and Esposito were confirmed not to return.

== Release ==
The first season premiered on Netflix on March 7, 2024. The second season premiered on September 3, 2026.

== Reception ==
=== Critical response ===
The review aggregator Rotten Tomatoes reported a 75% approval rating with an average rating of 7.0/10, based on 74 critic reviews. The website's critics consensus reads, "Slick as a well-pressed suit and given watchable wattage by its cast, Guy Ritchie's The Gentlemen doesn't seamlessly expand upon the original movie but has enough verve to be fun on its own terms." Metacritic gave it a weighted average score of 66 out of 100 based on 27 critics, indicating "generally favorable reviews".

Anita Singh of The Telegraph gave the series three stars out of five, describing it as "everything you want from a Guy Ritchie caper." Lucy Mangan of The Guardian rated it three out of five, and summarized it as "a lot of daft stories crammed together and spattered with blood for your entertainment", recommending it to viewers who are fans of Ritchie's films.

=== Accolades ===
Award	Date of ceremony	Category	Nominee(s)	Result	Ref.
Gotham TV Awards	June 4, 2024	Outstanding Performance in a Comedy Series	Kaya Scodelario	Nominated	
Astra TV Awards	August 18, 2024	Best Streaming Comedy Series	The Gentlemen	Nominated	
Astra TV Awards	August 18, 2024	Best Actor in a Streaming Comedy Series	Theo James	Nominated	
Astra TV Awards	August 18, 2024	Best Supporting Actor in a Streaming Comedy Series	Giancarlo Esposito	Nominated	
Astra TV Awards	August 18, 2024	Best Directing in a Streaming Comedy Series	Guy Ritchie (for "Refined Aggression")	Nominated	
Set Decorators Society of America Awards	August 5, 2024	Best Achievement in Décor/Design of a One Hour Contemporary Series	Linda Wilson, Amy Cooper-Goodrich, Martyn John	Nominated	
Primetime Creative Arts Emmy Awards	September 7–8, 2024	Outstanding Production Design for a Narrative Contemporary Program (One Hour or More)	Martyn John, Fiona Gavin, and Linda Wilson (for "Tackle Tommy Woo Woo")	Nominated	
Primetime Creative Arts Emmy Awards	September 7–8, 2024	Outstanding Stunt Coordination for a Comedy Series or Variety Program	Mark Mottram	Won	
Primetime Emmy Awards	September 15, 2024	Outstanding Directing for a Comedy Series	Guy Ritchie (for "Refined Aggression")	Nominated	
Golden Globe Awards	January 5, 2025	Best Television Series – Musical or Comedy	The Gentlemen	Nominated	
