= The Gentlemen (2019 film) =

Crime comedy film by Guy Ritchie

- Theatrical release poster
- Directed by: Guy Ritchie
- Screenplay by: Guy Ritchie
- Story by: Guy Ritchie; Ivan Atkinson; Marn Davies
- Produced by: Guy Ritchie; Ivan Atkinson; Bill Block
- Starring: Matthew McConaughey; Charlie Hunnam; Henry Golding; Michelle Dockery; Jeremy Strong; Eddie Marsan; Colin Farrell; Hugh Grant
- Cinematography: Alan Stewart
- Edited by: James Herbert; Paul Machliss
- Music by: Christopher Benstead
- Production companies: Miramax; Toff Guy Films
- Distributed by: Entertainment Film Distributors (United Kingdom); STXfilms (United States)
- Release dates: December 3, 2019 (Curzon Mayfair Cinema); January 1, 2020 (United Kingdom); January 24, 2020 (United States)
- Running time: 113 minutes
- Countries: United Kingdom; United States
- Language: English
- Budget: $22 million
- Box office: $126.2 million

The Gentlemen is a 2019 crime comedy film, directed and produced by Guy Ritchie, co-written with Marn Davies and Ivan Atkinson. Starring Matthew McConaughey, Charlie Hunnam, Henry Golding, Michelle Dockery, Jeremy Strong, Eddie Marsan, Colin Farrell, and Hugh Grant, the film follows an American drug lord in the United Kingdom who is looking to sell his cannabis empire, setting off a chain of blackmail and schemes to undermine him.

The Gentlemen was premiered at the Curzon Mayfair Cinema on December 3, 2019, and was released in cinemas in the United Kingdom on January 1, 2020, by Entertainment Film Distributors, and in the United States on January 24, 2020, by STXfilms. It received generally positive reviews from critics and was also a commercial success, grossing $126 million worldwide against its $22 million budget. A spin-off television series was released by Netflix in 2024 with Theo James starring in the lead role.

== Plot ==
Michael "Mickey" Pearson is a Florida trailer park-raised American who won a Rhodes Scholarship to Oxford University, where he began selling marijuana before dropping out and becoming a drug baron, building a criminal empire in blood and growing cannabis in labs on the estates of aristocratic landlords who needed cash for the upkeep of their stately homes.

Now middle-aged, Pearson plans to sell his empire and retire peacefully with his wife, Rosalind. His chosen buyer is American billionaire and cannabis baron Matthew Berger, and his sale price is £400 million. After showing Berger one of the labs, Pearson is approached by up-and-coming Chinese gangster Dry Eye, who offers to buy him out, but Pearson turns him down.

Amateur MMA fighters and aspiring YouTubers "The Toddlers" raid the lab Pearson showed to Berger; they overpower the guards, steal marijuana, and upload a rap video of their caper online. The Toddlers' horrified trainer, "Coach", orders them to delete the video.

Seeking to expose Pearson, Daily Print tabloid newspaper editor Big Dave hires private detective Fletcher to investigate Pearson's links to one of his landlords, Lord Pressfield, a duke whose daughter Laura is a heroin-addicted pop star living in a council estate with other addicts. At Pressfield's request, Pearson sends his right-hand man, Raymond, to bring Laura home. In a brawl with her flatmates, one of Raymond's men accidentally kills Aslan, a young Russian. Laura is returned to her parents, but shortly after, she relapses and dies of an overdose.

Coach visits Raymond, apologises for The Toddlers' actions, and offers his services in compensation. Coach discovers that The Toddlers learned about Pearson's lab location from Dry Eye. Dry Eye is actually in league with Berger, who seeks to disrupt Pearson's business in order to reduce the sale price; Dry Eye, meanwhile, continues to covet Pearson's empire for himself. Dry Eye tries to kidnap Rosalind, who kills his men before running out of bullets; Pearson arrives on the scene and kills Dry Eye as he is about to rape her.

Fletcher attempts to blackmail Pearson, offering Raymond everything he has discovered about these events for £20 million; otherwise, he says he will turn the information over to Big Dave. Coach has The Toddlers capture Big Dave; they drug him and film him having sex with a pig, threatening to post the video online unless he drops his investigation.

Pearson and Berger meet to finalise the sale, and Berger reduces his offer to £130 million, ascribing the lower price to the recent disruptions in Pearson's business. Pearson reneges on the deal entirely, citing Berger's sabotage, and forces him into a freezer where he will die unless he transfers £270 million to Pearson as compensation for the cost of getting his affairs back in order. In addition, Pearson demands "a pound of flesh" from any part of Berger's body as recompense for the assault on Rosalind.

Fletcher returns for his payment, but Raymond reveals he has been tailing Fletcher all along and has had the Toddlers retrieve Fletcher's evidence, nullifying his blackmail threat. Fletcher tells Raymond he also sold information about Pearson to Aslan's father, a Russian oligarch and former KGB agent who is keen to avenge his son's death and has sent assassins to kill both Pearson and Raymond. Coach kills the two sent for Raymond. Two other Russians kidnap Pearson, but The Toddlers ambush them and riddle their car with bullets, killing the Russians and allowing Pearson to escape.

The Pearsons return to their cannabis empire and celebrate together. Fletcher gets in a cab on his way out of the country, but sees that Raymond is the driver and he is a prisoner.

== Cast ==
- Matthew McConaughey as Michael "Mickey" Pearson, an American and head of London's illicit cannabis trade
  - Tom Lambert as Young Mickey Pearson
- Charlie Hunnam as Raymond Smith, Pearson's right-hand man
- Henry Golding as "Dry Eye", a Chinese gangster
- Jeremy Strong as Matthew Berger, an American billionaire seeking to purchase Pearson's drug empire
- Colin Farrell as "The Coach", mentor to "The Toddlers"
- Hugh Grant as Fletcher, a private investigator who attempts to blackmail Pearson
- Michelle Dockery as Rosalind Pearson, Mickey's wife
- Eddie Marsan as "Big" Dave, editor of a tabloid newspaper, who holds a grudge against Pearson
- Bugzy Malone as Ernie, one of "The Toddlers", a group of YouTubers who raid one of Pearson's sites
- Tom Wu as "Lord" George, Dry Eye's boss
- Jason Wong as Phuc, a henchman of Dry Eye's
- George Asprey as Lord Snowball, one of Pearson's lords
- Samuel West as Lord Pressfield, one of Pearson's lords
- Geraldine Somerville as Lady Pressfield
- Eliot Sumner as Laura Pressfield, Lord Pressfield's heroin-addicted daughter
- Simon Barker as Frazier
- Chidi Ajufo as "Bunny"
- David Garrick as Dave
- Guy List as Security Guard Guy
- Lyne Renée as Jackie Berger, Matthew's wife
- Chris Evangelou as "Primetime"
- Franz Drameh as "Eggs" Benny
- James Warren as Jim "The Iron Chin"
- Sean Sagar as Mal "Ghost"
- Tom Rhys Harries as Power Noel
- Danny Griffin as Aslan
- Max Bennett as Brown
- Togo Igawa as Wang Yong
- Bruce Chong as Ngoc
- John Dagleish as "Hammy"
- Gershwyn Eustache Jr as Roger
- Lily Frazer as Lisa
- Brittany Ashworth as Ruby
- Ashley McGuire as Maureen
- Eugenia Kuzmina as Misha
- Jordan Long as Bobby
- Andrew Greenough as Miramax Studio Executive

== Production ==
=== Development and casting ===
It was announced in May 2018 that Guy Ritchie would write and direct Toff Guys, a film that would be in the same spirit as his earlier Lock, Stock and Two Smoking Barrels and Snatch. The project was unveiled at the 2018 Cannes Film Festival by CAA Media Finance and Rocket Science where Miramax acquired the distribution rights for more than $30 million and joined the film as a co-financier. Filming was expected to begin in October. In October, Matthew McConaughey, Kate Beckinsale, Henry Golding and Hugh Grant were cast, with Jeremy Strong, Jason Wong and Colin Farrell joining in November. Later, Michelle Dockery signed on, replacing Beckinsale in her role. In December 2018, Lyne Renée was added as well.

=== Filming ===
Principal photography began in November 2018. Filming locations included West London Film Studios, Longcross Studios, The Princess Victoria pub in Shepherd's Bush and Brompton Cemetery.

== Release ==
In February 2019, STX Entertainment acquired U.S. distribution rights to the film, retitled Bush, from Miramax for $7 million. The film would be retitled once again to The Gentlemen, premiering as a VIP special screening at Curzon Mayfair on December 3, 2019. It was theatrically released in the UK on January 1, 2020, and in the US on January 24, 2020. The studio spent around $25 million on promoting the film.

=== Home media ===
The Gentlemen was released on home media and video on demand on March 24, 2020. It was previously set for a home media release on April 7, but was moved up due to the COVID-19 pandemic. It was released on DVD, Blu-ray, and Ultra HD Blu-ray on April 21, 2020, by Universal Studios Home Entertainment.

== Reception ==
=== Box office ===
The Gentlemen grossed $15.9 million in the United Kingdom, $36.5 million in the United States and Canada, and $73.8 million in other countries, for a worldwide total of $126.2 million.

In the United States and Canada, the film was released alongside The Turning, and was projected to gross around $10 million from 2,100 theaters in its opening weekend. The film made $3.1 million on its first day, including $725,000 from Thursday night previews. It went on to debut to $10.6 million, finishing fourth at the box office. It then made $6 million in its second weekend, finishing fifth. In its third and fourth weekends the film made a respective $4.2 million and $2.7 million.

=== Critical response ===
On review aggregator Rotten Tomatoes, the film has an approval rating of 75% based on 277 reviews, with an average rating of 6.6/10. The website's critics consensus reads, "It may not win writer-director Guy Ritchie many new converts, but for those already attuned to the filmmaker's brash wavelength, The Gentlemen stands tall." On Metacritic, the film has a weighted average score of 51 out of 100, based on 44 critics, indicating "mixed or average reviews". Audiences polled by CinemaScore gave the film an average grade of B+ on an A+ to F scale, while PostTrak reported an average 3.5 out of 5 stars, with 48% of people saying they would definitely recommend it.

Writing for Entertainment Weekly, Leah Greenblatt rated the film a B− and found it to come up short when compared to Ritchie's previous crime films, stating, "The Gentlemen is nothing if not a callback to the Locks of yesteryear, star-stacked and defibrillated with enough juice to jolt a gorilla out of cardiac arrest."

=== Accolades ===
Award	Year	Category	Recipient	Result	Ref.
Saturn Awards	October 26, 2021	Best Action or Adventure Film	The Gentlemen	Nominated	

=== Lawsuit ===
Three years after the film's release, Ritchie was sued by the actor Mickey De Hara (who had played Turbo in Ritchie's prior film RocknRolla) for copying the "cast of characters, their characterisation and 'unique aspects of the plot'" from a screenplay De Hara had offered Ritchie as a sequel to RocknRolla. De Hara claimed that when he had tried to address the issue out of court, Ritchie responded, "Mickey, I and my people have tried to contact you for some years now. There was no response. I am happy for us to sit down and have a chat." De Hara claimed that the most blatant instance of copying was a scene involving the character Coach and "The Toddlers" gang he leads, which was an almost exact match to a scene from De Hara's screenplay with a character Coach leading a group of thugs nicknamed "The Baby Squad." Ritchie filed his defence to the London High Court denying the allegations in August 2023. Ritchie confirmed that discussions took place regarding a potential RocknRolla sequel or trilogy and that he used some aspects of the screenplay for The Gentlemen; however, he claimed the contributions of De Hara were well below both the Writers Guild of America and Writers Guild of Great Britain thresholds to receive credit.

== Netflix series ==
In October 2020, Miramax Television started development on a spin-off television series of the film, with Ritchie overseeing the project. In November 2022, the series was officially greenlit by Netflix. The plot was written by Guy Ritchie and Matthew Read. Ritchie directed the first two episodes and serves as executive producer alongside Ivan Atkinson, Marn Davies, and Bill Block. The Gentlemen stars Theo James, alongside Vinnie Jones, Kaya Scodelario, Giancarlo Esposito, Daniel Ings, Joely Richardson, Peter Serafinowicz, Alexis Rodney, Chanel Cresswell and Max Beesley.
