= Riches (TV series) =

- Genre: Drama
- Created by: Abby Ajayi
- Written by: Abby Ajayi
- Directed by: Abby Ajayi; Darcia Martin; Sebastian Thiel
- Starring: Deborah Ayorinde; Hugh Quarshie; Sarah Niles; Brendan Coyle; Hermione Norris
- Music by: Vince Pope
- Country of origin: United Kingdom
- Original language: English
- No. of series: 1
- No. of episodes: 6

Production
- Executive producers: Abby Ajayi; Alison Carpenter; Polly Hill; Amanda Jenks; Nadine Marsh-Edwards; Alison Owen
- Producer: Yvonne Francas
- Cinematography: Oli Russell; Tom Hines; Daniel Stafford-Clark
- Editors: Helen Murphy; Matteo Bini; Becky Trotman
- Production companies: Greenacre Film; Monumental Television; Amazon Studios

Original release
- Network: ITVX (United Kingdom); Amazon Prime Video (United States)
- Release: 2 December 2022

Riches is a British drama television series created by Abby Ajayi, starring Deborah Ayorinde, Hugh Quarshie, and Sarah Niles. It premiered on 22 December 2022 in the United Kingdom on ITVX, and on Amazon Prime Video in the United States on 2 December 2022.

In December 2023, the series was canceled after one season.

== Synopsis ==
Stephen Richards, a self-made man, has built a cosmetics empire and become a strong advocate for Black-owned businesses. After he has a heart attack, there is a fight for control over his empire. His family's secrets come to the forefront, and the lives of his children from his two marriages begin to collide.

== Cast ==
- Deborah Ayorinde as Nina Richards
- Hugh Quarshie as Stephen Richards
- Sarah Niles as Claudia Richards
- Brendan Coyle as Gideon Havelock
- Hermione Norris as Maureen Dawson
- Adeyinka Akinrinade as Alesha Richards
- Ola Orebiyi as Gus Richards
- C.J. Beckford as Andre Scott-Clarke
- Nneka Okoye as Wanda Richards
- Emmanuel Imani as Simon Richards
- Liran Nathan as Ido
- Jourdan Dunn as Davina Chase

== Episodes ==
No.	Title	Directed by	Written by	Original release date
1	"See Trouble Coming"	Sebastian Thiel	Abby Ajayi	2 December 2022
2	"Wrong and Strong"	Sebastian Thiel	Abby Ajayi	2 December 2022
3	"Black on Both Sides"	Darcia Martin	Abby Ajayi	2 December 2022
4	"The Master's Tools"	Abby Ajayi	Abby Ajayi, Tumi Belo	2 December 2022
5	"What Needs to Be Done"	Darcia Martin	Abby Ajayi	2 December 2022
6	"Forgive, Maybe. Forget, Never."	Darcia Martin	Abby Ajayi	2 December 2022

== Production ==
On 15 October 2020, it was announced that ITV had commissioned Greenacre Films to make a six-part series about a wealthy family dealing with a tragic event, created, written, and executive produced by Abby Ajayi. It is executive produced by Nadine Marsh-Edwards and Amanda Jenks of Greenacre, and Alison Owen and Alison Carpenter of Monumental Television, and produced by Yvonne Francas.

On 11 November 2021, it was reported that Deborah Ayorinde and Hugh Quarshie had been cast as series leads, and that Sarah Niles, Brendan Coyle, Hermione Norris, Adeyinka Akinrinade, Ola Orebiyi, C.J. Beckford, Nneka Okoye, and Emmanuel Imani had also been cast.

Principal photography commenced in London in November 2021. It was also filmed in New York.

In December 2023, it was announced that a second series would not be produced.

== Release ==
All six episodes of the series premiered on Prime Video on 2 December 2022, in the US, Canada, Australia, New Zealand, Nordics, and Sub-Saharan Africa, and on ITVX in the UK on 22 December 2022. Banijay handled worldwide distribution. It received a linear television broadcast on ITV on 30 June 2023.
