= Ali Hughes =

British screenwriter and director

- Citizenship: British
- Education: MetFilm School (MA in Screenwriting)
- Occupations: Screenwriter; director; producer; editor
- Known for: Dreaming Whilst Black

Ali Hughes is a British screenwriter and director, best known as the co-writer of the BAFTA-nominated comedy series Dreaming Whilst Black, for which he was nominated for a BAFTA and International Emmy Award.

== Early life ==
Hughes studied screenwriting at the MetFilm School, where he completed a Master of Arts degree. After his graduation in 2014, Ali spent some years working warehouse shifts, delivering wine and working at primary schools, before earning his first BBC commission for the Dreaming Whilst Black Pilot in 2019.

== Career ==
Hughes began his career writing for web series and short films. His feature script Mignonette was a finalist at the 2017 London Film Awards. His major television work is co-writing the comedy series Dreaming Whilst Black with Adjani Salmon. The project originated at MetFilm School and was first released as a web series in 2018. It was later developed into a pilot for BBC Three in 2021 and a full television series in 2023, which was co-produced by A24 and Big Deal Films. Hughes served as a co-writer and executive producer on the series. The first series received a positive critical reception. A second series aired in 2024.

His earlier short film writing credits include The Job (2015) and A Fistful of Candy (2016).

== Filmography ==
=== Writer ===
Year	Title	Notes
2015	The Job	Short film
2016	A Fistful of Candy	Short film
2018	Dreaming Whilst Black (TV mini-series)	6 episodes, co-writer
2021	Dreaming Whilst Black (TV pilot)	Co-writer
2023	Dreaming Whilst Black (Season 2)	6 episodes, co-writer
2024	Dreaming Whilst Black (Season 2)	Writer (episodes 3 & 5)

=== Other credits ===
- Dreaming Whilst Black (2018): Director (Episode 6), Editor (Episode 4), Producer (Episode 2)
- Dreaming Whilst Black (2021–2023): Actor (Barman, 7 episodes)
- Dreaming Whilst Black (2023–2024): Executive producer

== Awards and nominations ==
Year	Award	Category	Work	Result
2017	London Film Awards	Feature Script	style="background: #FFE3E3; color: black; vertical-align: middle; text-align: center; " class="no table-no2 notheme"|Finalist	
2018	Web Series Awards	Various	style="background: #9EFF9E; color: #000; vertical-align: middle; text-align: center; " class="yes table-yes2 notheme"|Nominated for over 20 awards, won 6	
2024	Broadcast Awards	International Programme	Dreaming Whilst Black| style="background: #9EFF9E; color: #000; vertical-align: middle; text-align: center; " class="yes table-yes2 notheme"|Won	
2024	BAFTA Television Awards	Scripted Comedy	Dreaming Whilst Black| style="background: #FFE3E3; color: black; vertical-align: middle; text-align: center; " class="no table-no2 notheme"|Nominated	
2024	Broadcasting Press Guild Awards	Best Comedy	Dreaming Whilst Black| style="background: #FFE3E3; color: black; vertical-align: middle; text-align: center; " class="no table-no2 notheme"|Nominated	
