= I May Destroy You =

British black comedy drama television series

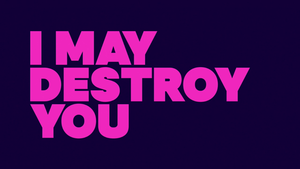
- Genre: Psychological drama; Black comedy; Tragicomedy
- Created by: Michaela Coel
- Written by: Michaela Coel
- Directed by: Sam Miller; Michaela Coel
- Starring: Michaela Coel; Weruche Opia; Paapa Essiedu
- Music by: Raffertie
- Countries of origin: United Kingdom; United States
- Original language: English (Note: With some dialogue in Italian and Twi)
- No. of series: 1
- No. of episodes: 12

Production
- Executive producers: Michaela Coel; Phil Clarke; Roberto Troni; Sam Miller; Jo McLellan
- Producers: Simon Meyers; Simon Maloney
- Production locations: London, England; Ostia, Italy
- Cinematography: Adam Gillham
- Editors: Christian Sandino-Taylor; Lindsey Woodward; Mike Phillips; Guy Bensley; John Dwelly; Amy Hounsell
- Camera setup: Single-camera
- Running time: 28–35 minutes
- Production companies: Various Artists Limited; FALKNA Productions

Original release
- Network: BBC One (UK); HBO (US)
- Release: 7 June – 14 July 2020

I May Destroy You is a British black comedy drama television series created, written, co-directed, and executive produced by Michaela Coel for BBC One and HBO. The series is set in London with a predominantly Black British cast. Coel stars as Arabella, a young writer in the public eye who seeks to rebuild her life after being raped, with co-stars Weruche Opia as Terry and Paapa Essiedu as Kwame, her two best friends. The series premiered on 7 June 2020 on HBO and on 8 June 2020 on BBC One.

I May Destroy You received rave reviews; it was hailed as a masterpiece upon release and was quickly named one of the greatest television series of all time. Its writing, direction, editing, soundtrack, and the performances of the lead trio were all acclaimed by critics. The series won the BAFTA TV Awards for Best Mini-Series, Best Actress, Best Director: Drama, Best Writer: Drama and Best Editing: Fiction. At the 73rd Primetime Emmy Awards, the series received nine nominations including Outstanding Limited or Anthology Series; it won two awards including Outstanding Writing for Coel, making her the first black woman to win the award in the category.

== Premise ==
Arabella is a young Twitter-star-turned-novelist in her late twenties living in London. She has found fame with her debut book Chronicles of a Fed-Up Millennial, and is publicly celebrated as a Millennial icon. While struggling to meet a deadline for her second book, she takes a break from work to meet up with friends on a night out. The following morning, she struggles to remember what happened to her, but recalls the events of the night with the help of her friends Terry and Kwame.

== Cast and characters ==
The cast consists of mostly Black British actors. They include:

=== Main ===
- Michaela Coel as Arabella Essiedu, a writer
- Weruche Opia as Terry Pratchard, Arabella's best friend and a struggling actor
- Paapa Essiedu as Kwame, Arabella's best friend

=== Recurring ===
- Marouane Zotti as Biagio, a drug dealer based in Ostia, Italy, who has a casual relationship with Arabella
- Stephen Wight as Ben, Arabella's flatmate
- Adam James as Julian, Arabella's literary agent
- Natalie Walter as Francine, Arabella's financier
- Aml Ameen as Simon, Arabella's friend who works in the City of London
- Lara Rossi as Kat, Simon's partner
- Ann Akin as Alissa, Simon's secret lover
- Chin Nyenwe as Tariq, David's friend
- Lewis Reeves as David, from Ego Death
- Sarah Niles as Officer Funmi
- Mariah Gale as Officer Beth
- Rebecca Calder as Shirley, a rape victim who meets Arabella at the hospital
- Andi Osho as Carrie, Arabella's therapist
- Fehinti Balogun as Damon, Kwame's love interest
- Karan Gill as Zain Sareen, writer from Henny publishing
- Samson Ajewole as Malik, Kwame's hookup
- Tobi King Bakare as Nicholas, Arabella's brother
- Ellie James as Sion, Susy's assistant
- Franc Ashman as Susy Henny, Arabella's publisher
- Harriet Webb as Theodora, Arabella and Terry's childhood classmate
- Shalisha James-Davis as Loretta, a member of Theodora's support group
- Gaby French as teen Theodora
- Danielle Vitalis as teen Arabella
- Lauren-Joy Williams as teen Terry
- Pearl Chanda as Nilufer, Kwame's first female hookup
- Gershwyn Eustache Jnr as Tyrone, one of Kwame's hookups
- Tyler Luke Cunningham as Kai, Terry's love interest

=== Notable guests ===
- Katherine Jakeways as Jacki
- Juno Dawson as Scarlett
- Kadiff Kirwan as Officer Tom
- Antonia Clarke as Emily
- Vivian Oparah as Bisola
- Jonathan Slinger as doctor

== Episodes ==
I May Destroy You, season 1 episodes
No.	Title	Directed by	Written by	Original release date	US airdate	US viewers (millions)
1	"Eyes Eyes Eyes Eyes"	Sam Miller	Michaela Coel	8 June 2020	7 June 2020	0.212
Arabella is on a deadline to finish her second book. She decides to take a break by going for a drink with friends. At some point during the night, she is raped in a bar toilet.
2	"Someone Is Lying"	Sam Miller	Michaela Coel	9 June 2020 (Note: "Someone Is Lying" was first released on BBC iPlayer on 8 June 2020, ahead of its broadcast on television.)	14 June 2020	0.229
Arabella suffers from memory flashes due to the trauma from the rape. While helping Terry with an audition, she tries to remember how her phone got smashed. She decided to go to Simon's place and question him only to get evasive answers. Trying to trace back the route using Simon's Uber receipts, she ends up at Alissa's place who confesses to being Simon's secret lover. Arabella goes to the police to report her assault with Kwame for company.
3	"Don't Forget the Sea"	Sam Miller	Michaela Coel	15 June 2020 (Note: "Don't Forget the Sea" and "That Was Fun" were first released on BBC iPlayer on 15 June 2020, ahead of their broadcast on television.)	22 June 2020	0.156
A flashback to Ostia, Italy where Arabella and Terry have a wild night out, meeting local man Biagio.
4	"That Was Fun"	Sam Miller & Michaela Coel	Michaela Coel	16 June 2020	29 June 2020	0.098
Arabella becomes close with fellow writer Zain. They later have sex and he removes the condom without her knowledge. Meanwhile, Kwame and Damon visit a man from Grindr, and this encounter turns violent after Damon leaves.
5	"...It Just Came Up"	Sam Miller & Michaela Coel	Michaela Coel	22 June 2020 (Note: "...It Just Came Up" and "The Alliance" were first released on BBC iPlayer on 22 June 2020, ahead of their broadcast on television.)	6 July 2020	0.108
Arabella exposes Zain's actions at a literary festival. Kwame goes to the police about his attack but is not taken seriously.
6	"The Alliance"	Sam Miller & Michaela Coel	Michaela Coel	23 June 2020	13 July 2020	0.128
Arabella attends a support group hosted by Theodora, who was at school with her and Terry. In a flashback to the mid-2000s, Theo accuses classmate Ryan of violent rape, but Arabella and Terry provide evidence to the teachers that her story is not entirely true.
7	"Happy Animals"	Sam Miller & Michaela Coel	Michaela Coel	29 June 2020 (Note: "Happy Animals" and "Line Spectrum Border" were first released on BBC iPlayer on 29 June 2020, ahead of their broadcast on television.)	20 July 2020	0.102
Arabella becomes an influencer for a vegan brand, and hosts a birthday party for Terry. At the party she attempts to matchmake Kwame with another man by locking them in her bedroom. There is tension between Theo and Terry.
8	"Line Spectrum Border"	Sam Miller & Michaela Coel	Michaela Coel	30 June 2020	27 July 2020	0.087
After the police close the investigation, Arabella makes a surprise visit to Biagio who refuses to see her. Kwame hooks up with a woman (Nilufer) but it ends badly when he reveals he is gay.
9	"Social Media Is a Great Way to Connect"	Sam Miller & Michaela Coel	Michaela Coel	6 July 2020 (Note: "Social Media Is a Great Way to Connect" and "The Cause the Cure" were first released on BBC iPlayer on 6 July 2020, ahead of their broadcast on television.)	3 August 2020	0.088
It is Halloween. Arabella's increasing social media presence drives a wedge between her and her friends.
10	"The Cause the Cure"	Sam Miller & Michaela Coel	Michaela Coel	7 July 2020	10 August 2020	0.115
Arabella's family meet up for her mum's birthday, prompting memories of her childhood spent between two parental homes. Meanwhile, Kwame meets Tyrone in an attempted hookup, but instead their relationship becomes more romantic.
11	"Would You Like to Know the Sex?"	Sam Miller & Michaela Coel	Michaela Coel	13 July 2020 (Note: "Would You Like to Know the Sex?" and "Ego Death" were first released on BBC iPlayer on 13 July 2020, ahead of their broadcast on television.)	17 August 2020	0.088
Arabella's publishers drop her book as she has still not finished it, after she had reached out to successful author "Della" signed to the same publisher. It transpires that Della is a pseudonym used by Zain, who offers to help Arabella with her writing. Terry finally gets an acting part and goes on a date with Kai, a trans man.
12	"Ego Death"	Sam Miller & Michaela Coel	Michaela Coel	14 July 2020	24 August 2020	0.121
Arabella imagines multiple ways in which she and Terry could exact revenge on her rapist, but ultimately decides to move on. She uses these thoughts to finally complete her second book, and the episode concludes at her launch party.

== Release ==
The series premiered on 7 June 2020 on HBO and HBO Max in the United States, and on 8 June 2020 on BBC One in the UK.

== Production ==
Coel stated in a lecture at the 2018 Edinburgh Festival Fringe that she had been sexually assaulted while writing Chewing Gum, and that the experience provided inspiration for the series.

Originally titled 22 January, the series is produced by Coel's production company, FALKNA Productions. It is executive produced by Coel, Phil Clarke, Roberto Troni, and Jo McClellan for BBC One. Coel is also co-director and writer for I May Destroy You. Coel turned down a $1 million (£800,000) offer from Netflix for the show because the deal would have taken full rights ownership away from the creator. Coel subsequently made a deal with the BBC which allowed Coel full creative control and ownership rights of her project and the BBC brought on HBO as a co-producer to help fund the project.

The series was predominantly filmed in the London Borough of Hackney, with some scenes filmed in Italy. School interior and exteriors for the flashback scenes were shot at Acland Burghley School in the Camden.

== Reception ==
=== Critical response ===
I May Destroy You holds an average score of 86 out of 100 based on reviews from 25 critics on review aggregator Metacritic, indicating "universal acclaim". On Rotten Tomatoes, 97% of 72 reviews are positive, with an average score of 8.55/10. The website's critical consensus is, "I May Destroy You is at once brave and delicate, untangling the trauma of sexual assault with dark humour and moments of deep discomfort all held together on the strength of Michaela Coel's undeniable talent." I May Destroy You has been considered by multiple publications to be one of the greatest television series of all time. (Note: Attributed to multiple sources.)

Writing for The New York Times, critic Mike Hale called the series "touching and quietly hilarious." He praised Coel and the show's willingness to push boundaries. Carina Chocano, also writing in The New York Times, described the series as "the perfect show for an anxious world." In her review for Time, critic Judy Berman noted the show's unique and complex telling of a story centred on sexual assault after the Me Too movement.

=== Awards and nominations ===
Year	Award	Category	Nominee(s)	Result	Ref.
2020	RTS Craft & Design Awards	Costume Design - Drama	Lynsey Moore	Won	
2020	RTS Craft & Design Awards	Director - Drama	Sam Miller, Michaela Coel	Nominated	
2020	RTS Craft & Design Awards	Make Up Design - Drama	Bethany Swan	Nominated	
2020	RTS Craft & Design Awards	RTS Special Award	I May Destroy You	Won	
2021	British Academy Television Awards	Best Mini-Series	I May Destroy You	Won	
2021	British Academy Television Awards	Best Actor	Paapa Essiedu	Nominated	
2021	British Academy Television Awards	Best Actress	Michaela Coel	Won	
2021	British Academy Television Awards	Best Supporting Actress	Weruche Opia	Nominated	
2021	British Academy Television Craft Awards	Best Director: Fiction	Michaela Coel and Sam Miller	Won	
2021	British Academy Television Craft Awards	Best Editing: Fiction	Editing Team	Won	
2021	British Academy Television Craft Awards	Best Make Up & Hair Design	Bethany Swan	Nominated	
2021	British Academy Television Craft Awards	Best Writer: Drama	Michaela Coel	Won	
2021	Costume Designers Guild Awards	Excellence in Contemporary Television	Lynsey Moore (for "Social Media is a Great Way to Connect")	Nominated	
2021	Critics' Choice Television Awards	Best Limited Series	I May Destroy You	Nominated	
2021	Critics' Choice Television Awards	Best Actress in a Limited Series or Television Movie	Michaela Coel	Nominated	
2021	GLAAD Media Awards	Outstanding Limited or Anthology Series	I May Destroy You	Won	
2021	Gotham Independent Film Awards	Breakthrough Series – Short Form	Michaela Coel, Phil Clarke and Roberto Troni	Won	
2021	Hollywood Critics Association TV Awards	Best Broadcast Network or Cable Limited Series, Anthology Series or Live-Action Television Movie	I May Destroy You	Nominated	
2021	Hollywood Critics Association TV Awards	Best Actress in a Limited Series, Anthology Series or Television Movie	Michaela Coel	Nominated	
2021	Independent Spirit Awards	Best New Scripted Series	Michaela Coel, Phil Clarke and Roberto Troni	Won	
2021	Independent Spirit Awards	Best Ensemble Cast in a New Scripted Series	Michaela Coel, Paapa Essiedu, Weruche Opia and Stephen Wight	Won	
2021	Motion Picture Sound Editors Awards	Outstanding Achievement in Sound Editing – Live Action Under 35 Minutes	Jim Goddard, Joe Beal, Tom Deane, Alex Sidiropoulos and Anna Wright (for "Eyes Eyes Eyes Eyes")	Nominated	
2021	MTV Movie & TV Awards	Best Performance in a Show	Michaela Coel	Nominated	
2021	NAACP Image Awards	Outstanding Actress in a Television Movie, Mini-Series or Dramatic Special	Michaela Coel	Nominated	
2021	NAACP Image Awards	Outstanding Directing in a Comedy Series	Sam Miller and Michaela Coel (for "Ego Death")	Nominated	
2021	NAACP Image Awards	Outstanding Writing in a Comedy Series	Michaela Coel (for "Ego Death")	Won	
2021	Primetime Emmy Awards	Outstanding Limited or Anthology Series	Michaela Coel, Phil Clarke, Roberto Troni, Simon Meyers and Simon Maloney	Nominated	
2021	Primetime Emmy Awards	Outstanding Lead Actress in a Limited or Anthology Series or Movie	Michaela Coel	Nominated	
2021	Primetime Emmy Awards	Outstanding Supporting Actor in a Limited or Anthology Series or Movie	Paapa Essiedu (for "That Was Fun")	Nominated	
2021	Primetime Emmy Awards	Outstanding Directing for a Limited or Anthology Series or Movie	Sam Miller and Michaela Coel (for "Ego Death")	Nominated	
2021	Primetime Emmy Awards	Outstanding Directing for a Limited or Anthology Series or Movie	Sam Miller (for "Eyes Eyes Eyes Eyes")	Nominated	
2021	Primetime Emmy Awards	Outstanding Writing for a Limited or Anthology Series or Movie	Michaela Coel	Won	
2021	Primetime Creative Arts Emmy Awards	Outstanding Casting for a Limited or Anthology Series or Movie	Julie Harkin	Nominated	
2021	Primetime Creative Arts Emmy Awards	Outstanding Contemporary Costumes	Lynsey Moore, Rosie Lack and Debbie Roberts (for "Social Media is a Great Way to Connect")	Nominated	
2021	Primetime Creative Arts Emmy Awards	Outstanding Music Supervision	Ciara Elwis and Matt Biffa (for "Ego Death")	Won	
2021	Producers Guild of America Awards	David L. Wolper Award for Outstanding Producer of Limited Series Television	Michaela Coel, Phil Clarke, Roberto Troni, Simon Meyers and Simon Maloney	Nominated	
2021	RTS Programme Awards	Mini-Series	I May Destroy You	Won	
2021	RTS Programme Awards	Actor – Female	Michaela Coel	Won	
2021	RTS Programme Awards	Writer – Drama	Michaela Coel	Won	
2021	Screen Actors Guild Awards	Outstanding Performance by a Female Actor in a Television Movie or Limited Series	Michaela Coel	Nominated	
2021	Television Critics Association Awards	Program of the Year	I May Destroy You	Nominated	
2021	Television Critics Association Awards	Outstanding Achievement in Movies, Miniseries and Specials	I May Destroy You	Nominated	
2021	Television Critics Association Awards	Outstanding New Program	I May Destroy You	Nominated	
2021	Television Critics Association Awards	Individual Achievement in Drama	Michaela Coel	Won	

== See also ==
- List of Primetime Emmy Awards received by HBO
