= Abby Ajayi =

British screenwriter

Abby Ajayi is a British television screenwriter.

== Early life ==
Ajayi was born in London to Nigerian parents. She studied law at Wadham College, Oxford and was the recipient of a Fulbright scholarship to study screenwriting in New York.

== Career ==
Ajayi began her career in the UK writing on television shows including EastEnders, Hollyoaks, and Casualty. In the US, Ajayi has worked as a writer-producer on Four Weddings and a Funeral, The First Lady, Inventing Anna, and How to Get Away With Murder. She was nominated for an Emmy Award for her work on Inventing Anna.

In 2020, she was selected by Drama Quarterly as one of its "Writers to Watch". In March 2023, Ajayi was featured in Variety's "International Women of Impact Report".

Ajayi also writes fiction and she has been published in the literary magazine Callaloo.

In 2021, Ajayi wrote and directed the drama series Riches for ITV and Amazon which began filming in 2021. The series was broadcast in late 2022.
