= Sean Sagar =

British actor (born 1990)

- Born: 20 February 1990 (age 36); London, England
- Occupation: Actor
- Years active: 2011–present
- Relatives: Nick Sagar (brother)

Sean Sagar (born 20 February 1990) is a British actor and model. He began his career appearing on British television before roles in films Blue Story (2019), Guy Ritchie's The Covenant (2023) and Mea Culpa (2024). In 2023, Sagar began starring in the Paramount+ series, NCIS: Sydney.

== Early life ==
Sean Sagar was born and raised in East London, England. He is of Jamaican and Guyanese descent. Sagar's older brother, Nick, is also an actor. One of his childhood friends is the rapper and actor Plan B.

== Career ==
Sagar made his film debut appearing in the 2012 crime drama Ill Manors directed by Plan B. As a model, Sagar worked with brands such as Hugo Boss, Topman, Theory, Paul Smith, Fenwick, Everlast and Adidas. On television, Sagar appeared in Casualty, Top Boy, Trollied and Just a Couple. From 2016 to 2020, he starred in the BBC One military drama series, Our Girl. In 2019, he appeared in the musical film Blue Story and had a minor role in the crime film, The Gentlemen. From 2021 to 2022, he had the recurring role of Marco in the Netflix teen drama series, Fate: The Winx Saga.

In 2023, Sagar starred in the action film Guy Ritchie's The Covenant. Later that year, Sagar made his American television debut starring during the sixth season of the BET comedy-drama series, Sistas. He was replaced by Devin Way for season 7. Later in 2023, Sagar began starring in the Paramount+ series, NCIS: Sydney. In 2024, he starred in the erotic thriller film, Mea Culpa, by Tyler Perry.

On stage, Sagar was in the stage adaptation of The Loneliness of the Long-Distance Runner (York Theatre Royal and UK tour, 2012) as well as a modern adaptation of Antigone (Derby Theatre and UK tour, 2014-15), both written by Roy Williams and produced by Pilot Theatre.

Sagar in The Loneliness of the Long Distance Runner (2012)

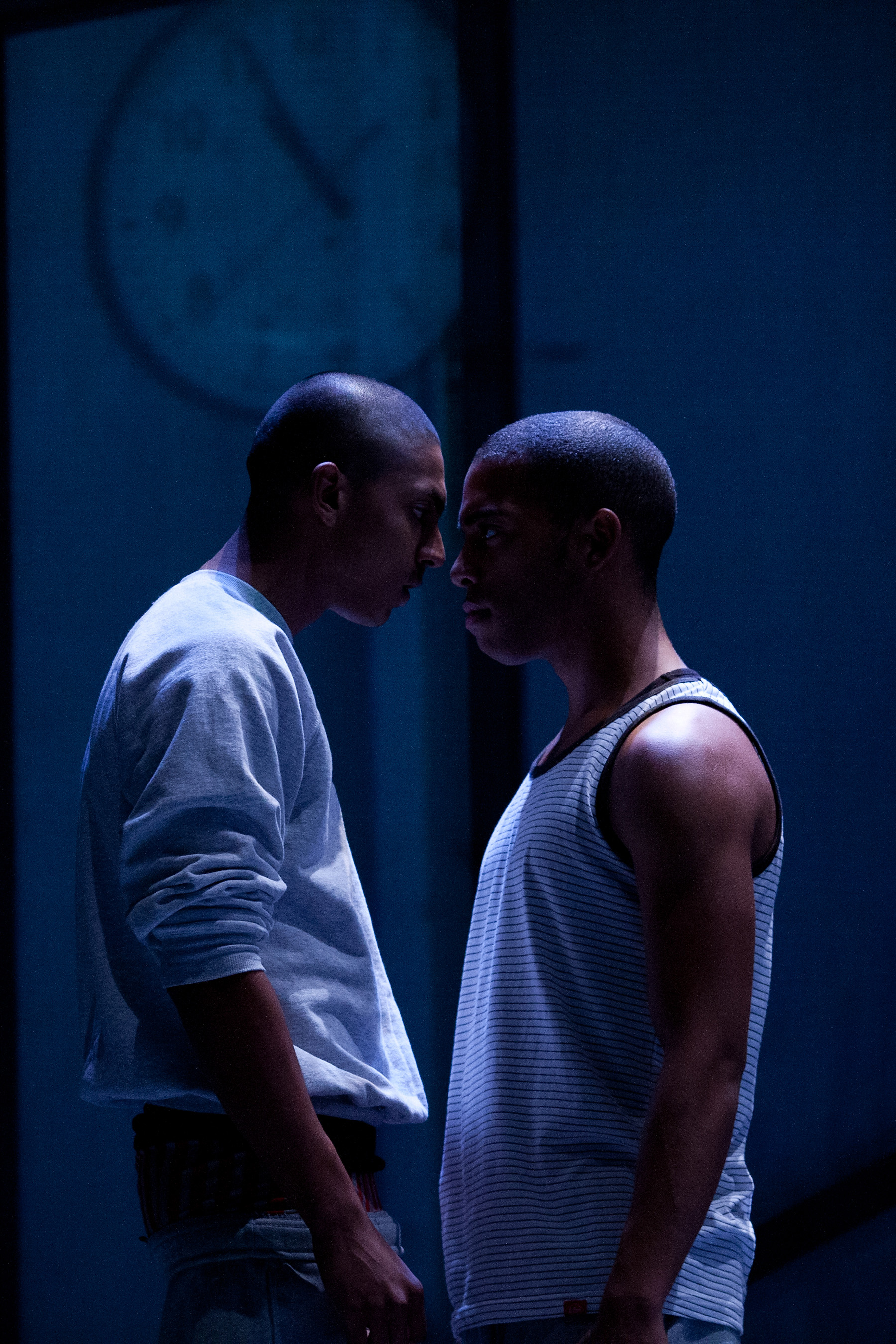
Sagar (left) as Asher, opposite the protagonist Colin Smith (right; played by Elliot Barnes-Worrell)

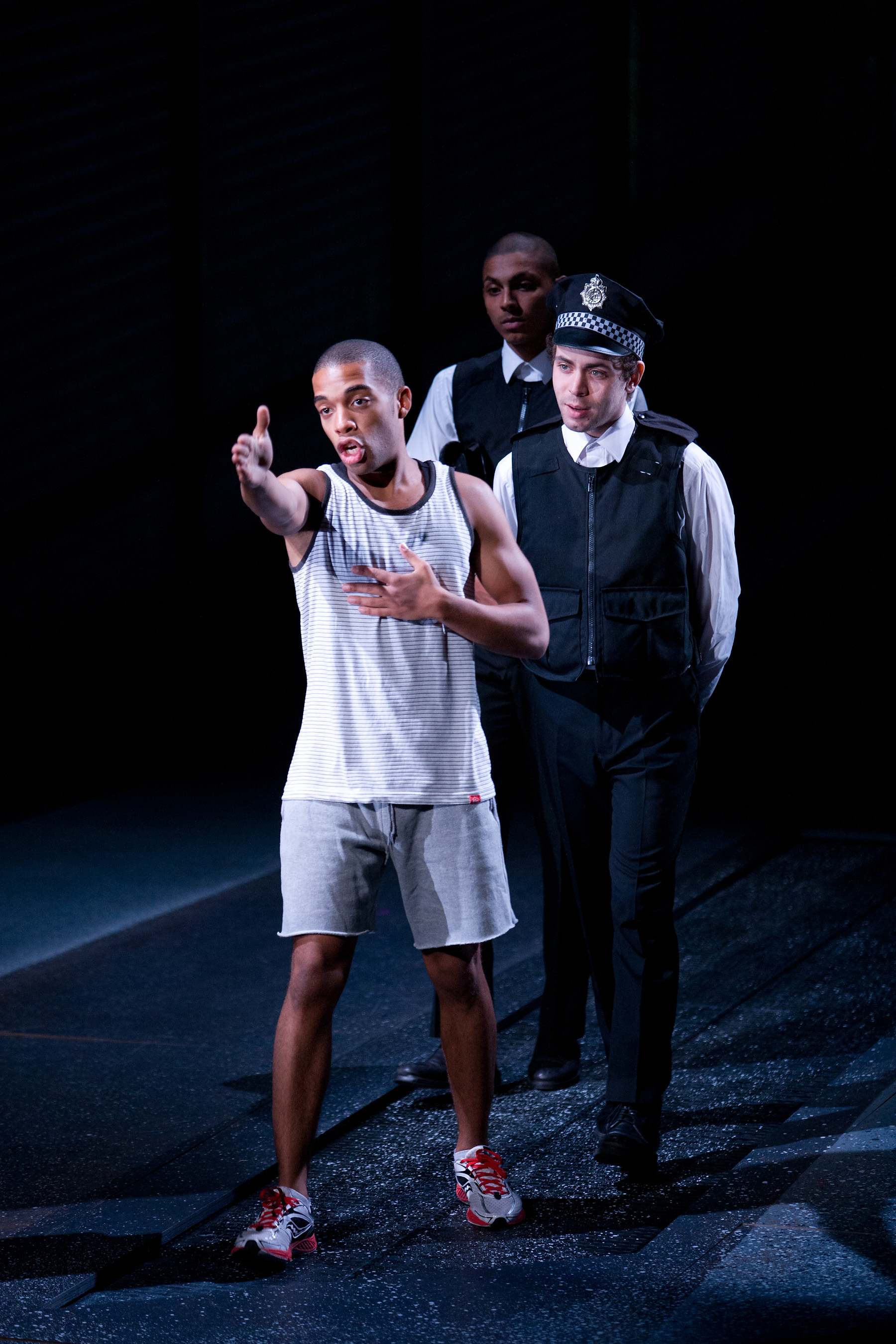
Sagar (back) also played the role of a police officer, pictured alongside fellow cast members Barnes-Worrell (front) and Curtis Cole (middle; also a police officer)

== Personal life ==
Sagar previously dated then-Little Mix member Jesy Nelson between 2020 and 2021.

== Filmography ==
=== Film ===
Year	Title	Role	Notes
2012	Friend Request	Zachary	Short film
2012	Ill Manors	Freddie	
2014	We Are Monster	Derrick James	
2014	Daytimer	Saf	
2019	Blue Story	Skitzer	
2019	The Gentlemen	Mal	
2020	Solitaire	Jamal	Short film
2023	Guy Ritchie's The Covenant	Charlie "Jizzy" Crow	
2024	Mea Culpa	Kal Hawthorne	

=== Television ===
Year	Title	Role	Notes
2011	Top Boy	Tareek	3 episodes
2012	Casualty	Saf Hussein	Episode: "Teenage Dreams"
2013	Trollied	MC Poison	3 episodes
2016	Casualty	Zeke Tanner	Episode: "A Clear Conscience"
2016–2020	Our Girl	Private Jaiden "Monk" Montgomery	Series regular, 20 episodes
2017	Just a Couple	Daniel	Series regular, 6 episodes
2019	Sticks and Stones	Andy	Miniseries
2021–2022	Fate: The Winx Saga	Marco	6 episodes
2021–2023	Buffering	Robbie	5 episodes
2023	Sistas	Jordan	Series regular (season 6)
2023–present	NCIS: Sydney	DeShawn Jackson	Main role
