= Just a Couple =

British comedy television series

- Genre: Comedy drama
- Created by: Sebastian Thiel
- Directed by: Sebastian Thiel
- Starring: Frieda Thiel; Michael Salami; Weruche Opia; Sean Sagar
- Country of origin: United Kingdom
- No. of episodes: 6

Production
- Producer: Lara Singer
- Camera setup: Single-camera
- Production company: Big Talk Productions

Original release
- Network: BBC Three
- Release: 9 March – 13 April 2017

Just a couple is a British television comedy-drama created by Sebastian Thiel. Originally pitched by Upshot Entertainment in 2013, it was then further developed by Big Talk Productions in 2016.

The show explores the trials and tribulations of a millennial couple's relationship, through comedy. The series routes itself within the small details of what it's really like to be in a relationship. Episodes explore things like, the act of betraying your partner by finishing a Netflix series - when you promised to watch it together.

Just a Couple premiered on BBC Three on 9 March 2017. The show stars Frieda Thiel, Sebastian Thiel's younger sister, Michael Salami, Weruche Opia and Sean Sagar.

In 2018, Just a Couple won Favourite Comedy Production at the Screen Nation Awards and Debut Writer Award at The Debbies

== Cast ==
- Frieda Thiel as Shavon
- Michael Salami as Mark
- Weruche Opia as Melissa
- Sean Sagar as Daniel
