= Shannon Thornton =

American actress (born 1987)

- Born: July 24, 1987 (age 39); Connecticut, U.S.
- Occupation: Actress
- Years active: 2010–present
- Known for: P-Valley

Shannon Thornton (born July 24, 1987) is an American actress best known for her role as Keyshawn on the Starz series P-Valley (2020–present). She won a Gracie Allen Award and a Women's Image Network Award for her performance.

== Life and career ==
Thornton was born and raised in Connecticut. She has modeled for Creme of Nature and other Black hair care products.

Thornton's first television acting role was on Blue Bloods in 2010. She also had recurring roles on Rise, Dynasty, and Power. In 2020, she gained wider prominence as a lead cast member on the Starz drama series P-Valley, on which she portrays Keyshawn, a stripper in an abusive relationship. In 2022, she appeared in Future's music video "Love You Better."

In 2024, Thornton appeared in the erotic thriller film Mea Culpa and later played the lead in the romantic drama film Finding Joy, both directed by Tyler Perry.

== Filmography ==
=== Film ===
Year	Title	Role	Notes
2018	The Week Of	Daray	
2021	Wouldn't Mean Nuthin'	Nicole	Short
2024	Mea Culpa	Charlise	
2025	Finding Joy	Joy	

=== Television ===
Year	Title	Role	Notes
2010	Blue Bloods	Sara	Episode: "Smack Attack"
2016	Law & Order: Special Victims Unit	Ashley S.	Episode: "Assaulting Reality"
2017	Time After Time	Kerry Ann Riley	Episode: "Pilot"
2018	Rise	Yvonne Thorne	Recurring cast
2018	Power	Quinn Phillips	Recurring cast: Season 5
2018	FBI	Jill Frey	Episode: "Cops and Robbers"
2020–2021	Dynasty	Mia	Recurring cast: Season 3-4
2020–present	P-Valley	Keyshawn Harris	Main cast
2022	Inventing Anna	Natasha Lucas	Episode: "Dangerously Close"

=== Music Videos ===
Year	Artist	Song	Notes
2022	Future	"Love You Better"	Female Lead

== Awards and nominations ==
=== For P-Valley ===
- 2021 – Winner, Gracie Allen Award, Actress in a Supporting Role - Drama
- 2022 – Winner, Women's Image Network Award for Best Actress, Drama Series (for "White Knights")
