= Sarah Niles =

English actress

- Born: Thornton Heath, London, England
- Education: Manchester School of Theatre
- Occupation: Actress

Sarah Niles is an English actress. She became widely known for her performance as Dr. Sharon Fieldstone in the Apple+ series Ted Lasso, for which she received two Emmy Award nominations. She has also appeared in Beautiful People (2009), Spotless (2015), Catastrophe (2015–2019), I May Destroy You and Trying (2020), Viewpoint (2021), Riches and The Sandman in 2022, The Loud House and its film No Time to Spy (2024–2025), among others.

== Early life and education ==
Niles was born in Thornton Heath, South London, the youngest daughter of three to her father, an electrician, and her mother, a care nurse, both Bajans who arrived in Britain in the late 1950s.

She was a drama student at the Manchester School of Theatre, part of the Manchester Metropolitan University.

== Career ==
=== Stage ===
Niles has appeared in many theatre productions, including shows at the National Theatre, the Royal Court Theatre, The Old Vic, and The Bush Theatre.

In 2013 and 2014, she worked with the Royal Shakespeare Company as Charmian in Antony and Cleopatra, performing at Stratford Upon Avon and touring to Miami and The Public Theater in New York City. In the same year she played Tituba in a sold-out production of The Crucible at The Old Vic, which was streamed to cinemas throughout the UK and internationally. In 2017, she appeared as Carmen in Guillermo Calderón's play B at the Royal Court alongside Paul Kaye, Aimee-Ffion Edwards, and Danusia Samal. Niles played the role of Enid in the 2018 revival of Leave Taking by Winsome Pinnock at the Bush Theatre.

=== Screen ===
On the big screen, Niles appeared in Mike Leigh's Happy-Go-Lucky (2008), London Boulevard, and Austenland.

She co-starred in the BBC TV comedy series Beautiful People alongside Olivia Colman. She has also had roles in various other high-profile comedy television shows, appearing opposite Sharon Horgan and American comedian Rob Delaney in Catastrophe and Jason Sudeikis in the second and third seasons of Ted Lasso. For the latter she won the Screen Actors Guild Award for Outstanding Performance by an Ensemble in a Comedy Series along with the cast of the series, and also received two Emmy nominations: for Outstanding Supporting Actress in a Comedy Series in 2022 and Outstanding Guest Actress in a Comedy Series in 2023.

She appeared in Sarah Gavron's award-winning film Rocks, Michaela Coel's I May Destroy You, and Netflix's The Sandman.

Niles also voiced the spy boss X in The Loud House franchise film No Time to Spy and also reprised her role in the main series episode "Europe Road Trip: A Knight to Remember".

She also featured in the Marvel Studios film The Fantastic Four: First Steps.

== Filmography ==
=== Film ===
Key
†	Denotes films that have not yet been released

Year	Title	Role	Notes
1999	Station	Girlfriend	Short
2008	Happy-Go-Lucky	Tash	
2010	London Boulevard	Hospital Matron	
2012	Now Is Good	Nurse #2	
2013	Austenland	Delilah	
2014	Cuban Fury	Salsa Pupil	
2014	The Crucible	Tituba	
2014	Still	Headmistress M. Jones	
2019	Rocks	Ms. Booker	
2020	Richard II	Bolingbroke	
2020	National Theatre Live: Three Sisters	Lolo	
2021	Guide Me Home	Michelle	Short
2022	This Is Christmas	Judith	
2023	The Toxic Avenger	Mayor Togar	
2024	No Time to Spy	X (voice)	
2025	F1	Bernadette Pearce	
2025	Heads of State	Simone Bradshaw	
2025	The Fantastic Four: First Steps	Lynne Nichols	

=== Television ===
Year	Title	Role	Notes
1999	A Touch of Frost	WPC #1	Episode: "Line of Fire: Part 1"
2008	Doctor Who	Node 1	Episode: "Silence in the Library"
2008	Peep Show	Cashier	Episode: "Jeremy's Broke"
2008–2009	Beautiful People	Reba	10 episodes
2009	Mister Eleven	Audrey	2 episodes
2010	Thorne: Sleepyhead	Maggie Byrne	3 episodes: "Sleepyhead" 1, 2, 3
2011	Being Human	Dr. Hayley Hamilton	Episode: "Though the Heavens Fall"
2014	Death in Paradise	Sylvaine Dor	Episode: "Rue Morgue"
2014	Waterloo Road	Cecile Tsibi	2 episodes: "Dynasty's Choice", "A Bolt from the Blue"
2015	Don't Take My Baby	Claire	TV film
2015	Spotless	DCI Diane Squire	3 episodes: "Say What You See", "Fallowfield", "DCI Diane Squire"
2015–2019	Catastrophe	Melissa	8 episodes
2016	Marley's Ghosts	Sue	Episode: "Fit"
2016	Stan Lee's Lucky Man	Nurse Aboko	Episode: "A Twist of Fate"
2017	Holby City	Miriam 'Mim' Sugarman	Episode: "The Hard Way Home"
2018	Moving On	Debs	Episode: "Two Fat Ladies"
2019	Trust Me	Stella McCain	2 episodes
2020	I May Destroy You	Officer Funmi	3 episodes: "Line Spectrum Border", "It Just Came Up", "Officer Funmi"
2020	Trying	Alisha	2 episodes: "Show Me the Love" and "Tickets for a Queue"
2020	Dracula	Meg	Episode: "The Dark Compass"
2021	Danny Boy	Stella Marshall	TV film
2021	Viewpoint	DCI Jill Conroy	5 episodes
2021–2026	Ted Lasso	Dr. Sharon Fieldstone	Season 2–4, 14 episodes
2022	Riches	Claudia Richards	6 episodes
2022	The Sandman	Rosemary	Episode: "A Hope in Hell"
2023	Rugrats	Nanny Pip (voice)	Episode: "Nanny Pip"
2024	Fallen	Miriam / Sophia	8 episodes
2025	The Loud House	X (voice)	Episode: "Europe Road Trip: A Knight to Remember"

== Awards and nominations ==
Year	Award	Category	Work	Result	Ref.
2019	Offie	Best Female Performance in a Play	Leave Taking	Won	
2021	Pena de Prata	Best Supporting Actress in a Comedy Series	Ted Lasso	Nominated	
2021	Pena de Prata	Best Ensemble in a Comedy Series (shared)	Ted Lasso	Won	
2022	74th Primetime Emmy Awards	Outstanding Supporting Actress in a Comedy Series	Ted Lasso	Nominated	
2022	28th Screen Actors Guild Awards	Outstanding Performance by an Ensemble in a Comedy Series	Ted Lasso	Won	
2023	75th Primetime Emmy Awards	Outstanding Guest Actress in a Comedy Series	Ted Lasso	Nominated	
