= Ruth Benamaisia-Opia =

Nigerian radio and television presenter

- Spouse: Prof. Eric Opia
- Children: Weruche Opia
- Presenting career
- Show: NewsLine
- Station: NTA
- Network: Nigerian Television Authority
- Time slot: 9:00 PM - 10:30 PM Sundays
- Show: Network News
- Station: Nigerian Television Authority
- Network: Nigerian Television Authority
- Time slot: 9:00 PM weekdays
- Country: Nigeria

Ruth Benamaisia-Opia is a veteran Nigerian broadcaster. She was the anchor of NewsLine on Nigerian Television Authority (NTA). She was a one-time Commissioner for Information in Bayelsa State and also was a radio presenter with Radio Nigeria, Enugu.

== Early life and career ==
Benamaisia-Opia was born in Lagos State to a diplomat father from Bayelsa State and a Ndokwa mother from Delta State. She lived her early life in Nairobi, Kenya, where she developed a passion for broadcasting after watching presenters and newsreaders. She began her broadcasting career in 1977 in Enugu after her father, upon asking about her career aspirations, introduced her to professionals in the field. Following successful auditions, she started working with the NTA straight out of secondary school, casting the 9 o'clock news. She later became the anchor of NewsLine on the same station, airing every Sunday night at 9 o'clock. After leaving the NTA, she worked in an oil company where she was the community relations manager. She returned to broadcasting in 2016 with the Lagos Weekend Television.

== Personal life ==
Benamaisia-Opia is married to Prof. Éric Opia, former Chairman of the Oil Mineral Producing Areas Development Commission (OMPADEC). She is the mother of Weruche Opia, a British-Nigerian film and stage actress and entrepreneur.
