= Will Hislop =

British actor, writer and comedian (born 1993)

- Born: William David Hislop; 1993 (age 32–33); London, England
- Education: Tonbridge School
- Alma mater: Jesus College, Oxford
- Occupations: Actor; writer; comedian
- Years active: 2017–present
- Parent(s): Ian Hislop; Victoria Hislop

William David Hislop (born 1993) is a British actor, writer and stand-up comedian.

== Early life and education ==
William David Hislop was born in 1993 in London, the son of Private Eye editor Ian Hislop and his wife novelist Victoria.

He attended Tonbridge School for his secondary education. He then studied history at Jesus College, Oxford, and alongside Barney Fishwick formed a comedy double act called Giants.

== Career ==
Hislop is an actor, writer, and stand-up comedian.

He was cast in the 2020 TV series Gangs of London, and played Lewis in the 2023 A24 / BBC series Dreaming Whilst Black.

He also features in a number of videos, such as "When you pretend you're not posh", featuring Hislop as a privately educated individual downplaying his privileged upbringing (reverse snobbery), and "Sexy guy", which is filmed at the Radcliffe Camera at Oxford.

== Filmography ==
=== Film ===
Year	Title	Role	Notes
2019	Military Wives	Protester	
2024	This Time Next Year	Greg	
2024	Touchdown	Tom Hunter	

=== Television ===
Year	Title	Role	Notes
2019	Drifters	Adrian (voice)	2 episodes
2019	Doctors	Raymond 'Dre' Dreyfuss	Episode: "The Butcher's Boy"
2020	Gangs of London	Banker	2 episodes
2021	Grantchester	Maurice St Martin	Episode #6.3
2021	The Emily Atack Show		3 episodes
2021	Kart Postal	Martin	12 episodes
2021	Black Death	Monster / Demon Rabbit	2 episodes
2022	Father Brown	Sandy Beauchamp	Episode: "The Island of Dreams"
2022	PRU	Noah	Episode #1.2
2023	A Whole Lifetime with Jamie Demetriou	Stewart the City Boy	Episode #1.1
2023	Dreaming Whilst Black	Lewis	3 episodes
2024	One Day	Toby	2 episodes
2024	Death in Paradise	Barney Keats	Episode #13.7
2024	Baby Reindeer	Billy	Episode 4
2025	Horrible Science	Various roles	9 episodes
2025	Big Boys	Bamboo Armitage	Series 3, episode 3
2025	Jazz Emu: Ego Death	Posh Rival	Television short

== Awards ==
In 2017 he won the UK's Musical Comedy Awards.

== Social media ==
In 2020, Hislop's "your aunt on the NHS clap" tweet went viral, gaining 4.2 million views on the platform.
