= Mea Culpa (2024 film) =

Film directed by Tyler Perry

- Release poster
- Directed by: Tyler Perry
- Written by: Tyler Perry
- Produced by: Tyler Perry; Dianne Ashford; Will Areu; Angi Bones; Kelly Rowland
- Starring: Kelly Rowland; Trevante Rhodes; Nick Sagar; Sean Sagar; RonReaco Lee; Shannon Thornton
- Cinematography: Cory Burmester
- Edited by: Larry Sexton
- Music by: Amanda Delores; Patricia Jones
- Production company: Tyler Perry Studios
- Distributed by: Netflix
- Release date: February 23, 2024
- Running time: 120 minutes
- Country: United States
- Language: English

Mea Culpa is a 2024 American legal thriller film written and directed by Tyler Perry. The film stars Kelly Rowland as a criminal defense attorney, who takes the case of an artist (played by Trevante Rhodes), who is accused of murdering his girlfriend. The film also stars Sean Sagar, Nick Sagar, RonReaco Lee, Shannon Thornton, and Angela Robinson.

The film was released by Netflix on February 23, 2024.

== Plot ==
Seasoned Chicago defense attorney Mea Harper faces ongoing marital strife, due to her husband Kal's infidelity and his mother Azalia's domineering influence. At Azalia's birthday dinner everyone learns that her brother-in-law, Ray Hawthorne, an ambitious assistant district attorney, is set to prosecute a high-profile murder case against Zyair Malloy, a charismatic local artist.

Despite the familial discord, Mea becomes intrigued when Zyair asks her to defend him, proclaiming his innocence and insisting Ray has a personal grudge against him. When her close friend and Ray's wife Charlise and Kal discover she was offered it, they both insist she not take the case. He tries to forbid her, but Mea reminds him of their mounting bills and that he has not contributed for six months as he was caught drunk and high at his job as an anesthesiologist.

Mea delves into the case, encountering much evidence that initially seems compelling. The prosecution supposedly shows copious amounts of blood and skull fragments on a painting matching Hydie's DNA. Zyair says the Mexican-national left without a trace after six months of bliss. Mea shows him Hydie's video, saying he was violent and fearing for her life, which he insists is false. Supposedly Zyair had a life insurance policy on her.

Zyair reiterates he was framed, suggesting hidden motives behind the charges. He complicates matters by consistently trying to compromise Mea's professional interactions with him, challenging her objectivity and professional ethics. The situation is further strained by Ray, Kal and Azalia who surprise Mea with a meal at home to vehemently oppose her involvement in the case, claiming it could tarnish the family's reputation, especially as Ray prepares for a mayoral run.

These pressures strengthen Mea's resolve to uncover the truth. The judge OKs the in-laws opposing each other. Mea's PI Jimmy meets Zyair, giving him a browbeating to see if he cracks. As Hydie's supposed family in Mexico are unreachable, he heads there. Strangely, Jimmy finds nothing.

The prosecution's case hinges on questionable evidence, including Hydie's dubious video and an embittered ex as a character witness. Zyair explains that the older gallery owner Renee helped get him known, but resented his ending it. Mea suspects the high-profile case against Zyair is being orchestrated by Ray to boost his career.

Zyair pressures Mea to admit their mutual attraction. He fires her when she refuses, but apologizes the following day. Zyair had previously introduced her to an underground 'dance club', really a sex club, then openly fornicates with a female neighbor as she leaves. Shaken when Jimmy calls to tell her Kal is booked into a hotel with an ex, Mea returns to Zyair's to sleep with him.

The next day Mea interviews Renee, realising Zyair uses the same m.o. to seduce everyone. Marching back to Zyair's she confirms it, discovering he simply layers his conquests paintings on his ceiling. Mea drops off his files and leaves. In the evening, Kal and his family confront her, so she confesses she slept with Zyair. Mea goes to the Dominican Republic for a few days to disconnect, where she sees Hydie, who runs off when approached.

Calling the US, Ray convinces Mea to return as he will supposedly send an investigator. At Ray's, Jimmy calls Mea with the information that Charlise had also been with Zyair, which she confirms upon finding his painting of her there. Azalia breaks Mea's phone, supposedly accidentally.

Mia reveals to Ray what Jimmy confirmed-- Azalea does not have cancer. He is surprised she took so long to discover the truth, that all is a ploy to get him elected as mayor and simultaneously punish Zyair and Charlise for their affair.

Charlise is ordered to stab Mea but she instead goes for Azalia, who inadvertently stabs her to death. Mea barely gets away from Ray, grabs a pickup but then crashes it. She runs onto the highway, finding Kal. Believing he does not know, she gets in the car. However, Mea realises Kal is in on it and equally cold-hearted as his family, so intentionally undoes his seatbelt, steering them into an oncoming tractor trailor.

In the morning, Ray is taken into custody while Zyair is released, upon reception of an anonymous e-mail. Mea washes her hands of it, walking away.

== Cast ==
- Kelly Rowland as Mea Harper
- Trevante Rhodes as Zyair Malloy
- Nick Sagar as Ray
- Sean Sagar as Kal Harper
- RonReaco Lee as Jimmy
- Shannon Thornton as Charlise
- Kerry O'Malley as Azalia
- Arianna Barron as Jenna
- Connor Weil as Bobby
- Angela Robinson as Renee

== Production ==
In February 2023, it was reported that Kelly Rowland would produce and star in the legal thriller Mea Culpa written, produced, and directed by Tyler Perry. Trevante Rhodes, Sean Sagar, Nick Sagar and RonReaco Lee were also cast. Principal photography began on March 6, 2023, in Atlanta at the Tyler Perry Studios, with a few days in Chicago, and wrapped on March 26.

== Release ==
Mea Culpa premiered at the Paris Theater in New York City on February 15, 2024. It was released by Netflix on February 23, 2024.

== Reception ==
On the review aggregator website Rotten Tomatoes, 18% of 22 critics' reviews are positive, with an average rating of 3.2/10. The website's consensus reads: "Neither campy enough to qualify as a guilty pleasure nor exciting enough to hold up as a thriller, Mea Culpa is a sorry entry in the Tyler Perry filmography." Metacritic, which uses a weighted average, assigned the film a score of 33 out of 100, based on 5 critics, indicating "generally unfavorable" reviews.

Lisa Kennedy of The New York Times describe the film "willfully steamy, decidedly silly thriller". The writer reflected that Rowland "commits to the thankless task of playing a smart woman gone stupid" while Rhodes "can't do much with Zyair, whose affect is more flat than seductive". Murtada Elfadl of Variety wrote that "many will write it off as shlock, and yet, there's something admirable about a filmmaker who knows exactly what his audience wants." Even if "Rowland and Rhodes have no chemistry" and the scenes don't show "anything resembling real life", Edfadl affirmed that the film "should work for anyone familiar with Perry's oeuvre".
