= Inayah Lamis =

American R&B singer from Houston, Texas

Inayah
- Born: Inayah Lamis; November 8, 1989 (age 36); Houston, Texas, U.S.
- Genre: R&B
- Occupations: Singer; songwriter
- Labels: Empire; Inayahlator

Inayah Lamis, known mononymously as Inayah (born November 8, 1989), is an American R&B singer, songwriter and actress from Houston, Texas.

== Career ==
Inayah was born on November 8, 1989 in Houston, Texas, where she was raised and began singing at a young age alongside developing a storytelling style influenced by gospel, blues and R&B records heard in her home. She later worked at a jingle company and built an online following with cover videos and short-form performances.

In 2018, Inayah gained wider attention after her remake of Ella Mai's "Boo'd Up" went viral on Instagram and was reposted by several celebrities. That exposure helped lead to her breakthrough original single, "Fairy Tale", which was released in 2018.

Her debut studio album, S.O.L.A.R. (an acronym for "Storytelling Over Lyrics and Rhymes"), was released in December 2019 through Inayahlator Enterprises and Empire Distribution. The album included the single "Best Thing", which later became Inayah's first certified song release when it was certified platinum by the Recording Industry Association of America (RIAA) in 2023. In June 2021, Inayah released the extended play (EP) Side A, her first project since S.O.L.A.R. (2019). The six-track EP included the singles "Fallin" and "What Are We?", and featured a guest appearance from fellow Houston musician Scarface on the album track "Houston TX".

In 2022, Inayah released her second studio album, Insecure. Insecure featured production from Dixson, Troy Taylor, Triangle Park, Kxhris, Nellz, Super Miles, and Happie. Inayah followed it up with the release of her third album Wait, There's More in 2024 through Inayahlator Enterprises and Empire.

In June 2026, Inayah released her fourth studio album, Therapy Wasn’t Enough, through Inayahlator Enterprises and Empire. The album consists of production contributions from Damon Thomas, Eric Dawkins, DJ Camper, Brody Brown, and DJ Chose. The album was preceded by the singles "Outside" and "Choose".

== Artistry ==
Inayah's music has been described as R&B and soul-oriented, with an emphasis on personal storytelling and emotionally direct lyricism. She has said that storytelling is central to her work, and that she uses her songs to create relatable, narrative-driven records.

== Discography ==
=== Studio albums ===
- S.O.L.A.R. (2019)
- Insecure (2022)
- Wait, There's More (2024)
- Therapy Wasn't Enough (2026)

=== Extended plays ===
- Side A (2021)

=== Singles ===
- "Fairy Tale" (2018)
- "N.A.S." (2019)
- "Suga Daddy" (2019)
- "Best Thing" (2019)
- "Go Get That B" (with Ramengvrl) (2020)
- "Fallin" (2021)
- "What Are We" (2021)
- "Always Something" (2022)
- "Most Girlz" (2022)
- "For the Streets" (2023)
- "Hot Sauce" (2024)
- "Why Shemix" (with Lizzen) (2024)
- "Choose" (2026)
- "Outside" (2026)

== Filmography ==
Film

Year	Title	Role	Notes
2025	Finding Joy	Littia	Feature film debut

Television

Year	Title	Role	Notes
2024	Bad vs. Wild	Herself	Episode: "Alter Egos"
