= Dreaming Whilst Black =

British television comedy series

- Genre: Comedy
- Created by: Adjani Salmon; Natasha Jatania; Max Evans; Laura Seixas
- Written by: Adjani Salmon; Ali Hughes; Thara Popoola; Yemi Oyefuwa
- Directed by: Sebastian Thiel; Koby Adam; Joelle Mae David; Jermain Julien; Abdou Cissé
- Starring: Adjani Salmon; Dani Moseley; Demmy Ladipo; Rachel Adedeji; Babirye Bukilwa
- Country of origin: United Kingdom
- Original language: English
- No. of series: 2
- No. of episodes: 12

Production
- Executive producers: Adjani Salmon; Dhanny Joshi; Thomas Stogdon; Tanya Qureshi; Ali Hughes
- Producers: Nicola A. Gregory; Gina Lyons
- Production companies: Big Deal Films; A24

Original release
- Network: BBC Three
- Release: 19 April 2021 – 16 October 2025

Dreaming Whilst Black (stylised as Dreaming Whilst B\@*k) is a British comedy television series created by Adjani Salmon, Natasha Jatania, Max Evans, and Laura Seixas. Originally a webcast, a television pilot (2021) developed into a series that premiered on BBC Three on 24 July 2023. A second series was broadcast in 2025.

== Synopsis ==
Kwabena works in recruitment but dreams of being a filmmaker with his video producer friend from film school Amy, who has just returned from three years in Nigeria. Amy offers to pass Kwabena's script, Jamaica Road, on to the development team at the production company where she works. Kwabena lives with his cousin Maurice and Maurice's wife, Funmi, who is heavily pregnant. The couple are reading up on the latest tips on pregnancy, and researching practices including hypnobirthing.

The first series follows Kwabena's attempts to negotiate the filmmaking sector, his necessary forays into the gig economy, and his developing relationship with Vanessa, a woman he meets by chance at a bus stop. Amy has her own problems, feeling passed over for promotion and frequently enduring clumsy comments from her colleagues.

In the second series, Kwabena gets his first directing job on a television series called Sin and Subterfuge. He navigates the demands of his actors, crew, and executive producers, while Maurice and Funmi raise their new child and Amy's sister comes to stay with her.

== Cast and characters ==
=== Main ===
- Adjani Salmon as Kwabena
- Dani Moseley as Amy, an old school friend of Kwabena's
- Demmy Ladipo as Maurice, Kwabena's cousin and flatmate
- Rachel Adedeji as Funmi, Maurice's pregnant wife
- Babirye Bukilwa as Vanessa, Kwabena's girlfriend

=== Supporting ===
- Jo Martin as Grace, Kwabena's mother
- Martina Laird as Aunt Polly, Funmi's aunt
- Roger Griffiths as Uncle Claude, Polly's husband
- Jessica Hynes as Drew, Kwabena's agent
- Will Hislop as Lewis, Kwabena's colleague at the recruitment firm

Series 1

- Isy Suttie as Helen, the founder of Kwabena's filmmaking programme
- Peter Serafinowicz as Howard, Amy's boss
- Akemnji Ndifornyen as William
- Steve Furst as Pastor
- Ovie Soko as Amar
- Angus Wright as Timothy Eastly

Series 2

- Charles Edwards as Simon, a producer on Sin and Subterfuge
- Christine Adams as Bridgette,
- Jay Scarlett as Errol, Grace's boyfriend
- Kobna Holdbrook-Smith as Rudolph, the lead actor on Sin and Subterfuge
- Lizzy Connolly as Roxie, the lead actress on Sin and Subterfue
- Alexander Theo as Alexandros, Kwabena's assistant director

== Episodes ==
Series overview
Series	Episodes	Originally released
Pilot	1	19 April 2021
1	6	24 July 2023
2	6	9 October 2025

=== Pilot (2021) ===
Title	Directed by	Written by	Original release date	U.K. viewers (millions)
"Pilot"	Sebastian Thiel	Adjani Salmon & Ali Hughes	19 April 2021	N/A

=== Series 1 (2023) ===
No.	Title	Directed by	Written by	Original release date	U.K. viewers (millions)
1	"The Dream"	Sebastian Thiel	Adjani Salmon & Ali Hughes	24 July 2023	N/A
2	"The Reality"	Koby Adom	Adjani Salmon & Ali Hughes	24 July 2023	N/A
3	"The Friends"	Koby Adom	Adjani Salmon & Ali Hughes	31 July 2023	N/A
4	"The Birth"	Joelle Mae David	Adjani Salmon & Ali Hughes	31 July 2023	N/A
5	"The Pitch"	Joelle Mae David	Adjani Salmon & Ali Hughes	7 August 2023	N/A
6	"The Premiere"	Jermain Julien	Adjani Salmon & Ali Hughes	7 August 2023	N/A

=== Series 2 (2025) ===
No.	Title	Directed by	Written by	Original release date	U.K. viewers (millions)
1	"Black Sheep"	Sebastian Thiel	Adjani Salmon	9 October 2025	N/A
2	"Blackwash"	Sebastian Thiel	Thara Popoola	9 October 2025	N/A
3	"Blackguard"	Sebastian Thiel	Ali Hughes	9 October 2025	N/A
4	"Black Love"	Abdou Cissé	Yemi Oyefuwa	16 October 2025	N/A
5	"Black Swan"	Abdou Cissé	Ali Hughes	16 October 2025	N/A
6	"All Black Everything"	Abdou Cissé	Adjani Salmon	16 October 2025	N/A

== Production ==
=== Development ===
The web series of Dreaming Whilst Black began in 2018 after Salmon and Hughes met at the Met Film School along with the rest of the creators Natasha Jatania, Max Evans and Laura Seixas. A television series pilot aired on BBC Three in 2021, and it was awarded a BAFTA Craft Award for "emerging talent: fiction" in 2022 and the Royal Television Society's 2022 Breakthrough Award. The pilot was directed by Sebastian Thiel with producers for Big Deal Films, including Gina Lyons, Thomas Stogdon, Dhanny Joshi, Nicola Gregory and Salmon.

The full series is co-produced by A24 and Big Deal Films. Co-written by Ali Hughes, producers on the series include Natasha Jatania, Laura Seixas, Max Evans, Chadley Richards and Salmon.

A second series was commissioned in February 2024, and aired in October 2025.

=== Casting ===
The cast includes Demmy Ladipo and Rachel Adedeji from the original pilot. The series cast also includes Babirye Bukilwa, Martina Laird, Roger Griffiths and Jo Martin. In June 2023, Will Hislop, Jessica Hynes, Akemnji Ndifornyen, Isy Suttie, Peter Serafinowicz, Steve Furst, and Ovie Soko were revealed as part of the cast.

== Broadcast ==
The series was broadcast on BBC Three from 24 July 2023. In the United States, the series was broadcast on Paramount+ from 8 September 2023, and Showtime from 10 September 2023.

== Reception ==
=== Critical reception ===
The review aggregator website Rotten Tomatoes reported a 100% approval score based on 17 reviews.

Michael Hogan in The Daily Telegraph praised the "humour and heart" of the series, which "confidently balances serious points about discrimination, health inequality and history". Dan Einav in The Financial Times noted the satire of the creative industries' "superficial application" of buzz phrases such as "diversity" and "inclusivity" with Salmon a "natural, charming leading man".

The second season received five stars from The Guardian, who described the series as "masterly".

== Accolades ==
The series was nominated in the Best Casting category, and Ashley White was nominated in the Best Editing – Entertainment and Comedy category at the 2023 Royal Television Society Craft & Design Awards.

For his work on the series, Adjani Salmon was shortlisted for the BAFTA Breakthrough Award in November 2023.

In February 2024, the series won at the Broadcast Awards in the International Programme category as well as being nominated for the Best Comedy Programme award. The series was nominated for Best Comedy at the 2024 Broadcasting Press Guild Awards.

In March 2024, the series was nominated for Scripted Comedy and Salmon was nominated in the Male performance in a comedy programme category at the 2024 British Academy Television Awards.

In March 2026, Adjani Salmon and Ali Hughes were nominated for best writer in a comedy, with Salmon nominated for comedy performance, and the series nominated in the best comedy drama at the 2026 Royal Television Society Programme Awards.
