= Finding Joy (2025 film) =

- Release poster
- Directed by: Tyler Perry
- Written by: Tyler Perry
- Produced by: Will Areu; Angi Bones; Carmen K. Jones; Tyler Perry
- Starring: Shannon Thornton; Tosin Morohunfola; Brittany S. Hall; Inayah; Aaron O'Connell
- Cinematography: Justyn Moro
- Edited by: Storm Evans
- Music by: Kristen Personius
- Production companies: Amazon MGM Studios; Tyler Perry Studios
- Distributed by: Amazon Prime Video
- Release date: November 5, 2025
- Running time: 107 minutes
- Country: United States
- Language: English

Finding Joy (marketed as Tyler Perry's Finding Joy), is a 2025 American romantic comedy-drama film written, produced, and directed by Tyler Perry. It stars Shannon Thornton, Tosin Morohunfola, Brittany S. Hall, Inayah, and Aaron O'Connell.

Talented but unappreciated New York City fashion designer Joy is stranded in Colorado after a discovering her love interest is engaged to someone else, where she unexpectedly finds love that transforms her career and life.

Finding Joy was released on November 5, 2025 by Amazon Prime Video.

== Plot ==
Joy lives and works in New York City for verbally abusive fashion designer Pat-Treek, who steals her designs. She puts up with it but her friends Ashley and Littia are concerned. They are also unsure of Joy's ambiguous relationship with Colton.

Colton invites Joy to Colorado to meet his parents and ask her an important question. Expecting a proposal, she accepts.

In Colorado Joy meets his mom and Heather, who she assumes is his sister. Colton asks her to be his "best woman", while Heather videos. Seeing decorations for an engagement party, Joy realises Heather is Colton's fianceé. Shocked and humiliated, she feigns exhaustion, asking to rest.

Calling Ashley and Littia, Joy announces she must leave immediately. At the airport she learns all flights are grounded due to an incoming major snowstorm.

Joy rents a car unsuitable for the weather. She becomes lost, inadvertently stopping over a frozen lake. Trying to catch a signal on her phone, she plunges through the ice and loses consciousness.

Joy awakens unclothed under a blanket in a small hunting cabin with a man. Assuming she has been abducted, she runs outside screaming for help, but they are in a remote location. The man, Ridge Philips, endeavors to nurse Joy back to health. Learning she drove onto a partially frozen lake, she thanks him for risking his life.

Back in New York, Ashley is worried about Joy's phone being untrackable, unaware it is at the bottom of the lake. Back at Ridge's cabin, Ridge has given Joy fresh clothes.

At Colton's parents', Colton and Heather do not worry about Joy after reading her text. Joy struggles to adjust to cabin life: Ridge eats mostly what he can kill and she is a vegan. She also initially resists using the outhouse. Ridge promises to drive Joy to town once the storm passes, which could be up to a week.

Joy offends Ridge, calling him "weird". He then disappears to hunt, as they are short on food. Later, Ridge reveals his mother, who loved the cabin, died two years ago, and the clothes on Joy were hers. She later unintentionally tears her quilt while getting firewood but mends it perfectly. Ridge tells her the quilt was a gift from his mother, then shows her its tag, which reads "To Ridge From Joy", a Navajo friend of his mother. He apologizes, explaining the holidays are hard because his mom died just before Christmas.

Joy and Ridge get drunk together, sharing more about themselves. She reveals she came to Colorado for Colton, whom Ridge knows. He is estranged from his family as his father remarried soon after his mom's death, which his brothers accepted. Now understanding each other, they become attracted and sleep together.

Ashley and Littia inform Colton and his family that Joy has been missing for a week. Colton assures them the sheriff will help once the storm breaks.

The sky finally clears but Joy's reaction upsets Ridge, who interprets her excitement to leave as casting him aside. Hiking down the mountain, they meet the sheriff, Colton, Heather, Ashley, and Littia. They part without saying goodbye.

A month later, Joy is fired when her boss Claiborne receives an email accusing them of ignoring black designers. As evidence, the email contains the original sketches for some of Pat-Treek's "work" as they were created years ago at Joy's college. At home, Joy feels life was better with Ridge. He shows up at her door with flowers. Ridge's family, after reconciling, urged him to find her. Still upset over her job, she tries to brush Ridge off but he insists she listen. He has not stopped thinking about her, professes his love and tells her he is flying home tomorrow. Joy kisses him and they agree to return to Colorado together.

Before leaving, Joy gets called back to the office. Claiborne fires Pat-Treek for stealing her work, renaming the clothing line after Joy. She initially turns it down, but Ridge convinces her to accept. They will marry, living between New York and Colorado.

Joy accepts Claiborne's offer provided everyone receives better treatment. Later, Joy and Ridge get married in a boat house beside a Colorado lake.

== Cast ==
- Shannon Thornton as Joy
- Tosin Morohunfola as Ridge
- Brittany S. Hall as Ashley
- Inayah as Littia
- Aaron O'Connell as Colton
- Eric Stanton Betts as Pat-Treek
- Jeffery Thomas Johnson as David
- A.J. Tannen as Claiborne
- Natalie O'Connell as Heather
- Whitney Goin as Wynona
- Hugh B. Holub as Sheriff Jackson

== Production ==
In February 2024, it was announced that filming had wrapped with Tyler Perry writing and directing a new movie that was previously titled Joy Ridge with Shannon Thornton and more were added to the cast.

== Release ==
The film was released on November 5, 2025.
