= Weruche Opia =

Nigerian actress (born 1989)

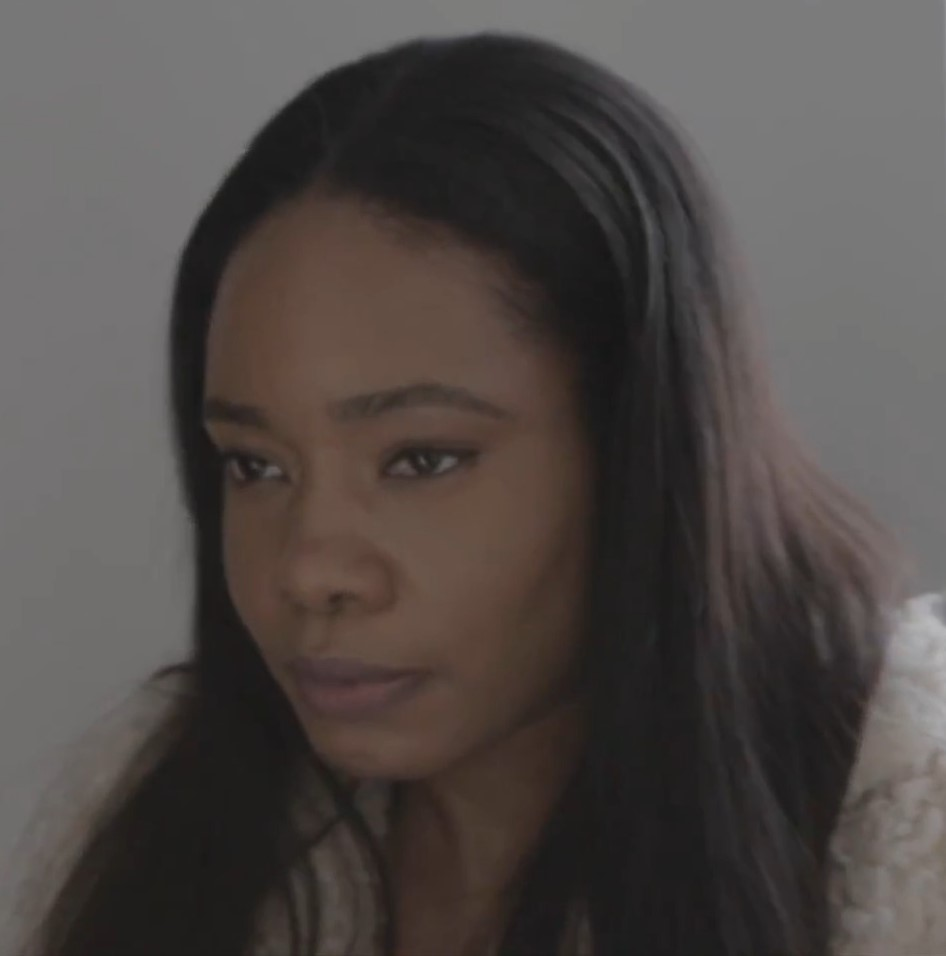
- Opia in 2017
- Born: Reanne Weruche Opia; 11 April 1987 (age 39); Lagos, Nigeria
- Education: University of the West of England, Bristol
- Occupations: Actress; entrepreneur
- Years active: 2010–present
- Mother: Ruth Benamaisia-Opia

Reanne Weruche Opia (/wəˈruːtʃeɪ ˈoʊpiə/) (born 11 April 1987) is a Nigerian actress and entrepreneur. She is the founding CEO of the clothing line Jesus Junkie Clothing. She was nominated for a British Academy Television Award for her performance in the BBC miniseries I May Destroy You (2020).

== Early life and education ==
Born in Lagos, Opia moved to Southeast London at the age of 13. Her father, Eric Opia, was an author and professor of social sciences and her mother is veteran Nigerian broadcaster and television host Ruth Benamaisia-Opia. Opia holds a degree in drama and sociology from the University of the West of England, Bristol.

== Career ==
After making her television debut with a guest appearance in a 2010 episode of The Bill, Opia spent a year with the Renegade Theatre Company in Nigeria. Upon returning to England in 2012, she appeared in the Channel 4 crime drama Top Boy and the Channel 5 procedural Suspects.

Opia gained prominence through her role as Cleopatra Ofoedo in the third series of the BBC comedy Bad Education and its 2015 spinoff film. Opia was nominated in 2015 in the Nollywood Actress of the Year category at the 2015 Nigeria Entertainment Awards for her role in the film When Love Happens. From 2019 to 2020, Opia was in the main cast of the Dave sitcom Sliced as Naomi.

Opia starred as Terry Pratchard in Michaela Coel's BBC series I May Destroy You, which first aired in June 2020. For her performance, Opia was nominated for a British Academy Television Award and won a Black Reel Award. In 2022, she appeared in the ITV thriller Our House.

== Audiobook narration ==
Year	Title	Author	Notes
2019	Daughters of Nri	Reni K Amayo	Fantasy
2019	My Sister the Serial Killer	Oyinkan Braithwaite	Thriller
2021	Descendants of the First	Reni K Amayo	Fantasy
2021	The Upper World	Femi Fadugba	Science Fiction / Fantasy
2020	Raybearer	Jordan Ifueko	Fantasy
2022	Honey & Spice	Bolu Babalola	Romance
2024	Only Big Bumbum Matters Tomorrow	Damilare Kuku	Satirical
2025	A Really Short History of Nearly Everything	Bill Bryson	Non-fiction
2025	Cursed Daughters	Oyinkan Braithwaite	Contemporary
2025	Sweat Heat	Bolu Babalola	Romance
2025	The Motherless Land	Nikki May	Literary

== Filmography ==
=== Film ===
Year	Title	Role	Director	Notes
2014	When Love Happens	Mo	Seyi Babatope	Romance
2015	The Bad Education Movie	Cleopatra Ofoedo	Elliot Hegarty	Comedy
2015	Prey	Ebele	Sunny King	Short film
2015	Isla Traena	Tamikah	Freddy Syborn	Short film
2016	When Love Happens Again	Mo	Seyi Babatope	Romance
2017	Thereafter	June	Yinka Idowu	Short film
2018	Haircut	Funmi	Koby Adom	Short film
2021	Invisible Manners	Narrator (Epilogue)	John Lee Taggart	Short film
2022	Slumberland	Agent Green	Francis Lawrence	Netflix film
2026	Ladies First	Ruby	Thea Sharrock	Netflix film

=== Television ===
Year	Title	Role	Notes
2010	The Bill	Selina Moris	Episode: "Death Knock"
2013	Top Boy	Nafisa	4 episodes
2014–2015	Suspects	Mae Roberts	2 episodes
2014, 2022	Bad Education	Cleopatra Ofoedo	Main role (series 3); Cameo (reunion special)
2015	Banana	Lilia	1 episode
2015	Hot Pepper	Toya	Web series; episode: "One-Night Stand"
2017	Just a Couple	Melissa	Miniseries; 4 episodes
2018	Inside No. 9	Maz	Episode: "Tempting Fate"
2019–2021	Sliced	Naomi	Main role
2020	I May Destroy You	Terry	Miniseries; main role
2022	Our House	Merle	Miniseries; main role
2023	High Desert	Carol	Main role
2023	Black Mirror	Unnamed actress	Episode: "Loch Henry"
2024	Iwájú	Otin (voice)	Main role
2024	The Jetty	Riz Samuel	Main role
2026	Bait	Felicia	Recurring

== Stage ==
Year	Title	Role	Notes
2014	Liberian Girl	Finda	Royal Court Theatre, London
2015	The Trial	Comptroller	Young Vic, London
2018	The Divide	Giella	The Old Vic, London

== Awards and nominations ==
Year	Award(s)	Category	Work(s)	Result	Ref.
2015	Nigeria Entertainment Awards	Actress of The Year (Nollywood)	...When Love Happens	Nominated	
2015	Africa Magic Viewers Choice Awards	Best Actress in a Comedy	...When Love Happens	Nominated	
2021	Independent Spirit Awards	Best Ensemble Cast in a New Scripted Series (shared with cast)	I May Destroy You	Won	
2021	British Academy Television Awards	Best Supporting Actress	I May Destroy You	Nominated	
2021	Black Reel Awards	Outstanding Supporting Actress, TV Movie or Limited Series	I May Destroy You	Won	
2023	AudioFile Earphones Award	For her narration of Honey & Spice.	Honey & Spice	Won	
