= Princess Victoria, Shepherd's Bush =

Coordinates: 51.5063°N 0.2409°W

Princess Victoria
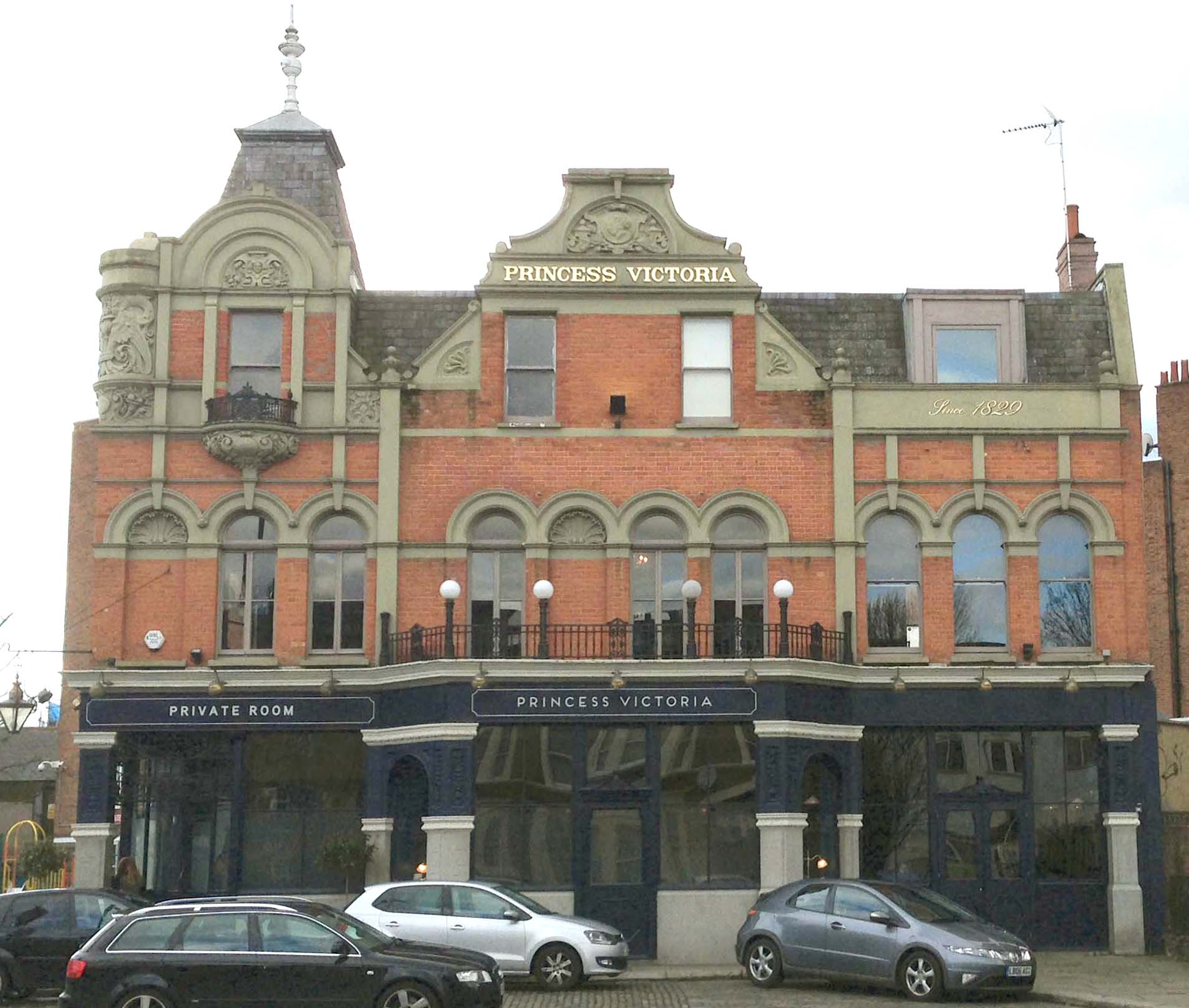
- Princess Victoria Pub in 2015
- Interactive map of Princess Victoria

Restaurant information
- Established: 1829
- Food type: Gastropub
- Location: London, W12, England

The Princess Victoria is a public house and former gin palace on the Uxbridge Road, Shepherd's Bush, London W12. First opened in 1829, it closed in June 2017 when its parent company, Affinity Bars and Restaurants, became insolvent, but re-opened in November 2017 under new operators Three Cheers Pub Company.

== History ==
The Princess Victoria dates from 1829 and was one of London's earliest gin palaces. It was popular with commuters when the tram began carrying 1,000 passengers a day between Acton and the Uxbridge Road. Commuters could enjoy a "quick gin and water" before returning home. One of the first licensees was one George Turner. Designed in the grand Victorian style, this imposing red brick building with stucco ornaments was for many years a "rough Irish pub" until its gentrification in the early 2000s.

=== Modern era ===
In the 1980s the Princess Victoria was briefly owned by Richard Branson and run as a music venue, with singer Phil Collins filming the music videos for his songs "Sussudio" and "One More Night" on the premises.

The pub was later re-invented as a gastropub and was described by Time Out in 2016 as a "regal boozer...the best pub for miles around [with a] beautifully restored interior, and by The Guardian as having "a diverse wine list and refined pub grub".

In 2015 the Princess Victoria was awarded "London County Dining Pub of the Year" in The Good Pub Guide 2016.

Anthony Bourdain filmed his Part’s Unknown episode in London post Brexit vote in 2016 and met Nigella Lawson during the episode at The Princess Victoria for a Guinness, some starters and a chat.

=== 2017 Closure and re-opening ===
In June 2017 the Princess Victoria closed without warning, apparently after its parent company became insolvent. The pub's owners, Affinity Bars and Restaurants, blamed the "fatal" Brexit vote for a 20% collapse in earnings that led to the closure.

In September 2017 London based Three Cheers Pub Company announced that they had taken on The Princess Victoria. They reopened the pub in November 2017 following a full makeover.

=== The Gentlemen ===
The Princess Victoria was a major location for Guy Ritchie's film The Gentlemen (2019), starring Matthew McConaughey and Hugh Grant.
