= Alexis Rodney =

British actor

- Born: Alexis Rodney; United Kingdom
- Occupation: Actor
- Years active: 1997-present

Alexis Rodney is a British actor known for his work in films such as Guardians of the Galaxy, Killing Jesus, and Buffalo Soldiers.

== Biography and career ==
Rodney started acting in 1997 at the National Youth Theatre of Great Britain. In 1998, he successfully auditioned for the seminal BBC Film Storm Damage.

Rodney will be appearing in The Gentlemen, Guy Ritchie's Netflix series set to premiere in 2023. As well as in the Dungeons and Dragons movie and upcoming dark comedy Young Gun.

He has appeared in Outlander, Street Fighter: Resurrection, and Pennyworth, among others.

== Selected filmography ==
Film roles
Year	Title	Role
2000	Storm Damage	Shinehead
2001	Buffalo Soldiers	Parsons McCovey
2010	Wild Target	First Hotel Receptionist
2014	Guardians of the Galaxy	Moloka Dar
2015	Killing Jesus	Simon
2019	A Working Mom's Nightmare	Tom
2019	Hostage Radio	Anthony
2019	Pentagram	Max

Television roles
Year	Title	Role
2014	Outlander	Tebbe
2016	Street Fighter: Resurrection	Matt Furlong
2019	Pennyworth	Darren Thompson
2020	Out of Her Mind	Dr. Jekyll
2022	Willow	Lachlan
2023	The Gentlemen	Stevens
2026	Death in Paradise	Kelvin Mason
