= Gin palace =

Gin-selling establishment

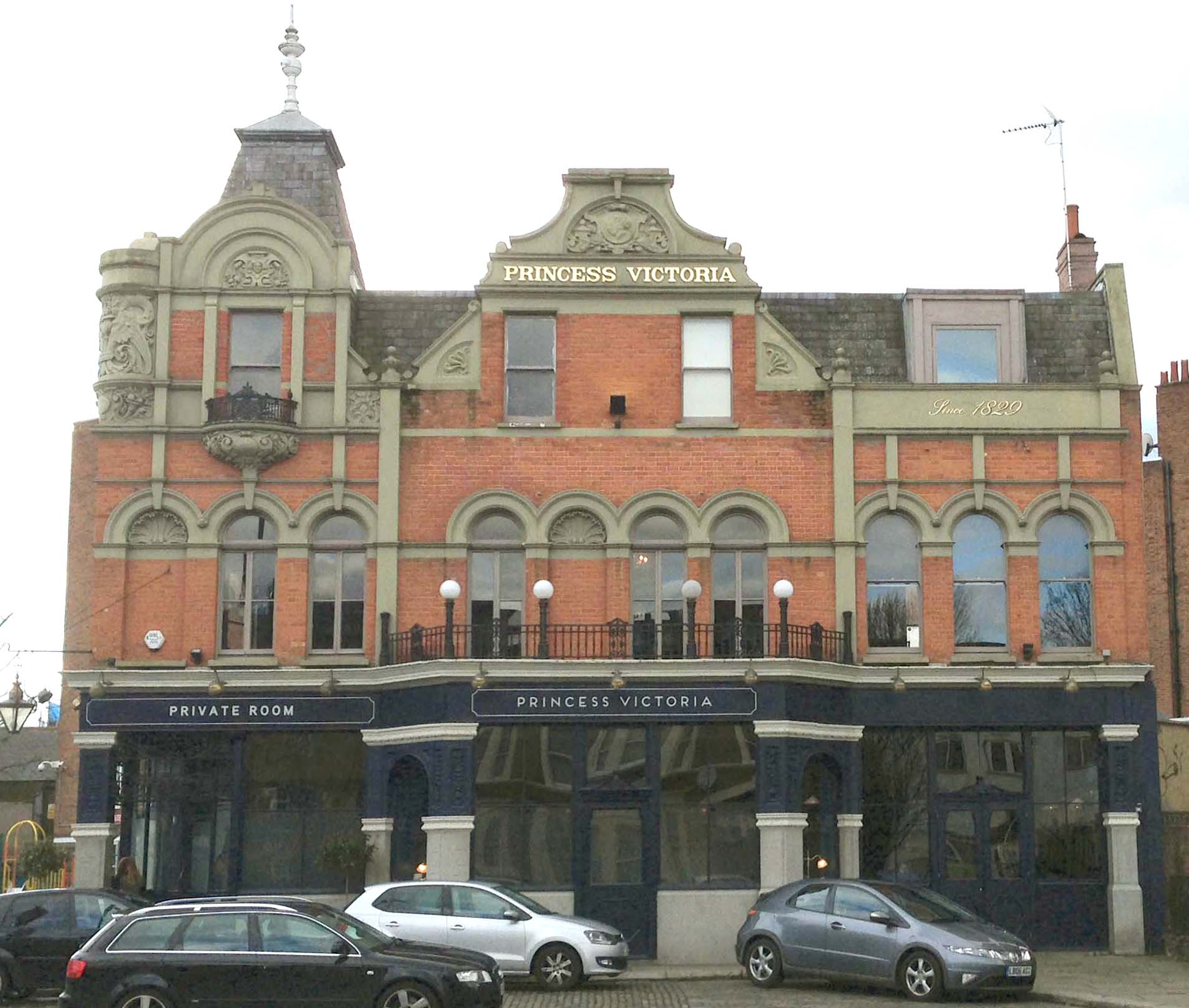
Princess Victoria, Uxbridge Road, London

A gin palace (also gin house and gin shop) is an English name originally for a lavish bar selling gin, later transferred by association to late Victorian pubs designed in a similar style.

== Architecture ==
In the 18th century, gin shops or 'dram shops' were just small shops (often originally chemist's shops as gin originally had medicinal associations) that sold gin mostly to take away or to drink standing up. As the legislation changed, establishments generally became larger and also had to be licensed and sell ale or wine. The earliest 'Gin Palaces' emerged in the 1830s, Thompson and Fearon's in Holborn and Weller's in Old Street, London. They were based on the new fashionable shops being built at the time, fitted out at great expense and lit by gas lights. They were thought to be vulgar at the time, although they were hugely popular. Charles Dickens described them as "perfectly dazzling when contrasted with the darkness and dirt we have just left…" in his Sketches by Boz.

The design influenced many aspects of later Victorian pubs, even after gin had declined in importance as a drink; the bar in pubs is based on the shop counter of the gin palace, designed for swift service and ideal for attaching beer pumps; the ornate mirrors and etched glass of the late 19th century. The term has survived for any pub in the late 19th-century style; as this was the peak of pub building in Britain the style has become associated with the pub, even though none of the original gin palaces survives.

Well-preserved examples of the late 19th-century style include:

- Princess Louise in Holborn
- Princess Victoria, Uxbridge Road, London
- Philharmonic Dining Rooms in Liverpool
- Baker's Vaults in Stockport which has underground vaults where remain the brick stalls designed to hold gin barrels
- Crown Liquor Saloon a.k.a. the Crown Bar in Belfast

== Pleasure boats ==
In the 20th century, the term "gin palace" came to be used for large ostentatious pleasure craft, such as a motor yacht or luxury yacht, typically moored in a marina and fitted with a sun deck used for outdoor entertaining and leisure, normally involving alcoholic drinks.

== Warships ==
Because of her luxurious fittings and a corruption of her name ("A Gin Court"), the 1913 battleship HMS Agincourt was referred to as the "Gin Palace" in the Royal Navy.

== Sources ==
- Licensed to Sell: The History and Heritage of the Public House, Geoff Brandwood, Andrew Davison, Michael Slaughter. ISBN 1-85074-906-X
- Palaces of Pleasure: From Music Halls to the Seaside to Football, How the Victorians Invented Mass Entertainment, (2019) Lee Jackson. Yale University Press. ISBN 0-30025-478-4
