= Dionne Brown =

British actress

- Born: 1995 (age 30–31); London, England
- Education: ArtsEd (BA
- Occupation: Actress
- Years active: 2017–present
- Television: Criminal Record; Queenie

Dionne Brown (born 1995) is an English actress. After studying at the Arts Educational Schools and appearing in numerous stage productions of theirs, she began appearing in various television series. As well as appearing in the Apple TV+ series Criminal Record, Brown starred as the titular character in the Channel 4 series Queenie.

== Life and career ==
Brown was born in London in 1995. As a child, she trained in dance, later deciding to study acting with the National Youth Theatre. Brown later obtained a BA in acting from the Arts Educational Schools (ArtsEd) in London. Whilst studying there, she appeared in numerous of their stage productions, including The Cherry Orchard, Love and Information and Romeo and Juliet.

After graduating from ArtsEd 2021, she made her television debut in the ITV1 true crime series The Walk-In. She portrayed a younger version of character Leona (Cecilia Noble). In 2024, she portrayed the recurring role of DC Chloe Summers in the Apple TV+ thriller series Criminal Record. That same year, she starred as the titular character in the Channel 4 series Queenie. The series, based on the 2019 novel of the same name, was created by its original author, Candice Carty-Williams. Brown had previously auditioned for her 2023 series Champion. Despite being unsuccessful for Champion, she was asked to audition for Queenie and was ecstatic to be cast in the role.

== Filmography ==
| Year | Title | Role | Notes |
|---|---|---|---|
| 2021 | Kemi | Dionne | Short film |
| 2022 | The Walk-In | Young Leona | 1 episode |
| 2024 | Criminal Record | DC Chloe Summers | Recurring role |
| 2024 | Queenie | Queenie Jenkins | Main role |

== Stage ==
| Year | Title | Role | Venue |
|---|---|---|---|
| 2017 | Three | Chanel | National Youth Theatre |
| 2018 | Open Door | Marie | Open Door Group |
| 2019 | The Cherry Orchard | Ranyevska | ArtsEd |
| 2019 | Love and Information | Various | ArtsEd |
| 2020 | Dance Nation | Amina | ArtsEd |
| 2020 | Romeo and Juliet | Lady Capulet | ArtsEd |
| 2020 | In These Four Walls | Shakyra | ArtsEd |
| 2024 | Cabin Fever | Lisa | Royal Court Theatre |
