= Jon Pointing =

English actor and writer

- Born: Jonathan Pointing; September 1986 (age 39)
- Occupations: Actor, writer
- Years active: 2012–present
- Children: 1

Jonathan Pointing is a British actor, writer and comedian. For his performance in the Channel 4 comedy-drama Big Boys (2022–2025), he received two British Academy Television Award nominations. He is also known for his roles in the BBC Three series Pls Like (2017–2021), the ITV2 sitcom Plebs (2018–2022), and the Sky series Smothered (2023) and Sweetpea (2024), and BBC’s Small Prophets (2026).

== Career ==
In 2024, he appeared as Tom Blake in the comedy Queenie; the series was based on the novel of the same name by Candice Carty-Williams.

== Personal life ==
He was educated at Winchester University. Pointing revealed in July 2021 that he is married.

== Filmography ==
Year	Title	Role	Notes
2012	Life Guru	Paul	Short film; Also writer
2013	The Phone Call	City Worker	Uncredited
2015	The Last Day		Short film; Also writer
2015–2017	Weetabix Go Breakfast Drink		Commercial
2016	@Elevenish	Chris	3 episodes
2016	Damned	Rudi	Series 1 Episode 3
2016–2017	Virgin Games	Vlad the Vampire	Commercial; "Live a Little"
2017	Liam Williams' Valentine	Rory	Television short
2017	Double Act	Jon	Also writer
2017	Zapped	Jay-Winn	Episode: "The Party"
2017	The Great Unwashed	Charlie Brumble	
2017–2021	Pls Like	Charlie South	15 episodes
2018	Nick Helm: The Killing Machine		
2018	News Crack	Various	Television film
2018–2022	Plebs	Jason	16 episodes
2019	London Kills	Jamie Bentham	Episode: "The Politician's Son"
2019	Daddy Time	Sean	Short film
2019	Down From London	Bean	Episode: "Margate"
2020	Crying Out Loud	Caspar	Episode: "Edd & Thom Get It Together"
2020	Key Worker	Bradley	Online Video Shorts; 4 episodes
2021	Starstruck	Dan	2 episodes
2022–2025	Big Boys	Danny	18 episodes; Channel 4 comedy
2023	A Whole Lifetime with Jamie Demetriou	Reality TV presenter	Netflix Pilot episode
2023	Smothered	Tom	Lead role
2023	Murder is Easy	Rivers	Two-part drama
2024	Queenie	Tom Blake	3 episodes; Channel 4 comedy drama
2024	Sweetpea	Craig	Lead role; Sky Atlantic
2026	Run Away	Ash	Supporting role; Netflix
2026	Small Prophets	Clive	6 episodes
2026	The Witness	DC Nick Sparshatt	Supporting role
