= Malcolm Kamulete =

British actor

- Born: 19 August 1996 (age 30); Stratford, London, England
- Occupation: Actor
- Years active: 2011–present
- Television: Top Boy; Champion

Malcolm Kamulete (born 19 August 1996) is a British actor and musician. He is known for his roles in the series Top Boy and Champion.

== Early life ==
Kamulete was born to Congolese parents who had arrived in England the year prior and grew up in Henniker Point in Stratford. He attended Rokeby School in Canning Town. He played football for Bethnal Green FC and Dagenham United FC as an under-21.

== Career ==
Kamulete made his film debut as an extra in the Plan B film Ill Manors (2012). From 2011, he played Ra'Nell Smith in the Channel 4 television series Top Boy. Although he received plaudits for his performance, Ashley Walters told radio station Capital Xtra that Kamulete was approached about returning to the show when it transitioned to Netflix, but he wasn't interested and intended to focus on a career in football.

In 2023 he stars as Bosco Champion in the BBC One musical series Champion from show-runner Candice Carty-Williams.

== Filmography ==
Key
†	Denotes works that have not yet been released

Year	Title	Role	Notes
2011-2013	Top Boy: Summerhouse	Ra'Nell Smith	8 episodes
2012	Ill Manors	Estate background actor	Film
2020	The Re-Up	Breeze	1 episode
2023	Champion	Bosco Champion	Lead role
