= The Capture (TV series) =

British TV series (2019–present)

- Genre: Conspiracy thriller; Crime drama; Techno-thriller
- Created by: Ben Chanan
- Written by: Ben Chanan
- Starring: Holliday Grainger; Lia Williams; Ron Perlman; Ben Miles; Ginny Holder; Cavan Clerkin; Paapa Essiedu; Indira Varma
- Composers: Ian Arber; Dave Rowntree
- Country of origin: United Kingdom
- Original language: English
- No. of series: 3
- No. of episodes: 18

Production
- Executive producers: Ben Chanan; Rosie Alison; David Heyman
- Producer: Derek Ritchie
- Cinematography: Rasmus Arrildt; Kieran McGuigan; Philippe Kress
- Editors: Carly Brown; Dan Farrell; Matthew Tabern; Kim Gaster; Richard Graham; Emma Oxley
- Running time: 56–73 minutes
- Production company: Heyday Television

Original release
- Network: BBC One
- Release: 3 September 2019 – present

The Capture is a British conspiracy thriller television series created and written by Ben Chanan and produced by Heyday Television as part of Universal International Studios for the BBC. The series premiered on BBC One on 3 September 2019, with a second series premiering on 28 August 2022, and a third series on 8 March 2026.

The series is centred on Rachel Carey (Holliday Grainger), a fast-track Metropolitan Police detective drawn into a vast conspiracy involving real-time deepfake technology, mass surveillance, and manipulated video evidence. The narrative focuses on the dangers of a "post-truth" society, examining themes of political interference, state-sanctioned disinformation, and the ethical implications of covert intelligence operations. A central plot point is the practice of "Correction", a fictional programme used by intelligence agencies to edit live video feeds in real-time to create false "admissible" evidence and control public narratives.

The Capture has received positive reviews from critics throughout its run, who have praised its tense narrative and its exploration of surveillance and digital manipulation, as well as the performances of Grainger and other lead actors.

== Premise ==
=== Series 1 ===
Former soldier Shaun Emery is released from prison after his conviction for a war crime in Afghanistan is overturned on appeal owing to flawed video evidence. However, his return to civilian life is short-lived when CCTV footage implicates him in the assault and kidnapping of his barrister, Hannah Roberts. While Emery attempts to clear his name, DI Rachel Carey investigates and soon begins to uncover a wider conspiracy, calling into question the validity of the surveillance footage.

=== Series 2 ===
Six months later, DCI Rachel Carey is now entrenched in the UK's own "Correction" unit, having seemingly joined the intelligence operation she once sought to expose. When rising politician Isaac Turner MP becomes the target of a live deepfake hack, Carey finds herself in the middle of a new conspiracy involving the dangerous rise of real-time deepfake technology. Faced with a threat that has evolved far beyond CCTV tampering, she must navigate a landscape of political interference as well as media manipulation while challenging the boundary between digital fabrication and the truth.

=== Series 3 ===
One year after exposing the "Correction" programme, Rachel Carey is now the Acting Commander of Counter Terrorism Command, overseeing the launch of Operation Veritas, a new surveillance system designed to detect digital manipulation in real-time. When a well-coordinated act of terror strikes central London, Carey becomes the sole eyewitness to a crime that her own technology cannot verify. As she investigates, she uncovers a conspiracy reaching the security and political establishment, forcing her to question herself and the costs of pursuing a truth that few are willing to believe.

== Cast and characters ==
=== Main ===
Overall

- Holliday Grainger as Rachel Carey – A fast-track detective whose career is defined by a ruthless ambition and a rigid, often isolating moral compass. While highly capable and headstrong, she is frequently viewed as "spiky" and "plain-speaking," traits that often place her at odds with her superiors and leave her with few personal allies. Despite her tactical sharpness, her commitment to accountability leads her trust in her own integrity to be pushed to its breaking point.
- Lia Williams as DSU Gemma Garland – An inscrutable and glacial senior intelligence official within SO15. A pragmatic operative who prioritises national security over transparency, she frequently employs morally ambiguous methods to protect state interests.
- Ron Perlman as Frank Napier – A powerful and cynical CIA Section Chief who utilises ruthless, clandestine tactics to protect American interests. He oversees covert state operations with a pragmatic disregard for legal transparency.
- Ben Miles as Danny Hart – The Commander of SO15 who oversees counter-terrorism operations. While a staunch defender of national security, he is increasingly conflicted by the ethical cost and systemic deception involved in covert state programmes.
- Ginny Holder as DS (later DI) Nadia Latif – A principled and methodical detective who relies on empirical facts over intuition. Her process-driven approach often leads her to identify the technical anomalies that expose larger conspiracies.
- Cavan Clerkin as DS Patrick Flynn (series 1–2) – seasoned, street-smart detective and pragmatic ally to Carey. Despite initial scepticism of her career path, he provides a grounded perspective while assisting her in navigating complex investigations.
- Paapa Essiedu as Isaac Turner MP (series 2–3) – The Minister of State for Security and a rising political star. After his career and personal life are upended by a real-time deepfake hack, he becomes an ally to Carey in her attempt to expose 'Correction'.
- Indira Varma as Khadija Khan (series 2–3) – A fierce and high-profile BBC News presenter and investigative journalist. Ambitious and ruthlessly pragmatic, she prioritises her own career advancement and the pursuit of high-stakes information over personal loyalty, often operating on a strictly transactional basis.

Series 1

- Callum Turner as Shaun Emery – A former British Army Lance Corporal who is released from prison after a successful appeal against a war crime conviction. A determined and protective father, he soon finds himself at the centre of a new criminal investigation after incriminating CCTV footage appears to show him assaulting his barrister.
- Laura Haddock as Hannah Roberts – A brilliant and principled human-rights barrister who successfully represents Shaun Emery during his appeal. Her sudden disappearance, and her apparent assault caught on CCTV, triggers a major police investigation.
- Barry Ward as Charlie Hall – A solicitor and close colleague of Hannah Roberts who works to secure Shaun Emery's initial release. He is a member of the "Pilgrims of Justice," an activist group dedicated to exposing flaws in the surveillance state.
- Ralph Ineson as DCI Alec Boyd – An experienced detective who oversees the investigation into Hannah Roberts’ disappearance and manages the procedural pressures of the high-profile investigation.
- Alexander Forsyth as Eli Jacobi – A CIA analyst working in a covert London-based unit. A skilled digital expert, he becomes a key figure in the investigation when he appears to act as a whistleblower regarding the use of manipulated surveillance footage.

Series 2

- Charlie Murphy as Simone Turner – The wife of Isaac Turner who faces increasing strain as a result of the inflammatory public statements attributed to her husband. She struggles to protect her family's privacy while navigating the resulting tensions and distrust within her marriage.
- Joseph Arkley as Gregory Knox – The calculating and ambitious CEO of Truro Analytics, a powerful data analytics firm that specialises in using advanced algorithms and artificial intelligence to influence public opinion.
- Natalie Dew as Aliza Clarke – A dedicated Special Adviser who manages the Minister's public profile and policy development.
- Harry Michell as Rhys Edwards – A pragmatic and cynical Special Adviser who manages the Minister's strategic communications.

Series 3

- Killian Scott as Commander Noah Pierson – The mysterious new permanent head of SO15.
- Hugh Quarshie as Commissioner Cameron Yates – Head of the Metropolitan Police.
- Andrew Buchan as Deputy Commissioner Julian Talbot – Yates's second in command.
- Isabella Brownson as Paige Thomas – A police communications official.
- Linus Roache as Colonel Christopher Figgis – Commanding officer of E Squadron.
- Jonathan Aris as Major Peter Neuman – A military doctor in E Squadron.

=== Supporting ===
Overall

- Daisy Waterstone as Abigail Carey – Rachel's younger half-sister
- Nigel Lindsay as DCI Tom Kendricks – A senior SO15 official and tactical lead who ensures operational stability within the CTC control centre. A long-term colleague of Rachel Carey, he provides logistical oversight and support during her investigations.
- Tessa Wong as DC Chloe Tan (series 2–3) – A diligent and observant fast-track detective. Emerging as a "shadow" of Rachel Carey, she provides meticulous, data-driven support for investigations while striving to prove herself as a key member of the team.
- Andy Nyman as Sir Rowan Gill (series 2–3) – The Home Secretary and Isaac's superior at the Home Office. A seasoned politician, he is one of the few officials with high-level knowledge of the "Correction" programme.

Series 1

- Sophia Brown as Karen Merville – Shaun's former partner and the mother of his young daughter. She is wary of his release and remains deeply concerned for their daughter's well-being as the legal and media scrutiny surrounding him intensifies.
- Alan Williams as Eddie Emery – Shaun's grandfather who provides him with a place to stay and emotional stability following his release. He remains a steadfast believer in his grandson's innocence as the criminal investigation and media attention intensify.
- Paul Ritter as Marcus Levy – A seasoned broadcast consultant and video engineer who provides the expert technical evidence required to secure Shaun's initial release. He later assists Rachel Carey by theorising how CCTV footage could be manipulated through "delayed" transitions.
- Famke Janssen as Jessica Mallory – A high-ranking official from the Office of the Director of National Intelligence and Frank Napier's superior. She arrives in London to oversee American interests in the "Correction" programme and ensure the integrity of the operation remains intact.
- Sharon Rooney as Becky – A local authority CCTV footage monitor who first spots the apparent assault of Hannah Roberts while on duty. Her report to the emergency services triggers the police's involvement and the subsequent manhunt for Shaun Emery.

Series 2

- Rob Yang as Yan Wanglei – The UK Head of the Chinese artificial intelligence company XANDA, who leads the firm's bid for a government contract to implement facial recognition technology at British borders.
- Joshua Jo as Edison Yao – A computer scientist and Chinese dissident who acts as a key witness for the China Research Committee. His assassination serves as the catalyst for the investigation into a new form of digital manipulation.
- Angus Wright as Anthony Reed OBE – The BBC's Security Correspondent who serves as a high-level contact for the intelligence services. He is called to manage sensitive information and coordinate the media's response to emerging national security crises.

Series 3

- Amanda Drew as Angela Stilton – Head of Communications for the Metropolitan Police.
- Joe Dempsie as James Whitlock – A convicted criminal accused of being an assassin.
- Adrian Rawlins as Lord Justice Frederickson – Chair of the Correction Inquiry.
- Jude Mack as Natasha Hayes – A BBC News journalist working for Khadija Khan.
- Guy Clark as DC Squibbs – A nerdy police officer assisting Kendricks in his surveillance operations.
- Kenneth Collard as Wizard/Ralph – A tech specialist working for Frank Napier.

== Episodes ==
Series	Episodes	Originally released		Average UK viewers (millions)
Series	Episodes	First released	Last released	Average UK viewers (millions)
1	6	3 September 2019	8 October 2019	5.66
2	6	28 August 2022	12 September 2022	3.81
3	6	8 March 2026	12 April 2026	3.11

=== Series 1 (2019) ===
No.	Title	Written and directed by	Original release date	U.K viewers (millions)
1	"What Happens in Helmand"	Ben Chanan	3 September 2019	5.56
After serving six months in prison for the alleged murder of an unarmed Taliban insurgent in Afghanistan, former Lance Corporal Shaun Emery is acquitted when the Court of Appeal rules that video evidence used to convict him was potentially flawed. Whilst celebrating victory, his barrister Hannah Roberts abruptly leaves. Emery goes after her and the two kiss, with Roberts then boarding a bus to go home. However, CCTV footage captures Emery assaulting and kidnapping her. Meanwhile, DI Rachel Carey has been temporarily seconded to Homicide and Serious Crime Command from SO15, having recently led Operation Sycamore that secured the convictions of four ISIS terrorists. Rachel's team is called to the scene of the kidnapping, and Carey calls in her contacts to identify Emery with facial recognition. Emery is arrested, but no trace of Roberts is found in his vehicle. In custody, Emery is shown the CCTV footage, but violently lashes out and claims it is fake. Carey sets about locating Roberts's body.
2	"Toy Soldier"	Ben Chanan	10 September 2019	4.97
Carey is told that the CCTV footage is now redacted by the Security Service. Unable to find Roberts's body or any other evidence, she is forced to release Emery on bail, but becomes suspicious and starts to suspect he may be suffering from PTSD. Emery attempts to track down Roberts himself, and with help from a friend breaks into her flat. He notices somebody else inside and gives chase, getting into a black cab to follow the man's vehicle. This activity is noticed by homicide detectives DS Nadia Latif and DS Patrick Flynn, who began following Emery despite lacking evidence for a warrant, and also by Carey via CCTV in the Counter Terrorism command centre. The taxi driver initially seems eager to aid Emery, claiming to recognise him from his publicised acquittal, but then locks Emery in the car and drives him to a house in Eaton Square, where he is escorted inside by armed men. Carey orders Flynn and Latif to intercept, but despite being parked in sight of the correct address, they see only an empty street. Emery is locked in an interrogation room, and American intelligence officers report that "the toy soldier is contained."
3	"Truffle Hog"	Ben Chanan	17 September 2019	5.19
Emery is questioned about Roberts's whereabouts by US intelligence officer Frank Napier, who shows him footage of his friend Matt being tortured in the next room. Latif and Flynn, frustrated at the case being hampered, leak the redacted CCTV footage online. Carey's team is assisted by DSU Gemma Garland from SO15, whom Carey recognises as the woman who ordered the redaction. The Eaton Square house is raided by MO19, but police are unable to find Emery. Carey searches for the earlier footage of him entering, but is told it cannot be found. Emery escapes from the Americans and confronts Marcus Levy, a video engineer who helped with his appeal. Levy tells him that although deepfake technology does exist, there is no way to alter live footage. However, Levy later meets with Carey and hypothesises that footage of Emery and Roberts could have been delayed slightly then altered, using a passing bus as cover for a transition shot. Emery meets Matt and sees that he has not been tortured. Emery leaves London in Matt's car, but Matt tips off the police. Pulling into a scrapyard, Emery discovers Roberts's body in the boot. Observing his movements on CCTV, and growing suspicious, Carey leaves to confront him.
4	"Blind Spots"	Ben Chanan	24 September 2019	5.56
Emery is sprayed with pepper spray by a police officer but is able to escape only to be confronted by Carey, who tells him about her suspicions. Before overpowering her and escaping in her car, Emery tells her he was actually taken to Gastor Square. Forced to abandon the police vehicle, Emery is kidnapped by two people calling themselves Alma and Kenny, who show him a GPS tracker in his shoe and dispose of it. Carey and Flynn deduce the actual location Emery was taken to in Belgravia and are met by Napier, who asks them to leave. Marcus Levy is attacked and left in a coma by Napier's men. After defying Garland's orders by trying to have Roberts's body relocated by the coroner, Carey is suspended from duty, accused of perverting the course of justice. She confronts Hart in The Shard, but he warns her to tread carefully and think about why Roberts, a human rights lawyer, would choose to represent Emery. Flynn uncovers footage showing that Roberts did get on the bus the evening of her disappearance. Using an airgapped phone with a map of CCTV blind spots, Alma takes Emery to an industrial nightclub. She tells him about the covert intelligence practice of "correction", in which video evidence is manipulated to convict suspects. He is met by the man he saw in Roberts's flat, Kenny, and his former solicitor Charlie Hall.
5	"A Pilgrim of Justice"	Ben Chanan	1 October 2019	6.04
The group show Emery the original footage that proves his innocence but tell him the alteration was not made by the intelligence community. A series of flashbacks show the lawyers working with the group to fake the footage of Emery attacking Roberts, helped by Eli, a whistleblower from Napier's team. They intended to reveal Roberts as alive after Emery's trial for her murder, and so uncover the practice of "correction" and exposing real miscarriages of justice. After Roberts goes into hiding, Garland, Hart and Napier begin to suspect the footage is a stunt to expose their practices, and Napier decides to make the false story "true" and kill Roberts. After interrogating Eli, Napier and his men track Roberts to a safe house, where she is killed. Hart informs Carey, and she leaves with Flynn, disgusted. Wanting Emery to be re-arrested, Hall's group tips off the police, who surround the club, but Emery is able to escape with the assistance of Carey and Flynn. Napier instructs Garland to identify Emery's daughter's school.
6	"Correction"	Ben Chanan	8 October 2019	6.64
Emery hides out at Carey's family home but leaves when false footage on the BBC shows him kidnapping his daughter. He confronts Charlie Hall and attacks him, but is intercepted by Garland, who allows him to visit his daughter. Napier is met by Jessica Mallory, a senior official with the Office of the Director of National Intelligence. Carey confronts them and demands that she be reinstated, and Emery be removed as a suspect, or she will send the footage of Roberts on the bus to the DPP and the IOPC. They remotely corrupt Flynn's USB drive so he cannot upload the footage. After spending time with his child under supervision, Emery is met by Napier, who reveals the whole meeting was filmed and will be altered to show him abusing her unless he confesses to killing Roberts. Emery agrees and pleads guilty to manslaughter on grounds of diminished responsibility. After sentencing, Garland defends the practice of correction to Carey, saying that they only fabricate footage for events that actually occurred. She urges Carey to join them. Emery is visited in prison by his ex-partner, who Carey told he was innocent of killing Roberts. He claims justice has now caught up with him and confesses he did murder the unarmed insurgent. Eli is diplomatically repatriated by Mallory, as the executive branch wants to leak the idea of correction as a conspiracy theory, thus giving them deniability. Carey hides an SD card containing a copy of the real bus footage, but then returns to SO15 and asks Hart and Garland when she can start working for them.

=== Series 2 (2022) ===
No.	Title	Directed by	Written by	Original release date	U.K viewers (millions)
1	"Invisible Men"	James Kent	Ben Chanan	28 August 2022	4.17
Six months after Emery's imprisonment, Carey has been promoted to DCI where she is assigned to a dead end department and mostly ignored by DSU Garland. Despite her apartment being bugged, Carey keeps covert footage of interactions with her superiors on a button cam in hopes of exposing their cover up of Emery's innocence. Meanwhile, Eddison Yao, a computer scientist, is killed by an assailant whose identity is erased on live CCTV feeds. The death is investigated by now DI Latif, DS Flynn and newcomer DC Tan, who refer the matter to Counter Terrorism Command. Security Minister Isaac Turner is in charge of the Chinese Research Committee (CRC), to determine whether Chinese AI XANDA can be used for facial recognition at the UK border. He is personally opposed, owing to their collaboration with the Chinese Government. After the company publishes a smear campaign against him in retaliation, he meets with Home Secretary Rowan Gill, who permits him to announce the rejection of XANDA early on Newsnight. Yao is revealed to be a member of CRC. Flynn follows a lead on Gregory Knox, a fellow CRC member who Yao called before his death, but they are pursued by the same assassins, who shoot and injure Flynn. Turner and Knox are taken to safehouses by Protection Command. Carey visits Flynn in hospital, confessing that she is trying to expose Hart, Garland, and the "correction" unit. Concerned for Turner's safety, Carey and Latif visit the safe house where they witness a live deepfake version of Turner appearing on Newsnight, instead endorsing XANDA.
2	"Made in China"	James Kent	Ben Chanan	29 August 2022	3.38
Turner is informed of the practice of "correction", but is prevented from revealing the deepfake under the Official Secrets Act for national security reasons. Deeming it safer to "keep her close", Carey is granted access to the investigation with DC Tan, but Latif is excluded. At Counter Terrorism Command, Frank Napier meets with Garland and Carey, stating he cannot assist owing to the UK's high levels of business with China. Hart and Tan interview Yan Wanglei, UK head of XANDA, at the Chinese Embassy where he denies involvement, and Hart places Tan on a surveillance unit to monitor him. Garland and Carey meet with the BBC, who are aware that Turner's remote appearance came from an IP address in China and want to investigate further. They threaten to run the lovechild story from the smear campaign despite Garland's threat of a D-Notice. Turner is interviewed by Hart and Kendricks on the story, but denies its legitimacy. Despite pressing from Gill to downplay the issue, he escapes the Home Office intending to appear on Newsnight to reveal the truth. Garland tasks Carey with stopping Turner but Carey, when confronting him, confesses the establishment kills people to protect the existence of "correction", warning him he needs a plan to expose them. Live, Turner attempts to vocalise his opposition to XANDA, but the live feed is intercepted with deepfake footage of him again supporting the program and also advocating racial profiling. Carey attempts to have it shut down but fails. Newsnight host Khadija Khan attempts to instigate an investigation, but is stopped by Carey who tells her she needs more evidence.
3	"Charlie Foxtrot"	James Kent	Ben Chanan	4 September 2022	3.78
A diplomatic vehicle collects Wanglei from the embassy and is followed by Tan, and tracked by Hart and Kendricks to Heathrow Airport. Rewatching the corrected interview, Carey questions why XANDA would fake Turner acknowledge their AI has racial bias. Wanglei arrives at the airport but does not decamp. Carey becomes concerned it is a distraction, and reroutes with Turner to the hospital where Flynn is being treated. She enters the ward without backup, leaving Turner in her vehicle. He observes a van (that he previously saw outside his house) pull up to a service entrance, and two men in scrubs enter a lift. He warns Carey, who arrives to find Flynn and his SCO19 guards dead, and her secure police radio and the hospital CCTV compromised. Doctored live footage shows her with the guards alive, declaring the situation normal. The assassins delete footage of them killing Flynn he captured on his phone. Turner tries to follow the van and call 999, but is pulled over by regular traffic patrol. Carey tells Hart and Garland she believes Napier and the CIA are behind the conspiracy, hacking their systems and conducting a false flag to turn the UK against China. She admonishes Garland for allowing a CIA tech into the BBC studio during Turner's interview. Knowing he cannot acknowledge correction to the public, Gill fires Turner as security minister after the Newsnight interview. Carey discovers the proof of Emery's innocence missing from her family home. Turner returns to a Black Lives Matter protest outside his house, but it is revealed Khan gave him a spy camera, and he captured Gill acknowledging correction. Reviewing her own footage, Carey obtains a capture of Flynn's assassins in the hospital.
4	"#therealzacturner"	Philippa Langdale	Ben Chanan	5 September 2022	3.68
Carey convinces her half-sister, Abigail, to stay at her apartment, blaming her concerns about being watched on voyeuristic neighbours. Gill tells Hart that the United States was second in line for the facial recognition contract after China. Garland assigns Tan to monitor Carey. Carey meets with Turner, who is being hounded over the lovechild story and thinks he is being specifically targeted. He tells her about the footage of Gill, but she warns it may take years to obtain enough evidence to prove correction beyond a reasonable doubt. Garland meets with Napier, who reveals he has stomach cancer. The two bond over illness and faith. Doctored images of Turner with his alleged mistress in Lagos are published, causing a rift with his wife. He confronts the press outside his house, accusing them of spreading fake news. Deepfake footage of him agreeing to a paternity test and interview on BBC Breakfast is then shared on social media. Khan, concerned with Turner's outburst, interviews his alleged mistress Victoria Bello on Newsnight. Abigail tells Carey she is starting a podcast about a movement that believes Shaun Emery is innocent. Turner gets a call from a former aide, telling him despite the controversies his approval rating is actually rising. In a surprising turn, the paternity test is negative. At his hotel room, he is called by those behind the conspiracy using a voice modulator identical to his voice, who then send what appears to be a doppelganger to meet him in person. Carey meets with Gregory Knox, the CRC member who Flynn rescued, and asks him to use XANDA to remove the face mask in the image of the assassin. The program identifies him as Nikolai Mirsky, a Russian corporate security operative.
5	"Impostor Syndrome"	Philippa Langdale	Ben Chanan	11 September 2022	4.02
Turner opens the door to discover his former aide Rhys, now allied with Gregory Knox, who is partially behind the conspiracy. His firm, which uses psychographic data analysis, access to billions of social media accounts, deepfakes and an advanced algorithm has shifted its focus to electioneering. Having successfully tested their practices first in Tbilisi, Knox now wants to make Turner the next Prime Minister. Realising his chance at power, Turner reluctantly agrees. He returns home, ignoring Carey's calls to his burner phone. She asks him to give Mirsky's image to the authorities, but he denies all knowledge of their plans and leaves. Garland negotiates for SO15 to temporarily work from Napier's CIA station. Hart tells Garland he is resigning, implying he has become disillusioned with their activities. Carey arrives at the station to see they are conducting a manhunt for Mirsky, whose identity she thought only she was aware of. A CIA technician shows that the real footage from the hospital attack can be “de-corrected”, recovered from covert signal embedded in the time code. She asks her former superior, DSU Kendricks, if doctored footage could be added the same way. US firm Clear Horizons is awarded the AI border contract. Carey recalls they are a client of Gregory Knox's Truro Analytics, and confronts him over the conflict of interest his firms practices, and if he supplied Mirskys image to others. Compromised, he contacts Mirsky, whose van is picked up by SO15 and the CIA on ANPR. Carey and Knox fight, she detains him but is stripped of her radio. Mirsky and his colleague enter the office, but the other man kills Mirsky and calls in the shooting on a police frequency impersonating an AFO. He then frees Knox and abducts Carey.
6	"The Flip"	Philippa Langdale	Ben Chanan	12 September 2022	3.83
Carey is interrogated by Frank and Garland at the CIA station on who else is involved in exposing Correction. Carey correctly deduces Mirsky was a CIA asset, and that Frank is working with Knox. Garland threatens Carey into joining her at SO15 instead of becoming a whistleblower. Carey appears to capitulate, signing a statement covering up Mirsky, Frank and Knox's actions. Garland and Frank confirm in exchange, Knox has given them his algorithm, enabling them to predict possible dissenting behaviour of 3 billion people. Carey appears to work with Garland to recruit Khan and set up an interview which will kill Isaac's political career. However, he leaves upon discovering Khan will be hosting it. Frank discovers Garland manipulated his CT scans so she could get full control of the operation. Khan's interview proceeds with a deepfake of Isaac, but Carey and her SO15 colleagues (led by Kendricks) succeed in taking over the intercept. Changing the script from the CIA station, Carey has the Isaac deepfake expose Knox, big tech and Correction itself. Khan, also working with Carey, guides the interview. Horrified, Garland fails to arrest her as they are in US federal jurisdiction. A disgusted Frank refuses to help, noting the deepfake is not implicating the US. Trapped in the cab, Isaac watches the deepfake repair his reputation. Correction is exposed to the public as real when Isaac exits the taxi at Piccadilly Circus with cameras capturing both the interview on the screen behind and the real Isaac standing on the corner.

=== Series 3 (2026) ===
No.	Title	Directed by	Written by	Original release date	U.K viewers (millions)
1	"Don't Look at the Camera"	Anthony Philipson	Ben Chanan	8 March 2026	3.09
A year after exposing Correction, Carey is the Acting Commander of SO15. Turner, now Home Secretary, is tipped as the next Prime Minister ahead of a leadership contest. With Turner's support, Carey pioneers Operation Veritas, a camera network capable of capturing live deepfakes in action. Meanwhile, a public enquiry commences into Correction, leading Napier to warn Carey to keep the CIA's involvement out of her testimony. Carey has Napier monitored in response. Despite being happy to use her as the PR face of SO15, Commissioner Yates informs Carey that she will not be appointed as permanent Commander. At the enquiry, former Commander Hart refuses to give any information, citing national security. Nearby, the Veritas press launch at the QEII Centre is infiltrated by a gunman, who kills Turner and kills four AFOs. Carey and Hart pursue him, but he escapes. Carey realises footage captured of the gunman shows a different man to who she saw. Yates is keen to label the shooting as a racist assassination, but Carey insists Correction is at play. She orders Hart monitored and Garland brought in for questioning. However, when Noah Pierson, her replacement as Commander arrives, Carey recognises him as the assassin.
2	"Lone Wolves"	Anthony Philipson	Ben Chanan	15 March 2026	3.06
Carey has Pierson detained as an intruder, ostensibly because he has not passed separate SO15 vetting, but tells Kendricks and Latif he is the gunman. Carey reluctantly asks Garland for assistance, who suggests Pierson may be MI6. She does not believe Carey when told he killed Turner, arguing she is experiencing trauma transference. Pierson undergoes rigorous physical screening, revealing he has a pacemaker, and SO15 is unable to access his phone. Pierson maintains his innocence when Carey interrogates him, and Veritas camera footage is found supporting his alibi for the attack. Kendricks and Latif begin to doubt Carey, and Yates overrules her and has Pierson confirmed as new Commander. The man in the footage is identified as James Whitlock, recently released from prison for firearms offences and threats to kill. His name is released to the press as the focus of the investigation. Forced to work with Pierson, who keeps gaslighting her, Carey tricks him into driving to a remote location allegedly where Whitlock has been traced to. However, on entering he is incapacitated by Napier and CIA operatives with a stun gun.
3	"The Scarecrow"	Anthony Philipson	Ben Chanan	22 March 2026	3.02
Frank subjects Pierson to no-contact torture to ascertain his true identity, which he is able to resist. After addressing Frank by name and mocking his antiquated espionage practices, Pierson indicates they are on the same side but his mission is strictly need to know. When Pierson appears to suffer a heart attack, Frank reluctantly frees one arm so he can activate his pacemaker via a phone app. This allows Pierson to skillfully disarm and kill Frank and his CIA operatives, and confront Frank's IT expert, Wizard. Kendricks' efforts to eavesdrop on Hart and Garland when they meet are unsuccessful. Khan questions Carey's conviction in asserting that Whitlock is the main suspect in Turner's murder. Police raid Whitlock's farm in Kent and discover that with the assistance of an unknown contact named "Simon", he plans to gun down a group of illegal immigrants arriving by small boat. Whitlock is intercepted and arrested just before the attack and brought to SO15 for questioning. Carey returns to the operations room, shocked to find Pierson has resumed command. Pierson tells her privately the only way through for both of them is to work together.
4	"Kill Switch"	Johnny Allan	Ben Chanan	29 March 2026	3.05
Pierson is revealed to be an operative of MI6's E Squadron, led by Colonel Figgis who is in league with Yates and takes orders from Simon. After they failed to finish Pierson off via his heart implant to cover their tracks as he was tortured by Frank Napier, Colonel Figgis and Dr. Neuman grow concerned if he remains loyal to the mission. Pierson hands Wizard over to Carey. Garland and Hart use their connections to cover up Napier's death and delay a US investigation, and in exchange demand Carey keep Whitlock's files from his previous crimes redacted. Carey has Kendricks pull surveillance on them both, but he maintains CCTV observations on Garland. Whitlock asserts his rifle was unloaded and he was making a documentary on illegal immigration. He becomes distraught when shown the corrected footage from QEII, asserting he is being framed "again". Wizard tracks the messages from Simon received by Whitlock to the International Nautical Agency, and secretly sends codewords to Pierson. Carey and CTSFO Commander George go to investigate, but George is killed by Pierson. Figgis deploys E Squadron soldiers to take out Carey, but she is rescued by Pierson.
5	"Simon Says"	Johnny Allan	Ben Chanan	5 April 2026	3.01
One year earlier, Pierson (real name Captain William Walker) is badly injured when a mission in occupied Ukraine utilising Correction is compromised by Turner's intervention. He survives and receives the heart implant, which facilitates peak physical performance and resistance to torture. To reduce human error, E Squadron have grown dependent on "Simon", an advanced AI agent, to make decisions. Simon orders Walker to kill Turner and Carey, perceiving them as a threat to democracy. Walker is forced into accepting when Neuman remotely reduces his heart capacity to its actual, barely survivable level. In the present, Garland has Wizard deepfake a message from Napier to allow her access to the CIA's files on Whitlock. Talbot becomes suspicious of Yates, who served with Figgis before joining the police. Escaping through tunnels, Walker tells Carey his backstory and that Kendricks, blackmailed by Simon, compromised the Veritas feed. Simon also predicted Walker would not kill Carey, instead opting to destroy her reputation. Walker cuts out his implant to remove Simon's control, and offers to become a whistleblower against E-Squadron if Carey can protect him. Carey and a weakened Walker are intercepted by CTSFOs led by Tan, Latif and Hart.
6	"Someone to Watch Over Me"	Ben Chanan	Ben Chanan	12 April 2026	3.43
Carey resumes command of SO15 and has Whitlock released from custody. Walker is taken to Garland's house, where he reveals Simon is assisting the military industrial complex. Gill's testimony at the enquiry exposes Garland as an MI5 agent. Talbot agrees to work with Carey to expose the conspiracy. Figgis has Carey kidnapped, and orders her to re-arrest and charge Whitlock. When she refuses, one of his men seemingly kills Abigail, but leave Carey with a loaded gun. Garland testifies at the enquiry, justifying Whitlock's earlier framing, asserting he posed a legitimate threat. She then takes sole responsibility for running Correction, absolving more senior participants. Hart reluctantly gets Walker's implant re-activated so he can rescue Carey. However, he kills Garland at the hearing. BBC reporter Natasha Hayes, being blackmailed by Simon, captures footage that is again corrected to show Whitlock. Carey confronts and fatally shoots Walker, who argues before dying that Garland being dead means the public will think Correction is now also. MI6 kills Whitlock and his family. Carey reluctantly has Wizard use Correction to recreate footage of Walker executing Turner, and announces it to the press. MI6 respond by flooding social media with fake news that Walker was a Russian asset, causing the political establishment to consider war. Figgis points out Carey's hypocrisy in using Correction despite her opposition to it, and blackmails her to remain commander and assist him when needed. She reluctantly rebuffs Talbot when he offers her evidence of Yates's involvement. Yates, Gill and Frederickson are revealed to be part of the conspiracy with MI6. Abigail is revealed to be unharmed. After taking a selfie with her, an exhausted and defeated Carey hallucinates Garland in the background.

== Music ==
All tracks are composed by Ian Arber and Dave Rowntree.

=== Series 1 Original Soundtrack ===
No.	Title	Length
1.	"The Capture Titles"	0:49
2.	"The Soldier"	2:53
3.	"Would It Be You?"	4:11
4.	"The Assault"	3:10
5.	"What Happens in Helmand"	3:55
6.	"Seeing is Deceiving"	4:02
7.	"Tread Carefully"	4:29
8.	"Tall Man"	3:52
9.	"Toy Soldier"	3:33
10.	"Leaked"	4:07
11.	"Monitor"	4:21
12.	"The Body"	4:34
13.	"Gastor Square"	3:17
14.	"Fig Leaf"	3:14
15.	"A Pilgrim of Justice"	4:13
16.	"Safe House"	2:01
17.	"The Mole"	3:49
18.	"Believe Your Eyes"	4:35
19.	"Confession"	3:24
20.	"Alternative Fact"	4:21
21.	"Correction"	3:44

=== Series 2 Original Soundtrack ===
No.	Title	Length
1.	"Six Months Later"	4:27
2.	"The Politician"	4:44
3.	"中國製造"	3:14
4.	"Invisible Men"	3:15
5.	"D.C.I. Rachel Carey"	3:16
6.	"A True Believer"	2:50
7.	"Check The Feeds"	3:45
8.	"The 7th Floor"	1:44
9.	"#therealzacturner"	4:04
10.	"Free Shaun"	3:18
11.	"Взломан"	2:32
12.	"Hello Isaac"	2:33
13.	"Charlie Foxtrot"	2:50
14.	"The Algorithm"	3:00
15.	"Imposter Syndrome"	1:31
16.	"You In?"	2:08
17.	"Home Truths"	2:19
18.	"Newsnight"	3:48
19.	"Sabotage"	3:31
20.	"The Flip"	4:13

=== Series 3 Original Soundtrack ===
No.	Title	Length
1.	"Don't Look at the Camera"	2:55
2.	"Project Veritas"	3:29
3.	"A New Commander"	3:50
4.	"Lone Wolves"	3:43
5.	"Close Encounter"	3:32
6.	"At Large"	1:47
7.	"Operation Veritas"	3:06
8.	"Black Site"	3:03
9.	"Sound Mind"	2:49
10.	"Kill Switch"	1:43
11.	"The Scarecrow"	3:37
12.	"Thank You For Your Service"	2:00
13.	"Gaslight You"	2:27
14.	"Option 3"	3:21
15.	"Operation Frankenstein"	2:25
16.	"Hostages"	3:03
17.	"Performance Stats"	1:53
18.	"Kill Mission"	3:39
19.	"Simon Says"	2:43
20.	"Deactivation"	2:15
21.	"Enemy of the State"	3:41
22.	"Someone to Watch Over Me"	3:08

== Production ==
=== Development ===
The Capture was created by Ben Chanan, who drew on his background in documentary filmmaking and research into counter-terrorism. A team of researchers, including one who used to work in counter-terrorism, provided advice to the writer. Chanan has said the idea originated several years earlier while interviewing counter-terrorism operatives in the United Kingdom and the United States, where he became interested in the central role of video evidence in securing convictions. The premise developed from the intersection between this reliance on recorded images and the increasing ability to manipulate video using digital technology. He also cited 1970s conspiracy thrillers as an influence on the tone of the series.

Chanan initially pitched the concept unsuccessfully, before returning to it after completing work on The Missing and writing the first episode as a spec script. He has stated that producing a full script proved instrumental in advancing the project, after which Heyday Television took on development and the series was commissioned by the BBC for broadcast on BBC One. Following the success of the first series, the programme was subsequently recommissioned for a second series in 2020 and a third series in 2025. Chanan wrote every episode of the first three series, as well as directing the first.

=== Casting ===
In August 2018, it was announced that Callum Turner and Holliday Grainger would be leading the cast. In March 2019, additional casting was announced with Ron Perlman, Famke Janssen, Laura Haddock, Ben Miles, Lia Williams, Sophia Brown, Paul Ritter, Adelayo Adedayo, Ralph Ineson, Cavan Clerkin, Ginny Holder, and Nigel Lindsay joining the cast.

In August 2021, Paapa Essiedu had been cast as a guest series lead for the second series, with Andy Nyman and Indira Varma cast in supporting roles. In July 2022, it was announced that Charlie Murphy and Rob Yang were joining the cast.

In April 2025, it was announced that Killian Scott had joined the cast in a pivotal role for the third series, alongside Joe Dempsie, Andrew Buchan, Hugh Quarshie, and Amanda Drew in supporting roles. In January 2026, Linus Roache and Jonathan Aris were cast in supporting roles, and Paapa Essiedu was confirmed to return.

=== Filming ===
Series 1
Principal photography for the first series began in 2018, with filming primarily taking place in London. Locations included Holborn, Stratford, and Southwark, with additional filming taking place in Sutton, including Sutton Police Station and St Nicholas Road.

A sequence between Holliday Grainger and Ben Miles was filmed overnight at the Aqua Shard restaurant, located on the 31st floor of The Shard. Industrial scenes were filmed at the former Printworks London in Bermondsey. The Tate Modern and surrounding areas were also used for exterior sequences.

The fictional HMP Gladstone was portrayed using the decommissioned Canterbury Prison in Kent, where filming took place over two days in 2018. Flashback scenes set in Helmand, Afghanistan, were filmed in the desert landscapes near Málaga, Spain, using helmet-mounted cameras to achieve a documentary-style aesthetic.

Series 2
Filming for the second series commenced in August 2021, again primarily in London. Production made extensive use of government and media locations, including the BBC headquarters Broadcasting House, where exterior scenes were filmed, and interior scenes depicting a sequence set during a Newsnight broadcast were filmed within BBC studio facilities.

Additional locations included ExCeL London, which doubled as a conference venue, as well as office buildings at Buckingham Gate and London Wall, used to represent the Home Office and surveillance unit environments. Residential scenes were filmed in Sutton, including a Grade II listed property on Carshalton Road used as the home of Isaac Turner (Paapa Essiedu).

The series finale featured filming in Piccadilly Circus, where a key sequence involving public digital screens was staged. Some international filming took place in Zagreb, Croatia, which was used to depict locations in Eastern Europe.

Series 3
Filming for the third series began in April 2025, with production continuing to use London as its primary setting while expanding into locations across Kent and the South East of England.

London locations included Paddington, King's Cross, and the Strand, with additional filming in public and government buildings, including the Queen Elizabeth II Centre.

Regional filming took place along the Kent coast, including Samphire Hoe, where World War II bunkers were used as locations, and The Warren Country Park in Folkestone. Production also utilised underground tunnel networks beneath Paddington and King's Cross, which doubled as secret government passageways.

Set design
Interior scenes depicting the Counter Terrorism Command operations room, referred to by the production team as “The Mothership”, were filmed on a custom-built set at West London Film Studios. The set was designed to replicate a real-world Metropolitan Police command centre, with input from police security advisors to ensure authenticity.

The set featured a large curved wall of more than 70 screens. Rather than using green screens, production employed a “play-in” technique, in which pre-recorded CCTV-style footage was displayed live on the monitors during filming to allow actors to react in real time. The set was expanded for series 3, reflecting developments in the storyline, including changes to Carey's role.

== Release ==
The first series premiered on BBC One on 3 September 2019, and on Peacock in the US on 15 July 2020.

The second series premiered on BBC One on 28 August 2022, and on Peacock in the US on 3 November 2022.

The third series premiered on BBC One on 8 March 2026, on ABC Television and iview in Australia on 7 June 2026, and on Peacock on 18 June 2026.

A fourth series has not been announced, but Chanan has said "A trilogy feels nice. What we do after this, I don't know. This is maybe it. But at the same time, I feel the whole subject of AI, and how we’re going to live with it, is still evolving, for sure. We're just at the beginning of it. So there’s plenty of material and inspiration if we want to do another series."

== Reception ==
=== Critical response ===
==== Series 1 ====
The first series was reviewed positively by critics. On Rotten Tomatoes, it has an approval rating of 92% with an average rating of 8.1/10, based on reviews from 39 critics. The site's critical consensus said, "Gripping to the very end, The Capture's well-built tension culminates in a riveting revitalization of a tired genre". On Metacritic, which uses a weighted average, it received a score of 72 out of 100 based on 20 critic reviews, indicating "generally favorable reviews".

The Telegraph awarded the episode four stars, labelling the series as "riveting", and The Independent also awarded it four stars, designating it an "intriguing, but rather flawed, sort of Big Brother thriller set in our contemporary world of digital snooping". In his review in The Times, James Jackson referred to the drama as a "neatly structured thriller... clearly out to interrogate surveillance culture", also awarding four stars. Lucy Mangan, writing in The Guardian was less enthusiastic, concluding it to be a "twisty if lacklustre drama", giving the opening episode only three stars out of five.

Reviews improved over the course of the series, and the finale was highly praised by critics, with many drawing positive comparisons with the BBC's similar series Bodyguard which was broadcast around the same time the previous year. The Telegraph described it as a "highly satisfying series finale", while The Times critic James Jackson referred to the series as "the thinking man's' Bodyguard".

Sarah Hughes echoed these sentiments in her review of the series 1 finale in The Guardian, calling the show "nuanced and complex... one of the most cleverly plotted dramas of recent years", and the final episode as "a refreshingly grownup hour of television".

==== Series 2 ====
The second series was also reviewed positively by critics. On Rotten Tomatoes, the second series received an approval rating of 100% with an average rating of 7.8/10, based on 12 critics. The site's critical consensus said, "Deftly melding contemporary concerns with outlandish internal logic, The Capture's sophomore season is brainy camp that will detain your attention." On Metacritic, it received an average score of 70 out of 100, based on four critic reviews, indicating "generally favorable reviews".

The Telegraph awarded it four stars, labelling the series as "slick and well-written", and The Independent awarded it three stars, writing that "At its best, The Capture feels like the closest thing Britain has to Homeland". In her review in The Times, Carol Midgely awarded it five stars, writing that even though the finale was "implausible, elaborate, daft and had more twists than a cheap garden hose...It was also fabulously entertaining". Stuart Jeffries in The Guardian awarded it three stars, writing that "Despite the manifold sillinesses, the opening scene in James Kent's directed episode of Ben Chanan's drama is done effectively".

==== Series 3 ====
Series 3 received similarly positive reviews. On Rotten Tomatoes, as of June 2026 the third series received an approval rating of 100%, based on 7 critics' reviews.

Jack Seale, for The Guardian, gave the third series 4 out of 5 stars. He called the series "superlative drama", and "Its latest series is a seriously impressive feat". James Hibbs, in the Radio Times, gave it 5 out of 5 stars, calling the series "Holliday Grainger's finest hour", and also singling out Killian Scott for praise, among other performances. He wrote "the best thriller on TV is back, back with a bang as it goes more ridiculous, but also more propulsive and mind-bending than ever before". Jacob Stolworthy, writing in The Independent, called it a "scarily prophetic series that deserves to be as adored as Luther and Line of Duty. James Croot wrote in New Zealand's Post: "Taking over from Line of Duty as the most compelling cutting-edge UK crime drama being made today, third time is very much the charm for this Ben Chanan show", and "Holliday Grainger's Rachel Carey is very much the heart and soul of The Capture".

Adam Sweeting, writing for The Arts Desk, points out some plot holes, but concludes "It's tense, rapid-fire viewing, absorbing enough to let you gloss over some riotous implausibilities which sometimes threaten to tip the entire production over a cliff". Anita Singh in The Telegraph also criticised the "ridiculous" storylines; however, she concludes "if you judge dramas on wanting to stick around and find out where the story is going, The Capture delivers". She gave the series 3 out of 5 stars.

=== Viewership ===
The Capture was the most requested new show in 2019 on BBC iPlayer, with more than 20 million requests for series 1. It was also the eighth most requested series overall in 2019.

=== Accolades ===
For his performance in the first series, Callum Turner received a nomination for the British Academy Television Award for Best Actor.
