= Francis Lovehall =

Jamaican-British actor

- Born: Jamaica
- Education: Royal Academy of Dramatic Art
- Occupation: Actor
- Television: Small Axe; Champion

Francis Lovehall is a Jamaican actor based in London.

== Early life ==
Lovehall was born and raised in Jamaica. He graduated from the Royal Academy of Dramatic Art (RADA) in 2019.

== Career ==
In 2020 Lovehall could be seen playing Reggie alongside Micheal Ward in Steve McQueen's Lovers Rock, part of his Small Axe anthology series.

In 2022 Lovehall appeared in Red Pitch at the Bush Theatre from Tyrell Williams. In October 2022, Lovehall was nominated for his performance in the Emerging Talent category at the Evening Standard Theatre Awards for his performance in Red Pitch.

In June 2023, Lovehall played Laurent in musical television series Champion by Candice Carty-Williams, for BBC One. That year, he was cast in Steven Knight 1880s-set drama television series A Thousand Blows. In December 2023, he could be seen in the Baby Keem film The Melodic Blue.

Lovehall portrayed England footballer Raheem Sterling in 2026 television drama series Dear England.

== Filmography ==
Key
†	Denotes works that have not yet been released

Year	Title	Role	Notes
2020	Small Axe	Reggie	Episode Lovers Rock
2022	Death on the Nile	Allerton Mcnaught	Film
2022	His Dark Materials	Samuel	1 episode
2023	Champion	Laurent	Series
2024	Masters of the Air	Capt. Wendell Oliver Pruitt	Series
2024	Criminal Record	Jason Reeve	2 episodes
2025	A Thousand Blows	Alec Munroe	Series
2026	Waiting for the Out	Dris	
2026	Dear England	Raheem Sterling	
