= Déja J Bowens =

English actress

Déja J. Bowens
- Born: December 1997 (age 28)
- Education: Mountview Academy of Theatre Arts
- Occupation: Actress
- Years active: 2022-
- Television: Champion

Déja J Bowens is a British actress and singer.

== Career ==
Bowens attended Mountview Academy of Theatre Arts in London, graduating in 2021. Her stage work has included playing Mamie in Marys Seacole by Jackie Sibblies Drury at the Donmar Warehouse in London in 2022

Bowens made her television debut playing the lead role of singer-songwriter Vita Champion in the 2023 Candice Carty-Williams television series Champion for BBC One. Prior to the series, Bowens had only previously publicly sang as part of her church choir. She told The Evening Standard she was not fully prepared for how much music she would have to perform on the show, but Hollie Richardson in The Guardian described it as “an exciting screen debut” for Bowens, and Anita Singh in The Daily Telegraph notably singled out Bowens for praise from a “talented cast”. Morgan Cormack writing for The Radio Times said “You wouldn't think Champion was the TV debut for leading actress Déja J Bowens” adding “she artfully manages to capture the audience's sympathy while also pulling off the performance of someone who has had to embody years of conflicting feelings”. The song My Girl, sung in show by Bowen's character Vita with Ray BLK’s character Honey, written by Ray BLK, was released as a single on 30 June 2023. Bowers won the Acting Performance at the Royal Television Society Midlands Television Awards in 2024.
