= CJ Skuse =

English novelist

- Born: Claire Joanna Skuse; 1980 (age 45–46); Weston-super-Mare, England
- Other names: C.J. Skuse; C J Skuse
- Education: Bath Spa University; University of Gloucestershire
- Occupation: Writer
- Years active: 2009–present

Claire Joanna Skuse (born 1980) is an English novelist and former lecturer. She began her career writing young adult (YA) fiction, publishing five novels, and was named a key figure in the "rise of YA antiheroines" by The Guardian. She then moved into adult thrillers with the release of Sweetpea (2017) and its sequels.

== Early life and education ==
Skuse was born in Weston-super-Mare to parents Jenny and Colin, who ran local pubs and hotels, including the Britannia Inn.

Skuse was 17 when she began writing and pitching to publishers. She completed BA (Creative English Studies) and an MA (Writing for Young People) at the Bath Spa University. She completed a PhD (Publication, 2025) at the University of Gloucestershire. She previously worked in a nursery during her studies and once had internships at the Weston Mercury and the County Gazette in Taunton.

== Career ==
=== Writing ===
After graduating from university, Skuse landed a job as a publishing assistant at The Chicken House in Frome, through which she published her debut young adult (YA) novel Pretty Bad Things, about 16-year-old twins who go on a petty crime spree. The novel won the inaugural 2011 Dumfries and Burgh Book Award. It was also shortlisted for Lancashire Book of the Year. This was followed by Skuse's second and third YA novels Rockoholic, about a fan of a rock band, and Dead Romantic, a modern Weird Science retelling. The latter was shortlisted for a 2014 BookTrust Best Book Award.

Skuse was credited in The Guardian with pioneering a "YA antiheroine" trend from the publication of Pretty Bad Things, and she wrote a 2015 article in the publication on her penchant for writing "angry girl" lead characters. Via HarperCollins and MIRA Ink, Skuse published her fourth and fifth YA novels Monsters (2015), a boarding school-set thriller, and The Deviants (2016), about an estranged friend group in a coastal town. The French translation of The Deviants won the 2017 Jean Monnet University Student Literary Prize.

In 2016, HQ (a Harlequin and HarperCollins imprint) acquired the rights to publish Skuse's first adult novel Sweetpea in 2017. The dark comedy thriller is told through the diary entries of character Rhiannon Lewis, a wallflower-appearing compulsive serial killer. Skuse then published a sequel In Bloom in 2018.

In the interim, Skuse published a standalone adult thriller novel The Alibi Girl, also via HQ in 2020, about a woman who assumes multiple identities.

Skuse returned to the Sweetpea series in 2021 with a third instalment Dead Head. This was followed by the fourth and fifth novels in the series Thorn in My Side and The Bad Seeds in 2023 and 2024 respectively. Darling Bud, published in 2026, would be set in the Sweetpea universe.

In 2026, Skuse signed a three-book deal with Canelo and Bolinda Publishing for her next crime novel Dirty Harriet.

=== Academia ===
In 2011, Skuse became a senior lecturer in Creative Writing at her alma mater Bath Spa University. She was a 2021–2022 Royal Literary Fund (RLF) Fellow of the University of Exeter.

== Adaptation ==
Ahead of the release of Sweetpea in 2017, See-Saw Films optioned the rights to adapt the novel for television. In 2020, it was announced Sky Atlantic had ordered 8 episodes of the series, with Kirstie Swain attached to pen the adaptation. Starring Ella Purnell as Rhiannon Lewis, the series was released in October 2024 with a second series due for transmission in late 2026.

== Bibliography ==
=== Sweetpea series ===
- Sweetpea (2017)
- In Bloom (2018)
- Dead Head (2021)
- Thorn in My Side (2023)
- The Bad Seeds (2024)
- Darling Bud: a companion novel to the Sweetpea series (2026)

=== Young adult novels ===
- Pretty Bad Things (2009)
- Rockoholic (2011)
- Dead Romantic (2013)
- Monster (2015)
- The Deviants (2016)

=== Adult novels ===
- The Alibi Girl (2020)
- Dirty Harriet (2027)
