= Sweetpea (TV series) =

2024 British dark comedy-drama television series

- Genre: Dark comedy; Comedy-drama; Thriller
- Created by: Kirstie Swain
- Based on: Sweetpea by CJ Skuse
- Written by: Kirstie Swain; Krissie Ducker; Laura Jayne Tunbridge; Selina Lim
- Directed by: Ella Jones
- Starring: Ella Purnell; Nicôle Lecky; Jon Pointing; Calam Lynch; Jeremy Swift; Dustin Demri-Burns; Leah Harvey; Camille Coduri
- Opening theme: "Do You See Me Now" by Chinchilla
- Composer: Isobel Waller-Bridge
- Country of origin: United Kingdom
- Original language: English
- No. of series: 1
- No. of episodes: 6

Production
- Executive producers: Ella Purnell; Ella Jones; Kirstie Swain; Helen Gregory; Iain Canning; Emile Sherman; Patrick Walters
- Producer: Zorana Piggott
- Cinematography: Nick Morris
- Editors: Lucien Clayton; Jo Walker
- Running time: 41–50 minutes
- Production companies: See-Saw Films; Sky Studios

Original release
- Network: Sky Atlantic
- Release: 10 October 2024 – present

Sweetpea is a British dark comedy drama television series created by Kirstie Swain, based on the 2017 novel by CJ Skuse. It stars Ella Purnell in the lead role and premiered on 10 October 2024 on Sky Atlantic. In December 2024, it was renewed for a second series, which is set to premiere on 26 November 2026.

== Premise ==
Having endured bullying during her school years, Rhiannon Lewis is an unassuming young woman who lives with her father and dog in the fictional English town of Carnsham, where she works a mundane job as an administrative assistant at a local newspaper. However, following her father's death, her life is upended by a series of unfortunate events, including the return of her former bully, leading Rhiannon to develop a penchant for murder.

In the second series, alongside a promotion, an irresistible rebound, and a killer intent on unmasking her, Rhiannon wonders if her ex, AJ Pierce, was right about her being a monster.

== Cast and characters ==
=== Main ===
- Ella Purnell as Rhiannon Lewis, an administrative assistant working at the Carnsham Gazette, often called "Sweetpea" by her boss
- Nicôle Lecky as Julia Blenkingsopp (series 1), a classmate from Rhiannon's school years, who is now a local estate agent
- Jon Pointing as Craig, an employee at Rhiannon's father's construction company who ghosted her after their one-night stand
- Calam Lynch as AJ Pierce (series 1), the new junior reporter at the Carnsham Gazette
- Jeremy Swift as Norman, the editor of the Carnsham Gazette and Rhiannon's boss
- Dustin Demri-Burns as Jeff Barker (series 1), a senior reporter at the Carnsham Gazette
- Leah Harvey as Marina Farrar, a junior detective working for the local police force
- Camille Coduri as Carol on Tuesdays (series 1), the hostess at the local pub
- Tamsin Greig as Liv (series 2), AJ's mother
- Rish Shah as Gabriel (series 2)
- Taj Atwal as Freya (series 2), Rhiannon's new boss at the Carnsham Gazette
- Jenny Walser as Daisy (series 2)

=== Recurring ===
- Dino Kelly as Marcus Rebac (series 1), Julia's fiancé
- Nitin Ganatra as Rory, a detective working with Marina
- Ingrid Oliver as Diana St John, a Detective Inspector at the local police force

=== Guest ===
- David Bark-Jones as Tommy Lewis (series 1), Rhiannon and Seren's father, and owner of the construction firm Tommy's Transformations
- Luke McGibney as Mike Roberts (series 1), an obnoxious man who crosses paths with Rhiannon
- Alexandra Dowling as Seren, Rhiannon's older sister who lives in France
- James Craze as Ryan Lloyd (series 1) a man who disrespects Rhiannon

== Episodes ==
No.	Title	Directed by	Written by	Original release date
1	"Sorry for Your Loss"	Ella Jones	Kirstie Swain	10 October 2024
Rhiannon Lewis is a downtrodden wallflower receptionist at the Carnsham Gazette who has lived a life marked by bullying and neglect. Traumatised by years of abuse at school from popular classmate Julia Blenkingsopp, she developed trichotillomania and harbors violent fantasies. Her only source of support is her father Tommy, who encourages her to assert herself, but his death while hospitalised leaves her devastated. Soon after, Rhiannon is passed over for a promotion in favour of new reporter AJ Pierce. Her sister Seren decides to sell the family home and hires Julia, now an estate agent, to manage the sale. Distracted by a billboard advertising Julia's business, Rhiannon's dog Tink is struck and killed by a car. Drunk and angry, she confronts Julia at a nightclub and is dismissed. Later, a drunken man urinates on her near a canal, claiming he did not see her. Reaching her limit, Rhiannon stabs him with her father's pocketknife and disposes of the body in the canal, an act that gives her a newfound sense of confidence.
2	"This Sort of Thing Needs Some Feminine Energy"	Ella Jones	Kirstie Swain & Krissie Ducker	10 October 2024
After Tommy's death, his employee Craig offers to buy the family business. When the police find the body of the man Rhiannon killed, senior reporter Jeff Barker identifies him as Ryan Lloyd and contacts her. To stay ahead of him, Rhiannon persuades her boss Norman to send her and AJ to obtain a statement from Ryan's family. Although Ryan's mother describes him as an ideal son, Rhiannon discovers a restraining order in his bedroom and learns from former co-worker Dave Ferris that Ryan repeatedly bullied him. Julia later visits Rhiannon's house to value it. Rhiannon convinces Norman to publish a story revealing Ryan's bullying, which leads to her being invited out for drinks with colleagues. At the pub, the police arrive to question people about Ryan's murder. Rhiannon recognises a man who had caused a disturbance at the hospital, preventing a nurse from attending her dying father. She follows him into an alley and kills him with a knife. On her way home, she stops in front of a poster advertising Julia and thinks about killing her.
3	"Black Spots in the Garage"	Ella Jones	Kirstie Swain & Krissie Ducker	10 October 2024
Rhiannon plans to kill Julia and sabotages Jeff by spiking his coffee after realising she was not credited for the Ryan Lloyd story. Ryan's mother confronts Rhiannon and AJ at the Gazette, accusing them of betrayal, but Rhiannon maintains that Ryan was a bully. Rhiannon later has dinner with Craig and they sleep together. Detectives Marina and Rory question Rhiannon because she was near a nightclub on the night of Ryan's murder, and she claims she was there with friends, naming Julia as one of them. The body of Rhiannon's second victim is discovered. Rhiannon visits Tommy's Transformations to surprise Craig but finds him with Julia, who intends to buy Rhiannon's house and renovate it. Furious, Rhiannon steals Julia's phone and slashes her car tyre. She later offers Julia a lift home but instead takes her to Rhiannon's house, claiming there is mould in the garage. There, Rhiannon reveals she killed two men and demands an apology from Julia. Julia tries to escape but slips and falls, allowing Rhiannon to knock her unconscious.
4	"Everybody Loves Julia"	Ella Jones	Laura Jayne Tunbridge	10 October 2024
Rhiannon ties Julia up in her garage but does not kill her after Julia tells her she is responsible for her own unhappiness. At Tommy's Transformations, Rhiannon seduces Craig and steals a flash drive containing footage from the previous night. She persuades Norman to let her work as a junior reporter by writing an article about Julia's disappearance. Marina later reviews nightclub footage from the night of Ryan's murder and sees Rhiannon arguing with Julia. Rhiannon interviews Julia's fiancé Marcus at their home, where she secretly vandalises a couch and steals several items. Her article is published in the Gazette. AJ takes Rhiannon on a date, but leaves when Craig arrives and reveals he has been sleeping with her. Rhiannon later finds Marcus drunk and distraught over Julia's disappearance, drives him home, reads his messages to Julia, and confronts Julia with them. The texts show Marcus threatening suicide and accusing Julia of abuse, prompting Julia to break down and call Marcus abusive.
5	"Someone's Been a Naughty Girl"	Ella Jones	Selina Lim	10 October 2024
Julia apologises to Rhiannon for bullying her at school. Marina, suspecting Rhiannon, finds Julia's car at Tommy's Transformations and notices the footage is missing. Rhiannon persuades Craig to stay silent about her visit there the night Julia disappeared. At Julia's search party, Marina learns of Rhiannon and Julia's past, and Marcus threatens to have Rhiannon fired for vandalising his home. Rhiannon follows Marcus intending to kill him, but Jeff sees her and is later killed by traffic while fleeing. After Marcus threatens Rhiannon via text, she and Julia plan to frame him for the murders and Julia's kidnapping. At Julia and Marcus's unfinished house, they trigger the alarm, and Marcus arrives before Julia, who is tied up, uses a pocketknife to free herself while Rhiannon hides and calls the police. Marcus becomes violent, accusing Julia of sleeping with her kidnapper; Rhiannon intervenes, Julia declares she is leaving him, and when he threatens to jump from a balcony, Rhiannon pushes him to his death just before police arrive.
6	"Life 2.0"	Ella Jones	Krissie Ducker	10 October 2024
During police interrogations, Rhiannon and Julia each claim Marcus killed the two men and kidnapped Julia. Marina accuses Rhiannon of being the real killer but is reprimanded. Rhiannon and Julia celebrate at a nightclub, where Julia uses Rhiannon's bank card to buy drugs. Marina later breaks into Rhiannon's house and finds the footage showing Rhiannon slashing Julia's car tyre, but Rhiannon points out it was obtained illegally. Julia agrees to recount her kidnapping to the Gazette, creating tension with Rhiannon. Rhiannon breaks up with Craig, who blackmails her into selling Tommy's Transformations. That night, AJ visits Rhiannon and they have sex. The next morning, Rhiannon receives a £474 charge from British Airways and leaves Julia a voicemail about her bank card. AJ gets a police photo of the murder weapon, recognising Rhiannon's pocketknife. After Rhiannon confesses, AJ calls her a monster and tries to leave, prompting her to stab him repeatedly, and as he dies in her arms, Seren arrives at the door.

== Production ==
Skuse's 2017 novel was optioned in 2017 by See-Saw Films. In 2019, Sky Atlantic came onboard the project and Patrick Walters, Jamie Laurenson, Hakan Kousetta, Iain Canning and Emile Sherman were set as executive producer for See-Saw Films, with Liz Lewin as an executive producer for Sky Studios. Kirstie Swain has adapted the book. In 2020, it was revealed to be a six-part series.

On 3 December 2024, Sweetpea was renewed for a second series.

=== Writing ===
Selina Lim was the lead writer for the second series.

=== Casting ===
In November 2023, Ella Purnell was cast in the lead role and serves as an executive producer. Also cast were Nicôle Lecky, Jon Pointing, Calam Lynch, Leah Harvey, Jeremy Swift, Dustin Demri-Burns, Luke McGibney and Ingrid Oliver. In August 2025, Tamsin Greig, Rish Shah, Taj Atwal, and Jenny Walser were announced to have joined the cast for the second series.

=== Filming ===
Filming took place in Southend-on-Sea in November and December 2023, with filming locations including Southend Observation Tower on Pier Hill, Western Esplanade's Cliff Lift and theme park Adventure Island. Filming also took place near the River Colne in Oxhey Park, Watford.

Filming for the second series began in August 2025 and wrapped in November.

=== Title sequence ===
The title sequence was created by the London-based Peter Anderson Studio. It was designed to visually explore the lead character's psychological state, utilising brutalist painting aesthetics and painterly compositions. The sequence features neon lights on rain-soaked streets and transforms everyday objects into symbols of violence, reflecting the duality of her existence. A bespoke typeface, with a hand-drawn aesthetic, contributes to the gritty tone whilst the sharp extensions in the typeface used in the title card were added to enhance the ominous atmosphere.

The title sequence won a Bafta in the category 'TV Craft / Titles & Graphic Identity' in 2025.

== Broadcast ==
Ahead of the series premiere, a full trailer was released in September 2024. The series premiered on 10 October 2024 on Sky Atlantic and Now in the United Kingdom. On the same day in the United States, the series premiered on Starz.

The second series is due to premiere on 26 November 2026 in the UK and in early 2027 in the United States.

== Reception ==
On the review aggregator website Rotten Tomatoes, Sweetpea holds an approval rating of 88% based on 25 reviews, with an average rating of 7/10. The website's consensus reads: "Ella Purnell is a diabolical delight in Sweetpea, a revenge fantasy that holds a lot of darkness beneath its playful exterior." Metacritic, which uses a weighted average, assigned a score of 69 out of 100 based on 12 critics, indicating "generally favorable" reviews.

Lucy Mangan, writing in The Guardian, was less impressed, comparing the series unfavourably to the original book.

== Soundtrack ==
The series score was written by Isobel Waller-Bridge, and the theme song ("Do You See Me Now") by Isobel and Chinchilla, who also provided the vocals.

In addition, the series features a diverse soundtrack of popular music, including tracks from Billie Eilish, Icona Pop (ft. Charli XCX), Labi Siffre, and the Spice Girls.
