= The Custom of the Country (film) =

- Directed by: Josie Rourke
- Screenplay by: Josie Rourke
- Based on: The Custom of the Country by Edith Wharton
- Produced by: Charles Finch; Sydney Sweeney; Alison Owen; Mickey Liddell; Pete Shilaimon
- Starring: Sydney Sweeney; Leo Woodall
- Cinematography: Ruben Impens
- Production companies: StudioCanal; Rabbit's Foot Films; Monumental Pictures; LD Entertainment
- Distributed by: StudioCanal
- Countries: United States; United Kingdom
- Language: English

The Custom of the Country is an upcoming tragicomedy film written and directed by Josie Rourke, based on the 1913 novel by Edith Wharton.

== Premise ==
An ambitious woman moves from the Midwest to New York City, looking to climb the city's social ladder.

== Cast ==
- Sydney Sweeney as Undine Spragg
- Leo Woodall
- Josh Finan as Ralph Marvell
- Louis Garrel
- Matthew Goode
- Rose Leslie
- Martha Plimpton
- Irène Jacob
- Hugh Dancy
- Ian Hart
- James McArdle
- Rosie Sheehy
- Louisa Harland
- Ronkẹ Adékọluẹ́jọ́
- Dominic West
- Miranda Richardson
- Pedro Nazare
- Florence Dobson as Pauline
- Oliver Möller

== Production ==
In October 2014, it was announced the Edith Wharton novel was being developed as a miniseries by producer Charles Finch for Sony Pictures TV, with Scarlett Johansson set to star in and executive produce. This iteration of the adaptation ultimately did not proceed forward, with an announcement in May 2020 that Sofia Coppola was now developing the series for Apple TV+. Florence Pugh was set to star, however the project was cancelled in 2021. In a 2024 interview with The New Yorker, Coppola stated Apple TV+ cancelled the project as they found the main character too "unlikeable". In 2026, she revealed that she had wanted Jennifer Lawrence for the role originally and attributed budgetary issues for the Pugh version, saying: "In my head, she's Undine. I think it required a big star and a big budget, so that iteration didn't happen."

In October 2024, €600,000 in funding from the German fund Film- und Medienstiftung was announced for a film adaptation directed by Josie Rourke in a German-UK co-production with Finch’s Rabbit's Foot Films. In January 2026, it was announced that StudioCanal would fully finance and release the film, with Sydney Sweeney set to star. Sweeney joined StudioCanal, Finch, and Alison Owen of Monumental Pictures as producers. Rourke stated that she had Sweeney in mind for the role of Undine while writing the screenplay. In February, Leo Woodall joined the cast. Josh Finan, Louis Garrel, Matthew Goode, Rose Leslie, Martha Plimpton, and Irène Jacob were among those added to the cast in March, while LD Entertainment was announced as a producer, having pre-purchased North American distribution rights.

Filming began in February 2026, with production occurring in Portugal. Ruben Impens serves as cinematographer.
