= Josh Finan =

English actor

- Born: Wirral, England
- Education: Bristol Old Vic Theatre School
- Occupation: Actor
- Years active: 2017–present
- Television: The Responder

Josh Finan is a British actor. On television, he is known for his roles in the BBC One series The Responder (2022–2024) and Waiting for the Out (2026), and the FX series Say Nothing (2024).

== Early life and education ==
Josh Finan is from the Wirral. After being cast in Say Nothing, Finan traced his Irish ancestry to a great-grandfather born in Newry.

He studied English literature at the University of Sheffield and later trained in acting at the Bristol Old Vic.

== Career ==
Finan's stage work has included Southbury Child at the Bridge Theatre and Peggy For You at Hampstead Theatre. He also appeared in productions for the Royal Shakespeare Company including Romeo and Juliet and Macbeth in 2018.

He appeared in BBC One drama series The Responder in 2022, and reprised the role for the second series in 2024.

In 2024, he could be seen in the Netflix shows The Gentlemen as Jethro, and as Diggsy in Baby Reindeer. He plays the younger Gerry Adams in the 2024 Disney+ drama series Say Nothing, set in Northern Ireland during The Troubles.

Finan had the lead role as philosophy teacher Dan in BBC One drama series Waiting for the Out, broadcast in January 2026. In 2026, he also appeared in Netflix comedy drama series How to Get to Heaven from Belfast.

== Recognition ==
For his performance in series 1 of The Responder, Finan was nominated for British Academy Television Award for Best Supporting Actor.

== Filmography ==
Key
†	Denotes works that have not yet been released

Year	Title	Role	Notes
2017	Guerrilla	Aidan	Episode 1.3
2017	The Current War	Peter	
2019	Hellboy	Novice	
2020	Leaving the Forces	Sebastian Bell	Short
2020	Surge	Jermaine	
2020	Doctors	Aaron Rafferty	Episode: "Comeback"
2020	Stile	Poor Boy	
2021	Shook by Samuel Bailey	Cain	
2022- 2024	The Responder	Marco	10 episodes
2024	The Gentlemen	Jethro	4 episodes
2024	Baby Reindeer	Diggsy	2 episodes
2024	Say Nothing	Gerry Adams	7 episodes
2025	Black Mirror	Lump	Episode "Plaything"
2026	Waiting for the Out	Dan	Lead role
2026	How to Get to Heaven from Belfast	Jason/Andrew	
TBA	The Custom of the Country †		Filming
