= Nima Taleghani =

British actor and playwright

- Born: London, England
- Education: University of Warwick; University College London
- Occupations: actor playwright

Nima Taleghani is a British actor and playwright. He is known for his role as Youssef Farouk in Heartstopper and is the first playwright to have a debut play staged at the Royal National Theatre's Olivier Theatre.

== Early life ==
Taleghani was born and raised on Elthorne estate in Archway, North London. His parents emigrated to the United Kingdom from Iran before he was born. He studied drama under Vivienne Franzmann. Following sixth form, Taleghani studied English literature at the University of Warwick. He went on to earn a master's degree in English from the University College London.

== Career ==
Taleghani is an established stage actor and had roles in numerous theatre productions directed by Jamie Lloyd, including Cyrano de Bergerac and Romeo and Juliet. He also acted in The Merry Wives of Windsor for the Royal Shakespeare Company, Hope Has a Happy Meal at the Royal Court Theatre, Macbeth at the Royal Exchange Manchester, Armadillo at The Yard Theatre, The Plough and the Stars at Abbey Theatre, and The White Whale for Slung Low.

Taleghani is the first playwright to have a debut play staged at the Royal National Theatre's Olivier Theatre, a rap-infused version of the Greek tragedy The Bacchae.

He played the role of Youssef Farouk in the Netflix coming-of-age romantic comedy drama television series Heartstopper. He also had television roles in Hatton Garden, Waiting for the Out, Danny Boy, and Causality. Taleghani has also had film roles in Femme, 90 Minutes, and Dublin Oldschool. He reprised his role as Youssef Farouk in the film Heartstopper Forever.
