= The Custom of the Country =

1913 novel by Edith Wharton

- Author: Edith Wharton
- Language: English
- Genre: Novel
- Publisher: Charles Scribner's Sons
- Publication date: October 21, 1913
- Publication place: United States
- Preceded by: The Reef
- Followed by: Summer

The Custom of the Country is a 1913 tragicomedy of manners novel by the American author Edith Wharton. It tells the story of Undine Spragg, a Midwestern young woman who attempts to ascend the social ladder through ruthlessness, seduction, vanity, and manipulation in early 20th-century New York City society.

== Synopsis ==
The story opens in the early 20th century introducing the Spraggs, a family of newly wealthy midwesterners from Apex City (a fictional city in Wisconsin), arrive in New York City to advantageously marry off their beautiful, ambitious, and temperamental daughter Undine. Attracted to glamour and extravagance, Undine has a hard time making inroads into the high status old money social circles she wishes to enter. Her beauty catches the attention of several men who offer her a tantalizing glimpse into their world.

Ralph Marvell, who is descended from the Dagonets, an old money family, becomes attracted to her. Convinced that Undine is a simple and plain-spoken girl who would be ruined by her elevation in society, he resolves to quickly woo and marry her. However, Marvell is an unsuccessful lawyer and a would-be poet, and his family no longer has great reserves of cash. Before the marriage, Marvell's grandfather informs Mr. Spragg that Spragg will have to financially support the couple. Mr. Spragg asks Undine to end her engagement, but Undine refuses to leave Ralph, and her father consents to the marriage.

A mysterious and coarse man named Elmer Moffatt shows up in New York City, and makes himself known to Mr. Spragg and to Undine. He insinuates having had some prior unspecified relationship with Undine in Apex. Undine begs him not to make their former relationship known as it could compromise her relationship with Ralph. Elmer agrees, but later he approaches Mr. Spragg and leverages the fact that the Spraggs want to silence him to try to coerce Mr. Spragg into a business deal that he says will profit them both greatly. After Moffat speaks to her, Undine insists that her wedding to Ralph happen right away, which puts further financial strain on Mr. Spragg.

Ralph and Undine honeymoon in Europe. Although Ralph dotes on Undine, their relationship quickly comes into conflict. Neither one of them enjoys the other's activities and his attempts to be a moderating influence on her extravagance are ignored. Worst of all his finances do not permit the lifestyle Undine desires. After Undine's father is unable to send them money Undine forces Ralph to extract money from his sister and her husband which Ralph resents. At the end of their honeymoon Undine discovers that she is pregnant. She is horrified by the news and Ralph realizes he is as well.

Four years later, Undine misses her son Paul's birthday, causing Ralph to realize that he is no longer in love with her. The couple are deeply in debt due to Undine. She resents Ralph for his lack of funds, and he resents her for forcing him to work. Unable to cover her bills, Undine accepts a loan from Peter Van Degen, the nouveau riche husband of Ralph's cousin Clare. Peter is a known philanderer, and Undine flirts with him, hoping that an affair will extract more financial aid. However, when Peter abruptly leaves for France, Undine realizes that she would be happier if she divorced Ralph and married Peter. Undine fakes an illness so that Ralph will send her to France to recover. While there, she convinces Peter to leave Clare and marry her.

After Undine and Ralph's divorce, Peter reunites with Clare and refuses to see Undine. She later learns from a friend that, while Clare never would have agreed to a divorce, the reason that Peter dropped Undine was that he discovered Ralph was deeply ill and his family was pleading for her to come home, which she ignored. Peter's fear that Undine would do the same to him (were he to fall sick) led him to end their relationship.

Her circumstances and social status greatly reduced, Undine returns to Paris, where she is fortunate enough to meet Raymond de Chelles, a French count, who falls in love with Undine. The de Chelles are Catholics and frown upon Undine's marriage and divorce. Undine discovers that an annulment is possible but does not have the financial means to procure one. She runs into Elmer Moffat who suggests that she use her legal hold on her son Paul to extract the money from Ralph.

Ralph, whose family has been raising Paul since his divorce, is shocked to discover that Undine now wants him to live in France with her. His cousin Clare points out that, rather than legally fight for custody, he should offer Undine a large amount of money to keep Paul. Ralph borrows from his inheritance and goes to Elmer Moffat in the hope of doubling his money. However the funds do not come through in time, and at the same time, Elmer informs him that he and Undine were married years ago in Apex. In shock and grief, Ralph commits suicide. His son is his sole heir, and when the funds Ralph invested finally do come through, they are controlled entirely through Undine who, through Ralph's death, is able to marry Raymond.

Undine is soon dissatisfied with Raymond, too. The de Chelles are hidebound aristocrats, their wealth tied in land and art and antiques that they will not consider selling, and Undine cannot adjust to the staid customs of upper-class French society. She also resents having to spend most of her time in the country because her husband cannot pay for expensive stays, entertainment, and shopping trips in Paris.

Undine at last runs into Elmer Moffat, now extremely wealthy and successful. They renew their acquaintance, and Undine realizes that he is the only man she really loved. She suggests that they begin an affair, which will be tolerated by her husband and his family as long as they are discreet. To her surprise, Elmer refuses and insists that he will only renew their relationship if she divorces Raymond and marries him.

Now, married to the crass midwestern businessman who was best suited to her in the first place, Undine finally has everything she ever desired. Still, it is clear that she wants even more: In the last paragraph of the novel, she imagines what it would be like to be an ambassador's wife, a position closed to her owing to her divorces.

== Characters ==
- Undine Spragg, an attractive and beautiful but ruthless, seductive, vain, and manipulative young woman from the Midwest who moves to New York City, the protagonist and anti-heroine of the novel
- Mr. Abner E. Spragg, Undine's father, a financier; he is manipulated by Moffatt to invest in his career
- Mrs. Leota B. Spragg, Undine's mother, a housewife
- Elmer Moffatt, a cunning financier from Apex whom Undine marries, then divorces, and remarries
- Ralph Marvell, a New York society gentleman who marries Undine, has a son with her and is divorced by her
- Peter Van Degen, a man with whom Undine has an affair
- Clare Van Degen, married to Van Degen, unhappy with their marriage; she is Ralph Marvell's cousin who is deeply in love with him
- Charles Bowen, an elderly man from New York City, who acts as a kind of observer; friend of Laura Fairford
- Raymond De Chelles, a French aristocrat who marries Undine after she is widowed; he is her third husband
- Paul Marvell, Undine's and Ralph's child, Raymond's stepson
- Laura Fairford, Ralph Marvell's sister; due to the customs of the era, she needed to invite Undine to dinner in order for Ralph to indirectly see her again
- Henley Fairford, the husband to Laura Fairford
- Claud Walsingham Popple, a painter who paints a portrait of Undine
- Mrs. Heeny, a masseuse who initially keeps company with Undine and Mrs. Spragg and later with Undine and her son; she also keeps clippings of all high society events
- Indiana Rolliver, a minor character in the novel who was a former actress who becomes involved in New York City's high society, and much like Undine, tries to navigate the social ladder
- Mr. Paul Dagonet, Ralph Marvell's old-money relative who represents the noble and aristocratic values of New York City
- Mrs. Eugenia Shallum, a nouveau rich woman who helps secure Undine's position and social status
- Princess Estradina, a European noblewoman, and aristocrat who appears during Undine's visit in Paris, France. She is a minor character who represents the old-world nobility, and social class that Undine wishes to join during her stay in France
- Madame Augusta Adelschein, a wealthy and aristocratic widow, and represents the old-money elite of New York City's high society
- Celeste, the Spragg family's French maid
- Jim Driscoll, non-descript heir to the Driscoll fortune who is eventually appointed Ambassador from the U.S to England

== Analysis ==
=== Title ===
The title phrase is discussed in the novel. Charles Bowen asserts to Laura Fairford that it is "abnormal" but typically American that Ralph Marvell does not tell Undine that her extravagances are forcing him to work too hard. Bowen says Marvell does not "let her share in the real business of life" nor "rely on her judgment and help in the conduct of serious affairs". Bowen believes that this behavior is typical of American men who, unlike European men, spend money on their wives but undervalue them as individuals, while living passionately in their business lives. To do otherwise in America, Bowen says, would unfortunately be "against the custom of the country". (Chapter XV)

Edith Wharton said the title of the novel came from a play by English playwrights John Fletcher and Philip Massinger, titled The Custom of the Country, in which the term referred to the French expression droit du seigneur, the claim of a ruler to have sex with a subordinate female before her husband.

=== Vanity in The Custom of the Country ===
Undine Spragg in The Custom of the Country acts as if she is entitled to a rich, luxurious lifestyle. One scholar writes: "Her rise through the ranks of New York society from the nouveau riche demonstrates her ability to use marriage and divorce in order to achieve her desire for social dominance." Undine has allowed a "consumerist society" to shape her personalities as the scenery changes throughout the book. "Wharton personifies consumer culture through Undine Spragg, demonstrating how individual agency gets lost when involved in the system."

=== Undine's name ===
The word "undine" was coined by the influential Renaissance-era philosopher Paracelsus, who used it for female water spirits.

Ralph Marvell recognizes the poetry in the name and assumes it refers to the poetic French phrase "divers et ondoyant" meaning "diverse and undulating". Mrs. Spragg responds by explaining the mundane origins of her daughter's name. Undine was named for "a hair-waver her father put on the market the week she was born", itself taken from "UNdoolay, you know, the French for crimping". (Chapter V) The phrase appears in Montaigne's essay "By diverse means we arrive at the same end": "Truly man is a marvelously vain, diverse and undulating object. It is hard to found any constant and uniform judgment on him."

== In popular culture ==
Julian Fellowes has cited The Custom of the Country as an inspiration for his creative work, including Downton Abbey. Upon receiving the Edith Wharton Lifetime Achievement Award in 2012 in Boston, Massachusetts, Fellowes said: "It is quite true that I felt this was my book; that the novel was talking to me in a most extreme and immediate way. I think it's a remarkable piece of writing. In Undine Spragg, Wharton has created an anti-heroine absolutely in the same rank as Becky Sharp, Scarlett O'Hara, or Lizzie Eustace. Undine has no values except ambition, greed and desire, and yet through the miracle of Wharton's writing, you are on her side. That's what's so extraordinary about the book...I decided, largely because of her work, that it was time I wrote something."

A forthcoming film adaptation, The Custom of the Country, starring Sydney Sweeney as Undine, began filming in February 2026.
