= Ginny Holder =

British actress

- Occupation: Actor

Ginny Holder is an actress best known for playing Thandie Abebe-Griffin on the BBC medical drama series Holby City. In 1999 she played in Wing Commander. Holder appeared in various British TV series, including The Bill and The Capture. In 2022, she joined as a regular on Death in Paradise as Darlene Curtis. She also played in 20 episodes of Family Affairs. Holder had also a career as stage actress.

== Filmography ==
Year	Title	Role	Notes
1994	Crocodile Shoes	Sue Nbokei	TV mini-series, 3 of 7 episodes
1994	The Bill	Paula Waite	TV series, 1 episode
1996	The Leading Man	Georgina	feature film
1996	Crucial Tales	Lena	TV mini-series, 1 of 4 episodes
1997	No Child of Mine	Bridget	TV film
1997	The Bill	Harriet Godsell	TV series, 1 episode
1997	The Saint	Jamaican Video Girlfriend	feature film
1998	Her Own Rules	Agnes	TV film
1999	Wing and a Prayer	Stephanie Boavi	TV series, 1 episode
1999	Wing Commander	Lt. Rosie Forbes	feature film
1999	A Touch of Frost	Naomi Barber	TV series, 1 episode
1999	Maisie Raine	Kath	TV series, 1 episode
1999	An Unsuitable Job for a Woman	Cheyney	TV series, 1 episode
2000	The Bill	Cherry Alexander	TV series, 1 episode
2000	Headless	Claire Brennan	TV series, 1 episode
2001	Murder in Mind	Caroline	TV series, 1 episode
2002	Family Affairs	Rosa Marshall	TV series, 20 episodes
2003	Holby City	Beth Oliver	TV series, 2 episodes
2003	Doctors	Laura Sawyer	TV series, 1 episode
2004	The Last Client	Trina	short film
2004	Murphy's Law	Nina Hendrix	TV series, 1 episode
2005	Blake's Junction 7	Dayna	short film
2005	Manderlay	Elisabeth	feature film
2007, 2010	Holby City	Thandie Abebe, later Thande Abebe-Griffin	TV series, 37 episodes
2008	No Heroics	TV Reporter	TV series, 1 episode
2010	The Protectors	Faela	TV series, 2 episodes
2015	Doctors	Serena Taylor	TV series, 1 episode
2015	DCI Banks	Dr. Sophie Hatfield	TV series, 1 episode
2016	London Has Fallen	EMT / MED Dept. Head	feature film
2016	Wyrdoes	Lady Macbeth	short film
2018–2025	Death in Paradise	Darlene Curtis	TV series, 22 episodes
2019–2022	The Capture	DS Nadia Latif	TV series, 9 episodes
2020	Shakespeare & Hathaway: Private Investigators	Michelle Oswald	Episode 3.2 "See Thyself, Devil!"
2021	Ragdoll	Therapist	TV series
2024	Midsomer Murders	Lila Blundell	Episode 24.1 "The Devil’s Work!"
