= Bellah (singer) =

British-Nigerian singer-songwriter and actress

- Born: Isobel Eferuwho Winset Abisola Yetunde Akpobire; Enfield, London, England
- Genre: R&B
- Occupations: Musician; actress
- Instrument: Vocals
- Years active: 2019–present
- Website: ibebellah.com

Isobel Eferuwho Winset Abisola Yetunde Akpobire, known professionally as Bellah, is a British-Nigerian singer, songwriter, and actress. She has released five EPs and numerous singles, and she starred in the 2024 television miniseries Queenie.

== Early life and career beginnings ==
Akpobire was born in Enfield, North London, England. She grew up as an only child to a single mother and lived with her uncles, who influenced her musical tastes by playing 1990s R&B, such as Destiny's Child and SWV.

Akpobire began participating in musical theatre at the age of four and recorded her first studio cover, "Be Without You" by Mary J. Blige, aged ten. After attending a Beyoncé concert seven years later, Akpobire realised she wanted to pursue music professionally and wrote her first song, at the age of 17. She performed Beyoncé's "Flawless" at a school talent show and received an invitation to perform at a local festival, where she found a management team.

== Career ==
=== 2019–2023 ===
In 2019, under the name Bellah, Akpobire released her debut EP, Last Train Home. The first single, "Never Loved", was named Track of the Week by BBC Radio 1Xtra. This was followed by the EPs In the Meantime and The Art of Conversation, both in 2020, the second of which was released by the London-based independent record label Marathon Artists.

In 2021, Bellah performed her single "Evil Eye" on the ColorsxStudios platform, garnering over a million views. According to her, the video of her performance "opened so many doors for me, so many opportunities. I got into the rooms of so many amazing creatives after that". That same year, she was a supporting act for Tems's headline tour.

In 2022, Bellah performed on the main stage at several large venues, including Wireless Festival and Strawberries and Creem, The same year, she released her third EP, Adultsville, which was executive-produced by Grammy Award winner Ari PenSmith. To promote it, Bellah announced her first headline tour, for which pre-sale tickets sold out within minutes.

Bellah was nominated for Best R&B/Soul Act at the MOBO Awards in 2021 and 2023.

=== 2024–present ===
In 2024, she was nominated for Best New International Act at the BET Awards.

In June, Bellah starred as the character Kyazike Mayagenda in the British television series Queenie, which aired on Channel 4 and Hulu.

On 27 March 2026, she released the eight-track EP State of Emergency Vol. 1, her fifth to date.

== Personal life ==
Akpobire has sickle cell disease and used her single "Cause U Can" to help raise awareness of the condition.

== Discography ==
=== EPs ===
Title	Year	Label
Last Train Home	2019	AWAL
In the Meantime	2020	AWAL
The Art of Conversation	2020	Marathon Artists
Adultsville	2022	Marathon Artists
State of Emergency Vol. 1	2026	Sonitus Recordings

=== Singles ===
Title	Year	Album
"Never Love"	2019	Last Train Home
"Peanut Butter Hazel"	2019	Last Train Home
"Drip"	2019	Last Train Home
"Something U Like"	2020	The Art of Conversation
"If I Were U"	2020	The Art of Conversation
"Missed Call"	2020	Non-album singles
"Evil Eye – A Colors Show"	2021	Non-album singles
"Evil Eye"	2021	Adultsville
"Prototype"	2022	Adultsville
"In the Moment"	2022	Adultsville
"Garden"	2022	Adultsville
"Options" (with Kamille & Tamera)	2023	Non-album singles
"Adultsville (Live)"	2023	Non-album singles
"As You Are – A Colors Show"	2023	Non-album singles
"Something to Prove"	2023	Non-album singles
"Need a Break"	2024	Non-album singles
"Motion Sickness"	2024	Non-album singles
"Boothang Bootcamp"	2025	State of Emergency Vol. 1
"Smoov"	2025	State of Emergency Vol. 1
"Typical" (with Destin Conrad)	2025	State of Emergency Vol. 1
