= Waiting for the Out =

British television series

- Release poster
- Based on: The Life Inside: A Memoir Of Prison, Family and Learning to be Free by Andy West
- Screenplay by: Dennis Kelly; Levi David Addai
- Directed by: Jeanette Nordahl; Ben Palmer
- Starring: Josh Finan; Francis Lovehall; Gerard Kearns; Samantha Spiro; Phil Daniels; Stephen Wight
- Music by: Sion Trefor
- Country of origin: United Kingdom
- Original language: English
- No. of series: 1
- No. of episodes: 6

Production
- Executive producers: Dennis Kelly; Jane Featherstone; Chris Fry; Katie Carpenter; Andy West; Tanya Qureshi
- Producers: Ken Horn; Louise Sutton
- Running time: 49 minutes
- Production company: Sister

Original release
- Network: BBC One
- Release: 3 January – 7 February 2026

Waiting for the Out is a British six-part television series based on Andy West's memoir The Life Inside: A Memoir of Prison, Family and Learning to Be Free, adapted for television by Dennis Kelly and Levi David Addai. It stars Josh Finan, Francis Lovehall, Gerard Kearns, Samantha Spiro, Phil Daniels, and Stephen Wight.

Waiting for the Out premiered on 3 January 2026 on BBC One, and received acclaim from critics.

== Cast and characters ==
- Josh Finan as Dan Stewer
- Stephen Wight as Lee Gifford
- Gerard Kearns as Dan's Dad
- Ronkẹ Adékọluẹ́jọ́ as Officer Stephens
- Neal Barry as Officer Guthrie
- Josef Altin as Greg Turner
- Steven Meo as Daniel 'Macca' McKenzie
- Ric Renton as Wallace Robson
- Tom Moutchi as Tom 'Junior' Kouame Jr
- Nima Taleghani as Malik Zahir
- Charlie Rix as Zac Colton
- Alex Ferns as Keith McKellar
- Sule Rimi as Samson Blake
- Jude Mack as Jessica Atherton
- Samantha Spiro as Dan's Mum
- Phil Daniels as Frank
- Francis Lovehall as Dris
- Sian Reese-Williams as Laura
- Daniel Monks as Jamie Lawson
- Sophia Brown as Natasha Morgan

== Production ==
=== Development ===
The series is produced by Sister. It is adapted from Andy West's memoir The Life Inside: A Memoir Of Prison, Family and Learning to be Free, adapted by writers Dennis Kelly, Levi David Addai and Ric Renton. The series is directed by Jeanette Nordahl and Ben Palmer, with Ken Horn and Louise Sutton serving as producers. The executive producers are Kelly, Jane Featherstone, Chris Fry, Katie Carpenter and West, with Tanya Qureshi for the BBC. For the series, Kelly visited a number of prisons in order to see West at work, and to try and discover a different way to depict prison on screen. Kelly said:

Very often when we have prison dramas they're very tense. They're about people getting stabbed or being extorted. It's not that those aspects aren't there but the truth is that a lot of what prison is about is waiting. You basically get a couple of hundred people, you put them in a building that they can't leave and they just have to wait.

=== Casting ===
The cast is led by Josh Finan alongside Francis Lovehall, Gerard Kearns, Samantha Spiro, Phil Daniels, Stephen Wight, Ronkẹ Adékoluẹjo, Neal Barry, Alex Ferns, Steven Meo, Ric Renton, Tom Moutchi, Nima Taleghani, Sule Rimi, Charlie Rix, and Jude Mack.

=== Filming ===
Principal photography took place in Liverpool in May 2025.

== Broadcast ==
It premiered on 3 January 2026 on BBC One, with all episodes made available on BBC iPlayer the same day.

== Reception ==
Writing for The Guardian Phil Harrison gave the series a five-star review describing it as a "gripping, moving study in vulnerability and acceptance", with praise for the "thoroughly well-written and performed characters". Nick Hilton in The Independent gave the show four stars and praised the performance of Josh Finan as teacher Dan, describing him as "a very delicate actor, moving neatly between inscrutability and distress". Carol Midgely in The Times reflected on the series being "nuanced, challenging, surprising and the most original prison drama I have seen" with Finan "an inspired piece of casting. It is a compelling performance".
