= Jude Mack =

British actress

- Education: London Academy of Music and Dramatic Art; University of Bristol
- Occupation: Actor
- Years active: 2018-present
- Television: Ted Lasso

Jude Mack is a British television and film actor and writer. Their credits include Ted Lasso (2026).

== Biography ==
A graduate of London Academy of Music and Dramatic Art, Mack also obtained a BA in English Literature from the University of Bristol.

Mack had a writing/performing partnership with Eliot Salt, with the pair screenwriting and performing comedy plays. In 2021, alongside Salt, Mack created, wrote and starred in BBC Three comedy pilot Amicable. In 2026, Mack was reported to be the creator behind a Netflix comedic thriller television series Feral, starring Jessica Gunning.

Mack's television acting credits include Apple TV series Prime Target, and BBC series The Capture, Waiting for the Out and Such Brave Girls, alongside James Norton in the ITV series Playing Nice, and I Hate Suzie for Sky Television. In 2025 they appeared in the Netflix series Back in Action and science-fiction film Mickey 17. In 2025, they also appeared in the LGBTQ+ comedy satire short film Bury Your Gays alongside Sophie Melville, amongst others, which was shortlisted for the Best British Award at that year's Iris Prize LGBTQ film festival.

In 2026, Mack could be seen portraying Katie "Boots" Quinn in season 4 of Ted Lasso for Apple TV, their character the goalkeeper for the Richmond Women's team, known for choosing to not wear goalkeeping gloves while she plays.

Mack uses they/them pronouns.

== Partial filmography ==
Key
†	Denotes works that have not yet been released

Year	Title	Role	Notes
2022	I Hate Suzie	Boo	2 episodes
2023	Such Brave Girls	Sid	2 episodes
2024	Peacock	Fran	1 episode
2025	Playing Nice	Tania	1 episode
2025	Back in Action	Daphne	Film
2025	Prime Target	Sophie Forster	2 episodes
2025	Mickey 17	Kai's new girlfriend	Film
2026	Waiting for the Out	Jessica Atherton	1 episode
2026	The Capture	Natasha Hayes	3 episodes
2026	Ted Lasso	Boots	Main cast (season 4)
