= Yolanda Mercy =

British actress and playwright

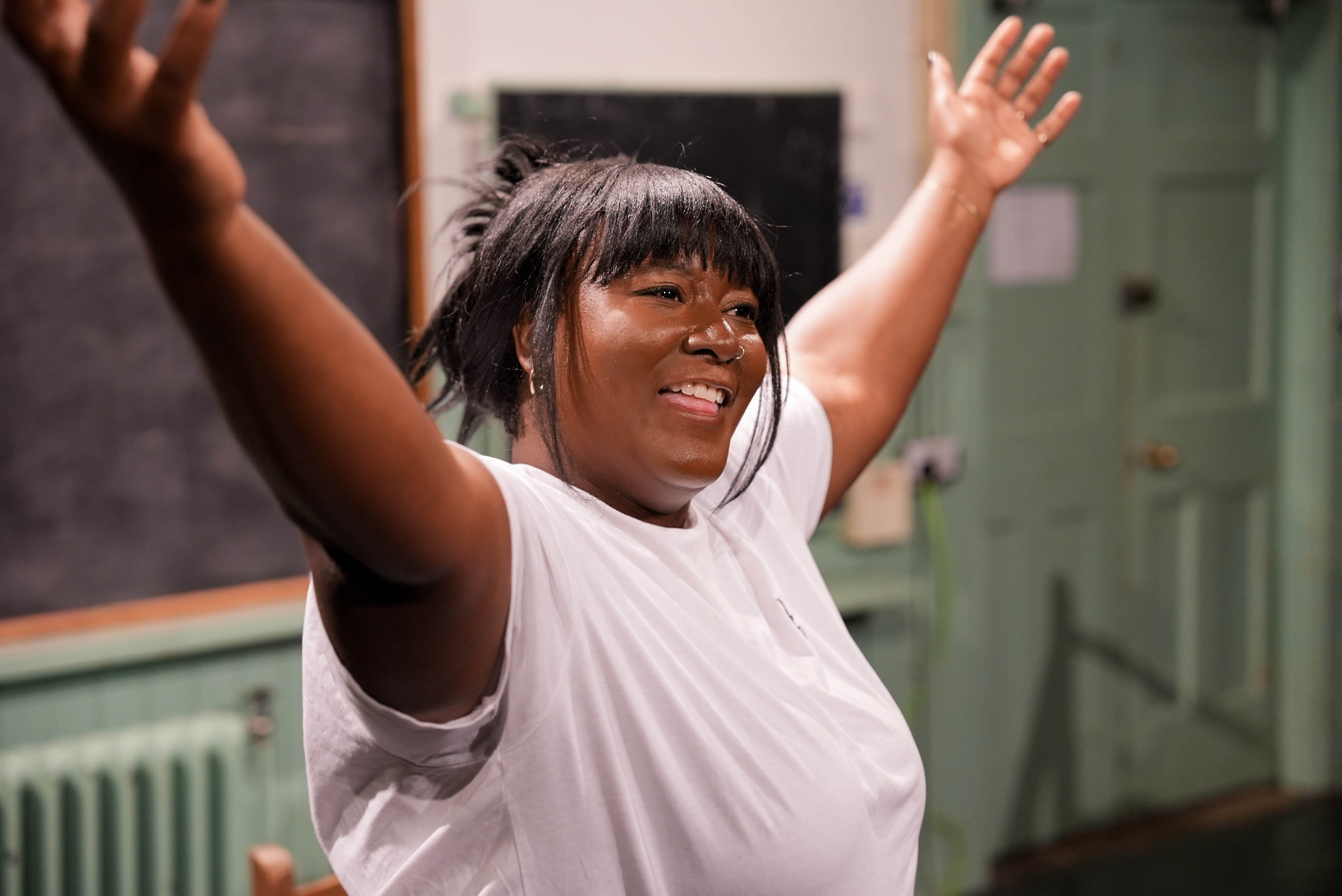
- Mercy at the 2024 Edinburgh Festival Fringe
- Born: London, England
- Education: Royal Academy of Dance; BRIT School for Performing Arts and Technology; Trinity Laban Conservatoire of Music and Dance; Royal Central School of Speech and Drama
- Occupations: Actress and playwright
- Known for: Quarter Life Crisis
- Website: www.yolandamercy.com

Yolanda Mercy is a British actress and playwright of Nigerian descent. In addition to her work as a writer and performer, she leads theatre workshops and mentors young artists.

She is currently an Associate Artist at Ovalhouse (previously resident at the Almeida Theatre and the Roundhouse), a Visiting Lecturer for Royal Central School of Speech and Drama and a trustee with the National Youth Arts Trust.

She has developed and toured with two solo shows, On The Edge of Me and Quarter Life Crisis. Quarter Life Crisis ran at the 2017 Edinburgh Fringe Festival in Edinburgh, Scotland, with support from Underbelly and their Underbelly Untapped programme.

Mercy is also a 2017 social ambassador for international ticketing platform TodayTix.

== Biography ==
Mercy was born in London to Nigerian parents.

She trained at the Royal Academy of Dance, where she studied ballet, and at the National Youth Theatre. She then attended the BRIT School for Performing Arts and Technology, Trinity Laban Conservatoire of Music and Dance (where she obtained a BA Hons in Dance Theatre), and Royal Central School of Speech and Drama (where she obtained a PGCert in Applied Theatre With Young People). Since then, she has performed and presented shows at several well-known British venues, including the Lyric Hammersmith, Battersea Arts Centre, Shakespeare's Globe, and the Almeida Theatre. Internationally, her credits include a creative residency at the Platonov Arts Festival in Voronezh, Russia.

== On The Edge Of Me ==
In 2015, Mercy won the Rich Mix "Small Story, Big City Emerging Artist Award", which helped her to develop On The Edge Of Me, her first solo show. On The Edge of Me is a dark comedy that uses audience participation, live music, and poetry to address a range of current topics including graduate unemployment and mental health issues.

As a result of successful performances at the Rich Mix and Paines Plough Roundabout, On The Edge of Me was picked up and developed further by the Soho Theatre and billed in their Soho Rising festival, which features emerging artists. On The Edge of Me was also selected for funding by the Arts Council England, O2 Think Big and Wandsworth Council. This piece sold out at the Soho Theatre, and was critically acclaimed.

On The Edge of Me has also been performed at The Rose Theatre Kingston, Paines Plough Roundabout, the Rich Mix, Time to Change, the Roundhouse, Soho Theatre, Upstairs at The Western, and most recently the Wandsworth Fringe.

== Quarter Life Crisis ==
In 2016, Mercy received a seed commission from OvalHouse, with support from Arc Stockton and Arts Council England, to develop a second solo show, which became Quarter Life Crisis. Originally titled Totally Unprepared, the show deals with young people's anxiety around becoming adults as well as exploring the London-born lead character's Nigerian heritage. After previews at OvalHouse and Arc Stockton, Quarter Life Crisis was selected by Underbelly Untapped to run at the 2017 Edinburgh Fringe Festival at the Underbelly Cowgate venue. The Edinburgh run received positive reviews and toured in the UK in 2017. In April 2018, an adapted version of Quarter Life Crisis, produced and directed by Caroline Raphael, was broadcast on BBC Radio 1Xtra.

== Writing career ==
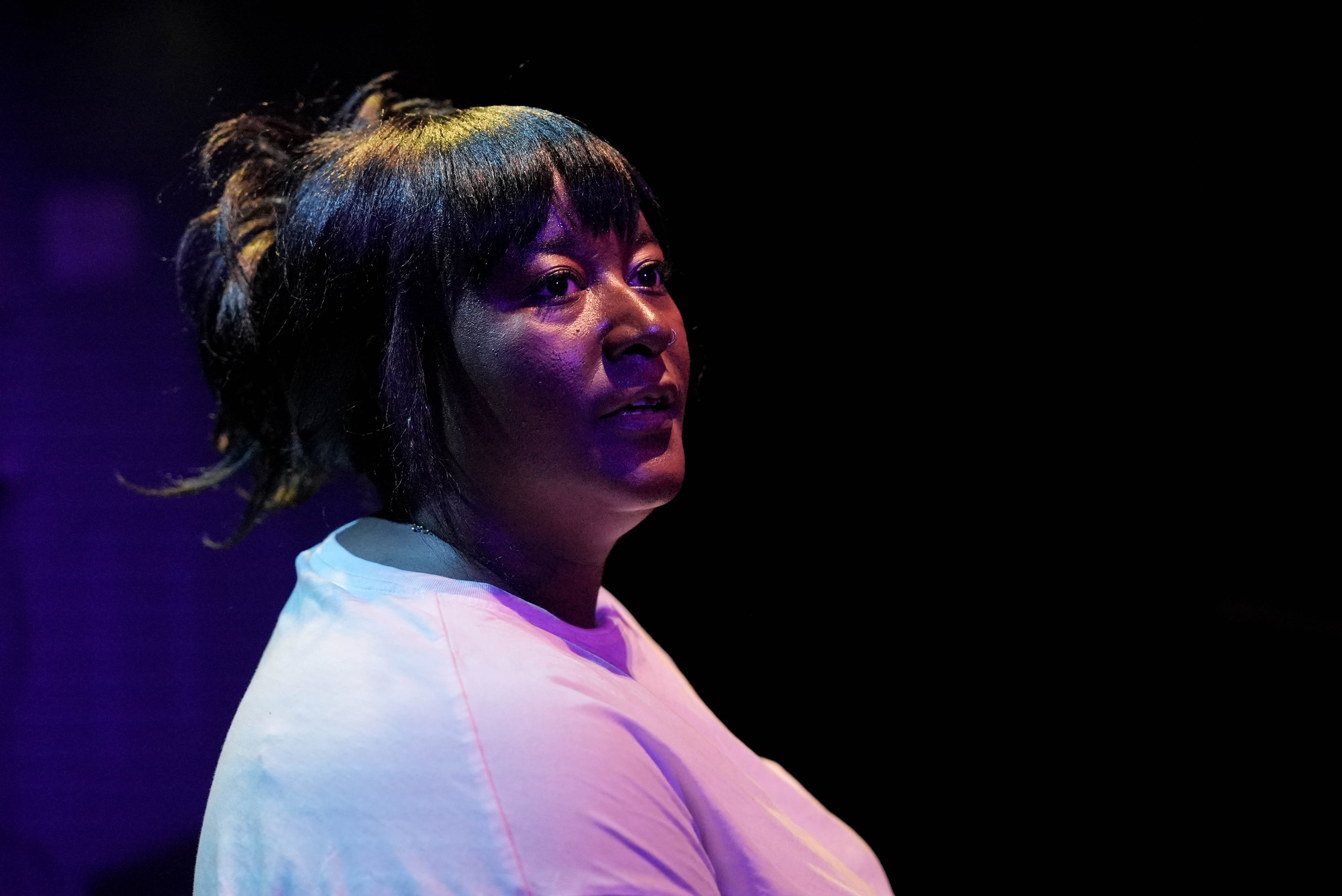
Mercy performing her one woman show, Failure Project, at the 2024 Edinburgh Festival Fringe.

In 2013, Mercy attended a writers' programme at the Lyric Hammersmith, followed by the Soho Theatre's programme, where she completed her first play, Him, Her, It and I. This work secured her a place on the Tamasha Playwrights programme. It was during her attachment to Tamasha that Mercy was employed by them to lead writing workshops across the UK at places such as Derby Theatre, Chelthenham Everyman Theatre and Luton Hat Factory. In 2016, Mercy was commissioned by Tamasha and the Migration Museum Project to write a play for teens, which premiered in April 2016. Her work has been performed at several London venues such as the Almeida Theatre, the Bush Theatre, Theatre503, Soho Theatre and the St James Theatre.

== Other projects ==
In 2015, Mercy teamed up with the Lyric Hammersmith to offer four artists aged 16–25 an opportunity to develop their own work, on a project which she created called "Development Lab". She was also invited to speak and perform for the British Psychological Society at their "Minorities in Clinical Psychology" annual conference (using On The Edge of Me as a starting point).
