= Champion (British TV series) =

British musical drama television series

- Created by: Candice Carty-Williams
- Written by: Candice Carty-Williams; Ameir Brown; Isis Davis; Emma Dennis-Edwards; Edem Wornoo
- Directed by: John Ogunmuyiwa; Christiana Ebohon-Green; Caleb Femi; Adeyemi Michael
- Starring: Déja J Bowens; Malcolm Kamulete; Ray BLK
- Country of origin: United Kingdom
- Original language: English
- No. of series: 1
- No. of episodes: 8

Production
- Executive producers: Candice Carty-Williams; Bryan Elsley; Dave Evans; Danielle Scott-Haughton; Charlie Pattinson; Willow Grylls; Imogen O’Sullivan; Jo McClellan
- Producer: Joy Gharoro-Akpojotor
- Production companies: New Pictures; Balloon Entertainment

Original release
- Network: BBC One
- Release: 1 July – 19 August 2023

Champion is a British musical drama television series created and written by Candice Carty-Williams for BBC One which aired for one series from 1 July to 19 August 2023. It stars Déja J Bowens, Malcolm Kamulete, Ray BLK, Nadine Marshall, Ray Fearon, Jo Martin and Karl Collins. Set in South London, it focuses on the musical rivalry between two up-and-coming musicians, siblings Bosco and Vita Champion, and the ramifications and fallout of which could drive their family apart in their quest for musical stardom.

== Plot ==
The Champion siblings of South London, Bosco, and Vita, risk a musical rivalry that could drive their family apart.

Bosco has the fame but relies on his sister for support. Like a modern-day Cinderella, Vita sorts out his problems with stage-fright, writes his songs, and gets him out of the police station when he is arrested on his 25th birthday, but she gets no credit for any of it. Even her mother takes her for granted and favours her son over Vita. When Vita has the opportunity to record her own work she accepts, even though it will make her Bosco's main rival.

== Cast and characters ==
- Déja J Bowens as Vita Champion
- Malcolm Kamulete as Bosco Champion
- Ray BLK as Honey
- Nadine Marshall as Aria Champion
- Ray Fearon as Beres Champion
- Jo Martin as Dawn
- Kerim Hassan as Memet
- Adeyinka Akinrinade as Chantelle
- Tom Forbes as Mark
- Genesis Lynea as Tayo
- Karl Collins as Lennox
- Francis Lovehall as Laurent
- Corey Weekes as Bulla
- Rachel Adedeji as Yemi
- Keiren Hamilton-Amos as Rusty
- Olivia-Rose Colliard as Milan
- Grace Farrell as Amber
- Priscilla Fagbemi as Jade
- Fergus Rees as Philip
- Saskia Holness as Young Vita Champion

== Episodes ==
No.	Title	Directed by	Written by	Original release date
1	"Champion versus Champion"	John Ogunmuyiwa	Candice Carty-Williams	1 July 2023
As mentally unstable South London rapper Bosco Champion attempts a comeback upon his return from prison, his dutiful younger sister and songwriter Vita decides to pursue a solo music career, which causes friction between Bosco and her best friend Honey.
2	"The Clash"	John Ogunmuyiwa	Candice Carty-Williams	8 July 2023
Under the management of Mark, the fiancée of Bosco's ex girlfriend and baby mother, Chantelle, Vita’s attempts to record her first single but a public revelation during a freestyle battle between Bosco and rival Birmingham rapper Bulla worsens things with the family.
3	"Better Off on My Own"	John Ogunmuyiwa	Isis Davis	15 July 2023
As Vita’s fame rises and Bosco’s appears to fall, the siblings must decide what kind of people and artists they want to be – with potentially devastating consequences.
4	"It's Big Rusty"	Adeyemi Michael	Edem Wornoo	22 July 2023
During touring, Bosco’s mental health strains and breaks as he is reunited with an old friend. Meanwhile, Vita makes a decision she may later come to regret.
5	"I Love Her Man"	Adeyemi Michael	Emma Dennis-Edwards and Candice Carty-Williams	29 July 2023
Following the cancellation of his tour, Bosco's relationships with Beres and Memet strain. Vita's plans to make amends with her mother don't go to plan. Beres receives devastating news from Jamaica.
6	"Dat Is It"	Caleb Femi	Ameir Brown	5 August 2023
Aria and Vita are forced together for the funeral of Beres' father in Jamaica. However, a family rapprochement is ruined when long-buried secrets come to the surface.
7	"Moist Yute"	Christiana Ebohon-Green	Ameir Brown and Candice Carty-Williams	12 August 2023
Upon returning to London, Vita’s career goes from strength to strength but is faced with the decision to move away from her dysfuntional family, while Bosco begins to break upon learning that Beres is now controlling his career and Chantelle and Mark are taking his daughter Milan to New York City. Meanwhile, Aria tries to make amends with Lennox.
8	"Rise of the Phoenix"	Christiana Ebohon-Green	Candice Carty-Williams	19 August 2023
Six months on, Vita realises she can't leave her brother behind. On the verge of getting bankrupt, Beres teams up with Phil to bring back Bosco from hiding.

== Production ==
Candice Carty-Williams was revealed to be writing a London-based music drama for the BBC in May 2021. Carty-Williams is also executive producer on the project which is coming from the production companies New Pictures and Balloon Entertainment, and produced by Joy Gharoro-Akpojotor. Executive producers also include Bryan Elsley, Dave Evans and Danielle Scott-Haughton for Balloon Entertainment, Charlie Pattinson, Willow Grylls and Imogen O’Sullivan for New Pictures, and Jo McClellan for the BBC.

Writing credits on the series, with Carty-Williams, go to Ameir Brown, Isis Davis, Emma Dennis-Edwards and Edem Wornoo. Directing episodes are John Ogunmuyiwa, Adeyemi Michael, Christiana Ebohon-Green and Caleb Femi.

In March 2024, Carty-Williams confirmed the series would not be returning for a second series.

=== Music ===
Ray BLK is making her acting debut on the series and is music executive on the project, along with Ghetts. Candice-Williams wrote music for the series and had the music before the story and used it to help form the characters with their personalities matching their musical styles. A song from the series written by Ray BLK, My Girl, was released as a single on 30 June 2023.

=== Casting ===
In July 2022 the cast was announced to include Déja J Bowens, Malcolm Kamulete, Nadine Marshall, Ray Fearon, Jo Martin, Kerim Hassan, Adeyinka Akinrinade, Tom Forbes, Genesis Lynea, Karl Collins, Francis Lovehall, Corey Weekes, Rachel Adedeji and Ray BLK.

=== Filming ===
Filming took place in Birmingham in July, through to September 2022. Filming locations included Selly Oak Corker.

== Broadcast ==
The series premiered on BBC One in the UK and Ireland from 1 July 2023, and repeated the following Tuesday on BBC Three. In July 2022, Netflix bought the rights to the series outside the UK and Ireland.

== Reception ==
Hollie Richardson in The Guardian described it as having “sharp social observations” with “an impressive soundtrack”. Dan Einav in The Financial Times criticised the “verbose” script but said that a “scene in which Bosco trades rapid-fire bars of improvised insults with his arch-nemesis Bulla is as exhilarating as any action-movie fight sequence.” Anita Singh in The Daily Telegraph said “you’ll be rooting for Vita from the start, and Bowens is one to watch.” However, argued that the show would be better placed on the youth orientated BBC Three (which airs repeats of the series) rather than BBC One. Emily Baker for iNews compares “Vita’s radio-friendly melodies to Bosco’s grime performances and clashes against other MCs” saying that the result is “authentic, varied and – crucially – a really good soundtrack.”
