= E Squadron =

- Active: 1990s-2005 (as the 'Increment'); 2005-current (as E Squadron)
- Country: United Kingdom
- Type: Special Operations Military Unit
- Role: Unconventional Warfare; Covert Operations (including: Direct Action & Espionage)
- Size: Classified
- Part of: UK Special Forces (22nd SAS Regiment); Secret Intelligence Service
- Engagements: 2011 military intervention in Libya

E Squadron, formerly the Increment, is a British special forces unit that is formally part of the 22 Special Air Service Regiment tasked with conducting covert operations, paramilitary operations and others at the behest of the Director Special Forces and chief of the Secret Intelligence Service. Its members are selected from the United Kingdom Special Forces (UKSF), Defence Intelligence and are trained and tasked with carrying out operations in close contact with the Secret Intelligence Service (SIS), commonly known as MI6.

== History ==
From Richard Tomlinson's book The Big Breach, detailing the accounts of his experience as an SIS Intelligence Officer, the basic facts about the composition of the Increment and its relation to SIS are noted:

The army provides a detachment from the SAS regiment, called Revolutionary Warfare Wing in Credenhill, and the navy provides a small detachment from their Special Boat Service in Poole. Both have similar roles as far as MI6 is concerned and are known collectively within the service as the "Increment". To qualify for the Increment, SAS and SBS personnel must have served for at least five years and have reached the rank of sergeant. They are security vetted by MI6 and given a short induction course into the function and objectives of the service. If they have not already learnt surveillance skills, they take a three- week course at the Fort. Back at their bases in Hereford and Poole, their already substantial military skills are fine-tuned. They learn how to use improvised explosives and sabotage techniques, as well as advanced VIP protection skills, study guerilla warfare organisation and practise advanced insertion techniques - for example high-altitude parachuting from commercial aircraft or covert landings from submarines. Advanced civilian qualifications are acquired: several of the SBS Increment have commercial ship's skipper’s tickets in their alias name, enabling them legally to hire, say, a fishing trawler.

On the IONEC, a week of the course is dedicated to familiarisation with the Increment and the S&D flight and "military week" was eagerly anticipated by most of us.

IONEC is an acronym for the "Intelligence Officers New Entry Course", the programme in which Intelligence Officer recruits/trainees at SIS enroll. Some of the training, specifically the firearms training, takes place at Fort Monckton.

In June 2021, an Excel spreadsheet identifying over one thousand British soldiers recently promoted from corporal to sergeant was inadvertedly published which included the personal information of individuals in special operations forces and similar units. One operator from E Squadron was included in the spreadsheet, which was considered to be the first written evidence of the squadron's existence.

== Selection, training and operations ==
Increment members were drawn primarily from the Revolutionary Warfare Wing (RWW) of 22 SAS and from the equivalent wing of the SBS. They were deployed for assassinations, sabotage or dangerous/high-risk operations such as the arresting of war criminals in the Balkans.

E Squadron has been known to operate in conjunction with the U.S. Central Intelligence Agency's Special Activities Division.
