= Queenie (Carty-Williams novel) =

2019 new adult novel by Candice Carty-Williams

- First edition
- Author: Candice Carty-Williams
- Language: English
- Genre: New adult fiction
- Publisher: Orion
- Publication date: 19 March 2019
- Publication place: United Kingdom
- Media type: Print (hardcover and paperback), audiobook, e-book
- Pages: 330 (hardcover)
- ISBN: 9781501196010

Queenie is a new adult novel written by British author Candice Carty-Williams and published by Trapeze, an imprint of Orion, in 2019. The novel is about the life and loves of Queenie Jenkins, a vibrant, troubled 25-year-old British-Jamaican woman who is not having a very good year. In 2023, Channel 4 announced that Queenie had been made into a television drama, created and executive produced by Carty-Williams which aired in June 2024.

== Background ==
In 2017 Queenie was the subject of an auction between four publishers and was eventually acquired for a six-figure sum by Orion. Although it was marketed as "a black Bridget Jones", Carty-Williams herself said in an interview in Stylist magazine: "That's how I thought of her in the beginning, too. But this book is also naturally political just because of who Queenie is. She's not Bridget Jones. She could never be." Speaking on CBS Local, Carty-Williams further explained: "It's such a personal story, but it is one that is universal as well....It's not autobiographical, but it’s themes that I've borrowed from my life and my friends' lives."

== Reception ==
Queenie received much positive critical attention, described by reviewers as both a "smart and breezy comic debut" and "astutely political, an essential commentary on everyday racism"

According to Diana Evans, Queenie is an "important political tome of black womanhood and black British life, a rare perspective from the margins", and Afua Hirsch wrote in Time magazine: "Carty-Williams has taken a black woman’s story and made it a story of the age". On the paperback publication of Queenie in February 2020, Kate Saunders wrote in The Times: "This is a funny, clever, heartbreaking lightning bolt of a first novel, by a writer bristling with talent."

As of 2021, according to Nielsen BookScan UK, the novel has sold 153,439 copies; 34,936 copies in hardback and 115,317 copies in paperback. Queenie entered the Sunday Times Bestseller hardback chart at number two, went on to win the Blackwell's Debut Book of the Year 2019 award and was shortlisted as Book of the Year by Waterstones, Foyles and Goodreads, as well as being runner-up for the Costa First Novel Award. At the British Book Awards in June 2020 Queenie won the Book of the Year category, while Bernardine Evaristo was chosen as Author of the Year, making them the first black authors to win the top prizes. Carty-Williams commented that while she was proud to have won the accolade, "I'm also sad and confused that I'm the first black AND female author to have won this award since it began." She also stated: "Overall, this win makes me hopeful that although I'm the first, the industry are waking up to the fact that I shouldn't and won't be the last." Queenie was selected for the longlist for the Women's Prize for Fiction 2020. In September 2020 the novel was runner-up in the Comedy Women in Print Prize (CWIP).

Some writers have pointed out that the novel contains antisemitic tropes.

== Adaptation ==
A TV adaptation of Queenie was announced in 2019 as being in development for Channel 4, with Carty-Williams as the screenwriter. In August 2021, it was reported that the channel had commissioned an eight-episode drama series, with production starting in 2022. Dionne Brown will take the lead role, and the series will air in June 2024 in the UK.
