= Candice Carty-Williams =

British writer (born 1989)

- Born: 21 July 1989 (age 37); London, England
- Education: University of Sussex
- Occupations: Novelist, journalist, columnist
- Notable work: Queenie (2019)
- Awards: 2019 Blackwell's Debut Author of the Year; Book of the Year (Queenie)
- Website: candicecartywilliams.com

Candice Carty-Williams (born 21 July 1989) is a British writer, best known for her 2019 debut novel, Queenie. She has written for publications including The Guardian, i-D, Vogue, The Sunday Times, BEAT Magazine, and Black Ballad, and is a contributor to the anthology New Daughters of Africa (2019), edited by Margaret Busby.

At the British Book Awards in June 2020, Carty-Williams became the first black woman to win the "Book of the Year" accolade, for her novel Queenie.

== Biography ==
=== Early life and education ===
Candice Carty-Williams was born in St Thomas' Hospital, Westminster, and grew up in South London, living at various times in Croydon, Clapham, Streatham, Ladywell and Lewisham. Her mother is of Jamaican-Indian heritage and her Jamaican father had come to Britain at the age of 16 and worked as a cab driver. Carty-Williams has said of her parents: "Neither of them are readers, though my dad does have thousands of records, which is maybe where I get my love of collecting things (in this case, books) from. My grandparents were all born in Jamaica, as were my great-grandparents with the exception of my grandad, who was born in India."

She has said: "Growing up I never felt I could write... Writing is something I came to really late and I guess I’m still finding my confidence because I never thought it was an attainable career." She studied for a degree in communication and media studies at the University of Sussex, after which she decided to try to enter the publishing industry.

=== Publishing career ===
Internships with Melville House, 4th Estate and William Collins led to her being employed in 2014 as marketing assistant at the HarperCollins imprint 4th Estate, with promotion to marketing executive in 2015. While in this job she became aware of the underrepresentation of BAME authors and writers in publishing, so she created the Guardian and 4th Estate BAME Short Story Prize, which aimed to offer assistance towards publishing or literary agent representation. Tash Aw said the prize was "a small but hugely valuable step in supporting writers from minority backgrounds, and helping them gain the visibility that their work deserves".

In September 2016, she joined Vintage, where she was senior marketing executive and was also a mentor on the Penguin Books "Write Now" scheme, eventually leaving the imprint in May 2019.

In August 2026, she announced that she was withdrawing herself and the entire scheduled panel from an appearance that had been announced for October at the Cheltenham Literature Festival, where she had been a guest curator. This was in protest at festival co-sponsorship by The Times newspaper, which she wrongly believed had not commented on the death of Cambridge University professorJason Arday.

=== Queenie ===
In 2017, her first novel, Queenie, was the subject of an auction between four publishers and was eventually acquired for a six-figure sum by Orion. Published in 2019, the novel is about the "life and loves of Queenie Jenkins, a vibrant, troubled 25-year-old Jamaican Brit who is not having a very good year"', and although it was marketed as "a black Bridget Jones", Carty-Williams herself said in an interview in Stylist magazine: "That's how I thought of her in the beginning, too. But this book is also naturally political just because of who Queenie is. She's not Bridget Jones. She could never be." Speaking on CBS Local, Carty-Williams further explained: "It's such a personal story, but it is one that is universal as well....It's not autobiographical, but it's themes that I've borrowed from my life and my friends' lives." Queenie received much positive critical attention, described by reviewers as both a "smart and breezy comic debut" and "astutely political, an essential commentary on everyday racism."

In August 2021, it was announced that an eight-episode television drama series based on Queenie had been commissioned from Carty-Williams by Channel 4.

=== Other writing ===
Carty-Williams has written for publications including The Guardian, i-D, Vogue, The Sunday Times, Refinery29, BEAT Magazine, and Black Ballad. She contributed an essay to the anthology New Daughters of Africa (2019), edited by Margaret Busby, and has spoken of having first encountered the 1992 volume Daughters of Africa on the bookshelf of her godmother, academic Heidi Safia Mirza (Professor of Race at Goldsmiths, University of London).

It was announced on 7 January 2020 that Carty-Williams had been appointed the new weekly books columnist of The Guardian, with her first piece for the newspaper in this role appearing on 11 January and her columns continuing throughout 2020. She announced in her column of 2 January 2021 that it would be her last, explaining: "I remember when I first met my editors to discuss this column; we were all so excited about what 2020 would bring and what I'd write about. Then, as we all know, the year went … sideways and this column effectively became dispatches from lockdown. ... I have loved every word I've written; but with my second novel, People Person, coming out in 2021, I'll be chained to my desk (my bed/my sofa/the chair in my room I sit on when I need to think about things) with very little time to keep an eye on what's happening in the literary world."

She is a contributor to Dear NHS, edited by Adam Kay, a 2020 anthology of personal stories from famous people about how they have been helped by the National Health Service.

Carty-Williams wrote a short story for Prada's holiday 2020 campaign, photographed by Steven Meisel.

On 16 March 2020, Knights Of announced that they would be publishing a young adult novella written by Carty-Williams, titled Empress & Aniya, which follows two teenage girls from different backgrounds, who accidentally cast a body swap spell on their 16th birthday. which was released on 7 October 2021.

In May 2021, Williams was announced as having been commissioned by the BBC to write Champion, a London-based musical television drama.

People Person, Carty-Williams' second novel, was published in April 2022.

In 2025, a sequel to her debut novel Queenie was announced for publication in 2026 under the title Queenie Is Working On It.

== Bibliography ==
=== Novels ===
- —— (2019). Queenie. Trapeze. ISBN 9781409180050.
- —— (2022). People Person. Trapeze. ISBN 9781409180104.
- —— (2026). Queenie is Working on It. Trapeze. ISBN 9781409198970.

=== Novellas ===
The following a young adult novella published by Knights Of

- —— (2021). Empress & Aniya. Knights of Media. ISBN 9781913311100.
