= Danielle Vitalis =

English actress

Danielle Vitalis is a British actress and writer. She has lead roles in series such as Sliced (2019) and Smothered (2023), and made appearances in films like Attack the Block (2011) and The Great Escaper (2023).

== Early life ==
Vitalis lived part of her childhood in Saint Lucia before moving to the London borough of Hackney in the 1990s. Her mother’s family are St. Lucian.

== Career ==
Vitalis made her screen debut in the 2011 Joe Cornish film Attack the Block, playing Tia. She later appeared in the E4 comedy drama series Youngers, the BBC Three supernatural series In the Flesh and the Dave sitcom Sliced with Samson Kayo. In 2020, she was included as one of Digital Spy magazine’s 30 Black British stars of tomorrow.

After appearances in Horrible Histories and Stath Lets Flats, in 2020 she joined the third series of Famalam, with Kayo and Vivienne Acheampong. Her acting credits also include I May Destroy You and the Black Mirror episode "Joan Is Awful".

In 2023, she was in The Great Escaper with Michael Caine and Glenda Jackson. In The Guardian, Peter Bradshaw mentioned her performance as one of the best in a supporting role on film in 2023. That year she also played the lead role of Sammy in the Monica Heisey written Sky Comedy series Smothered alongside Jon Pointing and Aisling Bea.

== Filmography ==
Key
†	Denotes works that have not yet been released

Year	Title	Role	Notes
2011	Attack the Block	Tia	
2013–2014	Youngers	Louise	11 episodes
2013–2014	In the Flesh	Hannah	
2017	Timewasters	Myrtle	
2019	Sliced	Tika	3 episodes
2019	Horrible Histories	Ensemble actor	1 episode
2019	This Way Up	Poppy	1 episode
2019	Stath Lets Flats	Neema	1 episode
2020	I May Destroy You	Teen Arabella	3 episodes
2020	Famalam	Various	5 episodes, also writer
2021	Death in Paradise	Aneesha Cole	1 episode
2022	Murder, They Hope	Emma	1 episode
2023; 2025	Black Mirror	Fatima Klaas; Mika	"Joan Is Awful" "Hotel Reverie"
2023	The Great Escaper	Adele	
2023	Smothered	Sammy	Lead role
