= Lost in London =

2017 film by Woody Harrelson

- Directed by: Woody Harrelson
- Written by: Woody Harrelson
- Produced by: Woody Harrelson; Ken Kao
- Starring: Woody Harrelson; Owen Wilson; Willie Nelson
- Cinematography: Nigel Willoughby
- Release date: 19 January 2017 (London)
- Running time: 100 minutes
- Country: United States

Lost in London (also known as Lost in London LIVE) is a 2017 American independent biographical comedy-drama film written, starring, and directed by Woody Harrelson in his directorial debut. The film also stars Owen Wilson and Willie Nelson. The film was shot and screened live in select theatres on 19 January 2017. It is the first time a film was live broadcast into theatres.

== Cast ==
- Woody Harrelson as himself
- Eleanor Matsuura as Laura Louie, Woody's wife
- Owen Wilson as himself
- Zrinka Cvitešić as Suen
- Willie Nelson as himself
- Louisa Harland as Stella
- Martin McCann as Paddy
- Sean Power as Dave
- Amir El-Masry as Omar
- David Mumeni as Alan
- David Avery as Sayed
- Nathan Willcocks as Eugene
- Bono as himself (voice)
- Ali Hewson as herself (voice)
- Daniel Radcliffe as himself

== Development ==
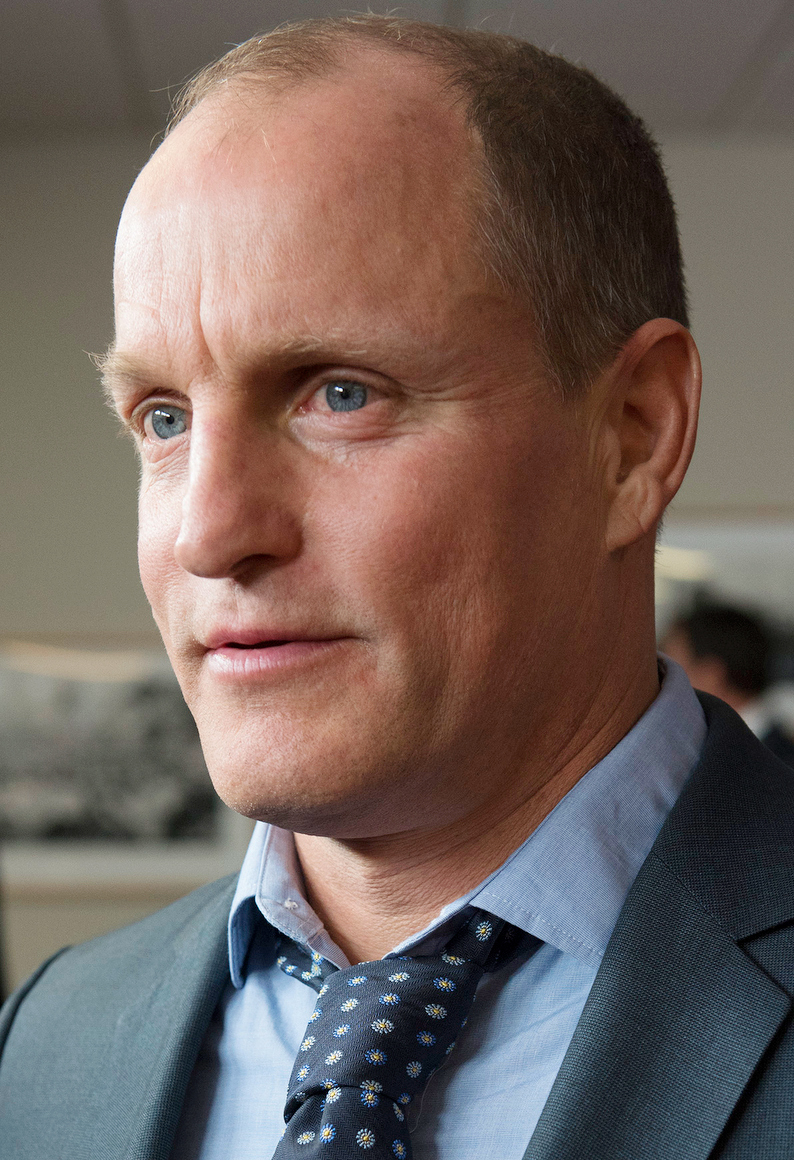
Woody Harrelson in 2016

The idea for the film came to Harrelson following a night out at Chinawhite, a club in Soho, in 2002. He broke an ashtray in a London taxi, which led to his being chased by police in a different taxi, and spending a night in jail. In the film, Harrelson, Wilson and Nelson play themselves in a story based on the real event, where Harrelson struggles to get home, while running into friends and members of a royal family.

Harrelson announced the film in September 2016. According to Harrelson, the film contains 30 cast members and 14 shooting locations. The film also includes car and foot chase scenes. It is the first film that Harrelson has directed. The film was produced by Harrelson and Ken Kao of Waypoint Entertainment, while Fathom Events assisted in the live production. Nigel Willoughby is the cinematographer. The film was shot on 20 January, and it was broadcast in over 550 theatres in the United States starting 1800 PST on 19 January. The film was shot in a single take with one camera. The running time is approximately 100 minutes. After the live showing, Harrelson participated in a question and answer session. In addition to Harrelson, Wilson and Nelson, Zrinka Cvitešić was also cast. The film officially premiered in London on 27 January 2017.

== Reception ==
On review aggregator website Rotten Tomatoes, the film holds an approval rating of 75% based on 8 reviews, and an average rating of 6.3/10.

Writing for the London Evening Standard, Nick Curtis judged Harrelson's film, "A daft idea, the kind of mad, experimental challenge dreamed up by stoned film nerds after a Hitchcock all-nighter, but one he pulled off with considerable wit and brio. Lost In London is not a great film. How could it be when character and plot are slaves to the concept, when all we have is the frame of a single camera? But it is a brilliant technical and logistical achievement, especially from a first-time director previously known for comedy and character roles, and a hippyish devotion to marijuana. Laced with self-mockery, it's very funny, and far better than we had any right to expect."

In The Daily Telegraph, Tim Robey found, "It went alright on the night, with no hideous glitches", adding that, "Breaking new ground with this live experiment was only a matter of time, and single-take gambits of its ilk have been dabbled in for years. Had the technology allowed him back in 2000, Mike Figgis would surely have shown his brilliant, split-screen Timecode this way. Harrelson acknowledges his debt to the mesmeric German thriller Victoria, with its similar sense of urban emergency." Robey praised Harrelson and Owen Wilson's trading of insults, before concluding, "[…] the film lurches to a halt more with relief that it's crossed the finish line than with anything you'd call an elegant climax. Who knows what it'll look like down the line as a record of its own premiere—the live-streaming may well have been its oxygen. But we did watch the boundaries crumble outright between live performance and real, on-the-hoof film-making, to amply entertaining effect."

Ryan Gilbey, reviewing the film for The Guardian, noted that, "Actors who try their hand as a director typically start off with something small-scale—a sensitive coming-of-age story, say, such as Jodie Foster's Little Man Tate or Robert De Niro's A Bronx Tale. With Lost in London, Harrelson went as far in the opposite direction as one can imagine. This was edge-of-the-seat, seat-of-the-pants film-making. He didn't just jump in at the deep end: he did so into shark-filled waters." Overall, Gilbey wrote, "Bumps and wrinkles in the film would doubtless have been remedied with the luxury of reshoots. […] Nothing, though, will quite match the sensation of having watched the messy but miraculous birth of a genuine oddity: part celebrity satire, part mea culpa, part site-specific, one-night-only art installation."

Lost in London was favourably reviewed on BBC Radio 4's Front Row on 20 January 2017 by Jason Solomons, who previewed it the evening before.
