= Prime Resident =

Prime Resident is a play by Stella Duffy, first performed in 2006 as part of the National Youth Theatre of Great Britain's Summer Sextet, marking the company's 50th anniversary. The sextet cycled though each of the decades the NYT has been in Britain's theatre, culminating with Prime Resident, set in 2009.

Prime Resident was performed at the Soho Theatre and Writers Centre (West End) in repertoire from 4 August to 2 September 2006.

Written by Stella Duffy (Improbable, Spontaneous Combustion, Immaculate Conceit), Prime Resident offers a cynical view of a future Britain under the 'dictatorship' of a Prime Resident (played by Tom Williams) and his political allies, the Shadow Monistor and Home Secretary (Ben Fowler and Chloe Casselton), who are hell bent on returning citizens to their country of birth. Intertwined is the story of two lovers (Abidemi Oyediran and David Mumeni), the Three Conspiracy Theorists always on the lookout for the next plan (Sair Khan, Grant Black, and Christian Wassell), and the religious fundamentalists (Rosie Reynolds and Lauren Cooney). Throughout, the Grief Eaters (Kane Husbands, Philippa Hambly, and Petrina Sargent) provide comic interventions. The show reaches a dramatic climax when The Host (Stephen Johnston) leads "Repatriation! Repatriation!" and the lovers look as though they may be parted forever.

The show was described as an ensemble masterpiece by the Evening Standard, who said, "Director Juliet Knight drills her cast of 14 beautifully." The lighting design by David W. Kidd was also praised.

== Credits ==
- Director: Juliet Knight (assisted by Martin Stirling)
- Writer: Stella Duffy
- Cast: Grant Black, Chloe Castleton, Lauren Cooney, Ben Fowler, Philippa Hambly, Kane Husbands, Stephen Johnston, Sair Khan, David Mumeni, Abidemi Oyediran, Rosie Reynolds, Petrina Sargent, Christian Wassell, Tom Williams
- Designer: Mike Ozouf
- Costume design: Lotte Collett
- Lighting design: David W Kidd
- Sound design: Roberto Raskovsky
- Stage management: Nick Hill, Sam Orme, and Kirsty Robinson
