= Stella Duffy =

London-born writer and theatremaker

Stella Duffy OBE
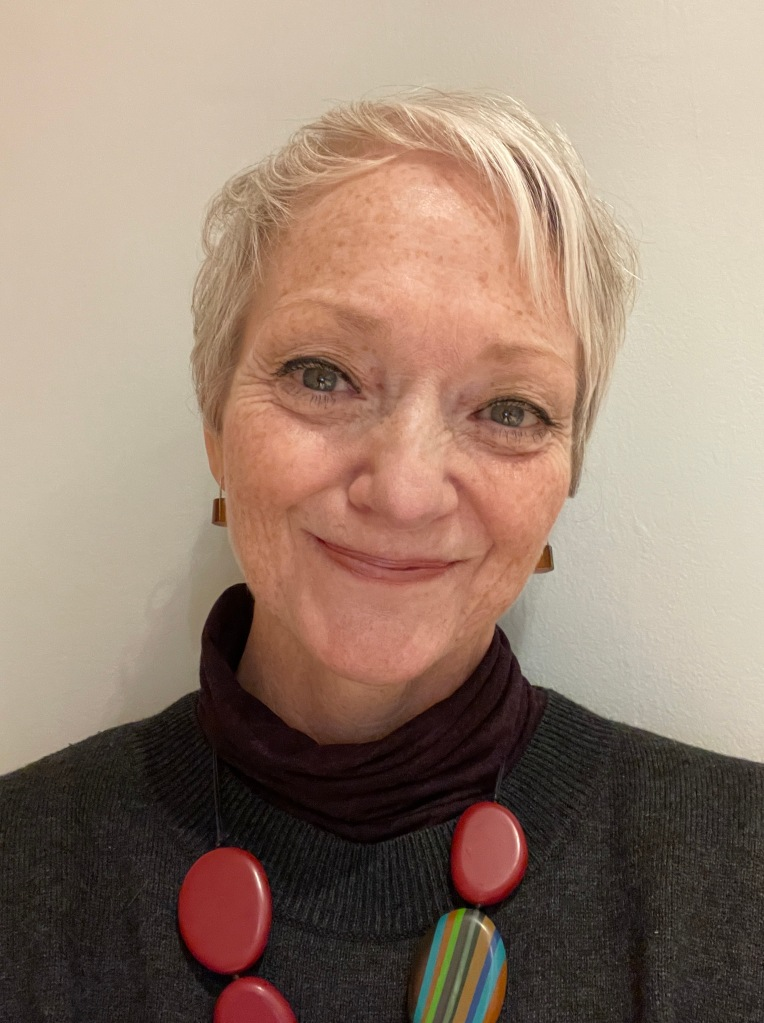
- Duffy in 2022
- Born: Stella Frances Duffy; Woolwich, London, UK
- Occupations: Novelist, performer
- Website: stelladuffy.blog

Stella Frances Silas Duffy OBE (born 1963) is a London-born writer and theatremaker. Born in London, she spent her childhood in New Zealand before returning to the UK.

== Early life and education ==
Born in London in 1963 to a New Zealand father and an English mother, Duffy is the youngest in a family of seven children. She spent her early childhood on a council estate in Woolwich. The family moved to Tokoroa, New Zealand when Duffy was five, and Duffy later returned to London. She studied English literature and drama at Victoria University of Wellington.

== Career ==
Duffy has written several literary novels, as well as crime novels in the Saz Martin series, published by Serpent's Tail.

In 2018 HarperCollins Publishers released Money in the Morgue by Ngaio Marsh and Stella Duffy. The book was started by Marsh during World War II, but abandoned. Working with just the book's title, first three chapters and some notes—but no idea of the plot or motive of the villain—Duffy completed the novel, which has received widespread praise for its authenticity and seamless transition between the two authors' work.

She has also written over sixty short stories, many plays, as well as feature articles and reviews. With Lauren Henderson she co-edited the fiction anthology Tart Noir (2002). Her own short story in that collection, Martha Grace, was awarded the 2002 Crime Writers' Association's Macallan Short Story Dagger. Singling out the Couples was shortlisted for the 1999 James Tiptree Jr Memorial Award. State of Happiness was longlisted for the 2004 Orange Prize, as was The Room of Lost Things in 2008.

She adapted the film script of State of Happiness for Fiesta Productions. The first novel in her Saz Martin series, Calendar Girl, was voted fifth equal in the 2007 international poll "The Big Gay Read".

Duffy has written many plays, including The Book of Ruth (and Naomi) for the Bush Theatre's inaugural Sixty Six Books set of plays, an adaptation of Medea, Prime Resident, Immaculate Conceit, The Hand, and solo shows Breaststrokes and The Tedious Predictability of Falling in Love.

As a stage performer, she is an associate artist with Improbable, has been a member of the comedy improvisation company Spontaneous Combustion since 1988 and has guested with The Comedy Store Players. She has performed her solo show Breaststrokes (Time Out and The Guardian Critic's Choice) in London, Belfast, Cardiff, Dublin, York, and Amsterdam.

She directed Murder, Marple and Me for the Gilded Balloon (Edinburgh 2012 and tour 2013), Cell Sell for the National Youth Theatre at the Soho Theatre; Kikia te Poa (Matthew J. Saville), Precious Things (company devised) at the Pacific Playhouse, Skin Tight (Gary Henderson (playwright)) at the Pleasance Islington and Riverside Studios, My Inner Orc at the Pleasance, TaniwhaThames at OvalHouse Theatre. Ordinary Darkness at Hen and Chickens – all for Shaky Isles; and The Seduction of Ms Sarah Hart (Caron Pascoe) at The Oval for Kindred Spirits.

On screen, she appeared in a 1997 episode of ITV police procedural series The Bill the 2001 movie Absolution.

She also wrote and presented a documentary in 2008 for the BBC's Time Shift strand called How to Write a Mills and Boon.

Duffy was appointed Officer of the Order of the British Empire (OBE) in the 2016 Birthday Honours for services to the arts.

== Other activities ==
On 18 April 2015, Duffy spoke at one of the early meetings of a new political party, the Women's Equality Party.

Duffy is the founder and co-director of the Fun Palaces campaign.

== Personal life ==
Duffy is a practising Buddhist and as of 2010 lived in Lambeth with her wife, playwright Shelley Silas.

== Novels ==
- Calendar Girl (1994)
- Wavewalker (1996)
- Beneath the Blonde (1997)
- Singling Out the Couples (1998)
- Eating Cake (1999)
- Fresh Flesh (1999)
- Immaculate Conceit (2000)
- State of Happiness (2004)
- Parallel Lies (2005)
- Mouths of Babes (2005)
- The Room of Lost Things (2008)
- Theodora, Actress, Empress, Whore (2010)
- The Purple Shroud (2012)
- London Lies Beneath (2016)
- The Hidden Room (2017)
- Money in the Morgue (2018) with Ngaio Marsh
- Lullaby Beach (2021)

== Stage plays ==
- The Tedious Predictability of Falling in Love (1990)
- The Hand, A Lesbian Horror Ballet (1995)
- Close To You (1996)
- Crocodiles and Bears (1999)
- Immaculate Conceit (2003)
- Breaststrokes (2004)
- Prime Resident (2006)
- Medea (new version for Steam Industry) 2009

== Awards ==
- CWA Short Story Dagger Award 2002 for Martha Grace (Tart Noir)
- CWA Short Story Dagger Award 2013 for Come Away With Me (Mammoth Book of Best British Mysteries)
- Stonewall Writer of the Year 2008 for The Room of Lost Things
- Stonewall Writer of the Year 2010 for Theodora, Actress, Empress, Whore
