= David Mumeni =

British actor

- Born: David Mahamed Mumeni; 1986/1987; Hammersmith, London, England
- Education: Drama Centre London
- Years active: 2006–present

David Mahamed Mumeni (born 1986/1987) is an English actor. On television, he is known for his roles in the E4 sitcom Dead Pixels (2019–2021) and the Dave sitcom Sliced (both 2019–2021). He is also known for founding the non-profit drama school initiative Open Door.

== Early life ==
Mumeni was born in Hammersmith, West London, the son of a mechanic. He is half Iranian. As a teenager, Mumeni joined the Artists Theatre School founded by Amanda Redman, who helped him get into the Drama Centre London.

== Career ==
Mumeni made his television debut in a 2010 episode of the ITV police procedural Whitechapel. He had his first named film role in Noble in 2014. He had stage roles in Mush & Me at the 2014 Edinburgh Fringe Festival, True Brits at the 2015 VAULT Festival, Lela & Co at the Royal Court Theatre and Pine at the Hampstead Theatre.

Mumeni appeared in the ITV series Fearless as Hamid and the films Lost in London in 2017 and Johnny English Strikes Again in 2018.

From 2019 to 2021, Mumeni starred in the E4 gamer comedy Dead Pixels as Russell and the Dave sitcom Sliced as Mario. He also appeared in an installment of the Channel 4 anthology I Am... and had a recurring role as Cem in the sitcom Stath Lets Flats.

Mumeni played Steve McGee in the 2022 ITV One miniseries No Return. He also appeared in the Netflix miniseries The Pentaverate, the Sky Comedy series Bloods and the BBC iPlayer series Ladhood. The following year, Mumeni had a supporting role as Footrub Ken in the film Barbie and joined the cast of the ITV biographical series Changing Ends as Mr Chapman.

In 2024, Mumeni starred as Jimmy in the Channel 5 miniseries Coma. He appeared in the third season of the Netflix period drama Bridgerton as Lord Samadani, a suitor to Francesca Bridgerton, and the Amazon Prime series Big Mood as Kaz.

== Philanthropy ==
With help from patrons including Emilia Clarke, Riz Ahmed and David Morrissey, Mumeni founded Open Door, a non-profit initiative to help young aspiring actors from working class backgrounds access drama school auditions and opportunities. It was first piloted in 2017. In summer 2023, Open Door expanded its programmes to the north of England.

== Filmography ==
=== Film ===
Year	Title	Role	Notes
2011	The Inbetweeners Movie	Hotel Staff Member	
2014	Noble	Mario	
2016	The Huntsman: Winter's War	Lead Soldier	
2017	Lost in London	Alan	
2018	Risk	Clark	Short film
2018	Mission: Impossible – Fallout	Marine Sergeant	
2018	Fubar	Toby	
2018	Johnny English Strikes Again	Fabien	
2019	Hobbs & Shaw	Computer Tech	
2019	Last Christmas	Guy in Pub	
2020	Hunch	Tal	Short film
2022	On Your Behalf	Button	Short film
2023	Barbie	Footrub Ken	
2024	Portraits of Dangerous Women	Steve	

=== Television ===
Year	Title	Role	Notes
2010	Whitechapel	Wayland	1 episode
2011	Fresh Meat	Mark	1 episode
2011	Doctors	Pete Standish	Episode: "Boyz in da Wood"
2012	Confessions from the Underground		Documentary
2012	Cuckoo	Toby	Episode: "Family Meeting"
2013	PhoneShop	Eduardo	Episode: "Hair Today"
2015	Finding Jesus	Judas	Docuseries
2015	The Last Hours of Laura K	Ekin Suvari	Television film
2016	Comedy Playhouse	Doctor	Episode: "Hospital People"
2016	The Windsors	Farouk	2 episodes
2016	Love, Nina	Dr Adam Moore	1 episode
2016	Avatards	AJ	Comedy blap
2016	Damned	Frank	1 episode
2016	Drifters	Jeff	Episode: "Big Break"
2017	Fearless	Hamid	3 episodes
2018	Death on the Tyne	Bobby	Television film
2019–2021	Dead Pixels	Russell	11 episodes
2019–2021	Sliced	Mario	8 episodes
2019	I Am...	Will	Episode: "I Am Hannah"
2019–2021	Stath Lets Flats	Cem	5 episodes
2019	Dial M for Middlesbrough	Radio DJ	Television film
2021	Please Help	Dr Nichols	1 episode
2021	The Girl Before	Mark	1 episode
2022	No Return	Steve McGee	Miniseries
2022	The Pentaverate	Anso	4 episodes
2022	Ellie & Natasia	Stockholm Anne	1 episode
2022	Bloods	Roger	3 episodes
2022	Ladhood	Toby	2 episodes
2023–2025	Changing Ends	Mr Chapman	6 episodes
2023	The Power of Parker	Mr Scott	Episode: "Miss Stockport"
2024	Coma	Jimmy	Miniseries
2024	Big Mood	Kaz	2 episodes
2024	Bridgerton	Lord Samadani	2 episodes
2025	Death in Paradise	Steve Montagu	1 episode
2025	Mr Bigstuff	El-Baz	2 episodes
2025	Mammoth	Mr Reynolds	1 episode

=== Video games ===
Year	Title	Role	Notes
2019	Blood & Truth		
2023	Final Fantasy XVI	Theodore	English version
2025	Battlefield 6	Idris Oman	

== Stage ==
Year	Title	Role	Notes
2006	Prime Resident		
2012	'Tis Pity She's a Whore	Grimaldi	Cheek by Jowl / Barbican Theatre, London
2013	The Machine	Rajit	Donmar Warehouse, London
2014	Mush & Me	Mush	Edinburgh Fringe Festival
2015	True Brits	Rahul	VAULT Festival
2015	Lela & Co	A Man	Royal Court Theatre, London
2015	Pine	Taj	Hampstead Theatre, London
2019	A History of Water in the Middle East	M16 Agent	Royal Court Theatre, London
