= Smothered (TV series) =

British Television series

- Genre: Romantic comedy
- Created by: Monica Heisey
- Written by: Monica Heisey
- Directed by: George Belfield
- Starring: Danielle Vitalis; Jon Pointing; Aisling Bea; Blair Underwood
- Country of origin: United Kingdom
- Original language: English
- No. of seasons: 1
- No. of episodes: 6

Production
- Producer: Lauriel Martin
- Production company: Roughcut

Original release
- Network: Sky Comedy
- Release: 7 December – 21 December 2023

Smothered is a British romantic comedy television series, created by Monica Heisey and starring Danielle Vitalis, Jon Pointing, Aisling Bea, and Blair Underwood. It premiered on 7 December 2023 on Sky Comedy.

== Synopsis ==
Sammy (Vitalis) and Tom (Pointing) meet on a night out at karaoke and start a no-strings-attached affair for a limited time on the condition that they will never speak to each other again after three weeks.

== Cast and characters ==
=== Main ===
- Danielle Vitalis as Sammy
- Jon Pointing as Tom
- Aisling Bea as Gillian, a restaurateur
- Blair Underwood as David

=== Supporting ===
- Isabelle Lee Pratt as Ellie, Tom's daughter
- Tessa Wong as Mims, Tom's colleague
- Harry Trevaldwyn as Jordan, Tom's colleague
- Lisa Hammond as Raina, Sammy's colleague
- Rebecca Lucy Taylor as Farrah, Sammy's flatmate
- Amber Grappy as AJ, Sammy's flatmate
- Sarel Madziya as Olivia
- Jordan Stephens as Max, Sammy's ex

== Episodes ==
No. in series	Title	Directed by	Written by	Original release date
1	"Episode 1"	George Belfield	Monica Heisey	7 December 2023
2	"Episode 2"	George Belfield	Monica Heisey	7 December 2023
3	"Episode 3"	George Belfield	Monica Heisey; Anna Ssemuyaba	14 December 2023
4	"Episode 4"	George Belfield	Monica Heisey	14 December 2023
5	"Episode 5"	George Belfield	Monica Heisey	21 December 2023
6	"Episode 6"	George Belfield	Monica Heisey; Yemi Oyefuwa	21 December 2023

== Production ==
Following a non-transmission pilot shot in London in September and October 2022 and directed by Luke Snellin, the project was announced as a Sky Comedy original series in October 2022, to be written by Monica Heisey and produced by Lauriel Martin for Roughcut based in part on the step-parenting experiences of Roughcut producer Emma Lawson. In January 2023, it was announced that the six-part series was shooting predominantly in London with the comedy directing debut of George Belfield, with Jon Pointing and Danielle Vitalis confirmed in the cast in the lead roles, and a role in the cast for Aisling Bea.

== Broadcast ==
The series premiered on 7 December 2023 on Sky Comedy and Now.
