= Coma (2024 TV series) =

British television series

- Genre: Drama
- Created by: Ben Edwards
- Written by: Ben Edwards; Alex Smith
- Directed by: Michael Samuels
- Starring: Jason Watkins; Jonas Armstrong; Claire Skinner; David Bradley; Joe Barber; Kayla Meikle; David Mumeni
- Country of origin: United Kingdom
- Original language: English
- No. of series: 1
- No. of episodes: 4

Production
- Executive producers: Ash Atalla; Alex Smith; Marianna Abbotts
- Production companies: Roughcut Television; CBS Studios

Original release
- Network: Channel 5
- Release: 18 March – 21 March 2024

Coma is a 2024 British television drama series. Starring Jason Watkins and Jonas Armstrong, it aired on Channel 5 in March 2024.

== Synopsis ==
A family man has an out-of-character confrontation with a gang of local youths and must face the consequences of his actions.

== Cast ==
- Jason Watkins as Simon Henderson
- Jonas Armstrong as Paul Franklin
- Claire Skinner as Beth Henderson
- Joe Barber as Jordan Franklin
- David Bradley as Harry White
- Kayla Meikle as DS Kelly Evans
- David Mumeni as Jimmy
- Matilda Firth as Sophie Henderson
- Adrienn Retinas as Anna Franklin
- Craige Els as Mark
- Kwadwo Kwateng as Mason

== Production ==
The series was commissioned in October 2023 by Channel 5. It is produced by Roughcut Television and CBS Studios. Written and created by Ben Edwards, the executive producers for Roughcut Television are Alex Smith, Marianna Abbotts and Ash Atalla. The director is Michael Samuels.

The series was filmed in the Hungarian city Budapest. The cast is led by Jason Watkins and Claire Skinner, best known for their roles as DS Dodds and CS Mary Ormond respectively in the ITV crime drama, McDonald & Dodds, playing a married couple.

== Broadcast ==
The four-part series was broadcast on consecutive nights on Channel 5 from 18 March 2024. According to BARB 7-day data, the series averaged 3.2 million viewers across its four episodes.

== Reception ==
Lucy Mangan in The Guardian gave the series four stars and described it as "excruciatingly tense in its authenticity". Anita Singh in The Daily Telegraph praised the casting, saying that Watkins was "entirely believable as a mild-mannered everyman pushed to his limits.” Carol Midgley in The Times described it as "intensely addictive".
