= Piccadilly Circus =

Road junction and public place in London, England

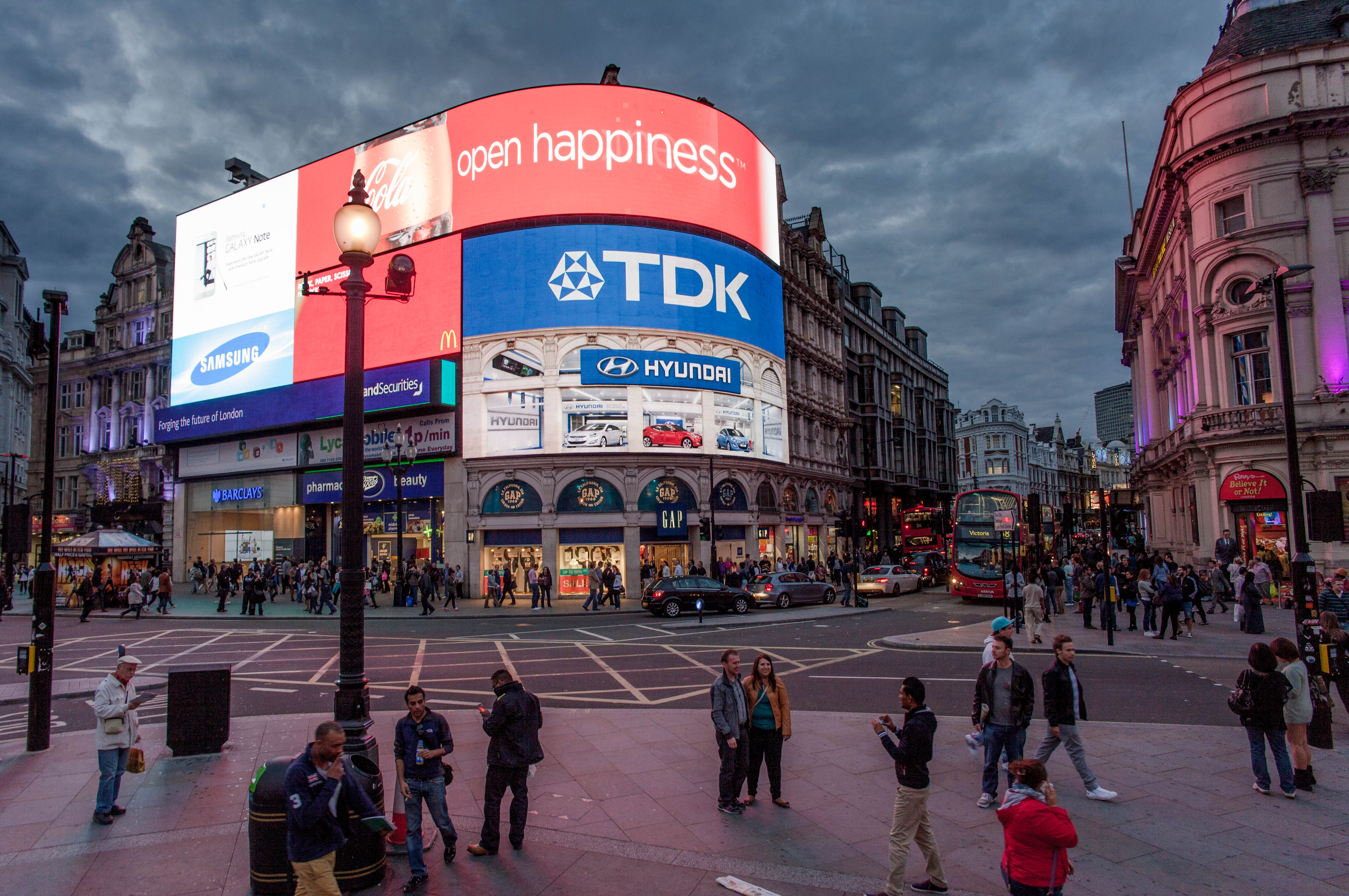
- Piccadilly Circus in 2012
- Interactive map of Piccadilly Circus

Location
- London, United Kingdom
- Coordinates: 51°30′36″N 0°8′4″W
- Roads at junction: Regent Street, Piccadilly, Shaftesbury Avenue, The Haymarket, Coventry Street and Glasshouse Street

Construction
- Type: Road junction
- Opened: 1819

Piccadilly Circus is a road junction and public space of London's West End in the City of Westminster. It was built in 1819 to connect Regent Street with Piccadilly. In this context, a circus, from the Latin word meaning "circle", is a round open space at a street junction.

The Circus now connects Piccadilly, Regent Street, Shaftesbury Avenue, the Haymarket, Coventry Street (onwards to Leicester Square) and Glasshouse Street. It is close to major shopping and entertainment areas in the West End. Its status as a major traffic junction has made Piccadilly Circus a busy meeting place and a tourist attraction in its own right. The Circus is particularly known for its video display and neon signs mounted on the corner building on the northern side, as well as the Shaftesbury Memorial Fountain and statue of Anteros (which is popularly, though mistakenly, believed to be of Eros).

It is surrounded by several notable buildings, including the London Pavilion and Criterion Theatre. Underneath the plaza is Piccadilly Circus tube station, part of the London Underground system.

== History ==
Piccadilly Circus connects to Piccadilly, a thoroughfare whose name first appeared in 1626 as Piccadilly Hall, named after a house belonging to one Robert Baker, a tailor famous for selling piccadills, or piccadillies, a term used for various kinds of collars. The street was known as Portugal Street in 1692 in honour of Catherine of Braganza, the queen consort of King Charles II but was known as Piccadilly by 1743. Piccadilly Circus was created in 1819, at the junction with Regent Street, which was then being built under the planning of John Nash on the site of a house and garden belonging to a Lady Hutton; the intersection was then known as Regent Circus South (just as Oxford Circus was known as Regent Circus North) and it did not begin to be known as Piccadilly Circus until the mid-1880s, with the rebuilding of the Regent Street Quadrant and the construction of Shaftesbury Avenue. In the same period the circus lost its circular form.

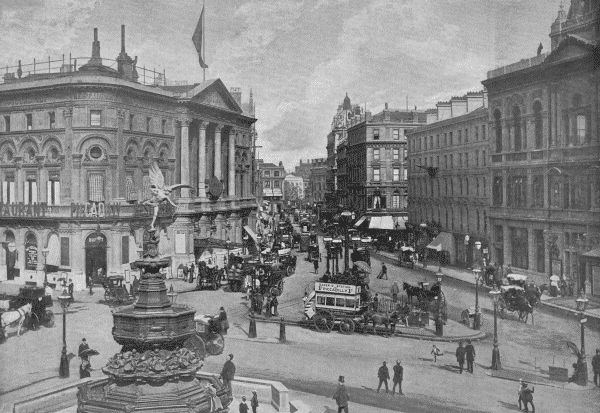
Piccadilly Circus in 1896, with a view towards Leicester Square via Coventry Street. London Pavilion is on the left, and Criterion Theatre on the right.

The junction has been a very busy traffic interchange since construction, as it lies at the centre of Theatreland and handles exit traffic from Piccadilly, which Charles Dickens Jr. described in 1879: "Piccadilly, the great thoroughfare leading from the Haymarket and Regent-street westward to Hyde Park-corner, is the nearest approach to the Parisian boulevard of which London can boast."

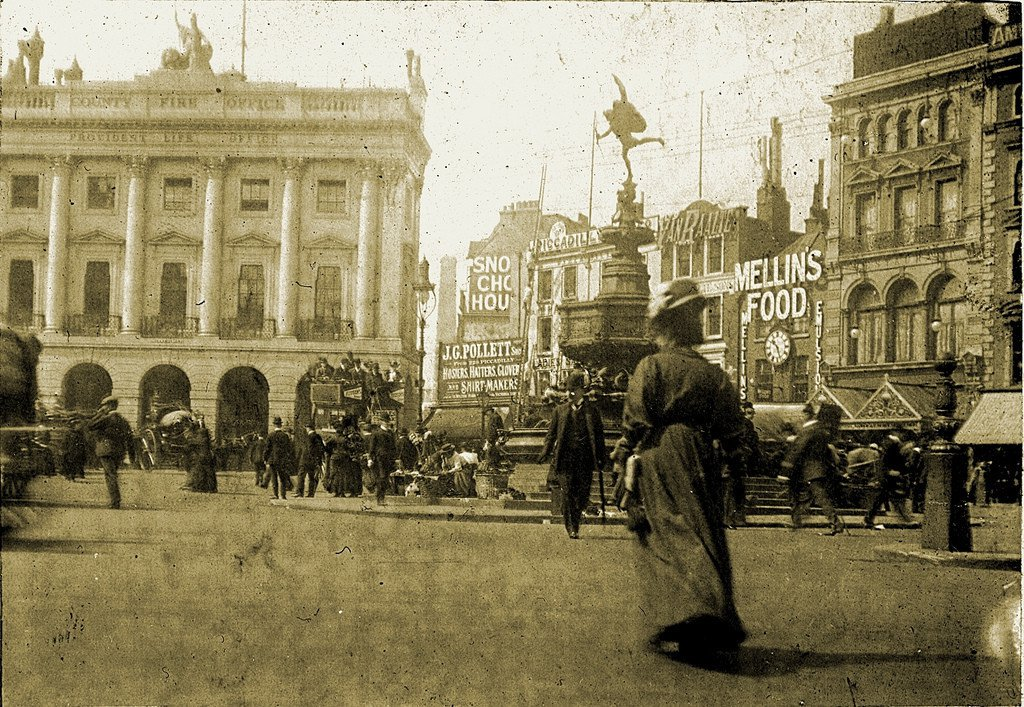
Piccadilly Circus with electric advertisements in 1908. On the left is the old County Fire Office.

Piccadilly Circus tube station was opened on 10 March 1906, on the Bakerloo line, and on the Piccadilly line in December of that year. In 1928, the station was extensively rebuilt to handle an increase in traffic. The junction's first electric advertisements appeared in 1908, and, from 1923, electric billboards were set up on the facade of the London Pavilion. Electric street lamps, however, did not replace the gas ones until 1932. The circus became a one-way roundabout on 19 July 1926. Traffic lights were first installed on 3 August 1926.

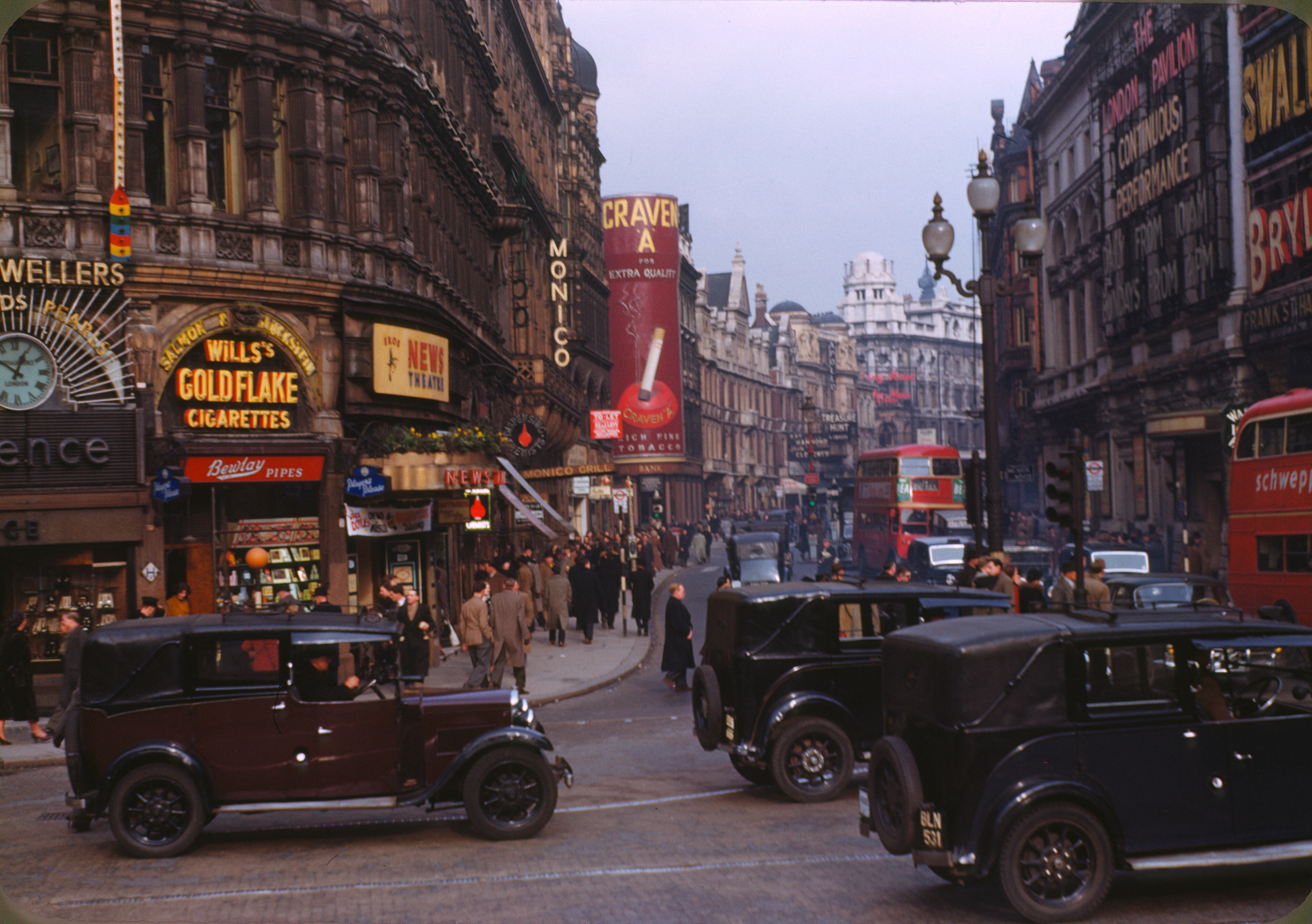
Piccadilly Circus in 1949

During World War II many servicemen's clubs in the West End served American soldiers based in Britain, including Rainbow Corner established by the American Red Cross just off Piccadilly Circus. So many prostitutes roamed the area approaching the soldiers that they received the nickname "Piccadilly Commandos", and both Scotland Yard and the Foreign Office discussed possible damage to Anglo-American relations.

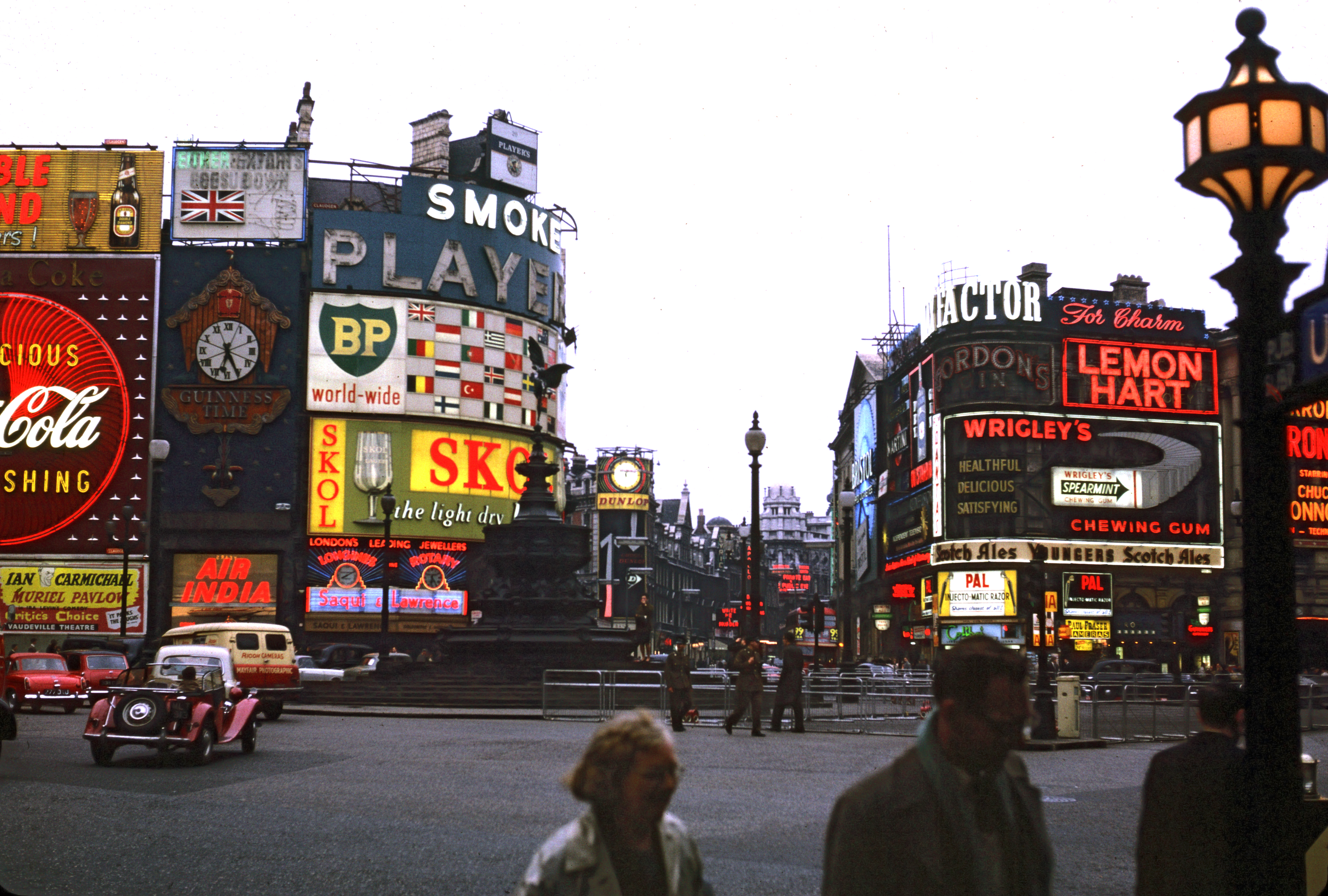
Piccadilly Circus in 1962

At the start of the 1960s, it was determined that the Circus needed to be redeveloped to allow for greater traffic flow. In 1962, Lord Holford presented a plan which would have created a "double-decker" Piccadilly Circus; the upper deck would have been an elevated pedestrian concourse linking the buildings around the perimeter of the Circus, with the lower deck being solely for traffic, most of the ground-level pedestrian areas having been removed to allow for greater vehicle flow. This concept was kept alive throughout the rest of the 1960s. A final scheme in 1972 proposed three octagonal towers (the highest 240 feet (73 m) tall) to replace the Trocadero, the Criterion and the "Monico" buildings. The plans were permanently rejected by Sir Keith Joseph and Ernest Marples; the key reason given was that Holford's scheme only allowed for a 20% increase in traffic, and the Government required 50%.

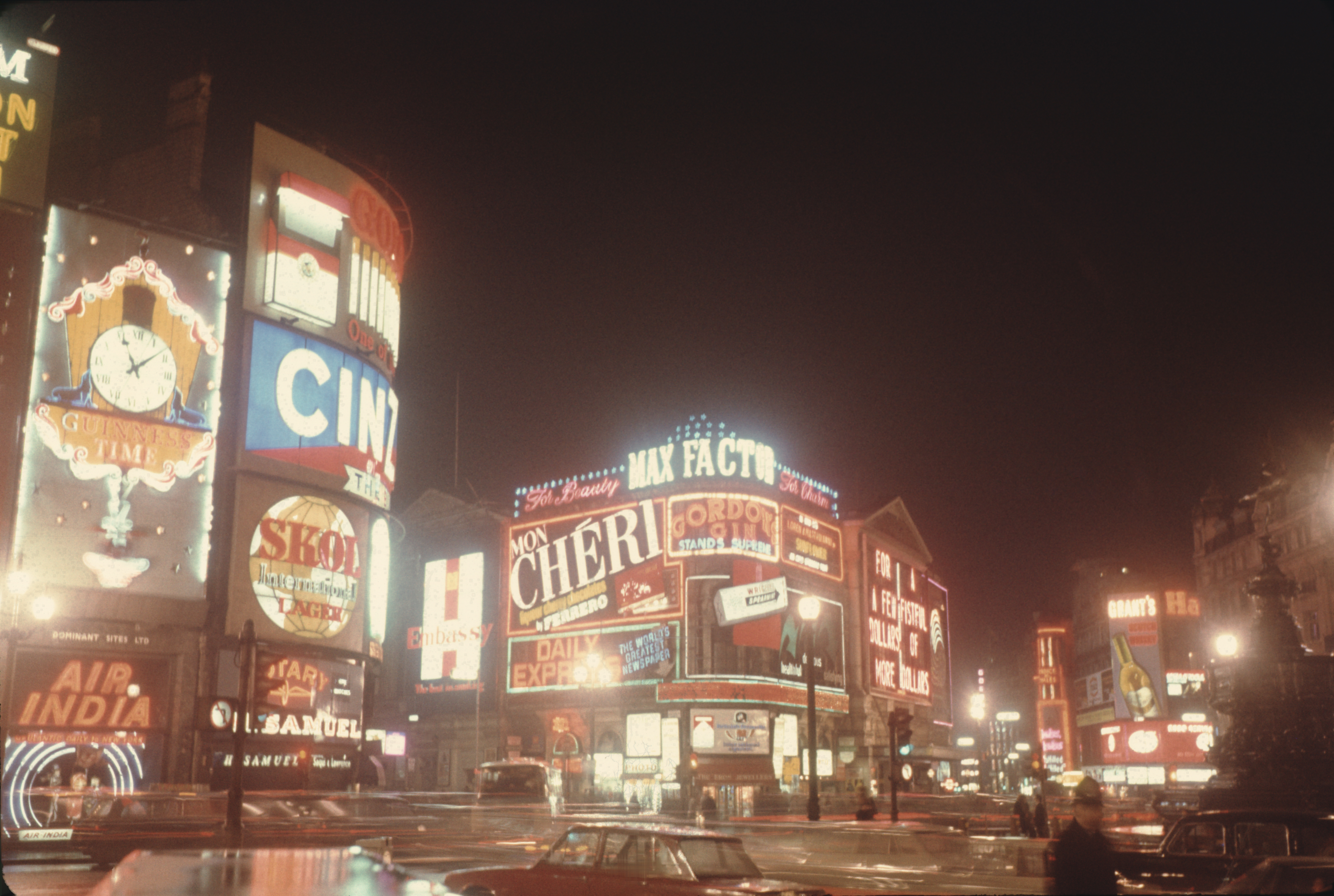
Piccadilly Circus in 1970

The Holford plan is referenced in the short-form documentary film "Goodbye, Piccadilly", produced by the Rank Organisation in 1967 as part of their Look at Life series when it was still seriously expected that Holford's recommendations would be acted upon. Piccadilly Circus has since escaped major redevelopment, apart from extensive ground-level pedestrianisation around its south side in the 1980s.

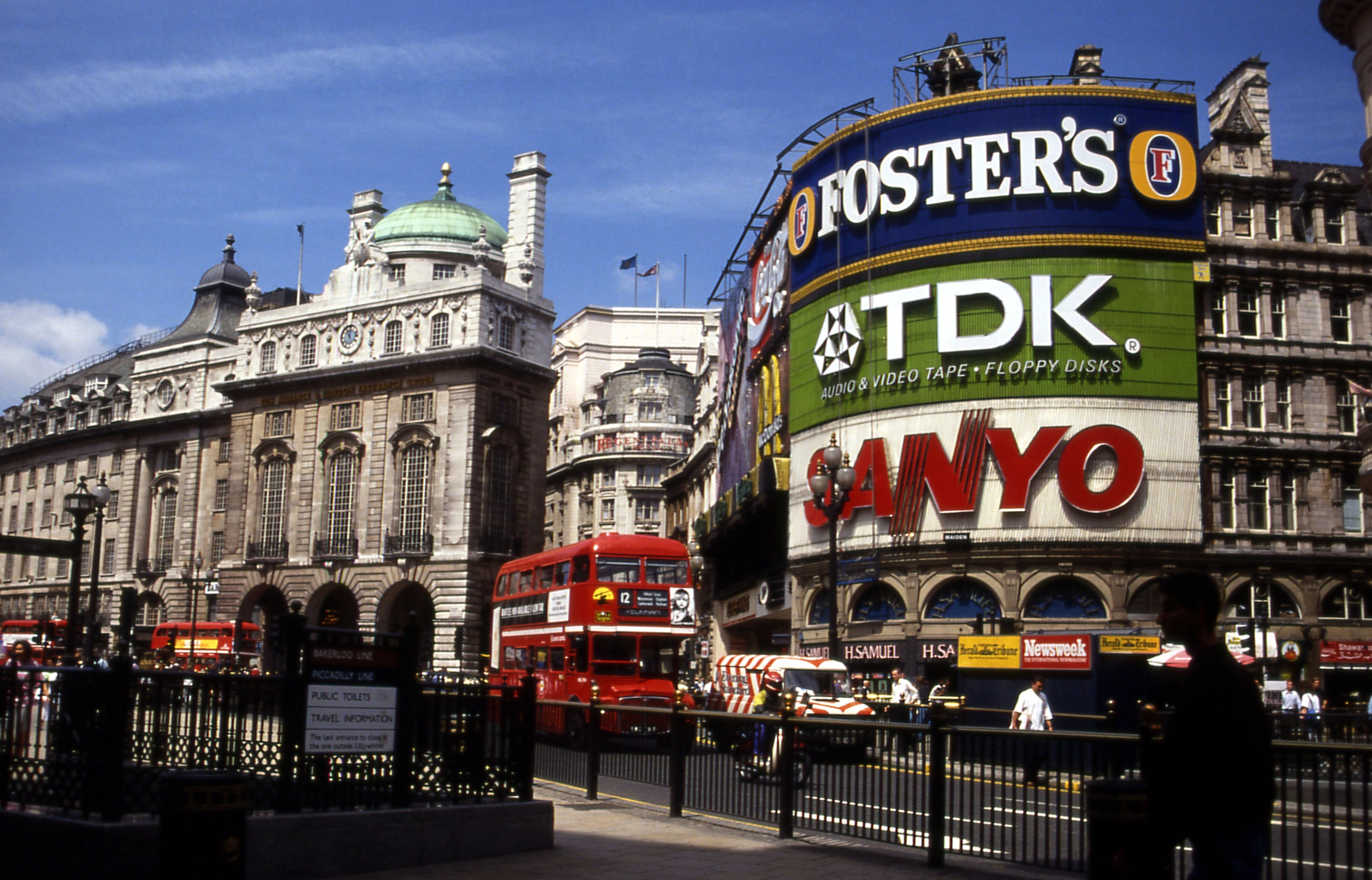
Piccadilly Circus in 1992

The Circus has been targeted by Irish republican terrorists multiple times. On 24 June 1939 an explosion occurred, although no injuries were caused. On 25 November 1974 a bomb injured 16 people. A 2 lb bomb exploded on 6 October 1992, injuring five people.

The Shaftesbury Memorial Fountain at Piccadilly Circus was erected in 1893 to commemorate the philanthropic works of Anthony Ashley Cooper, 7th Earl of Shaftesbury. It was removed from the Circus twice and moved from the centre once. The first time was in 1922, so that Charles Holden's new tube station could be built directly below it. The fountain returned in 1931. During the Second World War, the fountain was removed for the second time and replaced by advertising hoardings. It was returned again in 1948. When the Circus underwent reconstruction work in the late 1980s, the entire fountain was moved from the centre of the junction at the beginning of Shaftesbury Avenue to its present position at the southwestern corner.

== Location and sights ==
Piccadilly Circus is surrounded by tourist attractions, including the Shaftesbury Memorial, Criterion Theatre, London Pavilion and retail stores. Nightclubs, restaurants and bars are located in the area and neighbouring Soho, including the former Chinawhite club.

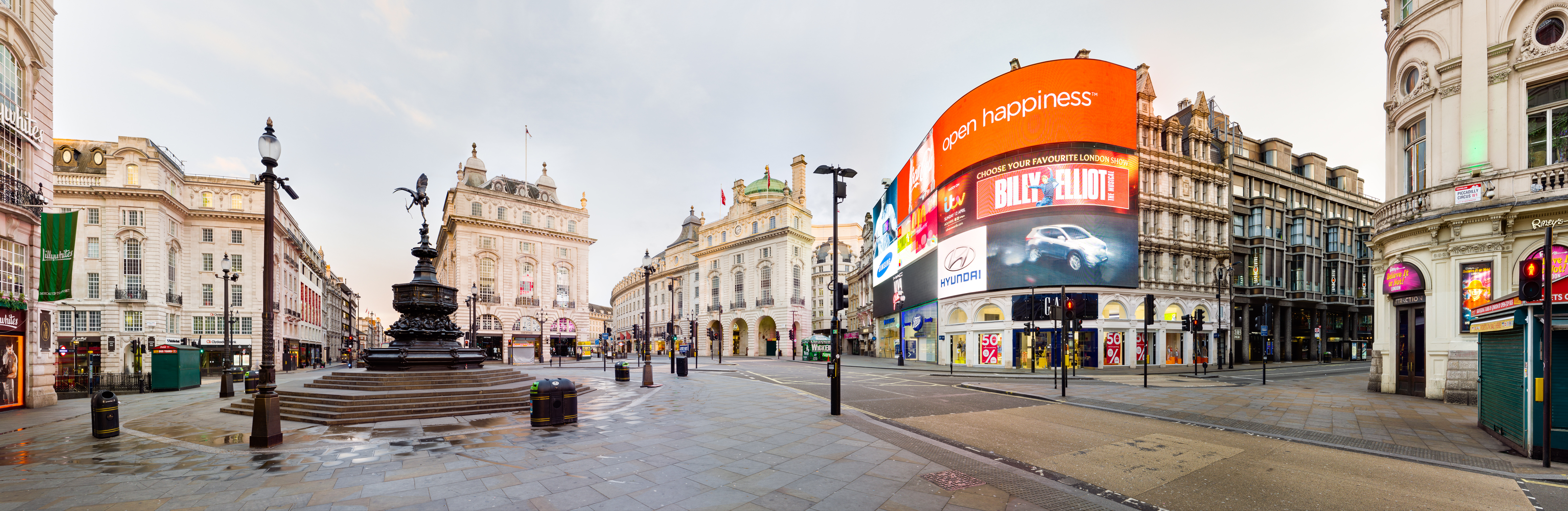
Panorama of Piccadilly Circus in 2015 from the southern side in front of Lillywhites

=== Illuminated signs ===
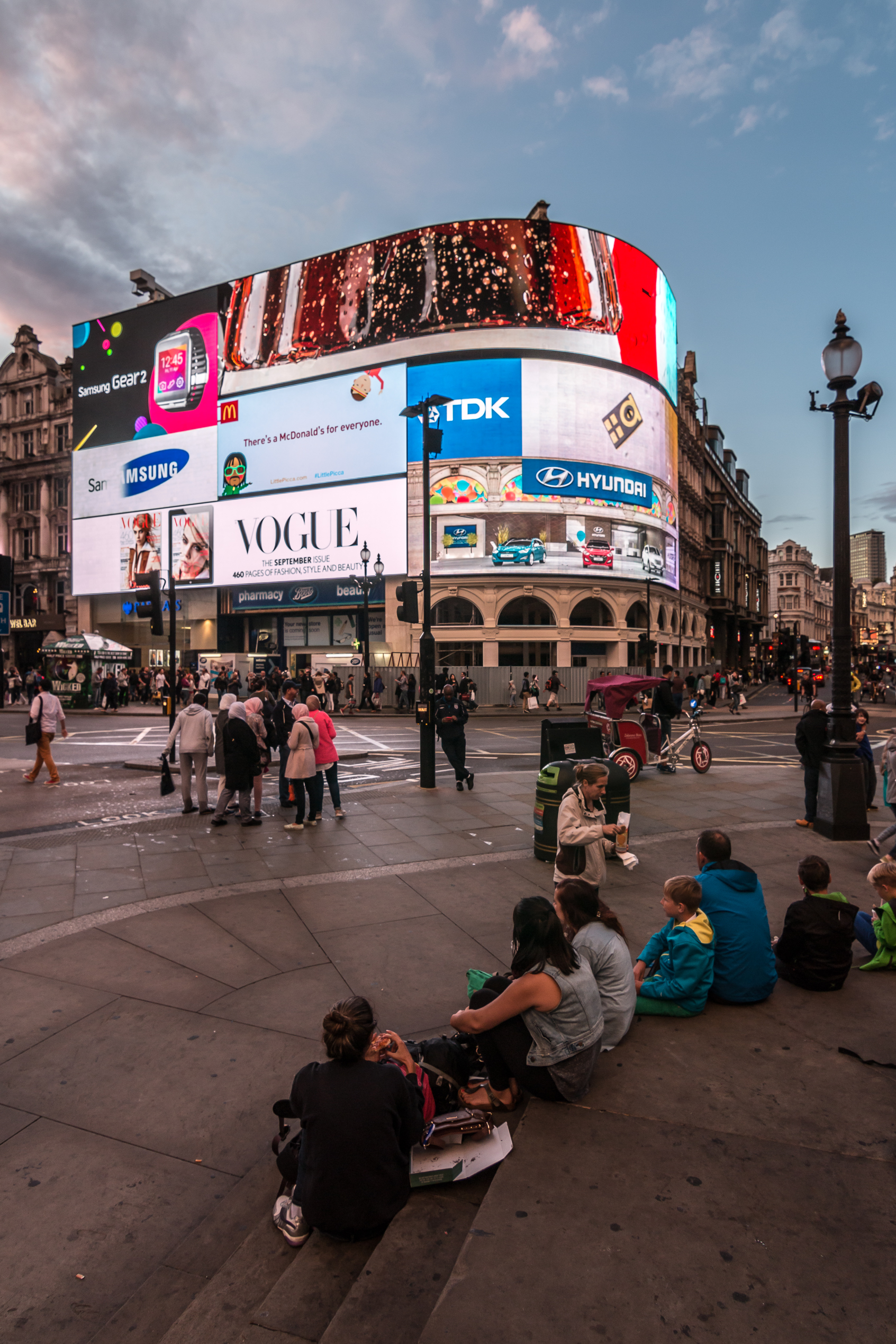
Illuminated signs of Piccadilly Circus in 2014

Piccadilly Circus was surrounded by illuminated advertising hoardings on buildings, starting in 1908 with a Perrier sign, but only one building now carries them, the one in the northwestern corner between Shaftesbury Avenue and Glasshouse Street. The site is unnamed (usually referred to as "Monico" after the Café Monico, which used to be on the site); its addresses are 44/48 Regent Street, 1/6 Sherwood Street, 17/22 Denman Street and 1/17 Shaftesbury Avenue, and it has been owned by property investor Landsec since the 1970s.

The earliest signs used incandescent light bulbs; these were replaced with neon lights and with moving signs (there was a large Guinness clock at one time). The first neon sign was for the British meat extract Bovril. From December 1998, digital projectors were used for the Coke sign, the square's first digital billboard, while in the 2000s there was a gradual move to LED displays, which completely replaced neon lamps by 2011. The number of signs has reduced over the years as the rental costs have increased, and in January 2017 the six remaining advertising screens were switched off as part of their combination into one large ultra-high definition curved Daktronics display, turning the signs off during renovation for the longest time since the 1940s. On 26 October 2017, the new screen was switched on for the first time.

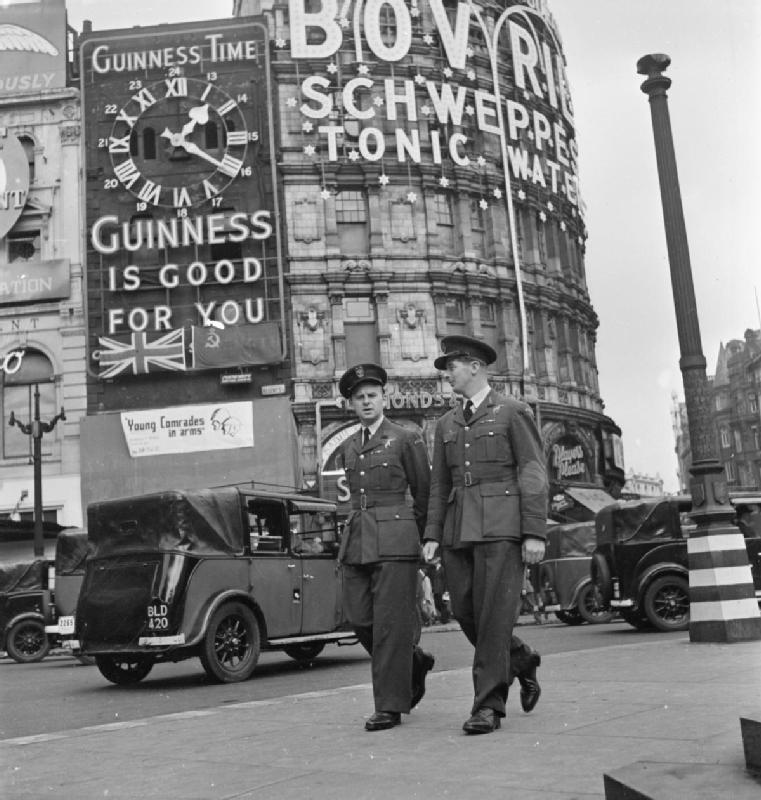
Guinness advertisement with their slogan, "Guinness is good for you", at Piccadilly Circus in 1942. The Bovril sign was installed in 1910.

Until the 2017 refurbishment, the site had six LED advertising screens above three large retail units facing Piccadilly Circus on the north side, occupied by Boots, Gap and a mix of smaller retail, restaurant and office premises fronting the other streets. A Burger King located under the Samsung advert, which had been a Wimpy Bar until 1989, closed in early 2008 and was converted into a Barclays bank.

- Coca-Cola has had a sign at Piccadilly Circus since 1954. In September 2003, the previous digital projector board and the site that had been occupied by Nescafé was replaced with a state-of-the-art LED video display that curves round with the building. Before Nescafé, a neon advertisement for Foster's occupied the spot from 1987 until 1999, and from 1978 to 1987 it was used by Philips Electronics. For several months in 2002, the Nescafé sign was replaced by a sign featuring the quote "Imagine all the people living life in peace" (from the song "Imagine") by former Beatle John Lennon. This was paid for by his widow Yoko Ono, who spent an estimated £150,000 to display an advert at this location. Coca-Cola, Diet Coke, Coca-Cola Zero, Fanta, Sprite and Vitamin Water have all been advertised in the space.
- Hyundai Motors sign launched on 29 September 2011. It replaced a sign for Sanyo which had occupied the space since around early 1988 (slightly modified in 2004), the last to be run using neon lights rather than Hyundai's computerised LED screen. Earlier Sanyo signs with older logos had occupied the position since 1978, although these were only half the size of the later space.
- McDonald's added its sign in 1987, replacing one for BASF. The sign was changed from neon to LED in 2001. A bigger, brighter screen was installed by Daktronics in 2008.
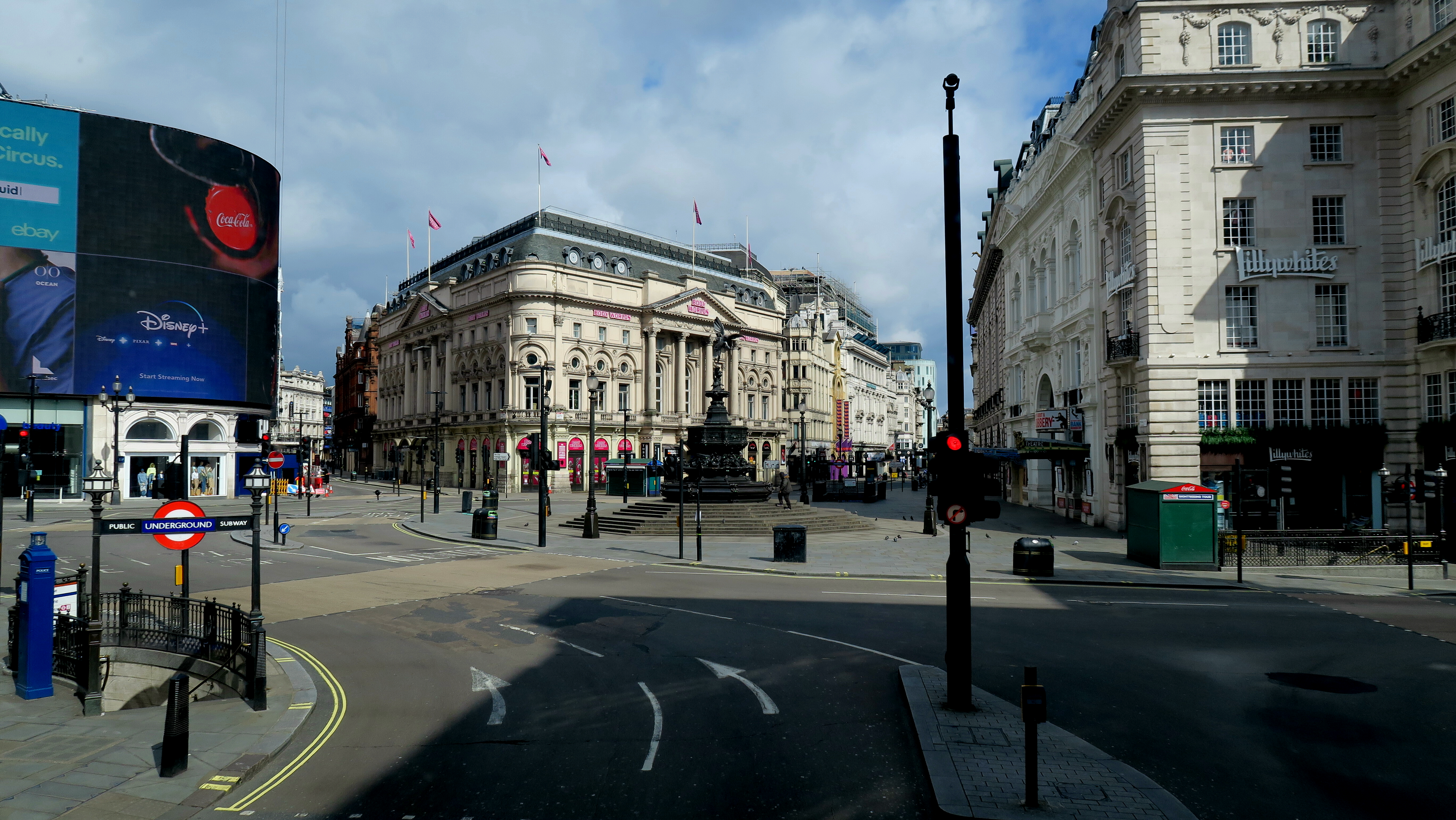
  Piccadilly Circus during the COVID-19 lockdown in March 2020
- Samsung added its sign in November 1994, the space having been previously occupied by Canon Inc. (1978–84) and Panasonic (1984–94). The sign was changed from neon to LED in summer 2005. The screen was upgraded and improved in autumn 2011.
- L'Oreal, Hunter Original and eBay both had signs in the Piccadilly circus billboards since October 2017. (Note: The Piccadilly lights have switched off for Refurbishment until Autumn, But eBay, L'Oreal, and Hunter have planned to advertise in the Piccadilly Circus lights since the refurbishment is done, and instead of Amazon, eBay instead advertise on the Billboards, which may be the former spot for Nikon.)
- One Piccadilly, the highest resolution of all the LED displays was installed by Daktronics, in late 2013, underneath the Samsung and McDonald's signs. It allowed other companies to advertise for both short- and long-term leases, increasing the amount of advertising space but using the same screen for multiple brands. Prior to this an earlier, smaller LED screen called Piccadilly Lite occupied the space from 3 December 2007 to 2013. The space has also been occupied by JVC (1978–84), Carlsberg (1984–2003) and Budweiser (2003–07).
- The Curve, a similar space to One Piccadilly, was added in 2015, replacing a space previously occupied by Schweppes (1920–61), BP (1961–67), Cinzano (1967–78), Fujifilm (1978–86), Kodak (1986–90) and TDK (1990–2015). Burberry was using the space as of December 2015.
- LG was added in February 2007 on the roof of Coventry House, which diagonally faces Piccadilly Circus. Its sign is a large LED video advertising display for LGE, the British arm of the South Korean electronics group. The new display also incorporates a scrolling ticker of Sky News headlines. Before LG, Vodafone had a neon sign installed on that spot, which displayed both its logo and personal messages that could be submitted on a special website and displayed at a certain time and date.

On special occasions the lights are switched off, such as the deaths of Winston Churchill in 1965 and Diana, Princess of Wales in 1997. On 21 June 2007, they were switched off for one hour as part of the Lights Out London campaign. After the death of Elizabeth II, all advertising on Piccadilly Circus was replaced with an image honouring the Queen, as part of a suspension of out-of-home advertising agreed upon by the industry.

Other companies and brands that have had signs on the site were Bovril, Volkswagen, Max Factor, Wrigley's Spearmint, Skol, Air India and Gold Flake (as Will's Gold Flake Cigarettes).

Since 2020, the Cultural Institute of Radical Contemporary Arts has broadcast specially commissioned two-minute artworks for the screens, broadcast at the same time each evening. In 2022 the segments were shown at 8:22 p.m.

=== Shaftesbury Memorial and the statue of Anteros ===
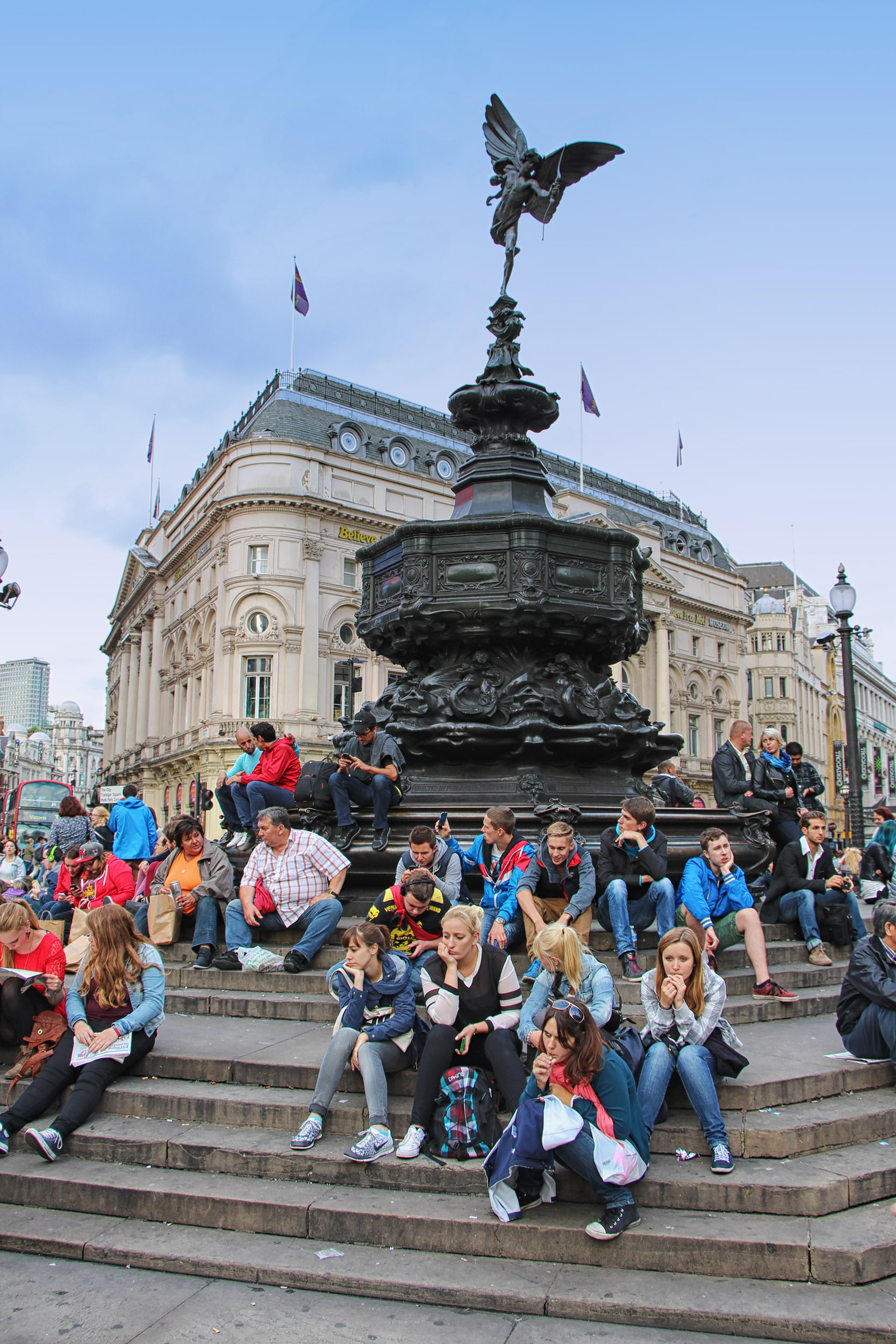
Tourists sitting on the steps of the Shaftesbury Memorial Fountain

At the south-eastern side of the Circus, moved after World War II from its original position in the centre, stands the Shaftesbury Memorial Fountain, erected in 1892–1893 to commemorate the philanthropic works of Lord Shaftesbury, a Victorian politician, philanthropist and social reformer. The subject of the Memorial is the Greek god Anteros and was given the name The Angel of Christian Charity but is generally mistaken for his brother Eros.

=== Criterion Theatre ===
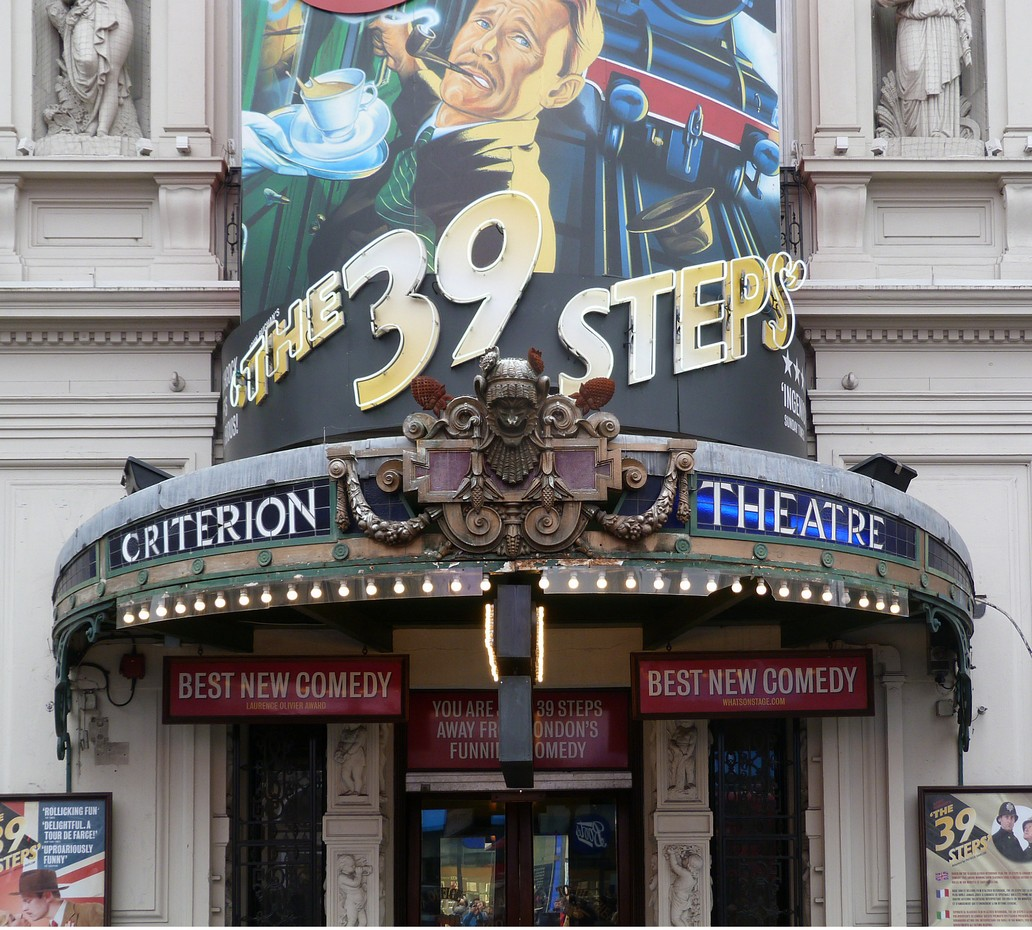
Entrance canopy to the Criterion Theatre in 2015 showing The 39 Steps

The Criterion Theatre, a Grade II* listed building, stands on the south side of Piccadilly Circus. Apart from the box office area, the entire theatre, with nearly 600 seats, is underground and is reached by descending a tiled stairway. Columns are used to support both the dress circle and the upper circle, restricting the views of some of the seats inside.

The theatre was designed by Thomas Verity and opened as a theatre on 21 March 1874, although original plans were for it to become a concert hall. Actor and theatre proprietor Charles Wyndham became the manager of the Criterion in 1875, and under him it became one of the leading light comedy houses in London. In 1883, it was forced to close to improve ventilation and to replace gaslights with electric lights and was reopened the following year. The theatre closed in 1989 and was extensively renovated, reopening in October 1992. Recent productions at the Criterion include The 39 Steps, a parody play adapted from the 1935 film by Alfred Hitchcock, with the play running for nine years at the venue from 2006 to 2015.

=== London Pavilion ===
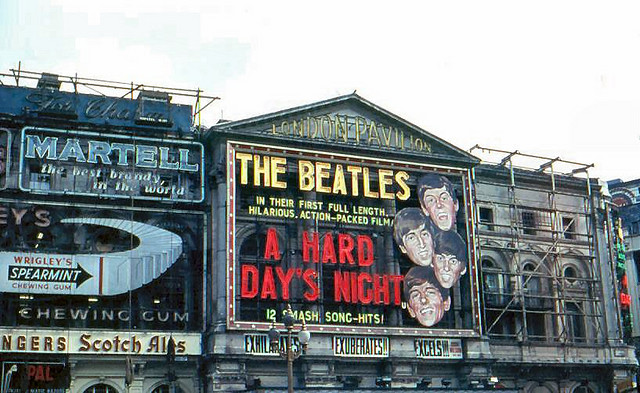
London Pavilion cinema in 1964 showing A Hard Day's Night

On the north-eastern side of Piccadilly Circus, on the corner between Shaftesbury Avenue and Coventry Street, is the London Pavilion. The first building bearing the name was built in 1859 and was a music hall. In 1885, Shaftesbury Avenue was built through the former site of the Pavilion, and a new London Pavilion was constructed, which also served as a music hall. In 1923, electric billboards were erected on the side of the building.

In 1934, the building underwent significant structural alteration and was converted into a cinema. In October 1962 it premiered Dr. No, the first James Bond film, and in July 1964 was the venue for the premiere of A Hard Day's Night, the musical comedy film starring the Beatles. In 1986, the building was rebuilt, preserving the 1885 façade, and converted into a shopping arcade. In 2000, the building was connected to the neighbouring Trocadero Centre, and signage on the building was altered in 2003 to read "London Trocadero". The basement of the building connects with the Underground station.

=== Major shops ===
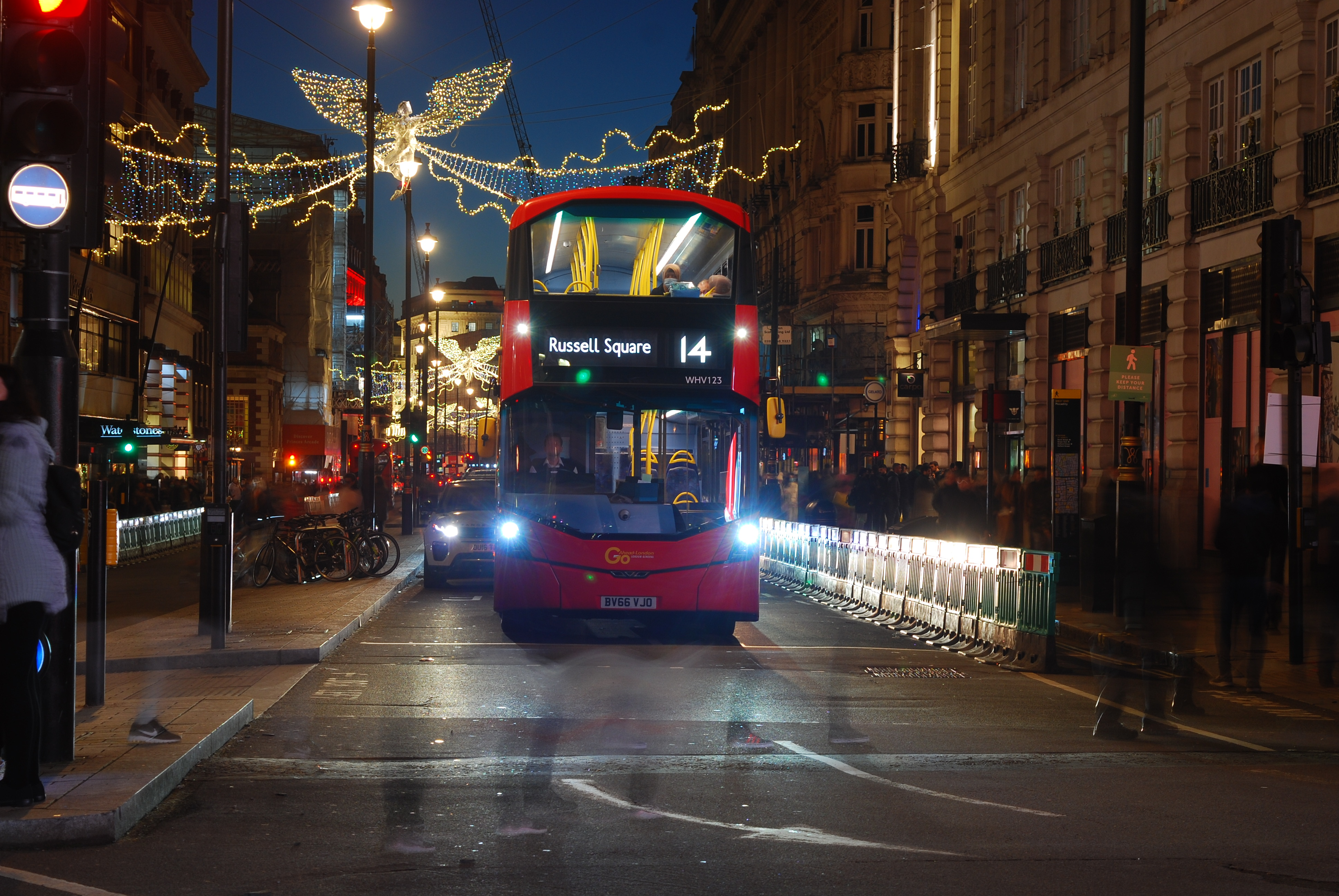
The view from Picadilly Circus onto Regent Street, December 2020

The former Swan & Edgar department store on the west side of the circus between Piccadilly and Regent Street was built in 1928–29 to a design by Reginald Blomfield. Since the closure of the department store in the early 1980s, the building has been successively the flagship London store of music chains Tower Records, Virgin Megastore and Zavvi.

Lillywhites is a major retailer of sporting goods located on the corner of the circus and Lower Regent Street, next to the Shaftesbury fountain. It moved to its present site in 1925. Lillywhites is popular with tourists, and they regularly offer sale items, including international football jerseys up to 90% off. Nearby Fortnum & Mason is often considered to be part of the Piccadilly Circus shopping area and is known for its expansive food hall.

=== County Fire Office ===
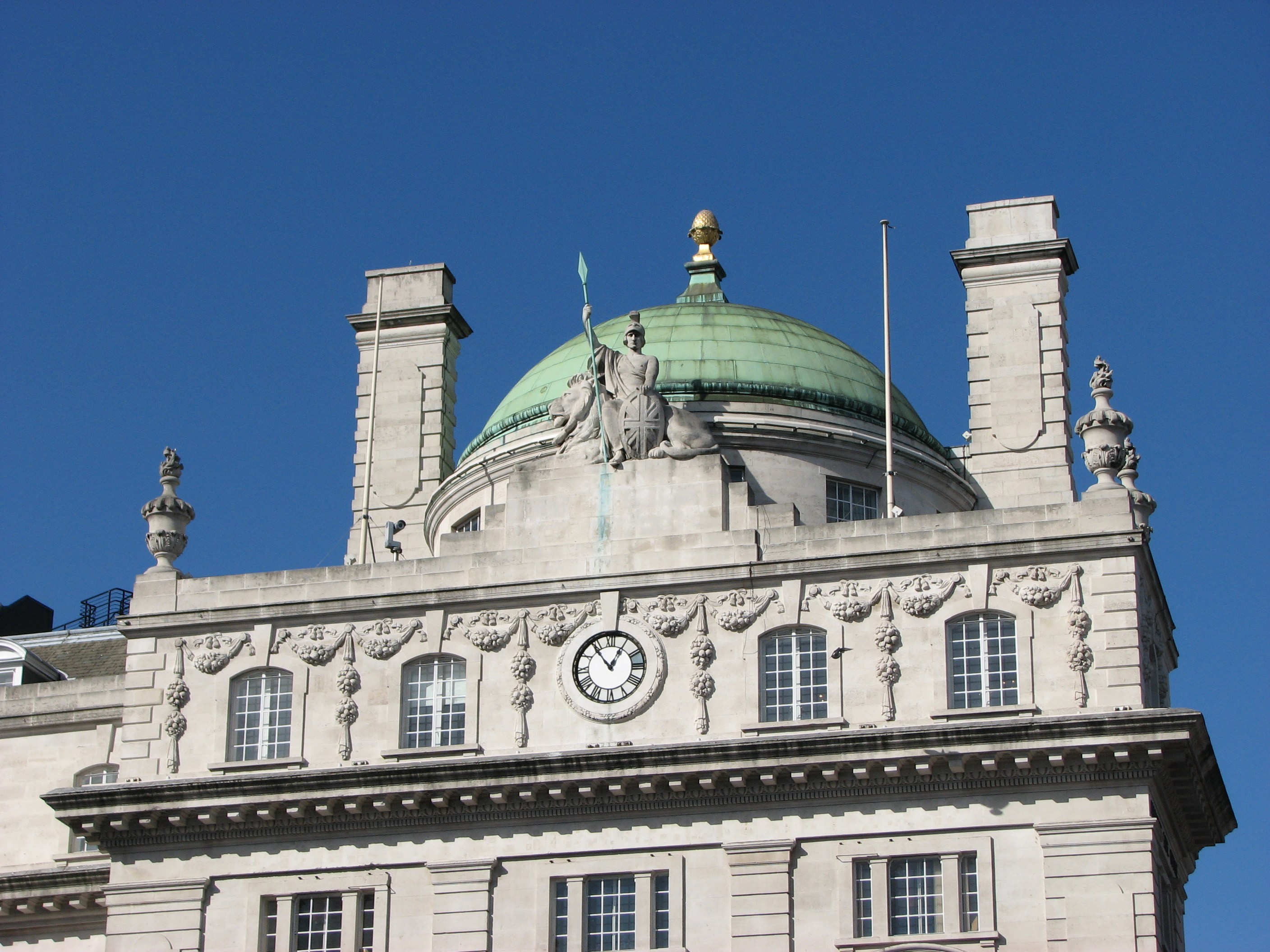
Roof of the County Fire Office, with dome and statue of Britannia

Dominating the north side of the circus, on the corner of Glasshouse Street, is the County Fire Office building, with a statue of Britannia on the roof. The original building was designed by John Nash as the extreme southern end of his Regent Street Quadrant. Its dramatic façade was clearly influenced by Inigo Jones's old Somerset House. Although Robert Abraham was the County Fire Insurance Company's architect, it was probably Nash who was instrumental in choosing the design. In 1924 the old County Fire Office was demolished and replaced with a similar but much coarser building designed by Reginald Blomfield, but retaining the statue of Britannia. During the London Blitz it was the only building in the Circus to be damaged, with a few window panes blown out. The building is Grade II listed.

== The London Underground station ==
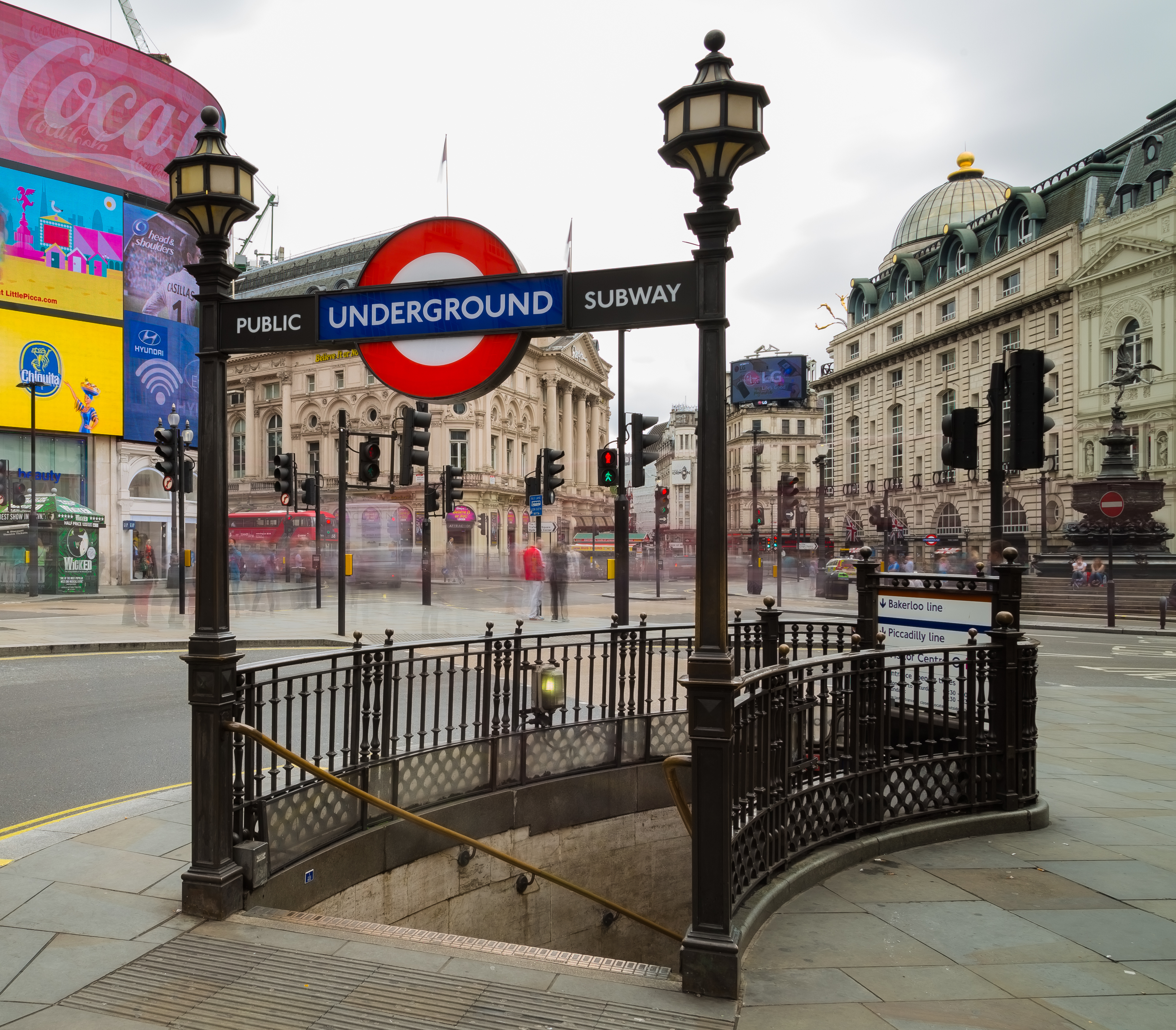
Station subway entrance to Piccadilly Circus tube station

Piccadilly Circus tube station on the London Underground is located directly beneath Piccadilly Circus itself, with entrances at every corner. It is one of the few stations in the network which have no associated buildings above ground and is fully underground. The below ground concourse and subway entrances are Grade II listed.

The station is served by the Bakerloo and Piccadilly lines.

== Demonstrations ==
The Circus' status as a high-profile public space has made it the destination for numerous political demonstrations, including the February 15, 2003 anti-war protest and the "Carnival Against Capitalism" protest against the 39th G8 summit in 2013.

== In popular culture ==
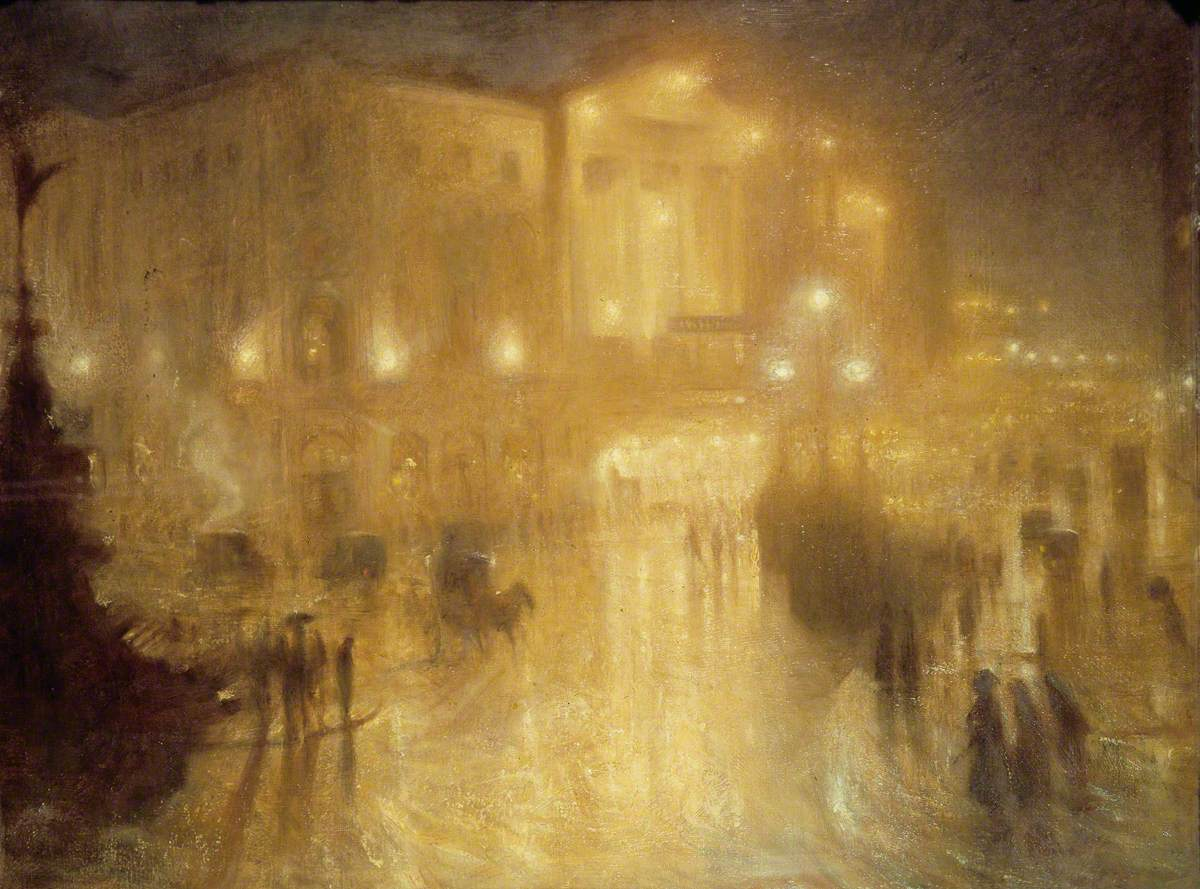
A Wet Night at Piccadilly Circus by Arthur Hacker, 1910

The phrase it's like Piccadilly Circus is commonly used in the UK to refer to a place or situation which is extremely busy with people. It has been said that a person who stays long enough at Piccadilly Circus will eventually bump into everyone they know. Probably because of this connection, during World War II, "Piccadilly Circus" was the code name given to the Allies' D-Day invasion fleet's assembly location in the English Channel.

Piccadilly Circus has inspired artists and musicians. Piccadilly Circus (1912) is the name and subject of a painting by British artist Charles Ginner, part of the Tate Britain collection. Sculptor Paul McCarthy also has a 320-page two-volume edition of video stills by the name of Piccadilly Circus. In the lyrics of their song "Mother Goose", on the Aqualung album from 1971, the rock band Jethro Tull tells "And a foreign student said to me: 'was it really true there were elephants, lions too, in Picadilly Circus?'". Bob Marley mentioned Piccadilly Circus in his song "Kinky Reggae", on the Catch a Fire album from 1973.

L. S. Lowry's painting Piccadilly Circus, London (1960), part of Lord Charles Forte's collection for almost three decades, sold for £5,641,250 when auctioned for the first time at Christie's 20th Century British & Irish Art sale on 16 November 2011. Contemporary British painter Carl Randall's painting 'Piccadilly Circus' (2017) is a large monochrome canvas depicting the area at night with crowds, the making of which involved painting over 70 portraits from life.

== See also ==
- Bukit Bintang, Kuala Lumpur
- Cambridge Circus, London
- Chinawhite (nightclub)
- Oxford Circus
- Punto Obelisco (Obelisk Point, Buenos Aires)
- Sankofa Square, a major public square with commercial signage in Toronto, Canada
- Shaftesbury Avenue
- Shibuya Crossing, noted public space and crossroads in Tokyo
- Times Square, a noted road junction and public space in New York
