= Dead Pixels =

2019 British sitcom

- Genre: Sitcom; Fantasy
- Created by: Jon Brown
- Written by: Jon Brown
- Starring: Alexa Davies; Will Merrick; Sargon Yelda; Charlotte Ritchie; David Mumeni
- Composers: Paul Arnold and Andrew Barnabas
- Country of origin: United Kingdom
- Original language: English
- No. of series: 2
- No. of episodes: 12

Production
- Running time: 25 minutes

Original release
- Network: E4
- Release: 28 March 2019 – 16 February 2021

Dead Pixels is a British television sitcom, which began airing on E4 on 28 March 2019. It focuses on the obsession of three friends, Meg, Nicky and Usman, for a fictional massive multiplayer online role-playing game (MMORPG) called Kingdom Scrolls.

In July 2019, E4 renewed the programme for a second series which filmed later that year, for an intended spring 2020 broadcast that was delayed until 26 January 2021.

== Cast ==
=== Main characters ===
- Alexa Davies as Megan "Meg" Jefferies, whose eagerness to continue playing Kingdom Scrolls is helped by her attraction to a new workmate, who she invites to play the game in an attempt to get closer to him, to the chagrin of the rest of the group.
- Will Merrick as Nicholas "Nicky" Kettle, whose attitude to playing Kingdom Scrolls – and in fact his view on life – is considerably more apathetic than that of his flatmate, Meg; his burgeoning attraction to her the primary reason he is determined to complete the game.
- Sargon Yelda as Usman, an American airline pilot whose addiction to Kingdom Scrolls consistently takes him away from family life.
- Charlotte Ritchie as Alison, the flatmate of Meg and Nicky whose attempts to get the two to live a more 'normal' life falter – and is the subject of barbs from them as a result of living in the real world.
- David Mumeni as Russell, a workmate of Meg's who naively blunders into the game and his personal life.

=== Recurring ===
- Noush Skaugen as Zara, Usman's wife, who begins to get closer to a work friend in light of her husband's gaming addiction.
- Rose Matafeo as Daisy (series 2), a popular Kingdom Scrolls player who has a dedicated legion of followers and starts to get close to Nicky both in the game and in reality.
- Al Roberts as DVT (series 2), the leader of The Twelve Disciples, a group of Daisy's ardent followers, who initially accept Nicky but later begin persistently trolling him to come between the two.
- Shaq B Grant as Greg (series 2), a boiler repairman who begins a complicated relationship with Meg.

== Episodes ==
Series	Episodes	Originally released	
Series	Episodes	First released	Last released
1	6	28 March 2019	2 May 2019
2	6	26 January 2021	16 February 2021

=== Series 1 (2019) ===
All episodes were made available on All4 after the broadcast of the first episode.

No. overall	No. in season	Title	Directed by	Written by	Original release date	UK viewers (millions) (Note: Four-screen, 28-day data)
1	1	"Bears"	Al Campbell	Jon Brown	28 March 2019	0.57
Meg, Nicky and Usman's long-term gaming group is upended by the arrival of awkward noob Russell – a new workmate of Meg's she finds attractive – but their irritation soon turns Machiavellian as they realise Russell's character has many valuable in-game purchases.
2	2	"Tanadaal"	Al Campbell	Jon Brown	4 April 2019	0.49
The original threesome are thrown into woe mode by the announcement of casting for the Kingdom Scrolls movie – and head earnestly into protesting the decision, while they enjoy winding Russell up over his inadvertent invitation of a 14-year-old gamer to meet up IRL.
3	3	"Betrothal"	Al Campbell	Jon Brown	11 April 2019	0.42
Nicky's suggestion he and Meg become married in the game for permanent experience points boosts just complicates their IRL relationship further, especially as he becomes overly expectant of Meg and gets annoyed at her readiness to spend more time away from the game.
4	4	"Big Nose"	Al Campbell	Jon Brown	18 April 2019	N/A (<0.35) (Note: Not reported in the weekly top 15 programmes for four-screen viewer ratings.)
The death of a somewhat high profile Kingdom Scrolls livestreamer affects the gang differently; Meg takes to it herself, adopting the fallen's habits of a wall of beans (but not quite stretching as far as to wear a nappy), while Nicky becomes aloof – and their capitulatory attendance at Alison's flat party makes them consider whether the virtual or real world is best for them.
5	5	"Patricide"	Al Campbell	Jon Brown	25 April 2019	0.40
Nicky is finally able to one-up his father – who has silently disapproved of his son's life choices so far – by killing him repeatedly in-game, and takes the confidence boost it gives him a little too far. Meg tries to work out her relationship with Russell by luring him into a virtual sex dungeon.
6	6	"Hive-Mother"	Al Campbell	Jon Brown	2 May 2019	0.42
It's what they've been waiting for two years: the day they slay the Hive Mother. The big event doesn't happen without some offscreen drama, though, as everyone has a reckoning about the game's role in their lives; Meg struggles to keep the boundaries between real life and the game regarding her attraction to Russell, Nicky becomes frustrated at his presence at the cosplay event in the flat, and Usman is faced with an ultimatum by his ever-distancing wife.

=== Series 2 (2021) ===
All episodes were made available on All4 following the broadcast premiere of the first two episodes.

No. overall	No. in season	Title	Directed by	Written by	Original release date	UK viewers (millions) (Note: TV-only, 7-day data)
7	1	"Crates"	Jamie Jay Johnson	Jon Brown	26 January 2021	0.29
Eight long months have passed and the expansion pack is finally out... but the excitement and hype in the build up soon comes crashing down; though while Meg and Nicky's initial bereavement the game they love has transitioned into something more suited to the younger Fortnite crowd – with added microtransactions and lore-departing character designs – they soon manage to turn it to their advantage – largely so Nicky can find a way of funding his new loot crate addiction and Meg can avoid the alternative: venturing outside and talking to people.
8	2	"The Chair"	Jamie Jay Johnson	Jon Brown	26 January 2021	0.30
Alison becomes worried about Meg's physical health after discovering she's sitting down in the shower. Nicky sells his avatar to Russell so he can buy more crates, and his new one is identified as easy prey by a mysterious new female player... who he instantly falls in love with after she performs a rather crude death move on his character. Usman hides out in the garage to spend an unexpected few days off while his family believe he is away.
9	3	"Mission"	Jamie Jay Johnson	D C Jackson	2 February 2021	N/A
Meg and Nicky's frustration at being persistently unable to complete an in-game mission is compounded by the news a tradesman will be visiting the flat... which is soon remedied for Meg when she finds him attractive and attempts to act as 'normal' as she can around him. Nicky finds himself part of a group of followers of the mysterious Daisy character – and is unsure how to react when she requests a voice-chat between the two. Usman has taken to flogging himself as punishment for failing the in-game mission, and Russell's living situation appears to be bordering on accidental prostitution.
10	4	"Raid Boss"	Jamie Jay Johnson	Jon Brown	9 February 2021	N/A
Nicky's at-first blasé attitude towards the various trolling exercises directed at him by Daisy's acolytes – both in-game and IRL – is compromised when it actually threatens their burgeoning closeness. Alison manages to solve Meg's relationship crisis as she undergoes one herself, and Usman takes the game to therapy with an unexpected breakthrough.
11	5	"Healthy Balance"	Jamie Jay Johnson	Jon Brown	16 February 2021	0.19
Meg and Nicky are beside themselves when they discover a highly-anticipated patch fix will take the entire evening to download, and are forced to commune in the flat. As defrosting the freezer proves an inadvertent bonding exercise, both are encouraged by Alison to take further steps in their relationships and lives to distance themselves from the game more, and adopt a 'healthy balance'... but only one of them reaps the results.
12	6	"Flanks/Yams"	Jamie Jay Johnson	Jon Brown	16 February 2021	0.20
Nicky has dived headfirst into preparing for Daisy's impending visit to the flat, with a special, 'hefty' meal of veal flanks and mashed yams on offer – and a dubious purchase of a new toilet. Meg, still raw from recent developments in her relationship, tries to cope by sourcing the very first version of Kingdom Scrolls and setting it up for the three of them to play together; the evening takes a dramatic turn when their attempts to finally finish a mission raises the unrequited tensions between the two that have been bubbling to the surface in a violent manner. As their frustrations collide with Alison's personal struggles, she reaches the end of her tether with the two, while Usman cannot help but take the game to his pregnant wife's hospital bedside. The episode ends with Alison's partner ending things with her, with Nicky and Meg inviting her to play the original Kingdom Scrolls (via a heritage server), to which she accepts. Usman then announces that Kingdom Scrolls is going mobile.

== Development ==
Dead Pixels started as Avatards, which was a part of the Comedy Blaps series on Channel 4's website in 2016, and has since expanded to what it is now. The series creators have been cited as wanting to create a more well-rounded portrayal of the lives of some gamers, noting that mainstream television does not have the best reputation for how it presents gamers on screen. It hopes to do this by showing both the funny and the thought provoking side of gaming and gaming culture. Both the writer of the series, Jon Brown, and the director, Al Campbell, have been described as "massive gamers".

== Reception ==
Dead Pixels was described by The Guardian as "wickedly entertaining" and "the sharpest new sitcom of 2019". Chortle said that the first episode of the show is "certainly funny and involving enough to entice any viewer". The Arts Desk noted that the action shifts are "cleverly visualised".

== US broadcast ==
In May 2020, The CW acquired the broadcast rights for the series. Originally procured to plump up the network's autumn 2020 schedule in light of production breakdowns during the COVID-19 pandemic, the series was later shifted to the network's summer 2020 slate instead, with its autumn slot being filled by Devils.

== Adaptation ==
An Indian version of the series was commissioned by Disney+ Hotstar in association with BBC Studios. It was produced by BBCS India and Tamada Media, written by Akshay Poolla and directed by Aditya Mandala. The series was released on 19 May 2023.

== See also ==
- The Guild (web series)
