= Sliced (TV series) =

British television sitcom

- Genre: Sitcom
- Written by: Phil Bowker; Samson Kayo
- Directed by: Al Campbell; Phil Bowker
- Starring: Samson Kayo; Theo Barklem-Biggs; Weruche Opia; David Mumeni; Phil Daniels; Danielle Vitalis; Racheal Ofori
- Country of origin: United Kingdom
- Original language: English
- No. of series: 2
- No. of episodes: 9

Production
- Executive producer: Pete Thornton
- Producer: Phil Bowker
- Editor: Gareth Heal
- Running time: 40 minutes

Original release
- Network: Dave
- Release: 15 May 2019 – 8 July 2021

Sliced is a British television sitcom which began airing on 15 May 2019. It was created and written by Phil Bowker and Samson Kayo for broadcast on Dave. The show follows two friends and fellow pizza delivery drivers Joshua and Ricky in south London, who just want to make some money, move out of their family homes and meet some women. The series stars David Mumeni, Phil Daniels, Kayo and Nahel Tzegai. In January 2020, it was renewed for a 6-episode second series, to premiere later in the year. Series 2 premiered on 3 June 2021.

== Cast ==
- Samson Kayo as Joshua
- Theo Barklem-Biggs as Ricky
- Weruche Opia as Naomi
- David Mumeni as Mario
- Phil Daniels as Scott
- Danielle Vitalis as Teeka (Series 1)
- Racheal Ofori as Teeka (Series 2)

== Episodes ==
Series	Episodes	Originally released	
Series	Episodes	First released	Last released
1	3	15 May 2019	17 May 2019
2	6	3 June 2021	8 July 2021

=== Series 1 (2019) ===
No. overall	No. in season	Title	Directed by	Written by	Original release date	U.K viewers (millions)
1	1	"Episode 1"	Al Campbell	Phil Bowker and Samson Kayo	15 May 2019	N/A
2	2	"Episode 2"	Al Campbell	Phil Bowker and Samson Kayo	16 May 2019	N/A
3	3	"Episode 3"	Al Campbell	Phil Bowker and Samson Kayo	17 May 2019	N/A

=== Series 2 (2021) ===
No. overall	No. in season	Title	Directed by	Written by	Original release date	U.K viewers (millions)
4	1	"You Must Be Joshua?"	Phil Bowker	Phil Bowker and Samson Kayo	3 June 2021	N/A
5	2	"8 Ounces"	Phil Bowker	Phil Bowker and Samson Kayo	10 June 2021	N/A
6	3	"We Only Wanted 20p"	Phil Bowker	Phil Bowker and Samson Kayo	17 June 2021	N/A
7	4	"I'm Vegan Now"	Phil Bowker	Phil Bowker and Samson Kayo	24 June 2021	N/A
8	5	"Graham?"	Phil Bowker	Phil Bowker and Samson Kayo	1 July 2021	N/A
9	6	"Mad Innit?"	Phil Bowker	Phil Bowker and Samson Kayo	8 July 2021	N/A
