= Punto Obelisco =

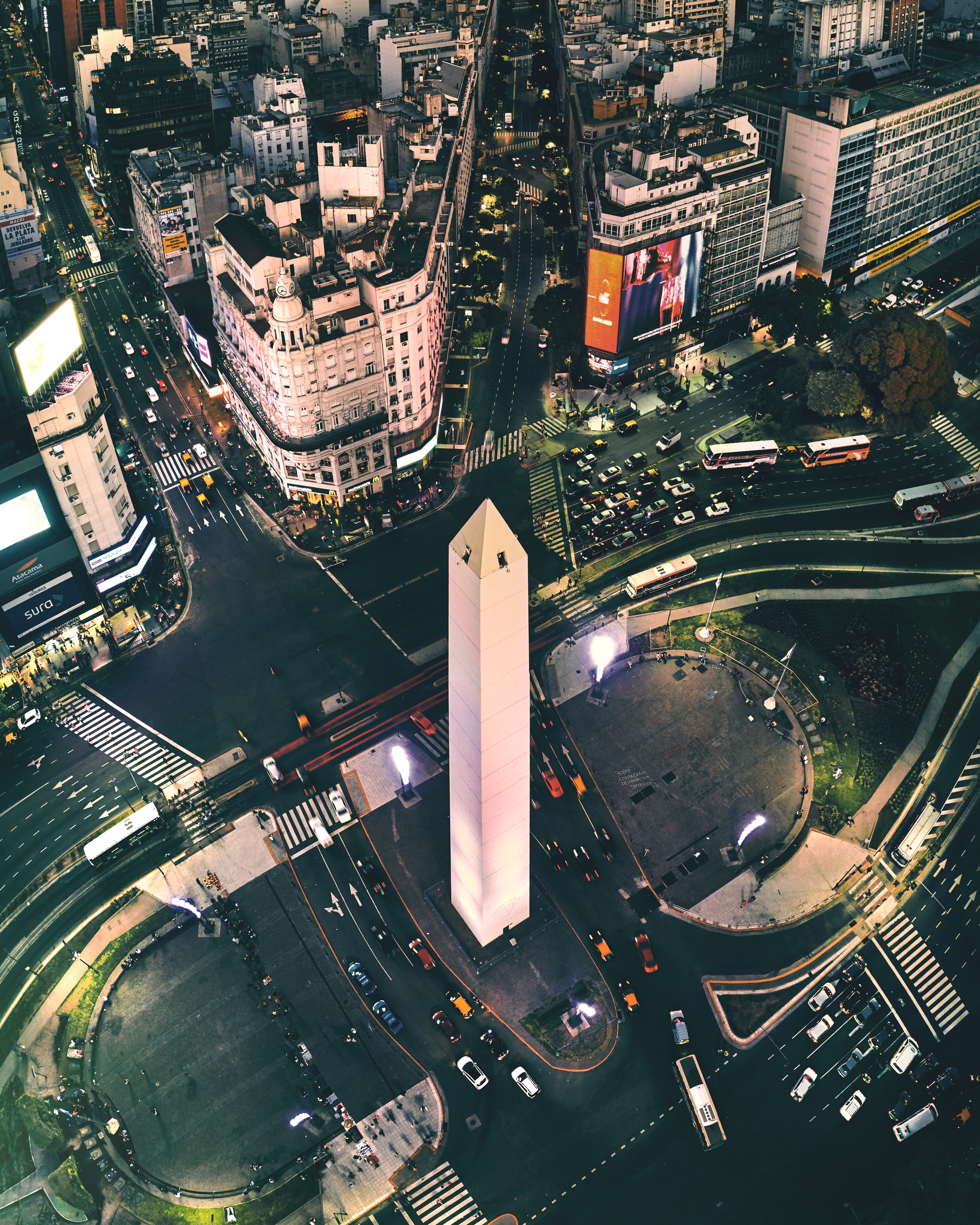
Aerial view of the Obelisco and its surroundings, 2018.

Punto Obelisco (Obelisk Point) is a zone around the Obelisk of Buenos Aires and the Plaza de la República. It is a project held by the city's government in order to enrich the surroundings of the monument and to make it the center of entertainment in the city. A zone combining the theatres avenue (Corrientes Avenue) and the lights of LED signs taking inspiration from Times Square in New York City, the Shibuya Crossing in Tokyo and Piccadilly Circus in London and runs through Avenida 9 de Julio between Rivadavia Avenue and Córdoba Avenue . It also includes a ticket sales stand.

== Landmarks ==
Obelisk of Buenos Aires

The Obelisco de Buenos Aires is a modern monument placed at the heart of Buenos Aires, Argentina. Porteños refer to it simply as El Obelisco.

Plaza de la República (Buenos Aires)

Plaza de la República (Republic Square) is a vast city square in Buenos Aires, capital of Argentina. It is located in the San Nicolás quarter, at the intersection of the city's three main arteries : Ninth of July Avenue, Corrientes Avenue, and Diagonal Norte. It derives its name and associations from a church once sited on the square, San Nicolás de Bari (demolished in the 1930s for the creation of 9 July Avenue), where the country's national flag was hoisted for the first time.

Teatro Colón

The Teatro Colón (Spanish) (Columbus Theatre) is the main opera house in Buenos Aires, Argentina, considered one of the best five opera houses in the world. It was opened on 25 May 1908 with Verdi's Aïda. The theatre was closed for refurbishment from October 2006 to May 2010.

TICKETS BsAs

It is a stand located in front of the Obelisk between Cerrito and Diagonal Norte streets. It centers the offer of shows and musicals of the city. The project was conceived by the AADET.

Coca-Cola Sign

The large Coca-Cola sign is located in Diagonal Norte and Carlos Pellegrini streets.

Ambito Financiero Sign

Ambito Financiero, has two sing in Punto Obelisco, in Corrientes and 9 de Julio, and the other screen in Corrientes and Diagonal Norte.
