= Samson Kayo =

British actor, comedian, and writer

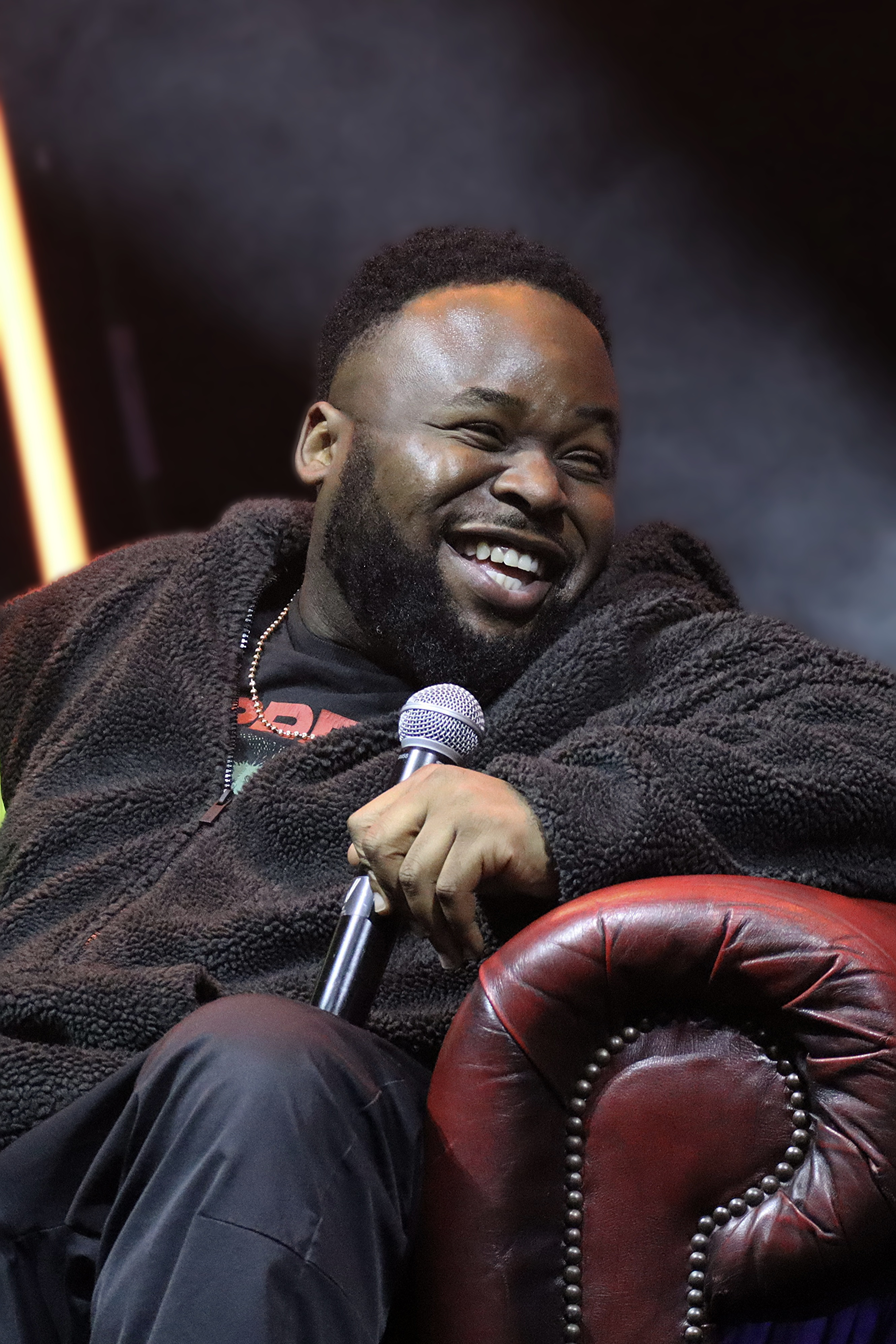
Kayo on stage at MCM London in October 2023

Samson Kayo (born 1991/1992) is a British actor, comedian, producer, and writer. He was nominated for the British Academy Television Award for Best Male Comedy Performance in 2018 for the BBC sketch show Famalam (2017–2020). He created, wrote and starred in the Sky One sitcom Bloods (2021–2022), and received a nomination for the same award in 2022. He won the Royal Television Society Programme Awards for Best Male Comedy Performance in the latter role in 2022, having also been nominated in 2019 and 2023. He also created and starred in Sliced (2019–2021), and his other credits include Youngers (2013), Timewasters (2017), and Our Flag Means Death (2022–2023).

== Biography ==
Kayo is of Nigerian descent. He said that growing up in Peckham, he only wanted to be a footballer, but developed an interest in comedy through Jim Carrey, Robin Williams, and British comedian Jocelyn Jee Esien, who inspired him as a black person to enter comedy. He was a childhood friend of John Boyega, with whom he attended church. When he went out to pick up an iron for his mother, he found an open audition for the Channel 4 comedy Youngers, and was cast. In 2017, he played a fictionalised version of will.i.am in the BBC Three improvised comedy series Murder in Successville.

Kayo was nominated for Best Male Comedy Performance at the 2018 British Academy Television Awards for his part in the BBC sketch show Famalam. From 2017 to 2019, he was part of the main cast of the ITV2 sitcom Timewasters, in which a Black British jazz quartet are transported through time to the London of the 1920s and 1950s in each series. He created, wrote and played the lead role in the takeaway-based sitcom Sliced on Dave from 2019 to 2021. He also created and plays the lead Maleek on paramedic-focused sitcom Bloods, which debuted on Sky One in 2021 while being based on an eight-minute short film on Sky Arts. He was nominated for Best Male Comedy Performance at the 2022 British Academy Television Awards for this role, and won the same award at the year's Royal Television Society Programme Awards.

In 2020, Kayo featured in Nick Frost and Simon Pegg's horror comedy series Truth Seekers. A year later, he starred in David Jenkins and Taika Waititi's pirate-based romantic comedy series Our Flag Means Death, which was produced in the United States. He told The Irish Times that although many British actors of colour found more opportunity in the United States, he was committed to making more British series.

Kayo's first voice performance was as Baby Bear in Puss in Boots: The Last Wish (2022), with Antonio Banderas in the title role.

== Filmography ==
=== Film ===
Year	Title	Role	Notes
2018	Grandpa's Great Escape	Gravedigger Vince	Television film
2020	Dolittle	Pirate	
2022	The Bubble	Bola	
2022	Puss in Boots: The Last Wish	Baby Bear (voice)	
2025	F1	Cashman	
2026	Hexed †	TBA (voice)	
2027	Voltron †		Post-production

=== Television ===
Year	Title	Role	Notes
2013	Youngers	Boss Fury	
2015	The Javone Prince Show	Various	
2016	We the Jury	Don	
2017	Murder in Successville	Will.i.am	
2017	Comedy Playhouse	Dillon	
2017	Hailmakers	Sol	
2017	Timewasters	Horace / Aston	
2018	Sky Comedy Shorts	Maleek	
2017–2020	Famalam	Various	
2019	Urban Myths	Basil	
2019–2021	Sliced	Joshua	
2020	Truth Seekers	Elton John	
2020	Death to 2020	Pyrex Flask	Netflix special
2021–2022	Bloods	Maleek	
2021	Death to 2021	Pyrex Flask	Netflix special
2022–2023	Our Flag Means Death	Oluwande	
2024–2026	House of the Dragon	Mujja	4 episodes
2026	Zog	Zog	52 Episodes
