= Chinawhite (nightclub) =

Nightclub in central London, England

Coordinates: 51°30′37″N 0°8′11″W

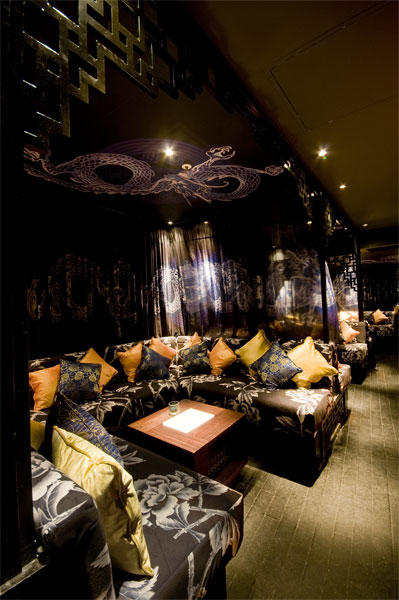
Nightclub interior after 2009 refurbishment

Chinawhite was a nightclub in central London. The original club was located in Air Street, between Piccadilly Circus and Soho, but the club closed in December 2008 due to the building being sold. It re-opened at a new location in London on 20 October 2009 at 4 Winsley Street, in Fitzrovia. In 2012 there was a partial re-brand and name change to "Libertine by Chinawhite". It is part of the wider Chinawhite group which owns and operates a selection of nightclubs, including in Manchester, Birmingham, and Newcastle.

== Original Soho club ==
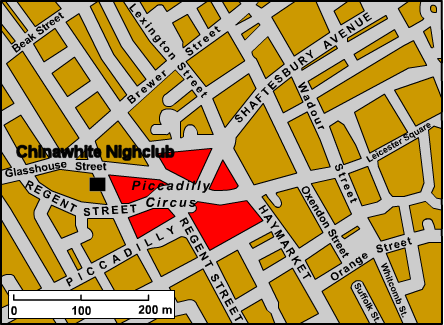
Map displaying approximate location near Piccadilly Circus of the original Chinawhite nightclub in central London

The original Chinawhite venue near Piccadilly Circus became a well known celebrity club; being attended by Premier League footballers, Page 3 girls, and young people in the entertainment industry. The Virgin Pocket Guide to London noted that it was "notoriously tough to get into" unless you were a member or celebrity, and another publication stated that "you may have to sell your organs to get into this celebrity pick-up joint with lightly trashy overtones". Kate Moss, Jemma Kidd, Leonardo DiCaprio, Mick Hucknall and Jude Law were names well connected with the club.

The original club in Soho had a number of "suites" with soft, bed-like lounging areas. including a "VIP suite" which gained notoriety in the British press over the years. The Unofficial Guide to London described the club as "highly artistic and colourful", and noted the "oriental styles and Chinese daybeds mixed with theatrical flair [and] unique lighting and cushions everywhere".

== Fitzrovia club ==
In 2009, Chinawhite undertook an extensive 16-week refurbishment project which was completed by Phelan Construction Ltd the same year. The new club in Fitzrovia sports a main room, a VIP room, an Asian inspired "Mao Room", and an upstairs bar called the Code. It continues to be a celebrity hotspot and one of the eminent brands in London nightlife.

== Belfast club ==
In September 2014, it was reported in Business and Leadership and the Belfast Telegraph that Chinawhite was to open a club in Belfast, and would employ 60 people at the new venue. The club is to locate in the city's Linen Quarter. This ceased trade in late 2018.

== Chinawhite Manchester ==
In November 2018 Chinawhite Manchester opened, located on 244 Deansgate. The design is styled to take inspiration from the original Chinawhite and features an opulent interior with Asian influences.

== Ownership ==
The nightclub is run by the Chinawhite Group. Firstfind Limited oversees the central office functions and grants licenses for locations to operate under the "Chinawhite" brand. The largest single shareholder is Elstrad Ltd, held in trust for Constantine Kulukundis. The Kulukundis family holds a reputable name within the international shipping industry. Following closely is Pareto Investments, owned by Fred Moss. The third major shareholder is So Ha Garment Co Ltd, with an unknown benefactor.
