= Monica Heisey =

Canadian writer, screen writer and comedian

- Born: Toronto, Canada
- Education: Queen's University at Kingston; King's College London
- Website: www.monicaheisey.com

Monica Heisey is a Canadian writer, screenwriter and comedian based in London. She has written for Schitt's Creek, the Baroness von Sketch Show and Workin' Moms, and created the Sky Comedy series Smothered. Her first novel Really Good, Actually was released in 2023.

== Early life and education ==
Heisey was born and raised in Toronto, Canada. She has a twin sister and a younger sister. Her father is a lawyer and mediator, and her mother was a public servant.

Heisey undertook undergraduate studies at Queen's University, Kingston, Ontario, graduating in 2010. Following graduation she moved to London, England where she obtained an MA in early modern literature from King's College London.

== Career ==
Heisey has written for numerous television shows including Schitt's Creek and Workin' Moms. Her first job screenwriting position was on the Baroness von Sketch Show, for which she is a four-time Canadian Screen Award winner.

Heisey's writing has appeared in Vogue, Elle, Glamour, and The New Yorker. Her first book I Can’t Believe It’s Not Better: A Woman’s Guide to Coping with Life, a collection of essays, was published in 2015. The book was based on her blog-based advice column She Does the City. She published her first fiction novel, Really Good, Actually, in 2023. It was inspired by her divorce at 28 years of age and the absence of that experience in popular culture. The book was written over the course of 2020 and has been optioned for a television series. The book was listed by The Times as the best popular fiction novel of 2023.

Heisey has been based in London, England since 2019.
