= Phil Davis (actor) =

British actor and narrator (born 1953)

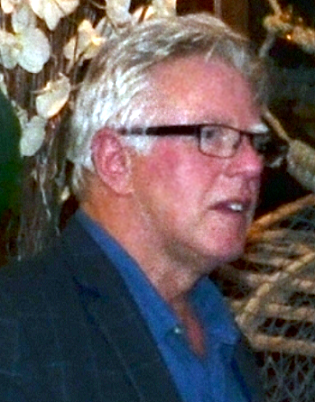
- Davis in 2016
- Born: Philip Davis; 30 July 1953 (age 73); Highgate, London, England
- Occupations: Actor; writer; director; narrator
- Spouse: Eve Matheson (m. 2002)
- Children: 2

Philip Davis (born 30 July 1953) is an English actor, writer, director and narrator. His early work as a director earned awards for Life’s a Gas (1992) and ID (1995). As an actor, he starred in Quadrophenia (1979), The Bounty (1984), High Hopes (1988), The Firm (1989), In the Name of the Father (1993), North Square (2000), White Teeth (2002), Vera Drake (2004), Bleak House (2005), Whitechapel (2009–2013), Sherlock (2010), Brighton Rock (2010), Merlin (2011), Silk (2012–2014), Poldark (2015–2016), Mad Dogs (2015–2016), Trying (2020–) and Platform 7 (2023).

== Early life ==
Davis was born on 30 July 1953 in Highgate, London, and brought up in South Ockendon in Thurrock, Essex. His father worked for Procter & Gamble in a soap factory and his mother was a hospital dining room supervisor. From the age of eight, he was interested in acting. After failing his eleven-plus, he attended Ockendon Courts County Secondary School in South Ockendon, Essex, where he was distracted in class, although he enjoyed school plays.

He was also a member of both the National Youth Theatre and Joan Littlewood's Theatre Workshop.

== Career ==
=== Acting ===
In 1977, he was cast in the lead role of the play Gotcha! about an under-achieving student who holds two teachers hostage on his last day at school. An early film role was as Chalky, a mod who is knocked off his scooter by a rocker in Quadrophenia (1979). He then landed the role of midshipman Edward "Ned" Young in The Bounty (1984); co-star Daniel Day-Lewis later rated him as one of his greatest inspirations. He appeared in the TV series To Have and to Hold with Amanda Redman. He began a long association with Mike Leigh with roles including Cyril the motorcycle courier in High Hopes in 1988.

In 1989, he starred opposite Gary Oldman in the BBC's football violence based film The Firm as 'Yeti', the rival gang leader to the protagonist.

In 2004, Davis played Stanley, the husband of the abortion care provider in Vera Drake (2004). He portrayed the mean money lender Smallweed in the BBC adaptation of Bleak House (2005), and as Jeff Hope, a cab driver in the first episode of Sherlock (2010).

From 2009 until 2013, Davis played a main role as DS Ray Miles in the ITV1 series Whitechapel, starring alongside Rupert Penry Jones and Steve Pemberton.

In 2012, he starred as crime family solicitor Micky Joy in Silk, then in 2015 as Jud, the malevolent servant in Poldark alongside Aidan Turner and Eleanor Tomlinson.

In 2017 he took over from Cherie Lunghi as the narrator of the BBC family history TV series Who Do You Think You Are?. Since 2020 he has also been the narrator of the BBC series Murder 24/7.

From November 2017 until February 2018, Davis played Ebenezer Scrooge in David Edgar's new adaptation of Charles Dickens' A Christmas Carol at the Royal Shakespeare Company.

In 2023, Davis played a main role in the ITV1 psychological thriller Platform 7, alongside actors Jasmine Jobson and Toby Regbo.

=== Recording ===
In 1980, Davis recorded "Blown It", which was released on the Elton John-owned label The Rocket Record Company.

== Personal life ==
Davis married actress Eve Matheson in Hackney, London in 2002. They have a daughter. Davis also has a son by a previous partner.

== Filmography ==
=== Film ===
Year	Title	Role	Notes
1972	The Canterbury Tales	2nd homosexual lover	Uncredited role
1975	Mister Quilp	Tom Scott	a.k.a. The Old Curiosity Shop (original title)
1979	Quadrophenia	Chalky	
1980	Dark Water	Eddie	Short film
1982	Pink Floyd – The Wall	Roadie	
1984	The Bounty	Midshipman Edward 'Ned' Young	
1985	The Doctor and the Devils	Billy Bedlam	
1985	Underworld	Lazarus	
1986	Comrades	Young (John) Standfield	
1988	High Hopes	Cyril	
1989	Howling V: The Rebirth	The Count	
1992	Alien 3	Kevin Dodd	
1992	Blue Ice	Westy	
1992	Life's a Gas	–	Short film. Director
1993	In the Name of the Father	Detective	
1994	Wanted	Randall	Short film
1995	I.D.	Duty Sergeant	Also director
1996	Different for Girls	Taxi Driver	
1996	Secrets & Lies	Man in Suit	
1996	Crimetime	Simon	
1997	Face	Julian	
1997	Photographing Fairies	Roy	
1998	Still Crazy	Limo Driver	
2002	Nicholas Nickleby	Brooker	
2004	The Baby Juice Express	Frank O'Reilly	
2004	Jack Brown and the Curse of the Crown	Inspector Kray	
2004	Vera Drake	Stan Drake	
2005	Casanova	Guardi	
2006	Notes on a Scandal	Brian Bangs	
2007	Diggers	Fred	Short film
2007	Cassandra's Dream	Martin Burns	
2008	A Fox's Tale	Jack (voice)	a.k.a. Kis Vuk (original Hungarian title)
2008	Bitter	Jack	Short film
2009	Dead Man Running	Johnny Sands	
2010	The Big I Am	Stubbs	
2010	Just for the Record	Ed Grains	
2010	Another Year	Jack	
2010	Brighton Rock	Spicer	
2010	The Rapture	Sir David	
2012	Outside Bet	Threads	
2012	Fast Girls	Brian	
2012	The Hot Potato	Sgt. Ryan	
2012	Borrowed Time	Philip	
2012	Roadkiller	Gavin	Short film
2013	Having You	Peter	
2014	Peterman	Grandad	
2015	Mr. Holmes	Inspector Gilbert	
2015	Dough	Sam Cotton	
2015	Age of Kill	Bill Weybridge	
2015	Midnight of My Life	–	Short film. Director
2016	Golden Years	Brian	
2016	Tale of a Timelord	The Oracle	Short films
2016	The Complete Walk: The Comedy of Errors	Egeon	Short films
2016	The Swing of It	Ray	Short films
2016	Zero Sum	Neumann	Short films
2017	Hampstead	Sid Fyfe	
2017	We Can Be Heroes	Grandad Evans	
2018	Juliet, Naked	Mayor Terry Barton	
2019	Brighton	Dave	
2020	Knuckledust	Happy	
2022	Deus	Vance	
2023	Rise of the Footsoldier: Vengeance	David Hexell	
2023	Keep	Gordon	Short film

=== Television ===
Year	Title	Role	Notes
1973	Orson Welles Great Mysteries	Johnny Sheeham	Episode: "In the Confessional"
1974	Death or Glory Boy	Tpr. Smiff	Episode: "Early Arrival"
1975	Centre Play	Steve	Episode: "Hanging On"
1976	Angels	Tom	Episode: "Legacies"
1977	Target	Ray	Episode: "Vandraggers"
1977–1980	Play for Today	Kid; Mr. Destry; Kevin; Post Office Clerk; 2nd Youth	5 episodes
1978	The Professionals	Billy Turner	Episode: "Old Dog with New Tricks"
1978	People Like Us	Berni Carver	Mini-series, 5 episodes
1978	Sexton Blake and the Demon God	Tinker	6 episodes
1979	S.O.S. Titanic	Crow's Nest Lookout	Television film. Uncredited role
1980	BBC2 Playhouse	Dick	Episode: "Grown-Ups"
1982	Oliver Twist	Noah Claypole	Television film
1983	Bergerac	Eric	Episode: "A Message for the Rich"
1983	Studio	Stew	7 episodes
1984	Crown Court	Joseph Guilfoyle	3 episodes: "Whisper Who Dares: Parts 1–3"
1984–1986	Robin of Sherwood	Prince John / King John	3 episodes
1985	Dramarama	Frog	Episode: "Frog"
1987	Truckers	Cowboy	7 episodes
1988	Rumpole of the Bailey	Tony Timson	Episode: "Rumpole and the Tap End"
1988	Screen Two	Finn	Episode: "Dead Lucky"
1989	Screen Two	Yeti	Episode: "The Firm"
1989	Skulduggery	–	Television film. Writer and director
1990	The Paradise Club	Walter Fagin	Episode: "Chinese Whispers"
1992	Inspector Morse	Roland Sherman / Harold Manners	Episode "Absolute Conviction"
1992	Nice Town	Paul Thompson	Mini-series, 3 episodes
1993	The Young Indiana Jones Chronicles	Interrogator	Episode: "Prague, August 1917"
1994–1995	Moving Story	Adrenalin	13 episodes. Also director of 2 episodes
1996	Prime Suspect 5: Errors of Judgment	–	Director
1996	Tales from the Crypt	Henry	Episode: "Ear Today... Gone Tomorrow"
1998	Real Women	–	Director
1999	Births, Marriages and Deaths	Graham	4 episodes
1999	Hold Back the Night	–	Director
2000	Black Cab	Nick	Episode: "Lost & Found"
2000	North Square	Peter McLeish	10 episodes
2001	Trance	Philip	Television film
2002	Fields of Gold	Roy Lodge	Television film
2002	White Teeth	Archie	Mini-series, 4 episodes
2002	The Safe House	Det. Inspector Baird	Television film
2002–2005	Rose and Maloney	Maloney	11 episodes
2003	Murder in Mind	Chaz Hadley	Episode: "Favours"
2003	Ready When You Are, Mr. McGill	Denis	Television film
2004	Wall of Silence	Tony Cottis	Television film
2005	Like Father Like Son	Paul Barker	Television film
2005	Twenty Thousand Streets Under the Sky	Ernest Eccles	Mini-series, 3 episodes
2005	Footprints in the Snow	Tim Perkins	Television film
2005	Bleak House	Smallweed	Mini-series, 10 episodes
2006	Agatha Christie's Marple	Dr. Kennedy	Episode: "Sleeping Murder"
2006	Beau Brummell: This Charming Man	Master Servant Robinson	Television film
2007	Five Days	Mic Danes	3 episodes
2007	Midsomer Murders	Gary Cooper	Episode: "The Axeman Cometh"
2007	Inspector George Gently	Joe Webster	Episode: "Gently Go Man"
2007	Secret Life	Rudi	Television film
2007	All About Me	Tony Conroy	Television film
2007	Cold Blood	DI Ted Radcliffe	Episode: "Interference"
2007	Comedy Showcase	Sergeant	Episode: "Other People"
2008	Lark Rise to Candleford	Ashlow	Episode: #1.4
2008	Bike Squad	CI Albert Custer	Television film
2008	Ashes to Ashes	Chas Cale	Episode: #1.6
2008	The Curse of Steptoe	Wilfrid Brambell	Television film
2008	Doctor Who	Lucius Petrus Dextrus	Episode "The Fires of Pompeii"
2008	Silent Witness	Derek Pargeter	2 episodes: "Death's Door: Parts 1 & 2"
2009	Desperate Romantics	Frank Stone	Mini-series, 4 episodes
2009	The Fixer	Roger Bowland	2 episodes
2009	Collision	Brian Edwards	Mini-series, 5 episodes
2009	Doctor Who: The Eighth Doctor Adventures	Titus (voice)	Episode: "The Cannibalists"
2009–2013	Whitechapel	DS Ray Miles	18 episodes
2010	Identity	David Sinclair	Episode: "Pariah"
2010	My Family	Carl	Episode: "Slammertime"
2010	Sherlock	Jeff Hope	2 episodes
2011	Case Histories	Theo Wyre	2 episodes
2011	First Cut	David De Gale	Episode: "Double Lesson"
2011	Merlin	The Gleeman	Episode: "The Wicked Day"
2012	Hacks	Ray	Television film
2012	Secrets and Words	Ray Collins	Episode: "Help Me If You Can"
2012	Vexed	Ron Poynter	Episode: #2.6
2012	The Town	Tony Nicholas	Mini-series, Episode: #1.1
2012–2014	Silk	Micky Joy	7 episodes
2013	Being Human	Captain Hatch	5 episodes
2013	Medics	Professor Barber	Television film
2014	This Is Jinsy	Roley Jenkins	Episode: "The Golden Woggle"
2014	Death in Paradise	Jim Chandler	Episode: "Rue Morgue"
2014	New Tricks	Gavin Gibson	Episode: "In Vino Veritas"
2015	Churchill: 100 Days That Saved Britain	Charles McMoran Wilson	Television film
2015	Black Work	DI Tom Piper	Mini-series, 2 episodes
2015–2016	Mad Dogs	Lawrence	10 episodes
2015–2016	Poldark	Jud Paynter	15 episodes
2016	Undercover	Jimmy	Mini-series, 2 episodes
2017	Riviera	Jukes	9 episodes
2017	Broken	Harry 'Aitch' Parkinson	Episode: "Father Michael"
2017	Comedy Playhouse	Gal	Episode: "Static"
2017–2025	Who Do You Think You Are?	Himself - Narrator (voice)	51 episodes
2018	The Reluctant Landlord	Dirty Harry	Episode: "Dirty Harry"
2019	Plebs	Serverus	Episode: "The Grumbrella"
2019	Dial M for Middlesbrough	Jed	Television film
2020	Silent Witness	Mick Ramsden	2 episodes: "Close to Home: Parts 1 & 2"
2020	Inside No. 9	Bill Ryland	Episode: "Thinking Out Loud"
2020–2024	Trying	Victor Ross	17 episodes
2021	Viewpoint	DI Liam Cox	Mini-series, 5 episodes
2021	Ragdoll	Mayor Ray Turnbull	Episode: #1.1
2022	Slow Horses	Dickie Bough	Episode: "Last Stop"
2023	Platform 7	Edward Warren	4 episodes
2024	Truelove	Nigel	Mini-series, 5 episodes
2025	The Gold	Joey Wilkins	

== Awards and nominations ==
Year	Award	Category	Work	Result	Ref.
As director
1992	Torino International Festival of Young Cinema	Prize of the City of Torino – Best Short Film	Life's a Gas	Nominated	
1995	Thessaloniki Film Festival	Golden Alexander Award	I.D.	Nominated	
1996	Valenciennes Int Fest of Action and Adventure Films	Audience Award (Director)	I.D.	Won	
As actor
2001	Broadcasting Press Guild Awards	Best Actor	North Square	Nominated	
2001	Royal Television Society Awards	Best Actor - Male	North Square	Nominated	
2004	British Independent Film Awards	Best Performance by an Actor in a British Independent Film	Vera Drake	Won	
2004	San Diego Film Critics Society Awards	Best Supporting Actor	Vera Drake	Won	
2005	British Academy Film Awards	Best Supporting Actor	Vera Drake	Nominated	
2005	Chlotrudis Awards	Best Supporting Actor	Vera Drake	Nominated	
2005	London Critics Circle Film Awards	Best British Supporting Actor	Vera Drake	Won	
2006	Online Film & Television Association	Best Supporting Actor in a Motion Picture or Miniseries	Bleak House	Nominated	
2009	Clarence Derwent Awards	Best Supporting Male (UK)	The Philistines	Won	
2012	Crime Thriller Awards	Dagger Award - Best Supporting Actor	Whitechapel and Silk	Nominated	
2012	Monte-Carlo TV Festival	Golden Nymph - Outstanding Actor in a Drama Series	Whitechapel	Nominated	
