= British Academy Television Award for Best Supporting Actress =

British television award

British Academy Television Award
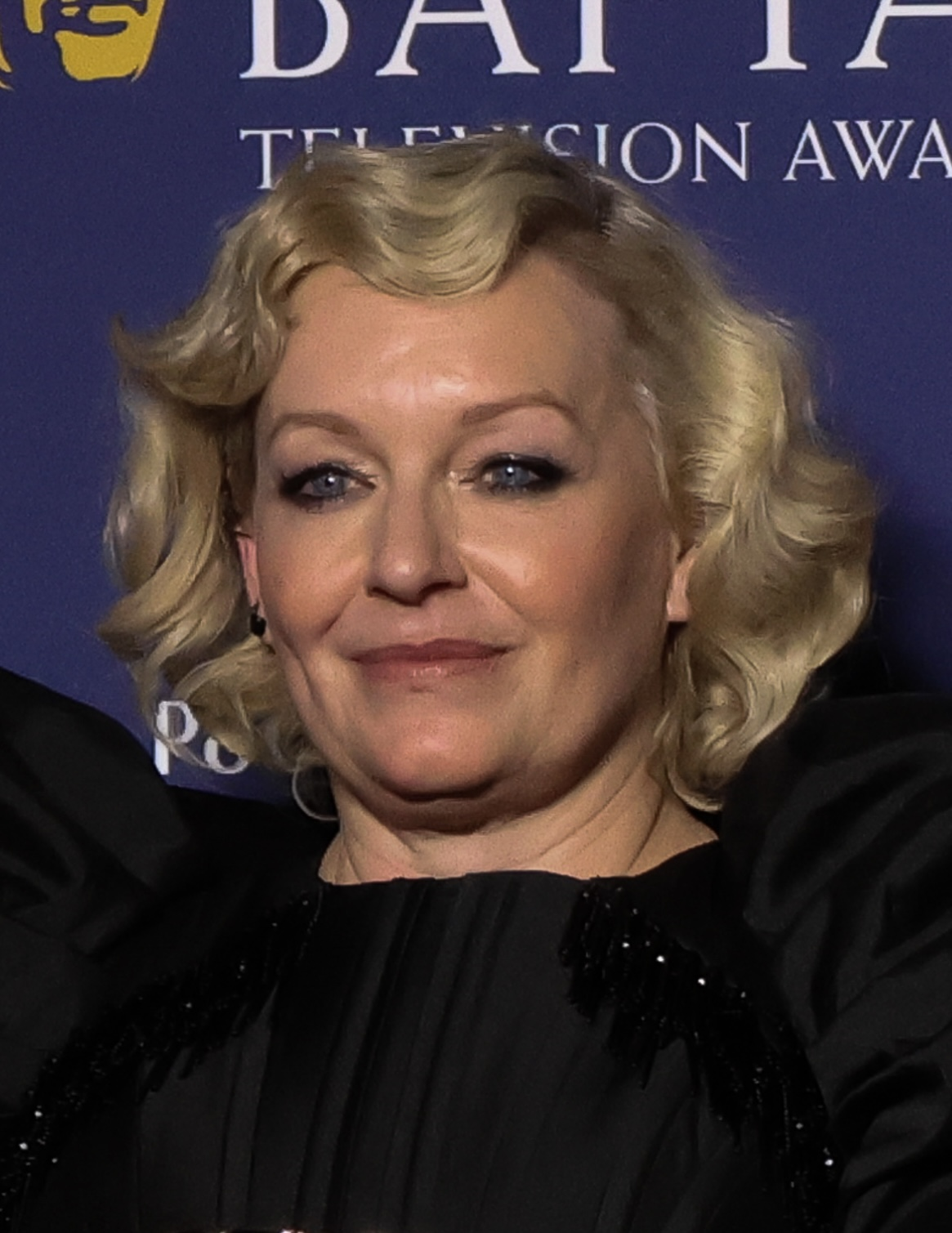
- 2026 winner: Christine Tremarco
- Country: United Kingdom
- Presented by: British Academy of Film and Television Arts
- First award: 2010
- Currently held by: Christine Tremarco for Adolescence (2026)
- Website: bafta.org

This is a list of the British Academy Television Award for Best Supporting Actress. The British Academy Television Awards (BAFTA TV Awards) were first presented in 1954. They are the UK equivalent to the Emmy Awards in the United States. From 1954 to 1997, film and television awards were presented at one ceremony. Since 1998, two separate ceremonies have been held.

The awards for Best Supporting Actress and Best Supporting Actor were first presented at the 2010 ceremony.

The first winner of this award was Rebecca Hall for her performance as Paula Garland in the Channel 4 limited series Red Riding 1974 (2010). The most recent winner was Jasmine Jobson for her role in the series Top Boy on Netflix.

Monica Dolan, Jasmine Jobson and Lesley Manville have the most nominations for this award, with three each.

== Winners and nominees ==
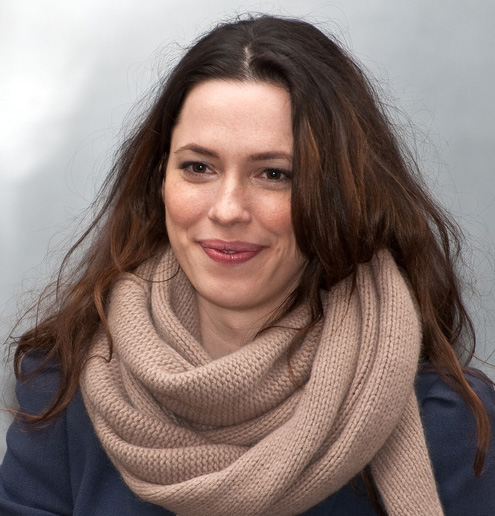
Rebecca Hall, the first recipient of this award for Red Riding (2010)

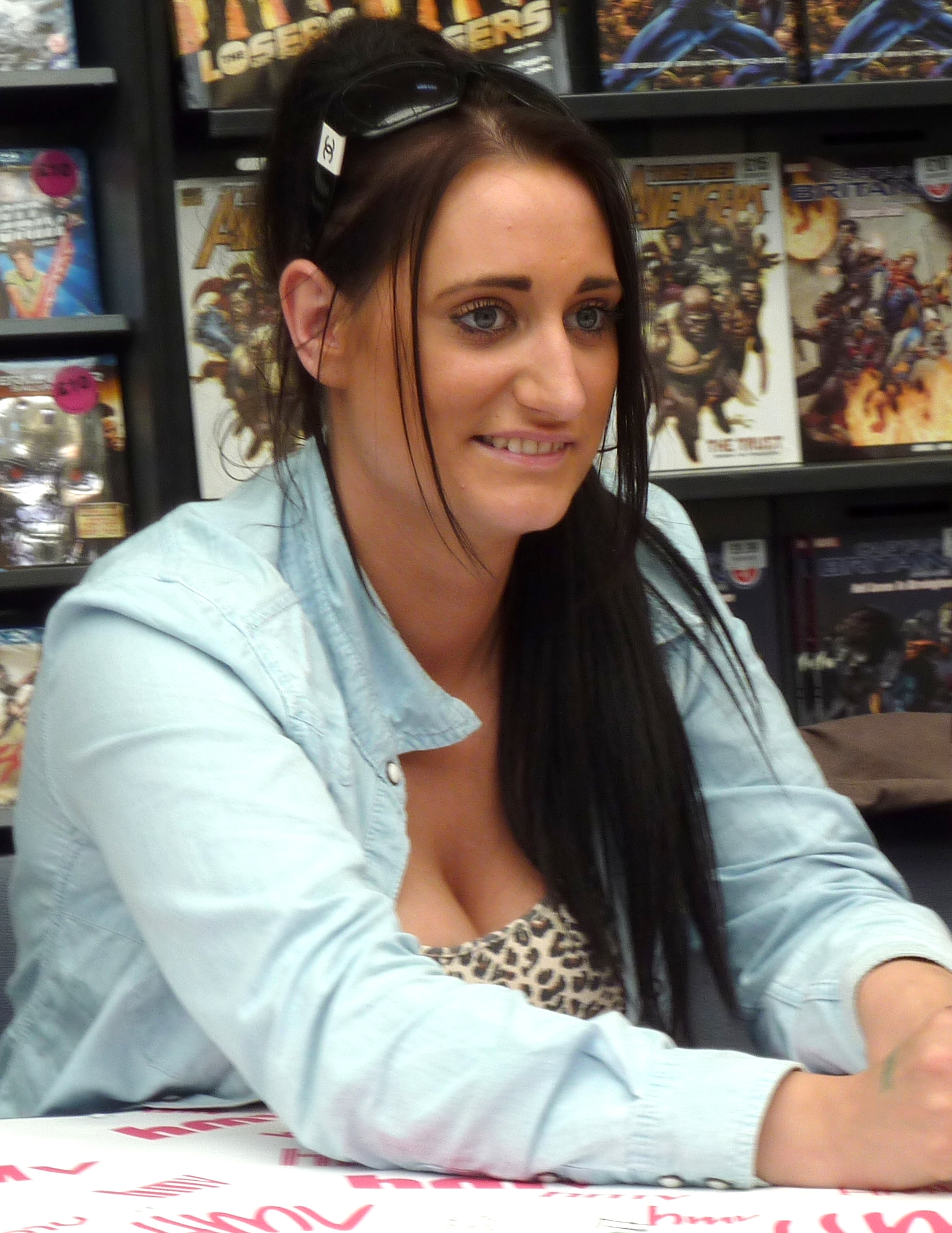
Lauren Socha won for Misfits in 2011.

Monica Dolan won for Appropriate Adult in 2012.

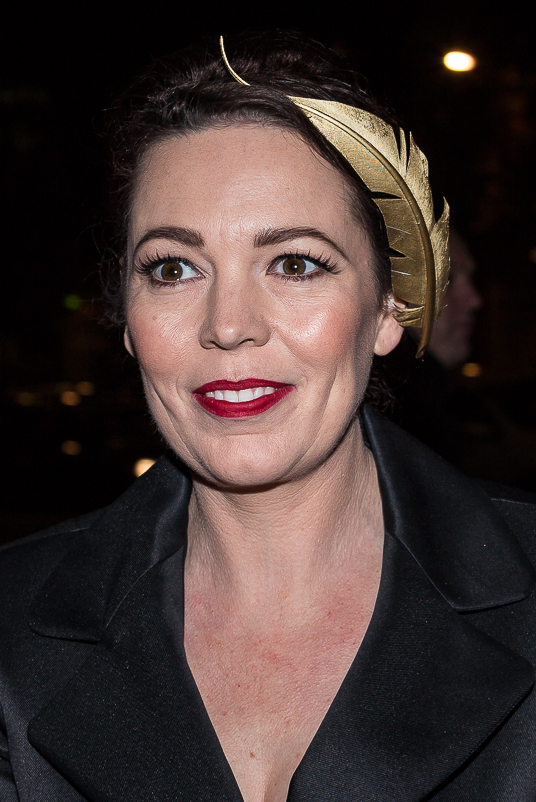
Olivia Colman won for Accused in 2013.

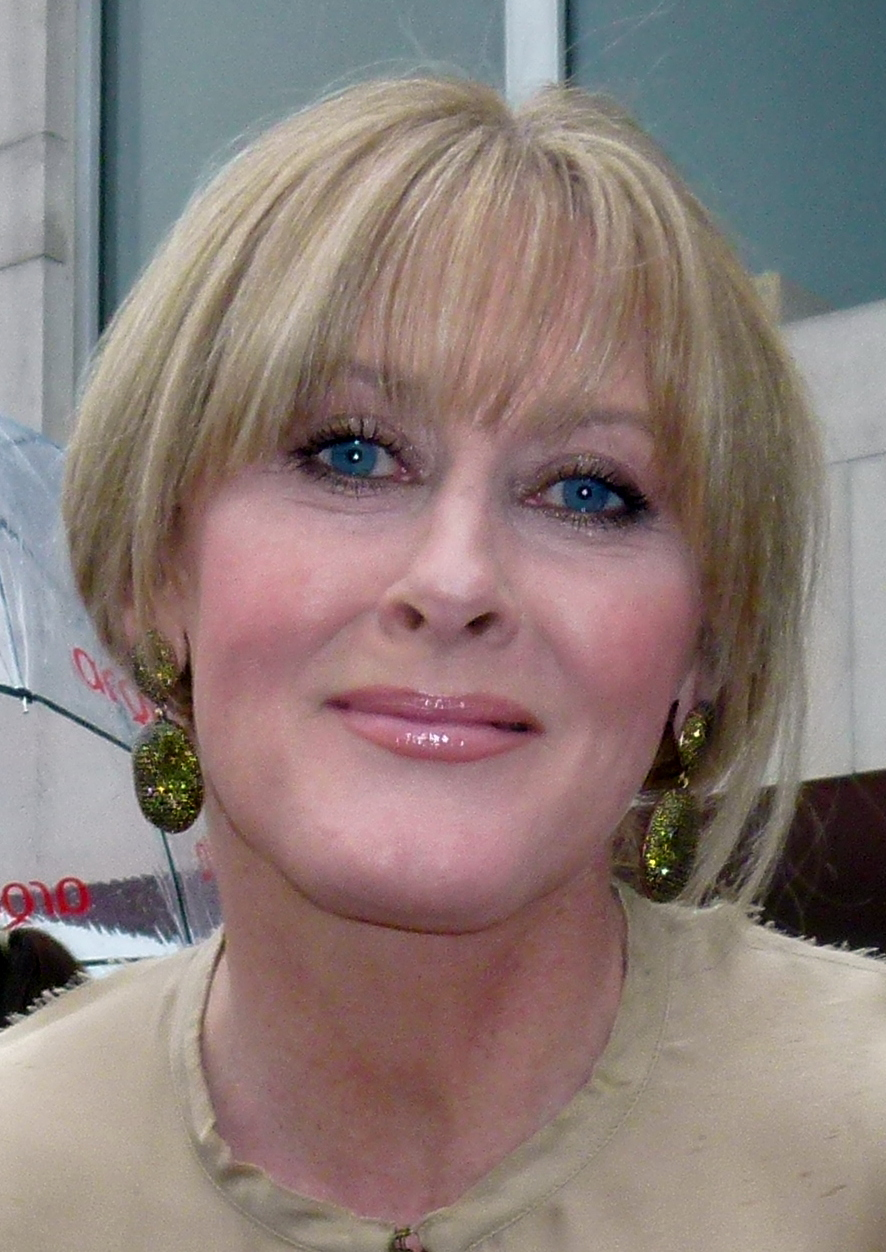
Sarah Lancashire won for Last Tango in Halifax in 2014.

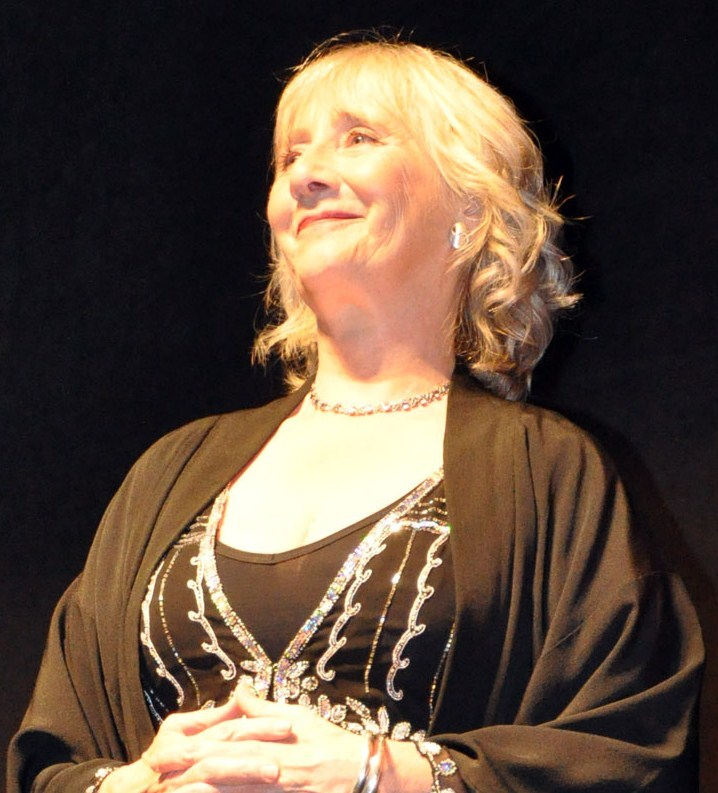
Gemma Jones won for Marvellous in 2015.

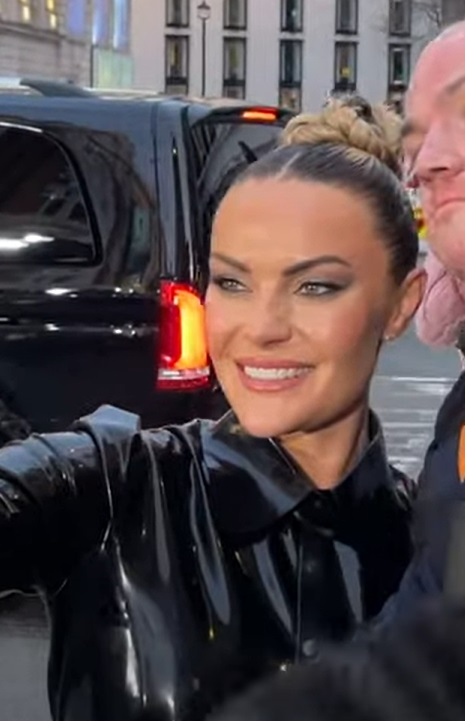
Chanel Cresswell won for This Is England '90 in 2016.

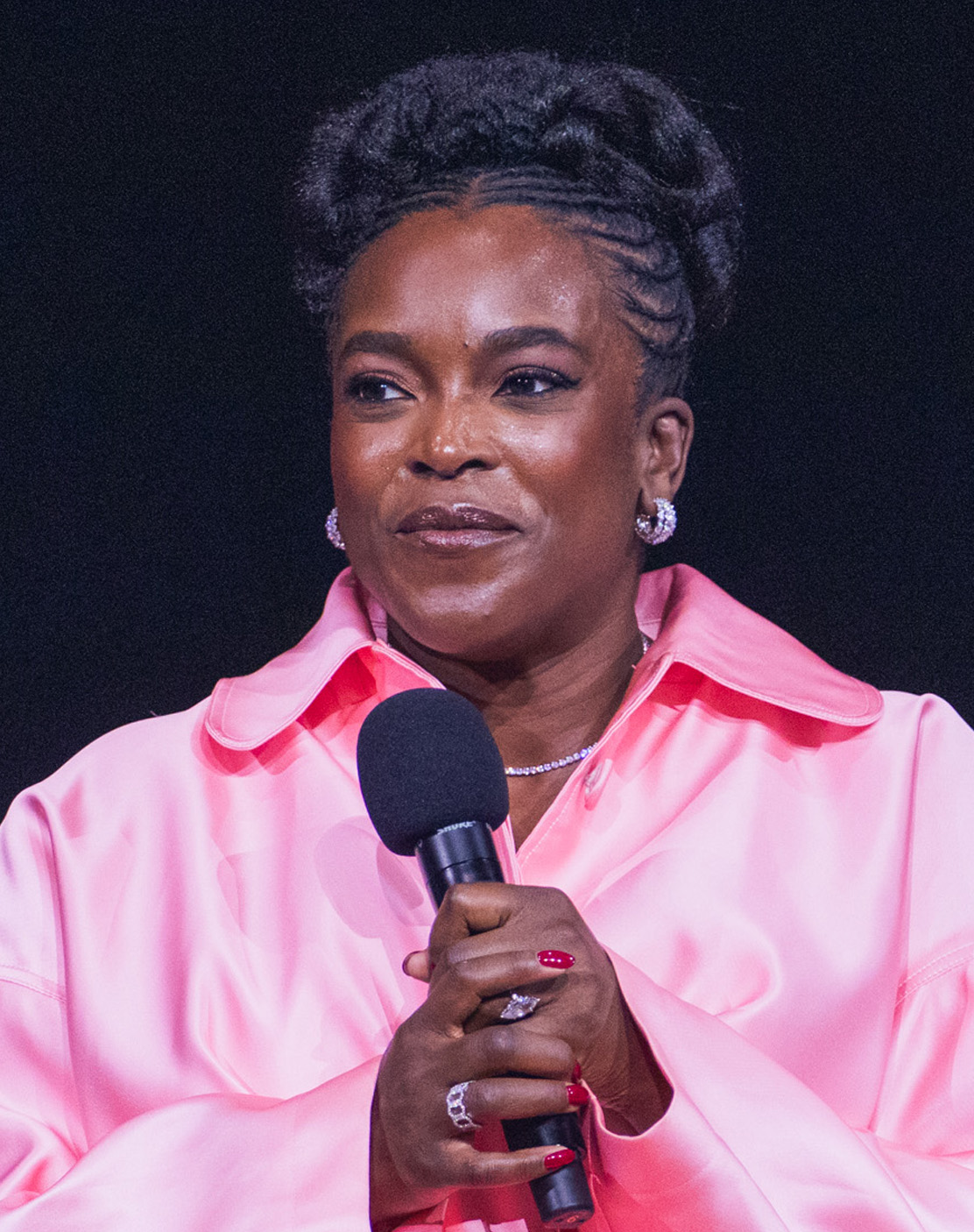
Wunmi Mosaku won for Damilola, Our Loved Boy in 2017.

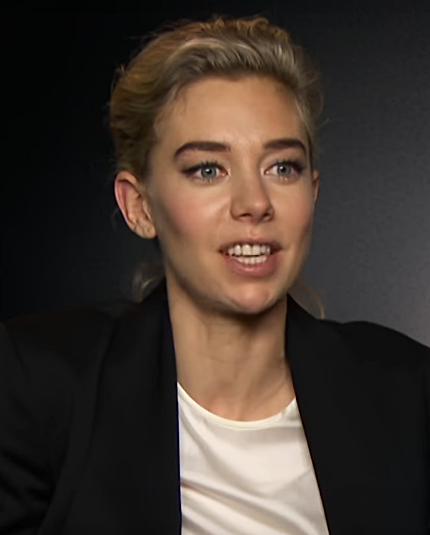
Vanessa Kirby won for The Crown in 2018.

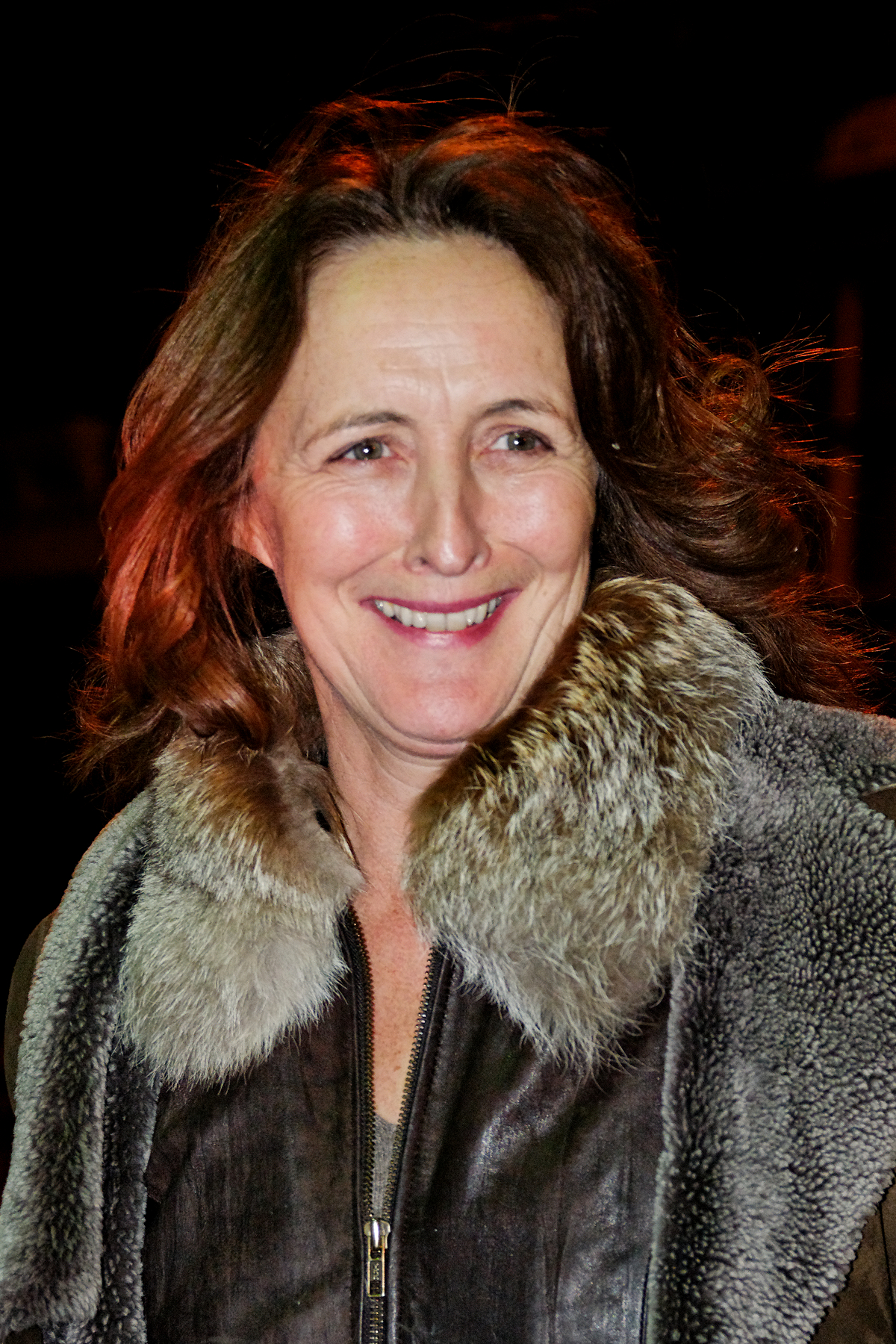
Fiona Shaw won for Killing Eve in 2019.

Naomi Ackie won for The End of the F***ing World in 2020.

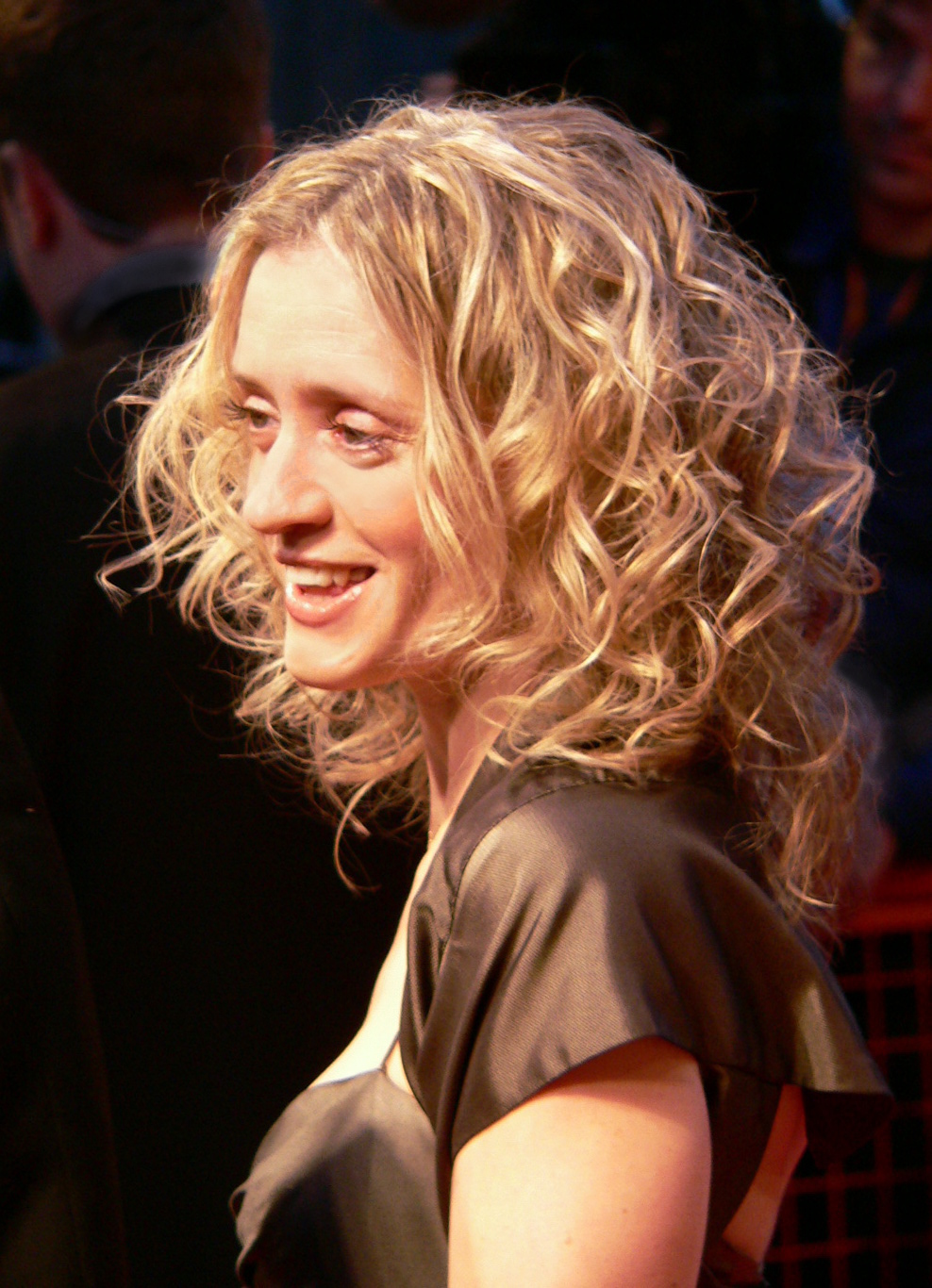
Anne-Marie Duff won for Bad Sisters in 2023.

Jasmine Jobson won for Top Boy in 2024.

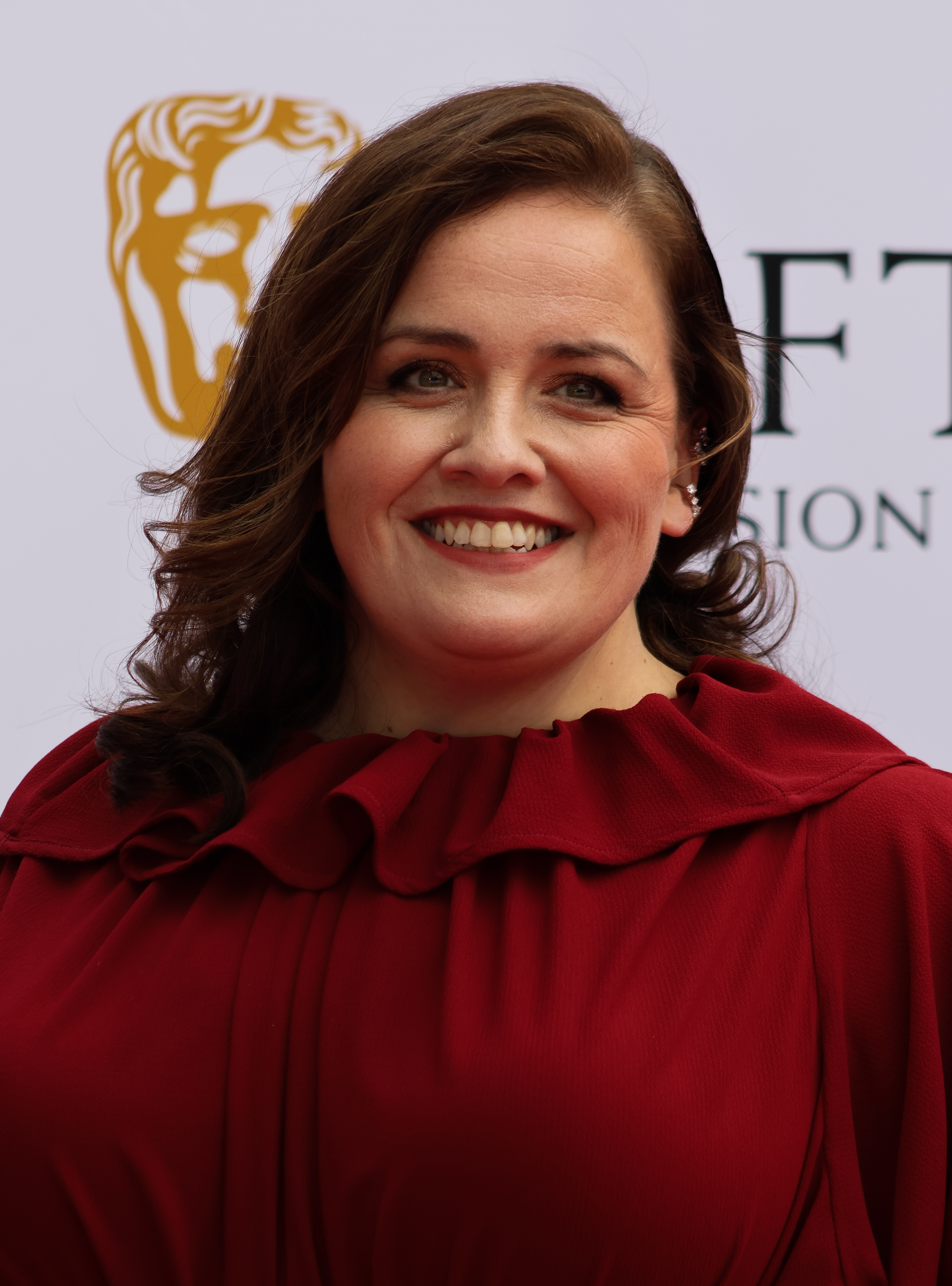
Jessica Gunning won for Baby Reindeer in 2025.

=== 2010s ===
Year	Actress	Work	Character	Network
2010 (56th)
2010 (56th)	Rebecca Hall	Red Riding 1974	Paula Garland	Channel 4
2010 (56th)	Sophie Okonedo	Criminal Justice	Jackie Woolf	BBC One
2010 (56th)	Imelda Staunton	Return to Cranford	Octavia Pole	BBC One
2010 (56th)	Lauren Socha	The Unloved	Lauren	Channel 4
2011 (57th)
2011 (57th)	Lauren Socha	Misfits	Kelly Bailey	E4
2011 (57th)	Gillian Anderson	Any Human Heart	Wallis Simpson	Channel 4
2011 (57th)	Lynda Baron	The Road to Coronation Street	Violet Carson	BBC Four
2011 (57th)	Jessie Wallace	The Road to Coronation Street	Pat Phoenix	BBC Four
2012 (58th)
2012 (58th)	Monica Dolan	Appropriate Adult	Rose West	ITV
2012 (58th)	Anna Chancellor	The Hour	Lix Storm	BBC Two
2012 (58th)	Miranda Hart	Call the Midwife	Camilla "Chummy" Noakes	BBC One
2012 (58th)	Maggie Smith	Downton Abbey	Violet Crawley	ITV
2013 (59th)
2013 (59th)	Olivia Colman	Accused: "Mo's Story"	Sue Brown	BBC One
2013 (59th)	Anastasia Hille	The Fear	Jo Beckett	Channel 4
2013 (59th)	Sarah Lancashire	Last Tango in Halifax	Caroline Dawson	BBC One
2013 (59th)	Imelda Staunton	The Girl	Alma Reville	BBC Two
2014 (60th)
2014 (60th)	Sarah Lancashire	Last Tango in Halifax	Caroline Dawson	BBC One
2014 (60th)	Shirley Henderson	Southcliffe	Claire Salter	Channel 4
2014 (60th)	Claire Rushbrook	My Mad Fat Diary	Linda Earl-Bouchtat	E4
2014 (60th)	Nicola Walker	Last Tango in Halifax	Gillian Buttershaw	BBC One
2015 (61st)
2015 (61st)	Gemma Jones	Marvellous	Mary Baldwin	BBC Two
2015 (61st)	Amanda Redman	Tommy Cooper: Not Like That, Like This	Gwen Cooper	ITV
2015 (61st)	Vicky McClure	Line of Duty	Kate Fleming	BBC Two
2015 (61st)	Charlotte Spencer	Glue	Tina Fallon	E4
2016 (62nd)
2016 (62nd)	Chanel Cresswell	This Is England '90	Kelly Jenkins	Channel 4
2016 (62nd)	Michelle Gomez	Doctor Who	Missy / The Master	BBC One
2016 (62nd)	Lesley Manville	River	Chrissie Read	BBC One
2016 (62nd)	Eleanor Worthington Cox	The Enfield Haunting	Janet Hodgson	Sky Living
2017 (63rd)
2017 (63rd)	Wunmi Mosaku	Damilola, Our Loved Boy	Gloria Taylor	BBC One
2017 (63rd)	Vanessa Kirby	The Crown	Princess Margaret	Netflix
2017 (63rd)	Siobhan Finneran	Happy Valley	Clare Cartwright	BBC One
2017 (63rd)	Nicola Walker	Last Tango in Halifax	Gillian Buttershaw	BBC One
2018 (64th)
2018 (64th)	Vanessa Kirby	The Crown	Princess Margaret	Netflix
2018 (64th)	Anna Friel	Broken	Christina Fitzsimmons	BBC One
2018 (64th)	Liv Hill	Three Girls	Ruby Bowen	BBC One
2018 (64th)	Julie Hesmondhalgh	Broadchurch	Trish Winterman	ITV
2019 (65th)
2019 (65th)	Fiona Shaw	Killing Eve	Carolyn Martens	BBC One
2019 (65th)	Monica Dolan	A Very English Scandal	Marion Thorpe	BBC One
2019 (65th)	Keeley Hawes	Mrs. Wilson	Dorothy Wick	BBC One
2019 (65th)	Billie Piper	Collateral	Karen Mars	BBC One

=== 2020s ===
Year	Actress	Work	Character	Network
2020 (66th)
2020 (66th)	Naomi Ackie	The End of the F***ing World	Bonnie	Channel 4
2020 (66th)	Helena Bonham Carter	The Crown	Princess Margaret	Netflix
2020 (66th)	Jasmine Jobson	Top Boy	Jacqueline "Jaq" Lawrence	Netflix
2020 (66th)	Helen Behan	The Virtues	Anna Lowery	Channel 4
2021 (67th)
2021 (67th)	Rakie Ayola	Anthony	Gee Walker	BBC One
2021 (67th)	Helena Bonham Carter	The Crown	Princess Margaret	Netflix
2021 (67th)	Sophie Okonedo	Criminal: UK	Julia Bryce	Netflix
2021 (67th)	Leila Farzad	I Hate Suzie	Naomi Jones	Sky Atlantic
2021 (67th)	Siena Kelly	Adult Material	Amy Lloyd	Channel 4
2021 (67th)	Weruche Opia	I May Destroy You	Terry Pratchard	BBC One / HBO Max
2022 (68th)
2022 (68th)	Cathy Tyson	Help	Poly	Channel 4
2022 (68th)	Jessica Plummer	The Girl Before	Emma Matthews	BBC One
2022 (68th)	Emily Mortimer	The Pursuit of Love	The Bolter	BBC One
2022 (68th)	Céline Buckens	Showtrial	Talitha Campbell	BBC One
2022 (68th)	Leah Harvey	Foundation	Salvor Hardin	Apple TV+
2022 (68th)	Tahirah Sharif	The Tower	Lizzie Adama	ITV
2023 (69th)
2023 (69th)	Anne-Marie Duff	Bad Sisters	Grace Williams	Apple TV+
2023 (69th)	Adelayo Adedayo	The Responder	Rachel Hargreaves	BBC One
2023 (69th)	Lesley Manville	Sherwood	Julie Jackson	BBC One
2023 (69th)	Saffron Hocking	Top Boy	Lauryn Lawrence	Netflix
2023 (69th)	Jasmine Jobson	Top Boy	Jacqueline "Jaq" Lawrence	Netflix
2023 (69th)	Fiona Shaw	Andor	Maarva Andor	Disney+
2024 (70th)
2024 (70th)	Jasmine Jobson	Top Boy	Jacqueline "Jaq" Lawrence	Netflix
2024 (70th)	Elizabeth Debicki	The Crown	Diana, Princess of Wales	Netflix
2024 (70th)	Harriet Walter	Succession	Lady Caroline Collingwood	Sky Atlantic
2024 (70th)	Lesley Manville	The Crown	Princess Margaret	Netflix
2024 (70th)	Nico Parker	The Last of Us	Sarah Miller	Sky Atlantic
2024 (70th)	Siobhan Finneran	Happy Valley	Clare Cartwright	BBC One
2025 (71st)
2025 (71st)	Jessica Gunning	Baby Reindeer	Martha Scott	Netflix
2025 (71st)	Nava Mau	Baby Reindeer	Teresa "Teri"	Netflix
2025 (71st)	Katherine Parkinson	Rivals	Lizzie Vereker	Disney+
2025 (71st)	Maxine Peake	Say Nothing	Older Dolours Price	Disney+
2025 (71st)	Monica Dolan	Sherwood	Ann Branson	BBC One
2025 (71st)	Sue Johnston	Truelove	Marion	Channel 4
2026 (72nd)
2026 (72nd)	Christine Tremarco	Adolescence	Manda Miller	Netflix
2026 (72nd)	Rose Ayling-Ellis	Reunion	Miri	BBC One
2026 (72nd)	Erin Doherty	Adolescence	Briony Ariston	Netflix
2026 (72nd)	Emilia Jones	Task	Maeve Prendergrast	Sky Atlantic
2026 (72nd)	Chyna McQueen	Get Millie Black	Hibiscus	Channel 4
2026 (72nd)	Aimee Lou Wood	The White Lotus	Chelsea	Sky Atlantic

== Superlatives ==
Record	Actress	Programme	Age (in years)
Oldest winner	Gemma Jones	Marvellous	72
Oldest nominee	Maggie Smith	Downton Abbey	77
Youngest winner	Lauren Socha	Misfits	20
Youngest nominee	Eleanor Worthington Cox	The Enfield Haunting	14

== Actresses with multiple wins and nominations ==
=== Multiple nominations ===
The following people have been nominated for the British Academy Television Award for Best Supporting Actress multiple times:

3 nominations

- Monica Dolan
- Jasmine Jobson
- Lesley Manville

2 nominations

- Helena Bonham Carter
- Siobhan Finneran
- Vanessa Kirby
- Sarah Lancashire
- Sophie Okonedo
- Fiona Shaw
- Lauren Socha
- Imelda Staunton
- Nicola Walker

== Programmes with multiple wins and nominations ==
=== Multiple nominations ===
6 nominations

- The Crown

4 nominations

- Last Tango in Halifax
- Top Boy

2 nominations

- Adolescence
- Baby Reindeer
- Happy Valley
- The Road to Coronation Street
- Sherwood
