= Jasmine Jobson =

British actress (born 1995)

- Jobson at the 2026 BFI London Film Festival
- Born: 9 May 1995 (age 31); Hayes, London, England
- Occupation: Actress
- Years active: 2013–present

Jasmine Jobson (born 9 May 1995) is a British actress. For her performance in the Netflix crime drama Top Boy (2019–2023), she won a British Academy Television Award. She has since starred in the ITVX series Platform 7 (2023) and the Paramount+ series MobLand (2025). Her films include Surge (2020).

== Early life ==
Jasmine Jobson was born 9 May 1995 in Hayes, West London, England. Her mother is of Irish and Greek-Cypriot heritage; her father is Jamaican. From a very young age (around six), Jobson showed talent singing by mimicking television stars, so her mother enrolled her in "Paddington Arts" (a Youth Arts organisation dedicated to developing talent and creativity in London's young people), where Jobson honed her talents.

As a child, Jobson had asked to be separated from her mother by social services and placed into foster care, living in West Drayton for five years. Jobson taught herself how to channel her emotions into her acting. When asked by the casting director for Top Boy to show some anger in her audition, Jobson threw a chair across the room, nearly hitting a window, securing her the role in the production.

After completing her GCSEs, she joined the Big House Theatre, which provides drama-based workshops and training on building teams, managing challenges, and developing confidence. The theatre focuses on helping young people who have been through the UK's care system. Maggie Norris, chief executive of Big House, described Jobson as an extraordinary talent.

== Career ==
Jobson began her acting career in theatre, performing in plays such as Phoenix: A Girl on Fire and Wild Diamonds at the Hackney Down Studios in 2013. From 2014, Jobson performed in several short films Flea, A Generation of Vipers and The King, before debuting on television in 2016 as Kia Hopkins in an episode of Suspects. Since then, she has made minor appearances in The Break, Five by Five and Dark Heart, before landing a main character role in the Channel 4 (later Netflix) television crime drama series Top Boy. In 2019, Jobson was nominated for and won the Best Emerging Talent at the Movie and Video Awards (MVISA).

In 2020, Jobson starred as Lily in feature film Surge, which premiered in January 2020 at the Sundance Film Festival in Salt Lake City. Jobson purported to be comfortable in an airport environment, the setting for Surge, as she once worked as a bartender in Wetherspoons at Heathrow's Terminal 2. Between 2020 and 2024, Jobson was nominated three times for the British Academy Television Award for Best Supporting Actress for her role in Top Boy, winning in 2024.

In 2023, Jobson took the protagonist role in the ITV1 psychological thriller Platform 7, alongside actors Phil Davis and Toby Regbo. Also in 2023, Jobson voiced a talking baby in an advert for Prostate Cancer UK.

In 2025, she stars as Zosia, working for the shows protagonist criminals 'the Harrigans', led by Pierce Brosnan's Conrad Harrigan in the Paramount+ London gangster series MobLand (2025), directed by Guy Ritchie;

== Filmography ==
=== Film ===
Year	Title	Role	Notes
2014	A Generation of Vipers	Mae	Short film
2014	Flea	Naz	Short film
2016	The King	Tanisha	Short film
2018	Collection Only	Aliyah	Short film
2018	Carly	Helen	Short film
2018	Obey	Little M	
2018	Little Shit	Jasmine	Short film
2019	Lie Low	Michelle	
2020	Good Thanks, You?	Amy	
2020	Surge	Lily	
2020	Clearing	Kaila	Short film
2024	Bird	Peyton	
2025	Hamlet	Fortinbras	
TBA	In the Shadows	Ramla Ali	In production

=== Television ===
Year	Title	Role	Notes
2016	The Break	Lisa	Episode: "Match Girl"
2016	Suspects	Kia Hopkins	Episode: "The Enemy Within: Part 3"
2017	Five by Five	Jigga	2 episodes
2018	Dark Heart	Sally Watkins	Episode: "Suffer the Children: Part 1"
2019–2023	Top Boy	Jaq	24 episodes
2022	Noughts + Crosses	Cara Imega	Episode: "#2.1"
2023	Platform 7	Lisa Evans	Main role; 4 episodes
2025–present	MobLand	Zosia	Main role; 9 episodes

== Awards and nominations ==
Year	Award	Category	Work	Result	Ref.
2019	Movie & Video Screen Awards (MVISA)	Best Emerging Talent	Outstanding Career contribution	Won	
2020	British Academy Television Awards	BAFTA TV Award for Best Supporting Actress	Top Boy	Nominated	
2022	MOBO Awards	Best Performance In a TV Show/Film	Top Boy	Nominated	
2023	British Academy Television Awards	BAFTA TV Award for Best Supporting Actress	Top Boy	Nominated	
2023	9th National Film Awards UK	Best Actress in a TV Series	Top Boy	Nominated	
2024	British Academy Television Awards	BAFTA TV Award for Best Supporting Actress	Top Boy	Won	
2024	Royal Television Society Programme Awards	Leading Actor: Female	Top Boy	Nominated	
