= The Keeping Room =

2014 film by Daniel Barber

- Theatrical release poster
- Directed by: Daniel Barber
- Written by: Julia Hart
- Produced by: Jordan Horowitz; David McFadzean; Dete Meserve; Patrick Newall; Judd Payne
- Starring: Brit Marling; Hailee Steinfeld; Muna Otaru; Sam Worthington
- Cinematography: Martin Ruhe
- Edited by: Álex Rodríguez
- Music by: Martin Phipps
- Production companies: Summit Entertainment; Wind Dancer Films; Gilbert Films; Anonymous Content
- Distributed by: Drafthouse Films; Lionsgate Films
- Release dates: September 2014 (TIFF); September 25, 2015 (United States)
- Running time: 95 minutes
- Country: United States
- Language: English
- Box office: $31,168

The Keeping Room is a 2014 American Western film directed by Daniel Barber and written by Julia Hart. The film stars Brit Marling, Hailee Steinfeld, Muna Otaru, Sam Worthington, Amy Nuttall, and Ned Dennehy. It was screened in the Special Presentations section of the 2014 Toronto International Film Festival. The film was given a limited release in the United States on September 25, 2015, by Drafthouse Films. The film was made available on Netflix US on May 4, 2016.

== Plot ==
Left without men in the dying days of the American Civil War, three Southern women – two white sisters, Augusta and Louise, and an African-American slave, Mad – must fight to defend their home and themselves from two rogue soldiers who have broken off from the fast-approaching Union Army. Augusta, the elder sister, goes in search of medicine for Louise, who has been bitten by a raccoon. She first goes to a neighbor's house but finds the neighbor dead, having drunk a bottle of poison. She then goes to a bar, where she is told to leave by the barman. It is there that Augusta encounters the two Union soldiers, Moses and Henry.

Late the next night, Augusta hears noises from outside. It is Moses and Henry, and an intense shootout ensues. Henry rapes Louise and is about to shoot her when Mad shoots him dead; while outside, Augusta shoots Moses, but does not kill him. The three women go into the kitchen and Mad reveals how she was raped often as a child.

Hearing a clatter outside, Augusta and Mad investigate with guns; Mad aims to shoot down a figure in the dark until she sees it is her lover, Bill, returned from the war. Just then Augusta, mistaking him for Moses, fatally wounds him. Before dying, he tells Mad "it's over" and "they're coming." In the morning, Augusta realizes that Moses is still alive and they search the house. When they eventually find him, he tells Augusta he is a "bummer" (soldiers sent in advance to forage for food and find any deserters or survivors) for the army. Seriously wounded, Moses warns Augusta that "Uncle Billy's coming, burning down everything in his path. Rest assured, it will be cruel." Augusta shoots him dead. The women bury the bodies and, after seeing flames along the horizon, debate whether to stay and defend their house or leave. They decide to dress as men, using the dead soldiers' clothing. They set the house on fire and the film ends on the women walking down the road, just as scattered Union troops are reaching their house.

== Cast ==
- Brit Marling as Augusta
- Hailee Steinfeld as Louise
- Muna Otaru as Mad
- Sam Worthington as Moses
- Kyle Soller as Henry
- Ned Dennehy as Caleb
- Amy Nuttall as Moll
- Nicholas Pinnock as Bill

== Production ==
The film was first announced in October 2012. Hart's script was inspired by her learning that her friends had two skeletons dating from the Civil War in their backyards and wondering how they got there. Initially the film was to star Olivia Wilde; she later left and was replaced by Brit Marling. Sam Worthington rounded out the cast in April 2013.

=== Filming ===
Principal photography began in June 2013 in Bucharest, Romania, and ended on July 18, 2013.

== Reception ==
The Keeping Room received mixed to positive reviews. As of June 2020, the film holds a 75% approval rating on Rotten Tomatoes, based on 83 reviews with an average rating of 6.45/10. The website's critics consensus states: "Aided by its sparse setting and committed performances, The Keeping Room is just fascinatingly off-kilter enough to overcome its frustrating stumbles." On Metacritic, it has a score of 58 out of 100, based on 21 critics' reviews, indicating "mixed or average reviews".

== See also ==
- List of films featuring slavery
