= Saffron Hocking =

British actress (born 1994)

- Born: Saffron Olivia Hocking; 5 January 1992 (age 34); Greenwich, Greater London, England
- Education: Academy of Live and Recorded Arts
- Years active: 2014–present

Saffron Olivia Hocking (born 5 January 1994) is a British actress. She is known for her roles in the BBC series White Gold (2017) and the Netflix series Top Boy (2019–2023), the latter of which earned her a British Academy Television Award nomination.

== Early life ==
Hocking is from Greenwich, South East London. She is of Nigerian descent through her mother. She graduated from the Academy of Live and Recorded Arts (ALRA) in 2014.

== Career ==
Upon graduating from ALRA, Hocking was cast in Richard Bean's 2014 play Pitcairn, which had its world premiere at the Minerva Theatre, Chichester before having a run at Shakespeare's Globe and going on tour with Out of Joint. The following year, Hocking made her television debut with guest appearances in the BBC One series Doctors and Partners in Crime.

Hocking played Lima in the 2016 Irish miniseries Smalltown and had a recurring role as Emma Lyndsey in the first series of the BBC Two sitcom White Gold in 2017. She also had a small role in the Acorn TV police procedural London Kills.

In 2019, Hocking joined the cast of Top Boy for its series 3 revival on Netflix in the recurring role of Lauryn Lawrence. She was promoted to the main cast for Top Boy's fourth series, and subsequently earned a nomination for the British Academy Television Award for Best Supporting Actress for her performance. In 2022, Hocking starred in the music video for Stormzy's "Hide & Seek" and appeared in the ITVX drama Riches and the first episode of the Disney+ series Moon Knight. Hocking has an upcoming role in the second series of the Amazon Prime thriller The Devil's Hour.

== Personal life ==
Hocking is an ambassador for Refuge, having reached out to the charity when seeking to portray her Top Boy character's domestic abuse storyline.

== Filmography ==
=== Film ===
Year	Title	Role	Notes
2018	Strangeways Here We Come	Sian	
2025	Fuze	Military Sergeant Dootsie Keane	
2025	Hedda	Jane Ji	

=== Television ===
Year	Title	Role	Notes
2013	Top Boy	Lauryn (uncredited)	Episode #2.1
2015	Doctors	Emily Cruz	Episode: "Slipping Through the Cracks"
2015	Partners in Crime	Teller	Miniseries; episode: "N or M? Part 1"
2016	Smalltown	Lima	Miniseries; 3 episodes
2016	All About the McKenzies	Annika	Episode: "Karma"
2017	White Gold	Emma Lyndsey	4 episodes (Series 1)
2019	London Kills	Eleanor Kemp	2 episodes
2019–2023	Top Boy	Lauryn Lawrence	Recurring role (series 3); main cast (series 4–5)
2022	Moon Knight	Dylan	Miniseries; episode: "The Goldfish Problem"
2022	Riches	Sasha Bailey	5 episodes
2024	Peacock	Kara	5 episodes
2024	The Devil's Hour	Sam Boyd	Main cast (series 2)
2026	Hit Point	Bella	Lead role

== Awards and nominations ==
Year	Award	Category	Work	Result	Ref.
2023	Royal Television Society Programme Awards	Actress – Female	Top Boy	Nominated	
2023	British Academy Television Awards	Best Supporting Actress	Top Boy	Nominated	
