= Top Boy =

British television crime drama series

- Genre: Crime drama Thriller
- Created by: Ronan Bennett
- Starring: Ashley Walters; Kane Robinson
- Opening theme: "Finished I Ain't" by Ghostpoet (Series 1)
- Ending theme: "Cold Win" by Ghostpoet (Series 2)
- Composers: Brian Eno; Michael Asante
- Country of origin: United Kingdom
- Original language: English
- No. of series: 5
- No. of episodes: 32

Production
- Executive producers: Aubrey Graham; Adel Nur; Maverick Carter; Jamal Henderson; Ronan Bennett; Charles Steel; Alasdair Flind; Yann Demange; Ashley Walters; Kane Robinson
- Producers: Laura Hastings-Smith; Yvonne Isimeme Ibazebo; Alasdair Flind
- Cinematography: Tat Radcliffe; Christopher Ross
- Editors: Chris Wyatt; Matthew Tabern
- Running time: 48 minutes (approx.)
- Production companies: Cowboy Films; Easter Partisan; DreamCrew (2019); SpringHill Entertainment (2019)

Original release
- Network: Channel 4
- Release: 31 October 2011 – 10 September 2013
- Network: Netflix
- Release: 13 September 2019 – 7 September 2023

Top Boy is a British crime drama thriller television series created and written by Ronan Bennett. The series is set on the fictional Summerhouse estate in the London Borough of Hackney. It focuses on two drug dealers, Dushane (Ashley Walters) and Sully (Kane Robinson), along with others involved with drug dealing and gang violence in London.

There are 32 episodes across five series. The first two series, with 4 episodes each, were broadcast on Channel 4, with the first series airing over four consecutive nights from 31 October to 3 November 2011 and the second series airing from 20 August to 10 September 2013. Although storylines for a third series were proposed, the series was dropped by Channel 4 in 2014.

Following interest from Canadian rapper Drake, it was announced in 2017 that Netflix would revive the series, with both Ashley Walters and Kane Robinson, as well as the original crew, reprising their roles, and Drake and his team serving as executive producers. The third and fourth series premiered on Netflix in September 2019 and March 2022, respectively, and were presented as the first and second series of an original Netflix series. The previous two series originally broadcast in the UK were added to Netflix under the name Top Boy: Summerhouse. A fifth and final series (third series produced by Netflix) was renewed on 31 March 2022 and aired on 7 September 2023.

The series has received critical acclaim for its writing, acting, cinematography, themes, realism, and soundtrack, with favourable comparisons to other crime shows such as The Wire, Snowfall, and Power. It has received several awards and nominations from the British Academy Television Awards, including nominations for the British Academy Television Award for Best Mini-Series and Best Actor for Kane Robinson. In addition, it has won Drama Series, Best Original Music, Best Director: Fiction, Best Scripted Casting and Best Supporting Actress for Jasmine Jobson.

== Plot ==
=== Series 1 (2011) ===
The series follows the plight of Ra'nell as he navigates the pitfalls of living on the crime-filled Summerhouse estate after his mother, Lisa, is admitted to a mental hospital. Ra'Nell, who has gained a reputation around the estate for his volatile behaviour after stabbing his abusive father, is quiet and closed off. While his mother is in hospital, he is cared for by her close friend, Leon, who was once a respected enforcer of the estate but has since put his past behind him. Meanwhile, Lisa's pregnant friend Heather enlists Ra'Nell's help to grow a cannabis crop so she can earn enough money to move out of the estate to a safer place.

Meanwhile, his best friend, Gem, realizes he is in over his head when he begins to work for Summerhouse drug dealers Dushane and Sully. Gem is easily coerced and is at the mercy of their trusted enforcer, Dris, who is ruthless and violent.

Dushane and Sully run the estate together with relative ease, but are at risk after Kamale, a rival drug dealer from London Fields, steals a large amount of their supply. They need to find the thief and recover their stash before their supplier, Bobby Raikes, takes action. The urgency of the chase puts Dushane and Sully's partnership in jeopardy.

=== Series 2 (2013) ===
The second series was set one year after the events of the first series. After the police uncover a body, Dushane, Sully, and Dris are arrested. Dushane quickly realises that there is a snitch in their crew, and must deal with the repercussions. The snitch is revealed to be Michael, Dushane's favourite dealer. The police forced him to give information about Dushane.

Meanwhile, Sully is attempting to start up his own crew to rival Dushane's with his friend Mike, a borderline psychopathic ex-convict. When a deal with Dushane's Albanian business partners goes bad, he attempts to enlist Sully's help once more to take them out. He comes into contact with Jason, a neglected boy who is trying to survive in a world filled with drugs and murder.

=== Series 3 (2019) ===
The first series of the revival show takes place five years after the original series. Dushane has fled to Jamaica, where he is getting by working in his uncle's car-rental shop with his cousin. After killing a soldier in imprisoned drug lord Sugar's organisation in a robbery gone wrong, he makes a business deal with Sugar that would ensure no retaliation on his life in return for running an empire in London on Sugar's behalf. He returns to London and enlists the help of Dris and Jaq, who were running Summerhouse by this point while Dushane was away. However, a new crew from London Fields, headed by the ruthless Jamie, won't stand for Dushane stepping on their turf.

While Dushane was in Jamaica, London has become more gentrified and the cost of living has risen. After his return, he learns that his sick mother is being cared for by Shelley, a young carer and single mother. Her eight-year-old daughter begins to form a strong relationship with Dushane.

Sully is in prison with Modie, a murderous drug dealer who ran the rival London Fields gang in Dushane and Sully's absence. An altercation between the two men when queuing up in the prison cafeteria escalates to the point that Sully throws boiling sugar water on Modie's face days before he is due to be released. Modie sees him as an enemy and later in the series, he seeks revenge against Sully.

By then Modie has escaped with the help of Sully's cousin Jermaine, whom Sully had kidnapped in the previous series. When Sully is released, he reconnects with Jason and Gem to begin selling in Ramsgate. Jason is killed in a house fire and Sully reluctantly reunites with Dushane to do business again. Meanwhile, Dris, having suffered a stroke that has left him partially disabled, struggles with his responsibilities after Dushane's return.

Jamie attempts to assert his dominance in the borough; he is driven to provide for his younger brothers, Aaron and Stefan. Their parents both developed cancer and died within days of each other, when Jamie was 18-years-old and the brothers even younger.

He starts business with an upper-class Irish drug supplier, Lizzie, and her husband, Jeffery. Jamie's thirst for power and subsequent battles with Dushane's crew at Summerhouse comprise the main plot throughout this series. Dushane eventually orchestrates Jamie being prosecuted and convicted, and sent to prison. He led police to find a bag filled with weapons and drugs in the flat where Jamie lived with his brothers.

=== Series 4 (2022) ===
The second series of the revival show takes place six months after the events of the last. Dushane wants to expand his empire beyond the streets by making huge investments in London and finding new connections in Spain and Morocco. This causes tensions between the community and his sick mother, who is now aware and ashamed of her son's business.

Jamie, after agreeing to work for Dushane in exchange for Dushane forwarding CCTV footage that would exonerate him, has been released from prison: with his gang now beginning to work with the Summerhouse gang. He attempts to reconnect with his younger brother, Stefan, following his friend Ats's death due to knife crime. But Dushane sends him to sort out a botched drug deal in Spain and Morocco.

Jaq, Dushane's new second-in-command following the death of Dris, tries to rescue her pregnant older sister Lauryn. She is in an abusive relationship with Curtis, a weapons dealer based in Liverpool.

Sully suffers from PTSD in the aftermath of murdering Dris and struggling with the death of his younger friend Jason, who was almost a son to him. He is suspicious about Jamie and Dushane doing business together. Meanwhile, Shelley and other local residents try to fight against Dushane's planned redevelopment of Summerhouse. Shelley comes to terms with her dark past; she was being blackmailed for aiding in the burial of her ex-boyfriend's murder victim.

Sully suspects that Jamie was working with the Moroccans and wasn't to be trusted. To trust his loyalty, Dushane tells Jamie to kill his best friend. Although Jamie completes the task and earns Dushane's trust, Sully shoots Jamie in Jamie's home in front of his brothers.

=== Series 5 (2023) ===
The third series of the revival show takes place immediately after the previous series. After killing Jamie, Sully threatens to kill Dushane next if he doesn't step down as the leader of the Summerhouse gang. Dushane reluctantly does so, and Sully becomes the leader, alongside his friend Junior. Dushane takes the time to focus on helping Shelley expand her business. As the new leader, Sully is forced to form an uneasy alliance with Irish gang leader Jonny McGee and his uncle Tadgh, who killed the Moroccan drug suppliers.

Tormented by Jamie's death, Stefan has been moved to a care home and has been taken under the wing of Jamie's friend and fellow ZT member Si, who encourages Stefan to avenge his brother's death. Stefan refuses, in favour of beginning a relationship with Dris' daughter, Erin, who is now living with her mother and Dris' widow Mandy.

Dushane learns that Lizzie and her accountant friend, Lithe, has stolen £15 million from his account, putting him in a state of desperation and anger, to the point where he kills Lizzie's husband, Jeffrey, and snaps at Shelley, who subsequently breaks up with him due to his obsession with money and power. Dushane's failure to clean up after Jeffrey's murder puts him on the police's radar.

Meanwhile, upon giving birth to a baby boy, Lauryn suffers from post-natal depression and drowns in the bath from a drug overdose. Heartbroken, Jaq becomes disillusioned with selling drugs and decides to steal Sully's drugs to try and stop the cycle of drug use and abuse in her community.

The series finale concludes with Sully shooting Dushane to death for stealing his previously stolen drugs. The next day, Sully walks down the park where he encounters Stefan, who holds Sully at gunpoint. Sully seems fine with dying, but Stefan changes his mind and decides it is not worthwhile. Sully then goes to the car park and starts the engine. After fastening his seatbelt, he is fatally shot in the back of the head through his car by an unknown assailant.

== Cast ==
=== Cast table ===
Actor	Character	Appearances				
Actor	Character	Series 1	Series 2	Series 3	Series 4	Series 5
Ashley Walters	Dushane Hill	Main	Main	Main	Main	Main
Kane Robinson	Gerard "Sully" Sullivan	Main	Main	Main	Main	Main
Malcolm Kamulete	Ra'Nell Smith	Main	Main			
Giacomo Mancini	Gemel "Gem" Mustapha	Main	Main	Recurring		
Shone Romulus	Dris Wright	Main	Main	Main		
Sharon Duncan-Brewster	Lisa Smith	Main	Main			
Kierston Wareing	Heather	Main				
Nicholas Pinnock	Leon	Main				
Letitia Wright	Chantelle	Main				
Benedict Wong	Vincent	Recurring	Main			
Xavien Russell	Michael	Recurring	Main			
Micheal Ward	Jamie Tovell			Main	Main	
Jasmine Jobson	Jacqueline "Jaq" Lawrence			Main	Main	Main
Simbi Ajikawo	Shelley			Main	Main	Main
Hope Ikpoku Jr.	Aaron Tovell			Main	Main	
Araloyin Oshunremi	Stefan Tovell			Main	Main	Main
Keiyon Cook	Attica "Ats" Ayittey			Main		
Jolade Obasola	Amma Ayittey			Main	Main	
Kadeem Ramsay	Kit			Main	Main	
Lisa Dwan	Lizzie Kilfauns			Main	Main	
Saffron Hocking	Lauryn Lawrence			Recurring	Main	Main
NoLay	Mandy		Guest		Recurring	Main
Adwoa Aboah	Becks				Recurring	Main
Joshua Blissett	Kieron Palmer			Recurring	Recurring	Main
Amaya Romulus	Erin Wright	Recurring	Recurring			
Savanah Graham	Erin Wright			Recurring		Main

=== Main ===
- Ashley Walters as Dushane Hill (series 1–5)
- Kane Robinson as Gerard "Sully" Sullivan (series 1–5)
- Shone Romulus as Dris Wright (series 1–3)
- Malcolm Kamulete as Ra'Nell Smith (series 1–2)
- Giacomo Mancini as Gemel "Gem" Mustapha (series 1–2; recurring series 3)
- Sharon Duncan-Brewster as Lisa Smith (series 1–2)
- Kierston Wareing as Heather (series 1)
- Nicholas Pinnock as Leon (series 1)
- Xavien Russell as Michael (series 1–2)
- Micheal Ward as Jamie Tovell (series 3–4)
- Jasmine Jobson as Jacqueline "Jaq" Lawrence (series 3–5)
- Simbi Ajikawo as Shelley (series 3–5)
- Hope Ikpoku Jnr. as Aaron Tovell, Jamie's middle brother (series 3–4)
- Araloyin Oshunremi as Stefan Tovell, Jamie's youngest brother (series 3–5)
- Keiyon Cook as Attica "Ats" Ayittey (series 3)
- Jolade Obasola as Amma Ayittey (series 3–4)
- Kadeem Ramsay as Kit, Jamie's best friend (series 3–4)
- Lisa Dwan as Lizzie Kilfauns (series 3–4)
- Saffron Hocking as Lauryn Lawrence, Jaq's sister (series 4–5; recurring series 3)
- NoLay as Mandy, Dris' girlfriend (series 5; recurring series 4; guest series 2)
- Adwoa Aboah as Becks, Jaq's girlfriend (series 5; recurring series 4)
- Joshua Blissett as Kieron Palmer (series 5; recurring 3–4)
- Savanah Graham as Erin Wright, Dris & Mandy's daughter and Stefan's girlfriend (series 5; recurring series 3, also played by Amaya Romulus (recurring series 1-2))

=== Recurring ===
- Letitia Wright as Chantelle (series 1)
- Sean Sagar as Tareek (series 1)
- Geoff Bell as Bobby Raikes (series 1)
- David Hayman as Joe (series 1–2)
- Benedict Wong as Vincent (series 1–2)
- Cyrus Desir as Lee Greene (series 1)
- Tayo Jarrett as Kamale Lewis (series 1)
- Chiefer Appiah as Ninja (series 1–2)
- Richie Campbell as Chris Hill, Dushane's estranged brother (series 1, 3–4)
- Marsha Millar as Pat Hill, Dushane's mother (series 1, 3–4)
- Clare-Hope Ashitey as Taylor (series 1, 3)
- Paul Anderson as Mike (series 2)
- Dan Jay Green as Rafe Newton (series 2)
- Ashley Thomas as Jermaine Newton, Sully's estranged cousin (series 2–3)
- Ricky Smarts as Jason, Sully's son figure (series 2–3)
- Danielle Flett as Carolyn, Jason's mother (series 2)
- Lorraine Burroughs as Rhianna Parkes, Dushane's lawyer (series 2)
- Nabil Elouahabi as Babrak Mustapha, Gem's father (series 2)
- Michaela Coel as Kayla Thomas (series 2)
- Monique Day as Nevaeh (series 2)
- Weruche Opia as Nafisa (series 2)
- Noah Maxwell Clarke as Shaheed (series 2)
- Kasey McKellar as R-Marni (series 2)
- Andreas Andreou as Collins (series 2)
- David Omoregie as Morris "Modie" Gregory (series 3)
- Seraphina Beh as Farah (series 3–4)
- Kola Bokinni as Leyton (series 3)
- Alessandro Babalola as Haze (series 3)
- Isla Jackson Ritchie as Sarah Morrison (series 3–4)
- Josef Altin as Lee (series 3–4)
- Theo Ogundipe as Ruben Miller (series 3–4)
- Elizabeth Tan as Maude (series 3)
- Unique Spencer as Abby, Aaron's girlfriend (series 3)
- Kiko Armstong as Donovan, Dushane's cousin (series 3)
- Shaun Dingwall as Jeffrey Daughton, Lizzie's husband (series 3–5)
- Michelle Newell as Lithe (series 3–5)
- Dudley O'Shaughnessy as Si, leader of ZT gang after Jamie's death (series 3–5)
- Reniko Francis as Tyrone (series 3–5)
- Nyshai Caynes as Romeo "Romy" Thompson (series 3–5)
- Erin Kellyman as Pebbles, Sully's niece (series 4)
- Jumi Ibitoye as Arlo (series 4–5)
- Conya Toccara as Tia, a young rebellious girl whom Stefan befriends (series 4)
- Howard Charles as Curtis, Lauren's boyfriend (series 4)
- Joséphine de La Baume as Delphine, Sully's love interest (series 4)
- Ava Brennan as Vee, Curtis' sister (series 4)
- Tundy "Trigga" Smith as Speaks, Curtis' friend (series 4)
- TerriAnn Oudjar as Beverley, a lady from Shelley's past who returns to blackmail her (series 4)
- Verona Rose as Naomi, Shelley's friend and employee at Shelley's Nails (series 4–5)
- Hugo Silva as Emilio (series 4)
- Mustapha Abourachid as Mounir (series 4)
- Ash Barba as Chaash (series 4)
- Ilani Marriott Lodge as Samsi (series 4–5)
- Ivan Burdon as Bradders (series 4–5)
- Íñigo de la Iglesia as Juan el Bueno (series 4)
- Marisa Luisa González Guerrero as Sofia, Emilio's wife (series 4)
- Antonio González Guerrero as Antonio, Sofia's brother (series 4)
- Christopher Fulford as Wilson Lee, a crooked lawyer for Dushane (series 4–5)
- Michael Maris as Junior, Sully's new 2nd in command (series 5, guest series 4)
- Barry Keoghan as Jonny McGee, Sully's drug partner (series 5)
- Brian Gleeson as Tadgh McGee, Jonny's uncle (series 5)
- Jazzy de Lizzer as Antonia (series 5)
- Alexander Cobb as Iian (series 5)
- Helder Fernandes as Ali (series 5)
- Jordan Dulski as Chaz (series 5)
- Kenneth Omole as Obi (series 5)
- Emmanuella Aicha Toure as Tayo (series 5)
- Fiona Skinner as Marriene (series 5)
- Brinsley Terence as Bill (series 5)
- Clare Cogan as Linda, Bill's mum (series 5)
- Danielle Walters as Amanda (series 5)
- Mustafa Kahie as Mukhtar
- Arsher Ali as Isaac Latif (series 5)

== Episodes ==
Series	Episodes	Originally released		
Series	Episodes	First released	Last released	Network
1	4	31 October 2011	3 November 2011	Channel 4
2	4	20 August 2013	10 September 2013	Channel 4
3	10	13 September 2019		Netflix
4	8	18 March 2022		Netflix
5	6	7 September 2023		Netflix

=== Series 1 (2011) ===
No. overall	No. in series	Title	Directed by	Written by	Original release date	UK viewers (millions)
1	1	"Episode 1"	Yann Demange	Ronan Bennett	31 October 2011	1.68
Ra’Nell lives with his mother Lisa in Summerhouse Estate, where Dushane and Sully operate a drug dealing operation. Lisa collapses while out shopping and is taken into a mental hospital, leaving Ra’Nell alone at home. Leon, a close friend of Lisa's, checks up on him. Dushane Hill and his underground but thriving crew of drug dealers are robbed by a gang from the nearby London Fields estate, led by Kamale Lewis. Their boss’s enforcer, Lee Greene, demands repayment for the loss. Dushane and his friend and right-hand man Sully ambush Kamale, and Sully stabs him in the leg. They approach Ra’Nell and his friend Gem to convince them to join their operation - Leon warns them to keep their distance from the children. Gem joins Dris and Chantelle, two members of the Summerhouse crew, for a drug deal. During the deal, the group are attacked once again by Kamale’s gang.
2	2	"Episode 2"	Yann Demange	Ronan Bennett	1 November 2011	1.69
Bobby Raikes, Dushane and Sully’s boss, gives them two weeks to retrieve the stash stolen by Kamale. As punishment for the theft, Lee Greene ambushes Dushane’s brother Chris and brands his chest. Sully thinks that Gem is a snake and is secretly conferring the group’s actions to Kamale. Heather, a friend of Lisa's who is currently pregnant, asks Ra'Nell for help running her cannabis farm. Leon is suspicious of Ra’Nell’s behaviour. Dushane beats up Lee in a club. Dushane and Sully kidnap Kamale's cousin in order to force Kamale out of hiding, but Sully accidentally kills him and the boys end up having to dispose of his body. Lisa is allowed to visit home.
3	3	"Episode 3"	Yann Demange	Ronan Bennett	2 November 2011	1.54
Dris waits outside school for Gem, planning to take him to Sully for interrogation. Gem runs away from school with Dris in pursuit. Ra’Nell welcomes his mother home after she is discharged from hospital. Dushane plants members of his crew at Kamale’s cousins’s house and at a roadside memorial for him in the hopes of spotting Kamale. Gem finds his dog has been killed by Dris. Leon confronts Dushane, Sully and Dris about their harassment of Gem. After getting a tip about Kamale’s location, Dushane and his gang kidnap him and beat him up. They take him to a remote location and begin burying him alive until he gives up the location of the stolen stash. Sully then shoots Kamale dead. Dushane and Sully arrive at the location and find Lee, realising he is the snake. Dushane kills Lee with the same gun used against Kamale.
4	4	"Episode 4"	Yann Demange	Ronan Bennett	3 November 2011	1.56
Bobby Raikes confronts Dushane and Sully about Lee’s death. Heather struggles to sell her crop to her buyer Vincent. Seeing her in trouble, Ra’Nell offers the crop to Dushane and Sully. Heather is shocked when Ra’Nell reveals his buyer is Dushane, and confesses the danger she has put Ra’Nell in to his mother, who reacts angrily. Bobby invites Dushane alone to a meeting, and suggests offering Sully to the police to protect the rest of the operation. Dushane refuses. Sully and Dris rob the crop from Ra’Nell - in the process of stopping them, Leon is shot and killed. Dushane arranges a meeting with Bobby under pretence of agreeing with his proposition. He shoots Bobby dead and leaves his body with the gun that killed Kamale, Lee and Leon, framing his death as a suicide. Ra’Nell, in a fit of anger after Leon’s death, steals a knife and tries to stab Dushane, but fails. Dushane arranges to do business with Bobby’s boss, Irish mobster Joe. Gem and Chantelle start a weed farm with Vincent's assistance.

=== Series 2 (2013) ===
No. overall	No. in series	Title	Directed by	Written by	Original release date	UK viewers (millions)
5	1	"Episode 1"	Jonathan van Tulleken	Ronan Bennett	20 August 2013	1.39
One year later, Dushane and Sully's relationship has become strained. Dushane finds immense success working for Joe, whilst Sully and his new friend Mike resort to theft. Dris, still working with Dushane, now takes sole care of his daughter Erin; he is arrested on suspicion of Kamale's murder outside her school, and Dushane and Sully are arrested shortly after. The three of them are released on police bail, and Dushane strikes up a relationship with his solicitor, Rhianna. Michael, a younger member of the Summerhouse crew, takes an interest in the library of a wealthy client. Sully gets his phone stolen by Jason, a street kid from an abusive household. Gem asks Ra'Nell for help after his weed farm has died, leaving him in debt to Vincent. Lisa, now working as a hairdresser, learns that the street her shop is on is being redeveloped. After securing the next pickup of drugs, Joe is gunned down by a mysterious figure.
6	2	"Episode 2"	Jonathan van Tulleken	Ronan Bennett	27 August 2013	1.13
Dushane visits a mortally wounded Joe in hospital, who warns him of the Albanian mafia. Later, Dushane and Rhianna have sex. Michael gets taken by police after being cajoled into shoplifting with his friends, and investigators coerce him into giving up information about Dushane’s involvement in Kamale’s murder. They search the house previously lived at by Kayla Thomas, the woman who Kamale was with before his abduction; Michael lies about having said anything. Desperate for cash, Sully takes up a hit job only to find out the target is his cousin Jermaine. Instead of killing him, he kidnaps him and forces him to tell his brother Rafe to sell his car for him as a ransom. Sully encounters Jason again and is amused with his nonchalant attitude, ultimately taking him under his wing. Ra’Nell grows concerned about Vincent’s increasingly oppressive presence over Gem. Gem's dad tells him that they're likely going to have to move out as the redevelopment plans threaten his chip shop. Dushane and Dris prepare to storm the Albanian brothel, and Rafe finds out that Sully has kidnapped his brother.
7	3	"Episode 3"	Jonathan van Tulleken	Ronan Bennett	3 September 2013	1.07
Rafe finds where Jermaine is being held, and after a violent confrontation, Sully and Mike manage to move him to Jason’s place. Rhianna introduces Dushane to the property developers behind the proposed redevelopments to Summerhouse, and offers to help him invest. She later becomes the solicitor for Kayla Thomas, who is ultimately arrested on suspicion of murder; investigators tell Rhianna about the information Michael gave them, leaving her infuriated. Gem witnesses a traumatic assault during a drug delivery for Vincent; he once again pleads with Ra’Nell for help, and they confront Vincent, who violently beats Ra’Nell. Lisa swears to find a way to get back at Vincent after Ra’Nell begs her not to call the police. A nervous Sully asks Dushane to help mediate the situation between him and Rafe. He manages to secure the release of Jermaine in exchange for protection for Sully, but Rafe insists on still finding a way to get revenge. Dushane offers Sully a chance to reunite by taking down the Albanians together. Sully considers it, but later he and Mike get ambushed by Rafe who executes Mike in front of him.
8	4	"Episode 4"	Jonathan van Tulleken	Ronan Bennett	10 September 2013	1.00
Sully confronts Dushane over Mike’s death, but quickly reconciles with the choice Dushane made to protect him; later, he defends Jason against his abusive dad. Dushane learns from Rhianna that Kayla plans to testify against him and Sully, so the men kidnap her child much to Rhianna’s horror. A guilt-ridden Michael starts having nightmares of Dushane, who has already identified him as the witness and plans to talk to him. Lisa enlists Dushane to deal with Vincent. However, Gem’s dad, who has become aware of what’s happening, stabs and kills Vincent before Dushane can properly confront him. Kayla is successfully intimidated out of testifying, and Rhianna refuses to talk to Dushane again. The men reunite to get Joe’s stolen drugs back from the Albanians, but Sully turns down Dushane’s offer of another long term partnership and leaves with Jason. Gem gets a frosty farewell from Ra’Nell before him and his dad move away, whilst Ra’Nell turns his focus to football practice. Dushane goes to talk to Michael at one of his flats, but the Albanians storm the flat before he gets there; Dushane witnesses them throw Michael off the balcony to his death, and flees in shock.

=== Series 3 (2019) ===
No. overall	No. in series	Title	Directed by	Written by	Original release date
9	1	"Bruk Up"	Reinaldo Marcus Green	Ronan Bennett	13 September 2019
Streetwise Jamie looks to lead a gang and cut old ties for a new supplier. In Jamaica, hardened criminal Dushane is at the mercy of a powerful kingpin.
10	2	"Building Bridges"	Reinaldo Marcus Green	Ronan Bennett	13 September 2019
Dushane returns to London. Jamie juggles family duties with risky responsibilities. Before his prison release, convict Sully is provoked by an inmate.
11	3	"Big Flame"	Reinaldo Marcus Green	Ronan Bennett	13 September 2019
Strapped for cash, Dushane makes a proposition to an old friend and attempts burglary. Beefing with a rival gang, Jamie struggles to keep a low profile.
12	4	"Bonfire Night"	Nia DaCosta	Daniel West	13 September 2019
The feud between the Fields and the A-Roads escalates. A fiery attack puts Sully and Jason in peril. Dushane's plans take an unexpected turn.
13	5	"Smoke Gets in Your Hands"	Nia DaCosta	Ronan Bennett	13 September 2019
As the money rolls in for Dushane and Sully's crew, a threat gets wind of their booming business – and neither party is ready to give up their turf.
14	6	"Press Gang"	Brady Hood	Ronan Bennett	13 September 2019
As the Zero Tolerance gang asserts their power, Dushane's crew attempts to hire young recruits. When Sully becomes a target, the group prepares for war.
15	7	"The Squeeze"	Brady Hood	Daniel West	13 September 2019
Ats makes his first delivery. Jamie's punishment for a detractor goes awry. After a warning from Haze, Dushane looks to eliminate the competition.
16	8	"Bad Eye"	Aneil Karia	Ronan Bennett	13 September 2019
A familiar face breaks free from jail and confronts Jamie about his self-appointed leadership. Lizzie is forced to change her business strategy.
17	9	"Everyone's Got Family"	Aneil Karia	Ronan Bennett	13 September 2019
Bent on taking out Sugar and Jamie, Dushane and Sully orchestrate hits on their rivals – until a surprise shootout shakes their plans.
18	10	"You Don't Know Me"	Aneil Karia	Ronan Bennett	13 September 2019
When an enemy's takedown puts Jamie back in a position of power, Dushane and Sully use their slick tactics to outsmart him.

=== Series 4 (2022) ===
No. overall	No. in series	Title	Directed by	Written by	Original release date
19	1	"Good Morals"	Brady Hood	Ronan Bennett	18 March 2022
With big plans to go legit, Dushane plots new business moves and extends an offer to Jamie. The future of Summerhouse puts furious residents on edge.
20	2	"How Do I Fix This?"	Brady Hood	Ronan Bennett	18 March 2022
Amma receives devastating news. Sully meets a kind stranger. Jaq and the crew handle a matter in-house while Dushane takes an important meeting in Spain.
21	3	"Likkle Favour"	Brady Hood	Daniel West	18 March 2022
After a botched drug shipment, Dushane sends Jamie to Morocco to find a potential leak. Jaq gets revenge on an attacker. The cops move in on Ruben.
22	4	"Fully Loaded Headache"	Koby Adom	Ronan Bennett	18 March 2022
The Summerhouse redevelopment plan puts Dushane at odds with his mother as police work to take Dushane down. In Morocco, another drug delivery is intercepted.
23	5	"15 Points"	Koby Adom	Ronan Bennett	18 March 2022
After a disturbing video circulates on social media, Dushane races to find Sully. Jamie heads to Spain to broker a deal as Lauren searches for a way out.
24	6	"De Capa y Espada"	Myriam Raja	Daniel West	18 March 2022
Jaq tracks down the woman in Ats' video. Dushane attends Ruben's bail hearing. An unexpected visitor arrives in Spain, muddling Jamie's plans.
25	7	"We Ride Out for Family"	William Stefan Smith	Ronan Bennett and Tyrone Rashard	18 March 2022
Shelley confronts her past. Jamie meets with Kit. Bent on getting Lauryn back, Curtis resorts to devious tactics as more issues overwhelm Dushane.
26	8	"Prove Yourself"	William Stefan Smith	Ronan Bennett	18 March 2022
Jaq arranges a meeting with Curtis. The cops hit a bump in their investigation. Jamie's loyalty is put to the test. Dushane has a change of heart.

=== Series 5 (2023) ===
No. overall	No. in series	Title	Directed by	Written by	Original release date
27	1	"Step Back"	Myriam Raja	Ronan Bennett	7 September 2023
Dushane agrees to back Shelley's new business venture. Sully receives a shipment containing a terrible surprise.
28	2	"The Tour"	Myriam Raja	Ronan Bennett	7 September 2023
Jaq spends time with her sister, Lauryn. Sully tries to take care of a new threat, but Dushane won't trust him to do it alone.
29	3	"Birthday Party"	Myriam Raja	Elliot Warren	7 September 2023
Dushane tries to track down his investments. Sully plots a move against his new partners. Shelley's dreams are dashed.
30	4	"The Food Is Killing Us"	Myriam Raja	Tyrone Rashard	7 September 2023
Stefan and Erin take a step forward in their relationship. Shelley calls it quits with Dushane. Jaq starts to doubt everything.
31	5	"Has It Come to This"	William Stefan Smith	Ronan Bennett	7 September 2023
After a daring move, Jaq goes on the run. Sully looks for answers. Dushane learns that investigators are pursuing him closely.
32	6	"If We Are Not Monsters"	William Stefan Smith	Ronan Bennett	7 September 2023
With Summerhouse up in flames, Jaq tries to make things right. Dushane makes preparations to disappear, and Sully is confronted by a ghost from his past.

== Production ==
=== Development ===
Top Boy was written and created by Belfast-born novelist Ronan Bennett. He also produced the series through his production company Eastern Partisan. Bennett was inspired to write the series after he saw a twelve-year-old boy dealing drugs at his local Tesco supermarket in Hackney, London. Bennett, assisted by his friend Gerry Jackson, interviewed several drug dealers in the area about their lifestyle in order to portray the society realistically. Jackson was later credited as a story consultant on the series.

The series pilot was originally commissioned by the BBC, but the head of drama was very critical about the strong violence and profanity in the script. Eventually, Bennett met with producers Charles Steel and Alasdair Flind of Cowboy Films, who gave support. In July 2010, it was announced that the series had been commissioned by Channel 4 as a four-part drama.

=== Casting ===
The series cast UK rappers, along with seasoned and newcoming acting talent. So Solid Crew rapper turned actor Ashley Walters and British rapper Kane Robinson were cast as lead characters Dushane and Sully, respectively. Following his breakthrough performance in the 2004 film Bullet Boy, Walters turned down several roles in urban films and TV shows but he chose to audition for Top Boy because of its realistic characterization. The character of Sully was written as an Asian drug dealer, but casting director Des Hamilton, director Yann Demange, and Bennett were all impressed with Robinson's chemistry test with Walters and rewrote the character for Robinson.

Walters and Robinson led the series alongside other rappers, including Scorcher as London Fields gang leader Kamale. UK rappers Giggs and Sway make cameo appearances in the first series. The first series also featured Shone Romolus as Dris, Dushane and Sully's trusted enforcer; newcomers Malcolm Kamulete and Giacomo Mancini as best friends Ra'Nell and Gem; Sharon Duncan-Brewster as Ra'Nell's mum Lisa; Nicholas Pinnock as Leon, Lisa's friend and a father figure to Ra'Nell; Kierston Wareing as Lisa's pregnant friend Heather; Benedict Wong as cannabis dealer Vincent; and Geoff Bell as drug lord Bobby Raikes. The series also featured a then-eighteen-year-old Letitia Wright as Chantelle, a member of the Summerhouse gang and Gem's love interest.

The second series features the reprisals of Walters, Robinson, Romolus, Kamulete, Mancini, Duncan-Brewster, and Wong with new additions including rapper Bashy as Jermaine, Sully's cousin; Lorraine Burroughs as Rhianna Parkes, Dushane's lawyer; Paul Anderson as Mike, Sully's new business partner; Nabil Elouahabi as Babrak Mustapha, Gem's father; Ricky Smarts as Jason, Sully's friend and son figure; and Michaela Coel as Kayla Thomas, a woman who was in contact with Kamale.

In April 2019, following the series' revival by Netflix, it was announced that Micheal Ward would join the cast as the new London Fields leader Jamie. He previously auditioned to play Jamie's younger brother Aaron. Rappers Dave and Little Simz were cast as Modie and Shelly, respectively. New additions to the third and fourth series include Jasmine Jobson, Hope Ikpoku Jr., Araloyin Oshunremi, Keiyon Cook, Jolade Obasola, Kadeem Ramsay, Lisa Dwan, Joshua Blisset, Saffron Hocking and Adwoa Aboah.

=== Filming locations ===
The Heygate Estate and Loughborough Estate, both in South London, were used as the Summerhouse Estate during the first two series. Production visited several locations in Kent for the third series. Filming took place in Margate at Walpole Bay and Fulsam Rock Beach and nearby streets including Athelstan Road. Production also visited Ramsgate, where they filmed at Jacob's Ladder, outside the Rose of England pub on the High Street and Ramsgate Station. Gordon Place in Gravesend doubles as the fictional Summerhouse Estate throughout the series.

For the third and fourth series, the Samuda Estate in Cubitt Town on the Isle of Dogs in the London Borough of Tower Hamlets and the De Beauvoir Estate in De Beauvoir Town in the London Borough of Hackney double as the Summerhouse Estate. Locations in Liverpool were shown throughout Series 4 Episode 5, with the Dockside Outlet Shopping Centre in Chatham, Kent doubling as an imitation shopping centre in Liverpool.

With the series being set in Hackney much of the filming took place in the borough in areas including London Fields in Hackney, Dalston, Haggerston. Legal scenes in series 4 were filmed in the old Blackfriars Crown Court.

=== Music ===
The original score for the series was composed by Brian Eno and Michael Asante. In addition to its original music, Top Boy features grime, hip-hop and R&B from artists including Ghostpoet, AJ Tracey, Giggs, Central Cee, Roots Manuva, Burna Boy and J Hus.

On 13 September 2019, an original soundtrack for the series, titled Top Boy (A Selection of Music Inspired by the Series), was released by OVO Sound and Warner to accommodate with the release of the third series. The soundtrack includes appearances from OVO's Drake, Baka Not Nice, and Popcaan and British artists AJ Tracey, Avelino, Dave, Fredo, Ghetts, Headie One, Little Simz, M Huncho, Nafe Smallz, Central Cee and SL.

In September 2023, Brian Eno released Top Boy (Score from the Original Series).

=== Cancellation and revival series ===
In 2014, it was announced by Walters that Channel 4 had cancelled the series after two series. Speaking in 2019, Bennett expressed his disappointment about the abrupt cancellation, feeling that Channel 4 cancelling the series was a "smack in the face to the community it was representing".

Around the time of the show's cancellation, Canadian rapper Drake became a fan of the series after watching it in parts on YouTube and posted screenshots of the series on his social media. After learning that a third series was cancelled, Drake met with Walters and the series' producers about reviving the series. Drake bought the rights to the series and pitched it to Netflix, who greenlit the third series in November 2017, with Drake serving as executive producer and most of the original cast and crew reprising their roles. The first series on Netflix (third series overall) was released on 13 September 2019.

In January 2020, the series was renewed for a second series on Netflix (fourth series overall), with filming set to start in the spring of that year. However, due to COVID-19, filming was delayed and started in late 2020. The fourth series was released on Netflix on 18 March 2022.

In March 2022, shortly after the debut of the following series, it was announced that the series was renewed for a third series on Netflix (fifth series overall), which was announced as the final series of the show. It premiered on 7 September 2023.

== Spin-offs ==
In March 2024, Jasmine Jobson stated that she wanted to be a part of a spin-off series, featuring her character "Jaq". In August 2026, Netflix has ordered Jaq to series, with Jobson reprising her titular character and Ryan Calais Cameron serving as creator and writer. In the same month, Netflix has also ordered a five-part prequel series Jonny Boy, with Barry Keoghan reprising his character "Jonny McGee" and Ronan Bennett serving as creator and writer.

== Reception ==
=== Critical reception and viewership ===
Top Boy received positive feedback from critics. The first two series premiered with 1 million viewers and maintained its audience share over the course of its two-year run. Tom Sutcliffe, writing in the Independent, said, "The drama involved virtually no preaching at all, but a sense of morality was everywhere, as bad conscience flickered in the face of the toughest characters and grief hit the culpable and the blameless alike. Best of all, it always found a little time for something other than plot, whether it was banter on stairwells or the melancholy beauty of the city at night. Seriously good television."

The Netflix revival series was met with greater acclaim for its performances, emotional depth, soundtrack, writing, and bigger scope and scale. Rebecca Nicholson, writing in the Guardian, described the third series as "more violent, more gripping and more shocking than ever". Ellen E Jones, also of the Guardian, praised the fourth series, writing that the series "always leaves you guessing", and Leila Latif hailed the fifth and final season as an ending that "rivals the very best of television".
