= Platform 7 =

British television series

- Genre: Psychological thriller
- Based on: Platform Seven by Louise Doughty
- Written by: Paula Milne
- Directed by: Geoffrey Sax
- Starring: Jasmine Jobson; Toby Regbo
- Composer: Toydrum
- Country of origin: United Kingdom
- Original language: English
- No. of series: 1
- No. of episodes: 4

Production
- Executive producers: Chris Carey; Laurence Bowen; Kate Triggs
- Producer: Rosalie Carew
- Production locations: Versa Studios, Leeds, United Kingdom
- Production company: Dancing Ledge Productions

Original release
- Network: ITVX
- Release: 7 December 2023

Platform 7 is a British four-part psychological thriller television series based on the 2019 novel Platform Seven by Louise Doughty, adapted by Paula Milne and developed by Dancing Ledge Productions for ITVX. It was released on ITVX on 7 December 2023, and it aired on 26 August 2024 on ITV1.

== Cast ==
- Jasmine Jobson as Lisa Evans
- Toby Regbo as Matthew Goodson
- Yaamin Chowdhury as Akash Lockhart
- Sacha Parkinson as Melissa
- Reece Ritchie as Richard Shale
- Tábata Cerezo as Rosaria Diaz
- Rhiannon Clements as Izzy
- Phil Davis as Edward Warren
- Emily Carey as Ella Warren
- Patrick Robinson as Trevor Evans
- Natasha Joseph as Evelyn Evans
- Harvey Walker as Student #3
- Lisa Allen as Stacey
- Joe Standerline as Trilby Hat Man
- Roman Brierley as Student #4
- Thomas Pace as Student #5
- Eric as the Station Master

== Episodes ==
No.	Title	Directed by	Written by	Original release date
1	"Episode 1"	Geoffrey Sax	Paula Milne	7 December 2023
2	"Episode 2"	Geoffrey Sax	Paula Milne	7 December 2023
3	"Episode 3"	Geoffrey Sax	Paula Milne	7 December 2023
4	"Episode 4"	Geoffrey Sax	Paula Milne	7 December 2023

== Production ==
In July 2022, ITV commissioned a four-part adaptation of Louise Doughty's Platform Seven from Dancing Ledge Productions, penned by Paula Milne. Chris Carey and Laurence Bowen of Dancing Ledge would executive produce the series with Kate Triggs. The series is produced by Rosalie Carew and was originally set to be directed by Sarah Walker. Post production reports however listed Geoffrey Sax as the Director.

In January 2023, it was announced that Jasmine Jobson would lead Platform 7. Also joining the cast were Toby Regbo, Yaamin Chowdhury, and Phil Davis. Principal photography took place in northern England. The station concourse and forecourt were filmed at Kidderminster on the Severn Valley Railway, with the "platform 7" being filmed at Keighley on the Keighley and Worth Valley railway.

== Reception ==
Lucy Mangan of The Guardian awarded the first episode two stars out of five, criticizing the pacing and script. Jasper Rees of The Daily Telegraph gave it three out of five stars.
