= Muna Otaru =

British actress

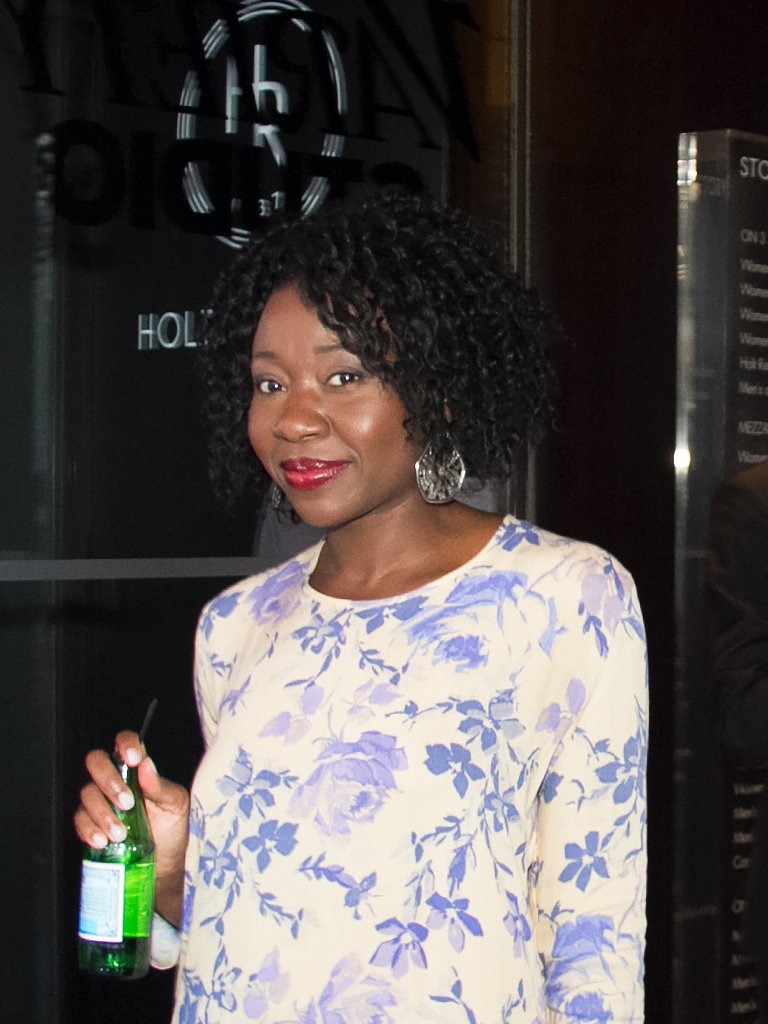
- Born: Liverpool, United Kingdom
- Occupation: Actress
- Years active: 2004–present
- Known for: The Keeping Room

Maimuna "Muna" Otaru is a Liverpool-born British actress known for her role as Mad in the film The Keeping Room.

== Filmography ==
=== Film ===
Year	Title	Role	Notes
2020	Surge	Adaeze	
2020	The Man in the Hat	The Chef	
2014	The Keeping Room	Mad	
2007	Lions for Lambs	Nervous Student	
2007	Rendition	Senate Staffer	

=== Television ===
Year	Title	Role	Notes
2017	Broken	Helen Oyenusi	Five Episodes
2013	Whitechapel	Virginia Ayres	Episode: "The Cost of Living"
2007	Law & Order: Special Victims Unit	Almani Bothame	Episode: "Snitch"
2006	Lost	Amina	Episode: "The Cost of Living"
2004	The Wire	'College records clerk'	Episode: "Hamsterdam"
