= Surge (2020 British film) =

- Atlàntida Film Fest poster
- Directed by: Aneil Karia
- Written by: Aneil Karia; Rupert Jones; Rita Kalnejais
- Produced by: Julia Godzinskaya; Sophie Vickers
- Starring: Ben Whishaw; Ellie Haddington; Ian Gelder; Jasmine Jobson
- Cinematography: Stuart Bentley
- Edited by: Amanda James
- Music by: Tujiko Noriko
- Production companies: BBC Films; British Film Institute; Protagonist Pictures; Split Prism Media; Rooksnest Entertainment
- Distributed by: Vertigo Releasing
- Release dates: 26 January 2020 (Sundance); 28 May 2021 (United Kingdom)
- Running time: 105 minutes
- Country: United Kingdom
- Language: English
- Box office: $34,444

Surge is a 2020 British psychological drama thriller film, directed by Aneil Karia from a screenplay by Karia, Rupert Jones and Rita Kalnejasis. It stars Ben Whishaw, Ellie Haddington, Ian Gelder and Jasmine Jobson.

It had its world premiere at the Sundance Film Festival on 26 January 2020 and was released in the United Kingdom on 28 May 2021, by Vertigo Releasing.

== Premise ==
A mentally ill man goes on a bold and reckless journey of self-liberation in London.

== Cast ==
- Ben Whishaw as Joseph, Alan and Joyce’s son
- Ellie Haddington as Joyce, Joseph’s mother and Alan’s wife
- Ian Gelder as Alan, Joseph’s father and Joyce’s husband
- Jasmine Jobson as Lily
- Laurence Spellman as Scott
- Ryan McKen as Emre
- Muna Otaru as Adaeze
- Bradley Taylor as Patrick
- Ranjit Singh Shubh as Jonathon
- Chris Coghill as Hamish (Best Man)
- Clare Joseph as Sarah (Bride)
- Perry Fitzpatrick as Bradley

== Release ==
The film had its world premiere at the Sundance Film Festival on 26 January 2020. In January 2021, Vertigo Releasing acquired U.K. and Irish distribution rights to the film. It was released on 28 May 2021. In June 2021, FilmRise acquired U.S. distribution rights to the film. The film went on to gross $34,444 worldwide.

== Critical reception ==
On the review aggregator website Rotten Tomatoes, 79% of 56 critics' reviews are positive. The website's consensus reads: "Discomfiting by design, Surge will wear some viewers down -- but Ben Whishaw's mesmerizing performance keeps the action gripping even when it's hard to take." Metacritic, which uses a weighted average, assigned the film a score of 51 out of 100, based on 14 critics, indicating "mixed or average" reviews.

Whishaw received World Cinema Dramatic Special Jury Award for Acting at the Sundance Film Festival.
