= Broken (British TV series) =

2017 British television drama series

- Genre: Drama
- Created by: Jimmy McGovern
- Written by: Jimmy McGovern; Nick Leather; Colette Kane; Shaun Duggan
- Directed by: Ashley Pearce; Noreen Kershaw
- Starring: Sean Bean; Adrian Dunbar; Anna Friel; Muna Otaru; Mark Stanley; Aisling Loftus; Paula Malcolmson; Ned Dennehy; Danny Sapani
- Opening theme: "I Think It's Going to Rain Today" by Nina Simone
- Ending theme: "Broken" by Ray Davies
- Composers: Matthew Hall; Stephen Vedmore
- Country of origin: United Kingdom
- Original language: English
- No. of series: 1
- No. of episodes: 6

Production
- Executive producers: Colin McKeown; Jimmy McGovern; Sean Bean
- Producer: Donna Molloy
- Cinematography: Joel Devlin
- Editors: Patrick Hall; Kyle Ogden
- Running time: 60 minutes
- Production company: LA Productions

Original release
- Network: BBC One
- Release: 30 May – 4 July 2017

Broken is a six-part British television drama series, created by Jimmy McGovern, that first broadcast on BBC One on 30 May 2017. The series focuses on Michael Kerrigan (Sean Bean), the priest of a Roman Catholic parish in a northern English city, who despite suffering from his own troubles stemming from a traumatic childhood, tries to guide several of his most vulnerable parishioners through the trials and tribulations of everyday life.

The series was directed by Ashley Pearce and Noreen Kershaw; while Shaun Duggan, Colette Kane and Nick Leather all contributed to McGovern's scripts. The series was released on DVD on 10 July 2017.

Bean won a British Academy Television Award for Best Actor while Friel was nominated for Best Supporting Actress.

== Cast ==
=== Main ===
- Sean Bean as Father Michael Kerrigan
- Adrian Dunbar as Father Peter Flaherty
- Anna Friel as Christina Fitzsimmons
- Muna Otaru as Helen Oyenusi
- Mark Stanley as PC Andrew Powell
- Aisling Loftus as PC Dawn Morris
- Paula Malcomson as Roz Demichelis
- Ned Dennehy as Karl McKenna
- Danny Sapani as Daniel Martin

=== Supporting ===
- Clare Calbraith as Mariella Fitzsimmons
- Paul Copley as Joe Kerrigan
- Iain Hoskins as Policeman
- Vanessa Earl as Beth Kerrigan
- Steve Garti as Eddie Kerrigan
- Jerome Holder as Vernon Oyenusi
- Lauren Lyle as Chloe Demichelis
- David McClelland as Christopher Kerrigan
- Faye McKeever as Caroline Powell
- Eileen Nicholas as 'Nan' Fitzsimmons
- Naomi Radcliffe as Pauline Pickering
- Sam Rintoul as Young Michael Kerrigan
- Rochenda Sandall as Jean Reid
- Matthew Wilson as PC Ian Wakefield
- Ralphie Urwin as school boy

== Production and filming ==
The series, produced by LA Productions, was commissioned in 2015; with filming taking place throughout 2016.

This series was filmed in Liverpool, although the city is not directly mentioned in the series itself. Some scenes are shot in trains, implying that Father Michael commutes between his Lancashire parish and his Irish mother and second-generation siblings in Sheffield. The featured church is St Francis Xavier Church, Liverpool.

== Episodes ==
No.	Title	Directed by	Written by	Original release date	UK viewers (millions)
1	"Christina"	Ashley Pearce	Jimmy McGovern	30 May 2017	4.95
Mum-of-three Christina Fitzsimmons hits a new low after losing her job. Forced to sell her most valuable possessions, Christina begins to find that even filling the fridge on a weekly basis is becoming a struggle. When her mum unexpectedly passes away, Christina seizes the opportunity to continue claiming her state pension by failing to declare her death. However, her sister, Mariella, becomes suspicious and eventually begins to uncover the truth. Meanwhile, Father Michael Kerrigan finds that traumatic flashbacks to his childhood are becoming more and more frequent; but as he becomes aware of Christina's increasing problems, he puts his own troubles to one side to try and help her.
2	"Helen"	Ashley Pearce	Jimmy McGovern	6 June 2017	4.85
Christina is arrested and sent before the magistrate, and receives a six-month sentence, suspended for two years. A woman unknown to Father Kerrigan, Roz, approaches him in confession to express her plan to commit suicide. Having stolen £230,000 from her bosses, she fears that being found out will make her a pariah among her friends. Meanwhile, single mother Helen Oyenusi learns of her son Vernon's impending discharge from a local mental health unit, for the given reason that he is the 'least unwell' of all of the current inpatients - and a bed is urgently required. However, shortly after his release, Vernon finds himself in an armed showdown with the police which ends in tragedy.
3	"Andrew"	Ashley Pearce	Jimmy McGovern & Nick Leather	13 June 2017	4.48
The fallout of Vernon Oyenusi's death plays hard on the conscience of PC Andrew Powell, who against the advice of his superiors, gives a witness statement laying the blame for Vernon's death on the actions of fellow colleague, PC Dawn Morris. As Andrew slowly begins to discover that his friends and colleagues have turned against him, he approaches Father Michael for guidance. Torn between his principles and his friends, Andrew is forced to make a heartbreaking decision. Meanwhile, Roz decides to donate all of her worldly goods to the church charity fund as she continues with her plan to commit suicide, and Father Michael comes face to face with his former childhood abuser.
4	"Roz"	Noreen Kershaw	Jimmy McGovern & Colette Kane	20 June 2017	4.54
Roz's deception is finally uncovered when she is caught out by an undated cheque. After admitting to the theft of £232,648, Roz asks her boss to hold off calling the police so that she can spend one final night with her children. Father Michael asks Roz to make her feelings known to the church committee, not only to prevent a further betting shop opening in the parish, but in the hope that she will find some form of redemption and clear her conscience. Roz asks Father Michael to be her 'saving grace', in the event that she changes her mind and decides not to go ahead with her plan. However, she anticipates his attempt to intervene in her suicide, changing her plans and making his attempt futile.
5	"Carl"	Noreen Kershaw	Jimmy McGovern & Shaun Duggan	27 June 2017	4.42
Helen's devout brother, Daniel, having just arrived from Trinidad for his nephew Vernon's funeral, encounters homosexual neighbour Carl and clashes violently with him. Carl threatens to charge Daniel with a hate crime offence unless he apologises. Father Michael tries to mediate but it is ultimately Helen who is the peacemaker.
6	"Father Michael"	Ashley Pearce	Jimmy McGovern	4 July 2017	4.13
Father Michael confesses to Father Flaherty that he feels unsuitable as a priest, due to his painful flashbacks each time he celebrates the eucharist, and announces he will resign when his mother dies. Father Michael helps Chloe and her two teenage brothers, orphaned after their mother's suicide. Chloe angrily takes a sledge-hammer to the gambling machines to which her mother had been addicted. Father Michael fears she will end up in prison unless she stops her rampages, and therefore incites his parishioners to join in wrecking the machines. Police officer Andrew's truthful testimony in court convinces a jury that Helen's son Vernon had been unlawfully killed. Father Michael's mother dies and he conducts her funeral Mass, where a sudden calm during the moment of consecration and the support of the people he has helped reconciles him to his role as priest.

== Broadcast ==
The series was originally due to begin on 23 May, but the broadcast was postponed following the Manchester Arena bombing the previous night, and was replaced in the schedules by a repeat of Planet Earth II. This was due to the nature of the storyline in the first episode, which focuses on mum-of-three Christina Fitzsimmons (Anna Friel), who after losing her job, resorts to keeping her mother's death a secret in order to continue claiming her state pension.
