= Truelove (TV series) =

British Television series

- Created by: Charlie Covell; Iain Weatherby
- Screenplay by: Iain Weatherby; Cherish Shirley
- Directed by: Chloë Wicks; Carl Tibbetts
- Starring: Lindsay Duncan; Clarke Peters; Sue Johnston; Phil Davis
- Country of origin: United Kingdom
- Original language: English
- No. of series: 1
- No. of episodes: 6

Production
- Executive producers: Emily Harrison; Andy Baker; Petra Fried; Charlie Covell; Iain Weatherby
- Producer: Alex Walsh-Taylor
- Production company: Clerkenwell Films

Original release
- Network: Channel 4
- Release: 3 January – 18 January 2024

Truelove is a six-part British drama series for Channel 4 starring Lindsay Duncan and Clarke Peters. The series asks the question: "is it ever right to help end a life?" and was created by Charlie Covell and Iain Weatherby for Clerkenwell Films. It premiered on 3 January 2024.

== Synopsis ==
Phil (Duncan) and Ken (Peters) were teenage sweethearts, now in their seventies, who never quite managed to forget each other, and are reunited at a funeral. With three old friends, Tom, Marion and David, they attend a drunken wake in a pub named The Knot (or The Truelovers' Knot) after two lovers who hanged themselves in a suicide pact. Since Phil is ex-police, David an ex-doctor and Ken is ex-SAS they hypothesise that when their own deaths are near, and if they are in pain or losing their minds, Ken could 'bump them off' and the others cover it up or access drugs to make it possible. The aim would be to make the end comfortable so they do not face a lingering death. They make this a promise and a toast to 'true love'.

The story then explores what actually happens when Tom receives a terminal cancer diagnosis and Marion develops dementia. In addition a romance grows between Phil and Ken despite Phil being married.

== Cast ==
- Lindsay Duncan as Phil
- Clarke Peters as Ken
- Sue Johnston as Marion
- Phil Davis as Nigel
- Peter Egan as David
- Karl Johnson as Tom
- Fiona Button as Kate
- Zee Asha as Belinda
- Alison Fitzjohn as Shirley
- Kate Rutter as Barbara
- Andrea Valls as PC Harding
- Isabelle Pratt as Alexandra
- Isaac Vincent-Norgate as Albert
- Kiran Sonia Sawar as Ayesha

== Episodes ==
No.	Title	Directed by	Written by	Original release date	U.K. viewers (millions)
1	TBA	Chloë Wicks	Iain Weatherby	3 January 2024	N/A
2	TBA	Chloë Wicks	Iain Weatherby	4 January 2024	N/A
3	TBA	Chloë Wicks	Iain Weatherby	10 January 2024	N/A
4	TBA	Carl Tibbetts	Cherish Shirley	11 January 2024	N/A
5	TBA	Carl Tibbetts	Iain Weatherby	17 January 2024	N/A
6	TBA	Carl Tibbetts	Iain Weatherby	18 January 2024	N/A

== Production ==
The series was announced by Channel 4 in May 2022 from a script written by Iain Weatherby and produced by Charlie Covell and Weatherby for Clerkenwell Films. The producer is Alex Walsh-Taylor with Emily Harrison, Andy Baker, Petra Fried, Covell and Weatherby as executive producers.

=== Casting ===
Julie Walters was attached to the project. However, after production was paused for Walters to consult with doctors over severe back pain she ultimately had to pull out due to health problems. She was replaced in the cast by Lindsay Duncan and all other cast members were able to return for filming to reconvene.

=== Filming ===
Filming got underway in Clevedon, Burnham-on-Sea, and Bristol in the summer of 2022. After a hiatus filming had resumed in Bristol and Clevedon by May 2023 with Chloë Wicks and Carl Tibbetts directing.

== Broadcast ==
The series was broadcast in the UK on Channel 4 from 3 January 2024.

== Reception ==
Lucy Mangan in The Guardian praised the performances calling Lindsay Duncan "magnificent” and "perfect". She also praised Iain Weatherby’s script as "Full of great lines, but also deft, dense and….deeply moving." Anita Singh in The Daily Telegraph said it was "glorious” and praised the "witty" script. Carol Midgeley in The Times described it as "compelling” but the subject matter was "brutal stuff".
