= Royal Television Society Craft & Design Awards =

Annual British Television Awards

RTS Craft & Design Awards
- Current: #2024
- Date: 4 December 2023
- Location: London Hilton on Park Lane, London
- Country: United Kingdom and Ireland
- Hosted by: Eddie Kadi
- First award: 1997; 29 years ago
- Website: rts.org.uk/awards/craft-design-awards

The Royal Television Academy Craft & Design Awards, often referred to as RTS Craft & Design Awards, are given annually by the Royal Television Society to recognize the "huge variety of skills and processes involved in programme production". The awards were presented for the first time in 1997, with twenty-two categories being awarded.

Unlike the Royal Television Society Programme Awards, which usually take place on March, the craft and design awards are held later in the year in November. The most recent edition of the awards took place on 2 December 2024 at the London Hilton on Park Lane, London, and was hosted by television presenter Charlotte Hawkins.

== Categories ==
As of 2023, 28 competitive categories are presented.

- Casting
- Costume Design - Scripted
- Costume Design - Non-Scripted
- Design - Programme Content Sequences
- Design - Titles
- Director - Scripted
- Director - Non-Scripted
- Director - Multicamera
- Editing - Scripted
- Editing - Non-Scripted
- Editing - Entertainment and Comedy
- Editing - Sport
- Effects - SFX
- Effects - VFX
- Lighting for Multicamera
- Make Up Design - Scripted
- Make Up Design - Non-Scripted
- Multicamera Work
- Music Original Score - Scripted
- Music Original Score - Non-Scripted
- Photography - Scripted
- Photography - Non-Scripted
- Picture Enhancement
- Production Design - Scripted
- Production Design - Non-Scripted
- Production Management Award
- Sound - Scripted
- Sound - Non-Scripted
- Special awards such as the RTS Special Award and the RTS Outstanding Contribution Award have been given.

== Winners and nominees ==
The winners are listed first and in bold, followed by the nominees if present.

=== 2024 ===
The RTS Craft & Design Awards 2024 were presented on 2 December 2024 at the London Hilton on Park Lane, London. It was hosted by television presenter Charlotte Hawkins. The nominations were announced on 5 November 2024.

Casting Award	Production Management Award
**Boarders – Rosalie Clayton (BBC Three)**; Lost Boys and Fairies – Lauren Evans (BBC One); Mr Bates vs The Post Office – Jill Trevellick (ITV)	**Squid Game: The Challenge – Production Management Team (Netflix)**; Planet Earth III – Production Management Team (BBC One); Race Across the World – Production Management Team (BBC One)
Costume Design – Scripted	Design – Titles
**The Long Shadow – Orla Smyth-Mill (ITV)**; Eric – Suzanne Cave (Netflix); Lost Boys and Fairies – Andrew Cox (BBC One)	**Boiling Point – Oleg Loginov, Jason Bradbury, Niall Webster, Malou van Rooij, Intermission Film & Mr. Webster Film (BBC One)**; Match of the Day: "UEFA Euro 2024" – BBC Sport, BBC Creative (BBC One); Spent – Andy Johnston (BBC Two)
Design – Programme Content Sequences
**The Battle to Beat Malaria – Oliver Smyth (BBC Two)**
Director – Scripted	Director – Non-Scripted
**One Day – Molly Manners (Netflix)**; Juice – Rosco 5 (BBC Three); Mr Bates vs The Post Office – James Strong (ITV)	**Hell Jumper – Paddy Wivell (BBC Two)**; Me and the Voice in My Head – Tom Green & Tommy Forbes (Channel 4); Six Silent Killings: Ireland’s Vanishing Triangle – Colette Camden (Sky Documentaries)
Director – Multicamera	Picture Enhancement
**Coldplay at Glastonbury 2024 – Janet Fraser (BBC One)**; Match of the Day: "FA Cup Final" – Andrew Swift (BBC One); RAYE at the Royal Albert Hall – Paul Dugdale (BBC One)	Eric – Toby Tomkins (Netflix); Mammals: "Dark" – Picture Finishing Team (BBC One); The Jetty – Duncan Russell (BBC One)
Editing – Scripted	Editing – Non-Scripted
**Masters of the Air – Mark Sanger (Apple TV+)**; Baby Reindeer – Peter Oliver, Mike Holliday & Benjamin Gerstein (Netflix); This Town – Ben Yeates (BBC One)	**Atomic People – Otto Burnham (BBC Two)**; Me and the Voice in My Head – Garry Crystal (Channel 4); The Body Next Door – Hamit Shonpal, Kanwaljeet Thind & Asim Ali (Sky)
Editing – Entertainment and Comedy	Editing – Sport
**Peacock – Gareth Heal (BBC Three)**; Big Boys – Gareth McEwen (Channel 4); Dodger – Christopher Bird & David Head (CBBC)	**Andy Murray: Will to Win – Nicolas Perry & Mandii Kuller (BBC One)**; Jude Bellingham Feature – Euro 2024 – Harry Cambage & Scott Cassidy (ITV); Cricket – The Late Cut – Steve Wakeford (Sky Sports)
Effects – SFX	Effects – VFX
**Eric – Becky Johnson & Paul Vincett (Stitches & Glue) (Netflix)**; Doctor Who – Real SFX (BBC One); Masters of the Air – Neil Corbould, Caimin Bourne, Stuart Heath & Glen Winchester (Apple TV+)	**The Tattooist of Auschwitz – Alan Church, Simon Giles, David Schneider & James Hattsmith (Sky)**; Eric – VFX Team (Netflix); The Crown – Ben Turner, Reece Ewing, Framestore & Rumble VFX (Netflix)
Lighting for Multicamera	Multicamera Work
**Gladiators – Nigel Catmur, Joe Phillips, Oliver Lifely & Martin Higgins (BBC One)**; The Traitors – James Tinsley (BBC One)	**Celebrity SAS: Who Dares Wins – Camera Team (Channel 4)**; Banged Up – Danny Tate (Channel 4); The Traitors – Camera Team (BBC One)
Make Up Design – Scripted	Make Up Design – Non-Scripted
**Three Little Birds – Sharon Miller, Kym Menzies-Foster & Kelly Taylor (ITV)**; Lost Boys and Fairies – Emma Cowen (BBC One); The Tattooist of Auschwitz – Frances Hounsom & Vincent Van Dyke (Sky)	**Secrets of the Neanderthals – Suzi Battersby & Megan Thomas (Netflix)**; Gladiators – Jacqui Mallett (BBC One); Hannah Waddingham: Home for Christmas – Debbie Dannell, Sophie Roberts, Lewis Pallett & Lisa Houghton (Apple TV+)
Multicamera Work - Sport
**World Darts Championship Final 2024 – Sean Randle (Sky Sports)**; Football – Luton vs Arsenal – Jamie Oakford (Amazon Prime); London Marathon – Matthew Griffiths (BBC One)
Music Original Score – Scripted	Music Original Score – Non-Scripted
**We Are Lady Parts – Shez Manzoor, Nida Manzoor, Sanya Manzoor & Benjamin Fregin (Channel 4)**; Renegade Nell – Oli Julian & Nick Foster (Disney+); True Detective: Night Country – Vince Pope (Sky Atlantic)	**Queens – Morgan Kibby (Disney+)**; Otto Baxter: Not a F***ing Horror Story – Ed Harcourt (Sky); Planet Earth III: "Extremes" – Hans Zimmer, Jacob Shea, Sara Barone & Russell Emanuel (BBC One)
Photography – Scripted	Photography – Non-Scripted
**Eric – Benedict Spence (Netflix)**; Baby Reindeer – Krzysztof Trojnar (Netflix); Lost Boys and Fairies – Philipp Haberlandt (BBC One)	**Earthsounds – Photography Team (Apple TV+)**; Animals Up Close with Bertie Gregory – Camera Team (Disney+); JFK: The Home Movie That Changed the World – Simon Fanthorpe, Sarah Hunt, Steve Anderson & Nick Tanner (ITV)
Production Design – Scripted	Production Design – Non-Scripted
**Doctor Who – Phil Sims (BBC One)**; The Crown – Martin Childs & Alison Harvey (Netflix); The Tattooist of Auschwitz – Stevie Herbert, Pilar Foy & Phil Noall (Sky)	**The Enfield Poltergeist – Natalie O'Connor (Apple TV+)**; D-Day: The Unheard Tapes – Matthew Button, Daniela Faggio, Peter Arnold, Gavin Morris, Rachel Hubbard & Lennie Beare (BBC Two); Taskmaster – James Dillon (Channel 4)
Sound – Scripted	Sound – Non-Scripted
**Baby Reindeer – James Ridgway, Matt Skelding, Jake Whitelee & Tom Jenkins (Netflix)**; Kaos – Sound Team (Netflix); The Gentlemen – Sound Team (Netflix)	**The Enfield Poltergeist – Nick Ryan, Ben Baird and Sound Team (Apple TV+)**; Robbie Williams – Tristan Powell, Patrick Fripp, Claire Ellis & Greg Gettens (Netflix); World of Sound With David Attenborough – Sound Team (Sky)
RTS Special Award	RTS Outstanding Contribution Award
**The TV Collective**; **The Film and TV Charity**; **The TV Mindset**	**Peter Kosminsky**

=== 2023 ===
The RTS Craft & Design Awards 2023 were presented on 4 December 2023 at the London Hilton on Park Lane, London. It was hosted by television presenter and comedian Eddie Kadi. The nominations were announced on 9 November 2023.

Casting Award	Production Management Award
**Somewhere Boy – Catherine Willis (Channel 4)**; Dreaming Whilst Black – Heather Basten (BBC Three); The Sixth Commandment – Julie Harkin, Nathan Toth (BBC One)	**Eurovision Song Contest 2023 – Production Management Team (BBC One)**; 24 Hours in Police Custody – Georgie Emary-Witts (Channel 4); Inside Our Autistic Minds – Shiva Talwar (BBC)
Costume Design – Scripted	Costume Design – Non-Scripted
**The English – Phoebe de Gaye (BBC Two)**; Funny Woman – Pam Downe (Sky Max); Silo – Charlotte Morris (Apple TV+)	**The Masked Singer – Plunge Creations & Bandicoot Scotland (ITV)**; Ant & Dec's Saturday Night Takeaway – Shereen Shimmin, Abbie Williams, Jackie Young, Jonathan Skinner (ITV); RuPaul's Drag Race: UK vs the World – Zaldy, Eve Collins (BBC Three)
Design – Programme Content Sequences	Design – Titles
**Newsround: "Ukraine: The Children's Story" – Made in Colour (BBC Two)**; North Korea: The Insiders – Made in Colour (BBC News); Princess Anne: The Plot To Kidnap A Royal – Production Team (Channel 4)	**The English – Chris Billig, Stephen Fuller, Colin Hess, Danny Kamhaji (BBC Two)**; Queen Charlotte: A Bridgerton Story – Manddy Wyckens, Joe Dennis (Netflix); The Gallows Pole – Ed Kevill-Davies, Lucas Roche (BBC Two)
Director – Scripted	Director – Non-Scripted
**Jungle – Junior Okoli (Prime Video)**; I Hate Suzie Too – Dawn Shadforth (Sky Atlantic); Somewhere Boy – Alex Winckler (Channel 4)	**Children of the Taliban – Marcel Mettelsiefen, Jordan Bryon (Channel 4)**; Dublin Narcos – Benedict Sanderson (Sky Documentaries); Inside Our Autistic Minds – Joe Myerscough, Emma Jones (BBC)
Director – Multicamera	Picture Enhancement
**The State Funeral of HM Queen Elizabeth II – Directing Team (BBC One)**; Springwatch2023 – James Morgan, Chris Whiterod (BBC Two); The Coronation of TM King Charles III and Queen Camilla – Simon Staffurth (BBC One)	**The Gallows Pole – Paul Harrison, Owen Hulme (BBC Two)**; Hatton – Mark Mulcaster (Sky Atlantic); Somewhere Boy – Thomas Urbye, Grace Weston (Channel 4)
Editing – Scripted	Editing – Non-Scripted
**I Am Ruth – David Charap (Channel 4)**; Blue Lights – Peggy Koretzky (BBC One); I Hate Suzie Too – Fin Oates, Jo Walker, Joe Randall-Cutler (Sky Atlantic)	**LYRA – Chloe Lambourne (Channel 4)**; Dublin Narcos – Bradley Manning, Bruce Law (Sky Documentaries); Fight the Power: How Hip-Hop Changed the World – (BBC Two)
Editing – Entertainment and Comedy	Editing – Sport
**There She Goes: "414" – Gareth Heal (BBC Two)**; Am I Being Unreasonable? – Jamie Pearson, Helena Evans (BBC One); Dreaming Whilst Black – Ashley White (BBC Three)	**Hatton – Sam Bergson (Sky Atlantic)**; The Ashes – Steve Wakeford (Sky Sports); Villeneuve Pironi – Ian Grech (Sky Atlantic)
Effects – SFX	Effects – VFX
**SAS: Rogue Heroes – Stefano Corridori (BBC One)**; Hijack – Paul Dimmer (Apple TV+); World on Fire – Frankie Waite, Ignite SFX (BBC One)	**His Dark Materials – Effects Team (BBC One)**; Prehistoric Planet – Elliot Newman, Kirstin Hall, Andy Hargreaves, MPC Team (Apple TV+); The Power – VFX Team (Prime Video)
Lighting for Multicamera	Multicamera Work
**Eurovision Song Contest 2023 – Tim Routledge, James Scott, Morgan Evans (BBC One)**; The Coronation Concert – Nigel Catmur (BBC One); The Traitors – James Tinsley (BBC One)	**The State Funeral of HM Queen Elizabeth II – Camera Team (BBC One)**; Eurovision Song Contest 2023 – Camera Team (BBC One); The Coronation of TM King Charles III and Queen Camilla – Multicamera Team (BBC One)
Make Up Design – Scripted	Make Up Design – Non-Scripted
**Funny Woman – Sue Michael (Sky Max)**; Litvinenko – Samantha Kininmonth, Suzi Battersby (ITVX); Queen Charlotte: A Bridgerton Story – Nic Collins, Giorgio Galliero (Netflix)	**Fantasy Football League – Nicola Coleman (Sky Max)**; RuPaul's Drag Race UK – David Petruschin, Julie Cooper, Sam Regan (BBC Three); Strictly Come Dancing – Lisa Armstrong, Lisa Davey (BBC One)
Music Original Score – Scripted	Music Original Score – Non-Scripted
**I Hate Suzie Too – Johnny Lloyd, Peter Saville, Zoë Bryant (Sky Atlantic)**; Black Ops – Tawiah, Lindsay Wright (BBC One); The English – Federico Jusid (BBC Two)	**Once Upon a Time in Northern Ireland – Simon Russell (BBC One)**; Prehistoric Planet – Hans Zimmer, Anze Rozman, Kara Talve (Apple TV+); The Reluctant Traveler with Eugene Levy – David Schweitzer (Apple TV+)
Photography – Scripted	Photography – Non-Scripted
**Then You Run – Annika Summerson (Sky Max)**; Jungle – Chas Appeti (Prime Video); SAS: Rogue Heroes – Stephan Pehrsson (BBC One)	**Children of the Taliban – Marcel Mettelsiefen, Jordan Bryon (Channel 4)**; Dublin Narcos – Narayan Van Maele, Patrick Smith, Jim Incledon, Benedict Sanderson (Sky Documentaries); Kids – Jack Wood (Channel 4)
Production Design – Scripted	Production Design – Non-Scripted
**Funny Woman – Jacqueline Smith (Sky Max)**; SAS: Rogue Heroes – Richard Bullock (BBC One); The English – Chris Roope (BBC Two)	**The Traitors – Mathieu Weekes, Bizibot Productions (BBC One)**; Strictly Come Dancing – Catherine Land, Caroline Berry-Reid (BBC One); The Coronation Concert – Stufish (BBC One)
Sound – Scripted	Sound – Non-Scripted
**Great Expectations – Sound Team (BBC One)**; Gangs of London – Sound Team (Sky Atlantic); Slow Horses – Joe Beal, Andrew Sissons, Martin Jensen (Apple TV+)	**Aftershock: Everest and the Nepal Earthquake – Claire Ellis, Will Chapman, Greg Gettens (Netflix)**; Break Point – Nas Parkash, Will Chapman, Billy Poole, Andrew Yarme (Netflix); Frozen Planet II – Kate Hopkins, Tim Owens, Graham Wild (BBC One)
RTS Special Award	RTS Outstanding Contribution Award
**Ralph & Katie**	**Justine Evans**

=== 2022 ===
The RTS Craft & Design Awards 2022 were presented on 5 December 2022 at the London Hilton on Park Lane, London. It was hosted by television presenter and journalist Ranvir Singh. The nominations were announced on 14 November 2022.

Casting Award	Production Management Award
**Heartstopper – Daniel Edwards (Netflix)**; The Baby – Aisha Bywaters (Sky Atlantic); In My Skin – Rachel Sheridan (BBC Three)	**Concert for Ukraine – Laura Djanogly, Jen Bollom, Mei Ye Li (ITV)**; The Essex Serpent – Karl Liegis (Apple TV+); Then Barbara Met Alan – Production Management Team (Netflix)
Costume Design – Drama	Costume Design – Entertainment & Non Drama
**Peaky Blinders – Alison McCosh (BBC One)**; Gentleman Jack – Tom Pye, Nadine Clifford-Davern (BBC One / HBO); Sherwood – Orla Smyth-Mill (BBC One)	**The Masked Singer – Plunge Creations & Bandicoot Scotland (ITV)**; Ant & Dec's Saturday Night Takeaway – Shereen Shimmin (ITV); RuPaul's Drag Race UK – Zaldy, Eve Collins (BBC Three)
Design – Programme Content Sequences	Design – Titles
**Newsround: "Empire & Me" – Made in Colour (CBBC)**; Prehistoric Planet – MPC Team (Apple TV+); AIDS: The Unheard Tapes – Production Team (BBC Two)	**The Essex Serpent – yU+co (Apple TV+)**; Around the World in 80 Days – Paul McDonnell, Hugo Moss, Ben Hanbury, Tamsin McGee (BBC One); Beijing 2022 Winter Olympics – BBC Creative, BBC Sport, BlinkInk, Gas Music (BBC)
Director – Comedy Drama/Situation Comedy	Director – Documentary/Factual & Non Drama
**Alma's Not Normal – Andrew Chaplin (BBC Two)**; Big Boys – Jim Archer (Channel 4); Sex Education – Ben Taylor (Netflix)	**Exposure: "Fearless: The Women Fighting Putin" – Sarah Collinson (ITV)**; Jeremy Kyle Show: Death on Daytime – Kira Phillips (Channel 4); Big Oil Vs the World: Denial Mongoose – Jane McMullen (BBC Two)
Director – Drama	Director – Multicamera
**This Is Going to Hurt – Lucy Forbes (BBC One / AMC)**; Landscapers – Will Sharpe (Sky Atlantic); Help – Marc Munden (Channel 4)	**Platinum Party at the Palace – Julia Knowles (BBC)**; The Earthshot Prize 2021 – Julia Knowles (BBC); An Audience with Adele – Liz Clare (ITV)
Editing – Documentary/Factual	Editing – Drama
**9/11: Life Under Attack – Bruce Law, David Pearson & Bumble Bee Post Team (ITV)**; Bling Ring: Hollywood Heist – Alec Rossiter, John McNamee (Channel 4 / Netflix); Terms & Conditions: Deeper Than Drill – Kazeem Manzur (YouTube Originals)	**Derry Girls – Lucien Clayton (Channel 4)**; Marriage – Simon Reglar (BBC One); Anne – Kim Gaster (ITV)
Editing – Entertainment and Comedy	Editing – Sport
**Cheaters – Paul Dingwall (BBC One)**; Sex Education – David Webb, Steve Ackroyd, Phil Hignett, Izabella Curry (Netflix); Top Gear – Robin Nurse (BBC Two)	**Commonwealth Games Opening Ceremony Opener: "Our Birmingham: A Brummie Story" – Nicholas Perry, Philip Hughes (BBC Sport)**; The Tokyo 2020 Paralympics: Beatbox Film – Scott Ferry-Collins and Whisper (Channel 4); Wimbledon 2022: "Women's Final Opening Film" – Nicholas Perry, Alex Ewing, Lucy Adams, BBC Sport Production Team (BBC Sport)
Effects	Picture Enhancement
**The Lazarus Project – Vine FX & Real SFX (Sky Max)**; Prehistoric Planet – MPC Team (Apple TV+); Dodger – Jim Solan, Ant Campbell, Chris Powell, Luke Wenmouth (CBBC)	**Landscapers – Thomas Urbye (Sky Atlantic)**; The Tourist – Dan Coles (BBC One / HBO Max); Our Great National Parks – Dan Gill, James Beynon (Netflix)
Lighting for Multicamera	Multicamera Work
**Platinum Party at the Palace – Nigel Catmur (BBC)**; Concert for Ukraine – Tim Routledge (ITV); The BRIT Awards – Tom Sutherland (ITV)	**Michael McIntyre's The Wheel – Chris Power and the Camera Team (BBC One)**; SAS: Who Dares Wins – Camera Team (Channel 4); An Audience with Adele – Liz Clare, Nat Hill, Dan Studley, Camera Team (ITV)
Make Up Design – Drama	Make Up Design – Entertainment & Non Drama
**Gentleman Jack – Lin Davie, Sue Newbould, Laura Flynn (BBC One / HBO)**; Sherwood – Nadia El-Saffar (BBC One); Landscapers – Julie Kendrick (Sky Atlantic)	**Strictly Come Dancing – Lisa Armstrong, Lisa Davey (BBC One)**; RuPaul's Drag Race: UK vs the World – David Petruschin, Julie Cooper, Sam Greenwood (BBC Three); Inside No. 9 – Nicola Coleman (BBC Two)
Music – Original Score	Music – Original Title
**Mood – Nicôle Lecky, Bryan Senti (BBC Three)**; The Baby – Lucrecia Dalt (Sky Atlantic); Bad Sisters – Tim Phillips, PJ Harvey (Apple TV+)	**The Rising – Carly Paradis (Sky Max)**; Slow Horses – Mick Jagger, Daniel Pemberton (Apple TV+); Bad Sisters – Tim Phillips, PJ Harvey (Apple TV+)
Photography – Documentary/Factual & Non Drama	Photography – Drama & Comedy
**The Green Planet – Tim Shepherd, Todd Kewley, Oliver Mueller, Camera Team (BBC One)**; Murder in the Valleys – Tom Barrow (Sky Crime); Dynasties: "Puma" – John Shier (BBC One)	**Landscapers – Erik Wilson (Sky Atlantic)**; The Tourist – Ben Wheeler (BBC One / HBO Max); Becoming Elizabeth – Adolpho Veloso (Starz)
Production Design – Drama	Production Design – Entertainment & Non Drama
**Landscapers – Cristina Casali, Robert Wischhusen-Hayes, Fabrice Spelta (Sky Atlantic)**; Derry Girls – Nicola Moroney (Channel 4); The Last Kingdom – Dominic Hyman (Netflix)	**Ant & Dec's Saturday Night Takeaway – Catherine Land (ITV)**; Prehistoric Planet – MPC Team (Apple TV+); The Bambers: Murder at the Farm – John Jobe Reynolds (Sky)
Sound – Drama	Sound – Entertainment & Non Drama
**This Is Going to Hurt – Steve Browell, Nina Rice, Jamie Selway, Adam Horley (BBC One / AMC)**; The Tourist – Paul Cotterel, Paul Carter, Des Kenneally (BBC One / HBO Max); A Discovery of Witches – Sound Team (Sky One)	**Chernobyl: The Lost Tapes – Nick Fry, James Spooner, James Jones (Sky Documentaries / HBO Max)**; Trying – David Lascelles (Apple TV+); Trainwreck: Woodstock '99 – Nas Parkash, Will Chapman, Tristan Powell, Claire Ellis (Netflix)
RTS Special Award	RTS Outstanding Contribution Award
**Surian Fletcher-Jones**	**Claire Popplewell and the BBC Studios Events Team**

=== 2021 ===
The RTS Craft & Design Awards 2021 were presented on 22 November 2021 at London Hilton on Park Lane, London. It was hosted by British presenter and journalist Charlene White. The nominees were announced on 11 March 2021.

Costume Design - Drama	Costume Design - Entertainment & Non Drama
**Brave New World – Susie Coulthard (Sky One)**; His Dark Materials – Caroline McCall (BBC One / HBO); The Serpent: "Episodes Five - Eight" – Rachel Walsh (BBC One)	**Inside No. 9 – Yves Barre (BBC Two)**; The Masked Singer – Tim Simpson, Daniel Nettleton, Claire Horton, Derek McLean (ITV); Urban Myths: "Les Dawson's Parisienne Adventure" – Yves Barre (Sky Arts)
Design - Programme Content Sequences	Design - Titles
**9/11: Inside the President's War Room – Miles Donovan, Pete Mellor, Chris Sayer (BBC One / Apple TV+)**; Flooded Tombs of the Nile – Revenant (National Geographic); Searching for Secrets – Bigger Bang VFX (Smithsonian Channel)	**Roald & Beatrix: The Tail of the Curious Mouse – Peter Anderson Studio (Sky One)**; Inside America's Secret Missions – Revenant (National Geographic); Murder They Hope – Liquid TV (Gold)
Design - Trails & Packaging	Casting Award
**Lions Series: South Africa 2021 – Sky Creative, gotgotneed, Coffee & TV (Sky Sports)**; Sky History Idents – Sky Creative (Sky History); Woman's Hour: "Expect the Unexpected" – Claire Grey, Devon Short, Jon Turner (BBC Creative)	**Industry – Julie Harkin, Rae Hendrie (BBC Two / HBO)**; We Are Lady Parts – Aisha Bywaters (Channel 4); The Pembrokeshire Murders – Louise Cross (ITV)
Director - Comedy Drama/Situation Comedy	Director - Documentary/Factual & Non Drama
**Feel Good – Luke Snellin (Netflix)**; Back to Life – Ella Jones (BBC One); Ghosts – Tom Kingsley (BBC One)	**9/11: Inside the President's War Room – Adam Wishart (BBC One / Apple TV+)**; Exposure: "America's War on Abortion" – Deeyah Khan (ITV); The Detectives: Fighting Organised Crime – Benedict Sanderson (BBC Two)
Director - Drama	Director - Multicamera
**It's a Sin – Peter Hoar (Channel 4 / HBO Max)**; Small Axe – Steve McQueen (BBC One); Time – Lewis Arnold (BBC One)	**Glastonbury Festival: Live at Worthy Farm – Paul Dugdale (BBC)**; The Funeral of HRH The Prince Philip, Duke of Edinburgh – Julia Knowles, Nikki Parsons, Helen Scott, Simon Staffurth (BBC One); Royal British Legion Festival of Remembrance – Bridget Caldwell (BBC One)
Editing - Documentary/Factual	Editing - Drama
**The Detectives: Fighting Organised Crime – Sam Bergson, Brad Manning, Otto Burnham (BBC Two)**; Doctors of War: Saving Lives – Eddie Haselden (Channel 5); Uprising – Brett Irwin, Esther Gimenez (BBC One)	**It's a Sin – Sarah Brewerton (Channel 4 / HBO Max)**; The Third Day: "Sunday – The Ghost" – Dan Roberts (Sky Atlantic / HBO); Time – Sacha Szwarc (BBC One)
Editing - Entertainment and Comedy	Editing - Sport
**We Are Lady Parts – Robbie Morrison (Channel 4)**; Ghosts – Mike Holliday, Will Peverett (BBC One); Frank of Ireland – Steve Ackroyd (Channel 4)	**BT Sport Champions League Final 2021: "Closing Music Sequence with London Grammar" – Mike Osborne, Kevin Evans, Liam Scarlino (BT Sport)**; BBC Sport 2020 Tokyo Closer – Nicholas Perry, Tom Butt (BBC Sport); Top Gun: Maverick Promo for The British Grand Prix: C4F1 – Robin Nurse and The Whisper Production Team (Channel 4)
Effects	Picture Enhancement
**Brave New World – Thomas Horton, Josie Henwood, Scott Pritchard, Alex Maldonado (Sky One)**; His Dark Materials – Effects Team (BBC One / HBO); The Serpent – Vine VFX (BBC One)	**Earth At Night In Color – Nulight Studios, Adam Inglis, Tom Payne (Apple TV+)**; The Serpent – Perry Gibbs (BBC One); 9/11: Inside the President's War Room – Dan Gill (BBC One / Apple TV+)
Lighting for Multicamera	Multicamera Work
**The Ranganation – Gurdip Mahal (BBC Two)**; Jools' Annual Hootenanny – Chris Rigby (BBC Two); The Graham Norton Show – Chris Rigby (BBC One)	**SAS: Who Dares Wins – Camera Team (Channel 4)**; Glastonbury Festival: Live at Worthy Farm – Driift, Paul Dugdale, Camera Team (BBC); The Ranganation – Chris Miller (BBC Two)
Make Up Design - Drama	Make Up Design - Entertainment & Non Drama
**The Watch – Amanda Ross-McDonald, Clinton Smith, Ashley Powell (BBC Two)**; His Dark Materials – Jacqueline Fowler (BBC One / HBO); Stephen – Nora Robertson (ITV)	**We Are Lady Parts – Claire Carter (Channel 4)**; Famalam – Nicola Coleman (BBC Three)
Music - Original Score	Music - Original Title
**Uprising – Harry Escott (BBC One)**; The Third Day – Cristobal Tapia de Veer (Sky Atlantic / HBO); The Beast Must Die – Matthew Herbert (BritBox)	**The Beast Must Die – Matthew Herbert (BritBox)**; Devil Among Us – Darren Francis (Investigation Discovery); The Pembrokeshire Murders – Carly Paradis (ITV)
Photography - Documentary/Factual & Non Drama	Photography - Drama & Comedy
**ITV News at Ten – Mark Davey (ITV)**; The Year Earth Changed – Camera Team (Apple TV+); Ian Wright: Home Truths – Daniel Dewsbury, Patrick Smith (BBC One)	**Industry – Milos Moore (BBC Two / HBO)**; We Are Lady Parts – Diana Olifirova (Channel 4); A Discovery of Witches – Adam Etherington (Sky One)
Production Design - Drama	Production Design - Entertainment & Non Drama
**It's a Sin – Luana Hanson (Channel 4 / HBO Max)**; All Creatures Great and Small – Jacqueline Smith (Channel 5); His Dark Materials – Joel Collins (BBC One / HBO)	**We Are Lady Parts – Simon Walker (Channel 4)**; Delia Derbyshire: The Myths and the Legendary Tapes – Felicity Hickson (BBC Four); Apocalypse Wow – Patrick Watson (ITV2)
Sound - Drama	Sound - Entertainment & Non Drama
**Worzel Gummidge: "Saucy Nancy" – Tom Corbett, Oscar Bloomfield-Crowe, Darren McQuade, Ivor Talbot (BBC One)**; The Spanish Princess – Sound Team (StarzPlay); The Third Day – Nigel Albermaniche, Niv Adiri, Jules Woods (Sky Atlantic / HBO)	**Formula 1: Drive to Survive – Steve Speed, Nick Fry, James Evans, Hugh Dwan (Netflix)**; Earth At Night In Color – Kate Hopkins, Graham Wild, Paul Ackerman (Apple TV+); Life in a Day 2020 – Sound Team (YouTube)
RTS Special Award	Outstanding Achievement Award
**I'm a Celebrity...Get Me Out of Here! (ITV)**	**Sally Debonnaire**

=== 2020 ===
The RTS Craft & Design Awards 2020 were presented on 23 November 2020 on the RTS website. The nominations were announced on 4 November 2020.

Costume Design - Drama	Costume Design - Entertainment & Non Drama
**I May Destroy You – Lynsey Moore (BBC One / HBO)**; Noughts + Crosses – Dihantus Engelbrecht (BBC One); A Suitable Boy – Arjun Bhasin (BBC One)	**The Masked Singer – Tim Simpson, Derek McLean, Daniel Nettleton, Claire Horton (ITV)**; The Goes Wrong Show – Roberto Surace (BBC One); In the Long Run – Amanda Monk (Sky One)
Design - Programme Content Sequences	Design - Titles
**My World: Dadaab Refugee Camp – Made in Colour (BBC World)**; The Supervet – Richard Norley and Wajahut Shah, Sancha Worthington (Channel 4); Mars: One Day on the Red Planet – Martin Johnson, Fleur Bone, Rob Harvey, Paul Crosby (National Geographic)	**His Dark Materials – Titles Team (BBC One / HBO)**; Brassic – Titles Team (Sky One); World Athletics Championships 2019 – Rob Roberts-Facey, Lucy Adams, Dominic Robson-Smith, Alastair McIntyre (BBC Sport)
Director - Comedy Drama/Situation Comedy	Director - Documentary/Factual & Non Drama
**Enterprice – Ella Jones (BBC Three)**; There She Goes – Simon Hynd (BBC Two); This Country – Tom George (BBC Three)	**For Sama – Waad al-Kateab, Edward Watts (Channel 4 / PBS)**; Once Upon a Time in Iraq – James Bluemel (BBC Two); Prison – Paddy Wivell (Channel 4)
Director - Drama	Director - Multicamera
**Normal People – Lenny Abrahamson (BBC Three / Hulu)**; I May Destroy You – Sam Miller, Michaela Coel (BBC One / HBO); The End of the F***ing World – Destiny Ekaragha (Channel 4 / Netflix)	**Royal British Legion Festival of Remembrance – Bridget Caldwell (BBC One)**; VE Day 75: The People's Celebration – Simon Staffurth (BBC One); VJ Day 75: The Nation's Tribute – Julia Knowles (BBC One)
Casting Award	Editing - Documentary/Factual
**Giri/Haji – Yoko Narahashi, Shaheen Baig, Layla Merrick-Wolf (BBC Two / Netflix)**; Gangs of London – Kelly Valentine-Hendry (Sky Atlantic); White House Farm – Amy Hubbard (ITV)	**Tyson Fury: The Gypsy King – Abraham Teweldebrhan, Nic Zimmermann, Gareth Williams (ITV)**; For Sama – Chloë Lambourne, Simon McMahon (Channel 4 / PBS); Barrymore: The Body in the Pool – Justin Badger, Christopher Swayne (Channel 4)
Editing - Drama	Editing - Entertainment and Comedy
**Quiz – Pia Di Ciaula (ITV)**; I Hate Suzie – Izabella Curry (Sky Atlantic); Normal People – Nathan Nugent (BBC Three / Hulu)	**Staged – Dan Gage (BBC One)**; Britain's Got Talent – Edit Team (ITV); Feel Good – William Webb (Netflix / Channel 4)
Editing - Sport
**Time for a new season BT Sport Europa League final & BT Sport Champions League final – Joe Snell, Kevin Evans, Paul Roberts (BT Sport)**; One Day: Sport's Super Sunday – Nicholas Perry, Rob Roberts-Facey, Stephen Lyle (BBC Sport); Six Nations 2020: "Eddie Jones interview" – Nicholas Perry, Tom Mallion, Sonja McLaughlan, Richard Hughes (BBC Sport)
Effects	Picture Enhancement
**His Dark Materials – Framestore, Russell Dodgson, Dan May, Danny Hargreaves (BBC One / HBO)**; War of the Worlds – Vine FX (Fox); World on Fire – DNEG, Rowley SFX, Flash SFX, Goldcrest (BBC One)	**Rise of the Nazis – Adam Dolniak (BBC Two)**; Devs – Asa Shoul (FX on Hulu); Catherine the Great – Aidan Farrell (Sky Atlantic / HBO)
Make Up Design - Drama	Make Up Design - Entertainment & Non Drama
**A Suitable Boy – Shabana Latif, Avan Contractor (BBC One)**; I May Destroy You – Bethany Swan (BBC One / HBO); Quiz – Julie Kendrick (ITV)	**Frayed – Sheldon Wade (Sky One)**; In My Skin – Kate Roberts & Team (BBC Three); Dancing on Ice – Marcos Gurgel (ITV)
Lighting for Multicamera	Multicamera Work
**VJ Day 75: The Nation's Tribute – Nigel Catmur (BBC One)**; Crazy Delicious – Gurdip Mahal, Ross Williams, Rob Bradley (Channel 4); Coronation Street – Paul Burton (ITV)	**Performance Live: The Way Out – Suri Krishnamma & Camera Team (BBC Four)**; VJ Day 75: The Nation's Tribute – Camera Team (BBC One); 24 Hours in Police Custody: "Murder in the Woods Part One & Two" – Andrew Slater, Annie Tetchner, Sophie Oliver, Katie Collis (Channel 4)
Multicamera Work - Sport
**2019 Rugby World Cup: "Semi Final - England v New Zealand" – IGBS Camera Team (ITV)**; **SailGP: "Season 1 Finale" and "Season 2 Launch" – Matt Roberts (BT Sport / Sky Sports)**; FA Cup: "Shrewsbury Town v Liverpool" – Ken Burton (BBC Sport)
Music - Original Score	Music - Original Title
**For Sama – Nainita Desai (Channel 4 / PBS)**; Deadwater Fell – Natalie Holt (Channel 4); Enterprice – Mark "Happi" Babatunde, Duriel "Komenz" Mensah (BBC Three)	**Baghdad Central – H. Scott Salinas (Channel 4)**; His Dark Materials – Lorne Balfe (BBC One / HBO); A Suitable Boy – Alex Heffes, Anoushka Shankar (BBC One)
Photography - Documentary/Factual & Non Drama	Photography - Drama & Comedy
**Storyville: "On the President's Orders" – Olivier Sarbil (BBC Four)**; The Great Mountain Sheep Gather – Drone Filming Crew (BBC Four); Celebrity SAS: Who Dares Wins – Camera Team (Channel 4)	**Normal People – Suzie Lavelle (BBC Three / Hulu)**; Little Birds – Ed Rutherford (Sky Atlantic); Giri/Haji – David Odd (BBC Two)
Production Design - Drama	Production Design - Entertainment & Non Drama
**His Dark Materials – Joel Collins (BBC One / HBO)**; Catherine the Great – Tom Burton (Sky Atlantic / HBO); Gangs of London – Matthew Gant, Megan Bosaw (Sky Atlantic)	**The Goes Wrong Show – Dennis De Groot (BBC One)**; Taskmaster – James Dillon (Dave); Strictly Come Dancing – Catherine Land, Patrick Doherty (BBC One)
Sound - Drama	Sound - Entertainment & Non Drama
**Baghdad Central – Howard Bargroff, Tim Barker, Steve Browell, Marc Specter (Channel 4)**; The Salisbury Poisonings – Paul Davies, Chris Durfy, Nick Cox, Ian Morgan (BBC One); The Crown – Sound Team (Netflix)	**The Last Igloo – Nick Fry, Mick Duffield, James Evans (BBC Four)**; VJ Day 75: The Nation's Tribute – Kevin Duff, Andy Deacon (BBC One); Formula 1: Drive to Survive – Steve Speed, Nick Fry, James Evans, Hugh Dwan (Netflix)
RTS Special Award	Outstanding Achievement Award
**Michaela Coel – I May Destroy You (BBC One / HBO)**	**Nina Gold**

=== 2019 ===
The RTS Craft & Design Awards 2019 were presented on 25 November 2019 at London Hilton on Park Lane, London. It was hosted by British comedian Ahir Shah. The nominations were announced on 7 November 2019.

Costume Design - Drama	Costume Design - Entertainment & Non Drama
**Chernobyl – Odile Dicks-Mireaux (Sky Atlantic / HBO)**; Gentleman Jack – Tom Pye, Nadine Clifford-Davern (BBC One / HBO); The Long Song – Charlotte Holdich (BBC One)	**Don't Forget the Driver – Sam Perry (BBC Two)**; Brassic – Orla Smyth-Mill (Sky One); Strictly Come Dancing – Vicky Gill (BBC One)
Design - Programme Content Sequences	Design - Titles
**Black Earth Rising – Studio AKA, Steve Small, Nikki Kefford, Artworking, Animation Team (BBC Two)**; The Planets – BBC Studios with Lola Post Production (BBC Two); Newsround: "Holocaust: Finding My Family" – Made in Colour (CBBC)	**Killing Eve – Matt Willey (BBC One)**; The Cry – D8 (BBC One); The ABC Murders – Ben Hanbury, Hugo Moss, Paul McDonnell, Tamsin McGee (BBC One)
Design - Trails & Packaging	Director - Comedy Drama/Situation Comedy
**FIFA Women's World Cup 2019 – BBC Sport, BBC Creative, Park Pictures (BBC Sport)**; BBC Two Rebrand – BBC Creative (BBC Two); Dynasties – Nick Meikle, Sarah Gerona, Laura Whittell, Natalie Fox (BBC One)	**Enterprice – Nida Manzoor (BBC Three)**; Ghosts – Tom Kingsley (BBC One); This Way Up – Alex Winckler (Channel 4)
Director - Documentary/Factual & Non Drama	Director – Drama
**David Harewood: Psychosis and Me – Wendie Ottewill (BBC Two)**; War in the Blood – Arthur Cary (BBC Two); 8 Days: To the Moon and Back – Anthony Philipson (BBC Two)	**The Virtues – Shane Meadows (Channel 4)**; Brexit: The Uncivil War – Toby Haynes (Channel 4); Chernobyl – Johan Renck (Sky Atlantic / HBO)
Director - Multicamera	Editing - Documentary/Factual
**Royal British Legion Festival of Remembrance – Bridget Caldwell (BBC One)**; Not Going Out – Nick Wood (BBC One); Jazz 625 Live: For One Night Only – Marcus Viner (BBC Four)	**Egon Schiele: Dangerous Desires – Claire Guillon (BBC Two)**; 100 Vaginas – Sunshine Jackson (Channel 4); Sacred Wonders – John Steventon, Ed Horne (BBC One)
Editing - Drama	Editing - Entertainment and Comedy
**The Virtues – Matthew Gray (Channel 4)**; Killing Eve – Gary Dollner (BBC One); Brexit: The Uncivil War – Matthew Cannings (Channel 4)	**The Heist – Simon Whitcomb, Christine Pancott (Sky One)**; Ghosts – Mike Holliday (BBC One); Don't Forget the Driver – Tom Hemmings (BBC Two)
Editing - Sport
**UEFA Champions League Final: "Official Film" – Lukas Musil, David Snowdon (UEFA / BT Sport)**; Women's World Cup – Joe Snell, Tim-Mackenzie Smith, Jay Gill, Pete Burton, Frank Callaghan (BBC Sport); Road to Madrid 2019: BT Sport x Wretch 32: "UEFA Champions League Final" – Kevin Evans, Joe Snell, Jordan Buckingham, Ian Grech (BT Sport)
Effects	Picture Enhancement
**The OA – One of Us (Netflix)**; Les Misérables – Effects Team (BBC One); Happy! – Axis Studios (Syfy)	**Brassic – Matt Brown (Sky One)**; The Mighty Redcar – Dan Gill (BBC Two); Summer of Rockets – Aidan Farrell (BBC Two)
Lighting for Multicamera	Multicamera Work
**Glastonbury: "Stormzy" – Tim Routledge (BBC)**; CHRIS: Live from the Salle De Pleyel – Tim Routledge (Apple Music); Royal British Legion Festival of Remembrance – Nigel Catmur (BBC One)	**Master of Photography – Giuseppe Bianchi (Sky Arts)**; Taylor Swift: Reputation Stadium Tour – Paul Dugdale, Simon Fisher (Netflix); Royal British Legion Festival of Remembrance – Camera Team (BBC One)
Multicamera Work - Sport
**SailGP – Rhys Edwards, Matt Roberts, Laura McManamon (BT Sport)**; Six Nations: "Wales v England" – Matthew Griffiths (BBC One); Wimbledon 2019: "Men's Final" – Andrew Clement (BBC)
Make Up Design - Drama	Make Up Design - Entertainment & Non Drama
**Chernobyl – Daniel Parker (Sky Atlantic / HBO)**; Gentleman Jack – Lin Davie (BBC One / HBO); The Durrells – Meinir Jones-Lewis (ITV)	**Strictly Come Dancing – Lisa Armstrong (BBC One)**; Don't Forget the Driver – Bean Ellis (BBC Two); Year of the Rabbit – Jo Jenkins (Channel 4)
Music - Original Score	Music - Original Title
**Chernobyl – Hildur Guðnadóttir (Sky Atlantic / HBO)**; Years and Years – Murray Gold (BBC One); Fleabag – Isobel Waller-Bridge (BBC Two)	**The Bay – Samuel Sim (ITV)**; The Cry – Lorne Balfe (BBC One); Extraordinary Rituals – Nainita Desai (BBC Two)
Photography - Documentary/Factual & Non Drama	Photography - Drama & Comedy
**The Mighty Redcar – Daniel Dewsbury, Stuart Bernard, Jonny Ashton (BBC Two)**; Dynasties: "Emperor" – Lindsay McCrae (BBC One); The Last Survivors – Arthur Cary, Johann Perry (BBC Two)	**Chernobyl – Jakob Ihre (Sky Atlantic / HBO)**; The Long Song – Chloë Thomson (BBC One); I Am Kirsty – Stuart Bentley (Channel 4)
Production Design - Drama	Production Design - Entertainment & Non Drama
**Chernobyl – Luke Hull, Clare Levinson-Gendler (Sky Atlantic / HBO)**; Killing Eve – Kristian Milsted (BBC One); The Little Drummer Girl – Maria Djurkovic, Tatiana Macdonald (BBC One)	**Michael McIntyre's Big Show – Dominic Tolfts (BBC One)**; This Time with Alan Partridge – Richard Drew (BBC One); Year of the Rabbit – Samantha Harley (Channel 4)
Sound - Drama	Sound - Entertainment & Non Drama
**Chernobyl – Stefan Henrix, Stuart Hilliker, Joe Beal, Harry Barnes, Michael Maroussas (Sky Atlantic / HBO)**; Pure – Ronald Bailey, James Ridgway, Rodney Berling, Robert Brazier, Chris Roberts (Channel 4); Black Earth Rising – Nigel Edwards, Glen Marullo, Lee Critchlow, Linda Murdoch (BBC Two)	**Married to a Paedophile – Greg Gettens, Kim Tae Hak, Chad Orororo, Andy Paddon (Channel 4)**; 8 Days: To the Moon and Back – Ben Ormerod, Marc Wojtanowski, Duncan Paterson (BBC Two); Inside No. 9: "Dead Line" – Christian Henson, Paul Freeman, Kevin Paice, Adam Tandy (BBC Two)
RTS Special Award	Lifetime Achievement Award
**Sky AdSmart**	**Michael McCarthy**

=== 2018 ===
The RTS Craft & Design Awards 2018 were presented on 26 November 2018 at London Hilton on Park Lane, London. It was hosted by English comedian Tom Allen. The nominations were announced on 9 November 2018.

Costume Design - Drama	Costume Design - Entertainment & Non Drama
**The City and the City – (BBC Two)**; King Lear – Fotini Dimou (BBC Two); The Miniaturist – Joanna Eatwell (BBC One)	**The Windsors Royal Wedding Special – June Nevin (Channel 4)**; The Keith & Paddy Picture Show – Heather MacVean (ITV); Zapped – Howard Burden (Dave)
Design - Programme Content Sequences	Design - Titles
**Kiss Me First – Axis Animation (Channel 4 / Netflix)**; Newsround: "Empire Windrush" – Made in Colour (CBBC); One Strange Rock – Moonraker Visual Effects Team (National Geographic)	**Deep State – Sasan Roohi, Amber Sutera, Peter Aldridge, Michael Pearson (Fox)**; Ordeal by Innocence – Ben Hanbury, Hugo Moss, Paul McDonnell, Tamsin McGee (BBC One); Philip K. Dick's Electric Dreams – Nic Benns, Miki Kato, Karl Watkins, Svenja Frahm (Channel 4)
Design - Trails & Packaging	Director - Comedy Drama/Situation Comedy
**2018 FIFA World Cup Russia – BBC Sport, BBC Creative, Blinkink (BBC)**; The 2018 Winter Olympics – BBC Sport, Y&R and Nexus Studios (BBC)	**Derry Girls – Michael Lennox (Channel 4)**; The Windsors Royal Wedding Special – Adam Miller (Channel 4); GameFace – Andrew Chaplin (E4)
Director - Documentary/Factual & Non Drama	Director - Drama
**White Right: Meeting the Enemy – Deeyah Khan (ITV)**; Arena: "Stanley and His Daughters" – Francis Hanly (BBC Four); Stephen: The Murder that Changed a Nation – James Rogan (BBC One)	**A Very English Scandal – Stephen Frears (BBC One)**; The End of the F***ing World – Jonathan Entwistle (Channel 4 / Netflix); Save Me – Nick Murphy (Sky Atlantic)
Director - Multicamera	Editing - Documentary/Factual
**Strictly Come Dancing – Nikki Parsons (BBC One)**; Coronation Street – David Kester (ITV); The Voice UK – Liz Clare (BBC One)	**The Detectives: Murder on the Streets – Paul Carlin, Paul Dosaj, Kevin Konak (BBC Two)**; Grenfell – Ben Brown (BBC One); Blue Planet II – Production Team (BBC One)
Editing - Drama	Editing - Entertainment and Comedy
**Come Home – Adam Trotman (BBC One)**; The End of the F***ing World – Mike Jones (Channel 4 / Netflix); A Very English Scandal – Pia Di Ciaula (BBC One)	**The Windsors Royal Wedding Special – Mark Williams (Channel 4)**; Derry Girls – Lucien Clayton (Channel 4); GameFace – Charlie Fawcett (E4)
Editing - Sport
**Champions League Final Liverpool v Real Madrid: "Opening Music Sequence" – Ian Grech, Mike Carter, Kevin Evans (BT Sport)**; Winter Olympics – Nicholas Perry, David Bouchard, John Nicholson (BBC); Monaco Grand Prix Feature / Formula 1 2018 – Scott Ferry-Collins, Jim Wiseman, Tim Hampel (Channel 4)
Effects	Picture Enhancement
**The Crown – One Of Us, Chris Reynolds (Netflix)**; One Strange Rock – Moonraker Visual Effects Team (National Geographic); Katy – Tanvir Hanif, Fifth Wall VFX, Becci Blood (CBBC)	**The UN Sex Abuse Scandal – Adam Dolniak (Channel 4)**; Flowers – Dan Coles (Channel 4); King Lear – Gareth Spensley (BBC Two)
Lighting for Multicamera	Multicamera Work
**Upstart Crow – Martin Kempton (BBC Two)**; Britain's Got Talent – Dave Davey (ITV); Royal British Legion Festival of Remembrance – Nigel Catmur (BBC One)	**The Royal Wedding: Prince Harry and Meghan Markle – Camera Team (BBC One)**; Not Going Out – Nick Wood and the Camera Team (BBC One); Upstart Crow – Richard Boden, Barbara Hicks, Tony Keene (BBC Two)
Multicamera Work - Sport
**The London Marathon – Micky Payne (BBC)**; BDO World Darts Championships – Simon Wheeler (Channel 4)
Make Up Design - Drama	Make Up Design - Entertainment & Non Drama
**King Lear – Naomi Donne (BBC Two)**; A Very English Scandal – Daniel Phillips (BBC One); Flowers – Sjaan Gillings (Channel 4)	**Urban Myths: "The Dalí and the Cooper" – Vanessa White (Sky Arts)**; The Windsors Royal Wedding Special – Lulu Hall (Channel 4); Tracey Breaks the News – Vanessa White, Floris Schuller, Neill Gorton (BBC One)
Music - Original Score	Music - Original Title
**A Very English Scandal – Murray Gold (BBC One)**; The End of the F***ing World – Graham Coxon (Channel 4 / Netflix); Civilisations – Tandis Jenhudson (BBC Two)	**Motherland – Oli Julian (BBC Two)**; Come Home – Murray Gold (BBC One); Civilisations – Tandis Jenhudson (BBC Two)
Photography - Documentary/Factual & Non Drama	Photography - Drama & Comedy
**Retreat: Meditations from a Monastery – Andrew Muggleton (BBC Four)**; Blue Planet II – Camera Team (BBC One); Handmade in Hull – Glen Milner (BBC Four)	The End of the F***ing World – Justin Brown (Channel 4 / Netflix); Peaky Blinders – Cathal Watters (BBC Two); Hidden – Stuart Biddlecombe (S4C / BBC Four)
Production Design - Drama	Production Design - Entertainment & Non Drama
**The City and the City – Simon Rogers (BBC Two)**; The Crown – Martin Childs, Alison Harvey (Netflix); Gunpowder – Grant Montgomery (BBC One)	**Britain's Got Talent – Peter Bingemann (ITV)**; Zapped – Dave Ferris (Dave); Love Island – Production Design Team (ITV2)
Sound - Drama	Sound - Entertainment & Non Drama
**Bodyguard – Dan Johnson, Simon Farmer, Jamie Caple, Mark Lawes (BBC One)**; Deep State – Dylan Voigt, Nigel Edwards, Ben Norrington, Seb Shorter (Fox); Patrick Melrose – Nigel Squibbs, John Mooney, Filipa Principe, Tony Gibson (Sky Atlantic)	**Retreat: Meditations from a Monastery – Doug Dreger, Greg Gettens, Kim Tae Hak (BBC Four)**; Top Gear – Andy Hodges, Sam Staples, Renato Ferrari (BBC Two); BBC Proms 2018 – The Sound Alliance (BBC Two / BBC Four)
Lifetime Achievement Award
**Kathy Schulz**

=== 2017 ===
The RTS Craft & Design Awards 2017 were presented on 27 November 2017 at London Hilton on Park Lane, London. The nominations were announced on 7 November 2017.

Costume Design - Drama	Costume Design - Entertainment and Non Drama
**Taboo – Joanna Eatwell (BBC One / FX)**; Victoria – Rosalind Ebbutt (ITV); Guerrilla – James Keast (Sky Atlantic)	**White Gold – Caroline Pitcher (BBC Two)**; Strictly Come Dancing – Vicky Gill & The Costume Team (BBC One); The Keith & Paddy Picture Show – Heather MacVean (ITV)
Design - Programme Content Sequences	Design - Titles
**Newsround: "Finding My Family - Partition" – Made in Colour (CBBC)**; Newsround: "Inside My Head: Taking Control of My Anxiety" – Made in Colour (CBBC); The Marvellous World of Roald Dahl – Marc Knapton, The Brewery (BBC Two)	**Fearless – Hugo Moss, Paul McDonnell, Ben Hanbury (ITV)**; Broken – Patrick Hall (BBC One); The Durrells – Alex MacLean (ITV)
Design - Trails & Packaging	Director - Comedy Drama / Situation Comedy
**Film Fear – Rob Heath, John Cryer, Shizuka Hata, Rachel Warr (Film4)**; Taboo – BBC Marketing Team (BBC One / FX); Channel 4 F1 2016: "Mexican F1 Grand Prix" – Richard Gort, Julian Gibbs, Reuben Armstrong, The Intro Team (Channel 4)	**White Gold – Damon Beesley (BBC Two)**; Peter Kay's Car Share – Peter Kay (BBC One); Chewing Gum – Tom Marshall (E4)
Director - Documentary/Factual & Non Drama	Director - Drama
**Frontline: "Last Days of Solitary" – Dan Edge, Lauren Mucciolo (BBC Four)**; American Justice – Arthur Cary, Jonathan Taylor (BBC Two); American High School – Marcus Plowright (BBC Three)	**The Witness for the Prosecution – Julian Jarrold (BBC One)**; Three Girls – Philippa Lowthorpe (BBC One); Damilola, Our Loved Boy – Euros Lyn (BBC One)
Editing - Documentary / Factual	Editing - Drama
**Bring Me Back to Life – Sam Santana (Channel 4)**; The Trial: A Murder in the Family – Editing Team (Channel 4); Planet Earth II – Production Team (BBC One)	**Three Girls – Úna Ní Dhonghaíle (BBC One)**; Broken – Patrick Hall (BBC One); Murdered for Being Different – Johnny Rayner (BBC Three)
Editing - Entertainment and Comedy	Editing - Sport
**Love Island – Editing Team (ITV2)**; Peter Kay's Car Share – Matt Brown (BBC One); White Gold – William Webb (BBC Two)	**UEFA Champions League: "2017 Final: Real Madrid v Juventus" – Matt Roberts, Kevin Evans, Jordan Buckingham, Scott Deaming (BT Sport)**; 2017 UEFA Champions League final – Timothy Lee, Lukas Musil, Marc Connor, James Wilson (BT Sport); Silverstone Grand Prix – Andy Collins (Channel 4)
Effects - Digital	Effects - Special
**The Crown – The Digital Effects Team, One of Us (Netflix)**; The Secrets of Your Food – BDH Creative Digital Effects Team (BBC Two); Black Mirror: "Playtest" – Justin Hutchinson-Chatburn, Framestore, Glassworks, Painting Practice (Netflix)	**Sherlock – Real SFX (BBC One)**; The Crown – Chris Reynolds (Netflix)
Picture Enhancement	Lighting for Multicamera
**Hospital – Dan Gill (BBC Two)**; The Missing – Ross Baker (BBC One); Broken – Patrick Hall (BBC One)	**World War One Remembered: Passchendaele: "For the Fallen" – Nigel Catmur (BBC One / BBC Two)**; Peter Kay's Car Share – Andy Hibbert (BBC One); Let It Shine – Gurdip Mahal, Rob Bradley, Bill Peachment (BBC One)
Make Up Design - Drama	Make Up Design - Entertainment and Non Drama
**Taboo – Erika Okvist, Jan Archibald, Audrey Doyle (BBC One / FX)**; Victoria – Nic Collins (ITV); Murdered for Being Different – Jenna Wrage, Harriet Thompson (BBC Three)	**The Drug Trial: Emergency at the Hospital – Siobhán Harper-Ryan (BBC Two)**; The Windsors: "Christmas Special" and "Serie 2" – Lulu Hall (Channel 4); The Keith & Paddy Picture Show – Nadine O'Toole, Reza Karim (ITV)
Multicamera Work	Multicamera Work - Sport
**One Love Manchester – Richard Valentine, Matt Ingham (BBC One)**; World War One Remembered: Passchendaele – Camera Team (BBC One / BBC Two); Strictly Come Dancing – Camera Team, Nikki Parsons (BBC One)	**2017 IAAF World Athletics Championship – Helen Kuttner, Tim Moses, Mark Dennis & Camera Team (Sunset+Vine)**; The Boat Races 2017 – Pete Andrews, Micky Payne, Bill Morris, Dave White (BBC One); Six Nations: "Wales v England" – Matthew Griffiths, Chrissie Collins, Sam Maynard, Andrew Jackson (BBC One)
Music - Original Score	Music - Original Title
**Damilola, Our Loved Boy – Dru Masters (BBC One)**; The Crown – Rupert Gregson-Williams (Netflix); Three Girls – Natalie Holt (BBC One)	**Victoria – Martin Phipps (ITV)**; SS-GB – Dan Jones (BBC One); Taboo – Max Richter (BBC One / FX)
Photography - Documentary / Factual & Non Drama	Photography - Drama & Comedy
**Planet Earth II – Production Team (BBC One)**; American Justice – Arthur Cary, Jonathan Taylor (BBC Two); Frontline: "Last Days of Solitary" – Dan Edge, Tim Grucza (BBC Four)	**Three Girls – Matt Gray (BBC One)**; Broadchurch – Carlos Catalan (ITV); The State – Gavin Finney (Channel 4)
Production Design - Drama	Production Design - Entertainment & Non Drama
**Black Mirror: "Nosedive" – Joel Collins, James Foster (Netflix)**; Man in an Orange Shirt – Grenville Horner (BBC One); Taboo – Sonja Klaus (BBC One / FX)	**Britain's Got Talent – Florian Wieder (ITV)**; Murder in Successville – Antony Cartlidge (BBC Three); The Windsors: "Christmas Special" and "Serie 2" – Mo Holden (Channel 4)
Sound - Drama	Sound - Entertainment and Non-Drama
**Taboo – Sound Team (BBC One / FX)**; Broken – Brian Nelson, Gary Desmond (BBC One); Sherlock – Sound Team (BBC One)	**World War One Remembered: Passchendaele – Sound Team (BBC One / BBC Two)**; Ambulance – Gary Kelly (BBC One); Planet Earth II – Production Team (BBC One)
Craft and Innovation Award	Judges' Award
**Planet Earth II (BBC One)**	**World War One Remembered: Passchendaele (BBC One / BBC Two)**
Lifetime Achievement Award
**Tony Revell**

=== 2016 ===
The RTS Craft & Design Awards 2016 were presented on 28 November 2016 at London Hilton on Park Lane, London. It was hosted by Danish-British comedian Sandi Toksvig. The nominations were announced on 11 November 2016.

Costume Design - Drama	Costume Design - Entertainment & Non Drama
**The Night Manager – Signe Sejlund (BBC One)**; The Living and the Dead – Phoebe de Gaye (BBC One); The Dresser – Fotini Dimou (BBC Two)	**The Keith Lemon Sketch Show – Heather MacVean (ITV2)**; Hunderby – Claire Finlay-Thompson (Sky Atlantic); Murder in Successville – Lucy Williams (BBC Three)
Design - Programme Content Sequences	Design - Titles
**Newsround: "China: The Left-Behind Children" – Made in Colour (CBBC)**; Formula 1 British Grand Prix – Simon Baker, Diana Elkins, Tamsin Herbert (Channel 4); Newsround: "The Battle of the Somme" – Made in Colour (CBBC)	**The Last Panthers – Miki Kato & Momoco (Sky Atlantic / Canal+)**; 2016 Rio Olympics – Ron Chakraborty, Jonathan Bramley, BBC Sport Marketing Team & RKCR/Y&R (BBC); The Durrells – Alex Maclean (ITV)
Design - Trails & Packaging	Director - Comedy Drama/Situation Comedy
**2016 Rio Olympics – Ron Chakraborty, Jonathan Bramley, BBC Sport Marketing Team & RKCR/Y&R (BBC)**; Channel identity for Olympic Channel – Lambie-Nairn (Olympic Channel); The Rack Pack – Shaun Qureshi (BBC iPlayer)	**People Just Do Nothing – Jack Clough (BBC Three)**; Alan Partridge: Scissored Isle – Rob and Neil Gibbons (Sky Atlantic); Mum – Richard Laxton (BBC Two)
Director - Documentary/Factual & Non Drama	Director - Drama
**Exodus: Our Journey to Europe – James Bluemel (BBC Two)**; The Hunt: The Hardest Challenge – Huw Cordey (BBC One); Life and Deaf – Clare Johns (BBC Four)	**Murdered by My Father – Bruce Goodison (BBC One)**; One Child – John Alexander (BBC Two); And Then There Were None – Craig Viveiros (BBC One)
Editing - Documentary/Factual	Editing - Drama
**Exodus: Our Journey to Europe – Simon Sykes, Nick Fenton, Sunshine Jackson (BBC Two)**; Handmade by Royal Appointment: Steinway & Sons – Alex Elkins (BBC Four); The Prosecutors: Real Crime and Punishment – Gwyn Jones (BBC Four)	**Doctor Foster – Tom Hemmings (BBC One)**; Neil Gaiman's Likely Stories – Adam Biskupski (Sky Arts); The Tunnel: Sabotage – Katie Weiland (Sky Atlantic / Canal+)
Editing - Entertainment and Comedy	Editing - Sport
**Flowers – Selina MacArthur (Channel 4)**; The Rack Pack – Ben Yeates (BBC iPlayer); Fleabag – Gary Dollner (BBC Two)	**Olympics 2016 Opening Ceremony – Nicholas Perry, John Nicholson, Simon Livingstone & BBC Sport Production Team (BBC)**; Ski Sunday 2016 – Dave Horwell and the Editing Team (BBC Two); Formula 1 Monaco Grand Prix Opener – Whisper Films, Channel 4, Matt Loughlin (Channel 4)
Effects - Digital	Effects - Special
**Countdown to Life: The Extraordinary Making of You – BDH Digital Effects Team (BBC Two)**; A Midsummer Night's Dream – Lola Post Production (BBC One); Beowulf: Return to the Shieldlands – Milk Visual Effects (ITV)	**War & Peace – Jens Doeldissen, Darius Cicenas at Film Effects (BBC One)**; The Night Manager – Pau Costa Moeller (BBC One); Doctor Who – Real SFX & Millennium FX (BBC One)
Lighting for Multicamera	Multicamera Work
**The Voice 2016 – Gurdip Mahal, Ross Williams, Rob Bradley (BBC One)**; Upstart Crow – Martin Kempton (BBC Two); Coronation Street Live – The Lighting Team (ITV)	**Coronation Street Live – Camera Team (ITV)**; Strictly Come Dancing – Camera Team, Nikki Parsons (BBC One); The Sound of Music Live! – Coky Giedroyc, Richard Valentine (ITV)
Multicamera Work - Sport
**2015–16 FA Cup: "First Round – Salford City v Notts County" – Andrew Clement, Joe Noonan, Richard Lancaster, Glen Woodcock (BBC)**; Wimbledon 2016: "The Men's Final" – Pete Andrews & Centre Court Camera Crew (BBC); The Open – Jim Storey (Sky)
Make Up Design - Drama	Make Up Design - Entertainment & Non Drama
**The Night Manager – Jenna Wrage (BBC One)**; The Dresser – Jenny Shircore (BBC Two); A Midsummer Night's Dream – Claire Pritchard Jones, Neill Gorton (BBC One)	**Tracey Ullman's Show – Vanessa White, Floris Schuller, Neill Gorton (BBC One)**; The Keith Lemon Sketch Show – Emma Leon, Reza Karim (ITV2); Catherine Tate's Nan – Neill Gorton, Vanessa White (BBC One)
Music - Original Score	Music - Original Title
**Flowers – Arthur Sharpe (Channel 4)**; From Darkness – Edmund Butt (BBC One); Elizabeth at 90: A Family Tribute – Edmund Jolliffe (BBC One)	**The Night Manager – Victor Reyes (BBC One)**; The Living and the Dead – The Insects (BBC One); From Darkness – Edmund Butt, Tim Rice (BBC One)
Photography - Documentary/Factual & Non Drama	Photography - Drama & Comedy
**Imagine... Antony Gormley: Being Human – Morag Tinto (BBC One)**; My Son the Jihadi – Peter Beard (Channel 4); New Zealand: Earth's Mythical Islands – Camera Team (BBC Two)	**War & Peace – George Steel (BBC One)**; Hinterland – Stuart Biddlecombe (S4C / BBC Wales); Fleabag – Tony Miller (BBC Two)
Production Design - Drama	Production Design - Entertainment & Non Drama
**The Durrells – Stevie Herbert (ITV)**; Flowers – Luana Hanson (Channel 4); War & Peace – Chris Roope (BBC One)	**Murder in Successville – Antony Cartlidge (BBC Three)**; Strictly Come Dancing – Patrick Doherty (BBC One); Time Crashers – Peter Gordon (Channel 4)
Sound - Drama	Sound - Entertainment & Non Drama
**The Tunnel: Sabotage – Simon Bysshe, Nigel Squibbs, Jamie Caple, Jeremy Price (Sky Atlantic / Canal+)**; Marcella – James Bain, Howard Bargroff, Pete Gates, Steve Browell (ITV); River – Billy Quinn, Martin Jensen, Duncan Price, Alex Ellerington (BBC One)	**Charlie Hebdo: 3 Days That Shook Paris – Greg Gettens, James Evans, Gregor Lyon (More4)**; Strictly Come Dancing – Tony Revell (BBC One); Life in the Air – Matt Coster, Harry Hills, Pete Howell, Ben Wood (BBC One)
Picture Enhancement	Judges' Award
**A Midsummer Night's Dream – Kevin Horsewood (BBC One)**; War & Peace – Simone Grattarola (BBC One); Doctor Thorne – Ross Baker (ITV)	**Paralympics Trailer: "We're the Super Humans" (Channe 4)**
Design & Craft Innovation	Lifetime Achievement Award
**Springwatch (BBC)**	**David Odd**

=== 2015 ===
The RTS Craft & Design Awards 2015 were presented on 30 November 2015 at London Hilton on Park Lane, London. It was hosted by Scottish comedian Susan Calman.

Costume Design - Drama	Costume Design - Entertainment & Non Drama Productions
**Cilla – Amy Roberts (ITV)**; The Eichmann Show – Daiva Petrulyè (BBC Two); Poldark – Marianne Agertoft (BBC One)	**Strictly Come Dancing – Vicky Gill (BBC One)**; The Keith Lemon Sketch Show – Heather MacVean (ITV2); Raised by Wolves – Sarah Ryan (Channel 4)
Director - Fiction	Director - Non-Fiction
**Marvellous – Julian Farino (BBC Two)**; Cucumber – Alice Troughton (Channel 4); The Eichmann Show – Paul Andrew Williams (BBC Two)	**What Do Artists Do All Day?: "Episode 2 - Sue Webster" – Colette Camden (BBC Four)**; Dispatches: "Escape from ISIS" – Edward Watts (Channel 4); This World: "Outbreak: The Truth About Ebola" – Dan Edge (BBC Two)
Design - Programme Content Sequences	Design - Titles
**Sports Personality of the Year 2014: "Lewis Hamilton Contender Film" – (BBC One)**; War of Words – John Durrant, Paul Greer, Steve Burrell, Hugh Cowling (BBC Two); Doctor Who: "Flatline" – Grant Hewett, Howard Jones, Ste Dalton, Joe Thornley-Head (BBC One)	**Humans – Momoco (Channel 4 / AMC)**; Fortitude – Momoco, Nic Benns, Miki Kato, Andrea Braga, Peter Tomaszeqicz (Sky1); Agatha Christie's Partners in Crime – Peter Anderson Studios (BBC One)
Design - Trails & Packaging	Editing - Drama
**Film4 Idents – 4Creative and ManvsMachine (Film4)**; Humans – 4Creative (Channel 4 / AMC); Grand National 2015 – 4Creative (Channel 4)	**Cucumber – Paul Pandolpho (Channel 4)**; Wolf Hall – David Blackmore (BBC Two); Marvellous – Elen Pierce Lewis (BBC Two)
Editing - Documentary & Factual	Editing - Entertainment & Situation Comedy
**Welcome to Mayfair – Todd Downing (BBC Two)**; Pets: Wild at Heart – Stuart Napier, Imogen Pollard (BBC One); The Detectives – Rupert Houseman (BBC Two)	**W1A – Robin Hill (BBC Two)**; Raised by Wolves – William Webb, Pete Drinkwater (Channel 4); Cockroaches – Mark Henson, Steven Ackroyd (ITV2)
Editing - Sport	Effects - Digital
**Sports Personality of the Year – Editing Team (BBC One)**; Formula 1 2014: "End of Season Closing Montage" – Tim Boyd, Robin Nurse (BBC One); FA Cup Final – BBC Production Team and The Farm North Production (BBC One)	**Ripper Street: "Whitechapel Terminus" – Screen Scene VFX, Ed Bruce, Alan Collins, Nicholas Murphy (BBC One)**; Cilla – Tanvir Hanif, Paul Senior (ITV); Jonathan Strange & Mr Norrell – Milk VFX (BBC One)
Effects - Special	Picture Enhancement
**Fortitude – Pauline Fowler, Nik Williams, Samantha Ives, Mary Hanrahan (Sky1)**; Critical – Millennium FX (Sky1); The Musketeers – Steve Griffin, Dave Arrowsmith, Marek Ruth (BBC One)	**The Eichmann Show – Dan Coles (BBC Two)**; Indian Summers – Aidan Farrell (Channel 4); Remember Me – Aidan Farrell (BBC One)
Make Up Design - Drama	Make Up Design - Entertainment & Non Drama Productions
**Poldark – Jacqueline Fowler (BBC One)**; Critical – Natalie Pateman, Tina Brown, Jessica Wenden, Liz Philips (Sky1); The C-Word – Lesley Brennan (BBC One)	**Nurse – Vanessa White, Neill Gorton (BBC Two)**; The Keith Lemon Sketch Show – Emma Leon, Reza Karim (ITV2); Strictly Come Dancing – Lisa Armstrong, Neale Pirie (BBC One)
Music - Original Score	Music - Original Title
**Home Fires – Samuel Sim (ITV)**; Pets: Wild at Heart – Will Gregory (BBC One); Mapp & Lucia – Kevin Sargent (BBC One)	**Home Fires – Samuel Sim (ITV)**; No Offence – Vince Pope (Channel 4); Agatha Christie's Partners in Crime – Tim Phillips (BBC One)
Lighting for Multicamera	Multicamera Work
**Later... with Jools Holland: "Season 45, Episode 6" – Chris Rigby (BBC Two)**; Coronation Street – Lighting Team (ITV); VE Day 70: The Nation Remembers – Bernie Davis (BBC One)	**Release the Hounds – Tom Parr, James Abadi & Camera Team (ITV2)**; VE Day 70: The Nation Remembers – Camera Team (BBC One); Alan Carr: Chatty Man – Chris Howe (Channel 4)
Multicamera Work - Sport
**Indian Premier League – Simon Wheeler (Sky Sports)**; Six Nations 2015: "The Final Day" – Paul Davies, Matthew Griffiths (BBC One)
Production Design - Drama	Production Design - Entertainment & Non Drama Productions
**Jonathan Strange & Mr Norrell – David Roger (BBC One)**; Cilla – Lisa Hall (ITV); The Lost Honour of Christopher Jefferies – Helen Scott (ITV)	**The Keith Lemon Sketch Show – Lucy Fyfe (ITV2)**; Nurse – Brian Sykes (BBC Two); Back in Time for Dinner – Dominic Clasby, Stephen Bryce (BBC Two)
Photography - Drama	Photography - Documentary/Factual & Non Drama
**The Lost Honour of Christopher Jefferies – Mike Eley (ITV)**; Wolf Hall – Gavin Finney (BBC Two); Peaky Blinders – Simon Dennis (BBC Two)	**Secret Life of Twins – Brendan McGinty (ITV)**; Pets: Wild at Heart – Camera Team (BBC One); The Detectives – James Newton (BBC Two)
Sound - Drama	Sound - Entertainment & Non Drama Productions
**Fortitude – Sound Team (Sky1)**; Wolf Hall – Sound Team (BBC Two); Black Mirror: "White Christmas" – Jim Goddard, Stuart Hilliker, Dan Green, Alastair Widgery (Netflix)	**Shark – Kate Hopkins, Tim Owens, Will Slater, Graham Wild (BBC One)**; LA Traviata: Love, Death and Divas – Mike Hatch, Matt Skilton, Tony Burke (BBC Two); The 7/7 Bombing Survivors' Stories – Nick Fry, David Runciman, Oscar Bloomfield-Crowe (ITV)
Design & Craft Innovation	Judges' Award
**Pets: Wild at Heart – Production Team (BBC One)**	**Wolf Hall – Production Team (BBC Two)**
Lifetime Achievement Award
**Dennis De Groot**

=== 2014 ===
The RTS Craft & Design Awards 2014 were presented on 1 December 2014 at London Hilton on Park Lane, London. It was hosted by British comedian Jennifer Saunders.

Costume Design – Drama	Costume Design – Entertainment & Non Drama
**Peaky Blinders – Stephanie Collie (BBC Two)**; Utopia – Marianne Agertoft (Channel 4); The Honourable Woman – Edward K. Gibbon (BBC Two)	**Rev. – Annie Hardinge (BBC Two)**; Him & Her: The Wedding – Claire Finlay-Thompson (BBC Three); Strictly Come Dancing – Vicky Gill (BBC One)
Effects – Digital	Effects – Picture Enhancement
**Da Vinci's Demons – Tom Horton (Fox UK)**; Mr Selfridge – DNeg TV (ITV); Atlantis – Vine FX (BBC One)	**Welcome to Rio – Enge Gray (BBC Two)**; The Thirteenth Tale – Aidan Farrell (BBC Two); Utopia – Aidan Farrell (Channel 4)
Effects – Special	Editing – Drama
**The Smoke – Colin Gorry (Sky1)**; Da Vinci's Demons – Paul Kelly (Fox UK); Doctor Who: "The Day of the Doctor" – The Model Unit, Real SFX (BBC One)	**Line of Duty – Andrew McClelland (BBC Two)**; Tommy Cooper: Not Like That, Like This – Iain Erskine (ITV); Happy Valley – Jamie Pearson (BBC One)
Editing – Documentary & Factual	Editing – Entertainment & Situation Comedy
**Stop At Nothing: The Lance Armstrong Story – Philip Kloss (BBC Four)**; Arena: "The National Theatre – Part 2: War and Peace" – Joanna Crickmay (BBC Four); 15,000 Kids and Counting: "The Decision" – Gwyn Jones (Channel 4)	**Rev. – Mark Davies, Mark Henson (BBC Two)**; Off Their Rockers – Michael Wolf, Mob Dar (ITV); Some Girls – Mark Williams (BBC Three)
Editing – Sport
**BBC Match of the Day: "World Cup 2014 Closing Montage" – Tom Gent, Steve Williams (BBC One)**; World Cup: "England vs Montenegro Qualifier" (BBC Sport); Sports Personality of the Year: "AP McCoy Sequence" – Tom Gent, Steve Williams (BBC One)
Graphic Design – Programme Content Sequences	Graphic Design – Titles
**Sochi Winter Olympics: "Curling Intro" – Sarah Cook, Julian Gibbs, Jason Devine, Chris White (BBC Sport)**; Sherlock – Peter Anderson Studio (BBC One); Formula One: "Monza Intro" – Richard Gort, Julian Gibbs, Jason Devine, Chris White (BBC One)	**Luxury Comedy 2: Tales from Painted Hawaii – Matt Cooper (E4)**; The Honourable Woman – Chris Billig, Scatterlight Studios (BBC Two); By Any Means – Paul McDonnell, Hugo Moss, Tim Key, Tony Jordan (BBC One)
Graphic Design – Trails & Packaging	Lighting for Multicamera
**Rugby League World Cup – James Parry, John Sprott, Nick Farquhar, Olly Harnett (BBC Sport)**; World Cup – James Parry, Sarah Owen, John Sprott, Andy Booth (BBC Sport); Winter Olympics Opening Ceremony – James Parry, Mark Rolfe, Tomek Baginski (BBC Sport)	**Alan Carr: Chatty Man – Chris Rigby (Channel 4)**; Dancing on Ice – Dave Davey (ITV); The X Factor – Dave Davey (ITV)
Multicamera Work	Multicamera Work – Sport
**Ant & Dec's Saturday Night Takeaway – Chris Power (ITV)**; Educating Yorkshire – Tom Parr and Camera Team (Channel 4); Strictly Come Dancing – Nikki Parsons and Camera Team (BBC One)	**Grand National 2014 – Denise Large (Channel 4)**; Six Nations: "England vs Wales" – Paul Davies (BBC One); FIFA World Cup Final 2014 – Paul McNamara (BBC One / ITV)
Make Up Design – Drama	Make Up Design – Entertainment & Non Drama
**In the Flesh – Davy Jones (BBC Three)**; Inside No. 9 – Lisa Cavalli-Green (BBC Two); Peaky Blinders – Loz Schiavo (BBC Two)	**Strictly Come Dancing – Lisa Armstrong (BBC One)**; Luxury Comedy 2: Tales from Painted Hawaii – Christine Cant (E4); Harry and Paul's Story of the Twos – Christine Cant, Leslie Smith, Nina Pratley, Lisa Halstead (BBC Two)
Music – Original Score	Music – Original Title
**The Tunnel – Adrian Johnston (Sky Atlantic / Canal+)**; Utopia – Cristobal Tapia de Veer (Channel 4); Cardinal Burns – Oliver Julian (Channel 4)	**The Tunnel – Adrian Johnston, Dominik Moll (Sky Atlantic / Canal+)**; 37 Days – Andrew Simon McAllister (BBC Two); By Any Means – Samuel Sim (BBC One)
Production Design – Drama	Production Design – Entertainment & Non Drama
**Utopia – Jennifer Kernke (Channel 4)**; Our World War – Matthew Button (BBC Three); Peaky Blinders – Grant Montgomery (BBC Two)	**Cardinal Burns – Miranda Jones, Joanna Marshall, Gina Fields (Channel 4)**; Strictly Come Dancing – Patrick Doherty (BBC One); Luxury Comedy 2: Tales from Painted Hawaii – Nigel Coan, Ivana Zorn, James Dillon (E4)
Photography – Drama	Photography – Documentary/Factual & Non Drama Productions
**Utopia – Lol Crawley (Channel 4)**; The Honourable Woman – Zac Nicholson, George Steel (BBC Two); Sherlock: "His Last Vow" – Neville Kidd (BBC One)	**Rebuilding the World Trade Center – Marcus Robinson (Channel 4)**; Cardinal Burns – Jamie Cairney (Channel 4); The Disappeared – Seamas McCracken (BBC One)
Sound – Drama	Sound – Entertainment & Non Drama
**The Smoke – Stuart Hilliker, Jim Goddard, Jeff Richardson, Billy Quinn (Sky1)**; The Honourable Woman – Nigel Edwards, Linda Murdoch, Lee Crichlow, Glen Marullo (BBC Two); Our World War – Sound Team (BBC Three)	**D-Day 70: The Heroes Return - Bayeux Cemetery – Andy Payne (BBC One)**; Life and Death Row – Nick Fry, Ben Anthony, Rupert Houseman, Scott Szabo (BBC Three); Operation Grand Canyon with Dan Snow – Sam Staples, Mike Williams (BBC Two)
Lifetime Achievement Award	Judges' Award
**Clive Curtis**	**Peaky Blinders Production Team (BBC Two)**

=== 2013 ===
The RTS Craft & Design Awards 2013 were presented on 18 November 2013 at The Savoy, Strand, London. It was hosted by British comedian Brian Conley.

Costume Design - Drama	Costume Design - Entertainment & Non Drama
**Burton & Taylor – Susannah Buxton (BBC Four)**; Restless – Charlotte Holdich (BBC One); Dancing on the Edge – Lindsay Pugh (BBC Two)	**Up the Women – Claire Finlay-Thompson (BBC Four)**; Dancing on Ice – Stephen Adnitt (ITV); Strictly Come Dancing – Vicky Gill (BBC One)
Effects - Digital	Effects - Picture Enhancement
**The Girl – Simon Hansen (BBC Two / HBO)**; The Challenger Disaster – Jellyfish Pictures (BBC Two); Supersized Earth – Simon Clarke, Barney Curnow, Nuno Pereira (BBC One)	**Utopia – Aidan Farrell (Channel 4)**; The White Queen – Aidan Farrell (BBC One); Horrible Histories – John Cryer and the Platform Post Grading Team (CBBC)
Effects - Special	Graphic Design - Programme Content Sequence
**Red Dwarf X – Doug Naylor, Bill Pearson, Deane Thrussell (Dave)**; Order and Disorder – Mark Lewis, Nic Stacey, Ed Edwards, Andy Jackson (BBC Four); Strike Back: Vengeance – Max Poolman (Sky1)	**World War 2 from Space – Simon Clarke, Hazel Baird, Graham Stott, Simon George (History Channel)**; Swimming with Monsters – Nimble Gimbal (Discovery); Wonders of Life – BDH Graphics Team (BBC Two)
Graphic Design - Titles	Graphic Design - Trails & Packaging
**Hannibal – Nic Benns, Andrew Popplestone, Rodi Kaya, David Slade (Sky Living)**; Murder on the Home Front – Momoco Graphics Team (ITV); Ripper Street – Nic Benns, Jim Fisher, Miki Kato, Tom Bromwich (BBC One)	**David Attenborough's Natural Curiosities – Kjetil Njoten, Joe Lee, Sarah Caddy, Adam Parry (Eden)**
Lighting for Multicamera	Multicamera Work - Sport
**Dancing on Ice – Dave Davey (ITV)**; The Voice UK – Gurdip Mahal, Ross Williams (BBC One); Comic Relief 2013: Funny for Money – Christopher Kempton (BBC One / BBC Two)	**Wimbledon: "Murray v Djokovic (Men's Final)" – Paul Davies (BBC Sport)**; Isle of Man TT Races 2013 – Camera Team (ITV4); The Grand National 2013 – Denise Large, Carl Hicks and the IMG Racing Team (Channel 4)
Multicamera Work
**Dancing on Ice – Richard Valentine (ITV)**; BBC Wildlife Specials: "Penguins: Spy in the Huddle" – Frederique Olivier, Michael W Richards, Jim Clare, Martin Passingham (BBC One); Emmerdale: "40th Anniversary Live Episode" – Camera Team (ITV)
Make Up Design - Drama	Make Up Design - Entertainment & Non Drama
**Burton & Taylor – Lucy Cain (BBC Four)**; The Fall – Pamela Smyth (BBC Two); Call the Midwife: "Christmas Special" – Christine Walmesley-Cotham (BBC One)	**Hunderby – Vanessa White (Sky Atlantic)**; Mr Stink – Kate Benton (BBC One); A Young Doctor's Notebook – Kate Benton (Sky Arts)
Music - Original Score	Music - Original Title
**Utopia – Cristobal Tapia de Veer (Channel 4)**; Ripper Street – Dominik Scherrer (BBC One); The Fall – David Holmes, Keefus Green (BBC Two)	**Dates – Hannah Peel, Erland Cooper (Channel 4)**; Shetland – John Lunn (BBC One); Plebs – Oli Julian (ITV2)
Photography - Documentary/Factual & Non Drama	Photography - Drama
**America's Poor Kids – Jezza Neumann (BBC Two)**; Australia with Simon Reeve – Craig Hastings, Jonathan Young (BBC Two); Africa – Camera Team (BBC One)	**The Fear – Gavin Finney (Channel 4)**; Top of the Lake – Adam Arkapaw (BBC Two); The Suspicions of Mr Whicher: The Murder in Angel Lane – Tim Palmer (ITV)
Production Design - Drama	Production Design - Entertainment & Non Drama
**Restless – Stevie Herbert (BBC One)**; Utopia – Kristian Milsted (Channel 4); Ripper Street – Mark Gerghty (BBC One)	**Sports Personality of the Year 2012 – Simon Kimmel (BBC One)**; Derren Brown: Apocalypse – Dominic Clasby, Stephen Bryce (Channel 4); BBC News – BDA Set Design Team (BBC News)
Sound - Drama	Sound - Entertainment & Non Drama
**D-Day: The Last Heroes – Greg Gettens, Jamie Hartland (BBC One)**; Strike Back: Vengeance – Sound Team (Sky1); Misfits – Tony Gibson, Roger Dobson, Billy Mahoney, Russell Jeffery (E4)	**David Attenborough's Galapagos 3D – John Rogerson, Graham Kirkman, Richard Addis (Sky 3D)**; BBC Cardiff Singer of the World 2013 – Sound Team (BBC Wales); The Choir: Sing While You Work – Daniel Jones, Paul Taylor (BBC Two)
Tape & Film Editing - Documentary & Factual	Tape & Film Editing - Drama
**Syria: Across the Lines – Christopher Swayne (Channel 4)**; David Bowie: Five Years – Ged Murphy (BBC Two); How to Get to Heaven with the Hutterites – Sean Mackenzie (BBC Two)	**Luther – Katie Welland (BBC One)**; The Fear – Trevor Waite (Channel 4); Hunted – Liana Del Giudice (BBC One)
Tape & Film Editing - Entertainment & Situation Comedy	Tape & Film Editing - Sport
**Horrible Histories – Mike Holliday, Peter Oliver (CBBC)**; Dancing on Ice – Editing Team (ITV); Outnumbered: "Christmas Special (The Sick Party)" – Steve Tempia, Mark Williams (BBC One)	**Sports Personality of the Year 2012 – Editing Team (BBC One)**; Isle of Man TT Races 2013 – Post Production Team (ITV4); BBC F1 The British Grand Prix: "Lewis Hamilton and the Red Arrows" – Robin Nurse, Richard Gort (BBC Sport)
Design & Craft Innovation	Judges' Award
**D-Day: As It Happens (Channel 4)**	**BT Sport Studio**
Lifetime Achievement Award
**Andy McVean**

=== 2012 ===
The RTS Craft & Design Awards 2012 were presented on 26 November 2012 at The Savoy, Strand, London. It was hosted by British presenter Laura Hamilton.

Costume Design - Entertainment & Non Drama Productions	Costume Design - Drama
**Noel Fielding's Luxury Comedy – Ameena Kara Callender, Noel Fielding (E4)**; Strictly Come Dancing – Vicky Gill (BBC One); Horrible Histories – Ros Little & Team (CBBC)	**Great Expectations – Annie Symons (BBC One)**; Call the Midwife – Amy Roberts (BBC One); This Is England '88 – Charlotte Walter (Channel 4)
Effects - Digital	Effects - Special
**The Fades – Lexhag Visual Effects Team (BBC Three)**; Great Expectations – Bluebolt (BBC One); Sinbad: "Episode 1" – The Mill (Sky1)	**Mongrels – Andy Heath and Iestyn Evans of Talk to the Hand (BBC Three)**; Great Expectations – Colin Gorry, Ed Smith (BBC One); Downton Abbey – Mark Holt, James Davis (ITV)
Effects - Picture Enhancement	Graphic Design - Titles
**White Heat – Paul Staples (BBC Two)**; Great Expectations – Jet Omoshebi (BBC One); Horrible Histories – John Cryer (CBBC)	**Parade's End: "Episode One" – Rupert Ray (BBC Two / HBO)**; People & Power – Patrick Bedeau, Pierangelo Pirak (Al Jazeera America); Great Expectations – Nic Benns, Rodi Kaya, Miki Kato, Tom Bromwich (BBC One)
Graphic Design - Trails & Packaging	Graphic Design - Programme Content Sequences
**BBC 2012 – The Olympics (BBC)**	**Newsround: "My Autism and Me" – Victoria Bell, Owenna Griffiths, Daniel Clarke, Black North (CBBC)**; Dirty Great Machines – Creative Nuts (Channel 5); London 2012: The Importance of Sport – Julian Gibbs, Richard Gort, Robin Nurse (BBC Sport)
Lighting for Multicamera	Multicamera Work
**The Diamond Jubilee Concert – Durham Marenghi, Tim Routledge, Sam Pattinson, Steve Nolan (BBC One)**; Dancing on Ice – Dave Davey (ITV); The X Factor – Dave Davey (ITV)	**Adele Live At the Royal Albert Hall – Paul Dugdale, Simon Pizey, Phil Lee, Cordelia Plunket (BBC One)**; Dancing on Ice – Richard Valentine (ITV); America's Cup World Series 2011: "Plymouth GBR Regatta" – SIS LIVE & ACEA On-Board Camera Teams (Sky Sports)
Make Up Design - Drama	Make Up Design - Entertainment & Non Drama Productions
**Appropriate Adult – Janet Horsfield (ITV)**; The Fades – Christine Allsopp (BBC Three); This Is England '88 – Catherine Scoble (Channel 4)	**Noel Fielding's Luxury Comedy – Christine Cant (E4)**; Facejacker: "Episode One" – Kristyan Mallett, Sarah Lockwood (Channel 4); Horrible Histories – Cheryl Mitchell, Kate Benton, Marie Deehan (CBBC)
Music - Original Score	Music - Original Title
**Lucien Freud: Painted Life – John Harle (BBC Two)**; Holy Flying Circus – Jack C. Arnold (BBC Four); The Best of Men – Mark Russell (BBC Two)	**The Fades – Paul Thomson (BBC Three)**; Without You – Edmund Butt (ITV); The Last Weekend – Rob Lane (ITV)
Photography - Documentary/Factual & Non Drama Productions	Photography - Drama
**Earthflight – Camera Team (BBC One)**; After Life: The Strange Science of Decay – Camera Team (BBC Four); Frozen Planet – Camera Team (BBC One)	**Blackout – Christopher Ross (BBC One)**; The Mystery of Edwin Drood (miniseries) – Alan Almond (BBC Two); Birdsong – Julian Court (BBC One)
Production Design - Entertainment & Non Drama Productions	Production Design - Drama
**Turn Back Time: The Family – Peter Findley (BBC One)**; The Diamond Jubilee Concert – Mark Fisher (BBC One); Horrible Histories – Miranda Jones & Team (CBBC)	**Great Expectations – David Roger (BBC One)**; Parade's End: "Episode One" – Martin Childs (BBC Two / HBO); Doctor Who: "The Doctor, the Widow and the Wardrobe" – Michael Pickwoad (BBC One)
Sound - Entertainment & Non Drama Productions	Sound - Drama
**David Attenborough's Bachelor King 3D – John Rogerson, Johnathan Rush, Alastair Sirkett (Sky 3D)**; Stephen Hawking's Grand Design: "The Meaning of Life" – John Rogerson, Alastair Sirkett (Discovery Channel); Gary Barlow: On Her Majesty's Service – Mark Atkinson, Andy Hodges (BBC One)	**White Heat – David Old, Chris Roberts, Richard Fordham, Martin Trevis (BBC Two)**; Merlin – Ben Baird, Jamie McPhee, Adrian Bell & Team (BBC One); Misfits – Russell Jeffery, Tony Gibson, Roger Dobson, Billy Mahoney (E4)
Tape & Film Editing - Entertainment & Situation Comedy	Tape & Film Editing - Documentary & Factual
**Mrs. Brown's Boys – Mark Lawrence (BBC One / RTÉ One)**; I'm a Celebrity...Get Me Out of Here! – Editing Team (ITV); Outnumbered: "The Exchange Student (Part 2)" – Steve Tempia, Mark Williams (BBC One)	**Protecting Our Children – Sacha Mirzoeff, Ollie Huddleston, Colette Hodges, Darren Flaxstone (BBC Two)**; Educating Essex – Joby Gee, Ben Brown, Michael Harrowes, Nick Packer (Channel 4); Ashley Banjo's Secret Street Crew: "Darts" – Peter Hein (Sky1)
Tape & Film Editing Drama	Design & Craft Innovation
**Appropriate Adult – Andrew Hulme (ITV)**; Great Expectations – Victoria Boydell (BBC One); Murder – Jacob Thuesen (BBC Two)	**London 2012 Olympic Opening Ceremony Production Team (BBC)**
Lifetime Achievement Award	Judges' Award
**Keir & Louise Lusby**	**London 2012 Olympic Coverage (BBC Sport)**

=== 2011 ===
Costume Design – Drama	Costume Design – Entertainment & Non Drama Productions
**The Crimson Petal and the White – Annie Symons (BBC Two)**; Eric and Ernie – Joanna Eatwell (BBC Two); This Is England '86 – Charlotte Walter (Channel 4)	**The Impressions Show with Culshaw and Stephenson – Lucia Santa Maria (BBC One)**; Dancing on Ice – Stephen Adnitt (ITV); Come Fly with Me – Annie Hardinge (BBC One)
Effects – Digital	Effects – Special
**Misfits – Erik Ellefsen, George Kyparissous, Sarah Norton, Jo Amery (E4)**; Inside the Human Body – Phil Dobree, Dan Upton, Sophie Orde, Matt Chandler, Jellyfish Pictures (BBC One); Doctor Who: "A Christmas Carol" – The Mill (BBC One)	**Strike Back: Project Dawn – Big Bang Stunts & Effects (Sky1)**; Coronation Street Live – Danny Hargreaves (ITV); The Shadow Line – Ed Smith, Colin Gorry Effects (BBC Two)
Graphic Design – Programme Content Sequences	Graphic Design – Titles
**F1 Monaco Grand Prix – Richard Gort, Mark Wilkin, Eddie Butler, Turquoise Branding (BBC One)**; Super Bowl XLV – Julian Gibbs, Ron Chakraborty, Richard Gort (BBC One); Random – Stuart Pitcher, Simon Dowling, Jason Griffin, Tim Baxter (Channel 4)	**Any Human Heart – Hugo Moss, Justin Lowings, Paul McDonnell (Channel 4)**; The Hour – Amy Merry, Yianni Papanicolaou (BBC Two); Come Fly with Me – Production Team (BBC One)
Lighting For Multicamera	Multicamera Work
**Coronation Street Live – Chris Chisnall & The Lighting Team (ITV)**; Strictly Come Dancing: "Halloween Special" – Mark Kenyon (BBC One); Copy Cats – Roger Williams (CBBC)	**24 Hours in A&E – Camera Team (Channel 4)**; Wimbledon: "Nadal Vs Murray (Men's Semifinal)" – Paul Davies & The SIS Camera Team (BBC Sport); The Royal Wedding – The Team of Directors & Cameramen (BBC One)
Make Up Design – Drama	Make Up Design – Entertainment & Non Drama Productions
**The Crimson Petal and the White – Jacqueline Fowler (BBC Two)**; Eric and Ernie – Christina Baker (BBC Two); Psychoville: "Halloween Special" – Penny Smith (BBC Two)	**Come Fly with Me – Lisa Cavalli-Green & Team (BBC One)**; Strictly Come Dancing: "Halloween Special" – Lisa Armstrong (BBC One); The Impressions Show with Culshaw and Stephenson – Lucy Cain & Team (BBC One)
Music – Original Score	Music – Original Title
**Misfits – Vince Pope (E4)**; BBC Wildlife Specials: "Polar Bear: Spy on the Ice" – Will Gregory (BBC One); The Suspicions of Mr Whicher – Rob Lane (ITV)	**Zen – Adrian Johnston (BBC One)**; Come Fly with Me – David Arnold (BBC One); Downton Abbey – John Lunn (ITV)
Photography – Drama	Photography – Documentary/Factual & Non Drama Productions
**Downton Abbey – David Katznelson (ITV)**; Christopher and His Kind – Kieran McGuigan (BBC Two); Martina Cole's The Runaway – Owen McPolin (Sky1)	**Human Planet: "Jungles – People of the Trees" – Camera Team (BBC One)**; Human Planet: "Oceans – Into the Blue" – Camera Team (BBC One); Storyville: "Marathon Boy" – Matt Norman, Tony Miller, Vijay Bedi, Alphonse Roy (BBC Four)
Production Design – Drama	Production Design – Entertainment & Non Drama Productions
**The Crimson Petal and the White – Grant Montgomery (BBC Two)**; Psychoville: "Halloween Special" – Brian Sykes (BBC Two); South Riding – Chris Roope (BBC One)	**Miranda – Harry Banks (BBC Two)**; Match of the Day / Football Focus – Peter Aston (BBC One); How Not to Live Your Life – Iain McDonald (BBC Three)
Sound – Drama	Sound – Entertainment & Non Drama
**The Shadow Line – Glen Marullo, Nigel Edwards, Linda Murdoch, Lee Crichlow (BBC Two)**; Bill Bailey's Little Crackers – Sound Team (Sky1); Coronation Street Live – Alan Monks & The Sound Team (ITV)	**Wootton Bassett: The Town That Remembers – Matt Skilton, Paul Paragon & The Sound Team (BBC One)**; Strictly Come Dancing: "Halloween Special" – Tony Revell, Andy Tapley, Howard Hopkins (BBC One); The X Factor – The Farm Audio Team (ITV)
Tape & Film Editing – Drama	Tape & Film Editing – Documentary & Factual
**Exile – Roy Sharman (BBC One)**; Random – Victoria Boydell (Channel 4); Thorne – John Smith (Sky1)	**Our War – Chris King (BBC Three)**; BBC Wildlife Specials: "Polar Bear: Spy on the Ice" – Stuart Napier, Imogen Pollard (BBC One); 24 Hours in A&E – Edit Team (Channel 4)
Tape & Film Editing – Entertainment & Situation Comedy	Picture Enhancement
**Friday Night Dinner – Lucien Clayton (Channel 4)**; I'm a Celebrity...Get Me Out of Here! – Post Production Team (ITV); The X Factor – The Farm Editing Team (ITV)	**Eric and Ernie – Sonny Sheriden (BBC Two)**; Armstrong and Miller – Ross Baker (BBC One); The Hour – Gareth Spensley, Molinare (BBC Two)
Design & Craft Innovation	Judges' Award
**BBC Wildlife Specials: "Polar Bear: Spy on the Ice" Production Team (BBC One)**	**Spooks Production Team**
Lifetime Achievement Award
**Martin Hawkins**

=== 2010 ===
The RTS Craft & Design Awards 2010 were presented on 24 November 2010 at The Savoy, Strand, London. It was hosted by British presenters Richard McCourt and Dominic Wood.

Costume Design - Drama	Costume Design - Entertainment & Non Drama
**Worried About the Boy – Annie Symons (BBC Two)**; Enid – Lucinda Wright (BBC Four); An Englishman in New York – Joey Attawia (ITV)	**Facejacker – Kayvan Novak (Channel 4)**; Dancing on Ice – Stephen Adnitt (ITV); Bellamy's People of the United Kingdom of Great Britain and Northern Ireland – June Nevin (BBC Two)
Effects - Digital	Effects - Special
**Doctor Who: "The Pandorica Opens" – The Mill (BBC One)**; Big Babies – Paul Tuersley & The Visual Effects Team (CBBC); Terry Pratchett's Going Postal – Simon Thomas, Reuben Barkataki, Zoltan Benyo, Zoltan Szarvasi (Sky1)	**Misfits – Mark Holt (E4)**; Merlin: "The Last Dragonlord" – The Mill, Merlin VFX Team (BBC One); Mission: 2110 – James Morgan, Chris Reynolds, Millennium FX, Nick Hopkin (CBBC)
Effects - Picture Enhancement	Graphic Design - Programme Content Sequence
**Sherlock – Kevin Horsewood (BBC One)**; Outnumbered – Ross Baker (BBC One); Misfits – Perry Gibbs (E4)	**Inside the Perfect Predator – Jellyfish Pictures, Burrell Durrant Hifle (BBC One)**; BBC Election Night – BBC News Graphics, Brainstorm/Idonix (BBC One); History of Now: "Episode 1" – John Durrant, Duncan Dix, Jon Doe, Mick Connaire (BBC Two)
Graphic Design - Titles	Graphic Design - Trails and Packaging
**World Cup 2010 – John McKenna, Richard Norley, Russell Mann, Paul McNamara (ITV)**; Luther – Momoco (BBC One); History of Now – John Durrant, Jon Doe, Duncan Dix (BBC Two)	**Winter Olympics – Louisa Fyans, Karen Potterton, Damon Collins, Marc Craste (BBC Sport)**; Heston's Feasts – James Berridge, John Cryer, Simon Glover (Channel 4)
Lighting and Multi Camera - Lighting for Multi Camera	Lighting and Multi Camera - Multi Camera Work
**Dancing on Ice – Dave Davey (ITV)**; EastEnders Live – John Carberry (BBC One); Playhouse: Live: "The Typist" – Martin Kempton (Sky Arts)	**EastEnders Live – Clive Arnold, Duncan Unsworth (BBC One)**; One Born Every Minute: "Episode 4" – Camera Team (Channel 4); Dancing on Ice – Paul Kirrage (ITV)
Make Up Design - Drama	Make Up Design - Entertainment and Non-Drama
**Mo – Chrissie Baker (Channel 4)**; The Fattest Man in Britain – Neill Gorton, Janet Horsfield (ITV); Worried About the Boy – Donald McInnes (BBC Two)	**Facejacker – Kristyan Mallett (Channel 4)**; Stone Age Atlantis – Mike Stringer, Suzanne Bates, Mike H. G. Bates (National Geographic Channel); Bellamy's People of the United Kingdom of Great Britain and Northern Ireland – Jane Walker (BBC Two)
Music - Original Score	Music - Original Title
**Terry Pratchett's Going Postal – John Lunn (Sky1)**; Sherlock – David Arnold, Michael Price (BBC One); Emma – Samuel Sim (BBC One)	**Sherlock – David Arnold, Michael Price (BBC One)**; Garrow's Law – Edmund Butt (BBC One); The Deep – Samuel Sim (BBC One)
Photography - Drama	Photography - Documentary/Factual & Non-Drama Productions
**Terry Pratchett's Going Postal – Gavin Finney (Sky1)**; Sherlock – Steve Lawes (BBC One); Misfits – Christopher Ross (E4)	**Natural World: "Victoria Falls" – Charlie Hamilton James, Jamie McPherson, Simon Werry (BBC Two)**; Life: "Insects" – Rod Clarke, Kevin Flay (BBC One); Tropic of Cancer – Jonathan Young (BBC)
Production Design - Drama	Production Design - Entertainment and Non-Drama
**Wallander: "The Fifth Woman" – Jacqueline Abrahams (BBC One)**; Terry Pratchett's Going Postal – Ricky Eyres, Lee Gordon, Ray McNeill, Monica Esztan (Sky1); Doctor Who: "The Pandorica Opens" – Edward Thomas (BBC One)	**Mongrels – Simon Rogers & Team (BBC Three)**; The IT Crowd – Jo Sutherland (Channel 4); Hounded – James S. Thompson, Lucy Fewell & Team (CBBC)
Tape and Film Editing - Drama	Tape and Film Editing - Documentary/Factual
**Sherlock – Charlie Phillips (BBC One)**; Dive – David Charap (BBC Two); Five Days – Phillip Kloss (BBC One)	**Requiem for Detroit – Caroline Richards, Julien Temple (BBC Two)**; One Born Every Minute: "Episode 2" – Editing Team (Channel 4); Jobless – Brian Woods (BBC One)
Tape and Film Editing - Entertainment and Situation Comedy	Sound - Drama
**Pete versus Life – Mark Davies, Mark Everson (Channel 4)**; Peep Show – Mark Davies, Mark Everson (Channel 4); Mongrels – Nigel Williams & Team (BBC Three)	**Misfits – Billy Mahoney, Roger Dobson, Tony Gibson, Russell Jeffrey (E4)**; Cranford – Paul Hamblin, Peter Brill, Iain Eyre, Lee Walpole (BBC One); Strike Back – Stuart Hilliker, Lee Walpole, Iain Eyre, J. J. Le Roux (Sky1)
Sound - Entertainment and Non Drama	Lifetime Achievement Award
**Richard Hammond's Invisible Worlds – John Rogerson & The Halo Sound Team (BBC One)**; Life: "Mammals" – Tim Owens, Graham Wild (BBC One); Murder on the Lake – Matt Skilton, Paul Paragon (BBC Four)	**Eddie Mansell**
Design & Craft Innovation	Judges' Award
**Maverick New Media Team**	**Coronation Street Production Team**

=== 2009 ===
The RTS Craft & Design Awards 2009 were presented on 23 November 2009 at The Park Lane Hotel, Piccadilly in London. The evening was hosted by presenter and actor Justin Lee Collins.

Costume Design - Drama	Costume Design - Entertainment & Non Drama
**Psychoville – Yves Barre (BBC Two)**; Little Dorrit – Barbara Kidd (BBC One); Red Riding 1974 – Natalie Ward (Channel 4)	**The Legend of Dick and Dom – Jane Stuart Brown (BBC One)**
Effects - Digital Effects	Effects - Special Effects
**The Wrong Door – VFX Team (BBC Three)**; Wallace & Gromit: A Matter of Loaf and Death – Bram Ttwheam (BBC One); Doctor Who: "The Next Doctor" – The Mill (BBC One)	**Being Human – Millennium FX (BBC Three)**; Skellig – Richard van den Bergh (Sky1); Apparitions – Davy Jones (BBC One)
Effects - Picture Enhancement	Graphic Design - Programme Content Sequences
**Wallander – Aidan Farrell, The Farm (BBC One)**; Moonshot: The Flight of Apollo 11 – Trevor Brown, Ascent 142 (ITV1); Skellig – Mick Vincent, The Mill (Sky1)	**Formula 1: Australian Grand Prix – Mark Wilkin, Richard Gort & Intro Design (BBC One)**; Charles Darwin and the Tree of Life – Mick Connaire, Luke Wilmot, Tony Gilbert, Jeremy Horton (BBC One)
Graphic Design - Trails and Packaging	Graphic Design - Titles
**Great Adaptations – Rob Heath, Selena Cunningham (Film4)**; Hidden Japan – Oliver Harnett, Matt McDermott (BBC Four); Chosen 4Creative/More4 – Brian Harrington, Shizuka Hata & Why Not Associates (Channel 4)	**British Style Genius – Orla Handley, Paul Greer, John Durrant (BBC Two)**; America and AlQaeda – Melanie Woelzemueller, Patrick Bedeau, Al Jazeera English Creative Division (Al Jazeera English); Formula One – Liquid TV (BBC One)
Lighting, Photography & Camera - Photography - Drama	Lighting, Photography & Camera - Multicamera Work
**The Devil's Whore – Julian Court (Channel 4)**; Wallander – Anthony Dod Mantle (BBC One); Tess of the D'Urbervilles – Wojciech Szepel (BBC One)	**The Family – Camera Team (Channel 4)**; Dancing on Ice – Paul Kirrage (ITV); We Are Klang: "Fire", "Election" – Rob Kitzmann (BBC Three)
Lighting, Photography & Camera - Photography - Documentary/Factual & Non-Drama	Lifetime Achievement Award
**BBC Wildlife Specials: "Swarm: Nature's Incredible Invasions" – Neill Rettig, Mark Payne Gill, Michael Richards, Jonathan Jones (BBC One)**	**Bobby Warans**
Make Up Design - Entertainment & Non Drama	Make Up Design - Drama
**Dancing on Ice – Rena Metcalfe, Paul Haskell (ITV)**; Kröd Mändoon and the Flaming Sword of Fire – Daniel Parker (BBC Two)	**Moses Jones – Emma Scott (BBC Two)**; The Devil's Whore – Nadine Prigge (Channel 4); Skellig – Conor O' Sullivan, Rob Trenton (Sky1)
Music - Original Score	Music - Original Title
**Yellowstone – Edmund Butt (BBC Two)**; Occupation – Daniel Pemberton (BBC One); Moses Jones – Craig Pruess (BBC Two)	**Wallander – Emily Barker, Martin Phipps (BBC One)**; BBC Wildlife Specials: "Swarm: Nature's Incredible Invasions" – Will Gregory, Stuart Gordon (BBC One); Desperate Romantics – Daniel Pemberton (BBC Two)
Production Design - Entertainment & Non Drama	Production Design - Drama
**Take That Come to Town – Peter Bingemann (ITV)**; Stewart Lee's Comedy Vehicle – Simon Rogers (BBC Two); I'm a Celebrity...Get Me Out of Here! – Trials Team (ITV1)	**Margaret Great – David Roger (BBC Two)**; Occupation – Ashleigh Jeffers (BBC One); Wallace & Gromit: A Matter of Loaf and Death – Phil Lewis, Jan Sanger, Matt Perry (BBC One)
Tape and Film Editing - Documentary/Factual	Tape and Film Editing - Drama
**The Fallen – Joby Gee (BBC Two)**; Joanna Lumley in the Land of the Northern Lights – Justin Amsden (BBC One); The Hospital – Paul Carlin (Channel 4)	**Being Human – Phil Hookway (BBC Three)**; Occupation – Victoria Boydell (BBC One); Freefall – David Charap (BBC Two)
Tape and Film Editing - Entertainment and Situation Comedy	Sound - Entertainment and Non Drama
**The X Factor – The Farm Editing Team (ITV)**; Walk on the Wild Side – Adam Bokey, Charlie Fawcett (BBC One); Fonejacker – Kayvan Novak, Ed Tracy, Vicki Kitchingman, Warren Chapman (E4)	**Proms 2009 – Andy Payne & SIS Lives Sound Team (BBC)**; The Family – Sound Team (Channel 4); South Pacific: "Ocean of Islands" – Kate Hopkins, Tim Owens, Andrew Wilson South Pacific (BBC Two)
Sound - Drama
**Occupation – Mervyn Moore, Danny Finn, Pietro Dalmasso, Ian Wilkinson (BBC One)**; Wallander – Bosse Persson, Lee Crichlow, Iain Eyre, Paul Hamblin (BBC One); Wallace & Gromit: A Matter of Loaf and Death – Adrian Rhodes (BBC One)
Design & Craft Innovation	Judges Award
**CBeebies**	**Florian Wieder and Dave Davey – The X-Factor (ITV)**

=== 2008 ===
The RTS Craft & Design Awards 2008 were presented on 24 November 2008.

Costume Design - Drama	Graphic Design - Programme Content Sequences
**Margaret Thatcher: The Long Walk to Finchley – Charlotte Holdich (BBC Four)**; House of Saddam – Alexandra Caulfield (BBC Two); Skins – Edward K, Gibbon (E4)	**Bizarre ER – Jon Doe (BBC Three)**; Britain from Above – Rogerio Alves, Dave Corfield, Martin Blunden (BBC); Britannia – Kiss My Pixel Comics (BBC Four)
Graphic Design - Titles	Graphic Design - Trails & Packaging
**Match of the Day: "UEFA Euro 2008" – Sunil Patel, Phil Bigwood, Busty Kelp, Unkle (BBC One)**; Criminal Justice – Peter Anderson (BBC One); 2008 Summer Olympics – Jonathan Bramley, Rebekah Kipps, Damon Albarn, Jamie Hewlett (BBC One)	**The White Season – RKCR/Y&R and Red Bee Media (BBC Two)**; Wonderland – Joan Hillery (BBC Two)
Lighting, Photography & Camera - Photography - Documentary/Factual & Non Drama Productions	Lighting, Photography & Camera - Photography - Drama
**A Boy Called Alex – Dave Bennett, Alex Chapman, Stephen Walker (Channel 4)**; Britain from Above – Peter Thompson, Lee Pulbrook (BBC); Wild China: "Heart of the Dragon" – Mike Lemmon, Justin Maguire (BBC Two)	**Spooks – Damian Bromley (BBC One)**; White Girl – Wojciech Szepel (BBC Two); Cranford – Ben Smithard (BBC One)
Lighting, Photography & Camera - Lighting for Multicamera	Lighting, Photography & Camera - Multicamera Work
**Not Going Out – Martin Kempton (BBC One)**; Dancing on Ice – Dave Davey (ITV); The Kylie Show – Al Gurdon (ITV)	**The Kylie Show – Simon Staffurth, Phil Piotrowsky (ITV)**; Dancing on Ice – Paul Kirrage (ITV); Two Pints of Lager Live! – David Bowden (BBC Three)
Make Up Design - Drama	Make Up Design – Entertainment & Non Drama Productions
**House of Saddam – Marella Shearer (BBC Two)**; Miss Austen Regrets – Christine Walmesley-Cotham (BBC One); Oliver Twist – Anne Oldham (BBC One)	**Revealed: "Sex and the Neanderthals" – Mike H G Bates, Mike Stringer, Kim Freeland (Five)**
Music - Original Score	Music - Original Title
**Criminal Justice – John Lunn (BBC One)**; Miss Austen Regrets – Jennie Muskett (BBC One); First Cut: "Watch Me Disappear" – Wayne Roberts (Channel 4)	**Sense and Sensibility – Martin Phipps (BBC One)**; Mutual Friends – Ben Bartlett (BBC One)
Production Design - Entertainment & Non Drama Productions	Production Design - Drama
**Britain's Got Talent: "Live Final Show" – Dominic Tolfts (ITV)**; Dancing on Ice – Markus Blee (ITV); Glastonbury Festival 2008 – Markus Blee, Alison Howe (BBC Two, BBC Three, BBC Four)	**Frankie Howerd: Rather You Than Me, The Curse of Steptoe, Hughie Green: Most Sincerely – Patrick Bill (BBC Four)**; House of Saddam – Maurice Cain (BBC Two); City of Vice – James Lewis (Channel 4)
Sound - Drama	Sound - Entertainment & Non Drama Productions
**Doctor Who: "Midnight" – Julian Howarth, Tim Ricketts, Paul McFadden, Paul Jefferies (BBC One)**; Criminal Justice: "Episode 2" – Sound Team (BBC One); The Street – Sound Team (BBC One)	**Meet the Natives – Will Anderson, Tom Beard, Chris King, Matt Skilton (Channel 4)**; Natural World: "Badgers: Secrets of the Sett" – Andrew Cooper, Paul Clark, Martyn Harries (BBC Two); The Choir: Boys Don't Sing – Sam Mathewson, David Harcombe, Daniel Jones (BBC Two)
Tape & Film Editing - Drama	Tape & Film Editing - Documentary/Factual
**Criminal Justice – Sarah Brewerton (BBC One)**; White Girl – Úna Ní Dhonghaíle (BBC Two); Spooks – Jamie Pearson (BBC One)	**Monkey Thieves – Gary Thomas, Rupert Troskie, Marlon Wilson, Dan Schwalm (National Geographical Wild)**; Parallel Worlds, Parallel Lives – Folko Boermans (BBC Four); Beautiful Young Minds – Joby Gee (BBC Two)
Tape & Film Editing - Entertainment & Situation Comedy	Visual Effects - Digital Effects
**Deal or No Deal – The Farm Editing Team (Channel 4 )**; Fonejacker: "Christmas Special" – Kayvan Novak, Ed Tracy (E4); Outnumbered – Nigel Williams (BBC Two)	**The Street – Tanvir Hanif (BBC One)**; Attila the Hun – Gareth Edwards, Luke Wilmot, Tony Gilbert (BBC One); Frankenstein – Jellyfish Pictures (ITV)
Visual Effects - Special Effects	Visual Effects - Picture Enhancement
**Being Human – Millennium FX (BBC Three)**; Human Body: Pushing the Limits – The Model Unit (Discovery Channel)	**Battle for Haditha – Dan Coles (Channel 4)**; Boy A – Aidan Farrell (Channel 4); He Kills Coppers – Kevin Horsewood (ITV)
Design & Craft Innovation	Judges' Award
**Headcases (ITV)**	**City of Vice Production Team (Channel 4)**
Lifetime Achievement Award
**Mike Milne**

=== 2007 ===
The RTS Craft and Design Awards 2007 took place on 29 November 2007 at The Savoy in London. It was hosted by Fearne Cotton and Holly Willoughby.

Costume Design - Entertainment & Non - Drama Productions	Costume Design - Drama
**Dancing on Ice – Stephen Adnitt (ITV)**; Roman's Empire – June Nevin (BBC Two); Benidorm – Steven Noble (ITV)	**Ancient Rome: The Rise and Fall of an Empire – Ros Little (BBC One)**; The Wind in the Willows – Vin Burnham (BBC); Housewife, 49 – Charlotte Holdich (ITV)
Graphic Design - Titles	Graphic Design - Programme Content Sequences
**Sky Creative – Hywel Williams & Adrian Harrison Gilbert, George Night (BSkyB)**; Skins – Tal Rosner (E4); The Secret Life of Mrs Beeton – Hugo Moss, Tamsin McGee at Huge Designs (BBC)	**Fonejacker – Ed Tracy, Kayvan Novak, Vicki Kitchingman, Warren Chapman (E4)**; Seven Ages of Rock – John Durrant, Orla Handley, Jon Doe, Steve Bell (BBC Two); Monster Moves: "Colossal Churches" – Dave Throssell (Five)
Graphic Design - Trails & Packaging
**Sky Creative – Hywel Williams, John Sunter, Paul Buckmaster, Adrian Harrison, Philip Glass (BSkyB)**; S4C Idents – Dylan Griffith, Dan Witchell, Roger Whittlesea, Simon Ratigan (S4C); Icons Promo – Dylan Griffith, Dan Witchell, Roger Whittlesea, Richard Acton (S4C)
Lighting for Multicamera	Multicamera Work
**Dancing on Ice – Dave Davey (ITV)**; Songs of Praise – Bernie Davis (BBC One); Any Dream Will Do – Mark Kenyon (BBC One)	**Dancing on Ice – Paul Kirrage (ITV)**; Swan Lake – Vince Spooner (BBC One); An Audience With Take That: Live! – Simon Staffurth and Camera Team (ITV)
Photography - Documentary/Factual & Non-Drama	Photography - Drama
**Natural World: "Wye - Voices from the Valley" – Charlie Hamilton James, Jamie McPherson (BBC Two)**; Galápagos: "Born of Fire" – Paul Stewart, Barrie Britton, Richard Wollocombe (BBC Two); Planet Earth: "Ice Worlds" – Camera Team (BBC One)	**Jane Eyre – Mike Eley (BBC One)**; Spooks – Damian Bromley (BBC One); Skins – Nick Dance (E4)
Make Up Design - Entertainment & Non-Drama Productions	Make Up Design - Drama
**Benidorm – Diane Chenery-Wickens (ITV)**; Hyperdrive – Davy Jones, Mike Bates, Mike Stringer (BBC Two); Wedding Belles – Sandy Staples (Channel 4)	**The Mark of Cain – Marella Shearer (Channel 4)**; Mysterious Creatures – Sharon Martin (ITV); Casualty – Marcus Whitney (BBC One)
Music - Original Score	Music - Original Title Music
**Charlie and Lola – John Greswell, David Schweitzer (CBeebies)**; Jane Eyre – Rob Lane (BBC One); The Mark of Cain – Ben Bartlett (Channel 4)	**The Amazing Mrs Pritchard – John Lunn (BBC One)**; Coast – Alan Parker (BBC Two); Springwatch – David Poore (BBC Two)
Production Design - Entertainment & Non-Drama Productions	Production Design - Drama
**The Human Footprint – Clare Patey, Cathy Wren (Channel 4)**; The X Factor – Florian Wieder (ITV); Brit Awards 2007 – Mark Fisher, Stufish (ITV)	**Skins – Amelia Shankland (E4)**; Maxwell – Stevie Herbert (BBC One); Life on Mars – Matt Gant, Brian Sykes (BBC One)
Sound - Drama	Sound - Entertainment & Non-Drama Productions
**9/11: The Twin Towers – Peter Baldock, Tim White, Cliff Jones (BBC One)**; Jane Eyre – Richard Manton, Stuart Hilliker, Ian Wilkinson, Stephen Griffiths (BBC One); Spooks – Rudi Buckle, James Feltham, Darren Banks (BBC One)	**War Oratorio – Paul Paragon, Dominic Muldowney, Mike Hatch, Ben Baird (Channel 4)**; An Audience With Take That: Live! – Toby Alington (ITV); Strictly Come Dancing – BBC Studios Sound Team (BBC One)
Tape and Film Editing - Drama	Tape and Film Editing - Documentary/Factual
**Forgiven – Luke Dunkley (Channel 4)**; The Mark of Cain – Philip Kloss (Channel 4); The Thick of It – Billy Sneddon and Ant Boys (BBC Four)	**The Tower – Ben Brown (BBC One)**; Natural World: "Wye - Voices from the Valley" – Nigel Buck (BBC Two); Horizon: "The Six Billion Dollar Experiment" – Darren Jonusas (BBC Two)
Tape and Film Editing - Entertainment & Situation Comedy	Visual Effects - Special Effects
**Fonejacker – Ed Tracy, Kayvan Novak, Vicki Kitchingman, Warren Chapman, Joe Haughey (E4)**; Peep Show – Mark Everson (Channel 4); The X Factor – Chris Stott, Phil Box, Nik O'Dell, Jamie Bull (ITV)	**Bodies – Millennium FX, Neill Gorton, Rob Mayor (BBC Three)**; The Mark of Cain – Neal Champion (Channel 4)
Visual Effects - Picture Enhancement	Visual Effects - Digital Effects
**Persuasion – Kevin Horsewood, Pepper Post Production (ITV)**; The Wind in the Willows – Chris Beeton, Pepper Post Production (BBC); Jekyll – Aidan Farrell, The Farm (BBC One)	**Fight for Life – Philip Dobree, The Digital Effects Team, Jellyfish Pictures (BBC One)**; 20th Century Battles – Red Vision (BBC Two); Primeval – Digital Effects Team (ITV)
Lifetime Achievement	Judges' Award
**Nick Park, Aardman Animation**	**Doctors Production Team**

=== 2006 ===
The RTS Craft and Design Awards 2006 took place on 20 November 2006 at The Savoy in London. It was hosted by Fearne Cotton and Holly Willoughby.

Costume Design - Entertainment & Non Drama Productions	Costume Design - Drama
**Strictly Dance Fever – Venetia Ercolani (BBC One)**; Dancing on Ice – Stephen Adnitt (ITV); Nighty Night – Claire Finlay (BBC Three)	**Bleak House – Andrea Galer (BBC One)**; Doctor Who – Louise Page (BBC One); The Virgin Queen – Amy Roberts (BBC One)
Graphic Design - Trails & Packaging	Graphic Design - Programme Content Sequences
**Pin Protection – Dave Faulkner, Kenny Reynolds, Tim Smyllie (BSkyB)**; E4 Music Identity – ISO (E4); Music on S4C – Dylan Griffith, Aled Phillips, Owain Elidir, Paul Nicholas (S4C)	**Conan Doyle for the Defence – ISO (BBC)**; Are We Changing Planet Earth? / Can We Save Planet Earth? – Rob Hifle, Paul Greer, Jon Doe, Burrell Durrant Hifle, Design Team (BBC One); Making Slough Happy – Gideon Bradshaw, Rob Chiu (BBC Two)
Graphic Design - Titles	Judges' Award
**International Cricket – Christopher Wilcock, Andrew Paraskos, Richard Vowles (BSkyB)**; Mercury Prize 2005 – Gareth Price (BBC Four); The IT Crowd – Shynola (Channel 4)	**Planet Earth Team (BBC One)**
Lighting, Photography and Camera - Lighting for Multicamera	Lighting, Photography and Camera - Multicamera Work
**Dancing on Ice – Tom Kinane, Svend Pedersen (ITV)**; Later... with Jools Holland – Chris Rigby (BBC Two); Soapstar Superstar – Al Gurdon (ITV)	**Dancing on Ice – Paul Kirrage (ITV)**; Manchester Passion – BBC Outside Broadcasts Camera Team (BBC Three); The Bill: "Live Episode" – Sylvie Boden, Christopher Davies, Tony Keene, Donna Wiffen (ITV)
Lighting, Photography and Camera - Photography (Documentary/Factual & Non Drama Productions)	Lighting, Photography and Camera - Photography (Drama)
**Planet Earth: "From Pole to Pole" – Photography Team (BBC One)**; Arctic Crime & Punishment – Sasha Snow, David Katznelson (More4); Frontline: "The Tank Man" – Neil Harvey (More4)	**See No Evil: The Moors Murders – Lukas Strebel (ITV)**; Hotel Babylon – Sean Van Hales (BBC One); Bleak House – Kieran McGuigan (BBC One)
Make Up Design - Drama	Make Up Design - Entertainment & Non Drama Productions
**Bleak House – Daniel Phillips (BBC One)**; Riot at the Rite – Marella Shearer (BBC Two); Doctor Who – Sheelagh Wells, Neill Gorton (BBC One)	**The Catherine Tate Show: "Christmas Special" – Neill Gorton, Vanessa White (BBC Two)**; Little Britain – Lisa Cavalli-Green (BBC Three); Little Miss Jocelyn – Lisa Cavalli-Green (BBC Three)
Music - Original Score	Music - Original Title
**The Virgin Queen – Martin Phipps (BBC One)**; Bleak House – John Lunn (BBC One); Funland – David A. Hughes (BBC Three)	**Elizabeth I – Rob Lane (Channel 4)**; The Ghost Squad – Ben Bartlett (Channel 4); Bleak House – John Lunn (BBC One)
Production Design - Entertainment & Non Drama Productions	Production Design - Drama
**I'm a Celebrity...Get Me Out of Here! – Art and Trials Team (ITV)**; Green Wing – Jonathan Paul Green (Channel 4); The House of Tiny Tearaways – James Dillon (BBC Three)	**ShakespeaRe-Told: "Macbeth" – Jon Henson (BBC One)**; Doctor Who – Edward Thomas (BBC One); Space Race – Alan Spalding (BBC Two)
Sound - Drama	Sound - Entertainment & Non Drama Productions
**The Bill: "Live Episode" – Alison Davis, Donna Wiffen, Sylvie Boden, John Osborne (ITV)**; Ghostboat – Adam Severs, Les Honess, Helen Dickson, Lynne Hegarty (ITV); Spooks – Rudi Buckle (BBC One)	**Manchester Passion – BBC Outside Broadcasts Sound Team (BBC Three)**; Planet Earth – Andrew Wilson, Graham Wild, Kate Hopkins, Tim Owens (BBC One); Tsunami: 7 Hours on Boxing Day – Ben Baird, Gregor Lyon, Brian Howell (BBC One)
Tape & Film Editing - Documentary and Factual	Tape & Film Editing - Drama
**The Apprentice – Editing Team (BBC Two)**; Born in the USSR: 21 Up – Kim Horton (ITV); The Armstrongs – Marc Davies (BBC Two)	**Bleak House – Paul Knight (BBC One)**; Soundproof – Bill Diver (BBC Two); Funland – Tony Cranstoun, Emer Reynolds (BBC Three)
Tape & Film Editing - Entertainment & Situation Comedy	Visual Effects - Digital Effects
**I'm a Celebrity...Get Me Out of Here! – Post Production and Editing Team (ITV)**; Green Wing – Billy Sneddon, Lucien Clayton (Channel 4); Darren Brown: The Heist – Tim Thompsett (Channel 4)	**Titanic: Birth of a Legend – Red Vision (ITV)**; Doctor Who – The Mill (BBC One); Rome – Charles Darby, Barrie Hemsley, James Madigan, Joe Pavlo (HBO / BBC Two)
Visual Effects - Picture Enhancement	Visual Effects - Special Effects
**Life on Mars – Jet Omoshebi, Pepper Post Production (BBC One)**; The Somme – Dan Coles, Pepper Post Production (Channel 4); Sweeney Todd – Chris Beeton, Pepper Post Production (BBC One)	**Bodies – Neill Gorton, Rob Mayor, Millennium FX (BBC Three)**; Rome – Daniel Acon, Bill Budd, Franco Maria Salamon (HBO / BBC Two); Emmerdale – Ian Rowley (ITV)
Design & Craft Innovation	Lifetime Achievement
**Neill Gorton and Team**	**George Fenton**

=== 2005 ===
The RTS Craft and Design Awards 2005 took place on 22 November 2005 at The Savoy in London. It was hosted by Christopher Eccleston.

Costume Design - Drama	Costume Design - Entertainment and Non Drama Productions
**Casanova – Michele Clapton (BBC Three / BBC One)**; Doctor Who: "The End of the World" – Lucinda Wright (BBC One); Sex Traffic – Anushia Nieradzik (Channel 4)	**Little Britain – Annie Hardinge (BBC Three)**; The Mighty Boosh – June Nevin (BBC Three); Nathan Barley – Leonie Hartard (Channel 4)
Graphic Design - Trails and Packaging	Graphic Design - Programme Content Sequences
**UKTV Style Gardens – Dunning Eley Jones (UKTV)**; Nip/Tuck Promotion – Jon Yeo (Sky1); Channel 4 Rebrand: Council Estate – Brett Foraker, Russell Appleford, Jo Dillon, Gwilym Gwilliam (Channel 4)	**Anatomy for Beginners – Juliet Percival, Nick Curwin (Channel 4)**; Deep Jungle – Jan Golunski, Andrew Budd, Paul Clements (ITV); ITV Election 2005 – Graphic Design Team (ITV)
Graphic Design - Titles	Judges Award
**Lions Tour of New Zealand – Adam Wells (Sky Sports)**; Oxford V Cambridge Boat Race – Liquid TV (ITV); Hustle – Berger and Wyse (BBC One)	**Sunset+Vine - Channel 4 Cricket**
Lighting, Photography and Camera - Lighting for Multicamera	Lighting, Photography and Camera - Multicamera Work
**Songs of Praise: "Ely" – Bernie Davis (BBC One)**; CD:UK – Nigel Catmur (ITV)	**Flashmob: The Opera – BBC Outside Broadcasts Camera Team (BBC Three)**; Grand National – BBC Camera Team (BBC One); Flora London Marathon – BBC Camera Team (BBC One)
Lighting, Photography and Camera - Photography (Drama)	Lighting, Photography and Camera - Photography (Documentary/Factual & Non Drama)
**Casanova – Anthony Radcliffe (BBC Three / BBC One)**; Sex Traffic – Chris Seager (Channel 4); Not Only But Always – David Odd (Channel 4)	**Natural World: "Mississippi - Tales of the Last River Rat" – Neil Rettig (BBC Two)**; The Queen's Castle – Matt Reid, Matt Shaw (BBC One); Natural World: "Wild Wood" – Charlie Hamilton James, Jamie McPherson (BBC Two)
Make Up Design - Entertainment and Non Drama Productions	Make Up Design - Drama
**Little Britain – Lisa Cavalli-Green (BBC Three)**; Dead Ringers – Kate Benton, Diane Chenery-Wickens (BBC Two); French and Saunders – Maralyn Sherman (BBC One)	**Help – Vanessa White, Neill Gorton (BBC Two)**; Doctor Who: "The End of the World" – Davy Jones, Neill Gorton (BBC One); The Rotters' Club – Emma Scott (BBC Two)
Music Awards - Original Score	Music Awards - Original Title Music
**Green Wing – Jonathan Whitehead (Channel 4)**; BBC Wildlife Specials: "Bears: Spy in the Woods" – Will Gregory, Stuart Gordon (Channel 4); Arena: "Bacon's Arena" – Brian Eno (BBC Four)	**Playing It Straight – Jamie Forsyth, Brian Beacock (Channel 4)**; Animal Crime Scene – Sarah Class (BBC One); Sherlock Holmes and the Case of the Silk Stocking – Adrian Johnston (BBC One)
Production Design - Drama	Production Design - Entertainment and Non Drama Productions
**Sex Traffic – Candida Otton (Channel 4)**; To the Ends of the Earth – Donal Woods (BBC Two); Blackpool – Grenville Horner (BBC One)	**Hell's Kitchen – Design Team (ITV)**; The House of Tiny Tearaways – James Dillon (BBC Three); How to Sleep Better – Richard Plumb (BBC One)
Sound - Drama	Sound - Entertainment and Non Drama Productions
**Murder Prevention – Nigel Edwards, Nick Cox, Phil Barnes, Zane Hayward (Five)**; The Girl in the Café – Simon Okin, Stuart Hilliker, Jamie McPhee, Pat Boxhall (BBC One); Sex Traffic – Sound Team (Channel 4)	**Flashmob: The Opera – BBC Outside Broadcasts Sound Team (BBC Three)**; Tribe: "Kombai" – Tim Butt, Jonathan Clay (BBC Two); Hitler in Colour – Brian Aherne (ITV3)
Tape and Film Editing - Drama	Tape and Film Editing - Entertainment and Situation Comedy
**Sex Traffic – Mark Day (Channel 4)**; Dirty Filthy Love – Tania Reddin (ITV); To the Ends of the Earth – Philip Kloss (BBC Two)	**The Apprentice (British TV series) – (BBC Two)**; I'm a Celebrity...Get Me Out of Here! – Production Team (ITV); Green Wing – Billy Sneddon, Lucien Clayton (Channel 4)
Tape and Film Editing - Documentary and Factual	Visual Effects - Picture Enhancement
**Cocaine – Brand Thumim (Channel 4)**; One Life: To Courtney, with Love – Steve Barclay (BBC One); Soul Deep: The Story of Black Popular Music: "The Sound of Young America" – Ged Murphy (BBC Two)	**Victory in Europe in Colour – Stephen Moore, Ray King, Dana O'Reilly (ITV)**; Murder Prevention – Aidan Farrell (Five); Pride – Luke Rainey (BBC One)
Visual Effects - Special Effects	Visual Effects - Digital Effects
**Life Before Birth – Pioneer Productions, Toby MacDonald, David Barlow, Artem (Channel 4)**; The Brighton Bomb – Mike Tucker, Steven Bowman (BBC One); To the Ends of the Earth – Mark Holt (BBC Two)	**Pride – Dennis Michelson, Jeremy Hall, Howard Jones (BBC One)**; End Day – Gareth Edwards (BBC Three); The Last Dragon – Framestore (Channel 4)

=== 2004 ===
The RTS Crafts & Design Awards 2004 were presented on 30 November 2004 at the Savoy Hotel in London.

Costume Design - Drama	Costume Design - Entertainment & Non Drama
**Byron – Jenny Beavan (BBC Two)**; The Long Firm – James Keast (BBC Two); Charles II: The Power and the Passion – Mike O'Neill (BBC One)	**Little Britain – Annie Hardinge (BBC Three)**; Bo' Selecta! – Hannah Linnen (Channel 4); Regency House Party – Rosalind Ebbutt (Channel 4)
Design & Craft Innovation	Graphic Design - Programme Content Sequences
**Animal Games – John Downer Productions Craft Team (BBC One)**; The Theatre of News – ITV News Team (ITV); Hustle – The Production Team, Bharat Nalluri, The Senate Visual Effects (BBC One)	**Animal Games – Howard Jones, Carl Chittenden, Anna Fuller, Neill Jones (BBC One)**; The Sex.com Story – Simon George, Toby Dye, Ben Devlin, Nigel Leigh (Five); Terry Jones' Medieval Lives – Piers Helm (BBC Two)
Graphic Design - Titles	Graphic Design - Trails & Packaging
**West Indies Cricket – Mark Hyde, Mark Holland (Sky Sports)**; The Long Firm – Ray Leek, Interfield (BBC Two); That'll Teach 'Em – Julia Miranda (Channel 4)	**Brainiac: Science Abuse – Antoine Piazza (Sky1)**; 1000 Years of History – Richard Acton (UKTV); UEFA Euro 2004 Advertising Campaign – BBC Sport Marketing, DFGW, BBC Broadcast, Bermuda Shorts (BBC)
Lighting, Photography & Camera - Lighting for Multicamera	Lighting, Photography & Camera - Multicamera Work
**Fashion Rocks – Al Gurdon (Channel 4)**; Coupling – Martin Kempton (BBC Two); Crisis Command: Could You Run the Country? – Jamie Cairney (BBC Two)	**Open Golf 2004 – BBC Outside Broadcasts Camera Team (BBC Sport)**; The Bill: "Live Episode" – Camera Team (ITV); Fashion Rocks – David Mallet (Channel 4)
Lighting, Photography & Camera - Photography Documentary & Factual & Non Drama Production	Lighting, Photography & Camera - Photography Drama
**Arena: "Searching for the Wrong-Eyed Jesus" – Andrew Douglas (BBC Four)**; Natural World: "Elephant Cave" (BBC Two); Real Life: Childrens of the Miners' Strike – Mark Stokes (ITV)	**Canterbury Tales: "The Man of Law's Tale" – Sean Bobbitt (BBC One)**; Pleasureland – David Katznelson (Channel 4); Shameless – Tony Slater Ling (Channel 4)
Make Up Design - Drama	Make Up Design - Entertainment & Non Drama
**Bodies – Davy Jones, Lin Davie (BBC Three)**; Prime Suspect: "The Last Witness" – David Myers (ITV); Charles II: The Power and the Passion – Karen Hartley-Thomas (BBC One)	**Little Britain – Lisa Cavalli-Green (BBC Three)**; Dunkirk – Anne Oldham (BBC Two); The Catherine Tate Show – Vanessa White (BBC Two)
Music - Original Score	Music - Original Title Music
**The Boy who Plays on the Buddhas of Bamiyan – Dimitri Tchamouroff (Five)**; Whatever – Dunstan Bruce (Channel 4); The Long Firm – Rob Lane (BBC Two)	**Little Britain – David Arnold (BBC Three)**; I'm a Celebrity...Get Me Out of Here! – Grant Buckerfield (ITV); Five Idents – Michael Nyman (Five)
Production Design - Drama	Production Design - Entertainment & Non Drama Productions
**DoNovAn – Margaret Coombes (ITV)**; Byron – John-Paul Kelly (BBC Two); The Young Visiters – Malcolm Thornton (BBC One)	**Jungle Run – Nick King (CITV)**; Seven Wonders of the Industrial World: "The Great Ship" – Alan Spalding (BBC Two); Hell's Kitchen – Markus Blee (ITV)
Sound - Drama	Sound - Entertainment & Non Drama Productions
**The Long Firm – Richard Manton, Paul Hamblin, Graham Headicar, Catherine Hodgson (BBC Two)**; Charles II: The Power and the Passion – John Taylor, Paul Hamblin, Catherine Hodgson, Lee Crichlow (BBC One); The Mayor of Casterbridge – Tim Fraser, Michael Cordern, Lee Taylor (ITV)	**Massive Nature: "The Crossing" – Kate Hopkins, Martyn Harries, Sound Team (BBC One)**; Japan's War – Brian Aherne (Channel 4); Dunkirk – Stuart Bruce, Bob Jackson, Tom O'Pray, Phil Barnes (BBC Two)
Tape & Film Editing - Documentary & Factual	Tape & Film Editing - Drama
**D-Day – Peter Parnham (BBC One)**; The National Trust – (BBC Two / BBC Four); The Third World War: Al Qaeda - The Breeding Grounds – Peter Norrey (BBC Two)	**Holy Cross – Colin Goudie (BBC Northern Ireland)**; Charles II: The Power and the Passion – Paul Tothill (BBC One); The Young Visiters – (BBC One)
Tape & Film Editing - Entertainment & Situation Comedy	Picture Enhancement
**Two Pints of Lager and a Packet of Crisps: "The Musical" – Mark Lawrence (BBC Three)**; Bo' Selecta! – Charlie Fawcett, Simon Hornbrook (Channel 4)	**Man of Iron – Aidan Farrell (Channel 4)**; Japan's War – Stephen Moore, Gerry Gedge, John McLaren, Chris Watson (Channel 4); Human Mutants – Aidan Farrell (Channel 4)
Visual Effects - Special Effects	Visual Effects - Digital Effects
**Omagh – Team FX and Kevin Byrne (Channel 4)**; Horizon: "Last Flight of Columbia" (BBC Two); Henry VIII – Lee Sheward (ITV)	**Island of War – Clear, 3 Sixty Media (ITV)**; Animal Games – Howard Jones, Carl Chittenden, Anna Fuller, Neill Jones (BBC One); 2004 Summer Olympics Title Sequence – Visual Effects Team (BBC One)

=== 2003 ===
Costume Design - Drama	Costume Design - Entertainment & Non Drama
**The Lost Prince – Odile Dicks-Mireaux (BBC One)**; Cutting It – Michael Johnson (BBC One); Daniel Deronda – Mike O'Neill (BBC One)	**Little Britain – Annie Hardinge (BBC Three / BBC Two)**; Gladiator: Benn v Eubank – Stephen Adnitt (Five); The Boosh – Annie Hardinge (BBC Three)
Design & Craft Innovation	Graphic Design - Programme Content Sequences
**BBC Wildlife Specials: "Elephants: Spy in the Herd" – John Downer, Michael W Richards, Geoffrey Bell, Stuart Napier (BBC One)**; BBC Wildlife Specials: "Smart Sharks: Swimming with Roboshark" – Mark Brownlow, Andrew Sneath (BBC One); Channel 4 News – Channel 4 News Production Team (Channel 4)	**Smash Hits Awards – Rob Hifle, Jason Mullings (Channel 4)**; Collision Course – BBC Post Production Design Bristol (BBC); Monsters We Met – BBC Post Production Design Bristol (BBC)
Graphic Design - Titles	Graphic Design - Trails & Packaging
**What the World Thinks of America – Dimitri Kevgas (BBC Two)**; Great Britons – Paul Tigwell (BBC Two); Restoration – Tim Varlow (BBC Two)	**BBC Three Brand Identity – Brand Identity Team (BBC Three)**; BBC Two Brand Identity – Brand Identity Team (BBC Two); BBC Two – Lambie Nairn (BBC Two)
Lighting, Photography & Camera - Lighting for Multicamera	Lighting, Photography & Camera - Multicamera Work
**Re:covered – Darryl Noad (BBC Choice)**; I'm Alan Partridge – Martin Kempton (BBC Two); Songs of Praise: "Salisbury Christmas" – Geoff Stafford (BBC One)	**The Abyss - Live – Camera Team (BBC)**; Re:covered – Chris Howe, Ben Frewin, Jim Parsons, Rachel Squire (BBC Choice); Wild in Your Garden – Production and Camera Team (BBC)
Lighting, Photography & Camera - Photography Documentary & Factual & Non Drama Production	Lighting, Photography & Camera - Photography Drama
**The Last Peasants – Roger Chapman (Channel 4)**; Natural World: "My Halcyon River" – Charlie Hamilton-James, Jamie McPherson (BBC Two); Fighting the War – Camera Team (BBC Two)	**State of Play – Chris Seager (BBC One)**; Messiah 2: Vengeance is Mine – Alan Almond (BBC One); Dr. Zhivago – Blasco Giurato, Chris Plevin (ITV)
Make Up Design - Drama	Make Up Design - Entertainment & Non Drama
**Cutting It – Jessica Taylor (BBC One)**; The Forsyte Saga – David Myers (ITV); Messiah 2: Vengeance is Mine – Jan Sewell (BBC One)	**Little Britain – Lisa Cavalli-Green (BBC Three / BBC Two)**; Bremner, Bird and Fortune – Helen Barrett (Channel 4); Bo' Selecta! – Leigh Francis and the Production Team (Channel 4)
Music - Original Score	Music - Original Title Music
**Daniel Deronda – Rob Lane (BBC One)**; The Second Coming – Murray Gold (ITV); Feltham Sings – DJ Dextrous (Channel 4)	**The British Empire in Colour – Chris Elliott (ITV)**; Fatboy Slim: Musical Hooligan – Norman Cook (BBC Three); Hearts of Gold – Rob Lane (BBC One)
Production Design - Drama	Production Design - Entertainment & Non Drama Productions
**Daniel Deronda – Don Taylor (BBC One)**; Hornblower – Rob Harris (ITV); State of Play – Donal Woods (BBC One)	**The Day Britain Stopped – Peter Gordon (BBC Two)**; Leonardo: The Man Who Wanted to Know Everything – Derek Brown, Michael Mosley (BBC One); Fight School – Xiang Hai Ming (Sky1)
Sound - Drama	Sound - Entertainment & Non Drama Productions
**Tomorrow La Scala! – Ian Richardson, Simon Gershon, Miriam Ludbrook, Andrew Stirk (BBC)**; State of Play – Simon Okin, Stuart Hilliker, Jamie McPhee, Pat Boxshall (BBC One); Dr. Zhivago – Sound Team (ITV)	**Fighting the War – Sound Team (BBC Two)**; The Last Peasants – Bob Jackson, Viorel Ghiocel (Channel 4); Natural World: "Cats Under Serengeti Stars" – Owen Newman, Lucy Rutherford, Andrew Wilson (BBC Two)
Tape & Film Editing - Documentary & Factual	Tape & Film Editing - Drama
**The Last Peasants – Ollie Huddleston (Channel 4)**; The Nine Lives of Alice Martineau – Mitch Baker (BBC Three)	**The Second Coming – Tony Cranstoun (ITV)**; State of Play – Mark Day (BBC One); White Teeth – Andrew Hulme (Channel 4); At a Slight Angle to the Universe – Pete Drinkwater, Peter Cook (BBC Two)
Tape & Film Editing - Entertainment & Situation Comedy	Team
**Phoenix Nights – Pete Hallworth (Channel 4)**; Early Doors – Tony Cranstoun (BBC Two); Marion and Geoff – Graham Hodson (BBC Two)	**The Last Peasants – Angus Macqueen, Roger Chapman, Claudia Murg, Iris Maor (Channel 4)**; Channel 4 News – Channel 4 News Production Team (Channel 4); The Lost Prince – Craft & Design Team (BBC One)
Picture Enhancement	Visual Effects - Special Effects
**The British Empire in Colour – Gerry Gedge, Phil Moss, Steve Moore (ITV)**; Monsters We Met – Jonathon Prosser, Adrian Woodward, BBC Post Production Design Bristol (BBC); Darwin's Daughter – Aidan Farrell (Channel 4)	**Hornblower – Tom Harris (ITV)**; Dr. Zhivago – Simon Frame, Simon Carr, Pavel Sagner (ITV); The Day Britain Stopped – Alex Gurucharri (BBC Two)
Visual Effects - Digital Effects	Judges' Award
**Walking with Dinosaurs Special – Framestore (BBC One)**; Trouble in Tahiti – Shane Warden (BBC); Tipping the Velvet – Shane Warden, Simon Giblin (BBC Two)	**I'm a Celebrity...Get Me Out of Here! Team**
Lifetime Achievement
**Brian Pearce**

=== 2002 ===
The RTS Craft and Design Awards 2002 took place on 18 November 2022 at The Savoy in London. It was hosted by Richard Whiteley.

Art Director	Costume Design - Drama
**Shackleton – Lynne Huitson, Matt Robinson (Channel 4)**; The Forsyte Saga – Nick Wilkinson (ITV); Micawber – Stephen Bradshaw	**Crime and Punishment – Rosie Hackett (BBC Two)**; The Way We Live Now – Andrea Galer (BBC One); Sunday – Barbara Kidd, Marion Weise (Channel 4)
Costume Design - Entertainment & Non-Drama Productions	Design and Craft Innovation
**Phoenix Nights – Robert Lever (Channel 4)**; Ted & Alice – Yves Barre (BBC One); Alistair McGowan's Big Impression – Kate O'Farrell (BBC One)	**Weird Nature: "Marvellous Motion" – Rod Clarke, Stephen James Downer, Tim MacMillan, Howard Jones, Carl Chittenden, Stuart Napier (BBC / Discovery Channel)**; Band of Brothers – Cinesite (HBO / BBC Two); Commonwealth Games – Paul McNeil, Andrew Peakin (BBC Sport)
Graphic Design - Programme Content Sequences	Graphic Design - Titles
**Lion Battlefield – Rob Hifle, Alan Short, Paul Greer (BBC Two / Discovery)**; Banzai – Blue Source (Channel 4); Weird Nature – John Downer Productions, BBC MediaArc (BBC / Discovery Channel)	**The Curious Gardeners – Steve Burrell, Paul Tigwell (BBC Two)**; At Home with the Braithwaites – Liquid TV (ITV); Fields of Gold – Interfield (BBC Two)
Graphic Design - Trails & Packaging	Picture Enhancement
**BBC Sport's World Cup 2002 campaign: "The Winning Team from the BBC" – Guy North (BBC Sport)**; Fifth Gear – Gus Kimber, Nol Davis (Channel 5); RHS Chelsea Flower Show – Piers Helm, Sebastian Read, Aires Brooker (BBC One / BBC Two)	**Weird Nature – Howard Jones, Carl Chittenden (BBC / Discovery Channel)**; America's War – John Davidson, Gale Franko, Stephen Moore, Sherri Scott (Channel 4 / PBS); Rasputin – Aidan Farrell (Channel 4)
Lighting, Photography & Camera - Lighting for Multicamera	Lighting, Photography & Camera - Multicamera Work
**Re:covered – Chris Rigby, Gurdip Mahal (BBC Choice)**; The Queen Mother's Funeral Service at Westminster Abbey – Chris Bretnall (BBC One); Party at the Palace – Mark Kenyon (BBC One)	**The Queen's Golden Jubilee – BBC Camera Team (BBC One)**; The Queen Mother's Funeral – BBC Camera Team (BBC One); Live Cricket Coverage – Camera Team (Channel 4)
Lighting, Photography & Camera - Photography, Documentary/Factual and Non-Drama Productions	Lighting, Photography & Camera - Photography, Drama
**The Blue Planet – Camera Team (BBC One / Discovery)**; Wild Africa – Camera Team (BBC Two / Discovery); Great Natural Wonders of the World – Peter Crawford (BBC One)	**Othello – Daf Hobson (ITV)**; Sinners – Simon Kossoff (BBC One); Crime and Punishment – Eigil Bryld (BBC Two)
Make Up Design - Entertainment and Non-Drama Productions	Make-Up Design - Drama
**The Great Plague – Veronica Brebner (Channel 4)**; Alistair McGowan's Big Impression – Eva Marieges Moore (BBC One); Dickens: "Part 3" – Kirstie Stanway (BBC Two)	**Sunday – Sue Milton, Veytie McLeod, Samantha Marshall (Channel 4)**; The Way We Live Now – Caroline Noble (BBC One); Shackleton – Jeremy Woodhead (Channel 4)
Music - Original Score	Music - Original Title Music
**Gruth is Uachdar (Crowdie & Cream) – Donald Shaw, Charlie McKerron (BBC Two Scotland)**; Murder – Nina Humphreys (BBC Two)	**Gruth is Uachdar (Crowdie & Cream) – Donald Shaw, Charlie McKerron (BBC Two Scotland)**; Nice Guy Eddie – Martin Phipps (BBC One)
Production Design - Drama	Production Design - Entertainment & Non-Drama Productions
**Crime and Punishment – Michael Carlin (BBC Two)**; Shackleton – Michael Howells (Channel 4); Othello – Malcolm Thornton (ITV)	**The Experiment – Richard Plumb (BBC Two)**; Alistair McGowan's Big Impression – Harry Banks (BBC One); Phoenix Nights – Jim Holloway (Channel 4)
Sound - Drama	Sound - Entertainment & Non-Drama Productions
**Othello – Maurice Hillier, Colin Martin (ITV)**; Spooks – Julian Slater, Nigel Heath, Michael Fentum, Dan Morgan (BBC One); The Way We Live Now – Sound Team (BBC One)	**The Queen's Golden Jubilee – BBC Sound Team (BBC One)**; When She Died... Death of a Princess – Chris Duncan-Brown, Mike Hatch, Limo Hearn, Tony Harrison, Tim Handley, David Woolley (Channel 4); Natural World: "A Wild Dog's Story" – Lucy Rutherford, Martyn Harries (BBC Two)
Tape and Film Editing - Documentary & Factual	Tape and Film Editing - Drama
**The Blue Planet – Martin Elsbury, Jo Payne, Tim Coope, Alan Hoida (BBC One / Discovery)**; Sport Relief Appeal Films – Stewart Barlow (BBC One); Battlecentre – Paul van Dyck (Channel 4)	**Crime and Punishment – Chris Gill (BBC Two)**; The Way We Live Now – Mark Day (BBC One); As the Beast Sleeps – Paul Endacott (BBC Two)
Tape and Film Editing - Entertainment & Situation Comedy	Team Award
**Phoenix Nights – Pete Hallworth (Channel 4)**; Alistair McGowan's Big Impression – Richard Halladey (BBC One); Pop Idol – Marc Corrance (ITV / ITV2)	**Walking with Beasts – Framestore (BBC One)**; Alistair McGowan's Big Impression – Production Team (BBC One); The Edwardian Country House – Caroline Ross Pirie, Nicky Murphy, Chris Hartley, Steve Bowden, Martin Johnson, Daniel Pemberton (Channel 4)
Visual Effects - Digital	Visual Effects - Special
**Band of Brothers – Angus Bickerton, Cinesite (HBO / BBC Two)**; Walking with Beasts – Framestore (BBC One); Weird Nature – Howard Jones, Carl Chittenden (BBC / Discovery Channel)	**Hornblower – Tom Harris (ITV)**; Night Flight – Bob Hollow, Martin Geeson, Perry Brahan, Andrew Turley (BBC One); The Trench – Chris Reynolds (BBC Two)
Judges' Award	Lifetime Achievement Award
**The craft members of the BBC OB Department for an outstanding year in Event coverage**	**Eileen Diss**

=== 2001 ===
The RTS Craft and Design Awards 2001 took place on 29 November 2001 at London Hilton on Park Lane in London. It was hosted by Richard Wilson.

Art Director	Costume Design - Drama
**The Royle Family – Rachel Pierce (BBC One)**	**The Life and Adventures of Nicholas Nickleby – Barbara Kidd (ITV)**; Perfect Strangers – Anushia Nieradzik (BBC Two); In a Land of Plenty – Pam Tait, Dinah Collins (BBC Two)
Costume Design - Entertainment & Non-Drama Productions	Design and Craft Innovation
**Human Remains – Fiona Chilcott (BBC Two)**; Owen Wingrave – Doreen Watkinson (Channel 4); Victoria Wood with All the Trimmings – Yves Barre (BBC One)	**Space – Production and Graphics Team (BBC One)**; General Election: "Vote 2001 Interactive" – (BBC); Wimbledon Interactive & The Open Interactive – Patrick Dalzell, Martin Hopkins (BBC Sport)
Graphic Design - Programme Content Sequences	Graphic Design - Titles
**Venom – Steve Burrell, Alan Short, Paul Greer (BBC One)**; General Election – Mike Afford, Stephanie Chappell, Erika Kraftchenko, Steve Hart, Sean Kirwan (BBC); Inside the Kill Box: Fighting the Gulf War – Luke Wilmot, Charles Golding (Discovery Channel)	**A Very British Murder – John Durrant (Channel 4)**; That Gay Show – Rob Hifle, Carys Hull (BBC Choice); Catching the Killers – Carys Hull, Paul Tigwell (BBC Two)
Graphic Design - Trails & Packaging
**Sin Bin – Steve Cope (BBC Choice)**; Grandstand On Air Promos – Julian Gibbs (BBC One); UK Horizons – Jason Keeley, Marcus Jones, Brian Eley, Linda Farley, Ursula Capell, Howard Bell, Phil Hurrell, Jo Glassman (UKTV)
Lighting, Photography & Camera - Lighting for Multicamera	Lighting, Photography & Camera - Multicamera Work
**SM:TV Live / CD:UK – Chris Owen, Tom Kinane (ITV)**; EastEnders – Roger Francis (BBC One); Bowie at the BBC – David Gibson (BBC Two)	**Kumbh Mela – Balbir Tikari, Madhurita Negi, Patrick Mark, Mike Yorke, Brett Turnbull, Graham Day, Surinder Puri (Channel 4)**; EastEnders – John Corby (BBC One); Sydney 2000: "Host Broadcaster Coverage of Track Athletics" – Robin Sutherland, BBC Resources Camera Supervisor and his team (BBC Sport)
Lighting, Photography & Camera - Photography, Documentary/Factual and Non-Drama Productions	Lighting, Photography & Camera - Photography, Drama
**Beneath the Veil – James Miller (Channel 4)**; Natural World: "Cheeky Monkey" – Barrie Britton (BBC Two); Andes to Amazon: "Lost Worlds" – Karen Bass (BBC Two)	**Men Only – Julian Court (Channel 4)**; Never Never – David Odd (Channel 4); The Russian Bride – David Higgs (ITV)
Make Up Design - Entertainment and Non-Drama Productions	Make-Up Design - Drama
**Human Remains – Vanessa White (BBC Two)**; Victoria Wood with All the Trimmings – Christina Baker (BBC One)	**Sword of Honour – Annie Oldham (Channel 4)**; Perfect Strangers – Dorka Nieradzik (BBC Two); The Cazalets – Elaine Smith (BBC One)
Music - Original Score	Music - Original Title Music
**Sword of Honour – Nina Humphreys (Channel 4)**; Britain at War in Colour – Chris Elliott (ITV); The Glass – Richard G. Mitchell (ITV)	**Murder in Mind – Brian Bennett (BBC One)**; Britain at War in Colour – Chris Elliott (ITV); Brass Eye – Jonathan Whitehead, Christopher Morris (Channel 4)
Picture Manipulation	Production Design - Drama
**Australia: Beyond the Fatal Shore: "Money, Class & Power" – Aidan Farrell (BBC)**; Hell in the Pacific – Ross Baker, Pepper Post Production, Michael Sanders, The Edit Store (Channel 4); Britain at War in Colour – Stephen Moore, Phil Moss, Gerry Gedge (ITV)	**Sword of Honour – Ben Scott (Channel 4)**; Cold Feet – Chris Truelove (ITV); Look and Read: "Zzaap and the Word Master" – Alan Spalding (BBC One)
Production Design - Entertainment & Non-Drama Productions	Sound - Drama
**Big Brother – Colin Piggot (Channel 4)**; Vote 2001: "The Veredict" – Christopher George (BBC One); Building the Impossible: The Seven Wonders of the Ancient World – Peter Findley (BBC)	**Cold Feet – Nick Steer, John Rutherford, Jack Dardis, Andy Wyatt (ITV)**; Tough Love – Derek Norman, Richard Fettes, Glenn Calder (ITV); Sword of Honour – Richard Manton, Adrian Rhodes, Andy Kennedy, Andre Schmid (Channel 4)
Sound - Entertainment & Non-Drama Productions	Tape and Film Editing - Documentary & Factual
**Hell in the Pacific – Peter Eason, Craig Butters, Cliff Jones (Channel 4)**; Natural World: "Transylvania... Living with Predators" – Lucy Rutherford, Martyn Harries, Dominic Partridge, Ciprian Parvel (BBC Two); Hot Wax: Boys with Fast Toys – Nicholas Mottershead (BBC)	**Japanese Suicide – Martin Cooper (Channel 4)**; I Love 1983 – Ian Wilson (BBC Two); After They Were Famous: "The Sound of Music Children" – Claire Storey (ITV)
Tape and Film Editing - Drama	Team Award
**As If – Barney Pilling (Channel 4)**; Perfect Strangers – Paul Tothill (BBC Two); Never Never – Chris Gill (Channel 4)	**Doctors: "The Waiting Game" – Design Team (BBC One)**; Popstars (ITV); Comic Relief – Mark Lawrence, Peter Drinkwater, Andrew Garnett, Carol Abbott, Vicky Pugh, Al Gurdon, Tony Revell, Nigel Saunders, Simon Kimmel, Sarah Fraser, Nick Peto, Andrew Hassenruck (BBC One)
Visual Effects - Digital	Visual Effects - Special
**Space – Derek Wentworth, Steve Cooper (BBC One)**; Planet Storm – Avi Musel, Alex Olegnowicz, Effi Wizen (Channel 4)	**Lorna Doone – Colin Gorry (BBC One)**; Neanderthal – BBC Resources (Channel 4); Jim Henson's Construction Site – Jamie Courtier (ITV)
Judges' Award	Lifetime Achievement Award
**General Election Team (BBC)**	**Peter Jackson**

=== 2000 ===
Costume Design - Drama	Costume Design - Entertainment & Non Drama
**Warriors – James Keast (BBC One)**; Gormenghast – Odile Dicks-Mireaux (BBC Two); This Is Personal: The Hunt for the Yorkshire Ripper – Ray Holman (ITV)	**The League of Gentlemen – Yves Barre (BBC Two)**; Elizabeth – Anna Palmgren (Channel 4); Zig Zag: A Walk Through Time – Eric Doughney (BBC Two)
Design & Craft Innovation	Graphic Design - Programme Content Sequences
**Walking with Dinosaurs – Mike Milne, Jez Harris (BBC One)**; Best Laid Plans: "Military Blunders" – Peter Farrer (Channel 4); Big Brother – Colin Pigott (Channel 4)	**Predators – Rob Hifle, Alan Short, Stefan Marjoram (BBC One)**; Skyscrapers, Bridges and Tunnels – Luke Wilmot, Andy Wheeler, Dave Corfield, Howard Moses (Discovery Channel); Liquid News – Chyaz Buffett, Liz Vinson (BBC Choice / BBC News 24)
Graphic Design - Titles	Graphic Design - Trails & Packaging
**Da Ali G Show – Garth Jennings, Dan Mazer (Channel 4)**; Holby City – Sean De Sparengo, Richard Gort (BBC One); Modern Times – John Durrant (BBC Two)	**Don't Mention the Score – Simon Pullinger (ONdigital)**; Box Office Made Easy – Mark Blackwood, Matthew Unwin, Jon McCellan (BSkyB); Raising the Mammoth – Andrew Hunter, Howard Jones (Discovery Channel)
Lighting, Photography & Camera - Documentary & Factual and Non Drama Productions	Lighting, Photography & Camera - Lighting for Multicamera
**Out of Africa – Sorious Samura (Channel 4)**; Survival: "Tale of the Tides: The Hyaena & The Mudskipper" – Mark Deeble, Victoria Stone (ITV); The Curse of the Methuselah Tree – Mike Coles (Channel 4)	**SM:TV Live / CD:UK – Tom Kinane, Alan Fawcus (ITV)**; La Traviata – Vittorio Storaro (Channel 4); Figaro Live – Chris Clayton (BBC Two)
Lighting, Photography & Camera - Multicamera Work	Lighting, Photography & Camera - Photography Drama
**Big Brother – Michael Lingard, Simon Staffurth (Channel 4)**; Figaro Live – Martin Hawkins (BBC Two); Millennium Concert: Ely Cathedral – James Day (BBC Two)	**Gormenghast – Gavin Finney (BBC Two)**; Anna Karenina – Ryszard Lenczewski (Channel 4); Nature Boy – David Higgs (BBC Two)
Make Up Design - Drama	Make Up Design - Entertainment & Non Drama
**Wives and Daughters – Lisa Westcott (BBC One)**; Longitude – Chrissie Beveridge (Channel 4); Warriors – Ann Oldham (BBC One)	**Alistair McGowan's Big Impression – Heather Squire (BBC One)**; Bremner, Bird and Fortune – Helen Barrett (Channel 4)
Music - Original Score	Music - Original Title Music
**Warriors – Debbie Wiseman (BBC One)**; Monsignor Renard – John E. Keane (ITV); Summer in the Suburbs – John Harle (BBC Two)	**The League of Gentlemen – Joby Talbot (BBC Two)**; BBC Two Idents – Anthony Sadler, Gaynor Sadler (BBC Two); Clocking Off – Murray Gold (BBC Two)
Picture Manipulation	Production Design - Drama
**The Second World War in Colour – Phil Moss, Gerry Gedge, Steve Moore, Maggie Choyce (ITV)**; The Day the World Took Off: "Episode 1" – Aiden Farrell (Channel 4); Walking with Dinosaurs – Tim Greenwood, Mike McGee (BBC One)	**Gormenghast – Christopher Hobbs (BBC Two)**; Warriors – Phil Roberson (BBC One); Longitude – Eileen Diss, Chris Lowe (Channel 4)
Production Design - Entertainment & Non Drama Productions	Sound - Drama
**The League of Gentlemen – Grenville Horner (BBC Two)**; La Traviata – Vittorio Storaro, Giuseppe Patroni Griffi (Channel 4); Blue Peter – Ross Dempster (BBC One)	**Warriors – Maurice Hillier, Danny Longhurst, Graham Headicar, David Old (BBC One)**; Anna Karenina – Danny Longhurst, Pat Boxshall, Stan di Maio, Jennie Evans, Jamie McPhee, Stuart Hilliker, Steve Phillips (Channel 4); This Is Personal: The Hunt for the Yorkshire Ripper – Bill Dodkin (ITV)
Sound - Entertainment & Non Drama Productions	Tape & Film Editing - Documentary & Factual
**Figaro Live – Tim Summerhayes, John Middleton (BBC Two)**; Living Britain: "Winter Reflections" – Martyn Harries, Lucy Rutherford (BBC Two); Jam – Nigel Heath, Arthur Graley, Julian Slater (Channel 4)	**A Wedding in the Family – Dave King (Channel 4)**; Paying the Price: Killing the Children of Iraq – Joe Frost (ITV); Staying Lost – Paul Carlin (Channel 4)
Tape & Film Editing - Drama	Tape & Film Editing - Entertainment & Situation Comedy
**David Copperfield – Philip Kloss (BBC One)**; The Visitor – Victoria Boydell (Channel 4); Tinsel Town – James Hamilton, Phyllis Ironside (BBC Two)	**Who Wants to Be a Millionaire? – Perry Widdowson, Paul Richmond, Steve Murray, Peter Spink (ITV)**; Jam – Matt Wood, Marvin Young (Channel 4)
Team	Visual Effects
**Big Brother – Richard Hopkins, Ruth Wrigley, Conrad Green (Channel 4)**; Survival: "Tale of the Tides: The Hyaena & The Mudskipper" – Production team (ITV); Walking with Dinosaurs – Production team (BBC One)	**Alice in Wonderland – Framestore (Channel 4)**; Arabian Nights – Framestore (BBC One); Walking with Dinosaurs – Framestore (BBC One)
Judges' Award	Lifetime Achievement
**Framestore**	**Edward Roberts**

=== 1999 ===
Costume Design - Drama	Design & Craft Innovation
**Shooting the Past – Susannah Buxton (BBC Two)**; Queer as Folk – Pam Tait (Channel 4); Aristocrats – James Keast (BBC One)	**Supernatural: The Unseen Powers of Animals – John Downer, Mark Brownlow, Rod Clarke, Steve Downer, Sarah Grigg, James Honeyborne, Howard Jones, Susan Macmillan, Tim Macmillan (BBC One)**; Channel 4 News – Jim Gray & Team (Channel 4); ITN News on ITV – Nigel Dacre & Team (ITV)
Graphic Design - Channel Idents	Graphic Design - Programme Content Sequences
**Christmas on BBC 2 – Jane Wyatt, Sean De Sparengo (BBC Two)**; ITV2 – Darrell Pockett, David Chaudoir (ITV2); [.TV] – Sten Sheppard, Nick Tarte, Matthew Unwin (BSkyB)	**Supernatural: The Unseen Powers of Animals – Sarah Grigg, Howard Jones, Marlon Griffin (BBC One)**; Newsnight – Resources Graphic Design (BBC Two); Body Story – Leanne Klein, Alex Graham, Chris Hart (Channel 4)
Graphic Design - Titles	Judges' Award
**Mad for It – Paul Baguley (Carlton)**; Violent Planet – Marlon Griffin, James Hall, Howard Jones (BBC One); Budweiser Sponsorship - American Classics – Paul Butler, Esther Clarke (BSkyB)	**Cosgrove Hall Films**
Lighting, Photography & Camera - Lighting for Multicamera	Lighting, Photography & Camera - Multicamera Work
**Masterworks: "Vaughan Williams" – Bernie Davis (BBC Two)**; Channel 4 News – Hugh French (Channel 4); Smart – Dave Davey (BBC One)	**Gladiators – Camera Team (ITV)**; Masterworks: "Six Pieces of Britain" – Colin Case, James Day, David Brice, Matthew Woodward, Steve Plant, Alan Smith (BBC Two); The Royal Wedding – Steve Hall and BBC Resources Camera Team (BBC One / ITV / BSkyB)
Lighting, Photography & Camera - Photography Documentary & Factual & Non Drama Production	Lighting, Photography & Camera - Photography Drama
**Kosovo: The Valley – Jacek Petrycki (Channel 4)**; The Real Merlin – Andrew Muggleton (Channel 4); Polar Bears: Hunters on Ice – Richard Kemp, John Waters, Per Magne Jensen, Jeff Foott, James Gray, Jeff Goodman (ITV)	**Great Expectations – David Odd (BBC Two)**; Frenchman's Creek – Chris Seager (Carlton); Touching Evil – James Welland (ITV)
Make Up - Drama	Make Up - Non-Drama
**Girls' Night – Ann Humphreys (Granada Film)**; Shooting the Past – Penny Smith (BBC Two); Aristocrats – Lesley Lamont-Fisher (BBC One)	**The Greatest Rory Ever Told – Helen Barrett (Channel 4)**; Stars in Their Eyes – Glenda Wood (ITV)
Music - Original Score	Music - Original Title Music
**Queer as Folk – Murray Gold (Channel 4)**; Vanity Fair – Murray Gold (BBC Two); The Planets – Jim Meacock (BBC Two)	**Reckless: The Movie – Hal Lindes (ITV)**; Butterfly Collectors – Jocelyn Pook, Philip Appleby (ITV); BBC TV News 2000 – David Lowe (BBC One)
Production Design - Drama	Production Design - Entertainment & Non-Drama
**Great Expectations – Alice Normington (BBC Two)**; The Last Train – Stephen Fineren (ITV); Shooting the Past – John-Paul Kelly (BBC Two)	**Channel 4 News – Simon Jago (Channel 4)**
Sound - Drama	Sound - Entertainment & Non Drama
**Great Expectations – Richard Manton, Peter Smith, Bernard O'Reilly, Terry Brown (BBC Two)**; The Last Train – John Whitworth, Phil Smith, Elizabeth Price, John Senior (ITV); Trust – Reg Mills, Glenn Calder, Kathy Rodwell, Keith Tunney (ITV)	**Kosovo: The Valley – Patrick Boland (Channel 4)**; White Lives – Andy Wyatt, Michael Lax, John Rutherford (Channel 4); Lockerbie: A Night Remembered – David Lindsey, Matt Skilton (Channel 4)
Tape & Film Editing - Documentary & Factual	Tape & Film Editing - Drama
**Malcolm and Barbara: A Love Story – Kim Horton (ITV)**; Nurse – Fred Hart (BBC Two); Supernatural: The Unseen Powers of Animals – Stuart Napier (BBC One)	**Bones and Silence: "Dalziel and Pascoe" – Beverley Mills (BBC One)**; Great Expectations – Chris Gill (BBC Two); Shot Through the Heart – Tim Wellburn (BBC Two)
Tape & Film Editing - Entertainment & Situation Comedy	Team
**The Royle Family – Tony Cranstoun (BBC Two)**; Bostock's Cup – Steve Tempia (ITV); Cold Feet – Edward Mansell (ITV)	**Masterworks: "Six Pieces of Britain" (BBC Two)**; The Woman in White (BBC One); The Bill (ITV)

=== 1997/1998 ===
Camera - Documentary & Factual, Arts & Music	Camera - Drama, Entertainment & Events
**Travelog: "Marrakesh" – Andrew Muggleton (Channel 4)**; Travelog: "Costa Rica" (Channel 4); Later... with Jools Holland - The 4th Annual Jools Hootenanny (BBC Two)	**The Tenant of Wildfell Hall – Daf Hobson (BBC One)**; Touching Evil (ITV); Skin
Costume Design - Drama	Design & Craft Innovation
**Plotlands – Les Lansdown (BBC One)**; Bramwell (ITV); Performance: "Macbeth on the Estate" (BBC Two)	**Soho Stories – Chris Terrill (BBC Two)**; Touring Cars; ReBoot
Graphic Design - Channel Idents	Graphic Design - Programme Content Sequences
**Bravo Idents – Andy Godden (Bravo)**; Carlton Idents (Carlton)	**General Election – Mike Afford, Ceri Kashita (BBC)**; Brass Eye (Channel 4); Bullying: A Survival Guide (BBC Two)
Graphic Design - Titles	Judges' Award
**Bully – Steve Burrell (BBC)**; 5 News (Channel 5); The Girlie Show (Channel 4)	**Channel 5 Branding**
Lighting - Drama	Make Up Design - Drama
**Cruel Train – Sean Van Hales (BBC Two)**; Touching Evil (ITV); Performance: "Broken Glass" (BBC Two)	**Brazen Hussies – Caroline Noble (BBC Two)**; The Bill (ITV); Bramwell (ITV)
Lighting - Any Other Programme	Make Up Design - Any Other Programme
**Red Dwarf – Peter Morgan (BBC Two)**	**Stanley Baxter in Reel Terms – Eve Wignall (Channel 4)**
Music - Original Score	Music - Original Title
**The Tenant of Wildfell Hall – Richard G. Mitchell (BBC One)**; King Girl (BBC Two); Born to Run (BBC One)	**Howard Goodall's Organ Works – Howard Goodall (Channel 4)**; Hetty Wainthropp Investigates (BBC One); Wycliffe (ITV)
Production Design - Any Other Programme	Production Design - Drama
**Megamaths – Shaun Moore (BBC Two)**; General Election (BBC); 5 News (Channel 5)	**The Tenant of Wildfell Hall – Sarah Greenwood (BBC One)**; Brazen Hussies (BBC Two); The Fortunes and Misfortunes of Moll Flanders (ITV)
Sound - Any Other Programme	Sound - Drama
**True Stories: "In Search of Lawrence" – Steve Phillips (Channel 4)**; Q.E.D.: "The True Story of the Elephant Man" (BBC One); Full Circle with Michael Palin (BBC One)	**No Child of Mine – Maurice Hillier (ITV)**; The Fragile Heart (Channel 4); Common As Muck (BBC One)
Tape & Film Editing - Documentary & Factual	Tape & Film Editing - Drama
**Modern Times: "Mange Tout" – Stuart Briggs (BBC Two)**; True Stories: "The Grave" (Channel 4); Short Stories: "The Flying Scrapman" (Channel 4)	**Touching Evil – Chris Gill, Sue Wyatt (ITV)**; Hillsborough (ITV); The Fortunes and Misfortunes of Moll Flanders (ITV)
Team	Visual Effects
**5 News (Channel 5)**; Promenade Concert: "Chicago Symphony" / "Sir Georg Solti" (BBC); The Tenant of Wildfell Hall (BBC One)	**London's Burning – Tom Harris (ITV)**; Bugs (BBC One); 999: "Missing in Action" (BBC One)

== See also ==
- Royal Television Society Programme Awards
- British Academy Television Craft Awards
