= British Academy Television Award for Best Specialist Factual =

Annual UK television award

British Academy Television Award
- Country: United Kingdom
- Presented by: British Academy of Film and Television Arts
- First award: 1965
- Currently held by: Atomic People (2025)
- Website: http://www.bafta.org/

The British Academy Television Award for Best Specialist Factual Programme is one of the major categories of the British Academy Television Awards (BAFTAs), the primary awards ceremony of the British television industry. According to the BAFTA website, the category is "specifically for arts, religion, history, natural history and science programmes or series and can include both factual and performance programmes."

The category has gone through several changes in name and type of nominees considered for the category:

- It was first awarded as Best Specialized Programme from 1965 to 1972 and then as Best Specialized Programme from 1973 to 1977. Also, another category was presented during similar years, the Best Specialized Series (from 1973 to 1976).
- From 1980 to 1985, the Best Programme/Series without Category was presented.
- A category for just arts programming was presented as Huw Wheldon Award for Best Arts Programme from 1987 to 2000.
- Then, from 2001 to 2004 it received the name Huw Wheldon Award For Specialised Programme or Series.
- Since 2005 the category is named Best Specialist Factual.

== Winners and nominees ==
=== 1960s ===
Best Specialized Programme

| Year | Recipient(s) | Title |
|---|---|---|
| 1965 | Ned Sherrin | |
| 1966 | Peter Watkins | Culloden |
| 1966 | Gerry Anderson | Stingray |
| 1966 | Ken Russell | Debussy/Douanier Rousseau |
| 1966 | Humphrey Burton | Workshop: Goetterdaemmerung; Eroica; Michael Tippett; Liverpool Conducting Competition; Our World of Opera |
| 1967 | Ken Russell | |
| 1968 | Basil Coleman | |
| 1969 | Jack Gold | The World of Coppard |

=== 1970s ===
Best Specialized Programme

| Year | Title | Recipient(s) |
|---|---|---|
| 1970 | Blue Peter | Biddy Baxter, Edward Barnes, Rosemary Gill |
| 1970 | Girls Wanted Istanbul | Wendy Toye |
| 1970 | Omnibus: "A Dream Divided"; Omnibus: "Down These Mean Streets A Man Must Go" | Fred Burnley |
| 1970 | Civilisation | Michael Gill, Peter Montagnon |
| 1970 | The Goshawk | David Cobham |
| 1970 | Omnibus | Norman Swallow |
| 1970 | Omnibus: "Woman from the Shadows"; Omnibus: "The Confessions of Marian Evans" | Don Taylor |
| 1971 | On Trial: The Chicago Conspiracy Trial | Christopher Burstall |
| 1971 | Omnibus: "A Requiem For Modigliani" | Fred Burnley |
| 1971 | Omnibus: "Dance of The Seven Veils" | Ken Russell |
| 1971 | Omnibus: "I Regret Nothing" | Michael Houldey |
| 1971 | Aquarius | Humphrey Burton and the Production Team |
| 1972 | Omnibus | Norman Swallow |
| 1972 | Bird's Eye View: A Land for All Seasons | John Bird |
| 1972 | The Issue Should Be Avoided | Robert Vas |
| 1972 | The Search for the Nile | Christopher Ralling |

Best Specialized Programme

| Year | Title | Recipient(s) |
|---|---|---|
| 1973 | Omnibus: "Vincent The Dutchman - Van Gogh" | Mai Zetterling and the Production Team |
| 1973 | Omnibus: "Who Needs a Conductor - André Previn" | Herbert Chappell |
| 1973 | Who Sank The Lusitania? | Paul Bonner |
| 1974 | Omnibus: "Colette - A Window on the War" | Colin Nears |
| 1974 | Aquarius: "Hello Dali" | Bruce Gowers |
| 1974 | Second House: A Long Drawn-Out Trip | Gerald Scarfe |
| 1974 | Times of Bronze and Jade | Michael Gill |
| 1975 | Horizon: "Joey" | Brian Gibson |
| 1975 | Omnibus: "Joseph Conrad" | Colin Nears |
| 1975 | Omnibus: "The Goldwyn Touch" | Gavin Millar |
| 1975 | The Sun is God | Michael Darlow |
| 1976 | Explorers: "Amundsen" | David Cobham |
| 1976 | Explorers: "Captain Cook" | John Irvin |
| 1976 | Omnibus: "Nijinsky, God of the Dance" | Colin Nears |
| 1976 | Explorers: "Pizarro" | Fred Burnley |
| 1977 | On the Move | David Hargreaves |
| 1977 | Aquarius | Derek Bailey |
| 1977 | Claude Monet | John Read |
| 1977 | One Man and His Dog | Philip S. Gilbert |
| 1977 | That's Life | Esther Rantzen |

Best Specialized Series

| Year | Title | Recipient(s) |
|---|---|---|
| 1973 | Ways of Seeing - John Berger | Michael Dibb |
| 1973 | Aquarius | Humphrey Burton and the Production Team |
| 1973 | Omnibus | Mike Wooller |
| 1974 | Vision On | Patrick Dowling |
| 1974 | Aquarius | Humphrey Burton |
| 1974 | The Ascent of Man | Adrian Malone |
| 1974 | Chronicle | Paul Johnstone |
| 1975 | Aquarius | Humphrey Burton |
| 1975 | Face the Music | Walter Todds |
| 1975 | Microbes and Men | Peter Goodchild |
| 1975 | Omnibus | Michael Wooller |
| 1976 | Explorers | Michael Latham |
| 1976 | The Fight Against Slavery | Christopher Ralling |
| 1976 | Mastermind | Bill Wright |
| 1976 | Omnibus | |

=== 1980s ===
Programme/Series Without Category

| Year | Title | Recipient(s) |
|---|---|---|
| 1980 | The South Bank Show | Melvyn Bragg |
| 1980 | It'll Be Alright on the Night II | Paul Smith |
| 1980 | Jacqueline du Pre Master Class | Rodney Greenberg |
| 1980 | Timothy West as Beecham | Robin Lough |
| 1981 | Omnibus | Leslie Megahey |
| 1981 | Arena | Alan Yentob |
| 1981 | Mastermind | Bill Wright |
| 1981 | The South Bank Show | |
| 1982 | Arena | Alan Yentob |
| 1982 | Film '81 | Judy Lindsay, Margaret Sharpe |
| 1982 | Clive James at the Movies | Nicholas Barrett |
| 1982 | The South Bank Show | Melvyn Bragg |
| 1983 | Arena | Alan Yentob |
| 1983 | Clive James on Television | Nicholas Barrett |
| 1983 | Did You See...? | John Archer |
| 1983 | The South Bank Show | Melvyn Bragg |
| 1984 | Arena | Alan Yentob |
| 1984 | Clive James on Television | Nicholas Barrett |
| 1984 | Did You See...? | Chris Mohr, John Archer |
| 1984 | The South Bank Show | Melvyn Bragg |
| 1985 | Did You See...? | John Archer |
| 1985 | Arena | Alan Yentob |
| 1985 | Clive James on Television | Nicholas Barrett |
| 1985 | The South Bank Show | Melvyn Bragg |

Huw Wheldon Award for Best Arts Programme

| Year | Title | Recipient(s) |
|---|---|---|
| 1987 | Arena: Scarfe On Scarfe | Gerald Scarfe |
| 1987 | Chasing a Rainbow: The Life of Josephine Baker | Christopher Ralling |
| 1987 | Dirk Bogarde - Above The Title | Nick Gray |
| 1987 | Omnibus: The Bolshoi Ballet | Michael Houldey |
| 1987 | Sondheim On Broadway - Follies: Four Days In New York | Michael Houldey |
| 1987 | The South Bank Show: Michael Powell | David Hinton |
| 1987 | The South Bank Show: The Andrew Lloyd Webber Story | Alan Benson |
| 1988 | LS Lowry: A Simple Man | Ian Squires, Gillian Lynne |
| 1988 | Arena: Dennis Potter | Anthony Wall |
| 1988 | The South Bank Show: Maria Callas | Tony Palmer |
| 1988 | Omnibus: George Gershwin Remembered | Peter Adam |
| 1989 | The South Bank Show: Bertolucci and the Last Emperor | David Hinton |
| 1989 | John Gielgud: An Actor's Life | Dave Heather, John Miller |
| 1989 | Omnibus: HRH The Prince Of Wales - A Vision Of Britain | Christopher Martin, Nicholas Rossiter |
| 1989 | The South Bank Show: The Art of Walt Disney | Alan Benson |

=== 1990s ===
Huw Wheldon Award for Best Arts Programme

| Year | Title | Recipient(s) |
|---|---|---|
| 1990 | Omnibus: "Art in the Third Reich" | Peter Adam |
| 1990 | The South Bank Show: "Barry Humphries" | Nigel Wattis |
| 1990 | The South Bank Show: "Dustin Hoffman" | Tony Knox |
| 1990 | Arena: "Tales From Barcelona" | Jana Boková |
| 1991 | The South Bank Show: "The Partnership Between Robert Bolt and Sir David Lean" | David Thomas |
| 1991 | Omnibus: "Bernstein" | Peter Maniura, Humphrey Burton |
| 1991 | The South Bank Show: "Alan Parker" | Frances Dickenson |
| 1991 | The South Bank Show: "Spitting Image" | Alan Benson |
| 1992 | Without Walls: "J'Accuse - Citizen Kane" | Gary Johnstone |
| 1992 | The South Bank Show: "Jose Carreras - A Life Story" | Chris Hunt |
| 1992 | The South Bank Show Special: "Kiri Te Kanawa" | Nigel Wattis |
| 1992 | The South Bank Show: "Terry Gilliam" | Frances Dickenson |
| 1993 | Omnibus: "Angela Carter's Curious Room" | Kim Evans |
| 1993 | Bookmark: Miss Pym's Day Out | James Runcie |
| 1993 | The Nicholas Brothers: We Sing And We Dance | Chris Bould, Chipps Chipperfield |
| 1993 | The South Bank Show: "The Making of Sergeant Pepper" | Alan Benson, Nick De Grunwald |
| 1994 | Bookmark: The Vampire's Life | Anand Tucker |
| 1994 | Omnibus: "Magic Lantern" | Dennis Marks |
| 1994 | The South Bank Show: "Sylvie Guillem" | Nigel Wattis |
| 1994 | Theremin: An Electric Odyssey | Steve Martin |
| 1995 | Without Walls: "An Interview with Dennis Potter" | Melvyn Bragg, David Thomas, Nigel Wattis |
| 1995 | Shakespeare on the Estate | Penny Woolcock |
| 1996 | Children of the Revolution | John Wyver, David Hinton |
| 1996 | Arena | Peter Lydon |
| 1996 | The Homecoming | Archie Baron |
| 1996 | A Personal Journey with Martin Scorsese Through American Movies | Florence Dauman |
| 1997 | Rhythm: Leaving Home | Sue Knussen, Hilary Chadwick |
| 1997 | A History of British Art | Gillian Greenwood |
| 1997 | American Visions | Nicholas Rossiter |
| 1997 | Dancing in the Street: A Rock and Roll History | Hugh Thomson |
| 1998 | The South Bank Show: "Gilbert and George" | Gerald Fox |
| 1998 | Bookmark: Not Waving but Drowning | Aysha Rafaele |
| 1998 | Dancing for Dollars | Angus Macqueen |
| 1998 | Omnibus: "Jack Rosenthal - Jack The Lad" | Anne Elletson, Randall Wright |
| 1999 | The Arena: "Brian Epstein Story" | Debbie Geller, Diana Mansfield, Anthony Wall |
| 1999 | The Secret Art of Government | Nick Rossiter |
| 1999 | The Arena: "Noel Coward Trilogy" | Adam Low |
| 1999 | Vile Bodies: "Naked" | Adam Barker, Edmund Coulthard |

=== 2000s ===
Huw Wheldon Award for Best Arts Programme

| Year | Title | Recipient(s) | Broadcaster |
|---|---|---|---|
| 2000 | This is Modern Art | Ian MacMillan, Matt Collings | Channel 4 |
| 2000 | The Abba Story | Chris Hunt, Steve Cole | ITV |
| 2000 | The Hip Hop Years | David Upshal, Stephen Lambert | Channel 4 |
| 2000 | Reputations: Hitchcock/Alfred The Great/Alfred The Auteur | Tim Kirby | BBC Two |

Huw Wheldon Award For Specialised Programme or Series

| Year | Title | Recipient(s) | Broadcaster |
|---|---|---|---|
| 2001 | Howard Goodall's Big Bangs | Paul Sommers, Howard Goodall, Jan Younghusband | Channel 4 |
| 2001 | Arena: "Wisconsin Death Trip" | Maureen Ryan, James Marsh, Anthony Wall | BBC Two |
| 2001 | A History Of Britain by Simon Schama | Martin Davidson, Simon Schama | BBC Two |
| 2001 | Elizabeth | Mark Fielder, Steven Clarke, David Starkey | Channel 4 |
| 2002 | Arena: "The Private Dirk Bogarde" | Anthony Wall, Adam Low | BBC Two |
| 2002 | The 1940s House | Alex Graham, Simon Shaw, Caroline Ross Pirie | Channel 4 |
| 2002 | The Six Wives of Henry VIII | | Channel 4 |
| 2002 | Walk On By: The Story of Popular Song | Michael Poole, Alan Lewens | BBC Two |
| 2003 | The Trust | | Channel 4 |
| 2003 | A History Of Britain by Simon Schama | | BBC Two |
| 2003 | Life of Mammals | | BBC One |
| 2003 | Revealed | | Five |
| 2004 | The National Trust | Claire Kavanagh, Nick Kent, Patrick Forbes | BBC Four |
| 2004 | Leonardo | Michael Mosley, Lesley Megahey, Alan Yentob | BBC One |
| 2004 | Operatunity | Roy Ackerman, Michael Waldman | Channel 4 |
| 2004 | Seven Wonders of the Industrial World | | BBC Two |

Best Specialist Factual

| Year | Title | Recipient(s) | Broadcaster |
|---|---|---|---|
| 2005 | Dunkirk | Rob Warr, Alex Holmes | BBC Two |
| 2005 | D-Day | Richard Dale, Tim Bradley | BBC One |
| 2005 | D-Day: The Ultimate Conflict | Mark Lewis, Ana Paula Lloyd, Simon Greenwood | Five |
| 2005 | Howard Goodall's 20th Century Greats | Paul Sommers, David Jeffcock, Francis Hanly | Channel 4 |
| 2006 | Holocaust - A Music Memorial Film From Auschwitz | | BBC Two |
| 2006 | The Boy with The Incredible Brain | Martin Weitz, Toby Trackman, Steve Gooder | Five |
| 2006 | Arena: "No Direction Home - Bob Dylan" | Nigel Sinclair, Anthony Wall, Martin Scorsese | BBC Two |
| 2006 | Life in the Undergrowth | | BBC One |
| 2007 | Nuremberg: Goering's Last Stand | Peter Nicholson, Simon Berthon, Dan Korn, Piers Vellacott | Channel 4 |
| 2007 | Munich: Mossad's Revenge | Anthony Geffen, Tom Whitter, Peter Miller, Calum Walker | Channel 4 |
| 2007 | Planet Earth | Alastair Fothergill, Mark Linfield | BBC One |
| 2007 | Simon Schama's Power of Art | Clare Beavan, Simon Schama, Basil Comely, Mark Harrison | BBC Two |
| 2008 | Andrew Marr's History of Modern Britain | Andrew Marr, Chris Granlund, Tom Giles, Clive Edwards | BBC Two |
| 2008 | The Genius of Photography | Tim Kirby, Alex Graham, Michael Jackson | BBC Four |
| 2008 | Earth: The Power of the Planet | Dr Iain Stewart, Jonathan Renouf, Phil Dolling | BBC Two |
| 2008 | The Relief of Belsen | Justin Hardy, Susan Horth, Peter Guinness, Lucy Bassnet-McGuire | Channel 4 |
| 2009 | Life in Cold Blood | | BBC One |
| 2009 | Lost Land of the Jaguar | | BBC One |
| 2009 | Blood and Guts: A History of Surgery | Claudia Lewis, Kim Shillinglaw | BBC Four |
| 2009 | Stephen Fry and the Gutenberg Press: The Machine That Made Us | Stephen Fry, Patrick McGrady, Lucy Ward, Philip Crocker | BBC Four |

=== 2010s ===
| Year | Title | Recipient(s) | Broadcaster |
|---|---|---|---|
| 2010 | Inside Nature's Giants | David Dugan, Julian Thomas, Alex Tate, Yvonne Bainton | Channel 4 |
| 2010 | Art of Russia | Andrew Graham-Dixon, John Hay, Silvia Sacco, Karen McGann | BBC Four |
| 2010 | Chemistry: A Volatile History | Jim Al-Khalili, Helen Thomas, Sacha Baveystock, Kim Shillinglaw | BBC Four |
| 2010 | Yellowstone | | BBC Two |
| 2011 | Flying Monsters 3D | David Attenborough, Anthony Geffen, Sias Wilson | Sky 3D |
| 2011 | The Making of Alan Bennett and The Habit of Art | Martin Rosenbaum, David Sabel, Toby Coffey, Adam Low | More4 |
| 2011 | Human Planet | Brian Leith, Dale Templar, Nitin Sawhney, Tom Hugh-Jones | BBC One |
| 2011 | Pompeii: Life and Death in a Roman Town | Paul Elston, Daisy Scalchi, Richard Bradley | BBC Two |
| 2012 | Mummifying Alan: Egypt's Last Secret | Laura Jones, Justine Kershaw, Gillian Moseley, Kenny Scott | Channel 4 |
| 2012 | British Masters | Jonty Claypole, James Fox, Matt Hill, Richard Wilkinson | BBC Four |
| 2012 | Frozen Planet | David Attenborough, Vanessa Berlowitz, Alastair Fothergill, Mark Linfield | BBC One |
| 2012 | Wonders of the Universe | Brian Cox, Michael Lachman, Jonathan Renouf, James Van Der Pool | BBC Two |
| 2013 | All in the Best Possible Taste with Grayson Perry | Grayson Perry, Joe Evans, Neil Crombie, Dinah Lord | Channel 4 |
| 2013 | The Secret History of Our Streets | | BBC Two |
| 2013 | The Plane Crash | Simon Dickson, Sanjay Singhal, Steve Nam, Geoff Deehan | Channel 4 |
| 2013 | The Plot to Bring Down Britain’s Planes | | Channel 4 |
| 2014 | David Attenborough's Natural History Museum Alive | David Attenborough, Anthony Geffen, Mike Davis, Dan Smith | Sky 3D |
| 2014 | Richard III: The King in the Car Park | Simon Young, Julian Ware, Louise Osmond | Channel 4 |
| 2014 | Martin Luther King and The March on Washington | John Akomfrah, Lina Gopaul, David Lawson | Channel 4 |
| 2014 | Story of the Jews | | BBC Two |
| 2015 | Grayson Perry: Who Are You? | Neil Crombie, Joe Evans, Grayson Perry, Dinah Lord | Channel 4 |
| 2015 | David Attenborough's Conquest of the Skies 3D | Anthony Geffen, David Lee, David Attenborough | Sky 3D |
| 2015 | The Great War: The People’s Story | | ITV |
| 2015 | Our Gay Wedding: The Musical | Sean Murphy, Archie Baron, Nathan Taylor, Benjamin Till | Channel 4 |
| 2016 | Britain's Forgotten Slave Owners | | BBC Two |
| 2016 | Grayson Perry’s Dream House | Neil Crombie, Grayson Perry, Joe Evans, Marcus Plowright | Channel 4 |
| 2016 | The Hunt | | BBC One |
| 2016 | Rudolf Nureyev – Dance to Freedom | Franny Moyle, Richard Curson Smith, Tom Herington, Yelena Durden-Smith | BBC Two |
| 2017 | Planet Earth II | Michael Gunton, Tom Hugh-Jones, Elizabeth White, David Attenborough | BBC One |
| 2017 | Alan Bennett's Diaries | Adam Low, Martin Rosenbaum, David Sabel | BBC Two |
| 2017 | Attenborough's Life That Glows | Martin Dohrn, Joe Loncraine, Paul Reddish, Fraser Purdie | BBC Two |
| 2017 | Grayson Perry: All Man | Grayson Perry, Neil Crombie, Joe Evans, Arthur Cary | Channel 4 |
| 2018 | Basquiat: Rage to Riches | David Shulman, Janet Lee | BBC Two |
| 2018 | Blue Planet II | | BBC One |
| 2018 | Blitz: The Bombs that Changed Britain | Tim Kirby, Emily Thompson, Francesca Maudslay, Cate Hall | BBC Two |
| 2018 | Elizabeth I's Secret Agents | Chris Durlacher, Bernadette Ross, Julian Jones, Claire Guillon | BBC Two |
| 2019 | Suffragettes with Lucy Worsley | | BBC One |
| 2019 | Bros: After the Screaming Stops | David Soutar, Joe Pearlman, Leo Pearlman, Heather Greenwood | BBC Four |
| 2019 | Grayson Perry: Rites of Passage | Grayson Perry, Neil Crombie, Joe Evans, James House | Channel 4 |
| 2019 | Superkids: Breaking Away from Care | | Channel 4 |

=== 2020s ===
| Year | Title | Recipient(s) | Broadcaster |
|---|---|---|---|
| 2020 | Yorkshire Ripper Files: A Very British Crime Story | Liza Williams, Jasmine Macnabb, Nancy Bornat, Leanne Klein | BBC Four |
| 2020 | 8 Days: To The Moon and Back | | BBC Two |
| 2020 | Thatcher: A Very British Revolution | | BBC Two |
| 2020 | Seven Worlds, One Planet | | BBC One |
| 2021 | The Surgeon’s Cut | James Newton, James Van Der Pool, Andrew Cohen | Netflix |
| 2021 | Extinction: The Facts | Serena Davies, Helen Thomas, Stephen Moore, Charlotte Lathane | BBC One |
| 2021 | The Rise of the Murdoch Dynasty | David Glover, Cate Hall, Jamie Roberts, Owen Phillips, Justin Badger, Sam Santana | BBC Two |
| 2021 | Putin: A Russian Spy Story | James Rogan, Nick Green, Paul Mitchell, Adam Finch | Channel 4 |
| 2022 | The Missing Children | Tanya Stephan, Rachel Cumella, Brian Woods, Anne Morrison, Paddy Garrick, Ella Newton | ITV |
| 2022 | Black Power: A British Story of Resistance | George Amponsah, Helen Bart, Steve McQueen, James Rogan, Soleta Rogan, Tracey Scoffield | BBC Two |
| 2022 | Silenced: The Hidden Story of Disabled Britain | | BBC Two |
| 2022 | The Freddie Mercury: The Final Act | James Rogan, Daniel Hall, Chris Wilson, Mark Hedgecoe, Soleta Rogan, Simon Lupton | BBC Two |
| 2023 | Russia 1985–1999: TraumaZone | Adam Curtis, Sandra Gorel, Rose Garnett, Grigor Atanesian | BBC iPlayer |
| 2023 | The Green Planet | Michael Gunton, Rupert Barrington, Paul Williams, Peter Bassett, Rosie Thomas, Elisabeth Oakham | BBC One |
| 2023 | How to Survive a Dictator with Munya Chawawa | | Channel 4 |
| 2024 | White Nanny, Black Child | Andy Mundy-Castle, Natasha Dack Ojumu, Rochelle Newman, Zeb Achonu, Ross Leppard, Rachael McLean-Anderson | Channel 5 |
| 2024 | Chimp Empire | James Reed, Matt Houghton, Callum Webster, Matt Cole | Netflix |
| 2024 | The Enfield Poltergeist | Jerry Rothwell, Al Morrow, Stewart le Maréchal, Nicole Stott, Jonathan Silberberg, Davis Guggenheim | Apple TV+ |
| 2024 | Forced Out | Luke Korzun Martin, Sophie Perrins, Chibuikem Oforka, Josh Green, Tom Pullen, Richard Bond | Sky Documentaries |
| 2025 | Atomic People | Benedict Sanderson, Megumi Inman, Morgan Matthews, Otto Burnham | BBC Two |
| 2025 | Billy & Molly: An Otter Love Story | | National Geographic |
| 2025 | Children of the Cult | Maroesja Perizonius, Alice McShane, Victoria Hollingsworth, David Modell, Ella Newton, Ben Ferguson | ITV1 |
| 2025 | Miners' Strike 1984: The Battle for Britain | Tom Barrow, Christian Collerton, Zora Kuettner, Neil Crombie, Joe Evans, Miriam Walsh | Channel 4 |
| 2026 | Simon Schama: The Road to Auschwitz | Simon Schama, Hugo Macgregor, Jyoti Mehta, Richard Wilkinson, Nicolas Kent, Venita Singh-Warner | BBC Two |
| 2026 | What They Found | Sam Mendes, Simon Chinn, Gaby Aung, David Baddiel, Pippa Harris, Andy Worboys | BBC Two |
| 2026 | Surviving Black Hawk Down | Jack MacInnes, Dominic Crossley-Holland, Jamal Osman, Tom Pearson, Sam Hobkinson, Clare Keeley | Netflix |
| 2026 | Vietnam: The War That Changed America | Mark Raphael, David Glover, Rob Coldstream, Caroline Marsden, Mike Davey, Sam Bergson | Apple TV |

- Note: The series that don't have recipients on the tables had Production team credited as recipients for the award or nomination.
