= British Academy Television Craft Award for Best Photography: Factual =

Award for technical achievements in TV

British Academy Television Craft Award
- Country: United Kingdom
- Presented by: British Academy of Film and Television Arts
- First award: 1992
- Currently held by: State of Rage – Marcel Mettelsiefen (2025)
- Website: http://www.bafta.org/

The British Academy Television Craft Award for Best Photography: Factual is one of the categories presented by the British Academy of Film and Television Arts (BAFTA) within the British Academy Television Craft Awards, the craft awards were established in 2000 with their own, separate ceremony as a way to spotlight technical achievements, without being overshadowed by the main production categories. According to the BAFTA website, for this category the "eligibility is limited to the director of photography."

Several categories were presented to recognize photography and lighting in television programming:

- From 1978 to 1991 Best Film Cameramen was presented.
- From 1978 to 1982 Best Television Cameramen was presented.
- In 1978 Best Special Lighting Effects was presented.
- From 1978 to 1980 Best Television Lighting was presented.
- From 1981 to 1994 Best Video Lighting was presented.

In 1992, those categories transformed in two, Best Film or Video Photography - Factual and Best Film or Video Photography - Fiction/Entertainment until 1994 when they would be renamed for the last time, resulting in Best Photography: Factual and Best Photography & Lighting: Fiction respectively.

== Winners and nominees ==
=== 1990s ===
Best Film or Video Photography - Factual

Year	Title	Recipient(s)
1992	Cutting Edge: Casualties	Diane Tammes
1992	ITN Coverage of The Gulf Oil Fires	John Boyce
1992	ITN Coverage of The Cruise Missile Attack on Baghdad	Phil Bye
1992	ITN Coverage of The Gulf War	Nigel Thomson
1993	Pole to Pole	Nigel Meakin
1993	Elizabeth R	Philip Bonham Carter
1993	Survival: A Brush with Nature (Special)	Dieter Plage
1993	Song of the Night	Colin Waldeck
1994	Life in the Freezer	
1994	Children’s Hospital	Martin Lightening
1994	True Stories: The Unforgiving	Jacek Petrycki
1994	ITN Coverage of The Storming of the Moscow White House and The Civil War in Georgia	Jon Steele, Eugene Campbell

Best Photography: Factual

Year	Title	Recipient(s)
1995	Beyond the Clouds	Phil Agland
1995	The Nick	Paul Berriff
1995	In the Wild: Dolphins with Robin Williams	
1995	From A to B: Tales of Modern Motoring	Chris Hartley, Dave Bennett, Rob Pascall
1996	True Stories: The Betrayed	Jacek Petrycki
1996	Wildlife: Great White Shark - The True Story of Jaws (Special)	Paul Atkins, Peter, Scoones, Doug Allen
1996	Secret Asia: The Dying Rooms	Peter Hugh, Brian Woods
1996	The Homecoming	Jacek Petrycki
1997	True Stories: Crime of the Wolf	Sergei Astakhov, Alexander Ustinov
1997	Great Ormond Street	
1997	The House	Chris Cox, Paul Otter
1997	American Visions	Allan Palmer
1998	Wildlife: Polar Bear (Special)	Doug Allan, Martin Saunders
1998	Full Circle with Michael Palin	Nigel Meakin
1998	True Stories: The Grave	Richard Ranken
1998	Wildlife: Eagle (Special)	Michael W Richards
1999	42 Up	George Jesse Turner
1999	Arena: The Brian Epstein Story	Luke Cardiff
1999	Born To Be Wild: Operation Lemur with John Cleese	Mike Eley, Warwick Sloss, Gavin Thurston
1999	The Human Body	Chris Hartley, David Barlow, Tim Shepherd, Rob Franklin

=== 2000s ===
Year	Title	Episode	Recipient(s)	Broadcaster
2000	Wildlife	"Tiger (Special)"	Chip Houseman, Hugh Miles	BBC One
2000	Shanghai Vice		Phil Agland	Channel 4
2000	Lost on Everest: The Search for Mallory and Irvine		Ned Johnston	PBS
2000	Michael Palin's Hemingway Adventure		Nigel Meakin	BBC One
2001	Arena	"Wisconsin Death Trip"	Eigil Bryld	BBC Two
2001	Endurance: Shackleton and the Antarctic		Tom Hurwitz, Scott Ransom, Sandi Sissel	Channel 4
2001	Australia: Beyond the Fatal Shore		David Baillie, Jeremy Pollard, Sion Michel	BBC Two
2001	Andes to Amazon			BBC Two
2002	The Blue Planet			BBC One
2002	Fire, Plague, War and Treason	"The Great Plague"	Simon Bray	Channel 4
2002	Wild Africa			BBC Two
2002	Wildlife	"Grizzly - Face to Face (Special)"	Jeff Turner	BBC One
2003	Sahara with Michael Palin		Nigel Meakin	BBC One
2003	Edwardian Country House		Chris Hartley	Channel 4
2003	The Life of Mammals			BBC One
2003	The Natural World	"In Search of Killer Ants"	Martin Dohrn	BBC Two
2004	Ancient Egyptians	"The Battle of Meggido"	Peter Greenhalgh	Channel 4
2004	George Orwell: A Life in Pictures		Jeff Baynes	BBC Two
2004	Seven Wonders of the Industrial World	"The Hoover Dam"	Mike Spragg	BBC Two
2004	Colosseum		Peter Greenhalgh	BBC One
2005	Venice	"Death"	Fred Fabre	BBC Two
2005	British Isles – A Natural History			BBC One
2005	Himalaya with Michael Palin		Nigel Meakin, Peter Meakin	BBC One
2005	Bears: Spy in the Woods		Michael W Richards, Geoffrey Bell	BBC One
2006	Tsunami: 7 Hours on Boxing Day		Paul Otter	BBC One
2006	A Picture of Britain		Fred Fabre	BBC One
2006	Real Families	"My Skin Could Kill Me"	Chris Holland	ITV
2006	Michael Palin and The Mystery of Hammershoi		Neville Kidd	BBC Four
2007	Simon Schama's Power of Art		Tim Cragg	BBC Two
2007	Breaking Up with The Joneses		Ursula MacFarlane, Saskia Wilson	Channel 4
2007	Galapagos			BBC Two
2007	Planet Earth			BBC One
2008	Tribe	"Nenets"	Wayne Derrick	BBC Two
2008	The Natural World	"Wye – Voices from The Valley"	Charlie Hamilton-James, James McPherson	BBC Two
2008	Dispatches	"China’s Stolen Children (Special)"	Jezza Neumann	Channel 4
2008	The Seven Sins of England		Mark Wolf	Channel 4
2009	A History of Scotland		Neville Kidd	BBC One
2009	The Victorian Sex Explorer		Roger Chapman	Channel 4
2009	Amazon with Bruce Parry		Matt Norman	BBC Two
2009	Ross Kemp in Afghanistan		Andrew Thompson	Sky One

=== 2010s ===
Year	Title	Episode	Recipient(s)	Broadcaster
2010	Yellowstone	"Winter"	Camera Team	BBC Two
2010	Dispatches	"The Slumdog Children of Mumbai"	Nick Read	Channel 4
2010	How Earth Made Us			BBC Two
2010	Andrew Marr's The Making of Modern Britain		Neil Harvey	BBC Two
2010	Life	"Insects"	Rod Clarke, Kevin Flay	BBC One
2011	Human Planet	"Arctic – Life in the Deep Freeze"	Will Edwards, Doug Allan, Matt Norman	BBC One
2011	David Attenborough's First Life		Pete Hayns, Paul Williams	BBC Two
2011	Human Planet	"Oceans – Into the Blue"	Simon Enderby, Robin Cox, Richard Wollocombe	BBC One
2011	Human Planet	"Jungles – People of the Trees"	Gavin Thurston, Robin Cox, Pete Hayns	BBC One
2012	Frozen Planet	"To the Ends of the Earth"	Camera Team	BBC One
2012	Crack House		Sean Bobbitt	BBC One
2012	Earthflight	"Europe"	Richard Cook, Christian Moullec, Michael W Richards	BBC One
2012	True Stories	"Gypsy Blood"	Leo Maguire	Channel 4
2013	Amish: A Secret Life		Steve Robinson	BBC Two
2013	Kingdom of Plants 3D		Tim Cragg, Robert Hollingworth, Tim Shepherd	Sky 3D
2013	Return to the Falklands		Rupert Binsley	BBC One
2013	Supersized Earth		Julius Brighton, Paul O'Callaghan	BBC One
2014	Rebuilding the World Trade Center		Marcus Robinson	Channel 4
2014	Africa	"Congo"	Camera Team	BBC One
2014	Dispatches	"Syria: Across the Lines"	Olly Lambert	Channel 4
2014	Mechanical Marvels: Clockwork Dreams		Andy Jackson	BBC Four
2015	Dispatches	"Children on the Frontline"	Marcel Mettelsiefen	Channel 4
2015	Life and Death Row	"Execution"	Ben Anthony, Luke Menges	BBC Three
2015	Life Story	"First Steps"	Camera Team	BBC One
2015	Photographing Africa		Richard Jones, Max Hug Williams, Harry Hook	BBC Four
2016	The Hunt			BBC One
2016	Handmade	"Metal"	Andrew Muggleton	BBC Four
2016	Dispatches	"The Children Who Beat Ebola"	Ben Steele	Channel 4
2016	Big Cats: An Amazing Animal Family		Pete Hayns, Mark Payne-Gill, Luke Barnett	Sky One
2017	Planet Earth II	"Cities"	John Aitchison, Rob Whitworth, Mark MacEwen	BBC One
2017	Planet Earth II	"Deserts"	John Shier, Jonathan Jones, Barrie Britton	BBC One
2017	Planet Earth II	"Mountains"	John Shier, Mateo Willis, Barrie Britton	BBC One
2017	Planet Earth II	"Jungles"	Tom Crowley, Mark MacEwen, John Brown	BBC One
2018	Blue Planet II	"One Ocean"	Camera Team	BBC One
2018	Dispatches	"The Fight for Mosul"	Olivier Sarbil	Channel 4
2018	The Detectives	"Murder on the Streets"	Daniel Vernon, Daniel Dewsbury	BBC Two
2018	Storyville	"Last Men in Aleppo"	Fadi Al-Halabi, Hassan Kattan, Thaer Mohammed	BBC One
2019	Dynasties	"Emperor"	Lindsay McCrae	BBC One
2019	Michael Palin in North Korea		Jaimie Gramston	Channel 5
2019	Earth's Natural Wonders	"Surviving Against the Odds"	Camera Team	BBC One
2019	The Mighty Redcar		Daniel Dewsbury, Stuart Bernard, Jonny Ashton	BBC Two

=== 2020s ===
Year	Title	Episode	Recipient(s)	Broadcaster
2020	Seven Worlds, One Planet		Bertie Gregory, Howard Bourne, John Shier	BBC One
2020	Our Planet	"Coastal Seas"	Doug Anderson, Roger Horrocks, Gavin Thurston	Netflix
2020	Our Planet	"Frozen Worlds"	Jamie McPherson, Hector Skevington-Postles, Barrie Britton	Netflix
2020	Untouchable: The Rise and Fall of Harvey Weinstein		Patrick Smith, Neil Harvey	BBC Two
2021	The Great Mountain Sheep Gather		Johnny Shipley, Drone Camera Team, John Livesey	BBC Four
2021	Tiny World		Richard Kirby, Sue Gibson, Max Kölbl, Robert Hollingworth	Apple TV+
2021	Fear City: New York vs the Mafia		Tim Cragg	Netflix
2021	Marina Abramović Takes Over TV		Will Edwards and Michael O'Halloran	Sky Arts
2022	Liverpool Narcos		James Incledon	Sky Documentaries
2022	Tiny World	"Reef"	Doug Anderson, Alex Vail	Apple TV+
2022	Earth At Night In Color		John Shier, Dawson Dunning	Apple TV+
2022	My Childhood, My Country - 20 Years in Afghanistan		Phil Grabsky, Shoaib Sharifi	ITV
2023	Children of the Taliban		Marcel Mettelsiefen, Jordan Byron	Channel 4
2023	Hold Your Breath: The Ice Dive		Steve Jamison	Netflix
2023	Predators		Sue Gibson, Robin Cox, Florian Schulz, Will Nicholls	Sky Nature
2023	The Green Planet	"Tropical Worlds"	Tim Shepherd, Oliver Mueller, Todd Kewley, Jessica Mitchell, Sam Lewis	BBC One
2024	The Detectives: Taking Down an OCG		Benedict Sanderson	BBC Two
2024	Animals Up Close with Bertie Gregory		Bertie Gregory, Tom Walker, Anna Dimitriadis	Disney+
2024	The Man Who Played with Fire		Jean-Louis Schuller	Sky Documentaries
2024	Dublin Narcos		Narayan Van Maele, Patrick Smith	Sky Documentaries
2025	State of Rage		Marcel Mettelsiefen	Channel 4
2025	Storyville	"Life and Death in Gaza"	Camera Team	BBC Two
2025	Silverback		Miles Blayden-Ryall, Vianet Djenguet, Sam Dawe	BBC Two
2025	Billy & Molly: An Otter Love Story		Charlie Hamilton James, Johnny Rolt, Bertie Gregory	National Geographic
2026	Exposure	"Our Land: Israel's Other War"	Jordan Byron	ITV1
2026	Secrets of the Penguins		Camera Team	Disney+
2026	Exposure	"State of War: Fighting the Narcos"	Marcel Mettelsiefen	ITV1
2026	Surviving Black Hawk Down		Stefano Ferrari, Tim Cragg	Netflix

- Note: The series that don't have recipients on the tables had Camera Team credited as recipients for the award or nomination.

== See also ==
- Primetime Emmy Award for Outstanding Cinematography for a Nonfiction Program
