= Joel Douek =

- Born: London, England
- Occupation: Music composer

Joel Douek is an English film and television composer. His documentary works include Galapagos 3D about life on the Galápagos Islands, The Wildest Dream about Mount Everest, and Flying Monsters 3D about the pterosaurs. In addition to documentaries, he has also provided the music to the English adaptations of anime such as Yu-Gi-Oh! The Movie, cartoons such as Teenage Mutant Ninja Turtles as well as live-action films such as The Tall Man and the BBC series First Life with Sir David Attenborough. In 2010, he received a nomination for Best Original Score for a Documentary Feature at the International Film Music Critics Association (IFMCA) for his work on The Wildest Dream.

== Works ==
=== Film and television ===
Year	Series	Role	Notes	Source
2010	The Wildest Dream		Nominated–Best Original Score for a Documentary Feature, IFMCA	
2010	Flying Monsters 3D			
2011	The Bachelor King 3D		Trailer	
2012	Kingdom of Plants 3D			
2012	The Tall Man			
2013	Galapagos 3D			
2013	Across All Borders	Original Score	short film	

=== Anime and cartoons ===
Year	Series	Role (Note: Compositions for anime shows are for the English production)	Notes	Source
2004	Yu-Gi-Oh! The Movie: Pyramid of Light	Music		
	Shaman King	Original Music		
	Teenage Mutant Ninja Turtles		Fox TV	
	Ultimate Muscle		Fox TV	
	Incredible Crash Test Dummies		Fox TV	
