= Galapagos 3D =

British nature documentary series

- Series title card from Sky1 broadcast
- Genre: Nature documentary
- Written by: David Attenborough
- Directed by: Martin Williams
- Presented by: David Attenborough
- Country of origin: United Kingdom
- Original language: English
- No. of seasons: 1
- No. of episodes: 3

Production
- Executive producer: Anthony Geffen
- Producer: Sias Wilson
- Production location: Galápagos Islands
- Cinematography: Paul Williams, Simon de Glanville, Robert Hollingworth, Michael Pitts
- Running time: 60 minutes

Original release
- Network: Sky 3D, Sky1
- Release: 1 January – 12 January 2013

Related
- Kingdom of Plants 3D; Micro Monsters 3D

Galapagos 3D, also known as Galapagos with David Attenborough and David Attenborough's Galapagos, is a British nature documentary series written and presented by David Attenborough, directed by Martin Williams and filmed in 3D. Attenborough returns to the Galápagos Islands for the fourth time in his career and travels throughout the archipelago to explain their origins and their unique fauna in evolutionary terms.

The series premiered on 1 January 2013 on the Sky 3D network in the UK. A 2D version retitled Galapagos with David Attenborough was simulcast on Sky One, attracting 563,000 viewers. The making of the series was documented in the accompanying programme Making Attenborough's Galapagos.

Galapagos 3D is Attenborough's second 3D television series following 2012's Kingdom of Plants, and his fourth 3D project for Sky television after the earlier one-off documentaries Flying Monsters 3D and The Bachelor King 3D. In common with its predecessors, Galapagos 3D was produced by Colossus Productions, a partnership between Atlantic Productions and Sky.

The series is notable for its pioneering use of 3D cameras for underwater filming. It also features the first known footage of the Galápagos pink land iguana, a new species of lizard identified in 2009, and Attenborough's encounter with Lonesome George, the last Pinta Island tortoise, filmed a fortnight before the animal's death.

In 2013 Attenborough narrated Sky 3D's next natural history series on invertebrates, Micro Monsters 3D.

== Episodes ==
"In a lifetime spent making natural history films, I've been to many wonderful places, but none more extraordinary than here, the Galapagos Islands. These have been called nature's greatest experiment, for here life has evolved in isolation, and produced some extraordinary results."

— David Attenborough's opening narration

No.	Title	Original release date	UK viewers (millions)
1	"Origin"	1 January 2013	0.91
The series begins on Isabela Island, where Attenborough observes a group of Galápagos tortoises wallowing in a mud pool near Volcán Alcedo. In this programme he addresses two questions; how the islands were formed and how they came to be populated with an unusual assortment of creatures. The first islands emerged 4 million years ago, formed as volcanoes rising from the ocean floor. A CGI sequence shows a 3D visualisation of the hotspot which lies beneath the Galápagos. Their isolation made colonisation by terrestrial mammals and amphibians almost impossible, but plants, invertebrates, birds and reptiles succeeded in establishing themselves. Plant seeds, spiderlings and other minibeasts were blown here on equatorial trade winds. Attenborough demonstrates how other invertebrates arrived by opening a piece of driftwood to reveal a carpenter bee larva. The islands lie at the confluence of three deep ocean currents which carry nutrients from across the Pacific and up into surface waters. These nutrients support a diverse food chain, from phytoplankton to scalloped hammerheads and humpback whales. The marine life in turn supports populations of sea lions, sea birds and Galápagos penguins. The physiology of reptiles enabled some individuals to survive the long crossing from South America on floating rafts of vegetation washed down rivers and out to sea. Thus, the island’s "cast of characters", as Attenborough describes them, was assembled.
2	"Adaptation"	5 January 2013	0.48
The second programme considers how Galápagos's plants and animals managed to adapt to the harsh conditions they encountered. A CGI sequence demonstrates the life cycle of a typical Galápagos island. Born through volcanic activity, it rises from the ocean eventually reaching mountainous heights before sinking under its own weight and then finally eroding back into the sea. There are islands today which represent all stages of this history. The youngest, Fernandina, has a barren, volcanic interior. Marine iguanas have successfully colonised its shoreline by adapting to feed on seaweed and expel salt from a special gland. Santa Cruz is a middle-aged mountainous island, able to create its own rainfall and thus enabling plants to thrive. Attenborough demonstrates the forests of giant Scalesia, a relative of the dandelion, which flourish on its highland slopes. Scientists exploring lava tunnels just below the surface are still discovering new species. Older islands such as Española are smaller, drier and flatter. Its sandy beaches are used by Galápagos sea lions and waved albatross. Tortuga and Devil's Crown are the eroded remnants of volcanic cones, close to disappearing into the sea. Their surrounding waters support coral reefs, fertilised by the erosion of sediments from the land. Submerged islands further to the east can still influence life. Whale sharks are thought to use them for navigation, but the reason why they pass through Galápagos waters is still unclear.
3	"Evolution"	12 January 2013	0.81
In the final episode, Attenborough explains why the islands have a greater number of species for their size than anywhere else on Earth. One factor is their isolation, which can even occur between different parts of an island. Volcán Wolf is cut off from the rest of Isabela Island by a barren lava flow. Aerial footage of giant tortoises which try to cross it show how they are baked alive by the tropical sun. Secondly, the deep geological forces which produced the islands are still at work. Volcanic activity, continental drift and erosion give each island its own character and each its own evolutionary community. An absence of large predators is a third factor. Galápagos hawks and Galápagos racers prey on young, weak or dying iguanas but this does not have much effect on the overall population. The inhabitants can reproduce freely and rapidly, thus accelerating evolutionary change. Attenborough uses the examples of Galápagos finches and lava lizards to show how variations in anatomy and behaviour on different islands can lead to speciation. He goes on to explain that scientists are now revealing how human beings are acting as an agent of evolutionary change. In the closing sequences, Attenborough is filmed with Lonesome George, the last surviving Pinta Island tortoise, and the pink iguana, a newly-discovered species found only on the slopes of Volcano Wolf.
4	"The Making Of David Attenborough's Galapagos"	0	
