= Adventures of the Penguin King =

- Directed by: Anthony Geffen; Sias Wilson
- Produced by: Sias Wilson
- Narrated by: Tim Allen
- Cinematography: Simon Niblett
- Edited by: Robert Hall
- Music by: James Edward Barker
- Production companies: Atlantic Productions; Sky 3D; Galileo Digital Entertainment; Serengeti Entertainment
- Distributed by: Cinedigm
- Release date: December 6, 2013 (US)
- Running time: 77 minutes
- Country: United Kingdom
- Language: English

Adventures of the Penguin King is a British 2013 natural history documentary which follows the life of a male king penguin on South Georgia. Released in 3D and 2D, the film uses some of the same footage as Penguins 3D.

It was released as on Blu-ray and Blu-ray 3D by Cinedigm in 2014.
