= The Penguin King =

- British poster
- Directed by: Anthony Geffen; Sias Wilson
- Written by: Sias Wilson; David Attenborough
- Produced by: Anthony Geffen; Sias Wilson
- Narrated by: David Attenborough (UK); Tim Allen (USA)
- Edited by: Robert Hall
- Music by: James Edward Barker
- Production companies: Atlantic Productions; Sky 3D; Galileo Digital Entertainment; Serengeti Entertainment
- Distributed by: nWave Pictures Distribution
- Release date: October 24, 2012 (UK)
- Country: United Kingdom
- Language: English

The Penguin King (American title: Penguins 3D) is a British 2012 natural history documentary which follows the life of a male king penguin on South Georgia. Released in 3D and 2D, The Penguin King is the second collaboration between Sky, Atlantic Productions and David Attenborough, who wrote and narrated the film. It was preceded by Flying Monsters 3D, screened a year earlier, and was followed by the three-part series Kingdom of Plants 3D in spring 2012. The film features a music score from British composer James Edward Barker.

A new version of the film, Adventures of the Penguin King, was released in December 2013.

"The Making of the Penguin King with David Attenborough", a 49-min making of featurette was also released on TV.
