= David Attenborough's Conquest of the Skies 3D =

2015 British natural history television series

- Genre: Nature documentary
- Written by: David Attenborough
- Directed by: David Lee
- Presented by: David Attenborough
- Country of origin: United Kingdom
- No. of series: 1
- No. of episodes: 3

Production
- Executive producer: Siobhan Mulholland
- Producer: Anthony Geffen
- Cinematography: Paul Williams; Robert Hollingworth; Simon de Glanville
- Editor: Peter Miller
- Running time: 60 minutes
- Production companies: Colossus Productions; Atlantic Productions; Sky Television

Original release
- Network: Sky 1 HD; Sky 3D
- Release: 1 January – 15 January 2015

David Attenborough's Conquest of the Skies 3D is a British natural history television series tracking the evolution of flight in animals. David Attenborough analyses gliding reptiles, parachuting mammals, acrobatic insects and the world of birds.

== Production ==
The series was shot on location in China, Segovia, Rome, Scotland, Ecuador and Borneo. Some scenes were filmed at the Gomantong Caves in Malaysia. For a scene involving whooper swans, the show enlisted Rose Buck, whom the swans viewed as a mother figure. Buck who used to be a nurse for children, coaxed the swans to move in her direction.

== Broadcast ==
David Attenborough's Conquest of the Skies 3D television broadcast began on 1 January 2015 on Sky 3D and Sky 1 HD. The UK broadcast consisted of three episodes, with a single making-of documentary called simply The Making of David Attenborough's Conquest of the Skies to be broadcast after the last general episode on 15 January 2015.

== Episodes ==
No.	Title	Original release date	UK viewers (millions)
1	"The First To Fly"	1 January 2015	N/A
The episode starts with Attenborough talking about dragonflies and how the first flyers evolved. Then he goes to the jungles of Borneo where he witnesses how stag beetles take to the air. Finally, he travels to London where some bluebottle flies feast on his dinner. He explains how the everyday fly can turn and twist in a dazzling show of aerodynamics. The episode ends with Attenborough hyping up the suspense for the second episode.
2	"Rivals"	8 January 2015	N/A
The episode begins with David Attenborough explaining how insects had the skies to themselves for millions of years—when a pterosaur suddenly arrives on the scene and eats a dragonfly. David Attenborough tells the viewers that the pterosaur's name is Dimorphodon. He travels back in time and watches the pterosaurs evolve into truly humongous behemoths like the late Quetzalcoatlus. Some pterosaurs even sported colourful crests that could have been used to attract mates. However, the pterosaurs had to share the skies with some remarkable flying dinosaurs like Microraptor. From these feathered flyers evolved the birds, who survived the K-Pg mass extinction. Some, like the swans, could gracefully fly at 30 mph as David Attenborough shows when he tracks their progress on a boat. But then the mammals managed to lift themselves up, like the nocturnal bats. The battle between the birds and the bats for aerial supremacy soon began, and David Attenborough says that in the concluding episode, he will study the Aerodynamic War.
3	"Triumph"	15 January 2015	N/A
The episode begins with Attenborough watching vultures soar around a Spanish gorge. He then travels to Rome, where he sees peregrine falcons hunt starling flocks. After that, he journeys to Ecuador, where he studies some hummingbirds as they abnormally hover over some flowers. His voyage soon takes him back to England, where he looks on as barn owls hunt mice in the cornfields. Finally, he ends his epic adventure in Borneo, as he is caught in a bird/bat/insect crossfire. He survives to recap on the history of flight: the insects taking to the air around 300 million years ago, before the reptilian pterosaurs arrive and grow to gigantic sizes. Then, a branch of the dinosaurs becomes the legendary Microraptor, which dominates the Chinese forests. These feathered dragons led to the arrival of the birds, which went on to become the aerodynamic kings. However, the bats came to battle the birds and soon a three-way aerodynamic war existed. Attenborough finishes the show by stating that this aerodynamic war still goes on today. The series ends as he slowly walks away on a rope bridge.
Extra	"The Making of David Attenborough's Conquest of the Skies"	15 January 2015	N/A
The making of the series.

== Reception ==
In a positive review, Michael D. Reid of the Times Colonist wrote, "While there's definitely an 'eww' factor to close-up footage of a housefly at work on someone's sirloin, it's also as fascinating as many other visuals and accompanying factoids that populate director David Lee's impressive documentary chronicling the wonders of aviation as practised in the natural world."
