= Tim Cragg =

Cinematographer

- Occupation: Cinematographer
- Years active: 2000–present

Tim Cragg is a British cinematographer.

== Career ==
Cragg started his career as film editor and later moved to the camera department. He is best known for his work on Netflix's Beckham, The Deepest Breath, and Fear City: New York vs the Mafia.

== Selected filmography ==
=== Film ===
- 2014 – The Last Man on the Moon
- 2015 – Containment
- 2017 – Treasures from the Wreck of the Unbelievable
- 2018 – Three Identical Strangers
- 2018 – The Serengeti Rules
- 2019 – The Great Green Wall
- 2019 – Billie
- 2019 – Secrets of the Dead: Bombing Auschwitz
- 2020 – The Edge of All We Know
- 2021 – The Lost Sons
- 2021 – The Phantom
- 2021 – Memories of a Murderer: The Nilsen Tapes
- 2022 – If These Walls Could Sing
- 2023 – The Deepest Breath
- 2023 – Anna Nicole Smith: You Don't Know Me
- 2023 – Wilding
- 2023 – David Holmes: The Boy Who Lived
- 2024 – Lover Stalker Killer

=== Television ===
- 2000-2002 – The Estate Agents
- 2005 – How Art Made the World
- 2006 – Simon Schama's Power of Art
- 2007 – The Enemies of Reason
- 2009 – The Incredible Human Journey
- 2009 – James May on the Moon
- 2009 – James May at the Edge of Space
- 2010 – Flying Monsters 3D
- 2011 – The Country House Revealed
- 2012 – Kingdom of Plants 3D
- 2012 – Chopin Saved My Life
- 2013 – The Last Days of Anne Boleyn
- 2014 – David Attenborough's Natural History Museum Alive
- 2014 – Jungle Atlantis
- 2013-2015 – Paranormal Witness
- 2016 – Forces of Nature
- 2018 – One Strange Rock
- 2019 – 8 Days: To the Moon and Back
- 2000-2020 – American Experience
- 2020 – Fear City: New York vs the Mafia
- 2021 – Curse of the Chippendales
- 2021 – Bad Sport
- 2022 – Branson
- 2023 – Beckham
- 2024 – Dante

== Awards and nominations ==
| Year | Result | Award | Category | Work | Ref. |
|---|---|---|---|---|---|
| 2007 | Won | British Academy of Film and Television Arts | Best Photography: Factual | Simon Schama's Power of Art | |
| 2010 | Nominated | British Academy of Film and Television Arts | Best Photography: Factual | How Earth Made Us | |
| 2011 | Nominated | News and Documentary Emmy Awards | Outstanding Individual Achievement in a Craft: Cinematography - Nature | How the Earth Changed History | |
| 2013 | Nominated | British Academy of Film and Television Arts | Best Photography: Factual | Kingdom of Plants 3D | |
| 2017 | Nominated | News and Documentary Emmy Awards | Outstanding Cinematography: Documentary | Forces of Nature | |
| 2020 | Nominated | News and Documentary Emmy Awards | Outstanding Cinematography: Documentary | The Serengeti Rules | |
| 2020 | Won | Raindance Film Festival | Best Cinematography | The Great Green Wall | |
| 2021 | Nominated | British Academy of Film and Television Arts | Best Photography: Factual | Fear City: New York vs the Mafia | |
| 2022 | Nominated | News and Documentary Emmy Awards | Outstanding Lighting Direction and Scenic Design | The Lost Sons | |
| 2023 | Won | Critics' Choice Documentary Awards | Best Cinematography | The Deepest Breath | |
| 2024 | Won | Sports Emmy Awards | Outstanding Long Documentary | The Deepest Breath | |
| 2024 | Nominated | Primetime Emmy Awards | Outstanding Cinematography for a Nonfiction Program | Beckham | |
