= Flying Monster =

Flying Monster may refer to:

- Flying Monsters 3D, a 2010 documentary by David Attenborough
- Flying Spaghetti Monster, the deity of a religion and a social movement
- Rodan! the Flying Monster, 1956 Japanese film
