= We Need to Talk about Dad =

- Genre: mental health; domestic violence
- Directed by: Elizabeth Stopford
- Theme music composer: Chris White
- Country of origin: United Kingdom
- Original language: English

Production
- Producer: Peter Dale
- Editor: Alex Fry

Original release
- Network: Channel 4
- Release: 21 November 2011

We Need to Talk about Dad is a 2011 television documentary film concerning mental health and domestic violence. It was aired as part of Channel 4's Cutting Edge series. The documentary was shortlisted for the 2012 British Academy Television Awards and the 2012 Grierson Awards.

== Synopsis ==
The film tells of the effects of domestic violence and mental health within a family. It documents a 24-year-old's attempts to comprehend his father's apparently impulsive behaviour in striking his mother over the head with the blunt end of an axe. The incident happened on 27 April 2004, when the son was aged 16. The parents had been married for 18 years at that time and had two sons, the eldest of which is the subject of the film.

As a result of the attack, the father was charged with attempted murder. Psychiatric evaluations indicated a "temporary psychotic episode" linked to the recent death of his own father. He blamed the suicide of his sister, which had happened many years earlier, on his own father.

Theirs was the perfect set up. Happy marriage, professional success, lovely house and gorgeous children.

— Daily Record, November 2011

The mother's determination to prevent marital breakdown led her to tell of the father's good characteristics, to ask her sons to do the same, and to encourage the eldest son to visit his father in prison. The original charge was dropped and a conviction was made for grievous bodily harm, resulting in a relatively short jail term.

When the father returned home, the eldest son had difficulty at the time in reaccepting him. However, he later respected his father for returning rather than trying to escape. In contrast, his younger brother was pleased with his father's return, having been somewhat shielded from what had happened. The parents separated six months after the father's return.

In the film, the eldest son reflects on his mother's reacceptance of his father again. In an interview with The Guardian in 2011 discussing the film the son wondered, "Is everyone capable of that?"

== Production ==
The film was directed by Elizabeth Stopford and produced by Peter Dale and Rare Day. It was edited by Alex Fry, with music by Chris White.

According to a blog post by Stopford on ProductionBase, production took place over 6 months. Stopford described the film as being less about the attack itself and more about subsequent family communication failures.

== Reception ==
The documentary was shortlisted for the 2012 British Academy Television Awards (single documentary category) and for the 2012 Grierson Awards (Deluxe 142 Best Documentary on a Contemporary Theme – Domestic category).

The Scottish Daily Record described it as "powerful stuff". It has also been noted for having numerous emotional moments.

The director reported her following of live viewer commentary during transmission, via social networking platform Twitter. One viewer was reported as commenting "... I would never take back anyone who cracked my head open with an axe, let alone make them Xmas dinner!"
