= Atomic People =

2024 British historical film

- Distributed by: BBC Two
- Release date: 31 July 2024
- Country: United Kingdom
- Language: English

Atomic People is a 2024 British television film about Hibakusha, the survivors of the atomic bombings of Hiroshima and Nagasaki. The film premiered on BBC Two on 31 July 2024. The programme received critical acclaim for its interviews with survivors and its treatment of nuclear history. It won the British Academy Television Award for Best Specialist Factual at the 2025 British Academy Television Awards. At the 2025 Venice TV Awards, Atomic People won the Special Jury Prize.

== Synopsis ==
The film documents the lives and memories of hibakusha, survivors of the atomic bombings of Hiroshima and Nagasaki, through interviews and archival material.

== Production ==
Atomic People was commissioned by BBC Two in 2023 as part of a season of programming marking 80 years since World War II’s final year.

== Reception ==
The film received critical acclaim. The Telegraph described it as "the most devastating documentary you will watch this year." The Guardian recommended it as a highlight of the week’s programming, praising its survivor testimony.

== Awards ==
- Best Specialist Factual, 2025 British Academy Television Awards
- Special Jury Prize, 2025 Venice TV Awards
