= Yu-Gi-Oh! The Movie: Pyramid of Light =

2004 Japanese-American animated adventure fantasy film by Hatsuki Tsuji

- Theatrical release poster

Japanese name
- Kanji: 遊戯王デュエルモンスターズ 光のピラミッド
- Literal meaning: Yu-Gi-Oh! Duel Monsters: Pyramid of Light
Transcriptions
- Revised Hepburn: Yū Gi Ō Dyueru Monsutāzu Hikari no Piramiddo
- Directed by: Hatsuki Tsuji
- Written by: Michael Pecerlello; Norman J. Grossfeld (Note: The Japanese script was adapted by Junki Takegami and Masahiro Hikokubo.)
- Based on: Yu-Gi-Oh! by Kazuki Takahashi and Studio Dice
- Produced by: Lloyd Goldfine; Katia Milani; Michael Pecerlello
- Starring: see below
- Music by: Elik Alvarez; Joel Douek; Freddy Sheinfeld (Note: The music was composed by Shinkichi Mitsumune for the Japanese version.)
- Production companies: Gallop; 4Kids Entertainment
- Distributed by: Warner Bros. Pictures (United States and selected territories); Toho (Japan, cinemas)
- Release dates: August 13, 2004 (United States); November 3, 2004 (Japan, limited screenings); January 5, 2005 (Japan, TV Tokyo)
- Running time: Japanese version; 102 minutes; English version; 89 minutes
- Countries: Japan; United States
- Language: English
- Budget: $20 million
- Box office: $29.2 million

Yu-Gi-Oh! The Movie: Pyramid of Light, released in Japan as Yu-Gi-Oh! Duel Monsters: Pyramid of Light (Japanese: 遊戯王デュエルモンスターズ 光のピラミッド, Hepburn: Yū Gi Ō Dyueru Monsutāzu Hikari no Piramiddo; lit. 'Game King Duel Monsters: Light Pyramid'), or simply Yu-Gi-Oh!: The Movie, is a 2004 animated adventure fantasy film based on the manga series Yu-Gi-Oh! by Kazuki Takahashi. It stars the cast of the Yu-Gi-Oh! television series in a new adventure that takes place between the third and fourth seasons of the show.

The film was first released in theaters in the United States by Warner Bros. Pictures on August 13, 2004, and was released on DVD and VHS on November 16, 2004. The film did not receive a general theatrical release in Japan, although it was shown at a special preview screening for readers of Weekly Shōnen Jump. It was subsequently broadcast on TV Tokyo and its affiliates on January 2, 2005 and on Cartoon Network's Toonami block in the United States on July 30, 2005. A remastered version of the film was released in theaters by 4K Media Inc. in 2018 on March 11 and 12 in the US, 25, April 28, and 29 in Canada and June 13 in the United Kingdom, and was released on Blu-ray by Konami Cross Media NY and Cinedigm on October 8, 2019.

== Plot ==
5,000 years ago, the heroic Pharaoh Atem imprisoned Anubis, the Egyptian lord of the dead, after he tried to destroy the world by persuading the kings to play the mysterious Shadow Games.

In the present day, Anubis' tomb is uncovered by archaeologists, amazed by his strongest and most valuable treasure: the Pyramid of Light. At the same time, Yugi Muto assembles the Millennium Puzzle which contains Atem's soul, releasing dozens of monsters and turning Yugi into the heroic Pharaoh Atem (referred to by fans as Yami Yugi) who banishes the monsters back to the shadow realm. A devastating spiritual force is unleashed from the relic, liberating the Egyptian sorcerer. Anubis, now free, intends to conclude his plan.

3 years later, the Battle City Finals have recently concluded, (Note: As depicted in Yu-Gi-Oh! Duel Monsters) and Yugi has achieved international fame by defeating his arch-rival Seto Kaiba and obtaining the 3 Egyptian God Cards: Slifer the Sky Dragon, Obelisk the Tormentor, and the Winged Dragon of Ra. Kaiba, determined to defeat Yugi once and for all, turns to Maximillion Pegasus, the creator of the Duel Monsters card game, to obtain any new cards designed to defeat the almighty God Cards. Pegasus tells Kaiba that he has a card he is looking for, but will only give it to Kaiba if he can beat him in a duel. Kaiba defeats Pegasus and claims 2 cards, one of which was secretly planted by Anubis.

Meanwhile, Yugi and Téa Gardner go to the local museum where Anubis' corpse and the Pyramid of Light are on display. They meet up with Yugi's grandfather, Solomon, who reads a foreboding prophecy:

The eye that sees what's yet to come
Its vision shall be fulfilled
Unless blinded by events predetermined
Thus light and shadows both be killed

It is then that the vengefully dark spirit of Anubis attacks the group, with Yugi having a vision of Anubis himself manipulating Kaiba and Yami Yugi being hurt in a Shadow Game. He awakens to find Anubis' body and the Pyramid of Light missing. Kaiba's younger brother Mokuba arrives, and Yugi is taken to Kaiba's Duel Dome with his friends Joey Wheeler and Tristan Taylor in pursuit. Kaiba forces Yami Yugi into a duel, unaware that Anubis is manipulating him into using one of the 2 new cards, Pyramid of Light, which covers the field in a huge replica of the actual pyramid and destroys the God Cards. Yugi, Joey, and Tristan are sucked into the pyramid while Mokuba flees the crumbling building.

Yugi, Joey, and Tristan awaken within the Millennium Puzzle, finding Anubis' tomb within. Anubis reveals that his monsters will destroy the modern world. Yami Yugi and Kaiba continue their duel, each blow to their in-game Life Points draining away their physical energy. Compounding matters, Kaiba's Deck Destruction Virus sends more than half of Yami's deck to the Graveyard, leaving him with barely any cards, and attacks from his Blue-Eyes Ultimate Dragon and Blue-Eyes Shining Dragon (his 2nd new card), both with 4500 Attack Points, drop Yami's Life Points to 200. Pegasus figures out what is going on and arrives in a helicopter to rescue Téa, Solomon, and Mokuba. Téa sends her soul into the Millennium Puzzle to aid Yugi, Joey, and Tristan. Yugi finds the Dagger of Fate within Anubis' tomb and uses it to destroy the all-seeing eye, as predicted by the prophecy.

When Kaiba deviates from Anubis' plan and attempts to destroy the Pyramid of Light, Anubis materializes, casts Kaiba aside, and takes command of the duel, leading Yami to discover that Anubis is the real mastermind behind the duel. Yami, reunited with Yugi, destroys the Pyramid of Light card with Blue-Eyes Shining Dragon and then uses Kaiba's planned strategy to summon the God Cards and end the duel by destroying Anubis.

However, Anubis transforms into a monster and allows any monster to become real when summoned. This proves to be his undoing when Yugi and Yami summon Blue-Eyes Shining Dragon to defeat Anubis, ultimately destroying him for good. An injured Kaiba departs with Mokuba, with the promise to defeat Yugi the next time they meet. Yugi thanks the spirit of Yami, and his 3 best friends for their strong enduring friendship which he claims makes him a true winner.

== Voice cast ==
Character	Japanese	English
Yugi Mutou / Yami Yugi	Shunsuke Kazama	Dan Green
Seto Kaiba	Kenjiro Tsuda	Eric Stuart
Anubis	Kōji Ishii	Scott Rayow
Joey Wheeler	Hiroki Takahashi	Wayne Grayson
Tristan Taylor	Hidehiro Kikuchi	Greg Abbey
Téa Gardner	Maki Saitou	Amy Birnbaum
Mokuba Kaiba	Junko Takeuchi	Tara Jayne
Solomon Mutou	Tadashi Miyazawa	Maddie Blaustein
Maximillion Pegasus	Jiro J. Takasugi	Darren Dunstan

== Soundtrack ==
Yu-Gi-Oh! The Movie Soundtrack

Soundtrack album by Yu-Gi-Oh!
- Released: August 10, 2004
- Recorded: 2004
- Genres: Rock, pop, hip-hop
- Length: 44:46
- Labels: 4Kids Entertainment, RCA
- Producers: John Siegler, Sa-Ra Creative Partners, Paul "DJ White Shadow" Blair, Eddie Montilla, Jean Rodríguez, Wayne Sharp, Shep Goodman, Kenny Gioia, Herminio Quiroz, Ron Riley, Russell Velázquez, Jen Scaturro, Julian Schwartz, Jake Siegler, Alex Walker

Yu-Gi-Oh! chronology
Yu-Gi-Oh! Music to Duel By (2002)	Yu-Gi-Oh! The Movie Soundtrack (2004)

Professional ratings
Review scores
Source	Rating
AllMusic	3/5 stars

Yu-Gi-Oh! The Movie Soundtrack feature various vocal artists (most notably The Black Eyed Peas, who contributed the song "For the People") from the English version. It was released on August 10, 2004, on RCA on Audio CD and Compact Cassette. The score for the film was never released.

No.	Title	Writer(s)	Performer(s)	Length
1.	"You're Not Me"	Norman J. Grossfeld, John Siegler	Marty Bags	3:16
2.	"For the People"	Will Adams, Taz Arnold, Paul "DJ White Shadow" Blair, Jamie A. Dávila "Tame" Gómez, Shafiq Husayn	The Black Eyed Peas	4:01
3.	"One Card Short"	Norman J. Grossfeld, John Siegler	James Chatton	3:50
4.	"Step Up"	Eddie Montilla, Paul "DJ White Shadow" Blair	Jean Rodríguez	3:53
5.	"Shadow Games"	Paul "DJ White Shadow" Blair, Wayne Sharpe	Trixie Reiss	3:32
6.	"It's Over"	Paul "DJ White Shadow" Blair	Fatty Koo	3:49
7.	"Blind Ambition"	Russel Velazquez	The Deleted	3:18
8.	"The Great Pretender"	Jon Frederik	The Jon Frederik Band	3:14
9.	"How Much Longer"	Jen Scaturro	Jen Scaturro	3:12
10.	"U Better Fear Me"	Russel Velazquez, Paul "DJ White Shadow" Blair	The Deleted	4:17
11.	"Power Within"	Wayne Sharpe, Paul "DJ White Shadow" Blair	Dan Metreyeon	3:09
12.	"Believe In"	Paul "DJ White Shadow" Blair, Jake Siegler, Alex (Llocks) Walker	Skwib	3:07
13.	"Yu-Gi-Oh! Theme"		Paul "DJ White Shadow" Blair	2:07

The Japanese version features "Fire" by the rock band BLAZE as its theme song. The song was subsequently included on the 2005 compilation album Yu-Gi-Oh! Duel Monsters Duel Vocal Best. Five newly recorded musical pieces used in the Japanese version of the film were included on Yu-Gi-Oh! Duel Monsters Sound Duel 4, released on 25 March 2005.

== Production ==
In July 2003, it was announced that Warner Bros. Pictures had acquired the distribution rights outside Asia to a feature-length Yu-Gi-Oh! film, hoping to replicate the success of the first three Pokémon films. Unlike the earlier Pokémon films, which had been produced primarily for Japanese audiences, Yu-Gi-Oh! The Movie was developed in Japan specifically for an American theatrical premiere. Animation historian Fred Patten described the production as a departure from the traditional distribution model for Japanese animated films. The film was produced by 4Kids Entertainment in association with Shueisha, TV Tokyo and Nihon Ad Systems.

The animation was produced by Gallop in Tokyo, with production assistance from South Korea's Dong Woo Animation. Hatsuki Tsuji directed the film and also served as character designer and chief animation director, while Hidekazu Shimamura was responsible for monster designs. The Japanese production credits identify Junki Takegami and Masahiro Hikokubo as screenwriters. The American Film Institute lists Matthew Drdek, Lloyd Goldfine, Norman J. Grossfeld and Michael Pecoriello as screenplay writers, with Takegami and Hikokubo credited for the story.

The Japanese-language version of the film is longer than the American release. The Japanese DVD has a listed running time of 101 minutes, compared with the 89-minute American theatrical version. The Japanese production credits identify Shinkichi Mitsumune as composer, while the American Film Institute credits Elik Alvarez, John Angier, Joel Douek, Ralph Schuckett, Wayne Sharpe, Freddy Sheinfeld and Gil Talmi for the music of the American release.

== Promotion ==
To promote the film's American theatrical release, Warner Bros. Pictures distributed one of four exclusive Yu-Gi-Oh! Trading Card Game cards—"Pyramid of Light", "Sorcerer of Dark Magic", "Watapon", or "Blue-Eyes Shining Dragon"—to cinema attendees with each admission, while supplies lasted. Warner Bros. announced plans to distribute 10 million promotional cards to cinemas beginning on August 13, 2004.

=== Novelization ===
A tie-in novelization for the film was released in 2004, written by Junki Takegami. The novel is divided into a prologue, 5 chapters, and an epilogue. It is virtually identical in terms of plot, save for a few minor changes, such as explaining that Akhenaden created the Pyramid of Light for his son Seto as a failed recreation of the Millennium Puzzle, and extra exposition, such as giving out detailed deck-lists for each character. The novel was never released and translated to English, and is now rare as it has gone out of print.

== Release ==
=== Box office ===
Yu-Gi-Oh! – The Movie: Pyramid of Light opened at 2,411 screens across the U.S. and made a theater screen average of $3,934. By the end of the weekend, it made $9,485,494 and place #4 on the Box Office Top 10 behind Collateral, The Princess Diaries 2: Royal Engagement, and Alien vs. Predator, which opened up on the same day and took the #1 position. It is currently the #3 Japanese animated film in the US Box Office, after Pokémon: The First Movie and Pokémon: The Movie 2000. The film grossed $19,765,868 in the United States and Canada, with only $29,170,410 worldwide, making it a box-office bomb compared to the success of the first three Pokémon films dubbed by the same company.

=== Theatrical re-releases ===
A digitally remastered version of the film received a limited theatrical re-release in the United States on March 11 and 12, 2018, presented by Fathom Events and 4K Media in nearly 800 cinemas. The screenings included a preview of the English-language premiere of Yu-Gi-Oh! VRAINS. The remastered film was also screened in approximately 30 cinemas across the United Kingdom on June 13, 2018, distributed by Manga Entertainment.

=== Home media ===
Warner Home Video released Yu-Gi-Oh! The Movie on DVD and VHS in the United States on November 16, 2004. The DVD included a monster-themed memory game, two music videos and a promotional trading card, alongside a mail-in offer for three additional cards.

In the United Kingdom, Warner Home Video released the film on DVD on December 27, 2004. It peaked at number 48 on the Official DVD Chart and number 46 on the Official Video Chart, remaining in the top 100 of both charts for three weeks in January 2005.

In Japan, Pony Canyon released the film on DVD on March 16, 2005, with two commemorative postcards and a special storage box included with initial copies. Warner Home Video subsequently released the film on DVD in France on June 8, 2005 and Germany on July 15, 2005.

A report published by Japan's Ministry of Land, Infrastructure, Transport and Tourism, drawing on research by the Japan External Trade Organization, ranked Yu-Gi-Oh! The Movie first in a North American anime DVD annual sales ranking, ahead of Inuyasha the Movie: Affections Touching Across Time and Spirited Away.

A digitally remastered version was released on DVD and Blu-ray in the United Kingdom by Manga Entertainment on October 8, 2018. The film made its Blu-ray debut in the United States on October 8, 2019. A commemorative SteelBook Blu-ray edition was subsequently released in North America on September 10, 2024 to mark the film's twentieth anniversary.

=== Critical reception ===
The film was panned by critics in America. On the review aggregator website Rotten Tomatoes, 6% of 66 critics' reviews are positive, with an average rating of 3.5/10. The website's consensus reads: "Don't watch the TV show or play the card game? Then this movie is not for you." Metacritic, which uses a weighted average, assigned the film a score of 15 out of 100, based on 18 critics, indicating "overwhelming dislike".

In a retrospective review for the Radio Times Guide to Films, film critic Lucy Barrick awarded the film two stars out of five, describing the narrative as "largely incomprehensible" and the animation as "bog-standard".
