= Memories of a Murderer: The Nilsen Tapes =

- Promotional poster
- Directed by: Michael Harte
- Produced by: Gaby Aung
- Cinematography: Tim Cragg
- Edited by: Michael Harte
- Music by: Andrew Skeet
- Production companies: Netflix Raw TV Eleven
- Distributed by: Netflix
- Release date: 18 August 2021
- Running time: 84 minutes
- Country: United Kingdom
- Language: English

Memories of a Murderer: The Nilsen Tapes is a British documentary film created for Netflix and directed by Michael Harte. The film details the life and murders of Scottish serial killer Dennis Nilsen, first-hand through audiotapes that were recorded from his jail cell.
