= Doug Allan =

Scottish wildlife cameraman (1951–2026)

Doug Allan OBE FRPS FRSGS
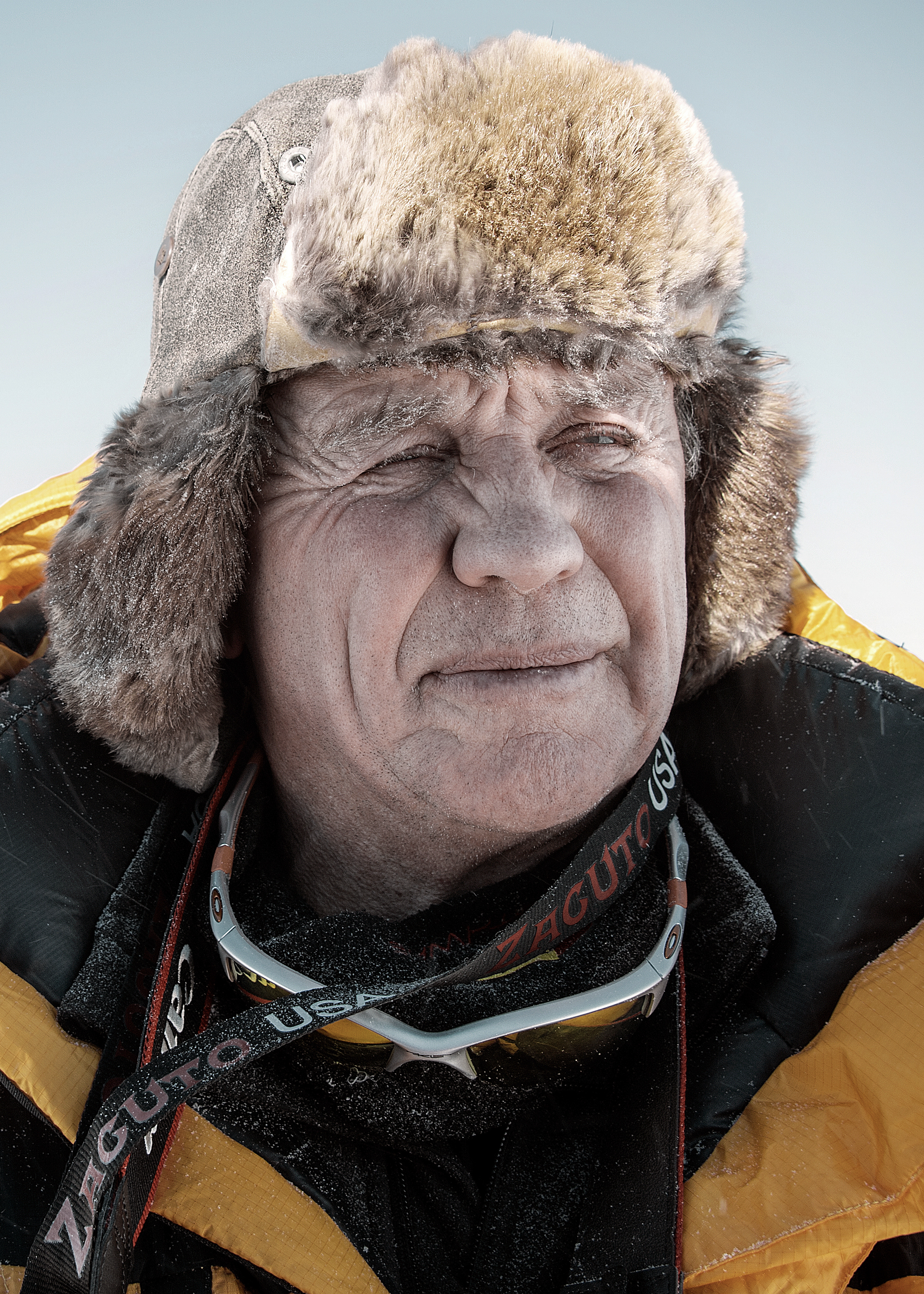
- Allan in 2013
- Born: Douglas George Allan; 17 July 1951; Dunfermline, Scotland
- Died: 8 April 2026 (aged 74); Pokhara, Nepal
- Education: University of Stirling
- Occupations: Cameraman; photographer
- Notable work: The Blue Planet; Planet Earth; Frozen Planet
- Website: dougallan.com

Douglas George Allan OBE FRPS FRSGS (17 July 1951 – 8 April 2026) was a Scottish wildlife cameraman and photographer best known for his work in polar regions and underwater. After working as a diver, scientist and photographer in Antarctica, for which he was awarded the Polar Medal in 1983, he became a full-time cinematographer and was a principal cameraman on many BBC wildlife programmes. He won multiple awards for his cinematography work, including eight Emmy Awards.

== Life and career ==
Douglas George Allan was one of twin brothers born on 17 July 1951 in Dunfermline, Scotland, the son of a photographer and photojournalist who ran his own photography shop in the town. As a child, Allan became a keen snorkeller and underwater diver, which inspired him to study marine biology at the University of Stirling. His first job was as a pearl diver with Bill Abernathy, the last pearl hunter in Scotland. Allan then worked for eight years for the British Antarctic Survey in Antarctica as a research diver, scientist and photographer.

Becoming a full-time cinematographer in 1985, Allan was a principal cameraman on many BBC wildlife programmes, particularly concerning extreme environments, including Life in the Freezer, Wildlife Special: Polar Bear, The Blue Planet, Planet Earth, and Frozen Planet.

He won eight Emmy Awards, including Outstanding Cinematography for Nonfiction Programming in 2002 for The Blue Planet, and in 2007 for Planet Earth. He won four British Academy Film Awards and in 2017 he won an outstanding contribution award at the British Academy Scotland Awards. He also delivered lecture tours. Towards the end of his life, Allan campaigned for environmental issues and gave his support to a Scottish legal proposal on ecocide.

Allan appeared on BBC Radio 4's The Museum of Curiosity in November 2019. His hypothetical donation to this imaginary museum was "The feeling you get when a wild animal trusts you".

Allan died on 8 April 2026, at the age of 74, in hospital in the city of Pokhara, Nepal, from a brain haemorrhage after falling ill during a climbing trip.

== Recognition ==
In 2012, Allan was awarded an Honorary Fellowship of the Royal Photographic Society (FRPS). He was made an Honorary Fellow of the Royal Scottish Geographical Society (FRSGS) in 2014, and was appointed an Officer of the Order of the British Empire (OBE) in the 2024 Birthday Honours "for services to the Broadcast Media and to the Promotion of Environmental Awareness".

=== Awards and nominations ===
| Year | Award | Category | Nominee(s) | Result | Ref |
|---|---|---|---|---|---|
| 1983 | Polar Medal | | Himself | Won | |
| 1993 | Cherry Kearton Medal | | Himself | Won | |
| 1994 | British Academy Television Craft Awards | Best Film or Video Photography: Factual | Life in the Freezer (as part of the camera team) | Won | |
| 1998 | British Academy Television Craft Awards | Best Photography: Factual | Wildlife: Polar Bear: The Arctic Warrior | Won | |
| 2002 | Primetime Emmy Awards | Outstanding Cinematography for Nonfiction Programming (Single or Multi-Camera) | The Blue Planet (Episode: "Seas of Life: Ocean World") | Won | |
| 2002 | British Academy Television Craft Awards | Best Photography: Factual | The Blue Planet (as part of the camera team) | Won | |
| 2006 | Wildscreen Panda Awards | Cinematography | Planet Earth | Won | |
| 2007 | Primetime Emmy Awards | Outstanding Cinematography for Nonfiction Programming | Planet Earth (Episode: "Pole to Pole") | Won | |
| 2010 | Polar Medal | | Himself | Won | |
| 2010 | Primetime Emmy Awards | Outstanding Cinematography for a Nonfiction Program | Life (Episode: "Challenges of Life") (as part of the cinematography team) | Won | |
| 2011 | British Academy Television Craft Awards | Best Photography: Factual | Human Planet (Episode: "Arctic – Life in the Deep Freeze") | Won | |
| 2017 | British Academy Scotland Awards | Outstanding Contribution to Craft | Himself | Won | |
