= 2012 British Academy Television Awards =

UK television awards ceremony

- Date: 27 May 2012
- Site: Royal Festival Hall
- Hosted by: Dara Ó Briain

Highlights
- Best Comedy Series: Stewart Lee's Comedy Vehicle
- Best Drama: The Fades
- Best Actor: Dominic West; Appropriate Adult
- Best Actress: Emily Watson; Appropriate Adult
- Best Comedy Performance: Darren Boyd Spy; Jennifer Saunders Absolutely Fabulous
- Most awards: Appropriate Adult (3)
- Most nominations: Appropriate Adult/Sherlock (4)

Television coverage
- Channel: BBC One
- Ratings: 3.62 million

The 2012 British Academy Television Awards (formally known as the Arqiva British Academy Television Awards) were held on 27 May 2012 at the Royal Festival Hall in London. The nominees were announced on 24 April 2012. Rolf Harris was awarded the BAFTA Fellowship, but this was annulled two years later following his conviction for sexual offences.

== Winners and nominees ==
Winners are listed first and highlighted in boldface.

=== Leading Actor ===
Dominic West - Appropriate Adult (ITV)

- Benedict Cumberbatch - Sherlock (BBC One)
- Joseph Gilgun - This Is England '88 (Channel 4)
- John Simm - Exile (BBC One)

=== Leading Actress ===
Emily Watson - Appropriate Adult (ITV)

- Romola Garai - The Crimson Petal and the White (BBC Two)
- Nadine Marshall - Random (Channel 4)
- Vicky McClure - This Is England '88 (Channel 4)

=== Supporting Actor ===
Andrew Scott - Sherlock (BBC One)

- Martin Freeman - Sherlock (BBC One)
- Joseph Mawle - Birdsong (BBC One)
- Stephen Rea - The Shadow Line (BBC Two)

=== Supporting Actress ===
Monica Dolan - Appropriate Adult (ITV)

- Anna Chancellor - The Hour (BBC Two)
- Miranda Hart - Call the Midwife (BBC One)
- Maggie Smith - Downton Abbey (ITV)

=== Entertainment Performance ===
Graham Norton - The Graham Norton Show (BBC One)

- Alan Carr - Alan Carr: Chatty Man (Channel 4)
- Harry Hill - Harry Hill's TV Burp (ITV)
- Dara Ó Briain - Mock the Week (BBC Two)

=== Female Performance in a Comedy Programme ===
Jennifer Saunders - Absolutely Fabulous (BBC One)

- Olivia Colman - Twenty Twelve (BBC Four)
- Tamsin Greig - Friday Night Dinner (Channel 4)
- Ruth Jones - Stella (Sky One)

=== Male Performance in a Comedy Programme ===
Darren Boyd - Spy (Sky One)

- Hugh Bonneville - Twenty Twelve (BBC Four)
- Tom Hollander - Rev. (BBC Two)
- Brendan O'Carroll - Mrs. Brown's Boys (BBC One)

=== Single Drama ===
Random (Channel 4)

- Holy Flying Circus (BBC Four)
- Page Eight (BBC Two)
- Stolen (BBC One)

=== Mini Series ===
This Is England '88 (Channel 4)

- Appropriate Adult (ITV)
- The Crimson Petal and the White (BBC Two)
- Top Boy (Channel 4)

=== Drama Series ===
The Fades (BBC Three)

- Misfits (E4)
- Scott and Bailey (ITV)
- Spooks (MI-5) (BBC)

=== Soap and Continuing Drama ===
Coronation Street (ITV)

- EastEnders (BBC One)
- Holby City (BBC One)
- Shameless (Channel 4)

=== International ===
Borgen (BBC Four)

- The Killing (BBC Four)
- Modern Family (Sky One)
- The Slap (BBC Four)

=== Factual Series ===
Our War (BBC Three)

- The Choir: Military Wives (BBC Two)
- Educating Essex (Channel 4)
- Protecting Our Children: Damned If We Do, Damned If We Don't (BBC Two)

=== Specialist Factual ===
Mummifying Alan: Egypt's Last Secret (Channel 4)

- British Masters (BBC Four)
- Frozen Planet (BBC One)
- Wonders of the Universe (BBC Two)

=== Single Documentary ===
Terry Pratchett: Choosing to Die (BBC Two)

- 9/11: The Day That Changed the World (ITV)
- The Fight of Their Lives (ITV)
- We Need To Talk About Dad (Channel 4)

=== Features ===
The Great British Bake Off (BBC Two)

- DIY SOS: The Big Build (BBC One)
- Hairy Bikers' Meals on Wheels (BBC Two)
- Timothy Spall: Back at Sea (BBC Four)

=== Reality and Constructed Factual ===
Young Apprentice (BBC One)

- An Idiot Abroad (Sky One)
- Don't Tell the Bride (BBC Three)
- Made in Chelsea (E4)

=== Current Affairs ===
Undercover Care: The Abuse Exposed (BBC One)

- Bahrain: Shouting in the Dark (Al Jazeera English)
- Sri Lanka's Killing Fields (Channel 4)
- The Truth About Adoption (BBC One)

=== News Coverage ===
Channel 4 News: Japan Earthquake (Channel 4)

- BBC News at Ten: Siege of Homs (BBC One)
- ITV News at Ten: Battle of Misrata (ITV)
- Sky News: Libya Rebel Convoy – Live (Sky News)

=== Sport and Live Event ===
The Royal Wedding (BBC One)

- Frankenstein's Wedding: Live in Leeds (BBC Three)
- 2011 Rugby World Cup final (ITV)
- 2011 Tour de France (ITV4)

=== New Media ===
Psychoville (BBC Online)

- Autumnwatch (BBC Online)
- The Bank Job (Channel4.com)
- Misfits (E4.com)

=== Entertainment Programme ===
Derren Brown: The Experiments (Channel 4)

- Celebrity Juice (ITV2)
- Harry Hill's TV Burp (ITV)
- Michael McIntyre’s Christmas Comedy Roadshow (BBC One)

=== Comedy Programme ===
Stewart Lee's Comedy Vehicle (BBC Two)

- Charlie Brooker’s 2011 Wipe (BBC Four)
- Comic Strip: The Hunt for Tony Blair (Channel 4)
- The Cricklewood Greats (BBC Four)

=== Situation Comedy ===
Mrs. Brown's Boys (BBC One)

- Fresh Meat (Channel 4)
- Friday Night Dinner (Channel 4)
- Rev (BBC Two)

=== YouTube Audience Award ===
Celebrity Juice (ITV2)

- Educating Essex (Channel 4)
- Fresh Meat (Channel 4)
- Frozen Planet (BBC One)
- Sherlock (BBC One)
- The Great British Bake Off (BBC Two)

=== Fellowship ===
- **Rolf Harris** (annulled in 2014)

=== Special Award ===
- **Steven Moffat**

== See also ==
- 2012 British Academy Television Craft Awards
- 2012 British Academy Scotland Awards
- 2012 British Academy Cymru Awards
