= The Lost Sons =

2021 film directed by Ursula Macfarlane

- Directed by: Ursula Macfarlane
- Produced by: Gagan Rehill
- Cinematography: Neil Harvey; Tim Cragg; Jean-Louis Schuller; Isaac Mead-Long
- Edited by: Andy R. Worboys
- Music by: Segun Akinola
- Production companies: CNN Films; Campfire; Raw
- Distributed by: Warner Bros. Domestic Television Distribution; Warner Bros. International Television Distribution
- Release date: March 16, 2021 (SXSW)
- Running time: 98 minutes
- Countries: United States; United Kingdom
- Language: English

The Lost Sons is a 2021 American-British documentary film, directed by Ursula Macfarlane and premiered at South by Southwest on March 16. It follows Paul Fronczak, a man who discovers he had been abandoned as a child and mistakenly returned to another family whose young son was missing, then learns the identity his biological mother gave him and the whereabouts of the "real" Paul Fronczak.

== Synopsis ==
The film follows, and is largely narrated by, a man who was raised as "Paul Fronczak" by a Chicago couple whom he was led to believe were his biological parents. Born in 1964, he stumbled across newspaper clippings at his family home when he was 10 years old. The news reports featured his parents grieving over a kidnapped baby son, then celebrating when he was recovered two years later, apparently abandoned by the kidnapper. In the 2010s, now in his 50s, Paul began an extensive investigation involving DNA tests, private investigators, and tapping into his media contacts for publicity, to determine what really happened. After many twists and turns, he discovers that he was not the kidnapped child, that his real name is Jack Rosenthal (from Atlantic City, New Jersey), that he has a still missing twin sister named Jill, and that the real Paul Fronczak is still alive and known by an adoptive name.

== Production ==
Ursula Macfarlane directed the film which CNN Films and Raw TV produced.

== Release ==
The film had its world premiere at South by Southwest on March 16, 2021.

== Reception ==
The Lost Sons received positive reviews from critics. The review aggregator website Rotten Tomatoes surveyed 20 critics and, categorizing the reviews as positive or negative, assessed 16 as positive and 4 as negative for an 80% rating. Among the reviews, it determined an average rating of 6.4 out of 10.
