= Tim Allen =

American actor and comedian (born 1953)

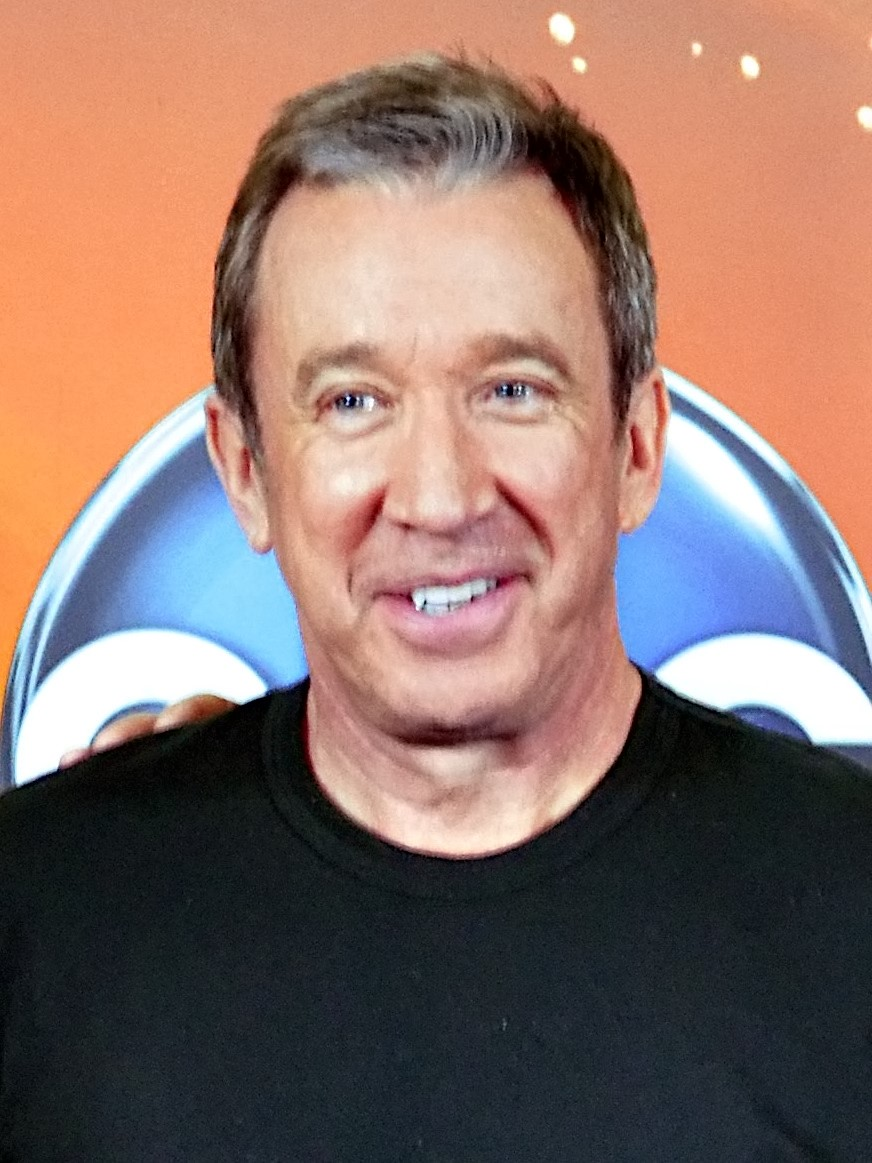
- Allen in 2012
- Born: Timothy Alan Dick; June 13, 1953 (age 73); Denver, Colorado, U.S.
- Education: Western Michigan University (BS)
- Occupations: Actor; comedian
- Years active: 1975–present
- Political party: Republican
- Spouses: Laura Deibel (m. 1984; div. 2003); Jane Hajduk (m. 2006)
- Children: 2

Comedy career
- Medium: Stand-up, film, television
- Genres: Observational comedy, physical comedy, surreal humour
- Subjects: Marriage, gender differences, family, everyday life, physical comedy, social awkwardness, politics

Timothy Alan Dick (born June 13, 1953), known professionally as Tim Allen, is an American actor and comedian. He is known for playing Tim "The Toolman" Taylor on the ABC sitcom Home Improvement (1991–1999) for which he won a Golden Globe Award and Mike Baxter on the ABC/Fox sitcom Last Man Standing (2011–2021). He voices Buzz Lightyear for the Toy Story franchise (1995–present) for which he won an Annie Award and played Scott Calvin and Santa Claus in The Santa Clause franchise (1994–2023).

Allen's other films include Jungle 2 Jungle (1997), Galaxy Quest (1999), Joe Somebody (2001), Big Trouble (2002), Christmas with the Kranks (2004), The Shaggy Dog (2006), Wild Hogs (2007), The Six Wives of Henry Lefay (2009), and Crazy on the Outside (2010).

== Early life and education ==
Allen was born in Denver, Colorado, on June 13, 1953. He is the third oldest of six children of Martha Katherine (née Fox), a community-service worker, and Gerald M. Dick, a real estate agent. Allen has two older brothers named David and Stephen, two younger brothers named Jeffrey and Bruce, and a younger sister named Rebecca. His father died in a car accident in November 1964, colliding with a drunk driver when Allen was 11. Two years later, his mother married her high school sweetheart, a business executive, and moved with her six children to Birmingham, Michigan, to be with her new husband and his three children. Allen has said the move meant going from "being in a cool group at one school to being at the bottom [of the social hierarchy at another]."

Allen attended Seaholm High School in Birmingham, where he was in theater and music classes (resulting in his love of classical piano). He then attended Central Michigan University before transferring to Western Michigan University in 1974. At Western Michigan, Allen worked at the student radio station WIDR. In 1976, he earned a Bachelor of Science degree in communications, specializing in radio and television production, with a split minor in philosophy and design.

== Career ==
=== 1975–1990: Standup comedy and film debut ===
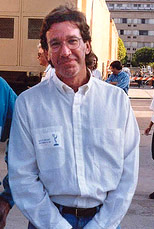
Allen in 1993

Allen started his career as a comedian in 1975. On a dare from one of his friends, he participated in a comedy night at Mark Ridley's Comedy Castle in Royal Oak, a suburb of Detroit. While in Detroit he began to get recognition appearing in local television commercials and appearing on cable comedy shows such as Gary Thison's Some Semblance of Sanity. Following his release from prison in 1981, he returned to comedy. He moved to Los Angeles and became a regular performer at The Comedy Store. He began performing stand-up appearances on late-night talk shows and specials on record and film. In 1998, Western Michigan awarded Allen an honorary fine arts degree and the Distinguished Alumni Award. In a magazine interview, Allen once said, "I can only play a part if I can draw on personal experience, and that well can go dry pretty quickly". His initial film debut was as a baggage handler in Tropical Snow (1988).

=== 1991–2010: Home Improvement and franchise roles ===
Allen rose to fame in acting with the sitcom Home Improvement (1991–1999) produced for ABC by Wind Dancer Productions. Allen played the main character Tim "The Tool-Man" Taylor, the father of three boys. Much of the show was based on his stand-up comedy act. In November 1994, Allen simultaneously starred in the highest-grossing film (Walt Disney Pictures's The Santa Clause), topped The New York Times bestseller list with his book Don't Stand Too Close to a Naked Man, and appeared in the top-rated television series (Home Improvement) within one week. For his role on the show, Allen won a Golden Globe Award in 1995. Home Improvement ran until 1999, for which he was paid US$1.25 million per episode during the eighth and final season.

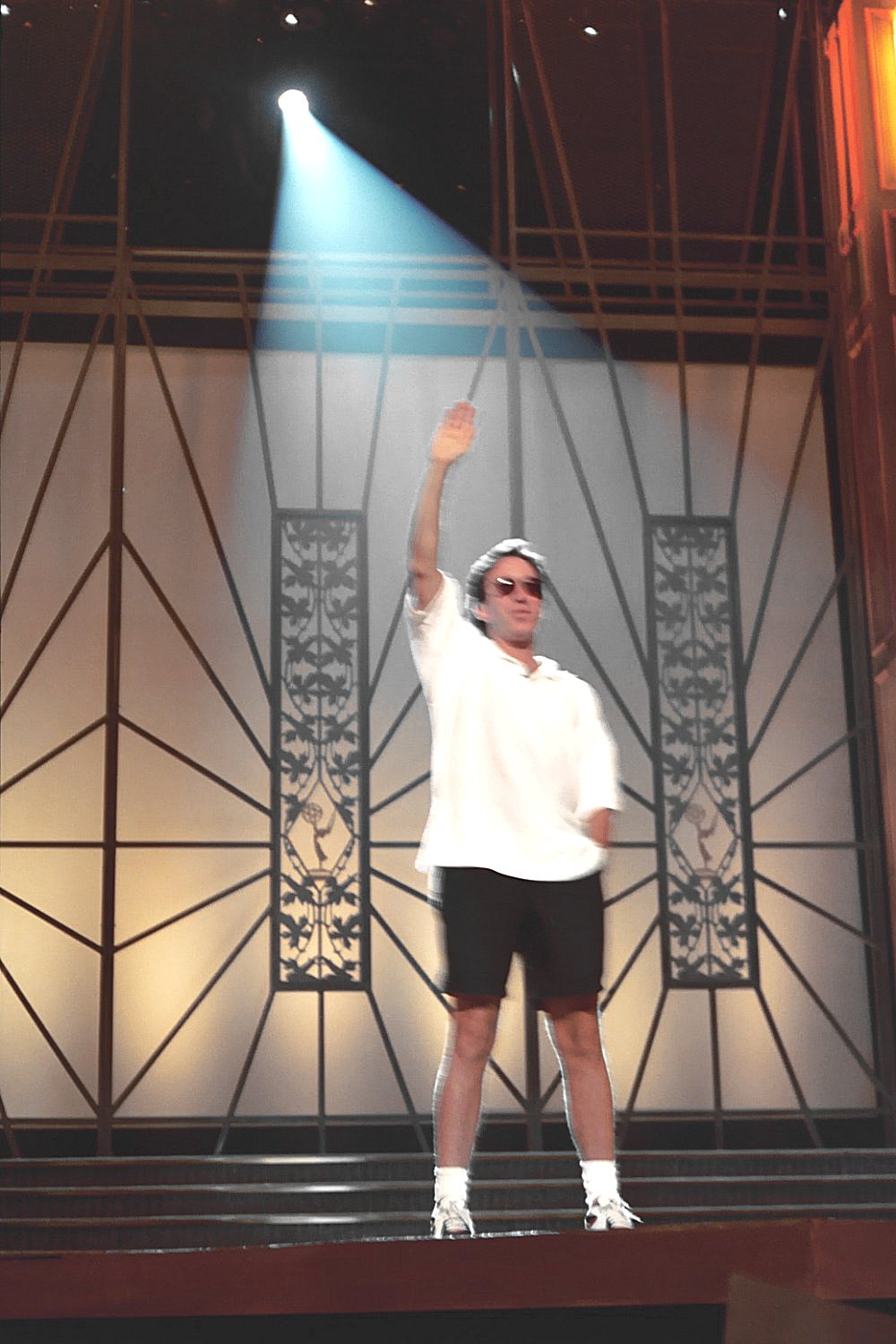
Allen at the 45th Emmy Awards, 1994

In 1995, Allen provided the voice of Buzz Lightyear in the Disney/Pixar blockbuster Toy Story. In 1997, he starred in the family comedy Jungle 2 Jungle from Disney. In 1999, he returned to voice Buzz Lightyear in Toy Story 2, which was a financial and critical hit. That same year, he starred in the sci-fi parody Galaxy Quest alongside Sigourney Weaver, Alan Rickman, and Sam Rockwell. In 2002, he reprised his role as Scott Calvin in The Santa Clause 2. Two years later, he starred as Luther Krank in Christmas with the Kranks. In 2006, Zoom was released, starring Allen as Jack Shepard. The same year, he also starred in The Shaggy Dog and The Santa Clause 3. The year 2008 marked his first dramatic turn with a supporting role as an aging action film star in David Mamet's Redbelt.

Allen began narrating the "Pure Michigan" television and radio commercials for the "Travel Michigan" agency. These commercials can be seen and heard throughout the Midwest and began airing nationally in 2009. In December 2009, he started a preview tour of Crazy on the Outside, a film that debuted in January 2010. Allen accompanied the film, helping promote it with a series of stand-up acts beforehand. During the performances, he told audiences he planned a 2010 comedy tour. Allen also directed the film, marking his film directorial debut.

Allen hosted the 8th Annual TV Land Awards on April 25, 2010. That same year, he reprised the role of Buzz Lightyear in Toy Story 3 and also became the official voice of the Chevrolet Cruze, narrating commercials for the vehicle, and he became the voice of Campbell Soup Company's "It's Amazing What Soup Can Do" campaign.

=== 2011–present: Last Man Standing and other roles ===
Allen returned to ABC with the sitcom Last Man Standing (2011–2021). He played the role of Mike Baxter, a conservative father fighting for his manhood in a house filled with women. The character is loosely based on his own life. After six seasons, the show was canceled in May 2017. On May 11, 2018, Fox TV's CEOs and chairmen Gary Newman and Dana Walden said Fox had officially picked up Last Man Standing for a seventh season. The show ended in May 2021 after nine seasons.

Shortly before the 2017 cancellation of Last Man Standing, Allen had been announced as part of the cast of the Netflix original comedy film El Camino Christmas (2017). In 2018, he had a cameo voice role as Buzz Lightyear in Ralph Breaks the Internet. In 2019, he voiced the character in Toy Story 4 and appeared as himself in No Safe Spaces, a documentary film. In 2022, it was announced that Allen would reprise the role of Scott Calvin in a Disney+ mini-series, The Santa Clauses, based on The Santa Clause franchise. On June 30, 2022, the History Channel series More Power premiered, with co-host Allen reunited with Richard Karn. The show covered the history of tools and included field reports of people who use powerful tools.

On March 6, 2024, Allen announced on his Facebook page that he would be starring in a third sitcom called Shifting Gears. His character is Matt, a “stubborn, widowed owner of a classic car restoration shop. When Matt’s estranged daughter and her teenage kids move into his house, the real restoration begins.” The series premiered on ABC on January 8, 2025, and was picked up for a second season, which also premiered in 2025. In 2026, he reprised his role as Buzz Lightyear in Toy Story 5.

== Personal life ==
=== Marriages and family ===
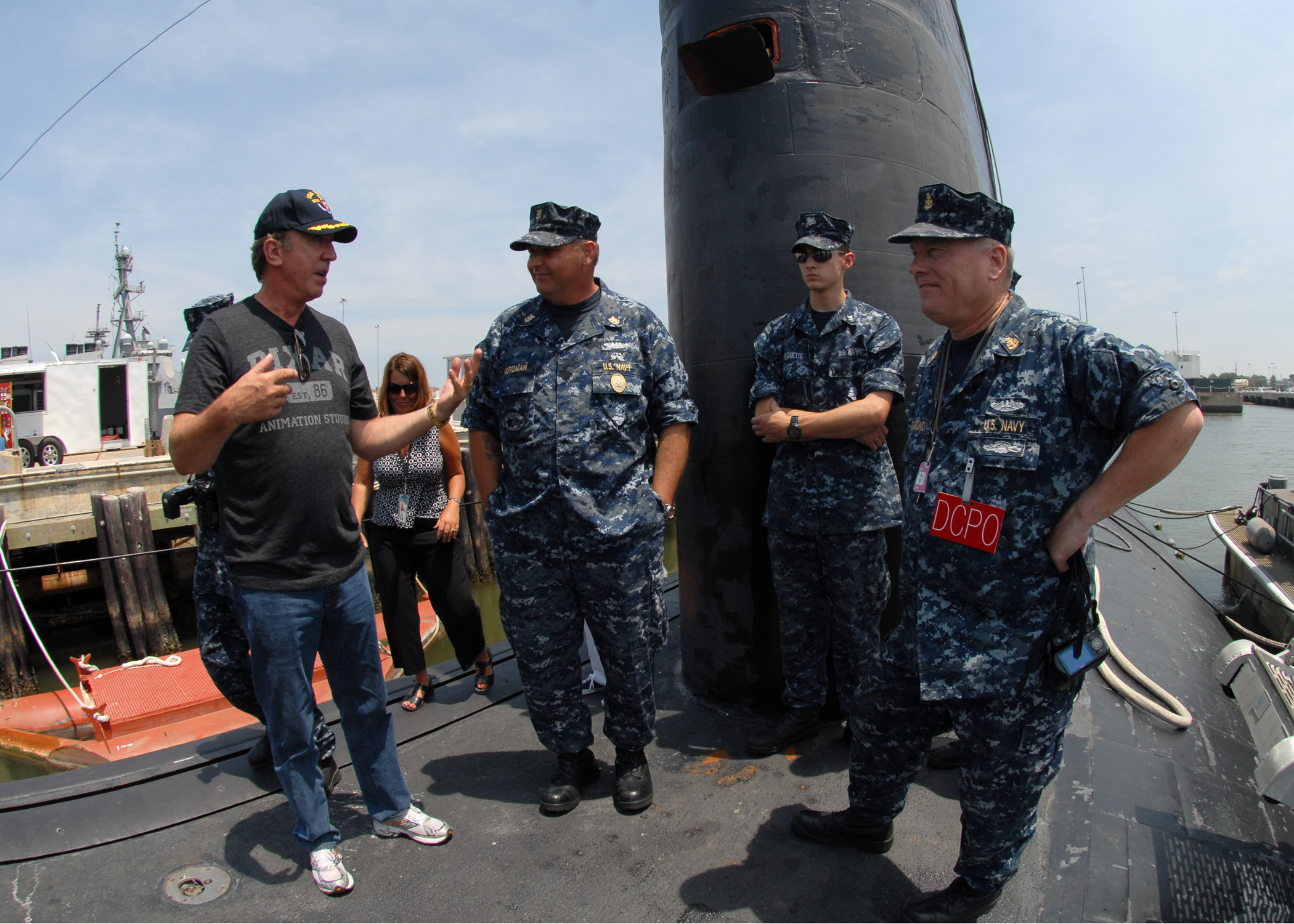
Allen (left) with members of the United States Navy, 2010

Allen was raised as an Episcopalian. He married Laura Deibel on April 7, 1984. Their daughter, Katherine, was born in December 1989. He and Deibel legally separated in 1999 and finalized their divorce in 2003. Allen married actress Jane Hajduk on October 7, 2006, in a small private ceremony in Grand Lake, Colorado. They had been dating for five years. Their daughter, Elizabeth, was born in March 2009.

=== Legal issues ===
On October 2, 1978, Allen was arrested at the Kalamazoo/Battle Creek International Airport for possession of over 650 grams (1.43 lb) of cocaine. He subsequently pleaded guilty to felony drug trafficking charges and provided the names of other dealers in exchange for a sentence of three to seven years rather than possible life imprisonment. He was paroled on June 12, 1981, after serving two years and four months in the Federal Correctional Institution in Sandstone, Minnesota.

In 1997, Allen was arrested for DUI in Birmingham, Michigan. At the time, his blood alcohol content was 0.15%, nearly double the legal limit in Michigan. He was sentenced to one-year probation and entered a rehabilitation clinic for alcohol abuse in 1998 as part of his court obligation.

=== Political views ===
Allen is a supporter of the Republican Party, describing himself as "fiscally conservative and emotionally liberal". He has referred to himself both on Last Man Standing and in real life as libertarian. In 2021, he criticized President Donald Trump and those taking part in the 2021 United States Capitol attack, calling the incident "horrible, embarrassing, and shameful" and opining that the rioters must have had inside help. He also said the riot had caused people to be embarrassed to be known as conservative.

Allen is also involved in philanthropic efforts to help reduce homelessness.

=== Car interests ===
Allen is a car enthusiast and competed in endurance racing for Saleen in a co-owned car in the 1990s, including the 24 Hours of Daytona. He also owns a car collection, which he houses in a former paint shop in Southern California. As of 2022, the collection includes a 1956 Ford F-100 custom made by McLaren, a 1965 Shelby Cobra, and a 1966 Ferrari 330 GTC.

== Filmography ==
=== Film ===
Year	Title	Role	Notes	Ref(s)
1988	Tropical Snow	Baggage Handler		
1988	Comedy's Dirtiest Dozen	Himself		
1994	The Santa Clause	Scott Calvin / Santa Claus		
1995	Toy Story	Buzz Lightyear	Voice role	
1997	Meet Wally Sparks	Himself	Cameo	
1997	Jungle 2 Jungle	Michael Cromwell		
1997	For Richer or Poorer	Brad Sexton		
1999	Toy Story 2	Buzz Lightyear / Ultra Buzz Lightyear	Voice role	
1999	Galaxy Quest	Jason Nesmith		
2000	Buzz Lightyear of Star Command: The Adventure Begins	Buzz Lightyear	Voice role; direct-to-video	
2001	Who Is Cletis Tout?	Critical Jim		
2001	Joe Somebody	Joe Scheffer		
2002	Big Trouble	Eliot Arnold		
2002	The Santa Clause 2	Santa Claus / Scott Calvin / Toy Santa		
2004	Christmas with the Kranks	Luther Krank		
2006	The Shaggy Dog	Dave Douglas	Producer	
2006	Cars	Buzz Lightyear Car	Voice cameo	
2006	Zoom	Jack Shepard / Capt. Zoom		
2006	The Santa Clause 3: The Escape Clause	Santa Claus / Scott Calvin		
2007	Wild Hogs	Doug Madsen		
2008	Redbelt	Chet Frank		
2009	The Six Wives of Henry Lefay	Henry Lefay	Also executive producer	
2010	Crazy on the Outside	Tommy Zelda	Also director	
2010	Toy Story 3	Buzz Lightyear	Voice role	
2011	Toy Story Toons: Hawaiian Vacation	Buzz Lightyear	Voice role; short film	
2011	Toy Story Toons: Small Fry	Buzz Lightyear	Voice role; short film	
2012	Toy Story Toons: Partysaurus Rex	Buzz Lightyear	Voice role; short film	
2012	Chimpanzee	Narrator	Documentary	
2012	The Penguin King	Narrator	American version	
2013	3 Geezers!	Tim		
2013	Adventures of the Penguin King	Narrator		
2017	El Camino Christmas	Larry Michael Roth		
2018	Ralph Breaks the Internet	Buzz Lightyear	Voice cameo, archive audio	
2019	Toy Story 4	Buzz Lightyear	Voice role	
2019	No Safe Spaces	Himself	Documentary	
2026	Toy Story 5	Buzz Lightyear / Hi-Tech Edition Buzz Lightyears	Voice role	

=== Television ===
Year	Title	Role	Notes	Ref(s)
1990	Tim Allen: Men Are Pigs	Himself	Stand-up special	
1991	Tim Allen Rewires America	Himself	Stand-up special	
1991–1999	Home Improvement	Tim Taylor	Lead role; also executive producer (seasons 6–8)	
1996	68th Academy Awards	Buzz Lightyear	Voice role	
1996	The Drew Carey Show	Himself	Episode: "The Front"; uncredited	
1997	Soul Man	Tim Taylor	Episode: "Communion Wine and Convicts"	
1998	The Larry Sanders Show	Himself	Episode: "Flip"	
1998	Spin City	Rags	Voice role; episode: "The Kidney's All Right"	
2000	72nd Academy Awards	Buzz Lightyear	Voice role	
2004	The Adventures of Jimmy Neutron, Boy Genius	Meldar Prime	Voice role; episode: "Win, Lose and Kaboom"	
2011–2021	Last Man Standing	Mike Baxter / Tim Taylor	Main role; also executive producer	
2013	Toy Story of Terror!	Buzz Lightyear	Voice role; television special	
2014	Toy Story That Time Forgot	Buzz Lightyear	Voice role; television special	
2015	Cristela	Mike Baxter	Episode: "Last Goose Standing"	
2016	88th Academy Awards	Buzz Lightyear	Voice role; television special	
2020	Reno 911!	Space Force Commander	Episode: "Space Force"	
2021	Assembly Required	Himself / Host	Main role; also creator and executive producer	
2022	More Power	Himself / Host	Main role; also creator and executive producer	
2022–2023	The Santa Clauses	Scott Calvin / Santa Claus	Main role; also executive producer	
2025–present	Shifting Gears	Matt Parker	Main role; also executive producer	

=== Video games ===
Year	Title	Voice role	Ref(s)
1994	Home Improvement: Power Tool Pursuit	Tim Taylor	
1999	Toy Story 2: Buzz Lightyear to the Rescue	Buzz Lightyear	Archived recordings
2001	Toy Story Racer	Buzz Lightyear	Archived recordings
2009	Toy Story Mania!	Buzz Lightyear	
2010	Scene It? Disney Magical Moments	Buzz Lightyear	
2010	Toy Story 3	Buzz Lightyear	DS, PS2, and PSP versions only
2016	Disney Magic Kingdoms	Buzz Lightyear	
2022	Disney Dreamlight Valley	Buzz Lightyear	
2023	Disney Speedstorm	Buzz Lightyear	
2024	Brawl Stars	Buzz Lightyear	Archived recordings

== Awards and honors ==
Awards and nominations

Year	Association	Category	Work	Result	Ref(s)
1992	People's Choice Awards	Favorite Male Performer in a New TV Series	Home Improvement	Won	
1993	Primetime Emmy Awards	Outstanding Lead Actor in a Comedy Series	Home Improvement	Nominated	
1993/1994; 1996/1997	Golden Globe Awards	Best Actor – Television Series Musical or Comedy	Home Improvement	Nominated	
1995	Golden Globe Awards	Best Actor – Television Series Musical or Comedy	Home Improvement	Won	
1993–1999	People's Choice Awards	Favorite Male TV Performer	Home Improvement	Won	
1994–1997	Kids' Choice Awards	Favorite Male TV Actor	Home Improvement	Won	
1998/1999	Kids' Choice Awards	Favorite Male TV Actor	Home Improvement	Nominated	
1995	People's Choice Awards	Favorite Comedy Motion Picture Actor	The Santa Clause	Won	
1995	MTV Movie Awards	Best Breakthrough Performance	The Santa Clause	Nominated	
1995	MTV Movie Awards	Best Comedic Performance	The Santa Clause	Nominated	
1996	Kids' Choice Awards	Hall of Fame induction	—N/a	Honored	
1997	Golden Satellite Awards	Best Actor in a Television Series – Comedy or Musical	Home Improvement	Nominated	
1999	TV Guide Awards	Favorite Actor in a Comedy	Home Improvement	Won	
2000	Annie Awards	Outstanding Voice Acting in a Feature Production	Toy Story 2	Won	
2009	TV Land Awards	Fan Favorite (given to the cast)	Home Improvement	Won	
2011	Kids' Choice Awards	Favorite Voice from an Animated Movie	Toy Story 3	Nominated	
2012	Kids' Choice Awards	Favorite TV Actor	Last Man Standing	Nominated	
2012	TV Guide Awards	Favorite Comeback	Last Man Standing	Won	
2017	People's Choice Awards	Favorite Comedic TV Actor	Last Man Standing	Nominated	
2023	Children's and Family Emmy Awards	Outstanding Lead Performance	The Santa Clauses	Nominated	
2026	Kids' Choice Awards	Favorite Male Animated Voice from a Movie	Toy Story 5	Nominated	
2026	Kids' Choice Awards	Favorite On-Screen Duo/Trio (with Tom Hanks and Joan Cusack)	Toy Story 5	Nominated	

Other honors

- 1999: Named a Disney Legend for his work on the Toy Story, The Santa Clause, and Home Improvement franchises
- 2004: Received a motion pictures star on the Hollywood Walk of Fame at 6834 Hollywood Boulevard for his contributions to the film industry
- 2017: Inducted into the Diecast Hall of Fame

Honorary scholastic degrees

Year	Degree	School	Location	Notes	Ref(s)
1998	Doctor of Fine Arts (DFA)	Western Michigan University	Michigan	Gave commencement address	
2021	Doctor of Fine Arts (DFA)	Hillsdale College	Michigan	Gave commencement address	

== Bibliography ==
- Don't Stand Too Close to a Naked Man (1994) – ISBN 0-7868-6134-7
- I'm Not Really Here (1996) – ISBN 0-7868-6257-2
