= Kingdom of Plants =

- Series title card from Sky Atlantic HD broadcast
- Genre: Nature documentary
- Written by: David Attenborough
- Directed by: Martin Williams
- Presented by: David Attenborough
- Country of origin: United Kingdom
- Original language: English
- No. of seasons: 1
- No. of episodes: 3

Production
- Executive producer: Anthony Geffen
- Production locations: Kew, England
- Cinematography: Tim Cragg, Tim Shepherd, Robert Hollingworth
- Running time: 50 minutes
- Production company: Atlantic Productions

Original release
- Network: Sky 3D, Sky Atlantic, Sky1
- Release: 26 May – 9 June 2012

Kingdom of Plants (originally known as Kingdom of Plants 3D) is a natural history documentary series written and presented by David Attenborough, which explores the world of plants. It was filmed over the course of a year at the UK's Royal Botanical Gardens, Kew.

The series premiered on 26 May 2012 on the Sky 3D network in the UK, with a 2D simulcast on Sky Atlantic HD.

Each of the three episodes explores a different aspect of plant life. "Life in the Wet Zone" explains how plants first colonised wet and humid environments, "Solving the Secrets" explores plant reproductive techniques and "Survival" shows how plants continually adapt to their environments. The series also goes behind the scenes of Kew's Millennium Seed Bank Project.

The series makes use of multiple camera formats and employs live action, time-lapse, high-speed, infrared, macro and micro photography to bring its subjects to life. Some of these techniques were pioneered in 3D for this series.

Kingdom of Plants is Attenborough's first 3D television series, and follows his two earlier films in the format; Flying Monsters 3D (2010) and The Penguin King 3D (2011). The same production team went on to produce Galapagos 3D, broadcast in 2013.

A companion iPad app to the series was released on 23 May 2012, using video and imagery from the series to provide a virtual tour of the Royal Botanic Gardens, Kew. Of the app, Attenborough commented "You can swipe your finger across the tablet to make a plant flower and, not only that, put it back again; it’s quite fun."

== Episodes ==
| No. | Title | Original air date (UK) |
|---|---|---|
| 1 | "Life in the Wet Zone" | 26 May 2012 |
| 2 | "Solving the Secrets" | 2 June 2012 |
| 3 | "Survival" | 9 June 2012 |
