= Aquarius (British TV series) =

British ITV arts series (1970–1977)

Aquarius (1970–1977) is a British arts television series, produced by London Weekend Television for ITV. After the demise of Aquarius, The South Bank Show (a similar arts programme) took its place in 1978, initially also in a magazine format, as ITV wanted a more accessible arts series.

Presented by Humphrey Burton, Peter Hall and Russell Harty amongst others, it had a magazine-style approach, with several features each week. Occasionally, single films were presented. These included a programme about Alfred Hitchcock, in London to shoot Frenzy, which was screened in 1972, with the film director being interviewed by Burton, while surrealist artist Salvador Dalí, accompanied by Harty, was the subject of an hour-long documentary broadcast the following year.

Other programmes included the musical Hair (the series utilised the song "Aquarius" from the musical as its theme), a play about the aviator Amy Johnson and the life and works of composer Erik Satie. Elton John was profiled as a rising UK star in 1971. The segment featured footage of John playing "Tiny Dancer" before the song was recorded.
