= Ian Squires =

British television producer

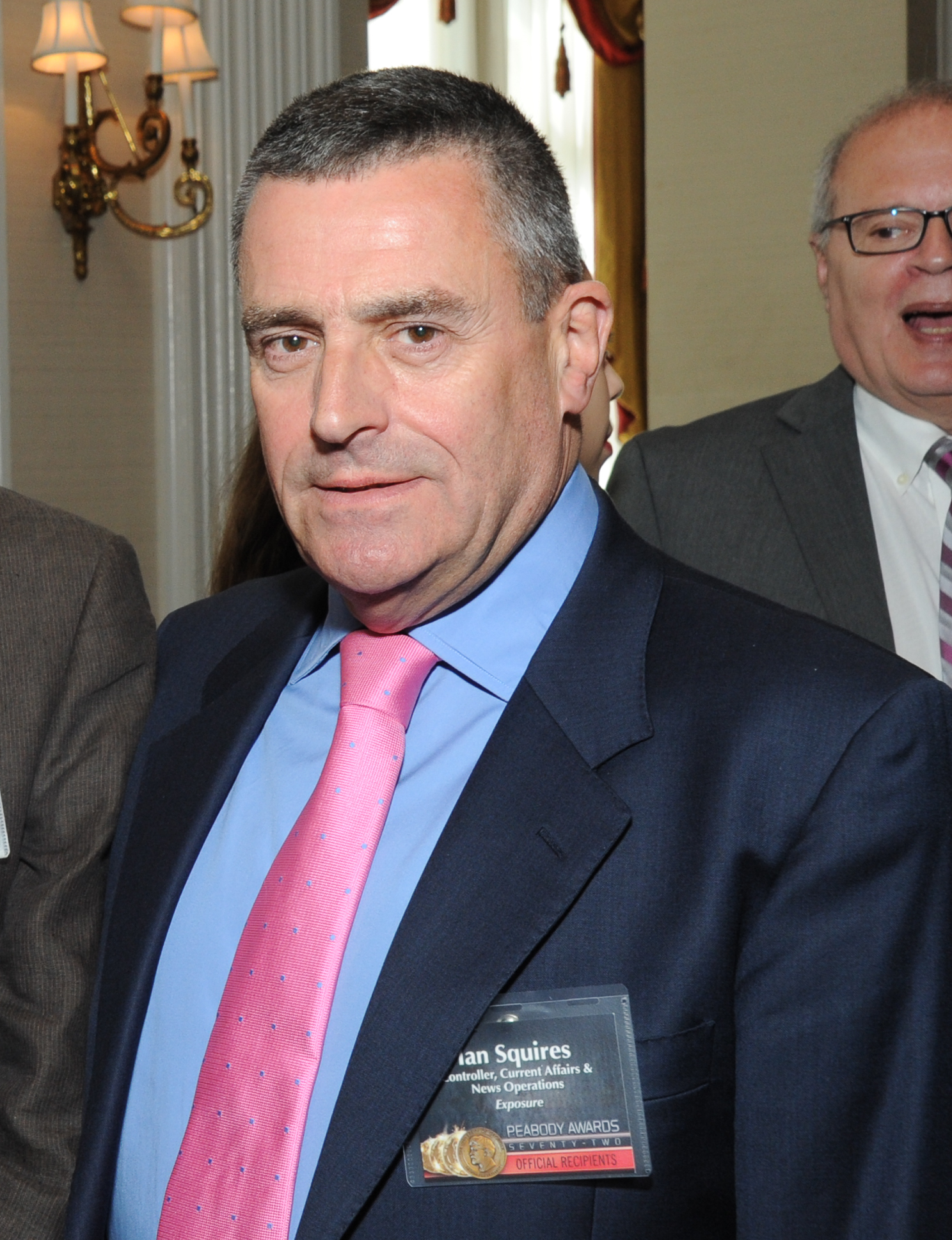
Ian Squires in 2013

Charles Ian Squires (born 22 April 1951) is a British television producer, and the former Head of ITV Regions.

== Early life ==
He comes from Sunderland, where he was born. He attended Bede Grammar School for Boys. From 1969 to 1972 he completed a BA in English at UCL.

== Career ==
From 1973 to 1975 he worked as a journalist in parliament.

=== BBC ===
From 1975 to 1986 he worked at the BBC in current affairs and on Omnibus. From 1986 to 1988 he was a freelance television producer. In 1988 he became Head of Network Television for BBC North West.

=== Central Broadcasting ===
In 1994 he moved to Carlton Studios, Nottingham (Lenton Lane Studios), becoming the managing director of Central Broadcasting, later Carlton Broadcasting from 1999. In early September 1999, the Central Television name disappeared. On 27 February 2004 he told staff at the Lenton Lane Studios in Nottingham, that the site was closing down, with the loss of around 200 jobs. Central employed around 700 people. Central News East would be moved to Birmingham.

=== ITV ===
In 2004 he became managing director of ITV Central. In 2009 he became Controller of ITV Regions.

== Personal life ==
He married Vanessa Sweet in October 1993 in Truro. They have two daughters (born July 1996 and August 1999). He lives at Bisbrooke in Rutland. He has previously lived in Burrough on the Hill.

Media offices
| Preceded by | Controller, ITV Regions and Current Affairs; April 2009 - March 2011 | Succeeded by |
| Preceded by | Managing Director of ITV Central; November 1996 - June 2008 | Succeeded by |
| Preceded by | Managing Director of Carlton Studios, Nottingham; June 1994 - November 1996 | Succeeded by |
| Preceded by | Head of Network TV, BBC North West; 1988 - 1990 | Succeeded by |
