= James Fox (art historian) =

British art historian

- Born: February 1982 (age 44); London, England
- Education: Emmanuel College, Cambridge
- Occupations: Art historian, broadcaster
- Writing career
- Notable awards: Herchel Smith Scholarship

James Fox (born February 1982) is a British art historian and broadcaster. Fox specialises in 20th-century art.

Fox is best known for presenting documentaries on the history of art for BBC Four. He is a frequent media commentator on 20th-century and contemporary art.

== Education and career ==
Fox received a first class degree in History of Art from Emmanuel College, Cambridge. He then undertook an MPhil on British modernism, before spending a year as a Herchel Smith scholar at Harvard University.

Returning to the University of Cambridge in 2006, Fox embarked on a PhD on history of art entitled Business Unusual: Art in Britain During the First World War, 1914–18, funded by the AHRC.

In 2009 he was appointed as a research fellow at Churchill College, Cambridge. In 2010, he spent Michaelmas term as a visiting scholar to Yale Center for British Art at Yale University. He subsequently joined Gonville and Caius College as a research fellow in 2011 before becoming serving as director of studies in history of art at Emmanuel College 2021-2026.

For four years, while still a student at Cambridge, Fox worked with the British art critic, Waldemar Januszczak, at his production company ZCZ films. In 2008 Fox and Januszczak co-curated the Statuephilia exhibition at the British Museum; this included work by Damien Hirst, Antony Gormley and Marc Quinn.

In 2014 Fox was chosen as one of Apollo Magazine's "40 Under 40" – the "most talented and inspirational young people who are driving forward the art world today".

In 2015, Fox's academic monograph about the art of the First World War was published. Fox was also commissioned by Allen Lane to write two major non-fiction books, the first of which will be a cultural history of colour entitled: The Meaning of Colour. The second monograph will be entitled: British art in the Twentieth Century.

Fox has written for The Times, The Telegraph and The Independent, and has appeared on Newsnight, The Review Show, and BBC Radio 4's Something Understood.

== Filmography ==
=== Television ===
Fox presents documentaries on art and culture for the BBC. In 2010, he presented the ninety-minute film The Art of Cornwall. A three-part series entitled British Masters was broadcast on BBC Four in July 2011. The series adopted a highly provocative approach: The Times called the series "superb television... passionate, accessible and authoritative"; and The Observer called him "absurdly lucid", and the Financial Times called it "excellent and engaging".

In April 2012, Fox's 2011 series British Masters was nominated for a BAFTA for Best Specialist Factual programme.

In August 2012, BBC Four broadcast his new series, A History of Art in Three Colours, an exploration of art history with reference to the colours white, gold and blue. In reviews of the series, Fox was singled out for praise. The Times wrote that he belonged "in the Premier League of television presenters. He knows and loves his subject, so he doesn't need to wave his arms around and resort to hyperbole. He is clear, unpretentious, insightful and willing to flout fashion, and he is a superb storyteller".

In 2013, the Royal Television Society nominated Fox for its best presenter of the year award.

In 2014, Fox presented a three-part programme titled A Very British Renaissance on BBC 2, tracing a renaissance in British culture commencing in the early 1500s.

In August and September 2014, Fox presented a three-part series for BBC 4 called Bright Lights Brilliant Minds: a Tale of Three Cities, examining the culture and politics of Vienna in 1908, Paris in 1928 and New York in 1951.

In May 2016, he presented Forest, Field & Sky: Art Out of Nature on BBC 4, which explored contemporary land art and work incorporating the natural world. In September of the same year, he presented Who's Afraid of Conceptual Art? on BBC Four.

In December 2016 CNN released the first episode of their animated series Color Scope, written and narrated by Fox. Each 90 second episode focuses on one colour and follows a fact-filled narrative. The first episode is "Blue" and was released on 18 December 2016.

Year	Title	Channel	Notes
2021	Nature and Us: A History through Art	BBC Four	Three part series. October 2021
2020	Museums in Quarantine, Part Three	BBC Four	Four part series. April 2020
2020	Age of the Image	BBC Four	Four part series. March 2020
2018	Oceans Apart: Art and the Pacific	BBC Four	Three part series. September 2018
2017	The Art of Japanese Life	BBC Four	Three part series. June 2017
2016	Colorscope	CNN	Ongoing series, December 2016
2016	Who's Afraid of Conceptual Art?	BBC Four	September 2016
2016	Forest, Field & Sky	BBC Four	May 2016
2014	Bright Lights, Brilliant Minds	BBC Four	Three part series. August 2014
2014	A Very British Renaissance	BBC Two	Three part series. March 2014
2012	A History of Art in Three Colours	BBC Four	Three part series. May 2013
2011	British Masters	BBC Four	Three part series. July 2011
2010	The Art of Cornwall	BBC Four	December 2010

== Bibliography ==
- British Art and the First World War, 1914–1924 (2015) ISBN 9781107105874
- The Art of Jeffrey Rubinoff (2016) ISBN 9781771621298
- The World According To Colour: A Cultural History (2021) ISBN 9781846148248
- Craftland (2025) ISBN 9781847927866
