= Fear City: New York vs the Mafia =

2020 documentary television miniseries

- Genre: Documentary; True crime
- Directed by: Sam Hobkinson
- Music by: Paul Moessl
- Opening theme: "Hard Times" by Baby Huey & the Babysitters
- Country of origin: United States
- Original language: English
- No. of seasons: 1
- No. of episodes: 3

Production
- Executive producers: Dimitri Doganis; Bart Layton; Adam Hawkins; Jon Liebman
- Producer: Bernadette Higgins
- Cinematography: Tim Cragg
- Editors: Julian Hart; Tom Parsons
- Running time: 44–62 minutes
- Production companies: Raw Television; Brillstein Entertainment Partners

Original release
- Network: Netflix
- Release: July 22, 2020

Fear City: New York vs The Mafia is an American true crime docuseries about New York City's Five Families: the Gambino, Colombo, Bonanno, Lucchese, and Genovese crime organizations.

== Premise ==
The series is told from the point of view of the Federal Bureau of Investigation, detailing how the implementation of wiretaps were able to bring down the mob in the Mafia Commission Trial. The series, released on Netflix on July 22, 2020, also featured appearances from Donald Trump (in archival footage), Rudy Giuliani, Michael Franzese and John Alite.

== Episodes ==
No.	Title	Directed by	Original release date
1	"Mob Rule"	Sam Hobkinson	July 22, 2020
As New York runs amok, the mob operates with impunity, until a little-known law and some innovative surveillance tactics give federal agents a leg up.
2	"The Godfather Tapes"	Sam Hobkinson	July 22, 2020
As the FBI takes daring steps to wiretap the heads of the five families, the new US Attorney for the Southern District of New York joins the fight.
3	"Judgment Day"	Sam Hobkinson	July 22, 2020
In order to prove a conspiracy among the mafia bosses, the FBI tries to tie "The Commission" to a high-profile gangland murder.

== Release ==
Fear City: New York vs The Mafia was released on July 22, 2020, on Netflix.

== Reception ==
On review aggregator Rotten Tomatoes, the series holds an approval rating of 71% based on 17 reviews, with an average rating of 7.25/10. The website's critics consensus reads: "Compelling interviews and a slick style help Fear City entertain, but those already familiar with the case will find few new insights." On Metacritic, it has a weighted average score of 61 out of 100, based on 10 critics, indicating "generally favorable reviews".

Reviewing the series for The Hollywood Reporter, Daniel Fienberg said it featured "by-the-numbers storytelling with a law enforcement perspective" and wrote: "I wish there were more consistency to when and how the reenactment device is used, but there are general potholes of sloppiness throughout Fear City." John Anderson of The Wall Street Journal said the series "offers a skewed history of the investigations into organized crime in 1970s-80s New York".
