= Nicholas Rossiter =

English television producer (1961–2004)

Nicholas Jeremy Rossiter (17 July 1961, Litton, Somerset – 23 July 2004, London) was an English television producer. He was arts producer for the BBC from 1987 to 2004.

== Education ==
Rossiter was educated at Downside School, a Catholic boarding independent school in the village of Stratton-on-the-Fosse (near the market town of Shepton Mallet) in Somerset, in South West England, followed by Greyfriars at the University of Oxford, where he read Modern History.

== Family ==
Rossiter married Bea Ballard in 1995; they had two daughters.

== Death ==
Rossiter died of heart failure in London on 23 July 2004, aged 43.
