= Human Planet =

British television documentary series

- Narrated by: John Hurt
- Composer: Nitin Sawhney
- Country of origin: United Kingdom
- Original language: English
- No. of episodes: 8

Production
- Executive producers: Brian Leith, Dale Templar
- Producers: Nicolas Brown, Mark Flowers, Tom-Hugh Jones, Tuppence Stone
- Cinematography: Pete Haynes, Matt Norman, Toby Strong, Robin Cox, Timothy Allen
- Running time: 60 minutes
- Production company: BBC Natural History Unit

Original release
- Network: BBC One; BBC HD
- Release: 13 January – 3 March 2011

Human Planet is an 8-part British television documentary series. It was produced as a co-production between the BBC Natural History Unit, BBC Worldwide, BBC Cymru Wales, Discovery Channel and France Télévisions. The documentary describes the human species and its relationship with the natural world by showing the remarkable ways humans have adapted to life in every environment on Earth. The show drew attention for alleged fakery and the BBC eventually acknowledged that a number of scenes were inaccurately depicted or misleading and withdrew the series from distribution.

Human Planet was originally screened in the UK on BBC One each Thursday at 8pm over eight weeks, starting from 13 January 2011. Domestic repeats have been seen on Eden, with all 8 episodes aired over one week in April 2012. BBC Worldwide has since announced they have sold the broadcast rights to 22 international markets.

== Production ==
Announced in 2007, the production teams based at the BBC Natural History Unit in Bristol and BBC Wales spent three years shooting over 70 stories in some of the most remote locations on Earth spanning about 40 countries. Each episode of the series focuses on a different human-inhabited environment, including deserts, jungles, the Arctic, grasslands, rivers, mountains, oceans, and the urban landscape.

For the first time on a BBC landmark series, the production had a dedicated stills photographer, Timothy Allen, who documented the project photographically for the books and multimedia that accompany the series.

== Broadcast ==
Country/Region	Channel	Narrator
Australia	ABC1	
New Zealand	Prime	
United Kingdom	BBC One; Eden	John Hurt
United States	Discovery Channel; Discovery en Español	Mike Rowe (English); Gael Garcia Bernal (Spanish)

== Episodes ==
Only one creature has carved a life for itself in every habitat on Earth. That creature is us. All over the world we still use our ingenuity to survive in the wild places far from the city lights - face to face with raw nature. This is the Human Planet.

— John Hurt's opening narration

No.	Title	Original release date
1	"Oceans – Into the Blue"	13 January 2011
The beginning of the episode contrasts the richness and dangers of the oceans with the adaptability and endeavour of the people attracted to it, and their reliance on oceanic resources with its exploitation. Topics include: goose barnacle collection in coastal Galicia in northern Spain; sperm whale hunting off the Indonesian archipelago island of Lembata; bottlenose dolphin assisted fishing at Laguna in Brazil; the spiritual origins and modern aspects of surfing in Hawaii; shark calling in Papua New Guinea; the dangers of compressor diving around Palawan in the Philippines; and the transient stateless houseboat Bajau people living in the Coral Sea near Borneo. The "Behind the Lens" end-section looks at the dangers of compressor diving in the Philippines.
2	"Deserts – Life in the Furnace"	20 January 2011
The second instalment deals with the lifestyles and adaptations of people existing in the unforgiving arid regions of the Earth. Topics include: cattle herders racing African elephants to Lake Banzena for scarce water resources in Mali; sacred Antogo fishing by the Dogon people in a drought shrunken Mali lake; Tubu women in Niger navigating their way across the Sahara with a camel caravan on the way to market; the struggle between wolves and camel and sheep herders in the wintry Gobi Desert; moisture farming for agriculture in the Atacama Desert; mining and networking underground aqueducts in rural Algeria; details of extravagant water usage in Las Vegas; and the annual Guérewol fertility dance of the Wodaabe Fula people in Niger. The "Behind the Lens" end-section shows the crew following Tubu women in Niger, and the challenges of filming them with a cinebulle.
3	"Arctic – Life in the Deep Freeze"	27 January 2011
The third episode looks at the hunting season of some of the 4 million people eking out a living within the hostile Arctic Circle. Topics include: Inuit hunting Greenland sharks as food for their huskies; using a neap tide to gather mussels under sea ice in North-eastern Canada; hunting narwhals (prized as a source of Vitamin C) using traditional methods in Greenland; in July, using nets to harvest auks in Siorapaluk, Greenland; preparing kiviak, made by fermenting auks in a seal skin; in September, herding and driving of reindeer by Sami people on Arnøya in Norway; and in October, removing migrating polar bears in Churchill, Manitoba Canada. The "Behind the Lens" end-section reveals the difficulties of locating narwhals on the unpredictable ice-floes.
4	"Jungles – People of the Trees"	3 February 2011
This episode examines how people survive in tropical forests, where there is often less protein available than in the deserts. Topics include: blowgun hunting canopy monkeys with the Matis in Brazil; hunting goliath tarantula with the Piaroa people in Venezuela; breastfeeding orphaned monkey pets by the Awá Guajá people of the eastern Amazon; hunting birds-of-paradise for plumage used to crown costumes at the Mount Hagen sing-sing in Papua New Guinea; gathering honeycomb with the Bayaka in the Congo jungle; logging timber using Asian elephants in Assam, India; gathering evidence of uncontacted peoples in Brazil; and building a tree house 35 metres high with the Korowai in West Papua, Indonesia. This was later revealed to have been faked. The "Behind the Lens" end-section follows the camera team's attempts to overcome the challenges of filming in the trees.
5	"Mountains – Life in Thin Air"	10 February 2011
This show highlights the attraction of mountains for people, such as security or rare resource exploitation. Topics include: ethnic Kazakhs hunting with golden eagles in the Altai Mountains of Mongolia; cliff-farmers battling gelada monkeys in the Semien Mountains of Ethiopia; mining rock sulphur in the active Ijen crater on the Indonesian island of Java; Yangoru-boiken tribe members hunting giant bats in the New Guinea Highlands; avalanche control using dynamite on mountains near Grindelwald in the Swiss Alps; cataracts due to high-UV rates, and free eye surgery provided by Dr. Sanduk Ruit in remote areas of the Himalayas, Nepal; and a Tibetan sky burial using vultures high in the rural mountainside. The "Behind the Lens" end-section focuses on the challenges of finding prey for the golden eagles.
6	"Grasslands – Roots of Power"	17 February 2011
The sixth instalment shows humanity's reliance on grass species and the animals they support. Topics include: Dorobo people using guile to steal wildebeest meat from a lion pride in Kenya; bushmen tracking and ambushing kudu in the Kalahari; netting water snakes for food and for market in Cambodia's flooded Tonlé Sap grasslands; Maasai boys and a honeyguide working collaboratively to locate and then harvest African bee honey; protecting rice crops in Tanzania from massive swarms of quelea; mustering horses on the Mongolian steppe in order to make airag (a traditional fermented horse-milk yoghurt); traditional Donga stick-fights of Ethiopia's Suri tribesmen; mustering beef cattle by helicopter in the northern Australian outback. The "Behind the Lens" end-section reveals the difficulties and real-life dangers of stealing from a lion pride.
7	"Rivers – Friend and Foe"	24 February 2011
This episode documents people's attraction to the rich yet unpredictable river systems around the world. Topics include: fishermen traversing the Mekong's cataracts in Si Phan Don, Laos, during the monsoon floods; a 100 kilometre 6-day winter Chadar trek to school along the frozen Zanskar River in Ladakh, India; flood control through ice-breaking with dynamite along the Rideau River in Ottawa; moving houses threatened by a collapsing riverbank along the Ganges in Bangladesh; preparing for the annual flood on Brazil's Rio Negro by harvesting baby turtles; fishing in the rapids on the edge of Victoria Falls; Samburu camel herders tracking elephants to locate water below the dry Milgis riverbed in northern Kenya; plastering the mud-walled mosque of Djenné; and the natural living bridges of Meghalaya in northern India. The "Behind the Lens" end-section focuses on the challenging conditions of the Mekong's Khone Falls.
8	"Cities – Surviving the Urban Jungle"	3 March 2011
The final episode concludes the series with an exploration of humans attempts to control urban nature. Topics include: using falconry in Dubai to control the feral pigeon population; local police on Segway scooters controlling wild elk stags in Estes Park, Colorado; the dilemma of selling food in a rhesus macaque-infested market in Jaipur; catching rats and controlling other pests in New York City; dealing with a bedbug infestation in London with a sniffer dog; attracting feral pigeons in Fes in order to harvest droppings for leather tanning; living with and profiting from free-tailed bats who roost on a bridge in Austin, Texas; Bishnois rescuing and caring for orphaned fawns in Rajasthan; the availability of non-seasonal or non-local foods all over the world; scavenging on a landfill in Mombasa, Kenya; building the green city of Masdar in Abu Dhabi; and urban apiary in New York City. The "Behind the Lens" end-section explores a range of filming experiences from all habitats.

== Reception ==
Human Planet was nominated for 7 BAFTA Television Craft awards, the most for any programme in 2011, and it won 2 of them, both for the Arctic episode, where Jason Savage won the factual editing prize, and Will Edwards, Doug Allan and Matt Norman won the photography (cinematography) prize.

== Controversy and inaccuracies ==
The BBC has issued multiple statements about inaccuracies within the series. A first statement admitted that "the portrayal of the [Korowai] tribe moving into the treehouse as a real home is not accurate." In fact, the tribe built the treehouse on commission for the programme. A second statement stated that a scene depicting "a Lamaleran whale hunter named Benjamin Blikololong shown supposedly harpooning a whale" is also inaccurate.

The BBC also later disclosed that a scene from the "Deserts" episode, which supposedly showed a wild wolf being shot at by Mongolian herders, actually showed a semi-domesticated wolf running to its handler, who was kept out of frame. The wolf was not shot at. Another scene depicting Venezuelan children hunting tarantulas, while implied to be taking place in the jungle, actually was shot in a television studio.

As a result, the BBC withdrew Human Planet from distribution pending a full editorial review.

== Merchandise ==
The Region 2 DVD and Blu-ray three-disc set was released on 21 February 2011.

The Region 1 DVD and Blu-ray three-disc set was released on 26 April 2011.

The Region 4 DVD and Blu-ray three-disc set was released on 5 May 2011.

The accompanying hardcover book was released on 20 January 2011: Templar, Dale (2011). Human Planet. BBC Books. ISBN 978-1-84607-956-6.
