= British Masters (TV series) =

British television series

The Mud Bath (1914) by David Bomberg, one of the paintings discussed in the series.

British Masters is a three-part BBC television series on 20th century British art, presented by Dr James Fox and first broadcast in July 2011 on BBC Four. The series covers the period from 1910 to 1975.

The first programme explored the lives and works of Mark Gertler, Lawrence Alma-Tadema, Walter Sickert, Wyndham Lewis, Lawrence Atkinson, David Bomberg, Richard Nevinson, Paul Nash and Stanley Spencer. The second programme explored the works of John Nash, Stanley Spencer, Alfred Munnings, William Coldstream, Paul Nash and John Piper. In the third programme, subtitled 'A New Jerusalem,' Fox explored British art in the aftermath of the 2nd World War, and examined the works of Lucian Freud, Graham Sutherland, Francis Bacon, Richard Hamilton, David Hockney and Keith Vaughan. In this final programme of the series Fox explored how the themes of evil, brutality, dehumanisation, consumerism and optimism can be seen in the works of these postwar artists. Fox contends in this programme that the death of Lucian Freud and the emergence of conceptual art have marginalised, eclipsed and brought to an end the tradition of British figurative painting.

In each case, the backgrounds, techniques, subjects and interests of each artist are analysed against a backdrop of the social and political events of their day, especially the two world wars, the decline of Edwardian values and traditions, the poverty and economic turmoil of the 1920s and 1930s and the relative sense of optimism following both wars. The programmes also reflect a personal and national search for security in enduring but elusive British values, beliefs and identity in what Fox depicts as a century of crisis and upheaval, in which much more had perhaps been lost than gained.

Fox's provocative approach seems to have divided the critics: The Times called the series "superb television;" and The Observer called it "absurdly lucid," but one critic criticised the series for its "grandiose, inflammatory statements," while Fisun Güner described Fox's revisionist case as "ludicrous."
