= Atlantic Productions =

British television production company

- Type: Private
- Industry: Production company
- Founded: 1992
- Founder: Anthony Geffen
- Headquarters: 4 Rowan Road, London, England
- Website: http://atlanticproductions.tv/

Atlantic Productions is a British production company based in London that produces television programmes for broadcasters in Europe and the United States.

== Overview ==
Founded in 1992, Atlantic Productions leads a group of companies which make television programmes, theatrical and IMAX films, apps, visual effects, "immersive virtual reality", and online interactive experiences. Their output includes history, science, natural history, current affairs, observational, music and arts and dramas.

Among others, the company has produced programs for the BBC, Channel 4, Five, PBS, Discovery Channel, National Geographic Channel, A&E Network, History, Science Channel, Animal Planet, Travel Channel, Discovery Health Channel, Investigation Discovery, La7, France 5 and NDR.

Atlantic Productions has won a number of awards, including two BAFTA awards for best specialist factual, 11 Emmy awards, two RTS awards and the best 3D award at Jackson Hole and Wildscreen. The company also won the "Best Interactive Media" award at Jackson Hole for the NHM Alive! App.

Productions include Galapagos (BBC), Inside the Commons (BBC), and David Attenborough's Great Barrier Reef. They also produced the BAFTA-winning David Attenborough's Great Barrier Reef Dive VR, David Attenborough's First Life VR and Space Descent VR with Tim Peake. In 2019, Atlantic Productions was producing a documentary film about a dive to the wreck of the RMS Titanic in August 2019. Specially adapted cameras were used to capture the wreck in 4K resolution for the first time, and dedicated photogrammetry passes were performed to create highly accurate and photoreal 3D models.
