= Flying Monsters 3D =

- Written by: David Attenborough
- Narrated by: David Attenborough
- Country of origin: United Kingdom

Production
- Producers: Anthony Geffen & Sias Wilson
- Production companies: National Geographic; Atlantic Productions; Sky 3D

Original release
- Release: 25 December 2010

Flying Monsters 3D is a natural history documentary about the pterosaurs. It was written and presented by David Attenborough and was produced by National Geographic and Atlantic Productions for Sky 3D. Originally broadcast on Christmas Day 2010, it was the first 3D documentary to be screened on British television and was released in theatres and IMAX cinemas the following year. Flying Monsters 3D went on to become the first 3D programme to win a BAFTA award, winning in the category for Best Specialist Factual in 2011.

== Featured animals ==
- Dimorphodon
- Darwinopterus
- Pteranodon
- Tapejara
- Quetzalcoatlus
