= Sky 3D =

British television channel

- Broadcast area: United Kingdom, Ireland

Programming
- Language(s): English
- Picture format: 1080i (3DTV)

Ownership
- Owner: Sky plc

History
- Launched: 3 April 2010 (commercial); 1 October 2010 (residential)
- Closed: 9 June 2015 (switched to on demand)
- Replaced by: Sky 2

Links
- Website: www.sky.com/3d (now inactive)

Sky 3D was a 3D television on-demand service and a former channel on the Sky platform, that launched on 3 April 2010 with the Manchester United vs Chelsea football match being broadcast to over a thousand pubs in the UK and Ireland in 3D.

== History ==
On 1 October 2010, Sky 3D became available to residential subscribers. The channel broadcast a mixture of movies, entertainment and sport for 16 hours a day from 09:00 to 01:00 UTC.

To promote its 3D channel, Sky broadcast a documentary programme titled Flying Monsters 3D presented by prominent naturalist and broadcaster David Attenborough on Christmas Day 2010. Sky has also agreed deals with Walt Disney Pictures, 20th Century Fox, Universal Pictures, Warner Bros., Paramount and DreamWorks to showcase all of the studios' new 3D films, including the 3D world premiere of Avatar. Sky also filmed a Bollywood dance routine at St Pancras railway station in 3D as part of a partnership between Sky Arts and the English National Ballet. Sky also worked with Nintendo to provide shortform content from Sky 3D to the Nintendo 3DS. In April 2011, Sky announced that Kylie Minogue's Aphrodite World Tour would be shown on Sky 3D in June 2011.

3D was also available for use by many broadcasters on the Sky platform, including A+E Networks, Discovery Communications, ESPN Inc. and MTV Networks to broadcast their own 3D programming. During the 2012 Summer Olympics, Sky 3D provided coverage from Eurosport, with the channel made available to all of Sky's HD pack subscribers for the duration of the games.

== Closure ==
On 24 April 2015, Sky announced that the channel will become solely on demand from June 2015. The dedicated Sky 3D channel closed on 9 June 2015 but Sky continues to provide 3D as part of their On Demand services. As of 15 August 2017 there are around 50 feature films available in 3D along with a selection of arts and documentary programmes.

== See also ==
- Sky+ HD
- Nintendo 3DS
