= Blue Planet III =

British nature documentary television series

- Genre: Nature documentary
- Directed by: Jo Haley; Yolly Bosiger; Natasha Fellows; Eva Spielvogel; Sarah Conner; Rosie Gloyns
- Narrated by: David Attenborough
- Theme music composer: Hans Zimmer and Thom Lukas
- Composers: Hans Zimmer; Thom Lukas; Laurentia Editha
- Country of origin: United Kingdom
- Original language: English
- No. of episodes: 6

Production
- Executive producer: Elizabeth White
- Producers: Lara Bickerton; James Brickell
- Running time: 60 minutes
- Production company: BBC Studios Natural History Unit

Original release
- Network: BBC One
- Release: 1 November 2026 – present

Related
- The Blue Planet; Blue Planet II; Blue Planet (franchise); Planet Earth (franchise)

Blue Planet III is a British nature documentary series co-produced by the BBC Natural History Unit, ZDF, France Télévisions, and Skai TV in partnership with The Open University. It started on BBC One, BBC iPlayer, and BBC America on 1 November 2026.

Blue Planet III is the third series to carry the Blue Planet name. The first, 2001's The Blue Planet, won multiple Emmy and BAFTA TV awards for its music and cinematography, while the second, 2017's Blue Planet II, was the most watched programme that year. Both explored the world's oceans, showing marine ecosystems and wildlife, with Blue Planet III scheduled to show the same.

The series was commissioned and first announced by the BBC in 2022. By February 2026, the series had been preordered by broadcasters in Australia (Nine), Brazil (Globo), Canada (Blue Ant Media, Radio-Canada), China (Shanghai Media Group's Dragon TV), Denmark (DR), New Zealand (TVNZ), and Spain (MovistarPlus+). That March, it was announced that BBC Studios would team up with Dorling Kindersley to release a tie-in book. In May 2026, it was confirmed that David Attenborough would return as narrator and a short video was released of him recording his voiceover. The announcement coincided with Attenborough's 100th birthday.

Blue Planet III will have six hour-long episodes, with filming taking four years. The first five episodes will each focus on a different underwater habitat, and are titled "Tropical Seas", "Open Ocean", "Seasonal Seas", "Polar Waters" and "The Deep". The final episode, "Future Seas", will explore themes of marine conservation.

== Filming ==
Principal photography began in September 2022, one month after it was officially announced, and ended in June 2026. Research was underway in late 2023. Filming occurred in the Falkland Islands and United States in 2024 and 2025. Filming also took place in Egypt’s Red Sea in August 2025. Photographer Dan Beecham confirmed his involvement between 2024 and 2026.

== Episodes ==
No.	Title	Produced by	Original release date	UK viewers (millions)
1	"Tropical Seas"	Yoland Bosiger	1 November 2026	TBD
At the northern tip of Australia, tawny nurse sharks cooperate to drive herring and silversides against the shore. In Shark Bay, a bottlenose dolphin uses sea sponges to block escape routes for fish hiding at bommie reef patches. In the Red Sea, a grouper recruits a Maori wrasse and moray eel to help capture reef fish. In Indonesia, a pair of harlequin shrimp hunt for starfish. A dying humpback whale becomes sustenance for sharks and other marine life. Green sea turtles at Fernando de Noronha evade tiger sharks while balancing their need for food and air. Herds of dugong feed at seagrass meadows, followed by hungry remoras. In the mangroves of Brazil, fiddler crabs court and fall prey to scarlet ibises. In the Coral Triangle, clownfish desperately try to save their sea anemone from bleaching in a heatwave.
2	"Open Ocean"	Natasha Fellows	1 November 2026	TBD
Off the coast of Central America, sea lions wait to feed at a bait ball of sardines and scad, swarmed by mahi-mahi, black skipjack tuna, pelicans, and frigatebirds. Off the coast of Morocco, a rough-toothed dolphin preys on pilot fish sheltering around a loggerhead sea turtle. Mola mola forage on by-the-wind sailors and seek out halfmoon fish to clean off their parasites. Smith's swimming crabs are swept into an atoll in the Seychelles, where they face predatory reef fish. On the Mexican coastline, hatchling green sea turtles need the help of conservationists to navigate through wayward mats of sargassum. A frigatebird at Isla Isabel turns to local fishermen after gulls prevent her from stealing fish from blue-footed boobies. An offshore seabream farm in the Atlantic attracts competitive loggerhead sea turtles. An adult blue whale evades a pod of orca who try to drive him into the rocky coast of Mexico.
3	"Seasonal Seas"	Joanna Haley	1 November 2026	TBD
On the Pacific coast of South America, winter storms batter sea lion colonies. Some sea lions venture far inland to hunt black-necked swans. At a bay in Patagonia, a female southern right whale assesses potential mates. Off the coast of Chile, droves of porcelain crabs coordinate to maximize their yield of plankton. At a kelp forest in Japan, a female eelpout competes for a mate and contends with predatory rockfish. Octopus oliveri crawl onto land to hunt crabs at tide pools, and one octopus risks suffocation to hunt blennies in more distant pools. In a vast picarel colony in the Mediterranean, a male attempts to defend his eggs from predators and other roaming picarels. A long-snouted seahorse in Portugal leaves his patch of seagrass in search of a mate, only to need help surviving on the human-degraded seabed. Near New York City, recovering schools of menhaden sustain bottlenose dolphins, sharks, and humpback whales.
4	"Polar Waters"	TBA	22 November 2026	TBD
5	"The Deep"	TBA	TBA	TBD
6	"Future Seas"	TBA	TBA	TBD
