= Planet Earth (franchise) =

BBC nature documentary franchise

- Original work: Planet Earth (2006)
- Owner: BBC
- Years: 2006-present

Print publications
- Books: Planet Earth: As You've Never Seen It Before (2006); Planet Earth: The Future (2006); Planet Earth: The Making of an Epic Series (2006); Planet Earth - The Future: What the Experts Say (2006); Planet Earth: The Photographs (2007); Planet Earth II (2017); Planet Earth III (2023)

Films and television
- Films: Earth (2007); Planet Earth Live (2010); Earth: One Amazing Day (2017)
- Television series: Planet Earth (2006); Planet Earth: The Future (2006); Saving Planet Earth (2007); Planet Earth Live (2012); Planet Earth II (2016); Planet Earth III (2023)
- Television film: The Making of 'Planet Earth' (2012)

Audio
- Soundtracks: Planet Earth (2006); Planet Earth II (2016); Planet Earth III (2023)

Planet Earth is a television and film documentary franchise produced and broadcast by the BBC. The franchise began in 2006 following the success of The Blue Planet.

== Development ==
In 2001 the BBC broadcast The Blue Planet, a landmark series on the natural history of the world's oceans. It received critical acclaim, high viewing figures, audience appreciation ratings, and many awards. It also became a hugely profitable global brand, eventually being sold to 150 countries worldwide. Feedback showed that audiences particularly liked the epic scale, the scenes of new and unusual species and the cinematic quality of the series. Programme commissioners were keen for a follow-up, so Alastair Fothergill decided that the Natural History Unit should repeat the formula with a series looking at the whole planet. The idea for Planet Earth was born, and the series was commissioned by Lorraine Heggessey, then Controller of BBC One, in January 2002.

A feature film version of Planet Earth was commissioned alongside the television series, repeating the successful model established with The Blue Planet and its companion film, Deep Blue. Earth was released around the world from 2007 to 2009. There was also another accompanying television series, Planet Earth: The Future, which looked at the environmental problems facing some of the species and habitats featured in the main series in more detail.

== Main television series ==
=== Planet Earth (2006) ===
Planet Earth is a 2006 British television series produced by the BBC Natural History Unit. Five years in the making, it was the most expensive nature documentary series ever commissioned by the BBC and also the first to be filmed in high definition.

Planet Earth premiered on 5 March 2006 in the United Kingdom on BBC One, and by June 2007 had been shown in 130 countries. The series has eleven episodes, each of which features a global overview of a different biome or habitat on Earth. At the end of each fifty-minute episode, a ten-minute featurette takes a behind-the-scenes look at the challenges of filming the series.

=== Planet Earth II (2016) ===
Planet Earth II is a natural history documentary series, produced by the BBC as a sequel to the highly successful Planet Earth television series, which aired roughly a decade earlier, in 2006. The series was presented and narrated by Sir David Attenborough with the score composed by Hans Zimmer.

The first trailer was released on 9 October 2016, and the series was broadcast in November 2016 (United Kingdom) on BBC One and BBC One HD. Planet Earth II is also the first television series that the BBC have produced in Ultra-high-definition (4K).

In 2017, Planet Earth II received multiple Primetime Emmy Awards and nominations: it won Outstanding Cinematography for a Nonfiction Program (Multiple or Single Camera) and Outstanding Music Composition for a Series (Original Dramatic Score), and received additional nominations including Outstanding Narrator (David Attenborough) and several technical categories, as listed on the Television Academy page for the series.

=== Planet Earth III (2023) ===
Planet Earth III is the third part in the Planet Earth trilogy. Announced in August 2023, it was first broadcast from 22 October 2023 to 10 December 2023, comprising eight episodes. The series was presented and narrated by Sir David Attenborough.

In 2024, Planet Earth III received significant recognition at the Primetime Emmy Awards with five nominations: Outstanding Narrator for David Attenborough; Outstanding Music Composition for a Documentary Series or Special; Outstanding Sound Mixing for a Nonfiction Program (Single or Multi-Camera); Outstanding Sound Editing for a Nonfiction or Reality Program (Single or Multi-Camera); and Outstanding Cinematography for a Nonfiction Program.

== Spin-off television series ==
=== Planet Earth: The Future (2006) ===
Planet Earth: The Future is a 2006 BBC documentary series on the environment and conservation, produced by the BBC Natural History Unit as a companion to the multi-award-winning nature documentary Planet Earth. The programmes were originally broadcast on BBC Four immediately after the final three episodes of Planet Earth on BBC One. Each episode highlights the conservation issues surrounding some of the species and environments featured in Planet Earth, using interviews with the film-makers and eminent figures from the fields of science, conservation, politics, and theology. The programmes are narrated by Simon Poland and the series producer was Fergus Beeley.

=== Saving Planet Earth (2007) ===
Saving Planet Earth is a season of nature documentaries with a conservation theme, screened on BBC Television in 2007 to mark the 50th anniversary of its specialist factual department, the BBC Natural History Unit.

The series featured films contributed by a number of celebrities on the plight of various endangered species, and coincided with the launch of the BBC Wildlife Fund, a charitable organisation which distributes money to conservation projects around the world. The television series culminated in a live fundraising telethon on BBC Two, hosted by Alan Titchmarsh, which raised over £1 million for the charity.

The BBC broadcast a second live telethon in 2010. Wild Night In was presented by Kate Humble, Chris Packham and Martin Hughes-Games and featured conservation projects which had benefited from the support of the BBC Wildlife Fund. This helped to raise a further £1 million.

=== Planet Earth Live (2012) ===
Planet Earth Live is a live action nature documentary screened on British television. Produced by the BBC Natural History Unit and broadcast in May 2012, the programme was presented by Richard Hammond and Julia Bradbury.

Planet Earth Live featured real-time footage of young animals from five continents throughout the month of May. Broadcast three times per week, teams of nature experts and documentary makers monitored the activity of animals in their area, reporting back on the day’s events. Animals featured included meerkats in the Kalahari Desert, American black bears in Minnesota, lions and African bush elephants in East Africa, toque macaques in Sri Lanka, gray whales off the coast of California, polar bears in Svalbard and giant otters in Peru.

The programme was shown in May 2012 on BBC One in the United Kingdom and was broadcast in 140 countries in total, making it the most ambitious global wildlife series the BBC had ever undertaken. In the US it was retitled 24/7 Wild and aired on NatGeo Wild; in South Africa, Asia, Australia, Italy, Nordic countries, New Zealand and Poland it was shown on BBC Knowledge; and in India on BBC Entertainment.

== Feature film ==
=== Earth (2007) ===
Alongside the commissioning of the television series, BBC Worldwide and GreenLight Media secured financing for a US$15 million film version of Planet Earth. This followed the earlier success of Deep Blue, the BBC's 2003 theatrical nature documentary which used re-edited footage from The Blue Planet. The film was co-directed by Alastair Fothergill and Mark Linfield and produced by Alix Tidmarsh and Sophokles Tasioulis. Only 30% of the footage shown in Earth is new, with the remainder being reworked from the television series to suit the narrative of the film. David Attenborough was replaced as narrator by high-profile actors: Patrick Stewart for the UK market and James Earl Jones for the United States. Earth had its worldwide premiere in September 2007 at the San Sebastián International Film Festival in San Sebastián, Spain, in Basque Country. Lionsgate released the film in several international markets over the following year. In the United States, it became the first film to be released by Disneynature, the Walt Disney Company's new nature documentary arm. When released on Earth Day 2009 it set the record for the highest opening weekend gross for a nature documentary, and went on to become the third highest grossing documentary of all time. It has grossed more than $108 million worldwide; in the nature documentary genre, only March of the Penguins has achieved greater box-office success. A sequel, Earth: One Amazing Day, was released on 6 October 2017. The film was narrated by Robert Redford.

=== Planet Earth Live (2010) ===
This 90-minute film presents highlights from 2006 television series. Its premier was celebrated in the U.S. with a tour featuring narration and live orchestral accompaniment.

== Television specials ==
=== The Making of Planet Earth (2012) ===
BBC America produced a two-hour making-of documentary narrated by Dan Stevens. It includes interviews with some producers and cameramen of the 2006 series.

== See also ==
- Blue Planet (franchise)
