= Planet Earth (soundtrack) =

Soundtrack album by George Fenton (composer)
- Released: 20 November 2006
- Genre: Soundtrack, Classical music
- Length: 2:13:41
- Label: EMI
- Producer: BBC Records

George Fenton (composer) chronology
Planet Earth (2006)	Planet Earth II (2016)

Planet Earth is a television soundtrack album of incidental music commissioned by the BBC Natural History Unit for its 2006 nature documentary series of the same name. The music was composed and conducted by award-winning composer George Fenton, and performed by the BBC Concert Orchestra. Fenton had previously composed scores for several BBC wildlife series, among them Life in the Freezer, The Trials of Life and the predecessor to Planet Earth, The Blue Planet.

In 2007, the score for the opening episode "From Pole to Pole" won George Fenton an Emmy Award for Outstanding Music Composition for a Series. It was his second win, matching the success of The Blue Planet score five years earlier.

Fenton went on to compose the soundtrack for the 2007 feature film spin-off from the television series, Earth, and recorded it with the Berliner Philharmoniker.

== Reception ==
Professional ratings
Review scores
Source	Rating
AllMusic	4/5 stars
SoundtrackNet	4/5 stars

AllMusic said the album "is as stirring and compelling as the show itself". SoundtrackNet wrote: "Fenton's Planet Earth score is a step beyond his acclaimed music for Blue Planet, and the 2-disc soundtrack is a wonderful compilation of his effort."

== Track listing ==
The Planet Earth soundtrack spans two CDs, the division between the discs mirroring the two parts of the series broadcast in spring and autumn 2006 on British television. The opening song is "The Time has Come" composed by Epic Score.

=== Disc 1 ===
#	Track title	Track length	Episode title
1	"Prelude"	1:57	"From Pole to Pole"
2	"The Journey of the Sun"	3:28	"From Pole to Pole"
3	"Hunting Dogs"	3:26	"From Pole to Pole"
4	"Elephants in the Okavango"	3:07	"From Pole to Pole"
5	"Diving into the Darkness"	3:01	"Caves"
6	"Stalactite Gallery"	2:26	"Caves"
7	"Bat Hunt"	2:59	"Caves"
8	"Discovering Deer Cave"	3:49	"Caves"
9	"Angel Falls"	2:21	"Fresh Water"
10	"River Predation"	4:09	"Fresh Water"
11	"Iguacu"	2:06	"Fresh Water"
12	"The Snow Geese"	2:01	"Fresh Water"
13	"The Geladas"	2:39	"Mountains"
14	"The Snow Leopard"	4:00	"Mountains"
15	"The Karakoram"	1:54	"Mountains"
16	"The Earth's Highest Challenge"	5:31	"Mountains"
17	"Desert Winds / The Locusts"	4:58	"Deserts"
18	"Fly Catchers"	1:42	"Deserts"
19	"Namibia — The Lions and the Oryx"	5:10	"Deserts"

=== Disc 2 ===
#	Track title	Track length	Episode title
1	"Plains High and Low"	2:40	"Great Plains"
2	"The Wolf and the Caribou"	3:47	"Great Plains"
3	"Tibet (Reprise) / Close"	3:46	"Great Plains"
4	"Surfing Dolphins"	2:41	"Shallow Seas"
5	"Dangerous Landing"	3:20	"Shallow Seas"
6	"Mother and Calf — The Great Journey"	5:19	"Shallow Seas"
7	"The Canopy / Flying Lemur"	2:45	"Jungles"
8	"Frog Ballet / Jungle Falls"	2:37	"Jungles"
9	"The Cordyceps"	2:55	"Jungles"
10	"Hunting Chimps"	4:10	"Jungles"
11	"The Redwoods"	4:40	"Seasonal Forests"
12	"Fledglings"	3:43	"Seasonal Forests"
13	"Seasonal Change"	5:40	"Seasonal Forests"
14	"Discovering Antarctica"	2:42	"Ice Worlds"
15	"The Humpbacks' Bubblenet"	2:59	"Ice Worlds"
16	"Everything Leaves but the Emperors"	2:27	"Ice Worlds"
17	"The Disappearing Sea Ice"	3:45	"Ice Worlds"
18	"Lost in the Storm"	1:16	"Ice Worlds"
19	"A School of Five Hundred"	3:39	"Ocean Deep"
20	"Giant Mantas"	2:50	"Ocean Deep"
21	"Life Near the Surface"	2:06	"Ocean Deep"
22	"The Choice is Ours"	3:13	"Ocean Deep"
