= Blue Planet II =

2017 British nature documentary television series

- Genre: Nature documentary
- Presented by: David Attenborough
- Composers: Hans Zimmer; David Fleming; Jacob Shea
- Country of origin: United Kingdom
- Original language: English
- No. of episodes: 7

Production
- Executive producers: James Honeyborne; Mark Brownlow
- Producers: Miles Barton; Orla Doherty; Kathryn Jeffs; Will Ridgeon; John Ruthven; Jonathan Smith
- Running time: 60 minutes
- Production company: BBC Natural History Unit

Original release
- Network: BBC One; BBC Earth
- Release: 29 October – 10 December 2017

Related
- The Blue Planet; Blue Planet III; Blue Planet (franchise); Planet Earth (franchise)

Blue Planet II is a 2017 British nature documentary series on marine life produced as a co-production between the BBC Natural History Unit, BBC America, Tencent, WDR, France Télévisions and CCTV-9 in partnership with The Open University. It is a successor to The Blue Planet (2001) with naturalist Sir David Attenborough reprising his role as the narrator.

Blue Planet II received acclaim. It had the highest viewing figures of any television programme in the UK in 2017, and was so widely watched in China that it reportedly caused internet problems. It is credited with increasing public and political interest in issues affecting marine life, in particular marine plastic pollution, which was dubbed "the Blue Planet effect".

== Production ==
The series was announced by the BBC in 2013 with the working title Oceans, but the title was later changed to Blue Planet II as was revealed on 19 February 2017, making it a follow-up to the 2001 series The Blue Planet. Filming took place over a course of more than four years; involving 125 expeditions across 39 countries and produced more than 6,000 hours of underwater dive footage from over an estimated 4,000 dives.

The score was composed by Hans Zimmer, Jacob Shea and David Fleming. The rock band Radiohead reworked their 2011 song "Bloom" with Zimmer for the series.

== Release ==
Blue Planet II debuted on 29 October 2017 and was simultaneously cast on BBC One, BBC One HD and BBC Earth, making it the first natural history series to premiere on the same day in the UK, Nordic regions, Europe and in Asia. In the US, it premiered on 20 January 2018, as part of a five-network simulcast on BBC America, AMC, IFC, Sundance, and WE tv.

=== United Kingdom ===
The premiere of the series took place at Bristol's Cinema de Lux on 11 October 2017, with special guest appearance by Attenborough along with the producers and wildlife experts. Bristol has been the global home of BBC's Natural History programme making for the past 60 years. The series was first broadcast on 29 October 2017 (from 20:00 GMT to 21:00 GMT) on BBC One and BBC One HD. The first six episodes included a 10-minute making-of documentary called Into the Blue. The previous week's episode was repeated in an earlier time slot the following Sunday. The series was critically acclaimed and gained the highest UK viewing figure for 2017, 14.1 million.

=== International ===
BBC Worldwide pre-sold the series to several overseas broadcasters, which includes Canada (Blue Ant Media's licensed channel for BBC Earth), Australia (Channel Nine) and New Zealand (TVNZ), to Europe with Denmark (DR), Netherlands (NPO), Sweden (SVT), Spain (Telefonica's BBC Earth block), Discovery Channel for Latin America and co-production partnerships with BBC America, Germany's WDR, France Télévisions, China's Tencent and CCTV-9. The series was eventually sold to more than 30 countries.

The series is set to broadcast internationally on BBC Earth channel, and also commercial television channels in various countries, besides. The series debuted in Nordic regions and other European countries on 29 October 2017. In Asia, the series began to premiere on each early Monday (from 04:05 SGT to 05:05 SGT) starting from 30 October 2017, the episode was then repeated on following each Tuesday evening (from 20:00 SGT). In Poland, it premiered on 16 November 2017. As for South Africa, it aired from 4 February 2018.

In China, the premiere took place at Shanghai's East China Normal University on 27 October 2017, with guest appearance by the producer Orla Doherty and Mike Gunton, the executive producer of Planet Earth II. The series is streaming broadcast at Tencent's QQLive from 30 October 2017, with episodes updating every Monday at 18:00 CST. It would also be broadcast on the state owned China Central Television's documentary channel, CCTV-9, with episodes airing each Monday from 6 November 2017 at 21:00 CST.

In the Netherlands, the series is airing on the Dutch channel NPO 1, with episodes airing each Thursday from 28 December 2017. In Belgium, it will air on the Flemish channel Canvas, with episodes airing each Saturday starting from 2 January 2018. The series aired in Canada and the United States on 20 January 2018. In Canada, it will broadcast with a three-network simulcast across BBC Earth, Cottage Life and T+E channel. In the United States, the series premiered the first episode – with a five-network simulcast across BBC America, AMC, IFC, WE tv and Sundance TV, while the remaining episodes continued to be aired every Saturday on BBC America. It is also available on BBCAmerica.com and the BBCA app.

As for Australia, the series will premiere on Nine Network and 9Now on 17 February 2018. In New Zealand, it premiered on 12 November 2017 on TVNZ 1. For Singapore, the series premiered on Mediacorp Channel 5 on Sundays starting 27 May 2018. In Greece, all the seven original episodes were broadcast from 12 April 2020 until 18 April 2020 at 10.30pm on the free-to-air television network Skai TV.

== Episodes ==
No.	Title	Produced by	Original release date	UK viewers (millions)
–	"The Prequel"	N/A	27 September 2017	N/A
A 5-minute clip introduction which focuses in particular on the upcoming stories from the ocean depths.
1	"One Ocean"	Jonathan Smith	29 October 2017	14.01
Animals featured include bottlenose dolphins that surf and rub themselves in corals in the Red Sea, smart tuskfish that use coral to break open clam shells, large packs of giant trevallies hunting tern chicks in atolls in the Indian Ocean, false killer whales joining a pack of bottlenose dolphins in New Zealand, a female kobudai changing its sex to male, orca and humpback whales feasting in large schools of herring in Norway and walruses trying to rest on the melting ice in the Arctic to escape polar bears.
2	"The Deep"	Orla Doherty	5 November 2017	13.97
The depths of the ocean are among the most difficult conditions in the world. The depths of Antarctica host diverse endemic creatures. In other oceans, giant tunicate – pyrosome, swordfish, cock-eyed squid and barreleyes are specially adapted to dark conditions, and large Humboldt squids hunt lanternfish then cannibalise one another. The deep sea anglerfish and dragonfish attracts prey, and fangtooths eat fish and squid. In the deep, a sperm whale carcass attracts many scavengers, such as bluntnose sixgill sharks, spider crabs, rock crabs, and osedax; as well as the scavenger's predators, including silver scabbardfish. Also features shrimps living in a Venus' flower basket sponge, swimming pools of brine in the Gulf of Mexico, and the life found in the Mariana Trench, including the snailfish.
3	"Coral Reefs"	Jonathan Smith	12 November 2017	13.45
Coral reefs are a large habitat created by tiny creatures called coral polyps. Features broadclub cuttlefish searching prey, coral trout cooperatively hunting with octopus, Green sea turtles in Borneo cleaned by surgeonfish and blennies, bottlenose dolphins playing, a bobbit worm hunting in the sands of the reef, a family of saddleback clownfish transporting a shell on which to lay their eggs, and marbled groupers breeding in French Polynesia while grey reef sharks attack.
4	"Big Blue"	John Ruthven	19 November 2017	13.11
A large school of spinner dolphins chase lanternfish with yellowfin tuna, sailfish and the mobula ray, sperm whales with their calves hunting squid, young sea turtles find refuge at flotsam, blue sharks scavenge a whale carcass with the world's largest predatory fish, the great white shark. A Portuguese man o' war floats in the current waiting for small fish, whale sharks breed in the Galápagos Islands along with hammerhead and silky sharks, and wandering albatrosses raising their chicks. Highlights the effects of plastic on marine life, with a short-finned pilot whale family mourning a calf that died after ingesting milk contaminated with plastic particles.
5	"Green Seas"	Kathryn Jeffs	26 November 2017	12.62
Within kelp forests, starfish release their eggs, which are consumed by sea cucumbers and sea pens. Common octopus escape from pyjama sharks by hiding inside shells; Garibaldi hide from torpedo rays and try to protect their patches of seaweed from grazers and from a plague of sea urchins, whose numbers are kept in check by sea otters. In Australia, green sea turtles graze on seagrass beds and are chased by tiger sharks. Other inhabitants of the seagrass beds are spider crabs coming to moult with protection from a short-tail stingray, giant cuttlefish mating, and weedy seadragon fathers carrying eggs. In the mangrove roots of North Australia, a zebra mantis shrimp hunts small fish for his mate. A large pack of common dolphins, California sea lions and humpback whales feasting in school of anchovies, themselves feeding on phytoplankton, in Monterey Bay.
6	"Coasts"	Miles Barton	3 December 2017	11.45
Animals featured include thousands of olive ridley sea turtles that come up to land to lay their eggs; Galápagos sea lion catching yellowfin tuna in the shallow bay of the coast; rock pool creatures including predators like starfish, sea anemones and clingfishes that prey on limpets and bivalves; a chain moray eel and an octopus hunt Sally Lightfoot crabs in Brazil, puffins and common murres avoiding arctic skuas, Pacific leaping blennies making their home on land; a colony of king penguins crossing a colony of fiercely territorial southern elephant seals; and large groups of spinner sharks and blacktip sharks off the coast of Palm Beach, Florida.
7	"Our Blue Planet"	Orla Doherty, Will Ridgeon	10 December 2017	11.91
Examining the role of human anthropogenic activity on the oceans. Microplastics and pollution are an increasing problem for the world's seas, threatening the lives of marine life and ultimately affecting the ecosystem. Can humans reverse their activity to protect the seas and the wildlife that inhabit it?
–	"Oceans of Wonder"	N/A	1 January 2018	N/A
A 90-minute compilation episode which highlights the wonders of our world's oceans as well as filming some extraordinary animal behaviours which were never seen before.

== Music ==
Blue Planet II

Soundtrack album by Hans Zimmer, David Fleming & Jacob Shea
- Released: 29 October 2017 (Digital); 1 December 2017 (Audio CD)
- Genres: Soundtrack, Classical music
- Length: 1:11:29
- Label: Silva Screen Records
- Producers: BBC Worldwide; BBC Earth

Hans Zimmer returned to score Blue Planet II. The score and songs featured in the series were composed by Zimmer, Jacob Shea and David Fleming for Bleeding Fingers Music. It was recorded at Synchron Stage Vienna.

Zimmer collaborated with the English rock band Radiohead to record a new version of their song "Bloom" from their 2011 album The King of Limbs. The new track, "(ocean) bloom", was recorded with the BBC Concert Orchestra, which attempted to emulate a "tidal effect". In a press release, the Radiohead singer, Thom Yorke, said "Bloom" had been inspired by the original Blue Planet and so he was happy to "come full circle with the song". It was used as the soundtrack for a Blue Planet II prequel video released by the BBC to promote the series.

A digital soundtrack was released on 29 October 2017, while a single physical disc was released on 1 December 2017 in the UK. The soundtrack was released as special edition LP for Record Store Day on 21 April 2018.

== Reception ==
=== Critical response ===
On the review aggregator website Rotten Tomatoes, 97% of 31 critics' reviews are positive, with an average rating of 9.4/10. The website's consensus reads: "Blue Planet II's hypnotic beauty is complemented by intense ethical musing, contrasting the micro and the macro in a humbling exploration of humanity's relationship with the ground it stands on." On Metacritic the film has a weighted average score of 97 out of 100 based on seven critics, indicating "universal acclaim".

In a positive review, Ed Yong of The Atlantic called Blue Planet II "the greatest nature series that the BBC has ever produced". The Guardian columnist George Monbiot criticised the series for mostly omitting the impact of the fishing industry on the oceans: "It's as if you were to make a film about climate breakdown without revealing the role of fossil fuel companies". Monbiot stated that the film's only mention of the fishing industry was a story "about how kind Norwegian herring boats are to orcas".

=== Impact ===
The programme has been credited with raising awareness of plastic pollution both domestically and internationally, an influence dubbed the 'Blue Planet effect'. After the first episode aired in the UK, there was a surge in search engine enquiries about conservation charities, with the Marine Conservation Society, WWF and Plastic Oceans Foundation all receiving a significant spike in traffic. Following the programme's airing in the UK, the BBC announced its intention to completely ban single-use plastics within its organisation by 2020. In April 2018, in response to growing public support directly linked to Blue Planet II, the British government announced it was considering a national ban on single-use plastic products. It was also reported that Queen Elizabeth II's decision to ban plastic bottles and straws across the Royal estates was in part a response to the documentary. A 2020 study suggested that the programme triggered long-lasting increased political, media and public interest in plastic pollution in the UK, where previous efforts to do so had not been successful. Another study found that watching the single documentary did not influence participants to change their individual plastic consumption behaviour, even if they were made more aware of the issue or if it had a wider societal impact.

British universities such as the University of Southampton noticed a sudden increase in applications for marine biology courses following the programme's airing, which was again attributed to the 'Blue Planet effect'. It was reported that the number of people in China simultaneously streaming Blue Planet II (approximately 80 million) had a noticeable impact upon internet speeds within the country. The popularity of the documentary in China was cited as partly the reason British prime minister Theresa May gave Chinese president Xi Jinping a Blue Planet II box set signed by David Attenborough. It was also symbolic of a joint plan to tackle plastic pollution and the illegal wildlife trade, announced by British officials during Xi's 2018 visit.

=== Accolades ===
Year	Award	Category	Nominee	Result	Ref.
2018	National Television Awards	Impact Award	Blue Planet II & David Attenborough	Won	
2018	British Academy Television Awards	Huw Wheldon Award for Specialist Factual	Blue Planet II	Nominated	
2018	British Academy Television Awards	Virgin TV's Must-See Moments	"Mother Pilot Whale Grieves"	Won	
2018	British Academy Television Craft Awards	Best Editing: Factual	Matt Meech (for: "One Ocean")	Nominated	
2018	British Academy Television Craft Awards	Best Editing: Factual	Nigel Buck (for: "The Deep")	Nominated	
2018	British Academy Television Craft Awards	Best Photography: Factual	Camera Team (for: "One Ocean")	Won	
2018	British Academy Television Craft Awards	Best Titles & Graphic Identity	BDH Creative	Nominated	
2018	British Academy Television Craft Awards	Best Sound: Factual	Graham Wild, Tim Owens, Kate Hopkins (for: "Coral Reefs")	Won	
2018	Primetime Creative Arts Emmy Awards	Outstanding Documentary or Nonfiction Series	James Honeybourne, Mark Brownlow and Jonathan Smith	Nominated	
2018	Primetime Creative Arts Emmy Awards	Outstanding Cinematography for a Nonfiction Program	Gavin Thurston (for "The Deep")	Nominated	
2018	Primetime Creative Arts Emmy Awards	Outstanding Cinematography for a Nonfiction Program	Ted Giffords and Roger Munns (for "Open Ocean")	Nominated	
2018	Primetime Creative Arts Emmy Awards	Outstanding Sound Editing for a Nonfiction Program (Single or Multi-Camera)	Kate Hopkins and Tim Owens (for "Coral Reefs")	Nominated	
2018	Primetime Creative Arts Emmy Awards	Outstanding Narrator	David Attenborough (for "One Ocean")	Won	
2018	Peabody Awards	Documentary	Blue Planet II	Nominated	
2019	Royal Television Society Awards	Science and Natural History	Blue Planet II	Nominated	

== Home media ==
=== DVD and Blu-ray ===
The series was released as a three-disc DVD set as well as a standard Blu-ray set on 27 November 2017, and as a six-disc 4K UHD Blu-ray + Blu-ray set on 15 January 2018. It is distributed by BBC Worldwide in the UK.

In the US and Canada, the DVD, Blu-ray and 4K UHD Blu-ray sets were released on 6 March 2018 and distributed by BBC Worldwide Americas.

== Other media ==
=== Book ===
An accompanying hardback book was written by James Honeyborne and Mark Brownlow, with foreword by David Attenborough. It was published by BBC Books (ISBN 978-1849909679). The book was released on 19 October 2017 in the UK and on 1 January 2018 in the US.

=== Open University poster ===
A free poster was made available through the Open University's OpenLearn website.
