= Blue Planet (franchise) =

BBC nature documentary franchise

The Blue Planet
- Original work: The Blue Planet (2001)
- Owner: BBC
- Years: 2001-present

Films and television
- Television series: The Blue Planet (2001); Blue Planet II (2017); Blue Planet III (2026)

The Blue Planet is a television and film documentary franchise produced and broadcast by the BBC. It explores the world's oceans, and their wildlife and future.

== Main television series ==
All three series are produced by the BBC Studios Natural History Unit with narration by David Attenborough.

=== The Blue Planet (2001) ===
The Blue Planet was broadcast in 2001. It won two Emmy Awards. BBC Worldwide published a companion book written by Andrew Byatt, Alastair Fothergill and Martha Holmes with a foreword by David Attenborough.

=== Blue Planet II (2017) ===
Blue Planet II was a sequel series. It was broadcast in HD and released in 4K UHD on Blu-Ray.

=== Blue Planet III (2026) ===
Blue Planet III is scheduled to be broadcast in 2026.

== Film releases ==
=== Deep Blue (2003) ===
Deep Blue is a 2003 nature documentary film that is a theatrical release of The Blue Planet.

=== Oceans: Our Blue Planet (2018) ===
Oceans: Our Blue Planet is a 2018 short documentary film produced by the BBC to mark the release of Blue Planet II. It was narrated by Kate Winslet.

== Live tours ==
The BBC has presented live tours with orchestra of the music of The Blue Planet and Blue Planet II.

== See also ==
- Planet Earth (franchise)
