= Othello (1980 film) =

- Directed by: Liz White
- Based on: Othello by William Shakespeare
- Produced by: Liz White
- Starring: Yaphet Kotto; Richard Dixon; Audrey Dixon; Lewis Chisholm, Jr. Olive Bowles; Douglas Gray; Liz White; Benjamin Ashburn; Jim Williams
- Cinematography: Charles Dorkins
- Music by: Jonas Gwangwa
- Release date: 1980
- Running time: 115 minutes
- Country: United States
- Language: English
- Budget: $200,000 USD

Othello is Liz White's dramatic adaptation of William Shakespeare's Othello. An all black cast and crew, including actor Yaphet Kotto, created the film.

== Cast ==
- Yaphet Kotto as Othello
- Benjamin Ashburn as Montano
- Olive Bowles as Emilia
- Louis Chisholm, Jr. as Cassio
- Audrey Dixon as Desdemona
- Richard Dixon as Iago
- Douglas Gray as Roderigo
- Lincoln Pope as Duke of Venice
- Liz White as Bianca
- Jim Williams as Brabantio

== Production ==
White's Othello began as an acclaimed performance in 1960-1961 at Shearer Summer Theater, White's own repository company on Martha's Vineyeard, and in 1960 in Harlem. Shearer began the repository with a mission to create more roles for the black actors and more jobs for black theater technicians. The entire cast and crew of the film are black.

=== Filming ===
With help from Charles Dorkins, White directed the film over the summers from 1962-1966. Most involved with the project were students or maintained part- or full-time jobs during filming—even White worked as a stage dresser during production. The film was further delayed when Yaphet Kotto began his Hollywood movie career.

=== Casting ===
White herself played Bianca and she enlisted her son and daughter-in-law, Richard and Audrey Dixon, as Iago and Desdemona.

== Release ==
The film did not screen until 1980, when it had its official debut at Howard University. In White's biography in the promotion materials for the debut, it reads: "[Liz] works out of her apartment in the Dunbar complex in Harlem and at the editing space she rents in the Screen Building on Broadway. She is cutting and editing a print of her feature length film, "Othello", sleeping on the studio floor some nights." The film's release was in part due to White's reluctance to label the film an "art" film. She attempted to market the film to various studios, including Warner Brothers. It has never been released commercially.
