= Heligimbal =

Camera system mounted on a helicopter

The Cineflex Heligimbal is a form of gimbal technology consisting of a motion-stabilized helicopter mount for motion picture cameras.

The technology, originally developed by the military, provides a high degree of motion stabilization and telephoto capabilities to achieve high-quality aerial shots despite the vibration inherent in helicopter flights which makes capturing high-definition video otherwise impossible. The gyro-stabilized system works with the operator using a joystick from within the helicopter to control the camera movements.

The BBC introduced the general public to this technology in the production of the first episode of its 2006 television series Planet Earth: "An innovative heli-gimbal (sic) stabilizing device supporting a tiny high definition camera on a helicopter delivers extensive rock-steady aerial footage of animals in remote landscapes, and allows for cutting and zooming between close-ups and extreme longshots".
