= 9 North =

Region of hydrothermal vents on the East Pacific Rise in the Pacific Ocean

9 North, or Nine North, is a region of hydrothermal vents on the East Pacific Rise in the Pacific Ocean, 900 kilometers off the coast of Acapulco, Mexico; it has been so named by scientists because its latitude is 9°50' N. It was first seen to erupt in 1991 by the deep submersible Alvin during a survey for the Ocean Drilling Program. In November 1999, scientists, students, education specialists, and film crews returned to 9 North to see how the biology and landscape had changed over time. IMAX, National Geographic, and BBC film crews have made videos about the vents at 9 North, most noticeably Volcanoes of the Deep Sea (2003).

BBC Planet Earth series from 2006 reported that 9 North either extinguished or became inactive during the period that BBC was creating the series. All previously extant forms of life- crustaceans (shrimps, crabs) and tube worms- were observed to have disappeared (either died, or left the site), perhaps signalling the extinction of lifeforms unique to these particular vents.
