= Orla Doherty =

Irish television producer

- Occupation: Producer
- Employer: BBC Studios Natural History Unit
- Notable work: BBC Blue Planet II episodes: The Deep and Our Blue Planet
- Awards: Vogue's Women Shaping 2018

Orla Doherty is an Irish producer with the BBC Studios Natural History Unit. She is known for producing The Deep and co-producing Our Blue Planet episodes for the BBC's Blue Planet II.

== Early life and career ==
Doherty's family comes from Donegal, Ireland. She has a degree in chemistry. She began working in television for DEF II, a part of BBC Two. At 30 she tried scuba diving for the first time during a trip to Thailand, which led her to move away at 31 to start studying coral reefs for a non-governmental organization, the Planetary Coral Reef Foundation. She spent most of the next 10 years on a ship studying the reefs in the Pacific Ocean. Upon her return, she began working for the BBC's Natural History Unit, and in 2013 she joined the production team of the BBC's Blue Planet II. In 2018 she produced the documentary Oceans: Our Blue Planet. That same year, she was named one of Vogue's Women Shaping 2018. In 2019, she became co-executive producer on the documentary series Mission OceanX.

== Blue Planet II ==
Doherty worked as a producer for Blue Planet II for four years. In total she spent two and a half years filming, divided over 17 expeditions. She produced The Deep episode, for which she spent 500 hours in a submarine under water, going as deep as 1000 meters. She was one of the first people to go that deep in the Antarctic. She was among the team that filmed a whale fall for the first time in the Atlantic Ocean. She also co-produced the final episode of the series, named Our Blue Planet, which showed the effect of plastics and pollution on the ocean. For this episode, she filmed scientists from all over the world.
