= 23rd TCA Awards =

US television awards ceremony in 2007

- Date: July 21, 2007
- Venue: Beverly Hilton Hotel

Highlights
- Program of the Year: Heroes
- Outstanding New Program: Friday Night Lights

The 23rd TCA Awards were presented by the Television Critics Association. John Oliver hosted the ceremony on July 21, 2007 at the Beverly Hilton Hotel.

== Winners and nominees ==
| Category | Winner | Other Nominees |
|---|---|---|
| Program of the Year | Heroes (NBC) | American Idol (Fox); Friday Night Lights (NBC); Planet Earth (Discovery Channel); When the Levees Broke (HBO); The Wire (HBO) |
| Outstanding Achievement in Comedy | The Office (NBC) | 30 Rock (NBC); The Daily Show with Jon Stewart (Comedy Central); Entourage (HBO); Ugly Betty (ABC) |
| Outstanding Achievement in Drama | The Sopranos (HBO) | Friday Night Lights (NBC); Heroes (NBC); Lost (ABC); The Wire (HBO) |
| Outstanding Achievement in Movies, Miniseries and Specials | Planet Earth (Discovery Channel) | Broken Trail (AMC); Prime Suspect 7: The Final Act (PBS); The State Within (BBC America); When the Levees Broke (HBO) |
| Outstanding New Program of the Year | Friday Night Lights (NBC) | 30 Rock (NBC); Dexter (Showtime); Heroes (NBC); Ugly Betty (ABC) |
| Individual Achievement in Comedy | Alec Baldwin - 30 Rock (NBC) | Stephen Colbert - The Colbert Report (Comedy Central); America Ferrera - Ugly Betty (ABC); Tina Fey - 30 Rock (NBC); Jon Stewart - The Daily Show with Jon Stewart (Comedy Central) |
| Individual Achievement in Drama | Michael C. Hall - Dexter (Showtime) | Connie Britton - Friday Night Lights (NBC); Kyle Chandler - Friday Night Lights (NBC); Hugh Laurie - House (Fox); Helen Mirren - Prime Suspect 7: The Final Act (PBS) |
| Outstanding Achievement in Children's Programming | Kyle XY (ABC Family) | Dora the Explorer (Nickelodeon); Johnny and the Sprites (Disney Channel); Lincoln Heights (ABC Family); SpongeBob SquarePants (Nickelodeon) |
| Outstanding Achievement in News and Information | Planet Earth (Discovery Channel) | Baghdad ER (HBO); Bill Moyers Journal (PBS); Galápagos (National Geographic Channel); When the Levees Broke (HBO) |
| Heritage Award | The Sopranos (HBO) | M*A*S*H (CBS); The Mary Tyler Moore Show (CBS); Roots (ABC); Sesame Street (PBS) |
| Career Achievement Award | Mary Tyler Moore | No other nominees |

=== Multiple wins ===
The following shows received multiple wins:

| Wins | Recipient |
|---|---|
| 2 | Planet Earth |
| 2 | The Sopranos |

=== Multiple nominations ===
The following shows received multiple nominations:

| Nominations | Recipient |
|---|---|
| 5 | Friday Night Lights |
| 4 | 30 Rock |
| 3 | Heroes |
| 3 | Planet Earth |
| 3 | Ugly Betty |
| 3 | When the Levees Broke |
| 2 | The Daily Show with Jon Stewart |
| 2 | Dexter |
| 2 | Prime Suspect 7: The Final Act |
| 2 | The Sopranos |
| 2 | The Wire |
