= Elizabeth White =

Elizabeth White may refer to

- Elisabeth White (born 1976), Australian filmmaker
- Elizabeth Coleman White (1871–1954), New Jersey agricultural specialist
- Liz White (actress) (born 1979), English actress
- Liz White (activist) (born c. 1950), Canadian animal rights activist
- Elizabeth Shearer White (fl. 1946–1993), independent American film producer, founder of the Shearer Summer Theatre in Martha's Vineyard
- Polingaysi Qöyawayma (1892–1990), also known as Elizabeth Q. White, Hopi educator, writer, and potter
- Elizabeth Wade White (1906–1994), American author, poet, and activist
