= Yaphet Kotto =

American actor (1939–2021)

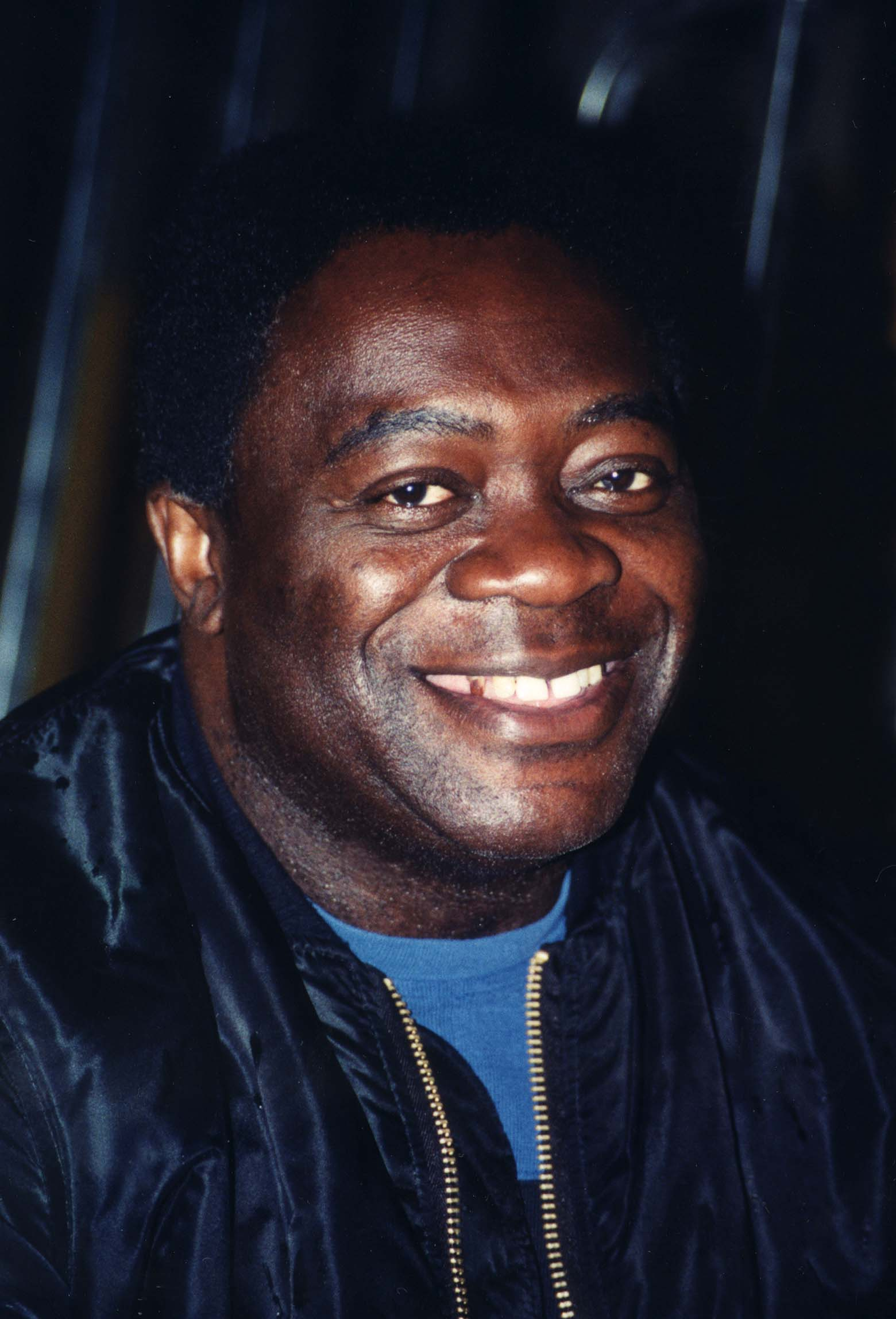
- Kotto in 1995
- Born: Frederick Samuel Kotto; November 15, 1939; New York City, U.S.
- Died: March 15, 2021 (aged 81); Manila, Philippines
- Occupation: Actor
- Years active: 1963–2014
- Height: 6 ft 4 in (193 cm)
- Spouses: Rita Ingried Dittman (m. 1959; div. 1976) Toni Pettyjohn (m. 1975; div. 1989) Tessie Sinahon (m. 1998)
- Children: 7

Yaphet Frederick Kotto (November 15, 1939 – March 15, 2021) was an American actor for film and television. His films include the neo-noir action thriller Across 110th Street (1972), the James Bond film Live and Let Die (1973), the science-fiction horror film Alien (1979), the science-fiction action film The Running Man (1987), and the action comedy Midnight Run (1988). He also starred in the NBC television series Homicide: Life on the Street (1993–1999) as Lieutenant Al Giardello.

== Early life ==
Kotto was born in New York City. His mother, Gladys Marie, was an American nurse and U.S. Army officer of Panamanian and Antiguan descent. His father, Avraham Kotto (who was, according to his son, originally named Njoki Manga Bell), was a businessman from Cameroon who immigrated to the United States in the 1920s. Kotto's father was raised Jewish and his mother converted to Judaism. The couple separated when Kotto was a child, and he was raised by his maternal grandparents.

By the age of 16, Kotto was studying acting at the Actors Mobile Theater Studio.

== Career ==
At age 19, Kotto made his professional acting debut in Othello. He was a member of the Actors Studio in New York. Kotto got his start in acting on Broadway, where he appeared in The Great White Hope, among other productions.

His film debut was in 1963, aged 23, in an uncredited role in 4 for Texas. He performed in Michael Roemer's Nothing but a Man (1964) and played a supporting role in the caper film The Thomas Crown Affair (1968). He played John Auston, a confused Marine Lance Corporal, in the 1968 episode "King of the Hill", on the first season of Hawaii Five-O.

In 1967, he released a single, "Have You Ever Seen the Blues" / "Have You Dug His Scene" (Chisa Records, CH006).

In 1973, he landed the role of the James Bond villain Mr. Big in Live and Let Die, as well as roles in Across 110^{th} Street and Truck Turner. He played a police officer, Richard "Crunch" Blackstone, in the 1975 film Report to the Commissioner. Kotto portrayed Idi Amin in the 1977 television film Raid on Entebbe. He starred as an auto worker in the 1978 film Blue Collar. The following year he played Parker in the sci-fi–horror film Alien. He followed with a supporting role in the 1980 prison drama Brubaker. In 1983, he guest-starred as mobster Charlie "East Side Charlie" Struthers in The A-Team episode "The Out-of-Towners". In 1987, he appeared in the futuristic sci-fi movie The Running Man, and in 1988, in the action-comedy Midnight Run, in which he portrayed Alonzo Moseley, an FBI agent. A memo from Paramount indicates that Kotto was among those being considered for Jean-Luc Picard in Star Trek: The Next Generation, a role which eventually went to Patrick Stewart.

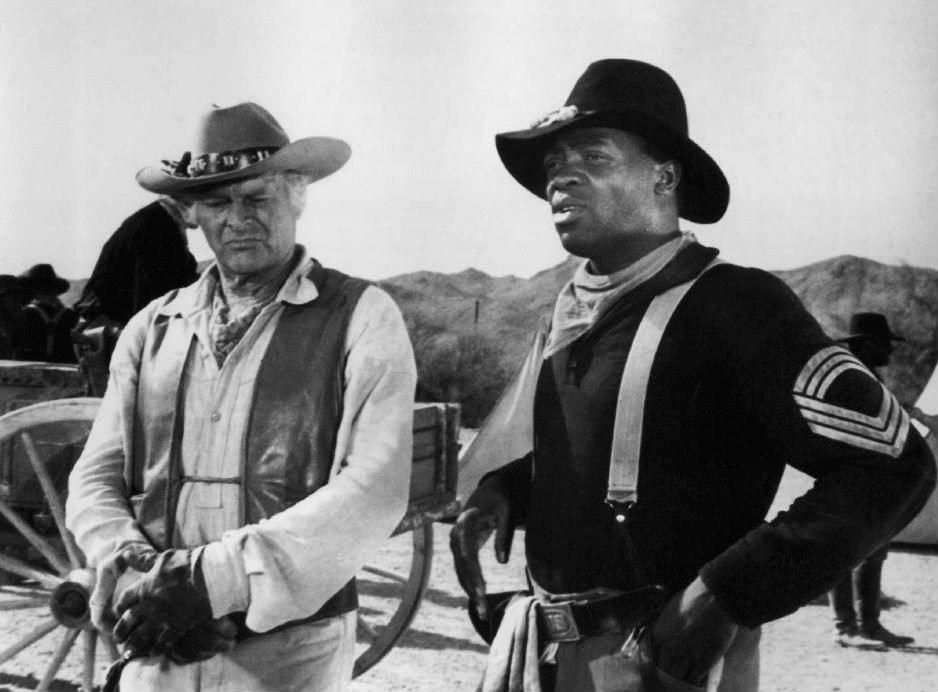
Kotto acting alongside Leif Erickson in the television series The High Chaparral in 1968

Kotto was cast as a religious man living in the southwestern desert country in the 1967 episode "A Man Called Abraham" on the syndicated anthology series Death Valley Days, hosted by Robert Taylor.

Kotto retired from film acting in the mid-1990s, though he had one final film role in Witless Protection (2008). However, he continued to take on television roles. Kotto portrayed Lieutenant Al Giardello in the long-running television series Homicide: Life on the Street. As a black Sicilian proud of his Italian ancestry, the character was a breakout for television. He has written the book Royalty and also wrote scripts for Homicide. In 2014, he voiced Parker for the video game Alien: Isolation, reprising the role he played in the movie Alien in 1979.

== Personal life ==
Kotto's first marriage, in 1959, was to a German immigrant, Rita Ingrid Dittman. They had three children and divorced in 1976. Later, Kotto married Toni Pettyjohn, and they also had three children together before divorcing in 1989. Kotto married his third wife, Tessie Sinahon, who was from the Philippines, in 1998.

Kotto was raised in the Catholic faith and attended Holy Cross Grammar School in the Soundview section of the Bronx during the early to mid-fifties.

Kotto became Jewish, and versed in the Hebrew liturgy and incorporated Jewish prayers at turning points throughout his life. He said his father "instilled Judaism" in him.

In 2000, he was living in Marmora, Ontario, Canada.

== Death ==
Kotto died at the age of 81 on March 15, 2021, near Manila, Philippines. His wife announced the news on Facebook.

== Filmography ==
=== Film ===
Year	Title	Role	Notes	Ref.
1963	4 for Texas	Extra	Uncredited	
1964	Nothing but a Man	Jocko		
1968	The Thomas Crown Affair	Carl		
1968	5 Card Stud	George "Little George", Mama's Bartender		
1970	The Liberation of L.B. Jones	Sonny "Sonny Boy" Mosby		
1971	Man and Boy	Nate Hodges		
1972	Bone	"Bone"		
1972	The Limit	Mark Johnson	Also director	
1972	Across 110^{th} Street	Lieutenant Pope		
1973	Live and Let Die	Dr. Kananga / Mr. Big		
1974	Truck Turner	Harvard Blue		
1975	Report to the Commissioner	Richard "Crunch" Blackstone		
1975	Sharks' Treasure	Ben Flynn		
1975	Friday Foster	Colt Hawkins		
1976	Drum	Blaise		
1976	The Monkey Hustle	"Big Daddy" Foxx		
1978	Blue Collar	Sam "Smokey" James		
1979	Alien	Dennis Parker, Technician		
1980	Brubaker	Dickie Coombes		
1980	Othello	Othello	No commercial release	
1982	Fighting Back	Ivanhoe Washington		
1983	The Star Chamber	Detective Harry Lowes		
1984	Terror in the Aisles	Himself		
1985	Warning Sign	Major Connolly		
1986	The Park Is Mine	Eubanks		
1986	Eye of the Tiger	J.B. Deveraux		
1987	Prettykill	Harris		
1987	Terminal Entry	Colonel Styles		
1987	The Running Man	William Laughlin		
1988	Midnight Run	FBI Special Agent Alonzo Mosely		
1989	The Jigsaw Murders	Dr. Filmore		
1989	A Whisper To A Scream	Jules Tallard		
1989	Ministry of Vengeance	Mr. Whiteside		
1989	Tripwire	Lee Pitt		
1991	Hangfire	Police Lieutenant		
1991	Freddy's Dead: The Final Nightmare	Doc		
1992	Intent to Kill	Captain Jackson		
1993	Extreme Justice	Detective Larson		
1994	The Puppet Masters	Ressler		
1995	Dead Badge	Captain Hunt		
1995	Out-of-Sync	Quincy		
1996	Two If by Sea	FBI Agent O'Malley		
1996	Almost Blue	Terry		
2008	Witless Protection	Ricardo Bodi	Final film role	

=== Television ===
Year	Title	Role	Notes	Ref.
1966–1967	The Big Valley	"Lobo" Brown; Damien	2 episodes	
1967	Death Valley Days	Abraham	Episode: "A Man Called Abraham"	
1968	Bonanza	Joshua "Child" Barnett	Episode: "Child"	
1968	The High Chaparral	Sergeant Major	Episode: "The Buffalo Soldiers"; Western Heritage Bronze Wrangler Award for Best Fictional Television Drama	
1968	Daniel Boone	Luke	Episode: Big, Black and out There	
1969	Mannix	Gabe Johnson / Gabriel Dillon	Episode: "Death in a Minor Key"	
1969	Hawaii Five-O	Marine Lance Corporal John T. Auston	Episode: "King of the Hill"	
1969	Daniel Boone	Jonah	Episode: "Jonah"	
1970	Gunsmoke	Piney Biggs	Episode: "The Scavengers"	
1970	Night Chase	Ernie Green	Television film	
1971	Night Gallery	Buckner	Episode: "The Messiah on Mott Street"	
1976	Crunch	Richard "Crunch" Blackstone	Television film	
1977	Raid on Entebbe	President Idi Amin Dada	Television film Nominated—Primetime Emmy Award for Outstanding Supporting Actor in a Miniseries or a Movie	
1980	Rage!	Ernie	Television film	
1982	A House Divided: Denmark Vesey's Rebellion	Denmark Vesey	Television film	
1983	The A-Team	Charlie "East-Side Charlie" Struthers	Episode: "The Out-of-Towners"	
1983	For Love and Honor	Sergeant James "China" Bell	Television film	
1983	Women of San Quentin	Sergeant Therman Patterson	Television film	
1983–1984	For Love and Honor	Sergeant James "China" Bell	12 episodes	
1985	Playing with Fire	Fire Chief Jim Walker	Television film	
1985	The Park is Mine	Eubanks	Television film	
1985	Badge of the Assassin	Detective Cliff Fenton NYPD	Television film	
1985	Alfred Hitchcock Presents	Convict	Episode: "Prisoners"	
1986	Harem	Agha Kislar	Television film	
1987	Desperado	Bede	Television film	
1987	In Self Defense	Lieutenant Tyrell	Television film	
1987	Perry Mason: The Case of the Scandalous Scoundrel	General Sorenson	Television film	
1987	Murder, She Wrote	Lieutenant Bradshaw	Episode: "Steal Me a Story"	
1989	Prime Target	Gilmore Brown	Television film	
1990	After the Shock	William McElroy	Television film	
1992	Chrome Soldiers	Perry Beach	Television film	
1993	It's Nothing Personal	Lieutenant Riley	Television film	
1993	The American Clock	Isaac	Television film	
1993	seaQuest DSV	Captain Jack Clayton	Episode: "Treasures of the Tonga Trench"	
1993–2000	Homicide: Life on the Street	Lieutenant Al Giardello	Nominated—NAACP Image Award for Outstanding Actor in a Drama Series (1996–1999)	
1994	The Corpse Had a Familiar Face	Detective Martin Talbot	Television film	
1994	TV Nation	Himself	Pilot episode	
1995	Deadline for Murder: From the Files of Edna Buchanan	Marty Talbot	Television film	
1997	The Defenders: Payback	Judge Williams	Television film	
1997	Law & Order	Lieutenant Al Giardello	Episode: "Baby It's You"	
2000	Homicide: The Movie	Al "Gee" Giardello	Television film	
2000	The Ride	Carter	Television film	
2001	Stiletto Dance	Captain Rick Sands	Television film	

=== Video games ===
Year	Title	Role	Notes	Ref.
2014	Alien: Isolation	Dennis Parker, Technician	Voice role; Nostromo Edition	
