= Planet Earth III =

2023 British nature documentary television series

- Genre: Nature documentary
- Presented by: David Attenborough
- Composers: Hans Zimmer; Jacob Shea; Sara Barone
- Country of origin: United Kingdom
- Original language: English
- No. of episodes: 8

Production
- Producers: Nick Easton; Will Ridgeon; Kiri Cashell; Charlotte Bostock; Sarah Whalley; Theo Webb; Fredi Devas; Steve Greenwood
- Running time: 60 minutes
- Production company: BBC Studios Natural History Unit

Original release
- Network: BBC One
- Release: 22 October – 10 December 2023

Related
- Planet Earth; Planet Earth II

Planet Earth III is a 2023 British nature documentary series produced by the BBC Studios Natural History Unit in co-production with The Open University, BBC America, ZDF, France Televisions and NHK. It is the third installment in the Planet Earth series, with Sir David Attenborough reprising his role as narrator. It premiered in the UK on 22 October 2023.

== Production ==
The BBC greenlit Planet Earth III in February 2019, alongside four other natural history productions: Seven Worlds, One Planet, A Perfect Planet, The Green Planet and Frozen Planet II. The announcement was accompanied by a BBC Earth teaser trailer to promote all five series.

The Planet Earth III team filmed in 43 countries and six continents during the five-year production. The series required 134 individual shoots, 50 of which were managed remotely due to the travel restrictions in place during the COVID-19 pandemic. Local film-making teams were directed from the UK to gather the material for the remotely-managed shoots.

The production team succeeded in using the latest technology and filming techniques, some of which were developed especially for this series. These included:

- the first ever 'onboard' view from a southern right whale using a motion camera tagged to the animal
- the development of a specially-constructed filming rig to get underwater and split-screen shots of African jacanas
- filming inside Vietnam's Hang son Doong Cave using twin drones to simultaneously illuminate and film the cave.

Rare species, behaviours and events captured on film for the first time included:

- the first footage of blue sharks feeding on a raft of flying fish eggs
- previously undocumented behaviours in treehoppers, insects native to the rainforests of Ecuador, including maternal care and a symbiotic relationship with bees
- the first extensive coverage of humpback whales trap-feeding, a new feeding behaviour first documented in 2011.

David Attenborough officially joined the production in August 2023. He appears in person to present the opening and closing episodes of the series, filmed on location at Downe Bank Nature Reserve in Kent. For the remaining episodes he provides narration.

In September 2023 the BBC released an extended trailer for Planet Earth III, with footage from the series accompanied by Attenborough's narration and the brand new song "Mother Nature". The song was a collaboration between composers Hans Zimmer and Bleeding Fingers Music, singer-songwriter RAYE, and Bastille. Zimmer, Jacob Shea, Sara Barone, producer Russell Emanuel and Bastille’s Dan Smith collaborated on the original score for Planet Earth III. A reworking of Bastille’s hit single, "Pompeii", entitled "Pompeii MMXXIII", plays over the end credits.

== Episodes ==
The series comprises eight episodes.

No.	Title	Original release date	UK viewers (millions)
1	"Coasts"	22 October 2023	7.62
This episode shows coastal habitats, starting with surfers at Shipstern Bluff in Tasmania. Juvenile seals evade great white sharks at Robberg Peninsula, similar to the episode in Planet Earth I, however, this time they are observed to form a mob and chase away a shark. Narwhals arrive to the arctic for the spring plankton bloom. Sea angels migrate to feast on other plankton, including sea butterflies. Lions at the Skeleton Coast in Namibia are observed hunting cormorants at night. A mother Southern right whale gives birth at Valdés Peninsula. In western Canada, a wandering garter snake is seen swimming for prey among the kelp. At Raja Ampat in Indonesia, archer fish shoot down insects in the mangroves, as well as jump out of the water to bite prey. Flamingoes at the Yucatan coast have difficulties nesting due to strong storms. Lastly, Raine Island, a nesting site for green turtles, is being monitored and maintained by people to ensure the continued survival of the turtles. The "making of" segment highlights the turtles on Raine Island.
2	"Ocean"	29 October 2023	5.98
In the opening shots, colorful comb jellies and the hydrozoan Halicreas are observed using submarines. While hunting, a lionfish becomes prey to the clown frogfish, which also eats dragonets. Kelp forests along the western coast of the USA serve as nurseries for horn sharks, while avoiding giant sea bass, wolf eels, hound sharks, and Broadnose sevengill sharks. Then, angel sharks lie in wait under the sand for prey, but the horn shark saves itself using its dorsal spike. Following storms, rafts of kelps become rafts for flying fish, attracting blue sharks. Many animals become caught in drifting plastic, though floating plastic becomes a home for a male Columbus crab until it finds a female drifting on a turtle. A large gathering of mobula rays becomes the target of a small group of orcas. In the deep sea, large siphonophores are found swimming. In the mesopelagic zone, Glass squid hide using their transparency. Even deeper, a gulper eel is shown gulping a mouthful. At the ocean floor, a large group of pearl octopus protect their eggs. Hydrothermal vent animals are filmed, including tube worms. Lastly, anchovies offshore of Chile are simultaneously caught by fishermen and sea lions, while sea lions jump inside the net to devour fish. The "making of" segment highlights the sea lions in the fishing nets.
3	"Deserts & Grasslands"	5 November 2023	6.22
The episode opens with shots of Guelta d'Archei. In the Namib desert, an ostrich pair alternate monitoring eggs and newly hatched chicks. In Australia, a spotted bowerbird prepares his nest for females, and gets robbed by rivals. Shifting sands and expanding deserts increase risk of dust storms that bury villages. A young mother baboon in the Erongo Region searches for water with the troupe. A leopard stakes out prey by hiding in the trees and jumping. Saiga antelope in the Eurasian Steppe compete for territory and females. A female maned wolf in the Cerrado protects her pups from brushfires. Elephant populations in Zakouma are recovering from years of ivory poaching, accompanied by recovery of the grasslands. The "making of" segment highlights the maned wolf in Brazil.
4	"Freshwater"	12 November 2023	5.67
The episode opens with divers in the Cenotes of the Yucatán Peninsula. In Costa Rica, Gliding tree frogs gather to mate following heavy rains, and deposit eggs on the backs of leaves. In southeast Sri Lanka, a mugger crocodile hides in the mud to trap spotted deer coming to drink at a pond. Rains refresh the Kalahari Desert in the Okavango delta, attracting millions of animals. A male lilytrotter teaches his hatchlings how to jump across the lilypads and avoid crocodiles. A pack of African wild dogs struggles to chase lechwe through the waters. A Livingston's cichlid fish in Lake Malawi plays dead to lure prey. On the island of Bioko, large numbers of gobies attempt to climb a 30m waterfall to breed at the top. In Pakistan, an Indus River dolphin becomes stranded in a canal, and is then rescued and transported to the river. The "making of" segment highlights the Indus dolphin.
5	"Forests"	19 November 2023	6.00
The episode opens with a person ascending up to the jungle canopy. In Borneo, a pair of oriental pied hornbills prepares to nest with a ritual catching of bats, and then seals the female into a hole in a tree trunk while she lays her eggs. In the Amazon, the many different treehoppers produce different sounds to communicate. One species summons bees to scare away an assassin bug, in exchange for honeydew. In India, dholes communicate with whistles to coordinate hunting of chital deer. A male tragopan in China tries to dance to attract females, while his stage instead gets used by a golden pheasant. In the temperate rainforest in Canada, the return of pacific salmon attracts a lone female Spirit bear. A giant kapok tree is chopped down to make way for eucalyptus monocultures, used to make paper. In Uganda, a group of chimpanzees cautiously commutes across a highway to collect fruit in human villages. The "making of" segment highlights the chimpanzees.
6	"Extremes"	26 November 2023	5.58
The episode begins with footage of the Hang Sơn Đoòng cave in Vietnam, showing a spot where sun reaches the cave floor, cave pearls, and massive stalagmites. Cavefish and cave prawns are found in the cave. In the Arctic, a pack of wolves has repeated standoffs with Musk ox, before ultimately separating one from the herd. Frogs in the French Alps emerge from under the ice to mate in a pond. Barbary macaques huddle together in the Atlas Mountains to survive the cold weather. In North America, Monarch butterflies migrate to Mexico over the winter, but many perish in seasonal storms. In the Fynbos in South Africa, forest fires destroy some of the forest, which quickly regrows. In Australia, Golden-shouldered parrot make a nest in a termite mound, also protecting the chicks from the wildfires. In Amboseli, Kenya, extended dry periods force a mother elephant to abandon her calf. In the Gobi Desert, a family of snow leopards is caught on camera. The "making of" segment highlights the Hang Sơn Đoòng cave.
7	"Human"	3 December 2023	5.41
The episode shows the interactions of animals with the human-dominated world. The opening scene shows a rhino walking through the streets of Sauraha, Nepal. At the Uluwatu Temple in Bali, long-tailed macaques steal sunglasses and phones from tourists to barter for snacks. In New York City, pavement ants collect dropped or discarded food, while avoiding pigeons. In India, a cobra hunts a toad in a populated town, and is tolerated by the villagers. In Melbourne, Australia, a frogmouth hunts for prey using streetlights, while its fledgling chick escapes being hunted by domestic cats. Black bears at Lake Tahoe rummage through garbage cans and convenience stores to fatten up for the winter. Near Vancouver Island, humpback whales use a new strategy to feed by opening their mouths and waiting for fish to mistake them for shelter. African elephants in Kenya eat crops from local farms, while farmers have to scare them away at night to protect their crops. Desert locusts swarm and devour crops. In the Amazon rainforest, a sloth narrowly escapes forest fires cleared for farming land while a porcupine is rescued from the fire. Farming innovations and reducing meat consumption would allow more space to be used for wildlife, instead of growing food for farm animals. The "making of" segment highlights the fires in the Amazon.
8	"Heroes"	10 December 2023	4.91
This episode focuses on people helping animals from going extinct. The episode begins with a black rhinoceros being tranquilized and transported via air to a sanctuary. In Ecuador, scientists working at the Centro Jambatu Research Center work to save frogs like the Morona-Santiago stubfoot toad. Then in Africa, ivory poachers are arrested in a sting operation. Then in Vienna, northern bald ibis chicks are raised by humans and released into the wild. The Amazon Rainforest is being protected by the Munduruku people, who join in protests to protect their home. But with the planet getting warmer, politicians may need to join the fight to protect our planet, like the former president of the Maldives, a country under great threat of climate change.

== Reception ==
On the review aggregator website Rotten Tomatoes, 100% of 7 critics' reviews are positive, with an average rating of 8.8/10.

Writing for The Guardian, critic Rebecca Nicholson gave the series five stars out of five, stating that "it is possible to watch and enjoy it purely for the astonishing footage – but it will horrify you, too."

Reviewing for the Financial Times, Dan Einav awarded the first episode five stars out of five, writing that "at a time when the news reveals the world to be a dark and ugly place, Planet Earth stirringly reminds us of its overwhelming beauty."

In a review for The Times, Carol Midgley awarded the series four out of five stars, calling it "magnificent, but it's a fast track to becoming really quite sad." She also noted that the crew reportedly broke their non-intervention rule to rescue trapped turtles and sea lions while filming, but considered this a positive act, writing "Good for them. Who wouldn't help a suffering creature?"

The Evening Standard reviewer Elizabeth Gregory gave the series four stars out of five, writing that the series struggles to meet the challenge of balancing "being both captivating and concerned". Gregory highlighted the shift in focus compared to the previous two Planet Earth series towards showing "how animals are adapting in extraordinary ways, to survive the new challenges they face", portraying "a sense of the magic of life on our planet – and how close we are to losing it."
