= Elizabeth Shearer White =

American film producer

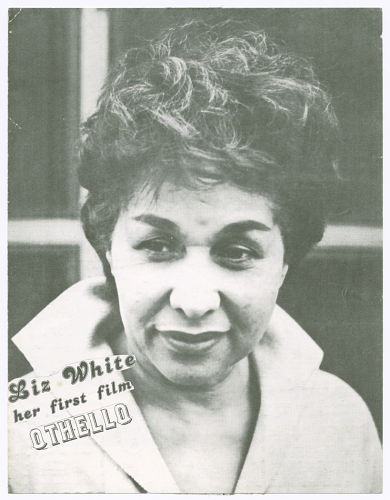

Elizabeth 'Liz' Shearer White (died 1993) was an American independent film producer and founder of the Shearer Summer Theatre in Martha's Vineyard. She is known for her stage production of Shakespeare's Othello with an all-black cast, which she eventually filmed and released as a movie in 1980 at Howard University.

White worked as an actress and dresser on Broadway before eventually returning to Oak Bluffs where she grew up. There, she formed one of the first summer theatre groups on the island featuring the African-American residents and vacationers of Oak Bluffs. The theatre group was active from 1946 up until the early 1960s.
