= Fergus Beeley =

English conservationist

- Born: 1962 (age 63–64); Tonbridge, Kent
- Occupation: Television producer

Fergus Michael Edmund Beeley (born 1962) is an English wildlife conservationist and filmmaker. He is best known for his work producing films for BBC Natural World, including "White Falcon, White Wolf"; "The Eagle Has Landed"; "Return of the Eagle Owl"; and "Spectacled Bears: Shadows of the Forest". He joined the BBC Natural History Unit in 1990 and has produced series including Planet Earth: The Future and The Life of Birds in collaboration with David Attenborough.

== Early life ==
Beeley was born in Tonbridge, Kent. In 1985, he graduated from the University of Durham (Hatfield College) with a degree in anthropology, earning a 2:2. He completed his thesis with the Pitjantjatjara tribe of Aboriginals in central Australia.

== Career ==
Beeley joined the BBC Natural History Unit in 1990 and has produced natural history programmes for television. These include the documentary series Planet Earth: The Future, The Life of Birds and PBS Nature: "Jungle Eagle".

A month before Beeley was due to depart to Ellesmere Island for filming of the documentary "White Falcon, White Wolf", he fell whilst filming high up in the Andes and was flown back to the UK by air ambulance for surgery on a broken ankle. This meant he could not be on location with the crew for filming and had to assist via GPS and edit from his hospital bed.

In 2009 Beeley spent a year in the rural Scottish Highlands on Beinn Eighe and neighbouring Loch Maree, filming the documentary "A Highland Haven".

== Conservation ==
Beeley is the creator of a community conservation project called the BLUE Campaign, which encourages anyone with access to a green space to give a piece back to nature to promote biodiversity.

== Controversies ==
In July 2017, Beeley was involved in a road rage incident in which he informed a family that he was placing them under a citizen's arrest. Beeley was filmed telling the family to "get ready to die" and that he "wanted them dead". Two claims of assault were made but neither party pursued the matter further.
