= Isla Isabel National Park =

National park in Nayarit, Mexico

Coordinates: 21°50′50″N 105°53′05″W

- IUCN category II (national park)
- Interactive map of Isla Isabel National Park
- Location: Nayarit, Mexico
- Area: 1.94 km^{2} (0.75 sq mi)
- Established: 1980
- Governing body: National Commission of Natural Protected Areas

Ramsar Wetland
- Official name: Parque Nacional Isla Isabel
- Designated: 27 November 2003
- Reference no.: 1324

Isla Isabel National Park is a national park and protected area located in Nayarit, Mexico. The park was established in 1980 and is approximately 1.94 square kilometers.
