= Planet Earth: The Future =

- Genre: Nature documentary
- Narrated by: Simon Poland
- Composers: George Fenton; David Poore
- Country of origin: United Kingdom
- Original language: English
- No. of episodes: 3

Production
- Producer: Fergus Beeley
- Running time: 60 minutes
- Production company: BBC Natural History Unit

Original release
- Network: BBC Four
- Release: 26 November – 10 December 2006

Related
- Planet Earth

Planet Earth: The Future is a 2006 BBC documentary series on the environment and conservation, produced by the BBC Natural History Unit as a companion to the multi-award-winning nature documentary Planet Earth. The programmes were originally broadcast on BBC Four immediately after the final three episodes of Planet Earth on BBC One. Each episode highlights the conservation issues surrounding some of the species and environments featured in Planet Earth, using interviews with the film-makers and eminent figures from the fields of science, conservation, politics, and theology. The programmes are narrated by Simon Poland and the series producer was Fergus Beeley.

== Background ==
When the first episodes of Planet Earth were broadcast in the UK, the producers were criticised by some green campaigners for glossing over the environmental problems faced by the planet. Executive producer Alastair Fothergill defended the approach, explaining that a heavy-handed environmental message would not work on primetime BBC One. However, the Planet Earth film crews witnessed first-hand scenes of environmental degradation and the increasing scarcity of wildlife in some of the shooting locations. This experience formed the basis of Planet Earth: The Future, which was designed to engage viewers in a mature debate about environmental issues.

The following year, the BBC commissioned Saving Planet Earth, the second overtly conservation-themed series to be shown on BBC One. The first BBC series to deal comprehensively with conservation was State of the Planet in 2000.

== Episodes ==
No.	Title	Original release date
1	"Saving Species"	26 November 2006
The first programme asks if there really is an extinction crisis facing certain species. Alastair Fothergill, executive producer of Planet Earth, admits that making the series was a bittersweet experience since some creatures were filmed with the knowledge that their continued existence is under threat. David Attenborough believes that conservation of the natural world is something that can unite humanity if people know enough about it. Cameraman Martyn Colbeck relates that every single day during a six-week African visit to film for "Jungles", he and his crew were awakened by the sound of gunshots. Poaching can quickly wipe out a population, and David Greer of the World Wide Fund for Nature explains that in 2005 his team confiscated 70 guns in the area – a 700% increase from 1999. Other featured animals at risk include the walia ibex, the snow leopard, the boto, and saiga antelope. The attack of a polar bear on a walrus colony on dry land in "Ice Worlds" was a rare occurrence. Footage from a 1997 BBC Wildlife Special shows the bears hunting smaller prey on sea ice. Species have always become extinct, but now, the viewer is told, the rate of extinction is accelerating (see Holocene extinction) and it will "really reach biblical proportions within a few decades." Mankind is urged to respect biodiversity: it is estimated that if a monetary value could be put on all that the world's ecosystems do for humanity, it would total some US$30 trillion.
2	"Into the Wilderness"	3 December 2006
The second part looks at man's potential effect on the world's areas of wilderness. As the human population has grown, only a quarter of Earth's land now remains uninhabited (aside from Antarctica). Although around 12% is protected, this may not be enough – providing such places are not just 'enclosures' and bordering territories are also managed. Ethiopia's Semien Mountains are increasingly encroached upon for farming land, and this example leads to the question of overpopulation. Some interviewees argue that it is not just about numbers: how humans consume their natural resources is also important. However, others believe that the world would be greatly more sustainable if the population level was reduced to about half its current level. Jonathon Porritt believes that this could be achieved simply: by good education on family planning. Consumption of fresh water is highlighted: there are now 40,000 more dams in existence than in 1950. The controversy over drilling for oil in the Arctic National Wildlife Refuge is discussed by both its advocates and opponents. E. O. Wilson's concept of biophilia is discussed, and David Attenborough believes that a child's innate love of wildlife, for whatever reason, is being lost in adulthood. An answer to deforestation is found in Costa Rica, where farmers are paid to allow their pasture to revert to forest for its water ecosystem services. This episode also deals with climate change and related global warming, which is now happening at a faster rate than ever before.
3	"Living Together"	10 December 2006
The last episode deals with the future of conservation. It begins by looking at previous efforts. The 'Save The Whales' campaign, which started in the 1960s, is seen to have had a limited effect, as whaling continues and fish stocks also decline. In the 1990s, as head of the Kenya Wildlife Service, Richard Leakey took on the poachers by employing armed units. Although it was successful in saving elephants, the policy was detrimental to the Maasai people, who were forced from their land. The need for "fortress" areas is questioned, and the recently highlighted Raja Ampat coral reef in Indonesia is an example. The more tourism it generates, the greater the potential for damage – and inevitable coastal construction. Sustainable development is viewed as controversial, and one contributor perceives it to currently be a "contradiction in terms". Trophy hunting is also contentious. Those that support it argue that it generates wealth for local economies, while its opponents point to the reducing numbers of species such as the markhor. Ecotourism is shown to be beneficial, as it is in the interests of its providers to protect their environments. However, in some areas, such as the Borneo rainforests, the great diversity of species is being replaced by monocultures. The role of both religion and the media in conservation is argued to be extremely important. Contributors to the programme admit a degree of worry about the future, but also optimism.

== Participants ==
The following is an alphabetical list of the interviewees featured in the series, with their titles and professions as credited on screen:

- Neville Ash, World Conservation Monitoring Centre, UN Environment Programme
- David Attenborough, broadcaster
- Ulises Blanco, farmer
- Mark Brownlow, producer, Planet Earth
- Martyn Colbeck, cameraman, Planet Earth
- James Connaughton, senior White House environmental advisor
- Huw Cordey, producer, Planet Earth
- Robert Costanza, professor of ecological economics, University of Vermont
- Ahmed Djoghlaf, executive secretary, Convention on Biological Diversity, UN Environment Programme
- Betsy Dresser, senior vice president, Audubon Nature Institute
- Johan Eliasch, entrepreneur
- Simon Evans, big game hunter
- Alastair Fothergill, series producer, Planet Earth
- David Greer, park advisor, World Wide Fund for Nature
- Chadden Hunter, wildlife biologist
- Tony Juniper, executive director, Friends of the Earth
- Peyton Knight, National Center for Public Policy Research
- Marek Kryda, consultant, Animal Welfare Institute, Poland
- James Leape, Director General, Worldwide Fund for Nature (WWF International)
- Moisés Léon, Tropical Science Center
- Mark Linfield, producer, Planet Earth
- James Lovelock, independent scientist and proponent of the Gaia hypothesis
- Barbara Maas, chief executive, Care for the Wild International
- Professor Wangari Maathai, founder, Green Belt Movement
- Richard Mabey, writer
- Jeffrey A. McNeely, chief scientist, World Conservation Union
- Nisar Malik, conservationist
- Tony Martin, Natural Environment Research Council
- Professor Robert M. May, University of Oxford
- E.J. Milner-Gulland, Imperial College London
- Russell Mittermeier, president, Conservation International
- Henry Ndede, chairman, Friends of Nairobi National Park, Kenya
- Craig Packer, ecologist
- Martin Palmer, chief executive, Alliance of Religions and Conservation
- Roger Payne, president, Ocean Alliance
- Jonathon Porritt, chair, Sustainable Development Commission, UK
- Sandra Postel, author and global water analyst
- Mark Stanley Price, chief executive, Durrell Wildlife Conservation Trust
- Carlos Quesada, University of Costa Rica
- Adam Ravetch, cameraman & Arctic wildlife specialist
- M. Sanjayan, Lead Scientist, The Nature Conservancy
- Clare Short, former Secretary of State for International Development
- Sakana Ole Turede, chair, Kitengela Pastoral Land Owners Association, Kenya
- Jan Kees Vis, director of sustainable agriculture, Unilever
- Robert Watson, chief scientist, World Bank
- Rowan Williams, Archbishop of Canterbury
- E. O. Wilson, professor Emeritus, Harvard University

== DVD and book ==
- All three episodes of Planet Earth - The Future are included as a bonus feature on the fifth disc of the British and North American versions of the Planet Earth DVD box set (BBCDVD1883 in the UK). It was omitted from the HD DVD and Blu-ray sets because of the mixture of standard and high-definition footage.
- An accompanying book, Planet Earth - The Future: What the Experts Say (ISBN 978-0-563-53905-6), was published by BBC Books on 5 October 2006. The editors are Rosamund Kidman-Cox and Fergus Beeley, and Jonathon Porritt wrote the foreword.

== See also ==
- Planet Earth, the television series which spawned Planet Earth: The Future
- Earth, the associated feature film released in 2007
- Saving Planet Earth, a BBC series highlighting the plight of endangered species broadcast in 2007
- Media coverage of climate change
- Effects of global warming
