= The Blue Planet =

2001 British nature documentary television series

- Also known as: The Blue Planet: Seas of Life
- Genre: Nature documentary
- Narrated by: David Attenborough
- Composer: George Fenton
- Country of origin: United Kingdom
- Original language: English
- No. of episodes: 8

Production
- Executive producer: Alastair Fothergill
- Running time: 50 minutes
- Production company: BBC Natural History Unit

Original release
- Network: BBC One
- Release: 12 September – 31 October 2001

Related
- Blue Planet II; Blue Planet III; Blue Planet (franchise); Planet Earth; Frozen Planet

The Blue Planet is a British nature documentary series created as a co-production between the BBC Natural History Unit and Discovery Channel. It premiered on 12 September 2001 in the United Kingdom. It is narrated by David Attenborough.

Described as "the first ever comprehensive series on the natural history of the world's oceans", each of the eight 50-minute episodes examines a different aspect of marine life. The underwater photography included creatures and behaviour that had previously never been filmed.

The series won a number of Emmy and BAFTA TV awards for its music and cinematography. The executive producer was Alastair Fothergill and the music was composed by George Fenton. Attenborough narrated this series before presenting the next in his Life series of programmes, The Life of Mammals (2002), and the same production team created Planet Earth (2006).

A sequel series, Blue Planet II, was aired on BBC One in 2017.

== Background ==
The series took almost five years to make, involving nearly 200 filming locations. The fact that most of the ocean environment remains a mystery presented the production team with many challenges. Besides witnessing some animal behaviours for the first time, the crew also observed some that were new to science. The producers were helped by marine scientists all over the world with state-of-the-art equipment.

Blue whales – whose migration routes were previously unknown – were located by air, after some of the animals had been given temporary radio tags. The camera team spent three years on standby, using a microlight to land on the water nearby when they finally caught up with the creatures in the Gulf of California. The open ocean proved more difficult and over 400 days were spent in often unsuccessful filming trips. After six weeks, the crew chanced upon a school of spinner dolphins, which in turn led them to a shoal of tuna. Off Mexico, the behaviour of a flock of frigatebirds guided the cameramen to a group of sailfish and marlin: the fastest inhabitants of the sea. Near the coast of Natal in South Africa, the team spent two seasons attempting to film the annual sardine run, a huge congregation of predators such as sharks and dolphins, that assembles to feast on the migrating fish by corralling them into "bait balls". Meanwhile, in Monterey Bay, orca were documented attacking gray whales and killing a calf. Filming in the deep ocean required the use of special submersibles. One of them enabled the crew to dive over a mile into the San Diego trench, where the carcass of a 40-ton gray whale had been placed to attract a large variety of scavengers.

When first transmitted on BBC One, over 12 million people watched the series and it regularly achieved an audience share of over 30%.

In 2018 a newly-discovered species of phytoplankton (Syracosphaera azureaplaneta) was named by scientists in honour of the programme, and in recognition of David Attenborough's contribution to promoting wider understanding and awareness of the oceanic environment.

== Episodes ==
"Our planet is a blue planet: over seventy per cent of it is covered by the sea. The Pacific Ocean alone covers half the globe. You can fly across it non-stop for twelve hours and still see nothing more than a speck of land. This series will reveal the complete natural history of our ocean planet, from its familiar shores to the mysteries of its deepest seas."

— David Attenborough, from episode one

No.	Title	Original release date	UK viewers (millions)
1	"Introduction"	12 September 2001	12.01
Sunset over the Pacific Ocean The opening episode shows how ocean life is regulated around the globe by currents and the varying position of the Sun. Near a Pacific seamount, there is a large concentration of marine animals because when the current makes contact with the submerged rock, it forces upwards plankton and other organisms. This in turn attracts other fish to the area that are higher up the food chain, like tuna, and those that are higher still, such as silky sharks. Off South Africa, a similar situation occurs every June when sardines migrate and are pursued by a caravan of various predators. The South Atlantic waters are the roughest, and storms also churn up nutrients to the surface. These feeding grounds have led to the world's largest albatross breeding colony, on Steeple Jason Island, west of the Falklands. Phytoplankton forms the basis of all sea life, and every night some 1,000 million tonnes of creatures ascend from the deep to search for food. Lunar phases can also have a bearing on events and the mass arrival of ridley sea turtles on a Costa Rican beach is shown. Herring initiate the most productive food chain, providing sustenance for humpback whales, and Steller's and California sea lions. In addition, their eggs are nutrition for many, both above and in the sea. Along the coast of California, a migrating gray whale and her calf are targeted by a pod of orcas, who hunt down and kill the calf. This episode won an Emmy Award for "Outstanding Cinematography for Non-Fiction Programming". George Fenton's work in this episode won another Emmy for "Outstanding Music Composition for a Series (Dramatic Underscore)".
2	"The Deep"	19 September 2001	11.51
This episode explores the unknown depths of the ocean. Over 60% of the sea is more than a mile deep and it forms the planet's most mysterious habitat. A sperm whale descends 1,000 metres to look for food and is followed, with the Johnson Sealink submersible. On the way down, a number of unusual creatures are witnessed, such as transparent squid and jellies, whose photophores give pulsating displays of colour. In such dark places, both being able to see (or sense movement) and the means of quick concealment are equally desirable. To that end, some use bioluminescence as a means of detecting food or evading predators. A descent to the very bottom of the ocean – some 4,000 metres – reveals life even at such cold temperatures, much of it new to science. It is dominated by echinoderms that sweep the sea bed; however, there are occasional large hunters, such as chimaera. In addition, sixgill sharks can grow up to eight metres in length and have remained unchanged for 150 million years. They are described as "living fossils" and relatively little is known about them. The remains of a gray whale are filmed being consumed by hagfish, a sleeper shark, probably a Greenland sleeper or a Pacific sleeper and the submersible involved in filming this is DSV Alvin, which is the same submersible that Robert Ballard used in 1986 to explore the wreck of the Titanic, as acrylic sphere submersibles cannot reach that depth. As the continental slope flattens out, it joins the abyssal plain, which can form huge trenches. At seven miles, the deepest is the Mariana Trench, and fish have been found there right down to the very bottom. Attenborough remarks that more is known about the surface of the Moon. Species captured on film for the first time include the Dumbo octopus and the hairy anglerfish. This episode was nominated for two Emmy Award for Outstanding Sound Editing and Outstanding Sound Mixing in the non-fiction category. It was also nominated for a BAFTA TV award for Best Innovation.
3	"Open Ocean"	26 September 2001	10.98
Manta ray The third instalment focuses on life in the "marine deserts": seas that are furthest from land. Such waters contain the swiftest and most powerful of ocean hunters. A feeding frenzy is shown, as striped marlin, tuna and a sei whale (later identified as a Bryde's whale) pick off a shoal of sardines until all within it have been consumed. Manta rays also gather to eat the eggs of spawning surgeonfish. Accumulations of plankton correspond to ocean 'boundaries' and consequently, schools of fish seek them out. This in turn attracts predators, and a sailfish is filmed on the attack. The only escape for smaller fish is to put as much distance between them and their pursuers as possible. Bluefin tuna are able to heat their bodies and so can hunt in colder conditions than the others of their species. Off the coast of New Zealand, an undersea volcano has formed an island and the nearby currents sweep many kinds of creatures to it, again creating huge feeding grounds. Another Pacific seamount is surrounded by hammerhead sharks, but not to seek food: they are there to allow other fish to clean them of parasites. However, others that are on the lookout for prey arrive in vast numbers. A large pod of common dolphins is too big to feed all at once and so splits up into smaller expeditions. One of these ends up near the Azores with a shoal of mackerel in its sights, but they have to compete for their quarry with an attendant flock of shearwaters and a group of adult yellowfin tuna.
4	"Frozen Seas"	4 October 2001	12.10
Polar bear This episode compares oceanic life in the Arctic and Antarctica. The winter in these regions brings temperatures of minus 50 °C and frozen seas that create the biggest challenge. However, there are polynyas in the Arctic, which are free of ice owing to the pressure of currents on either side, and such places do provide refuge for some species, like the walrus and the bowhead whale. A pod of belugas is shown: their movements are limited to a single hole in the ice – therefore putting them at risk of attack from polar bears. Everything changes with the arrival of summer, when melting ice brings a variety of migratory visitors. At the other end of the planet, in the Antarctic, winter is even more harsh, but emperor penguins and Weddell seals stay throughout. Under the sea ice, krill shrink in size and revert to their juvenile form in order to save energy. Chinstrap penguins overwinter to the north, beyond the ice, but return during the spring to breed. Having managed to get ashore, they have to walk a great distance to find a nest site, and the most favoured is Zavodovski Island, an active volcano whose warmth keeps ice from forming. Further south, as the sea ice breaks up, humpback and minke whales appear, their target the abundant krill. The leopard seal is the Antarctic's top predator. It is most effective underwater, and emperor penguins propel themselves at speed through its territory. Nonetheless, it almost invariably makes a kill.
5	"Seasonal Seas"	10 October 2001	9.75
Grey seals The fifth instalment surveys the effects of the seasons on the world's temperate seas – the most productive on Earth. Sable Island near Nova Scotia boasts the largest colony of grey seals, which breed there when the weather is at its worst. The pups remain marooned for weeks until the spring, when they are strong enough to swim. Spring also heralds the bloom of phytoplankton: it provides food for copepods, and they in turn are prey to jellyfish, which assemble in vast, million-strong swarms. On the Californian coast, giant kelp also flourishes and by summer, grows at the rate of a metre a day. It provides a sanctuary for shoals of fish and sea otters, the latter anchoring themselves to the seaweed when resting and keeping its grazers in check by eating them. Late summer in Alaska sees Pacific salmon heading inshore to breed. However, the level of their favoured river is too low and they are forced to wait in the open sea, where they fall prey to a salmon shark. The early autumn near Vancouver Island, and the temperature drops slowly. There, the last of the year's baby herring become the focus for a feeding frenzy by diving auks and murres, and marauding rockfish. Pacific white-sided dolphins also inhabit these waters and, when not hunting nocturnally, socialise during the day. As winter arrives in the north, adult herring seek shelter but are hunted by orca, which club the fish with their tails to subdue them by creating waves of pressure.
6	"Coral Seas"	17 October 2001	9.80
Schooling reef fish Coral reefs, which are so crowded that they play host to a perpetual battle for space, even among the coral itself. It starts life as a larva that becomes a polyp. Having multiplied, it hardens into a limestone skeleton and grows to form a reef. As the community flourishes, animals develop relationships with one another and such a place can feature a huge variety of ocean life. Although corals feed nocturnally on plankton, sunlight is vital because even though they are animals, each contains millions of single-celled algae. This in turn is the favoured sustenance of the humphead parrotfish, whose jaws are so powerful that it erodes much of the reef into fine sand. Algae also grows on the top of the reef and a battle for grazing rights between shoals of powder blue and convict tangs is shown, the former being initially overwhelmed by the latter's weight of numbers before regaining the upper hand. The night-time hunting of a marbled ray alerts other predators and a group of whitetip reef sharks moves in, from which few are safe. Several breeding strategies are examined, including the acrobatic habits of brown surgeonfish and the colourful courtship of the flamboyant cuttlefish. Humpback whales are visitors to the reef and males establish their seniority by the loudness and strength of their song. Being fixed to the seabed, corals must synchronise their reproduction with lunar phases and the rising spring temperatures.
7	"Tidal Seas"	24 October 2001	10.35
Tidal bore at Fundy Bay The penultimate episode deals with marine life that is structured around the rising and falling tides. These are caused by the gravitational pull of the orbiting moon, but in some locations, this can also combine with the power of the sun to create a tidal bore. The world's largest tides are to be found in the Bay of Fundy in Nova Scotia and therefore it is a rich feeding ground. A school of finback whales is closely shadowed by a flock of Cory's shearwaters. However, they only have a limited time to feed before low tide, when they must retreat and other creatures appear. Elsewhere, some of the latter include sand bubbler crabs, bears (which feed on shellfish) and a snail species that can 'surf', and some sand lances being preyed on by dogfish sharks. The extreme spring tides allow opportunists to forage further, and raccoons are shown tackling a red rock crab. Some larger fish that hunt on the seabed, such as nurse sharks and stingrays, are forced to sit and wait until there is sufficient water in which to swim. A giant horse conch is shown devouring a tulip snail, and hermit crabs battle over its vacant shell. The varying water levels are no obstacle to tarpon: they can breathe air. This enables them to inhabit stagnant areas and hunt in them. The autumn equinox combines with a hurricane off the Bahamas to create a much higher tide than is usual, flooding large parts of the coast. When the sea recedes, it leaves behind salt: food for brine shrimps and the perfect habitat in which flamingos can breed.
8	"Coasts"	31 October 2001	9.97
Waved albatrosses on Galapagos Islands The final episode examines the world's coastal environments, "the most dynamic of all ocean habitats". The perils of living in such places are highlighted by marine iguanas on the Galápagos Islands, whose diet of seaweed is quickly grabbed between crashing breakers. Many shores provide sites in which to breed or lay eggs. Apart from birds, turtles are among other major species to do so, and the mass emergence of flatbacks on Crab Island in Australia is reduced by predatory night herons, pelicans and other hunters. Each year, four million seabirds, comprising fourteen species, return to the island of Talan in eastern Russia to nest. By ensuring that all their chicks eventually leave at the same time, they lessen the impact of predators. The rough seas of the Southern Ocean play host to penguins, and a group of them is shown being pursued by an aggressive bull sea lion. The planet's coldest seas are in Antarctica, and on South Georgia each spring, thousands of southern elephant seals arrive to breed. A pair of males is shown fighting a bloody battle to control a harem of females, and Attenborough states that these fights, which are rarely fatal, can go on for 20 minutes or longer. In Patagonia, the social nature of sea lions is shown as they establish colonies, each of them several hundred strong. While in some respects it is an ideal location for the growing young, high tide brings danger for the colony as a pod of orcas habitually goes on the attack. After intentionally grounding themselves to catch their prey, the orcas return to the sea with their quarries to 'play' with them, before ultimately consuming their kills.
Specials	"Deep Trouble"	28 October 2001	N/A
Scientists believe many species that are eaten every day are now seriously threatened. Most people have no idea where the fish they buy come from let alone how endangered they might be. As fish stocks dry up, supermarkets are now offering new and strange species from the deep sea. Bizarre-looking creatures are being dragged up in vast fishing nets from depths of 1,000 metres or more. The methods used to catch them are horrifying. As the nets drag along the sea bed they rip up 100-year-old corals and sponges, destroying the habitat. So even these new species may not be available for long.
Specials	"Making Waves"	11 November 2001	N/A
The making of The Blue Planet.

== Merchandise ==
=== DVD and Blu-ray ===
The series was available as a 3-disc DVD set (BBCDVD1089, released 3 December 2001 and re-released in 2003), including interviews with the production team, a photo gallery and three additional programmes:

- Making Waves: the making of The Blue Planet (50 mins)
- Deep Trouble: an ecological documentary (50 mins)
- Blue: a five-minute theatrical short

The first DVD has now been superseded by a 4-disc Special Edition (BBCDVD1792, released 3 October 2005), which has three extra programmes:

- The Abyss
- Dive to Shark Volcano
- Amazon Abyss

In the US, there is a 4-disc Collector's Set edition (Released 2002), including 8 featurettes, interviews, photo galleries and one additional programmes:

- Deep Trouble: an ecological documentary (50 mins)

In the US, there is also a 5-disc Special Edition (BBC040754, released 6 May 2008). It contains the same features as the US 4-disc versions, but includes a fifth disc containing four special presentations:

- Amazon Abyss: discover an array of creatures living in the Amazon
- Dive to Shark Volcano: venture to Cocoa Island, an underwater volcano
- Beneath the Tides: explore an estuary in winter
- Antarctica

BBC released a 3-disc The Blue Planet: Seas of Life on Blu-ray on 9 April 2013. It contains the featured presentations as well as a third disk containing interviews, behind-the-scenes footage and five special presentations:

- Amazon Abyss
- Dive to Shark Volcano
- Beneath the Tides
- Antarctica
- Deep Trouble.

=== Books ===
The accompanying book, The Blue Planet: A Natural History of the Oceans by Andrew Byatt, Alastair Fothergill and Martha Holmes (with a foreword by David Attenborough), was published by BBC Worldwide on 27 September 2001 (ISBN 0-563-38498-0).

The companion volume for the US market of the same book was published by Dorling Kindersley (DK) and released in 2002 (ISBN 0-789-48265-7).

== Film ==
Deep Blue is a 2003 nature documentary film that is a theatrical version of The Blue Planet. Alastair Fothergill and Andy Byatt are credited as directors, and six cinematographers are also credited. The film was premiered at the San Sebastian Film Festival in Spain on 20 September 2003. It screened in more than 20 territories from 2003 to 2005 and grossed over $30 million at the box office.

== Live concert tour ==
The Blue Planet was turned into a theatrical presentation entitled The Blue Planet Live! which toured the UK from 2006 to 2008. The UK live shows were presented by World Class Service Ltd. George Fenton conducted the Manchester Camerata Orchestra in Manchester, Newcastle and Nottingham during December 2006, in three critically acclaimed shows. The tour continued in April 2007, again conducted by Fenton, in London, Cardiff, Birmingham and returning to Manchester and Nottingham.

For the show, some of the most spectacular sequences from the series have been edited together and are displayed on a huge screen (18 metres wide and 3 storeys high). The presentation is introduced by a special guest.

The tour continued in April 2008 with dates at Wembley Arena, Nottingham Arena, Manchester Central, Cardiff St. David's and Birmingham Symphony Hall.

The Blue Planet Live! continues to be staged:

- on 7 May 2010 at the Morsani Hall of the Straz Center for the Performing Arts in Tampa, Florida performed by the Florida Orchestra and conducted by Ward Stare.
- in July 2011 in the Mann Center for the Performing Arts in Philadelphia performed by the Russian National Orchestra, narrator Jane Pauley
- in June 2012 in Singapore performed by the Singapore Symphony Orchestra
- in December 2014 in Abu Dhabi at Corniche performed by the National Symphony Orchestra
- on 22 January 2015 in London at Royal Festival Hall, as a part of the Philharmonia at the Movies series.

== Sequel ==
In February 2017, the BBC announced a seven-part sequel had been commissioned, titled Blue Planet II, with Sir David Attenborough returning as narrator and presenter. The sequel debuted on BBC One, BBC One HD and BBC Earth channel on 29 October 2017.

== Overseas ==
The series was sold to over 50 countries. In the United States, it was shown as The Blue Planet: Seas of Life with the episodes in a different order, the first one being retitled "Ocean World". The series was shown on the Discovery Channel and narrated by Pierce Brosnan.

== Awards and nominations ==
Year	Award	Category	Nominee	Result	Ref.
2002	Television Critics Association Awards	Outstanding Achievement in Movies, Miniseries and Specials	The Planet Earth	Nominated	
2002	Primetime Creative Arts Emmy Awards	Outstanding Cinematography for a Nonfiction Program	Doug Allan, Simon Carroll, Bob Cranston, Mike deGruy, Yuri Farrant, Tom Fitz, Mark Wolf, Simon King, Charles Maxwell, Ian McCarthy, Didier Noirot, Michael Pitts, Rick Rosenthal, Peter Scoones and Paul Stewart (for "Seas of Life: Ocean World")	Won	
2002	Primetime Creative Arts Emmy Awards	Outstanding Music Composition for a Series (Dramatic Underscore)	George Fenton (for "Seas of Life: Ocean World")	Won	
2002	Primetime Creative Arts Emmy Awards	Outstanding Picture Editing for a Nonfiction Program	Martin Elsbury (for "Ocean World")	Nominated	
2002	Primetime Creative Arts Emmy Awards	Outstanding Sound Editing for a Nonfiction or Reality Program (Single or Multi-Camera)	Lucy Rutherford (for "The Deep")	Nominated	
2002	Primetime Creative Arts Emmy Awards	Outstanding Sound Mixing for a Nonfiction or Reality Program (Single or Multi-Camera)	Graham Wild (for "The Deep")	Nominated	
2002	British Academy Television Awards	Best Factual Series or Strand	The Blue Planet	Won	
2002	British Academy Television Awards	Innovation	The Blue Planet	Nominated	
2002	British Academy Television Craft Awards	Best Original Music	George Fenton	Won	
2002	British Academy Television Craft Awards	Best Editing: Factual	Jo Payne, Tim Coope, Alan Hoida, Martin Elsbury	Nominated	
2002	British Academy Television Craft Awards	Best Photography: Factual	Camera Team	Won	
2002	British Academy Television Craft Awards	Best Sound: Factual	Sound Team	Nominated	
2002	Royal Television Society Programme Awards	Science & Natural History	The Blue Planet	Nominated	
2002	Royal Television Society Craft & Design Awards	Lighting, Photography & Camera - Photography, Documentary/Factual and Non-Drama Productions	Camera Team	Won	
2002	Royal Television Society Craft & Design Awards	Tape and Film Editing - Documentary & Factual	Martin Elsbury, Jo Payne, Tim Coope, Alan Hoida	Won	

== Reception and criticism ==
Looking at The Blue Planet's broader cultural impact, Wheatley (2004) assessed how the middle-to-upper-class public label the series as "quality television": aspects such as its high-end camerawork, George Fenton's fully orchestral score, and graceful pacing with an emphasis on cinematic footage and reserved editing. In addition, the use of a prominent British voice and a huge international audience support another perceived marker of "quality": capacity for British cultural export. With less narration than older Attenborough series, The Blue Planet appeared to be designed as a vehicle for spectacular images and music rather than straightforward education. For example, the study noted a scene involving multiple species of jellyfish, framed as mysterious visual marvels, with the narration providing minimal elaboration and no names for the species shown on screen. The essay concludes that the most well-received qualities of The Blue Planet are unique or even contradictory relative to British television as a whole, and therefore it may not be an appropriate example in discussions of "quality television".

The series attracted some criticism when it was revealed that footage of breeding lobsters was filmed at an aquarium in Wales. The series producer, Alastair Fothergill, said that around 2% of the whole series was filmed in tanks at aquariums. A BBC spokesman argued that it would have been unethical to actually disturb the breeding process of wild lobsters for one of the scenes, which was why they made the decision to use the aquarium footage.
