= 2017 British Academy Television Craft Awards =

Technical achievements in TV awards ceremony

18th British Academy Television Craft Awards
- Date: 23 April 2017
- Site: The Brewery, London
- Hosted by: Stephen Mangan

Highlights
- Most awards: The Crown, Planet Earth II, National Treasure, The Night Manager (2)
- Most nominations: Planet Earth II (9)

Television coverage
- Network: BBC One

The 18th Annual British Academy Television Craft Awards were presented by the British Academy of Film and Television Arts (BAFTA) on 23 April 2017. For the fifth consecutive year, Stephen Mangan was the ceremony's host. The awards were held at The Brewery, City of London, and given in recognition of technical achievements in British television of 2016. Planet Earth II led the nominations with nine. The Crown, Planet Earth II, National Treasure and The Night Manager won two awards each.

== Winners and nominees ==
Winners are listed first and highlighted in boldface.

Special Award

- **Bobby Warans**

| Best Breakthrough Talent | Best Director - Fiction |
|---|---|
| **Mahalia Belo** (director) – **Ellen**; Sarah Quintrell (writer) – Ellen; Phoebe Waller-Bridge (writer and creator) – Crashing and Fleabag; Vinay Patel (writer) – Murdered by My Father | **Marc Munden** – **National Treasure**; Euros Lyn – Damilola, Our Loved Boy; Stephen Daldry – The Crown; Susanne Bier – The Night Manager |
| Best Director - Factual | Best Director - Multi-Camera |
| **James Bluemel** – **Exodus: Our Journey to Europe**; Anna Hall – Behind Closed Doors; Daniel Gordon – Hillsborough; Peter Beard – Gender Clinic: Kids on the Edge | **Chris Power** – **Ant & Dec's Saturday Night Takeaway**; Nikki Parsons – Strictly Come Dancing; Nikki Parsons – The Centenary of the Battle of the Somme; Pete Andrews – Wimbledon 2016 |
| Best Writer - Comedy | Best Writer - Drama |
| **Stefan Golaszewski** – **Mum**; Julia Davis – Camping; Phoebe Waller-Bridge – Fleabag; Steve Coogan, Neil Gibbons, Rob Gibbons – Alan Partridge's Scissored Isle | **Sally Wainwright** – **Happy Valley**; Levi David Addai – Damilola, Our Loved Boy; Peter Morgan – The Crown; Simon Nye – The Durrells |
| Best Make Up and Hair Design | Best Production Design |
| **San Junipero (Black Mirror)** – **Tanya Lodge**; Victoria – Nic Collins; Tracey Ullman's Show – Vanessa White, Floris Schuller, Neill Gorton; War & Peace – Jacqueline Fowler | **War & Peace** – **Chris Roope**; The Crown – Martin Childs; Rillington Place – Pat Campbell; The Night Manager – Tom Burton, Barbara H. Skelding |
| Best Special, Graphic and Visual Design | Best Costume Design |
| **The Crown** – **One of Us, Molinare**; Playtest (Black Mirror) – Justin Hutchinson-Chatburn, Framestore, Glassworks, Baseblack; Sherlock: The Abominable Bride – Real SFX, Milk VFX, Kevin Horsewood; The Last Dragonslayer – Milk VFX, Chris Reynolds, Adam McInnes; War & Peace – Bluebolt, Jens Doeldissen, Simone Grattarola; The Night Manager – Bluebolt, Pau Costa Moeller | **The Crown** – **Michele Clapton**; The Durrells – Charlotte Holdich; The Hollow Crown – Nigel Egerton; San Junipero (Black Mirror) – Susie Coulthard |
| Best Photography – Factual | Best Photography and Lighting – Fiction |
| **Planet Earth II (for "Cities")** – **John Aitchison, Rob Whitworth, Mark MacEwen**; Planet Earth II (for "Deserts") – John Shier, Jonathan Jones, Barrie Britton; Planet Earth II (for "Mountains") – John Shier, Mateo Willis, Barrie Britton; Planet Earth II (for "Jungles") – Tom Crowley, Mark MacEwen, John Brown | **Rillington Place** – **James Friend**; The Crown – Adriano Goldman; National Treasure – Ole Birkeland; Nosedive (Black Mirror) – Seamus McGarvey |
| Best Editing – Factual | Best Editing – Fiction |
| **Hillsborough** – Andy Worboys; Planet Earth II (for "Deserts") – Dave Pearce; Planet Earth II (for "Islands") – Matt Meech; Exodus: Our Journey to Europe – Simon Sykes, Nick Fenton, Sunshine Jackson | **The Night Manager** – **Ben Lester**; Fleabag – Gary Dollner; National Treasure – Luke Dunkley; Sherlock: The Abominable Bride – Andrew John McClelland |
| Best Digital Creativity | Best Entertainment Craft Team |
| **David Attenborough's Great Barrier Reef Dive** – **Alchemy VR**; Attenborough's Story of Life App – Matt Walker, Ben Gonshaw, Ewa Headley, Tristan Leaver; HUM∀NS – Production team; 2016 Summer Paralympics – Sunset + Vine, Deltatre, Live Wire, Golden Egg Innovation | **Bernie Davis, David Cole, Kevin Duff, Patrick Doherty** – **Royal British Legion Festival of Remembrance 2016**; Kevin Duff, Howard Nock, Tony Freeman, Nick Collier – The Queen's 90th Birthday Celebration; Karen Bruce, Patrick Doherty, Mark Kenyon, Mark Busk-Cowley – Ant & Dec's Saturday Night Takeaway; David Newton, Mark Kenyon, Jason Gilkison, Vicky Gill – Strictly Come Dancing |
| Best Sound – Factual | Best Sound – Fiction |
| **Planet Earth II (for "Cities")** – **Graham Wild, Kate Hopkins, Tim Owens**; Forces of Nature with Brian Cox – John Rogerson, Jay Price, Laurie Goode, Andy Paddon; Planet Earth II (for "Jungles") – Kate Hopkins, Graham Wild; Olympic Opening Ceremony 2016 – Sound Team | **The Night Manager** – **Aitor Berenguer, Howard Bargroff, Alex Sawyer, Adam Armitage**; Sherlock: The Abominable Bride – John Mooney, Douglas Sinclair, Howard Bargroff, Jon Salmon-Joyce; The Missing – Sound Team; War & Peace – Chris Ashworth, Lee Walpole, Stuart Hilliker, Jeff Richardson |
| Best Original Television Music | Best Titles and Graphic Identity |
| **National Treasure** – **Cristobal Tapia de Veer**; Poldark – Anne Dudley; Planet Earth II – Hans Zimmer, Jacob Shea, Jasha Klebe; War & Peace – Martin Phipps | **Paralympics 2016** – **Richard Norley, Lee Jacobs, Callum O'Reilly**; The Durrells – Alex Maclean; The Night Manager – Patrick Clair, Raoul Marks; The Crown – Patrick Clair, Raoul Marks |

== See also ==
- 2017 British Academy Television Awards
