= Strike: An Uncivil War =

2024 documentary film

- Film poster
- Directed by: Daniel Gordon
- Cinematography: Michael Timney
- Edited by: Kevin Konak
- Music by: Tim Atack
- Release date: 2024
- Running time: 111 minutes
- Language: English

Strike: An Uncivil War is a 2024 documentary film from director Daniel Gordon about the Battle of Orgreave, which took place during the 1984–1985 United Kingdom miners' strike. As well as interviews, the film makes use of archival footage from the Northeast Film Archive, the Yorkshire Film Archive, the NUM, as well as footage recorded by a miner "who went to Orgreave on the day and filmed with a little VHS camcorder".

Prior to its general release the film was screened at the 2024 Sheffield DocFest documentary film festival, where it was awarded that year's 'Audience Choice' award.
