= Planet Earth II =

2016 British nature documentary television series

- Genre: Nature documentary
- Presented by: David Attenborough
- Composers: Hans Zimmer; Jasha Klebe; Jacob Shea
- Country of origin: United Kingdom
- Original language: English
- No. of episodes: 6

Production
- Executive producers: Vanessa Berlowitz, Mike Gunton, James Brickell, Tom Hugh-Jones
- Running time: 60 minutes
- Production company: BBC Natural History Unit

Original release
- Network: BBC One
- Release: 6 November – 11 December 2016

Related
- Planet Earth; Planet Earth III; Blue Planet II

Planet Earth II is a 2016 British nature documentary series co-produced by the BBC Natural History Unit, BBC Studios, BBC America, ZDF, France Télévisions and Tencent, and distributed by BBC Worldwide. It functions as a sequel to Planet Earth, which was broadcast in 2006. The series is presented and narrated by Sir David Attenborough with the main theme music composed by Hans Zimmer.

Announced in 2013, Planet Earth II is the first television series produced by the BBC in ultra high definition (4K), and set out to utilise new filmmaking technologies that had been developed since the first series.

The first trailer was released on 9 October 2016, and the series premiered on 6 November 2016 in the United Kingdom on BBC One and BBC One HD. It aired internationally on BBC Earth and other networks.

The series received universal critical acclaim, with many reviewers commending the use of new filmmaking technology and declaring it among the best nature documentaries of all time. It won two Television Awards and two Television Craft Awards from the British Academy of Film and Television Arts, and two Primetime Emmy Awards.

A sequel titled Planet Earth III aired in 2023.

== Production ==
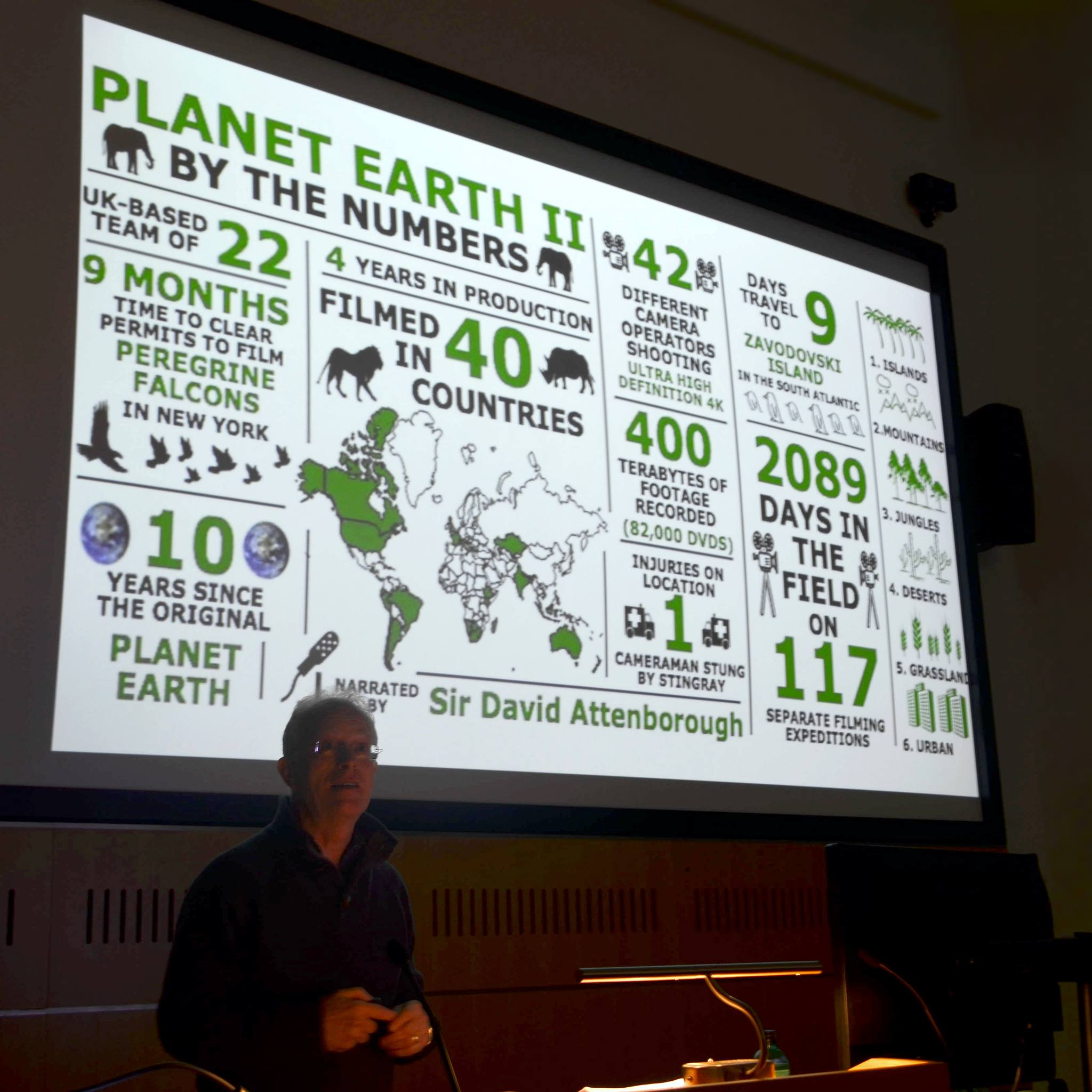
Executive producer Mike Gunton presenting about the series at the University of Cambridge

The series was announced by the BBC in 2013 with the working title One Planet, but the title was later changed to Planet Earth II.

The BBC trailer for the series used the same music featured in the trailer for the original Planet Earth, "Hoppípolla" by Icelandic post-rock band Sigur Rós.

The original Planet Earth, airing in 2006, was one of the first natural documentary series to be made in high definition (HD) and Planet Earth II utilised new technologies developed since the first series, including ultra high definition (4K), improved camera stabilisation, remote recording and aerial drone technology.

== Broadcast ==
=== British television ===
The premiere of Planet Earth II took place at Bristol's Cinema de Lux on 2 November 2016 with special guest appearance by Attenborough. Bristol has been the global home of BBC's Natural History programme making for almost 60 years. The series debuted on BBC One and BBC One HD the following Sunday (6 November) from 8 p.m. to 9 p.m. Each of the six episodes included a 10-minute making-of documentary called Planet Earth II Diaries. The previous week's episode was repeated in an earlier time slot the following Sunday.

=== International ===
The series was broadcast internationally on BBC Earth channel with a few exceptions for some countries.

The series aired in Belgium on the Flemish channel Canvas, narrated in Dutch by Vic De Wachter, with episodes airing each Wednesday from 7 December 2016. In the Netherlands the series is airing on the Dutch channel NPO 1, narrated by Peter Drost, with episodes airing each Sunday from 1 January 2017.

In Japan, the series aired on NHK—with four special episodes aired on 23 December 2016 and concluded on 19 February 2017, while all the six original episodes were broadcast from 29 March 2017 until 6 May 2017.

In Australia, the series premiered on 15 February 2017 on the Nine Network. As for New Zealand, it aired from 9 July 2017 at Prime channel.

The series debuted in Canada and the United States on 18 February 2017, with the Canadian broadcast on the local BBC Earth channel (which recently launched). In the United States, the series premiered with a three-network simulcast across BBC America, AMC and SundanceTV (owned by AMC Networks, who manages BBC America on behalf of BBC Worldwide). The series and Planet Earth was available to stream on Netflix until December 2, 2019.

In Israel, the series premiered on 20 May 2017 on the new public broadcasting network KAN 11.

In the Philippines, the series premiered on 17 June 2018 on GMA Network through its version Amazing Earth for the first season.

In Greece, all the six original episodes were broadcast daily from 12 April until 17 April 2020 at 9:30 p.m. on the free-to-air television network Skai TV.

In India, all the episodes are available for streaming through Amazon Prime. All the episodes are also available in Discovery Plus.

== Episodes ==
The series comprises six episodes plus the compilation episode "A World of Wonder". Official episode viewing figures are from BARB. The first episode gained 12.26 million viewers in the United Kingdom, which broke the record for the highest under the current system of viewing figures for a nature documentary.

"It's been ten years since we explored these wonders in the first series of Planet Earth, and since then much has changed. We can now show life on our planet in entirely new ways; bring you closer to animals than ever before and reveal new wildlife dramas for the very first time. But that is not all; the planet has changed too. Never have our wildernesses been as fragile and as precious as they are today. At this crucial time for the natural world we will journey to every corner of the globe; to explore the greatest treasures of our living planet, and reveal the extreme lengths animals go to to survive."

— David Attenborough's opening words

No.	Title	Produced by	Original release date	UK viewers (millions)
1	"Islands"	Elizabeth White	6 November 2016	12.26
The first episode illustrates the wildlife settlement of coastal islands, in which thousands of them worldwide where animals struggle for survival reflects challenges for all life on Earth. Somewhere on the island of Escudo off the coast of Panama, a male pygmy three-toed sloth heard the distant mating call as he swims across the shallow mangrove seas in search of a lone female. On the Komodo island of Indonesia, male Komodo dragons compete with each other to earn the sole mating right. Isolated from the continent of Africa, Madagascar provides a home to several species of lemurs which include giant endangered indris, a troop of ring-tailed lemurs, small bamboo lemurs, and leaping sifakas. At the Fernandina Island of the Galápagos, a newly hatched marine iguana miraculously escapes the onslaught of predatory Galapagos racers before climbing to the cliff top for safety. From the sub-Antarctic of New Zealand inhabited by thousands of birds, Snares penguins perform their sub-breeding season, shearwaters fly off to collect food for their young, and a male Buller's albatross tries to find a female to mate. A female white tern from Seychelles nestles her egg on a bare branch and incubates it while Brown noddies settles their nest on a pisonia tree. A Seychelles fody consumes the tern's egg and the young noddy is entangled by the pisonia's seeds. Located on the Indian Ocean, Christmas Island is infested with numerous species of crabs, including a cast of million Christmas Island red crabs as they migrate across the island to reach the feeding shore. Some are attacked by a swarm of invasive yellow crazy ants. Millions of chinstrap penguins settle on the isolated volcanic Zavodovski Island in the South Atlantic Ocean, enduring hostile environments such as extreme mass waves, violent storms, ravaging skuas, and noxious volcanic gases. The mother penguin guards her chicks against the skuas while her partner returns to their nesting place with food after his fifty-mile journey from fishing before she switches places. The Planet Earth II Diaries explains the teams' one-year expedition camp on Zavodovski Island while filming penguins before they departed from harsh weather.
2	"Mountains"	Justin Anderson	13 November 2016	13.14
The second episode starts with the Himalayas where endangered snow leopards roam across the range for survival. Across the steep sun-baked mountains of the Arabian Peninsula, Nubian ibexes settles on the steepest cliff to raise their young while avoiding predators. The ibexes climb down the slope to drink while the kids learn to evade Arabian red foxes. A female golden eagle glides 100 miles across the Alps slopes in a single day to find food in winter before spotting fox carrion, infested with scavenging crows, that can sustain her days. However, the carrion attracts other eagles forcing her to continue her search. Meanwhile, thousands of avalanches from the Rocky Mountains occur every year resulting in catastrophic effects of debris; grizzly bears make their dens for hibernation at 10,000 feet in the deep snow of leeward slope. In spring, a mother bear and her cubs descend into the valley in search of food and to evade avalanche debris. As marmots make warning calls, the bears scratch themselves on trees, marking their scents before they continue their foraging. Winter in the Rockies will reach at least -54 °C after the creation of diamond dust. A bobcat leaves its territory to hunt and finds a suitable valley where the river does not freeze and volcanic hot springs where other animals have arrived to feed. From the equator of Africa lies the snowy Mount Kenya which is 30 degrees colder than the African savanna, and is also the home of giant heathers, Lobelias, and groundsels growing on the upper slope as they adapt hot summer day and freezing night. As the sun rises on the Andes of Bolivia, southern viscachas settle at the sun's ray to get warm while the largest colonies of Andean flamingos are trapped in the icy alkali lake at night as they struggle to break free. But as the sun gets hotter, the viscachas retreat towards the shade, and the flamingoes who are immune to the sun's heat start parading across the lake for breeding. Human activities and climate changes start to affect the mountainous ecosystem, resulting in infrastructure buildings in the Alps, shortening hibernation seasons in the Rockies, and melting glaciers in the Andes, including snow decline in the Himalayas. Somewhere in the Himalayas, the mother snow leopard fends off against two male leopards while protecting her adolescent cub, resulting in her injuries. After months of recovery, the mother ventures off across the Himalayan slopes on her own while departing her cub, who is now old enough to fend for herself. The narrator states that they will soon be reunited before facing their time alone. The Planet Earth II Diaries reveals the team's exploration of the Alps while filming golden eagles. The teams use paragliders to follow the eagles' flight pattern while wearing a helmet camera to focus on the eagles' perspective. Due to unpredictable weather and mountainous terrains, the paragliders face difficult obstacles of avoiding peaks and clouds before they safely land.
3	"Jungles"	Emma Napper	20 November 2016	11.60
The third episode introduces the jungle ecosystem that covers less than 6% of the earth's surface, where plants and animals live. An indri roams across the jungles of Madagascar while facing the competition of survival based on niche. High up on the treetops in Guatemala, a curious young spider monkey gets stuck and is rescued by her father. A young Draco lizard searches for ants on a tree but a larger male challenges him, to which the young male chooses to glide to safety. Three hundred years ago, a giant hura tree began to grow taller as it races to absorb water and sunlight for survival, which it carries 1,000 other plants within its branches. Hundreds of hummingbird species in Ecuador compete with each other to feed nectar. Sword-billed hummingbirds avoid competition with other hummingbirds by using their long beaks to reach the nectar in the deepest flowers which are inaccessible to the other hummingbirds. The rainforest trees provide transpiration as the moisture vaporizes causing rainfall, and supporting all life. Deep in the Amazon rainforest of Brazil, the trees are suddenly submerged from flooding caused by seasonal rainfall while Araguaian river dolphins, a newly discovered species, use their sonars to hunt in the murky waters. Even though the rainfall causes mass flooding, the jungle provides abundant food within a shallow margin for large animals that thrive through lush vegetation like the mighty jaguar, which ambushes and kills a caiman. Deep in the jungle, animals provide camouflage and mimicry to help evade predators, such as a leaf-tailed gecko which disguises itself as lichen. A male glass frog from Costa Rica fiercely protects his eggs from predatory wasps. Some of the newly hatched tadpoles escape by falling into the stream below. At night, insects glow to search for mates while fungi use bioluminescent light to attract insects like click beetles to disperse their spores. A railroad worm hunts millipedes by turning off its bioluminescence light and deceive it. In Papua New Guinea, several male red birds-of-paradise perform their mating dance to attract females on the canopy while a solitary Wilson's bird-of-paradise seeks his mate on the forest floor by furbishing his display court and enacting his colorful display. Back in Madagascar, the family of indris gather together as they sing to deter other indris from their territory in which the narrator specifies that the Jungle is their sanctuary and their protection for all life on Earth. The Planet Earth II Diaries reveals that the jungle is the least explored place to visit for simple reasons. The teams' exploration of Brazil took them five weeks of finding the rare Araguaian river dolphins while filming them both on the surface and underwater.
4	"Deserts"	Ed Charles	27 November 2016	11.88
The fourth episode focuses on deserts which cover one-third of the planet as plants and animals perform survival strategies. A pride of Desert lions of Namibia attempt to hunt a herd of gemsbok and a giraffe. In the American West, thunderstorms arrive after two months of drought causing multiple floods. Million years ago, the formation of slot canyons and mountain-type canyons were the results of ravage floodwaters and soil erosions, making them one of the most iconic landscapes on the planet. In the Sonoran Desert of Arizona, cacti are able to store water within their stems and sport spines for defense. Harris's hawks, however, are able to perch on cactus spines while hunting round-tailed ground squirrels in packs. The loggerhead shrike or butcherbird hangs its prey on the cactus's spines for storage. Amongst the driest deserts in Peru, plants began to flourish due to seasonal changes which provide a land of opportunity for all life. In south-west Madagascar, billion swarm of migratory locusts, affected by heavy rainfall, began to flourish from breeding as they savagely infest the entire area of farmlands and consume mass amounts of vegetation. In the arid shrublands of the Kalahari Desert, herds of plains zebras and desert elephants gather at a waterhole to drink after their long migration. Male sandgrouse fly 120 miles every morning to provide water for their families. They can soak up water in their breast feathers, but also have to escape the talons of a gabar goshawk. At the Mojave Desert during July, a herd of wild mustangs gather at a waterhole, in which the lead stallion tries to assert its dominance before his confrontation by his newly rival. Standing on the scorching dunes, a shovel-snouted lizard raises each foot off the ground one at a time to cool itself. At night, a nocturnal golden mole stalks across the sand dunes to locate termites with its hearing. In the Negev desert of Israel, a desert long-eared bat hunts on the ground, defeating a venomous deathstalker scorpion after a short confrontation. At dawn, fog from the Atlantic coast is blown over to the dunes of Namib desert, creating a source of moisture which causes the darkling beetles to extract it and attract predators such as the neighboring Namib web-footed gecko and a hungry Namaqua chameleon. The Planet Earth II Diaries reviews the teams' two-week encounter with migratory locusts in Madagascar which were easy to find but elusive for filming. With the UN's Food and Agriculture Organization's and localist aid, the team manage to film both the swarms of nymphs and the winged adults.
5	"Grasslands"	Chadden Hunter	4 December 2016	11.54
The penultimate episode focuses on grasslands that cover one-quarter of Earth's land. At the Terai–Duar savanna and grasslands in India, the tallest grassland in the world, herds of Indian elephants plow through tall grasses providing an open area for other large animals to roam during seasonal change. During spring, herds of endangered saiga antelope migrate across Eurasian Steppe in search of fresh grass while two newly born twins are left hidden in the grass waiting for their mother's nourishment. During the rainy season, thunderstorms occur rapidly in grassland which became more sporadic for forests to thrive allowing the grasses to grow annually for rainfall. In Botswana, the flooded rainwater from the storm transforms the grassland into the lush Okavango Delta. Within the delta, A pride of lions, however, find it more challenging to run down their prey in flooded areas of the delta as they attempt to hunt an African buffalo. A female Eurasian harvest mouse leaves her nest as she treks across the meadows foraging for food until she escapes a barn owl's grasp before she returns home safely to her offspring. In the African savannah, southern carmine bee-eaters struggle to catch insects hidden within grass while a kori bustard and ostriches provide lack of support. While flying in front of a bull African bush elephant, the bee-eaters gain a perfect opportunity to grab their prizes before the dry season begins. During the dry season, the grasslands begin to wither providing less food for the herbivores, while specialised predators find another opportunity. A serval uses her large ears to detect prey like Southern African vlei rats. In the Serengeti, herds consisting of millions of blue wildebeest migrate across the savanna in pursuit of rain along with Jackson's widowbirds, not only to seek food but to mate. A male widowbird tears off grasses to create an even surface and a centerpiece stage to attract females while facing competition with rivals. Leafcutter ant colonies in South America continuously harvest vast amounts of grasses to furnish their horticulture with fungi providing enough nutrients to feed for the entire colony. In northern Australia, colonies of compass termites build multiple giant mounds that serve as a compass facing the north-south axis, which also protects them from mass flooding and extreme heat. On the plains of South America, a giant anteater digs up a termite mound and consumes 2,000 of them a day. As fire ravages the grassland, the grass stems survive underground and continue to recover before raining season. In the prairies of North America during winter, American bison wrestle with starvation and endure frigid conditions as they shovel thick snow for buried grasses while a red fox finds a vole hidden within the snow. In the Arctic tundra during spring, 500 miles from the prairies, female caribous migrate to the north to give birth as the calves learn to sprint and gallop while joining their mothers for their ongoing migration. Unaware the danger the herds are heading to, a pack of Arctic wolves ambush them and one of the wolves manages to separate a calf but the calf uses its stamina to outrun the wolf before rejoining the herd. As the caribous travel onward to find their feeding ground, the narrator speculates that the grassland provides a great gathering of wildlife on Earth. The Planet Earth II Diaries reveal the teams' exploration in Kaziranga of North India, using hidden camera traps to avoid their encounter with Indian elephants, water buffalos, Bengal tigers and Indian rhinoceros while filming them.
6	"Cities"	Fredi Devas	11 December 2016	11.10
The last episode focuses on the urban environment as animals struggle to contend with their coexistence with humans. In Jodhpur, a bachelor gang of gray langurs jump across the rooftops to compete with an alpha male as he successfully expels them from his territory. Aftermath, they settle on the sacred temple garden which serves as a feeding ground for them and peaceful coexistence with Hindus resulting in increased breeding. Peregrine falcons settle on the highest perches in New York City as they soar across the street to hunt down pigeons. At night, an Indian leopard prowls across the streets of Mumbai as it stalks on feral urban pigs. During the hot summer of Rome, a flock of one million common starlings gather in the evening after feeding as they return to their roosting tree while performing aerobatic murmurations. While building a bower for glamour to impress a female, a male great bowerbird settles on the golf course of Townsville to collect man-made objects for support as it raids the rival's collection before being deceived. During springtime in Toronto, a family of urban raccoons settle in the chimney for warmth as they explore urban areas while searching for their new home, under their mother's supervision. A troop of rhesus macaques settles in the crowded marketplace of Jaipur, as they raid food from the market. At night, a clan of competitive spotted hyenas ventures into the walled city of Harar which they provide a traditional coexistence with the Harari people during their 400 years of feeding carcasses and leftovers. Pigeons gather at the river near Albi to preen their feathers before they are ambushed by a wels catfish, a species that was introduced in the area since the 1970s. As cities began to expand, they also provide electricity resulting in light pollution that affect wildlife activities. On the coastline of Barbados at night, endangered hawksbill sea turtle hatchlings used their instinct to follow the moonlight before reaching the sea while others wander aimlessly into the city streets because of the confusion of city lights. Unlike other cities that decimated wildlife, there are other urban areas that cope with nature's coexistence. In Milan, residents present a solution to support nature by building urban forestation like the Bosco Verticale that contains more than 900 trees. In Singapore, two million trees have been planted over 45 years in urban areas, including the Supertree Grove in Gardens by the Bay, which are home to several exotic ferns and vines among other plants. It is also a suitable settlement for wildlife, such as smooth-coated otters. The episode ends with David Attenborough standing at the top of The Shard in London discussing the future for all life on Earth. The Planet Earth II Diaries shows the teams' work in Jaipur while filming rhesus macaques raiding marketplaces.
–	"A World of Wonder"	Elizabeth White	1 January 2017	12.02
A compilation of the wildlife series presented by David Attenborough

"Now, over half of us live in an urban environment. My home, too, is here, in the city of London. Looking down on this great metropolis, the ingenuity with which we continue to reshape the surface of our planet is very striking. But it's also sobering. It reminds me of just how easy it is for us to lose our connection with the natural world. Yet, it's on this connection that the future of both humanity and the natural world will depend. And surely, it is our responsibility to do everything within our power to create a planet that provides a home not just for us, but for all life on Earth."

— David Attenborough, in closing

== Reception ==
=== Critical reception ===
On the review aggregator website Rotten Tomatoes, 100% of 28 critics' reviews are positive, with an average rating of 9.7/10. The website's consensus reads: "Planet Earth II offers a spectacular, moving, unprecedented account of the natural world."

The Independent's Christopher Hooton said of the series: "It is undoubtedly the greatest TV nature documentary to date and there's a strong case for it being one of the best TV series full stop." Michael Hogan from The Telegraph compared this series to the original Planet Earth series and said that "advances in technology have enabled intimate high-definition close-ups and gasp-inducing aerial shots" and said "It has become predictable to heap superlatives upon the BBC Natural History Unit and wax lyrical about Attenborough's status. But both institutions should be treasured while we're lucky enough to still have them." Gerard O'Donovan gave the series 5 out of 5 stars in The Telegraph, calling it "one of the most stunningly vivid and engaging natural history films I've ever seen".

In The New York Times, Neil Glenzinger said "nature photography has rarely been as spectacular as it is in Planet Earth II." The Hollywood Reporter's Tim Goodman called the series a "truly sublime accomplishment, an epic achievement that everyone should watch".

Several outlets particularly highlighted the racer snake and marine iguana sequence from "Islands" as a memorable highlight of the series.

However, The Guardian's Martin Hughes-Games, while calling the series "spectacular and fascinating", accused programmes such as this of breeding complacency about the destruction of wildlife by painting a misleading picture of the planet. He wrote that series such as Planet Earth had "become a disaster for the world's wildlife" and that while world animal populations are decreasing, "the producers [of this show] continue to go to the fast shrinking parks and reserves to make their films—creating a beautiful, beguiling fantasy world".

Planet Earth II initially held the top position on IMDb's Top 250 TV Shows, which was called a "substantial achievement" by The Independent. As of 2024, it is ranked second on this list. The Guardian listed the series as the best television show of 2016 and in 2019 ranked it along with the first Planet Earth series 72nd on a list of the 100 best TV shows of the 21st century.

=== Awards and nominations ===
Year	Award	Category	Nominee	Result	Ref.
2017	British Academy Television Awards	Huw Wheldon Award for Specialist Factual	Planet Earth II	Won	
2017	British Academy Television Awards	Virgin's Must-See Moments	Snakes vs. Iguanas chase	Won	
2017	British Academy Television Craft Awards	Best Photography: Factual	John Aitchison, Rob Whitworth, Mark MacEwen (Episode: "Cities")	Won	
2017	British Academy Television Craft Awards	Best Photography: Factual	John Shier, Jonathan Jones, Barrie Britton (Episode: "Deserts")	Nominated	
2017	British Academy Television Craft Awards	Best Photography: Factual	John Shier, Mateo Willis, Barrie Britton (Episode: "Mountains")	Nominated	
2017	British Academy Television Craft Awards	Best Photography: Factual	Tom Crowley, Mark MacEwen, John Brown (Episode: "Jungles")	Nominated	
2017	British Academy Television Craft Awards	Best Editing: Factual	Dave Pearce (Episode: "Deserts")	Nominated	
2017	British Academy Television Craft Awards	Best Editing: Factual	Matt Meech (Episode: "Islands")	Nominated	
2017	British Academy Television Craft Awards	Best Sound: Factual	Graham Wild, Kate Hopkins, Tim Owens (Episode: "Cities")	Won	
2017	British Academy Television Craft Awards	Best Sound: Factual	Kate Hopkins, Graham Wild (Episode: "Jungles")	Nominated	
2017	British Academy Television Craft Awards	Best Original Television Music	Hans Zimmer, Jacob Shea, Jasha Klebe	Nominated	
2017	TCA Awards	Outstanding Achievement in News and Information	Planet Earth II	Nominated	
2017	Primetime Creative Arts Emmy Awards	Outstanding Documentary or Nonfiction Series	Planet Earth II	Won	
2017	Primetime Creative Arts Emmy Awards	Outstanding Cinematography for Nonfiction Programming	Cinematography team (Note: John Aitchison, Rob Whitworth, Kevin Flay, Mark MacEwen, Gordon Buchanan, Gavin Thurston, Mateo Willis, Michael Kelem, Mark Smith, Sandesh Kadur) (Episode: "Cities")	Nominated	
2017	Primetime Creative Arts Emmy Awards	Outstanding Cinematography for Nonfiction Programming	Cinematography team (Note: Mark MacEwen, Max Hug Williams, Jonathan Jones, Mateo Willis, Richard Wollocombe, Pete McCowen, Warwick Sloss, Paul Stewart, Derek Frankowski, John Shier, Tom Fitz) (Episode: "Islands")	Won	
2017	Primetime Creative Arts Emmy Awards	Outstanding Directing for Nonfiction Programming	Fredi Devas (Episode: "Cities")	Nominated	
2017	Primetime Creative Arts Emmy Awards	Outstanding Directing for Nonfiction Programming	Elizabeth White (Episode: "Islands")	Nominated	
2017	Primetime Creative Arts Emmy Awards	Outstanding Music Composition for a Series (Original Dramatic Score)	Jacob Shea and Jasha Klebe (Episode: "Islands")	Nominated	
2017	Primetime Creative Arts Emmy Awards	Outstanding Picture Editing for a Nonfiction Program	Dave Pearce (Episode: "Cities")	Nominated	
2017	Primetime Creative Arts Emmy Awards	Outstanding Picture Editing for a Nonfiction Program	Matt Meech (Episode: "Islands")	Nominated	
2017	Primetime Creative Arts Emmy Awards	Outstanding Sound Editing for Nonfiction Programming (Single or Multi-Camera)	Kate Hopkins, Tim Owens (Episode: "Cities")	Nominated	
2017	Primetime Creative Arts Emmy Awards	Outstanding Sound Mixing for a Nonfiction Program (Single or Multi-Camera)	Graham Wild (Episode: "Cities")	Nominated	
2017	Royal Television Society Craft & Design Awards	Editing - Documentary / Factual	Production Team	Nominated	
2017	Royal Television Society Craft & Design Awards	Photography - Documentary / Factual & Non Drama	Production Team	Won	
2017	Royal Television Society Craft & Design Awards	Sound - Entertainment and Non-Drama	Production Team	Nominated	
2017	Royal Television Society Craft & Design Awards	Judges' Award	Production Team	Won	
2018	Royal Television Society Awards	Science & Natural History	Planet Earth II	Won	

== Merchandise ==
=== DVD and Blu-ray ===
In the UK, the series was released as a two-disc DVD or Blu-ray set on 5 December 2016, while a four-disc 4K UHD Blu-ray + Blu-ray set was released later on 13 March 2017. These releases were distributed by BBC Worldwide.

In the US and Canada, the DVD, Blu-ray, and 4K UHD Blu-ray sets were released on 28 March 2017 and distributed by BBC Worldwide Americas. Each of the six episodes includes the 10-minute segment of the making-of documentary Planet Earth II: Diaries that had followed the original broadcast of each episode.

In Australia and New Zealand, the DVD, Blu-ray and 4K UHD Blu-ray sets were released by ABC DVD/Roadshow Entertainment on 29 March 2017.

=== Books ===
An accompanying hardback book was written by Steven Moss with a foreword by David Attenborough and published by BBC Books (ISBN 978-1849909655). It was released on 6 October 2016 in the UK, and on 15 February 2017 for the US release.

== Soundtrack ==
Planet Earth II

Soundtrack album by Hans Zimmer, Jasha Klebe, Jacob Shea
- Released: 11 November 2016 (Digital); 2 December 2016 (Audio CD)
- Genres: Soundtrack, Classical music
- Length: 2:13:09
- Label: Silva Screen Records
- Producers: BBC Worldwide; BBC Earth

Hans Zimmer, Jasha Klebe, Jacob Shea chronology
Planet Earth (2006)	Planet Earth II (2016)

The soundtrack was released with a compilation of the incidental music specially commissioned for Planet Earth II. The main theme was composed by Hans Zimmer, with the original music for each episode composed by Jacob Shea and Jasha Klebe for Bleeding Fingers Music. A digital soundtrack was released worldwide on 11 November 2016, while a two-disc soundtrack became available on 2 December 2016 in the UK.

=== Track listing ===
DISC 1

No.	Title	Episode Title	Length
1.	"Planet Earth II Suite"		4:31
2.	"The Sloth"	"Islands"	3:40
3.	"Home to Dragons"	"Islands"	5:00
4.	"Albatross Dance"	"Islands"	4:00
5.	"Racer Snakes vs. Iguanas"	"Islands"	4:59
6.	"Chinstrap Penguins"	"Islands"	3:20
7.	"Singing Indri"	"Jungles"	2:41
8.	"Competing Hummingbirds"	"Jungles"	3:11
9.	"Life in the Canopy"	"Jungles"	2:41
10.	"Jungle Weather"	"Jungles"	1:40
11.	"Night Crawlers"	"Jungles"	1:59
12.	"World of Bioluminescence"	"Jungles"	2:50
13.	"Wilson's Bird-of-Paradise"	"Jungles"	3:28
14.	"Something Worth Protecting"	"Jungles"	2:16
15.	"Life Without Water"	"Deserts"	2:39
16.	"Monsoon Deserts – Canyonlands"	"Deserts"	3:19
17.	"Lions vs. Giraffe"	"Deserts"	3:30
18.	"The Butcher Bird"	"Deserts"	1:07
19.	"Wild Horses"	"Deserts"	2:44
20.	"Desert Nightlife – Golden Mole"	"Deserts"	3:39
21.	"Long-Eared Bat vs. Scorpion"	"Deserts"	3:12
22.	"Early Morning Fog"	"Deserts"	2:53
Total length:			69:19

DISC 2

No.	Title	Episode Title	Length
1.	"Roof of the World"	"Mountains"	0:52
2.	"Peaks of North America"	"Mountains"	1:59
3.	"The Ibex"	"Mountains"	1:40
4.	"The Himalayas"	"Mountains"	2:16
5.	"Flight Over Alps"	"Mountains"	2:17
6.	"Ice Skating Flamingos"	"Mountains"	1:18
7.	"Dancing Bears"	"Mountains"	1:38
8.	"Tenacious Bobcat"	"Mountains"	1:54
9.	"Garden of Ice"	"Mountains"	2:04
10.	"Snow Leopards"	"Mountains"	5:14
11.	"Savage Beauty"	"Mountains"	1:43
12.	"Nomadic Life"	"Grasslands"	1:57
13.	"Hunting Buffalo Herds"	"Grasslands"	4:16
14.	"The Okavango"	"Grasslands"	1:39
15.	"Carmine Bee Eaters"	"Grasslands"	2:40
16.	"Industrious Insects"	"Grasslands"	3:38
17.	"The Great Migration"	"Grasslands"	5:45
18.	"The Unnatural Habitat"	"Cities"	1:16
19.	"Langurs of Jodhpur"	"Cities"	2:35
20.	"Temple Gardens"	"Cities"	2:10
21.	"Market Thieves"	"Cities"	3:10
22.	"Illuminated"	"Cities"	1:31
23.	"City Skylines"	"Cities"	1:27
24.	"Starlings"	"Cities"	1:52
25.	"Toronto Raccoons"	"Cities"	2:52
26.	"We are the Designers"	"Cities"	2:48
27.	"Epilogue"	"Cities"	1:19
Total length:			63:50
