= Billion Dollar Heist =

- Directed by: Daniel Gordon, Brendan Donovan, Bryn Evans
- Written by: Whetham Allpress, Tom Blackwell, Brendan Donovan, Bryn Evans, Matthew Metcalfe
- Starring: Misha Glenny Rakesh Asthana
- Release date: 2023
- Running time: 84 minutes
- Country: New Zealand
- Language: English

Billion Dollar Heist is a 2023 feature-length documentary that explores the 2016 Bangladesh Bank robbery.

The bank robbery is described by multiple film reviewers as "one of the biggest financial crimes in history". The film is slightly dramatized, and compares the hackers to the hackers in Ocean's Eleven. The film mixes expert commentary with visualizations to explain the abstract and technical process of hacking to the viewer in simple terms. One film reviewer described the interviewees as having unique and excited demeanors that make this film stand out from other documentaries. The original bank robbery was a major cyber crime, and this film and its telling of it emphasize to the viewer the dangers of a digitally interconnected world.
