= Spotted hyenas in Harar =

Spotted hyena inhabitation in Harar, Ethiopia

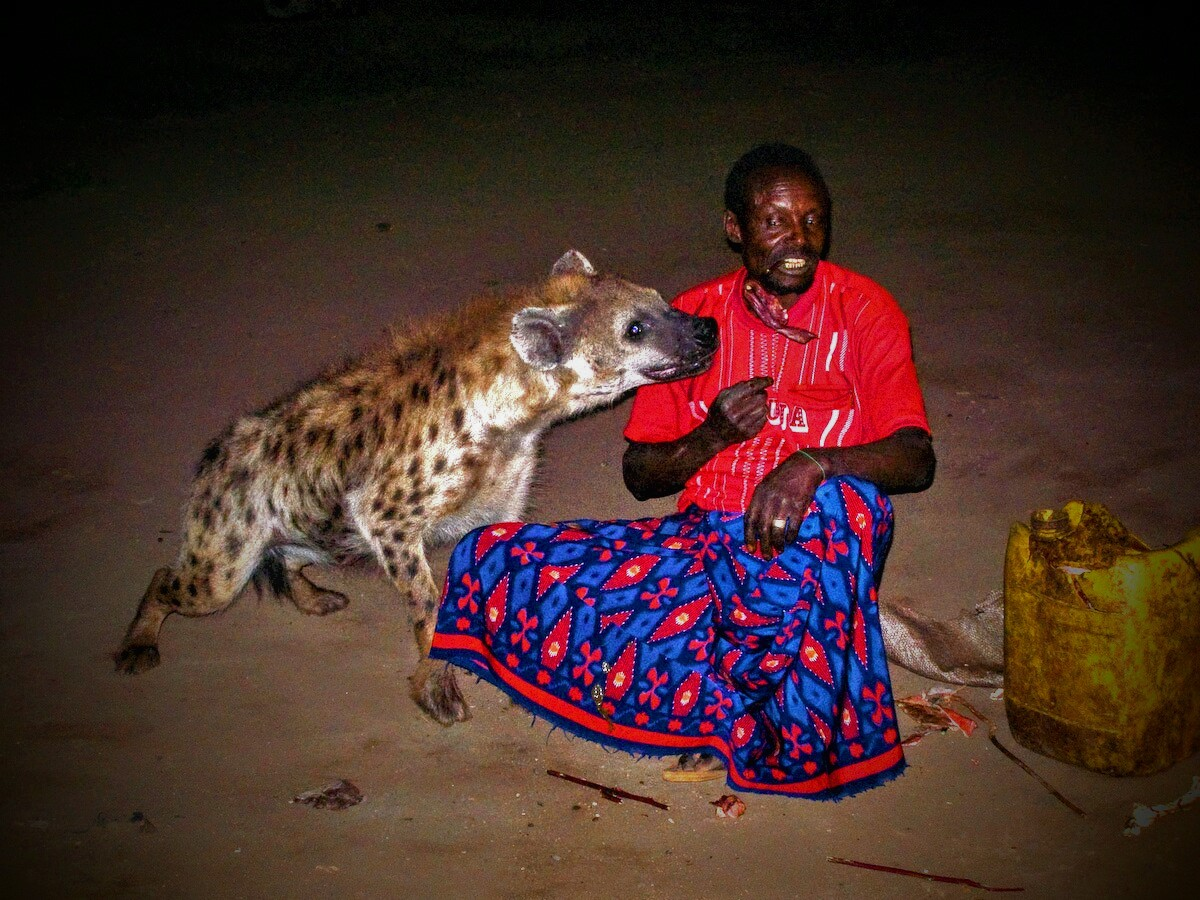
One of the "hyena men" feeding a spotted hyena.

Written records indicate that spotted hyenas have been present in the walled Ethiopian city of Harar for at least 500 years, where they sanitise the city by feeding on its organic refuse.

The practice of regularly feeding them did not begin until the 1960s. The first to put it into practice was a farmer who began feeding the hyenas in order to stop them from attacking his livestock, with his descendants having continued the practice.

== As tourist attraction ==
Some of the hyena men give each hyena a name they respond to, and call to them using a "hyena dialect,” a mixture of English and Oromo. The hyena men feed the hyenas by mouth, using pieces of raw meat provided by spectators. Tourists usually organise to watch the spectacle through a guide for a negotiable rate. As of 2002, the practice was on the decline, with only two practicing hyena men left in Harar.

== Folklore ==
According to local folklore, the feeding of hyenas in Harar originated during a 19th-century famine, during which the starving hyenas began to attack livestock and humans. In one version of the story, a pure-hearted man dreamed of how the Hararis could placate the hyenas by feeding them porridge, and successfully put it into practice, while another credits the revelation to the town's Muslim saints convening on a mountain top. The anniversary of this pact is celebrated every year on the Day of Ashura, when the hyenas are provided with porridge prepared with pure butter. It is believed that during this occasion, the hyenas' clan leaders taste the porridge before the others. Should the porridge not be to the lead hyenas' liking, the other hyenas will not eat it, and those in charge of feeding them make the requested improvements. The manner in which the hyenas eat the porridge on this occasion are believed to have oracular significance; if the hyena eats more than half the porridge, then it is seen as portending a prosperous new year. Should the hyena refuse to eat the porridge or eat all of it, then the people will gather in shrines to pray, in order to avert famine or pestilence.

== In media ==
The hyena men are featured in the last episode Cities of the documentary series Planet Earth II by David Attenborough.
