= 69th Primetime Creative Arts Emmy Awards =

2017 American television programming awards

- Date: September 9–10, 2017
- Location: Microsoft Theater; Los Angeles, California
- Presented by: Academy of Television Arts & Sciences
- Most awards: Saturday Night Live; Stranger Things; Westworld (5)
- Most nominations: Saturday Night Live (16)

Television/radio coverage
- Network: FXX

The 69th Primetime Creative Arts Emmy Awards honored the best in artistic and technical achievement in American prime time television programming from June 1, 2016, until May 31, 2017, as chosen by the Academy of Television Arts & Sciences. The awards were presented across two ceremonies on September 9 and September 10, 2017, and was broadcast by FXX on September 16. The nominations were announced on July 13, 2017. The ceremony is in conjunction with the annual Primetime Emmy Awards and is presented in recognition of technical and other similar achievements in American television programming, including guest acting roles.

== Winners and nominees ==
Winners are listed first and highlighted in bold:

=== Governors Award ===
- **ITVS**

=== Programs ===
Programs
**Outstanding Structured Reality Program**: **Shark Tank (ABC)**; Antiques Roadshow (PBS); Diners, Drive-Ins and Dives (Food Network); Fixer Upper (HGTV); Lip Sync Battle (Spike); Who Do You Think You Are? (TLC)	**Outstanding Unstructured Reality Program**: **United Shades of America (CNN)**; Born This Way (A&E); Deadliest Catch (Discovery Channel); Gaycation (Viceland); Intervention (A&E); RuPaul's Drag Race: Untucked (VH1)
**Outstanding Variety Special**: **Carpool Karaoke Primetime Special 2017 (CBS)**; Full Frontal with Samantha Bee Presents Not the White House Correspondents’ Dinner (TBS); Louie C.K. 2017 (Netflix); Sarah Silverman: A Speck of Dust (Netflix); Stephen Colbert's Live Election Night Democracy's Series Finale: Who's Going to Clean Up This Shit? (Showtime)	**Outstanding Informational Series or Special**: **Leah Remini: Scientology and the Aftermath (A&E)**; Anthony Bourdain: Parts Unknown (CNN); Inside the Actors Studio (Bravo); StarTalk with Neil deGrasse Tyson (Nat Geo); Vice (HBO)
**Outstanding Documentary or Nonfiction Series**: **Planet Earth II (BBC America)**; 30 for 30 (ESPN); American Masters (PBS); Chef's Table (Netflix); The Keepers (Netflix)	**Outstanding Documentary or Nonfiction Special**: **13th (Netflix)**; Amanda Knox (Netflix); The Beatles: Eight Days a Week (Hulu); A House Divided (HBO); L.A. Burning: The Riots 25 Years Later (A&E)
**Outstanding Animated Program**: **Bob's Burgers: "Bob Actually" (Fox)**; Archer: "Archer Dreamland: No Good Deed" (FX); Elena and the Secret of Avalor (Disney Channel); The Simpsons: "The Town" (Fox); South Park: "Member Berries" (Comedy Central)	**Outstanding Short-Format Animation**: **Adventure Time: "Islands Part 4: Imaginary Resources" (Cartoon Network)**; Disney Mickey Mouse: "Split Decisions" (Disney Channel); Marvel's Rocket & Groot: "Space Walk" (Disney XD App); Steven Universe: "Mr. Greg" (Cartoon Network); Teen Titans Go!: "Orangins" (Cartoon Network)
**Outstanding Children's Program**: **Once Upon a Sesame Street Christmas (HBO)**; Girl Meets World (Disney Channel); Macy's Thanksgiving Day Parade 90th Celebration (NBC); School of Rock (Nickelodeon); Star Wars Rebels (Disney XD)	**Outstanding Special Class Program**: **70th Tony Awards (CBS)**; Hairspray Live! (NBC); The Oscars (ABC); Super Bowl LI Halftime Show Starring Lady Gaga (Fox)
**Outstanding Short Form Nonfiction or Reality Series**: **Viceland at the Women's March (Viceland)**; Creating Saturday Night Live (NBC); Jay Leno's Garage (NBC.com); Feud: Bette and Joan: Inside Look (FX.com); National Endowment for the Arts: United States Of Arts (arts.gov)	**Exceptional Merit in Documentary Filmmaking**: **LA 92 (Nat Geo)**; Bright Lights: Starring Carrie Fisher and Debbie Reynolds (HBO); O.J.: Made in America (ESPN); Oklahoma City (American Experience) (PBS); The White Helmets (Netflix)
**Outstanding Short Form Comedy or Drama Series**: **Los Pollos Hermanos Employee Training (AMC)**; Brown Girls (Open TV); Fear the Walking Dead: Passage (AMC.com); Broad City (ComedyCentral.com); Marvel's Agents of S.H.I.E.L.D.: Slingshot (ABC.com)	**Outstanding Short Form Variety Series**: **The Daily Show — Between the Scenes (thedailyshow.com)**; Behind The Voice (YouTube); Epic Rap Battles of History (YouTube); Honest Trailers (YouTube); The Star Wars Show (YouTube)

=== Acting ===
Acting
**Outstanding Guest Actor in a Comedy Series**: **Dave Chappelle – Saturday Night Live: "Host: Dave Chappelle" as himself (NBC)**; Riz Ahmed – Girls: "All I Ever Wanted" as Paul-Louis (HBO); Tom Hanks – Saturday Night Live: "Host: Tom Hanks" as himself (NBC); Hugh Laurie – Veep: "Blurb" as Tom James (HBO); Lin-Manuel Miranda – Saturday Night Live: "Host: Lin-Manuel Miranda" as himself (NBC); Matthew Rhys – Girls: "American Bitch" as Chuck Palmer (HBO)	**Outstanding Guest Actress in a Comedy Series**: **Melissa McCarthy – Saturday Night Live: "Host: Melissa McCarthy" as herself (NBC)**; Becky Ann Baker – Girls: "Gummies" as Loreen Doring (HBO); Angela Bassett – Master of None: "Thanksgiving" as Catherine (Netflix); Carrie Fisher – Catastrophe: "Episode 6" as Mia (Amazon)(posthumous); Wanda Sykes – Black-ish: "Lemons" as Daphne Lido (ABC); Kristen Wiig – Saturday Night Live: "Host: Kristen Wiig" as herself (NBC)
**Outstanding Guest Actor in a Drama Series**: **Gerald McRaney – This Is Us: "The Big Day" as Dr. Nathan Katowski (NBC)**; Hank Azaria – Ray Donovan: "Norman Saves the World" as Ed Cochran (Showtime); Brian Tyree Henry – This Is Us: "Memphis" as Ricky (NBC); Ben Mendelsohn – Bloodline: "Part 32" as Danny Rayburn (Netflix); Denis O'Hare – This Is Us: "Last Christmas" as Jessie (NBC); BD Wong – Mr. Robot: "eps2.3_logic-b0mb.hc" as Whiterose (USA)	**Outstanding Guest Actress in a Drama Series**: **Alexis Bledel – The Handmaid's Tale: "Late" as Emily / Ofglen (Hulu)**; Laverne Cox – Orange Is the New Black: "Doctor Psycho" as Sophia Burset (Netflix); Ann Dowd – The Leftovers: "The Most Powerful Man in the World (and His Identical Twin Brother)" as Patti Levin (HBO); Shannon Purser – Stranger Things: "Chapter Three: Holly, Jolly" as Barb Holland (Netflix); Cicely Tyson – How to Get Away with Murder: "Go Cry Somewhere Else" as Ophelia Harkness (ABC); Alison Wright – The Americans: "The Soviet Division" as Martha Hanson (FX)
**Outstanding Character Voice-Over Performance**: **Seth MacFarlane – Family Guy: "The Boys in the Band" as Peter Griffin, Stewie Griffin, Brian Griffin, and Glenn Quagmire (Fox)**; Dee Bradley Baker – American Dad!: "Fight and Flight" as Klaus (TBS); Nancy Cartwright – The Simpsons: "Looking for Mr. Goodbart" as Bart Simpson (Fox); Mo Collins – F Is for Family: "Pray Away" as Ginny, Jimmy Fitzsimmons, Lex, Ben, and Cutie Pie (Netflix); Kevin Kline – Bob's Burgers: "The Last Gingerbread House on the Left" as Mr. Calvin Fischoeder (Fox); Kristen Schaal – BoJack Horseman: "That's Too Much, Man!" as Sarah Lynn (Netflix)	**Outstanding Narrator**: **Meryl Streep – Five Came Back: "The Price of Victory" (Netflix)**; Laurence Fishburne – Year Million: "Homo Sapien 2.0" (Nat Geo); Ewan McGregor – Wild Scotland (Nat Geo WILD); Sam Neill – Wild New Zealand (Nat Geo WILD); Liev Schreiber – Muhammad Ali: Only One (HBO); Liev Schreiber – UConn: The March to Madness: "Episode 1" (HBO)
**Outstanding Actor in a Short Form Comedy or Drama Series**: **Kim Estes – Dicks as Amanda (Vimeo)**; Ty Burrell – Boondoggle as Ty (ABCd/ABC.com); John Michael Higgins – Tween Fest as Todd Crawford (Go90/FunnyOrDie); Jason Ritter – Tales of Titans as Greg (Go90/FunnyOrDie); Ben Schwartz – The Earliest Show as Josh Bath (FunnyOrDie); Alan Tudyk – Con Man as Wray Nerely (Comic-Con HQ)	**Outstanding Actress in a Short Form Comedy or Drama Series**: **Jane Lynch – Dropping the Soap as Olivia Vanderstein (Amazon)**; Lauren Lapkus – The Earliest Show as Samantha Newman (FunnyOrDie); Kelsey Scott – Fear the Walking Dead: Passage as Sierra (AMC.com); Mindy Sterling – Con Man as Bobbie (Comic-Con HQ); Mindy Sterling – secs & EXECS as Shirla (tellofilms.com)

=== Animation ===
Animation
**Outstanding Individual Achievement in Animation (Juried)**
- **Samurai Jack – Bryan Andrews (storyboard artist) (Episode: "XCIII") (Adult Swim)**
- **Samurai Jack – Scott Wills (production design) (Episode: "XCIII") (Adult Swim)**
- **Samurai Jack – Craig Kellman (character design) (Episode: "XCII") (Adult Swim)**
- **Samurai Jack – Lou Romano (background design) (Episode: "XCV") (Adult Swim)**
- **Wander Over Yonder – Justin Nichols (character animation) (Episode: "The End of the Galaxy") (Disney XD)**

=== Casting ===
Casting
**Outstanding Casting for a Comedy Series**: **Veep - Dorian Frankel and Sibby Kirchgessner (HBO)**; Atlanta - Alexa L. Fogel, Tara Feldstein Bennett and Chase Paris (FX); Master of None - Cody Beke and Teresa Razzauti (Netflix); Silicon Valley - Jeanne McCarthy, Nicole Abellera Hallman, and Leslie Woo (HBO); Transparent - Eyde Belasco (Amazon)	**Outstanding Casting for a Drama Series**: **Stranger Things - Carmen Cuba, Tara Feldstein Bennett and Chase Paris (Netflix)**; The Crown - Nina Gold and Robert Sterne (Netflix); The Handmaid's Tale - Sharon Bialy, Sherry Thomas, Russell Scott and Robin D. Cook (Hulu); This Is Us - Tiffany Little Canfield and Bernard Telsey (NBC); Westworld - John Papsidera (HBO)
**Outstanding Casting for a Limited Series, Movie, or Special**: **Big Little Lies - David Rubin (HBO)**; Fargo - Rachel Tenner, Jackie Lind, and Stephanie Gorin (FX); Feud: Bette and Joan - Robert J. Ulrich and Eric Dawson (FX); The Night Of - Avy Kaufman and Sabrina Hyman (HBO); The Wizard of Lies - Ellen Chenoweth (HBO)	**Outstanding Casting for a Reality Program**: **Born This Way - Sasha Alpert and Megan Sleeper (A&E)**; Project Runway - Sasha Alpert, Alissa Haight Carlton and Jen DeMartino (Lifetime); RuPaul's Drag Race - Goloka Bolte and Ethan Petersen (VH1); Survivor - Lynne Spiegel Spillman (CBS); The Voice - Michelle McNulty, Holly Dale and Courtney Burns (NBC)

=== Choreography ===
Choreography
**Outstanding Choreography**
- **Mandy Moore for Dancing with the Stars (Routines: "On Top Of The World" / "Carol Of The Bells") (ABC)**
- **Travis Wall for So You Think You Can Dance (Routines: "The Mirror / "Send In The Clowns" / "She Used To Be Mine") (Fox)**
  - Derek Hough for Dancing with the Stars (Routines: "Kairos") (ABC)
  - Fred Tallaksen for The Real O'Neals (Routines: "Born This Way" / "West Side Story" / "Boyfriend") (ABC)
  - Mandy Moore for So You Think You Can Dance (Routines: "Unsteady" / "This Is Not The End") (Fox)

=== Cinematography ===
Cinematography
**Outstanding Cinematography for a Multi-Camera Series**: **The Ranch: "Easy Come, Easy Go" – Donald A. Morgan (Netflix)**; 2 Broke Girls: "And the Planes, Fingers and Automobiles" – Christian La Fountaine (CBS); K.C. Undercover: "The Legend of Bad" / "Bad Cleo Brown" – Joseph Wilmond Calloway (Disney Channel); Superior Donuts: "Crime Time" – Gary Baum (CBS)	**Outstanding Cinematography for a Single-Camera Series (Half-Hour)**: **Veep: "Qatar" – David Miller (HBO)**; Ballers: "Game Day" – Rodney Taylor (HBO); Divorce: "Pilot" – Reed Morano (HBO); Mozart in the Jungle: "Now I Will Sing" – Tobias Datum (Amazon); Silicon Valley: "Success Failure" – Tim Suhrstedt (HBO); Transparent: "If I Were a Bell" – Jim Frohna (Amazon)
**Outstanding Cinematography for a Limited Series or Movie**: **The Night Of: "Ordinary Death" – Fred Elmes (HBO)**; Big Little Lies: "You Get What You Need" – Yves Bélanger (HBO); Black Mirror: "Nosedive" – Seamus McGarvey (Netflix); Fargo: "The Law of Vacant Places" – Dana Gonzales (FX); The Young Pope: "Episode 1" – Luca Bigazzi (HBO)	**Outstanding Cinematography for a Single-Camera Series (One Hour)**: **The Handmaid's Tale: "Offred" – Colin Watkinson (Hulu)**; The Crown: "Smoke and Mirrors" – Adriano Goldman (Netflix); The Man in the High Castle: "Fallout" – James Hawkinson (Amazon); Mr. Robot: "eps2.0_unm4sk-pt1.tc" / "eps2.0_unm4sk-pt2.tc" – Tod Campbell (USA); Sense8: "Obligate Mutualisms" – John Toll (Netflix); Stranger Things: "Chapter Eight: The Upside Down" – Tim Ives (Netflix); Westworld: "The Original" – Paul Cameron (HBO)
**Outstanding Cinematography for a Reality Program**: **Born This Way: "Rough Waters" (A&E)**; The Amazing Race: "Bucket List Type Stuff" (CBS); Deadliest Catch: "Uncharted Territory" (Discovery Channel); Life Below Zero: "Loaded" (Nat Geo); Survivor: "The Stakes Have Been Raised" (CBS)	**Outstanding Cinematography for Nonfiction Programming**: **Planet Earth II: "Islands" – Mark MacEwen, Max Hug Williams, Jonathan Jones, Mateo Willis, Richard Wollocombe, Pete McCowen, Warwick Sloss, Paul Stewart, Derek Frankowski, John Shier, and Tom Fitz (BBC America)**; 13th – Hans Charles and Kira Kelly (Netflix); Anthony Bourdain: Parts Unknown: "Rome" – Todd Liebler and Zach Zamboni (CNN); Chef's Table: "Virgilio Martinez" – Will Basanta (Netflix); O.J.: Made in America: "Part 4" – Nick Higgins (ESPN); Planet Earth II: "Cities" – John Aitchison, Rob Whitworth, Kevin Flay, Mark MacEwen, Gordon Buchanan, Gavin Thurston, Mateo Willis, Michael Kelem, Mark Smith, and Sandesh Kadur (BBC America)

=== Commercial ===
Programs
**Outstanding Commercial**
- **"Calling JohnMalkovich.com" (Squarespace)**
  - "Love Cam" (Ad Council Love Has No Labels)
  - "We Are America" (Ad Council Love Has No Labels)
  - "Why I March" (Women's March On Washington)
  - "Year in Search 2016" (Google)

=== Costumes ===
Costumes
**Outstanding Costumes for a Contemporary Series, Limited Series, or Movie**: **Big Little Lies (Episode: "You Get What You Need") (HBO)**; Empire (Episode: "Light In Darkness") (Fox); Grace and Frankie (Episode: "The Art Show") (Netflix); House of Cards (Episode: "Chapter 61") (Netflix); Transparent (Episode: "To Sardines and Back") (Amazon)	**Outstanding Costumes for a Period/Fantasy Series, Limited Series, or Movie**: **The Crown (Episode: "Wolferton Splash") (Netflix)**; Feud: Bette and Joan (Episode: "And the Winner Is... (The Oscars of 1963)") (FX); Genius (Episode: "Einstein: Chapter Seven") (Nat Geo); The Handmaid's Tale (Episode: "Offred") (Hulu); Westworld (Episode: "The Original") (HBO)
**Outstanding Costumes for a Variety, Nonfiction, or Reality Programming**: **RuPaul's Drag Race (Episode: "Oh. My. Gaga!") (VH1)**; Dancing with the Stars (Episode: "Halloween Night") (ABC); Hairspray Live! (NBC); Portlandia (Episode: "Carrie Dates a Hunk") (IFC); Saturday Night Live (Episode: "Host: Emily Blunt") (NBC)

=== Directing ===
Directing
**Outstanding Directing for Nonfiction Programming**: **O.J.: Made in America: "Part 3" – Ezra Edelman (ESPN)**; 13th – Ava DuVernay (Netflix); Bright Lights: Starring Carrie Fisher and Debbie Reynolds – Alexis Bloom and Fisher Stevens (HBO); Planet Earth II: "Cities" – Fredi Devas (BBC America); Planet Earth II: "Islands" – Elizabeth White (BBC America)	**Outstanding Directing for a Variety Special**: **The Oscars – Glenn Weiss (ABC)**; Full Frontal with Samantha Bee Presents Not the White House Correspondents' Dinner – Paul Pennolino (TBS); Stephen Colbert's Live Election Night Democracy's Series Finale: Who's Going to Clean Up This Shit? – Jim Hoskinson (Showtime); Tony Bennett Celebrates 90: The Best Is Yet to Come – Jerry Foley (NBC)

=== Hairstyling ===
Hairstyling
**Outstanding Hairstyling for a Single-Camera Series**: **Westworld (Episode: "Contrapasso") (HBO)**; The Crown (Episode: "Hyde Park Corner") (Netflix); Penny Dreadful (Episode: "Ebb Tide") (Showtime); Stranger Things (Episode: "Chapter Two: The Weirdo On Maple Street") (Netflix); Vikings (Episode: "Revenge") (History)	**Outstanding Hairstyling for a Multi-Camera Series or Special**: **Hairspray Live! (NBC)**; Dancing with the Stars (Episode: "A Night at the Movies") (ABC); RuPaul's Drag Race (Episode: "Oh. My. Gaga!") (VH1); Saturday Night Live (Episode: "Host : Dwayne Johnson") (NBC); The Voice (Episode: "Live Playoffs, Night 1") (NBC)
**Outstanding Hairstyling for a Limited Series or Movie**: **Feud: Bette and Joan (FX)**; American Horror Story: Roanoke (FX); Big Little Lies (HBO); Fargo (FX); Genius (Episode: "Einstein: Chapter One") (Nat Geo)

=== Hosting ===
Hosting
**Outstanding Host for a Reality or Reality-Competition Program**
- **RuPaul Charles for RuPaul's Drag Race (VH1)**
  - Alec Baldwin for Match Game (ABC)
  - W. Kamau Bell for United Shades of America (CNN)
  - Heidi Klum and Tim Gunn for Project Runway (Lifetime)
  - Gordon Ramsay for MasterChef Junior (Fox)
  - Martha Stewart and Snoop Dogg for Martha & Snoop's Potluck Dinner Party (VH1)

=== Interactive Media ===
Interactive Media
**Outstanding Original Interactive Program**: **The People's House – Inside The White House With Barack And Michelle Obama (Samsung/Oculus)**; Amigo To The Rescue: Disney Junior Interactive Show (iOS); Dear Angelica (Oculus); HITRECORD x ACLU: Are You There Democracy? It's Me, The Internet (The Huffington Post/YouTube); Mission: ISS (Oculus)	**Outstanding Interactive Program**: **Last Week Tonight with John Oliver (HBO)**; Full Frontal with Samantha Bee Online (SamanthaBee.com); The Late Late Show with James Corden (CBS/CBS Interactive); Saturday Night Live Multiplatform Experience (NBC); The Tonight Show Starring Jimmy Fallon (NBC)
**Outstanding Creative Achievement In Interactive Media Within A Scripted Program**: **Westworld (DiscoverWestworld.com/HBO Entertainment)**; The Man In The High Castle: Resistance Radio (Amazon); The Mr. Robot Virtual Reality Experience (USA); The Simpsons – Planet of the Couches (play.google.com); Stranger Things VR Experience (Netflix)	**Outstanding Creative Achievement In Interactive Media Within An Unscripted Program**: **The Oscars: All Access (Oscars.com)**; E! Live 360 (Red Carpet Show) (E! News Mobile App); Stand For Rights: A Benefit for the ACLU with Tom Hanks (Facebook Live); Stand Up To Cancer: #Reasons2StandUp (standup2cancer.org); The Voice On Snapchat Show (NBC)
**Outstanding Innovation in Interactive Programming (Juried)**: **Pearl – Patrick Osborne, direction, David Eisenmann, production, Karen Dufilho, executive production (Google)**

=== Lighting Design / Direction ===
Lighting Design / Direction
**Outstanding Lighting Design / Lighting Direction for a Variety Series**: **Dancing with the Stars (Episode: "Cirque Du Soleil Night") (ABC)**; America's Got Talent (Episode: "Episode 1120") (NBC); Saturday Night Live (Episode: "Host: Jimmy Fallon") (NBC); So You Think You Can Dance (Episode: "Season 13 Finale") (Fox); The Voice (Episode: "Live Finale (Part 2)") (NBC)	**Outstanding Lighting Design / Lighting Direction for a Variety Special**: **Super Bowl 51 Halftime Show (Fox)**; 59th Grammy Awards (CBS); 70th Annual Tony Awards (CBS); Hairspray Live! (NBC); The Oscars (ABC)

=== Main Title Design ===
Main Title Design
**Outstanding Main Title Design**
- **Stranger Things (Netflix)**
  - American Gods (Starz)
  - The Crown (Netflix)
  - Feud: Bette and Joan (FX)
  - Westworld (HBO)

=== Make-up ===
Make-up
**Outstanding Make-up for a Single-Camera Series (Non-Prosthetic)**: **Westworld (Episode: "The Original") (HBO)**; Penny Dreadful (Episode: "Perpetual Night") (Showtime); Stranger Things (Episode: "Chapter Six: The Monster") (Netflix); This Is Us (Episode: "I Call Marriage") (NBC); Vikings (Episode: "All His Angels") (History)	**Outstanding Make-up for a Multi-Camera Series or Special (Non-Prosthetic)**: **Saturday Night Live (Episode: "Host : Alec Baldwin") (NBC)**; Dancing with the Stars (Episode: "Halloween Night") (ABC); Hairspray Live! (NBC); Mad TV (Episode: "Episode #1.4") (The CW); RuPaul's Drag Race (Episode: "Oh. My. Gaga!") (VH1); The Voice (Episode: "Live Playoffs, Night 1") (NBC)
**Outstanding Make-up for a Limited Series or Movie (Non-Prosthetic)**: **Feud: Bette and Joan (FX)**; American Horror Story: Roanoke (FX); Big Little Lies (HBO); Fargo (FX); Genius (Nat Geo)	**Outstanding Prosthetic Make-up for a Series, Limited Series, Movie, or Special**: **American Horror Story: Roanoke (FX)**; Penny Dreadful (Episode: "No Beast So Fierce") (Showtime); Saturday Night Live (Episode: "Host : Alec Baldwin") (NBC); The Walking Dead (Episode: "The Day Will Come When You Won't Be") (AMC); Westworld (Episode: "The Original") (HBO)

=== Motion Design ===
Motion Design
**Outstanding Motion Design (Juried)**
- **Beyond Magic – Orion Tait (executive creative direction), Thomas Schmid (creative direction), Daniel Oeffinger (creative direction), William Trebutien (lead animation) (ABC)**
- **13th – Angus Wall (co-creative direction), Leanne Dare (co-creative direction), Lynn Cho (design), Dan Meehan (animation), Ekin Akalin (animation) (Netflix)**

=== Music ===
Music
**Outstanding Music Composition for a Series (Original Dramatic Score)**: **House of Cards: "Chapter 63" – Jeff Beal (Netflix)**; The Crown: "Hyde Park Corner" – Rupert Gregson-Williams (Netflix); Planet Earth II: "Islands" – Jacob Shea and Jasha Klebe (BBC America); A Series of Unfortunate Events: "A Bad Beginning" – James Newton Howard (Netflix); Taboo: "Episode 1" – Max Richter (FX); Victoria: "Doll 123" – Martin Phipps, Natalie Holt, and Ruth Barrett (PBS)	**Outstanding Music Composition for a Limited Series, Movie, or Special (Original Dramatic Score)**: **Fargo: "Aporia" – Jeff Russo (FX)**; Feud: Bette and Joan: "Pilot" – Mac Quayle (FX); Five Came Back: "The Price of Victory" – Jeremy Turner (Netflix); O.J.: Made in America: "Part 3" – Gary Lionelli (ESPN); Suite Française – Rael Jones (Lifetime); The White Helmets – Patrick Jonsson (Netflix)
**Outstanding Music Direction**: **Taking The Stage: African American Music and Stories That Changed America (ABC)**; American Epic (The American Epic Sessions) (PBS); Joshua Bell: Seasons of Cuba (Live From Lincoln Center) (PBS); Stayin' Alive: A Grammy Salute to the Music of the Bee Gees (CBS); Super Bowl LI Halftime Show Starring Lady Gaga (Fox); Tony Bennett Celebrates 90: The Best Is Yet to Come (NBC)	**Outstanding Original Music and Lyrics**: **13th – "Letter to the Free" (Netflix)**; Crazy Ex-Girlfriend: "When Will Josh and His Friend Leave Me Alone?" – "We Tapped That Ass" (The CW); Jimmy Kimmel Live!: "Jessica Chastain/Willie Nelson/Hunter Hayes" – "The Ballad of Claus Jorstad (Devil Stool)" (ABC); Duck The Halls: A Mickey Mouse Christmas Special – "Jing-a-Ling-a-Ling" (Disney Channel); Saturday Night Live: "Host: Casey Affleck" – "Last Christmas" (NBC); Unbreakable Kimmy Schmidt: "Kimmy's Roommate Lemonades!" – "Hell No" (Netflix)
**Outstanding Original Main Title Theme Music**: **Stranger Things – Michael Stein and Kyle Dixon (Netflix)**; Feud: Bette and Joan – Mac Quayle (FX); Genius – Hans Zimmer and Lorne Balfe (Nat Geo); The Good Fight – David Buckley (CBS); Victoria – Martin Phipps (PBS); Westworld – Ramin Djawadi (HBO)	**Outstanding Music Supervision**: **Big Little Lies: "You Get What You Need" – Susan Jacobs (HBO)**; Better Call Saul: "Sunk Costs" – Thomas Golubić (AMC); Girls: "Goodbye Tour" – Manish Raval, Jonathan Leahy, and Tom Wolfe (HBO); Master of None: "Amarsi Un Po'" – Zach Cowie and Kerri Drootin (Netflix); Stranger Things: "Chapter Two: The Weirdo on Maple Street" – Nora Felder (Netflix)

=== Picture Editing ===
Picture Editing
**Outstanding Single-Camera Picture Editing for a Drama Series**: **Stranger Things - Dean Zimmerman (Episode: "Chapter One: The Vanishing of Will Byers") (Netflix)**; Better Call Saul – Skip Macdonald (Episode: "Chicanery") (AMC); Better Call Saul – Kelley Dixon and Skip Macdonald (Episode: "Witness") (AMC); Stranger Things – Kevin D. Ross (Episode: "Chapter Seven: The Bathtub") (Netflix); Westworld – Andrew Seklir (Episode: "The Bicameral Mind") (HBO)	**Outstanding Single-Camera Picture Editing for a Comedy Series**: **Master of None – Jennifer Lilly (Episode: "The Thief") (Netflix)**; Silicon Valley – Brian Merken (Episode: "Server Error") (HBO); Silicon Valley – Tim Roche (Episode: "Success Failure") (HBO); Veep – Roger Nygard and Gennady Fridman (Episode: "Chicklet") (HBO); Veep – Eric Kissack (Episode: "Groundbreaking") (HBO)
**Outstanding Single-Camera Picture Editing for a Limited Series or Movie**: **The Night Of - Jay Cassidy and Nick Houy (Episode: "The Beach") (HBO)**; Big Little Lies – Editing Team (Note: Veronique Barbe, David Berman, Justin LaChance, Maxime Lahaie, Sylvain Lebel and Jim Vega) (Episode: "You Get What You Need") (HBO); Fargo – Henk Van Eeghen (Episode: "Aporia") (FX); Fargo – Regis Kimble (Episode: "The Law of Vacant Places") (FX); Fargo – Curtis Thurber (Episode: "The Narrow Escape Problem") (FX)	**Outstanding Multi-Camera Picture Editing for a Comedy Series**: **The Big Bang Theory – Peter Chakos (Episode: "The Holiday Summation") (CBS)**; 2 Broke Girls – Chris Poulos (Episode: "And the Planes, Fingers and Automobiles") (CBS); One Day at a Time – Pat Barnett (Episode: "A Snowman's Tale") (Netflix); Last Man Standing – Kris Trexler (Episode: "Trick or Treat") (ABC); Mom – Joe Bella (Episode: "Bad Hand and British Royalty") (CBS)
**Outstanding Picture Editing for Variety Programming**: **Last Week Tonight with John Oliver – Anthony Miale (Segment: "F*ck 2016") (HBO)**; Conan – Robert James Ashe, David Grecu, Meaghan Wilbur, and Christopher P. Heller (Episode: "Conan in Berlin") (TBS); Drunk History – Aaron Morris (Episode: "Bar Fights") (Comedy Central); Last Week Tonight with John Oliver – Ryan Barger (Segment: "Stoplight") (HBO); Saturday Night Live – Adam Epstein (Segment: "Kellyanne Conway") (NBC)	**Outstanding Picture Editing for Nonfiction Programming**: **O.J.: Made in America – Bret Granato, Maya Mumma and Ben Sozanski (ESPN)**; 13th – Spencer Averick (Netflix); The Beatles: Eight Days a Week – Paul Crowder (Hulu); Planet Earth II – Dave Pearce (Episode: "Cities") (BBC America); Planet Earth II – Matt Meech (Episode: "Islands") (BBC America); Vice – Joe Langford, Richard Lowe and Denny Thomas (Episode: "Assad's Syria/Cost Of Climate Change") (HBO)
**Outstanding Picture Editing for a Structured or Competition Reality Program**: **RuPaul's Drag Race – Jamie Martin, John Lim and Michael Roha (Episode: "Oh. My. Gaga!") (VH1)**; The Amazing Race – Editing Team (Note: Julian Gomez, Ryan Leamy, Jennifer Nelson, Paul C. Nielsen, Eric Beetner, Tori Rodman andKatherine Griffin) (Episode: "We're Only Doing Freaky Stuff Today") (CBS); Project Runway – Editing Team (Note: Lisa Trulli, Eileen Finkelstein, Donald Bull, Julie Cohen and Darren Hallihan) (Episode: "An Unconventional Launch Party") (Lifetime); Project Runway – Editing Team (Note: Adrienne Salisbury, Darren Hallihan, Jensen Neil Rufe, Ryan Anthony Mallick and Scott Austin Hahn) (Episode: "Finale, Part 2") (Lifetime); Shark Tank – Editing Team (Note: David R. Finkelstein, Ed Martinez, Tom McGah, Andrew Oliver, Nick Staller, Matt Stevenson and Joel Watson) (Episode: "Episode 801") (ABC); Survivor – Editing Team (Note: Mike Greer, Chad Bertalotto, Tim Atzinger, Evan Meduich, David Armstrong, James Ciccarello and Jacob Teixeira) (Episode: "About to Have a Rumble") (CBS)	**Outstanding Picture Editing for an Unstructured Reality Program**: **Life Below Zero – Ian Richardson, Tony Diaz, Eric Michael Schrader and Matt Mercer (Episode: "River Of Rage") (Nat Geo)**; Born This Way – Editing Team (Note: Jarrod Burt, Jacob Lane, Stephanie Lyra, M'Daya Meliani, Paul Cross, Dave McIntosh and Ryan Rambach) (Episode: "Dream Come True") (A&E); Born This Way – Peggy Tachdjian, Tonya Noll, Jacob Lane and Jarrod Burt (Episode: "Oh Baby!") (A&E); Born This Way – Editing Team (Note: Daysha M. Broadway, Dan Zimmerman, Jacob Lane, Jarrod Burt, M'Daya Meliani and Ryan Rambach) (Episode: "The Times They Are A'Changin") (A&E); Deadliest Catch – Josh Earl, ACE, Rob Butler, Nathen Araiza and Ben Bulatao (Episode: "Uncharted Territory") (Discovery Channel)

=== Production Design ===
Production Design
**Outstanding Production Design for a Narrative Contemporary or Fantasy Program (One Hour or More)**: **The Handmaid's Tale (Episode: "Offred") (Hulu)**; Penny Dreadful (Episodes: "Perpetual Night"/"The Blessed Dark") (Showtime); Westworld (Episode: "The Original") (HBO); Westworld (Episode: "The Bicameral Mind") (HBO); The Young Pope (HBO)	**Outstanding Production Design for a Narrative Period Program (One Hour or More)**: **The Crown (Episode: "Smoke and Mirrors") (Netflix)**; Feud: Bette and Joan (FX); The Man In The High Castle (Episode: "The Tiger's Cave") (Amazon); Masters of Sex (Episodes: "Freefall", "Inventory", "The Pleasure Protocol") (Showtime); Stranger Things (Episode: "Chapter One: The Vanishing of Will Byers") (Netflix)
**Outstanding Production Design for a Narrative Program (Half-Hour or Less)**: **Veep (Episode: "Omaha") (HBO)**; The Big Bang Theory (Episode: "The Dependence Transcendence") (CBS); Grace and Frankie (Episodes: "The Burglary"; "The Gun") (Netflix); Mozart in the Jungle (Episode: "Now I Will Sing") (Amazon); Silicon Valley (Episodes: "Success Failure"; "Terms Of Service"; "Hooli-Con") (HBO); Transparent (Episode: "If I Were A Bell") (Amazon)	**Outstanding Production Design for a Variety, Nonfiction, Reality, or Reality-Competition Series**: **Saturday Night Live (Episode: "Host : Alec Baldwin") (NBC)**; Bill Nye Saves The World (Episode: "Earth is a Hot Mess") (Netflix); Drunk History (Episode: "Hamilton") (Comedy Central); Portlandia (Episode: "Fred's Cell Phone Company") (IFC); The Voice (Episode: "Live Finale (Part 1)") (NBC)
**Outstanding Production Design for a Variety, Nonfiction, Event, or Award Special**: **Hairspray Live! (NBC)**; 74th Golden Globe Awards (NBC); Full Frontal with Samantha Bee Presents Not the White House Correspondents' Dinner (TBS); The Oscars (ABC); Super Bowl LI Halftime Show Starring Lady Gaga (Fox)

=== Sound ===
Sound
**Outstanding Sound Editing for a Series**: **Stranger Things (Episode: "Chapter Eight: The Upside Down") (Netflix)**; Black Sails (Episode: "XXXVII") (Starz); Gotham (Episode: "Destiny Calling") (Fox); Homeland (Episode: "America First") (Showtime); Westworld (Episode: "The Bicameral Mind") (HBO)	**Outstanding Sound Editing for a Limited Series, Movie, or Special**: **The Night Of (Episode: "Subtle Beast") (HBO)**; American Horror Story: Roanoke (Episode: "Chapter 1") (FX); Fargo (Episode: "Who Rules The Land Of Denial?") (FX); Genius (Episode: "Einstein: Chapter One") (Nat Geo); Sherlock: The Lying Detective (PBS)
**Outstanding Sound Editing for Nonfiction Programming (Single or Multi-Camera)**: **The Beatles: Eight Days a Week (Hulu)**; 13th (Netflix); Anthony Bourdain: Parts Unknown (Episode: "Hanoi") (CNN); Leah Remini: Scientology and the Aftermath (Episode: "Golden Era") (A&E); Planet Earth II (Episode: "Cities") (BBC America)	**Outstanding Sound Mixing for a Comedy or Drama Series (One Hour)**: **Westworld (Episode: "The Bicameral Mind") (HBO)**; Better Call Saul (Episode: "Witness") (AMC); House of Cards (Episode: "Chapter 53") (Netflix); Mr. Robot (Episode: "eps2.8_h1dden-pr0cess.axx") (USA); Stranger Things (Episode: "Chapter Eight: The Upside Down") (Netflix)
**Outstanding Sound Mixing for a Limited Series or Movie**: **The Night Of (Episode: "The Beach") (HBO)**; Big Little Lies (Episode: "You Get What You Need") (HBO); Fargo (Episode: "Who Rules the Land of Denial?") (FX); Genius (Episode: "Einstein: Chapter One") (Nat Geo); Sherlock: The Lying Detective (PBS)	**Outstanding Sound Mixing for a Comedy or Drama Series (Half-Hour) and Animation**: **Mozart in the Jungle (Episode: "Now I Will Sing") (Amazon)**; Master of None (Episode: "The Dinner Party") (Netflix); Modern Family (Episode: "Basketball") (ABC); Silicon Valley (Episode: "Intellectual Property") (HBO); Veep (Episode: "Omaha") (HBO)
**Outstanding Sound Mixing for a Variety Series or Special**: **59th Grammy Awards (CBS)**; **2017 Rock and Roll Hall of Fame Induction Ceremony (HBO)**; Last Week Tonight with John Oliver (Episode: "Sub-Prime Auto Loans") (HBO); The Oscars (ABC); Super Bowl LI Halftime Show Starring Lady Gaga (Fox); The Voice (Episode: "Finale") (NBC)	**Outstanding Sound Mixing for Nonfiction Program (Single or Multi-Camera)**: **The Beatles: Eight Days a Week (Hulu)**; 13th (Netflix); Anthony Bourdain: Parts Unknown (Episode: "Rome") (CNN); O.J.: Made in America (Episode: "Part 2") (ESPN); Planet Earth II (Episode: "Cities") (BBC America)

=== Special Visual Effects ===
Special Visual Effects
**Outstanding Special Visual Effects**: **Westworld (Episode: "The Bicameral Mind") (HBO)**; American Gods (Episode: "The Bone Orchard") (Starz); Black Sails (Episode: "XXIX") (Starz); The Man in the High Castle (Episode: "Fallout") (Amazon); Vikings (Episode: "On the Eve") (History)	**Outstanding Special Visual Effects in a Supporting Role**: **Gotham (Episode: "Heavydirtysoul") (Fox)**; The Crown (Episodes: "Windsor") (Netflix); Genius (Episode: "Einstein: Chapter One") (Nat Geo); The Handmaid's Tale (Episodes: "Birth Day") (Hulu); Taboo (Episode: "Episode 1") (FX)

=== Stunt Coordination ===
Stunt Coordination
**Outstanding Stunt Coordination for a Comedy Series or Variety Program**: **Shameless (Showtime)**; Angie Tribeca (TBS); Brooklyn Nine-Nine (Fox); Saturday Night Live (NBC); Unbreakable Kimmy Schmidt (Netflix)	**Outstanding Stunt Coordination for a Drama Series, Limited Series, or Movie**: **Marvel's Luke Cage (Netflix)**; The Blacklist (NBC); Blindspot (NBC); Gotham (Fox); MacGyver (CBS)

=== Technical Direction ===
Technical Direction
**Outstanding Technical Direction, Camerawork, Video Control for a Series**: **Saturday Night Live (Episode: "Host: Jimmy Fallon") (NBC)**; The Big Bang Theory (Episode: "The Locomotion Reverberation") (CBS); Dancing with the Stars (Episode: "Episode 2311A") (ABC); Last Week Tonight with John Oliver (Episode: "Gerrymandering") (HBO); The Voice (Episode: "Live Finale (Part 2)") (NBC)	**Outstanding Technical Direction, Camerawork, Video Control for a Limited Series, Movie, or Special**: **Hairspray Live! (NBC)**; 70th Tony Awards (CBS); Carpool Karaoke Primetime Special 2017 (CBS); The Oscars (ABC); Super Bowl LI Halftime Show Starring Lady Gaga (Fox)

=== Writing ===
Writing
**Outstanding Writing for Nonfiction Programming**: **13th (Netflix)**; Amanda Knox (Netflix); Anthony Bourdain: Parts Unknown (Episode: "Houston") (CNN); The Beatles: Eight Days a Week (Hulu); Bill Nye Saves the World (Episode: "The Sexual Spectrum") (Netflix)	**Outstanding Writing for a Variety Special**: **Full Frontal with Samantha Bee Presents Not The White House Correspondents' Dinner (TBS)**; 70th Annual Tony Awards (CBS); Louis C.K.: 2017, Written by Louis C.K. (Netflix); Sarah Silverman: A Speck of Dust, Written by Sarah Silverman (Netflix); Stephen Colbert's Live Election Night Democracy's Series Finale: Who's Going To Clean Up This Sh*t? (Showtime)

== Wins by network ==
Network	Program	Individual	Total
HBO	3	16	19
Netflix	1	15	16
NBC	0	9	9
ABC	2	5	7
Fox	1	4	5
Hulu	0	5	5
Adult Swim	0	4	4
CBS	2	2	4
FX	0	4	4
A&E	1	2	3
VH1	0	3	3
Amazon	0	2	2
BBC America	1	1	2
ESPN	0	2	2
Nat Geo	1	1	2
AMC	1	0	1
Cartoon Network	1	0	1
CNN	1	0	1
Comedy Central	1	0	1
Disney XD	0	1	1
Samsung / Oculus	1	0	1
Showtime	0	1	1
TBS	0	1	1
Viceland	1	0	1
Vimeo	0	1	1

== Programs with multiple awards ==
Program	Awards
Saturday Night Live	5
Stranger Things	5
Westworld	5
13th	4
The Night Of	4
Samurai Jack	4
Big Little Lies	3
Hairspray Live!	3
The Handmaid's Tale	3
RuPaul's Drag Race	3
Veep	3
The Beatles: Eight Days a Week	2
Born This Way	2
The Crown	2
Dancing with the Stars	2
Feud: Bette & Joan	2
Last Week Tonight with John Oliver	2
O.J.: Made in America	2
Planet Earth II	2

== Programs with multiple nominations ==
Program	Nominations
Saturday Night Live	16
Westworld	15
Stranger Things	14
Fargo	10
Planet Earth II	10
The Voice	10
The Crown	9
Feud: Bette and Joan	9
13th	8
Big Little Lies	8
Dancing with the Stars	7
Genius	7
Hairspray Live!	7
RuPaul's Drag Race	7
Veep	7
The Handmaid's Tale	6
O.J.: Made in America	6
The Oscars	6
Silicon Valley	6
Super Bowl LI Halftime Show Starring Lady Gaga	6
Anthony Bourdain: Parts Unknown	5
The Beatles: Eight Days a Week	5
Born This Way	5
Full Frontal with Samantha Bee	5
Last Week Tonight with John Oliver	5
Master of None	5
The Night Of	5
This Is Us	5
70th Tony Awards	4
American Horror Story: Roanoke	4
Better Call Saul	4
Girls	4
The Man in the High Castle	4
Mr. Robot	4
Penny Dreadful	4
Project Runway	4
Transparent	4
The Big Bang Theory	3
Deadliest Catch	3
Drunk History	3
Gotham	3
House of Cards	3
Mozart in the Jungle	3
The Simpsons	3
So You Think You Can Dance	3
Survivor	3
Vikings	3
2 Broke Girls	2
59th Grammy Awards	2
Amanda Knox	2
The Amazing Race	2
American Gods	2
Bill Nye Saves The World	2
Black Sails	2
Bob's Burgers	2
Bright Lights: Starring Carrie Fisher and Debbie Reynolds	2
Carpool Karaoke Primetime Special 2017	2
Chef's Table	2
Con Man	2
The Earliest Show	2
Fear the Walking Dead: Passage	2
Five Came Back	2
Grace and Frankie	2
Leah Remini: Scientology and the Aftermath	2
Life Below Zero	2
Portlandia	2
Shark Tank	2
Unbreakable Kimmy Schmidt	2
United Shades of America	2
Vice	2
Victoria	2
The White Helmets	2
The Young Pope	2
