= Rob Whitworth =

British photographer

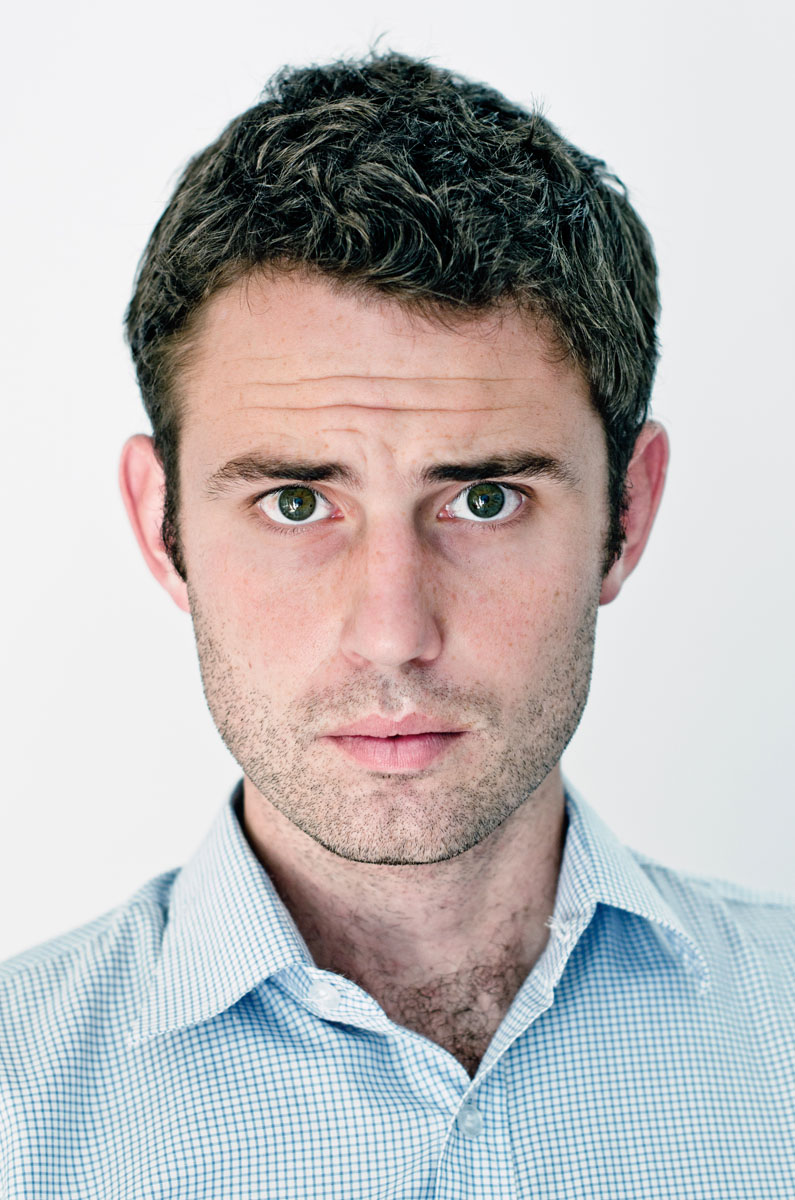
- Born: 27 May 1982 (age 44); United Kingdom
- Education: Norwich School of Art & Design, UK
- Occupation: Film maker
- Known for: Time-lapse photography
- Notable work: Flow motion time-lapse videos of Asian cities
- Awards: IF product design award

Rob Whitworth (born 27 May 1982) is a British photographer and urban film maker, based in Norwich, with flow motion based works throughout Asia. His works are mainly based on time-lapse, and they have received nine million online views and multiple awards.

== Career ==
After completing his education with a degree in Photography from Norwich School of Art & Design, United Kingdom, Whitworth turned to the field of mixed photography and videography resulting in millions of online views and staff picks from websites like Vimeo, BBC and Mashable, among others. The university now lists Whitworth in its notable alumni list.

His efforts in the film making side resulted in Best Experimental Film at the Tiburon International Film Festival, 2012, and the Jury's Choice Award at the 5th Kuala Lumpur Eco Film Fest, 2012, being added to his list of awards. Rob Whitworth has been cited for his hyperlapse and time-lapse photography and short videos of Asian cities such as Dubai, Istanbul, Shanghai, Pyongyang, Ho Chi Minh and Kuala Lumpur free flow traffic.

This is Shanghai and Once Upon a Time in Cappadocia are among his films that received significant media coverage. Reportedly, he captures fast-paced flow motion videos with high-powered telephoto lenses and other filming techniques to attribute a unique aspect to his photography and film making.

In 2016, Whitworth's flow motion video of Mohammed bin Rashid Space Centre was described by Timeout Dubai as "awe-inspiring". In the same year, he had a key role in the filming of the Planet Earth II episode "Cities" in which the documentary depicts the world's noteworthy cities from Whitworth's camera. This episode of the documentary was awarded the Best Photography (Factual) award at the 2017 British Academy Television Craft Awards and was nominated for Outstanding Picture Editing for Nonfiction Programming at the 69th Primetime Creative Arts Emmy Awards. In 2018 he created the title sequence for BBC UK World Cup coverage.

== Selected exhibitions ==
- Lana Lights Festival, Italy 2015
- Gurgaon International Film and Literature Festival India 2015
- International Film Festival Rotterdam the Netherlands 2015
- Norwich Film Festival Norfolk UK 2013
- Seattle Design Festival Seattle 2013
- Timelapse Showfest Madrid 2013
- Zero Film Festival Toronto and Montreal 2013
- DisOrient Asian American Film Festival Oregon 2012
- Mudfest of Mudgee, Australia 2012
- ANIMAYO Las Palmas de Gran Canaria 2012
- Norwich Film Festival Norfolk, UK 2012
- Zero Film Festival London and New York 2012
- New Media Film Festival Los Angeles, CA 2012
- London International Creative Competition (LICC) London, 2012
