= Hyperlapse (application) =

Mobile app developed by Instagram

- Developer: Instagram
- Initial release: August 26, 2014; 11 years ago
- Stable release: 1.3.4 / August 21, 2020; 5 years ago
- Operating system: iOS
- Size: 18.8 MB
- Available in: 27 languages
- List of languages English, Croatian, Czech, Danish, Dutch, Finnish, French, German, Greek, Hungarian, Indonesian, Italian, Japanese, Korean, Malay, Norwegian Bokmål, Polish, Portuguese, Russian, Simplified Chinese, Slovak, Spanish, Swedish, Thai, Traditional Chinese, Turkish, Vietnamese
- Type: Video software
- Website: hyperlapse.instagram.com

A video made with Hyperlapse

Hyperlapse is a mobile app created by Instagram that enables users to produce hyperlapse and time-lapse videos. It was released on August 26, 2014.

== Overview ==
The app enables users to record videos up to 45 minutes of footage in a single take, which can be subsequently accelerated to create a hyperlapse cinematographic effect. Whereas time-lapses are normally produced by stitching together stills from traditional cameras, the app uses an image stabilization algorithm that steadies the appearance of video by eliminating jitter. Unlike Instagram, the app offers no filters. Instead, the only post-production option available to users is the modification of playback speed which can range from 1x to 40x normal playback speed.

The app is only available on iOS devices, but Instagram suggested in August 2014 that an Android version would likely be made available in the near future. Fall Out Boy's music video for "Centuries" was filmed using the Hyperlapse app.

Hyperlapse was removed from app stores by Instagram as of March 1, 2022.
