= Hillsborough (2014 film) =

2014 documentary film

- Based on: Hillsborough disaster
- Directed by: Daniel Gordon
- Country of origin: United States; United Kingdom
- Original language: English

Production
- Producer: Daniel Gordon
- Editor: Andy R. Worboys
- Running time: 121 minutes
- Production companies: ESPN; BBC

Original release
- Release: 15 April 2014 (U.S.)
- Release: 8 May 2016 (UK)

Hillsborough is a 2014 documentary about the Hillsborough disaster. Directed and produced by Daniel Gordon, the two-hour film chronicles the disaster, the investigations, and their lingering effects; it also includes interviews with survivors, victims' relatives, police officers and investigators. It was co-produced by ESPN and BBC, first airing as a part of ESPN's series of sports films entitled 30 for 30, under the heading "Soccer Stories". Hillsborough aired in the United States on ESPN on 15 April 2014, the 25th anniversary of the disaster. The documentary could not be shown in the United Kingdom when it originally aired in 2014, due to the High Court inquest of 2012 still being in progress. However, after the verdict of the inquest had been announced, the BBC aired the documentary on 8 May 2016, with additional footage from the inquest and final verdict.

== Events described in the film ==
In 2012, the Hillsborough Independent Panel released its report and established an archive of media relating to the disaster. Much of the evidence reviewed by the panel had not been previously released to the public or to the media. Gordon's film draws on this newly available evidence to describe the events of 15 April 1989, as well as their causes and their consequences.

=== Before the disaster ===
- In 1981, at an FA Cup semi-final (Tottenham Hotspur v. Wolverhampton Wanderers) at Hillsborough, there was entry congestion at the Leppings Lane end, "things got crushy", and the fans were allowed in through Gate C; there was crushing including bruised ribs, but no deaths, and the congestion in the terraces was relieved by letting fans come through onto the edge of the pitch and sit on the perimeter track. Afterwards, someone said at a meeting that otherwise there might have been deaths, and got the reply "Bollocks!"; criminologist Phil Scraton, interviewed during the film, stated that this reply was a sign of deep-rooted institutional complacency.
- In 1985, the pens were set up at Hillsborough.
- Six months before the disaster, a young policeman was lured into a remote place in Ranmoor and attacked and left handcuffed by two men in balaclavas with pistols, but who proved to be two Yorkshire policemen. The enquiry into this severe hazing-type assault caused disciplinary measures in which four Yorkshire policemen were sacked, two were demoted and two transferred away, and Brian Mole - who had served since the early 1980s and was very experienced in football-related matters - was transferred to Barnsley, and as man in charge at Sheffield, he was replaced by David Duckenfield, who was much less experienced than his predecessor; at the briefing before the match, he spoke for a long time, but never mentioned crowd safety, and fumbled the name of Nottingham Forest club so badly that he appeared to know little about football.

=== The day of the disaster (15 April 1989) ===
- Ninety minutes before kickoff, few fans had arrived; the big crush came in the last 20 minutes or so before kickoff. In the pens behind the goal, the two central pens were very full; the outer two pens were much less crowded. The control box was above one end of the Leppings Lane end terraces, and could easily see all along those terraces. Outside, staff pulled some fans in through the turnstiles to try to relieve congestion. One policeman got so nervous at developments outside that he frantically radioed "For fuck's sake open these gates!" several times, despite police rules about language on radio.
- About eight minutes before kickoff, Duckenfield ordered Gate C to be opened. At first, the crowd walked in orderly, but up to and around kickoff, this changed into a crush. Unlike in 1988, no order was given to close the entry tunnel's gate when the terrace pens were full. There was no order to delay kickoff. When the player Peter Beardsley kicked and the ball hit the goal's crossbar, this seemed to make the crush much harder. People tried to climb the barriers and were ordered not to. Six minutes after kickoff, the referee stopped the game. Gates in the pitchside barrier were opened, people were allowed on the pitch, and casualties were laid out there. Some spectators were helped to climb up into a spectator area above the terrace. A camera view afterwards showed that some of the metal-mesh barriers were bent and crumpled. Someone compared the crush in the two pens to fish caught in a trawl net.
- Fans did not force the gate, which was opened by police order. However, in the control room, Duckenfield told Graham Kelly, an English football administrator, that Liverpool fans had charged, forcing entry to the central pens and thus causing the crush. A BBC commentator believed that statement and passed it on to camera.
- Emergency services failed to activate Sheffield's major incident plan, so resources were not diverted to Hillsborough. A traffic jam of ambulances developed in Penistone Road outside the stadium; the event was at the opposite end of the pitch. Emergency equipment such as defibrillators were not brought onto the pitch. Basic airway management tools such as tubes and oxygen were in short supply.
- Ten of the casualties were pronounced dead in hospital; all other fatal casualties were taken into Hillsborough Stadium's gymnasium. The emergency enquiry telephone number was jammed solid with callers, and one spectator's father seeking information had to drive to Sheffield over the Snake Pass, with the delays caused by the narrow twisting hilly road. Friends and family searching for loved ones were directed to a Boy's Club opposite Hammerton Road police station in Sheffield, and told to wait. From there they were carried in a double-decker bus to the Hillsborough stadium, and into a room, from which they were led one at a time into a room with Polaroid photographs of the faces of the dead on a wall. In that wall-display, the photographs were not sorted by skin colour or gender or race or age, characteristics which might otherwise have helped relatives to know which part of the display to look in; and the shiny surface of Polaroids hindered visibility of the image. If a relative identified a photograph, the body was brought out in a body bag on a trolley, and the relative was asked questions including many about alcohol drinking in a rather accusatory manner. Over 400 living casualties were treated in hospital.
- The police who were involved in the disaster, were ordered to write their reports not in their personal notebooks, but on sheets of A4 paper which were provided. Those sheets were collected. On those sheets, much text was marked for deletion, either by strikethrough, or by drawing a rectangle around the text and then drawing that rectangle's diagonal lines; and words to be added were handwritten in. Those sheets were then transcribed in typewriting on other sheets of A4 paper, obeying the deletion and insertion instructions, and producing apparently clean reports which were shown as authoritative evidence to the first inquest. It was noticed later that all or most of the deleted text was criticising the police's equipment supply and handling of the event.
- Dividing the terraces into separate pens stopped the fans from easing congestion by moving away sideways along the terraces, as they had done before.

=== After the disaster ===
- On 16 April 1989, Margaret Thatcher and Bernard Ingham and others arrived at Hillsborough. Although the official inquiry would state that fan behaviour was not the cause of the disaster, Ingham attributed the disaster to a "tanked-up mob of Liverpool supporters."
- Soon after that, newspapers published falsehoods about fan drunkenness and hooliganism including fans urinating on police. The stories were based on unsubstantiated claims made by, among others, a senior police official and a local MP who had not attended the match. This caused offending newspapers such as The Sun to see rapidly declining circulation and relevance in Liverpool, with many newsagents refusing to stock it and Liverpudlians calling it "the S*n" as if it were an expletive.
- Investigators examined the turnstiles for their mechanical performance and determined how many people arrived and when. Despite claims that "thousands" of fans had rushed in, the Gate C surveillance camera showed about 1400 people entering (approximately the capacity of the four central terraces).
- An attempt had been made after the disaster, to allege that the exit gate called Gate C had been forced open by rowdy fans trying to enter the ground before the match; it had in fact been opened on police order.
- On order of the coroner Stefan Popper, the dead were blood-tested for alcohol. Those found positive, when identified, were checked through police records for criminal records.
- The movie described a case of nervous breakdown in a policeman who had been at Hillsborough, precipitated some weeks afterwards by being stopped by the barrier coming down at an unmanned railway level crossing in Beighton in Sheffield.
- August 1989: the preliminary version of the Taylor Report came out.
- January 1990: the final version of the Taylor Report came out. It did not believe the stories about fan misbehaviour. But the coroner, acting independently of Taylor, reported "accidental death" for all the victims.
- March 1993: life support for Tony Bland was switched off, and he became the 96th victim of the Hillsborough disaster; see Hillsborough disaster#Stuart-Smith scrutiny.
- 1996: Phil Scraton, who spoke in the movie, saw a man on television talking about disaster, and recognized him as a policeman who had been at the Hillsborough disaster. After several months of attempts at contact, the two met in Hathersage, and again twice more. At the third meeting, the (now former) policeman brought in and showed a boxfile containing some of the policemen's typed reports, with the alterations described above, and called it "sanitising".
- 1997: the Labour Party came into power and promised to revisit Hillsborough.
- October 1998: Scraton went to the House of Lords's reading room in Parliament in London, and there was shown the police report papers, stacked untidily on a table in cardboard boxes. Inside the boxes, the police reports were in a thoroughly disordered and shuffled condition, some as photocopies. He sorted them into the three versions of each report (handwritten, original typed, edited), collated them, examined them, and reported what he found.
- 2000: The Hillsborough Family Support Group private-prosecuted Duckenfield and Bernard Murray for dereliction of duty, etc., at Hillsborough. The jury acquitted Murray and were hung on Duckenfield.
- 2004: The Sun publishes "The Real Truth" (echoing their libelous coverage from 1989 which was called "The Truth") which apologizes to residents of Liverpool for their coverage 15 years prior. This is not accepted by Liverpudlians as controversy surrounding The Sun's editor and his true feelings about the disaster bubble to the surface around the same time.
- 15 April 2009: to mark the 20th anniversary of the Hillsborough Disaster, 30,000 people attended a memorial service at Anfield in Liverpool. During the service, a speech by then Secretary of State for Culture, Media and Sport Andy Burnham was interrupted by a repeated chant started among the audience: "Justice for the 96!", drowning out the rest of his speech.
- January 2010: the British government established the Hillsborough Independent Panel, to oversee the release of documents about the disaster.

== See also ==
- List of association football films
