= Daniel Gordon (film director) =

British documentary film director

Daniel Gordon is a British documentary film director known for his documentaries on sports and North Korea.

== Career ==
Gordon previously worked for Sky Sports and Chrysalis. He wrote two books on Sheffield Wednesday FC. In December 2001, he was nominated for a BAFTA for producing and directing Darren Gough’s Cricket Academy.

He founded VeryMuchSo productions in January 2001, based in Sheffield.

In 2002, Gordon worked with Nicholas Bonner of Koryo Tours to bring the seven surviving members of the 1966 North Korea national football team to Britain. The resulting film, The Game of Their Lives won the 2003 Royal Television Society award for best sports documentary. Daniel was also nominated Best Newcomer at the 2003 Grierson Awards. The film also received a nomination for Best Documentary at the British Independent Film Awards. It won first prize at the Seville Film Festival.

Gordon and Bonner continued their collaboration to make A State of Mind, about two North Korean gymnasts preparing for the Pyongyang mass games, and Crossing the Line, about James Joseph Dresnok, the American soldier who defected to North Korea in 1962. The latter film, which was narrated by actor Christian Slater, was shown at the 2007 Sundance Film Festival, and was nominated for the Grand Jury Prize. Gordon and Bonner were also featured on a 60 Minutes report about Dresnok that broadcast on 28 January 2007 in the United States, and included footage from their film.

In 2012, Gordon directed a documentary for ESPN's 30 for 30 series entitled 9.79* about the 1988 Olympic Men's 100m final and the Ben Johnson doping scandal. He would direct two more 30 for 30 documentaries in the 2010s—Hillsborough, a 2014 ESPN–BBC coproduction coinciding with the 25th anniversary of the Hillsborough disaster, and George Best: All By Himself, a 2017 exploration of the life and career of Northern Ireland football legend George Best that was broadcast as part of the 30 for 30: Soccer Stories sub-series.

In 2019 he directed The Australian Dream, which won the AACTA Award for best feature documentary in the 2019 series. The film looked at the part played by racism in the demonising of Australian Rules football-player Adam Goodes, who is an Aboriginal Australian, and was written by award-winning Aboriginal journalist Stan Grant.

Gordon returned to the 30 for 30 series with The Life and Trials of Oscar Pistorius, a four-part examination of the life, career, and murder trial of Paralympic sprinter Oscar Pistorius that premiered in September 2020 on the ESPN+ streaming service. The crew was filming in South Africa at the onset of the COVID-19 pandemic, and they and Gordon were on "the last plane out of South Africa" prior to the country's lockdown. The film was originally intended to premiere at the Telluride Film Festival, which was cancelled due to the pandemic. Gordon also directed Billion Dollar Heist, 2023 a documentary on the Bangladesh Bank robbery and cybercrime.

== Personal life ==
Gordon grew up in Manchester.

He has a daughter who was born in 2007.
