= Unmistakably Lou =

Studio album by Lou Rawls
- Released: 1977
- Recorded: 1976–1977
- Studios: Sigma Sound, Philadelphia, Pennsylvania
- Genres: Philadelphia soul, jazz
- Length: 37:04
- Label: Philadelphia International
- Producers: Kenny Gamble, Leon Huff, Dexter Wansel, Bobby Martin, Jack Faith

Lou Rawls chronology
All Things in Time (1976)	Unmistakably Lou (1977)	When You Hear Lou, You've Heard It All (1977)

Professional ratings
Review scores
Source	Rating
AllMusic	4.5/5 stars
The Rolling Stone Album Guide	3.5/5 stars

Unmistakably Lou is an album by American R&B singer Lou Rawls, released in 1977 on the Philadelphia International Records label. It was Rawls's second PIR album. It performed respectably (No. 14 R&B and No. 41 pop), although its sales fell well short of his 1976 PIR debut All Things in Time. Only one single, "See You When I Git There", was released from the album in the US; alongside "You'll Never Find Another Love Like Mine" and "Lady Love", it remains one of Rawls' best-known PIR songs. Like its predecessor, Unmistakably Lou is a well-regarded album for its mix of high-quality Philadelphia soul songs and other more jazz-influenced tracks (atypical and distinctive for a PIR production). Rawls won the Grammy Award for Best Male R&B Vocal Performance for the album in 1978.

In 2005, Unmistakably Lou was reissued by Demon Music in the UK in a double package with All Things in Time.

== Track listing ==
All tracks written by Kenny Gamble and Leon Huff unless stated

1. "See You When I Git There" – 4:43
2. "Spring Again" – 4:29
3. "Early Morning Love" – 5:44
4. "Some Folks Never Learn" – 3:32
5. "Someday You'll Be Old" – 3:43
6. "Secret Tears" (Jack Faith, Phillip Terry) – 4:08
7. "We Understand Each Other" – 4:19
8. "It's Our Anniversary Today" (Dexter Wansel) – 3:42
9. "All the Way" (Jimmy Van Heusen, Sammy Cahn) – 2:44

== Personnel ==
- Lou Rawls - vocals
- Dennis Harris, Roland Chambers - guitars
- Michael Foreman - bass
- Charles Collins - drums
- Larry Washington - bongos, congas
- MFSB - strings, horns

== Singles ==
- "See You When I Git There" (US Pop No. 66, US R&B No. 8)
- "Some Folks Never Learn" (UK/Europe only, not released as a single in the US)

== Charts ==
Chart (1977)	Peak position
Canada Top Albums/CDs (RPM)	58
US Billboard 200	41
US Top R&B/Hip-Hop Albums (Billboard)	14
