= Ad Lib Club =

London nightclub

Coordinates: 51.5115°N 0.1302°W

The Ad Lib Club was a nightclub, made world famous through the patronage of the Beatles, on the fourth floor of 7 Leicester Place over the Prince Charles Theatre in London's Soho district.

The nightclub opened in February 1964. It was noted for its R&B and Soul music, its inclusive atmosphere, its deviation from the traditional club model, its daring decor and its ability to attract the biggest stars of Swinging London.

Mark Lewisohn describes the club as the nightclub "most strongly associated with The Beatles". The Beatles ended their evening at the club following the premiere of A Hard Day's Night in July 1964. Cynthia and John Lennon and George Harrison and Pattie Boyd thought the lift going up to the club was on fire during their first LSD trip in 1965, an event which Harrison called "The Dental Experience". The Beatles had their own table at the club. It was at the club that Ringo Starr proposed to Maureen Cox in January 1965.

The Ad Lib closed in its original location in January 1966 following a legal battle with local residents and the Church of Notre Dame de France over the noise level emitting from the venue. The manager, Brian Morris, unsuccessfully tried to reopen the club in Covent Garden. Another manager, John Kennedy, did re-open the Ad Lib on the site of the 400 Club on Leicester Square in the summer of 1966.

The musician and writer George Melly characterised the relationship between the entertainment and social elite of Swinging London and the rest of Britain's youth as "feudal" with "edicts handed down from the Ad Lib Club ... to the teeny boppers in the outer darkness". The Ad Lib was supplanted in popularity by The Scotch of St. James.

== History ==
The Prince Charles Theatre was a project of Alfred Esdaile, who had run the Prince of Wales Theatre on Coventry Street and the Royal Court Theatre, Sloane Square. Its foundation stone was laid by Dame Flora Robson on 18 December 1961 and it opened for its first performance on 26 December 1962.

The theatre occupied the ground floor; the floors above were intended as offices, flats and a roof garden restaurant.

On 27 December 1962, Nicholas Luard, co-founder of the Establishment Club, along with his business partner, Timothy Willoughby, signed an application to acquire a licence for the nightclub Wips, which opened in late spring 1963. The design of the club was created by Joseph Rykwert, and included a tank of piranhas and faux-fur-lined walls.

Following Willoughby's death at sea in August 1963, and financial difficulties faced by Luard's other ventures, including the Establishment, Private Eye and Scene magazine, Wips closed.

An investment group led by Oscar Lerman and brothers Al and Bob Burnett (whose ventures included the Stork Club and the Pigalle), took on the site of the club which opened as the Ad Lib in February 1964. The Burnetts' nephew, Brian Morris, who had been running the Garrison nightclub at Les Ambassadeurs, was appointed to run the Ad Lib.

Rykwert's designs were largely retained, including the piranhas and fur walls, but more lighting was added, as was a large picture window. The sound system was kept in the carcass of a grand piano.

== Famous patrons ==
All four Beatles were regular patrons of the club along with the Rolling Stones and many of the British groups of the mid-1960s. While at the Ad Lib, the Beatles were introduced to Stephen Sondheim, April Ashley, Roman Polanski, Rudolf Nuryev and others.

David Bailey and Jean Shrimpton were regulars (Shrimpton preferred to knit rather than dance while at the club).

Dirk Bogarde held a party at the Ad Lib for Sybil Burton shortly before she moved to New York, where she opened her own club, Arthur, which borrowed from the aesthetics and attitude of the Ad Lib.
