= Let Me Be Good to You =

Studio album by Lou Rawls
- Released: May 1979
- Recorded: October 1978–February 1979
- Studios: Sigma Sound, Philadelphia, Pennsylvania; Sound Lab, Los Angeles, California; Davlen, Universal City, California
- Genres: Philadelphia soul, jazz
- Length: 37:34
- Label: Philadelphia International
- Producers: Kenny Gamble, Leon Huff, Dexter Wansel, Thom Bell, Jack Faith

Lou Rawls chronology
When You Hear Lou, You've Heard It All (1977)	Let Me Be Good to You (1979)	Sit Down and Talk to Me (1980)

Let Me Be Good to You is an album by the American R&B singer Lou Rawls, released in 1979 on Philadelphia International Records.

The album's lead single, "Let Me Be Good to You", made No. 11 on the R&B chart, while the album peaked at No. 13 R&B. The album peaked at No. 49 on the pop chart.

== Production ==
The production was split between Gamble & Huff, Thom Bell, Dexter Wansel and Jack Faith. New PIR signings the Jones Girls contributed backing vocals to the album, as did the Sweethearts of Sigma.

== Critical reception ==
Professional ratings
Review scores
Source	Rating
AllMusic	3/5 stars
The Encyclopedia of Popular Music	4/5 stars
The New Rolling Stone Record Guide	2/5 stars

AllMusic called Let Me Be Good to You "an above-average album that did much better than anyone thought it would at the time." The Bay State Banner thought that the album "again proves what a fine ballad and soul singer Rawls is," writing that "including one disastrous message song is the only thing that keeps this lp from being a complete triumph."

== Track listing ==
1. "Time Will Take Care of Everything" (Kenny Gamble, Leon Huff) – 4:36
2. "What's the Matter with the World?" (Gamble, Huff) – 5:55
3. "Tomorrow" (Martin Charnin, Charles Strouse) – 3:59
4. "We Keep Getting Closer to Being Farther Apart" (Lillian Lewis, Jack Perricone) – 4:11
5. "Bark, Bite (Fight All Night)" (Thom Bell, LeRoy Bell, Casey James, Jack Robinson) – 4:28
6. "Let Me Be Good to You" (Gamble, Huff) – 5:26
7. "Lover's Holiday" (Dexter Wansel, Cynthia Biggs) – 5:20
8. "Sweet Tender Nights" (Leroy Bell, James) – 3:39

== Singles ==
- "Let Me Be Good to You"
- "What's the Matter with the World"
