= Mickey Deans =

American musician and entrepreneur (1934–2003)

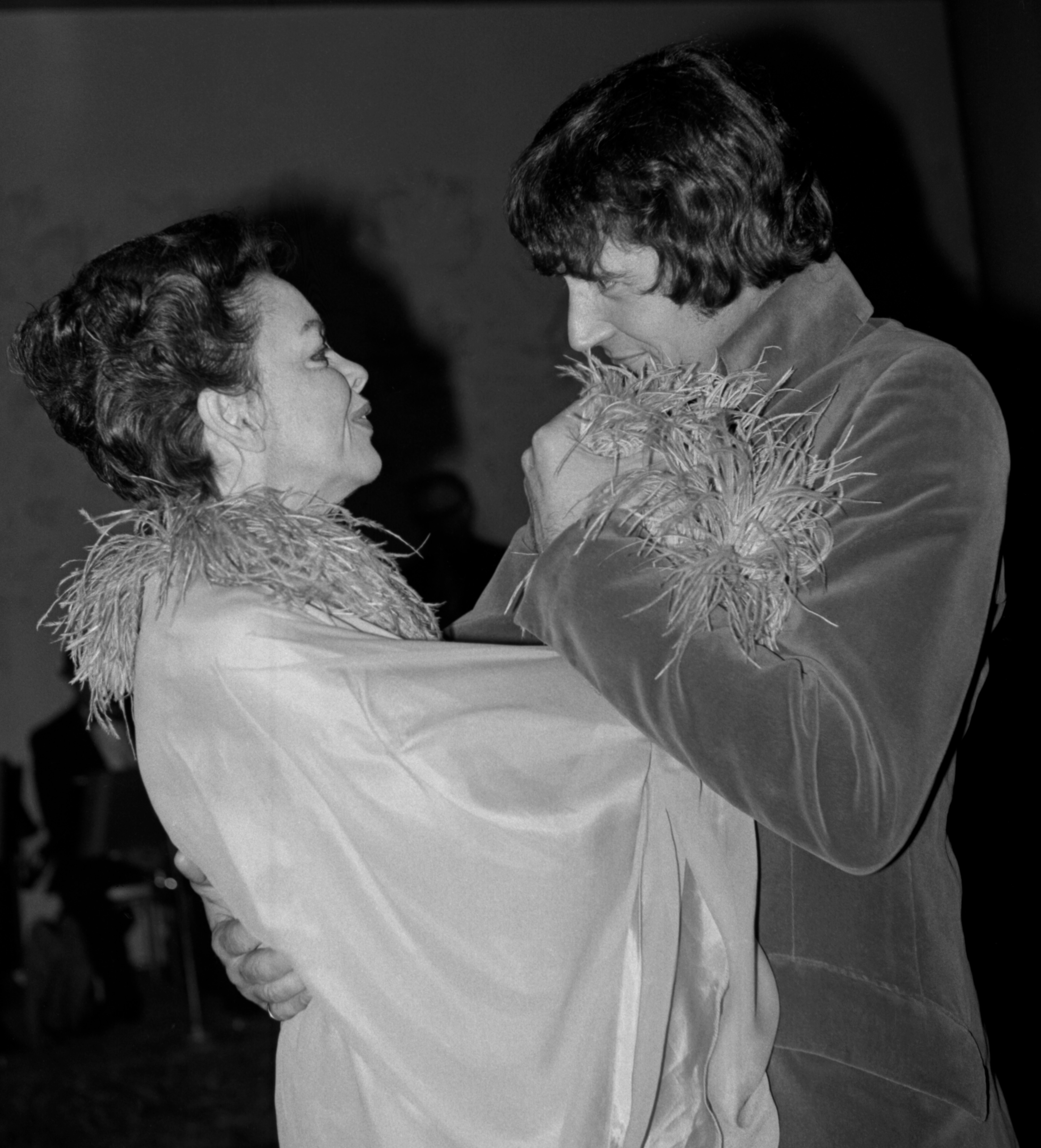
- Deans with Judy Garland on their wedding day in 1969
- Born: Michael DeVinko Jr. September 24, 1934; Garfield, New Jersey, U.S.
- Died: July 11, 2003 (aged 68); Northfield Center, Ohio, U.S.
- Occupations: Musician, entrepreneur
- Years active: 1954–2003
- Spouse: Judy Garland (m. 1969; died 1969)
- Relatives: Liza Minnelli (stepdaughter); Lorna Luft (stepdaughter)

Michael DeVinko Jr. (September 24, 1934 – July 11, 2003), known as Mickey Deans, was an American musician and entrepreneur. Best known as the fifth husband and widower of singer Judy Garland, he acted as Garland's adviser and drug dealer during the final years of her career. He was also the general manager of the New York nightclub Arthur in the 1960s.

== Biography ==
=== Early life and education ===
Mickey Deans was born Mickey DeVinko to Michael and Mary DeVinko in Garfield, New Jersey on September 24, 1934. He graduated from Garfield High School in 1953.

=== Career ===
Deans reportedly held a series of jobs, including vacuum salesman, ice cream vendor, beautician, U.S. Army musician, and rock-and-roll pianist. He began playing piano at a young age, performing with local bands. During the 1950s and 1960s, he worked as a musician at Jilly's, a popular nightclub on West 52nd Street in Manhattan. He also performed in Los Angeles, Reno, Miami Beach, and the Virgin Islands.

Deans became the general manager of the Manhattan discothèque Arthur, owned by Sybil Burton, on East 54th Street, soon after it opened in 1965. Warhol superstar Jay Johnson later alleged that Deans, whom he described as homosexual, attempted to sexually assault him during his employment at Arthur.

=== Life with Judy Garland ===
Deans first met Garland at her hotel in New York City on March 10, 1967. A mutual friend of theirs asked Deans to deliver a package of amphetamines to Garland's room in the St. Regis. He was dressed as a doctor, and he "delivered the medication she needed to get herself together to fly to work on Valley of the Dolls." In her autobiography, Garland's daughter Lorna Luft recalled being introduced in 1967 to a man she believed was "Dr. Deans," and initially felt reassured that her mother had a physician overseeing her prescription drug use. She later learned that he was in fact Mickey Deans, the manager of Arthur nightclub.

Deans and Garland became close as she frequented Arthur. Initially, they joked about marriage before becoming serious. The couple announced their engagement at Merv Griffin's Christmas party in December 1968, before Garland informed her children. They intended to marry later that month, on December 30, in London, but Garland ran into some legal issues with her cabaret act, so they had to delay the wedding. After receiving word of their engagement, Deans' mother told a reporter that she was "too upset to talk about it."

Deans and Garland were finally married on March 15, 1969 in London. Although hundreds of guests were invited to the reception at Quaglino's, only 50 people attended. Liza Minnelli, Garland's eldest child, did not attend, saying, "I can't make it Mamma but I promise I'll come to your next one!" In her book, Garland's daughter Lorna Luft writes that when her mother married Deans, she was in the final stages of prescription drug addiction and "was dying in front of his eyes." Rosalyn Wilder, who worked as a production assistant at Talk of the Town from 1959 to 1979, and who was present at the wedding, describes Deans as the "dreadful man who became her husband. ... I mean if she put an advert in a newspaper for the most unsuitable person to take care of her, she wouldn't have had a better response. ... I don't know what possessed... well, I know what possessed her because he gave in to her and he fed her all the things she wanted."

After the wedding, Deans tried to turn Garland's finances around. He envisioned a documentary and a chain of Judy Garland movie theaters, but neither materialized.

=== Later life ===
Garland's daughter, Lorna Luft, recalled sharing a limousine with Deans after her mother's funeral in 1969. He insisted on stopping at a Manhattan office and it became clear to Lorna that he was striking his book deal only hours after her mother's funeral service. "In a move that takes my breath away to this very day when I think of it, Mickey had scheduled a meeting and wanted me to go along," Lorna wrote, adding that Deans and another man "discussed some sort of business deal" in her presence. "Months later, someone told me the other man was a publisher, and that Mickey had arranged to stop by on the way back from my mother's funeral to cut a deal on a Judy Garland biography. I don't know if it was true, but his book did come out a couple of years later under the title, 'Weep No More, My Lady.' Needless to say, I didn't buy a copy. Mickey Deans. What a putz."

After Garland's death, Deans had a four-year relationship with Rose Driscoll, and they adopted a son, Richard.

Deans was later suspected in the 1983 murder of his boss, Roy Radin.

He moved to Cleveland, Ohio, becoming a producer of police fundraising events. In 1985, he purchased Franklin Castle, a historic four-story stone mansion on Franklin Boulevard in Cleveland for $93,000 and remodeled the home for $2.1 million.

=== Death ===
Deans died in Northfield Center, Ohio, on July 11, 2003, after a long illness. He was 68.

== Books ==
- Deans, Mickey; Pinchot, Ann (1972). Weep No More, My Lady. New York: Hawthorn Books, Inc. ISBN 978-0491009416.
