= Williamstown Theatre Festival =

Resident summer theater in Massachusetts, US

Coordinates: 42.714197°N 73.207075°W

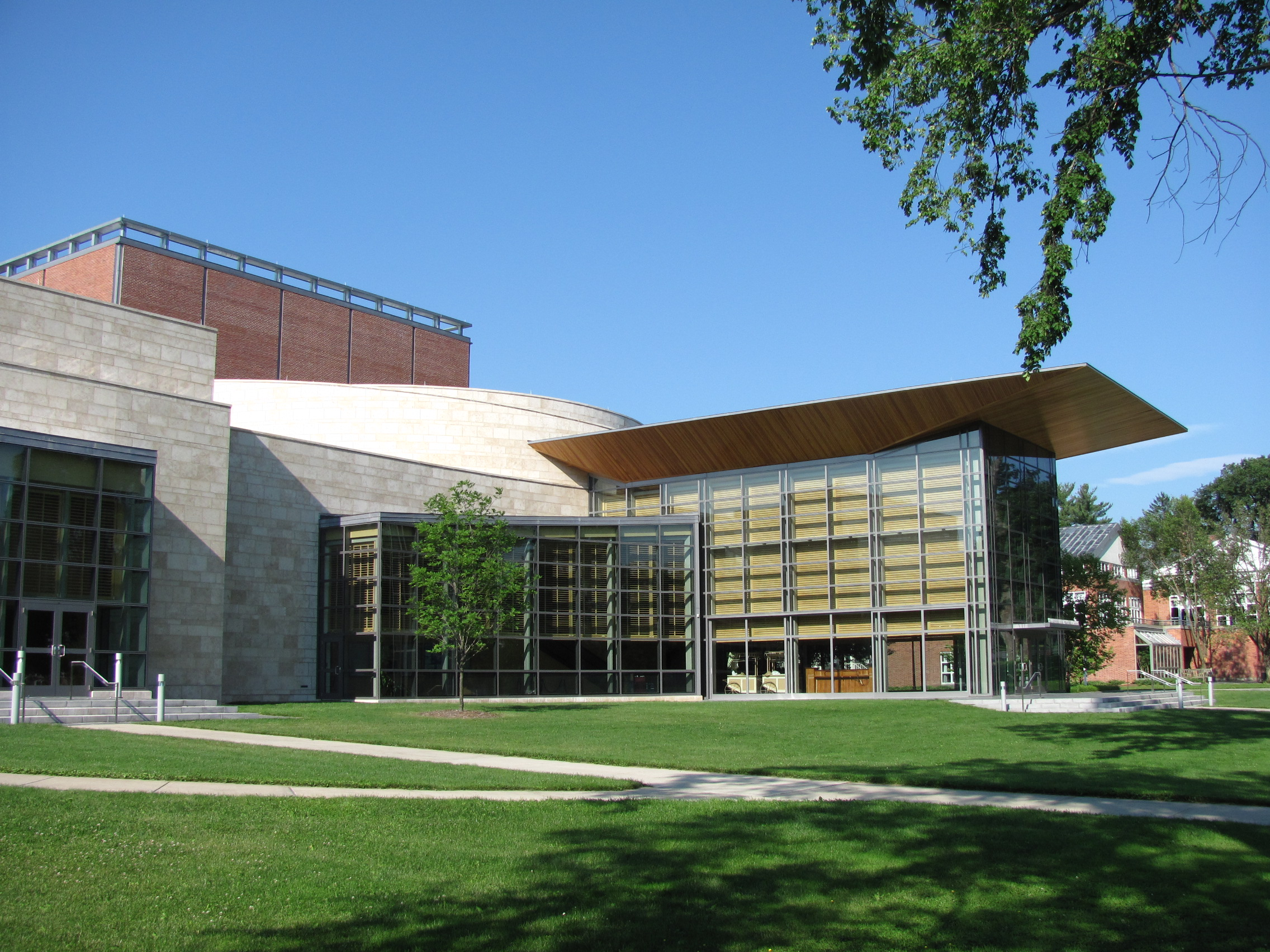
- '62 Center for Theatre & Dance
- Genre: Theatre
- Frequency: Annual
- Locations: Williams College; Williamstown, Massachusetts
- Inaugurated: 1954
- Website: wtfestival.org

The Williamstown Theatre Festival is a resident summer theater on the campus of Williams College in Williamstown, Massachusetts. It was founded in 1954 by Williams College news director Ralph Renzi and drama program chairman David C. Bryant. It was awarded the Regional Theatre Tony Award in 2002 and the Massachusetts Cultural Council Commonwealth Award in 2011.

== History ==
=== Inception ===
The Williamstown Theatre Festival was conceived as a way to use the Adams Memorial Theatre on Williams College campus for a resident theatre company. Marcia Henderson, a Theatre World winner and Williamstown native, performed in the first play of the festival. Her co-star was Canadian actor Jonathan Frid, who portrayed Barnabas Collins on the gothic television serial Dark Shadows. Other notable actors have since participated in the festival, including Sigourney Weaver, Gwyneth Paltrow, Christopher Reeve, Christopher Walken, Peri Gilpin, Nathan Lane, Richard Chamberlain, Charlie Day, Kate Burton, Olympia Dukakis, Paul Giamatti, Bradley Cooper, Calista Flockhart, Matthew Broderick, Jesse Tyler Ferguson, and Uma Thurman.

=== Nikos Psacharopoulos ===
Nikos Psacharopoulos, a professor at Yale Drama School and a co-founder, became the executive artistic director and guided the company for over thirty years. Psacharopoulos made certain WTF would not be a typical summer stock theater by focusing on such international playwrights as Chekhov, George Bernard Shaw, Jean Anouilh, Tennessee Williams, Bertholt Brecht, and Tom Stoppard. He mentored his associates and assistant directors, such as Tom Brennan, Arvin Brown, Keith Fowler, Peter H. Hunt, Paul Weidner, and Austin Pendleton. He attracted well-known actors including E.G. Marshall, Frank Langella, Rosemary Harris, Blythe Danner, and Colleen Dewhurst. Christopher Reeve, once a WTF apprentice and later a frequently-featured actor at the festival, told an interviewer: "By staying here thirty years, Nikos [did] what they couldn't do in Brooklyn or Washington or at Lincoln Center. He has managed to achieve a national theater."

=== Recent (1989 - present) ===
Psacharopoulos died in 1989. Following a 35th season run by a troika of Peter H. Hunt, Austin Pendleton and George Morfogen, Hunt was named artistic director in 1990 for the 36th season. In 1996, long-time WTF stage manager Michael Ritchie became the head of the festival, and during his eight years at the helm, nearly two dozen productions transferred to Broadway, Off-Broadway and regional theaters across the country. Ritchie was succeeded in 2005 by Roger Rees. Former WTF resident director Nicholas Martin served as artistic director from 2008 to 2010. Former Associate Producer Jenny Gersten served as artistic director from 2011 to 2014. Mandy Greenfield served as artistic director from 2014 to 2021. Following Greenfield's resignation, Greenfield's predecessor Jenny Gersten was named Interim Artistic Director.

In 2002, the WTF received the Regional Theatre Tony Award for Excellence in Theater from the American Theater Wing. In 2005, the festival held its inaugural season in the '62 center for Theater and Dance, which replaced the Adams Memorial Theatre.

The festival transferred several shows to Broadway, including One Mo' Time, Hedda Gabler, The Man Who Had All the Luck, The Bridges of Madison County, and The Elephant Man.

=== Controversy ===
In July 2021, an audio crew staged a walkout due to unsafe working conditions during a production of the musical "Row". The Los Angeles Times published a subsequent article describing unsafe working conditions, a "toxic work culture," and a history of overworking unpaid technician interns and acting apprentices. This article was based in part on a letter sent by 75 alumni of the festival detailing their experiences and outlining their demands for changes to the treatment of employees, interns, and apprentices. The festival has since restructured its internship and apprenticeship programs.
