= Groovy People =

Groovy People may refer to:

- "Groovy People", a song by Lou Rawls from the album All Things in Time (1976)
- Groovy People, an EP by Marc E. Bassy (2016)
- Groovy People, an album by Leon Huff (2011)
