= A Natural Man (song) =

1971 song by Lou Rawls

Single by Lou Rawls

from the album A Natural Man
- B-side: "Believe in Me"
- Released: May 1971
- Genre: R&B; Pop
- Length: 3:37
- Label: MGM Records
- Songwriters: Bobby Hebb; Sandy Baron
- Producer: Michael Lloyd

Lou Rawls singles chronology
"Win Your Love" (1970)	"A Natural Man" (1971)	"His Song Shall Be Sung" (1972)

"A Natural Man" is a song by American singer Lou Rawls. It was released in May 1971, and featured on his album of the same name, which was released later in the year. Written by Bobby Hebb and Sandy Baron, it was offered to Rawls upon his departure from Capitol Records, after which he was signed to MGM and experienced a brief career revival.

== Composition ==
"A Natural Man", at 3 minutes and 37 seconds long, has a tempo of 112 beats per minute. It is generally in the key of A sharp / B flat major, but the song alternates between different keys.

The song is about the narrator's dissatisfaction with conforming to societal norms of "working 50 years from 9 to 5", "doing something you're told to do with no questions asked", "going along with the program", and "fitting in [and] faking it," as opposed to "[being] happy and free, living and loving for [you]", and "taking life into [your] own hands and making [your] own choices", which he considers to be a "natural man's" way of living.

The medium-paced R&B song, driven largely by piano and horns, opens up with a 35-second spoken word passage. Backing vocals are handled by the Mike Curb Congregation.

== Chart performance and reception ==
"A Natural Man" was a sleeper hit, having been released in May 1971, and debuting on the Bubbling Under Hot 100 for the week of August 14, two weeks before reaching the main Hot 100 at number 86, where it went on to peak at number 17 and chart for a total of eighteen weeks—chart statistics that made it likely to have appeared on the 1971 year-end list, had it not spilled over the projected cutoff in November.

The song was met with a largely positive critical reception. Billboard called it a "potent blues swinger with a clever lyric line [that] should hit hard fast," and Cashbox wrote of it, "Rawls coasts into another fine outing with this top 40/blues/M.O.R. shot [that] echoes the talk-intro of his 'Dead End Street' giant." RPM described the song and its respective album as "very M.O.R.-ish [and] soft-edged [with a] change of pace and restrained production [that] will introduce Rawls to a new public," and "good programming and nifty sales potential".

Bill Kohlhaase of Los Angeles Times wrote that the song is "filled with a warm expressiveness, spiced with volume dramatics and the occasional growled line", and additionally highlighted its "seductive dialogue, which would've made Barry White proud." In a MusicRadar interview, the song was endorsed by Carol Kaye, who called it "one of [her] 10 greatest recordings," and said of it, "This is just a funky tune, a really good feeling. That’s Earl Palmer on the drums. He got a good groove going on, and I locked in with him like you wouldn't believe. And everybody knows, you can’t beat Lou’s voice. He could make any song his own. What a special artist." Washington newspaper The Spokesman-Review called the song "socially conscious".

At the 14th Annual Grammy Awards, the song won Rawls the Grammy Award for Best Male R&B Vocal Performance. Liza Minnelli covered the song for her 1974 album Live at the Winter Garden, and the Dirtbombs for their 2005 compilation album If You Don't Already Have a Look.

== Charts ==
Chart (1971–1972)	Peak position
US Billboard Hot 100	17
US Billboard Hot R&B/Hip-Hop Songs	17
US Billboard Easy Listening	14
