= Arthur (nightclub) =

Nightclub in Manhattan, New York (1965–1969)

Coordinates: 40°45′30″N 73°58′11″W

Arthur was a nightclub at 154 East 54th Street in Midtown Manhattan, New York City from 1965 to 1969. It was operated by Welsh actress Sybil Christopher, who sought to bring a lively, modern discotheque culture to New York. The nightclub quickly became one of the city's hottest social venues during the mid-1960s, attracting celebrities, artists, writers, and the cultural elite.

== History ==
On May 5, 1965, Arthur opened at 154 East 54th Street, the former site of the Stroller's Club, where the first El Morocco was located. Conceived by actress Sybil Burton, former wife of actor Richard Burton, the club was designed as a new kind of nightlife destination that blended high-society glamour with the emerging discothèque culture. She said Arthur would be "the nearest local thing to the Ad Lib," the popular nightclub for the Swinging London set.

The name Arthur was inspired by a joke attributed to musician George Harrison of the Beatles in the film A Hard Day's Night (1964). When asked about his haircut, he replied: '"I call it Arthur." Arthur had an investment of over US$88,000 (Note: Some disagreement between NYT 1966 article stating $82,000 investment, and NYT 1969 article stating $88,000. Typos? Different timing regarding additional investments?) (equivalent to $899,000 in 2025) provided by 88 backers, including prominent figures in entertainment and the arts, such as Julie Andrews, Leonard Bernstein, Mike Nichols, and Rex Harrison. The nightclub's interior was designed by Tony Walton, an art director and production designer for film and theater.

On its opening night, the nightclub drew a high-profile celebrity crowd that included Senator Jacob Javits and his wife Marion, writer Truman Capote, playwright Tennessee Williams, Warhol superstar Baby Jane Holzer, actress Liza Minnelli, and ballet dancer Rudolf Nureyev.

In June 1965, Sybil Burton married singer Jordan Christopher, whom she met when his band the Wild Ones auditioned to become the house band at Arthur. She largely managed Arthur's operations. The nightclub, however, was owned by a corporation in which Edward Villella, star of the New York City Ballet, served as president; actor Roddy McDowall as vice president; and Sybil Christopher as secretary.

By its first anniversary in 1966, friends and stockholders of Establishment Discotheque, Ltd. – which operated the club under the name Arthur – celebrated both the milestone and the full recoupment of the initial investment.

Singer Judy Garland was a frequent patron of Arthur and became close to the nightclub's general manager, Mickey Deans, who also served as an adviser to Arthur International. Garland and Deans announced their engagement during a party at Arthur in December 1968. Warhol superstar Jay Johnson, whose twin brother Jed Johnson was Pop artist Andy Warhol's longtime partner, obtained a job at the club through Warhol's connections. Johnson later alleged that Deans attempted to sexually assault him during his employment at Arthur.

In its final year, business at the club began to decline, despite strong weekend patronage, prompting Christopher to put it up for sale. On June 22, 1969, a private party was held to mark the club's closure. The venue was subsequently purchased for $100,000 (equivalent to $878,000 in 2025) by a group led by Bradley Pierce, the owner of the discothèques Ondine and Salvation, who planned to convert it into a supper club under a new name.
