= Bobby Hebb =

American singer-songwriter (1938–2010)

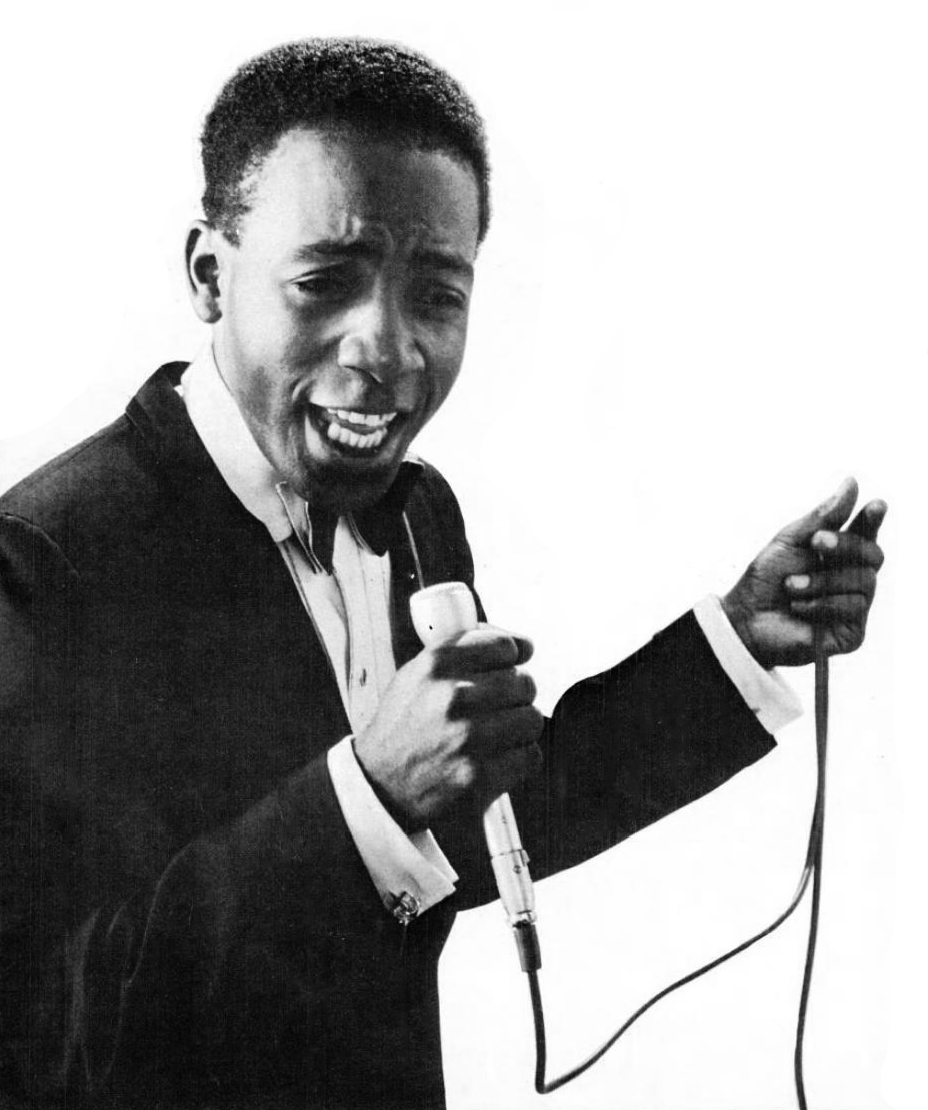
- Hebb in 1966

Background information
- Born: Robert Alvin Von Hebb; July 26, 1938; Nashville, Tennessee, U.S.
- Died: August 3, 2010 (aged 72) Nashville, Tennessee, U.S.
- Genres: R&B, soul
- Occupations: Singer, musician, songwriter
- Instruments: Vocals, piano, guitar
- Years active: 1955‒2010
- Labels: Cadet, Crystal Ball, Epic, Laurie, Mercury, Philips, Scepter, Tuition

Robert Alvin Von Hebb (July 26, 1938 – August 3, 2010) was an American R&B and soul singer, songwriter and musician, best known for his 1966 hit "Sunny".

== Biography ==
=== Early life and family ===
Hebb was born in Nashville, Tennessee. His parents, William and Ovalla Hebb, were both blind musicians. Hebb and his older brother, Harold, performed as a song-and-dance team in Nashville beginning when Bobby was three and Harold was nine.

=== Solo career ===
Hebb performed on a TV show hosted by country music record producer Owen Bradley, which earned him a place with Grand Ole Opry star Roy Acuff. Hebb played spoons and other instruments in Acuff's band. Harold later became a member of "Johnny Bragg and the Marigolds". Bobby Hebb sang backup on Bo Diddley's "Diddley Daddy". Hebb played "West-coast-style" trumpet in a United States Navy jazz band, and replaced Mickey Baker in Mickey and Sylvia.

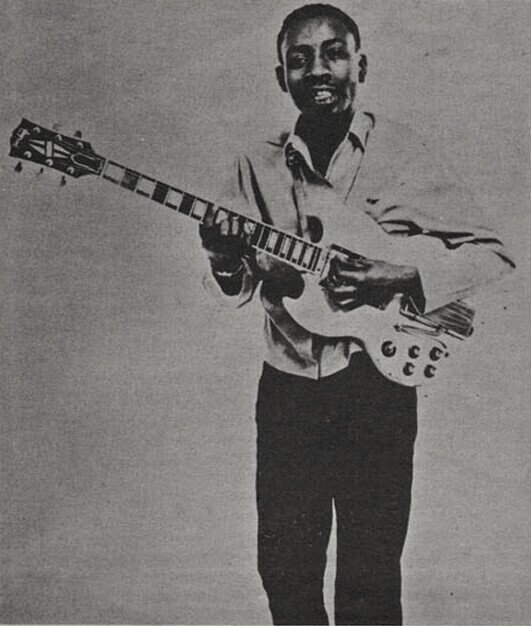
Bobby Hebb posing with guitar, mid-1966

On November 23, 1963, the day after John F. Kennedy's assassination, Bobby Hebb's brother, Harold, was killed in a knife fight outside a Nashville nightclub. Hebb was devastated by both events and sought comfort in songwriting. Though many claim that the song he wrote after both tragedies was the optimistic "Sunny", Hebb himself stated otherwise. He immersed himself in the Gerald Wilson album You Better Believe It! for comfort.

All my intentions were just to think of happier times – basically looking for a brighter day – because times were at a low tide. After I wrote it, I thought "Sunny" just might be a different approach to what Johnny Ray was talking about in "Just Walkin' in the Rain".

"Sunny" was recorded in New York City after demos were made with the record producer Jerry Ross. Released as a single in 1966, "Sunny" reached No. 2 on the Billboard Hot 100, No. 3 on the R&B charts, and No. 12 in the United Kingdom. When Hebb toured with The Beatles in 1966 his "Sunny" was not at the time of the tour, ranked higher than any Beatles song then on the Billboard Hot 100 chart. BMI rated "Sunny" No. 25 in its "Top 100 songs of the century".

In 1976, Hebb released a newly recorded disco version entitled "Sunny '76". The single was a minor hit reaching No. 94 on the R&B chart.

Hebb also had lesser hits with his "A Satisfied Mind" in 1966 (No. 39 on the Billboard chart and No. 40 on the R&B chart) and "Love Me" in 1967 (No. 84), and wrote many other songs, including Lou Rawls' 1971 hit "A Natural Man" (co-written with comedian Sandy Baron). Six years prior to "Sunny", Hebb reached the New York City Top 50 with a remake of Roy Acuff's "Night Train to Memphis". In 1972, his single "Love Love Love" reached No. 32 on the UK charts.

After a recording gap of 35 years, Hebb recorded That's All I Wanna Know, his first commercial release since Love Games for Epic Records in 1970. It was released in Europe in late 2005 by Tuition, a pop indie label. Two new duet versions of "Sunny" were issued, one with Astrid North and the other with Pat Appleton. In October 2008, he toured and played in Osaka and Tokyo in Japan.

Hebb was an active resident of Cresskill, New Jersey.

=== Death ===
Hebb continued to live in his hometown of Nashville, Tennessee, until his death at age 72. On August 3, 2010, Hebb died from lung cancer while being treated at TriStar Centennial Medical Center, located in Nashville. He is interred at Nashville's Spring Hill Cemetery.

== Discography ==
=== Albums ===
- Sunny (1966) – US No. 103, R&B No. 21
- Love Games (1970)
- That's All I Wanna Know (2005)

=== Singles ===
Year	Single	Peak chart positions							
Year	Single	AUS	BE (FLA)	BE (WA)	NL	NZ	UK	US	US R&B
1960	"Night Train to Memphis"	—	—	—	—	—	—	—	—
1961	"Feel So Good"	—	—	—	—	—	—	—	—
1961	"Atlanta G A."	—	—	—	—	—	—	—	—
1966	"Sunny"	18	17	8	2	16	12	2	3
1966	"I Love Mary"	—	—	—	—	—	—	—	—
1966	"Betty Jo from Ohio"	—	—	—	—	—	—	—	—
1966	"A Satisfied Mind"	—	—	—	—	—	65 (Note: Chart position is from the official UK "Breakers List".)	39	40
1966	"Love Me"	—	—	—	—	—	—	84	—
1967	"Ooh La La"	—	—	—	—	—	—	—	—
1967	"Some Kind of Magic" / "I Love Everything About You"	—	—	—	—	—	—	—	—
1967	"Everything is Coming Up Roses"	—	—	—	—	—	—	—	—
1968	"You Want to Change Me"	—	—	—	—	—	—	—	—
1972	"I Was a Boy When You Needed a Man"	—	—	—	—	—	—	—	—
1972	"Love Love Love"	—	—	—	—	—	32	—	—
1974	"Evil Woman"	—	—	—	—	—	—	—	—
1975	"Proud Soul Heritage"	—	—	—	—	—	—	—	—
1975	"Sunny '76"	—	—	—	—	—	—	—	94
2005	"Sunny" (featuring Astrid North)	—	—	—	—	—	—	—	—
"—" denotes releases that did not chart or were not released

== Selected songwriting credits ==
Song	Writer(s)	Recorded versions
"The Charms of the Arms of Love"	Bobby Hebb	Ernie Andrews (1968); Bobby Hebb (1970); Alice Clark (1972)
"Don't You Care"	Bobby Hebb	Alice Clark (1972)
"A Natural Man"	Bobby Hebb; Sandy Baron	Lou Rawls (1971); Larry Morris (1972); Walt Wagner (1972) Liza Minnelli (1974); The Dirtbombs (2001)
"Sunny"	Bobby Hebb	Over 150 versions including: Bobby Hebb (1966); Cher (1966); Booker T. & the M.G.'s (1967); Frank Sinatra (1968); Ella Fitzgerald (1971); Boney M. (1976); Hampton Hawes (1978); Christophe Willem (2006); Toots and the Maytals (2014); Billie Eilish and FINNEAS (2020); Jamie Jones (2021)
"Would You Believe"	Bobby Hebb	Kenny Lonas (1967); William Hunt (1967); Grady Tate (1968)

== Bibliography ==
- Cooper, Daniel (1998). "Bobby Hebb". In The Encyclopedia of Country Music. Paul Kingsbury, Editor. New York: Oxford University Press. p. 235, ISBN 978-0195176087
