= Lou Rawls =

American singer (1933–2006)

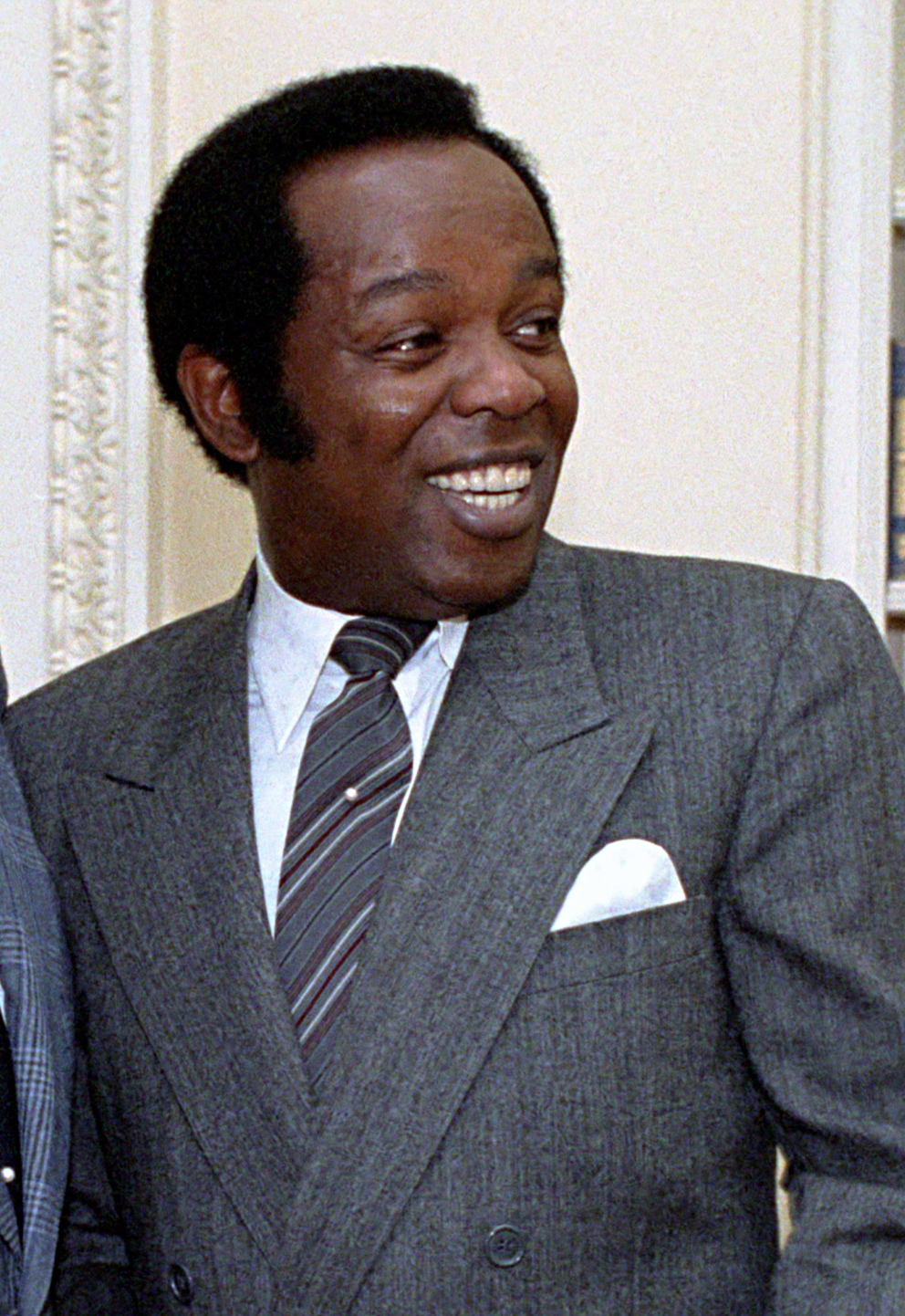
- Rawls in 1984
- Born: Louis Allen Rawls; December 1, 1933; Chicago, Illinois, U.S.
- Died: January 6, 2006 (aged 72); Los Angeles, California, U.S.
- Resting place: Forest Lawn Memorial Park (Hollywood Hills)
- Occupations: Singer; record producer; composer; actor
- Years active: 1941–2005
- Musical career
- Genres: R&B; gospel; soul; jazz; blues
- Instrument: Vocals
- Labels: Candix; Capitol; MGM; Epic; Philadelphia International
- Website: lourawls.com

Louis Allen Rawls (December 1, 1933 – January 6, 2006) was an American baritone singer. He released 61 albums, sold more than 40 million records, and had numerous charting singles, most notably the song "You'll Never Find Another Love Like Mine". He also worked as a film, television, and voice actor. He was a three-time winner of the Best Male R&B Vocal Performance Grammy Award.

== Early life ==
Rawls was born in Chicago on December 1, 1933, and raised by his grandmother in the Ida B. Wells projects on the city's South Side. He began singing in the Greater Mount Olive Baptist Church choir at the age of seven and later sang with local groups through which he met Sam Cooke, who was nearly three years older, and Curtis Mayfield.

== Career ==
After graduating from Dunbar Vocational High School, he sang briefly with Cooke in the Teenage Kings of Harmony, a gospel group, and then with the Holy Wonders. In 1951, he replaced Cooke in the Highway QC's after Cooke departed to join The Soul Stirrers in Los Angeles. Rawls was hired by the Chosen Gospel Singers and moved to Los Angeles, where he joined the Pilgrim Travelers.

In 1955, Rawls enlisted in the United States Army as a paratrooper in the 82nd Airborne Division. He served in B Co 2/505th Parachute Infantry and made 26 jumps. He left the Army three years later as a Sergeant and rejoined the Pilgrim Travelers (then known as the Travelers). In 1958, while touring the South with the Travelers and Sam Cooke, Rawls was in a car crash. He was pronounced dead before arriving at the hospital, where he stayed in a coma for five and a half days. He spent a year recuperating, and it was several months before his memory returned. He considered the crash a life-changing event.

With Dick Clark as master of ceremonies, Rawls was able to perform at the Hollywood Bowl in 1959. His first two singles were "Love, Love, Love" and "Walkin' (For Miles)" for Shar-Dee Records, a label owned by Herb Alpert. In 1960, Rawls recorded "The Waterboy" for Candix Records as Russ Regan and the Rowdies. He also recorded the singles "In My Little Black Book" and "80 Ways" for the label. In July 1961, Rawls was discovered at the Pandora's Box nightclub in Los Angeles by producer Nick Venet, and subsequently signed to Capitol Records.

In 1962, Rawls sang backing vocals on "Bring It On Home to Me" and "That's Where It's At", both written by Cooke. Rawls charted with a cover of "Bring It On Home to Me" in 1970 (with the title shortened to "Bring It On Home").

Soul is truth...no matter where it comes from, no matter how it is presented

— Lou Rawls, 1968 Pop Chronicles interview

Stormy Monday, a jazz album with Les McCann, was released in 1962. The next two Capitol albums (Black and Blue, Tobacco Road) sold well and employed Onzy Matthews as musical director and a 17-piece big band. Both albums reached the Billboard magazine charts and propelled his career.

Although his 1966 album Live! was certified gold, Rawls would not have a star-making hit until he made a soul album, named Soulin' , later that year. The album contained "Love Is a Hurtin' Thing", his first R&B No.1 single. In 1967, he won a Grammy Award for Best R&B Vocal Performance for the single "Dead End Street". In 1967, he performed at the first evening of the Monterey International Pop Music Festival.

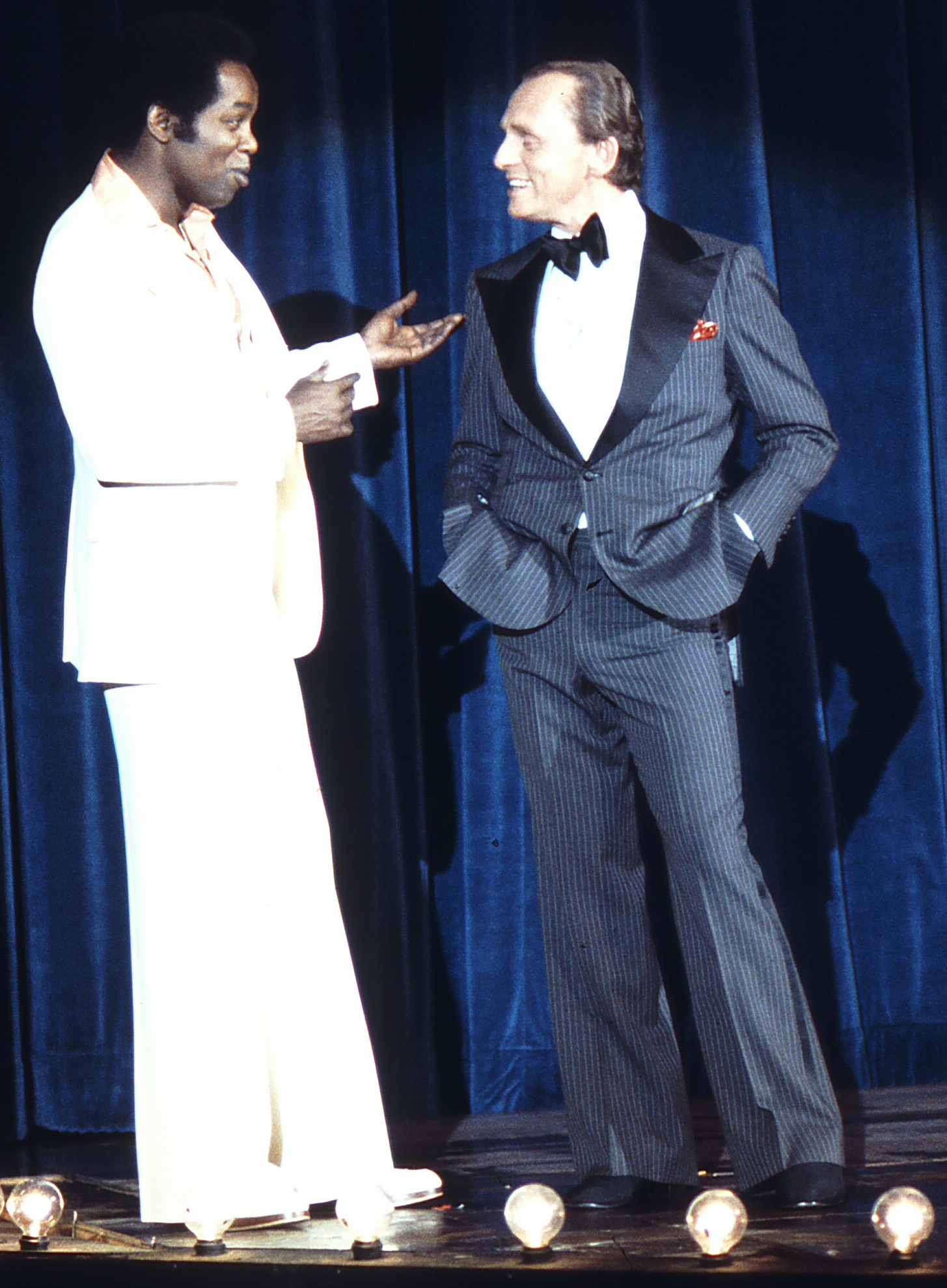
Rawls performing with Frank Gorshin in 1977

In 1969, Rawls was co-host of NBC's summer replacement series for the Dean Martin Show with Martin's daughter, singer Gail Martin. Capitol Records dropped Rawls in 1970. Comedian Sandy Baron and singer Bobby Hebb had a song called "Natural Man" that they wanted the newly unsigned Rawls to sing and convinced Michael Lloyd at MGM to sign Rawls; the song would be a hit for Rawls and briefly revive his career. For Bell Records in 1974 he recorded a cover version of "She's Gone" by Hall & Oates. Two years later with his new manager Martin Pichinson, he signed with Philadelphia International and recorded All Things in Time, which sold a million copies. "You'll Never Find Another Love Like Mine" became his biggest selling single, selling a million copies, topping the R&B and Adult Contemporary charts, and reaching No. 2 on the pop chart. The hit single "Lady Love" followed, from the 1977 album When You Hear Lou, You've Heard It All.

=== Charity ===
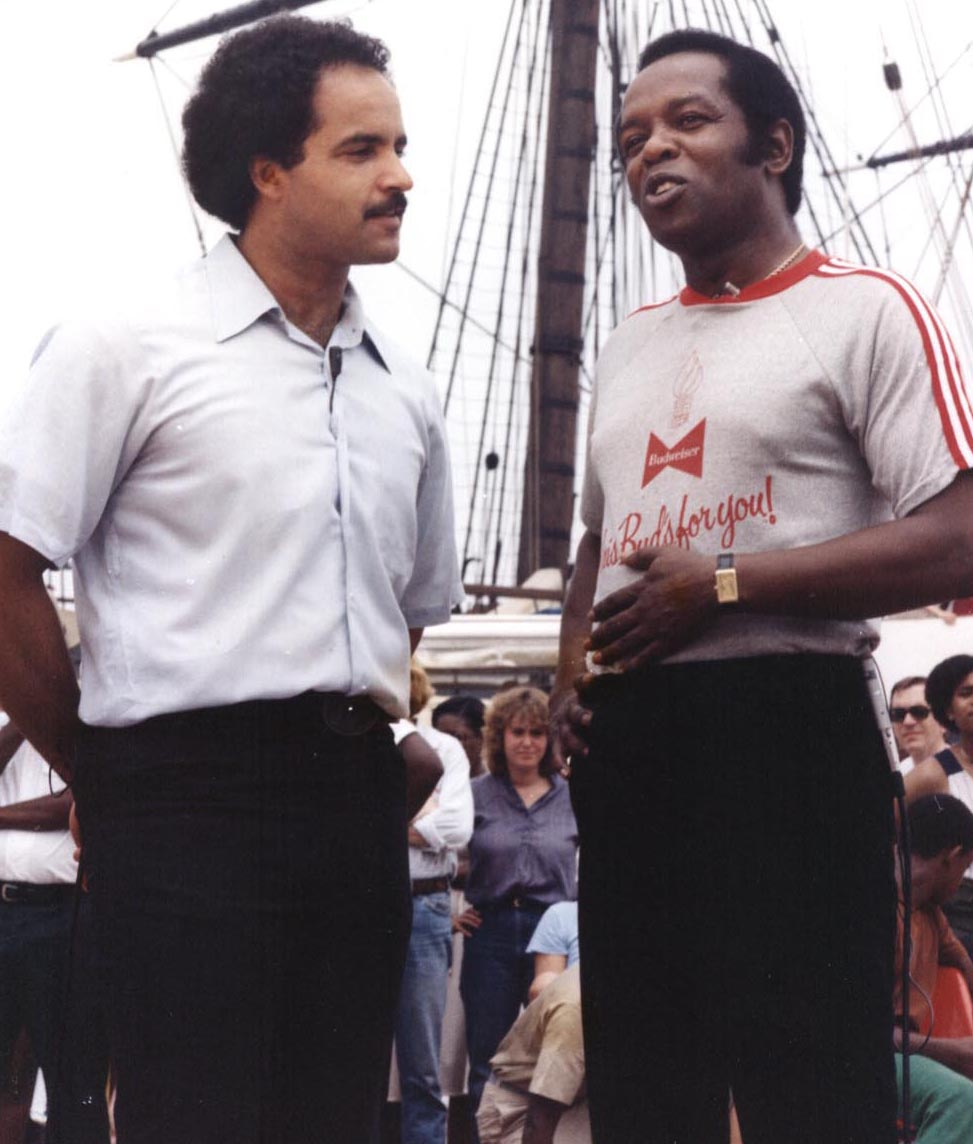
Rawls (right) at Baltimore's Inner Harbor (1980) being interviewed by local news anchor Curt Anderson, promoting the Lou Rawls Parade of Stars Telethon

In 1980, Rawls began the Lou Rawls Parade of Stars Telethon, which benefited the United Negro College Fund. The annual event, known since 1998 as "An Evening of Stars: A Celebration of Educational Excellence", consists of stories of successful Black students who have benefited from and/or graduated from one of the many historically Black colleges and universities that receive support from the UNCF, along with musical performances from various recording artists in support of the UNCF's and Rawls' efforts. The event had raised more than US$250 million for the fund at the time of Rawls' death in 2006.

=== Television and film ===
Rawls appeared in a segment aired during the first season of Sesame Street to sing the alphabet. He dismissed the suggestion to use cue cards for the performance, but reversed his decision when he forgot the order of the letters. He was a guest during the second season of The Muppet Show.

His first acting credit was in the Western television series The Big Valley (starring Barbara Stanwyck, along with Lee Majors and Linda Evans). He was also in the season 5 episode "Lifeline" of the television show Mannix and the season 6 episode "Return to the Cotton Club" of the show Fantasy Island. He appeared in the films Leaving Las Vegas; Blues Brothers 2000; and Angel, Angel, Down We Go. He had a role and sang in Lookin' Italian (1994), an independent film about the mafia. He had a supporting role in Baywatch Nights. He was a guest host on Jazz Central, a television program that was broadcast on the BET channel.

For many years, he was a spokesperson for the Colonial Penn Life Insurance Company. He appeared in television and radio commercials in the mid-to-late 1960s for Spur Malt Liquor, a Rainier Brewing Company product in Seattle. He appeared in a number of Budweiser advertisements, which was also a sponsor of the Rawls telethon and UNCF. There was no attempt to avoid the similarity between the title of the 1977 album When You've Heard Lou, You've Heard It All and his corporate sponsor's slogan "When You Say Bud, You've Said It All". A track on the 1978 album Lou Rawls Live features him singing the commercial slogan. Anheuser-Busch, the brewers of Budweiser, suggested his telethon work to him.

Rawls lent his rich baritone to cartoons, including Hey Arnold!, Garfield, Captain Planet and the Planeteers and The Proud Family. For many of the Film Roman Garfield specials, Rawls would often compose songs, which he would then sing (usually doing a duet with Desirée Goyette), as well as the singing voice of the title character himself.

In the season 2 episode of My Wife and Kids entitled "Michael's Garden", Lou Rawls himself sings "You'll Never Find Another Love Like Mine" to Michael Kyle (Damon Wayans) during a colonoscopy.

== Personal life ==
Rawls was married three times. His third wife, Nina, a former flight attendant, managed his career during his last two years. They had one son, Aiden Rawls. He was also survived by another son, Lou Rawls Jr. (deceased 2023); two daughters, Louanna Rawls and Kendra Smith (both of Los Angeles); and four grandchildren.

== Death ==
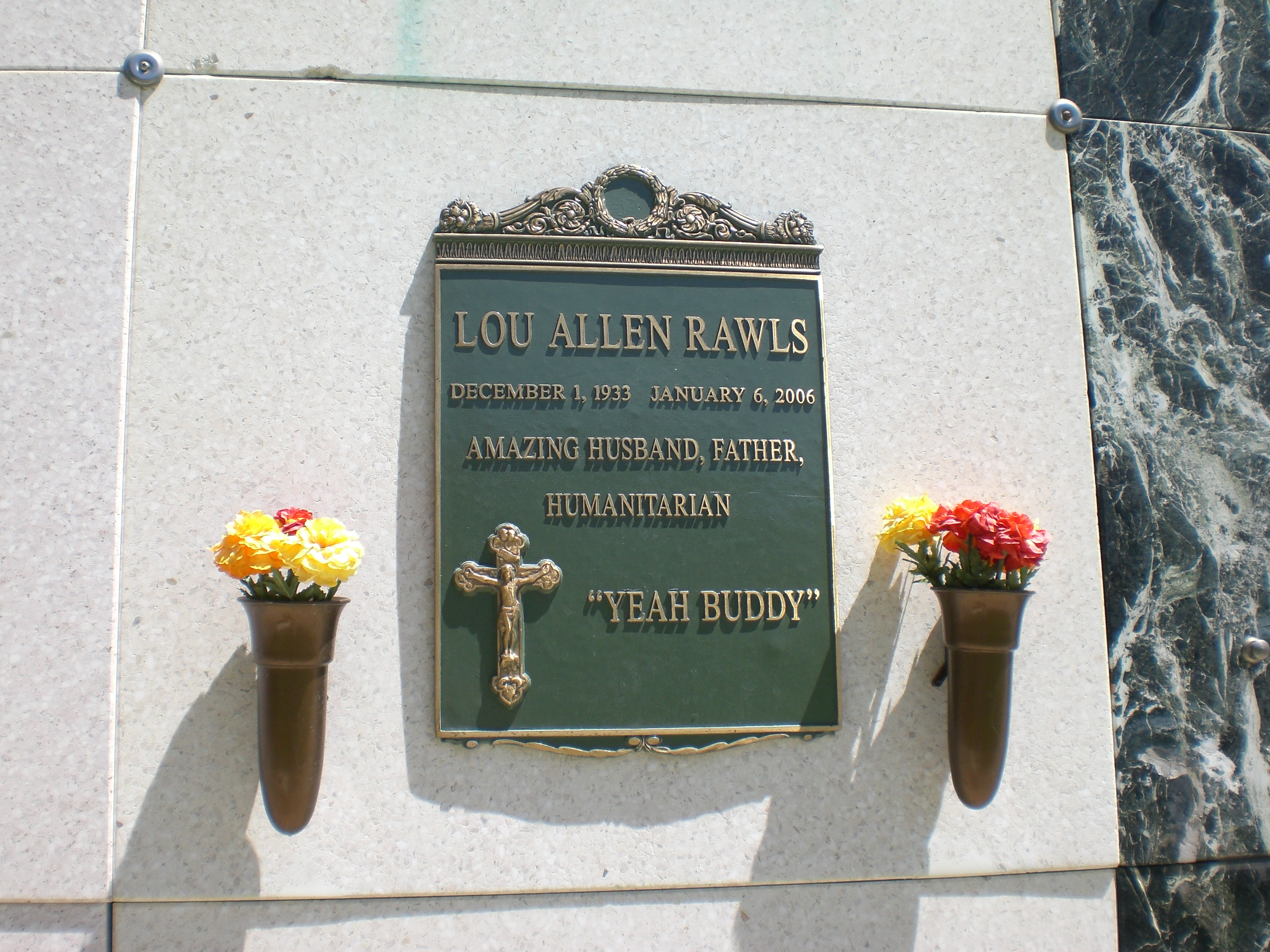
Lou Rawls's outdoor mausoleum crypt at Forest Lawn Memorial Park (Hollywood Hills)

In December 2005, it was announced that Rawls was being treated for lung cancer that metastasized to his brain. He died from this illness on January 6, 2006, at Cedars-Sinai Medical Center in Los Angeles, California. Little Richard and David Hasselhoff attended his funeral. He is entombed at Forest Lawn Memorial Park (Hollywood Hills).

Lou Rawls's final television performance occurred during the 2005–2006 edition of his telethon, honoring Stevie Wonder in September 2005, months before entering the hospital and after having been diagnosed with cancer earlier in the year. He performed "You Are the Sunshine of My Life" and "It Was a Very Good Year" as a tribute to Frank Sinatra.

== Awards and honors ==
On the night of September 29, 1977, Rawls performed the national anthem of the United States before the Earnie Shavers-Muhammad Ali title fight at Madison Square Garden. He was invited to sing the anthem many times over the next 28 years. His final performance was in his hometown of Chicago when he was asked to sing the national anthem before the second game of the 2005 World Series between the Chicago White Sox and Houston Astros at U.S. Cellular Field.

Rawls won the AMA for Favorite Soul/R&B Male Artist in 1979, tied with singer Teddy Pendergrass.

In 1982, Rawls received a star on the Hollywood Walk of Fame. On January 19, 1985, he sang "Wind Beneath My Wings" at the nationally televised 50th Presidential Inaugural Gala the day before the second inauguration of Ronald Reagan.

In 2021, Rawls was posthumously inducted into the Rhythm & Blues Hall of Fame.

=== Grammy Awards ===
Year	Nominee / work	Award	Result
1968	"Dead End Street"	Best Male R&B Vocal Performance	Won
1972	"A Natural Man"	Best Male R&B Vocal Performance	Won
1976	"You'll Never Find Another Love Like Mine"	Best Male Pop Vocal Performance	Nominated
1978	Unmistakably Lou	Best Male R&B Vocal Performance	Won

== Legacy ==
Guion Bluford, the first African-American astronaut, brought the Lou Rawls album When the Night Comes (Epic/CBS, 1983) into space with him. It contained the song "Wind Beneath My Wings". In 1989, he performed vocals for "The Music and Heroes of America" segment in the animated television miniseries This Is America, Charlie Brown.

In January 2004, Rawls was honored by the United Negro College Fund for his more than 25 years of charity work with the organization. Instead of hosting and performing as he usually did, Rawls was given the seat of honor and celebrated by his performing colleagues, including Stevie Wonder, The O'Jays, Gerald Levert, and Ashanti.

In 2009, Pathway Entertainment announced its intention to produce a biopic about Rawls's life, tentatively titled Love Is a Hurtin' Thing: The Lou Rawls Story, with Rawls' son, Lou Rawls Jr., writing the screenplay and Isaiah Washington reportedly playing Rawls.

== Discography ==
=== Albums ===
- Stormy Monday with Les McCann (Capitol, 1962)
- Black and Blue (Capitol, 1963)
- Tobacco Road (Capitol, 1964)
- Nobody But Lou (Capitol, 1965)
- Lou Rawls and Strings (Capitol, 1965)
- Live! (Capitol, 1966)
- Soulin' (Capitol, 1966)
- Carryin' On! (Capitol, 1966)
- Too Much! (Capitol, 1967)
- That's Lou (Capitol, 1967)
- Merry Christmas Ho! Ho! Ho! (Capitol, 1967)
- Feelin' Good (Capitol, 1968)
- You're Good for Me (Capitol, 1968)
- Central Park Music Festival with Ramsey Lewis, Maxine Brown (Music Images, 1968)
- Come On in, Mister Blues (Pickwick, 1968)
- The Way It Was, The Way It Is (Capitol, 1969)
- Your Good Thing (Capitol, 1969)
- You've Made Me So Very Happy (Capitol, 1970)
- Bring It On Home...and Other Great Sam Cooke Hits (Capitol, 1970)
- Natural Man (MGM, 1971)
- Silk & Soul (MGM, 1972)
- A Man of Value (MGM, 1972)
- The Soul of Nigger Charley with Don Costa (MGM, 1973)
- Live at the Century Plaza (MGM, 1973)
- She's Gone (Bell, 1974)
- Lou Rawls with Host Sam Riddle (Sounds Like The Navy, 1974)
- All Things in Time (Philadelphia International, 1976)
- Naturally (Polydor, 1976)
- Unmistakably Lou (Philadelphia International, 1977)
- When You Hear Lou, You've Heard It All (Philadelphia International, 1977)
- Live (Philadelphia International, 1978)
- Let Me Be Good to You (Philadelphia International, 1979)
- Sit Down and Talk to Me (Philadelphia International, 1980)
- Shades of Blue (Philadelphia International, 1981)
- Here Comes Garfield (Epic, 1982)
- Now Is the Time (Epic, 1982)
- When the Night Comes (Epic, 1983)
- Close Company (Epic, 1984)
- Trying As Hard As I Can (Allegiance, 1984)
- Holiday Cheer with Lena Horne (Capitol, 1985)
- Love All Your Blues Away (Epic, 1986)
- Family Reunion (Gamble and Huff 1987)
- At Last (Blue Note, 1989)
- It's Supposed to Be Fun (Blue Note, 1990)
- Portrait of the Blues (Manhattan, 1993)
- Christmas Is the Time (Manhattan, 1993)
- Seasons 4 U (Rawls & Brokaw, 1998)
- Classic Soul (TKO Magnum Music, 1999)
- Swingin' Christmas (EMI-Capitol, 2000)
- I'm Blessed (Malaco, 2001)
- Rawls Sings Sinatra (Savoy, 2003)
- Christmas (Hy-Lo, 2004)

=== Charting singles ===
Year	Single	Chart Positions			
Year	Single	US Pop	US R&B	US AC	UK
1965	"Three O'Clock in the Morning"	83	—	27	—
1966	"The Shadow of Your Smile"	—	33	—	—
1966	"Love Is a Hurtin' Thing"	13	1	—	—
1966	"You Can Bring Me All Your Heartaches"	55	35	—	—
1967	"Trouble Down Here Below"	92	—	—	—
1967	"Dead End Street"	29	3	—	—
1967	"Show Business"	45	25	—	—
1967	"Little Drummer Boy"	—	—	—	—
1968	"Down Here on the Ground"	69	—	—	—
1969	"Your Good Thing (Is About to End)"	18	3	35	—
1969	"I Can't Make It Alone"	63	33	—	—
1970	"You've Made Me So Very Happy"	95	32	31	—
1970	"Bring It On Home"	96	45	—	—
1971	"A Natural Man"	17	17	14	—
1972	"His Song Shall Be Sung"	—	44	—	—
1972	"Walk On In"	—	—	34	—
1974	"She's Gone"	—	81	—	—
1976	"You'll Never Find Another Love like Mine"	2	1	1	10
1976	"Groovy People" / "This Song Will Last Forever"	64 —	19; 74	19	— —
1977	"See You When I Git There"	66	8	—	—
1978	"Lady Love"	24	21	5	—
1978	"One Life to Live"	—	32	10	—
1978	"There Will Be Love"	—	76	33	—
1979	"Let Me Be Good to You"	—	11	—	—
1979	"Sit Down and Talk to Me"	—	26	—	—
1980	"You're My Blessing"	77	—	—	—
1980	"Ain't That Loving You (for More Reasons than One)"	—	57	—	—
1980	"I Go Crazy"	—	37	—	—
1982	"Will You Kiss Me One More Time"	—	54	—	—
1983	"Wind Beneath My Wings"	65	60	10	—
1984	"All Time Lover"	—	67	—	—
1985	"Learn to Love Again"	—	71	—	—
1986	"Stop Me from Starting This Feeling"	—	—	—	80
1987	"I Wish You Belonged to Me"	—	28	—	—
"—" denotes a recording that did not chart or was not released in that territory.

== Filmography ==
- 1969: Angel, Angel, Down We Go as Joe
- 1969: "Joshua Watson" The Big Valley
- 1972: "Mannix" Lifeline Episode as Vance Logan
- 1978: The Muppet Show Guest Star
- 1995: Leaving Las Vegas as Concerned Cab Driver
- 1996-2004: Hey Arnold as Harvey the Mailman (18 episodes)
- 1996: Driven as Charlie
- 1997: Only in America (Don King HBO Movie)
- 1997: "Still Breathing" as The Tree Man
- 1997: "The Wall: Part 2" (1 episode) Early Edition
- 1998: The Secret Files of the Spy Dogs (voice of Anubis)
- 1998: The Rugrats Movie as a newborn baby singer
- 1998: Blues Brothers 2000 as a member of The Louisiana Gator Boys band
- 1999: KaBlam! as himself
- 2000: Jazz Channel Presents Lou Rawls (Image)
- 2001: My Wife and Kids Episode: "Michael's Garden" (himself)
- 2002: The Proud Family Episode The Party
- 2002: The District Episode Explicit Activities
- 2003: In Concert (BMG/Image)
- 2005: Prime Concerts: In Concert with Edmonton Symphony (Amalgamated)
- 2005: South Park as Tolkien Black (singing voice; archival synthase recording) Episode: "Wing"
- 2006: The Lou Rawls Show: With Duke Ellington & Freda Payne
- 2007: Live in Concert: North Sea Jazz. 1992-1995 (E-M-S)
