= Angel, Angel, Down We Go =

1969 film by Robert Thom

- Film poster
- Directed by: Robert Thom
- Written by: Robert Thom
- Produced by: Jerome F. Katzman
- Starring: Jennifer Jones; Jordan Christopher; Roddy McDowall
- Cinematography: John F. Warren
- Edited by: Eve Newman
- Music by: Barry Mann; Cynthia Weil
- Production company: Four Leaf Productions
- Distributed by: American International Pictures
- Release date: November 26, 1969
- Running time: 93 minutes
- Country: United States
- Language: English

Angel, Angel, Down We Go, also known as Cult of the Damned, is a 1969 American film directed by playwright and screenwriter Robert Thom, in his sole directorial credit, and starring Jennifer Jones, Jordan Christopher, Holly Near, and Roddy McDowall. Thom based his screenplay on an unproduced stage play of the same title that he had written several years earlier as a vehicle for his wife, actress Janice Rule. The film was produced by Sam Katzman's Four Leaf Productions and distributed by American International Pictures.

== Plot ==
The overweight, emotionally troubled daughter of an affluent but brittle Hollywood couple becomes involved with a charismatic rock singer and his friends. The singer proceeds to seduce and manipulate her entire family.

== Cast ==
- Jennifer Jones as Astrid Steele
- Jordan Christopher as Bogart Peter Stuyvesant
- Holly Near as Tara Steele
- Lou Rawls as Joe
- Charles Aidman as Willy Steele
- Davey Davison as Anna Livia
- Roddy McDowall as Santoro

== Production ==
In August 1960, Thom, best known for writing the film Compulsion, announced he would direct a play titled Angel Angel Down We Go starring his wife, Janice Rule. It would be presented by Leland Hayward in December and was about a group of New York University students in Greenwich Village. By November, Hayward halted production because he had been unable to find a director and a theater. In August 1961, the play was acquired by Theatrical Interests Plan. In September 1962, Shirley Knight was announced as the star.

The Broadway production did not occur but Thom transformed his play into a film script. Film rights were bought by Sam Katzman, who procured financing from AIP. Jennifer Jones signed in December 1968 and filming began on February 18, 1969.

The part of the daughter was played by Holly Near, who had not planned to be a film actress but was invited to audition after appearing at an awards event. "I got the part because I was beautiful and because I was fat," recalled Near in her memoir, adding that Thom had asked her to gain weight for the role. Near said that Jones "was the grand dame that she deserved to be. I watched her struggle with her part, with her role, with her fear. I felt like an ugly duckling next to an aging swan." Near felt that Thom "didn't have much compassion for my character ... I struggled to give her dignity where there was none ... I always wondered why Robert wanted to make this film."

== Songs ==
The songs in the film, "Angel Angel Down We Go", "The Fat Song", "Hey Hey Hey and a Hi Ho", "Lady Lady", "Mother Lover" and "Revelation," were written by Barry Mann and Cynthia Weil and were sung by Jordan Christopher.

== Reception ==
The Los Angeles Times called the film "a pretentious mess" although "it can never be said to bore."

The New York Times described the film as "an unmitigated financial disaster."

AIP rereleased the film as Cult of the Damned in 1970. It was issued on a double bill with The Vampire Lovers. The Los Angeles Times called it "a terrible piece of trash."

== In popular culture ==
The fifth track on Morrissey's 1988 debut solo album Viva Hate is titled "Angel, Angel Down We Go Together."

== See also ==
- List of American films of 1969

== Sources ==
- Near, Holly; Richardson, Derk (1990). Fire in the rain-- singer in the storm : an autobiography. W. Morrow.
