= Gale Dixon =

American actress

Gale Dixon was an American actress and singer who had a brief but active career in theatre, television, and film from the late 1960s through the mid-1970s. She made her Broadway debut in 1966 as Francine in Robert Fisher and Arthur Marx's The Impossible Years.

She returned to Broadway two years later to appear as Millie in the original production of John Sebastian's Jimmy Shine, sharing the stage with Dustin Hoffman and Rue McClanahan. In 1969 she portrayed the role of Lorry, the mother of a kidnapped child, in her first film The Tree.

In 1970, Dixon returned to Broadway as Noelle in Alan Jay Lerner and André Previn's musical Coco with actress Katharine Hepburn. She next guest starred on the television series Nichols in the episode "Bertha" (1972). She also appeared in the television movie Katherine with Sissy Spacek and Henry Winkler in 1975.
