= The Fat Spy =

1966 film directed by Joseph Cates

- 1966 theatrical poster
- Directed by: Joseph Cates
- Written by: Matthew Andrews
- Produced by: Everett Rosenthal; Rick Pleven
- Starring: Phyllis Diller; Jack E. Leonard; Brian Donlevy; Jayne Mansfield; Linda Harrison
- Cinematography: Joseph C. Brun
- Edited by: Barry Malkin
- Music by: Joel Hirschhorn; Al Kasha
- Distributed by: Magna Pictures Distribution Corporation; Troma Entertainment
- Release date: May 11, 1966
- Running time: 80 minutes
- Country: United States
- Language: English

The Fat Spy is a 1966 Z movie that attempts to parody teenage beach party films rather than spy films. It is featured in the 2004 documentary The 50 Worst Movies Ever Made. Briefly released to theaters in 1966, it was rarely seen until the 1990s, when it was released to the public domain. Since then it has been widely released on DVD and VHS in various editions sold mainly at dollar stores.

The film was shot on location in Cape Coral, Florida, according to the book Images of America: Cape Coral (Arcadia Publishing, 2009) written by members of the Cape Coral Historical Society. Featured in the film is Cape Coral Gardens, a popular public rose garden during the early 1960s, which was known for a series of quaint, interconnected footbridges. The tourist attraction no longer exists.

== Plot ==
A mostly deserted island, which is believed to be the home to the fountain of youth, lies off the coast of Florida. The island gets some visitors in the form of a teenage rock band, The Wild Ones, and their gang of swimsuit-clad young people, including Frankie (Jordan Christopher) and Nanette (Lauree Berger), and their sidekick Dodo (Johnny Tillotson). The gang heads there in a crowded powerboat, ostensibly for a scavenger hunt. However, they spend about half their screen time crooning to each other, or dancing on the beach.

The island's wealthy owner, George Wellington (Brian Donlevy), recruits his daughter, Junior (a then-pregnant Jayne Mansfield), to remove the teenagers from the island. Junior is eager to see her love interest (and the island's only resident), rotund toupee-wearing botanist Irving (Jack E. Leonard). However, Irving is more interested in flowers and his bicycle than in the amorous Junior. Wellington asks Irving to spy on the teenagers, which he does by donning a sweatshirt that reads "Fink University", and "getting their trust" by joining them in dancing the Turtle. Meanwhile, Irving's twin brother Herman (also Jack E. Leonard, without a toupee), Wellington's trusted employee, plots with his love interest, the scheming Camille Salamander (Phyllis Diller), to find the fountain of youth first.

== Cast ==
- Jack E. Leonard as Irving and Herman
- Brian Donlevy as George Wellington
- Phyllis Diller as Camille Salamander
- Jayne Mansfield as Junior Wellington
- Johnny Tillotson as Dodo Bronk
- Jordan Christopher as Frankie
- Lauree Berger as Nanette
- The Wild Ones as Themselves
- Lou Nelson as Punjab the Sikh
- Toni Lee Shelly as Naomi the Mermaid
- Penny Roman as The Secretary
- Chuck Alden as Treasure Hunter
- Eddie Wright as Treasure Hunter
- Tommy Graves as Treasure Hunter
- Tommy Trick as Treasure Hunter
- Linda Harrison as Treasure Hunter

== Soundtrack ==
- "Wild Way of Living" – written by Chuck Alden and Jordan Christopher, performed by Jordan Christopher and The Wild Ones
- "People Sure Act Funny" – written by Chuck Alden and Jordan Christopher, performed by Jordan Christopher and Chuck Alden
- "I'd Like To Be a Rose In Your Garden (But I'm Just a Thorn in Your Side)" – written by Joel Hirschhorn, Al Kasha and Hank Hunter, performed by Jayne Mansfield
- "Where Is The Girl For Me" – performed by Johnny Tillotson
- "If I See You Again – performed by Johnny Tillotson
- "You Put Me Down The Nicest Way You Can" – performed by Lauree Berger
- "C'mon Down" – performed by Jordan Christopher and The Wild Ones

== See also ==
- List of American films of 1966
