= Kate Burton (actress) =

British and American actress (born 1957)

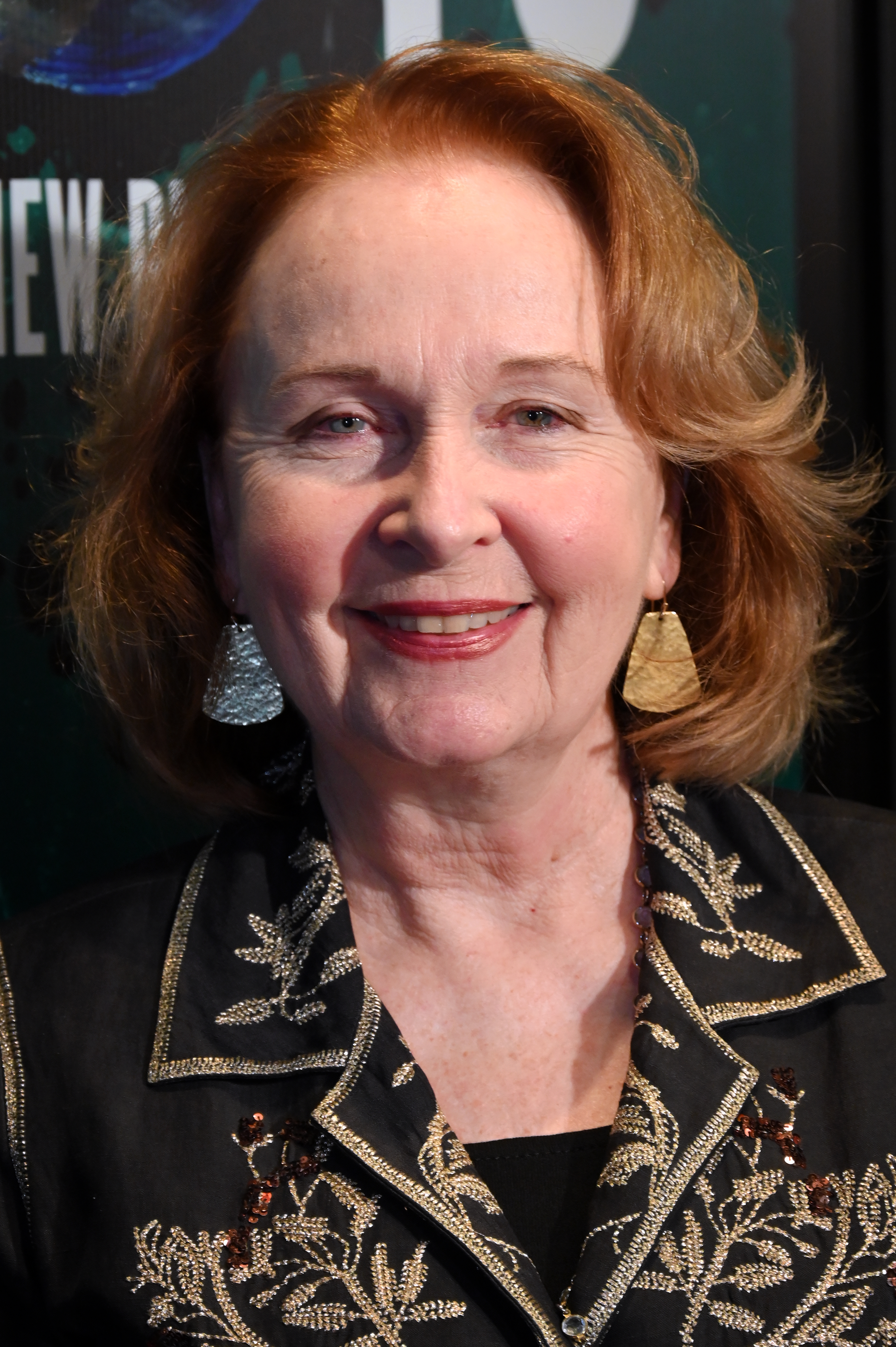
- Burton in 2025
- Born: Katherine Burton; September 10, 1957 (age 69); Geneva, Switzerland
- Citizenship: United Kingdom; United States
- Education: Brown University (BA); Yale University (MFA)
- Occupation: Actress
- Years active: 1982–present
- Spouse: Michael Ritchie (m. 1985)
- Children: 2
- Parents: Richard Burton (father); Sybil Christopher (mother)

Katherine Burton (born September 10, 1957) is an American actress, the daughter of actors Richard Burton and Sybil Christopher. On television, Burton received critical acclaim as Dr. Ellis Grey in the drama series Grey's Anatomy, and as Vice President Sally Langston on Scandal. She has been nominated for three Primetime Emmy Awards and three Tony Awards.

== Early life ==
Burton was born in Geneva, Switzerland, the daughter of Welsh parents, producer Sybil Burton (née Williams) and actor Richard Burton. She was thus the stepdaughter of Elizabeth Taylor and of Sybil's second husband Jordan Christopher, both actors. Burton earned a bachelor's degree in Russian Studies and European History from Brown University in 1979, where she was on the board of Production Workshop, one of the university's student theatre groups, and a master's degree from Yale School of Drama in 1982. Brown awarded Burton an honorary doctorate in 2007.

== Career ==
=== Stage work ===
Burton's first notable role on Broadway was in a 1982 production of the Noël Coward play Present Laughter directed by George C. Scott. The following year, she appeared as J.J. in the Broadway musical Doonesbury. Burton also appeared as Alice in Eva Le Gallienne's Alice in Wonderland on Broadway, produced by The Mirror Theater Ltd's Sabra Jones. Several key roles followed, including roles in Wendy Wasserstein's An American Daughter and Martin McDonagh's The Beauty Queen of Leenane.

In 2002, she received Tony Award nominations in separate performance categories: Best Actress in a Play, for her portrayal of the title role in Henrik Ibsen's Hedda Gabler, and Best Featured Actress in a Play for her portrayals of Pinhead/Mrs. Kendal in the revival of The Elephant Man. As of May 2019, she is one of only six actors, including Amanda Plummer, Dana Ivey, Jan Maxwell, Mark Rylance, and Jeremy Pope, to be nominated for Tony awards in two different categories in the same year. In 2006, Burton starred in the Off-Broadway production of The Water's Edge opposite Tony Goldwyn. That year, she again received a Tony nomination for Best Leading Actress in a Play for her role in W. Somerset Maugham's The Constant Wife. In 2007, she played Ranevskaya in The Cherry Orchard at Boston's Huntington Theatre. On December 21, 2007, she joined the cast of the Broadway musical Spring Awakening in the role of the Adult Women when she replaced actress Christine Estabrook. Kristine Nielsen replaced her on March 2, 2008, for a short stint until Estabrook reassumed the role. During the summer of 2010, Burton portrayed actress Katharine Cornell in A.R. Gurney's The Grand Manner at Lincoln Center in New York. In April 2017, she began playing Liz Essendine in the Broadway revival of Present Laughter, the play in which she made her debut.

=== Film and television ===
Burton's first screen appearance was in the 1969 film Anne of the Thousand Days, starring her father, with whom she later appeared as Alice opposite his White Knight in the 1983 Great Performances broadcast of Alice in Wonderland, and in the 1984 CBS miniseries Ellis Island. Other films include Big Trouble in Little China, The First Wives Club, Life with Mikey, and The Ice Storm. Burton has said of these roles that she usually plays "the sweet wife, or the sweet dead wife."

Burton has been perhaps most prolific in her work on television. She made many television appearances in the late 1980s and 1990s on such episodic shows as Spenser: For Hire, All My Children, and Brooklyn Bridge. About playing the mother, in her late thirties, of David Schwimmer's character in the short-lived 1994 FOX sitcom, Monty, she said, "you don't really start playing moms in Hollywood until you're in your 40s, and usually the kids are almost your age! When I played Schwimmer's mother, I was 37 and he was, I think, 28. . . that happens a lot in TV and film; you really do end up being close in age to your child, which is nonsensical." In 1996, Burton won a Daytime Emmy award for her performance as a mother dying of breast cancer in the ABC Afterschool Special, 'Notes for my Daughter'. More recently, she made guest appearances as recurring characters on Law & Order, The Practice, The West Wing, Judging Amy and Medium. She also appeared on the HBO miniseries Empire Falls.

Some of her recurring television roles have involved subplots concerning Alzheimer's disease. On FX network's Rescue Me, she played the role of Rose, a friend and possible romantic interest to Chief Jerry Reilly. Reilly, whose wife is in a facility suffering from Alzheimer's, hires Rose, a caregiver for her husband who was also a victim, to provide assistance and emotional support. Burton's most visible and well-known role to date is the mysterious and difficult mother of Dr. Meredith Grey (Ellen Pompeo), the titular character on ABC's medical drama Grey's Anatomy. Burton plays Dr. Ellis Grey, the former trailblazing surgeon, and a two-time winner of the fictionalized, prestigious Harper Avery Award. Her character's battle and death of Alzheimer's is central to Meredith's story in all seasons of the series, as Meredith fears both getting the disease and resembling her mother as she ages. The character is also revealed to be the birth mother of Meredith's half-sister, Dr. Maggie Pierce (Kelly McCreary) through her love affair with Dr. Richard Webber (James Pickens, Jr.).

Like Schwimmer's character in Monty, Burton and Pompeo (who portrays Meredith) also have a small age gap, with Pompeo being 12 years her junior. In-universe, Meredith (born 1978) is 25 years younger than Ellis (born 1953), with Pompeo aged down 11 years and Burton aged up 4 years. (Though the character's exact ages were not determined until a retcon was established in season 11). In 2008, the New York City Chapter of the Alzheimer's Association singled her out for her compelling performances in both shows. In 2006 and 2007, Burton received Emmy nominations for her Grey's Anatomy role. Burton's character dies in the third season episode "Some Kind of Miracle", which aired in 2007; she returned to the role five years later, in the season 8 alternate reality episode. It depicts a version of her life where Richard did not leave her and she did not have Alzheimer's. Burton's character is central to the eleventh season, as Meredith's marital struggles begin to parallel her own mother's struggles, something she feared. She reprised her role in flashbacks for the eleventh season, showing Ellis briefly before her Alzheimer's diagnosis. In season 14's landmark 300th episode, Burton's Ellis is shown as a dream-sequence figure, clapping for Meredith, who has also now won a Harper Avery award. She re-appears twice as a dream sequence figure in the fifteenth season. Burton will return to the role in the eighteenth season, beginning with its season premiere.

In 2011, Burton appeared as Marie Kessler, a veteran monster hunter, and the aunt of Nick Burkhardt in the opening episodes of the NBC supernatural drama Grimm. Since 2012, she plays the recurring role of Vice President Sally Langston in the ABC hit show Scandal, for which she again received an Emmy nomination. In 2015, it was reported that Burton was cast in a leading role in the U.S. remake of the French-language film Martyrs, which opened theatrically in January 2016. In March 2017, she reprised her role as Aunt Marie Kessler in the series finale of Grimm.

=== Other work ===
Burton has narrated numerous audiobooks, including works by: Patricia Cornwell, Lisa Scottoline, Iris Johansen, and Dean Koontz.

== Personal life ==
In 1985, Burton married Michael Ritchie, Artistic Director of the Center Theatre Group in Los Angeles and one of the producers of the Broadway musicals The Drowsy Chaperone and Curtains. They met in 1982, while Ritchie was stage manager of a revival of Noël Coward's Present Laughter at the Circle in the Square Theatre in New York City in which Burton was playing the character Daphne. They have two children, son Morgan Ivor and daughter Charlotte Frances. Burton became a U.S. citizen in 2005, and also holds a U.K. passport.

== Filmography ==
=== Film ===
Year	Title	Role	Notes
1969	Anne of the Thousand Days	Serving Maid	Uncredited
1986	Big Trouble in Little China	Margo Litzenberger	
1993	Life with Mikey	Mrs. Burns	
1996	August	Helen Blathwaite	
1996	The First Wives Club	Woman in Bed	
1997	The Ice Storm	Dorothy Franklin	
1998	Celebrity	Cheryl	
2000	The Opportunists	Rest Home Sister	
2002	Unfaithful	Tracy	
2002	Swimfan	Carla Cronin	
2003	The Paper Mache Chase	Martha	Short film
2005	Stay	Mrs. Letham	
2006	Sherrybaby	Marcia Swanson	
2007	Lovely by Surprise	Helen	
2008	What Just Happened	Dr. Randall	
2008	Quid Pro Quo	Merilee	
2008	Max Payne	Nicole Horne	
2009	The Kings of Appletown	Aunt Birdy	
2009	Spooner	Alice Spooner	
2010	Remember Me	Janine	
2010	Consent	Susan	
2010	127 Hours	Aron's Mom	
2011	Puncture	Senator O'Reilly	
2012	Liberal Arts	Susan	
2012	2 Days in New York	Bella	
2012	Mariachi Gringo	Anne	
2014	Barefoot	Mrs. Wheeler	
2015	Bleeding Heart	Martha	
2015	Martyrs	Eleanor	
2015	Amok	Dr. Wilson	
2019	Where'd You Go, Bernadette	Ellen Idelson	
2022	Breaking	Tami Stackhouse	
2023	Our Son	Maggie	
2023	The Anne Frank Gift Shop	Ilse	Short film
2023	Dumb Money	Elaine Gill	
2024	Guts	Gabby	Short film
2025	The Surrender	Barbara	
2025	Violent Ends	Darlene Woodley	
TBA	A Great Depression		Post-production

=== Television ===
Year	Title	Role	Notes
1983, 2017	Great Performances	Alice / Liz Essendine	2 episodes
1984	Ellis Island	Vanessa Ogden	Miniseries; 3 episodes
1985	Evergreen	Agatha Bradford	Episode: "1.2"
1987	Uncle Tom's Cabin	Ophelia	Television film
1987–1988	Spenser: For Hire	Randy Lofficier	2 episodes
1988	American Playhouse	Agnes Bolton O'Neill	Episode: "Journey Into Genius"
1992	Law & Order	Sister Bettina	Episode: "Sisters of Mercy"
1992	Home Fires	Anne Kramer	6 episodes
1993	Brooklyn Bridge	Susan Lowenberg Jones	Episode: "Keeping Up with the Joneses"
1993	Love Matters	Deborah	Television film
1994	Monty	Fran Richardson	13 episodes
1994	All My Children	Dr. Renee Peters	Unknown episodes
1995	ABC Afterschool Special	Brenda Gardner	Episode: "Notes for My Daughter"; Daytime Emmy Award for Outstanding Performer in a Children's Special
1996	Mistrial	Katherine Donohue	Television film
1997	Ellen Foster	Abigail Montford	Television film
1997–2004	The Practice	A.D.A. Susan Alexander	9 episodes
2001	100 Centre Street	Sheila Byrne	Episode: "My Brother's Keeper"
2001	Law & Order: Criminal Intent	Stephanie Uffland	Episode: "The Pardoner's Tale"
2001–2009	Law & Order	Erica Gardner	4 episodes
2002	Obsessed	Sara Miller	Television film
2003	The Diary of Ellen Rimbauer	Connie Posey	Television film
2004	The West Wing	Sarah Brainerd	Episode: "Slow News Day"
2005	Judging Amy	Dr. Sheri Jordan	Episode: "Silent Era"
2005	Empire Falls	Cindy Whiting	2 episodes
2005	American Masters	Voice of Novels	Episode: "Ernest Hemingway: Rivers to the Sea"
2005	Numb3rs	Anthropologist	Episode: "Bones of Contention"
2005–2006	Rescue Me	Rose	6 episodes
2005–present	Grey's Anatomy	Ellis Grey	28 episodes Nominated—Primetime Emmy Award for Outstanding Guest Actress in a Drama Series (2006–07)
2006	Justice	Sarah Miller	Episode: "Death Spiral"
2007	Supreme Courtships	Justice Suzanne Mary Lynch	Unsold TV pilot
2008	Medium	Bonnie Barrister	Episode: "To Have and to Hold"
2009	Eleventh Hour	Gepetto / Miranda Cochran	Episode: "Pinocchio"
2009	Washingtonienne	Joy	Episode: "Pilot"
2009–2012	The Good Wife	Victoria Adler	3 episodes
2010	The Deep End	Grace Graham	Episode: "Pilot"
2011	Law & Order: Special Victims Unit	Annette Cole	Episode: "Bully"
2011	Criminal Minds: Suspect Behavior	Deirdre Norris	Episode: "Smother"
2011	The Closer	Kate Wycoff	Episode: "Forgive Us Our Trespasses"
2011–2017	Grimm	Marie Kessler	3 episodes
2012	Made in Jersey	Lorraine Beckett	Episode: "Cacti"
2012–2017	Veep	Barbara Hallowes	3 episodes
2012–2018	Scandal	Vice President Sally Langston	42 episodes Nominated—Primetime Emmy Award for Outstanding Guest Actress in a Drama Series (2014)
2013	Revolution	Dr. Jane Warren	Episode: "The Night the Lights Went Out in Georgia"
2013	Live from Lincoln Center	Mrs. Mullin	Episode: "The New York Philharmonic's Performance of Rodgers & Hammerstein's Carousel"
2014	Rake	Holly Phillips	Episode: "Hey, Good Looking"
2015	Full Circle	Vera Quinn	5 episodes
2015	Key & Peele	Hillary Clinton	Episode: "Y'all Ready for This?"
2015	Extant	Fiona Stanton	6 episodes
2016	Elementary	Maureen Dannon	Episode: "Down Where the Dead Delight"
2016–2018	Madam Secretary	Maureen McCord-Ryan	2 episodes
2018	This Is Us	Barbara	2 episodes
2018	Modern Family	Iris Fennerman	Episode: "The Escape"
2018	Mr. Mercedes	Mrs. MacDonald	3 episodes
2018	The Gifted	Dr. Madeline Risman-Garver	Episode: "the dreaM"
2019, 2021	Supergirl	Isabel Nal	3 episodes
2019	NCIS: New Orleans	Angela Prescott	Episode: "A House Divided"
2019	Strange Angel		4 episodes
2019	Perfect Harmony	Julie	Episode: "Merry Jaxmas"
2020	Homeland	Doris Warner	Episode: "F**ker Shot Me"
2020	13 Reasons Why	Doctor	Episodes: "Graduation
2020–2021	Charmed	Elder Celeste	6 episodes
2020–2021	American Experience	Narrator	4 episodes
2021	Prodigal Son	Sarah Windsor	Episode: "Bad Manners"
2021	The Mosquito Coast	Margot's Mom	Episode: "Light Out"
2022	Inventing Anna	Nora Radford	3 episodes
2022	The Dropout	Rochelle Gibbons	4 episodes
2022	Bosch: Legacy	Ida Porter	5 episodes
2022	The First Lady	Hillary Clinton	Episode: "Rift"
2022	So Help Me Todd	Joan	Episode: "Let the Wright One In"
2022	Echo 3	The Senator	2 episodes
2024	FBI	Deputy Secretary of State Evelyn Kates	Episode: "No One Left Behind"
2025	Ransom Canyon	Katherine Bullock	3 episodes
2025	The Beast in Me	Mariah Ingram	2 episodes
2026	Law & Order: Special Victims Unit	Dr. Bethany Allen	season 27 episode 12 "Hubris"

=== Stage ===
Year	Title	Role	Notes
1982	Present Laughter	Daphne Stillington	Circle in the Square Theatre, Broadway
1982	Alice in Wonderland	Alice	Virginia Theatre, Broadway
1983	Doonesbury	J.J.	Blitmore Theatre, Broadway
1986	Wild Honey	Sasha	Virginia Theatre, Broadway
1989	Measure for Measure	Isabella	Lincoln Center, Off-Broadway
1990	Some Americans Abroad	Betty McNeil	Vivian Beaumont Theater, Broadway
1992	Jake's Women	Julie	Neil Simon Theatre, Broadway
1995	Company	Sarah	Criterion Center Stage Right, Broadway
1995	London Suite	Lauren/Grace/Annie	Roundabout Theatre Company, Off-Broadway
1997	An American Daughter	Lyssa Dent Hughes (Replacement)	Cort Theatre, Broadway
1998	The Beauty Queen of Leenane	Maureen Folan (Replacement)	Walter Kerr Theatre, Broadway
1999	Lake Hollywood	Agnes	Signature Theatre Company, Off-Broadway
1999	Give Me Your Answer, Do!	Daisy Connolly	Gramercy Theatre, Off-Broadway
2001	Hedda Gabler	Hedda Tesman	Ambassador Theatre, Broadway
2002	Boston Marriage	Anna	Public Theatre, Off-Broadway
2002	The Elephant Man	Mrs. Kendal/Pinhead	Royale Theatre, Broadway
2005	The Constant Wife	Constance Middleton	American Airlines Theatre, Broadway
2006	The Water's Edge	Helen	Second Stage Theater, Off-Broadway
2007	The Cherry Orchard	Madame Ranevskaya	Huntington Theatre Company, Boston
2008	Spring Awakening	Adult Women (Replacement)	Eugene O'Neill Theatre, Broadway
2010	The Grand Manner	Katharine Cornell	Lincoln Center, Off-Broadway
2015	Cymbeline	Queen	Delacorte Theater, Off-Broadway
2015	The Price	Esther	Mark Taper Forum, Los Angeles
2016	The Dead, 1904	Gretta	Irish Repertory Theatre, Off-Broadway
2017	Present Laughter	Liz Essendine	St. James Theatre, Broadway
2019	Coriolanus	Volumnia	Delacorte Theater, Off-Broadway
2021	A Christmas Carol	Ghost of Christmas Past	National Tour
2025	Irishtown	Constance	Irish Repertory Theatre, Off-Broadway
2025	Kyoto	USA	Lincoln Center, Off-Broadway

== Awards and nominations ==
Year	Award	Category	Work	Result	Ref.
1983	Theater World Awards		Alice in Wonderland, Present Laughter and Winners	Won	
1990	Drama Desk Awards	Outstanding Featured Actress in a Play	Some Americans Abroad	Nominated	
1996	Daytime Emmy Awards	Outstanding Performer in a Children's Special	Notes for My Daughter, ABC Afterschool Special	Won	
2002	Tony Awards	Best Featured Actress in a Play	The Elephant Man	Nominated	
2002	Tony Awards	Best Actress in a Play	Hedda Gabler	Nominated	
2006	Tony Awards	Best Actress in a Play	The Constant Wife	Nominated	
2006	Primetime Emmy Awards	Outstanding Guest Actress in a Drama Series	Grey's Anatomy	Nominated	
2007	Primetime Emmy Awards	Outstanding Guest Actress in a Drama Series	Grey's Anatomy	Nominated	
2014	Primetime Emmy Awards	Outstanding Guest Actress in a Drama Series	Scandal	Nominated	

== See also ==
- List of Tony Award records
