= The Tree (1969 film) =

The Tree is a 1969 American film that was written, produced, and directed, by Robert Guenette. A psychological drama revolving around the kidnapping of a young child, the film stars Jordan Christopher, Eileen Heckart, Alan Landers, Gale Dixon, James Broderick, Kathy Ryan, Ruth Ford, and George Rose.

== See also ==
- List of American films of 1969
