= Portrait of the Blues =

Studio album by Lou Rawls
- Released: 1993
- Genre: Blues, R&B
- Label: Manhattan
- Producer: Michael Cuscuna, Billy Vera

Lou Rawls chronology
It's Supposed to be Fun (1990)	Portrait of the Blues (1993)	Christmas Is the Time (1993)

Portrait of the Blues is an album by the American singer Lou Rawls, released in 1993.

The album peaked at No. 4 on the Billboard Traditional Jazz Albums chart.

== Production ==
The album was produced by Michael Cuscuna and Billy Vera. Junior Wells, Buddy Guy, and Lionel Hampton were among the many musicians who contributed to the album. Rawls sings two Willie Dixon numbers: "I Just Want to Make Love to You" and "My Babe".

== Critical reception ==
Professional ratings
Review scores
Source	Rating
AllMusic	3/5 stars
The Encyclopedia of Popular Music	3/5 stars
MusicHound R&B: The Essential Album Guide	4/5 stars
The Philadelphia Inquirer	3.5/4 stars

Stereo Review deemed the album "a treat," writing that it "benefits from the mellow horn arrangements of Hank Crawford and Benny Golson." The New Pittsburgh Courier thought that "the disc's lightest moment is provided by a charming duet with Phoebe Snow on 'A Lover's Question'." The Houston Chronicle wrote that Rawls "has seldom sounded better, and his urbane phrasing is cut with just the right amount of downhome grit."

The Philadelphia Inquirer declared that "it sounds amazingly retro, a kind of rhythm-and-blues time capsule that's closer to his classic early recordings than anything else in a long time." The Times opined that Rawls's voice "has lost none of its velvet sheen." The Colorado Springs Gazette-Telegraph called Portrait of the Blues "a contemporary blues masterpiece."

AllMusic wrote that Rawls's "delivery and articulation give the songs an uptown flair."

== Track listing ==
No.	Title	Length
1.	"I Just Want to Make Love to You"
2.	"A Lover's Question"
3.	"Person to Person"
4.	"Since I Met You Baby"
5.	"I'm Still in Love with You"
6.	"Snap Your Fingers"
7.	"Baby What You Want Me to Do"
8.	"Suffering with the Blues"
9.	"Hide Nor Hair"
10.	"Chains of Love"
11.	"My Babe"
12.	"I Ain't Got Nothin' but the Blues"
13.	"Save Your Love for Me"
14.	"Saturday Night Fish Fry"
15.	"Sweet Slumber"
