= The Wild Ones (American band) =

American rock band

- Origin: New York City, U.S.
- Genres: Rock and roll, pop
- Years active: 1964–1967
- Label: United Artists
- Past members: Jordan Christopher; Chuck Alden; Jimmy Zack; Eddie Wright; Tommy Trick; Tom Graves

The Wild Ones were an American rock band from New York City, initially led by singer Jordan Christopher. They are perhaps best known for recording the first version of Chip Taylor's song "Wild Thing", which later was a smash hit for the Troggs.

== History ==
The band formed in Manhattan in 1964. The original members were:

- Jordan Christopher (lead vocal)
- Chuck Alden (guitar / backup vocal)
- Jimmy Zack (electric piano / backup vocal) - soon replaced by Tom Graves (organ / backup vocal)
- Eddie Wright (bass / backup vocal)
- Tommy Trick (born Thomas Tricarico - drums)

They began playing at the Peppermint Lounge, soon becoming the house band there, but left in April 1965 to become the house band at Sybil Burton's nightclub, Arthur. Within a week of meeting, Sybil Burton and Jordan Christopher married. The band recorded an album, The Arthur Sound, which hit #149 on the US Billboard 200. The album was produced by Daniel Secunda (the brother of Tony Secunda), with a sleeve photograph by Richard Avedon. Alden and Trick were dissatisfied with the production of the record, and Jordan Christopher left the group soon afterwards to pursue an acting career, with Alden then taking over as lead singer. With Christopher, the band appeared in the "Z movie", The Fat Spy (1966), starring Phyllis Diller and Jayne Mansfield and also featuring Johnny Tillotson; the film featured in the documentary The 50 Worst Movies Ever Made (2004).

The group continued to perform nightly at Arthur after their album was released. With Alden on lead vocals, and production by Gerry Granahan, they released their first single, "Wild Thing", on November 1, 1965, but it failed to reach the charts. In summer 1966, the band were sponsored by Sears, Roebuck, as a marketing ploy, to tour nationally. However, after Arthur closed in early 1967, the band soon split up.
