= The Sidelong Glances of a Pigeon Kicker =

1970 film by John Dexter

- Theatrical release poster
- Directed by: John Dexter
- Screenplay by: Ron Whyte
- Based on: The Sidelong Glances of a Pigeon Kicker by David Boyer
- Produced by: Richard Lewis
- Starring: Jordan Christopher; Jill O'Hara; Robert Walden; Kate Reid; William Redfield; Lois Nettleton
- Cinematography: Urs Furrer
- Edited by: John Oettinger
- Music by: Christopher Dedrick; Lee Holdridge; Edd Kalehoff; Warren Marley; Patrick Williams
- Production company: Saturn Productions
- Distributed by: Metro-Goldwyn-Mayer
- Release date: October 28, 1970 (United States)
- Running time: 106 minutes
- Country: United States
- Language: English

The Sidelong Glances of a Pigeon Kicker (stylized as Pigeons) is a 1970 American comedy film directed by John Dexter and written by Ron Whyte. The film stars Jordan Christopher, Jill O'Hara, Robert Walden, Kate Reid, William Redfield and Lois Nettleton. The film was released on October 28, 1970, by Metro-Goldwyn-Mayer.

== Plot ==
Three years after graduating from Princeton, disillusioned Jonathan is driving a Manhattan taxicab and expressing his disgust with the world by insulting his obnoxious passengers and kicking pigeons in Riverside Park. His circle of acquaintances includes Winslow Smith, a motorcycle-riding, leather-jacketed, self-styled rebel, whose image is undermined by the fact that at 24 he is still a virgin; Oliver, a homosexual interior decorator who stages elaborate parties and tries, unsuccessfully, to seduce his male guests; and Jennifer, a 21-year-old tenant in Jonathan's building, whose sojourn in New York City to "find herself" is being subsidized by her parents. While attending one of Oliver's wild soirees, Jonathan is accosted by a nymphomaniacal former bedmate, Naomi, who drags him into the bathroom, strips off her clothes, and invites him to join her in the fur-lined tub. Instead, he returns to his apartment, visits Jennifer, and explains why he must maintain emotional detachment. Jennifer, however, is such an understanding listener that she and Jonathan are soon making love. At Christmas, Jonathan takes Jennifer to spend the holidays in Darien, Connecticut, with his suburbanite parents—a possessive and petulant mother and a potentially alcoholic stepfather. But his mother angrily discovers Jonathan and Jennifer nude in the bed, and after a seasonal party leads to further generation gap warfare Jonathan and Jennifer abruptly return to the city. Although drawn to Jennifer, Jonathan is soured by the prospects of married life and is even becoming increasingly apathetic toward his friends. One night, attempting to explain his disenchantment to Jennifer, he enters her apartment and finds her in bed with Winslow. Shattered, Jonathan dazedly drives his cab through the city until finally, in a rage, he plunges off the docks into the river. Recovering in the intensive care unit of a hospital, Jonathan is visited by his friends as well as by Jennifer, who pleads for a second chance to demonstrate her love. Instead Jonathan slips out of the hospital, packs his bags, and boards a train for Des Moines, Iowa. There he plans to drive a truck and continue his isolated existence of thumbing his nose at the world.

== Cast ==
- Jordan Christopher as Jonathan
- Jill O'Hara as Jennifer
- Robert Walden as Winslow Smith
- Kate Reid as Jonathan's Mother
- William Redfield as Jonathan's Father
- Lois Nettleton as Mildred
- Boni Enten as Naomi
- Elaine Stritch as Tough Lady
- Melba Moore as Model at Party
- Riggs O'Hara as Oliver
- Kristoffer Tabori as Oliver's Boyfriend
- Donald Warfield as Young Stutterer
- Jean Shevlin as Mrs. Abelman
- Matt Warner as Mr. Abelman
- Sylvester Stallone as Party Guest (uncredited) (Note: The then-unknown Sylvester Stallone was an extra in this movie during the party scenes. He may be seen in several shots wearing the same colorful sweater he wore in an adult film he also made in 1970, The Party at Kitty and Stud's, also known as Italian Stallion.)

== Release ==
=== Home media ===
The DVD issued by Scorpion Releasing is missing around 15 minutes of footage.
