= A Man of Value =

Studio album by Lou Rawls
- Released: 1972
- Genre: Soul
- Label: MGM
- Producer: Michael Lloyd

Lou Rawls chronology
| Silk & Soul (1972) | A Man of Value (1972) | The Soul of Nigger Charley (1973) |

A Man of Value is an album by the American musician Lou Rawls, released in 1972. He supported it with a North American tour. "Walk On In" was the first single.

== Production ==
The album was produced by Michael Lloyd, with the musical arrangement by Reg Powell. "The Politician" criticizes the presidency of Richard Nixon and American's involvement in the Vietnam War. "Learning Cup" admonishes young people to take advantage of formal education. "Walk On In" was written by Carole King. "Fire and Rain" is a cover of the James Taylor song; "A Song for You" was written by Leon Russell. "Evil" is a version of the Stevie Wonder song.

== Critical reception ==
Professional ratings
Review scores
| Source | Rating |
|---|---|
| All Music Guide to Soul | 3/5 stars |

The Times-Union said that the "gospel-flavored soul impresses again". The Pittsburgh Press stated, "Lou has an intriguing way of talking his way into a song with his well-modulated voice." The Detroit Free Press praised Rawls's "rap-singing" and "great groove". The Journal and Courier concluded that "Lou has a fine delivery, even bordering on rock." The News and Observer called Rawls "a rather slick singer", noting that "his songs of social comment turn out to be embarrassing." The Birmingham News admired that he "has a real feeling for improvisation".

== Track listing ==
Side 1

1. "A Man of Value"
2. "The Politician"
3. "Where the Wind Blows Free"
4. "A Song for You"
5. "Goodbye's a Long, Long Time"

Side 2

1. "Walk On In"
2. "Learning Cup"
3. "Too Much Living to Do"
4. "Fire and Rain"
5. "Evil"
