= Michael Ritchie (artistic director) =

American artistic director (born 1957)

- Born: October 1957 (age 68); Worcester, Massachusetts, U.S.
- Other names: Michael F. Ritchie
- Occupations: Stage manager, artistic director
- Spouse: Kate Burton (m. 1985)
- Children: 2
- Relatives: Richard Burton (father-in-law); Sybil Christopher (mother-in-law)
- Website: www.centertheatregroup.org

Michael Ritchie is a former American stage manager & artistic director of Williamstown Theater Festival from 1996 to 2005 and Center Theatre Group from 2005 to 2021.

== Early and personal life ==
Ritchie was born in Worcester, Massachusetts, to Irish-Scots parents. He holds Irish citizenship.

In 1982, while stage managing a revival of Noël Coward's Present Laughter, Ritchie met actress Kate Burton, the daughter of actors Richard Burton and Sybil Christopher. They married in 1985 and have two children.

== Career ==
While Ritchie was in high school, he began stage managing at the Surflight Theatre. His first Broadway stage management credit is the 1981 revival of George Bernard Shaw's Candida at Circle in the Square, starring Joanne Woodward. His subsequent twenty-five Broadway production stage management credits include the 1988 revival of Our Town, starring Spalding Gray. In 1996, Ritchie became the third artistic director of Williamstown Theater Festival in Williamstown, Massachusetts. Over fifty productions were staged during Ritchie's tenure, including six productions that were later transferred to Broadway. In 2002, Williamstown Theater Festival won the Regional Theatre Tony Award. In 2005, Ritchie left Williamstown and became the artistic director of Center Theatre Group. CTG operates the Ahmanson Theatre, the Mark Taper Forum, and the Kirk Douglas Theater in Los Angeles. At CTG, Ritchie produced the first American productions of The Drowsy Chaperone, 13, and Curtains. In 2021, Ritchie retired during the COVID-19 pandemic.
