= George Rose (actor) =

English actor and singer (1920–1988)

- Born: George Walter Rose; 19 February 1920; Bicester, Oxfordshire, England
- Died: 5 May 1988 (aged 68); Sosúa, Puerto Plata, Dominican Republic
- Education: Royal Central School of Speech and Drama
- Occupations: Actor, singer
- Years active: 1935–1988
- Children: 1 (adopted)

George Walter Rose (19 February 1920 – 5 May 1988) was an English actor and singer in theatre and film. He won the Tony Award for Best Actor in a Musical for roles in My Fair Lady and The Mystery of Edwin Drood.

== Early life ==
Born in Bicester, Oxfordshire, the son of a butcher, Rose studied at the Central School of Speech and Drama. After graduation, he was briefly a farmer and secretary. After wartime service and studies at Oxford, he made his Old Vic stage debut in 1946.

== Career ==
Rose spent four years with the Old Vic company and made his Broadway debut in a 1946 production of Henry IV, Part I and continued to play in New York City and London's West End for the remainder of the decade. He spent most of the 1950s appearing in broad comedy roles in the UK, later joining the Royal Shakespeare Company. He returned to Broadway to portray Dogberry in Much Ado About Nothing in 1959. Two years later, he co-starred to much acclaim in Robert Bolt's A Man for All Seasons, first in London and then in New York. This included Variety naming him the best supporting actor for his portrayal of the Common Man. From then on, he appeared primarily in American plays and films.

Rose made his screen debut in Midnight Frolics in 1949 and made more than 30 films. Notable film credits include The Pickwick Papers (1952), Track the Man Down (1955), A Night to Remember (1958), The Flesh and the Fiends (1959), Hawaii (1966), and A New Leaf (1971). Rose starred in the 1975 television series Beacon Hill, an Americanised version of Upstairs, Downstairs. Other television credits include Naked City, The Trials of O'Brien, the mini-series Holocaust (1978), and several appearances on the Hallmark Hall of Fame.

On Broadway, among other roles, he played the First Gravedigger in John Gielgud's 1964 production of Hamlet starring Richard Burton, a suspicious storekeeper in William Hanley's Slow Dance on the Killing Ground (1964), a bitter soldier in Peter Shaffer's Royal Hunt of the Sun (1965), and the detective in Joe Orton's Loot (1968). His first Tony Award nomination was for his portrayal of Louis Greff, Coco Chanel's friend, in the musical Coco in 1969. In the 1974 comedy My Fat Friend, opposite Lynn Redgrave, he won a Drama Desk Award and received another Tony nomination. In 1976, he finally won a Tony as Alfred P. Doolittle in the 20th anniversary Broadway revival of My Fair Lady. He received further acclaim in the role of General Burgoyne in The Devil's Disciple, as Mr. Darling and Captain Hook in Peter Pan and as one of Rex Harrison's co-stars in The Kingfisher; he won a 1979 Drama Desk Award for the last.

In 1980, he appeared as Major General Stanley in the hit Joe Papp adaptation of The Pirates of Penzance, co-starring Kevin Kline and Linda Ronstadt, being nominated for another Tony award. He also starred in the film adaptation of the production, released in 1983. Rose won his second Tony in 1986 for Rupert Holmes' musical adaptation of The Mystery of Edwin Drood. Rose was appearing in a national tour of Drood at the time of his death in 1988. His last film role was Pound Puppies and the Legend of Big Paw, in which he voiced the villain Marvin McNasty (and also sang one of the film's songs).

== Personal life and death ==
Rose owned a pet lynx, birds, and other exotic creatures. He had a music collection numbering around 17,000 records.

In 1984, he purchased a holiday home in Sosúa, Dominican Republic, where he spent much of his time between performances. Rose was homosexual and had no immediate family or permanent partner. He reportedly longed to have an heir. Shortly after moving, he took in a teenage boy whom he supported financially and to whom he planned to leave his estate. He officially adopted the boy in January 1988.

On 5 May 1988, during a two-week hiatus from the national tour of Drood, Rose was tortured and beaten to death by his adopted son (then 18), the boy's biological father, an uncle, and a friend of the father. The assailants tried to make the death look like a car accident but soon confessed. Though all four were charged and spent time in prison, no trial was ever held, and eventually all were released.

Rose is buried in an unmarked grave in a cemetery near his Sosúa home.

== Awards and nominations ==
Year	Award	Category	Work	Result
1970	Tony Award	Best Performance by a Featured Actor in a Musical	Coco	Nominated
1974	Drama Desk Award	Outstanding Performance	My Fat Friend	Won
1974	Outer Critics Circle Award	Outstanding Actor	My Fat Friend	Won
1975	Tony Award	Best Performance by a Featured Actor in a Play	My Fat Friend	Nominated
1976	Tony Award	Best Performance by a Leading Actor in a Musical	My Fair Lady	Won
1976	Drama Desk Award	Outstanding Featured Actor in a Musical	My Fair Lady	Won
1977	Drama Desk Award	Outstanding Featured Actor in a Musical	She Loves Me	Nominated
1979	Drama Desk Award	Outstanding Featured Actor in a Play	The Kingfisher	Won
1981	Tony Award	Best Performance by a Leading Actor in a Musical	The Pirates of Penzance	Nominated
1981	Drama Desk Award	Outstanding Actor in a Musical	The Pirates of Penzance	Nominated
1986	Tony Award	Best Performance by a Leading Actor in a Musical	The Mystery of Edwin Drood	Won
1986	Drama Desk Award	Outstanding Actor in a Musical	The Mystery of Edwin Drood	Won

== Stage productions ==
- A Penny for a Song (1951)
- A Man For All Seasons (1962)
- Richard Burton's Hamlet (1964)
- Slow Dance on the Killing Ground (1964)
- The Royal Hunt of the Sun (1965)
- Walking Happy (1966)
- Loot (1968)
- Canterbury Tales (1969)
- Coco (1969)
- Sleuth (1970)
- Wise Child (1972)
- My Fat Friend (1974)
- My Fair Lady (1976)
- The Kingfisher (1978)
- Peter Pan (1979)
- The Pirates of Penzance (1981)
- You Can't Take It with You (1983)
- Dance a Little Closer (1983)
- Aren't We All? (1985)
- The Mystery of Edwin Drood (1985)

== Filmography ==
Year	Title	Role	Notes
1952	The Pickwick Papers		Uncredited; film debut
1953	Grand National Night	Plainclothes Detective	
1953	The Beggar's Opera	First Turnkey	
1953	The Square Ring	Whitey Johnson	
1954	The Good Die Young	Bunny	
1954	Devil on Horseback	Blacksmith	
1954	The Sea Shall Not Have Them	Tebbitt	
1955	The Night My Number Came Up	Bennett	
1955	Track the Man Down	Rick Lambert	
1955	John and Julie	Wilbury Policeman	
1956	Port of Escape	Publican	
1956	The Long Arm	Slob	
1956	Reach for the Sky	Squadron Leader Edwards	Uncredited
1956	Sailor Beware!	Waiter at Banfield's	
1957	Brothers in Law	Mark Frost	
1957	The Good Companions	Theatre Manager	
1957	The Shiralee	Donny	
1957	No Time for Tears	Dobbie	
1957	Barnacle Bill	Bullen	
1958	A Night to Remember	Charles Joughin	
1958	A Tale of Two Cities	Roger Cly	Uncredited
1958	Law and Disorder	Warden in Charge of Cell Under the Court	Uncredited
1958	Cat & Mouse	Second-Hand Clothes Dealer	
1959	The Heart of a Man	Charlie	
1959	Jack the Ripper	Clarke	
1959	The Devil's Disciple	British Sergeant	
1959	Jet Storm	James Brock	
1959	Desert Mice	Popados	
1960	The Flesh and the Fiends	William Burke	
1961	No Love for Johnnie	Edward Collins	
1964	Richard Burton's Hamlet	First Gravedigger	
1966	Hawaii	Capt. Janders	
1968	The Pink Jungle	Capt. Stopes	
1969	The Tree	Stuey Morgan	
1971	A New Leaf	Harold	
1973	From the Mixed-Up Files of Mrs. Basil E. Frankweiler	Saxonburg	
1978	Holocaust	Franz Lowy	Miniseries
1983	The Pirates of Penzance	Major-General Stanley	
1988	Pound Puppies and the Legend of Big Paw	Marvin McNasty / Sir McNasty	Voice; final role
