= Coco (musical) =

1969 Broadway musical inspired by the life of Coco Chanel

- Music: André Previn
- Lyrics: Alan Jay Lerner
- Book: Alan Jay Lerner
- Basis: The life of Coco Chanel
- Productions: 1969 Broadway; 1971 First National Tour; 1971 Summer Stock

Coco is a 1969 Broadway musical with a book and lyrics by Alan Jay Lerner and music by André Previn, inspired by the life of Coco Chanel. Katharine Hepburn starred in the title role, her first and only in a stage musical.

== Background ==
Theatre producer Frederick Brisson originally had optioned Chanel's life for his wife Rosalind Russell, but Russell had developed acute arthritis, making it difficult for her to function. That meant another leading lady with star quality needed to be found. Irene Selznick suggested Katharine Hepburn, who initially scoffed at the idea of appearing in a musical but agreed to work with former MGM vocal coach Roger Edens for ten days. Following an audition in Selznick's suite at The Pierre Hotel, Hepburn felt comfortable enough to mull seriously the proposition, and was further convinced to accept the offer after meeting Chanel.

Lerner had assured the designer his book would cover only the early years of her life and career, and she was distressed when the plan was jettisoned to accommodate the older star. The highly fictionalized book and score underwent massive revisions and were far from complete when Hepburn concluded filming on The Madwoman of Chaillot, at which time she was scheduled to begin work on the show, and Coco was postponed a season while its creators worked on it.

The six-week rehearsal period finally began in September 1969. Cecil Beaton's set proved to be a complicated piece of machinery that frequently malfunctioned and was difficult for the cast to maneuver, and the final scene required a troublesome coordination of mirrors, platforms, runways, and flashing lights. Hepburn insisted the theater's thermostat be set at 60 degrees and the exterior doors left open, and most of the cast became ill due to the unusually cold fall weather.

== Synopsis ==
Set between early autumn of 1953 and late spring of 1954, fashion designer Coco Chanel, after fifteen years of retirement, decides to return to the world of haute couture and reopen her Paris salon. With her new collection derided by the critics, she faces bankruptcy until buyers from four major American department stores - Saks Fifth Avenue, Bloomingdale's, Best & Company, and Ohrbach's - place orders with her. She becomes involved with the love life of one of her models, and flashbacks utilizing filmed sequences recall her own past romantic flings. Adding humor to the proceedings is a highly stereotypical rude gay designer who tries to impede Chanel's success. The finale is a fashion show featuring actual Chanel designs from 1918 to 1959.

== Original cast and characters ==
Character	Broadway (1969)	First National Tour (1971)
Coco Chanel	Katharine Hepburn	Katharine Hepburn
Louis Greff	George Rose	George Rose
Pignol	Jeanne Arnold	Jeanne Arnold
Sebastian Baye	René Auberjonois	Daniel Davis
Grand Duke Alexandrovitch	Bob Avian	Bob Avian
Docaton	Eve March	Eve March
Papa	Jon Cypher	Jon Cypher
Claire	Graciela Daniele	Denise Mauthe
Eugene Bernstone	Robert Fitch	Ted Agress
Duke of Glenallen	Michael Allinson	Michael Allinson
Dwight Berkwit	Will B. Able	Will B. Able
Georges	David Holliday	Don Chastain
Solange	Suzanne Rogers	Brenda Lynn
Noelle	Gale Dixon	Lana Shaw
Simone	Charlene Ryan	Charlene Ryan
Helene	Maggie Task	Joan Shea

== Musical numbers ==
Act I

- Overture
- But That's the Way You Are - Alex
- The World Belongs to the Young - Coco
- Let's Go Home - Georges
- Mademoiselle Cliche de Paris - Coco
- On the Corner of the Rue Cambon - Coco
- The Money Rings Out Like Freedom - Coco & Ensemble
- A Brand New Dress - Noelle
- A Woman Is How She Loves - Georges
- Gabrielle - Papa
- Coco - Coco
- The Preparation - Coco & Company

Act II

- Entre D'acte
- Fiasco - Sebastian
- When Your Lover Says Goodbye - Greff
- Coco (Reprise) - Coco
- Ohrbach's, Bloomingdale's, Best & Saks -Coco & The Buyers
- Ohrbach's, Bloomingdale's, Best & Saks (Reprise) - Coco and Ensemble
- Always Mademoiselle - Coco and the Mannequins

A cast recording was released by Paramount Records in 1970. It was reissued on CD by MCA Records in 1997.

== Production ==
After 40 previews, the Broadway production opened on December 18, 1969, at the Mark Hellinger Theatre, where it ran for 329 performances. The show was directed by Michael Benthall and choreographed by Michael Bennett. Ann Reinking was in the chorus in one of her first Broadway shows. Joan Copeland was Hepburn's standby, and Danielle Darrieux replaced Hepburn eight months into the run, but without the drawing power of a major star the poorly reviewed show closed two months later.

Hepburn was scheduled to star in a West End production, but when the Theatre Royal, Drury Lane proved to be unavailable she refused to consider other venues and the project was abandoned. She headed the cast of the US national tour, which opened in Cleveland on January 11, 1971, the day after Chanel's death, which the star acknowledged at the final curtain call. She continued with the tour through June, when it ended at the Dorothy Chandler Pavilion in Los Angeles. Although reviews in most cities were mediocre, it played to sold-out houses everywhere. Despite its financial success, executives at Paramount Pictures, which had financed the original Broadway production - at $900,000, the most expensive show in Broadway history at the time - in exchange for the cast album and film rights, opted not to transfer Coco to the big screen.

During the autumn of 1971, Ginger Rogers starred in a stock tour of Coco that played the Westbury Music Festival, the South Shore Music Circus and the Valley Forge Music Fair. The tour was directed by Fred Hebert and choreographed by Larry Fuller.

Coco was produced as a staged concert by 42nd Street Moon in San Francisco in April and May 2008, starring Andrea Marcovicci in the title role. The production played for a total of 16 performances. It was directed by Mark D. Kaufmann and choreographed by Jayne Zaban. Marcovicci revisited the role in September 2010 for the show's first New York revival as part of the York Theatre Company's Musicals in Mufti.

Coco was presented in London's Sadler's Wells, in 2011, as part of the Lost Musicals project. Ian Marshall Fisher directed, Chris Walker, music director. Coco was played by Sara Kestelman and cast included Edward Petherbridge.

== Awards and nominations ==
=== Original Broadway production ===
Year	Award	Category	Nominee	Result
1970	Tony Award	Best Musical		Nominated
1970	Tony Award	Best Actress in a Musical	Katharine Hepburn	Nominated
1970	Tony Award	Best Featured Actor in a Musical	René Auberjonois	Won
1970	Tony Award	Best Featured Actor in a Musical	George Rose	Nominated
1970	Tony Award	Best Direction of a Musical	Michael Benthall	Nominated
1970	Tony Award	Best Choreography	Michael Bennett	Nominated
1970	Tony Award	Best Costume Design	Cecil Beaton	Won
1970	Theatre World Award		David Holliday	Won
