= When You Hear Lou, You've Heard It All =

Studio album by Lou Rawls
- Released: 1977
- Recorded: 1977
- Studios: Sigma Sound, Philadelphia, Pennsylvania
- Genres: Philadelphia soul, jazz
- Length: 37:49
- Label: Philadelphia International
- Producers: Kenny Gamble, Leon Huff, Von Gray, Sherman Marshall, Bobby Martin, Phillip Terry

Lou Rawls chronology
Unmistakably Lou (1977)	When You Hear Lou, You've Heard It All (1977)	Let Me Be Good to You (1979)

Professional ratings
Review scores
Source	Rating
AllMusic	4.5/5 stars
The New Rolling Stone Record Guide	4/5 stars

When You Hear Lou, You've Heard It All is a 1977 album by American R&B singer Lou Rawls, released on the Philadelphia International Records label. Only four tracks were produced by Gamble & Huff, with the remainder shared among other producers. The album's lead single "Lady Love", while only a moderate R&B hit, proved successful in the crossover market, becoming Rawls's last single to enter the top 30 on the Billboard Hot 100. When You Hear Lou, You've Heard It All peaked at No. 13 on the R&B albums chart and No. 41 pop.

The title of the album is a play on the-then current Budweiser advertising slogan "When you say Budweiser, you've said it all". The Budweiser company had been sponsors of Rawls' live shows in 1976 and 1977, and he could be heard at the time singing on television commercials for the company. (Rawls's 1978 live album Lou Rawls Live includes a short performance of the original "When you say..." jingle.)

== Track listing ==
1. "Lady Love" (Von Gray, Sherman Marshall) – 4:01
2. "I Wish It Were Yesterday" (Bobby Martin, Lee Phillips) – 3:27
3. "One Life to Live" (Kenny Gamble, Leon Huff) – 3:53
4. "Dollar Green" (Bobby Martin) – 3:09
5. "Trade Winds" (Ralph MacDonald, William Salter) – 3:47
6. "There Will Be Love" (Gamble, Huff) – 4:20
7. "Unforgettable" (Irving Gordon) – 3:25
8. "That Would Do It for Me" (Gamble, Huff) – 3:13
9. "If I Coulda, Woulda, Shoulda" (Gamble, Huff) – 4:32
10. "Not the Staying Kind" (Michael Burton) – 3:52

== Personnel ==
- Lou Rawls – vocals
- Barbara Ingram, Carla Benton, Yvette Benson – backing vocals
- Charles Collins – drums
- Michael "Sugarbear" Foreman – bass
- Dennis Harris, Roland Chambers – guitar
- Edward Green, Leon Huff – keyboards
- Davis Cruse – congas, bongos
- Don Renaldo – strings, horns

== Singles ==
- "Lady Love" (US Pop No. 24, US R&B No. 21)
- "One Life to Live" (US R&B No. 32, AC No. 10)
- "There Will Be Love" (US R&B No. 76)

== Charts ==
Chart (1977–78)	Peak position
Canada Top Albums/CDs (RPM)	35
US Billboard 200	41
US Top R&B/Hip-Hop Albums (Billboard)	13
