= Jordan Christopher =

American actor

- Born: Jordan Christopher Zankoff; October 23, 1940; Youngstown, Ohio, U.S.
- Died: January 21, 1996 (aged 55); New York, New York, U.S.
- Spouse: Sybil Burton (m. 1965)
- Children: 2

Jordan Christopher (October 23, 1940 – January 21, 1996) was an American actor and singer. He was the lead singer of the Wild Ones, who recorded the original version of the rock classic "Wild Thing" after Christopher had left the band.

== Early life ==
Born in Youngstown, Ohio, to Macedonian immigrants Eli and Dorothy Zankoff, he moved at an early age to Akron, where his father ran a downtown bar.

== Career ==
=== Music ===
Christopher became interested in singing with the rise of rock and roll, spending much of his time at the music clubs in Akron's black neighborhoods. He formed a doo-wop group called the Fascinations, which released unsuccessful singles on several small labels in the early 1960s.

Christopher's break came when he joined the Wild Ones, the house band at New York's Peppermint Lounge, as singer and guitarist. After a residency at the Peppermint Lounge of eight months, the Wild Ones were hired to play at Arthur, the Manhattan discothèque operated by Sybil Williams, then recently divorced from actor Richard Burton. Within a month of meeting at an audition for the nightclub, Christopher and Williams began dating and married in June 1965.

Thanks to the publicity Williams received as the ex-wife of Richard Burton, there was great interest in Arthur, and the Wild Ones were able to secure a recording contract with United Artists Records, releasing an album, The Arthur Sound. However, Christopher left the band shortly after its release to develop an acting career. Producer Gerry Granahan later commissioned Brill Building songwriter Chip Taylor to write a song specifically for the band. "Wild Thing" – sung by the band's new lead vocalist, Chuck Alden, not Christopher – was the result.

=== Acting ===
Christopher acted in several films including The Fat Spy (1966), Return of the Seven (1966), The Tree (1969), Pigeons (1971), Star 80 (1983), Brainstorm (1983) and That's Life! (1986). His most celebrated role is likely as a dissolute rock star in the cult film Angel, Angel, Down We Go (1969), in which he played the male lead opposite Jennifer Jones.

He also appeared on stage, including on Broadway in Sleuth. Christopher continued to act intermittently.

=== Other pursuits ===
He worked behind the scenes with his wife in her operation of the New Theatre on 54th Street in New York City and Bay Street Theater in Sag Harbor, New York.

== Personal life ==
A marriage early in his adulthood ended but produced a daughter, Jodi.

On June 13, 1965, Christopher married Arthur discothèque operator Sybil Williams—who was eleven years his senior—about a month after dating. They had a daughter, Amy, in 1967.

Christopher died of a heart attack on January 21, 1996, at age 55.

== Filmography ==
Year	Title	Role	Notes
1966	The Fat Spy	Frankie	
1966	The Mike Douglas Show	Self/Co-host	3 episodes
1966	Return of the Seven	Manuel De Norte	First sequel to The Magnificent Seven
1966-1967	The Merv Griffin Show	Self	2 episodes
1969	The Tree	Buck Gagnon	
1969	Angel, Angel, Down We Go	Bogart Peter Stuyvesant	
1969	The Name of the Game	Bruce Roxton	Episode: "Love-In at Ground Zero"
1970	The Sidelong Glances of a Pigeon Kicker	Jonathan	Original title: "Pigeons"
1974	The ABC Afternoon Playbreak	Adam	Episode: "Heart in Hiding"
1980-1981	Secrets of Midland Heights	Guy Millington	11 episodes
1983	Star 80	Peter Rose	
1983	Hart to Hart	Alex Fordham	Episode: "Harts on the Scent"
1983	Brainstorm	Gordy Forbes	
1984	Paper Dolls	Oliver	pilot episode
1985	Seduced	Howell	TV film
1986	That's Life!	Dr. Keith Romanis	
1986-1987	Scarecrow and Mrs. King	Norton Scott/Ren Lepard	2 episodes
