= Lady Love (Lou Rawls song) =

Single by Lou Rawls

Single by Lou Rawls

from the album When You Hear Lou, You've Heard It All
- B-side: "Not the Staying Kind"
- Released: January 1978
- Studio: Sigma Sound, Philadelphia, Pennsylvania
- Genre: R&B; jazz; disco; Philadelphia soul
- Length: 3:41
- Label: Philadelphia International Records
- Songwriters: Von Gray, Sherman Marshall
- Producers: Von Gray, Sherman Marshall, Jack Faith

Lou Rawls singles chronology
"See You When I Git There" (1977)	"Lady Love" (1978)	"One Life to Live" (1978)

"Lady Love" is a song written by Von Gray and Sherman Marshall. It became a hit single for Lou Rawls from his 1977 album When You Hear Lou, You've Heard It All. It was released as a single in January 1978 and peaked at No. 13 in Canada, No. 21 on Australia's Kent Music Report, No. 24 on the U.S. Billboard Hot 100, No. 20 on Cash Box, and went to No. 21 on the R&B chart.

On the Canadian and U.S. Adult Contemporary charts, "Lady Love" peaked at No. 5. The song is an airplay staple today on adult standards and smooth jazz radio stations.

== Personnel ==
- Lou Rawls – Vocals
- Barbara Ingram, Yvonne Gray, Carla Benton, Yvette Benson – backing vocals
- Charles Collins – drums
- Michael "Sugarbear" Foreman – bass
- Dennis Harris – guitar
- Edward Green, Von Gray, Leon Huff – keyboards
- Davis Cruse – bongos
- Don Renaldo – strings, horns
