= All Things in Time =

Studio album by Lou Rawls
- Released: June 7, 1976
- Recorded: November 1975–March 1976
- Studios: Sigma Sound, Philadelphia
- Genres: Philadelphia soul, jazz
- Length: 38:11
- Label: Philadelphia International
- Producers: Kenny Gamble, Leon Huff, Bunny Sigler, Dexter Wansel, Jack Faith, Bobby Martin

Lou Rawls chronology
She's Gone (1975)	All Things in Time (1976)	Unmistakably Lou (1977)

All Things in Time is an album by American R&B singer Lou Rawls, released in June 1976 on the Philadelphia International Records label. The album includes Rawls's most famous song, "You'll Never Find Another Love Like Mine".

== Background ==
Coming after a career lull, All Things in Time was Rawls's first album for PIR. At the time, he was the first artist to sign with PIR, after having already enjoyed a substantial recording career and chart success with other record labels. Recorded at Sigma Sound Studios and produced by Gamble & Huff, Bunny Sigler and Dexter Wansel, All Things in Time became an immediate success on the back of its lead single, "You'll Never Find Another Love Like Mine".

== Reception ==
Professional ratings
Review scores
Source	Rating
AllMusic	4.5/5 stars

All Things in Time was highly rated by critics upon release, due to the quality and variety of its material, production standards and Rawls' vocal performances. It is often cited as the best album of Rawls' tenure with PIR. In a retrospective review for AllMusic, Jason Elias described it as "not only one of Rawls' best albums, it's also one of the finest from Philadelphia International".

The album was Rawls' third R&B chart-topper (the first since 1966), and reached No. 7 on the Billboard 200. "You'll Never Find Another Love Like Mine" gave Rawls the biggest hit of his career, topping Billboard's R&B Songs chart and Adult Contemporary chart, and making No. 2 on the Billboard Hot 100.

== Track listing ==
Side one
No.	Title	Writer(s)	Length
1.	"You're the One"	Kenneth Gamble, Leon Huff	5:20
2.	"You'll Never Find Another Love Like Mine"	Gamble, Huff	4:28
3.	"Time"	Jack Faith, Allan Felder	2:55
4.	"Groovy People"	Gamble, Huff	3:20
5.	"Need You Forever"	Bunny Sigler	4:38

Side two
No.	Title	Writer(s)	Length
1.	"From Now On"	Sigler	4:57
2.	"Pure Imagination"	Leslie Bricusse, Anthony Newley	3:43
3.	"This Song Will Last Forever"	Gamble, Huff, Cary Gilbert	5:08
4.	"Let's Fall in Love All Over Again"	Bobby Martin	4:02

- In 2005, All Things in Time was reissued on CD by Edsel Records in the UK in a double package with Rawls' 1977 album, Unmistakably Lou.

== Personnel ==
- Kenneth Gamble – co-producer (tracks 1–2, 4, 8)
- Leon Huff – co-producer (tracks 1–2, 4, 8)
- Jack Faith – producer, musical arranger (track 3)
- Bunny Sigler – producer (tracks 5–6)
- Bobby Martin – producer (track 9), musical arranger (tracks 1–2, 4–5, 8–9)
- Richard Rome – musical arranger (track 6)
- Dexter Wansel – producer, musical arranger (track 7)
- Joe Tarsia – engineer
- Jim Gallagher – engineer
- Carl Paroulo – engineer
- Jay Mark – engineer
- Frank Laffitte – photos
- Ed Lee – design

== Charts ==
=== Weekly charts ===
Chart (1976)	Peak position
Canada Top Albums/CDs (RPM)	8
US Billboard 200	7
US Top R&B/Hip-Hop Albums (Billboard)	1

=== Year-end charts ===
Chart (1976)	Position
Canada Top Albums/CDs (RPM)	61
US Billboard 200	84
US Top R&B/Hip-Hop Albums (Billboard)	16

== Certifications ==
Region	Certification	Certified units/sales
Australia (ARIA)	Gold	20,000^{^}
^{^} Shipments figures based on certification alone.

== See also ==
- List of Billboard number-one R&B albums of 1976
