= Bill Kohlhaase =

American music critic

Bill Kohlhaase is an American music critic. He is best known for his work over decades for the Los Angeles Times and acquired a good reputation as a jazz journalist, interviewing and reviewing a number of top jazz musicians such as Miles Davis's band. Kohlhaase has regularly written the programs for the Playboy Jazz Festival and liner notes for jazz musicians. He maintains a blog, Cabbage Rabbit Review, that covers his range of interests: jazz and writing on jazz, modern fiction, graphic novels, organic gardening, and the culinary arts.
