= You'll Never Find Another Love Like Mine =

Single by Lou Rawls

from the album All Things in Time
- B-side: "Let's Fall in Love All Over Again"
- Released: May 28, 1976; March 4, 2016 (re-release date)
- Studio: Sigma Sound, Philadelphia, Pennsylvania
- Genre: Soul; smooth soul
- Length: 4:26 (album version); 3:36 (single edit)
- Label: Philadelphia International
- Songwriters: Kenny Gamble; Leon Huff
- Producers: Kenny Gamble; Leon Huff

Lou Rawls singles chronology
"A Natural Man" (1971)	"You'll Never Find Another Love Like Mine" (1976)	"Groovy People" (1976)

"You'll Never Find Another Love Like Mine" is a song written by Kenny Gamble and Leon Huff and performed by R&B and soul singer Lou Rawls on his 1976 album All Things in Time. The song proved to be Rawls' biggest hit, reaching number 1 on both the R&B in September 1976 and Easy Listening charts as well as number 6 on the dance chart and number 2 on the US Billboard Hot 100. This was the first and only time that one of Rawls' records reached Billboard's pop Top Ten.

The single went on to sell over a million copies and was certified gold by the RIAA.

== Chart performance ==
=== Weekly charts ===
Chart (1976–2016)	Peak position
Australia (KMR)	22
Belgium (Ultratop 50 Flanders)	10
Belgium (Ultratop 50 Wallonia)	5
Canada (RPM Top Singles)	2
Canada (RPM Adult Contemporary)	2
Netherlands (Single Top 100)	8
New Zealand (RIANZ)	16
South Africa (Springbok Radio)	1
UK Singles (OCC)	10
US Billboard Hot 100	2
US Adult Contemporary (Billboard)	1
US Dance Club Songs (Billboard)	6
US Hot R&B/Hip-Hop Songs (Billboard)	1

=== Year-end charts ===
Chart (1976)	Rank
Canada	38
South Africa	13
US Billboard Hot 100	32
US Billboard Easy Listening	9

Chart (1977)	Position
Australia (Kent Music Report)	97

== Certifications ==
Region	Certification	Certified units/sales
Canada (Music Canada)	Gold	75,000^{^}
United States (RIAA)	Gold	1,000,000^{^}
^{^} Shipments figures based on certification alone.

== See also ==
- List of number-one R&B singles of 1976 (U.S.)
- List of number-one adult contemporary singles of 1976 (U.S.)
