= Let Me Be Good to You (song) =

"Let Me Be Good to You" is a song written by Kenneth Gamble and Leon Huff and first recorded by Lou Rawls. Released as a single, the song reached #11 on Billboard's R&B chart in July 1979. The Sweethearts of Sigma sang background vocals on the recording. The song is also the title track of a 1979 album by Rawls.
