= Sybil Christopher =

Welsh actress, theatre director and nightclub proprietor (1929–2013)

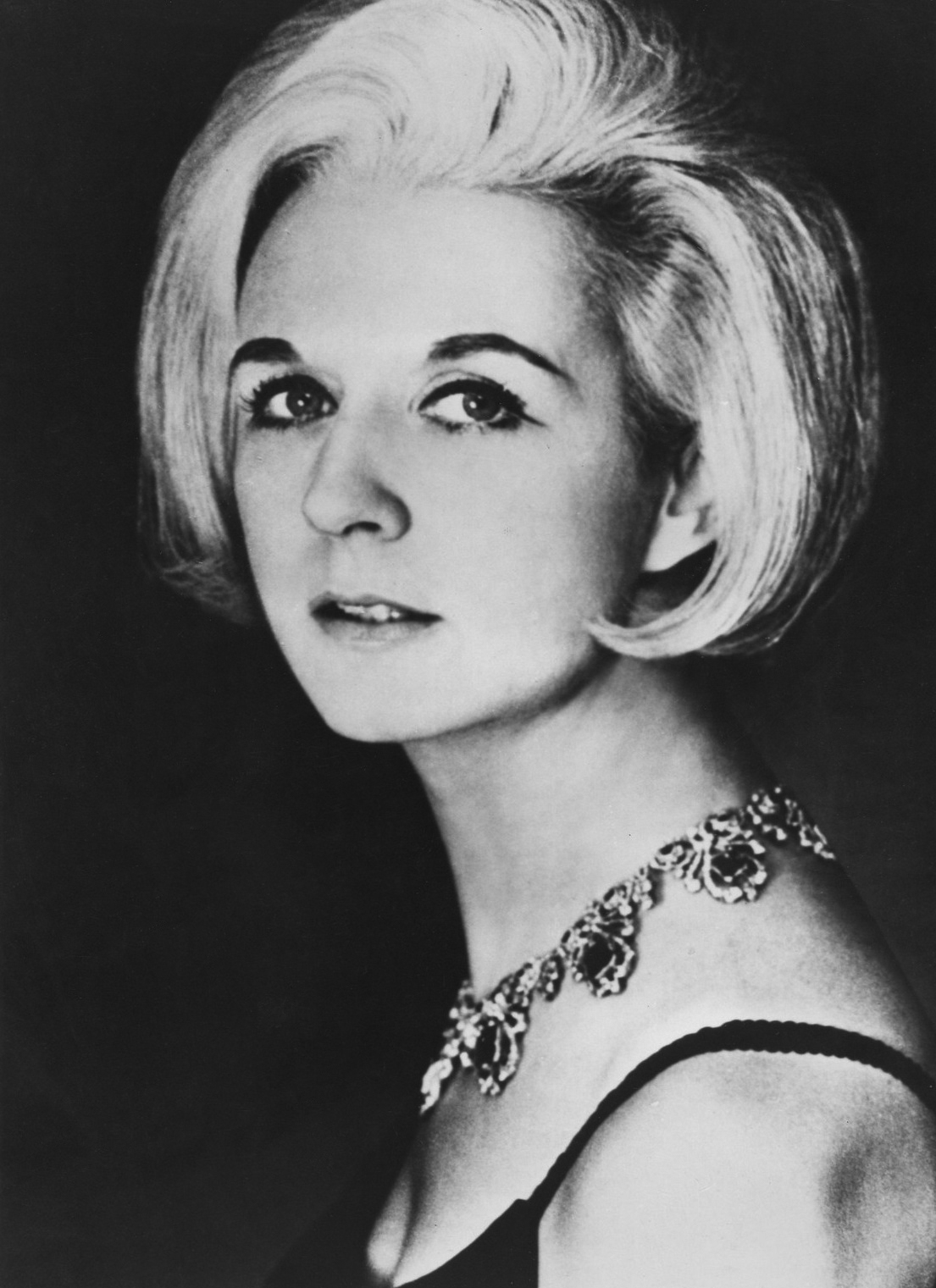
- Christopher in 1955
- Born: Sybil Williams; 27 March 1929; Tylorstown, Mid Glamorgan, Wales
- Died: 7 March 2013 (aged 83); Manhattan, New York, U.S.
- Other name: Sybil Burton
- Education: London Academy of Music and Dramatic Art
- Occupations: Actress; theatre director; nightclub owner
- Years active: 1946–2013
- Spouses: Richard Burton (m. 1949; div. 1963) Jordan Christopher (m. 1965; died 1996)
- Children: 3, including Kate Burton
- Relatives: Michael Ritchie (son-in-law)

Sybil Christopher (née Williams; 27 March 1929 – 7 March 2013) was a Welsh actress, theatre director, and founder of popular celebrity New York nightclub Arthur. She came into the public eye as the first wife of Richard Burton.

== Biography ==
Sybil Williams was born on 27 March 1929, in Tylorstown, Mid Glamorgan, Wales, in family David Williams and Mabel Airlys. She attended the London Academy of Dramatic Arts (LAMDA), meeting Richard Burton during the filming of The Last Days of Dolwyn (1949). After their marriage, she retired from acting, performing only a few times, and generally on stage rather than on film. The marriage ended famously in 1963, when Burton began an affair with Elizabeth Taylor. She divorced Burton in 1963 on grounds of "abandonment and cruel and inhumane treatment", receiving a $1 million settlement and custody of their children.

In 1965, she co-founded Arthur, a nightclub in Manhattan at 154 East 54th Street, at the site of the former El Morocco. To open the nightclub, she raised money from numerous celebrities and well-known artists, including Julie Andrews, Leonard Bernstein, Roddy McDowall, and Stephen Sondheim. It became a popular nightclub for celebrities during its short tenure (1965–1969). Frequent patrons included Truman Capote, Wilt Chamberlain, Roger Daltrey, Princess Margaret, Rudolf Nureyev, Lee Remick, Andy Warhol, Angela Lansbury and Tennessee Williams. D.J. Terry Noel claimed to have invented "mixing" in the club, layering music from two separate turntables.

She then returned to theatre, founding the New Theatre on 54th Street in New York, and Bay Street Theater in Sag Harbor in 1991.

== Family ==
She had two daughters with Richard Burton, Katherine "Kate" Burton (born 10 September 1957) and Jessica Burton (born 1959).

On June 13, 1965, in New York City, she married 24-year-old Jordan Christopher, a singer and actor, whom she met when his band the Wild Ones auditioned to play at Arthur. The couple raised his daughter from a previous marriage and they had a child together, Amy Christopher (born May 1967).

== Notes ==
1. According to The New York Times, Sybil Christopher died on Thursday previous to the article's publication, meaning 7 March. However, The Hollywood Reporter and The London Guardian reports she died on 9 March.
