= Dave Thomas (rugby union, born 1941) =

- Full name: David Lynn Thomas
- Born: 29 April 1941 Pontrhydyfen, Wales
- Died: 3 January 2017 (aged 75) Bridgend, Wales
- School: Dyffryn Grammar School
- Occupation: Civil engineer

Rugby union career
- Position: Centre / Wing
International career
Years	Team	Apps	(Points)
1961	Wales	1	(0)

David Lynn Thomas (29 April 1941 — 3 January 2017) was a Welsh international rugby union player.

Born in Pontrhydyfen, Thomas was educated at Dyffryn Grammar School and Bridgend Technical College.

Thomas, a civil engineer by profession, played his early rugby with Maesteg but spent most of his career at Aberavon, for which he scored 92 tries. Capped once by Wales, Thomas got his opportunity during the 1961 Five Nations, appearing as a centre in a win over Ireland in Cardiff. He played an uncapped match against Fiji in 1964, crossing over for two tries in a Wales victory. After leaving Aberavon in 1968, Thomas returned to Maesteg and became club captain.

== See also ==
- List of Wales national rugby union players
