= Burton & Taylor =

- Written by: William Ivory
- Directed by: Richard Laxton
- Starring: Helena Bonham Carter; Dominic West
- Music by: John Lunn
- Country of origin: United Kingdom
- Original language: English

Production
- Producers: Lachlan MacKinnon; Jessica Pope; Andrew Wood
- Running time: 82 mins
- Production companies: BBC; BBC America

Original release
- Network: BBC Four
- Release: 22 July 2013

Burton & Taylor is a BBC Four TV film written by William Ivory and directed by Richard Laxton, starring Helena Bonham Carter and Dominic West as legendary acting duo and former couple, Elizabeth Taylor and Richard Burton during their preparation for a 1983 theatrical production of the play, Private Lives.

== Plot ==
In 1983, movie stars Richard Burton (Dominic West) and Elizabeth Taylor (Helena Bonham Carter) are in New York City preparing to perform the Noël Coward play, Private Lives. The pair have been married and divorced twice before, but remain friends despite tensions. She still dreams of a reconciliation. However, Richard is currently attached to his younger girlfriend Sally Hay and this makes Elizabeth jealous.

Richard has poor health and is a recovering alcoholic, but Elizabeth continues to drink excessively and abuse prescription drugs. During the play's rehearsal period, she makes the process difficult. While he is in his element and receives praise, she has a lack of confidence. Realising she is frightened, Richard promises to support her through the show's run and he helps keep her pill addiction in check.

People flock to see the two celebrities on stage when Private Lives opens at the Lunt-Fontaine Theatre. The initial reviews are less than positive and Richard is uncomfortable when he realises that aspects of the play are a little too similar to their real lives. He proposes cancelling the show altogether, but Elizabeth (who is also the producer) refuses to quit.

Despite her wish to see the play through, Elizabeth continues to prove challenging; she arrives late for shows, brings all her pets along and mugs for the audience. Richard's patience wears thin and they eventually have a fight that comes to blows. After they apologise to one another, he invites her to have dinner. She accepts.

At dinner, the former lovers fondly recall their younger and wilder days. Elizabeth then wants to talk about their current relationship. Richard steers the conversation towards work. Furious that he's discounting her feelings, she storms out of the restaurant.

In retaliation for his behaviour, Elizabeth doesn't show up for the next night's show. Her absence hurts the show's success so greatly that the theater puts the play on hold until she returns. During the break, Richard and Sally get married in Las Vegas without telling anyone. Elizabeth finds out by reading a newspaper and has an emotional breakdown. Her assistant accuses Richard of intentionally breaking Elizabeth's heart. Emotionally drained, he barely resists the urge to binge drink again.

After the play's run ends, Richard confronts Elizabeth about her drug abuse, which she begrudgingly acknowledges. They both admit to still loving one another, but he says that being with her will destroy him. They agree to remain friends and stay in touch.

Shortly thereafter, Elizabeth enters the Betty Ford Center for treatment. Richard and Sally live in Switzerland until he dies of a cerebral hemorrhage in 1984. Richard and Elizabeth talk on the phone every few days during the last months of his life.

== Cast ==
- Helena Bonham Carter as Elizabeth Taylor
- Dominic West as Richard Burton
- William Hope as John Cullum
- Michael Jibson as Mike
- Lenora Crichlow as Chen Sam
- Sarah Hadland as Kathryn Walker
- Stanley Townsend as Milton Katselas
- Greg Hicks as Zev Buffman

== Production ==
The film was mainly shot in Chiswick and Tower Hamlets, with filming lasting only 18 days. Bonham Carter visited an astrologer whilst preparing for her role as Elizabeth Taylor as she wanted a different take on Taylor's character and persona. Bonham Carter and West both have mentioned in interviews that they listened to numerous recordings of the stars, as well as reading books such as Furious Love by Sam Kashner and Nancy Schoenberger. West even visited Burton's birthplace in attempt to discover more about the actor.

Costume designer Susannah Buxton only recreated two of Taylor's outfits, the gown worn during Private Lives and Taylor's birthday dress. The rest of the clothes Buxton created for Bonham Carter to wear were made from freelance tailors based on Bonham Carter's interpretation of the character, and designed to tone her look down subtly so it did not distract. Though Taylor was known for her jewellery, Buxton didn't design much jewelry for Bonham Carter as she was afraid it would distract the audience if she wore as much as Taylor did. Therefore, she only copied two pieces of jewellery Taylor was known for, a Cartier bracelet and a pair of diamond earrings. For Dominic West as Richard Burton, Buxton sourced vintage suits and made one that would lend Burton's silhouette to West. As West was much younger during the filming than Burton was during the events portrayed, West's clothing ensembles had to be chosen in order to give him the "same strong, masculine and distinguished air" as Burton, such as double-breasted suits to broaden West's shoulders and accentuate his height.

== Reception ==
In its original airing on BBC Four, Burton & Taylor received an impressive 1.13 million viewers.

The film received critical acclaim. On Rotten Tomatoes, the film has an approval rating of 100%, based on 11 reviews, with an average score of 9.3/10. At Metacritic, which assigns a rating out of 100 to reviews from mainstream critics, the film received an average score of 81, based on 17 reviews, which indicates "universal acclaim". Both Bonham Carter and West received widespread praise for their performances in the film, with Alex Hardy of The Times labelling the drama as "perfect" and added of Bonham Carter's performance as Taylor, "(She) conducted the world around her in a sing-song voice that moved octaves within one phrase, the fragile sliding into the manipulative". Sam Wollaston of The Guardian wrote "Bonham Carter and West are excellent. There's a crackle between them... They become two people who clearly are and always will be in love, but can never be together, for reasons of health and safety. It is another very good double act".

The actor Robert Hardy, who was an old friend of Burton's, was not impressed by West's performance, saying, "He was hopeless. He wasn’t tough enough, he wasn’t dangerous enough, he wasn’t Welsh enough." However, he appreciated Bonham Carter's performance, saying, "She was brilliant, absolutely brilliant. She got the spirit of her and sounded like her."

== Awards and nominations ==
Year	Award	Category	Nominee	Result
2013	Golden Globe Award	Best Actress – Miniseries or Television Film	Helena Bonham Carter	Nominated
2013	Screen Actors Guild Awards	Outstanding Performance by a Female Actor in a Miniseries or Television Movie	Helena Bonham Carter	Nominated
2013	Royal Television Society Craft & Design Awards	Costume Design - Drama	Susannah Buxton	Won
2013	Royal Television Society Craft & Design Awards	Make Up Design - Drama	Lucy Cain	Won
2013	Satellite Awards	Best Miniseries or Television Film		Nominated
2013	Satellite Awards	Best Actor – Miniseries or Television Film	Dominic West	Nominated
2013	Satellite Awards	Best Actress – Miniseries or Television Film	Helena Bonham Carter	Nominated
2014	British Academy Television Awards	Best Actor	Dominic West	Nominated
2014	British Academy Television Awards	Best Actress	Helena Bonham Carter	Nominated
2014	Critics' Choice Television Awards	Best Movie/Miniseries		Nominated
2014	Critics' Choice Television Awards	Best Actress in a Movie/Miniseries	Helena Bonham Carter	Nominated
2014	Primetime Emmy Awards	Outstanding Lead Actress in a Miniseries or a Movie	Helena Bonham Carter	Nominated
