= Dyffryn, Neath Port Talbot =

Dyffryn, Neath Port Talbot may refer to:

- Dyffryn Cellwen
- Dyffryn Clydach
- Dyffryn School
