= Richard Burton =

Welsh actor (1925–1984)

Richard Burton CBE
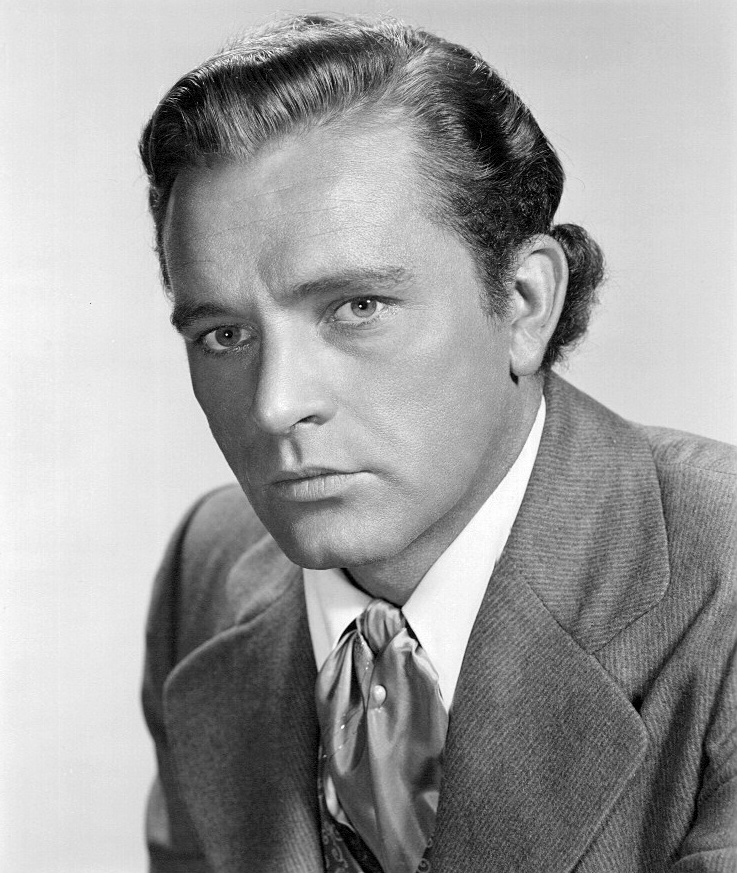
- Burton in 1956
- Born: Richard Walter Jenkins Jr. 10 November 1925; Pontrhydyfen, Glamorgan, Wales
- Died: 5 August 1984 (aged 58); Céligny, Switzerland
- Burial place: Old Cemetery ("Vieux Cimetière") of Céligny
- Education: Exeter College, Oxford
- Occupation: Actor
- Years active: 1943–1984
- Works: Full list
- Spouses: Sybil Williams (m. 1949; div. 1963) Elizabeth Taylor (m. 1964; div. 1974) (m. 1975; div. 1976) Suzy Miller (m. 1976; div. 1982) Sally Hay (m. 1983)
- Children: 4, including Kate Burton
- Relatives: Michael Ritchie (son-in-law)
- Awards: Full list

Richard Walter Burton (/ˈbɜːrtən/; né Jenkins Jr.; 10 November 1925 – 5 August 1984) was a Welsh actor.

Noted for his powerful presence and baritone voice, Burton had an expansive film and stage career. He made his feature film debut in the British drama The Last Days of Dolwyn in 1949 and gained attention for his role as Philip Ashley, the protagonist in the romantic mystery My Cousin Rachel earning his first Academy Award nomination for Best Supporting Actor.

On stage, Burton established himself as a Shakespearean actor, starring in roles such as roles such as Prince Hal in Henry IV, Part 1 (1951) and Henry IV, Part 2 (1951), Henry V of England in Henry V (1951), Ferdinand in The Tempest (1951), Prince Hamlet in Hamlet (1953), Sir Toby Belch in Twelfth Night (1953), Gnaeus Marcius Coriolanus in Coriolanus (1953), and Othello in Othello (1955). He was called "the natural successor to Olivier" by critic Kenneth Tynan. Burton's perceived failure to live up to those expectations disappointed some critics and colleagues; his heavy drinking added to his reputation as a great performer who had wasted his talent.

Throughout his career Burton received numerous accolades, including a BAFTA Award, a Golden Globe Award and a Grammy Award. He received the Tony Award for Best Actor in a Musical for his portrayal of King Arthur in the Lerner and Loewe musical Camelot (1960). Despite seven Academy Award nominations Burton failed to win an Oscar; he was nominated for his performances in My Cousin Rachel (1952), The Robe (1953), Becket (1964), The Spy Who Came In from the Cold (1965), Who's Afraid of Virginia Woolf? (1966), Anne of the Thousand Days (1969) and Equus (1977).

Burton has remained closely associated in the public mind with his second and third wife, Elizabeth Taylor due to their publicly turbulent relationship, in which they married and divorced twice, and starred in eleven films together.

== Early life ==
=== Childhood ===
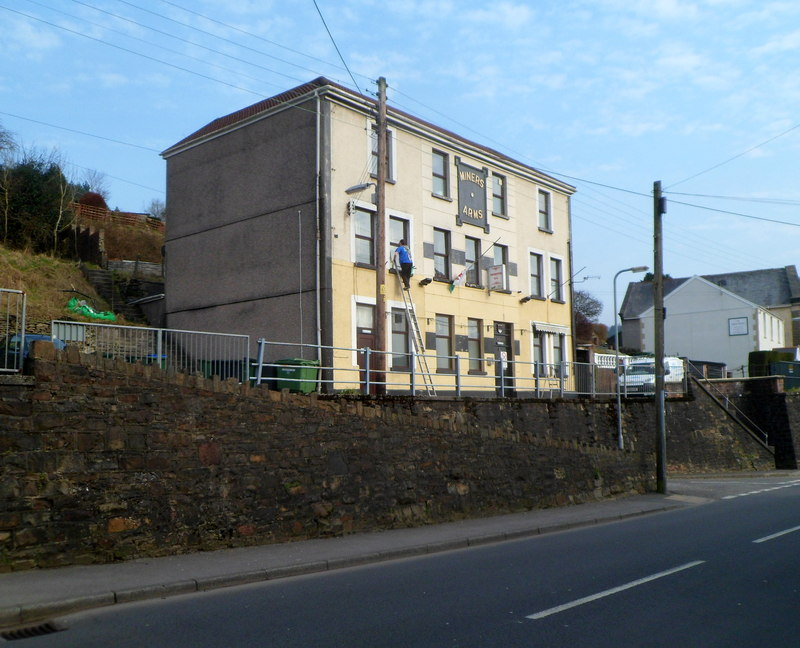
The Miners Arms in the village of Pontrhydyfen. Here is where Burton's mother worked before marriage and where Burton's father regularly drank.

Burton was born Richard Walter Jenkins Jr. on 10 November 1925 in a house at 2 Dan-y-bont in Pontrhydyfen, Glamorgan, Wales. He was the twelfth of thirteen children born into the Welsh-speaking family of Richard Walter Jenkins Sr. (5 March 1876 – 25 March 1957), and Edith Maude Jenkins (née Thomas; 28 January 1883 – 31 October 1927). Jenkins Sr., called Daddy Ni by the family, was a coal miner, while his mother worked as a barmaid at a pub called the Miners Arms in the village where she met her husband. They married, without approval of her parents, at Neath Register Office on 24 December 1900. Biographer Melvyn Bragg quoted Burton as saying that Daddy Ni was a "twelve-pints-a-day man" who sometimes went off on drinking and gambling sprees for weeks, and that "he looked very much like me". Jenkins Sr. was badly burned in a mining explosion. His father, Thomas Jenkins, also a miner, had also had a serious mining accident and had relied on a wheelchair.

Burton described his mother as "a very strong woman" and "a religious soul with fair hair and a beautiful face". But he was not quite two years old when she died on 31 October 1927, six days after the birth of Graham Jenkins, the family's thirteenth child. Edith's death was a result of postpartum infections; Burton believed it had occurred because of "hygiene neglect". According to biographer Michael Munn, Edith "was fastidiously clean", but her exposure to the dust from the coal mines resulted in her death. Following Edith's death, Richard's elder sister Cecilia, whom he affectionately addressed as "Cis", and her husband Elfed James, also a miner, took him under their care until the age of seventeen. Richard lived with Cis, Elfed and their two daughters, Marian and Rhianon, in their three-bedroom terraced cottage on 73 Caradoc Street, Taibach, a suburban district in Port Talbot, which Bragg describes as "a tough steel town, English-speaking, grind and grime".

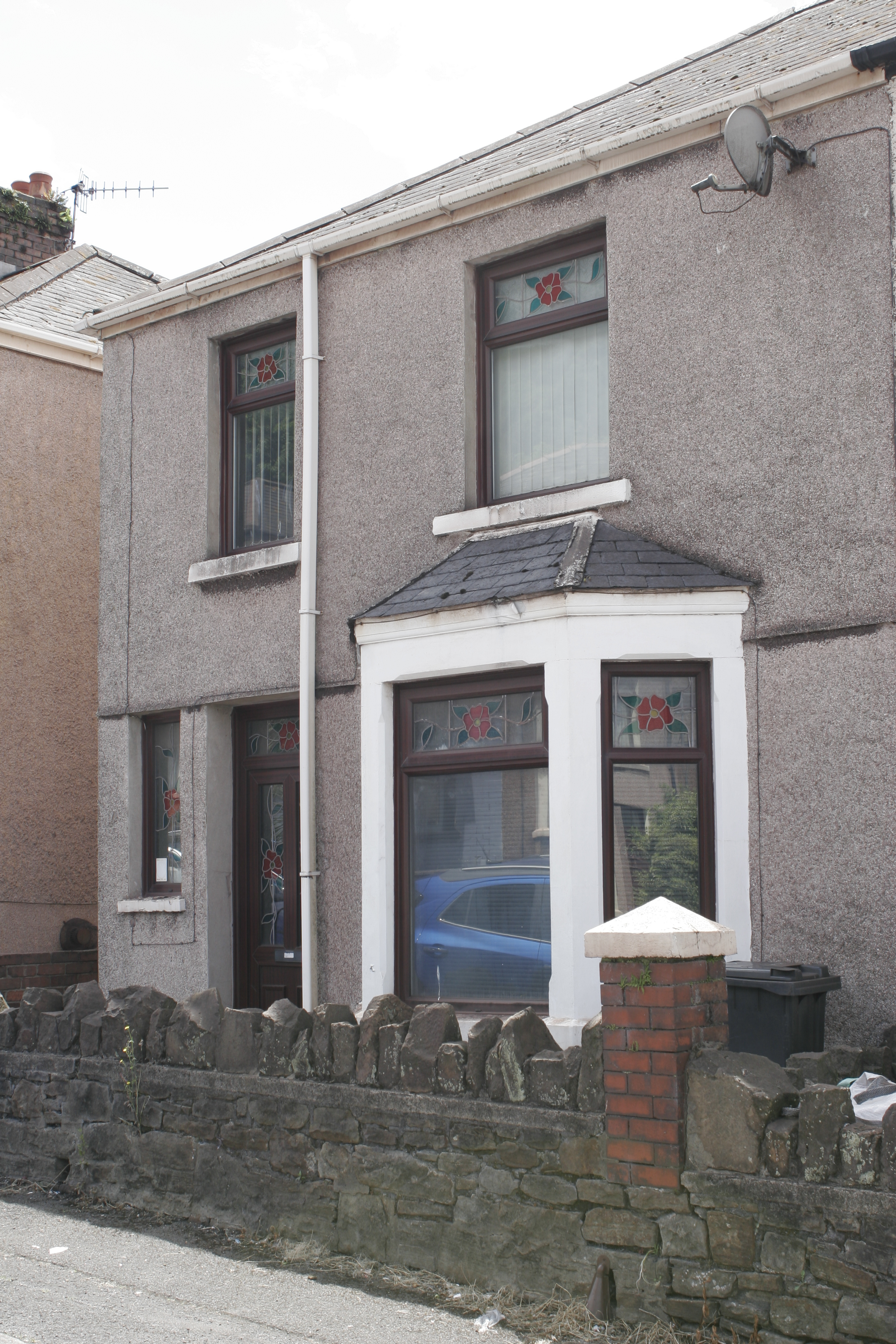
Childhood home where Richard lived with sister Cis and her family

Burton remained grateful and loving to Cis throughout his life, later going on to say: "When my mother died she, my sister, had become my mother, and more mother to me than any mother could ever have been ... I was immensely proud of her ... she felt all tragedies except her own". Daddy Ni would occasionally visit the homes of his grown daughters but was otherwise absent. Another important figure in Richard's early life was Ifor, his brother, 19 years his senior. A miner and rugby union player, Ifor "ruled the household with the proverbial firm hand". He was also responsible for nurturing a passion for rugby in young Richard. Although Richard also played cricket, tennis, and table tennis, biographer Bragg notes rugby union football to be his greatest interest. On rugby, Burton said he "would rather have played for Wales at Cardiff Arms Park than Hamlet at The Old Vic". The Welsh rugby union centre, Bleddyn Williams, believed the young Richard "had distinct possibilities as a player".

From the age of five to eight, Richard Jenkins was educated at the Eastern Primary School in Port Talbot, and he attended the boys' segment of the same school from eight to twelve years old. In March 1937, he took and passed a scholarship exam for admission into Port Talbot Secondary School (Note: later known as the Dyffryn School.) Biographer Hollis Alpert notes that both Daddy Ni and Ifor considered Richard's education to be "of paramount importance" and planned to send him to the University of Oxford. Richard became the first member of his family to go to secondary school. He displayed an excellent speaking and singing voice from childhood, even winning an eisteddfod prize as a boy soprano. While a pupil at Port Talbot Secondary School, Richard also showed immense interest in reading poetry as well as English and Welsh literature. He earned pocket money by running messages, hauling horse manure, and delivering newspapers.

=== Philip Burton years ===
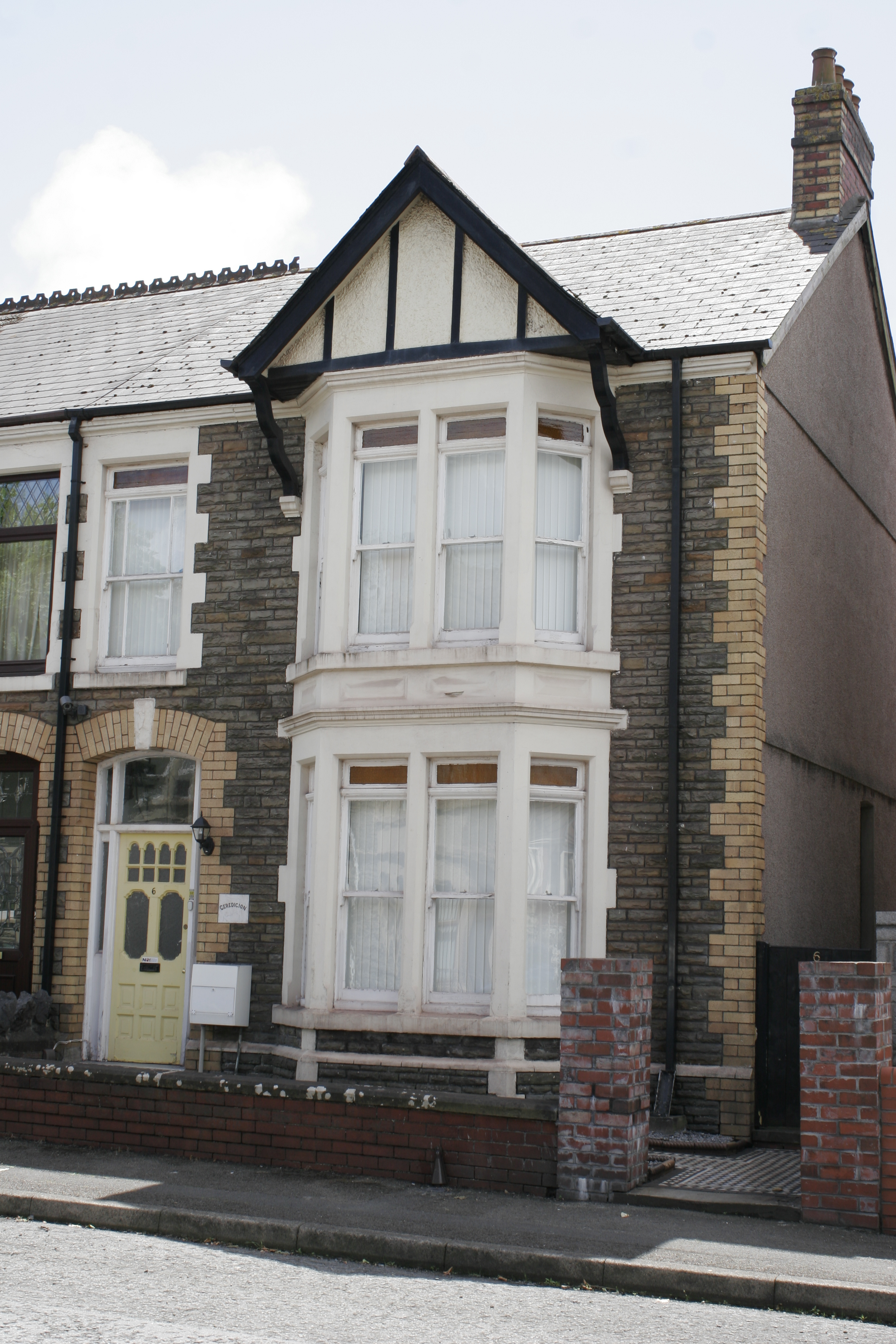
Home of Elizabeth 'Ma' Smith in Port Talbot where both Philip Burton and Richard Jenkins, later Burton, lodged

In 1939, Richard was bolstered by winning a certificate at Maesteg Town Hall during a local eisteddfod and wanted to repeat his success. He chose to sing Sir Arthur Sullivan's "Orpheus with his Lute" (1866), which biographer Alpert thought "a difficult composition". He requested the help of his schoolmaster, Philip Burton, (Note: Philip taught Mathematics and English at Port Talbot Secondary School in addition to holding plays for the school.) but his voice cracked during their practice sessions. This incident marked the beginning of his association with Philip. Philip later recalled, "His voice was tough to begin with but with constant practice it became memorably beautiful." Richard made his first foray into theatre with a minor role in his school's production of the Irish playwright George Bernard Shaw's The Apple Cart. He decided to leave school by the end of 1941 and work as a miner like Elfed. However, he ended up with a job, which he came to dislike intensely, at the local Taibach Co-operative retail store as a draper's assistant in the menswear department, limited at that time by war-time rationing. He also simultaneously considered other professions for his future, including boxing, religious ministry and singing. It was also during this period that Richard took up smoking and drinking despite being underage.

One day in 1964 when Richard [Burton] was playing in Hamlet on Broadway, he and I were interviewed jointly in a private corner of an Eighth Avenue bar and restaurant much frequented by theatre people. We had a live audience of one, Richard's wife, Elizabeth Taylor. One of the questions aimed at me was, "How did you come to adopt him?" [...] Richard jumped in with "He didn't adopt me; I adopted him." There was much truth in that. He needed me, and, as I realised later, he set out to get me.

— Philip Burton in his 1992 autobiography Richard & Philip: The Burtons : a Book of Memories.

When he joined the Port Talbot Squadron 499 of the Air Training Corps section of the Royal Air Force (RAF) as a cadet, he re-encountered Philip, who was the squadron commander. He also joined the Taibach Youth Centre, a youth drama group founded by Meredith Jones (Note: Jones was instrumental in helping Richard pass his scholarship test for admission to Secondary School.) and led by Leo Lloyd, a steel worker and avid amateur thespian, who taught him the fundamentals of acting. Richard played the role of an escaped convict in Lloyd's play, The Bishop's Candlesticks, an adaptation of a section of Victor Hugo's Les Misérables. The play did not have any dialogue, but Alpert noted that Richard "mimed his role". Philip gave him a part in a radio documentary/adaptation of his play for BBC Radio, Youth at the Helm (1942). Seeing the talent Richard possessed, both Jones and Philip re-admitted him to school on 5 October 1942. (Note: Elfed was against Richard going back to school for they could not afford to send him. Richard retaliated by simply walking out of the house, saying he wasn't coming back. He stayed with Philip for a year from 1942 to 1943.) Philip tutored his charge intensely in school subjects and also worked at developing the youth's acting voice, including outdoor voice drills which improved his projection. Richard called the experience "the most hardworking and painful period" in his life. Philip called Richard "my son to all intents and purposes. I was committed to him", while Burton later wrote of Philip, "I owe him everything".

In March 1943, aged 17, Richard left his sister's home as a result of his brother-in-law's resentment at supporting his resumed education. He sought the help of Philip Burton, who arranged his transfer to the home of widow Elizabeth 'Ma' Smith where he himself lodged. By the autumn of that year Philip planned to adopt Richard but was not able to do so as he was 20 days too young to be 21 years older than his adoptee, a legal requirement. As a result, with consent of his father, Richard became Philip's legal ward and, just aged 18, changed his surname on 26 November 1943 to "Burton", after Philip's own surname, by means of deed poll. It was also in 1943 that Richard qualified for admission into a university after excelling in the School Certificate Examination. Philip requested Richard to study at Exeter College, Oxford, as a part of a six-month scholarship programme offered by the RAF for qualified cadets prior to active service.

== Career ==
=== 1943–1947: Early career and service in the RAF ===
In 1943, Burton played Professor Henry Higgins in a school production of another Shaw play directed by Philip, Pygmalion. The role won him favourable reviews and caught the attention of the dramatist, Emlyn Williams, who offered Burton a small role as the lead character's elder brother, Glan, in his play The Druid's Rest. The play debuted at the Royal Court Theatre, Liverpool on 22 November 1943, and later premiered in St Martin's Theatre, London in January 1944. Burton thought the role was "a nothing part" and that he "hardly spoke at all". He was paid ten pounds a week for playing the role (equivalent to £383 in 2025), which was "three times what the miners got". Alpert states that the play garnered mixed critical reviews, but James Redfern of the New Statesman took notice of Burton's performance and wrote: "In a wretched part, Richard Burton showed exceptional ability." Burton noted that single sentence from Redfern changed his life.

While an undergraduate at Exeter College, University of Oxford, Burton featured as "the complicated sex-driven puritan" Angelo in the Oxford University Dramatic Society's 1944 production of William Shakespeare's Measure for Measure. (Note: Originally, Burton was placed as an understudy for the part of Angelo after impressing Coghill by demonstrating and reciting the "To be, or not to be" soliloquy from William Shakespeare's Hamlet. The RAF officer who was to play the role of Angelo, was called back to active service and Burton was selected for the role. Philip sent letters of advice to Burton on how to play Angelo and came to London to oversee the rehearsals.) The play was directed by Burton's English literature professor, Nevill Coghill, and was performed at the college in the presence of additional contributors to West End theatre including John Gielgud, Terence Rattigan and Binkie Beaumont. On Burton's performance, fellow actor and friend, Robert Hardy recalled, "There were moments when he totally commanded the audience by this stillness. And the voice which would sing like a violin and with a bass that could shake the floor." Gielgud appreciated Burton's performance and Beaumont, who knew about Burton's work in The Druid's Rest, suggested that he "look him up" after completing his service in the RAF if he still wanted to pursue acting as a profession.

In late 1944, Burton successfully completed his six-month scholarship at Exeter College, Oxford, and went to the RAF classification examinations held in Torquay to train as a pilot. He was disqualified for pilot training because his eyesight was below par, and was classified as a navigator trainee. He had a short term posting for training at a temporary RCAF training base in Carberry, Manitoba. He served in the RAF for three years, during which time rather than flight crew he was assigned as an Aircraftman 1st Class to perform an administrative role in a Wiltshire-based RAF Hospital, RAF Wroughton. (Note: RAF Hospital Wroughton) Burton's habits of drinking and smoking increased during this period; he was involved in a brief casual affair with actress Eleanor Summerfield. (Note: Burton worked with Summerfield in two versions of Emlyn Williams' play, The Corn Is Green for BBC. The first one was a radio adaptation which was broadcast on 27 January 1945, while the other was a television adaptation by BBC Television that was premiered on 15 September 1946. Burton and Summerfield played the roles of Morgan Evans and Bessie Watty respectively in both the versions. According to biographer Alpert, Summerfield's parents didn't approve of Burton when he showed them a photo of himself and Summerfield at "a local pub". Philip too, didn't want Burton "encumbered with a wife while making his way in the theater [sic]".) Burton was cast in an uncredited and unnamed role of a bombing officer by BBC Third Programme in a 1946 radio adaptation of In Parenthesis, an epic poem of the First World War by David Jones. (Note: Burton lent his voice for a different role named Private Thomas in the 1948 radio production of In Parenthesis by Douglas Cleverdon.) Burton was discharged from the RAF on 16 December 1947.

=== 1948–1951: Rise through the ranks and film debut ===
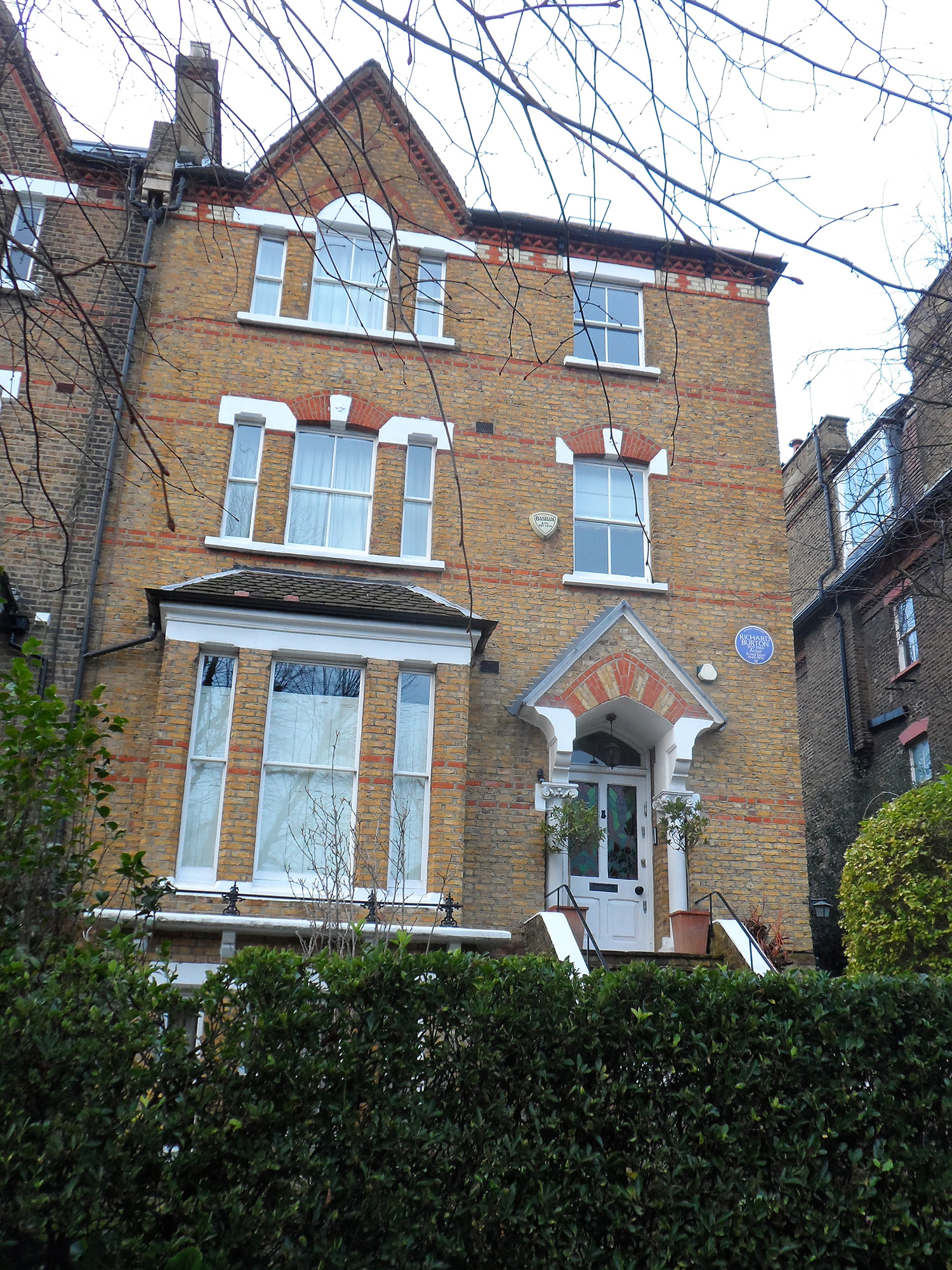
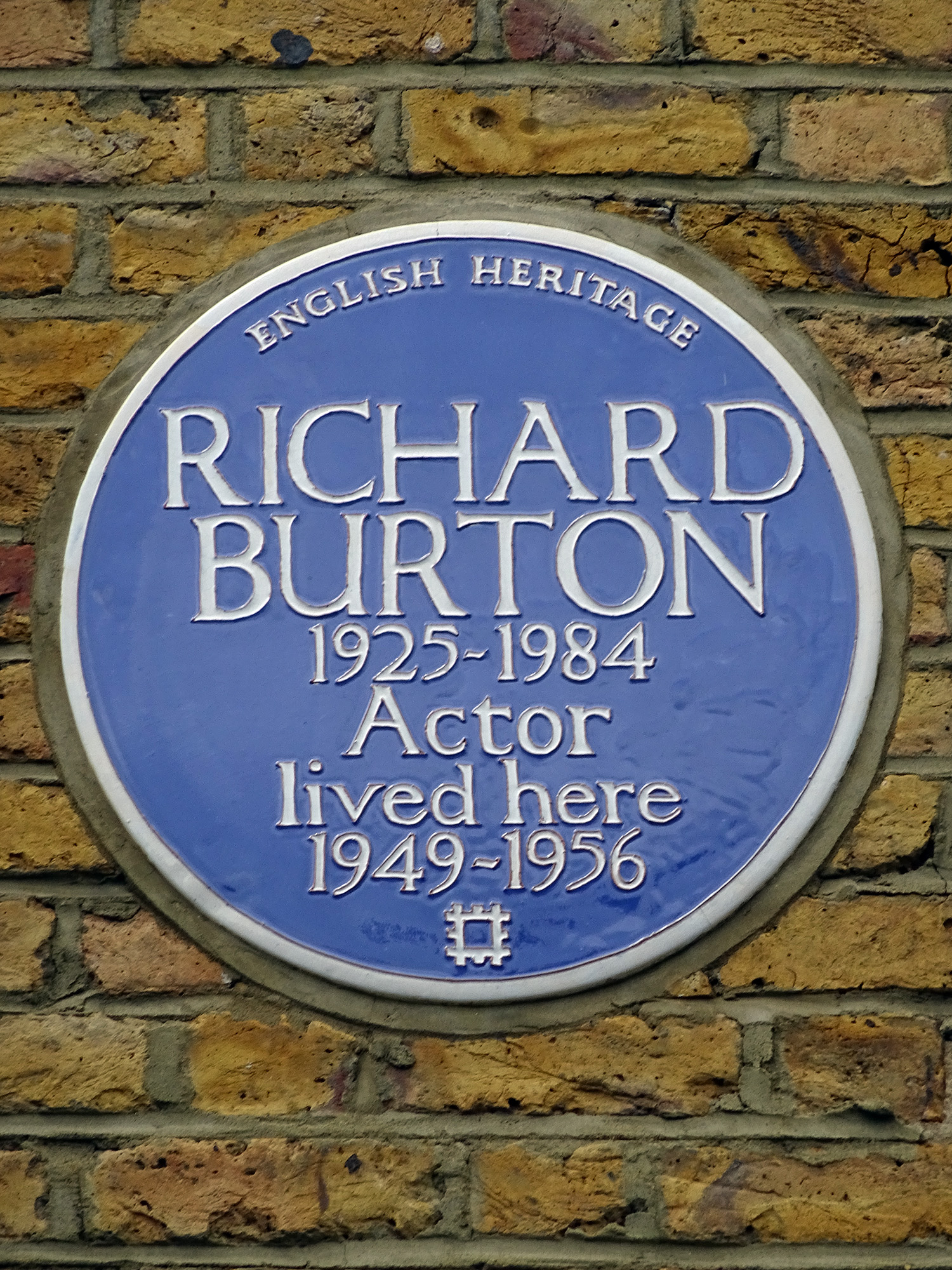
Burton's "rather nice two roomed flat in Hampstead" (left) was his from 1949 to 1956 at 6 Lyndhurst Road. An English Heritage blue plaque (enlarged here) is visible on the right just below the first floor.

In 1948, Burton moved to London to make contact with H. M. Tennent Ltd., where he again met Beaumont, who put him under a contract of £500 per year (£10 a week). Daphne Rye, the casting director for H. M. Tennent Ltd., offered Burton rooms on the top floor of her house in Pelham Crescent, London as a place for him to stay. Rye cast Burton in a minor role as a young officer, Mr. Hicks, in Castle Anna (1948), a drama set in Ireland.

While touring with the cast and crew members of Wynyard Browne's Dark Summer, Burton was called by Emlyn Williams for a screen test for his film, The Last Days of Dolwyn (1949). Burton performed the screen test for the role of Gareth, which Williams wrote especially for him, and was subsequently selected when Williams sent him a telegram that quoted a line from The Corn Is Green — "You have won the scholarship." This led to Burton making his mainstream film debut. Filming took place during the summer and early autumn months of 1948. It was on the sets of this film that Burton was introduced by Williams to Sybil Williams, whom he married on 5 February 1949 at a registry office in Kensington. The Last Days of Dolwyn opened to generally positive critical reviews. Burton was praised for his "acting fire, manly bearing and good looks" and film critic Philip French of The Guardian called it an "impressive movie debut". After marrying Sybil, Burton moved into a flat at 6 Lyndhurst Road, Hampstead NW3, where he lived from 1949 to 1956.

Pleased with the feedback Burton received for his performance in The Last Days of Dolwyn, the film's co-producer Alexander Korda offered him a contract at a stipend of £100 a week (equivalent to £3,055 in 2025), which he signed. The contract allowed Korda to lend Burton to films produced by other companies. Throughout the late 1940s and early 1950s, Burton acted in small parts in various British films such as Now Barabbas (1949) with Richard Greene and Kathleen Harrison, The Woman with No Name (1950) opposite Phyllis Calvert, and Waterfront (1950) with Harrison. Burton had a bigger part as Robert Hammond, a spy for a newspaper editor in Green Grow the Rushes (1951) alongside Honor Blackman. His performance in Now Barabbas received positive feedback from critics. C. A. Lejeune of The Observer believed Burton had "all the qualities of a leading man that the British film industry badly needs at this juncture: youth, good looks, a photogenic face, obviously alert intelligence and a trick of getting the maximum effort with the minimum of fuss." For The Woman With No Name, a critic from The New York Times thought Burton "merely adequate" in his role of the Norwegian aviator, Nick Chamerd. Biographer Bragg states the reviews for Burton's performance in Waterfront were "not bad", and that Green Grow the Rushes was a box office bomb.

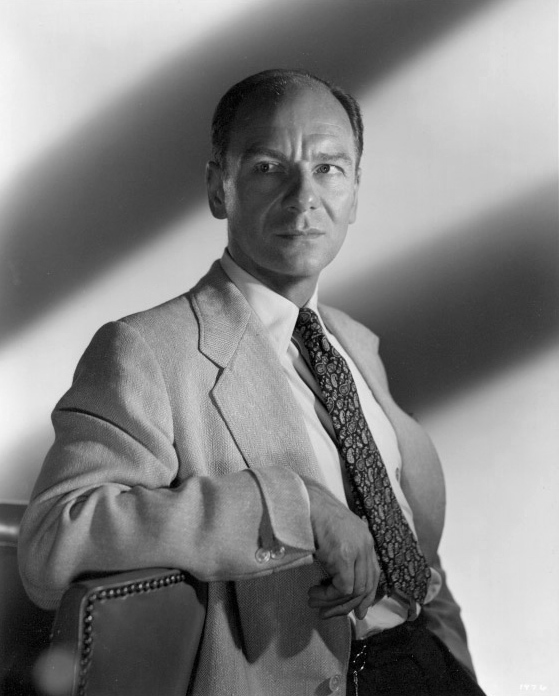
Gielgud (photographed 1953) gave Burton his career breakthrough, directing him in The Lady's Not For Burning, London and New York (1949).

Rye recommended Richard to director Peter Glenville for the part of Hephaestion in Rattigan's play about Alexander the Great, Adventure Story, in 1949. The play was directed by Glenville and starred the then up-and-coming actor Paul Scofield as the titular character. Glenville, however, rejected him as he felt that Burton was too short compared to Scofield. (Note: Glenville initially gave Burton the part after he successfully auditioned for the role alone on the stage. While rehearsing a scene with Scofield, Glenville found Burton to be "physically wrong", and claims that he did not reject him on the grounds of his talent.) Rye came to the rescue again by sending Burton to audition for a role in The Lady's Not for Burning, a play by Christopher Fry and directed by Gielgud. The lead roles were played by Gielgud himself, and Pamela Brown, while Burton played a supporting role as Richard alongside the then-relatively unknown actress Claire Bloom. Gielgud was initially uncertain about selecting Burton and asked him to come back the following day to repeat his audition. Burton got the part the second time he auditioned for the role. He was paid £15 a week for the part, which was five more than what Beaumont was paying him. (Note: Bragg writes that Fry himself intervened and persuaded Gielgud to cast Burton in the play. Gielgud stated that he did not properly remember how Burton was selected as he was "in a hurry" to complete the casting process. Gielgud found Burton "very striking to look at" and called him "a dream Prince".) After getting the part, he pushed for a raise in his salary from £10 to £30 a week with Williams' assistance, in addition to the £100 Korda paid him; Beaumont accepted it after much persuasion. Bloom was impressed with Burton's natural way of acting, noting that "he just was" and went further by saying "He was recognisably a star, a fact he didn't question."

He was marvellous at rehearsals. There was the true theatrical instinct. You only had to indicate—scarcely even that. He would get it and never changed it.

— Gielgud on Burton's acting.

The play opened at the Globe Theatre in May 1949 and had a successful run in London for a year. Writer and journalist Samantha Ellis of The Guardian, in her overview of the play, thought critics found Burton to be "most authentic" for his role. Gielgud took the play to Broadway in the United States, where it opened at the Royale Theatre on 8 November 1950. Theatre critic Brooks Atkinson appreciated the performances and praised the play's "hard glitter of wit and skepticism", while describing Fry as precocious with "a touch of genius". The play ran on Broadway until 17 March 1951, and received the New York Drama Critics' Circle award for the Best Foreign Play of 1951. Burton received the Theatre World Award for his performance, his first major award.

Burton went on to feature in two more plays by Fry – The Boy With A Cart and A Phoenix Too Frequent. The former opened at the Lyric Theatre, Hammersmith in February 1950, while the latter premiered at the Dolphin Theatre, Brighton the following month. Gielgud, who also directed The Boy With A Cart, said that Burton's role in the play "was one of the most beautiful performances" he had ever seen. During its month-long run, Anthony Quayle, who was looking for a young actor to star as Prince Hal in his adaptations of Henry IV, Part I and Henry IV, Part 2 as a part of the Shakespeare Memorial Theatre season for the Festival of Britain, came to see the play and as soon as he beheld Burton, he realised he had found his man and got his agreement to play the parts. Both plays opened in 1951 at the Shakespeare Memorial Theatre in Stratford-upon-Avon to mixed reviews, but Burton received acclaim for his role as Prince Hal, with many critics dubbing him "the next Laurence Olivier". Theatre critic Kenneth Tynan said of his performance, "His playing of Prince Hal turned interested speculation to awe almost as soon as he started to speak; in the first intermission local critics stood agape in the lobbies." He was also praised by Humphrey Bogart and his wife Lauren Bacall after both saw the play. Bacall later said of him: "He was just marvellous [...] Bogie loved him. We all did." Burton celebrated his success by buying his first car, a Standard Flying Fourteen, and enjoyed a drink with Bogart at a pub called The Dirty Duck. Philip too was happy with the progress his ward made, and felt "proud, humble, and awed by god's mysterious ways".

Burton went on to perform in Henry V as the titular character, and played Ferdinand in The Tempest as a part of the Shakespeare Memorial Theatre season as well. Neither role was overwhelmingly received by the critics, with a reviewer saying "he lacked inches" as Henry V. Olivier defended Burton by retaliating that he too received the same kind of review by the same critic for the same role. His last play in 1951 was as a musician named Orphée in Jean Anouilh's Eurydice opposite Dorothy McGuire and fellow Welsh actor Hugh Griffith. The play, retitled as Legend of Lovers, opened in the Plymouth Theatre, New York City and ran for only a week, but critics were kind to Burton, with Bob Francis of Billboard magazine finding him "excellent as the self-tortured young accordionist".

=== 1952–1954: Hollywood and The Old Vic ===
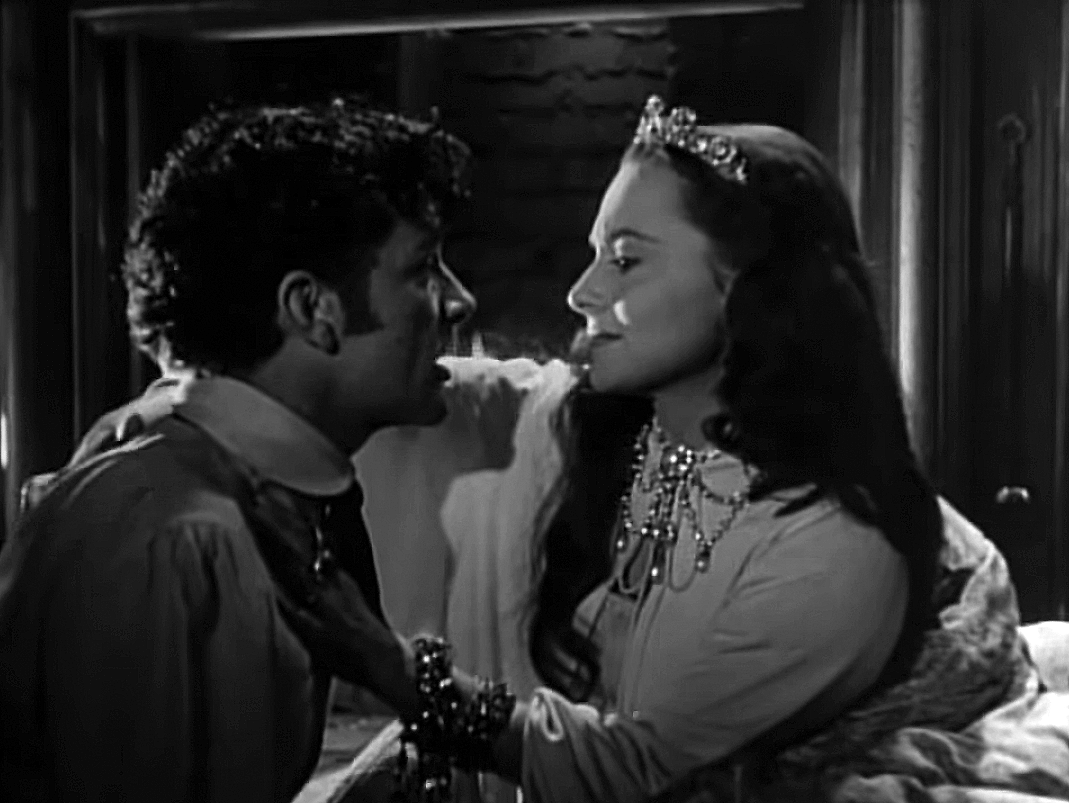
Burton with Olivia de Havilland in My Cousin Rachel (1952)

Burton began 1952 by starring alongside Noel Willman in the title role of Emmanuel Roblès adventure Montserrat, which opened on 8 April at the Lyric Hammersmith. The play only ran for six weeks but Burton once again won praise from critics. According to Bragg, some of the critics who watched the performance considered it to be Burton's "most convincing role" till then. Tynan lauded Burton's role of Captain Montserrat, noting that he played it "with a variousness which is amazing when you consider that it is really little more than a protracted exposition of smouldering dismay".

Burton successfully made the transition to Hollywood on the recommendation of film director George Cukor (Note: George Cukor was initially assigned by the film's producer and screenwriter Nunnally Johnson to direct My Cousin Rachel, but left due to differences of opinion with Johnson regarding the film's script. Henry Koster was assigned in his place.) when he was given the lead role in the Gothic romance film, My Cousin Rachel (1952) opposite Olivia de Havilland. Darryl F. Zanuck, co-founder of 20th Century Fox, negotiated a deal with Korda to lend Burton to the company for three films as well as pay Burton a total of $150,000 ($50,000 per film). De Havilland did not get along well with Burton during filming, calling him "a coarse-grained man with a coarse-grained charm and a talent not completely developed, and a coarse-grained behavior [sic] which makes him not like anyone else". One of Burton's friends opined it may have been because of Burton's making remarks to her that she did not find in good taste. (Note: Biographer Alpert mentions that De Havilland complemented Burton as well, mentioning he possessed a "manliness combined with a little boy quality".)

Based on the 1951 novel of the same name by Daphne du Maurier, My Cousin Rachel is about a man who suspects his rich cousin was murdered by his wife in order to inherit his wealth, but ends up falling in love with her, despite his suspicions. Upon release, the film was successful at the box office, and Burton's performance received mostly excellent reviews. Bosley Crowther, writing for The New York Times, appreciated Burton's emotional performance, describing it as "most fetching"; he called him "the perfect hero of Miss du Maurier's tale". The Los Angeles Daily News reviewer stated "young Burton registers with an intense performance that stamps him as an actor of great potential". Conversely, a critic from the Los Angeles Examiner labelled Burton as "terribly, terribly tweedy". The film earned Burton the Golden Globe Award for New Star of the Year – Actor and his first Academy Award nomination in the Best Supporting Actor category.

While shooting My Cousin Rachel, Burton was offered the role of Mark Antony in Julius Caesar (1953) by the production company, Metro Goldwyn Mayer (MGM), but Burton refused it to avoid schedule conflicts. The role subsequently went to Marlon Brando for which he earned a BAFTA Award for Best Foreign Actor and an Academy Award nomination for Best Actor.

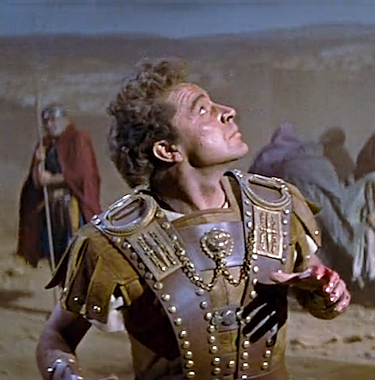
As the Roman military tribune Marcellus Gallio in The Robe (1953)

The year 1953 marked an important turning point in Burton's career. He arrived in Hollywood at a time when the studio system was struggling. The rise of television was drawing viewers away and the studios looked to new stars and film technologies to tempt viewers back to cinemas. He first appeared in the war film The Desert Rats with James Mason, playing an English captain in the North African campaign during World War II who takes charge of a hopelessly outnumbered Australian unit against the indomitable German field marshal, Erwin Rommel, who was portrayed by Mason. The film received generally good reviews from critics in London, although they complained the British contribution to the campaign had been underplayed. The critic from Variety magazine thought Burton was "excellent" while The New York Times reviewer noted his "electric portrayal of the hero" made the film look "more than a plain, cavalier apology". Burton and Sybil became good friends with Mason and his wife Pamela Mason, and stayed at their residence until Burton returned home to the UK in June 1953 in order to play Prince Hamlet as a part of The Old Vic 1953–54 season. This was to be the first time in his career he took up the role.

Burton's second and final film of the year was in the Biblical epic historical drama, The Robe, notable for being the first-ever motion picture to be made in CinemaScope. (Note: The decision to make the film in CinemaScope was taken by Fox as a response to Cinerama, another widescreen process that was introduced in 1952 with the film, This Is Cinerama.) He replaced Tyrone Power, who was originally cast in the role of Marcellus Gallio, a noble but decadent Roman military tribune in command of the detachment of Roman soldiers that were involved in crucifying Jesus Christ. Haunted by nightmares of the crucifixion, he is eventually led to his own conversion. Marcellus' Greek slave Demetrius (played by Victor Mature) guides him as a spiritual teacher, and his wife Diana (played by Jean Simmons) follows his lead. The film established a trend for Biblical epics such as Ben-Hur (1959). Based on Lloyd C. Douglas' 1942 historical novel of the same name, The Robe was well received at the time of its release, but contemporary reviews have been less favourable. Variety magazine termed the performances of the lead cast "effective" and complemented the fight sequences between Burton and Jeff Morrow. Crowther believed that Burton was "stalwart, spirited and stern" as Marcellus. Jonathan Rosenbaum of the Chicago Reader called The Robe "pious claptrap". The film was a commercial success, grossing $17 million against a $5 million budget, and Burton received his second Academy Award nomination, his first for Best Actor, for the 26th Academy Awards.

Bolstered by The Robe's box office collections, Zanuck offered Burton a seven-year, seven-picture $1 million contract (equivalent to $12,124,060 in 2025), but he politely turned it down as he was planning to head home to portray Hamlet at The Old Vic. Zanuck threatened to force Burton into cutting the deal, but the duo managed to come to a compromise when Burton agreed to a less binding contract, also for seven years and seven films at $1 million, that would begin only after he returned from his stint at The Old Vic's 1953–54 season. (Note: Alpert mentions the contract's span as ten-year and ten-pictures, but also states the amount to be $1 million.) News of the incident soon spread and his decision to walk out on a million-dollar contract for a stipend of £150 a week at The Old Vic was met with both appreciation and surprise. Bragg believed Burton defied the studio system with this act when that would have been expected to guarantee unemployment for him. Gossip columnist Hedda Hopper considered Burton's success in his first three films in Hollywood to be "the most exciting success story since Gregory Peck's contracts of ten years back".

[Elizabeth Taylor] was so extraordinarily beautiful that I nearly laughed out loud [...] She was undeniably gorgeous [...] She was lavish. She was a dark unyielding largesse. She was, in short, too bloody much, and not only that, she was totally ignoring me.

— Burton's first impression of Elizabeth Taylor.

At a party held at Simmons' residence in Bel Air, Los Angeles to celebrate the success of The Robe, Burton met Elizabeth Taylor for the first time. Taylor, who at the time was married to actor Michael Wilding and was pregnant with their first child, recalled her first impression of Burton being "rather full of himself. I seem to remember that he never stopped talking, and I had given him the cold fish eye." Hamlet was a challenge that both terrified and attracted him, as it was a role many of his peers in the British theatre had undertaken, including Gielgud and Olivier. He shared his anxiety with de Havilland while coming to terms with her. Bogart too, didn't make it easy for him when he retorted: "I never knew a man who played Hamlet who didn't die broke."

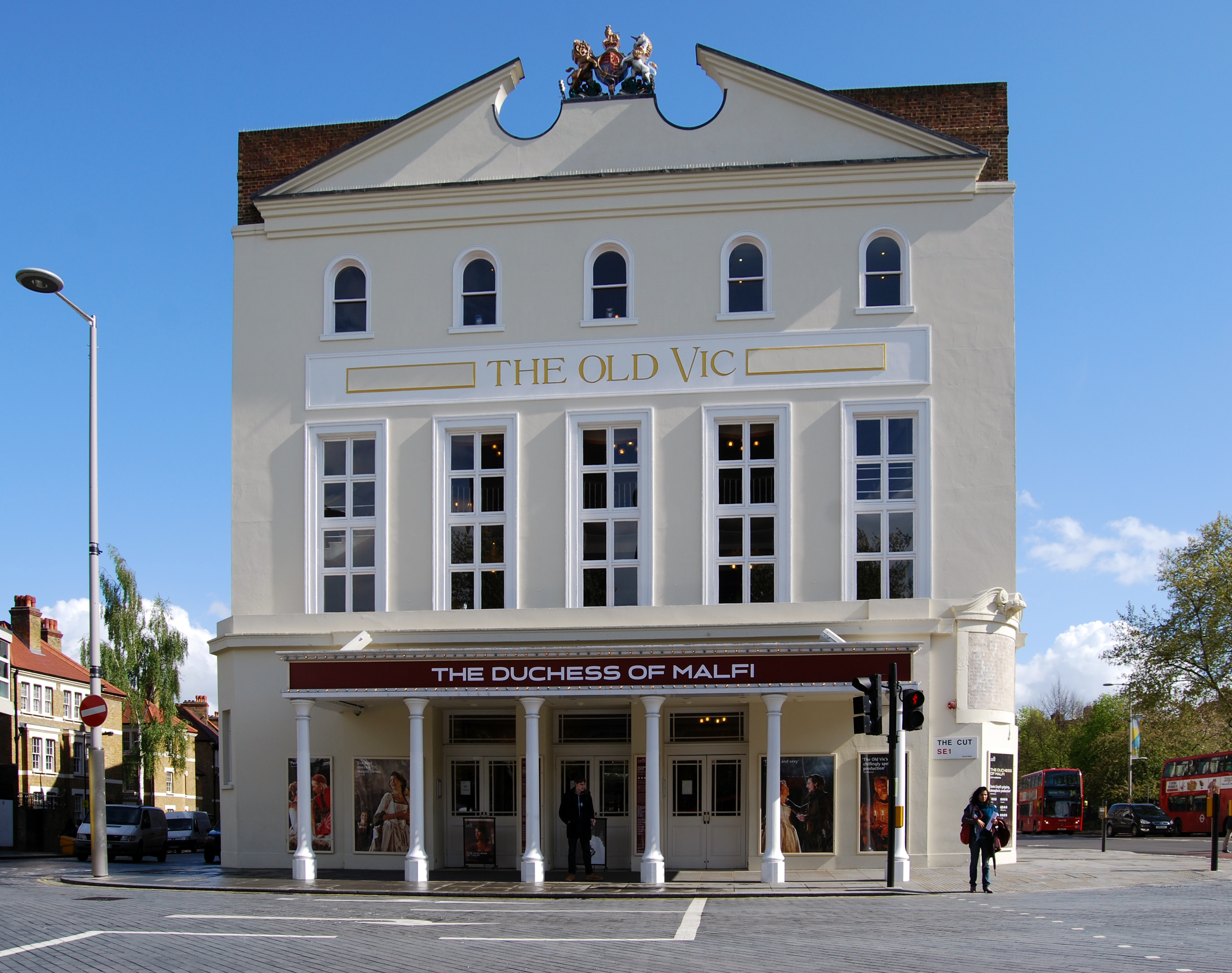
The Old Vic (photographed in 2012) in London, where Burton rose to fame as a Shakespearean actor

Notwithstanding, Burton began his thirty-nine-week stint at The Old Vic by rehearsing for Hamlet in July 1953, with Philip providing expert coaching on how to make Hamlet's character match Burton's dynamic acting style. Burton reunited with Bloom, who played Ophelia. Hamlet opened at the Assembly Hall in Edinburgh, Scotland in September 1953 as part of The Old Vic season during the Edinburgh Festival Fringe. The play and Burton's Hamlet were, on the whole, well received, with critics describing his interpretation of the character as "moody, virile and baleful" and that he had "dash, attack and verve". Burton's Hamlet was quite popular with the young audience, who came to watch the play in numbers as they were quite taken with the aggressiveness with which he portrayed the role. Burton also received appreciation from Winston Churchill. Gielgud was not too happy with Burton's Hamlet and asked him while both were backstage: "Shall I go ahead and wait until you're better?... ah, I mean ready?" Burton picked up the hint and infused some of Gielgud's traits to his own in later performances as Hamlet. (Note: Gielgud's biographer Jonathan Croall opines Gielgud's dissatisfaction may be due to a remark Burton made that his portrayal of Hamlet was "a sort of unconscious imitation of Gielgud".) A greater success followed in the form of the Roman General Gaius Marcius Coriolanus in Coriolanus. At first, Burton refused to play Coriolanus as he didn't like the character's initial disdain for the poor and the downtrodden. Michael Benthall, who was renowned for his association with Tyrone Guthrie in a 1944 production of Hamlet, sought Philip's help to entice Burton into accepting it. Philip convinced Burton by making him realise that it was Coriolanus' "lack of ambivalence" which made him an admirable character. Burton received even better reviews for Coriolanus than Hamlet. Hardy thought Burton's Hamlet was "too strong" but that "His Coriolanus is quite easily the best I've ever seen." Olivier too agreed it was the greatest Coriolanus he had ever seen till then.

Burton's other roles for the season were Sir Toby Belch in Twelfth Night, Caliban in The Tempest and Philip of Cognac in King John. All five of Burton's plays were directed by Benthall; three of those plays featured Bloom. While Belch was considered "disappointing", owing to Burton's not putting on the proper make-up for the part, his reviews for Caliban and Philip of Cognac were positive. Alpert believed Burton's presence made the 1953–54 season of The Old Vic a commercial success. Burton was an ardent admirer of poet Dylan Thomas since his boyhood days. On the poet's death on 9 November 1953, he wrote an essay about him and took the time to make a 1954 BBC Radio adaptation of one of his final works, Under Milk Wood, in which Burton performed the role of First Voice in an all-Welsh cast. The entire cast of the radio adaptation, including Burton, played their roles free of charge. Burton reprised his role in the play's 1972 film adaptation with Taylor. Burton was also involved in narrating Lindsay Anderson's short documentary film about The Royal School for the Deaf in Margate, Thursday's Children (1954).

=== 1955–1959: Setback in films and on-stage fame ===
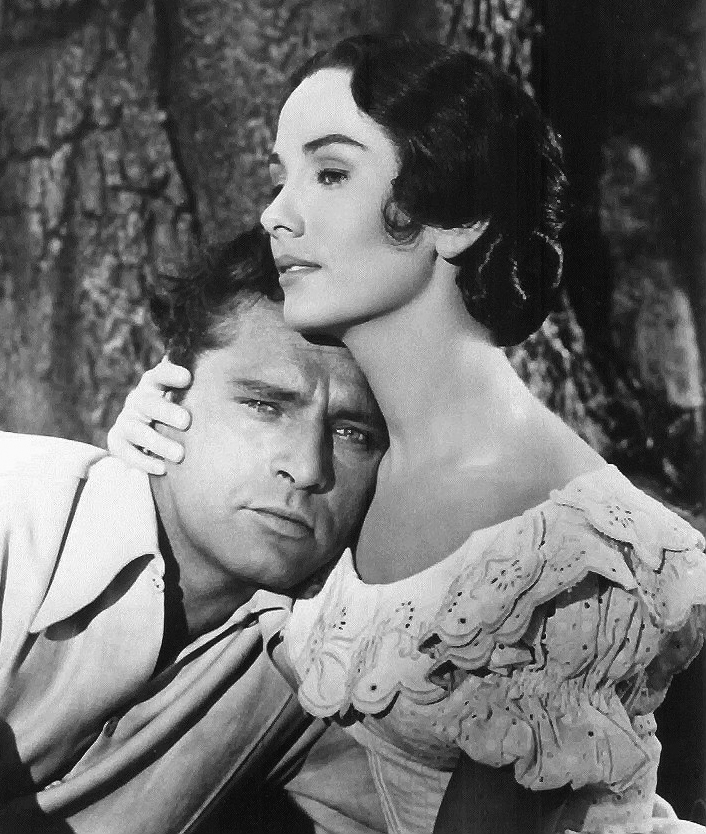
With Maggie McNamara in Prince of Players (1955)

After The Old Vic season ended, Burton's contract with Fox required him to do three more films. The first was Prince of Players (1955), where he was cast as the 19th-century Shakespearean actor Edwin Booth, who was John Wilkes Booth's brother. Maggie McNamara played Edwin's wife, Mary Devlin Booth. Philip thought the script was "a disgrace" to Burton's name. The film's director Philip Dunne observed, "He hadn't mastered yet the tricks of the great movie stars, such as Gary Cooper, who knew them all. The personal magnetism Richard had on the sound stage didn't come through the camera." This was one aspect that troubled Richard throughout his career on celluloid. The film flopped at the box office and has since been described as "the first flop in CinemaScope". Crowther, however, lauded Burton's scenes where he performed Shakespeare plays such as Richard III.

Shortly after the release of Prince of Players, Burton met director Robert Rossen, who was well known at the time for his Academy Award-winning film, All the King's Men (1949). Rossen planned to cast Burton in Alexander the Great (1956) as the eponymous character. Burton accepted Rossen's offer after the director reassured him he had been studying the Macedonian king for two years to make sure the film was historically accurate. Burton was loaned by Fox to the film's production company United Artists, which paid him a fee of $100,000 (equivalent to $1,184,211 in 2025). Alexander the Great was made mostly in Spain during February 1955 and July 1955 on a budget of $6 million. The film reunited Burton with Bloom and it was also the first film he made with her. Bloom played the role of Barsine, the daughter of Artabazos II of Phrygia, and one of Alexander's three wives. Fredric March, Danielle Darrieux, Stanley Baker, Michael Hordern and William Squire were respectively cast as Philip II of Macedon, Olympias, Attalus, Demosthenes and Aeschines.

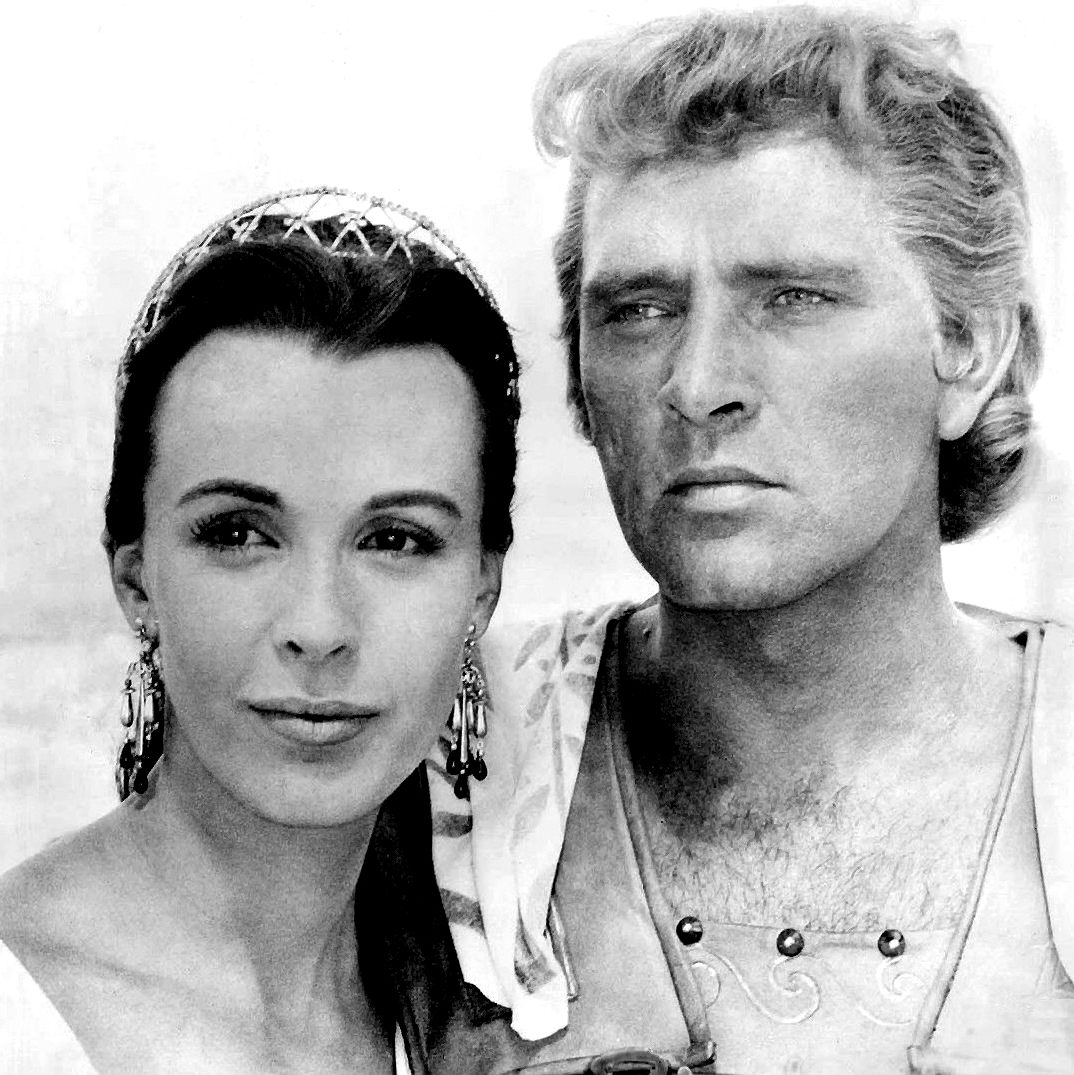
With Claire Bloom in Alexander the Great (1956)

After the completion of Alexander the Great, Burton had high hopes for a favourable reception of the "intelligent epic", and went back to complete his next assignment for Fox, Jean Negulesco's The Rains of Ranchipur (1955). In this remake of Fox's own 1939 film The Rains Came, Burton played a Hindu doctor, Rama Safti, who falls in love with Lady Edwina Esketh (Lana Turner), an invitee of the Maharani of the fictional town of Ranchipur. Burton faced the same troubles with playing character roles as before with Belch. The Rains of Ranchipur released on 16 December 1955, three months before Alexander the Great rolled out on 28 March 1956. Contrary to Burton's expectations, both the films were critical and commercial failures, and he rued his decision to act in them. Time magazine critic derided The Rains of Ranchipur and even went as far as to say Richard was hardly noticeable in the film. A. H. Weiler of The New York Times, however, called Burton's rendering of Alexander "serious and impassioned".

Burton returned to The Old Vic to perform Henry V for a second time. The Benthall-directed production opened in December 1955 to glowing reviews and was a much-needed triumph for Burton. Tynan made it official by famously saying Burton was now "the next successor to Olivier". The reviewer from The Times began by pointing out the deficiencies in Burton's previous rendition of the character in 1951 before stating "Mr. Burton's progress as an actor is such that already he is able to make good all the lacks of a few short years ago ... what was greatly metallic has been transformed into a steely strength which becomes the martial ring and hard brilliance of the patriotic verse. There now appears a romantic sense of a high kingly mission and the clear cognisance of the capacity to fulfil it ... the whole performance — a mostly satisfying one — is firmly under the control of the imagination".

In January 1956, the London Evening Standard honoured Burton by presenting to him its Theatre Award for Best Actor for his portrayal of Henry V. His success in and as Henry V led him to be called the "Welsh Wizard". Henry V was followed by Benthall's adaptation of Othello in February 1956, where he alternated on successive openings between the roles of Othello and Iago with John Neville. As Othello, Burton received both praise for his dynamism and criticism with being less poetical with his dialogues, while he was acclaimed as Iago.

Burton's stay at The Old Vic was cut short when he was approached by the Italian neorealist director Roberto Rossellini for Fox's Sea Wife (1957), a drama set in World War II about a nun and three men marooned on an island after the ship they travel on is torpedoed by a U-boat. Joan Collins, who played the nun, was his co-star. Burton's role was that of an RAF officer who develops romantic feelings for the nun. Rossellini was informed by Zanuck not to have any kissing scenes between Burton and Collins, which Rossellini found unnatural; this led to him walking out of the film and being replaced by Bob McNaught, one of the executive producers. According to Collins, Burton had a "take-the-money-and-run attitude" toward the film. Sea Wife was not a successful venture, with biographer Munn observing that his salary was the only positive feature that came from the film. Philip saw it and said he was "ashamed" that it added another insult to injury in Burton's career.

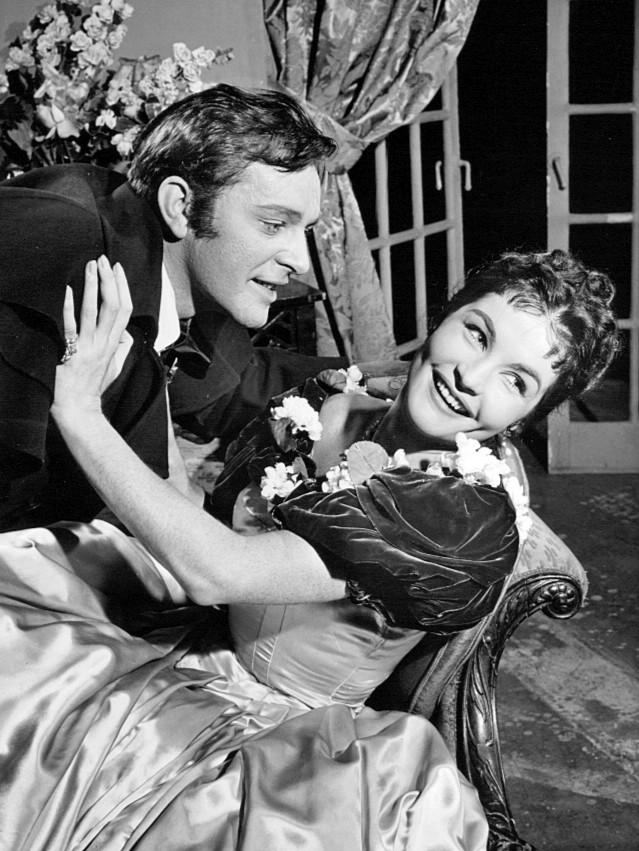
With Yvonne Furneaux in Wuthering Heights (1958)

After Sea Wife, Burton next appeared as the British Army Captain Jim Leith in Nicholas Ray's Bitter Victory (1957). Burton admired Ray's Rebel Without A Cause (1955) and was excited about working with him, but unfortunately despite positive feedback, Bitter Victory tanked as well. By mid-1957, Burton had no further offers in his kitty. He could not return to the UK because of his self-imposed exile from taxation, and his fortunes in film were dwindling. It was then that film producer and screenwriter Milton Sperling offered Burton to star alongside Helen Hayes and Susan Strasberg in Patricia Moyes' adaptation of Jean Anouilh's play, Time Remembered (Léocadia in the original French version). Sensing an opportunity for a career resurgence, Burton readily agreed to do the role of Prince Albert, who falls in love with a milliner named Amanda (Strasberg). It was on 10 September 1957, a day before he left for New York, that Sybil gave birth to their first child, Kate Burton. Time Remembered was well received on its opening nights at Broadway's Morosco Theatre and also at the National Theatre in Washington, D.C. The play went on to have a good run of 248 performances for six months. Burton received his first Tony Award for Best Actor in a Play nomination while Hayes won her second Tony Award for Best Actress in a Play for her role as Burton's mother, The Duchess of Pont-Au-Bronc.

In 1958, Burton appeared with Yvonne Furneaux in DuPont Show of the Month's 90-minute television adaptation of Emily Brontë's classic novel Wuthering Heights as Heathcliff. The film, directed by Daniel Petrie, aired on 9 May 1958 on CBS with Burton garnering plaudits from both the critics and Philip, who thought he was "magnificent" in it. Burton next featured as Jimmy Porter, "an angry young man" role, in the film version of John Osborne's play Look Back in Anger (1959), a gritty drama about middle-class life in the British Midlands, directed by Tony Richardson, again with Claire Bloom as co-star. Biographer Bragg observed that Look Back in Anger "had defined a generation, provided a watershed in Britain's view of itself and brought [Osborne] into the public prints as a controversial, dangerous figure". Burton was able to identify himself with Porter, finding it "fascinating to find a man who came presumably from my sort of class, who actually could talk the way I would like to talk". The film, and Burton's performance, received mixed reviews upon release. Biographer Alpert noted that though reviews in the UK were favourable, those in the United States were more negative. Crowther wrote of Burton: "His tirades are eloquent but tiring, his breast beatings are dramatic but dull and his occasional lapses into sadness are pathetic but endurable." Geoff Andrew of Time Out magazine felt Burton was too old for the part, and the Variety reviewer thought "the role gives him little opportunity for variety".

Contemporary reviews of the film have been better and it has a rating of 89% on the review aggregator website Rotten Tomatoes. Look Back in Anger is now considered one of the defining films of the British New Wave cinema, a movement from the late 1950s to the late 1960s in which working-class characters became the focus of the film and conflict of social classes a central theme. Jimmy Porter is also considered one of Burton's best on-screen roles; he was nominated in the Best Actor categories at the BAFTA and Golden Globe Awards but lost to Peter Sellers for I'm All Right Jack (1959) and Anthony Franciosa for Career (1959) respectively. Though it didn't do well commercially, Burton was proud of the effort and wrote to Philip, "I promise you that there isn't a shred of self-pity in my performance. I am for the first time ever looking forward to seeing a film in which I play." While filming Look Back in Anger, Burton did another play for BBC Radio, participating in two versions, one in Welsh and another in English, of Welsh poet Saunders Lewis' Brad, which was about the 20 July plot. Burton voiced one of the conspirators, Caesar von Hofacker.

=== 1960–1969: Broadway, Hamlet and films with Elizabeth Taylor ===
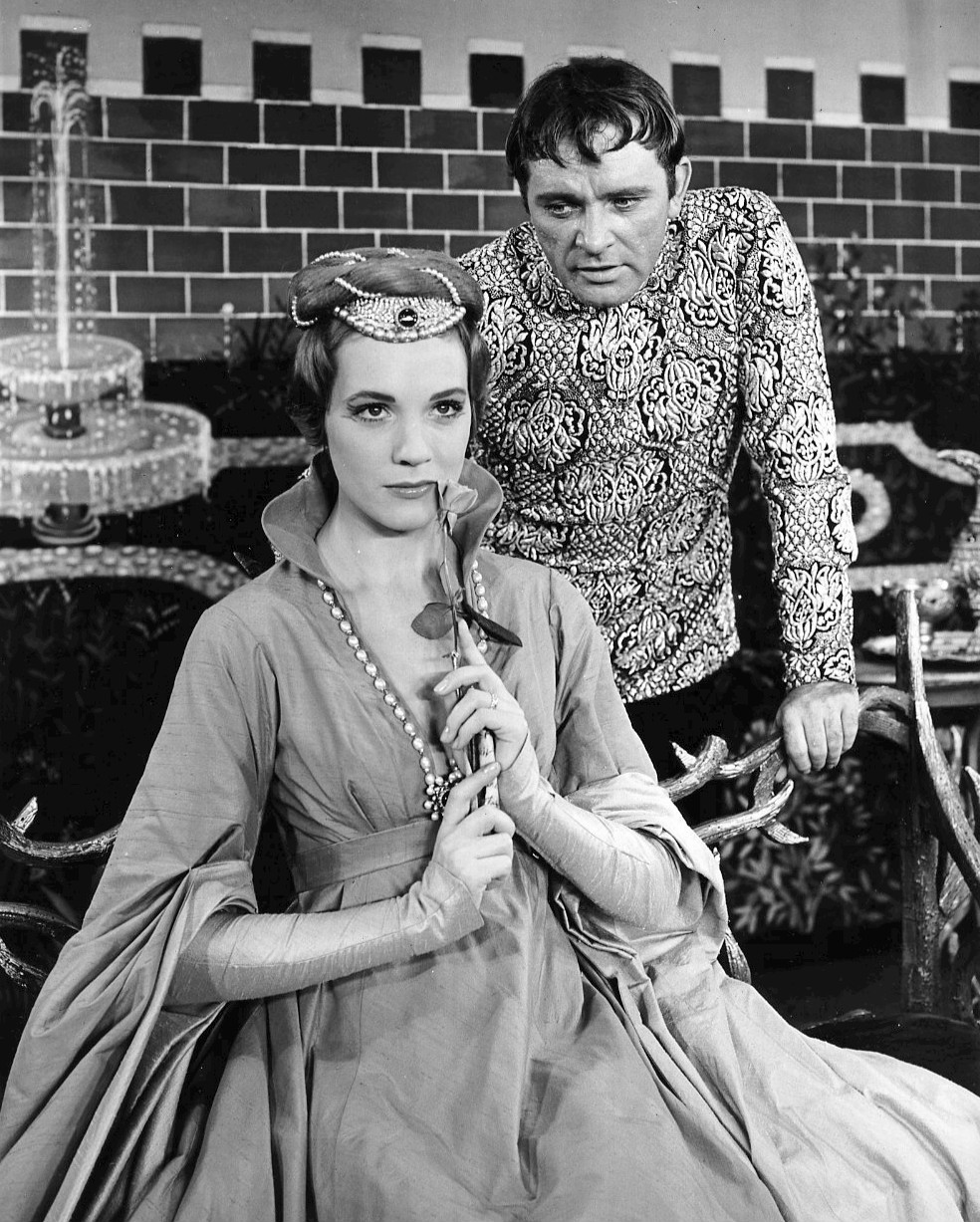
Burton and Julie Andrews in the original Broadway production of Camelot

In 1960, Burton appeared in two films for Warner Bros., neither of which were successful: The Bramble Bush which reunited him with his Wuthering Heights director Petrie, and Vincent Sherman's adaptation of Edna Ferber's Ice Palace. Burton called the latter a "piece of shit". He received a fee of $125,000 for both films. Burton's next appearance was as the stammering secularist, George Holyoake in BBC's documentary-style television adaptation of John Osborne's A Subject of Scandal and Concern. According to Osborne's biographer Luc Gilleman, the film garnered little attention. Burton returned to the United States for the filming of John Frankenheimer's television adaptation of Ernest Hemingway's The Fifth Column. He also provided narration for 26 episodes of The Valiant Years, an American Broadcasting Company (ABC) series based on Winston Churchill's memoirs.

Burton made a triumphant return to the stage with Moss Hart's 1960 Broadway production of Camelot as King Arthur. The play, written by Alan Jay Lerner and Frederick Loewe, had Julie Andrews fresh from her triumph in My Fair Lady playing Guinevere, and Robert Goulet as Lancelot completing the love triangle. Roddy McDowall played the villainous Mordred. Hart first came up with the proposal to Burton after learning from Lerner about his ability to sing. Burton consulted Olivier on whether he should take the role, which came with a stipend of $4,000 a week. Olivier pointed out this salary was good and that he should accept the offer. The production was troubled, with both Loewe and Hart falling ill and the pressure was building, owing to great expectations and huge advance sales. The show's running time was nearly five hours. Burton's intense preparation and competitive desire to succeed served him well. He immediately drafted Philip, who revised the musical's script and cut its running time to three hours while also incorporating three new songs. Burton was generous and supportive to everyone throughout the production and coached the understudies himself. According to Lerner, "he kept the boat from rocking, and Camelot might never have reached New York if it hadn't been for him". Burton's reviews were excellent, with the critic from Time magazine observing that Richard "gives Arthur the skillful and vastly appealing performance that might be expected from one of England's finest young actors". Broadway theatre reviewer Walter Kerr noted Richard's syllables, "sing, the account of his wrestling the stone from the sword becomes a bravura passage of house-hushing brilliance" and complemented his duets with Andrews, finding Burton's rendition to possess "a sly and fretful and mocking accent to take care of the humor [sic] without destroying the man".

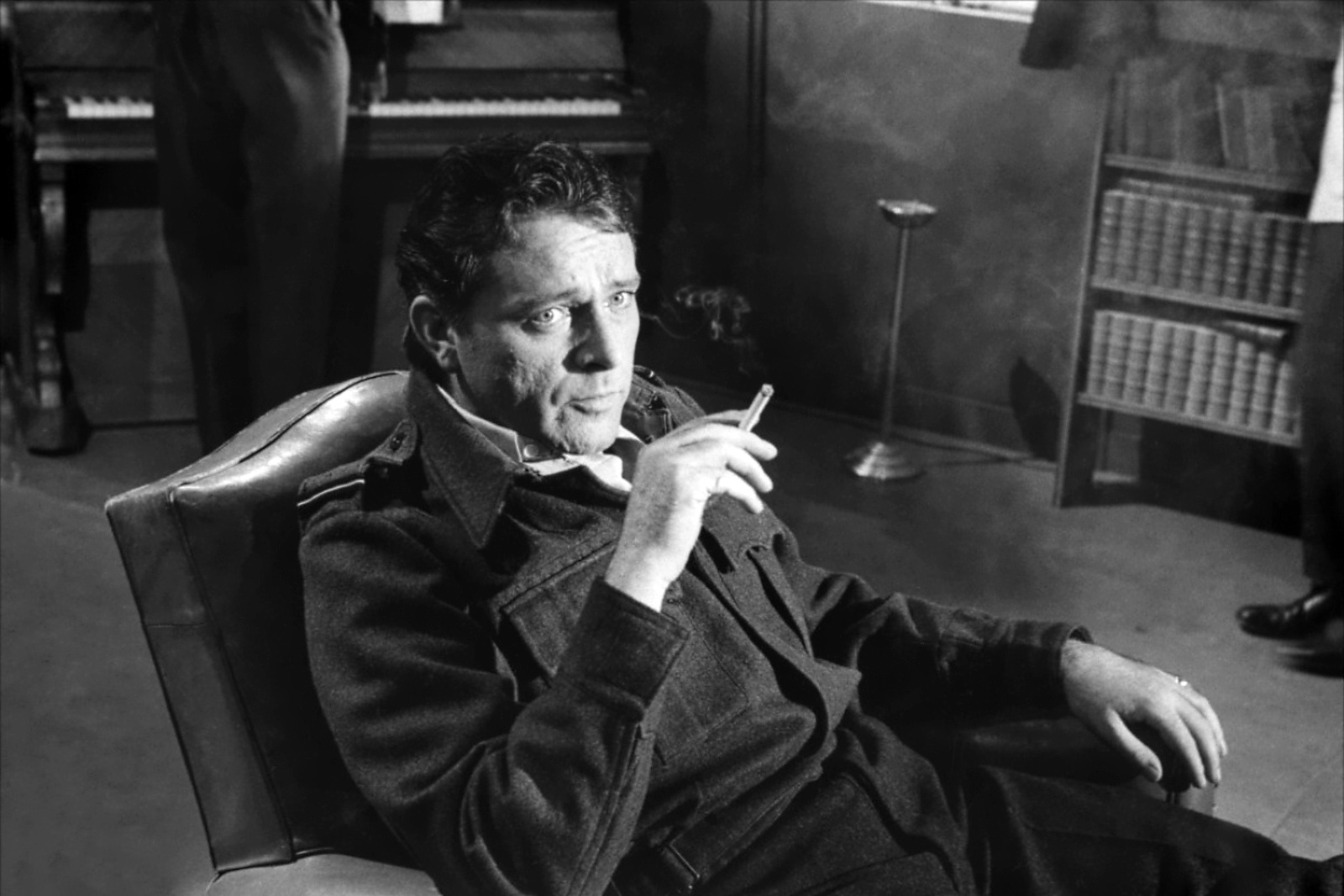
In The Longest Day (1962)

However, on the whole, the play initially received mixed reviews on its opening at the Majestic Theatre on Broadway and was slow to earn money. Advance sales managed to keep Camelot running for three months until a twenty-minute extract was broadcast on The Ed Sullivan Show (Note: Sullivan wanted an interview with Lerner and Loewe, promising to devote the time entirely to Camelot to which they agreed.) which helped Camelot achieve great success, and an unprecedented three-year run overall from 1960 to 1963. Its success led to Burton being called "The King of Broadway", and he went on to receive the Tony Award for Best Actor in a Musical. The original soundtrack of the musical topped the Billboard charts throughout 1961 after its release at the end of 1960. John F. Kennedy, who was then the President of the United States, reportedly enjoyed the play and invited Burton to the White House for a visit. In 1962, Burton appeared as Flying Officer David Campbell, an RAF fighter pilot in The Longest Day, which included a large ensemble cast featuring: McDowall, George Segal, Henry Fonda, John Wayne, Mel Ferrer, Robert Mitchum, Rod Steiger and Sean Connery. The same year he provided narration for the Jack Howells documentary Dylan Thomas. The short won the Best Documentary Short Subject at the 35th Academy Awards ceremony.

After performing Camelot for six months, in July 1961, Burton met producer Walter Wanger who asked him to replace Stephen Boyd as Mark Antony in director Joseph L. Mankiewicz's magnum opus Cleopatra. Burton was paid $250,000 for four months work in the film (equivalent to $2,629,076 in 2025). The gigantic scale of the film's troubled production, Taylor's bouts of illness and fluctuating weight, Burton's off-screen relationship with the actress, (which he gave the sardonic nickname "Le Scandale") all generated enormous publicity; (Note: The film was initially slated to be helmed by Armenian American film director Rouben Mamoulian. Principal photography began in London in 1960 but had to be halted several times due to prevalent weather conditions. Elizabeth Taylor's inability to adapt to the English climate resulted in her falling continuously ill, further delaying production. In March 1961, she contracted a near-fatal case of pneumonia, which required a tracheotomy to be performed. After she recovered, Fox shifted the production to Rome. Mamoulian was fired and Joseph L. Mankiewicz was hired at Taylor's insistence. Stephen Boyd and Peter Finch, who played Mark Antony and Julius Caesar respectively, withdrew to concentrate on other pending projects. The duo were replaced by Burton and Rex Harrison. Filming was finally completed in July 1962.) Life magazine proclaimed it the "Most Talked About Movie Ever Made". Fox's future appeared to hinge on what became the most expensive movie ever made until then, with costs reaching almost $40 million. During filming, Burton met and fell in love with Elizabeth Taylor, who was then married to Eddie Fisher. According to Alpert, at their first meeting on the set while posing for their publicity photographs, Burton said, "Has anyone ever told you that you're a very pretty girl?" Taylor later recalled, "I said to myself, Oy gevalt, here's the great lover, the great wit, the great intellectual of Wales, and he comes out with a line like that." Bragg contradicts Alpert by pointing out that Burton could not stand Taylor at first, calling her "Miss Tits" and opined to Mankiewicz, "I expect she shaves"; he saw her simply as another celebrity with no acting talent. All that changed when, in their first scene together, Burton was shaky and forgot his lines, and she soothed and helped him; it was at this instance, according to Taylor, that she fell for him. Soon the affair began in earnest; both Fisher and Sybil were unable to bear it. While Fisher fled the sets for Gstaad, Sybil went first to Céligny and then headed off to London. Olivier, shocked by Burton's affair with Taylor, cabled him: "Make up your mind, dear heart. Do you want to be a great actor or a household word?". Burton replied "Both".

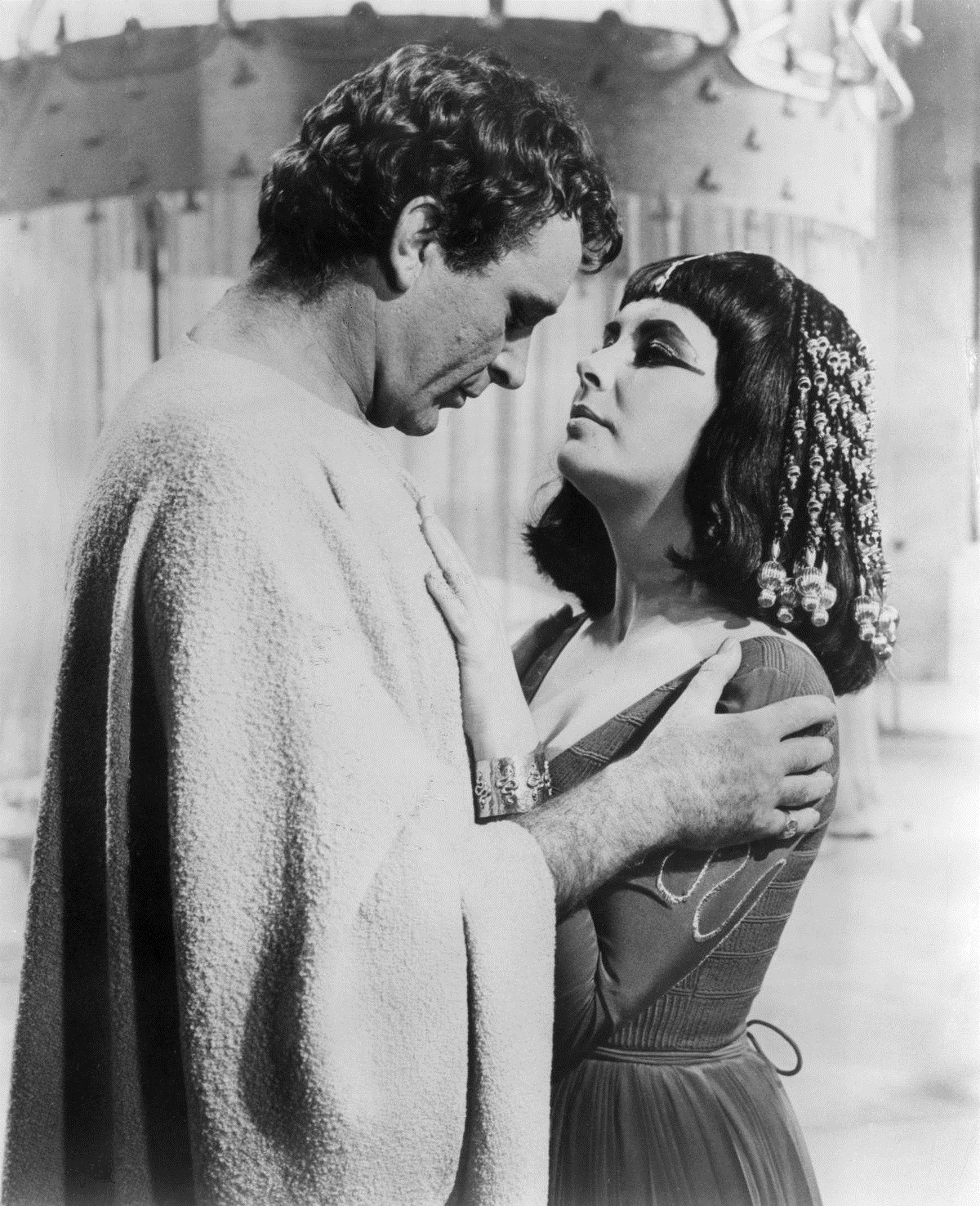
As Mark Antony in Cleopatra (1963), with Elizabeth Taylor as the titular character

Cleopatra was finally released on 11 June 1963 with a run time of 243 minutes, to polarising reviews. (Note: The film was initially six hours long and Mankiewicz thought of releasing the film in two parts, both three hours long. Zanuck rejected the idea and edited the film himself by cutting it down to four hours. Alpert observed that the more Zanuck edited the film, the less Burton's screen presence became. Burton and Taylor supported Mankiewicz, with the former saying the director "might have made the first really good epic film". Mankiewicz said of the editing of Burton's scenes, "He gave a brilliant performance, much of which will never be seen.") The Time magazine critic found the film "riddled with flaws, [lacking] style both in image and in action", and wrote Burton "staggers around looking ghastly and spouting irrelevance". In a contradictory review, Crowther termed the film "generally brilliant, moving, and satisfying" and thought Burton was "exciting as the arrogant Antony". Richard Brody of The New Yorker commented positively on the chemistry between Burton and Taylor, describing it as "entrancing in the movie's drama as it was in life". Cleopatra grossed over $26 million (equivalent to $273,423,913 in 2025), becoming one of the highest-grossing films of 1963. It was not enough to prevent Fox from entering bankruptcy. The studio sued Burton and Taylor for allegedly damaging the film's prospects at the box office with their behaviour, but it proved unsuccessful. Cleopatra was nominated for nine Academy Awards, winning for Best Production Design, Best Costume Design and Best Visual Effects.

The film marked the beginning of a series of collaborations with Taylor, in addition to making Burton one of the Top 10 box office draws until 1967. Burton played her tycoon husband Paul Andros in Anthony Asquith's The V.I.P.s (1963), an ensemble cast film described by Alpert as a "kind of Grand Hotel story" that was set in the VIP lounge of London Heathrow Airport; it proved to be a box-office hit despite mixed reviews. It was after The V.I.P.s that Burton became considerably more selective about his roles; he credited Taylor for this as he simply acted in films "to get rich" and she "made me see what kind of rubbish I was doing". Burton divorced Sybil in April 1963 after completing The V.I.P.s while Taylor was granted divorce from Fisher on 6 March 1964. Taylor then took a two-year hiatus from films until her next venture with Burton, The Sandpiper (1965). The supercouple, dubbed "Liz and Dick" by the press, continued starring together in films in the mid-1960s, earning a combined $88 million over the next decade and spending $65 million. Regarding their earnings, in a 1976 interview with Lester David and Jhan Robbins of The Ledger, Burton stated that "they say we generate more business activity than one of the smaller African nations" and that the couple "often outspent" the Greek business tycoon Aristotle Onassis.

In 1964, Burton portrayed Thomas Becket, the Archbishop of Canterbury who was martyred by Henry II of England, in the film adaptation of Jean Anouilh's historical play Becket. Both Alpert and historian Alex von Tunzelmann noted Burton gave an effective, restrained performance, contrasting with co-actor and friend Peter O'Toole's manic portrayal of Henry. Burton asked the film's director, Peter Glenville, not to oust him from the project like he had done for Adventure Story before accepting the role of Becket. Writing for The Christian Science Monitor, Peter Rainer labelled Burton as "extraordinary". Kenneth Turan of the Los Angeles Times appreciated Burton's on-screen chemistry with O'Toole and thought his portrayal of Becket served as "a reminder of how fine an actor Burton was". The film received twelve Oscar nominations, including Best Actor for both Burton and O'Toole; they lost to Harrison for My Fair Lady (1964). Burton and O'Toole also received nominations for Best Actor – Motion Picture Drama at the 22nd Golden Globe Awards, with O'Toole emerging victorious. Burton's triumph at the box office continued with his next appearance as the defrocked clergyman Dr. T. Lawrence Shannon in Tennessee Williams' The Night of the Iguana (1964) directed by John Huston; the film was also critically well received. Alpert believed Burton's success was due to how well he varied his acting with the three female characters, each of whom he tries to seduce differently: Ava Gardner (the randy hotel owner), Sue Lyon (the nubile American tourist), and Deborah Kerr (the poor, repressed artist). The success of Becket and The Night of the Iguana led Time magazine to term him "the new Mr. Box Office".

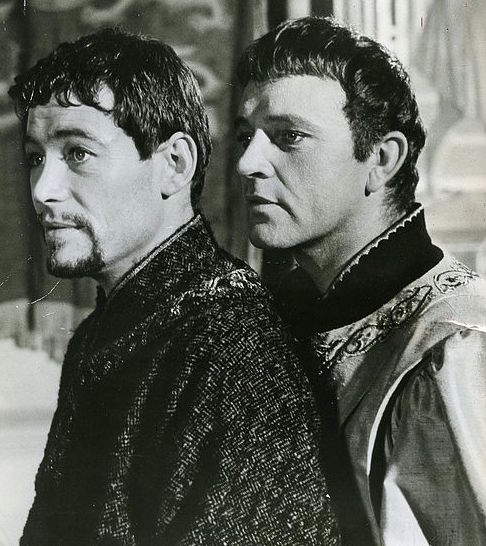
Burton (right) with Peter O'Toole in Becket (1964)

During the production of Becket, Burton went to watch Gielgud perform in the 1963 stage adaptation of Thornton Wilder's 1948 novel, The Ides of March. There he was confronted by Gielgud who asked what Burton planned to do as a part of the celebration of Shakespeare's quatercentenary. Burton told him he was approached by theatrical producer Alexander H. Cohen to do Hamlet in New York City. Burton had accepted Cohen's offer under the condition that Gielgud would direct it, which he conveyed to Gielgud. Gielgud agreed and soon production began in January 1964 after Burton had completed his work in Becket and The Night of the Iguana. (Note: O'Toole's version of how Burton came to work in Hamlet under Gielgud was a little different, but not conflicting according to Alpert. His version has him and Burton deciding they would both play Hamlet under the direction of Gielgud and Olivier in either London or New York City, with two coin tosses made for choice of director and location. Burton won the first toss and chose Gielgud and New York City while O'Toole won the second toss, selecting Olivier and London.) Taking into account Burton's dislike for wearing period clothing, as well as fellow actor Harley Granville-Barker's notion that the play was best approached as a "permanent rehearsal", Gielgud decided for Hamlet to be performed in a 'rehearsal' version with an incomplete set with the actors performing wearing their own clothes. Unaccustomed to this freedom, the cast found it hard to select the appropriate clothes and wore different attire day by day. After the first performance in Toronto, Gielgud decreed that the actors must wear capes as he felt it "lacked colour". In addition to being the play's director, Gielgud appeared as the Ghost of Hamlet's father. According to Gielgud's biographer Jonathan Croall, Burton's basic reading of Hamlet was "a much more vigorous, extrovert" version of Gielgud's own performance in 1936. Burton varied his interpretations of the character in later performances; he even tried a homosexual Hamlet.

When the play debuted at the Lunt-Fontanne Theatre in New York City, Burton garnered good reviews for his portrayal of a "bold and virile" Hamlet. Howard Taubman of The New York Times called it "a performance of electrical power and sweeping virility", noting that he had never known or seen "a Hamlet of such tempestuous manliness". A critic from Time magazine said that Burton "put his passion into Hamlet's language rather than the character. His acting is a technician's marvel. His voice has gem-cutting precision." Walter Kerr felt that though Burton carried "a certain lack of feeling" in his performance, he appreciated Burton's "reverberating" vocal projections. The opening night party was a lavish affair, attended by six hundred celebrities. The play ran for 137 performances, beating the previous record set by Gielgud himself in 1936. (Note: While Playbill magazine gives the number of performances as 137, Croall says it went on for 138 performances. Alpert and Bragg mention it to be 136 and 134 respectively.) The most successful aspect of the production, apart from Burton's performance, was generally considered to be Hume Cronyn's performance as Polonius, winning him the only Tony Award he would ever receive in a competitive category. Burton himself was nominated for his second Tony Award for Best Actor in a Play but lost to Alec Guinness for his portrayal of the poet Dylan Thomas. The performance was immortalised in a film that was created by recording three live performances on camera from 30 June 1964 to 1 July 1964 using a process called Electronovision; it played in US theatres for a week in 1964. The play was also the subject of books written by cast members William Redfield and Richard L. Sterne.

He had a theory that Hamlet could be played a hundred ways, and he tested every one of them. Within one scene, you might get Heathcliff, Sir Toby Belch, and Peck's Bad Boy.

— Alfred Drake, who played King Claudius, on how Burton made variations to the character of Hamlet.

Burton helped Taylor make her stage debut in A Poetry Reading, a recitation of poems by the couple as well as anecdotes and quotes from the plays Burton had participated in thus far. The idea was conceived by Burton as a benefit performance for his mentor Philip, whose conservatory, the American Musical and Dramatic Academy, had fallen short of funds. A Poetry Reading opened at the Lunt-Fontanne on 21 June 1964 to a packed house; the couple received a standing ovation at the end of their performance. Burton remarked on Taylor's performance, "I didn't know she was going to be this good." (Note: Some of the poems they recited were the metaphysical poet Andrew Marvell's "To His Coy Mistress", T. S. Eliot's "Portrait of a Lady", "Snake" by D. H. Lawrence and the Thomas Hardy satire "The Ruined Maid". Burton also gave a solo performance of the St Crispin's Day Speech portion from Henry V. The couple ended their recitation with Psalm 23, with Taylor reciting in English and Burton in Welsh.)

After Hamlet came to a close in August 1964, Burton and Taylor continued making films together. The first film after their marriage, The Sandpiper, was poorly received but still became a commercially successful venture. According to Bragg, the films they made during the mid-1960s contained a lot of innuendos that referred directly to their private lives. Burton went on to star opposite Claire Bloom and Oskar Werner in The Spy Who Came In from the Cold (1965), a Cold War espionage story about a British Intelligence agent, Alec Leamas (Burton), who is sent to East Germany on a mission to find and expose a mole working within his organisation for an East German Intelligence officer, Hans-Dieter Mundt (Peter van Eyck). Martin Ritt, the film's director and producer, wanted Burton's character to exhibit more anonymity, which meant no display of eloquent speeches or intense emotional moments. Bragg believed this decision worried Burton, as he had generated his reputation as an actor with those exact traits, and wondered how the film's would turn out. Ritt, a non-drinker, was displeased with Burton's drinking habits as he felt it "lacked a certain discipline" and expected the same level of commitment from him as everyone else during filming. In spite of their differences, Alpert notes that the film transpired well. Based on the 1963 novel of the same name by John le Carré, The Spy Who Came in from the Cold garnered positive reviews, with Fernando F. Croce of Slant Magazine describing Burton's performance as more of "tragic patsy than swashbuckler" and believed his scenes with Werner "have sharp doses of suspicion, cynicism and sadness". Dave Kehr of the Chicago Reader called the film "Grim, monotonous, and rather facile", he found Burton's role had "some honest poignancy". Variety thought Burton fitted "neatly into the role of the apparently burned out British agent". Burton also made a brief appearance the same year in Clive Donner's comedy What's New Pussycat? as a man who meets the womaniser Michael James (O'Toole) in a bar.

In 1966, Burton and Taylor enjoyed their greatest on-screen success in Mike Nichols's film version of Edward Albee's black comedy play Who's Afraid of Virginia Woolf?, in which a bitter erudite couple trade vicious barbs in front of their guests, Nick (George Segal) and Honey (Sandy Dennis). Burton wanted Taylor for the character of Martha "to stop everyone else from playing it". He didn't want anyone else to do it as he thought it could be for Elizabeth what Hamlet was for him. Burton was not the first choice for the role of George. Jack Lemmon was offered the role initially, but when he turned it down, Warner Bros. president Jack L. Warner agreed on Burton and paid him $750,000. Nichols was hired to helm the project at Taylor's request, despite having never directed a film. Albee preferred Bette Davis and James Mason for Martha and George respectively, fearing that the Burtons' strong screen presence would dominate the film. Instead, it proved to be what Alpert described as "the summit of both Richard's and Elizabeth's careers".

The film's script, adapted from Albee's play by Ernest Lehman, broke new ground for its raw language and harsh depiction of marriage. So immersed had the Burtons become in the roles of George and Martha over the months of shooting that, after it was wrapped up, he and Taylor found it difficult not to be George and Martha, "I feel rather lost." Later the couple would state that the film took its toll on their relationship, and that Taylor was "tired of playing Martha" in real life. Who's Afraid of Virginia Woolf? garnered critical acclaim, with film critic Stanley Kauffmann of The New York Times calling it "one of the most scathingly honest American films ever made". Kaufman observed Burton to be "utterly convincing as a man with a great lake of nausea in him, on which he sails with regret and compulsive amusement", and Taylor "does the best work of her career, sustained and urgent". In her review for The New York Daily News, Kate Cameron thought Taylor "nothing less than brilliant as the shrewish, slovenly. blasphemous, frustrated, slightly wacky, alcoholic wife" while noting that the film gave Burton "a chance to display his disciplined art in the role of the victim of a wife's vituperative tongue". However, Andrew Sarris of The Village Voice criticised Taylor, believing her performance "lack[ed] genuine warmth" but his review of Burton was more favourable, noting that he gave "a performance of electrifying charm". Although all four actors received Academy Award nominations for their roles in the film, which received a total of thirteen nominations, only Taylor and Dennis went on to win. Both Burton and Taylor won their first BAFTA Awards for Best British Actor and Best British Actress respectively; the former also for his role in The Spy Who Came in from the Cold.

Burton and Taylor next performed a 1966 Oxford Playhouse adaptation of Christopher Marlowe's Doctor Faustus; the couple did the play to benefit the Oxford University Dramatic Society and as a token of Burton's gratitude to Nevill Coghill. Burton starred as the titular character, Doctor Faustus while Taylor played her first stage role as Helen of Troy, a non-speaking part. The play received negative reviews but Burton's and Taylor's performances were reviewed constructively. Irving Wardle of The Times called it "University drama at its worst" while the American newspaper columnist John Crosby, in his review for The Observer, lauded Burton's speech where he asks God to be merciful, stating that: "It takes a great actor to deliver that speech without wringing a strangled sob of laughter out of one. But Burton did it." The play nevertheless made $22,000, which Coghill was happy with. Doctor Faustus was adapted for the screen the following year by both Burton and Coghill, with Burton making his directorial debut. He also co-produced the film with Taylor and Coghill; it was critically panned and was a box office failure. The couple's next collaboration was Franco Zeffirelli's lively version of Shakespeare's The Taming of the Shrew (1967). The film was a challenge for Burton, who had to chase Taylor on rooftops, noting that he was "permitted to do extreme physical things that wouldn't have been allowed with any other actress". Zeffirelli recalled that Taylor, who had no prior experience performing in a Shakespeare play, "gave the more interesting performance because she invented the part from scratch". Of Burton, the director felt he was, to an extent, "affected by his knowledge of the classics". The Taming of the Shrew also became a notable critical and commercial success. He had another quick collaboration with Zeffirelli narrating the documentary, Florence: Days of Destruction, which was about the 1966 flood of the Arno that devastated the city of Florence, Italy; the film raised $20 million for the flood relief efforts. By the end of 1967, the combined box office gross of films Burton and Taylor had acted in had reached $200 million. According to biographers John Cottrell and Fergus Cashin, when Burton and Taylor contemplated taking a three-month break from acting, Hollywood "almost had a nervous breakdown" as nearly half the U.S. cinema industry's income for films in theatrical distribution came from pictures starring one or both of them. Later collaborations from the Burtons like The Comedians (1967), which was based on Graham Greene's 1966 novel of the same name, and the Tennessee Williams adaptation Boom! (1968) were critical and commercial failures.

In 1968, Burton enjoyed a commercial blockbuster with Clint Eastwood in the World War II action film Where Eagles Dare; he received a $1 million fee plus a share of the film's box office gross. According to his daughter Kate Burton, "He did that one for us kids, because we kept asking him, 'Can you do a fun movie that we can go see?'" Eastwood thought the script "terrible" and was "all exposition and complications". He asked the film's producer Elliott Kastner and its screenwriter Alistair MacLean to be given less dialogue, later remarking "I just stood around firing my machine gun while Burton handled the dialogue." Burton enjoyed working with Eastwood and said of the picture that he "did all the talking and [Eastwood] did all the killing". Burton's last film of the decade, Anne of the Thousand Days (1969) for which he was paid $1.25 million, (equivalent to $10,974,365 in 2025) was commercially successful but garnered mixed opinions from reviewers. Noted British film critic Tom Milne of Time Out magazine believed that Burton "plays throughout on a monotonous note of bluff ferocity". Conversely, Vincent Canby of The New York Times appreciated Burton's portrayal of the English monarch, noting that he "is in excellent form and voice—funny, loutish and sometimes wise". Anne of the Thousand Days received ten nominations at the 42nd Academy Awards, including one for Burton's performance as Henry VIII of England, which many thought to be largely the result of an expensive advertising campaign by Universal Studios. The same year, Staircase in which he and his Cleopatra co-star Rex Harrison appeared as a bickering homosexual couple, received negative reviews and was unsuccessful.

=== 1970–1984: Later career and final years ===
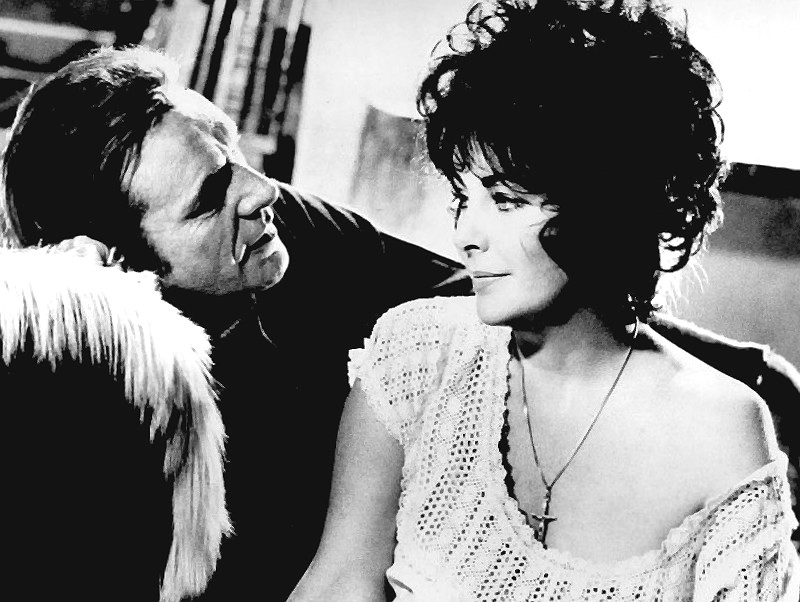
In Divorce His, Divorce Hers (1973), his final film with Taylor

Appointed Commander of the Order of the British Empire (CBE) in the 1970 Birthday Honours, he received the honour at Buckingham Palace on his 45th birthday; Taylor and Cis attended the ceremony. He attributed not being knighted to changing his residence from London to Céligny to escape taxes. From the 1970s, after his completion of Anne of the Thousand Days, Burton began to work in mediocre films, which hurt his career. This was partly due to the Burtons' extravagant spending, his increasing addiction to alcohol, and his claim that he could not "find any worthy material that is pertinent to our times". He recognised his financial need to work, and understood in the New Hollywood era of cinema, neither he nor Taylor would be paid as well as at the height of their stardom. Some of the films he made during this period include: Bluebeard (1972), Hammersmith Is Out (1972), Battle of Sutjeska (1973), The Klansman (1974), and Exorcist II: The Heretic (1977). His last film with Taylor was the two-part melodrama Divorce His, Divorce Hers (1973). He did enjoy one major critical success in the 1970s with the film version of his stage hit Equus, winning the Golden Globe Award as well as garnering an Academy Award nomination. Public sentiment towards his perennial frustration at not winning an Oscar made many pundits consider him the favourite to finally win the award, but he lost to Richard Dreyfuss in The Goodbye Girl.

In 1976, Burton received a Grammy Award in the category of Best Recording for Children for his narration of The Little Prince by Antoine de Saint-Exupéry. His narration of Jeff Wayne's Musical Version of The War of the Worlds became such a necessary part of the concept album that a hologram of Burton was used to narrate the live stage show (touring in 2006, 2007, 2009 and 2010) of the musical. In 2011, however, Liam Neeson was cast in the part for a "New Generation" re-recording, and replaced Burton as the hologram character in the stage show.

Burton had an international box-office hit with The Wild Geese (1978), an adventure tale about mercenaries in Africa. The film was a success in Europe but had only limited distribution in the United States owing to the collapse of the studio that distributed it. He returned to films with The Medusa Touch (1978), Circle of Two (1980), and the title role in Wagner (1983). His last film performance as O'Brien in Nineteen Eighty-Four (1984) was critically acclaimed though he was not the first choice for the role. According to the film's director, Michael Radford, Paul Scofield was originally contracted to play the part, but had to withdraw due to a broken leg; Sean Connery, Marlon Brando and Rod Steiger were all approached before Burton was cast. He had "heard stories" about Burton's heavy drinking, which had concerned the producers.

Burton's last acting appearance was in the miniseries Ellis Island, which aired posthumously on CBS in November 1984. At the time of his death, he was preparing to film Wild Geese II, the sequel to The Wild Geese, which was eventually released in 1985. Burton was to reprise the role of Colonel Faulkner, while Laurence Olivier was cast as Rudolf Hess. After his death, Burton was replaced by Edward Fox, and the character changed to Faulkner's younger brother.

== Personal life ==
=== Marriages and relationships ===
Burton was married five times, twice consecutively to Taylor.

From 1949 until 1963, he was married to Sybil Williams, with whom he had two daughters, Kate (born 1957) and Jessica Burton (born 1959). During the marriage Burton had a long affair with actress Claire Bloom. Burton told biographer Michael Munn "'I only ever loved two women before Elizabeth,' Sybil was one, Claire Bloom the other."

Burton's marriages to Taylor lasted from 15 March 1964 to 26 June 1974 and from 10 October 1975 to 29 July 1976. Their first wedding was at the Ritz-Carlton Hotel in Montreal. Of their marriage, Taylor proclaimed, "I'm so happy you can't believe it. This marriage will last forever." Their second wedding took place 16 months after their divorce, in Chobe National Park in Botswana. Taylor and Eddie Fisher had adopted a daughter from Germany, Maria McKeown (born 1961), who was re-adopted by Burton after he and Taylor married. Burton also re-adopted Taylor and producer Mike Todd's daughter, Elizabeth Frances "Liza" Todd (born 1957), who had been first adopted by Fisher.

The relationship Burton and Taylor portrayed in the film Who's Afraid of Virginia Woolf? was popularly likened to their real-life marriage. Burton disagreed with others about Taylor's famed beauty, saying that calling her "the most beautiful woman in the world is absolute nonsense. She has wonderful eyes, but she has a double chin and an overdeveloped chest, and she's rather short in the leg." In August 1976, a month after his second divorce from Taylor, Burton married model Suzy Miller, the former wife of Formula 1 Champion James Hunt; the marriage ended in divorce in 1982. From 1983 until his death in 1984, Burton was married to a freelance production assistant Sally Hay.

In 1974, between his divorce from and remarriage to Taylor, he was briefly engaged to Princess Elizabeth of Yugoslavia.

In 1957, Burton had earned a total of £82,000 from Prince of Players, The Rains of Ranchipur and Alexander the Great, but only managed to keep £6,000 for personal expenses due to taxation imposed by the then-ruling Conservative government. As a result of a suggestion by his lawyer Aaron Frosch that he move to Switzerland, where the tax rate was lower, Burton moved with Sybil in January 1957 to Céligny, Switzerland, where he purchased a villa. In response to criticism from the British government, Burton remarked: "I believe that everyone should pay them — except actors." Burton lived there until his death. In 1968, Burton's elder brother, Ifor, slipped and fell, breaking his neck, after a lengthy drinking session with Burton in Céligny. The injury left him paralysed from the neck down. His younger brother Graham Jenkins speculated that guilt over this may have caused Burton to start drinking very heavily, particularly after Ifor died in 1972.

In a February 1975 interview with his friend David Lewin, he said he "tried" homosexuality. He also suggested that perhaps all actors were latent homosexuals, and "we cover it up with drink". In 2000, Ellis Amburn's biography of Elizabeth Taylor suggested that Burton had an affair with Laurence Olivier and tried to seduce Eddie Fisher, although this was strongly denied by Burton's younger brother Graham Jenkins.

Burton admired and was inspired by the actor and dramatist Emlyn Williams. He employed his son, Brook Williams, as his personal assistant and adviser. Williams was given small roles in some of the films in which Burton starred.

=== Personal views ===
Politically, Burton was a lifelong socialist, although he was never as heavily involved in politics as his close friend Stanley Baker. He admired Democratic senator Robert F. Kennedy and once got into a sonnet-quoting contest with him.

In 1972, Burton played Leon Trotsky in The Assassination of Trotsky. The next year, he agreed to play Josip Broz Tito in a film biography, since he admired the Yugoslav leader. While filming in Yugoslavia he publicly proclaimed that he was a communist, saying he felt no contradiction between earning vast sums of money for films and holding left-wing views since "unlike capitalists, I don't exploit other people".

In November 1974, Burton was banned permanently from BBC productions for writing two newspaper articles questioning the sanity of Winston Churchill and others in power during World War II. Burton reported hating them "virulently" for the alleged promise to wipe out all Japanese people on the planet. The publication of these articles coincided with what would have been the 100th year since Churchill's birth and came after Burton had played him in a favourable light in A Walk with Destiny.

On his religious views, Burton was an atheist, stating: "I wish I could believe in a God of some kind but I simply cannot."

=== Health problems ===
Burton was a heavy smoker. In a December 1977 interview with Sir Ludovic Kennedy, Burton said he was smoking 60–100 cigarettes per day. According to his younger brother, as stated in Graham Jenkins's 1988 book Richard Burton: My Brother, he smoked at least 100 cigarettes a day. After his father died from a cerebral haemorrhage in March 1957, Burton declined to attend his funeral. Burton was also an alcoholic most of his adult life. According to biographer Robert Sellers, "At the height of his drinking in the mid-1970's ,he was getting through three to four bottles of spirits a day."

After nearly drinking himself to death during the shooting of The Klansman (1974), Burton dried out at Saint John's Health Center in Santa Monica, California. Burton was allegedly inebriated while making the movie, and many of his scenes had to be filmed with him sitting or lying down due to his inability to stand upright. In some scenes, he appears to slur his words or speak incoherently. Burton later said that he could not remember making the film. Co-star O. J. Simpson said "There would be times when he couldn't move".

According to his diaries, Burton used Antabuse to try to stop his excessive consumption of alcohol, which he blamed for wrecking his marriage to Taylor. Burton himself said of the time leading up to his near loss of life, "I was fairly sloshed for five years. I was up there with John Barrymore and Robert Newton. The ghosts of them were looking over my shoulder." He said that he turned to the bottle for solace "to burn up the flatness, the stale, empty, dull deadness that one feels when one goes offstage". The 1988 biography by Melvyn Bragg provides a detailed description of the many health issues that plagued Burton throughout his life. In his youth, Burton had been known for being exceptionally strong and athletic.

By the age of 41, he had declined so far in health that by his own admission, his arms were thin and weak. He suffered from bursitis, possibly aggravated by faulty treatment, arthritis, dermatitis, cirrhosis of the liver, and kidney disease, as well as developing, by his mid-forties, a pronounced limp. How much of this was due to his intake of alcohol is impossible to ascertain, according to Bragg, because of Burton's reluctance to be treated for alcoholism. In 1974, Burton spent six weeks in a clinic to recuperate from a period during which he had drunk three bottles of vodka a day. Health issues continued to plague him until his death.

=== Declining health and death ===
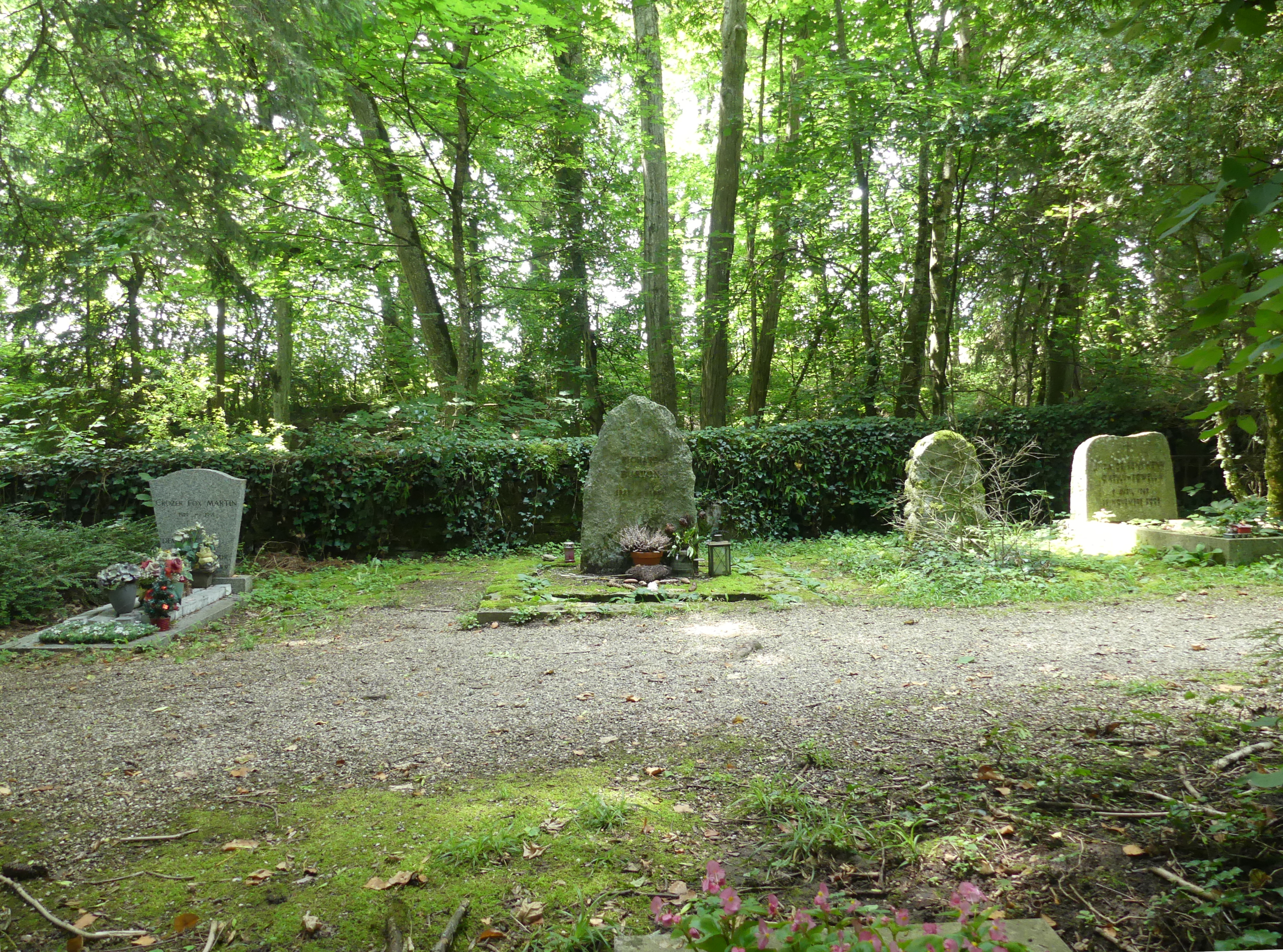
Burton's grave, just a few paces away from the tomb of Alistair MacLean

Burton died from intracerebral haemorrhage at his home in Céligny, Switzerland, on 5 August 1984, aged 58. Although his death was sudden, his health had been declining for several years, and he suffered from constant and severe neck pain. As early as March 1970, he had been warned that his liver was enlarged, and he was diagnosed with cirrhosis and kidney disease in April 1981.

Burton was buried at the Old Cemetery (Vieux Cimetière) of Céligny with a copy of Dylan Thomas's poems.

Burton left an estate worth US$4.58 million (equivalent to $14,193,306 in 2025). The bulk of his estate consisted of real estate, investments in three countries, and works of art. Most of his estate was bequeathed to his widow, Sally Hay.

== Acting credits and accolades ==
Burton received numerous accolades including a British Academy Film Award, two Golden Globe Awards, a Grammy Award, and two Tony Awards (including a Special Tony Award) as well as nominations for a Primetime Emmy Award. For his contributions to cinema, Burton was inducted posthumously into the Hollywood Walk of Fame in 2013 with a motion pictures star located at 6336 Hollywood Boulevard. For his contributions to theatre, Burton was inducted into the Theatre Hall of Fame.

Despite seven Academy Award nominations Burton failed to win an Oscar. Over his distinguished career he has been recognised by the Academy of Motion Picture Arts and Sciences for the following performances:

- 25th Academy Awards: Best Supporting Actor, nomination, My Cousin Rachel (1952)
- 26th Academy Awards: Best Actor, nomination, The Robe (1953)
- 37th Academy Awards: Best Actor, nomination, Becket (1964)
- 38th Academy Awards: Best Actor, nomination, The Spy Who Came in from the Cold (1965)
- 39th Academy Awards: Best Actor, nomination, Who's Afraid of Virginia Woolf? (1966)
- 42nd Academy Awards: Best Actor, nomination, Anne of the Thousand Days (1969)
- 50th Academy Awards: Best Actor, nomination, Equus (1977)

On 10 November 2025, the centenary of his birth, blue plaques were unveiled at Burton's birth place at Pontrhydyfen, and at the Port Talbot house where he lived with his legal guardian, Philip Burton.

== Society and culture ==
In 2012 Yale University Press published The Richard Burton Diaries. Edited by Chris Williams, the book comprised extracts from diaries written between 1939 and 1983.

Burton is portrayed by Dominic West, opposite Helena Bonham Carter, in 2013's Burton & Taylor.

In 2025, Mr Burton, a British biographical drama film starring Harry Lawtey as a young Richard Burton and Toby Jones as Philip Burton, was released.

== See also ==
- List of Academy Award winners and nominees from Great Britain
- List of atheists in film, radio, television and theatre

== Bibliography ==
Works by Burton

- Burton, Richard (1964). A Christmas Story. William Morrow.
- Burton, Richard (2012). Williams, Chris (ed.). The Richard Burton Diaries. Yale University Press. ISBN 9780300192315.

Primary works

- Alpert, Hollis (1986). Burton. New York City: G. P. Putnam's Sons. ISBN 978-0-399-13093-9.
- Bragg, Melvyn (1988). Richard Burton: A Life. Boston: Little, Brown and Company. ISBN 978-0-316-10595-8.
- Burton, Philip (1992). Richard & Philip: The Burtons : a Book of Memories. London: Peter Owen Publishers. ISBN 978-0-7206-0855-7.
- Cottrell, John; Cashin, Fergus (1971). Richard Burton, very close up. Upper Saddle River, New Jersey: Prentice Hall. ISBN 978-0-13-780908-0.
- Ferris, Paul (1981). Richard Burton. New York City: Coward, McCann & Geoghegan. ISBN 978-0-698-11106-6.
- Jenkins, David; Rogers, Sue (1993). Richard Burton: A Brother Remembered. Ann Arbor, Michigan: Century. ISBN 978-0-712-65768-6.
- Jenkins, Graham (25 January 1988). Richard Burton: My Brother. London: Michael Joseph. ISBN 978-2868045263.
- Munn, Michael (20 March 2014). Richard Burton: Prince of Players. London: Aurum Press. ISBN 978-1-78131-373-2.
- Rubython, Tom (2011): And God Created Burton. London: Myrtle Press - ISBN 978-0-9565656-2-4

Secondary works

- Babula, William (1981). Shakespeare in production, 1935–1978: a selective catalogue. London: Garland Science. ISBN 978-0-824-09814-8.
- Burton, Alan; Chibnall, Steve (11 July 2013). Historical Dictionary of British Cinema. Lanham, Maryland: Scarecrow Press. ISBN 978-0-81-088026-9.
- Cashmore, Ellis (25 February 2016). Elizabeth Taylor: A Private Life for Public Consumption. London: Bloomsbury Publishing. ISBN 978-1-6289-2069-7.
- Croall, Jonathan (2000). Gielgud – A Theatrical Life, 1904–2000. London: Methuen Publishing. ISBN 978-0-8264-1403-8.
- Erskine, Thomas L.; Welsh, James Michael; Tibbetts, John C. (2000). Video Versions: Film Adaptations of Plays on Video. Westport, Connecticut: Greenwood Publishing Group. ISBN 978-0-313-30185-8.
- Gilleman, Luc (4 February 2014). John Osborne: Vituperative Artist. New York City: Routledge. ISBN 978-1-3178-4281-1.
- Harper, Sam; Smith, Justin (30 November 2011). British Film Culture in the 1970s: The Boundaries of Pleasure. Edinburgh: Edinburgh University Press. ISBN 978-0-7486-5428-4.
- Hischak, Thomas S. (16 March 2009). Broadway Plays and Musicals: Descriptions and Essential Facts of More Than 14,000 Shows through 2007. Jefferson, North Carolina: McFarland & Company. ISBN 978-0-7864-3448-0.
- Hirschhorn, Clive (1979). The Warner Bros. Story. New York City: Crown Publishing Group. ISBN 978-0-5175-3834-0.
- Holder, Noddy (18 September 2014). The World According To Noddy: Life Lessons Learned In and Out of Rock & Roll. London: Hachette. ISBN 978-1-47211-565-2.
- Jedlicka, Davor (11 June 2011). Affinographs: A Dynamic Method for Assessment of Individuals, Couples, Families, and Households. New York City: Springer Science+Business Media. ISBN 978-1-44199-395-3.
- Kashner, Sam; Schoenberger, Nancy (2010). Furious Love: Elizabeth Taylor, Richard Burton, and the Marriage of the Century. New York City: HarperCollins. ISBN 978-0-06-156284-6.
- Kingsland, Rosemary (3 July 2003). Hold Back the Night: A Memoir of a Stolen Childhood and an Extraordinary Love Affair. Century. ISBN 978-1844131891.
- Lewis, Roger (2023). Erotic Vagrancy: Everything about Richard Burton and Elizabeth Taylor. London: Hachette. ISBN 978-0-85-738172-9.
- MacKenzie, S. P. (28 January 2016). The Battle of Britain on Screen: ?The Few? in British Film and Television Drama. New York: Bloomsbury Publishing. ISBN 978-1-4742-2847-3.
- McGilligan, Patrick (19 August 2002) [1999]. Clint: The Life and Legend. New York City: St. Martin's Press. ISBN 978-0-312-29032-0.
- Morley, Sheridan (11 May 2010). John Gielgud: The Authorized Biography. New York City: Simon & Schuster. ISBN 978-1-4391-1617-3.
- Monaco, James (1991). The Encyclopedia of Film. New York City: Perigee Books. ISBN 978-0-399-51604-7.
- Parish, James Robert (6 January 2011). The Hollywood Book of Extravagance: The Totally Infamous, Mostly Disastrous, and Always Compelling Excesses of America's Film and TV Idols. Hoboken, New Jersey: John Wiley & Sons. ISBN 978-1-11803-902-1.
- Radner, Hilary; Luckett, Moya (1999). Swinging Single: Representing Sexuality in the 1960s. Minneapolis: University of Minnesota Press. ISBN 978-0-8166-3351-7.
- Ryall, Tom (19 July 2013). Anthony Asquith. Manchester: Manchester University Press. ISBN 978-0-7190-6452-4.
- Schoch, Richard; Williams, Gary Jay (31 March 2011). "Edwin Booth: What They Also Saw When They Saw Booth's Hamlet". Macready, Booth, Terry, Irving: Great Shakespeareans:, Volume 6. London: Continuum International Publishing Group. ISBN 978-1-4411-6656-2.
- Sterne, Richard L. (1967). John Gielgud directs Richard Burton in Hamlet: a journal of rehearsals. London: Random House. ISBN 978-0-4351-8352-3.
- Thomas, Tony (1983). The Films of Olivia de Havilland. New York City: Citadel Press. ISBN 978-0-8065-0988-4.
- Tynan, Kathleen (29 February 2012). Tynan Letters. London: Random House. ISBN 978-1-44649-918-4.
- Walker, Alexander (1990). Elizabeth: The Life of Elizabeth Taylor. New York City: Grove Press. ISBN 978-0-8021-3769-2.
- Wiley, Mason; Bona, Damien (1986). Inside Oscar: The Unofficial History of the Academy Awards. New York City: Ballantine Books. p. 434. ISBN 978-0-3453-4777-0.

Husband of Elizabeth Taylor
Preceded by Eddie Fisher	Husband of Elizabeth Taylor (by order of marriage); 1964–1974; 1975–1976	Succeeded by John Warner
