= Michael Munn =

British author and film historian (c. 1952 – 2022)

Michael Munn (October 8, 1952 – July 2022) was a British author, film historian, and actor.

Munn's biography of Steve McQueen has been described as preposterous, and doubt cast on his biographies of Frank Sinatra, John Wayne, Jimmy Stewart, Sir Laurence Olivier, Richard Burton, and David Niven.

Munn lived in Sudbury, Suffolk. He died from a heart attack in July 2022, at the age of 69.

== Selected books ==
- 1982 The Stories Behind the Scenes of the Great Film Epics – Illustrated Publications ISBN 978-0-85242-729-3
- 1986 Charlton Heston – Robson Books ISBN 978-0-86051-362-9
- 1987 The Hollywood Murder Casebook – Robson Books ISBN 978-0-86051-414-5
- 1989 Kirk Douglas – St. Martin's Press ISBN 978-0-312-91370-0
- 1989 Trevor Howard: The Man and His Films – Robson Books ISBN 978-0-86051-539-5
- 1991 Hollywood Rogues – Robson Books ISBN 978-0-86051-638-5
- 1992 Clint Eastwood: Hollywood's Loner – Robson Books ISBN 0-86051-790-X
- 1992 with Sparks, William The Last of the Cockleshell Heroes: A World War Two Memoir – ISIS Large Print ISBN 978-1-85695-125-8
- 1993 Hollywood Bad – St. Martin's Press ISBN 978-0-312-92984-8
- 1993 The Hollywood Connection: The True Story of Organized Crime in Hollywood — Robson Books ISBN 978-0-86051-856-3
- 1995 Burt Lancaster: The Terrible-Tempered Charmer – Robson Books ISBN 978-0-86051-970-6
- 1995 Stars at War – Robson Books ISBN 978-0-86051-954-6
- 1996 X-rated: The Paranormal Experiences of the Movie Star Greats — Robson Books ISBN 978-1-86105-017-5
- 1997 Gene Hackman — Robert Hale ISBN 978-0-7090-6041-3
- 1997 The Sharon Stone Story – Robson Books ISBN 978-1-86105-094-6
- 1999 Gregory Peck – ISIS Large Print Books ISBN 978-0-7531-5097-9
- 2002 Sinatra: The Untold Story – Robson Books ISBN 978-1-86105-537-8
- 2003 John Wayne: The Man Behind the Myth – Robson Books ISBN 978-1-86105-614-6
- 2005 Jimmy Stewart: The Truth Behind the Legend – Robson Books ISBN 978-1-86105-822-5
- 2007 Lord Larry: The Secret Life of Laurence Olivier – Robson Books ISBN 978-1-86105-977-2
- 2008 Richard Burton: Prince of Players – Skyhorse Pub. ISBN 978-1-60239-355-4
- 2009 David Niven: The Man Behind the Balloon – JR Books Ltd ISBN 978-1-906779-16-0
- 2010 Steve McQueen: Living on the Edge – Aurum Press ISBN 978-1-906779-79-5
