= Dyffryn School =

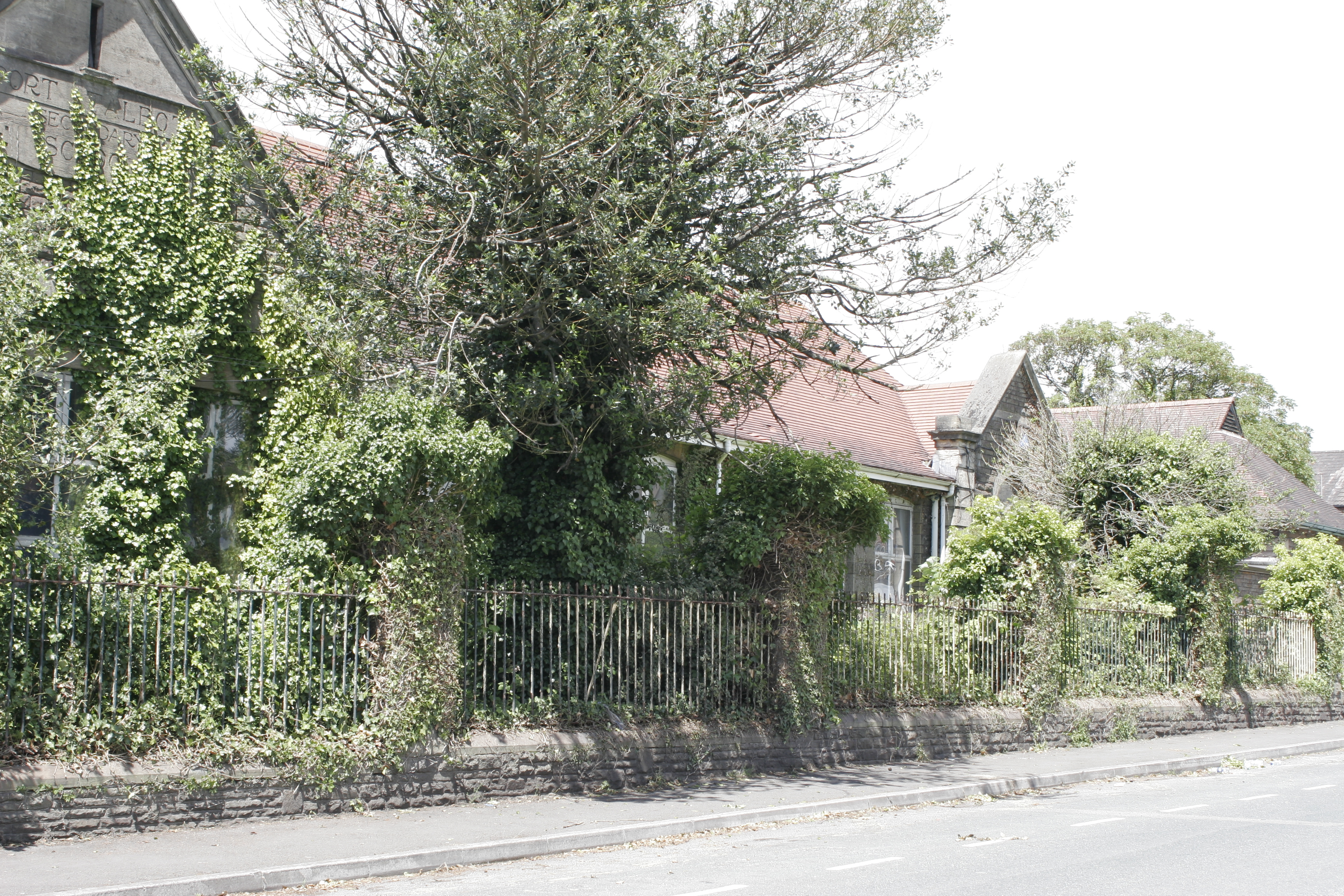

Location
- 3 Talcennau Road; Port Talbot, Neath Port Talbot, SA13 1EP; Wales

Information
- Type: Comprehensive
- Established: 1912
- Closed: 2018
- Local authority: Neath Port Talbot
- Gender: Co-educational
- Age: 11 (Year 7) to 16 (Year 11)
- Closed to Facilitate: Ysgol Cwm Brombil

Dyffryn Comprehensive was a split-site 11 to 16 years comprehensive school based in Port Talbot, South Wales.

== Description and history ==
It was situated on two sites. Year 7 and 8 pupils were taught in the lower school on Talcennau Road in the centre of Port Talbot, whilst Years 9, 10 and 11 were taught at the site on Bertha Road in Margam. The school first opened in 1900, initially taking around 200 students as the Port Talbot Secondary School and became known informally as "The Sec". It was academically selective, being one of the two grammar schools (Note: Port Talbot County School and Port Talbot Secondary School) in Port Talbot. The name Port Talbot Secondary Grammar School was also used. In 1953, the school was renamed to Dyffryn Grammar School but 12 years later with the introduction of comprehensive education the school was re-named to Dyffryn Comprehensive School. The lower school was built of red brick with a small tarmacked playing area. The upper school was demolished in 2017-2019 to make room for playing fields of a new school, Ysgol Cwm Brombil.

In 2009, Dyffryn became the first in the county borough to offer a savings facility for its pupils. It had the only "Interact Club" in the area, where pupils think up ways to donate to charity and choose charities to donate to.

Dyffryn was one of the only schools in the country borough to run a School Interact Club. Interact Club is the youth version of the Rotary Club and has raised thousands of pounds for local and international charities, which the pupils themselves decided to support.

Between 2011 and 2012, the school was in band one of the school rankings in Wales.

In 2015, Sally Burton made a donation to the school of her late husband's French dictionary (Harrap's New Shorter French and English Dictionary 1977 edition).

Dyffryn Comprehensive was well-known for its strict uniform policy, where the students would commonly wear a black uniform with a green and black striped tie. The uniform policy had changed many times in Dyffryn's history. However, the most notable change was the introduction of black blazers in the year 2016.

Dyffryn School closed in 2018 when it was replaced by a school (Ysgol Cwm Brombil) built on Bertha Road at the location of the former Upper School, following its closure and demolition.

The final headmaster was Martin Grimes, who was the last headmaster of Dyffryn School before its closure on the 31 August 2018.

== Notable former pupils ==
- Richard Burton, actor
- Dennis Burgess, actor
- Brinley Jenkins, actor
