= Sally Burton =

British author and theatre producer

- Born: Sally Anne Hay; 21 January 1948 (age 78); Braintree, Essex, England
- Occupations: Theatre producer; author; philanthropist
- Spouse: Richard Burton (m. 1983; died 1984)

Sally Anne Burton (née Hay; born 21 January 1948) is a British author and theatre producer. She is the widow of actor Richard Burton, having been his fourth wife.

== Personal life ==
Burton was born Sally Anne Hay in Braintree, Essex, the daughter of journalist Jack Hay. She was working as a freelance production assistant on the set of the TV mini-series Wagner when she met Richard Burton. During a seven-month tour of the United States with Noël Coward's play Private Lives, in which Elizabeth Taylor was Richard Burton's co-star, Burton and Hay married on 3 July 1983 in Las Vegas; it was Burton's fifth marriage and her first. After the tour, they went to rest in Hawaii for several months before returning to their home in Céligny where Burton died on 5 August 1984; Sally Burton was then 36.

In 2012 Burton published the diaries of Richard Burton. She said her motivation was to show Burton's "love for words". In her review of the book, Barbara Ellen in The Guardian wrote

The suspicion forms that Sally's unspoken motivation was to derail, once and for all, the Liz-Dickie show. To demonstrate that, despite all those tales of Burton's sending secret final love letters to Taylor, in which he wrote of yearning to "come home" to her, in truth, he had gone right off her, and, considering what he was writing, near despised her. To my mind, this none-too-subtle attempt to undermine the Burton/Taylor-myth looks a bit vindictive – especially considering that Taylor is dead now, and can't flash those violet eyes, and open that fabulous fishwife mouth, in reply.

Simon De Bruxelles wrote of the diaries in 2012, "The depth of Richard Burton's passion for Elizabeth Taylor is laid bare in diary extracts to be published for the first time this year ... beautiful beyond the dreams of pornography."

The diaries had been kept since 1965 and Burton, "... always maintained that they were personal and not intended for publication."

== Philanthropy ==
Burton donated the Richard Burton Collection to Swansea University in 2005 and she received an honorary fellowship from that university in 2006.

In 2005, Burton moved to Perth, Western Australia, where her brother and his family had lived for years. In 2009, she launched the Richard Burton Award for New Plays, in conjunction with Black Swan State Theatre Company offering a prize pool of A$30,000 for writers of unproduced scripts; this is Australia's richest prize for playwrights. The 2010 first prize of A$20,000 was awarded to Caleb Lewis; Hellie Turner was awarded the runner-up prize of A$10,000. The prize was not awarded in 2011 and new guidelines were drawn for 2012. The award was shared in 2012 by Ingle Knight and Tommy Murphy who would each receive a commission of $15,000 at the completion of a new play. No further awards have been announced and the award has ceased.

Burton was patron of the Black Swan State Theatre Company from 2009 to 2012. She is a supporter of the West Australian Symphony Orchestra. She was a board member of Agelink, a theatre company for older actors. Established in 2007 She presents the Sally Burton Awards, a prize pool of A$4,000, to the two most talented performers of Shakespeare texts at the Western Australian Academy of Performing Arts.

== Production ==
In 2009 she launched the independent production house Onward Production whose productions ran from 2009 to 2011. In October that year she produced the Australian première of the international touring anthology Seven Deadly Sins Four Deadly Sinners at the Playhouse Theatre in Perth and Noël Coward's Private Lives at Perth's Subiaco Arts Centre.

She is also the executive producer of the British documentary series Great West End Theatres.

== Private life ==
Burton had moved to Perth, Australia to be closer to her brother and his family. She first moved into a house in Subiaco, then purchased a recently built nearby house in 2007. In August 2017 she put her home on the market and returned to the UK to live in Rowhedge, Essex.

== Bibliography ==
=== Books ===
- Burton, Sally (1989). The Barren Patch. Penguin Books. ISBN 978-0-14-010396-0.

=== Book reviews ===
- 2011: Burton, Sally (September 2011). "When man created film". Australian Book Review. 334: 38–39., reviewed: Drazin, Charles (2011). The Faber Book of French Cinema. Faber.

=== Other writings ===
- Burton, Richard (1989). A Christmas Story. Introduction by Sally Burton. Hodder & Stoughton. ISBN 978-0-340-51246-3.
