= Amanda Kirby =

Amanda Kirby may refer to:

- Amanda Kirby (neurodiversity scholar)
- Amanda Kirby (actress)
- Amanda Kirby (character)
