= Richard Burton on stage, screen, radio and record =

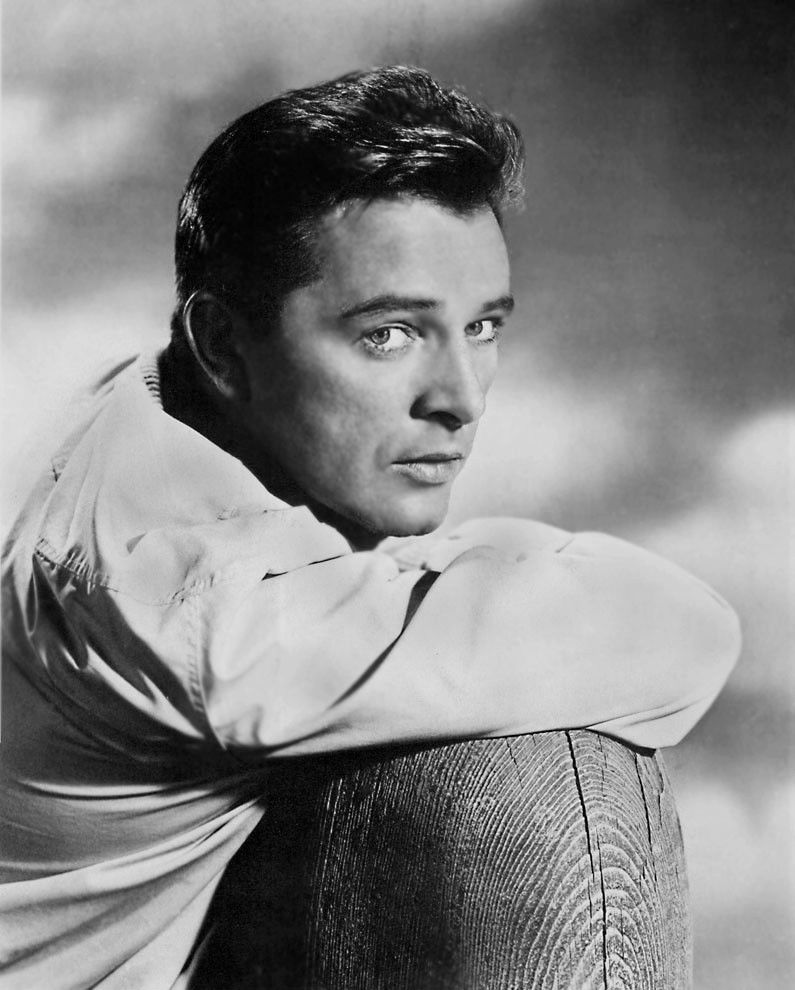
Richard Burton publicity photo for Prince of Players (1955)

Richard Burton (10 November 1925 – 5 August 1984) was a Welsh actor who had an extensive career primarily on stage and in film.

Known for his powerful presence and mellifluous baritone voice he starred in numerous notable films. He made his feature film debut in the British drama The Last Days of Dolwyn in 1949. Burton gained attention for his role as Philip Ashley, the protagonist in the romantic mystery My Cousin Rachel (1952) earning his first Academy Award nomination for Best Supporting Actor. Burton's stardom grew earning Academy Award for Best Actor nomination for portraying a history professor in a troubled marriage in the Mike Nichols directed drama Who's Afraid of Virginia Woolf? (1966) opposite his wife Elizabeth Taylor. He also starred in 10 other films opposite Taylor including The V.I.P.s (1963), Cleopatra (1963), The Sandpiper (1965), The Taming of the Shrew (1967), Doctor Faustus (1967), The Comedians (1967), Boom! (1968), Under Milk Wood (1971), Hammersmith is Out (1972).

Burton received further Oscar nominations for playing a Roman officer in the Biblical epic The Robe (1953), Thomas Becket in the historical drama Becket (1964), a British MI6 agent in spy thriller The Spy Who Came In from the Cold (1965), King Henry VIII in the historical drama Anne of the Thousand Days (1969), and a psychiatrist treating a young patient in psychological drama Equus (1977). During this time Burton also starred in Alexander the Great (1956), The Longest Day (1962), and The Night of the Iguana (1965), Wagner (1983). His final film role was in Nineteen Eighty-Four (1984).

On stage, Burton gained prominence as a Shakespearean actor acting in numerous works of William Shakespeare. He portrayed roles such as Prince Hal in Henry IV, Part 1 (1951) and Henry IV, Part 2 (1951), Henry V of England in Henry V (1951), Ferdinand in The Tempest (1951), Prince Hamlet in Hamlet (1953), Sir Toby Belch in Twelfth Night (1953), Gnaeus Marcius Coriolanus in Coriolanus (1953), and Othello in Othello (1955). Burton originated the role as King Arthur in the Lerner and Loewe musical Camelot from 1960 to 1961 acting opposite Julie Andrews on Broadway.

== Acting credits ==
=== Film ===
Filmography of Richard Burton
| Year | Film | Role | Director | Notes | Ref(s) |
|---|---|---|---|---|---|
| 1949 | The Last Days of Dolwyn | Gareth | Emlyn Williams | | |
| 1949 | Now Barabbas | Paddy | Gordon Parry | | |
| 1950 | Waterfront | Ben Satterthwaite | Michael Anderson | | |
| 1950 | The Woman with No Name | Nick Chamerd | Ladislao Vajda | | |
| 1951 | Green Grow the Rushes | Robert "Bob" Hammond | Derek N. Twist | | |
| 1952 | My Cousin Rachel | Philip Ashley | Henry Koster | | |
| 1953 | The Desert Rats | "Tammy" MacRoberts | Robert Wise | | |
| 1953 | The Robe | Marcellus Gallio | Henry Koster | | |
| 1954 | Thursday's Children | Narrator | Lindsay Anderson | Documentary film | |
| 1955 | Prince of Players | Edwin Booth | Philip Dunne | | |
| 1955 | The Rains of Ranchipur | Rama Safti | Jean Negulesco | | |
| 1956 | Alexander the Great | Alexander the Great | Robert Rossen | | |
| 1957 | Sea Wife | Biscuit | Bob McNaught | | |
| 1957 | Bitter Victory | Jimmy Leith | Nicholas Ray | | |
| 1959 | Look Back in Anger | Jimmy Porter | Tony Richardson | | |
| 1960 | Ice Palace | Zeb Kennedy | Vincent Sherman | | |
| 1960 | The Bramble Bush | Guy Montford | Daniel Petrie | | |
| 1962 | Dylan Thomas | Narrator | Jack Howells | Documentary film | |
| 1962 | The Longest Day | David Campbell | Ken Annakin, Andrew Marton, Bernhard Wicki, Gerd Oswald | | |
| 1963 | Cleopatra | Mark Antony | Joseph L. Mankiewicz | | |
| 1963 | The V.I.P.s | Paul Andros | Anthony Asquith | | |
| 1964 | Zulu | Narrator | Cy Endfield | | |
| 1964 | Becket | Thomas Becket | Peter Glenville | | |
| 1964 | The Night of the Iguana | T. Laurence Shannon | John Huston | | |
| 1965 | What's New Pussycat? | | Clive Donner | Guest appearance | |
| 1965 | The Sandpiper | Edward Hewitt | Vincente Minnelli | | |
| 1965 | The Spy Who Came In from the Cold | Alec Leamas | Martin Ritt | | |
| 1966 | Who's Afraid of Virginia Woolf? | George | Mike Nichols | | |
| 1966 | Florence: Days of Destruction | Narrator | Franco Zeffirelli | Documentary film | |
| 1967 | The Taming of the Shrew | Petruchio | Franco Zeffirelli | Also producer | |
| 1967 | Doctor Faustus | Doctor Faustus | Richard Burton, Nevill Coghill | Also producer | |
| 1967 | The Comedians | Brown | Peter Glenville | | |
| 1967 | The Comedians in Africa | Himself | Peter Glenville | Short subject made to promote The Comedians | |
| 1968 | Boom! | Chris Flanders | Joseph Losey | | |
| 1968 | Where Eagles Dare | Jonathan Smith | Brian G. Hutton | | |
| 1968 | Candy | McPhisto | Christian Marquand | | |
| 1969 | Staircase | Harry C. Leeds | Stanley Donen | | |
| 1969 | Anne of the Thousand Days | Henry VIII of England | Charles Jarrott | | |
| 1971 | Raid on Rommel | Alex Foster | Henry Hathaway | | |
| 1971 | Villain | Vic Dakin | Michael Tuchner | | |
| 1971 | Under Milk Wood | First Voice | Andrew Sinclair | | |
| 1972 | The Assassination of Trotsky | Leon Trotsky | Joseph Losey | | |
| 1972 | Hammersmith Is Out | Hammersmith | Peter Ustinov | | |
| 1972 | Bluebeard | Baron Kurt von Sepper | Edward Dmytryk | | |
| 1973 | Battle of Sutjeska | Josip Broz Tito | Stipe Delić | | |
| 1973 | Massacre in Rome | Herbert Kappler | George P. Cosmatos | | |
| 1974 | The Voyage | Cesare Braggi | Vittorio De Sica | | |
| 1974 | The Klansman | Breck Stancill | Terence Young | | |
| 1977 | Exorcist II: The Heretic | Philip Lamont | John Boorman | | |
| 1977 | Equus | Martin Dysart | Sidney Lumet | | |
| 1978 | The Medusa Touch | John Morlar | Jack Gold | | |
| 1978 | The Wild Geese | Allan Faulkner | Andrew V. McLaglen | | |
| 1978 | Absolution | Goddard | Anthony Page | | |
| 1979 | Breakthrough | Rolf Steiner | Andrew V. McLaglen | | |
| 1981 | Circle of Two | Ashley St. Clair | Jules Dassin | | |
| 1981 | Lovespell | Mark of Cornwall | Tom Donovan | | |
| 1983 | Wagner | Richard Wagner | Tony Palmer | | |
| 1983 | To the Ends of the Earth | Narrator | William Kronick | Documentary film | |
| 1984 | Nineteen Eighty-Four | O'Brien | Michael Radford | Posthumous release (final film role) | |

=== Television ===
Television appearances of Richard Burton
| Date | Programme | Role | Notes | Ref(s) |
|---|---|---|---|---|
| 1952 | Celanese Theatre | Mat Burke | Episode: "Anna Christie" | |
| 1958 | DuPont Show of the Month | Heathcliff | Episode: "Wuthering Heights" | |
| 1960 | Hallmark Hall of Fame | Caliban | Episode: "The Tempest" | |
| 1960 | A Subject of Scandal and Concern | George Holyoake | Television film by BBC Television | |
| 1961 | The Ed Sullivan Show | Himself | Episode: "Salute to Alan Jay Lerner and Frederick Loewe" | |
| 1961 | Camera Three | Himself | Episode: "A Child's Christmas in Wales" | |
| 1963 | The Ed Sullivan Show | Himself | Episode: "Richard Burton, Morecombe and Wise, Arthur Worsley, Dave Madden" | |
| 1969 | The Ed Sullivan Show | Himself | Episode: "The Swinging, Soulful Sixties" | |
| 1970 | Here's Lucy | Himself | Episode: "Lucy Meets the Burtons" | |
| 1971 | Mooch Goes to Hollywood | Narrator | Television film by Jim Backus — Jerry Devine Productions | |
| 1973 | Divorce His, Divorce Hers | Martin Reynolds | Television film by the American Broadcasting Company | |
| 1974 | The Merv Griffin Show | Himself | Episode: "May 15, 1974" | |
| 1974 | Film... | Himself | Episode: "Film '74 Special, Richard Burton: If it Stops, I'm Dead" | |
| 1974 | Hallmark Hall of Fame | Alec Harvey | Episode: "Brief Encounter" | |
| 1974 | Parkinson | Himself | Episode: "Richard Burton" | |
| 1974 | Hallmark Hall of Fame | Winston Churchill | Episode: "The Gathering Storm" | |
| 1977 | The Hollywood Greats | Himself | Episode: "Humphrey Bogart" | |
| 1977 | Film... | Himself | Episode: "Film 77 Episode 8" | |
| 1977 | Good Morning America | Himself | Episode: "October 11, 1977" | |
| 1977 | Good Morning America | Himself | Episode: "October 12, 1977" | |
| 1977 | Good Morning America | Himself | Episode: "October 13, 1977" | |
| 1977 | Dinah! | Himself | Episode: "October 17, 1977" | |
| 1977 | Dinah! | Himself | Episode: "November 18, 1977" | |
| 1978 | Good Morning America | Himself | Episode: "March 28, 1978" | |
| 1978 | Film... | Himself | Episode: "Film '78 Episode 11" | |
| 1979 | The Bob Hope Salute to 1920s and '30's | Himself | Television special | |
| 1981 | Good Morning America | Himself | Episode: "July 27, 1981" | |
| 1982 | Entertainment Tonight | Himself | Episode: "February 1, 1982" | |
| 1982 | Entertainment Tonight | Himself | Episode: "February 4, 1982" | |
| 1982 | Bob Hope's Star-Studded Spoof of the New TV Season, G-Rated, with Glamour, Glitter and Gags | Himself | Television special | |
| 1982 | The Fall Guy | Himself | Episode: "Reluctant Traveling Companion" | |
| 1983 | Great Performances | White Knight | Episode: "Alice in Wonderland" | |
| 1984 | Entertainment Tonight | Himself | Episode: "July 31, 1984" | |
| 1984 | Ellis Island | Phipps Ogden | Main role; 2 episodes | |

=== Theatre ===
Stage credits of Richard Burton
| Year | Show | Role | Director | Theatre | Ref(s) |
|---|---|---|---|---|---|
| 1943 | The Druid's Rest | Glen | Emlyn Williams | Royal Court Theatre, Liverpool | |
| 1944 | The Druid's Rest | Glen | Emlyn Williams | St Martin's Theatre, London | |
| 1944 | Measure for Measure | Angelo | Nevill Coghill | Christ Church, Oxford | |
| 1948 | Castle Anna | Hicks | Daphne Rye | Lyric Theatre, Hammersmith | |
| 1949 | The Lady's Not for Burning | Richard | John Gielgud / Esme Percy | Globe Theatre, London | |
| 1950 | The Boy With A Cart | Cuthman | John Gielgud | Lyric Theatre, Hammersmith | |
| 1950 | A Phoenix Too Frequent | Tegeus | Christopher Fry | Dolphin Theatre, Brighton | |
| 1950–1951 | The Lady's Not for Burning | Richard | John Gielgud | Bernard B. Jacobs Theatre, New York City | |
| 1951 | Henry IV, Part 1 | Prince Hal | Anthony Quayle / John Kidd | Royal Shakespeare Theatre, Stratford-upon-Avon | |
| 1951 | Henry IV, Part 2 | Prince Hal | Michael Redgrave | Royal Shakespeare Theatre, Stratford-upon-Avon | |
| 1951 | Henry V | Henry V of England | Anthony Quayle | Royal Shakespeare Theatre, Stratford-upon-Avon | |
| 1951 | The Tempest | Ferdinand | Michael Benthall | Royal Shakespeare Theatre, Stratford-upon-Avon | |
| 1951–1951 | Legend of Lovers | The Musician | Peter Ashmore | Gerald Schoenfeld Theatre, New York City | |
| 1952 | Montserrat | Montserrat | Noel Willman / Nigel Green | Lyric Theatre, Hammersmith | |
| 1953 | Hamlet | Prince Hamlet | Michael Benthall | The Assembly Hall, Edinburgh | |
| 1953–1954 | Hamlet | Prince Hamlet | Michael Benthall | The Old Vic, London | |
| 1953–1954 | King John | Philip of Cognac | George Devine | The Old Vic, London | |
| 1953–1954 | Twelfth Night | Sir Toby Belch | Denis Carey | The Old Vic, London | |
| 1953–1954 | Coriolanus | Gaius Marcius Coriolanus | Michael Benthall | The Old Vic, London | |
| 1953–1954 | The Tempest | Caliban | Robert Helpmann | The Old Vic, London | |
| 1955–1956 | Henry V | Henry V of England | Michael Benthall | The Old Vic, London | |
| 1955–1956 | Othello | Othello | Michael Benthall | The Old Vic, London | |
| 1957–1958 | Time Remembered | Albert | Albert Marre | Morosco Theatre, New York City | |
| 1960–1961 | Camelot | King Arthur | Moss Hart | Morosco Theatre, New York City | |
| 1964 | Richard Burton's Hamlet | Prince Hamlet | John Gielgud | Lunt-Fontanne Theatre, New York City | |
| 1966 | Doctor Faustus | Faustus | Nevill Coghill | Oxford Playhouse, Oxford | |
| 1976 | Equus | Martin Dysart | John Dexter | Plymouth Theatre, New York City | |
| 1980 | Camelot | King Arthur | Frank Dunlop | David H. Koch Theater, New York City | |
| 1983 | Private Lives | Elyot Chase | Milton Katselas | Lunt-Fontanne Theatre, New York City | |

== Radio ==
Selected radio broadcasts of Richard Burton
| Date | Programme | Ref(s) |
|---|---|---|
| 27 January 1945 | The Corn Is Green | |
| September 1948 | In Parenthesis | |
| 10 July 1949 | The Last Days of Dolwyn | |
| 7 November 1949 | Nightmare Abbey | |
| 20 November 1949 | New Judgement | |
| March 1950 | Hippolytus | |
| 1950 | The Lady's Not for Burning | |
| 1 May 1950 | Sea Flood | |
| 15 July 1951 | Men of Steel, the Birth of a Giant | |
| 19 September 1951 | Night Birds | |
| 13 October 1951 | Taffy was a Welshman | |
| November 1953 | Good for the Boy | |
| December 1953 | Younger Generation | |
| 13 January 1954 | Night Must Fall | |
| 25 January 1954 | Under Milk Wood | |
| 16 May 1954 | The Duchess of Malfi | |
| June 1954 | The Old Vic Comes North | |
| 22 April 1956 | Henry of Agincourt | |
| 14 May 1956 | The Dark Tower | |
| 11 October 1963 | Under Milk Wood | |
| 25 December 1965 | A Christmas Story | |
| 13 February 1977 – 9 August 1977 | Vivat Rex | |

== Discography ==
=== Albums ===
Album recordings by Richard Burton
| Year | Title | Label | Type | Ref(s) |
|---|---|---|---|---|
| 1954 | Homage to Dylan Thomas | Argo Records PLP 1060 | Solo | |
| 1954 | Under Milk Wood | Spoken Arts SA 791 SA 792, 791-792 | Cast Recording | |
| 1954 | The Rime of the Ancient Mariner | Argo Records RG 41 | Solo | |
| 1955 | Richard Burton Reads 15 Poems by Dylan Thomas | Argo Records SW 503 | Solo | |
| 1958 | Love Poems of John Donne | Caedmon Audio TC 1141 | Solo | |
| 1960 | Camelot | Columbia Masterworks KOL 5620 | Cast Recording | |
| 1961 | The Poetry of Thomas Hardy | Caedmon Audio TC 1140 | Solo | |
| 1962 | Coriolanus | Caedmon Audio SRS M 226 | Cast Recording | |
| 1964 | Richard Burton's Hamlet | Columbia Masterworks DOL 302 | Cast Recording | |
| 1964 | Famous Scenes From Sir John Gielgud's Production Of William Shakespeare's Hamlet | Columbia Masterworks OL 8020 | Cast Recording | |
| 1964 | The Night of the Iguana | MGM Records PR 4 | Cast Recording | |
| 1965 | The English Poets — Samuel Taylor Coleridge | Argo Records RG 438 | Solo | |
| 1966 | The Days of Wilfred Owen | Warner Bros. Records B 1635 | Solo | |
| 1969 | Doctor Faustus | His Master's Voice ALP 2270 | Cast Recording | |
| 1971 | The World of Dylan Thomas | Argo Records PA/A 166 | Cast Recording | |
| 1975 | The Little Prince | P.I.P. Records PIP 6813 | Cast Recording | |
| 1978 | A Personal Anthology | Argo Records ZDSW 714 | Solo | |
| 1978 | Jeff Wayne's Musical Version of The War of the Worlds | CBS Records S CBS 96000 | Cast Recording | |

=== Singles ===
Singles by Richard Burton
| Year | Title | Label | Billed as | Notes | Ref(s) |
|---|---|---|---|---|---|
| 1964 | "Married Man" | DRG Records DARC 2100/B | Richard Burton | Part of the Broadway musical Baker Street. | |

== See also ==
- List of awards and nominations received by Richard Burton

== Bibliography ==
- Alpert, Hollis (1986). Burton. New York City: G. P. Putnam's Sons. ISBN 978-0-399-13093-9.
- Armstrong, Stephen B. (11 July 2011). Andrew V. McLaglen: The Life and Hollywood Career. Jefferson, North Carolina: McFarland & Company. ISBN 978-0-7864-8670-0.
- Beck, Robert (2 September 2008). The Edward G. Robinson Encyclopedia. Jefferson, North Carolina: McFarland & Company. ISBN 978-1-4766-0666-8.
- Bragg, Melvyn (1988). Richard Burton: A Life. Boston: Little, Brown and Company. ISBN 978-0-316-10595-8.
- Burton, Alan; Chibnall, Steve (11 July 2013). Historical Dictionary of British Cinema. Lanham, Maryland: Scarecrow Press. ISBN 978-0-8108-8026-9.
- MacKenzie, S. P. (28 January 2016). The Battle of Britain on Screen: ?The Few? in British Film and Television Drama. New York City: Bloomsbury Publishing. ISBN 978-1-4742-2847-3.
