= List of awards and nominations received by Richard Burton =

Richard Burton awards and nominations
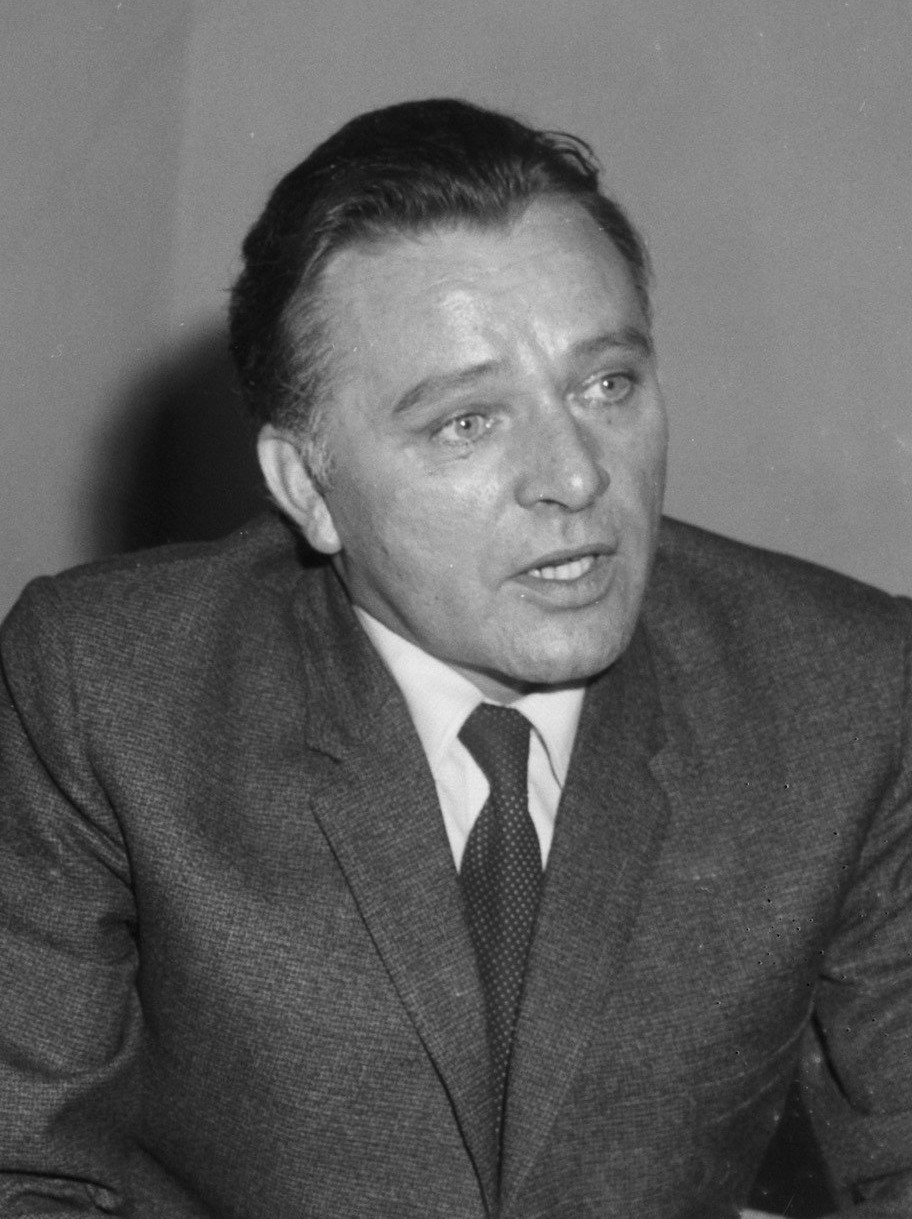
- Burton in 1965
Awards and nominations
Award	Wins	Nominations
Academy Awards	0	7
BAFTA Awards	1	3
Golden Globe Awards	2	8
Grammy Awards	1	3
Primetime Emmy Awards	0	1
Tony Awards	1	3

Totals (Note: Certain award groups do not simply award one winner. They acknowledge several different recipients, have runners-up, and have third place. Since this is a specific recognition and is different from losing an award, runner-up mentions are considered wins in this award tally. For simplification and to avoid errors, each award in this list has been presumed to have had a prior nomination.)
- Wins: 17
- Nominations: 28

Richard Burton was a noted Shakespearean actor of stage and screen and received numerous accolades including a British Academy Film Award, two Golden Globe Awards, a Grammy Award, and a Tony Award as well as nominations for seven Academy Awards and a Primetime Emmy Award.

Burton was nominated for seven Academy Awards for his roles as Philip Ashley, the protagonist in the romantic mystery My Cousin Rachel (1952), a Roman officer in the Biblical epic The Robe (1953), the title characterin the historical drama Becket (1964), a British MI6 agent in spy thriller The Spy Who Came In from the Cold (1965), a history professor in a troubled marriage in the drama Who's Afraid of Virginia Woolf? (1966), King Henry VIII in historical drama Anne of the Thousand Days (1969), and a psychiatrist treating a young patient in psychological drama Equus (1977).

For his roles on stage, he received the Tony Award for Best Actor in a Musical for his role as King Arthur in the original Broadway production of Camelot (1961). He was Tony-nominated for his roles in Time Remembered (1958), and Hamlet (1964). He won a Special Tony Award at the 1976.

== Major associations ==
=== Academy Awards ===
Year	Category	Nominated work	Result	Ref.
1952	Best Supporting Actor	My Cousin Rachel	Nominated	
1953	Best Actor	The Robe	Nominated	
1964	Best Actor	Becket	Nominated	
1965	Best Actor	The Spy Who Came In from the Cold	Nominated	
1966	Best Actor	Who's Afraid of Virginia Woolf?	Nominated	
1969	Best Actor	Anne of the Thousand Days	Nominated	
1977	Best Actor	Equus	Nominated	

=== BAFTA Awards ===
British Academy Film Awards
Year	Category	Nominated work	Result	Ref.
1959	Best British Actor	Look Back in Anger	Nominated	
1966	Best British Actor	The Spy Who Came In from the Cold	Won	
1966	Best British Actor	Who's Afraid of Virginia Woolf?	Won	
1967	Best British Actor	The Taming of the Shrew	Nominated	

=== Emmy Awards ===
Year	Category	Nominated work	Result	Ref.
1985	Outstanding Supporting Actor in a Limited Series or Special	Ellis Island	Nominated	

=== Golden Globe Awards ===
Year	Category	Nominated work	Result	Ref.
1952	New Star of the Year – Actor	My Cousin Rachel	Won	
1959	Best Actor – Motion Picture Drama	Look Back in Anger	Nominated	
1964	Best Actor – Motion Picture Drama	Becket	Nominated	
1966	Best Actor – Motion Picture Drama	Who's Afraid of Virginia Woolf?	Nominated	
1967	Best Actor – Motion Picture Musical or Comedy	The Taming of the Shrew	Nominated	
1969	Best Actor – Motion Picture Drama	Anne of the Thousand Days	Nominated	
1977	Best Actor – Motion Picture Drama	Equus	Won	

=== Grammy Awards ===
Year	Category	Nominated work	Result	Ref.
1965	Best Documentary, Spoken Word or Drama Recording	Richard Burton's Hamlet	Nominated	
1965	Best Documentary, Spoken Word or Drama Recording	Dialogue Highlights from Becket	Nominated	
1976	Best Recording for Children	The Little Prince (Album)	Won	

=== Tony Awards ===
Year	Category	Nominated work	Result	Ref.
1958	Best Actor in a Play	Time Remembered	Nominated	
1961	Best Actor in a Musical	Camelot	Won	
1964	Best Actor in a Play	Hamlet	Nominated	
1976	Special Tony Award		Honored	

== Miscellaneous accolades ==
=== Bambi Award ===
Year	Category	Nominated work	Result	Ref.
1966	Best International Actor	Who's Afraid of Virginia Woolf?	Won	

=== David di Donatello Award ===
Year	Category	Nominated work	Result	Ref.
1965	Best Foreign Actor	The Spy who Came from the Cold	Won	
1967	Best Foreign Actor	The Taming of the Shrew	Tied	

=== Laurel Awards ===
Year	Category	Nominated work	Result	Ref.
1964	Top Male Dramatic Performance	Becket	Won	
1965	Top Male Dramatic Performance	The Spy Who Came from the Cold	Won	
1966	Top Male Dramatic Performance	Who's Afraid of Virginia Woolf?	Won	

=== National Society of Film Critics ===
Year	Category	Nominated work	Result	Ref.
1966	Best Actor	Who's Afraid of Virginia Woolf?	2nd place	

=== New York Film Critics Circle ===
Year	Category	Nominated work	Result	Ref.
1966	Best Actor	Who's Afraid of Virginia Woolf?	2nd place	

=== Taormina Film Fest ===
Year	Category	Nominated work	Result	Ref.
1973	Best Actor	Massacre in Rome	Won	

=== Theatre World Award ===
Year	Category	Nominated work	Result	Ref.
1951	Theatre World Award	The Lady's Not for Burning	Won	

=== Valladolid International Film Festival ===
Year	Category	Nominated work	Result	Ref.
1984	Best Actor (shared with John Hurt)	Nineteen Eighty-Four	Won	

== See also ==
- Richard Burton on stage, screen, radio and record
