= Christopher Guard =

English actor

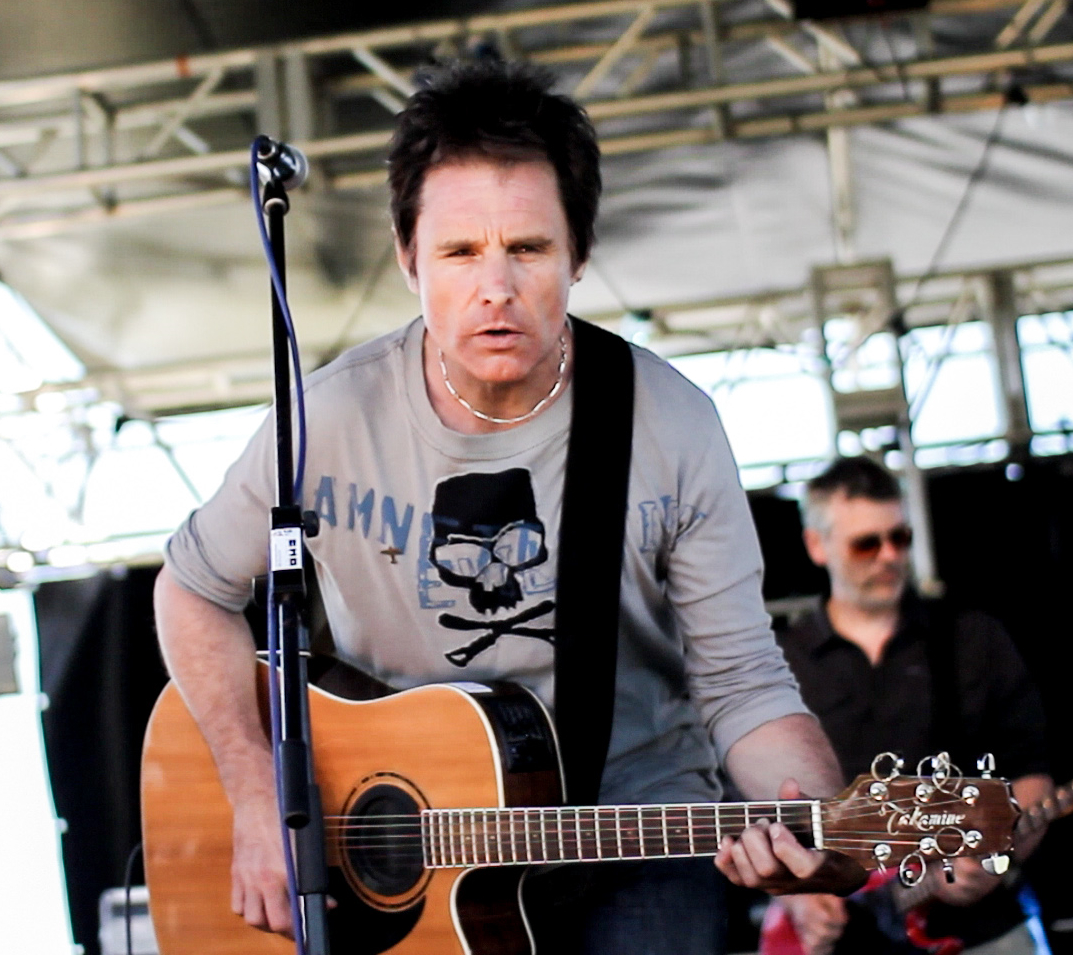
- Guard performing in 2012
- Born: 5 December 1953 (age 72); Hammersmith, London, England
- Occupation: Actor
- Years active: 1966–present
- Spouse: Lesley Dunlop (divorced)
- Partner: Cathy Shipton
- Children: 3
- Parent(s): Charlotte Mitchell (mother); Philip Guard (father)
- Relatives: Dominic Guard (brother); Candy Guard (sister); Pippa Guard (cousin)

Christopher Guard (born 5 December 1953) is an English actor, musician and artist. He is known for roles such as Jim Hawkins in Return to Treasure Island (1986), Bellboy in Doctor Who serial The Greatest Show in the Galaxy (1988), Marcellus in I, Claudius (1976), Marius in Les Misérables (1978), Ken Hodges in the medical drama Casualty (1993), and voicing Frodo Baggins in The Lord of the Rings (1978).

Guard has appeared in Memoirs of a Survivor (1981) and A Woman of Substance (1985). His first role on television was the young David Copperfield in the BBC's 1966 TV serial adaptation, followed by Pip in Great Expectations (1967). A long list of credits include appearances in Dixon of Dock Green, Z-Cars, Secret Army, Shoestring, The Professionals, Lovejoy, Bugs, Poirot, The Bill and Doctors. He has played roles in two works by Dennis Potter: Play For Today: Joe's Ark (1974) and Blackeyes (1989). He demonstrated his singing ability in the film version of Stephen Sondheim's A Little Night Music (1977) in the role of Henrik Egerman alongside Elizabeth Taylor. He played Ferdinand in the BBC Shakespeare production of The Tempest (opposite his cousin Pippa as Miranda) in 1980.

In recent years, Guard has worked on expanding his musical career and developing his artwork for private sale online.

== Early life ==
Guard was born in Hammersmith, London and educated at Latymer Upper School.

== Career ==
Guard's on-screen debut came aged 12 as the young David Copperfield in BBC television's 1966 serial adaptation of the Charles Dickens novel. Producer Campbell Logan and Director Joan Craft had failed to find a suitable young actor from a drama academy and started to enquire about children of actors. Guard said: "I never went to any kind of stage school... I went up once, twice, and three times [to Threshold House for auditions] – third time it was just me and one other boy and they chose me. The next thing I knew, there were four big, fat BBC scripts on the doormat and I was learning the lines and rehearsing in an old church hall and working with amazing people like Joss Ackland." Only one episode to feature Guard (episode 3, "A Long Journey") is known to exist.

Further television work followed, including an episode of Dixon of Dock Green and in 1967 he landed the role of young Pip in another BBC Dickens serial, Great Expectations, directed by Alan Bridges, who also directed Guard in a Play For Today called "Joe's Ark" written by Dennis Potter. In 1974, Guard became a member of the National Theatre at the age of 20.

Further roles in high-profile BBC TV productions followed, including Marcellus in I, Claudius (1976) and Marius in Les Misérables (1978). In 1978, Guard and his brother, Dominic both voiced characters in an animated film version of The Lord of the Rings (1978). Chris voiced Frodo Baggins and Dominic voiced Pippin.

The late seventies and early eighties were a busy time for Guard with appearances in Shoestring, The Professionals and leading roles in period costume dramas such as My Cousin Rachel (1983) by Daphne du Maurier and A Woman of Substance (1985) written by Barbara Taylor Bradford, Guard worked alongside Jenny Seagrove, Deborah Kerr and Liam Neeson.

The actor's next project was with Brian Blessed, playing the lead character of Jim Hawkins in Return to Treasure Island (1986). The 10-part miniseries was filmed in Wales, Spain and Jamaica and directed by Piers Haggard and Alex Kirby. It is a sequel to the Robert Louis Stevenson classic and again features Long John Silver.

Guard entered the world of science fiction for the role of Bellboy in the Doctor Who serial The Greatest Show in the Galaxy (1988). His character builds and repairs robotic clowns at the Psychic Circus. Guard considered Bellboy a victim: "All these things were happening to him. Although he has had power, the power is all kind of taken away from him. Ultimately, he turns his own creations, in a Frankenstein way, upon himself". The episodes were filmed in Dorset and at the BBC Elstree Centre using the car park to house the large circus top. Summing up the experience on location, Guard said "There was a vibe about the whole shoot. It was very hot out there...but it just felt good."

From September 1993, Guard played the role of Clinical Nurse Specialist Ken Hodges in long-running BBC drama, Casualty. The nurse left Holby after admitting he loved established character, Charlie Fairhead. Guard said about the character: "He's someone whose life is outside my experience, but we're not making any great statement by including a man who happens to be gay".

== Music ==
As a musician and songwriter Guard has written award-winning songs and his bands Leapfrogtown and What the Fox have played festivals supporting Toploader and venues such as The Troubadour and Ronnie Scott's Jazz Club. His song 'Attention Deficit Girl' won the Guild of International Songwriters Rock Award in 2004.

In 2001, Christopher composed a song to celebrate the promotion of Fulham to the Premier Division. The song, entitled 'Here to Stay' by his band Lucky Revolution, features lead vocals by his daughter Daisy and backing vocals by his daughter Rosie and partner, Cathy Shipton.

His songs have featured on radio, television and film. This included collaborating on Candy Guard's animated series, Pond Life for Channel 4 (1996 and 2000) and recently contributions to the soundtrack for the film 'Mercy' (2020), directed and written by Wendy Morgan.

== Indians in Moscow ==
In 1991, Stuart Walton and Pete Riches reformed the band, Indians in Moscow and recruited Guard as lead singer. Together they released an initial single, 'Wrong Love' (1991) and then recorded an album, 'Ten Days to Live' (1994) on Nemesis Records. Walton and Guard continued to work together as part of The Bloogs up until 2012 and then as Leapfrogtown.

== Art ==
Alongside his work in film and music Chris is an established artist. His work is inspired by nature and 'our strange and paradoxical relationship with it'. His clients include British and American actors and musicians.

== Family ==
Guard has two daughters from his marriage with Lesley Dunlop and one daughter with actress Cathy Shipton.

Christopher ran the London Marathon in 1995 in aid of the 'Save the Cottage Campaign' and in total he has run five marathons and many half-marathons supporting Leukemia Research and the British Heart Foundation and other charities.

He has been a vegetarian since childhood.

== Selected filmography ==
=== Film ===
Year	Title	Role	Director	Notes
1977	A Little Night Music	Erich Egerman	Harold Prince	
1978	The Lord of the Rings	Frodo	Ralph Bakshi	Voice
1981	Loophole	Cliff	John Quested	
1981	Memoirs of a Survivor	Gerald	David Gladwell	
2003	Butterfly	Boy's Brother	Corin Hardy	
2020	Mercy	Lawyer	Wendy Morgan	
2021	Swim	Z	Wendy Morgan	Pre-production

=== Television ===
Year	Title	Role	Director	Notes
1966	David Copperfield	Young David	Joan Craft	Serial (5 episodes)
1966	Dixon of Dock Green	Tommy Harris	David Askey	Series (1 episode)
1967	Great Expectations	Young Pip	Alan Bridges	Serial (3 episodes)
1971	Tom Brown's Schooldays	Darcy	Gareth Davies	
1972	Z-Cars	Michael	Gerald Blake	Series (1 episode)
1973	Vienna 1900	Hugo Heinold	Herbert Wise	
1974	Play For Today: Joe's Ark	John	Alan Bridges	
1976	I, Claudius	Marcellus	Herbert Wise	
1977	Secret Army	Peter Romsey	Paul Annett	
1977	The Duchess of Duke Street	John	Cyril Coke	
1978	Les Miserables	Marius	Glenn Jordan	TV movie
1979	Shoestring	Charles	Roger Tucker	
1979	You Me and Him	Conrad	Bernard Thompson	
1979	Malice Aforethought	Denny Bourne	Cyril Coke	
1980	Company and Co	Keith Farmer	Douglas Camfield	
1980	The Tempest	Ferdinand	John Gorrie	TV movie
1980	The Professionals	Tony	Chris Burt	
1981	John Diamond	John Diamond	Eric Davidson	TV movie
1981	Wilfred and Eileen	Wilfred	David Green	Serial (4 episodes)
1981	Jackanory	Storyteller	Nel Romano	'The Miller's Boy' (5 episodes)
1983	My Cousin Rachel	Philip Ashley	Brian Farnham	Serial (4 episodes)
1983	Bouncing Back		Colin Bucksey	TV Movie
1985	A Woman of Substance	Gerald Fairley	Don Sharp	
1985	The Tripods	Cognosc	Bob Blagden	
1986	Dead Man's Folly	Alec Legge	Clive Donner	
1986	Return to Treasure Island	Jim Hawkins	Piers Haggard	Series (10 episodes)
1988	Doctor Who: The Greatest Show in the Galaxy	Bellboy	Alan Wareing	Series (3 episodes)
1989	Blackeyes	Nigel Bennon	Dennis Potter	
1990	She-Wolf of London	Hatchard	Brian Grant	
1993	Casualty	Ken Hodges	Charles Beeson/Richard Bramall/Laura Sims/George Case/Matthew Evans	Series (7 episodes)
1994	Lifeboat	Jonathan Breem	Dewi Humphreys	
1994	Lovejoy	Jake	Ian White	'Somewhere - Over the Rainbow?'
1995	The Haunting of Helen Walker	Peter Quint	Tom McLoughlin	TV movie
1995	Jackanory	Storyteller		'Treasure Island' (5 episodes)
1996	Testament: The Bible in Animation	Jonathan	Gary Hurst	Voice
1997	Bugs	David Lance	John Stroud	
1998	The Bill	Phil Gough	Barbara Rennie	
2000	Poirot	Alton	Brian Farnham	
2000	The Worst Witch	Icy Stevens	Alex Kirby	
2001	Doctors	John Shephard	John Greening	

=== Theatre ===
Year	Title	Role	Director
1972	I and Albert	Prince Ernest	John Schlesinger
1972	Tom Brown's Schooldays	Flashman	Peter Coe
1974	Romeo and Juliet	Paris	Bill Bryden
1974	The Tempest	Francisco	Peter Hall
1974	Spring Awakening	Lammermeier	Bill Bryden
1975	The Taming of the Shrew	Lucentio	Mervyn Willis
1977	Filumena	Umberto	Franco Zeffirelli
1983	Custom of the Country		David Jones
