= My Cousin Rachel (2017 film) =

2017 film by Roger Michell

- Theatrical release poster
- Directed by: Roger Michell
- Written by: Roger Michell
- Based on: My Cousin Rachel; 1951 novel by Daphne du Maurier
- Produced by: Kevin Loader
- Starring: Rachel Weisz; Sam Claflin; Iain Glen; Holliday Grainger
- Cinematography: Mike Eley
- Edited by: Kristina Hetherington
- Music by: Rael Jones
- Production company: Free Range Films
- Distributed by: Fox Searchlight Pictures
- Release date: June 9, 2017
- Running time: 106 minutes
- Countries: United Kingdom; United States
- Language: English
- Box office: $9.2 million

My Cousin Rachel is a 2017 romantic drama film written and directed by Roger Michell. It is based on the 1951 novel of the same name by Daphne du Maurier. The film stars Rachel Weisz, Sam Claflin, Iain Glen, Holliday Grainger, and Pierfrancesco Favino. Its plot is about a young man in Cornwall who meets the widow of his older cousin, suspecting her of being responsible for his death.

My Cousin Rachel was released in the United States and United Kingdom on June 9, 2017, by Fox Searchlight Pictures. Weisz received positive reviews for her performance as the title character.

== Plot ==
In the 1830s, a young orphaned Philip is adopted by his older cousin Ambrose, who raises him as a son on his large estate in Cornwall. Philip grows up with no women in the household. When Philip is a young man, Ambrose travels to the sunnier climate of Florence for his health. Ambrose writes Philip that he has married their widowed, distant cousin Rachel in Florence. Later, Ambrose's letters grow increasingly paranoid, indicating he is becoming more ill and distrusts his doctors. Concerned, Philip travels to Italy, only to be informed by Rachel's friend Enrico Rainaldi that Ambrose has died and Rachel has left. Philip is convinced that Rachel caused Ambrose's death and vows revenge.

Under the terms of Ambrose's will, Philip will inherit the estate when he turns 25, and with no provision for Rachel. Philip returns to Cornwall and later learns Rachel has followed. She arrives at the estate and, while he vows to confront her, he becomes infatuated by the older woman's beauty and charm as they share the herbal tea she brews. They accompany each other on riding excursions and, no longer suspecting her of foul play, he throws an accusatory letter on the fire. Philip arranges a generous allowance for Rachel, which she is initially upset about, saying she did not come to Cornwall to beg for money. Rachel also reveals that Ambrose had fallen out of love with her after she had a miscarriage. Philip and Rachel's relationship grows deeper and more affectionate.

Rachel stays for Christmas celebrations and wears the family pearl necklace. Philip's godfather, Nick Kendall, learns Rachel has drastically overdrawn her bank account and warns Philip that Rachel was notorious in Florence for her extravagance and lust. Despite this, Philip gets a document drawn up to turn over the estate to Rachel as soon as he inherits it on his 25th birthday. His birthday arrives and he goes to her room at midnight and gives her the family jewels.

He asks her for what he lacks, and she draws him willingly to bed. The following morning, she reads the document giving her the entire estate and goes to Kendall to confirm its intent. When she returns, Philip takes her to the wood and they have sex again, but this time she does not welcome the intimacy. At dinner with friends, Philip declares that Rachel is to be his wife, which she denies. In private, she tells him she had sex with him merely as a form of thanks. He had viewed it as a confirmation they would marry, as this was what he lacked. They get into a violent argument and he grips her throat, after which Rachel professes fear of him.

Soon after, Philip falls ill and Rachel nurses him back to health. He discovers a letter from Ambrose claiming Rachel was poisoning him. Suspicious, Philip starts refusing her herbal tea, which she also made for Ambrose. He also finds that Rachel was secretly meeting her friend Rainaldi, whom he hates.

One day, Philip suggests Rachel ride along a clifftop path he knows is dangerous. When she leaves on horseback, Philip and Kendall's daughter, Louise, search Rachel's belongings for incriminating evidence, but only find letters showing her innocent intent. Philip realises he has misjudged Rachel and directed her to a dangerous path. He sets out to find her and discovers she has had a fatal fall while riding on the clifftop path.

Several years later, Philip, now married to Louise and a father of two, is tormented by Rachel's memory and never knowing whether she was innocent of his suspicions. He suffers severe headaches, which can be traced to the time of Rachel's visit.

== Cast ==
- Rachel Weisz as Rachel Ashley
- Sam Claflin as Philip
  - Louis Suc as 12-year-old Philip
  - Austin Taylor as 9-year-old Philip
- Iain Glen as Nick Kendall
- Holliday Grainger as Louise Kendall
- Tim Barlow as Seecombe
- Deano Mitchison as Ambrose
- Andrew Knott as Joshua
- Poppy Lee Friar as Mary Pascoe
- Katherine Pearce as Belinda Pascoe
- Tristram Davies as Wellington
- Andrew Havill as Parson Pascoe
- Vicki Pepperdine as Mrs. Pascoe
- Bobby Scott Freeman as John
- Harrie Hayes as Tess
- Pierfrancesco Favino as Enrico Rainaldi
- Simon Russell Beale as Couch

== Production ==
=== Development ===
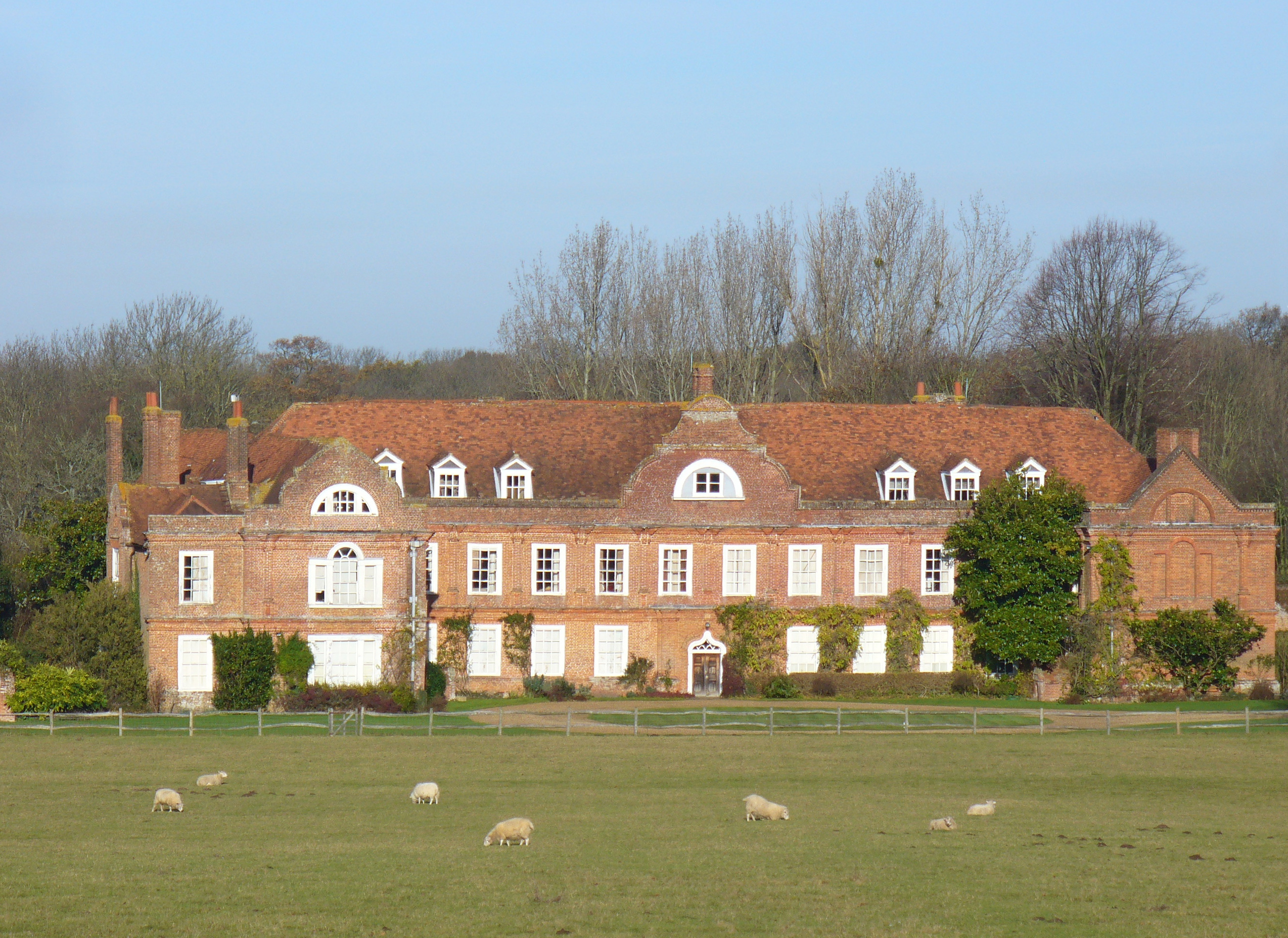
West Horsley Place was a filming location.

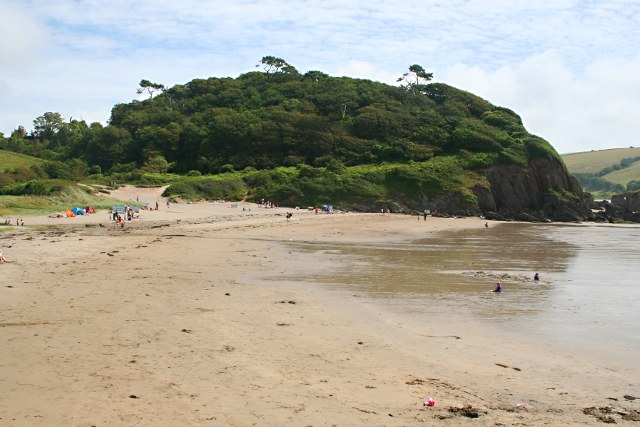
The Flete estate in Devon was used for beach scenes.

The film is one of several recent adaptations of Daphne du Maurier's work. In January 2015, Fox Searchlight secured Roger Michell to direct the film and write the screenplay. It is the first cinematic adaptation of My Cousin Rachel since the 1952 film of the same name.

While writing the screenplay, Michell estimated du Maurier intended the story to be set in the 1830s based on the absence of railways and presence of canals, and considered he had previously explored the time period with his Persuasion (1995), based on Jane Austen's work. A difference would be du Maurier's story involved more sex than Austen's.

=== Casting ===
In September 2015, it was announced Rachel Weisz was in talks to star in the film. She took the role, and envisioned the character as "sexually liberated". The same month, Sam Claflin joined the cast, stating he was interested because Philip was an ordinary, immature character, who was virginal until discovering Rachel.

In February 2016, Holliday Grainger joined the cast, followed by Iain Glen in March. Glen said that when he received the screenplay, he could see Michell had structured the mystery so that Kendall would believe one thing until another piece of evidence arose, and developed his performance accordingly.

=== Filming ===
Principal photography began on April 4, 2016, and lasted through the spring in England and Italy. With production designer Alice Normington, Michell selected filming locations in South Devon, Oxfordshire and Surrey, combining shots to create an idealistic setting. In Surrey, photography took place at West Horsley Place, a 16th-century building owned by Bamber Gascoigne. Michell said they selected the house for "the spirit of the place", which he described as "so alive and raw". The Flete estate in Devon was used for beach and riding scenes and shots of cliffs.

Weisz was costumed by Dinah Collin, who aimed for a fashion foreign to Cornwall, and consulted portraits to create an authentic classy appearance. The pearls used in the story were also made for the film, based on an 1835 painting. The crew decided on only two main dresses for the Rachel character, since she was not at home in Cornwall.

For the part, Weisz had to learn to ride a horse side-saddle, a feat made more challenging given her costume. The horse, previously used on the television production Game of Thrones, fell to the ground when it felt Weisz pull on its rein, as it had been trained to do for television, causing Weisz to fear for her safety.

== Release ==
In May 2016, two images from the film were released, featuring Claflin and Weisz. A trailer was released in January 2017, using a cover version of the song "Wicked Game" by Chris Isaak. The film was scheduled for a limited release on May 5, 2017. However, the date was pushed back to July 14, and later moved up to June 9, 2017.

In the U.S. on that date, it was released in 500 places. Filming location West Horsley Place also hosted a showing of the film in June, to support efforts to turn the building into an arts centre. In Region 1, 20th Century Fox released the film on DVD and Blu-ray in August, with commentary and documentary shorts.

== Reception ==
=== Box office ===
My Cousin Rachel grossed $2.7 million in North America and $6.4 million in other territories, for a worldwide gross of $9.2 million.

In its first weekend, My Cousin Rachel made £638,000 in 467 U.K. theatres, performing strongly in independently owned outlets. By July 3, My Cousin Rachel made £2.27 million in the U.K. In the U.S., it made $954,000 from 523 theatres in its first weekend.

=== Critical response ===
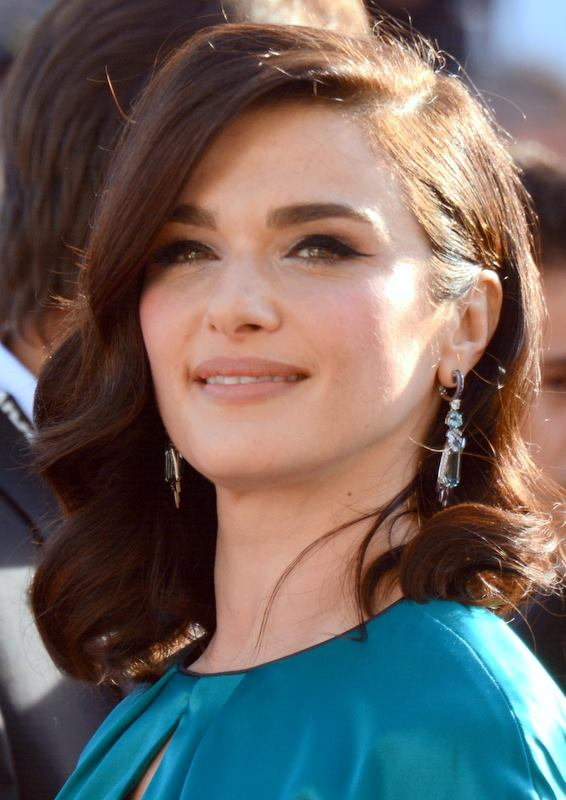
Critics cited Rachel Weisz for her performance.

On Rotten Tomatoes, the film has an approval rating of 76% based on 157 reviews, with an average rating of 6.6/10. The site's critical consensus reads, "Excellent cinematography and Rachel Weisz's entrancing performance keep My Cousin Rachel alluring despite a central mystery that's rather easily unlocked." On Metacritic, the film has average score of 63 out of 100, based on 34 critics, indicating "generally favourable reviews".

Mark Kermode awarded the film four stars in The Guardian, crediting Weisz for challenging the 1952 film's star Olivia de Havilland as the definitive Rachel and Michell for his period direction. In The Hollywood Reporter, Sheri Linden praised it as "Handsome and richly atmospheric". Kenneth Turan highlighted Weisz's performance and the romantic mystery of the adaptation in the Los Angeles Times. Ignatiy Vishnevetsky of The A.V. Club wrote that Michell was "making a welcome return to interesting movies" with this "mordant and fittingly morbid British film with a superbly cast Rachel Weisz." In Variety, Peter Debruge wrote Weisz's performance is "pure pleasure to watch". The Washington Post's Kristen Page-Kirby noted the film's emotions and the common experience of Philip's feelings of sexual entitlement. For The New York Times, Manohla Dargis wrote the scenery, cinematography and direction were consistently beautiful, but the film did not realize its full potential.

=== Accolades ===
In June 2017, Fox Searchlight Pictures and Create Advertising London shared a Golden Trailer Award for Best Foreign Romance for the trailer. At the British Independent Film Awards 2017, Dinah Collin was nominated for Best Costume Design.

Award	Date of ceremony	Category	Recipient(s)	Result	Ref(s)
British Independent Film Awards	November 1, 2017	Best Costume Design	Dinah Collin	Nominated	
Casting Society of America	2018	Feature Film Low Budget - Comedy or Drama	Fiona Weir	Nominated	
Evening Standard British Film Awards	February 8, 2018	Best Actress	Rachel Weisz	Longlisted	
Golden Trailer Award	2017	Best Foreign Romance	Fox Searchlight Pictures, Create Advertising London	Won	
World Soundtrack Awards	2017	Discovery of the Year	Rael Jones	Nominated	
