= Hell in the Pacific =

1968 film by John Boorman

- Theatrical release poster
- Directed by: John Boorman
- Written by: Reuben Bercovitch; Alexander Jacobs; Eric Bercovici
- Produced by: Reuben Bercovitch
- Starring: Lee Marvin; Toshiro Mifune
- Cinematography: Conrad Hall
- Edited by: Thomas Stanford
- Music by: Lalo Schifrin
- Production companies: Selmur Pictures; Henry G. Saperstein Enterprises
- Distributed by: Cinerama Releasing Corporation; Shochiku (Japan)
- Release dates: December 18, 1968 (United States); December 21, 1968 (Japan)
- Running time: 103 minutes
- Countries: United States; Japan
- Languages: English; Japanese
- Budget: $4,150,000
- Box office: $3,230,000

Hell in the Pacific is a 1968 wartime survival film directed by John Boorman and starring Lee Marvin and Toshiro Mifune, the only two actors in the film. Set in the Pacific War, it follows an American pilot and a Japanese naval officer who are stranded on the same uninhabited island. It is about the importance of human contact and the bond that can form between enemies if they lack external influences.

The film was released theatrically in the United States on December 18, 1968. It received mixed-to-positive reviews, but was a box-office bomb, earning $3.2 million on a $4.1 million budget. The disappointing performance of Hell in the Pacific was attributed to perceived similarities in premise to Frank Sinatra's None but the Brave (1965) and the film's abrupt ending, which failed to impress audiences.

== Plot ==
In the Pacific Theater of World War II, an Imperial Japanese Navy captain is marooned alone on an uninhabited island somewhere in the Pacific Ocean. One day, an American plane crash survival kit washes up on the shore, and he overhears an American military pilot, also recently stranded on the island, musing to himself in the jungle. The American hides from the Japanese's search and confronts him while he salvages the kit at his camp on the beach. Both men have visions of killing each other, but ultimately engage in a silent standoff over the Japanese's supply of drinking water, which the American loses as he is forced to retreat into the jungle. The Japanese sparks a fire to smoke out the American but encounters him again while checking his offshore fish trap; when negotiations over the water fail, the American uses the fire as a smoke screen to quickly steal some water before hiding atop a tree.

The next day, the American tries to steal more water for his canteen, but is caught and falls on the reservoir, destroying it. The American continues to torment the Japanese, destroying his fish trap, stealing his food, ringing his canteen like a bell, and throwing loose bullets on his fire pit. After urinating on the Japanese from the cliff above, the American and Japanese prepare to confront each other, but the American collapses from dehydration and is caught; the Japanese binds his arms to a log and makes him walk back and forth in the sand. Eventually, the American escapes and binds the Japanese to the log for the same punishment. After getting frustrated with their language barrier and the Japanese's use of resources, the American cuts the Japanese loose and tasks him with cooking; they continue to antagonize each other, but share chores and resources and stop trying to harm each other.

Later, the American notices the Japanese building a small raft and scolds him for stealing "his" log for its construction, before admitting he was upset that the Japanese hid it from him and offering that they build a better one together. They argue over the design, but eventually cooperate to build a large raft from the bamboo on a nearby hill. After setting sail and overcoming the strong waves of the reef, they hit open water.

After days at sea, they come upon a small archipelago and find a ruined military base. The Japanese recognizes it as a Japanese base and goes ahead to scout the area, but the American spots U.S.-marked field ration packaging and runs after him, pleading with any American soldiers present to hold fire and not harm his "friend". Both soon realize the base is completely abandoned and scavenge for supplies, finding shaving tools, alcohol, cigarettes, and magazines.

That night, the American and the Japanese shave, drink together, sing songs, and share stories despite their language barrier. As the American presses him on whether the Japanese believe in God, the Japanese reads a copy of Life magazine and is horrified to see graphic photos of dead and imprisoned Japanese soldiers. They begin to argue, unable to understand what either of them are angry about, as the sound of shelling begins in the distance. Now no longer friends, the American retrieves a webbing pack while the Japanese dresses himself in a Japanese military uniform, and the two share a final solemn look before silently departing in opposite directions.

=== Alternate ending ===
The later releases of Hell in the Pacific outside the U.S. featured an alternate ending that was made by the producers without Boorman's input. In this ending, the shelling heard while the American and Japanese argue grows increasingly louder and continues after the American kicks over their fire pit; as the Japanese turns to get dressed, a shell hits the building they are in and destroys it, killing them both.

== Cast ==
- Lee Marvin as American Pilot
- Toshirō Mifune as Captain Tsuruhiko Kuroda

== Production and release ==
The film contains little dialogue, and much like the thematically-similar None but the Brave (1965), the dialogue is not dubbed or subtitled, authentically portraying the frustration of restricted communication between the Japanese- and English-speaker. The film was entirely shot in the Rock Islands of Palau in the north Pacific Ocean, near the Philippines in the Philippine Sea.

The film was originally released with the actors solemnly walking away from one another. When it opened in Britain, the producers changed it with an abrupt ending in which a random shell strikes their building, killing them both. Boorman was surprised by the change, which he was not informed of, and said he "hated it", viewing it as too cynical for them to have gone through everything just to be killed at the end. The ending with the shelling was the version shown in Japan.

Both actors served for their respective countries during World War II. Marvin, who was in the United States Marine Corps, was wounded and received the Purple Heart during the Battle of Saipan in 1944. Mifune served in the Imperial Japanese Army Air Service.

=== Box office ===
The film earned rentals of $1.33 million in North America and $1.9 million elsewhere. Because of the high costs involved, by 1973 the movie had recorded a loss of $4,115,000, making it one of the biggest money losers in the short history of ABC films.

== Reception ==
Toshiro Mifune also took on foreign assignments, but few did him justice. It was only John Boorman's Hell in the Pacific that captured something of his range, humour and power.

— British Film Institute

On review aggregator Rotten Tomatoes, 67% of 18 critics gave the film a positive review. A.H. Weiler of The New York Times wrote, "[The film] grapples with the arresting relationships of character, communication and survival, but succeeds only fitfully in dramatically projecting these elemental qualities."

Kong: Skull Island (2017) director Jordan Vogt-Roberts praised Hell in the Pacific and said it inspired his film's opening scene, where a Japanese and an American become stranded on the same island and attempt to fight to the death before being interrupted.

== See also ==
- Enemy Mine, a 1985 film with a similar plot in a space war setting
- Into the White (2012)
- List of American films of 1968
