= Reuben Bercovitch =

- Born: July 18, 1923; Brooklyn, New York City, U.S.
- Died: November 14, 2020 (aged 97); Covina, California, U.S.
- Education: Columbia University
- Occupations: Screenwriter; film producer; novelist
- Years active: 1948–2004
- Spouse: Blanche (m. 1947)
- Children: 4
- Military career
- Allegiance: United States
- Service years: 1943–1946
- Conflicts: World War II

Reuben Bercovitch (July 18, 1923 – November 14, 2020) was an American screenwriter, film producer, and novelist. His credits included Frankenstein vs. Baragon, Invasion of Astro-Monster (both 1965), The War of the Gargantuas, What's Up, Tiger Lily? (both 1966), Hell in the Pacific (1968), and Out of Season (1975). Later in his career, he wrote three novels, with his full-length debut, Hasen (1978), earning the PEN/Hemingway Award for Debut Novel. A World War II veteran, his experiences in the war, including the liberation of Dachau concentration camp, influenced his literary work.

== Biography ==
Bercovitch was born on July 18, 1923, in the Brooklyn borough of New York City. His father ran a tailoring and dry-cleaning business. As a child, Bercovitch enjoyed building model airplanes and playing with an Erector Set. He attended Thomas Jefferson High School in Brooklyn before moving to Los Angeles in 1942, where he briefly worked as a riveter at Lockheed until he was drafted into the U.S. Army in 1943.

During World War II, Bercovitch served in the 20th Armored Division, 412th Armored Field Artillery Battalion, driving gasoline tankers under General George S. Patton's command for a period. He later trained at Indiana University before deploying to Europe in early 1945. Rising to the rank of technical sergeant by his 1946 discharge, he was part of the unit that liberated Dachau concentration camp. This experience left a lasting impact on him and later inspired his novel Hasen. Bercovitch narrowly escaped deployment to the planned invasion of Japan, which he believed would have been catastrophic for his unit, due to the war's end following the atomic bombings of Hiroshima and Nagasaki. He remained connected to his wartime comrades, attending reunions of the 20th Armored Division throughout his life.

After the war, he studied at Columbia University’s School of Business via the G.I. Bill and became a certified public accountant. In 1948, he joined his uncle's accounting firm in Beverly Hills before transitioning to the entertainment industry. By the early 1950s, he worked at the William Morris Agency, where he helped develop their television division and collaborated on projects involving emerging stars like Elvis Presley.

In the 1950s, Bercovitch entered film production through a connection with Henry G. Saperstein at United Productions of America, then known for Mr. Magoo cartoons and merchandising. This led to a partnership with Toho via their U.S. attorney, Paul Schreibman. During the 1960s, Bercovitch wrote and produced for Toho's kaiju films, including Frankenstein vs. Baragon (1965), Invasion of Astro-Monster (1965), and The War of the Gargantuas (1966). He also served as executive producer for Woody Allen's What's Up, Tiger Lily? (1966) and wrote and produced John Boorman's Hell in the Pacific (1968). In 1975, Bercovitch joined Lorimar Productions and produced Out of Season. He later worked with Tom Laughlin on Billy Jack projects but parted ways over creative and distribution disagreements, notably advising against Billy Jack Goes to Washington (1977), which flopped commercially. By his mid-60s, Bercovitch became semi-retired, working independently and maintaining a low-profile approach to his career, as noted by his family.

In his later years, Bercovitch turned to novel writing, publishing three books. His first full-length one, Hasen (1978), drew from his Dachau experiences, depicting two boys surviving near a concentration camp, and won the PEN/Hemingway Award for Debut Novel. His second novel, Odette (1970s), explored a romance between an Indian man and an American woman. His final work, The Snow Pit (2004), a semi-autobiographical tale set in wartime Nebraska, examined young love and community bonds strained by war. His wife, Blanche, supported his writing by typing manuscripts manually, as he avoided computers.

Bercovitch met his wife, Blanche, in their early teens through a Brooklyn Jewish scout group with progressive leanings. They married in January 1947 after his military service and had four sons: Stephen, Fred, Saul, and Marc. Blanche, a sociology graduate from Brooklyn College, worked with veterans at the Jewish Federation. The couple relocated to California in 1948, enjoying a memorable train journey with a stop at the Grand Canyon. Their travels included multiple visits to Japan, where they befriended actor Toshiro Mifune, who gifted them a rare Akita puppy, possibly of Imperial lineage, one of the first in the U.S. They also traveled to Palau, Britain, Italy, France, and various U.S. cities. Bercovitch was an avid reader of history and admired Ernest Hemingway but avoided most fiction.

Bercovitch died at Malinow and Silverman funeral home in Covina, California, on November 14, 2020, at the age of 97.
