= Out of Season (1975 film) =

1975 film

- 1975 theatrical poster
- Directed by: Alan Bridges
- Written by: Eric Bercovici; Reuben Bercovitch
- Produced by: Eric Bercovici; Reuben Bercovitch
- Starring: Cliff Robertson; Vanessa Redgrave; Susan George
- Cinematography: Arthur Ibbetson
- Edited by: Peter Weatherley
- Music by: John Cameron
- Production company: Lorimar Productions
- Distributed by: EMI Film Distributors
- Release date: June 1975
- Running time: 90 minutes
- Country: United Kingdom
- Language: English

Out of Season is a 1975 British drama film directed by Alan Bridges, and starring Vanessa Redgrave, Susan George, and Cliff Robertson. The film follows a mother-daughter duo who run a hotel, before they are visited by a former flame of the mother's. Both women begin competing for his attention.

It was produced by Lorimar Productions and entered into the 25th Berlin International Film Festival.

== Plot ==
Joe Turner returns to a picturesque seaside resort twenty years after he walked out from a romantic relationship with Ann, who still owns and runs the same hotel where he knew her, but she now has a grown daughter named Joanna. Joe and Ann start to renew their relationship, but with interference from Joanna, who flirts with Joe from the moment she meets him and competes with her mother for his attention.

Days into Joe's return, an argument with Ann leads to him leaving, but Joanna follows him in the car and asks him to stay. He ignores her, but late that night he returns to the hotel. In his bedroom, Joe unexpectedly discovers one of the women [whose face is not shown] naked in bed and offering herself to him, and he wordlessly joins her. The following morning, Joe joins mother and daughter for breakfast in buoyant mood, and he and Ann continue to revive their relationship, but the evening ends with Joanna announcing that she had been with Joe the previous night. Joe says nothing, but Ann responds by physically dragging Joanna upstairs and locking her in her bedroom. Joe agrees with Ann that he will leave for a few weeks, to attend to some business he has in London, and then come back.

After Ann goes to bed, Joanna escapes out of her window and lets herself back into the hotel, where she finds a drunk Joe sitting alone downstairs and flirts with him. Despite his initial lack of interest, she ignores his attempts to send her back to her room, and eventually he succumbs to her advances and they have sex. Ann catches them in the act and coldly tells Joe that she had previously lied to him when she said Joanna's father was dead, and says there was never anyone else after him, implying that Joe is Joanna's father.

The next day, one of the women is seen leaving the resort by train, while the other woman remains with Joe at the hotel, but their faces are not shown. Joe talks about fixing up the place before next summer season, but the woman says nothing as he sits down to play cards with her.

== Cast ==
- Vanessa Redgrave as Ann
- Cliff Robertson as Joe Turner
- Susan George as Joanna
- Edward Evans as Charlie
- Frank Jarvis as Postman

== Production ==
=== Background ===
The film was originally titled Winter Rates and was announced by Daily Variety in 1974 to be starring Redgrave and Oliver Reed. It had an expected budget of approximately $500,000.

=== Filming ===
Out of Season was filmed at Elstree Studios in Borehamwood, Hertfordshire, and on location in Dorset, primarily at the Isle of Portland, including the village of Chiswell, as well as Lulworth Cove. The sets were designed by the art director Robert Jones. The on location footage was shot over the course of five days in November 1974.

== Reception ==
Variety said: "Virtually a three-hander, Out of Season boasts top-notch performances by Redgrave, Robertson and George, a taut script and first-rate direction. Bridges displays his ability to develop and hold obsessive situations, all hints and innuendos, and this ping pong match of the affections often has the suspense of a whodunit." TV Guide awarded the film three stars, commenting: "A small cast in a tight environment makes this film look like exactly what it is - a stage play adapted for the screen." Time Out noted: "The super-smooth Alan Bridges finds himself landed with an impossible project. The dire script wrings every possible cliché out of the situation. The biggest mystery is why this stagey stuff was filmed at all, and why a cast of this calibre should have bothered."

Texas Monthly said: "Out of Season cannot be tolerated at any time of year. If ever a project called for an executioner, this was it, and the presence of Redgrave, Robertson, George and the underrated director Alan Bridges, should not fool anyone into thinking that this frail mash note to father-daughter sex is a Certified Art Film." Film Review Digest Annual wrote: "With Out of Season, it's a shame that so much tender loving care was expended on so uninteresting a film. Whatever it was in Reuben Bercovitch and Eric Bercovici's wan story that intrigued England's gifted Alan Bridges fails to come across."
