= My Cousin Rachel =

1951 novel by Daphne du Maurier

- First US edition
- Author: Daphne du Maurier
- Language: English
- Genre: Gothic novel
- Publisher: Victor Gollancz (UK); Doubleday (US)
- Publication date: 1951
- Publication place: United Kingdom
- Media type: Print (hardback and paperback)
- OCLC: 70160575

My Cousin Rachel is a Gothic novel written by English author Daphne du Maurier, published in 1951. Bearing thematic similarities to her earlier and more famous novel Rebecca, it is a mystery-romance, set primarily on a large estate in Cornwall.

The novel involves a young man, Philip Ashley, who becomes infatuated with his cousin Ambrose's widow Rachel. When Rachel comes to Cornwall to stay with him, he hands over the entire estate to her, but later becomes suspicious that she is trying to poison him.

The story has its origins in a portrait of Rachel Carew at Antony House in Cornwall, which du Maurier saw and took as inspiration.

== Synopsis ==
In the 1830s, 43-year-old Ambrose Ashley is the owner of a large country estate on the Cornish coast and has been guardian to his orphaned 24-year-old cousin Philip since the latter was 18 months old. Philip grows up with a complete absence of women in the household. After schooling and university, Philip returns to live on the estate, where he is very happy. Life is good apart from health problems that require Ambrose to spend the winter in warmer climates. As the damp weather approaches, Ambrose sets off for his third winter abroad, to Italy, and leaves Philip to run the estate.

Philip receives regular letters from Ambrose in Italy. Ambrose writes that he has met a cousin of theirs called Rachel – the widowed Contessa Sangalletti – in Florence. In the spring, Ambrose says that he and Rachel are married and have no immediate plans to return to Cornwall. Gradually, the tone of Ambrose's correspondence changes. He complains of the sun, the stuffy atmosphere of the Villa Sangalletti, and terrible headaches. In a letter that reaches Philip in July, Ambrose says that a friend of Rachel named Rainaldi has recommended that Ambrose see a different doctor. Ambrose says he can trust no one and claims that Rachel watches him constantly.

Philip discusses the letter with his godfather Nick Kendall, who suggests that Ambrose may be suffering from a brain tumour. Philip travels to Italy and reaches the Villa Sangalletti, where he learns that Ambrose is dead and Rachel has left. When Philip returns to Cornwall, Nick tells him that he has received a communication from Rainaldi, containing two pieces of information: The death certificate confirms that Ambrose's cause of death was a brain tumour, and as Ambrose had never changed his will in Rachel's favour, Philip is still heir to the estate and will inherit all when he turns 25. Philip does not trust Rachel, believing she was responsible for Ambrose's death.

Two weeks later, Nick receives word from Rachel that she has arrived by boat at Plymouth. Philip invites her to stay with him, initially to confront her. With little experience of women, he becomes infatuated by the older woman's beauty and charm as they share the herbal tea she brews. He throws an accusatory letter from Ambrose, which describes Rachel as his "torment", into the fire.

Philip arranges for Rachel to receive a generous allowance, after she suggests she could earn money by teaching Italian. Rachel also reveals that Ambrose had fallen out of love with her after she had a miscarriage. Their relationship grows deeper and more affectionate.

Philip discovers a letter from Ambrose, written three months before his death. In it, Ambrose tells Philip about his illness and talks of Rachel's recklessness with money and her habit of turning to Rainaldi rather than him. Finally, he wonders if they are trying to poison him, and he asks Philip to come to see him. Rachel later shows Philip an unsigned will that Ambrose wrote, in which he leaves his property to Rachel. Philip begins to trust Rachel again.

Rachel stays for the Christmas celebrations and wears the family pearl necklace. Philip's godfather Nick Kendall learns that she has drastically overdrawn her bank account and warns Philip that Rachel was notorious in Florence for her extravagance and lust. Despite this, Philip gets a document drawn up to turn over the estate to Rachel as soon as he inherits it on his 25th birthday.

His birthday arrives and he goes to her room at midnight and gives her the family jewels. She asks him: "Is there nothing else you want? Tell me, and you shall have it. Anything you ask” and he responds: “I know now what I lack.” She takes him to her bed and they make love. The next day, Philip announces that he and Rachel are getting married, but she denies this in front of friends, and later tells him sleeping with him was her way of thanking him. He had believed it sealed their engagement.

Not long afterward, Philip falls ill for many weeks, and Rachel nurses him. Philip searches her room and finds the seeds of the poisonous laburnum tree in a packet, a tree that he had noticed in the Italian villa. When he is well enough to go outside, he finds that the terraced gardens are complete and that work has begun on a sunken garden. The foreman tells Philip that the bridge over the garden is a framework and will not bear any weight.

Philip suspects that Rachel tried to poison him, and with Louise Kendall's help, searches her room. They find nothing to incriminate Rachel and wonder if they are misjudging her. Meanwhile, Rachel has walked to the terraced garden and stepped onto the bridge over the sunken garden. Philip knew where she was going, but did not warn her of the danger. Philip finds her broken body among the timber and stone. He takes her in his arms, and she looks at him, calling him Ambrose before she dies.

== Adaptations ==
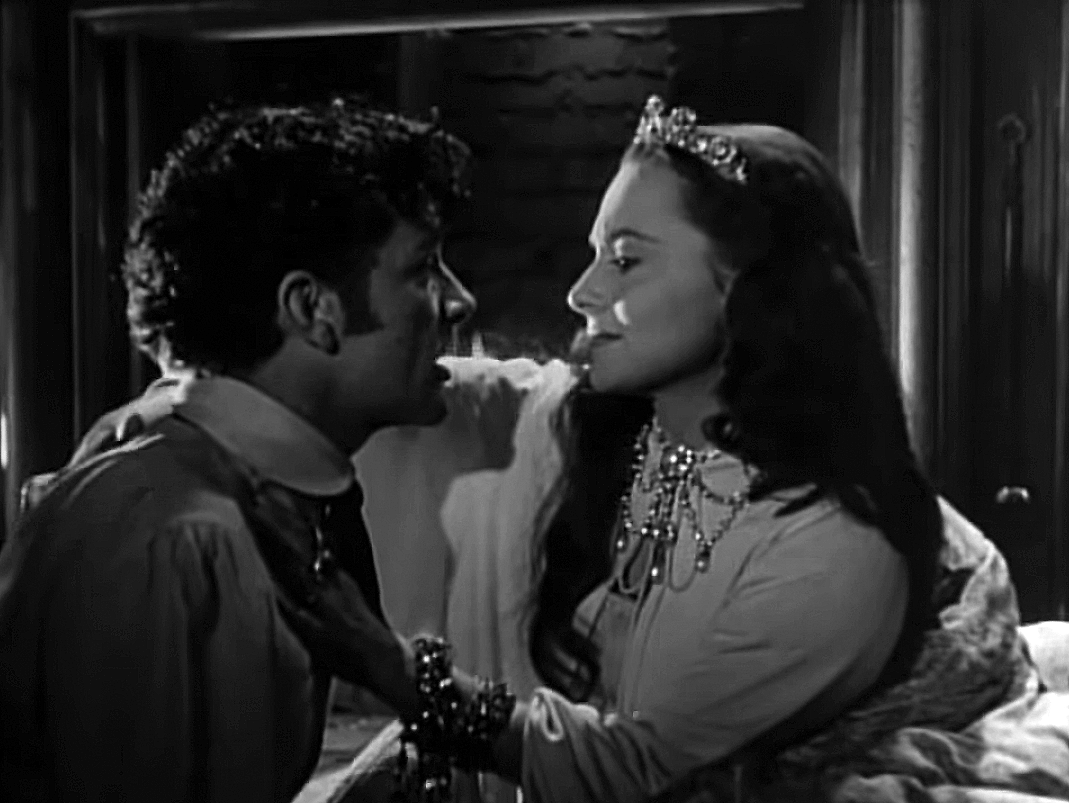
Richard Burton and Olivia de Havilland in the first film adaptation My Cousin Rachel

The first film adaptation, Henry Koster's My Cousin Rachel starring Richard Burton and Olivia de Havilland, was released in 1952. Du Maurier and original director George Cukor reviewed a screenplay draft and found it unfaithful to the novel, with du Maurier declaring it "Quite desperate." Nevertheless, critics Bosley Crowther and Leonard Maltin stated it was a worthy adaptation.

A four-part television adaptation, starring Christopher Guard and Geraldine Chaplin, was broadcast in 1983. Professor Nina Auerbach judged it as "superficially" more faithful, including a more complex treatment of Rachel.

In 1953, Lux Radio Broadcasts presented My Cousin Rachel with Olivia De Havilland and Ron Randell as Rachel and Philip.

A radio adaptation of My Cousin Rachel by BBC Radio 4, aired on 4 December 1993 (19:50), starring Francesca Annis and Adam Godley. It was dramatised by Bryony Lavery and directed by Claire Grove. It aired again on 7 October 2023 on Radio 4's sister channel Radio 4 extra.

Another radio adaptation of My Cousin Rachel by BBC Radio 4, first aired in April 2011, starring Damian Lewis and Lia Williams. It aired again May 2013 on Radio 4's sister channel Radio 4 extra.

On 17 April 2012, a dramatic adaptation by Joseph O’Connor of My Cousin Rachel premièred at the Gate Theatre, Dublin, starring Hannah Yelland as Rachel.

Roger Michell's My Cousin Rachel, starring Rachel Weisz, Sam Claflin and Iain Glen, was released in June 2017.

== Legacy ==
The novel is commemorated by the My Cousin Rachel Walk, which stretches 5 mi (8.0 km) in the Barton lands in Cornwall, where some of the action in the novel takes place.
