= My Cousin Rachel (TV series) =

- Genre: Mystery
- Based on: My Cousin Rachel by Daphne du Maurier
- Written by: Hugh Whitemore
- Directed by: Brian Farnham
- Starring: Geraldine Chaplin; Christopher Guard
- Composer: Patrick Gowers
- Country of origin: United Kingdom
- Original language: English
- No. of series: 1
- No. of episodes: 4

Production
- Producer: Richard Beynon
- Running time: 55 minutes
- Production company: BBC

Original release
- Network: BBC Two
- Release: 7 March – 28 March 1983

My Cousin Rachel is a British mystery television series adapted from the novel of the same title by Daphne du Maurier. It first aired on BBC 2 in four parts between 7 and 28 March 1983.

== Plot synopsis ==
Philip Ashley’s cousin and guardian Ambrose has mysteriously died in Italy. Philip distrusts the diagnosis of a brain tumor due to letters from Ambrose describing suspicions that Rachel and her attorney Rainalidi are trying to poison him. Ambrose had not made a new will upon his marriage to Rachel, leaving Philip the heir to the large estate. When Rachel arrives in Cornwall, Philip becomes enamoured with her despite his misgivings. He makes preparations to transfer the estate to Rachel and, encouraged by her behaviour, assumes they will be married. Rachel rejects this, claiming he has misunderstood, and Philip falls ill. Rachel nurses him back to health and when recovered, Philip suspects that she poisoned him. He searches her room looking for evidence. Finding none, he realizes he has misjudged Rachel and also realizes he has failed to warn her of a dangerous bridge in the garden. He finds her broken body under the collapsed bridge.

== Cast ==
- Geraldine Chaplin as Contessa Rachel Sangalletti
- Christopher Guard as Philip Ashley
- Charles Kay as Rainaldi
- Amanda Kirby as Louise Kendall
- Bert Parnaby as Seecombe
- John Shrapnel as Ambrose Ashley
- John Stratton as Nick Kendall
- Keith Marsh as Reverend Pascoe
- Michael Mellinger as Giuseppe
- John Bryans as Mr Couch
- Esmond Knight as Sam Bates

== Reception ==
In a 1985 review, John J. O'Connor of The New York Times commended the script and Chaplin's performance and the direction, noting it "captures the special Cornish atmosphere of the piece perfectly." O’Connor wrote "The problem with this psychological study is that dramatically it has no clearly defined resolution." He summarized the series as "a fairly absorbing treatment" but warned those looking for a "tidy" ending would be disappointed.

== Bibliography ==
- Baskin, Ellen. Serials on British Television, 1950-1994. Scolar Press, 1996.
