= Variation on a Theme (play) =

1958 play by Terence Rattigan

First edition, Hamish Hamilton, London, 1958

Variation on a Theme is a 1958 play by the British writer Terence Rattigan. It is a reworking of Alexandre Dumas, fils's nineteenth century novel and subsequent play La Dame aux Camélias.

== Original production ==
Directed by John Gielgud, the play opened (after a pre-London tour), at the Globe Theatre, London, on 8 May 1958, with the following cast:

- Hettie - Jean Anderson
- Rose - Margaret Leighton
- Ron - Jeremy Brett
- Kurt - George Pravda
- Fiona - Felicity Ross
- Adrian - Lawrence Dalzell
- Mona - Mavis Villiers
- Sam - Michael Goodliffe

== Reception ==
While not received well by the critics, the play ran for 132 performances. Kenneth Tynan wrote in The Observer:

"As far as I could see the star of the show was Norman Hartnell, from whose contributions – a white diamanté sack, a shocking-pink cocktail dress in pleated chiffon, a casual ensemble of blouse and pedal-pushing slacks, and a two-tiered ball-gown in navy-blue pebble-crèpe – the lean extremities of Margaret Leighton nervously protuded [sic]."

== 1966 TV adaptation ==
The play was adapted for British television in 1966.

=== Cast ===
- Irene Worth a Rose
- Gary Bond as Ron
- Catherine Lacey as Hettie
- Grant Taylor as Kurt
- John Bailey as Sam
- Helen Horton as Mona

== Bibliography ==
- David Pattie. Modern British Playwriting: The 1950s: Voices, Documents, New Interpretations. 2013.
