= Amanda Kirby (actress) =

English actress (born 1960)

- Born: 1960 (age 65–66); Kew
- Education: Corona Academy
- Occupation: Actress
- Years active: 1972–present
- Spouse: Ross Jackson (m. 1992)

Amanda Kirby (born 1960) is an English actress, best known for her work on television in the 1970s and 1980s. She had major roles in the STV adaptation of The Prime of Miss Jean Brodie (1978) and the BBC adaptation of Daphne de Maurier's My Cousin Rachel (1983). She featured in several children's series, playing Jenny in the HTV supernatural serial The Clifton House Mystery (1978) and playing the title role in Echoes of Louisa (1981).

== Early life ==
Amanda Kirby was born in Kew in 1960. She attended the Corona Academy in Hammersmith, initially wanting to be a dancer but settling on acting as she found it more satisfying. In 1972, whilst still at the school, she was chosen to appear on the light entertainment television series Saturday Variety in a dance routine with Lionel Blair.

== Career ==
She made her first major television appearance, credited as Mandy Kirby, in 1974 when she appeared as Kitty Holly in four episodes of Yorkshire Television's adaptation Winifred Holtby's novel South Riding. It was the first of a string of historical roles for Kirby, something she partly credited to her "old-fashioned face". In 1976, she was cast as young Antonia in BBC2 series I, Claudius.

Kirby's first major role came in 1978 when she starred in STV's seven-part series of The Prime of Miss Jean Brodie, based on the novel by Muriel Spark. She played Jenny Gray, one of the devoted pupils of Brodie (Geraldine McEwan) in 1930s Edinburgh. Described by the Sunday Telegraph as an "unexpected cracker", the 1978 series was successful, with Kirby's performance described as "exceptionally good" in The New York Times. The exposure impacted Kirby's image; ahead of a Channel 4 repeat showing in 1984, she told the Daily Record "Miss Brodie gave me a great start. The trouble is people still think of me as being 17. They try to tell my agent I'm too young for a part." Kirby's next role was teenager Jenny in the HTV supernatural children's serial The Clifton House Mystery.

1979 saw roles in the six-part serial The Strange Affair of Adelaide Harris and the four-part romantic drama Kiss the Girls and Make Them Cry. The following year, Kirby featured in the BBC's adaptation of Pamela Brown's The Swish of the Curtain. In 1981, she took the title role of a jealous Victorian girl in the ATV children's series Echoes of Louisa. In 1983, she starred as Louise Kendall in the BBC2 four-part serial My Cousin Rachel, an adaptation of Daphne du Maurier's 1951 novel. Other early '80s appearances include roles in the anthology series Leap in the Dark and Saturday Night Thriller.

Kirby focused on the theatre after the mid-1980s, making her last television appearance playing a nurse in Eastenders in 1988. That year, she starred as Evelyn opposite Dear John actors Ralph Bates, Peter Denyer, Peter Blake and Rachel Bell in a Richmond Theatre production of Alan Ayckbourn's play Absent Friends. She appeared alongside Denyer again the following year in a production of Richard Gordon's comedy Doctor on the Boil. In 1992, Kirby toured England in Michael Friend's Stageland, an adaptation of Jerome K. Jerome's 1889 collection of satirical essays on Victorian theatre.

== Personal life ==
Kirby married Ross Jackson in 1992.
