= Thursday's Children =

1954 film

- Directed by: Guy Brenton; Lindsay Anderson
- Written by: Guy Brenton; Lindsay Anderson
- Narrated by: Richard Burton
- Cinematography: Walter Lassally
- Music by: Geoffrey Wright
- Production companies: World Wide Pictures; Morse Films
- Distributed by: Republic Pictures
- Release date: May 1954 (UK)
- Running time: 21 minutes
- Country: United Kingdom
- Language: English

Thursday's Children is a 1954 British short documentary film directed by Guy Brenton and Lindsay Anderson about The Royal School for the Deaf in Margate, Kent, UK, a residential school then teaching lip reading rather than sign language.

== Synopsis ==
Apart from music and narration, the film is nearly silent and focuses on the faces and gestures of the little boys and girls. It features methods and goals not now used, and notes that only one child in three will achieve true speech. Anderson and Brenton were unable to gain distribution for the film until it won an Oscar in 1955 for Documentary Short Subject. The Academy Film Archive preserved Thursday's Children in 2005.

== Cast ==
- Richard Burton as narrator

== Reception ==
The Monthly Film Bulletin wrote: "This short and unpretentious film achieves its object by the simplest possible means. There are no heroics or climactic structures of pathos; the children are always laughing and happy at lessons that seem more like games. The commentary (admirably spoken by Richard Burton) describes calmly the nature of the problems and the way they are tackled. But through all this is revealed a great warmth of affection and a sort of defeated indignation. The secret is perhaps that the people who appear in the film – the bright, tired teachers and the puppy-like children, struggling unconsciously towards comprehension – are treated, and emerge, as human beings and individuals – an attitude not always common in British documentary. This has been largely achieved by the remarkable intimacy with which the camera has caught fi chfidren at their lessons and in their social life together. In its narrow scope, Thursday's Child is possibly more effective than that other admirable film on the same subject, Mandy."

In Sight and Sound Gavin Lambert wrote: "This is the freshest, most human short film to be made in this country since David; and it is pleasant to report its award of an Oscar by the American Academy of Motion Picture Arts and Sciences as the best short subject of 1954, and its acceptance here by the Granada circuit. While Thursday's Children certainly gives an idea of the methods of work involved, and the dedication on both sides, teachers and pupils, they demand, the memory that one carries away is principally of a particular, enclosed world. ... With this delicate subject, the makers, Guy Brenton and Lindsay Anderson, have achieved an unusual purity of emotional response. ... The commentary, with its attractive and felt simplicity, is worthily spoken by Richard Burton; the photography (Waiter Lassally) matches it perfectly, and the music (Geoffrey Wright) is mainly sympathetic and discreet. The film is presented by World Wide Pictures, who enterprisingly took it over after viewing it at a silent rough-cut stage. – Gavin Lambert."

== See also ==
- Richard Burton filmography
