= Great Expectations (1967 TV series) =

- Genre: Historical drama
- Based on: Great Expectations by Charles Dickens
- Written by: Hugh Leonard
- Directed by: Alan Bridges
- Starring: Gary Bond; Francesca Annis; Maxine Audley
- Country of origin: United Kingdom
- Original language: English
- No. of series: 1
- No. of episodes: 10

Production
- Producer: Campbell Logan
- Running time: 25 minutes
- Production company: BBC

Original release
- Network: BBC1
- Release: 22 January – 26 March 1967

Great Expectations is a British ten-part television series which first aired on BBC1 in 1967. It is an adaptation of the 1861 novel Great Expectations by Charles Dickens, which follows a humble orphan suddenly becoming a gentleman with the help of an unknown benefactor.

All episodes survived the BBC's routine junking and were released on DVD in April 2017 by Simply Media.

== List of episodes ==
- Episode 1: 'The Convict' (22 January 1967)
- Episode 2: 'Miss Havisham' (29 January 1967)
- Episode 3: 'Apprenticeship' (5 February 1967)
- Episode 4: 'Confidences Exchanged' (12 February 1967)
- Episode 5: 'The Betrayal' (19 February 1967)
- Episode 6: 'Herbert's Warning' (26 February 1967)
- Episode 7: 'Pip's Benefactor' (5 March 1967)
- Episode 8: 'Estella's Father' (12 March 1967)
- Episode 9: 'Retribution' (19 March 1967)
- Episode 10: 'Face to Face' (26 March 1967)

Notable about the conclusion of this series is that its ending follows Dickens' originally intended ending, with Pip and Estella meeting after she has remarried, and going their separate ways after a brief conversation.

== Main cast ==
- Gary Bond as Pip
- Christopher Guard as Young Pip
- Francesca Annis as Estella
- Maxine Audley as Miss Havisham
- Neil McCarthy as Joe Gargery
- Richard O'Sullivan as Herbert Pocket
- Peter Vaughan as Mr. Jaggers
- Bernard Hepton as Wemmick
- Norman Scace as Pumblechook
- Hannah Gordon as Biddy
- Shirley Cain as Mrs. Gargery
- Ronald Lacey as Orlick
- Elsie Wagstaff as Sarah Pocket
- Jon Laurimore as Bentley Drummle
- John Tate as Magwitch

One notable aspect of the production is that Audley was only 43 when she played the old and decrepit Miss Havisham. Although this drew little to no attention at the time, Gillian Anderson, who was also 43 when she played Havisham in the 2011 BBC adaptation, had some outlets calling attention to her casting in the role.

== Critical reception ==
This adaptation has been positively received, and was hugely popular at the time of broadcast. "Even with so many different adaptations of Great Expectations jostling for position," Archive Television Musings wrote, "this 1967 serial – although it may lack the budget and scale of some of the others – is still worthy of attention. Tightly scripted and well acted, it’s a very solid production which still stands up well today."

== Archive status ==
The original master videotapes of the series were wiped during the BBC's archival clearing of older programmes throughout the 1970s. Although thought by some as lost for decades, all ten episodes survived as 16mm film copies which, most likely due to poor storage, suffer from a great vary in quality. Episodes 7 ("Pip's Benefactor") and 9 ("Retribution"), for example, are of the poorest quality, suffering from muffled sound, black lines on the top and bottom of the frame, and an overall lower image quality. Episodes such as 1 ("The Convict"), however, exist with high sound and picture quality, with only minor scratches and dirt on the film. As Simply Media did not have the budget required to put the films through restoration before release on DVD, all episodes are presented with these physical shortcomings, with a disclaimer at the beginning of the DVD.

=== 1959 BBC version ===
The BBC previously adapted Great Expectations as a 13-part serial in 1959 written by P.D. Cummins, starring Dinsdale Landen in his television debut as adult Pip. Although popular at the time (and rebroadcast in 1960), it has since fallen into relative obscurity. It has never been fully released online or onto DVD as one of the episodes (Part Eight) is missing from the BBC Archives. Part One is available to view for free at the BFI Mediatheque service, and the other surviving episodes can be accessed by booking a screening session at their building on Stephen Street in London.

Other cast members include Colin Jeavons as adult Herbert Pocket, Michael Gwynn as Joe Gargery, Jerold Wells as Magwitch, Kenneth Thornett as Mr. Jaggers, Ronald Ibbs as Mr. Wemmick, Marjory Hawtrey as Miss Havisham, Richard Warner as Orlick, Helen Lindsay as adult Estella, Margot Van der Burgh as Mrs. Joe Gargery, Gabrielle Hamilton as Biddy, Nigel Davenport as Bentley Drummle and Colin Spaull as young Pip.

== Bibliography ==
- Ellen Baskin. Serials on British Television, 1950-1994. Scolar Press, 1996.
