= Alan Bridges =

English TV and film director (1927–2013)

- Born: 28 September 1927; Liverpool, England
- Died: 7 December 2013 (aged 86)
- Occupation: Film director
- Years active: 1961-1991

Alan Bridges (28 September 1927 – 7 December 2013) was an English television and film director.

In 1967 Bridges directed a television adaptation of Charles Dickens' Great Expectations starring Gary Bond as Pip.

He won the Grand Prix at the 1973 Cannes Film Festival for his film The Hireling. His film Out of Season (1975) was entered into the 25th Berlin International Film Festival, and his period-costume film The Shooting Party (1985) was entered into the 14th Moscow International Film Festival. For television, Bridges directed several works by David Mercer and Dennis Potter.

Peter Bradshaw on theguardian.com film blog wrote: "Bridges was a brilliant poet and cinematic satirist – in tones both mordant and melancholy – of the English class system of the early 20th century, and a director with a flair for psychology and interior crisis, as evidenced by movies like The Return of the Soldier (1982) and The Shooting Party (1985)."

== Selected filmography ==
- Act of Murder (1964)
- Invasion (1965)
- Great Expectations (TV, 1967)
- Les Miserables (TV, 1967)
- Traitor (TV, 1971)
- Follow the Yellow Brick Road (TV, 1972)
- The Hireling (1973)
- Brief Encounter (TV film, 1974)
- Joe's Ark (TV, 1974)
- Out of Season (1975)
- Little Girl in Blue Velvet (1978)
- Rain on the Roof (TV, 1980)
- The Return of the Soldier (1982)
- Pudd'nhead Wilson (TV, 1984)
- Displaced Person (TV, 1985)
- The Shooting Party (1985)
- The Tale of Pig Robinson (1990)
