= Frank Jarvis (actor) =

British actor (1941–2010)

- Photo: Ronald Grant Archive
- Born: John Francis Train; 13 May 1941; Stockton-on-Tees, County Durham, England, United Kingdom
- Died: 15 September 2010 (aged 69); Harefield, Middlesex, England, United Kingdom
- Spouse: Christine Murphy (divorced)

Frank Jarvis (13 May 1941 – 15 September 2010) was a British character actor.

He was educated at Orange Hill County Grammar School for Boys, Edgware, where he played Puck in A Midsummer Night's Dream and the title role in Bernard Shaw's Saint Joan. He trained at RADA and made his film debut in Mix Me a Person (1962).

One of Jarvis' best known cinema roles was his portrayal of Roger in the 1969 British crime caper film, The Italian Job. In one of the film's iconic scenes, Jarvis' character is stranded in a bus hanging off a cliff. He also appeared in films such as That Kind of Girl (1963), Rotten to the Core (1965), Nobody Ordered Love (1972), Out of Season (1975) and A Bridge Too Far (1977).

His television appearances include the Doctor Who serials The War Machines (1966), Underworld (1978) and The Power of Kroll (1978).

In the 1980s he spent many summer seasons with Wendy Macphee's outdoor Shakespeare company Theatre Set-Up, touring throughout England and the Isle of Man as well as Belgium and Denmark.

Jarvis died on 15 September 2010, at the age of 69. He was a resident of Merry Hill Road in Bushey, Hertfordshire.

== Filmography ==
Year	Title	Role	Notes
1962	Mix Me a Person	Nobby	
1963	That Kind of Girl	Max	
1965	Rotten to the Core	Moby	
1968	Star!	First Soldier at St. James Palace	Uncredited
1969	Mosquito Squadron	RAF Corporal Escorting Beth	Uncredited
1969	The Italian Job	Roger	
1972	Nobody Ordered Love	Corporal	
1975	Out of Season	Postman	
1977	A Bridge Too Far	Colonel Frost's Aide	
1979	A Horse Called Jester	Carne	
1981	Dangerous Davies: The Last Detective	Farm Heavy	
1987	The Second Victory	Duty sergeant	
1990	The Krays	Drill Sergeant	Uncredited
2006	The Penalty King	Mr. McClintock	
