= Rotten to the Core (film) =

1965 British film by John Boulting

- UK campaign book
- Directed by: John Boulting
- Written by: Roy Boulting; Jeffrey Dell; Len Heath; John Warren
- Produced by: Roy Boulting
- Starring: Anton Rodgers; Charlotte Rampling; Eric Sykes; Ian Bannen
- Cinematography: Freddie Young
- Edited by: Teddy Darvas
- Music by: Michael Dress
- Distributed by: British Lion
- Release date: 14 July 1965 (UK)
- Running time: 89 minutes
- Country: United Kingdom
- Language: English

Rotten to the Core is a 1965 black and white British comedy film directed by John Boulting starring Anton Rodgers, Charlotte Rampling, Eric Sykes and Ian Bannen. It was co-written and produced by Boulting and his brother Roy Boulting. The film received a BAFTA nomination for Alex Vetchinsky's production design.

It was Charlotte Rampling's first credited role.

== Plot ==
Upon finishing a prison sentence, a trio of crooks go in search of their one-time leader, known as "The Duke", who was supposed to safeguard their share of the money which was never recovered. However, the Duke's girlfriend Sara tells them the Duke is dead and the money is long gone. Later, the gang discover that she's lying, and that the Duke has set up a spa, the Hope Springs Nature Clinic, as a front. The Duke is planning a major heist with some criminal cronies.

The complex plot involves the police, the British Army, officers of the German army and a complicated deception by means of rail, with real German army officers being tricked into getting off the train one stop early, to be replaced by criminals in their guise. Leading the army group is Lt Vine who is successfully deceived by the whole affair (aided by Sara feeding him false information) and he has to bear the brunt of the blame.

Some of the comedy comes from Eric Sykes in various guises as an undercover policeman.

== Cast ==
- Anton Rodgers as the Duke
- Charlotte Rampling as Sara Capell
- Eric Sykes as William Hunt
- Ian Bannen as Lt. Percy Vine
- Thorley Walters as Chief Constable Preston
- Peter Vaughan as Sir Henry Capell
- Dudley Sutton as Jelly
- Kenneth Griffith as Lenny the Dip
- James Beckett as Scapa Flood
- Victor Maddern as Anxious O'Toole
- Avis Bunnage as Countess de Wett
- Frank Jarvis as Moby
- Raymond Huntley as prison governor
- Dandy Nichols as woman in cemetery

== Production ==
The film was based on an original idea by Roy Boulting which he gained, he told The New York Times, when recuperating from a broken neck in 1964. "Call it a cynical comment on organised thievery today," he said. Filming began in February 1965 at Shepperton Studios.

== Critical reception ==
The Monthly Film Bulletin wrote: "This is the film about bumbling crooks emerging from jail, mounting a daring coup, and ending in total disaster, which British studios seem to produce with unfailing regularity roughly once a year. The jokes are occasionally mildly funny, but usually very familiar. Anton Rodgers plays (rather well) the Peter Sellers role as the mastermind; Eric Sykes contributes his turn as a bumbling private detective; and so on, and so on. Only Thorley Walters, in an engaging performance as a narcissistic and health-obsessed police inspector, manages to break the bonds of routine."

Variety wrote that Anton Rodgers "shows versatility in four or five characterizations...(But) the Boulting Brothers' knives are less sharp than customary. The Boultings put their faith in an unknown girl (Charlotte Rampling) as the Duke’s moll. She is quite easy on the eye but lacks the experience and personality."

Time Out wrote the film had "some mildly funny moments, but most of the jokes are laboriously set up and loudly telegraphed."

The Radio Times Guide to Films gave the film 2/5 stars, writing: "Everywhere you looked during the early 1960s, there was a comic criminal mastermind planning an audacious raid that was doomed to failure because his gang were paid-up members of Dolts Anonymous. Anton Rodgers is the great brain here, posing as a top-ranking general in order to rob an army camp. Charlotte Rampling is slinkily amusing as the moll, but what few laughs there are come from Eric Sykes. Fitfully funny. "
