= Amanda Kirby (neurodiversity scholar) =

Scholar in neurodiversity

Amanda Kirby is a scholar in the field of neurodiversity.

Kirby earned a MBBS from University of Wales, Cardiff (1982), a MRCGP (1987), and PhD from University of Leeds (2009). As of 2014, Kirby worked at the University of South Wales, where she held a chair in developmental disorders in education. As of 2024, she is professor emeritus at the University of South Wales, and an honorary professor at Cardiff University.

In 2012, she co-founded Do-IT Solutions, a technology company that supports neurodivergent individuals.

Kirby has at least two children, the second of which was diagnosed with dyspraxia in1985, after which she focused her career on studying developmental disorders.

== Books ==
- Kirby, Amanda (1999). Dyspraxia: The Hidden Handicap. Souvenir Press. ISBN 978-0-285-63512-8.
- Kirby, Andrew; Drew, Sharon (2003). Guide to Dyspraxia and Developmental Coordination Disorders. Taylor and Francis. ISBN 978-1-85346-913-8.
- Kirby, Amanda; Kaplan, Bonnie J. (2003). Fast Facts: Specific Learning Difficulties. S. Karger. ISBN 978-1-903734-39-1.
- Kirby, Amanda (2004). The Adolescent with Developmental Co-ordination Disorder (DCD). Jessica Kingsley Publishers. ISBN 978-1-84310-178-9.
- Kirby, Amanda; Peters, Lynne (2007). 100 Ideas for Supporting Pupils with Dyspraxia and DCD. Continuum International. ISBN 978-0-8264-9440-5. OCLC 71812663.
- Kirby, Amanda (2013). Mapping SEN: Routes through Identification to Intervention. Taylor and Francis. ISBN 978-1-84312-460-3.
- Kirby, Amanda (2013). How to Succeed with Specific Learning Difficulties at College and University: A Guide for Students, Educators and Parents. Souvenir Press. ISBN 978-0-285-64243-0.
- Kirby, Amanda (2014). How to Succeed in Employment with Specific Learning Difficulties: A Guide for Employees and Employers. Souvenir Press. ISBN 978-0-285-64245-4.
- Smith, Theo; Kirby, Amanda (2021). Neurodiversity at Work: Drive Innovation, Performance, and Productivity with a Neurodiverse Workforce. Kogan Page Limited. ISBN 978-1-3986-0024-9.
