= Gary Bond =

English actor (1940–1995)

- Bond in the 1960s
- Born: Gary James Bond; 7 February 1940; Liss, Hampshire, England
- Died: 12 October 1995 (aged 55); Ealing, England
- Education: Central School of Speech & Drama
- Occupation: Actor
- Years active: 1963–1994
- Partner(s): Jeremy Brett (1969–1976); E.J. Taylor (1979–1995)

Gary James Bond (7 February 1940 – 12 October 1995) was an English actor. He is known for originating the role of Joseph in Tim Rice and Andrew Lloyd Webber's musical Joseph and the Amazing Technicolor Dreamcoat, his performances in several high-profile West End plays and musicals, and his portrayal of protagonist John Grant in the Australian film Wake in Fright (1971).

== Early life ==
Bond was born in the village of Liss, Hampshire, England. He was the first born child of his parents. He was born into a family in which the army was the destined career for any family member, with his father and numerous uncles being in the army. As a result, it was always assumed that he would follow in this tradition and was frequently persuaded by his family that this was his career path. Yet Bond from a young age had always harboured a love for acting.

He was educated in Churcher's College in Petersfield and later Portsmouth College of Technology. His father died in December 1956 when Bond was aged just 16 and, as a result, the young Bond was able to pursue his preferred path without any interference by family members. After leaving education he moved to Johannesburg, South Africa for a gap year.

However, he soon returned to England, after he won a scholarship at London's prestigious Central School of Speech & Drama. During his three years there, he gained several awards, including the Margaret Rawlings Cup, shared with Angela Morant, and the Elsie Fogerty Prize for the Best Individual Performance by a Man.

== Career ==
=== Early career ===
At the age of 23, Bond gained his first acting job with the Connaught Theatre, Worthing. His debut performance was in a play titled Not in the Book and was followed by Doctor in the House, where Bond appeared as Dr Simon Sparrow.

In 1962, he made his big break when he was cast in the role of Pip in the Royal Court's production of Arnold Wesker's Chips with Everything. Directed by John Dexter, it became one of the theatrical landmarks of the 1960s. As result of the play's success, he made his Broadway debut when the production transferred the following year in 1963.

In 1968, Bond was invited to join the Prospect Theatre Company, where he, relishing the opportunity to appear in classical roles, appeared in numerous productions including, Sebastian in Twelfth Night, Sergius in Shaw's Arms and the Man and No Man's Land.

In 1970, at the Open Air Theatre, Regent's Park, he played Benedick in Much Ado About Nothing and the one man show Lord Byron.

=== Theatre ===
In late August 1972, he created the role of Joseph in Tim Rice and Andrew Lloyd Webber's musical Joseph and the Amazing Technicolor Dreamcoat. Premiering at the Edinburgh International Festival by the Young Vic Theatre Company, it was directed by Frank Dunlop. He later joined the London production at the Albery Theatre to great acclaim.

Tim Rice and Andrew Lloyd Webber wrote a song for Bond titled "Disillusion Me", which he recorded as a single.

In 1976, he joined the Royal Shakespeare Company;, where he played Hevern in Maxim Gorky's The Zykovs and Willy Oban in The Iceman Cometh. He played opposite Ralph Richardson in Alice's Boys and in Noël Coward's Tonight at Eight, in which he co-starred with Millicent Martin. He also joined seasons at the Chichester Festival Theatre and the Bristol Old Vic, including a production of Old Flames which transferred to the Arts Theatre. He played Brutus in Julius Caesar and starred in the world premiere of Jean Anouilh's play Scenario in Canada.

When David Essex planned to leave Rice and Lloyd Webber's musical Evita, they looked for someone to play the part of Che. After being introduced by Lloyd Webber, producer Hal Prince and Bond "hit it off famously and very soon Gary was cast as David Essex's takeover in Evita." He succeeded him as Che Guevara in the 1978 London production, initially opposite Elaine Paige. However, in Andrew Lloyd Webber's 2018 memoirs, he recalls that, when performing eight shows a week, playing Evita became a strain for Elaine Paige: "Help came from Gary Bond. Had anybody thought of his friend Marti Webb? Marti, like Gary, was a veteran of stacks of West End musicals. They had both been in a show called On the Level which, although a flop, had a cast which spawned a bevy of West End musical talent." Bond brought Webb round to Lloyd Webber's flat to sing for him, and suitably impressed, by November Bond was cast as Che and his friend Marti was his leading lady. Over the years, Bond became close friends with both Lloyd Webber and his then wife Sarah Brightman and often provided a "lifeline to the goings on backstage."

He played Otto in Noël Coward's Design for Living in 1982, performed in State of Affairs in 1983, appeared opposite Keith Michell in The Baccarat Scandal 1988, and in 1992 was the Count in a revival of Jean Anouilh's The Rehearsal.

In 1993, despite struggling with failing health after being diagnosed as HIV positive, he achieved one final triumph in the theatre as George in Aspects of Love, which toured the UK that same year before a short season at the Prince of Wales Theatre in London.

=== Films ===
Although probably best known as a theatrical actor in England, he also played a number of roles in feature films. Having made his screen debut when he appeared in Zulu (1964) as Private Cole, he starred as Mark Smeaton in Anne of the Thousand Days (1969) and the Australian film Wake in Fright (1971).

=== Television ===
He made his professional screen debut in 1963, in a BBC production of War and Peace. Other television roles include Pip in the 1967 television production of Great Expectations and Antonio in BBC Television's 1972 production of The Duchess of Malfi. In 1985 he starred as John Worthing to Jeremy Clyde's Algernon and Wendy Hiller's Lady Bracknell in The Importance of Being Earnest. He also appeared in Variation on a Theme, as Boswell in The Highland Jaunt, starred in the series Frontier, The Linden Tree, Affairs of the Heart, Wings of Song and a recorded version of Joseph and the Amazing Technicolor Dreamcoat.

Bond had cameos in Z-Cars, The Avengers, The Main Chance, Hart to Hart and a major role in "All the sad songs" - an episode of Bergerac.

== Wake in Fright ==
Although his film output is small, consisting of only three films, Bond is perhaps best remembered for appearing in the Australian film Wake in Fright (occasionally renamed Outback) as teacher John Grant.

A film version of Wake in Fright, based on the 1961 novel by Kenneth Cook, was linked with the actor Dirk Bogarde and the director Joseph Losey as early as 1963. However, Group W purchased the rights, hiring Canadian director Ted Kotcheff to direct the film.

Kotcheff asked multiple British actors to play the part of John Grant, and he particularly wanted Michael York. Eventually he cast a 29-year-old Bond, persuaded by his audition and his strong CV. He later commented that "Gary was magnificent so I hired him for this. I thought he had such a likability to him that it would make it easy for audiences to want to follow him on this terrifying journey."

Anthony Buckley, the film's editor, later said the producers "NLT and Group W pushed him as the 'new Peter O'Toole'". He also commented that Bond was "affable, likeable and somewhat shy, but crew members found him diffident." Monica Dawkins, the film's make-up artist, remembered that "out of hours he was very nice but during shooting he kept himself apart, he wasn't comfortable around people".

Bond started shooting in January 1970 in the mining town of Broken Hill, New South Wales.

He dyed his hair blonde for the part; as a result comparisons were made between him and Peter O'Toole.

The world premiere of Wake in Fright (as Outback) occurred on opening night of the 1971 Cannes Film Festival on 13 May. Ted Kotcheff was nominated for a Golden Palm Award. The film opened commercially in France on 22 July 1971, Great Britain on 29 October 1971, Australia during the same month, and the United States on 20 February 1972.

The film was deemed lost for years, until a copy of it was rediscovered and, following its restoration, it was screened at the 2009 Cannes Film Festival on 15 May 2009 when it was selected as a Cannes Classic title by the head of the department, Martin Scorsese. Wake in Fright is one of only two films ever to screen twice in the history of the festival. Consequently, Bond's performance was once again praised.

== Personal life ==
Within the theatrical profession, Bond was openly gay and from 1969 to 1976 was the partner of actor Jeremy Brett.

In Garry O'Connor's 2019 biography of Ian McKellen, he mentions that the two were in a relationship early in both of their careers, but it came to an end in 1972 when Bond was about to open in Joseph and the Amazing Technicolor Dreamcoat.

In the same biography, a former lover of Bond said that

He was part of one of the first relatively out [gay] couples with Jeremy Brett, but theirs was an on-off liaison which lasted for years...Bond was irresistible, with an easy warmth of manner, wonderful humour and sometimes a wicked sense of fun. He was divine, lovely and wonderful in bed.

Agent David Graham mentions in his book Casting About: A Memoir that

Had it been within my power to choose, Gary Bond would have become my life's companion. When Chips with Everything was brought to New York [which was in 1963], he was among the original British cast that came with it. Ashley-Steiner had been asked by his agent to represent him, and I was the lucky bloke assigned to look after him. Young, blond and handsome, he struck me as the most beautiful man I had ever seen. One Saturday afternoon between performances, Gary came to my apartment for a drink and a snack. We ended up in bed together and I was completely smitten. It was only afterwards I learned he was in a relationship with Jeremy Brett at the time.

From 1979, he lived with American artist and illustrator E.J. Taylor, following their initial meeting in Fire Island, New York, later moving to Barnes and then to Ealing, London.

== Death ==
Bond died of AIDS-related causes on 12 October 1995 in Ealing Hospital at the age of 55. He had been with his partner E. J. Taylor for 16 years, and he died exactly one month after Jeremy Brett.

== Legacy ==
His alma mater of Central School of Speech and Drama, established The Gary Bond Memorial Award which is "awarded annually to a BA (Hons) Acting student who is facing financial hardship".

== Filmography ==
Year	Title	Role	Notes
1964	Zulu	Private Cole	
1969	Anne of the Thousand Days	Mark Smeaton	
1971	Wake in Fright	John Grant	
