= Joe's Ark =

- Play for Today episode
- Episode no.: Series 4 Episode 12
- Directed by: Alan Bridges
- Written by: Dennis Potter
- Original air date: 14 February 1974

Episode chronology
← Previous "All Good Men"	Next → "Hot Fat"

"Joe's Ark" is the twelfth episode of fourth season of the British BBC anthology TV series Play for Today. The episode was a television play that was originally broadcast on 14 February 1974. "Joe's Ark" was written by Dennis Potter, directed by Alan Bridges, produced by Graeme McDonald, and starred Freddie Jones.

== Plot ==
In rural Wales, Lucy (Angharad Rees), the daughter of formerly god-fearing pet shop owner Joe (Freddie Jones) has returned home from her studies at Oxford University suffering from terminal cancer. Joe's crisis of belief estranges him from his neighbours in the small community and he quarrels with the priest at the local chapel during Sunday communion.

Meanwhile Joe's ostracised son Bobby (Dennis Waterman), a touring comedian with a tawdry act, is contacted at Lucy's insistence by John, an Oxford contemporary who loves her, but Lucy is much more interested in being reunited with her brother. Bobby though, returns to the pet shop moments after Lucy has died.

== Production and reception ==
"Joe's Ark" was commissioned by Play for Today script editor Ann Scott in January 1971, with the brief outline "a suburban Noah prepares for the end of the world". The play which emerged Potter described as: "it's simply that ordinary feeling of being abandoned and betrayed and left to endure". Potter was only able to attend one rehearsal, an experience of which he observed that "almost everyone concerned seemed intent on excavating the solemnity rather than the intrinsic comedy of the piece, but I was at that time either too ill or too diffident to do much about it". (Note: Potter's introduction to the text of "Joe's Ark" cited by Gilbert, p. 215 and, in a briefer form, Carpenter p. 302) The production was directed by Alan Bridges.

John R. Cook in his book about Potter notes that "the play does not so much come down on one side or the other" in the debate about the validity of a faith in God "as hold both possibilities in taut suspension".

It was the last of the six Potter plays produced by Graeme MacDonald. "That's the one I was most proud of", MacDonald told Potter biographer W. Stephen Gilbert. For unknown reasons, production of the play was delayed. The BBC's two-year copyright window had expired, and had to be reacquired before the project could be completed.
