= My Cousin Rachel (1952 film) =

1952 film by Henry Koster

- Original film poster
- Directed by: Henry Koster
- Written by: Nunnally Johnson
- Based on: My Cousin Rachel; 1951 novel by Daphne du Maurier
- Produced by: Nunnally Johnson
- Starring: Richard Burton; Olivia de Havilland; Audrey Dalton
- Cinematography: Joseph LaShelle
- Edited by: Louis R. Loeffler
- Music by: Franz Waxman
- Production company: Twentieth Century-Fox
- Distributed by: Twentieth Century-Fox
- Release date: December 25, 1952
- Running time: 98 minutes
- Country: United States
- Language: English
- Budget: $1.2 million
- Box office: $1.3 million (U.S. rentals)

My Cousin Rachel is a 1952 American romantic mystery film directed by Henry Koster and starring Olivia de Havilland, Richard Burton, Audrey Dalton, Ronald Squire, George Dolenz and John Sutton. The film is based on the 1951 novel of the same title by Daphne du Maurier.

== Plot ==
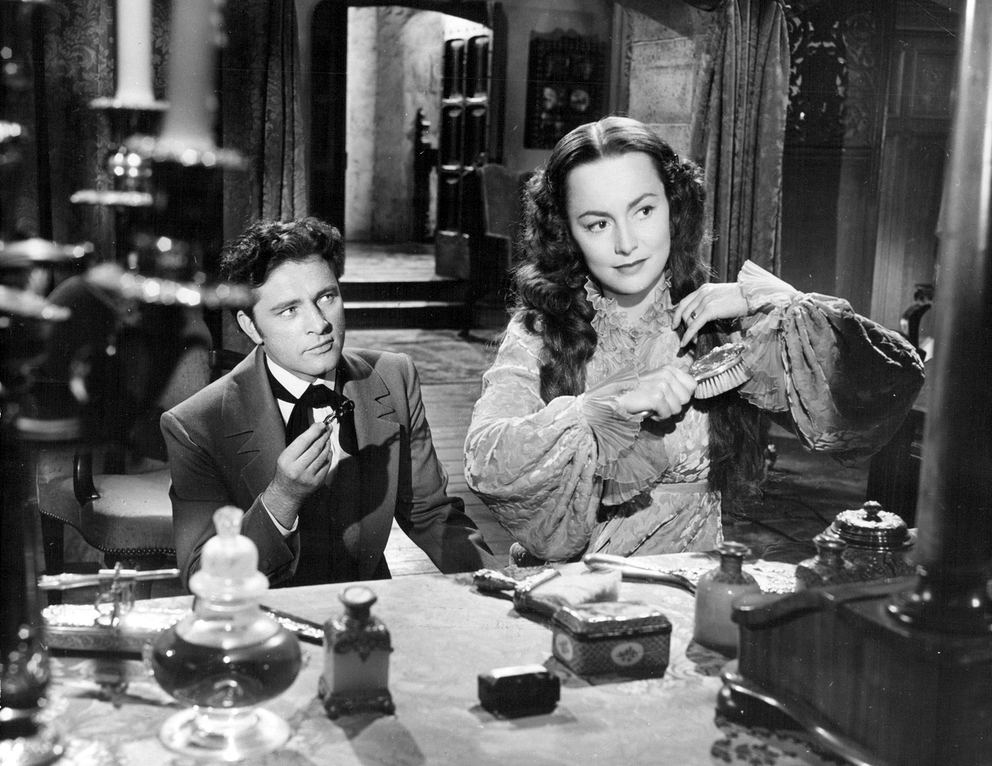
Richard Burton and Olivia de Havilland in My Cousin Rachel

On the coast of Cornwall, young Philip Ashley is raised by his older, wealthy cousin Ambrose on a large estate. When the weather threatens Ambrose's health, he moves to Florence, leaving Philip behind with his godfather Nick Kendall. In Florence, Ambrose decides to marry his cousin Rachel. However, back in Cornwall, Philip receives disturbing letters from Ambrose, complaining of Rachel's treatment as well as that of his physicians. Mr. Kendall believes that Ambrose is of unsound mind and may have inherited his dead father's brain tumor. Philip travels to Florence and meets Guido Rainaldi, who informs him that Ambrose has died of a brain tumor, producing a death certificate as proof, and that Ambrose's will left the Cornwall estate to Philip upon his 25th birthday. Rachel, who left Florence the day before Philip arrived, has inherited nothing and has no claim on the estate. Philip suspects Rachel of murder and vows revenge.

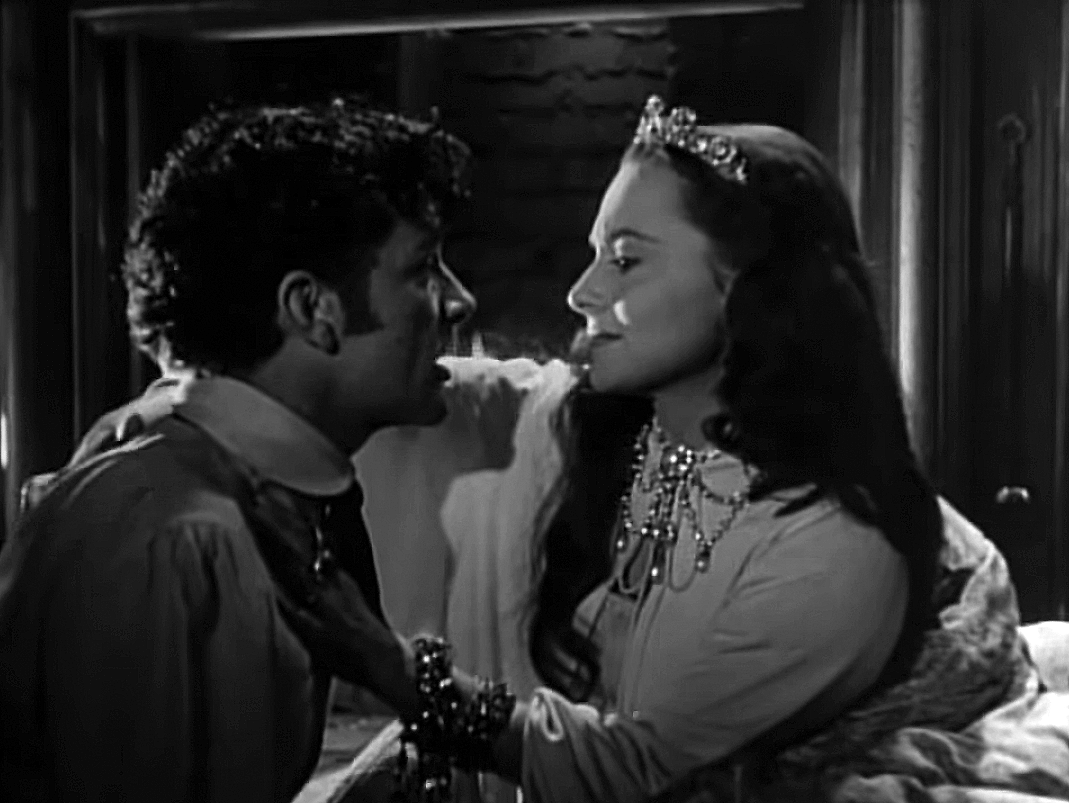
Philip gives the Ashley estate property to Rachel.

Months later, Rachel visits Cornwall and Philip invites her to the house. He discovers she is different from what he had imagined: beautiful, ladylike and kind. When she intends to leave, he shows her Ambrose's letters and admits that he planned to accuse her of wrongdoing, but as he no longer suspects her, he throws the letters in the fireplace to demonstrate his faith in her. He later instructs his executor, Mr. Kendall, to award Rachel a generous allowance of £5,000 per year, suggesting that the money is hers anyway. Rachel responds with gratitude and warmth and stays at the estate for an extended period, despite gossip. Yet when Mr. Kendall tells Philip that Rachel has overdrawn her accounts and she was notorious for "loose" living in Florence, Philip rejects Nick's warnings and instead cedes the entire estate to Rachel on his 25th birthday. When the day arrives, he solicits from her a vague romantic promise, which she gives, and they passionately kiss. However, the next day when Philip announces to his friends that he and Rachel are engaged to be wed, Rachel dismisses the announcement as lunacy. Rachel later tells Philip that her promise did not mean marriage, that she will never marry him and she only showed him love the because of the wealth that has given her.

Emotionally devastated, Philip succumbs to bouts of fever and delirium, but Rachel nurses him back to health. In his fever, Philip imagines a wedding with Rachel and awakens three weeks later convinced they are married and surprised to hear that she intends to return to Florence. Before she leaves, Philip becomes convinced that Rachel is attempting to poison him and that she had indeed murdered Ambrose. So great is his anger toward Rachel that he neglects to warn her about a footbridge in need of repair at the edge of the estate. Instead, Philip and his friend Louise secretly rummage through Rachel's room for a letter from Rainaldi, assuming that it will incriminate Rachel. Instead, upon discovering and reading the letter, they learn that Rainaldi merely discussed Rachel's affections for Philip and suggests that she bring Philip when visiting Florence.

Philip finds that Rachel has indeed suffered a fatal accident while crossing the unrepaired footbridge. With her last words, she asks Philip why he did not warn her of the danger. She then dies, leaving Philip to wonder for the rest of his life about his own guilt about the death of the innocent Rachel.

== Cast ==
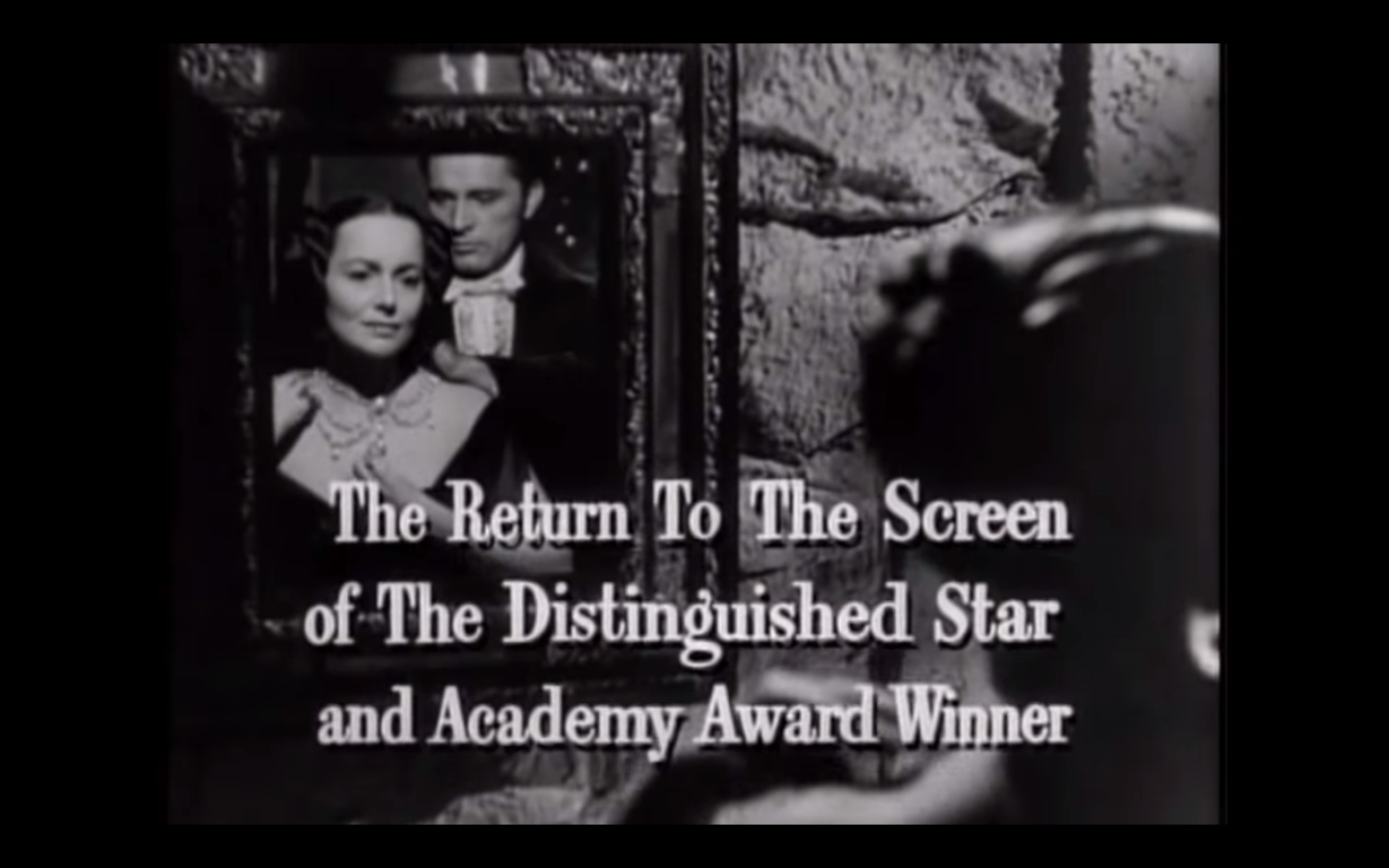
Olivia de Havilland and Richard Burton in the trailer

- Olivia de Havilland as Rachel Sangalletti Ashley
- Richard Burton as Philip Ashley
- Audrey Dalton as Louise Kendall
- Ronald Squire as Nicholas Kendall
- George Dolenz as Guido Rainaldi
- John Sutton as Ambrose Ashley
- Tudor Owen as Seecombe
- J. M. Kerrigan as Reverend Pascoe
- Margaret Brewster as Mrs. Pascoe
- Alma Lawton as Mary Pascoe
- Ola Lorraine as Pascoe Daughter
- Kathleen Mason as Pascoe Daughter
- Earl Robie as Philip at Age 5
- Argentina Brunetti as Signora
- Mario Siletti as Caretaker

== Production ==
The story was remade My Cousin Rachel in 2017 starring Rachel Weisz and Sam Claflin.

Daphne du Maurier's agent initially attempted to sell a film adaptation her novel My Cousin Rachel for $100,000, as well as 5% of the international box office. This offer was initially rejected by every major studio, but Twentieth Century-Fox obtained the rights in September 1951 for $80,000 and secured George Cukor as director. However, du Maurier and Cukor reviewed a screenplay draft and found it unfaithful to the novel. Cukor disapproved of the comedic additions, and without achieving his desired revisions to the screenplay, withdrew in late May 1952. Fox's press release explained his departure as the result of "artistic differences". Fox pursued George Stevens, who was busy directing Shane, and then Carol Reed, with Henry Koster named the director in June.

Although she had no influence on casting, du Maurier wanted either Greta Garbo or Vivien Leigh to star as Rachel. Garbo, who had not appeared on screen since Two-Faced Woman in 1941, was tempted to accept the role but was concerned that she would appear old to moviegoers and tarnish the memory of her beauty. Greer Garson was rumored to be interested in the part. After months of negotiation, Olivia de Havilland agreed to take the role in May 1952, marking her first screen appearance since The Heiress (1949). My Cousin Rachel also marked Burton's first starring role in an American film. Although uninterested in the novel or screenplay, Burton accepted the role because of his respect for Cukor, and he traveled to New York for production. Background shots were filmed in Cornwall, where the story is set.

Before agreeing to appear in the film, Burton demanded a fee of £7,000 (equivalent to $175,362 in 2025, approximately $18,000 at the time). He was surprised when Fox offered him $50,000. Burton was disappointed with de Havilland's behavior. According to Burton, she had asked Koster to inform everyone on the set that she was to be addressed as Miss de Havilland instead of the more informal Livvie, a nickname that had been used by her previous coworkers.

== Reception ==
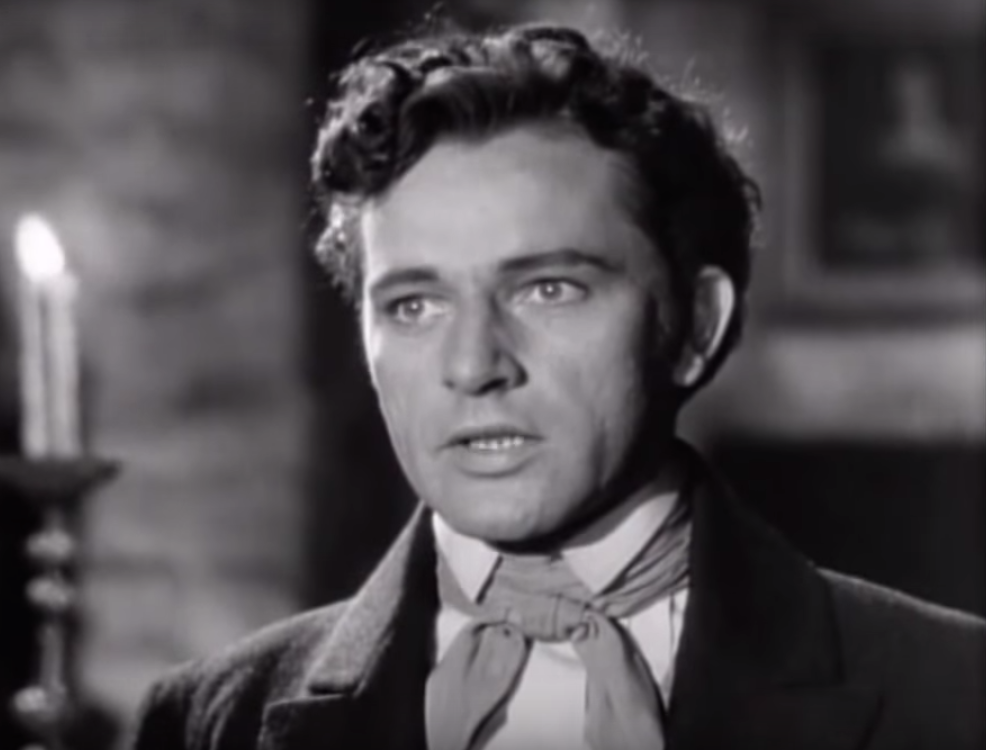
Burton was nominated for the Academy Award for Best Supporting Actor.

In a contemporary review for The New York Times, critic Bosley Crowther called the film an "excellent screen adaptation ... masterfully mounted and staged" and wrote of the film's mystery theme:

This impulse of ambiguity, which runs all the way through the film and endows it with constant fascination and uninhibited suspense, considerably obliterates the effect when it crashes against the stone wall of the author's deliberate admission of inconclusiveness. And as one searches back through the complex of personality revelations and clues, one finds that the story is little but a package of deceptions and tricks. However, so long as it is spinning—and spin it most certainly does—this nineteenth century adventure provides some delicious thrills.

Critic Philip K. Scheuer of the Los Angeles Times wrote:

I hesitate to intrude so coarse and plebeian a word as 'gimmick'—but that's what it amounts to, this device of Miss du Maurier's. As such, it is likely to react to the film's disfavor, at least among the literal minded. All too quickly they may forget that if they are bothered and bewildered at the close, they have also been bewitched for an hour and a half. ... Miss de Havilland charms even as she baffles. She is like steel sheathed in silk, soft but unyielding. Like Burton, we succumb to her femininity; and around Rachel, ''succumb" is a dangerous word.

Daphne du Maurier was disappointed with the finished film, feeling that de Havilland's portrayal of Rachel lost the mystery that defined the character and disliking her hairstyle, comparing it to that of Wallis Simpson.

== Awards ==
Award	Category	Nominee(s)	Result	Ref.
Academy Awards	Best Supporting Actor	Richard Burton	Nominated	
Academy Awards	Best Art Direction – Black-and-White	Art Direction: Lyle R. Wheeler and John DeCuir; Set Decoration: Walter M. Scott	Nominated	
Academy Awards	Best Cinematography – Black-and-White	Joseph LaShelle	Nominated	
Academy Awards	Best Costume Design – Black-and-White	Charles LeMaire and Dorothy Jeakins	Nominated	
Golden Globe Awards	Best Actress in a Motion Picture – Drama	Olivia de Havilland	Nominated	
Golden Globe Awards	Most Promising Newcomer – Male	Richard Burton	Won	

== Legacy ==
A 1983 BBC television version of My Cousin Rachel was directed by Brian Farnham, with Geraldine Chaplin as Rachel.

The film was remade in 2017, with Roger Michell as director and Rachel Weisz as the title character. The 2017 version followed a trend of contemporary adaptations of du Maurier's works.
