= 2015 British Academy Television Awards =

UK television awards ceremony

61st British Academy Television Awards
- Date: 10 May 2015
- Site: Theatre Royal, Drury Lane
- Hosted by: Graham Norton

Highlights
- Best Comedy Series: The Graham Norton Show
- Best Drama: Happy Valley
- Best Actor: Jason Watkins; The Lost Honour of Christopher Jefferies
- Best Actress: Georgina Campbell; Murdered by My Boyfriend
- Best Comedy Performance: Jessica Hynes W1A; Matt Berry Toast of London
- Most awards: Ant & Dec's Saturday Night Takeaway/Marvellous/The Lost Honour of Christopher Jefferies (2)
- Most nominations: The Missing (4)

Television coverage
- Channel: BBC One
- Duration: 2 hours

The 61st British Academy Television Awards nominations were announced on 8 April 2015.

== Winners and nominees ==
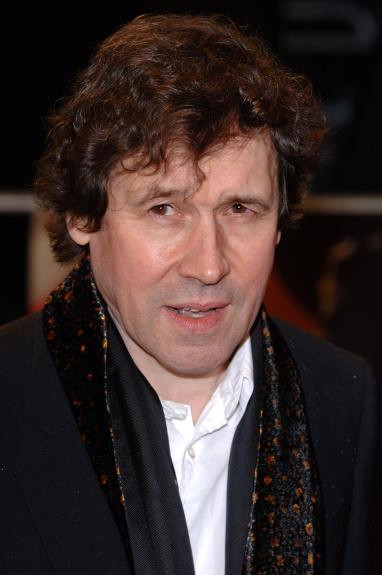
Stephen Rea, Best Supporting Actor winner

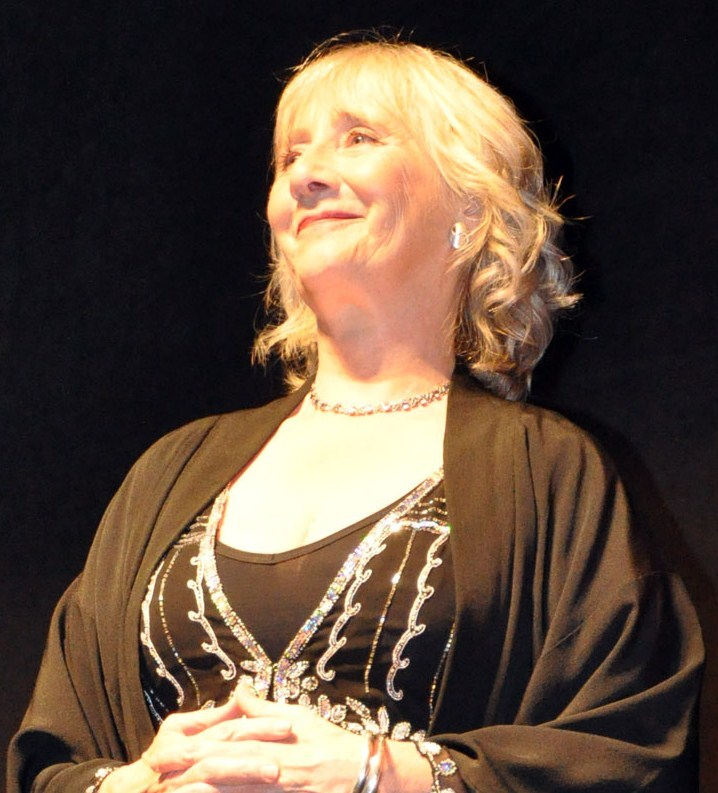
Gemma Jones, Best Supporting Actress winner

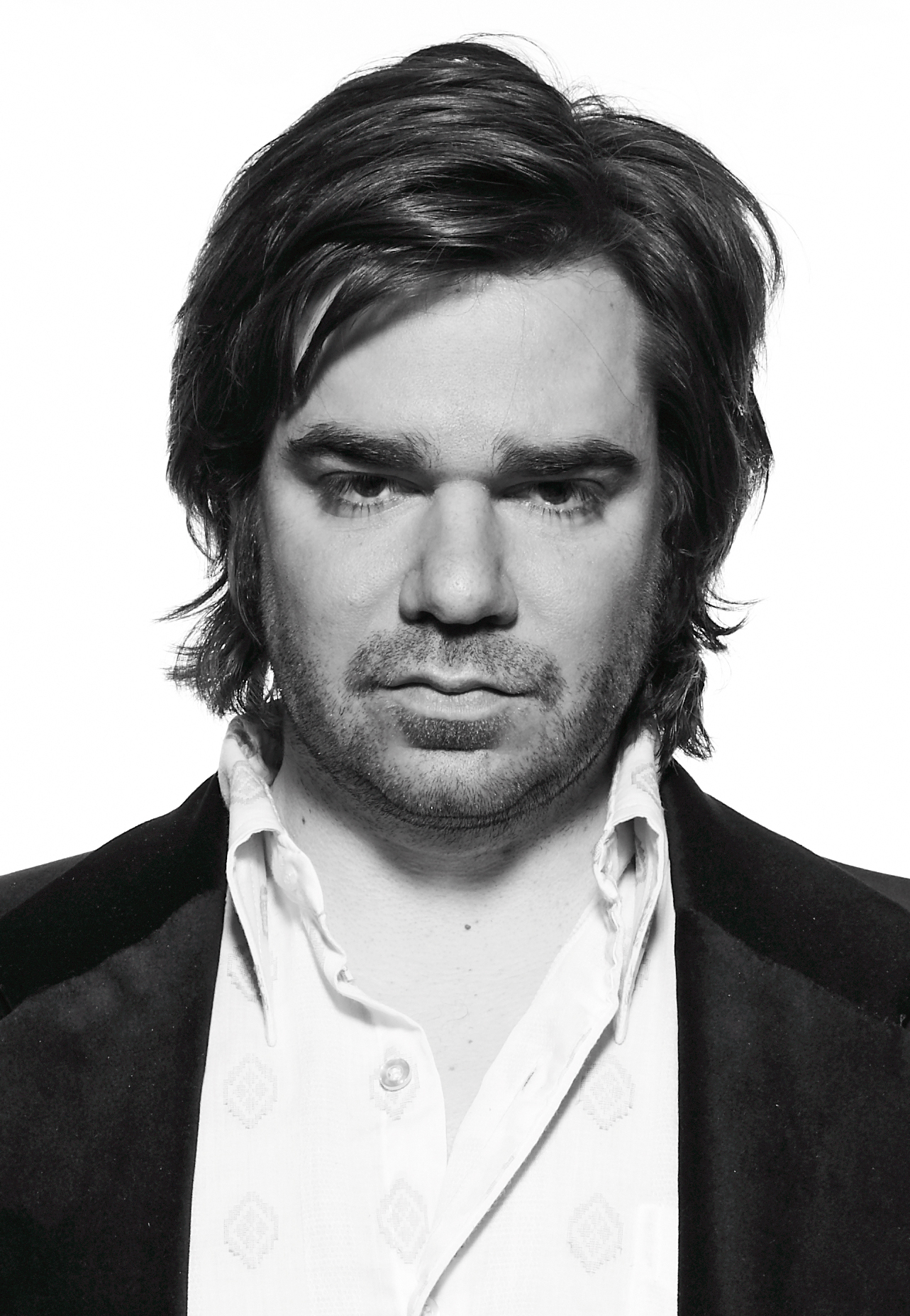
Matt Berry, Best Male Comedy Performance winner

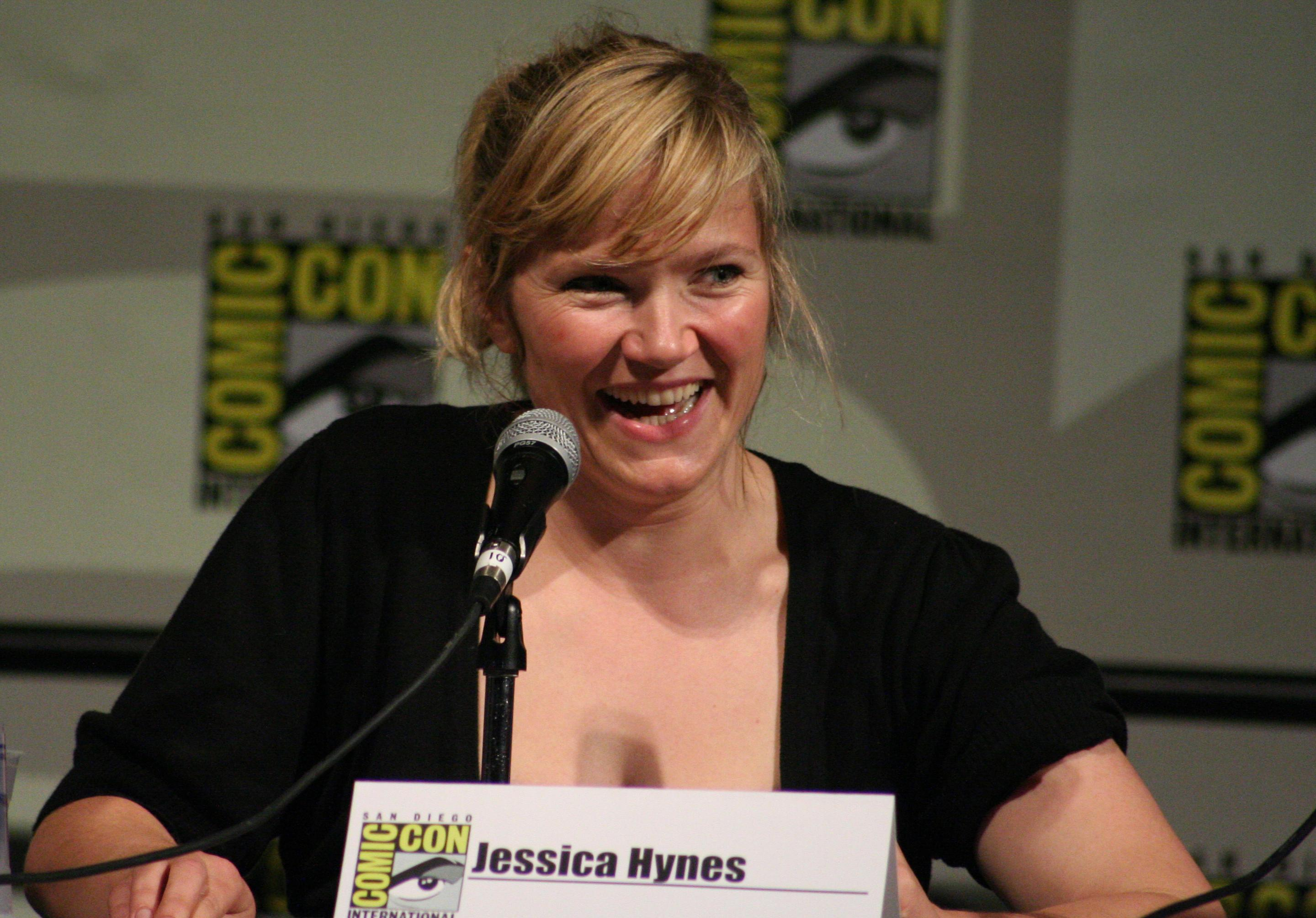
Jessica Hynes, Best Female Comedy Performance winner

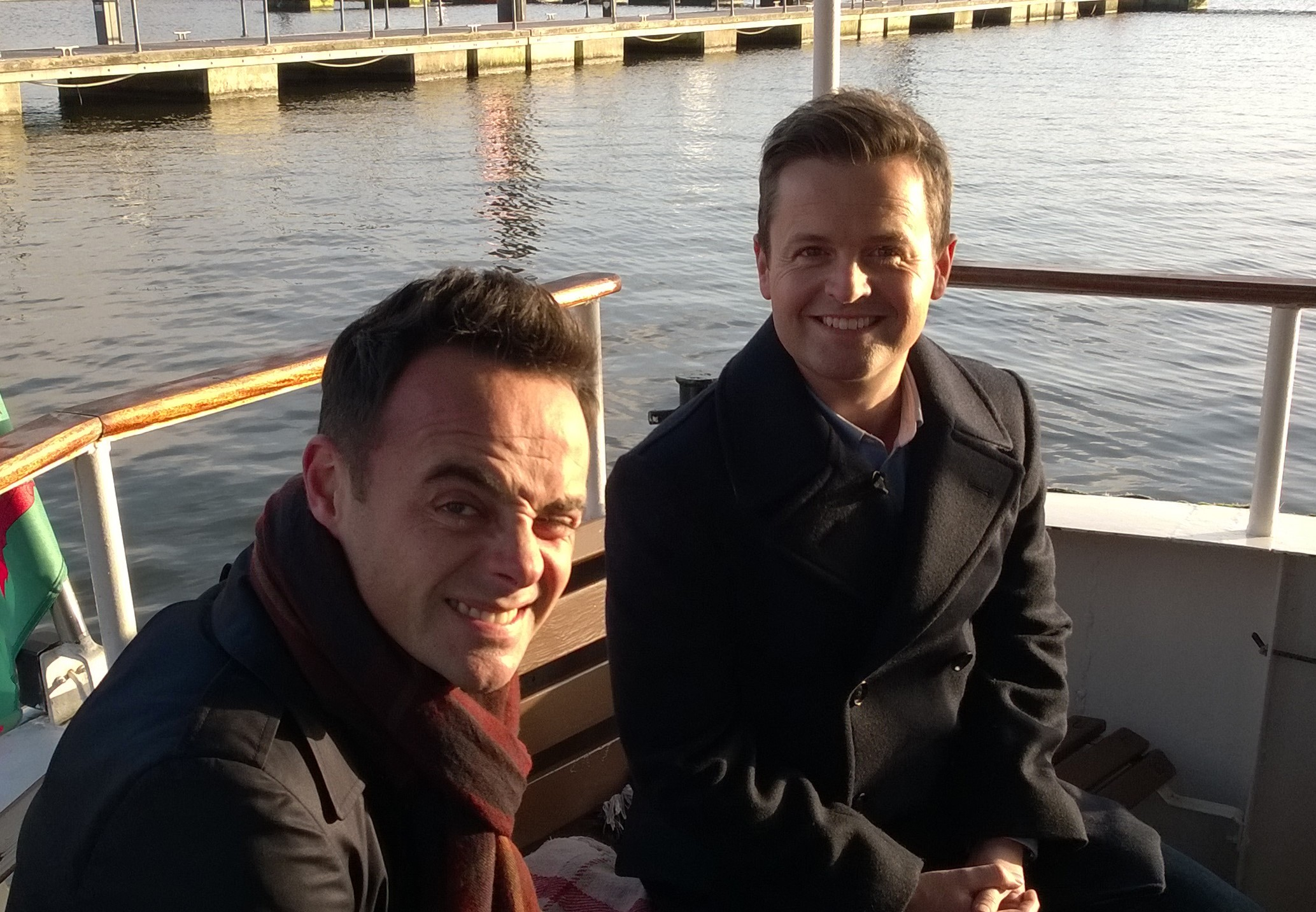
Ant & Dec, Best Entertainment Performance winners

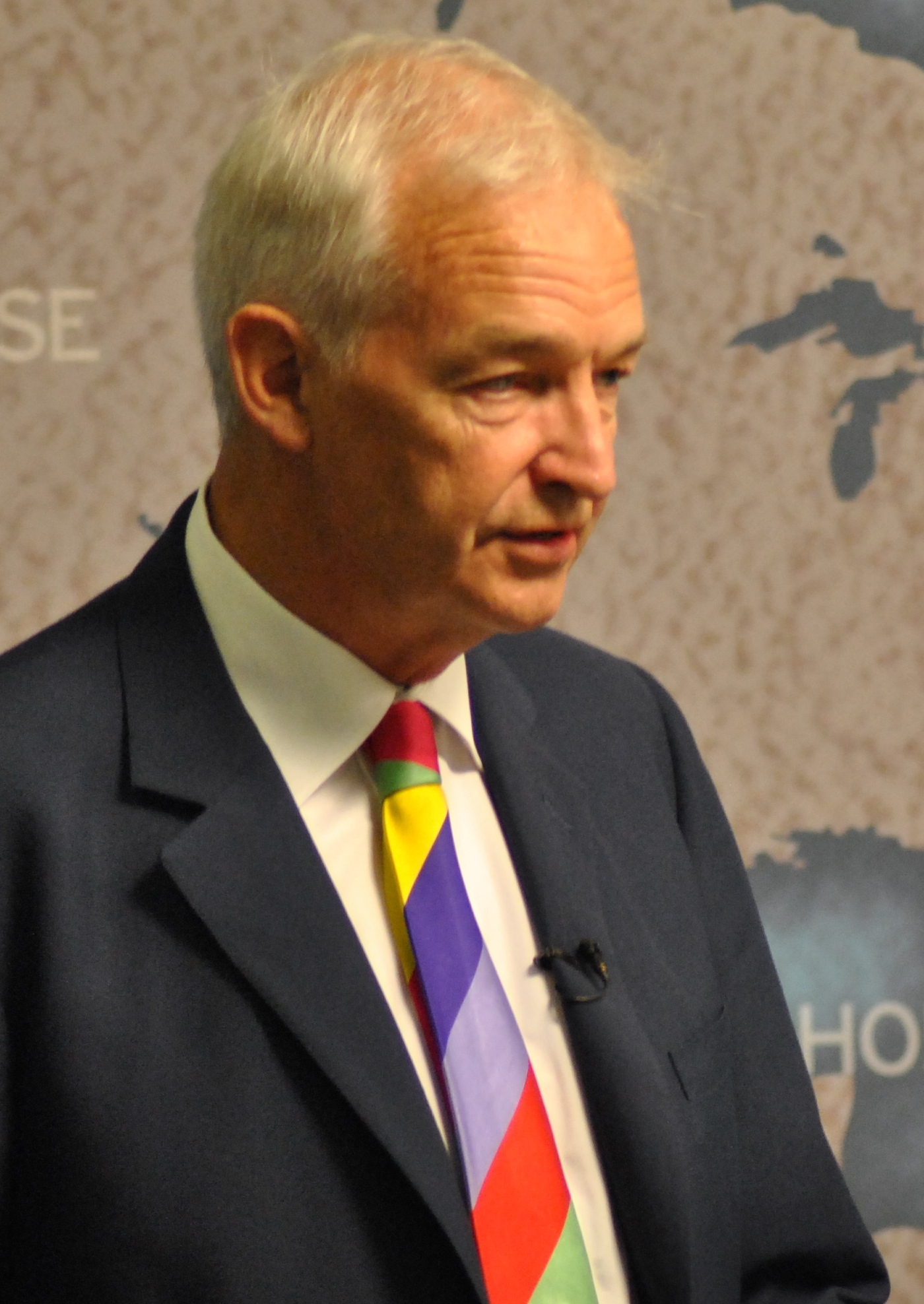
Jon Snow, BAFTA Fellowship Award winner

Winners are listed first and emboldened.

Best Actor	Best Actress
Jason Watkins – The Lost Honour of Christopher Jefferies as Christopher Jefferies (ITV); Benedict Cumberbatch – Sherlock as Sherlock Holmes (BBC One); Toby Jones – Marvellous as Neil Baldwin (BBC Two); James Nesbitt – The Missing as Tony Hughes (BBC One)	Georgina Campbell – Murdered by My Boyfriend as Ashley Jones (BBC Three); Keeley Hawes – Line of Duty as DI Lindsay Denton (BBC Two); Sarah Lancashire – Happy Valley as Catherine Cawood (BBC One); Sheridan Smith – Cilla as Cilla Black (ITV)
Best Supporting Actor	Best Supporting Actress
Stephen Rea – The Honourable Woman as Sir Hugh Hayden-Hoyle (BBC Two); Adeel Akhtar – Utopia as Wilson Wilson (Channel 4); James Norton – Happy Valley as Tommy Lee Royce (BBC One); Ken Stott – The Missing as Ian Garrett (BBC One)	Gemma Jones – Marvellous as Mary Baldwin (BBC Two); Vicky McClure – Line of Duty as DS Kate Fleming (BBC Two); Amanda Redman – Tommy Cooper: Not Like That, Like This as Gwen Cooper (ITV); Charlotte Spencer – Glue as Tina Fallon (E4)
Best Male Comedy Performance	Best Female Comedy Performance
Matt Berry – Toast of London as Steven Toast (Channel 4); Hugh Bonneville – W1A as Ian Fletcher (BBC Two); Tom Hollander – Rev. as Alex Smallbone (BBC Two); Brendan O'Carroll – Mrs. Brown's Boys : The Christmas Special as Agnes Brown (BBC One)	Jessica Hynes – W1A as Siobhan Sharpe (BBC Two); Olivia Colman – Rev. as Alex Smallbone (BBC Two); Tamsin Greig – Episodes as Beverly Lincoln (BBC Two); Catherine Tate – Catherine Tate's Nan as Joanie "Nan" Taylor (BBC One)
Best Entertainment Performance	Best Single Drama
Ant & Dec – Ant & Dec's Saturday Night Takeaway (ITV); Leigh Francis – Celebrity Juice (ITV2); Graham Norton – The Graham Norton Show (BBC One); Claudia Winkleman – Strictly Come Dancing (BBC One)	Marvellous (BBC Two); A Poet in New York (BBC Two); Common (BBC One); Murdered by My Boyfriend (BBC Three)
Best Mini-Series	Best Drama Series
The Lost Honour of Christopher Jefferies (ITV); Cilla (ITV); Our World War (BBC Three); Prey (ITV)	Happy Valley (BBC One); Line of Duty (BBC Two); The Missing (BBC One); Peaky Blinders (BBC Two)
Best Soap and Continuing Drama	Best International Programme
Coronation Street (ITV); Casualty (BBC One); EastEnders (BBC One); Hollyoaks (Channel 4)	True Detective (HBO/Sky Atlantic); The Good Wife (CBS/More4); House of Cards (Netflix); Orange is the New Black (Netflix)
Best Factual Series or Strand	Best Specialist Factual
Life and Death Row (BBC Three); 15,000 Kids and Counting (Channel 4); Educating the East End (Channel 4); Protecting Our Parents (BBC Two)	Grayson Perry: Who Are You? (Channel 4); David Attenborough's Conquest of the Skies 3D (SKY 3D); The Great War: The People's Story (ITV); Our Gay Wedding: The Musical (Channel 4)
Best Single Documentary	Best Features
The Paedophile Hunter (Channel 4); Baby P: The Untold Story (BBC One); Children of Syria (BBC Two); The Miners Strike and Me (ITV)	Grand Designs (Channel 4); George Clarke's Amazing Spaces (Channel 4); The Great British Bake Off (BBC One); Long Lost Family (ITV)
Best Reality and Constructed Factual	Best Current Affairs
The Island with Bear Grylls (Channel 4); The Apprentice (BBC One); I'm a Celebrity...Get Me Out of Here! (ITV); The Undateables (Channel 4)	Children on the Frontline (Dispatches) (Channel 4); Ebola Frontline (Panorama) (BBC One); Inside Kenya's Death Squads (Al Jazeera Investigates) (Al Jazeera English); Terror at the Mall (This World) (BBC Two)
Best News Coverage	Best Sport and Live Events
Sky News Live at Five: Ebola (Sky News); BBC News at Ten (BBC News/BBC One); Channel 4 News - Inside Gaza: Children Under Fire (Channel 4); ITV News at Ten - Iraq Crisis (ITV)	WW1 Remembered - From the Battlefield & Westminster Abbey (BBC Two); 2014 FA Cup Semi-Final: Hull City vs. Sheffield United (BT Sport 1); Monty Python Live (Mostly) (Gold); 2014 Tour de France: Stage 1 (ITV)
Best Entertainment Programme	Best Scripted Comedy
Ant & Dec's Saturday Night Takeaway (ITV); Dynamo: Magician Impossible (Watch); Strictly Come Dancing (BBC One); The Voice (BBC One)	Detectorists (BBC Four); Harry & Paul's Story Of The Twos (BBC Two); Moone Boy (Sky One); The Wrong Mans (BBC Two)
Best Comedy and Comedy Entertainment Programme	Radio Times Audience Award
The Graham Norton Show (BBC One); Charlie Brooker's Weekly Wipe (BBC Two); Stewart Lee's Comedy Vehicle (BBC Two); Would I Lie to You? (BBC One)	Sherlock (BBC One); Cilla (ITV); EastEnders (BBC One); Game of Thrones (HBO/Sky Atlantic); The Great British Bake Off (BBC One); The Missing (BBC One); Strictly Come Dancing (BBC One)
BAFTA Fellowship Award	BAFTA Special Award
Jon Snow	Clive James; Jeff Pope

== Programmes with multiple nominations ==
Programmes that received multiple nominations
Nominations	Programme
4	The Missing
3	Cilla
3	Happy Valley
3	Line of Duty
3	Marvellous
3	Strictly Come Dancing
2	Ant & Dec's Saturday Night Takeaway
2	EastEnders
2	Murdered by My Boyfriend
2	Rev
2	Sherlock
2	The Graham Norton Show
2	The Great British Bake Off
2	The Lost Honour of Christopher Jefferies
2	W1A

Networks that received multiple nominations
Nominations	Network
28	BBC One
22	BBC Two
14	Channel 4
8	ITV
4	BBC Three
2	HBO
2	Netflix
2	Sky Atlantic

== Most major wins ==
Shows that received multiple awards
Wins	Show
2	Ant & Dec's Saturday Night Takeaway
2	Marvellous
2	The Lost Honour of Christopher Jefferies

Wins by Network
Wins	Network
6	Channel 4
5	BBC Two
5	ITV
3	BBC One
2	BBC Three

== In Memoriam ==
- Donald Sinden
- Brian Clemens
- Lance Percival
- Geraldine McEwan
- Francis Matthews
- Joan Rivers
- Zohra Sehgal
- Julian Wilson
- Lynda Bellingham
- David Lomax
- Keith Harris
- Mike Smith
- Jeremy Lloyd
- Sam Kelly
- Rebekah Gibbs
- Terry Pratchett
- Leonard Nimoy
- John Bardon
- Alan Howard
- James Garner
- Richie Benaud
- Warren Clarke
- Ross Burden
- Anne Kirkbride
- Shaw Taylor
- Rik Mayall

== See also ==
- British Academy Television Awards
- BAFTA Scotland
- BAFTA Cymru
