= Llafur =

Welsh academic society and journal focused on people's history

- Discipline: History, Labour history, People's history, Women's history
- Language: English

Publication details
- History: 1972–present
- Frequency: Annual (four parts per volume)
- Open access: Partial

Standard abbreviations
- ISO 4: Llafur

Links
- Journal homepage; Journal information; Digital archive

Llafur (Welsh for 'labour'; also known as Llafur: The Welsh People's History Society) is an academic society and journal founded in 1970 to promote the study of Welsh labour history and people's history. Originally established as Llafur: The Society for the Study of Welsh Labour History, the organisation documents the social, political, and economic history of the working people of Wales. The society publishes the peer-reviewed academic journal Llafur, which has appeared annually since 1972 and has been described as the principal journal for Welsh labour and women's history research.

== History ==
Llafur was founded in 1970 during a period of renewed interest in social history and the history from below movement that emerged in the 1960s. The society was established by Professor Ieuan Gwynedd Jones, who served as its president from founding until his death in 2018. Jones, who held the Sir John Williams Chair of Welsh History at Aberystwyth University from 1969 to 1984, was a proponent of "history from below" and has been described as having developed the careers of successive generations of Welsh historians.

The society emerged during a significant expansion in Welsh historical studies, contributing to what has been described as a "massive development in Welsh historical studies" since the early 1970s. As part of the broader movement influenced by historians such as E. P. Thompson, Llafur sought to document the experiences of ordinary people and the working class in Welsh society.

The society's aims include bringing together those interested in the history of the working class and its organisations, unions, co-operative societies and political bodies; publishing scholarly research; promoting people's history through collaboration with other groups; and encouraging interest in labour history throughout the Welsh labour movement.

== Journal ==
Llafur: The Journal of the Society for the Study of Welsh Labour History is a peer-reviewed academic journal published annually since 1972 in four parts per volume. The journal publishes scholarly articles and book reviews relating to labour history, people's history, and the social, political, economic and cultural history of Wales. It accepts contributions in both English and Welsh, with submissions ranging from established international scholars to emerging researchers and amateur historians.

The journal has been described as the principal publication for Welsh labour history and women's history research, and according to academic sources has contributed to the development of Welsh historical studies over more than five decades. Llafur has been noted for its publishing of work on women's history, and has been described as the primary Welsh journal in this field. The journal's scope encompasses all aspects of people's history in Wales, focusing on the experiences and institutions of the working class and the role of ordinary people in shaping Welsh history.

The journal is included in the National Library of Wales's Welsh Journals Online project, providing digital access to its archives and contributing to the preservation and accessibility of Welsh historical scholarship.

== Leadership ==
Professor Ieuan Gwynedd Jones (1920–2018) was a founder and the first president of Llafur, serving from 1970 until his death in 2018. Born in the Rhondda Valleys to a coalminer and nurse, Jones became an academic as a mature student after working in various occupations including the merchant navy and railways. He held the Sir John Williams Chair of Welsh History at Aberystwyth University from 1969 to 1984, and was recognised as "the most influential postgraduate supervisor of research on the history of Wales during the twentieth century," developing the careers of successive generations of Welsh historians. Jones was a leading proponent of "history from below" and his major works include Explorations and Explanations (1981), Communities (1987), and Mid-Victorian Wales: the Observers and the Observed (1992).

Following Jones's death, the society was led by politician and academic Hywel Francis, who served as president until 2022. In 2022, historian Angela V. John succeeded Francis as President. John, a Fellow of the Royal Historical Society and Fellow of the Learned Society of Wales, is a specialist in women's history and labour history who had been associated with Llafur since 1977, having previously served as Chair and Vice-President. She was formerly Professor of History at the University of Greenwich and is now an honorary professor at Swansea University. John is known for her pioneering 1980 study By The Sweat of Their Brow on women's employment in the Victorian coal mining industry and was one of the founders of the academic journal Gender & History in the late 1980s. She serves on the editorial board of The Welsh History Review and has published extensively on Welsh women's history, including the influential edited collection Our Mothers' Land: Chapters in Welsh Women's History.

The society continues to honour its founder through the annual Ieuan Gwynedd Jones Prize, an essay competition recognising outstanding contributions to Welsh people's history.

== Academic significance ==
Llafur has played a significant role in the development of Welsh historiography since its establishment. According to labour historian Martin Wright, the journal emerged during and "contributed to the massive development in Welsh historical studies" that began in the early 1970s. As part of the broader "history from below" movement influenced by historians such as E. P. Thompson, Llafur has provided a platform for scholarship focused on the experiences of ordinary people and the working class in Welsh society.

Wright notes that the Welsh labour history community has "always maintained a strong sense of distinctiveness and independence" within the broader field of British labour history, with Llafur serving as a central institutional expression of this scholarly tradition. The journal has attracted contributions from "internationally-regarded scholars to young researchers at the beginning of their careers and to non-specialists and amateur historians with an interest in Wales's past." Llafur has been particularly influential in establishing women's history as a legitimate field of academic inquiry within Welsh studies, serving as "the principal journal in which work in women's history has been published in Wales."

The society's evolution reflects broader changes in Welsh historical scholarship. In its early years, it drew strength from trade union structures, with miners' union members providing "an important critical mass" for the organisation. The society has undergone two significant name changes that reflect the broadening scope of its work: from "The Society for the Study of Welsh Labour History" (1970) to "Welsh Labour History Society" (1987), and finally to "Welsh People's History Society" in 2002. The final change was intended to remedy "the defect of not clearly placing some scholarly distance between the society and party politics" and because "the word 'labour' tends to have inordinately masculine connotations." The change also aimed to encourage more contributions on pre-industrial Welsh history. However, the decline of heavy industry and mass trade unionism has impacted the society's membership base, contributing to what Wright describes as "the growing distance between Welsh labour historians and Welsh labour history."

Academic recognition of the journal's importance is reflected in its inclusion in the National Library of Wales's Welsh Journals Online project, which provides digital access to significant Welsh periodicals for researchers worldwide.
