= Marvellous =

2014 British TV film

- Marvellous DVD cover
- Written by: Peter Bowker
- Starring: Toby Jones
- Country of origin: United Kingdom
- Original language: English

Production
- Producer: Katie Swinden
- Cinematography: David Odd
- Running time: 90 minutes
- Production companies: Fifty Fathoms; Tiger Aspect Productions

Original release
- Network: BBC Two
- Release: 25 September 2014

Marvellous is a 90-minute British drama television film first broadcast on BBC Two on 25 September 2014. Directed by Julian Farino and written by Peter Bowker, it is about the life of Neil Baldwin from Westlands, Newcastle-under-Lyme, Staffordshire.

In the 1990s Baldwin, now an honorary graduate of Keele University, was appointed as Stoke City Football Club's kit-man by its manager Lou Macari.

Baldwin's autobiography, Marvellous: Neil Baldwin – My Story, was published in hardback in 2015. In 2022 his story was told on stage, in a play, also called Marvellous, performed at the New Vic Theatre in Newcastle-under-Lyme and at @sohoplace in London's West End.

== Cast ==
- Toby Jones as Neil Baldwin
- Tony Curran as Lou Macari
- Gemma Jones as Neil's mother, Mary Baldwin
- Greg McHugh as Neil's friend, Malcolm
- Nicholas Gleaves as Rev Mark

Making cameo appearances as themselves:

- Neil Baldwin
- Norman Barrett
- Gary Lineker
- Lou Macari
- Uriah Rennie

== Production ==
The programme was commissioned by Janice Hadlow and Ben Stephenson. The executive producers were Patrick Spence and Peter Bowker for Fifty Fathoms and Tiger Aspect Productions, and Lucy Richer for the BBC.

Marvellous: Neil Baldwin – My Story
- Author: Neil Baldwin, with Malcolm Clarke
- Language: English
- Genre: Autobiography
- Publisher: John Blake Publishing
- Publication date: August 2015
- Publication place: United Kingdom
- Media type: Print (hardback)

Marvellous
- Original language: English
- Written by: Neil Baldwin, Malcolm Clarke and Theresa Heskins
- Characters: Suzanne; Charlie; Gareth; Alex; Real Neil; Jerone; Daniel
- Subject: The life of Neil Baldwin

Premiere
- Date: 11 March 2022
- Place: New Vic Theatre, Newcastle-under-Lyme

== Filming locations ==
Marvellous was filmed mostly in Staffordshire. Several of the scenes were set at and filmed at Keele University. Crewe Alexandra Football Club's Alexandra Stadium and the Racecourse Ground in Wrexham, North Wales were used for the scenes set at Stoke City's football ground.

== Reception ==
Writing in The Guardian, Sam Wollaston praised Jones's "lovely, very human, performance".

Andrew Anthony, for The Observer, said "Jones realised its potential with such poignant insight into character that it’s impossible to imagine anyone else playing the part. [Baldwin]'s life has been a triumph of unselfconsciousness, which is easier read about than captured. But in a story fraught with the danger of sentimentality, Bowker located a sort of comic truth about an innocent at home and Jones made that truth both funny and movingly real."

Ellen E. Jones, reviewing the film in The Independent, said: "The triumph of Marvellous is that it's a feel good film that feels good, not through any Hollywood schmaltz, but through the sheer force of Baldwin’s own optimistic personality".

Sarah Crompton, for The Daily Telegraph, described Marvellous as "sweet and sharp ... on the whole a great number of people emerge well from this film, including Stoke City’s former manager Lou Macari (played by Tony Curran but also popping in as himself) and many long suffering clergy. It might have been too cute in different hands, but both Toby and Gemma Jones gave performances that were almost as miraculous as the story itself."

Jim White, writing in The Sunday Telegraph, described it as "a wonderful, uplifting, life affirming 90 minutes of television. And the most compelling argument yet that – despite all the evidence presented by previous filmic depictions of the beautiful game – it is possible to extract telling fiction from football."

Julie McDowall for Scotland's The Herald, described it as 2014's best television programme.

Rachel Cooke in the New Statesman said of Toby Jones' portrayal of Baldwin that he "played him brilliantly, turning in an understated performance that combined innocence and wryness to powerful effect". She praised Bowker’s "pitch perfect script, which was as natural sounding as a conversation overheard on the top deck of a bus", and Farino’s direction – "so deft, quirky, witty and attentive to important details (buildings as well as moods; rooms as well as body language)".

Reviewing the programme for the Stoke Sentinel, John Woodhouse said "It says everything for Neil that Marvellous was ever made. For in times when television is seduced by vacuity and celebrity, it doesn't sound that promising a pitch. A drama, set in Newcastle [under Lyme], about a man saddled with the tag of 'learning difficulties' who reveals himself to be so much more? Good luck with that one. And yet here it is – primetime BBC2."

The Sentinel columnist Simon Lowe described it as "the most human of stories: a truly stirring, laugh-out-loud tearjerker of a drama. Part biopic, part musical (has there ever been a better use of the ukulele in a piece of television – and I'm including George Formby's contribution to the instrument's status in that?) and part incredible journey, Marvellous was life-affirming and inspirational."

Lou Macari was quoted in The Sentinel as saying: "The film really captures Nello [Neil Baldwin] as he was and for those who didn't know him I can assure them everything in the film is true. There are many moving moments, and it must be the best 90 minutes viewing Stoke-on-Trent has had for a long time."

== Awards ==
At the 2015 British Academy Television Awards, Marvellous won the Best Single Drama award and Gemma Jones received the BAFTA for Best Supporting Actress for her portrayal of Baldwin's mother. Baldwin collected the former award and made an acceptance speech. The same year, at the Royal Television Society Programme Awards, it was nominated for Single Drama and for Actor: Male (Toby Jones) while Peter Bowker won Writing: Drama.

== DVD ==
The DVD and a digital download of Marvellous were released on 1 December 2016.

== Marvellous book ==
Baldwin's autobiography, Marvellous: Neil Baldwin – My Story, written with the help of Keele University alumnus Malcolm Clarke, was published in hardback by John Blake Publishing in August 2015.

== Marvellous play ==
Baldwin's story was adapted for the stage, in a play by Baldwin, Clarke and Theresa Heskins, also called Marvellous, performed at the New Vic Theatre in Newcastle-under-Lyme and at @sohoplace in London's West End, in 2022.
