= List of honorary freemen of the City of Stoke-on-Trent =

The following people, military units, and groups have received the honorary freedom of Stoke-on-Trent.

== Individuals ==
- Sir Stanley Matthews: 25 July 1963.
- George Stevenson: 2006.
- Robbie Williams: 2 July 2014.
- Neil Baldwin: 16 October 2014.
- Gordon Banks: 16 October 2014.

== Military units ==
- The Queen's Royal Lancers: 4 December 2013.

== Organizations and groups ==
- Stoke City Football Club: 4 December 2013
- Port Vale Football Club: 5 June 2025
