= Philip Burton (theatre director) =

Welsh radio producer (1904–1995)

Philip Burton MBE
- Burton at an AMDA benefit in 1964
- Born: Philip Henry Burton; 30 November 1904; Mountain Ash, Glamorgan, Wales
- Died: 28 January 1995 (aged 90); Haines City, Florida, United States
- Occupations: Teacher, theatre director, producer, writer

Philip Henry Burton MBE (30 November 1904 – 28 January 1995) was a Welsh teacher of English, who became an acclaimed radio producer and theatre director. In his later life, he emigrated to the United States where he helped found the American Musical and Dramatic Academy in New York City. Despite Burton's successes in many fields, it is for his role in helping his one-time pupil Richard Burton to pursue his career as an actor, that he is best remembered.

== Early history ==
Philip Henry Burton was born in 1904 in Mountain Ash, Glamorgan, South Wales. His father, Henry, was English, and came to Wales to work as a collier, but died in a pit accident when Burton was 14. Burton's mother, Emma Matilda, was Welsh and was a large influence in his academic achievement, as was his Maths teacher, Ted Richards. He attended Caegarw Elementary School then Mountain Ash Intermediate School. Aged just 16, Burton gained a scholarship to study at the University College of Wales, Cardiff, from where he graduated in 1925 with a double honours degree in History and Mathematics. His years in Mountain Ash and Cardiff are described in the first two chapters of his autobiography, Early Doors. Burton's first experiences as a schoolboy of performance came through the chapel and from the touring companies that played at Mountain Ash's two theatres. In Cardiff, he went frequently to the city's theatres, but took no part in the college's Dramatic Society. He played rugby for the college.

After leaving university, Burton became a teacher at the Port Talbot Secondary School, where he taught English (and, briefly, Games and Maths) and developed the school's drama activities. He also taught for the Workers' Educational Association and chaired the Port Talbot branch of the YMCA, as well as founding its Drama Society. He was a leading light as an actor in the Society, both in its Port Talbot productions and in drama competitions, and he was soon attracting attention in the national press: his portrayal of Othello was “perfect in make-up, appearance and art…Othello had a tremendous personality. There was action in every muscle. He was the only true Othello I ever saw…whose noble bearing and character personified manhood at its best.”

Burton's first play for the BBC, Granton Street, his first feature, Margam Abbey, and his first appearance as an actor, in Antigone, were all broadcast in 1937, the last two being produced by T. Rowland Hughes, a features producer with the BBC in Cardiff. Four more programmes with Hughes came in 1938 and 1939, and then Burton continued, both as a scriptwriter and actor, to work with Hughes throughout the War years.

Burton was a prolific scriptwriter for the BBC. Between 1937 and 1953, he wrote some forty-five radio scripts, as well as fourteen scripts for television. Most of the radio scripts were written whilst he was in full-time work, either as a teacher (1937-1945) or features producer (1945-1952).

In 1938 Burton was awarded a scholarship by the Guild of Graduates of the University of Wales to visit America for six months to study school camps and drama, broadcasting and theatre.

During the Second World War, Burton was Commanding Officer (eventually Acting Flight Lieutenant) of the Port Talbot ATC, 499 Squadron, for which he was appointed a Member of the Order of the British Empire (MBE) in the 1944 New Year Honours.

== Relationship with Richard Burton ==
Philip Burton had a frustrated dream of being an actor, and as a teacher looked for a young protégé through whom he could achieve acting success. He found such a talent in Owen Jones, who went on to appear in films during the 1930s as well as appearing on stage in Hamlet with Laurence Olivier. Jones, an RAF pilot, died through an illness after an accident at his airbase, which left Burton heartbroken. The arrival of a new young talent, Richard Jenkins, brought Burton fresh hope. He tutored Jenkins intensively in school subjects, and also worked at developing his accent and acting voice, including outdoor voice drills which improved his projection. Jenkins called the experience "the most hardworking and painful period" in his life. Burton failed in his attempt to adopt Jenkins, but nonetheless Jenkins became his legal ward and took his surname to become Richard Burton.

The two remained close for almost all of their lives and when Burton began working for the BBC as a producer, Richard would often lend his vocal talents. For the BBC they worked together on the radio plays The Corn is Green (1945) and The Last Days of Dolwyn (1949). Later when Burton had moved to New York, Richard called him at short notice to direct the first production of Camelot, after its original director, Moss Hart, was taken ill. The production was a huge success by the time it reached Broadway. The only time the two fell out was when Richard left his first wife, Sybil Christopher, for the actress Elizabeth Taylor; Philip Burton saw Sybil and the two children as his family. They reconciled, four years later, when Taylor approached Burton to help Richard, who was struggling in the build-up to John Gielgud's 1964 production of Hamlet. After Richard Burton's death in 1984, Taylor maintained the friendship with Burton, including visiting him in hospital during the long illness before his death.

== Later career ==
Burton left Port Talbot Secondary school in 1945, perhaps disappointed that he was not appointed to the headship of the school. He was by now an experienced scriptwriter and actor on both the stage and the radio, and had also gained experience in radio production when he was called upon to help the ailing T. Rowland Hughes in the studio. It came as no surprise when he succeeded Hughes as a features producer within an expanding Wales Region for the BBC. In 1947 he produced Dylan Thomas' radio feature on Swansea, Return Journey. He then worked closely with Thomas on the first half of a work initially titled The Town that was Mad. The play would eventually become Thomas' masterpiece, Under Milk Wood.

Philip Burton left the BBC in Wales in 1949 when he was promoted to Chief Instructor at the BBC Staff Training School in London. The following year, he was appointed to the Welsh committee of the Arts Council.

He resigned from the BBC in 1952 to become a freelancer. One of his first contracts was to write the first twelve episodes of The Appleyards, the first ever soap opera on BBC television. Freelancing also gave Burton more time for return trips to America.

In 1954, the year after Dylan Thomas' death, the first British production of Under Milk Wood was performed, on BBC Radio. Richard Burton took the lead as First Voice, Philip Burton took the role of the Reverend Eli Jenkins and Sybil Williams (Richard Burton's wife) played Myfanwy Price.

Later that year, Burton moved to New York City, where he helped establish the American Musical and Dramatic Academy and became its first director. He also set up a touring company, the Philip Burton Drama Quartet. Burton soon became a popular figure on the American lecture circuit, and published two books on Shakespeare, The Sole Voice: Character Portraits from Shakespeare and You, My Brother.

Burton was gay and had at least one long term relationship while in the US. Burton had become an American citizen in 1964, and in the 1970s went to live in Key West, Florida, where he continued his programme of talks and lectures, as well as taking an active part in Key West community activities. He died in Haines City, Florida on the 28 January 1995.

In 2025 Angela V John published a biography of Burton "Behind the Scenes" for Parthian Books.

On 10 November 2025, the centenary of the birth of Richard Burton, a blue plaque was unveiled at the Port Talbot house where the Burtons lived.

== Works by Philip Burton ==
=== Books and articles ===
- Untitled, Dylan Thomas Memorial Number (1953), Adam International Review, and also in E. Tedlock (1960) Dylan Thomas : The Legend and the Poet, Heinemann.
- Early Doors: My Life and the Theatre (1969), Dial Press.
- The Sole Voice: Character Portraits from Shakespeare (1970), Dial Press.
- You, My Brother (1973), Random House.
- The Green Isle (1974) Dial Press.
- Richard and Philip:The Burtons (1992), Owen.
- Dylan Thomas, in Dylan Remembered 1935-1953 pp236-238,(2004), ed. D.N. Thomas, Seren.

=== Audio ===
- The Dylan Thomas I Knew, (1991), Screen and Sound Archive, National Library of Wales (SSA/NLW).
- Dylan Thomas, (n.d.), original recordings, Colin Edwards archive, (SSA/NLW).

=== Published plays ===
- White Collar: A Play in Three Acts (1938), W. H. Smith.
- Granton Street: A Play in Three Acts (1934), F.S. Powell, re-published in 2017 by Alun Books, with an Introduction by A. V. John.

=== BBC radio and television scripts ===
- See BBC Genome at Philip Burton BBC

== Portrayals ==
In 2025, Mr Burton, a British biographical drama film starring Harry Lawtey as the young Richard Burton and Toby Jones as Philip Burton was released.

== Bibliography ==
- Alpert, H. (1986) Burton, Putnam.
- Bragg, M. (1988) Richard Burton: A Life, Little Brown.
- Callard, D. (1997) The Other Philip Burton in Planet, 122.
- Cleverdon, D. (1969). The Growth of Milk Wood. New Directions Publishing. ISBN 9780811217682.
- Davies, John; Jenkins, Nigel; Menna, Baines; Lynch, Peredur I., eds. (2008). The Welsh Academy Encyclopaedia of Wales. Cardiff: University of Wales Press. ISBN 978-0-7083-1953-6.
- John, A.V. (2015) The Actors’ Crucible: Port Talbot and the Making of Burton, Hopkins, Sheen and All the Others, Parthian.
- John, A.V. (2018) Philip Henry Burton, in The Dictionary of Welsh Biography online at Philip Burton NLW
- Thomas, D.N. (2020) Under Milk Wood: A Play for Ears. Some reflections on T. Rowland Hughes, Philip Burton and Dylan Thomas, in the New Welsh Review, May, and also published online at https://sites.google.com/site/dylanthomasandnewquay/under-milk-wood-a-play-for-ears
