= Angela V. John =

Welsh historian and biographer

- Occupations: History professor and biographer
- Employer: University of Greenwich
- Known for: biographies of women and Welsh figures
- Website: www.angelavjohn.com

Angela V. John FRHistS FLSW is a Welsh historian known for her biographies, particularly of Welsh men and women. She is President of Llafur: The Welsh People's History Society.

== Life ==
John was born and brought up in Port Talbot.

Her 1980 book By The Sweat of Their Brow concerned the lives of women employed in the Victorian coal mining industry. In the late 1980s she was one of the founders of the academic journal Gender & History.

From 1989 until 2004, she was History Professor at the University of Greenwich, which she gave up to concentrate full-time on her writing.

She began to research the life of war correspondent Henry W Nevinson at the Bodleian Library in Oxford. And published his biography, War, Journalism and the Shaping of the 20th Century: The Life and Times of Henry W Nevinson in 2006. Writing about his life led to John's interest in the suffragist Evelyn Sharp, who became Nevinson's second wife. In 2009 John published her biography: Evelyn Sharp: Rebel Woman, 1869-1955.

In 2012 when she was an honorary Professor of History at Swansea University she was elected to the Learned Society of Wales.

In 2013 she published Turning the Tide, a biography of the suffragette Margaret Haig Thomas, later Lady Rhondda. This led to her working with Welsh National Opera on their production of Rhondda Rips It Up! a music-hall based work by Elena Langer on Lady Rhondda, which premiered in Newport in May 2018 and toured to sixteen British venues.

In 2015 she published a book based around the many famous actors from around her home town. The book was inspired by a conversation she had with the actor Michael Sheen. The book is titled The Actors’ Crucible: Port Talbot and the Making of Burton, Hopkins, Sheen and All the Others.

In 2022 she succeeded the politician Hywel Francis as President of Llafur: The Welsh People's History Society. She had been a member of the society since 1977, and had served as chair and as vice-president.

Behind the Scenes: The Dramatic Lives of Philip Burton, John's biography of Philip Burton was published in May 2025. Philip Burton is best remembered as the schoolmaster who mentored and transformed his pupil Richard Jenkins, into the actor known as Richard Burton. John was also an adviser on the 2025 biographical film Mr Burton, about Philip Burton.
