= Cheryl Krasnick Warsh =

Canadian historian and writer

Cheryl Krasnick Warsh is a Canadian historian who has contributed to the field of medical and social history, particularly focusing on gender and health. She completed her undergraduate studies at Western University and earned her graduate degrees from Queen's University. Warsh is a professor at Vancouver Island University. and has been recognized as a Fellow of the Royal Society of Canada for her academic achievements. In addition, she is an editor of Gender & History.

== Works ==
- Warsh, Cheryl Krasnick (1999-01-01). Women's Health in North America, 1800-2000. Garamond Press. ISBN 978-1-55111-455-2.
- Warsh, Cheryl Krasnick (2011-07-01). Gender, Health, and Popular Culture. Waterloo, Ont: Wilfrid Laurier University Press. ISBN 978-1-55458-217-4.
- Malleck, Dan; Warsh, Cheryl Krasnick (February 2022). Pleasure and Panic. Vancouver; Toronto: UBC Press. ISBN 978-0-7748-6751-1. OCLC 1276933429.
- Warsh, Cheryl Krasnick (2024). "Negotiating Washington, 1966–1982". Frances Oldham Kelsey, the FDA, and the Battle against Thalidomide. Oxford University PressNew York. pp. 209–223. doi:10.1093/oso/9780197632543.003.0016. ISBN 978-0-19-763254-3.
- Warsh, Cheryl Krasnick (2024-03-15). Frances Oldham Kelsey, the FDA, and the Battle Against Thalidomide. New York: Oxford University Press. ISBN 978-0-19-763254-3.
