= Neil Baldwin (Keele University) =

British clown and writer on employment opportunities for the disabled

Neil Baldwin BEM
- Born: 15 March 1946 (age 80); Newcastle-under-Lyme, Staffordshire, England
- Other name: Nello
- Education: Honorary graduate of Keele University
- Occupations: Registered clown; Kit-man at Stoke City Football Club
- Television: BBC biographical film Marvellous (2014)
- Parent(s): Harry and Mary Baldwin

Neil "Nello" Baldwin BEM (born 15 March 1946) is an honorary graduate of Keele University from Westlands in Newcastle-under-Lyme, Staffordshire, England. He is a registered clown and also worked for Stoke City Football Club, for whom he once played briefly in a friendly match. He is the subject of an award-winning BBC television drama, Marvellous, which was broadcast in 2014, and a play of the same name which was performed in London's West End in 2022.

== Personal life ==
Born to Harry and Mary Baldwin on 15 March 1946, he was diagnosed with a learning disability as a child and required speech therapy. Baldwin left school at age 16 to join Sir Robert Fossett's Circus, the oldest circus in England, for whom he performed as Nello the Clown for three seasons. He lived with his mother until a few years before she died in 2003. He is known to be acquainted with an Archbishop of Canterbury, the footballer Gary Lineker, and Prince Edward.

== Keele University ==
Since 1960, unasked and unpaid, Baldwin has visited Keele University, where his mother worked as a cleaner, to greet new students. A testimonial football match, on 12 March 2000, featured his own team of Keele University students (the Neil Baldwin Football Club, formed in 1967, whose president was Gary Lineker) against an all-star side of former Football League players including Lou Macari, Asa Hartford and Gordon Cowans.

He was granted honorary life membership of Keele University Students' Union in 1968. The proposal received unanimous support. His fiftieth year there was marked with a two-day celebration, including a service of thanksgiving presided over by the Bishop of Lichfield, Keele alumnus Jonathan Gledhill, and a further testimonial match. He was also awarded honorary alumni-hood.

In 2013, Baldwin received the honorary degree of Master of the University from Keele University, which said that he

has been adopted by the student body over the last 50 years as something of a mascot for Keele... He has watched, supported and kept in touch with successive cohorts of Keele students building an impressive network of alumni contacts both national and internationally. He serves the students offering advice and support to students, remaining steadfastly proud and loyal to Keele. In doing so, he has openly defended Keele and voiced his concerns about any issue that has or would affect Keele to his numerous contacts within parliament, the various leaders of Christian denomination churches, volunteer organisations and business leaders across the country, of whom he regularly visits.

In 2016, Stoke City and Keele University combined to celebrate Neil Baldwin's 70th birthday at Keele Hall. Guests included friends and family, professional footballers and football administrators, members of the clergy, professional actors and screenwriters, impresarios of the circus, Keele University professors, students and graduates, local dignitaries, singers from the Neil Baldwin Choir, three Cambridge University Boat Club rowers, and members of the Neil Baldwin Football Club. Also included was a birthday greeting by video-link from Sir Alex Ferguson. Vice-chancellor Professor Trevor McMillan remarked that "Only Neil could bring together people from such diverse walks of life to celebrate his birthday".

== Stoke City ==
In the 1990s, Baldwin was appointed as Stoke City Football Club's kit-man by then manager Lou Macari who has described him as "the best signing I ever made", as his humour was so good for team morale. In 1993, Macari played him as a substitute for Stoke City, against Aston Villa, in the final five minutes of a testimonial match for Gordon Cowans. Macari later wrote seven pages about Baldwin in his 2009 autobiography, Football, My Life, and said that he is a "man without an angle and there aren't many of them in football". In May 2015, Baldwin was awarded "Supporter of the year" by Stoke City.

== Marvellous TV film ==
Baldwin is the subject of and also appeared as himself in Marvellous, an acclaimed 2014 biographical film in which he is played by Toby Jones, whom The Guardian praised for his "lovely, very human, performance". It was first broadcast on BBC Two on 25 September 2014. Reviewing it for the Stoke Sentinel, John Woodhouse said:

It says everything for Neil that Marvellous was ever made. For in times when TV is seduced by vacuity and celebrity, it doesn't sound that promising a pitch. A drama, set in Newcastle [under-Lyme], about a man saddled with the tag of "learning difficulties" who reveals himself to be so much more? Good luck with that one. And yet here it is – primetime BBC2.

The film won the 2015 British Academy Television Award for "Best Single Drama", and Gemma Jones won the award for Best Supporting Actress for her portrayal of Baldwin's mother. Jones was nominated for the Best Actor award for his performance. Baldwin collected the drama award trophy during the ceremony at the Theatre Royal on Drury Lane, and made an acceptance speech.

== Marvellous book ==
Baldwin's autobiography, Marvellous: Neil Baldwin – My Story, written with the help of Keele University alumni Malcolm Clarke and Francis Beckett, was published in hardback by John Blake in August 2015.

== Marvellous play ==
A stage version of Baldwin's story premiered in March 2022 at the New Vic Theatre in Newcastle-under-Lyme and, later that year, transferred to @sohoplace in London's West End.

== Other honours ==
On 21 May 2015, Baldwin was presented with the Freedom of Stoke-on-Trent and on 26 November 2015 was awarded the freedom of Newcastle-under-Lyme. In October 2015, he featured in an episode of the BBC television programme Songs of Praise.

Baldwin was awarded a British Empire Medal (BEM) in the 2019 New Year Honours "for services to the community in Newcastle-Under-Lyme, Staffordshire".
