= Bonekickers =

BBC drama

- From left to right: Prof Gregory Parton (Hugh Bonneville), Dr Gillian Magwilde (Julie Graham) and Viv Davis (Gugu Mbatha-Raw), Foreground: Dr Ben Ergha (Adrian Lester)
- Genre: Drama
- Created by: Matthew Graham; Ashley Pharoah
- Starring: Julie Graham; Gugu Mbatha-Raw; Adrian Lester; Hugh Bonneville; Michael Maloney
- Country of origin: United Kingdom
- Original language: English
- No. of series: 1
- No. of episodes: 6

Production
- Running time: 57 minutes
- Production company: Mammoth Screen

Original release
- Network: BBC One
- Release: 8 July – 12 August 2008

Bonekickers is a BBC six-part television drama about a team of archaeologists, set at the fictional Wessex University. It made its début on 8 July 2008 and ran for one series.

It was written by Life on Mars and Ashes to Ashes creators Matthew Graham and Ashley Pharoah. It was produced by Michele Buck and Damien Timmer of Mammoth Screen Ltd and co-produced with Monastic Productions. Archaeologist and Bristol University academic Mark Horton acted as the series' archaeological consultant. Adrian Lester has described the programme as "CSI meets Indiana Jones [...] There's an element of the crime procedural show, there's science, conspiracy theories—and there's a big underlying mystery that goes through the whole six-episode series."

Much of the series was filmed in the City of Bath, Somerset, with locations including the University of Bath campus (which does not offer Archaeology courses). Additional locations included Brean Down Fort and Kings Weston House (both for episode 2), Chavenage House for episodes 5 & 6 and Sheldon Manor.

On 21 November 2008 the BBC stated the show would not be returning for a second series.

== Characters ==
- Dr Gillian Magwilde – the team's head archaeologist, played by Julie Graham.
- Vivienne "Viv" Davis – young and promising archaeologist, played by Gugu Mbatha-Raw.
- Dr Ben Ergha – a young, established archaeologist, played by Adrian Lester.
- Professor Gregory "Dolly" Parton – the experienced and older male archaeologist, played by Hugh Bonneville. .
- Professor Daniel Mastiff – played by Michael Maloney.

== Episodes ==
No.	Title	Directed by	Written by	Original release date	Viewers (millions)
1	"Army of God"	James Strong	Matthew Graham	8 July 2008	6.99
Developers discover an Arab coin (dirhem) on ground marked for a housing development. The archaeological team find this mysterious as the site is a very long way from the Crusades. The subsequent adventure involves modern Knights Templar, a fanatically racist Christian evangelist and the True Cross. Guest cast: Paul Rhys, Paul Nicholls
2	"Warriors"	James Strong	Ashley Pharoah	15 July 2008	5.23
When the bodies of presumed slaves are found in the Bristol Channel, matters take a turn for the worse for the team as they encounter a conspiracy involving Maroons, the Siege of Yorktown and a man intending to be the first black President of America. Guest cast: Benjamin Whitrow, William Hope, Eamonn Walker, Doreen Mantle, Frances Tomelty
3	"The Eternal Fire"	Sarah O'Gorman	Matthew Graham	22 July 2008	4.67
After tremors can be felt through an ancient Roman Bath site, the team go to check what is causing it. This leads to the discovery of the true arsonist, responsible for the Great Fire of Rome, and to a love affair concerning Boudica herself. Guest cast: Shauna Macdonald
4	"The Cradle of Civilisation"	James Strong	Matthew Graham	29 July 2008	4.25
Kahmil Hammadi, an Iraqi archaeologist and Gillian's former love interest, arrives in Bath with a cultural delegation to reclaim a Babylonian relic looted during the Iraq war. Gillian is suspicious of Hammadi, believing he has a different reason for visiting, and her suspicions are further aroused when an antiquities dealer is found murdered. Guest cast: Silas Carson, Darrell D'Silva, Vicky Hall, Matt Rippy, David Ryall, Nina Sosanya, Frances Tomelty
5	"The Lines of War"	Nick Hurran	Tom MacRae	5 August 2008	3.94
A British First World War tank containing the burnt remains of six bodies is uncovered in France, as the team of archaeologists uncover another compelling mystery. The tank has been buried since 1917 and the discovery ignites an international archaeological feud between Professor Gillian Magwilde and her German counterpart, Dr Becker, while bureaucratic French official Monsieur Luc struggles to remain neutral. Guest cast: James D'Arcy, Burn Gorman, Adam James, Patrick Monckeberg, Gabrielle Scharnitzky, Philippe Smolikowski, Sam Spiegel, Frances Tomelty
6	"Follow the Gleam"	Iain B. MacDonald	Matthew Graham	12 August 2008	4.38
Professor Gillian Magwilde risks her reputation, friendships and even her life on a quest for her deepest obsession, Excalibur, the greatest sword in history, in the final episode of the series. This obsession is steeped in Arthurian legend and the poetry of Tennyson, and it drove Gillian's mother, Karen, mad. Now Gillian needs to end this quest. She must come to terms with her relationship with Viv and the mysterious man who has been trying to contact her, Henry Timberdyne. Guest cast: Jeremy Bulloch, Dexter Fletcher, Tobias Menzies, Vicky Hall, Frances Tomelty, Rick Warden, David Oakes

== Reception ==
=== Ratings ===
According to unofficial figures, the first episode of the series was watched by 6.8 million viewers, achieving a 31% audience share. This fell to 5.2 million viewers with a 24.3% share in the second week, and 4.6 million with a 21% share in the third. And week four fell again to 4.2 million, a 20% share. Week five dropped to 3.8 million. The final episode saw a slight increase in viewers to 4.3 million.

=== First night reviews ===
The series debuted to broadly negative reviews. The Guardian's Gareth McLean described the show as "mind-bogglingly dreadful", with "lame characters delivering abysmal lines", David Chater of The Times thought it "rubbish", and The Independent's Thomas Sutcliffe found it laughable and full of absurdities, while also observing that "Professor Magwilde's approach to archaeology is unconventional. She likes to squat at the edge of the trench and mutter urgently, 'Come on! Give up your secrets!'" In BBC Two's Newsnight Review, the author Kate Mosse asserted it would be "great for teenagers", while the academic and critic Sarah Churchwell said the "execution [was] appalling" and that it was "beyond silly"; John Mullan likewise criticised the show's absurdities, saying that "Hokum has to have its own logic". The New Statesman described it as "dramatic goo". Some reviews were slightly more positive - Patricia Wynn Davies of The Telegraph wrote that while lacking in subtlety, the episode had an "action-packed conclusion", and Lucy Mangan in the Guardian criticised the episode as "arrant nonsense" and "a clattering bag of madness" and found its characters too "shouty", but praised Paul Rhys and overall concluded that the episode was "utterly bonkers but curiously satisfying" and that, as for the series, "keeping the faith for a few more weeks might well pay off".

=== Academic reception ===
In line with the broadly negative reviews, the reception amongst the academic community was mixed, with different complaints around technical accuracy.

=== Viewer complaints ===
A scene in the first episode which depicted a Muslim's beheading by an extremist Christian drew 100 complaints. The BBC expressed "regret" that some viewers had found the scene "inappropriate", but defended the decision to show it.

== See also ==
- Bones (TV series)
- Relic Hunter
- Veritas: The Quest
