= Harry Lawtey =

English actor (born 1996)

- Born: October 26, 1996 (age 29); Oxford, Oxfordshire, England
- Education: Sylvia Young Theatre School; Drama Centre London
- Occupation: Actor
- Years active: 2012–present

Harry Lawtey (born 26 October 1996) is a British actor. He is known for his role in the drama series Industry (2020–2024). He also played Harvey Dent in the film Joker: Folie à Deux (2024).

== Early life ==
Lawtey was born in Oxford, while his father, a military aircraft engineer, was stationed at RAF Brize Norton. His parents were childhood sweethearts from the Northern town Barton-upon-Humber, where much of his extended family still lives. Lawtey has said of his parents’ hometown: “I have never lived in the place that I feel as though I’m from.” He has an older brother, George, who is a first-team coach for Swansea City AFC.

Lawtey and his family moved to Cyprus when he was 4 years old. A touring production of Oliver! that played at a local Cypriot amphitheatre when Lawtey was 13 inspired him to pursue acting. While on holiday back in England, he auditioned for the Sylvia Young Theatre School, which he attended as a boarding student, staying with a host family in Abbey Wood alongside four other boys. He then completed his A-levels at Hurtwood House in 2015. He went on to graduate from the Drama Centre London in 2018.

== Career ==
Lawtey began his career with guest appearances in episodes of the CBBC series Wizards vs Aliens and the BBC One medical soap opera Casualty. In 2016, he made his feature film debut in the crime thriller City of Tiny Lights as Charlie Benson. He played Andrew in the second series of the ITV noir detective series Marcella in 2018.

In 2020, Lawtey began starring as Robert Spearing in the BBC Two and HBO series Industry. He also appeared in an episode of the Netflix fantasy series The Letter for the King. This was followed by a small role as Bobby Andrews in Terence Davies' Benediction in 2021.

Lawtey played Cadet Artemis Marquis in the 2022 mystery film The Pale Blue Eye, which had a wide release on Netflix. He also appeared in the ITV romantic-comedy drama You & Me and Todd Phillips' Joker: Folie à Deux. In 2025, as young Richard Burton, he co-starred with Toby Jones in the biographical film Mr Burton. He will next appear in the biographical film Words of War.

== Acting credits ==
Key
†	Denotes films that have not yet been released

=== Film ===
Year	Title	Role	Notes	Ref.
2016	City of Tiny Lights	Charlie Benson		
2021	Benediction	Bobby Andrews		
2022	The Pale Blue Eye	Artemus Marquis		
2024	Joker: Folie à Deux	Harvey Dent		
2025	Mr Burton	Richard Burton		
2025	Words of War	Ilya Politkovsky		
2028	The Beatles – A Four-Film Cinematic Event †	Stuart Sutcliffe	Filming	
TBA	Billion Dollar Spy †	Tom Lenihan	Post-production	
TBA	Brides †	Vova	Filming	

=== Television ===
Year	Title	Role	Notes	Ref.
2012	Wizards vs Aliens	Young Mark	Episode: "Dawn of the Nekross, Part 1"	
2013	Casualty	Jay Green	Episode: "Away in a Manger"	
2015	Chuggington		Voice role; episodes: "Skipper Stu and the Steam Crane", "Koko Express"	
2018	Marcella	Andrew	3 episodes	
2020	The Letter for the King	Maurice	Episode: "Isn't She a Sweetheart?"	
2020–2024	Industry	Robert Spearing	Main cast	
2022	Magpie Murders	Robert Blakiston	6 episodes	
2023	You & Me	Ben	Main cast	
2026	Under Salt Marsh	Dylan Rees	Main cast	

=== Theatre ===
Year	Title	Role	Notes	Ref.
2018	The Country Wife	Dorilant	Chichester Festival Theatre	
2019	Gently Down the Stream	Harry	Park Theatre, London	
