= Wiveton Hall =

Grade II listed country house in Norfolk, England

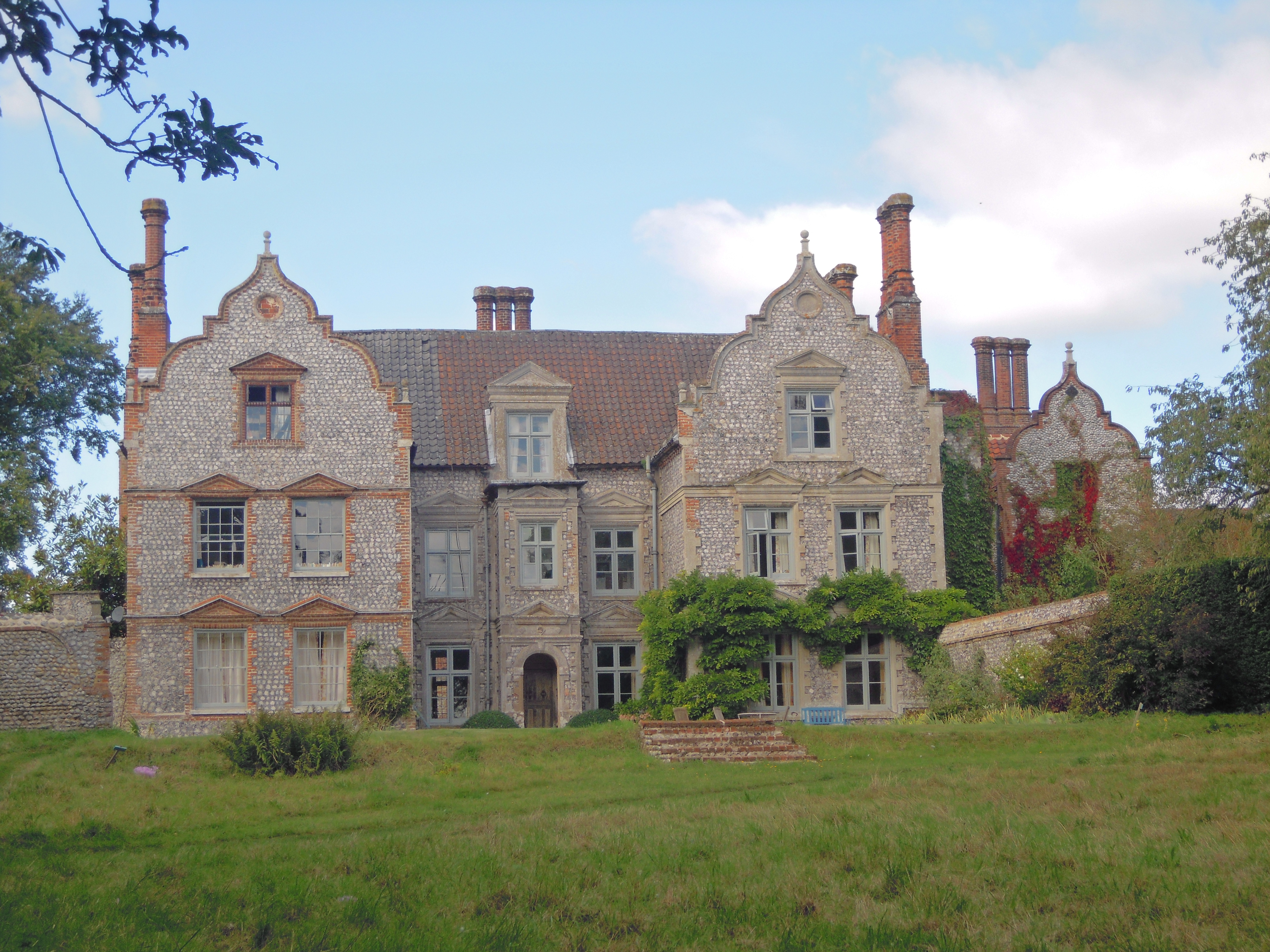
- Interactive map of the Wiveton Hall area

General information
- Location: Wiveton, NR25 7TE, England
- Coordinates: 52.9551°N 1.0342°E
- Current tenants: MacCarthy

Website
- http://www.wivetonhall.co.uk/

Wiveton Hall is a country house in Wiveton, Norfolk, England. It is Grade II* listed. It was built in 1652 and extended in 1908. However there are remains of an older building in the garden which could date back to 1280. It was the residence of many notable people over the next three centuries and is now the home of the MacCarthy family. The Hall provides holiday cottage accommodation, a restaurant café, a farm and gift shop and has garden tours. The West Wing is available for weddings and other special events.

It was the setting for the observational documentary Normal for Norfolk.

== Early residents ==
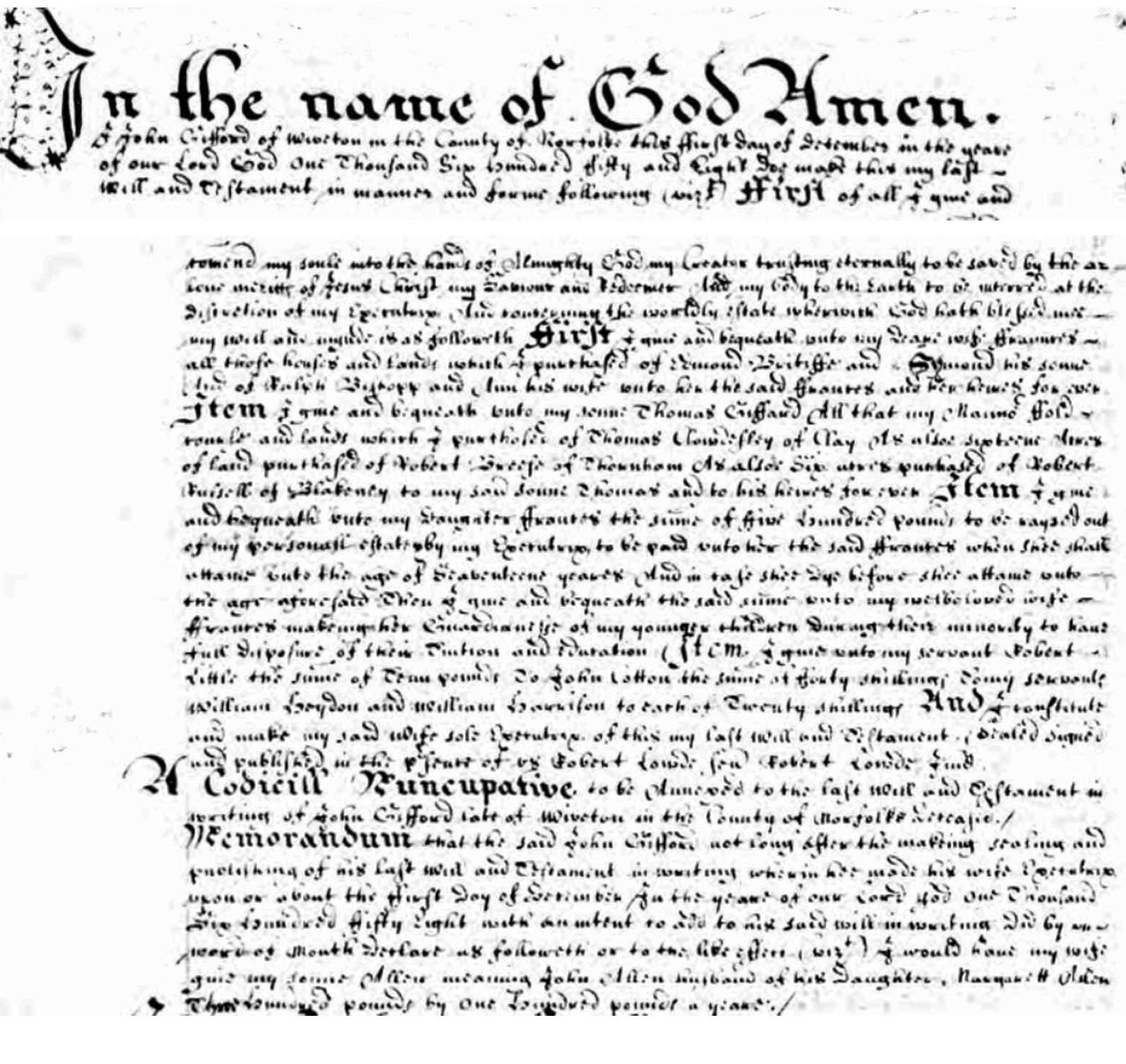
Will of John Gifford proved in 1661.

John Gifford (sometimes spelt Giffard) built Wiveton Hall in about 1652. There are two pieces of evidence which reveal the age of the building – a garden door dated 1652 and the date 1653 on the door from the hall to the garden. This door also bears a brass plate with the initials J. F. G. linked by a knot. These initials appear to stand for John and Frances Gifford. John who is referred to in some historical texts as "John Gifford the younger of Gloucester" was the son of a wealthy merchant. The historian Nick Poyntz has identified him as a person who was involved in an historical incident in 1642. He says he was a wealthy man who owned Barton House in Cirencester, Gloucestershire and in 1647 stood for election to Parliament. After his interests in some iron works in the Forest of Dean foundered he decided to move to Norfolk and bought from Edmund Britiffe the Wiveton Estate. He mentions Edmund Britiffe in his will. He may have moved here to become involved in trade as it this time the ports of Blakeney and Cley were thriving.

In about 1624 he married in Gloucester Frances Poyntz the daughter of Sir John Poyntz. In his will which was proved in 1661 John left the Wiveton estate to her and other property in Cley and Blakeney to his son Thomas. A photo of his grave in Wiveton Church showing his coat of arms can be seen at this reference.

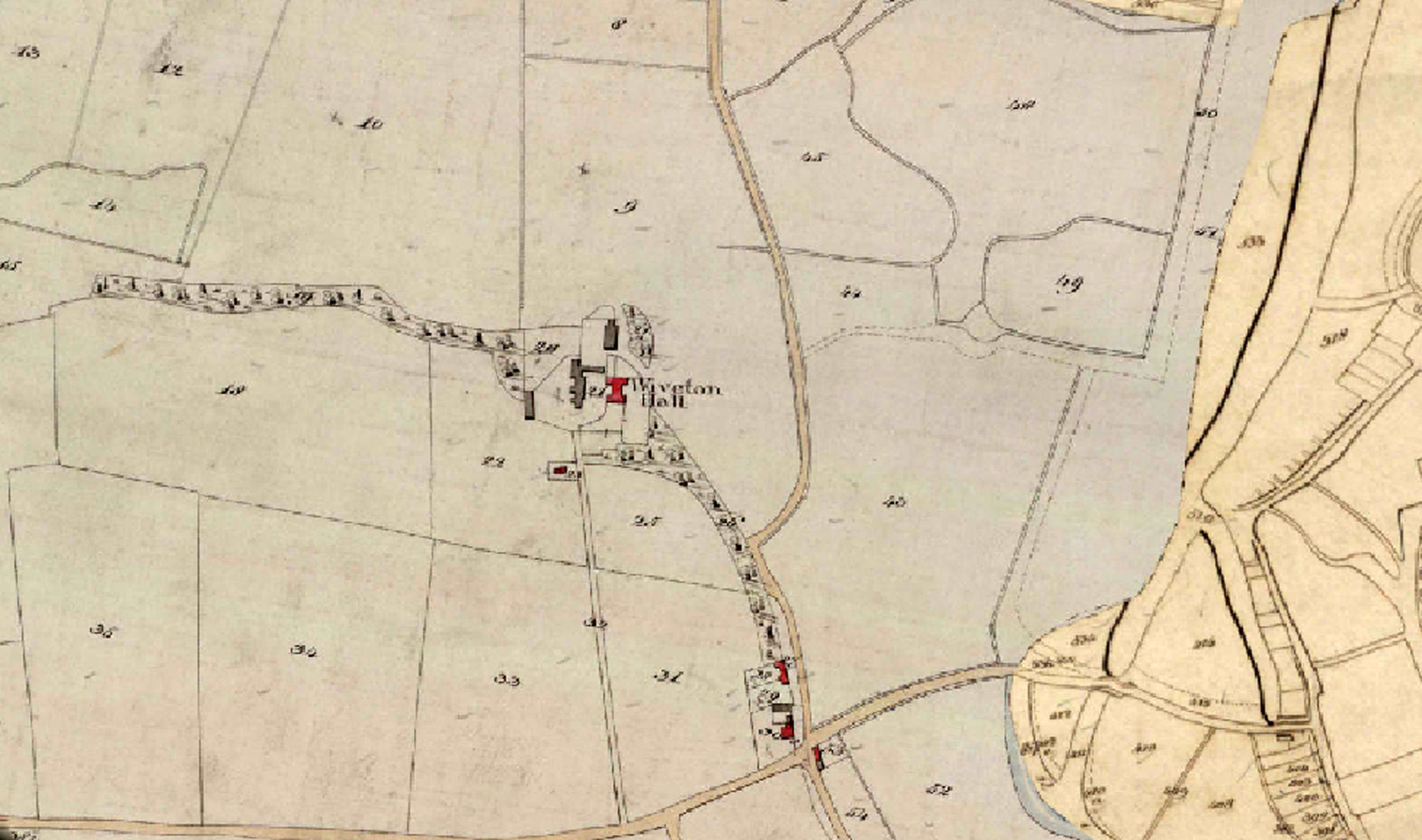
Map of Wiveton Hall in 1843

During the 1700s it is possible that the house was owned by the Garrett family who have memorial inscriptions in Wiveton Church. In his will William Garrett who died in 1786 mentions that he owned the “mansion house” at Wiveton. He seems to have been living at the Hall with his sister Catherine Jennis and her friend Ann Fleming. William left a life interest in the house to both Catherine and Ann with appropriate income. Catherine died in 1787 and is buried with her parents at Wiveton and Ann died in 1795. There is a death notice in the “Gentleman’s Magazine” which says that Ann Fleming died at Wiveton Hall.

The house eventually passed to William Buck (1772-1845) of Morston. He was born in 1772. His father William Buck (1732-1823) was a wealthy estate owner in Morston. William (the younger) died in 1845 at the Wiveton Hall estate and there is a memorial inscription in the Church to him and his wife Mary Anne who died in 1861. Their son William Henry Gifford Buck inherited the hall.

== Later residents ==
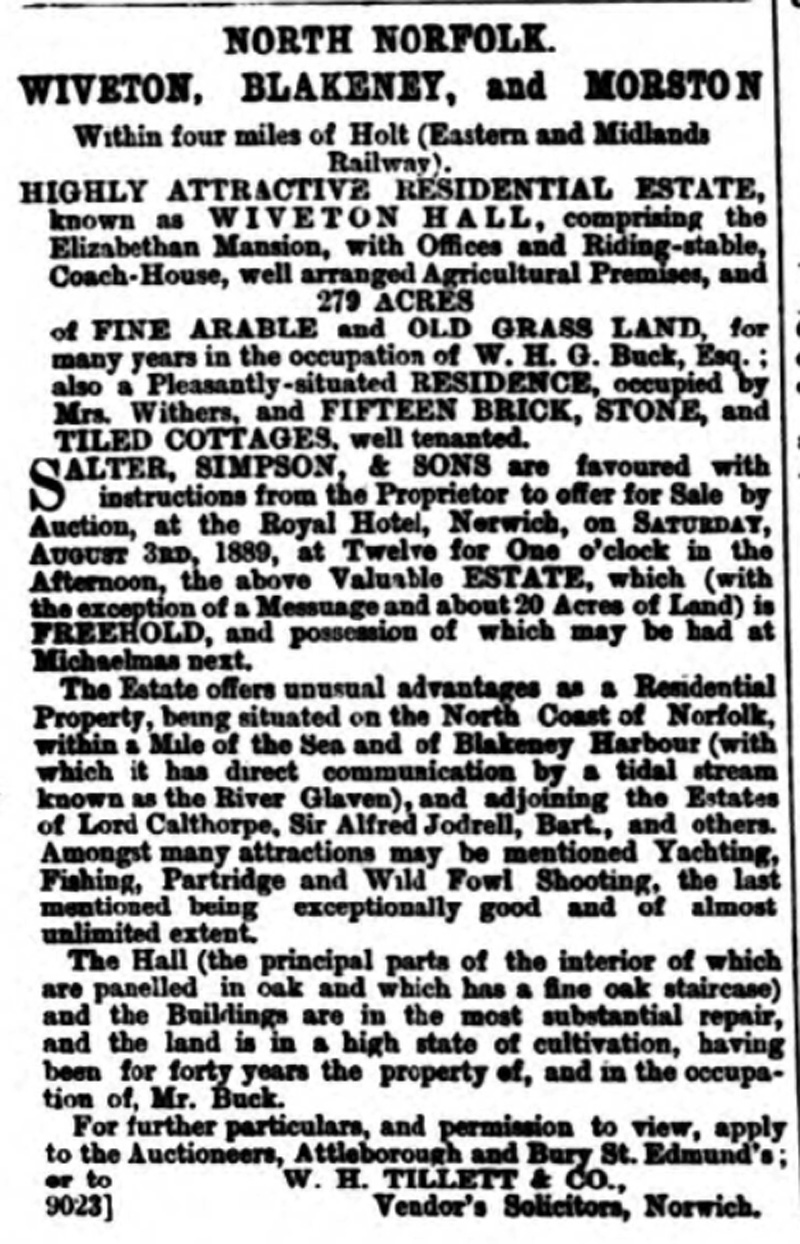
Ad for the Sale of Wiveton Hall in 1889

William Henry Gifford Buck (1825-1907) was born in 1825 in Morston. He was educated at the school in High Street, Walsingham and when he inherited the hall at the age of 20 he became a farmer cultivating 400 acres of the estate. In 1850 he married Sarah Miller Page who was the daughter of Christopher Thomas Page of Stiffkey, Norfolk. The couple had thirteen children, six sons and seven daughters. He lived with his family at Wiveton Hall and farmed the land for the next forty years.

In 1889 he placed an advertisement in the “Norfolk News” for the sale of the estate. The sale notice is shown. He did not sell it however and instead for the next fourteen years he leased the property sometimes renting the house and farm separately. From about 1890 until 1902 Stephen Barnabas Burroughs (1840-1919) tenanted the farm. He was the miller at Cley Windmill. The 1896 Kelly Directory shows that Herbert Ward, the African explorer, was the tenant of the Hall at about the same time.

In 1899 Stephen Burroughs invited an agricultural journalist to visit the farm and a detailed description of the place was published in the newspaper which can be read at this reference. Part of the article is as follows.

"Mr Burroughes farm is from 400 to 500 acres in extent including 100 acres of this marsh grazing land, an uncommonly pleasant and useful combination particularly as the two classes of land adjoin. Indeed I may say that a more pleasant general combination than this farm presents I have not had the honour to look over."

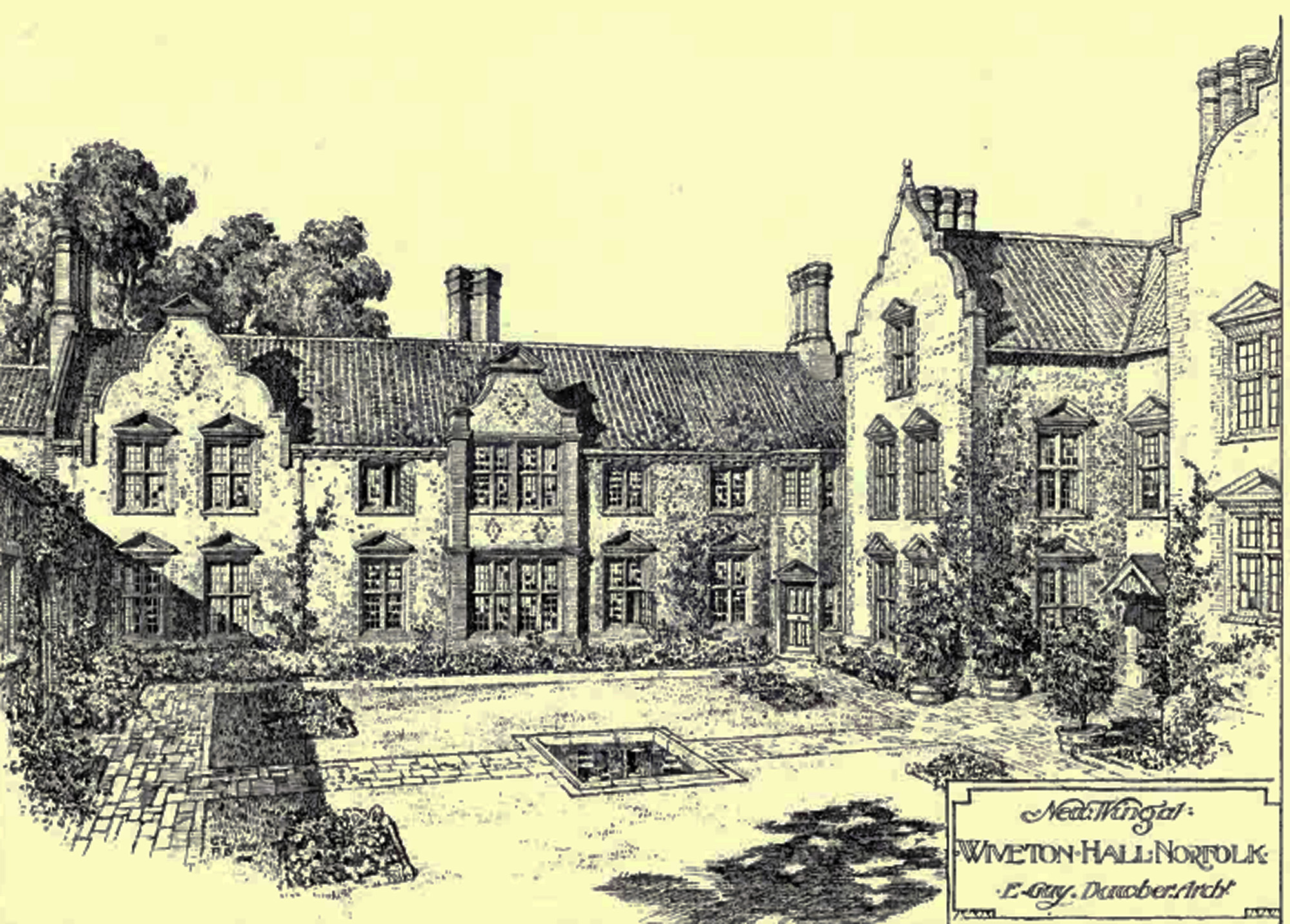
Architectural drawing by Sir Guy Dawber of Wiveton Hall

In 1903 both the hall and the farm were sold to Lieutenant Colonel Thomas Francis Archibald Watson-Kennedy (1856-1935). Thomas was born in 1856 in Jersey, the Channel Islands. His father was Lord Gilbert Kennedy (1822–1901). He joined the Black Watch in 1874 and served in Egypt in 1882-1884, the Sudan 1884 - 1885, the Nile Expedition, and South Africa. In 1897 he married the wealthy widow Ethel Mary Watson.

Ethel had been born Ethel Mary Fowler, daughter of a wealthy solicitor Robert Fowler. In 1886 she married the extremely wealthy yachtsman Sidney Clemens Watson who had been left a fortune by his father. They lived a very lavish lifestyle and owned several yachts. Sidney was a member of ten different yacht clubs. They had one child Lilian Mary Watson. In 1892 at the age of only 31 Sidney died and left his fortune to Ethel. She married Lieutenant Colonel Watson-Kennedy in 1897. The couple had no children but Ethel’s daughter Lilian from her first marriage lived with them.

In 1903 they bought Wiveton Hall and Ethel used her inheritance to make major changes to the property. They commissioned the famous architect Sir Guy Dawber to build the West Wing of Wiveton Hall. The structure was applauded by the architectural community at the time and the drawing (which is shown) was featured in several of their Journals. The Watson-Kennedy’s also made extensive additions to the garden planting many trees which survive today.

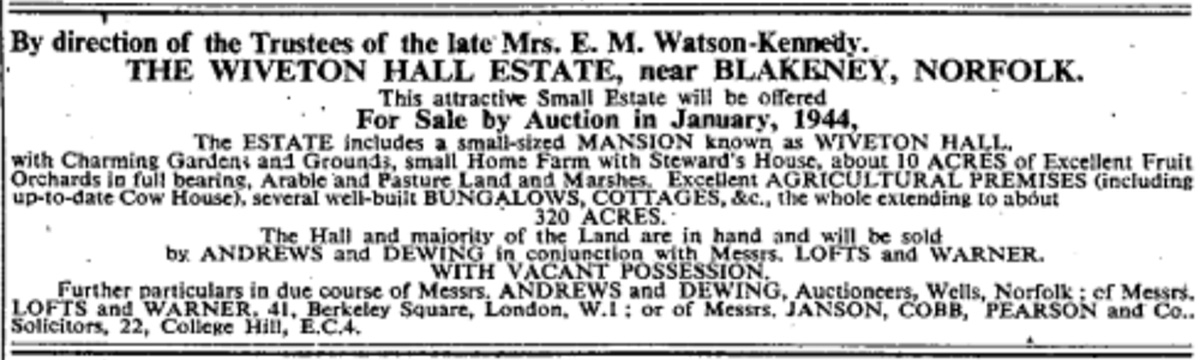
Ad for Wiveton Hall in 1943

Thomas died in 1935 at the Hall and Ethel died in 1943. In the same year the house was advertised for sale and in 1944 it was bought by the Buxton family. Richard Gurney Buxton (1887-1972) was born in 1887. He was the son of Samuel Gurney Buxton who owned Catton Hall near Norwich. In 1914 he married Mary Primrose Ralli (1894-1972). She was the daughter of Major Antonio Stephen Ralli of Stanhoe Hall. The couple had one child Pamela Chloe Buxton (1915-2018) (called Chloe).

In 1948 Chloe married Michael Desmond De La Chevallerie MacCarthy (1907-1973). He was the son of Sir Desmond MacCarthy and Mary Warre-Cornish (called Molly). Both of them were part of the "Bloomsbury Group" who were a group of associated English writers, intellectuals, philosophers and artists in the first half of the 20th century.

The Buxtons lived at Wiveton Hall until 1972 when they both died in the same year. It was then inherited by their grandson Desmond MacCarthy but as he was only 15 at the time his mother Chloe ran the farm until he could manage. He still lives in Wiveton Hall today.
