= James Strong (director) =

British television director and screenwriter

James Strong is a British television and film director and writer, best known for his work on Broadchurch for which he was BAFTA-nominated for Best Director Fiction 2015. He trained at Granada TV and has directed episodes of the shows Holby City and Doctors, as well as seven episodes of Doctor Who and two episodes of its spin-off series Torchwood. His work on the Doctor Who episode "Voyage of the Damned" won him a BAFTA Cymru award for Best Director in 2008. He also directed the 2024 Peabody Award winning series Mr Bates vs The Post Office.

== Professional ==
In 2007, he directed the autobiographical documentary Elton John: Me, Myself & I and in 2008 he directed three episodes of Bonekickers. He then directed Hunted and Best Possible Taste: The Kenny Everett Story and Silent Witness in 2010 followed by the feature film United and Downton Abbey in 2011. He was lead director and associate producer on Broadchurch, which won six BAFTAs including Best Drama and for which he was nominated for BAFTA Best Director Fiction.

Strong followed this with work on Series 2 of Broadchurch, the US remake Gracepoint in 2013 and other US pilots, including Kingmakers for ABC in 2015 and Drew in 2016. He also directed episodes of the Stephen King adaptation and J. J. Abrams produced 11.22.63.

He directed and executive produced "Liar" (2017) for ITV and AMC and the critically acclaimed mini-series Vanity Fair (2018) for ITV and Amazon Studios. He was also set to direct a J.R.R. Tolkien biopic entitled Middle Earth (later re-titled Tolkien), but dropped out for unknown reasons.

Strong directed the feature film Words of War about the late Russian journalist Anna Politkovskaya. The film features Maxine Peake as Politkovskaya, Jason Isaacs as her husband Sascha, and Ciarán Hinds as her Nobel Peace Prize-winning editor at the Novaya Gazeta, Dmitry Muratov. Variety reported that Words of War will be released in U.S. theaters starting on 2 May 2025.

== Selected filmography ==
- Doctors
  - Various episodes (2000–2001)
- Holby City
  - Various episodes (2002–2005)
- Doctor Who
  - "The Impossible Planet" (2006)
  - "The Satan Pit" (2006)
  - "Daleks in Manhattan" (2007)
  - "Evolution of the Daleks" (2007)
  - "Voyage of the Damned" (2007)
  - "Partners in Crime" (2008)
  - "Planet of the Dead" (2009)
- Torchwood
  - "Cyberwoman" (2006)
  - "They Keep Killing Suzie" (2006)
- Bonekickers
  - "Army of God" (2008)
  - "Warriors" (2008)
  - "The Cradle of Civilisation" (2008)
- Hustle
  - "Return of the Prodigal" (2009)
  - "New Recruits" (2009)
- Silent Witness
  - The Prodigal (2011)
- United (2011)
- Broadchurch (2013)
  - 5 episodes
- The Great Train Robbery (2013)
- From There to Here (2014)
- Code of a Killer (2014)
  - 2 episodes
- Gracepoint (2014)
  - "Episode One"
  - "Episode Two"
  - "Episode Four"
  - "Episode Five"
- Kingsmakers (2015)
- Drew (2016)
- 11.22.63 (2016)
  - "Episode Three"
  - "Episode Four"
- Doubt (2017)
  - "Then and Now"
- The Get (2017)
- Liar (2017–20)
  - "The Date"
  - "I Know You're Dying"
  - "The White Rabbit"
  - "Episode One"
  - "Episode Two"
  - "Episode Three"
  - "Episode Six"
- Council of Dads (2020)
  - "Pilot"
  - "I'm Not Fine"
- Crime (2021)
  - "Episode One"
  - "Episode Two"
  - "Episode Three"
- Vigil (2021)
  - "Episode One"
  - "Episode Two"
  - "Episode Three"
- The Suspect (2022)
  - "Episode One"
  - "Episode Two"
  - "Episode Three"
- Fire Country (2022)
  - "Pilot"
  - "Dirty Money"
  - "Goodbye for Now"
- Mr Bates vs The Post Office (2024)
- Words of War (2025)
- Sheriff Country (2025)
  - "Pilot"
