= Words of War =

Biographical film

- Theatrical release poster
- Directed by: James Strong
- Screenplay by: Eric Poppen
- Produced by: Miriam Segal; Mark Maxey; Sean Penn; Kia Jam
- Starring: Maxine Peake; Jason Isaacs; Ciarán Hinds; Ellie Bamber; Harry Lawtey; Naomi Battrick
- Cinematography: Mike Eley
- Edited by: David Charap
- Music by: Snorri Hallgrímsson
- Production companies: Rolling Pictures; Good Film Collective; K Jam Media
- Distributed by: Decal (United States); Signature Entertainment (United Kingdom)
- Release dates: May 2, 2025 (United States); June 27, 2025 (United Kingdom)
- Running time: 117 minutes
- Countries: United States; United Kingdom
- Language: English

Words of War is a 2025 biographical drama film about the late Russian journalist Anna Politkovskaya. Directed by James Strong, Maxine Peake as Politkovskaya, Jason Isaacs as her husband Alexander Politkovsky, and Ciarán Hinds as her Nobel Peace Prize–winning editor at the Novaya Gazeta, Dmitry Muratov.

== Synopsis ==
Anna Politkovskaya was a journalist and human rights activist who persisted with reporting on the conflict in Chechnya despite considerable danger to herself and tried to expose corruption within Russia under the governance of Vladimir Putin. She continued in the face of poisoning, intimidation and violence before being the victim of a contract killing in the elevator of her house on October 7, 2006.

== Cast ==
- Maxine Peake as Anna Politkovskaya
- Ciarán Hinds as Dmitry Muratov
- Jason Isaacs as Alexander Politkovsky
- Naomi Battrick as Vera Politkovskaya
- Harry Lawtey as Ilya Politkovsky
- Ellie Bamber as Elena Milashina
- Fady Elsayed as Anzor

== Production ==
The project was announced as Mother Russia at the 2022 Cannes Film Festival with Maxine Peake, Jason Isaacs, and Ciarán Hinds attached to the main roles. The film had James Strong attached as director, working from a screenplay by Eric Poppen, with filming scheduled for UK and Latvia in 2022.

In December 2022, it was announced by Deadline Hollywood that Good Films Collective had teamed with Burbank-based Rolling Pictures on the production. Producers were listed as Miriam Segal and Mark Maxey. Principal photography was revealed to have commenced in Latvia, with filming scheduled to last into February 2023.

In 2024, Sean Penn joined the project as an executive producer.

=== Casting ===
In September 2022, Emma D'Arcy, Harry Lawtey and Ellie Bamber were added to the cast. Lawtey confirmed his role as Anna Politkovskaya's son and discussed the film within a geo-political context saying "The film has been planned for years and obviously now it has unfortunately become too relevant...being part of a project that feels current and meaningful is a privilege." D'Arcy was replaced by Naomi Battrick due to scheduling issues.

=== Controversy ===
In February 2023, the family of Anna Politkovskaya released a joint statement expressing concern about the factual accuracy of the script they had been given at the start of production, that they had not contributed in any way, nor had they granted permission for their names to be used in the film.

== Release ==
In May 2024, it was reported that sales agent Concourse Media presented the film to buyers in Cannes under the title of Words of War.

Following the Toronto International Film Festival market in September 2024, it was announced that domestic distribution rights for the Words of War film were acquired by Decal Releasing and a theatrical release scheduled for 2025.

Variety reported that Words of War was released in U.S. theaters starting on May 2, 2025. The film was released in UK and Ireland cinemas on June 27, 2025.

== Reception ==
On the review aggregator website Rotten Tomatoes, 75% of 24 critics' reviews are positive, with an average rating of 6.7/10. Metacritic, which uses a weighted average, assigned the film a score of 63 out of 100, based on 7 critics, indicating "generally favorable" reviews.
