= 15,000 Kids and Counting =

- Genre: Documentary
- Country of origin: United Kingdom
- Original language: English
- No. of seasons: 1
- No. of episodes: 3

Original release
- Network: Channel 4
- Release: 3 April – 17 April 2014

15,000 Kids and Counting is a three-part British documentary on Channel 4, first shown in April 2014. It deals with children put up for adoption in the UK. The title is a reference to the American show 19 Kids and Counting.
