= Toby Jones =

English actor (born 1966)

Toby Jones OBE
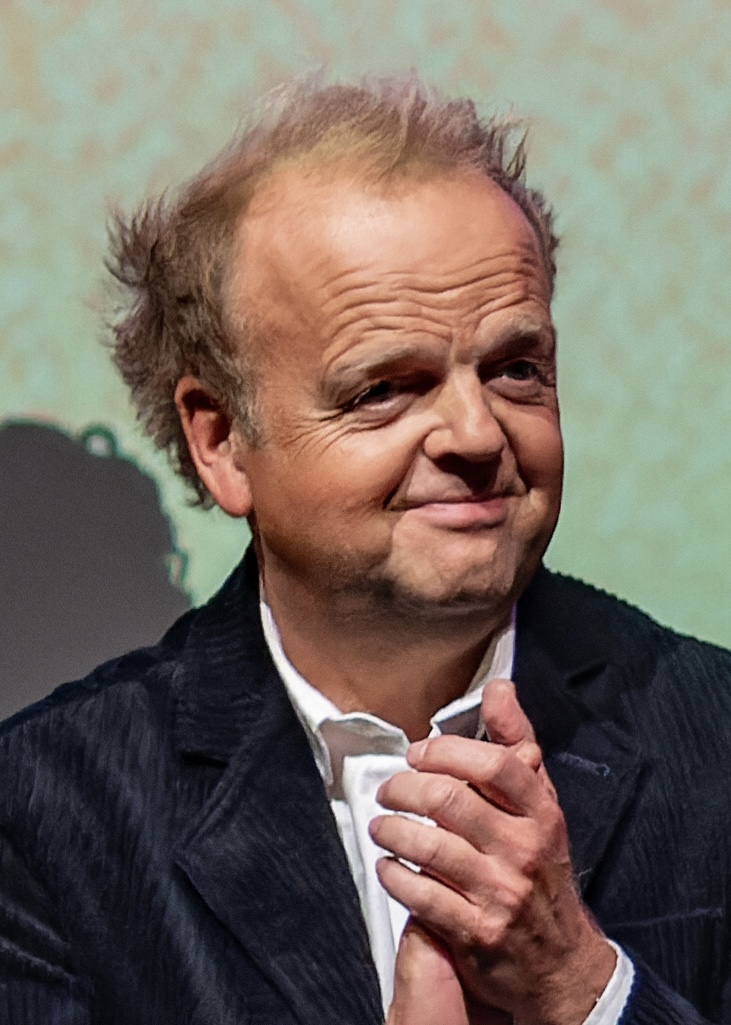
- Jones in 2022
- Born: Toby Edward Heslewood Jones; 7 September 1966 (age 60); Hammersmith, London, England
- Education: Abingdon School; University of Manchester (1986–1989); L'École Internationale de Théâtre Jacques Lecoq (1989–1991)
- Occupation: Actor
- Years active: 1992–present
- Spouse: Karen Jones (m. 2015)
- Children: 2
- Father: Freddie Jones

Toby Edward Heslewood Jones (born 7 September 1966) is an English actor. He is known for his extensive character actor roles on stage and screen. From 1989 to 1991, Jones trained at L'École Internationale de Théâtre Jacques Lecoq. He earned a Laurence Olivier Award for Best Actor in a Supporting Role in 2001 for his performance in the comedy play The Play What I Wrote, which played in the West End and on Broadway. In 2020, he was nominated for his second Olivier Award, for Best Actor for his performance in a revival of Anton Chekov's Uncle Vanya.

Jones made his film debut in Sally Potter's period drama Orlando in 1992. He continued to appear in minor roles in films such as Naked (1993), Ever After (1998), Finding Neverland (2005), and Mrs Henderson Presents (2005), before garnering positive notices for his lead role of Truman Capote in the biopic Infamous (2006). He has since acted in The Painted Veil (2006), The Mist (2007), W. (2008), Frost/Nixon (2008), Tinker Tailor Soldier Spy (2011), The Adventures of Tintin (2011), Berberian Sound Studio (2012), Happy End (2017), First Cow (2019), and Mr Burton (2025). Jones is also known for his voice role as Dobby in the Harry Potter films (2002, 2010) and for playing Arnim Zola in the Marvel films Captain America: The First Avenger (2011) and Captain America: The Winter Soldier (2014). Further blockbuster film credits include The Hunger Games franchise (2012–2013), Jurassic World: Fallen Kingdom (2018), and Indiana Jones and the Dial of Destiny (2023).

He was nominated for a Golden Globe Award for Best Actor – Miniseries or Television Film, a Primetime Emmy Award for Lead Actor in a Miniseries or Movie, and a British Academy Television Award for Best Actor for his role as Alfred Hitchcock in the HBO television film The Girl (2012). He was also nominated for a BAFTA for his role in the BBC Two television film Marvellous (2014) and won a Best Male Comedy Performance BAFTA for his role in Detectorists (2014–2017, 2022). Jones starred as Alan Bates in the acclaimed series Mr Bates vs The Post Office (2024), which won a Peabody Award and another nomination for the British Academy Television Award for Best Actor.

== Early life ==
Jones was born in Hammersmith, London to actors Jennifer Jones (née Heslewood) and Freddie Jones, and grew up in Oxford. He has two brothers. He attended Christ Church Cathedral School and Abingdon School in Oxfordshire in the 1980s. He studied drama at the University of Manchester from 1986 to 1989, and at L'École Internationale de Théâtre Jacques Lecoq in Paris from 1989 to 1991.

In July 2026 Jones was the subject of BBC's Who Do You Think You Are?. The programme revealed that, in his maternal ancestral line, five generations of women had been actresses; his great-great-great grandmother, Sarah Thorne, was the manager of the Theatre Royal in Margate. On his father's side, his great-grandfather, Henry Enoch Jones, was a "potter's saggar maker" in Stoke-on-Trent. Henry's father John, a British Army soldier, was involved in the Indian Rebellion of 1857 and had married Jane, an Indo-British subject, in Meerut. A DNA test revealed that Jones had 1% Indian DNA.

== Career ==
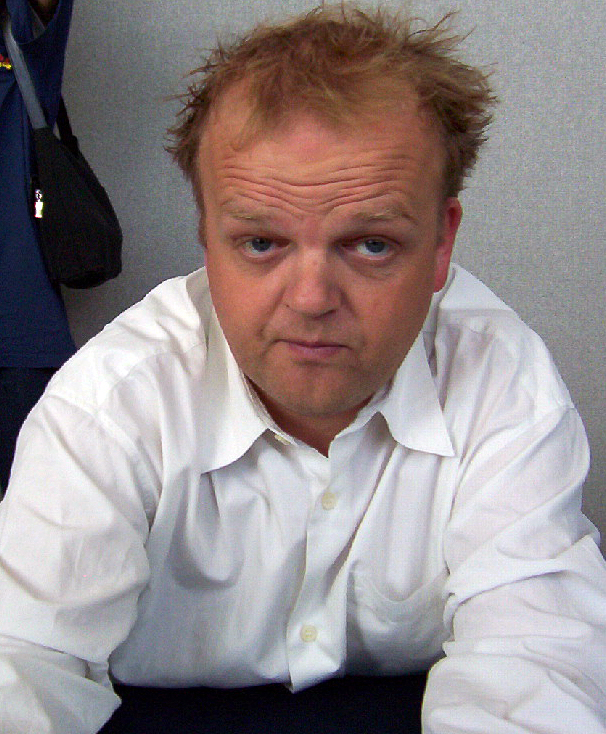
Jones in 2003

=== Film and television ===
Jones has appeared in more than 60 films since his first acting role in the 1992 film Orlando. He voiced Dobby in two Harry Potter films: Chamber of Secrets (2002), and The Deathly Hallows – Part 1 (2010). He played Robert Cecil, 1st Earl of Salisbury in the HBO/Channel 4 production Elizabeth I. In 2006, he portrayed Truman Capote in the biopic Infamous. He appeared in the film adaptation of Stephen King's The Mist in 2007. In 2008, he portrayed Karl Rove in Oliver Stone's W, and Hollywood agent Swifty Lazar in Frost/Nixon. He appeared alongside his father in the 2004 film Ladies in Lavender.

Jones appeared in the 2010 episode "Amy's Choice", of Doctor Who, as the Dream Lord, and in the Big Finish Productions series' Dark Eyes (audio drama) as Kotris. He also played the role of Samuel Ratchett in Agatha Christie's Poirot TV Series 12 episode "Murder on the Orient Express". In 2011, he played the role of the British spy master Percy Alleline in the adaptation of John Le Carré's Tinker Tailor Soldier Spy, and Arnim Zola in Captain America: The First Avenger, a role which he reprised in the sequel Captain America: The Winter Soldier, three years later, as well as in a cameo in the TV series Agent Carter the following year. In 2012, he had a leading role in the ITV mini-series Titanic, starred as one of the seven dwarves in Snow White and the Huntsman, played Dr. Paul Shackleton in Red Lights, and Max in Virginia. He also portrayed film director Alfred Hitchcock in the HBO television film The Girl, a role that earned him his first Golden Globe Award nomination, as well as his first Primetime Emmy Award nomination.

In 1998, he appeared as a City businessman in the music video for Gomez's song "Whippin' Piccadilly", from their album Bring It On.

He played Neil Baldwin in the BBC drama Marvellous in 2014. Sam Wollaston, in The Guardian, praised Jones's "lovely, very human, performance", one that earned him his second British Academy Television Award nomination. From 2014, he appeared in the BBC Four television series Detectorists, for which he received a nomination for the British Academy Television Award for Best Male Comedy Performance in 2016, before winning the award in 2018.

In 2015, Jones played the part of Roger Yount, a banker, in the three-part BBC series Capital based on John Lanchester's novel of the same name. Discussing working with Jones on Capital, writer Peter Bowker said, "I think Toby is a genius and thought that long before I worked with him. He always wants to know a character's needs, and what's beneath those needs. Then he takes all that material and somehow embeds it into the character and physically inhabits the character, so that you never think he's playing the character. It's fascinating to watch him close up. He carries the emotional complexities in every tiny gesture that his character makes so that you immediately can see what his character is like. A character like Roger is full of contradictions, a city banker with an air of entitlement but also a little insecurity picking away at him. Toby can portray that in his walk alone. That's what's great about him, he can portray cold he can portray warm and he can portray both of those things at once."

He played Captain Mainwaring in the film Dad's Army, released in February 2016. In July, of the same year he starred as the eponymous agent Verloc in the BBC's The Secret Agent, a three-part television adaptation of Joseph Conrad's 1907 novel.

In 2017, he portrayed Culverton Smith in "The Lying Detective", an episode of the BBC crime drama Sherlock. In 2018, he played the dinosaur auctioneer Mr. Eversoll in Jurassic World: Fallen Kingdom, the fifth instalment of the Jurassic Park series. In the same year, Jones voiced Owl in Disney's live-action Christopher Robin.

Jones co-wrote with Tim Crouch the comedy series Don't Forget the Driver, released on BBC 2 in 2019, and in which he appeared as Peter Green; it was Jones's first time writing for television.

In 2024, Jones played Alan Bates in the ITV drama Mr Bates vs The Post Office, a dramatisation of the British Post Office scandal.

He appears as newspaper editor Alan Rusbridger in ITV television drama series about the News International phone hacking scandal, The Hack. In 2025 he also appeared as Philip Burton in a film about the early life of Richard Burton in Mr Burton.

=== Radio and audiobooks ===
In 2003 Jones played the part of Lord Brideshead in a BBC Radio adaptation of Brideshead Revisited. Jones voiced the title character in the 2005 BBC Radio 4 adaptation of Oblomov. He also read the 2009 Radio 4 adaptation of John Irving's A Prayer for Owen Meany. He played Inspector Goole in the 2010 BBC Radio adaptation of An Inspector Calls. Since 2013 Jones has been the voice of the lead character, Joey Oldman in the BBC Radio 4 series The Corrupted, an adaptation of the G. F. Newman novel Crime and Punishment. On 2 December 2012 he played Napoleon Bonaparte in Anthony Burgess's Napoleon Rising on Radio 3. In 2013 he played Kotris in the award-winning Doctor Who audio play, Dark Eyes, and read an abridged version of "The Manual of Detection" by Jedediah Berry for the BBC. In 2020 he portrayed Falstaff in BBC Radio 3's Henry IV, Part 1.

In 2021, Jones recorded the audiobook versions of John le Carré's final novel Silverview for Penguin Audio and, for Harper Audio, the seminal dystopian novel We by Yevgeny Zamyatin in a translation by Bela Shayevich.

=== Stage ===
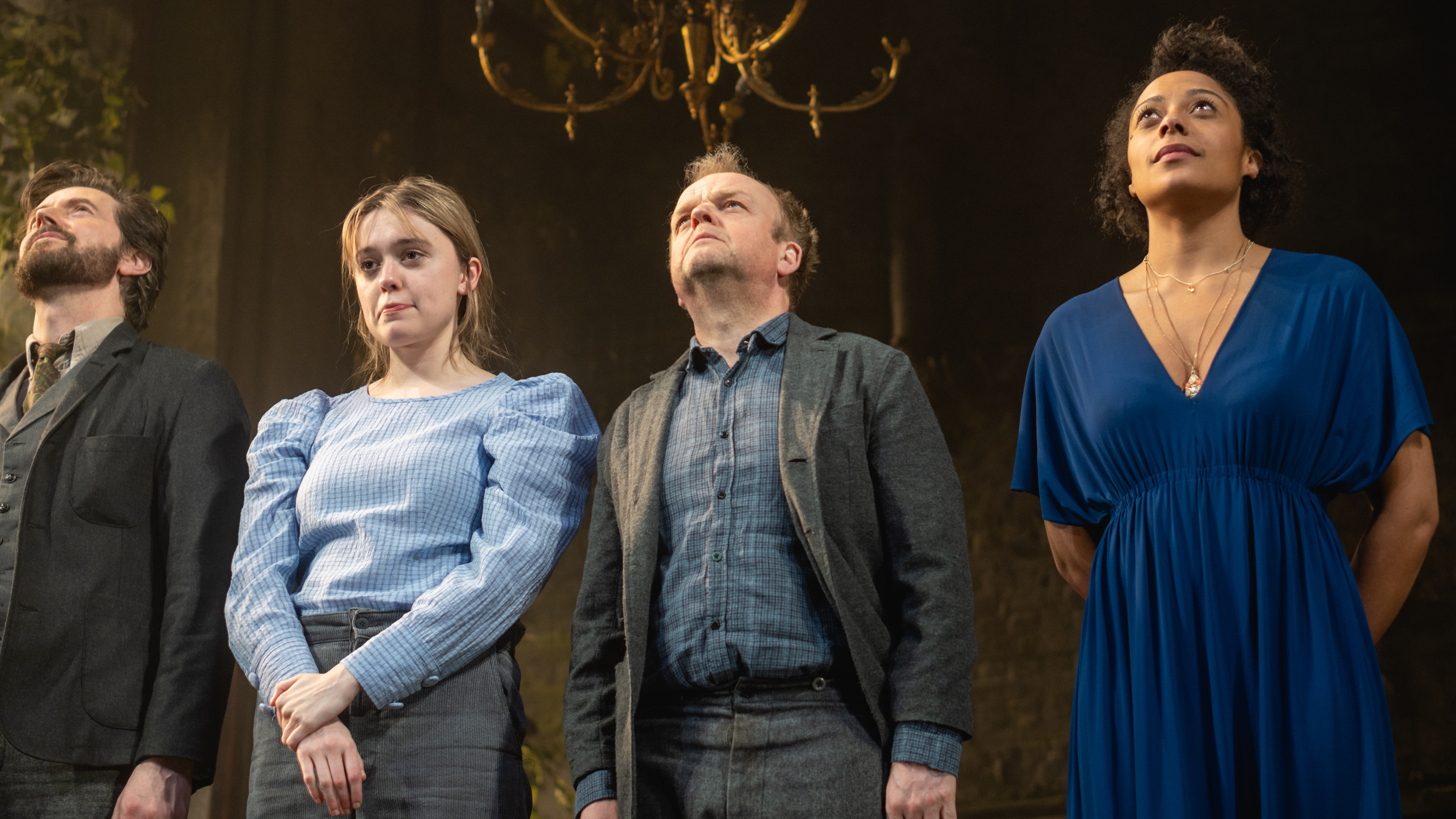
Jones (centre) in Uncle Vanya in 2020

In 2001, he starred in the London West End comedy The Play What I Wrote, directed by Kenneth Branagh, and his comic turn as Arthur earned him the Laurence Olivier Award for Best Actor in a Supporting Role.

In 2009, he returned to the stage in Every Good Boy Deserves Favour at the National Theatre, Parlour Song at the Almeida Theatre, and The First Domino at Brighton Festival Fringe.

In 2011, he played J. M. W. Turner in The Painter at the Arcola Theatre. Jones starred as Stanley in the 2018 revival of The Birthday Party at The Harold Pinter Theatre.

In 2020, he starred in the title role in the Conor McPherson adaptation of Uncle Vanya by Anton Chekhov, at the Harold Pinter Theatre, his role securing the Laurence Olivier Award for Best Actor in 2020.

== Personal life ==
On The Graham Norton Show, Jones said that he and his wife Karen were together for 26 years before they married in 2015. They have two daughters.

Jones has close connections with Stoke-on-Trent through his father Freddie. He supports Stoke City, owing to his father's love for the club. In 2019, he became patron of the Stoke-based theatre company Claybody Theatre.

== Filmography ==
Key
†	Denotes works that have not yet been released

=== Film ===
Year	Title	Role	Notes
1992	Orlando	Second valet	
1993	Naked	Man at tea bar	
1993	Dropping the Baby	Babyman	Short film
1994	Triphony	Man at Fire	
1998	Les Misérables	Door keeper	
1998	Cousin Bette	Gentleman in Café des Artistes	
1998	Ever After	Royal page	
1999	Simon Magus	Buchholz	
1999	The Messenger: The Story of Joan of Arc	English judge	
2000	The Nine Lives of Tomas Katz	Civil servant	
2000	Hotel Splendide	Kitchen boy	
2002	Harry Potter and the Chamber of Secrets	Dobby (voice)	
2004	Ladies in Lavender	Hedley	
2004	Finding Neverland	Smee	
2005	Mrs Henderson Presents	Gordon	
2006	Scoop	Joe's Co-passenger	Uncredited role
2006	Infamous	Truman Capote	
2006	Amazing Grace	Duke of Clarence	
2006	The Sickie	Douglas Knott	
2006	The Painted Veil	Waddington	
2007	The Mist	Ollie Weeks	
2007	Nightwatching	Gerard Dou	
2007	St Trinian's	Bursar	
2008	City of Ember	Barton Snode	
2008	Frost/Nixon	Swifty Lazar	
2008	W.	Karl Rove	
2009	Creation	Thomas Huxley	
2009	St Trinian's 2: The Legend of Fritton's Gold	Bursar	
2010	Sex & Drugs & Rock & Roll	Hargreaves	
2010	Virginia	Max	
2010	Harry Potter and the Deathly Hallows – Part 1	Dobby (voice)	
2011	The Rite	Father Matthew	
2011	Your Highness	Julie	
2011	Captain America: The First Avenger	Dr. Arnim Zola	
2011	Tinker Tailor Soldier Spy	Percy Alleline	
2011	My Week with Marilyn	Arthur P. Jacobs	
2011	The Adventures of Tintin: The Secret of the Unicorn	Aristides Silk (voice)	Motion capture
2012	Red Lights	Paul Shackleton	
2012	The Hunger Games	Claudius Templesmith	
2012	Snow White and the Huntsman	Coll	
2012	Berberian Sound Studio	Gilderoy	BIFA Best Actor
2012	Sea Change	(unknown)	Short film
2013	Words of Everest	Jan Morris	Documentary film
2013	Leave to Remain	Mr. Nigel	
2013	The Hunger Games: Catching Fire	Claudius Templesmith	
2013	The Flea	The Flea	
2013	Hardwire	Max	Short film
2014	Muppets Most Wanted	Museo del Prado Guard No. 2	Cameo
2014	Captain America: The Winter Soldier	Dr. Arnim Zola	
2014	The Cask of Amontillado	Montresor	Short film
2014	The Dark	Dad	Short film
2014	By the Gun	Jerry	
2014	Serena	Sheriff McDowell	
2015	Tale of Tales	King of Highhills	
2015	By Our Selves	John Clare	
2015	The Man Who Knew Infinity	John Edensor Littlewood	
2015	The Hunger Games: Mockingjay – Part 2	Claudius Templesmith	Uncredited role
2016	Dad's Army	Captain Mainwaring	
2016	Anthropoid	Jan Zelenka-Hajský	
2016	Morgan	Dr. Simon Ziegler	
2016	Kaleidoscope	Carl	
2017	Atomic Blonde	Eric Gray	
2017	Happy End	Lawrence Bradshaw	
2017	The Entertainer	Paul Limp	Short film
2017	Journey's End	Private Mason	
2017	The Snowman	DC Svensson	
2017	Zoo	Security Guard Charlie	
2018	Naked Normandy	Newman	
2018	Jurassic World: Fallen Kingdom	Mr. Eversoll	
2018	Christopher Robin	Owl (voice)	
2018	Out of Blue	Professor Ian Strammi	
2019	First Cow	Chief Factor	
2019	The Sands of Venus	Gerard	Short film
2020	The Last Thing He Wanted	Paul Schuster	
2020	Archive	Vincent Sinclair	
2021	Infinite	Bryan Porter	
2021	The Electrical Life of Louis Wain	Sir William Ingram	
2021	A Few Miles South	Ted	Short film
2021	A Boy Called Christmas	Father Topo	
2022	A Moral Man	Philip	Short film
2022	The Wonder	Dr. McBrearty	
2022	Empire of Light	Norman	
2022	The Pale Blue Eye	Dr. Daniel Marquis	
2023	Tetris	Robert Stein	
2023	Indiana Jones and the Dial of Destiny	Basil Shaw	
2023	Mercy Road	The Associate	
2023	Wander to Wonder	Fumbleton (voice)	Short film
2023	The Canterville Ghost	The Reverend Chasuble (voice)	
2024	The Instigators	Attorney Alan Flynn	
2024	Schneewittchen	The Prince	
2025	The Actor	Lieutenant Murray / Artie Bellman / Cabbie / Arnold	
2025	Mr Burton	P. H. Burton	Also executive producer
2026	Flavia	Inspector Hewitt	
TBA	A Matter of Time	TBA	Post-production

=== Television ===
==== Acting ====
Year	Title	Role	Notes
1993	Lovejoy	Sgt. Protheroe	Episode: "Pig in a Poke"
1994	Cadfael	Griffin	Episode: "The Sanctuary Sparrow"
1995	Performance	Wart	Episode: "Henry IV"
1996	Death of a Salesman	Waiter	Television film. Uncredited role
1998	Numbertime	Tim	10 episodes; also co-writer
1998	Out of Hours	Martin Styles	6 episodes
1999	Underground	Beast	Television film
1999	Aristocrats	Ste Fox	4 episodes
1999–2000	Midsomer Murders	Dan Peterson	4 episodes
2001	In Love and War	Bolo	Television film
2001	Victoria & Albert	Edward Oxford	Episode 2
2001	The Way We Live Now	Squercum	Episode 4
2001	Love or Money	Phil	Television film
2002	15 Storeys High	Mr. Roberts	Episode: "Ice Queen"
2005	Coming Up	Simon	Episode: "Loving Ludmilla"
2005	Elizabeth I	Robert Cecil	2 episodes
2006	A Harlot's Progress	William Hogarth	Television film
2007	The Last Detective	Bennett	Episode: "A Funny Thing Happened on the Way to Willesden"
2007	The Old Curiosity Shop	Daniel Quilp	Television film
2008	10 Days to War	Francis Brooke	Episode: "$100 Coffee"
2010	Mo	Dr. Mark Glaser	Television film
2010	Doctor Who	The Dream Lord	Episode: "Amy's Choice"
2010	Agatha Christie's Poirot	Samuel Ratchett / Lanfranco Cassetti	Episode: "Murder on the Orient Express"
2010	God in America	George Whitefield	Episode: "A New Adam / A New Eden"
2011	Christopher and His Kind	Gerald Hamilton	Television film
2012	Titanic	John Batley	4 episodes
2012	The Girl	Alfred Hitchcock	Television film
2014	Marvellous	Neil Baldwin	Television film
2014–2017, 2022	Detectorists	Lance Stater	20 episodes
2015	Agent Carter	Dr. Arnim Zola	Episode: "Valediction"
2015	Capital	Roger Yount	3 episodes
2015–2016	Wayward Pines	Dr. Jenkins / David Pilcher	15 episodes
2016	The Secret Agent	Anton Verloc	3 episodes
2016	The Witness for the Prosecution	John Mayhew	2 episodes
2016	Civil	Otis O'Dell	Unaired pilot
2017	Sherlock	Culverton Smith	Episode: "The Lying Detective"
2019	Don't Forget the Driver	Pete Green / Barry Green	6 episodes; also co-creator and writer
2019	The Dark Crystal: Age of Resistance	The Librarian (voice)	6 episodes
2021	Danny Boy	Phil Shiner	Television film
2021	What If...?	Arnim Zola (voice)	3 episodes
2021	Worzel Gummidge	The Village Committee	Episode: "Guy Forks"
2022	Harry Potter 20th Anniversary: Return to Hogwarts	Himself	HBO Max special
2022	The English	Sebold Cusk	Episode: "What You Want & What You Need"
2023	The Long Shadow	DCS Dennis Hoban	5 episodes
2024	Mr Bates vs The Post Office	Alan Bates	4 episodes
2025	A Cruel Love: The Ruth Ellis Story	John Bickford	4 episodes
2025	The Hack	Alan Rusbridger	5 episodes
2025–present	MobLand	Colin Tattersall	Main cast; 7 episodes
2026	Hijack	Peter Faber	7 episodes
2026	Good Omens	Satan	Episode: "The Finale"

==== Non-acting ====
Year	Title	Role	Notes
2026	Who Do You Think You Are?	Himself	1 episode

==== Narration ====
In addition to his acting work, Jones has provided voice-overs for numerous TV documentaries, including:

- Arnold Schwarzenegger: Made in Britain – (2003)
- The Man Inside Dame Edna – (UK version, 2008)
- Murder on the Victorian Railway – (2013)
- Natural World – 1 episode: "Honey Badgers: Masters of Mayhem" (2014)
- The Last Days Of... – 2 episodes: "Mary, Queen of Scots" and "Guy Fawkes" (2015)
- The Secret Life of 4, 5 and 6 Year Olds – 3 series (2015–2017)
- Normal for Norfolk – Series 1–2; 10 episodes (2016–2017)
- Second Chance Summer: Tuscany – 6 episodes (2017)
- Horizon – 1 episode: "Jupiter Revealed" (2018)
- Inside Alton Towers – (2018)
- The Lost Commando Raid – (2018)
- A Wild Year – 3 episodes (2020)
- Wild Tokyo – (2020)
- Morecambe & Wise: The Lost Tapes – (2021)
- Mr Bates vs the Post Office: The Real Story – (2024)
- Dad's Army at the BBC – (2025)
- Hidden Treasures of the National Trust – Series 3–4; 9 episodes (2025–2026)

=== Theatre ===
Year	Title	Role	Venue
1993	The Servant of Two Masters	Truffaldino Battochio	West Yorkshire Playhouse, Leeds
1994–1995	Out of a House Walked a Man	Performer	Royal National Theatre, London
1995	King Lear	Fool	West Yorkshire Playhouse, Leeds
1995	King Lear	Fool	Hackney Empire, London
1996	The Government Inspector	Khlestakov	West Yorkshire Playhouse, Leeds
1996–1997	A Midsummer Night's Dream	Flute	Almeida Theatre, London
1999–2001	The Wanted Man	John Jump (also writer)	International tour
1999	The Reprieve	Performer (also writer)	Battersea Arts Centre, London
1999–2000	The Nativity	Joseph	Young Vic, London
2000	Coventry	Performer (also writer)	Royal National Theatre, London
2001	The Wall	The Man	Royal National Theatre, London
2001	Missing Reel	Performer (also writer)	Traverse Theatre, Edinburgh
2001	The Play What I Wrote	Arthur	Liverpool Playhouse
2001–2002	The Play What I Wrote	Arthur	Wyndham's Theatre, West End
2003	The Play What I Wrote	Arthur	Lyceum Theatre, Broadway
2004	Measure for Measure	Lucio	Royal National Theatre, London
2009	Every Good Boy Deserves a Favor	Alexander Ivanov	Royal National Theatre, London
2013	Circle Mirror Transformation	Schultz	Rose Lipman Building, London
2014	Parlor Song	Ned	Almeida Theatre, London
2018	The Birthday Party	Stanley Webber	Harold Pinter Theatre, West End
2019	Glass. Kill. Bluebeard. Imp.	Bluebeard's friend (Bluebeard) / Jimmy (Imp)	Royal Court Theatre, London
2020	Uncle Vanya	Uncle Vanya	Harold Pinter Theatre, West End
2025	Othello	Iago	Theatre Royal Haymarket, West End

=== Theme park attractions ===
Year	Title	Role	Venue
2019	Ant-Man and The Wasp: Nano Battle!	Arnim Zola	Hong Kong Disneyland

=== Video games ===
Year	Title	Role	Notes
2010	Harry Potter and the Deathly Hallows – Part 1	Dobby (voice)	

== Awards and nominations ==
=== Film ===
Year	Award	Category	Work	Result	Ref.
2007	London Film Critics' Circle Award	British Actor of the Year	Infamous	Won	
2007	Ibiza International Film Festival Award	Best Actor	Infamous	Won	
2008	London Film Critics' Circle Award	British Supporting Actor of the Year	The Painted Veil	Nominated	
2009	London Film Critics' Circle Award	British Supporting Actor of the Year	Frost/Nixon and W.	Nominated	
2009	Screen Actors Guild Award	Outstanding Cast in a Motion Picture	Frost/Nixon	Nominated	
2012	British Independent Film Awards	BIFA Best Actor	Berberian Sound Studio	Won	
2013	London Film Critics' Circle Award	British Actor of the Year	Berberian Sound Studio	Won	

=== Television ===
Year	Award	Category	Work	Result	Ref
2013	Golden Globe Award	Best Actor – Miniseries or TV Movie	The Girl	Nominated	
2013	Primetime Emmy Award	Lead Actor in a Miniseries or Movie	The Girl	Nominated	
2013	British Academy Television Award	BAFTA Leading Actor	The Girl	Nominated	
2015	British Academy Television Award	BAFTA Leading Actor	Marvellous	Nominated	
2016	British Academy Television Award	Best Male Performance in a Comedy Programme	Detectorists	Nominated	
2018	British Academy Television Award	Best Male Performance in a Comedy Programme	Detectorists	Won	
2024	National Television Awards	Drama Performance	Mr Bates vs The Post Office	Won	

=== Theatre ===
Year	Award	Category	Nominated work	Result	Ref
2002	Laurence Olivier Award	Best Actor in a Supporting Role	The Play What I Wrote	Won	
2020	Laurence Olivier Award	Best Actor	Uncle Vanya	Nominated	

==== Honours ====
Jones was awarded honorary doctorates by Oxford Brookes University in 2018 and Keele University in 2025. He was appointed Officer of the Order of the British Empire (OBE) in the 2021 New Year Honours, for services to drama.

== See also ==
- List of Old Abingdonians
