= Mr Burton =

British biopic film on Richard Burton and Phillip Burton

- Theatrical release poster
- Directed by: Marc Evans
- Written by: Tom Bullough; Josh Hyams
- Produced by: Ed Talfan; Hannah Thomas; Josh Hyams; Trevor Matthews
- Starring: Harry Lawtey; Toby Jones; Lesley Manville; Steffan Rhodri; Aimee-Ffion Edwards; Aneurin Barnard; Daniel Evans
- Cinematography: Stuart Biddlecombe
- Edited by: Tim Hodges
- Music by: John Hardy
- Production companies: Severn Screen; Brookstreet Pictures; Promise Pictures
- Distributed by: Icon Film Distribution
- Release date: 4 April 2025
- Running time: 124 minutes
- Country: United Kingdom
- Languages: English, Welsh

Mr Burton is a 2025 British biographical drama film about the early life of Welsh actor Richard Burton and his relationship with his mentor Philip Burton. It is directed by Marc Evans, written by Tom Bullough and Josh Hyams, and stars Harry Lawtey as Richard, alongside Toby Jones (as Philip Burton), and Lesley Manville. It was released in British cinemas on 4 April 2025.

== Cast ==
- Harry Lawtey as Richard Burton
- Toby Jones as Philip Burton
- Lesley Manville as Ma Smith
- Aimee-Ffion Edwards as Cis
- Steffan Rhodri as Dic Jenkins
- Aneurin Barnard as Elfed
- Mali O'Donnell as Phyllis
- Matthew Gravelle as Sir Cyril Cooke
- Hannah New as Daphne Rye
- Daniel Evans as Anthony Quayle

== Production ==
The project was announced in February 2024 with Marc Evans directing from a script written by Tom Bullough and Josh Hyams. Ed Talfan and Hannah Thomas are producers for Severn Screen, with Trevor Matthews producing for Brookstreet Pictures and Josh Hyams producing for Promise Pictures. The film also has finance from BBC Wales and Ffilm Cymru Wales, in partnership with Creative Wales.

In May 2024, Harry Lawtey was cast as a young Richard Jenkins. Toby Jones was cast as Mr Burton, the school teacher who had a profound effect on the life of his pupil and became Jenkins' legal guardian, resulting in Jenkins changing his name to Richard Burton. Lesley Manville was cast as Mr Burton's landlady, with Aimee-Ffion Edwards and Aneurin Barnard as young Jenkins' sister and brother-in-law.

Principal photography began in July 2024 for a 2025 release to mark the centenary of Richard Burton's birth. Filming was completed in August 2024.

Composer John Hardy is the nephew of Robert Hardy, lifelong friend of Richard Burton. The score was recorded by the BBC National Orchestra of Wales at the Wales Millennium Centre in December 2024.

== Reception ==
On the review aggregator website Rotten Tomatoes, 93% of 42 critics' reviews are positive, with an average rating of 6.8/10. The website's consensus reads: "A thoroughly evocative exploration of artistry and mentorship, Mr. Burton is vividly brought to life by the absorbing dynamic between stars Toby Jones and Harry Lawtey." Metacritic, which uses a weighted average, assigned the film a score of 61 out of 100, based on 9 critics, indicating "generally favorable" reviews. Peter Bradshaw of The Guardian gave the film three out of five stars.

=== Accolades ===
The film received four nominations at the 2025 BAFTA Cymru Awards, including nominations in the Best Actor category for Lawtey, and in the Sound, Editing, and Photography categories. Subsequently, the award for Best Photography and Lighting - fiction; was won by Stuart Biddlecombe for the film. It was nominated for Outstanding British Film at the 79th British Academy Film Awards.

== See also ==
- Burton & Taylor (2013 BBC Four film)
