= Gender & History =

- Language: English

Publication details
- History: 1989–present
- Publisher: Wiley-Blackwell
- Frequency: Triannually

Standard abbreviations
- ISO 4: Gend. Hist.

Indexing
- CODEN: GEHIEN
- ISSN: 0953-5233 (print); 1468-0424 (web)
- LCCN: 90649969
- OCLC no.: 905764287

Links
- Journal homepage; Online archive

Gender & History is an international academic journal. It is an important academic journal for articles relating to the history of femininity, masculinity, and gender relations. The current editors are Rosemary Elliot, Maud Bracke, James Simpson, and Stuart Airlie in Glasgow, Scotland, and Cheryl Krasnick Warsh, Cathryn Spence, and Katharine Rollwagen in Nanaimo, British Columbia, Canada.

== History ==
The journal was founded in the late 1980s by people who included the Welsh professor of history Angela V. John.

The journal was edited by Karen Adler and Ross Balzaretti between 2004 and 2010. It was edited by Lynn Abrams, Alexandra Shepard, and Eleanor Gordon from 2010 to 2016. It was edited by Sarah Chambers, Mary Jo Maynes and Tracey Deutsch from 2008 to 2018.
