= Normal for Norfolk (TV series) =

- Country of origin: United Kingdom
- Original language: English

Production
- Running time: 30 minutes

Original release
- Network: BBC

Normal for Norfolk is a BBC documentary-style reality television programme, created for BBC 2 and following the daily life of eccentric aristocrat farmer Desmond MacCarthy, his family, and his home of Wiveton Hall. Series one aired in 2016, and series two began airing in July 2017.
