= Westlands, Staffordshire =

Coordinates: 52.9971°N 2.2347°W

Westlands
- Location within Staffordshire
- Population: 5,749
- OS grid reference: SJ843444
- District: Newcastle-under-Lyme
- Shire county: Staffordshire
- Region: West Midlands
- Country: England
- Sovereign state: United Kingdom
- Post town: Newcastle
- Postcode district: ST5
- Dialling code: 01782
- Police: Staffordshire
- Fire: Staffordshire
- Ambulance: West Midlands
- UK Parliament: Newcastle-under-Lyme

Westlands, more commonly known as "The Westlands", is a suburban area and ward in Newcastle-under-Lyme, Staffordshire.

The boundaries of The Westlands were defined in the early 1940s

The design was based on 'model village' developments in the 1890s from George Cadbury. Cadbury was responsible for the Birmingham based Bournville, built around his factory.

The designs in Bournville became a blueprint for many model villages in Britain as they recognised the benefits of open space within town planning.

Newcastle Borough Council hired S.A. Wilmot who was an architect for Bournville Garden City to come up with plans that formed the basis for The Westlands.

This map shows the plans for the estate and existing boundaries for what is considered 'The Westlands'. The documents related to the area can be found at The Brampton Museum in Newcastle under Lyme.

== Religion ==
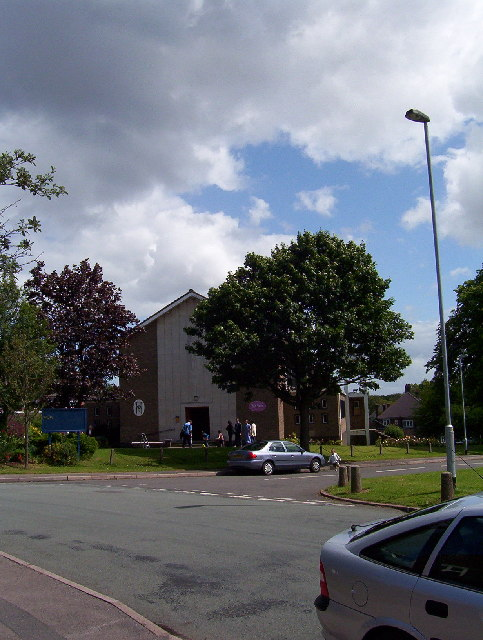
St. Atunder Lyme Borough drew's Church in the Westlands

There are two places of worship; St Andrew's Church (Anglican) and Masjid At-Taqwa Islamic Centre (Islamic).

The building that is now the Islamic Centre was previously St Peter's Church, a Methodist church. St Andrew's and St Peter's together formed a local ecumenical partnership called The Church in the Westlands. However, St Peter's Church closed in 2021. Community groups were formed in an attempt to prevent the unoccupied building from being sold to property developers. In November 2022 it was eventually sold to a charity with a plan to convert the building into a Mosque and Islamic Centre. Masjid At-Taqwa Islamic Centre, the first Mosque in the area, opened to the public in September 2023.
