= Unreported World =

British foreign affairs television programme

- Presented by: Guest presenter
- Country of origin: United Kingdom
- Original language: English
- No. of series: 50
- No. of episodes: 347

Production
- Running time: 24 minutes

Original release
- Network: Channel 4
- Release: 8 September 2000 – present

Unreported World is a British foreign affairs programme made by ITN Productions and broadcast by Channel 4 in the United Kingdom, first broadcast on 8 September 2000. Over the course of the programme, reporters have travelled to dangerous locations all over the world in an attempt to uncover stories usually ignored by global media outlets. It is a critically acclaimed series on the lives of people in some of the fastest-changing areas of the world.

== Series overview ==
Series	Episodes	Originally released	
Series	Episodes	First released	Last released
1	4	8 September 2000	29 September 2000
2	7	28 September 2001	16 November 2001
3	5	11 January 2002	27 July 2002
4	3	25 November 2002	20 December 2002
5	3	21 February 2003	14 March 2003
6	5	7 November 2003	5 December 2003
7	4	8 April 2004	24 April 2004
8	4	9 October 2004	30 October 2004
9	5	11 June 2005	16 July 2005
10	5	19 November 2005	17 December 2005
11	10	21 April 2006	30 June 2006
12	10	13 October 2006	15 December 2006
13	10	13 April 2007	30 June 2007
14	10	14 September 2007	16 November 2007
15	10	8 February 2008	18 April 2008
16	10	17 October 2008	2 January 2009
17	10	13 March 2009	15 May 2009
18	10	25 September 2009	27 November 2009
19	10	26 March 2010	21 July 2010
20	10	1 October 2010	10 December 2010
21	10	25 March 2011	10 June 2011
22	10	7 October 2011	9 December 2011
23	8	13 April 2012	8 June 2012
24	8	2 November 2012	21 December 2012
25	8	12 April 2013	31 May 2013
26	8	4 October 2013	22 November 2013
27	8	11 April 2014	30 April 2014
28	8	26 September 2014	21 November 2014
29	8	27 March 2015	15 May 2015
30	8	9 October 2015	27 November 2015
31	8	18 March 2016	6 May 2016
32	8	30 September 2016	25 November 2016
33	8	17 March 2017	5 May 2017
34	8	29 September 2017	17 November 2017
35	6	20 April 2018	25 May 2018
36	6	2 November 2018	7 December 2018
37	6	20 April 2019	24 May 2019
38	4	8 November 2019	6 December 2019
39	5	7 August 2020	4 September 2020
40	6	14 May 2021	25 June 2021
41	6	1 October 2021	26 November 2021
42	6	27 March 2022	25 May 2022
43	6	30 October 2022	11 December 2022
44	5	14 April 2023	19 May 2023
45	5	20 October 2023	1 December 2023
46	5	29 March 2024	24 May 2024
47	5	15 November 2024	13 December 2024
48	5	14 March 2025	18 April 2025
49	5	24 October 2025	21 November 2025
50	5	10 April 2026	15 May 2026

== Episodes ==
=== Series 1 (2000) ===
Series Producer: Eamonn Matthews

No. overall	No. in series	Title	Directed and filmed by	Original release date
1	1	"Azerbaijan: All the President's Oil"	Chris Kendall	8 September 2000
Marcel Theroux hosts.
2	2	"Brazil: Fighting for a Seat at the Table"	Simon Cox	15 September 2000
Sonya Saul hosts.
3	3	"Sudan: Market of Death"	Alexander Dunlop	22 September 2000
Saira Shah hosts.
4	4	"Indonesia: A 21st Century War"	Shane Teehan	29 September 2000
Jonathan Miller hosts.

=== Series 2 (2001) ===
Series Producer: Eamonn Matthews

No. overall	No. in series	Title	Directed and filmed by	Original release date
5	1	"Congo: The Real Mobile Phone War"	TBA	28 September 2001
Juliana Ruhfus hosts.
6	2	"Chechnya: Being Nice to Mr Putin"	Yuri Burak and Nikolai Shishkov	5 October 2001
Marcel Theroux hosts.
7	3	"Bolivia: Coca or Death"	TBA	12 October 2001
Sandra Jordan hosts.
8	4	"Colombia's Oil Fix"	TBA	26 October 2001
Saira Shah hosts.
9	5	"Islam and America through the Eyes of Imran Khan"	TBA	2 November 2001
Imran Khan hosts.
10	6	"China: Handle with Care"	TBA	9 November 2001
Jonathan Miller hosts.
11	7	"Mauritania: Selling the Future"	TBA	16 November 2001
Kim Willsher hosts.

=== Series 3 (2002) ===
Series Producer: Eamonn Matthews

No. overall	No. in series	Title	Directed and filmed by	Original release date
12	1	"Gaza: Journeys To Heaven & Hell"	Rodrigo Vazquez	11 January 2002
Sandra Jordan hosts.
13	2	"Uzbekistan: Our New Best Friend"	Lara Agnew	18 January 2002
Marcel Theroux hosts.
14	3	"Somalia: Last Haven"	Lara Agnew	25 January 2002
Juliana Ruhfus hosts. Article
15	4	"Philippines: The Bearers of the Sword"	Rob Lemkin	8 February 2002
Jonathan Miller hosts.
16	5	"India: Saffron Warriors"	Elizabeth C. Jones	27 July 2002
Burhan Wazir hosts.

=== Series 4 (2002) ===
Series Producer: Eamonn Matthews Note: may be incomplete

No. overall	No. in series	Title	Directed and filmed by	Original release date
17	1	"Nigeria: The Country that Doesn't Work"	Paul Kittel	25 November 2002
Kyle G. Brown hosts.
18	2	"Indonesia's Dirty War"	Chris Kendall	13 December 2002
Jonathan Miller hosts.
19	3	"El Salvador: Killing to Belong"	Rodrigo Vazquez	20 December 2002
Sandra Jordan hosts.

=== Series 5 (2003) ===
Series Producer: Eamonn Matthews Note: may be incomplete

No. overall	No. in series	Title	Directed and filmed by	Original release date
20	1	"Nepal: Raising the Red Flag"	Chris Kendall	21 February 2003
Sandra Jordan hosts.
21	2	"Ivory Coast: Enemies Within"	Callum Macrae	7 March 2003
William Wallis hosts.
22	3	"Haiti: Voodoo Nation"	Rodrigo Vazquez	14 March 2003
Juliana Ruhfus hosts.

=== Series 6 (2003) ===
Series Producer: Eamonn Matthews

No. overall	No. in series	Title	Directed and filmed by	Original release date
23	1	"Mexico: The City of Lost Girls"	Rodrigo Vazquez	7 November 2003
Sandra Jordan hosts.
24	2	"Uganda: The Children's War"	Callum Macrae	14 November 2003
Farai Sevenzo hosts.
25	3	"Thailand: A Quick Fix"	Paul Kittel	21 November 2003
Zaiba Malik hosts.
26	4	"Kenya: Trouble in Paradise"	Chris Kendall	28 November 2003
Juliana Ruhfus hosts.
27	5	"Israel: Clubbing on the Front Line"	Natasha Carlish	5 December 2003
Narrated by Andrew Lincoln.

=== Series 7 (2004) ===
Series Producer: Eamonn Matthews

No. overall	No. in series	Title	Directed and filmed by	Original release date
28	1	"India: The Killing of Kashmir"	Rodrigo Vazquez	8 April 2004
Sandra Jordan hosts.
29	2	"South Africa: SA Law"	Jeremy Jeffs	10 April 2004
Farai Sevenzo hosts.
30	3	"Yemen: Reluctant Friends"	Dollan Cannell	17 April 2004
Juliana Ruhfus hosts.
31	4	"Guyana: Bitter Harvest"	Paul Kittel	24 April 2004
Zaiba Malik hosts.

=== Series 8 (2004) ===
Series Producer: Eamonn Matthews

No. overall	No. in series	Title	Directed and filmed by	Original release date
32	1	"Afghanistan: Occupation Lite"	Nick Hughes	9 October 2004
Sam Kiley hosts.
33	2	"Vietnam: Hearts, Minds and Souls"	Daniel Meyers	16 October 2004
Sandra Jordan hosts.
34	3	"Angola: America's New Frontier"	James Martin Brabazon	23 October 2004
Sam Kiley hosts.
35	4	"Venezuela: El Comandante"	Daniel Meyers	30 October 2004
Sandra Jordan hosts.

=== Series 9 (2005) ===
Series Producer: Flora Gregory

No. overall	No. in series	Title	Directed and filmed by	Original release date
36	1	"India: Land of Missing Children"	Claudio von Planta	11 June 2005
Sam Kiley hosts.
37	2	"Peru and Bolivia: Inca Revolution"	Rodrigo Vazquez	18 June 2005
Sandra Jordan hosts.
38	3	"Papua New Guinea: Rambo Nation"	James Martin Brabazon	25 June 2005
Sam Kiley hosts.
39	4	"Thailand: Ghost Warriors"	Paul Kittel	9 July 2005
Sandra Jordan hosts.
40	5	"Brazil: Slaves of the Amazon"	Jeremy Jeffs	16 July 2005
Sam Kiley hosts.

=== Series 10 (2005) ===
Series Producer: Flora Gregory

No. overall	No. in series	Title	Directed and filmed by	Original release date
41	1	"Iraq: On the Front Line"	James Brabazon	19 November 2005
Peter Oborne hosts.
42	2	"Somalia: Al-Qaeda's New Haven"	James Martin Brabazon	26 November 2005
Aidan Hartley hosts.
43	3	"Gaza: The Bullet and the Ballot Box"	Rodrigo Vazquez	3 December 2005
Sandra Jordan hosts.
44	4	"Pakistan's Double Game"	Claudio von Planta	10 December 2005
Sharmeen Obaid-Chinay hosts.
45	5	"Colombia's Secret War"	Rodrigo Vazquez	17 December 2005
Sandra Jordan hosts.

=== Series 11 (2006) ===
No. overall	No. in series	Title	Directed and filmed by	Original release date
46	1	"Sri Lanka: Tigers in the Shadows"	Esther Oxford	21 April 2006
Sandra Jordan hosts.
47	2	"Kenya: Democracy in the Dumps"	James Martin Brabazon	28 April 2006
Aidan Hartley hosts.
48	3	"Western Sahara: Storm in the Sahara"	Phil Cox	5 May 2006
Khaled Khazziha hosts.
49	4	"Philippines: City of Guilt"	Robin Barnwell	12 May 2006
Sharmeen Obaid-Chinay hosts.
50	5	"Nepal: Kingdom on the Edge"	Dan Edge	19 May 2006
Sandra Jordan hosts.
51	6	"Turkey: Europe's Hidden War"	Tom Porter	26 May 2006
Matthew McAllester hosts.
52	7	"Malaysia: Asia's Slaves"	Claire McFall	2 June 2006
Ramita Navai hosts.
53	8	"Chad and Sudan:"	Robin Barnwell	9 June 2006
Peter Oborne hosts.
54	9	"Democratic Republic of Congo:"	James Martin Brabazon	23 June 2006
Aidan Hartley hosts.
55	10	"Brazil: Slum Warfare"	Tom Porter	30 June 2006
Khaled Khazziha hosts.

=== Series 12 (2006) ===
No. overall	No. in series	Title	Directed and filmed by	Original release date
56	1	"South Africa: The New Apartheid"	Robin Barnwell	13 October 2006
Sharmeen Obaid-Chinoy hosts.
57	2	"West Papua: Rainforest Warriors"	Siobhan Sinnerton	20 October 2006
Evan Williams hosts.
58	3	"India's Hidden War"	James Martin Brabazon	27 October 2006
Sandra Jordan hosts.
59	4	"Guatemala: City of the Dead"	Sam Farmar	3 November 2006
Ramita Navai hosts.
60	5	"Nigeria: Fire in the Delta"	Tim Hetherington	10 November 2006
Matt McAllester hosts.
61	6	"Lebanon on the Brink"	Rodrigo Vazquez	17 November 2006
Kate Seelyle hosts.
62	7	"Mexico: The Longest Journey"	Nick Sturdee	24 November 2006
Sandra Jordan hosts.
63	8	"Afghanistan: Nevermind the Taliban"	Tom Porter	1 December 2006
Kate Clark hosts.
64	9	"Japan: Red Sun Rising"	Edward Watts	8 December 2006
Evan Williams hosts.
65	10	"Somalia: Hearts, Minds and Holy War"	Robin Barnwell	15 December 2006
Aidan Hartley hosts.

=== Series 13 (2007) ===
Series Editor: Ed Braman

No. overall	No. in series	Title	Directed and filmed by	Original release date
66	1	"Haiti: Showdown in Sun City"	Robin Barnwell	13 April 2007
Sandra Jordan hosts.
67	2	"Zambia & Congo: China's African Takeover"	Tom Porter	20 April 2007
Aidan Hartley hosts.
68	3	"Ivory Coast: Blood and Chocolate"	James Martin Brabazon	27 April 2007
Evan Williams hosts.
69	4	"Bolivia: Anarchy in the Andes"	Ed Watts	5 May 2007
Hamida Ghafour hosts.
70	5	"Chongqing: Invisible City"	Nick Sturdee	11 May 2007
Ramita Navai hosts.
71	6	"Zimbabwe: Mugabe's Reign of Terror"	Siobhan Sinnerton	18 May 2007
Evan Williams hosts.
72	7	"Kosovo: State of Denial"	Robin Barnwell	25 May 2007
Sam Kiley hosts.
73	8	"East Timor: Birth of a Nation"	Nick Sturdee	1 June 2007
Sharmeen Obaid-Chinay hosts.
74	9	"Israel's Wild West"	Ed Watts	8 June 2007
Sandra Jordan hosts.
75	10	"Mongolia: Ninja Nation"	James Martin Brabazon	15 June 2007
Aidan Hartley hosts.

=== Series 14 (2007) ===
No. overall	No. in series	Title	Directed and filmed by	Original release date
76	1	"Jamaica: Guns, Votes and Money"	James Martin Brabazon	14 September 2007
Evan Williams hosts.
77	2	"India's Broken People"	Siobhan Sinnerton	21 September 2007
Ramita Navai hosts.
78	3	"South Africa: Children of the Lost Generation"	Paul Kittel	28 September 2007
Sam Kiley hosts.
79	4	"Guinea-Bissau: Cocaine Country"	Edward Watts	5 October 2007
Kate Seelye hosts.
80	5	"Honduras: The War on Children"	George Waldrum	12 October 2007
Jenny Kleeman hosts.
81	6	"China's Olympic Lie"	Andrew Carter	19 October 2007
Aidan Hartley hosts.
82	7	"Iraq: The Battle for Oil"	Paul Kittel	26 October 2007
Evan Williams hosts.
83	8	"Colombia: Cocaine City"	James Martin Brabazon	2 November 2007
Hamida Ghafour hosts.
84	9	"Sri Lanka: Killing for Peace"	Siobhan Sinnerton	9 November 2007
Sandra Jordan hosts.
85	10	"Congo: Children of the Genocide"	Edward Watts	16 November 2007
Sam Kiley hosts.

=== Series 15 (2008) ===
No. overall	No. in series	Title	Directed and filmed by	Original release date
86	1	"Egypt's Rubbish People"	James Martin Brabazon	8 February 2008
Evan Williams hosts.
87	2	"USA: The Devil's Highway"	Julie Noon	15 February 2008
Aidan Hartley hosts.
88	3	"Nicaragua: Blood, Church and State"	Paul Kittel	22 February 2008
Kate Seelye hosts.
89	4	"Russia: Railway of Bones"	Nick Sturdee	29 February 2008
Sam Kiley hosts.
90	5	"Bangladesh: The Drowning Country"	Andy Wells	7 March 2008
Ramita Navai hosts.
91	6	"Sudan: Meet the Janjaweed"	Andrew Carter	14 March 2008
Nima Elbagir hosts.
92	7	"Gaza: Reign of the Rockets"	Edward Watts	28 March 2008
Sam Kiley hosts.
93	8	"Benin: Voodoo Children"	James Martin Brabazon	4 April 2008
Evan Williams hosts.
94	9	"Brazil: The Amazon's Golden Curse"	Paul Kittel	11 April 2008
Jenny Kleeman hosts.
95	10	"Kenya's Human Time Bomb"	George Waldrum	18 April 2008
Aidan Hartley hosts.

=== Series 16 (2008) ===
No. overall	No. in series	Title	Directed and filmed by	Original release date
96	1	"South Africa: Body Parts for Sale"	James Martin Brabazon	17 October 2008
Ramita Navai hosts.
97	2	"India: God's Own Country"	Edward Watts	24 October 2008
Jenny Kleeman hosts.
98	3	"Abkhazia: Valley of the Lost"	Alex Nott	31 October 2008
Aidan Hartley hosts.
99	4	"Paraguay's Painful Harvest"	Andrew Carter	7 November 2008
Tanya Datta hosts.
100	5	"Philippines: Lost in a Shadow War"	George Waldrum	14 November 2008
Evan Williams hosts. note: scheduled as Philippines' Dirty War
101	6	"Venezuela: Cult of the Thugs"	James Martin Brabazon	21 November 2008
Nima Elbagir hosts.
102	7	"Thailand: Lessons in Terror"	Andy Wells	5 December 2008
Seyi Rhodes hosts.
103	8	"Yemen: Sea of Tears"	Edward Watts	12 December 2008
Aidan Hartley hosts.
104	9	"Mexico: Seven Days in Hell"	Alex Nott	19 December 2008
Evan Williams hosts.
105	10	"Nigeria: Child Brides, Stolen Lives"	Julie Noon	2 January 2009
Ramita Navai hosts. Originally scheduled for 28 November 2008.

=== Series 17 (2009) ===
No. overall	No. in series	Title	Directed and filmed by	Original release date
106	1	"Congo: Forest of the Dead"	Ed Watts	13 March 2009
Nima Elbagir hosts.
107	2	"Cambodia: Selling the Killing Fields"	Andy Wells	20 March 2009
Jenny Kleeman hosts.
108	3	"Turkey: Killing for Honour"	Matt Haan	27 March 2009
Ramita Navai hosts.
109	4	"Sierra Leone: Insanity of War"	George Waldrum	3 April 2009
Seyi Rhodes hosts.
110	5	"Haiti: The Island That Ate Itself"	Alex Nott	10 April 2009
Aidan Hartley hosts.
111	6	"China and North Korea: The Great Escape"	Sam Farmar	17 April 2009
Oliver Steeds hosts.
112	7	"India: Children of the Inferno"	Edward Watts	24 April 2009
Aidan Hartley hosts.
113	8	"Afghanistan: Waiting for the Taliban"	Alex Nott	1 May 2009
Peter Oborne hosts.
114	9	"Papua New Guinea: Bush Knives and Black Magic"	Katherine Churcher	8 May 2009
Ramita Navai hosts.
115	10	"Brazil: The Killables"	Paul Kittel	15 May 2009
Evan Williams hosts.

=== Series 18 (2009) ===
No. overall	No. in series	Title	Directed and filmed by	Original release date
116	1	"Ingushetia: Russia's Dirty War"	Clancy Chassay	25 September 2009
Evan Williams hosts.
117	2	"Philippines: Holy Warriors"	George Waldrum	2 October 2009
Peter Oborne hosts.
118	3	"Peru: Blood and Oil"	Alex Nott	9 October 2009
Ramita Navai hosts.
119	4	"Liberia: Stolen Childhood"	Matt Haan	16 October 2009
Jenny Kleeman hosts.
120	5	"Guatemala: Riding With The Devil"	Matt Haan	23 October 2009
Seyi Rhodes hosts.
121	6	"Greece: The Unwanted"	Jacob Waite	30 October 2009
Jenny Kleeman hosts.
122	7	"South Sudan: How to Fuel a Famine"	Julie Noon	6 November 2009
Ramita Navai hosts.
123	8	"Nepal: The Living Dead"	Katherine Churcher	13 November 2009
Yemi Ipaye hosts.
124	9	"Malaysia: Refugees for sale"	George Waldrum	20 November 2009
Aidan Hartley hosts.
125	10	"Israel: The Battle for Israel's Soul"	Alex Nott	27 November 2009
Evan Williams hosts.

=== Series 19 (2010) ===
No. overall	No. in series	Title	Directed and filmed by	Original release date
126	1	"East Africa: End of the Elephant?"	Alex Nott	26 March 2010
Aidan Hartley hosts.
127	2	"Nigeria's Killing Fields"	Andy Wells	2 April 2010
Peter Oborne hosts.
128	3	"Pakistan's Terror Central"	Will West	9 April 2010
Evan Williams hosts.
129	4	"Malawi: Tobacco's Child Workers"	Julie Noon	14 May 2010
Jenny Kleeman hosts.
130	5	"Inside Burma's Secret State"	Simon Phillips	21 May 2010
Seyi Rhodes hosts.
131	6	"Iraq's Next Battlefield"	Matt Haan	28 May 2010
Evan Williams hosts.
132	7	"Bolivia's Child Miners"	Matt Haan	4 June 2010
Seyi Rhodes hosts.
133	8	"El Salvador: The Child Assassins"	Alex Nott	11 June 2010
Ramita Navai hosts.
134	9	"USA: Down and Out"	Clancy Chassay	25 June 2010
Ramita Navai hosts.
135	10	"Colombia's Dying Tribes"	Katherine Churcher	2 July 2010
Aidan Hartley hosts.

=== Series 20 (2010) ===
No. overall	No. in series	Title	Directed and filmed by	Original release date
136	1	"Uganda: Malaria Town"	William West	1 October 2010
Oliver Steeds hosts.
137	2	"Afghanistan's Child Drug Addicts"	Matt Haan	8 October 2010
Ramita Navai hosts.
138	3	"Philippines: The City with Too Many People"	Richard Cookson	15 October 2010
Jenny Kleeman hosts.
139	4	"Mexico's Indian Rebellion"	Alex Nott	22 October 2010
Evan Williams hosts.
140	5	"Zimbabwe's Blood Diamonds"	Alex Nott	29 October 2010
Ramita Navai hosts.
141	6	"Pakistan: After the Floods"	Simon Phillips	5 November 2010
Peter Oborne hosts.
142	7	"Central African Republic: Witches on Trial"	Julie Noon	12 November 2010
Seyi Rhodes hosts.
143	8	"India: Love on the Run"	Katherine Churcher	19 November 2010
Annie Kelly hosts.
144	9	"Senegal: School for Beggars"	Simon Philips	26 November 2010
Seyi Rhodes hosts.
145	10	"Thailand's Red Fever"	Matt Haan	10 December 2010
Aidan Hartley hosts.

=== Series 21 (2011) ===
No. overall	No. in series	Title	Directed and filmed by	Original release date
146	1	"India's Leprosy Heroes"	Richard Cookson	25 March 2011
Seyi Rhodes hosts.
147	2	"Congo: The Children Who Came Back from the Dead"	Ed Braman	1 April 2011
Aidan Hartley hosts.
148	3	"Nigeria: Sex, Lies and Black Magic"	James Jones	8 April 2011
Jenny Kleeman hosts.
149	4	"Pakistan: Defenders of Karachi"	Edward Watts	15 April 2011
Peter Oborne hosts.
150	5	"China's Lost Sons"	Matt Haan	22 April 2011
Oliver Steeds hosts.
151	6	"Burundi: Boys Behind Bars"	Wael Dabbous	13 May 2011
Ramita Navai hosts.
152	7	"Mexico: Living with Hitmen"	Alex Nott	20 May 2011
Evan Williams hosts.
153	8	"Inside the Battle for Ivory Coast"	Alex Nott	27 May 2011
Seyi Rhodes hosts.
154	9	"Breaking into Israel"	Paul Kittel	3 June 2011
Ramita Navai hosts.
155	10	"Indonesia's Wildlife Warriors"	Rodrigo Vazquez	10 June 2011
Aidan Hartley hosts.

=== Series 22 (2011) ===
No. overall	No. in series	Title	Producer	Original release date
156	1	"South Africa: Trouble in the Townships"	Alex Nott	7 October 2011
Krishnan Guru-Murthy hosts.
157	2	"Undercover Syria"	Wael Dabbous	14 October 2011
Ramita Navai hosts.
158	3	"Uganda's Miracle Babies"	Suemay Oram	21 October 2011
Jenny Kleeman hosts.
159	4	"Nigeria's Millionaire Preachers"	Matt Haan	28 October 2011
Seyi Rhodes hosts.
160	5	"Russia: Vlad's Army"	James Jones	4 November 2011
Peter Oborne hosts.
161	6	"Going for Gold in Gaza"	Richard Cookson	11 November 2011
Aidan Hartley hosts.
162	7	"India's Child Savers"	James Martin Brabazon	18 November 2011
Evan Williams hosts.
163	8	"Trinidad: Guns, Drugs and Secrets"	Will West	25 November 2011
Seyi Rhodes hosts.
164	9	"Honduras: Diving into Danger"	Daniel Bogado	2 December 2011
Jenny Kleeman hosts.
165	10	"Australia's Hidden Valley"	Ed Braman	9 December 2011
Oliver Steeds hosts.

=== Series 23 (2012) ===
No. overall	No. in series	Title	Producer	Original release date
166	1	"Terror in Sudan"	Daniel Bogado	13 April 2012
Aidan Hartley hosts.
167	2	"Iraq: Baghdad Bomb Squad"	Alex Nott	20 April 2012
Krishnan Guru-Murthy hosts.
168	3	"Afghanistan: Lights, Camera, Death Threats"	Andrew Lang	27 April 2012
Jenny Kleeman hosts.
169	4	"Democratic Republic of Congo: Magic, Gangs & Wrestlers"	Wael Dabbous	11 May 2012
Seyi Rhodes hosts.
170	5	"Ukraine: The Teenagers Who Live Underground"	Wael Dabbous	18 May 2012
Marcel Theroux hosts.
171	6	"Cameroon: Last of the Great Apes"	James Martin Brabazon	25 May 2012
Evan Williams hosts.
172	7	"Libya: My Week with Gunmen"	Richard Cookson	1 June 2012
Peter Oborne hosts.
173	8	"Honduras: The Lost Girls"	Talya Tibbon	8 June 2012
Ramita Navai hosts.

=== Series 24 (2012) ===
No. overall	No. in series	Title	Producer	Original release date
174	1	"United States: Talk Radio Nation"	Suemay Oram	2 November 2012
Krishnan Guru-Murthy hosts.
175	2	"Iraq: Indonesia's Tobacco Children"	James Brabazon	9 November 2012
Jonathan Miller hosts.
176	3	"Dominican Republic: Baseball Dreams"	Daniel Bogado	16 November 2012
Seyi Rhodes hosts.
177	4	"The Master Chef of Mogadishu"	John Conroy	23 November 2012
Aidan Hartley hosts.
178	5	"Mumbai's Party Police"	Alex Nott	30 November 2012
Jenny Kleeman hosts.
179	6	"Egypt: Sex, Mobs and Revolution"	Dimitri Collingridge	7 December 2012
Ramita Navai hosts.
180	7	"Russia's Radical Chic"	David Fuller	14 December 2012
Marcel Theroux hosts.
181	8	"Burma: The Village that Took on the Generals"	Wael Dabbous	21 December 2012
Evan Williams hosts.

=== Series 25 (2013) ===
No. overall	No. in series	Title	Producer	Original release date
182	1	"Cuba, Basketball and Betrayal"	David Fuller	12 April 2013
Ade Adepitan hosts
183	2	"Saving Kenya's Street Kids"	Wael Dabbous	19 April 2013
Aidan Hartley hosts.
184	3	"Gaza's Property Ladder"	Daniel Bogado	26 April 2013
Seyi Rhodes hosts.
185	4	"Syria's Rebel Doctor"	James Brabazon	3 May 2013
Evan Williams hosts.
186	5	"Hong Kong's Tiger Tutors"	Lottie Gammon	10 May 2013
Marcel Theroux hosts.
187	6	"Bangladesh Women's Driving School"	Elizabeth C Jones	17 May 2013
Clemency Burton-Hill hosts.
188	7	"Yemen: Death Row Teenager"	Daniel Bogado	24 May 2013
Reporter Krishnan Guru-Murthy hosts.
189	8	"Making Brazil Beautiful"	Suemay Oram	31 May 2013
Seyi Rhodes hosts.

=== Series 26 (2013) ===
No. overall	No. in series	Title	Producer	Original release date
190	1	"Afghanistan's Hunted Women"	Wael Dabbous	4 October 2013
Krishnan Guru-Murthy hosts.
191	2	"Venezuela's Kidnap Cops"	James Brabazon	11 October 2013
Kiki King hosts.
192	3	"China's Lonely Hearts"	Frankie Fathers	18 October 2013
Reporter Marcel Theroux hosts.
193	4	"Mexico: The Abandoned"	Daniel Bogado	25 October 2013
Reporter Ade Adepitan hosts.
194	5	"India's Slumkid Reporters"	Suzie Samant	1 November 2013
Mary-Ann Ochota hosts. It tells the story of Balaknama, a newspaper run by children living in Delhi's slums.
195	6	"Egypt's Tomb Raiders"	Alex Nott	8 November 2013
Aidan Hartley hosts.
196	7	"The Jungle Midwife"	Wael Dabbous	15 November 2013
Seyi Rhodes hosts.
197	8	"Nepal: The Orphan Business"	Laura Warner	22 November 2013
Evan Williams hosts.

=== Series 27 (2014) ===
No. overall	No. in series	Title	Producer	Original release date
198	1	"The World's Dirtiest River"	Hugo Ward	11 April 2014
Seyi Rhodes hosts.
199	2	"Dancing in the Danger Zone"	Marcel Mettelsiefen	18 April 2014
Evan Williams hosts.
200	3	"Kickboxing Kids"	Daniel Bogado	25 April 2014
Mary-Ann Ochota hosts.
201	4	"Carjack City"	James Brabazon	2 May 2014
Reporter Marcel Theroux hosts.
202	5	"The Cursed Twins"	David Fuller	9 May 2014
Reporter Kiki King hosts.
203	6	"Neighbours at War"	Adam Pletts	16 May 2014
Reporter Krishnan Guru-Murthy hosts.
204	7	"Jamaica's Underground Gays"	Andrew Carter	23 May 2014
Ade Adepitan hosts.
205	8	"Africa's Drug Scandal"	Daniel Bogado	30 May 2014
Krishnan Guru-Murthy hosts.

=== Series 28 (2014) ===
No. overall	No. in series	Title	Producer	Original release date
206	1	"Sierra Leone: Surviving Ebola"	Wael Dabbous	26 September 2014
Shaunagh Connaire hosts.
207	2	"Vietnam's Dog Snatchers"	Daniel Bogado	3 October 2014
Nelufar Hedayat hosts.
208	3	"Lebanon: The Invisible People"	David Fuller	10 October 2014
Giles Duley hosts.
209	4	"Siberia's Next Supermodel"	Billy Dosanjh	24 October 2014
Marcel Theroux hosts.
210	5	"India's Electric Dreams"	Hugo Ward	2 November 2014
Krishnan Guru-Murthy hosts.
211	6	"Honduras: The Kids of Murder High"	Nick Blakemore	7 November 2014
Reporter Ade Adepitan hosts.
212	7	"Libya: Tripoli Burning"	Laura Warner	14 November 2014
Seyi Rhodes hosts.
213	8	"Fifteen and Learning to Speak"	Daniel Bogado	21 November 2014
Kiki King hosts.

=== Series 29 (2015) ===
No. overall	No. in series	Title	Producer	Original release date
214	1	"Syria: The City That Beat ISIS"	James Brabazon	27 March 2015
Kiki King hosts.
215	2	"America's Cowboy Kids"	Hugo Ward	3 April 2015
Shaunagh Connaire hosts.
216	3	"Standing Up to Mugabe"	Karolina Mottram	10 April 2015
Seyi Rhodes hosts.
217	4	"Vaccination Wars"	Leslie Knott	17 April 2015
Nelufar Hedayat hosts.
218	5	"40 Years to Find My Family"	Daniel Bogado	24 April 2015
Krishnan Guru-Murthy hosts.
219	6	"Generation Football"	Billy Dosanjh	1 May 2015
Ade Adepitan hosts.
220	7	"The Black Mambas: Saving the Rhino"	Laura Warner	8 May 2015
Evan Williams hosts.
221	8	"Miss Crimea"	Nick Sturdee	15 May 2015
Marcel Theroux hosts.

=== Series 30 (2015) ===
No. overall	No. in series	Title	Producer	Original release date
222	1	"China's Gay Shock Therapy"	Patrick Wells	9 October 2015
Shaunagh Connaire hosts.
223	2	"The Fight for Sight"	Joyce Trozzo	16 October 2015
Ade Adepitan hosts.
224	3	"The Girl Who Lost Her Face"	Lesley Knott	23 October 2015
Giles Duley hosts.
225	4	"Frontline Family Reunions"	Karim Shah	30 October 2015
Morland Sanders hosts.
226	5	"The Mafia Hunter"	Paul Kittel	6 November 2015
Krishnan Guru-Murthy travels to Sicily to meet Pino Maniaci and the team behind community TV station Telejato.
227	6	"Mexico's Baby Business"	Ruhi Hamid	13 November 2015
Kiki King hosts.
228	7	"30 Years a Slave"	Lottie Gammon	20 November 2015
Marcel Theroux hosts.
229	8	"Brazil's Child Preachers"	Alanis Santos	27 November 2015
Seyi Rhodes hosts.

=== Series 31 (2016) ===
No. overall	No. in series	Title	Producer	Original release date
230	1	"Malaysia: Muslim, Trans and Banned"	Victoria Bell	18 March 2016
Marcel Theroux hosts.
231	2	"Venezuela: Find My Kid Drugs"	Patrick Wells	25 March 2016
Krishnan Guru-Murthy hosts.
232	3	"Pakistan: The City with No Water"	Karim Shah	1 April 2016
Fazeelat Aslam hosts.
233	4	"Mission Critical - Afghanistan"	Will West & Shoaib Sharifi	8 April 2016
Abigail Austen hosts.
234	5	"USA: How to Stop a Murder"	Simon Rawles	15 April 2016
Seyi Rhodes hosts.
235	6	"The Forgotten Holocaust Survivors"	Eric McFarland	22 April 2016
Krishan Guru-Murthy hosts.
236	7	"The Betrayal of Kenya's Athletes"	Karolina Mottram & Callum Macrae	29 April 2016
Ade Adepitan hosts.
237	8	"Iran's Dating Revolution"	Adam Patterson	6 May 2016
Shaunagh Connaire hosts.

=== Series 32 (2016) ===
No. overall	No. in series	Title	Producer	Original release date
238	1	"Yemen: Britain's Unseen War"	Patrick Wells	30 September 2016
Krishnan Guru-Murthy hosts.
239	2	"India's Blind Daters"	Daniel Bogado	7 October 2016
Marcel Theroux hosts.
240	3	"Exiled: Europe's Gay Refugees"	Rebecca Kenna	14 October 2016
Shaunagh Connaire hosts.
241	4	"Vietnam's Toxic Legacy"	Vicki Cooper	28 October 2016
Ade Adepitan hosts.
242	5	"Borneo: The Fish Bombers"	Jessica Kelly	4 November 2016
Benjamin Zand hosts.
243	6	"Haiti: The Prison from Hell"	Kate Godfrey	11 November 2016
Seyi Rhodes hosts.
244	7	"South Africa's Skin-Bleaching Scandal"	Simon Rawles	18 November 2016
Tania Rashid hosts.
245	8	"Mozambique: Sex for Grades"	Karim Shah	25 November 2016
Kiki King hosts.

=== Series 33 (2017) ===
No. overall	No. in series	Title	Producer	Original release date
246	1	"Peru's Monkey Business"	Will West	17 March 2017
Ade Adepitan hosts.
247	2	"Putin's Family Values"	Jessica Kelly	24 March 2017
Marcel Theroux hosts.
248	3	"Making America Read"	Karolina Mottram	31 March 2017
Kiki King hosts.
249	4	"Dying To Come To Britain"	Andrew Carter	7 April 2017
Shaunagh Connaire hosts.
250	5	"Burma's Broken Dream"	Karim Shah	14 April 2017
Krishnan Guru-Murthy hosts.
251	6	"North Korea's Reality Stars"	Kate Hardie-Buckley	21 April 2017
Seyi Rhodes hosts.
252	7	"Obesity in Paradise"	Paddy Wells	28 April 2017
Sophie Morgan hosts.
253	8	"Africa's Superstar Gladiators"	Jessica Kelly	5 May 2017
Seyi Rhodes hosts.

=== Series 34 (2017) ===
No. overall	No. in series	Title	Producer	Original release date
254	1	"China's Pop Idols"	Sarah Collinson	29 September 2017
Marcel Theroux hosts.
255	2	"Ireland's Big Decision"	Kate Hardie-Buckley	6 October 2017
Shaunagh Connaire hosts.
256	3	"Africa's Perfect Storm"	Jessica Kelly	13 October 2017
Seyi Rhodes hosts.
257	4	"India's Cow Vigilantes"	Marco Salustro	20 October 2017
Seyi Rhodes hosts.
258	5	"The Witch Hunters"	Eric McFarland	27 October 2017
Ade Adepitan hosts.
259	6	"Mexico's Beach Wars"	Patrick Wells	3 November 2017
Krishnan Guru-Murthy hosts.
260	7	"Rebuilding Generation War"	Jessica Kelly	10 November 2017
Yousra Elbagir hosts.
261	8	"Australia's Boys Behind Bars"	Simon Rawles	17 November 2017

=== Series 35 (2018) ===
No. overall	No. in series	Title	Producer	Original release date
262	1	"Mogadishu 999"	Sasha Achilli	20 April 2018
Seyi Rhodes hosts.
263	2	"The World's Dirtiest Air"	Kate Hardie-Buckley	27 April 2018
Marcel Theroux hosts.
264	3	"Kidnapped in Kabul"	Karim Shah	4 May 2018
Rania Abouzeid hosts.
265	4	"Evil in Paradise"	Jamie Welham	11 May 2018
Krishnan Guru-Murthy hosts.
266	5	"Bollywood #MeToo"	Alicia Arce	18 May 2018
Sahar Zand hosts.
267	6	"Rio: Caught in the Crossfire"	Johnny McDevitt	25 May 2018
Ade Adepitan hosts.

=== Series 36 (2018) ===
No. overall	No. in series	Title	Producer	Original release date
268	1	"Venezuela's Lost Children"	Nicholas Blakemore	2 November 2018
Krishnan Guru-Murthy hosts.
269	2	"India's Love Cheat Detectives"	Charlie Mole	9 November 2018
Nelufar Hedayat hosts.
270	3	"North Korea's Greatest Show"	Karim Shah	16 November 2018
Marcel Theroux hosts.
271	4	"South Africa's Deadly Gold Rush"	Eric McFarland	23 November 2018
Seyi Rhodes hosts.
272	5	"One-Way Ticket to Gangland"	Jamie Welham	30 November 2018
Krishnan Guru-Murthy hosts.
273	6	"Forced to be Fat"	Mauricio Gris	7 December 2018
Sahar Zand hosts.

=== Series 37 (2019) ===
No. overall	No. in series	Title	Producer	Original release date
274	1	"Carnival Wars"	Kate Hardie-Buckley	20 April 2019
Seyi Rhodes hosts.
275	2	"Banged Up for Blasphemy"	Masood Khan	27 April 2019
Marcel Theroux hosts.
276	3	"Mafia Showdown"	Nicholas Blakemore	3 May 2019
Krishnan Guru-Murthy hosts.
277	4	"Girls Behind Bars"	Leslie Knott	10 May 2019
Datshiane Navanayagam hosts
278	5	"Censored"	Roland Doust	17 May 2019
Sahar Zand hosts.
279	6	"Forest of Fear"	Karim Shah	24 May 2019
Ade Adepitan hosts.

=== Series 38 (2019) ===
No. overall	No. in series	Title	Producer	Original release date
280	1	"Hurricane Hell"	Nick Blakemore	8 November 2019
Seyi Rhodes hosts.
281	2	"Schools Under Siege"	Tom Cross	15 November 2019
Adnan Sarwar hosts.
282	3	"Social Media Martyrs"	Katie Arnold	22 November 2019
Sahar Zand hosts.
283	4	"Timbuktu's Lost Treasures"	Karim Shah	6 December 2019
Krishnan Guru-Murthy hosts.

=== Series 39 (2020) ===
No. overall	No. in series	Title	Producer	Original release date
284	1	"Schoolgirl Pin-ups"	Liam Nolan	7 August 2020
Marcel Theroux hosts.
285	2	"Trump's Housewives"	Charlie Mole	14 August 2020
Karishma Vyas hosts.
286	3	"Swarm Chasers"	Karim Shah	21 August 2020
Sahar Zand hosts.
287	4	"Nirvana for Sale"	Tosca Barnes	28 August 2020
Marcel Theroux hosts.
288	5	"Death in the Alps"	Tom Cross	4 September 2020
Adnan Sarwar hosts.

=== Series 40 (2021) ===
No. overall	No. in series	Title	Producer	Original release date
289	1	"Dying for Democracy"	Katie Arnold	14 May 2021
Maung Moe hosts.
290	2	"Uprooted by the Climate Crisis"	Steven Grandison	21 May 2021
Guillermo Galdos hosts.
291	3	"Thailand's Tiger Kingpins"	Anneliese McAuliffe	28 May 2021
Jonathan Miller hosts.
292	4	"New York's Homeless Epidemic"	Nick Blakemore	4 June 2021
Krishnan Guru-Murthy hosts.
293	5	"Love Under Siege"	Wil Davies	18 June 2021
Yousra Elbagir hosts.
294	6	"Beaten Back"	Dani Isdale	25 June 2021
Seyi Rhodes hosts.

=== Series 41 (2021) ===
No. overall	No. in series	Title	Producer	Original release date
295	1	"Mexico's deadly Coca-Cola addiction"	Nick Blakemore	1 October 2021
Guillermo Galdos hosts.
296	2	"Vanished: America's Missing Indigenous Women"	Tom Besley	8 October 2021
Ayshah Tull hosts.
297	3	"Selling surrogates: wombs for hire in Georgia"	Theopi Skarlatos	22 October 2021
Anja Popp hosts.
298	4	"The Toxic Cost of Going Green"	Girish Juneja	29 October 2021
Jamal Osman hosts.
299	5	"Surfing for change: Senegal's female surfers"	Katie Arnold	19 November 2021
Minnie Stephenson hosts.
300	6	"Justice for Japan's war time sex slaves"	Nancy Roberts	26 November 2021
Krishnan Guru-Murthy hosts.

=== Series 42 (2022) ===
No. overall	No. in series	Title	Producer	Original release date
301	1	"Anti-vax preachers and the race to vaccinate South Sudan"	Wil Davies	27 March 2022
Seyi Rhodes hosts.
302	2	"Thailand's cryptocurrency gold rush"	Anneliese McAuliffe	3 April 2022
Jonathan Miller hosts.
303	3	"Ghana: fast fashion's dumping ground"	Toby Bakare	10 April 2022
Ashionye Ogene hosts.
304	4	"Cocaine, cartels, and crime in Ecuador"	Thom Walker	24 April 2022
Guillermo Galdos hosts.
305	5	"Fentanyl's deadly grip on St. Louis"	Nick Blakemore	1 May 2022
Krishnan Guru-Murthy hosts.
306	6	"Gender violence in Pakistan: women fighting back"	Masood Khan	15 May 2022
Fatima Manji hosts.

=== Series 43 (2022) ===
No. overall	No. in series	Title	Producer	Original release date
307	1	"Children for Sale: Texas' Trafficked Kids"	Liam O'Hare	30 October 2022
Yousra Elbagir hosts.
308	2	"The dark secrets of sumo wrestling"	Katie Arnold	6 November 2022
Sahar Zand hosts.
309	3	"Pregnant and trapped: Guatemala's child mums"	Amy Gardner	13 November 2022
Anja Popp hosts.
310	4	"Gaza: The dangers of underground art"	Nick Blakemore	27 November 2022
Jonathan Miller hosts.
311	5	"The Kenyan farmers killed for their crops"	Wil Davies	4 December 2022
Seyi Rhodes hosts.
312	6	"The Psychedelic Toad Revolution"	Leila Lak	11 December 2022
Guillermo Galdos hosts.

=== Series 44 (2023) ===
No. overall	No. in series	Title	Producer	Original release date
313	1	"Bank Raiders of Beirut"	TBA	14 April 2023
314	2	"Your Phone’s Dirty Gold"	TBA	21 April 2023
315	3	"Inside Little North Korea"	TBA	28 April 2023
316	4	"India's Leopard Attacks"	TBA	12 May 2023
317	5	"Drag Queen Culture Wars"	TBA	19 May 2023

=== Series 45 (2023) ===
No. overall	No. in series	Title	Producer	Original release date
318	1	"Kenya’s Christian Death Cult"	TBA	20 October 2023
319	2	"Mexico’s Exotic Pet Trade"	TBA	27 October 2023
320	3	"Taiwan - Prepping for War"	TBA	10 November 2023
321	4	"Inside Romania’s Witch School"	TBA	24 November 2023
322	5	"Sweden: A Gangster’s Paradise"	TBA	1 December 2023

=== Series 46 (2024) ===
No. overall	No. in series	Title	Producer	Original release date
323	1	"Campus Wars USA"	TBA	29 March 2024
324	2	"Haiti: Pregnant and on the Run"	TBA	12 April 2024
325	3	"Divorce Mauritania Style"	TBA	10 May 2024
326	4	"Romania’s Timber Mafia"	TBA	17 May 2024
327	5	"Inside the K-Pop Dream Machine"	TBA	24 May 2024

=== Series 47 (2024) ===
No. overall	No. in series	Title	Producer	Original release date
328	1	"Inside Spain's Narco-Submarines"	TBA	15 November 2024
329	2	"Brazil: The Great Land Grab"	TBA	22 November 2024
330	3	"Hip Hop Pakistani Style"	TBA	29 November 2024
331	4	"Locked up in Mexico"	TBA	6 December 2024
332	5	"Homeless in Sin City"	TBA	13 December 2024

=== Series 48 (2025) ===
No. overall	No. in series	Title	Producer	Original release date
333	1	"Crisis in Sudan: The Fight for Survival"	TBA	14 March 2025
334	2	"South Africa's Discipline Camps Exposed"	TBA	21 March 2025
335	3	"France's Far Right Feminists"	TBA	28 March 2025
336	4	"Elon Musk's Rainforest Revolution"	TBA	4 April 2025
337	5	"Gaza Weddings"	TBA	18 April 2025

=== Series 49 (2025) ===
No. overall	No. in series	Title	Producer	Original release date
338	1	"Sex, Power, Money: South Africa’s Slay Queens "	TBA	24 October 2025
339	2	"Guns and Cocaine: Colombia"	TBA	31 October 2025
340	3	"USA: Trump’s Immigration Crackdown"	TBA	7 November 2025
341	4	"Inside Israel’s Unsolved Murders"	TBA	14 November 2025
342	5	"Inside Tenerife’s Squatter Wars "	TBA	21 November 2025

=== Series 50 (2026) ===
No. overall	No. in series	Title	Producer	Original release date
343	1	"Censored Film Queens of Nigeria"	TBA	10 April 2026
344	2	"Japan's Shoplifting Pensioners"	TBA	17 April 2026
345	3	"Children in the Crossfire"	TBA	24 April 2026
346	4	"America's Drug War: Puerto Rico"	TBA	1 May 2026
347	5	"Faith Healers: Saints or Scammers?"	TBA	15 May 2026

== International ==
In the United States, the series aired on Fusion on 11 November 2015. For the US version, it was hosted by Dan Lieberman, Kimberly Brooks, and Mariana Atencio. The episodes were randomised and chosen from the more recent seasons.

== Awards ==
- Award for the Global Defence of Human Rights Recipient, 2007 - International Service
- The 2011 episode Undercover Syria won a BAFTA award.
