= Telejato =

Television station in Palermo, Sicily, Italy

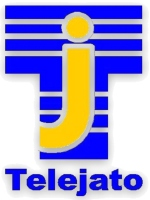
- Country: Italy
- Broadcast area: Palermo, Sicily
- Headquarters: Partinico

Programming
- Picture format: 1080i HDTV

Ownership
- Owner: Pino Maniaci

History
- Launched: 1989

Links
- Website: Telejato.it

Availability

Terrestrial
- Digital terrestrial television: 195 Mux locale 3 sicilia

Streaming media
- Tele Jato in Diretta: https://www.telejato.it/

Telejato is an independent television station based in the town of Partinico, in Sicily, Italy, and managed by Pino Maniaci, broadcasting since 1989. It became widely known for its anti-Mafia reporting.

== History ==
The station was founded in 1989 by Alberto Lo Iacono and subsequently sold to the Italian Communist Refoundation Party (Partito della Rifondazione Comunista or PRC) which, in turn, sold it, in 1999, to Giuseppe "Pino" Maniaci, a Sicilian building-contractor and entreprenuer.

At the time of its purchase by Maniaci, the station was ostensibly in a state of "impending financial collapse", due to the debts incurred by its previous management. Moreover, its classification as "community television" carried an advertising limit of three minutes per hour. Maniaci's stated intention was to turn his mostly family-run Telejato into a "miniature, amateur CNN", as he called it, and, therefore, "the world’s longest TV news programme" was born, with a total of two hours of service, from 2:30 pm until 4:30pm.

Gradually, Telejato turned to investigative reportage, first turning its attention to local polluters. The station has been sued "more than 200 times" from Distilleria Bertolino alone, on account of the many reportages carried out by Telejato into alleged pollution by the distillery factory.

The Sicilian Mafia eventually became the station's main subject of reporting.

On 5 May 2022, Maniaci announced live on television the shutdown of its historic transmitter after 33 years of usage, consequence of the switch off: Telejato, in fact, was not included in the list of stations making the conversion to the second generation of digital terrestrial television. At the same time it launched a crowdfunding campaign using the GoFundMe platform to gather funds to convert to the DVB-T2 standard. On 1 January 2023, Pino Maniaci announced the opening of Telejato's new digital LCN (195), made possibile thanks to the donations obtained up until that point, and relaunched funds to cover maintenance costs for the entire year, at the sum of €40,000. The station is also available on mobile apps available on the Play Store and Apple Store, on smart TVs on channel 15 and accessing the Telejato section after clicking the central button of the remote control.

== Audience ==
Telejato's signal covered the provinces of Palermo and Trapani, with an approximate target viewership of 150,000 people. Pino Maniaci announces that on 28 April 2021 the Telejato's signal covers all provinces of Sicily.

On 1 January 2023 Pino Maniaci announced the opening of the new Telejato television channel on LCN 195 of digital terrestrial television, made possible thanks to the donations collected up to that point, and relaunched the fundraising campaign to cover the maintenance costs for the entire year which amounted to 40,000 euros. It is now also visible on the “Telejato” app available on the Play Store and Apple Store, on smart TVs by dialing channel 15 and accessing the Telejato section after clicking the central button on the remote control.

== Intimidation ==
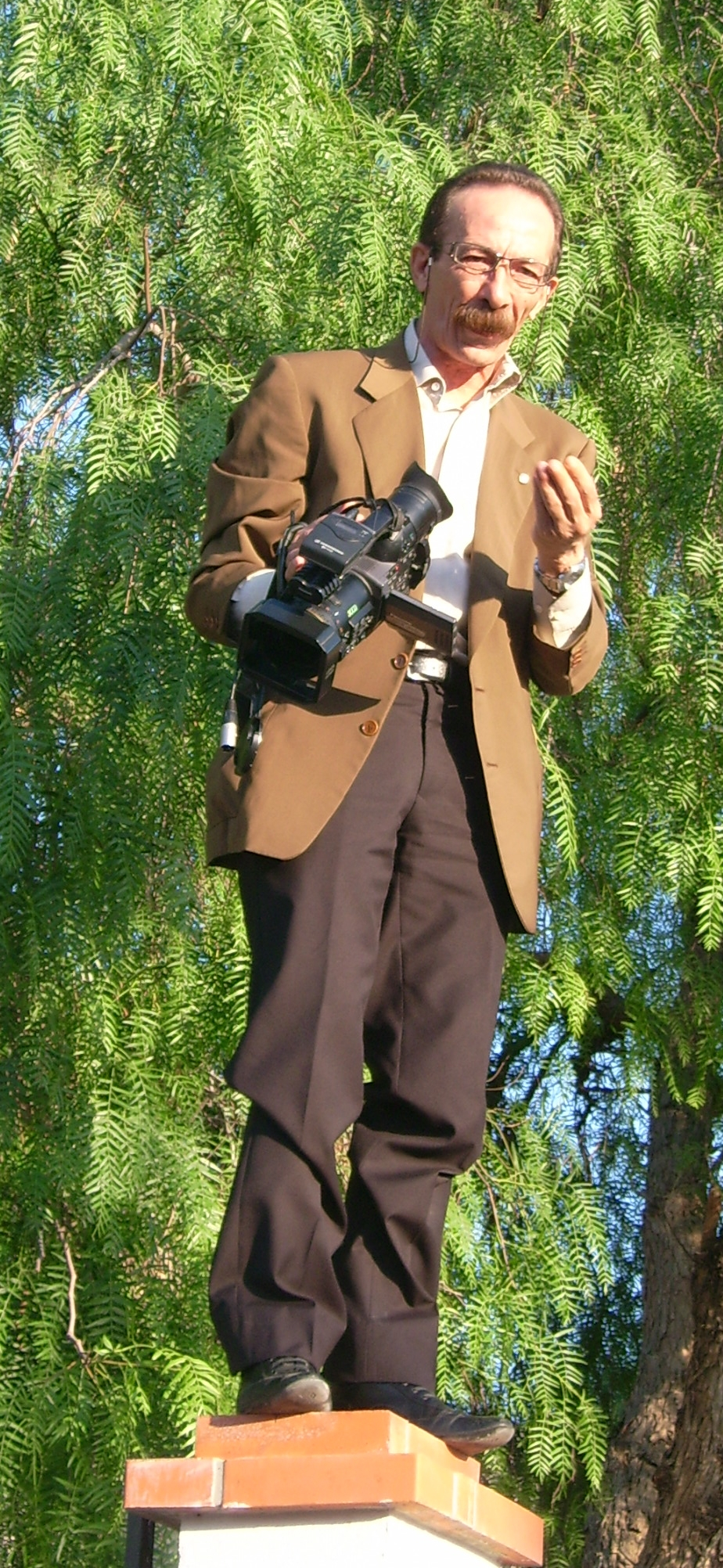
Pino Maniaci filming an event in memory of Giuseppe Impastato, in Cinisi, Sicily, May 2010

Telejato's owner and most of the people working there have reported receiving anonymous threats against their lives and their families' well-being, all of which, they claim, come from local Mafia bosses who are upset with the publicity caused by the station's anti-Mafia activity.

In 2007, Telejato's reporting on the unauthorised use of an extended land area by cattle barns that allegedly belonged to local, Mafia-affiliated families and had been operating there for more than twenty years, led to renewed threats. Pino's daughter, Letizia, hung placards outside the stables, reading "Stables of shame." The next day, Pino Maniaci was allegedly beaten by two unknown teenagers in the street and taken to hospital. After receiving first aid assistance, Maniaci left the hospital and, with bruises and cuts visible on his face, went on the air to denounce from Telejato, once more, the ostensibly Maffia-run cattle business. Soon after, the Italian carabinieri, in a combined anti-Mafia operation, closed down the illegal barns in the area.

In July 2008, Pino Maniaci's car, parked outside his home, was "doused with gasoline" and set on fire. This episode is part of what Maniaci says is a constant process of threats, manifesting in "countless attacks", such as slashed tyres or severed brake cables in the cars he uses and even windscreens shattered by gunshots. Maniaci was subsequently granted police protection.

The website of Telejato has often been blocked or rendered inaccessible to web search engines, allegedly as a result of Mafia-ordered hacking.

In September 2011, many abusive and threatening graffiti messages appeared on the walls of the town of Partinico, such as "You've ruined this country!" and "The ruling has been issued", ostensibly directed against Maniaci. The federation of Italian journalists and the Sicilian federation of journalists expressed their solidarity with Telejato.

In December 2014, Maniaci found the two dogs he kept at home hung from a post near the station's studio. Maniaci linked the incident to Telejato's coverage of drug use in the area. "The city is awash with cocaine, and we have been going very hard on that," he stated to the press. "Cosa Nostra is always behind things like that."

== Accolades ==
Letizia Maniaci, Pino's daughter and Telejato's main reporter (Maniaci's son Giovanni also works at the station), has been awarded the Maria Grazia Cutuli journalism award for her work. Letizia Maniaci has written a book about her life, working in Telejato, which was published in Italy by Rizzoli, in March 2009.

== Adversities ==
=== Journalism without a license ===
In 2009, Pino Maniaci was indicted by Palermo public prosecutor Paoletta Caltabellotta for exercising the journalistic profession "without the necessary state license." The indictment did not reach the courts, as Maniaci was given honoris causa a journalistic license by the Italian federation of journalists.

=== Libel suit ===
On 21 April 2016, an article signed by Salvo Vitale on Telejato's Voce della Sicilia webpage alleged that the president of the Court of Auditors Luciana Savagnone got her sports journalist son-in-law hired by the radio station TRM through personal connections. Savagnone sued for libel and in September 2018, Maniaci, Vitale, and Telejato manager Riccardo Orioles were found guilty and sentenced to a fine of a total of 15,000 Euros.

== Extortion indictment ==
In April 2016, Salvo Lo Biundo and Gioacchino De Luca, the mayors of Partinico and Borgetto respectively, submitted a complaint against Maniaci, accusing him of demanding bribes so that Telejato "would go easy on them." Maniaci denied the charges, stating that the mayors were among those Telejato was almost daily reporting for incompetence. An investigation was opened by the office of the Palermo public prosecutor Nino Di Matteo.

In May 2016, Palermo Deputy Prosecutor Vittorio Teresi detailed the accusations against Maniaci in a news conference where he attacked the journalist's status as "a champion of anti-corruption," stating: "The fight against the Mafia is done without personal interests. We do not need the anti-Mafia services of Mr. Pino Maniaci." Chief Prosecutor Francesco Lo Voi also appeared before the media, claiming Maniaci "has repeatedly shown a total disregard for established authority, the police and the judiciary." The Palermo authorities banned Maniaci away from Partinico, arguing he was "using his television show for leverage."

On 4 April 2017, Maniaci announced with an online message that Telejato would close down, using the phrase, "Chi ci ama ci scusi. È stato bello." ("Those who love us, please forgive us. It's been nice.") Maniaci stated that it had become impossible to carry on because the "mud machine operated by the Carabinieri and the Palermo prosecutor's office had caused devastating damages, much more serious than the damage done to the station by the mafiosi who intimidate local businesses away from advertising on Telejato."

The next day, Maniaci announced that he wanted to keep the station going.

On 28 March 2018, the station's chief editor, Francesco Buzzotta, was killed in a head-on collision of his car with a truck on the provincial road between Partinico and Grisì.

=== Trial ===
The trial date was set for 19 July 2017, the anniversary of the 1992 Via D'Amelio bombing in which anti-Mafia magistrate Paolo Borsellino and five members of his police escort were assassinated. Eleven defendants were named, variously charged with mafia association, extortion and real estate fraud, including Maniaci who was charged with extortion.

On the opening day of the trial, the judge Benedetto Giaimo declared that no sound- or image-recording devices would be allowed in the court room, because, as he stated, "the trial holds no social interest," and postponed the trial to the 20th of September. On that date, the judge reversed his decision and allowed cameras in the court room. On 20 November 2017, the trial began, but judge Mauro Terranova, on account of some defendants not having been properly summoned, postponed commencement for 8 January 2018, then for 25 January, and again for 5 March.

On 8 April 2021, Palermo judge Mauro Terranova acquitted Maniaci of the charge for extortion. He sentenced Maniaci to 1 year and 5 months of prison time for defamation of journalist Michele Giuliano, painter Gaetano Porcasi, Nunzio Quatrosi, and Elisabetta Liparoto. Maniaci's lawyer stated they will appeal the guilty verdict for defamation.

== Documentaries about Telejato ==
In 2015, in "The Mafia Hunter" episode of Channel 4's Unreported World, Krishnan Guru-Murthy and director Paul Kittel traveled to Sicily to meet Maniaci and the group of volunteers who run Telejato. In 2021, Netflix released a documentary series about the station, titled Vendetta: Truth, Lies and the Mafia.

== See also ==
- Antonio Scopelliti
- Salvatore Lima
- Giovanni Falcone
- Paolo Borsellino
