= Wittgenstein (film) =

1993 film by Derek Jarman

- UK theatrical release poster
- Directed by: Derek Jarman
- Written by: Derek Jarman; Terry Eagleton; Ken Butler
- Produced by: Tariq Ali
- Starring: Karl Johnson; Michael Gough; Tilda Swinton; John Quentin; Kevin Collins; Clancy Chassay; Nabil Shaban; Sally Dexter; Lynn Seymour
- Cinematography: James Welland
- Edited by: Budge Tremlett
- Music by: Jan Latham-Koenig
- Production companies: Channel Four Television; BFI; Bandung Productions; Uplink
- Distributed by: BFI Productions (United Kingdom); Uplink (Japan)
- Release dates: 16 February 1993 (Berlin); 26 March 1993 (United Kingdom); 26 March 1994 (Japan)
- Running time: 72 minutes
- Countries: United Kingdom; Japan
- Languages: English; Russian
- Budget: £230,000
- Box office: £0.05 million (UK/US)

Wittgenstein is a 1993 experimental comedy-drama film co-written and directed by Derek Jarman, and produced by Tariq Ali. An international co-production of the United Kingdom and Japan, the film is loosely based on the life story, as well as the philosophical thinking of philosopher Ludwig Wittgenstein. The adult Wittgenstein is played by Karl Johnson.

The original screenplay by literary critic Terry Eagleton was heavily rewritten during pre-production and shooting by Jarman, radically altering the style and structure, although retaining much of Eagleton's dialogue. The story is not played out in a traditional setting, but rather against a black backdrop within which the actors and key props are placed, as if in a theatre setting.

The film was originally part of a series of 12 films on the life and ideas of philosophers, produced by Ali on behalf of Channel Four. Only four of the scripts got commissioned: Socrates by Howard Brenton, Spinoza by Ali, Locke by David Edgar and Wittgenstein by Eagleton. Spinoza was filmed and directed by Chris Spencer as Spinoza : The Apostle of Reason. Citizen Locke was filmed and directed by Agnieszka Piotrowska. These were broadcast in 1994 as 52-minute television films.

== Plot ==
The film, in a series of sketches, depicts Wittgenstein's life from boyhood, through the first World War period to his Cambridge professorship and association with Bertrand Russell and John Maynard Keynes. The emphasis is on the exposition of his ideas and depicts his characteristics as a homosexual, an intuitive, moody, proud, and perfectionistic thinker, and a genius.

== Cast ==
- Clancy Chassay as young Wittgenstein
- Karl Johnson as adult Wittgenstein
- Nabil Shaban as Martian
- Michael Gough as Bertrand Russell
- Tilda Swinton as Lady Ottoline Morrell
- John Quentin as Maynard Keynes
- Keith Collins as Johnny
- Lynn Seymour as Lydia Lopokova

== Script ==
- Eagleton, Terry (1993). Wittgenstein: The Terry Eagleton Script, The Derek Jarman Film. London, England: British Film Institute, pp. 151. ISBN 978-0-85170-397-8

== Award ==
- Teddy Award for best feature film, 1993

== Reception ==
Critical reception for the film has been generally positive and the movie holds a rating of 83% on Rotten Tomatoes, based on 6 reviews. Derek Elley of Variety described it as an "immaculately lensed, intellectual joke" with a "gay subtext".

It opened the London Lesbian and Gay Film Festival and grossed a house record £7,210 in its first 3 days at the ICA in London. It grossed £25,000 in the UK. In the United States it grossed $40,029.

== See also ==
- List of avant-garde films of the 1990s
