= Ghafour =

Ghafour is an Arabic surname. Notable people with this surname include:

- Abdul Ghafour (Taliban commander), Taliban commander
- Amir Ghafour (born 1991), Iranian volleyball player
- Emad El-Din Abdel-Ghafour, Egyptian politician and co-founder of the Salafist Islamist Homeland Party
- Hamida Ghafour, Canadian journalist and author of Afghan origin
- Reham Abdel Ghafour (born 1978), Egyptian actress and daughter of the Egyptian actor Ashraf Abdel Ghafour
- Sabi Jahn Abdul Ghafour (1969–2004), Afghan prisoner of the Guantanamo Bay detainment camps
