= Jenny Kleeman =

British filmmaker and journalist

Jenny Naomi Kleeman is a British journalist, author and broadcaster. She presents programmes on BBC Radio 4 and has reported for Channel 4's foreign affairs series Unreported World and BBC One's Panorama. She regularly writes for The Guardian and The Sunday Times Magazine. She won the 2025 Orwell Prize for Journalism.

== Early life ==
Kleeman was educated at Westminster School, a boarding and day independent school in Central London, followed by Queens' College, Cambridge, where she was awarded a double-first Bachelor of Arts in Social and Political Sciences, on 29 June 2001.

Kleeman is Jewish.

== Career ==
Kleeman began working at The Guardian newspaper after a few weeks' work experience. She has reported for HBO's Vice News Tonight, Channel 4's Dispatches, The One Show on BBC One among others, as well as making 13 films for Unreported World. She was nominated for the Amnesty International Gaby Rado Memorial Award for her work on Unreported World.

She has said that she admires the documentaries of Nick Broomfield, Jon Ronson, Charlie Brooker and Paul Foot.

Since June 2015, Kleeman has contributed short documentaries to The Guardian's video output. Her projects so far have included work on revenge porn, indigenous communities, sex robots, and British children born with HIV/AIDS.

Kleeman is a regular on Sky News' Press Preview. She was a launch presenter on Times Radio co-presenting the Friday to Sunday breakfast show.

On BBC Radio 4, Kleeman has presented Woman's Hour, Hotspot, and the documentary series The Gift.

== Bibliography ==
- Sex Robots & Vegan Meat: Adventures at the frontier of Birth, Food, Sex, and Death (2020) Picador ISBN 978-1509894888
- The Price of Life: in Search of What We're Worth and Who Decides (2024) Picador ISBN 978-1035004966
