= Sandra Jordan =

Irish journalist

- Occupation: Television journalist

Sandra Jordan is an Irish television journalist, best known for her investigative visits to many conflict zones around the world for the Channel 4 series Dispatches and Unreported World.

She attended Sacred Heart Secondary School in Westport, County Mayo and in 1987 went on to National University of Ireland, Galway for a degree in English. Temping in journalism led her to the foreign news desk at The Observer in London, where she was promoted to assistant editor. However, the desk job did not suit her, and she moved into television, making documentaries in Latin America for Channel 4.

In March 2003, Jordan was in the Gaza Strip reporting on the Israeli withdrawal from Gaza. She reported on Israeli violence against Palestinians, and interviewed local people and protesters from the International Solidarity Movement within two days of the death of American activist Rachel Corrie. She also covered the killings of British activist Tom Hurndall and filmmaker James Miller. The resulting documentary was aired in June 2003 on Dispatches titled "The Killing Zone".

As well as repeat visits to Gaza, the West Bank, Sri Lanka and Nepal between 2001 and 2007, she reported from Indian Kashmir, Thailand, Colombia, Bolivia, Venezuela, Peru, El Salvador, Mexico, Haiti and the Paris riots of 2005. Jordan and her team repeatedly risked being caught in crossfire and other dangers.

In 2008 she married and returned to Ireland. In 2011 she completed work on her own documentary feature, Little Matador, co-directed with Gabriel Range. The film follows the training of child bullfighters in Mexico.

== See also ==
- Jordan de Exeter, founder of the Jordan family in Mayo
