= Sam Kiley =

British journalist

Sam Kiley (born 1964, Kenya) is World Affairs Editor of The Independent. He covers world affairs as a reporter and commentator and frequently contributes to The Independent's digital video output too.

Until 2024 he was a Senior International Correspondent at CNN. Prior to CNN, he was the Foreign Affairs Editor of Sky News. He is a journalist with more than 35 years' experience, based at different times of his career in London, Los Angeles, Nairobi, Johannesburg and Jerusalem. He has written for The Times, The Observer, The Sunday Times and Mail on Sunday newspapers, The Spectator and New Statesman weekly political news magazines, and reported for BBC Two, Sky One, Channel 4, and lately, Sky News.

On 27 November 2017, it was announced that he would be leaving Sky News and moving to CNN's Abu Dhabi bureau as a senior international correspondent.

== Education ==
Kiley was educated at Eastbourne College, a boarding independent school for boys (now co-educational) in the large coastal town of Eastbourne in East Sussex, followed by Lady Margaret Hall, Oxford, where he studied politics, philosophy and economics, and graduated in 1984.

While at Lady Margaret Hall, he became president of the Oxford University Dramatic Society and played cricket for the university second eleven. He also studied mime and commedia dell'arte under Neil Bartlett, director at the National Theatre and the Royal Shakespeare Company.

== Life and career ==
After leaving Eastbourne College, and before going up to Lady Margaret Hall at Oxford, Kiley was commissioned into the Gurkhas Regiment of the British Army. He resigned from the Army halfway through university.

In 1987, Kiley joined The Times newspaper, where he became an education reporter. Three years later, he joined The Sunday Times newspaper as its US West Coast correspondent. The following year, he moved to Nairobi as The Times' Africa correspondent, from where his coverage of Somalia, Zaire, Rwanda and Sierra Leone won widespread acclaim.

In 1996, Kiley won the Granada Television Foreign Correspondent of the Year award for his coverage of the fall of the regime of President Mobutu in Zaire and, after being promoted to The Times' Africa bureau chief, moved to Johannesburg in South Africa. He was shot covering a coup attempt in Lesotho in 1998.

In 1999, Kiley moved to Jerusalem where he became The Times' Middle East bureau chief for two years, before resigning after a dispute with his editors. Kiley had succeeded in tracking down and interviewing the Israeli soldiers who had shot dead Mohammed al-Durrah, the 12-year-old boy who had become, posthumously, an icon of the intifada. The instruction Kiley received to file his piece "without mentioning the dead kid" was the last straw.

In 2001, he joined the London Evening Standard newspaper as its chief foreign correspondent based in London – covering the wars in Afghanistan and the Second Intifada in the Palestinian Territories.

In 2002, Kiley presented "Truth and Lies in Baghdad", part of Channel 4 television's main current affairs series, Dispatches. He joined the channel full-time the following year and made many more programmes for Dispatches and for Unreported World, for both of which programmes he travelled across the world.

While covering the 2003 invasion of Iraq for Channel 4, he was kidnapped along with his Iraqi helpers and cameraman Nick Hughes, taken into the desert, and narrowly escaped execution due to what appears to have been a fluke.

In 2005, Kiley made two series for Sky One: USA Unsolved with Sam Kiley and Guns for Hire, the latter of which was an investigation into modern mercenaries in the war zones of Congo and Afghanistan.

In November 2006, Kiley produced a BBC2 observational documentary in Afghanistan, The General's War, for which he was granted exclusive and unprecedented access to British NATO General David Richards. He returned to Channel 4, to make films in Cape Town, the Congo, the Palestinian Territories, Russia and Kosovo.

Since November 2010, Kiley has worked for Sky News, first as security editor, then defence and security editor in 2012, and in November 2012 he became Sky News's Middle East correspondent, based in Jerusalem.

On 14 August 2013, Kiley's cameraman Mick Deane was shot and killed while filming in Cairo. Kiley was working with him, reporting on the disturbances in the Middle East at the time.

== Publications ==
In 2009, Kiley wrote the book Desperate Glory: At War in Helmand with Britain's 16 Air Assault Brigade, based on his experiences as the only journalist to ever cover a full operational tour in Afghanistan, when he joined 16 Air Assault Brigade on its 2008 six-month deployment to Helmand.

He has contributed essays to anthologies of writing among them: Eating Mud Crabs in Kandahar, Simple Pleasures, Oxford Originals and is co-author of Journey Through Jordan with Duncan Willets and Mohammed Amin.

== Family ==
Kiley is married to Melissa and has two children, Ella and Fynn.
