= Scoil Mhuire, Longford =

Meán Scoil Mhuire
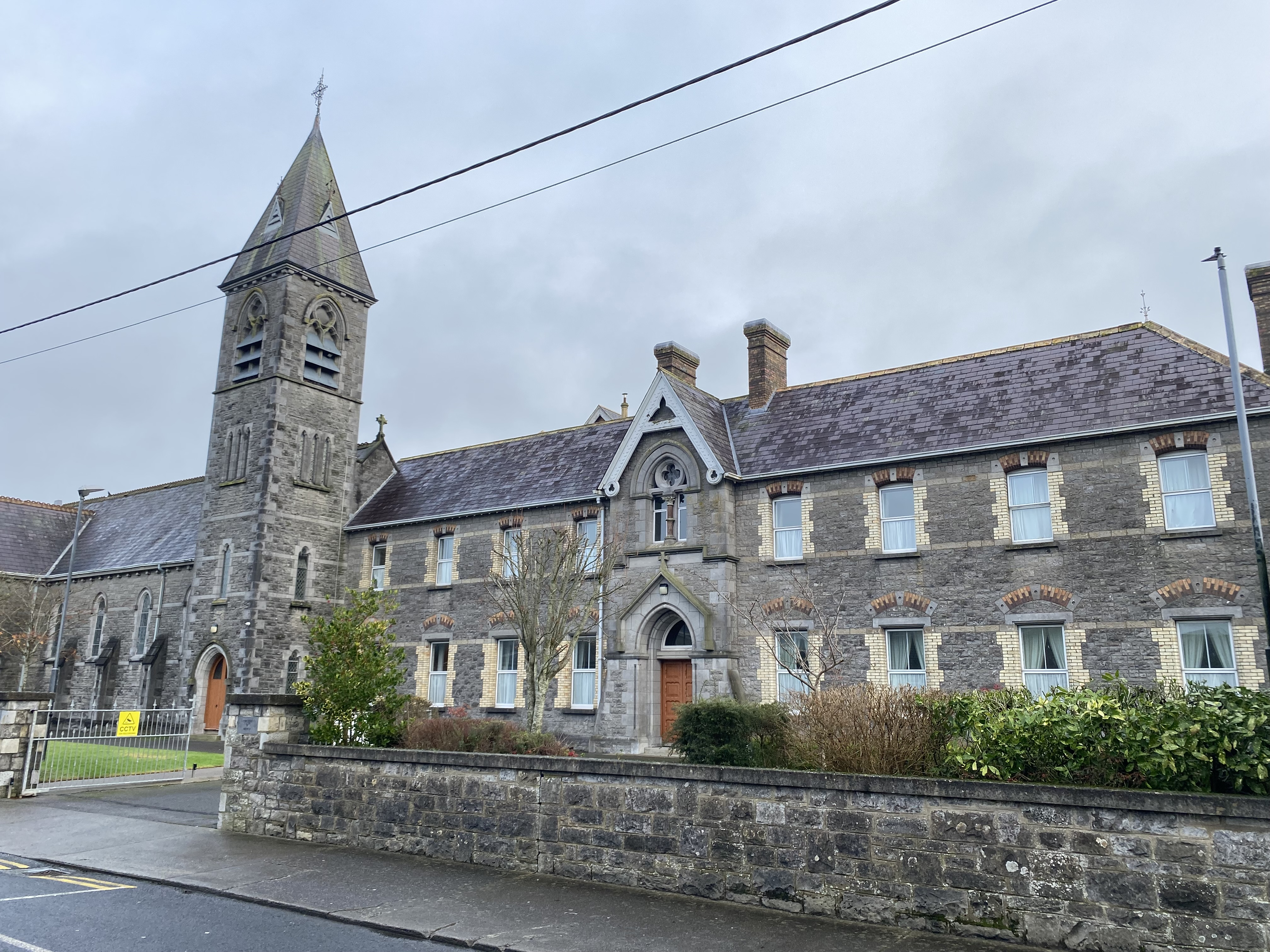
- Scoil Mhuire in 2024
- Longford, County Longford; N39H6R2; Ireland

Information
- Denomination: Catholic
- Established: 1874
- Trust: Catholic Education an Irish Schools Trust
- Principal: Aoife Mulrennan
- Gender: Female
- Enrollment: 530 (2019)
- Website: https://scoilmhuirelongford.ie/

Meán Scoil Mhuire (Our Lady's School) is an all-girls secondary school in Longford, Ireland.

== History ==
Meán Scoil Mhuire was founded by the Sisters of Mercy who came to Longford from Mother House in Baggot Street, Dublin in April 1861. They first lived in Keon's Terrace and taught young children in the ground floor room of the old St. Micheal's Boys’ School. Older girls who wanted to continue their education did so in the Senior Girls’ Academy at the back of St. Mel's Cathedral where the sisters taught them sewing, mathematics, religious education, English, book-keeping, cookery, French and music.

The new convent was completed in 1874, and the nuns moved from Keon's Terrace on 24 October. The secondary school, named "Our Lady’s School" was built in 1874, and by 1883 the pupils were sitting examinations. The boarding pupils lived in part of the convent. On Easter Sunday 1880, Bishop Woodlock laid the foundation stone of the primary school which opened to pupils in 1886. Around this time, a chapel was added to the convent. In 1915, German and Latin were added to the curriculum.

In 1935, a new building was erected. This consisted of three classrooms, separated by folding doors which doubled as a study hall in evenings, plus a science room and cookery kitchen. Around this time the school became an "A" school, i.e. all subjects were taught through Irish, and it changed its name from "Our Lady’s School" to "Meán Scoil Mhuire". It remained an all Irish school until the late 1960s.

In September 1957, the sisters purchased a bus which was used to transport pupils from North Longford. It was probably the first free transport system for students in Ireland.

In 1958, the primary school transferred to the new building which was built on the playing fields near the Dublin Road and the old primary school was renovated to accommodate ever increasing numbers in the secondary school.

The North East Wing was added to provide dormitories, a dining room and a kitchen. The boarding school could accommodate 120 and the school could hold approximately 300. The new boarding school opened in September 1960.

The introduction of free education at the end of the 1960s brought about an increase in the number of pupils continuing their education through secondary school, and Longford was no exception. The foundation of the present senior building was laid in 1975 on the site of the 1935 building, and this was opened by the Minister of Education in September 1977. The number of pupils continued to rise until all dormitories were converted into classrooms and the boarding school closed in 1986. A further two classroom extension was blessed and opened by Bishop C. O'Reilly on 9 April 1997.

== Alumni ==
- Shaunagh Connaire - broadcast journalist
