= James Brabazon =

British photographer and documentary filmmaker

James Martin Brabazon (born 18 February 1972), is a British documentary filmmaker, journalist, and author.

Brabazon is best known for his work in conflict situations. He first gained attention as the only journalist to film the LURD rebel group fighting to overthrow President Charles Taylor during the Second Liberian Civil War.

While in Liberia, Brabazon encountered South African mercenary Nick du Toit and hired him as his bodyguard. Brabazon’s memoir My Friend the Mercenary recounts his experiences of the Liberian civil war, his friendship with du Toit, and du Toit’s subsequent role in the failed Equatorial Guinea coup attempt.

In 2013 Brabazon produced the HBO documentary Which Way Is The Frontline From Here? The Life and Time of Tim Hetherington. The documentary tells the story of photographer Tim Hetherington, Brabazon's friend and collaborator, who was killed while reporting on the Libyan Civil War in April 2011. The documentary was shortlisted for the Academy Award for Best Documentary Feature.

== Early career ==
Brabazon studied for a master's degree in history at the University of Cambridge, graduating in 1994. He started his career as a photojournalist in London and Paris, before moving to Nairobi, Kenya to work as a television news producer with the Kenyan agency Camerapix.

== Liberian Civil War ==
In May 2002, Brabazon travelled to Liberia, then in the midst of civil war. He made contact with Liberians United for Reconciliation and Democracy (LURD), a largely-undocumented insurgent group fighting to overthrow President Charles Taylor.

Brabazon followed their march through the country towards the capital Monrovia, becoming the only journalist to film the group inside Liberia. In the course of his reporting, Brabazon recorded evidence of atrocities committed by LURD, including the torture and execution of government soldiers, and the murder of prisoners of war for ritual cannibalism. However, Brabazon has cautioned against "the stereotype of the bloodthirsty African rebel":

"The thing that most disturbed me is that those people, once you've removed the trappings of war, are just people like you and me…At the end of the day you look into the eyes of someone who's just executed a prisoner and what you're really seeing is yourself looking back."

Brabazon has stated that he was successfully treated for post-traumatic stress disorder on his return from Liberia.

In October 2002 and June 2003 Brabazon made two return trips to Liberia, the latter with photographer Tim Hetherington.

The events of the Liberian civil war formed the basis for Brabazon's documentaries Liberia: A Journey Without Maps (2002) and Liberia: An Uncivil War (2004).

== My Friend the Mercenary ==
In Liberia, Brabazon met Nick du Toit, a South African mercenary and arms dealer. Brabazon hired du Toit as his bodyguard and the two formed a close friendship, despite Brabazon’s unease with du Toit’s past as a veteran of the apartheid-era South African Army.

On being reunited in West Africa in 2003, du Toit informed Brabazon of his part in a plot to overthrow President Teodoro Obiang of Equatorial Guinea. Du Toit offered Brabazon the opportunity to film the coup attempt, and Brabazon agreed to document the operation. However, Brabazon did not receive word from du Toit confirming that the coup attempt was going ahead and did not board the plane, as he was mourning the loss of his grandfather in England and had turned off his phone.

The attempt to overthrow Obiang ended in disaster when Zimbabwean authorities discovered the plane being used to ferry men and equipment into Equatorial Guinea. The coup attempt gained international notoriety soon afterwards when it was claimed that Sir Mark Thatcher, son of former British Prime Minister Margaret Thatcher, was involved in funding the coup.

Nick du Toit was arrested in Equatorial Guinea along with 14 other men. Accused of leading this group, du Toit was eventually found guilty of treason and sentenced to 34 years in the infamous Black Beach prison. He was given a presidential pardon by President Obiang in 2009, having served five years and eight months in prison.

Du Toit has claimed that he was tortured, beaten and starved while in prison. Brabazon has spoken of feeling both guilt and relief on learning that he had narrowly missed du Toit’s fate.

Brabazon’s memoir My Friend the Mercenary tells the story of his friendship with du Toit and the events leading up to the coup attempt.

In March 2014, the NPR radio series Snap Judgment featured an extended interview with Brabazon, in which he reflected on his work in Liberia and his friendship with du Toit.

== Other work ==
In 2013, Brabazon produced the Academy Award-shortlisted documentary Which Way Is The Frontline From Here? The Life and Time of Tim Hetherington. Broadcast on HBO and the BBC’s Storyville, the film is a portrait of the photographer Tim Hetherington, Brabazon’s friend and collaborator. Hetherington was killed while reporting on the Libyan civil war in April 2011. Brabazon and Hetherington met in London in while Brabazon was preparing to film his documentary Liberia: An Uncivil War.

Brabazon has produced 21 films in Channel 4’s Unreported World series. Countries that he has visited for Unreported World include Somalia, India, Ivory Coast, Colombia, Angola, Cameroon, Papua New Guinea and Syria. He has also made six documentaries for Channel 4’s Dispatches series.

In addition to his work as a filmmaker and photographer, Brabazon’s written work has appeared in Newsweek, The Guardian Weekend magazine, Monocle and The Independent.

In 2006, Brabazon was called as an expert witness during the trial for war crimes of Guus Kouwenhoven.

== Personal life ==
Brabazon lives in the United Kingdom.
