= Sahar Zand =

British Iranian journalist (born 1989)

- Born: 21 January 1989 (age 37); Tehran, Iran
- Occupation: Journalist
- Notable credit(s): BBC, Channel 4
- Website: www.saharzand.com

Sahar Zand (Persian: سحر‌زند, born 21 January 1989), is a British Iranian television and radio presenter, broadcast journalist and documentary maker. Zand has worked across the BBC, Channel 4 and other international broadcasters covering breaking news, hard-hitting stories, live events and in-depth investigations in some of the world's most hostile environments.

Her range of domestic and international stories include topics such as Iran Nuclear Deal, the #metoo movement in Bollywood, mental health in Afghanistan, the refugee crisis, climate change, domestic violence, police shootings in the US, war on fake news, fame through social media and Heart and Soul, The plight of Hindus in Bangladesh on 2024 Bangladesh anti-Hindu violence.

== Documentaries ==
Chosen as one of the best reports by BBC's reporters in 2016, Zand's report "The Moroccan warrior women beating men at their own games" showed how Berber women are taking on men and winning in the high-octane and dangerous game of Fantasia, where teams of riders charge together, firing their rifles in unison.

Zand created BBC documentary "Living with the dead", showing the extreme rituals around deaths on the island of Sulawesi in Indonesia, with corpses often kept in family homes for years.

In another FPA-shortlisted BBC documentary "Madness of War", Zand had access to Afghanistan's only secure psychiatric unit and its patients who included former Taliban and Mujahideen fighters, investigating how nearly forty years of various wars have affected the mental health of the country's people.

In 2018, Zand made the documentary "India: Bollywood #MeToo" for Channel 4's current affairs programme "Unreported World", investigating how the #metoo campaign has taken off in India's film industry, meeting leading actresses speaking out against assault, sexual harassment and rape."

== Personal life ==
Zand was born in Tehran, Iran, in 1989. While Zand was a child, her family fled Iran, followed by staying in refugee camps until she as a teenager settled in the UK.

While studying architecture at the University of Kent, she wrote for the university newspaper and learned to produce and direct films, which led to a career within documentary making and journalism. She currently lives in London.
