= Yousra Elbagir =

Sudanese-British journalist

- يسرا الباقر
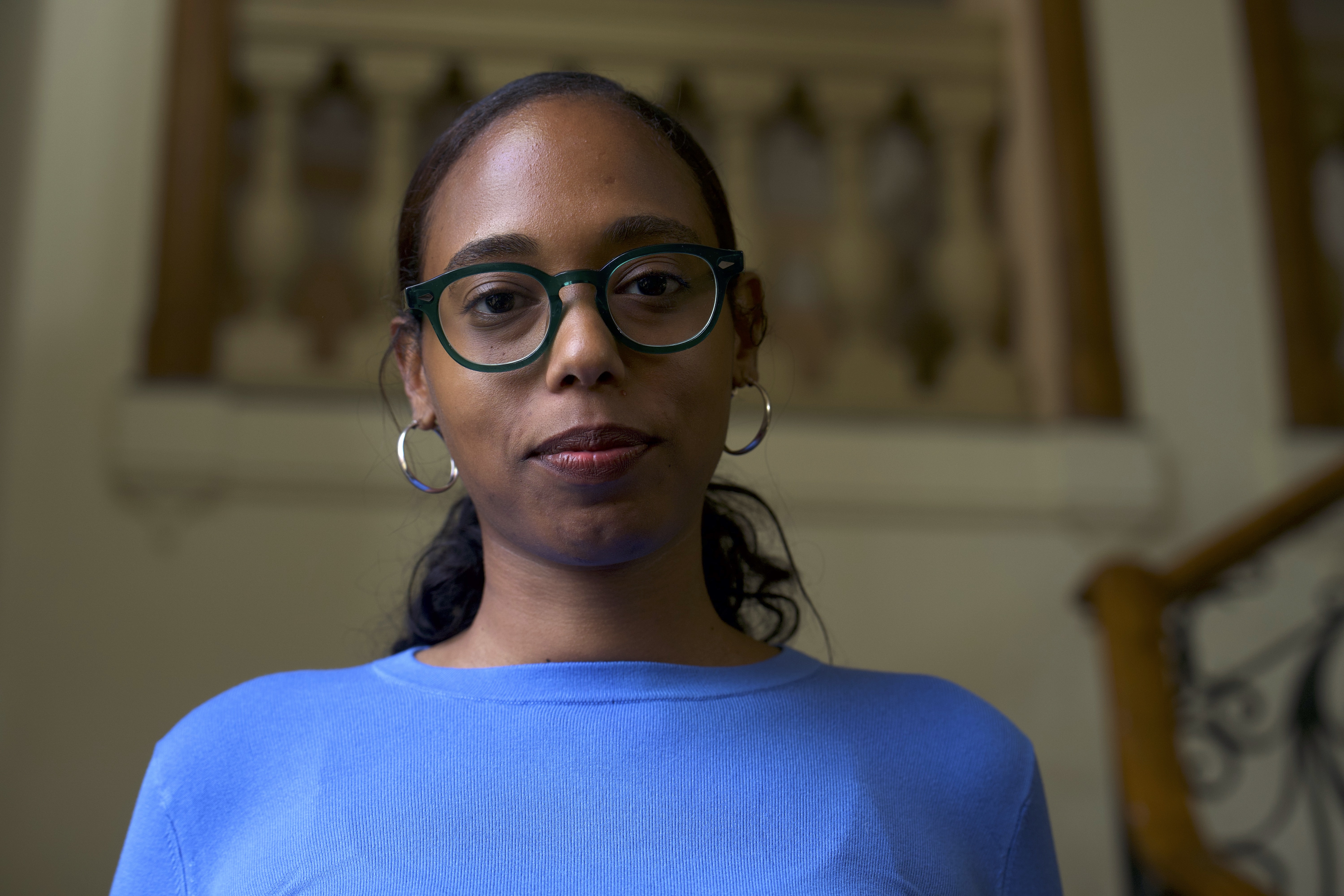
- Born: c. 1992
- Education: University of St Andrews, Columbia University Graduate School of Journalism
- Occupation: Journalist
- Awards: OkayAfrica 100 Women (2017)

Yousra Elbagir is a Sudanese–British TV journalist and writer. She is the Africa correspondent for UK news broadcaster Sky News.

== Early years and education ==
Elbagir was born in Khartoum to a Sudanese journalist and politician father, and to a publisher and business person mother. Her mother is known to be the first female publisher in Sudan. She grew up in the United Kingdom until she was 8 years old, when her family moved to Sudan. She moved back to London at the age of 16 and there, she acquired her A levels and graduated from the University of St Andrews with honours after studying Social Anthropology.

== Journalism ==
Elbagir started her journalistic experience by participating in student publications during her studies at St Andrews.

Elbagir returned to Sudan in 2015 after her studies to train as a journalist in the field. As of 2016, she was working as a freelance reporter in Khartoum and was a producer for Elephant Media. Her works have been featured on HBO, Channel 4, BBC Africa, BBC Radio 4, CNN, The Financial Times and The Guardian.

Elbagir started to become well known after launching the #SudanUnderSanctions online media campaign in which Sudanese women and men discussed the effects of the trade sanctions against Sudan.

In 2019, Elbagir reported on the Sudanese Revolution while working for Channel 4. She criticised the beginning steps of the Sudanese institutional transition to democracy, stating, "For the [first] tangible political progress of decades to exclude women is ridiculous. ... Women were the reason that the mass pro-democracy sit-in was able to continue for nearly two months. They ran make-shift clinics, fed fasting protesters daily during Ramadan, they spent the night at check points searching female protesters."

In 2022, Elbagir joined Sky News as its Africa correspondent.

== Personal life ==
Elbagir is the younger sister of the award-winning CNN journalist and TV correspondent Nima Elbagir.

== Awards ==
- In 2016, Elbagir was awarded the 2016 Thomson Foundation & Foreign Press Association Young Journalist Award for her in-depth reporting on the effects of United States sanctions against Sudan.
- In 2017, she was included in OkayAfrica's 100 Women list.
- In 2025, Yousra won the International Women in Media Foundation Courage in Journalism award for her work in dangerous conflict zones across Africa.
- In 2026, she was named Network Television Journalist of the Year at the Royal Television Society awards for her work as Africa correspondent for Sky News, most notably for her ground-breaking coverage of the war in her home country Sudan.
