= Shaunagh Connaire =

Irish broadcast journalist

Shaunagh Connaire is an Emmy-nominated Irish broadcast journalist, who has worked for the BBC, Channel 4 and CNBC amongst others.

== Early life ==
Connaire was raised in Longford and attended Meán Scoil Mhuire, an all-girls school in the town. In May 2018, she cancelled an invitation she had received to speak to the schools graduating class because the school declined to show a five-minute showreel she had put together for the occasion.

She graduated from UCD in 2006 and received an MA in journalism from Goldsmiths College in London in 2008.

== Professional life ==
She began her professional life working as a real accountant with KPMG in Dublin. After graduation from Goldsmiths, Connaire went to work for the BBC as a researcher and producer, working on BBC HARDtalk and BBC World News.

This was followed by production and reporting roles at CNBC and PBS Frontline, before she moved to Channel 4, where we worked on over 30 Unreported World episodes as the associate producer. In her first film on screen for Unreported World, she reported from Sierra Leone on the Ebola epidemic.

== Awards ==
In 2009, Connaire was shortlisted as 'Student Broadcast Journalist of the Year' by the Guardian and Sky News, just one year after leaving her career as an accountant with KPMG.

Connaire received the 2021 Gerald Loeb Award for Video for her contributions to the Frontline documentary "Opioids, Inc.".
