= Aidan Hartley =

Kenyan/British writer and entrepreneur (born 1965)

- Born: 1965 (age 60–61)
- Education: Balliol College, Oxford; SOAS University of London
- Occupations: Writer and entrepreneur

Aidan Hartley (born 1965) is a Kenyan-British writer and entrepreneur.

== Early life ==
Born in Nairobi, Kenya, in 1965, he was educated at Sherborne and studied English Literature at Balliol College, Oxford, going on to the School of Oriental and African Studies (SOAS University of London) to study African politics and history.

== Career ==
As a foreign correspondent for Reuters news agency, Hartley covered Africa in the 1990s – wars in Somalia, famine in Ethiopia and genocide in Rwanda. He is the author of The Zanzibar Chest: A Memoir of Love and War, which was short-listed for the Samuel Johnson Prize. He made dozens of television documentaries, most of them for the Channel 4 Television award-winning current affairs series Unreported World and Dispatches.

In 2013, he retired from mainstream journalism to focus on private business affairs and book writing. Hartley owns a ranch in Laikipia County, Kenya called Palagalan Farm. The conservation property is home to African wildlife species such as lion and elephant and these co-exist peacefully alongside the farm's herd of Boran beef cattle. Hartley is on the executive of the Boran Cattle Breeders' Society of Kenya.

In 2020, while stranded by lockdown in London, he co-founded a successful Covid-testing company, Crown Laboratories Ltd. In 2021, he co-founded Lantern Comitas, a strategic communications advisory with corporate clients across Africa, Europe and the Americas. In April 2022, the company agreed a joint venture with Mexico-based Miranda Partners.

He writes the "Wild Life" column of The Spectator.

== Bibliography ==
- The Zanzibar chest : A Memoir of Love and War. Harper Collins. 2003.
- Wild life : Adventures on an African Farm. Heinemann. 2008.
