= Seyi Rhodes =

British television presenter and investigative journalist

- Born: May 4, 1979 (age 46); London
- Occupations: Television presenter and investigative journalist

Seyi Rhodes (born 4 May 1979) is a British television presenter and investigative journalist of Nigerian descent. He has worked for the BBC, Channel 4 Television, Five Television and Current TV. From 2008, he has been the in-vision presenter and reporter for Channel 4's Unreported World documentary series, produced by Quicksilver Media.

== Early life ==
Rhodes was born in London on 4 May 1979 and spent part of his childhood in Nigeria.

== Education ==
Rhodes was educated at Monkton Combe School, an independent school in the village of Monkton Combe near Bath in Somerset, South West England, between 1991 and 1996, boarding at Farm House. He says: "I have to say I have very fond memories of my time at the school.... During the time I spent there, I felt safe and secure, which for me was really important". After Monkton Combe School, Rhodes went to the University of the West of England in Bristol, where he studied Politics and Sociology.

== Life and career ==
After school and university, Rhodes joined the BBC as a researcher, and in 2001 joined Channel 4 to work on the Dispatches programme. He says: "I had always wanted to go into television journalism, right from the time I saw, as a small boy, Kate Adie reporting from Tiananmen Square in 1989." In 2003, he joined The Wright Stuff talk show on Channel Five Television, taking over as presenter of the "Man with the Mic" section from Matt Rudge, and becoming its second-longest-running presenter before leaving in 2005. Rhodes has presented BBC Two's Explore series and reported for ITN's More 4 News, as well as working behind the camera on documentaries for Channel 4 Television's series Dispatches, and both behind and in front of the camera on the long-running BBC One documentary series Panorama. He has also worked on domestic and international stories for Current TV, and since 2008 has been a regular presenter of Channel 4 Television's Unreported World documentary series.

Rhodes has returned to the region where he spent part of his childhood to produce documentaries for Channel 4 and Current TV, which include programmes about slavery in Senegal and religious and homophobic violence in Nigeria.

=== Documentary list (incomplete) ===
Unreported World (Channel 4 Television)

- "Gambia: Sex on the Beach" (2023)
- "Gangs and guns: stopping Chicago's revenge killings" (2019)
- "South Africa's Deadly Gold Rush" (2018)
- "North Korea's Reality Stars" (2017)
- "Haiti: The Prison from Hell" (2016)
- "Making Brazil Beautiful" (2013)
- "Congo: Magic, Gangs & Wrestlers" (2012)
- "Trinidad: Guns, Drugs and Secrets" (2011)
- "Nigeria's Millionaire Preachers" (2011)
- "Inside the Battle for Ivory Coast" (2011)
- "India's Leprosy Heroes" (2011)
- "Bolivia's Child Miners" (2010)
- "Senegal: School for Beggars" (2010)
- "Witches on Trial" (2010)
- "Guatemala: Riding with the Devil" (2009)
- "Sierra Leone: The Insanity of War" (2009)
- "Thailand: Lessons in Terror" (2008)

Explore (BBC Two)

- "Sex and Religion in Manila" (2009)
- "Manila to Mindanao: Bajau people of Palawan" (2009)

Panorama (BBC One)

- "Stop and Search Me" (2009)

== Awards ==
In 2009, Rhodes' Unreported World report "Sierra Leone: The Insanity of War" won a MIND Mental Health Media Award for best short documentary.
