= Agnieszka Piotrowska =

British film director of Polish origin

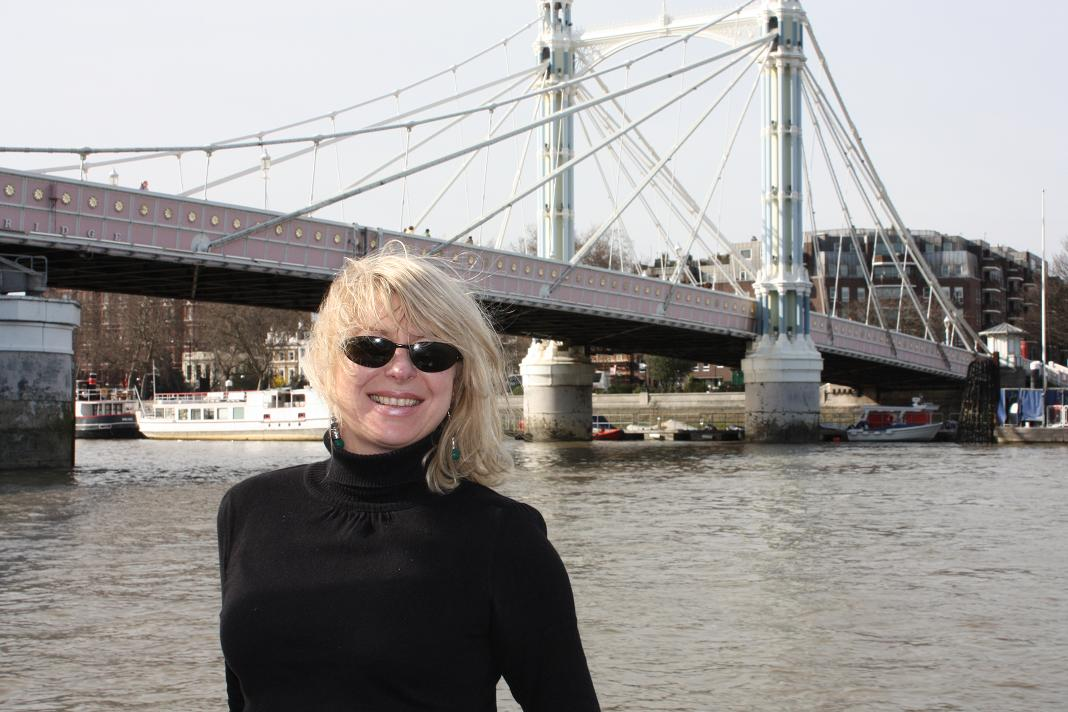
- Born: 1967 (age 58–59); Poland
- Education: Birkbeck, University of London
- Occupations: Author; filmmaker

Agnieszka Piotrowska (born 1967) is an author, international keynote and two times TEDx speaker academic and award-winning filmmaker, best known for her documentary Married to the Eiffel Tower (2008), about women who fall in love with objects." Her latest book AI Intimacy and Psychoanalysis (2026) was published by Routledge. The book has had much media interests as she introduces the notion of techno-transference in it. She is now a Visiting Academic with the University of Cambridge.

== Background ==
Piotrowska graduated from Birkbeck, University of London in 2012 with a PhD. Her PhD thesis was in Psychoanalysis and Technology and was the basis of her 2014 book Psychoanalysis and Ethics in Documentary now in second edition. In 2015 she edited "Embodied Encounters: New Approaches to Psychoanalysis and Cinema". She published two further monographs with Routledge: "Black and White: cinema, politics and the arts in Zimbabwe" (2017) and "The Nasty Woman and the neo femme fatale in contemporary cinema" (2019) and now the new book on AI Intimacy as above. She also writes essays, chapters and edits collections on psychoanalysis and culture

Piotrowska lives in London but has worked internationally. Apart from her academic writing, she has written extensivetly for non academic publications, including Times Higher (2025) and Free Associations (2025), most recently on human relationships with AI. In 2018 Piotrowska was shortlisted for the Times Higher Award in the category of Excellence and Innovation in the Arts for her creative work in Zimbabwe. Piotrowska was the Head of School of Film, Media and Performing Arts at the University for the Creative Arts from September 2020 to September 2022.

== Professional activity ==
In 1993, a series of 12 films were planned on the life and ideas of important philosophers, focusing in particular on the philosopher Ludwig Wittgenstein, produced by Tariq Ali on behalf of Channel Four. Only four scripts were commissioned, Socrates by Howard Brenton, Spinoza by Tariq Ali, Locke by David Edgar and Wittgenstein by Terry Eagleton. Spinoza was filmed and directed by Chris Spencer as Spinoza : The Apostle of Reason. Citizen Locke was directed by Piotrowska, 26, at the time. It starred Rufus Sewell and Saskia Reeves. The films were transmitted in the UK as 52 min long television films. Wittgenstein became a full film by Derek Jarman in 1993.

Piotrowska's 1995 BBC documentary Sex, Lies and Jerzy Kosinski, which she made soon after finishing her training, about the Polish-American writer who committed suicide in New York, included a rare interview with Roman Polanski. It was nominated for the Arts Documentary Emmy in 1995.

She directed two episodes of Channel 4's Cutting Edge, Love Hurts (1999), about domestic violence, and Trapped By My Twin (2007), about twin sisters who are constantly together. Both where highly praised and used in therapeutic practices.

Another Channel 4 documentary directed by Piotrowska, Poker Club, shown on Channel 4 in their Cutting Edge series, was critiqued by Victoria Coren in her Poker memoir For Richer, For Poorer: A Love Affair with Poker.

In 2001 Piotrowska did a series of "Self-Portraits" of photographers for the National Geographic Channel, including features on French war photographer Isabel Ellsen, Polish photo journalist Tomasz Tomaszewski and Indian fashion photographer Max Vadukul. Another photographer, David Alan Harvey was the subject of Piotrowska's 2002 film for National Geographic Channel's "True Originals" series.

In 2009 Piotrowska filmed a one-hour documentary about the Best Job in the World phenomenon, which was the highest-rated show of the week it was broadcast on BBC1. In July 2010 it was shown as part of Birkbeck College's Business Week.

Her film "Married to the Eiffel Tower" was highly accliamed at the time, and continues to be screened around the world at different events and conferences as well as on television. It features on-line in blogs and in 2015 was the basis for an MA thesis at the Central European University (Budapest).

=== Zimbabwe ===
Since November 2012 Piotrowska has embarked upon a series of creative projects in Zimbabwe as part of her ongoing research on post colonial trauma and creative collaborations across cultural, ethnic and gender divides in postcolonial systems. Her work was supported by a grant from the British Council and the Zimbabwean Theatre Association. In 2013 her film The Engagement Party in Harare premiered at the International Images Festival for Women in Zimbabwe and was nominated for Best Documentary Film.

In April 2014 she directed "Lovers in Time", a play by Zimbabwean writer Blessing Hungwe, at the Harare International Festival of the Arts. The play was controversial for its irreverent portrayal of two spirit mediums who are Zimbabwean national heroes. Piotrowska made an experimental documentary film out of the events which was completed in 2015. The film entitled "Lovers in Time or how we didn't get arrested in Harare" opened a discussion on freedom of speech and cultural sensitivity and screened internationally. It was praised for its originality and boldnes, and won international prizes.

In October 2014 she presented her short film Flora and Dambudzo, which featured Zimbabwe writer Dambudzo Marechera, at the Zimbabwe International Film Festival to considerable acclaim. This was the first time the iconic Zimbabwean writer's life was presented on film.

In 2016 Piotrowska co-directed a feature film called Escape, an African film noir. The film was previewed at the end of that year and was nominated for the best film at the Zimbabwe International Film Festival, and won awards for the best performances for the leading actor (Eddie Sandifolo) and for the leading actress Nothando Nobengula. It also won an award for its screenplay at the LA neo noir film festival. The film was screened internationally including at the most important festival in Poland, the Polish Film Festival in Gdynia in September 2018 where it was very well received. When Escape was selected for the 2017 Zanzibar International Film Festival its screening was banned at the last minute, allegedly for its erotic content, resulting in some media controversies.

In 2018 Piotrowska staged and adapted the play ″Finding Temeraire″ by Stanley Makuwe, an award-winning Zimbabwean playwright, resulting in the experimental film entitled Repented (2019) which explores how political history and external circumstances can profoundly impact an intimate personal relationship. The film has begun to preview at international events.
