= Balaknama =

Indian newspaper run by children

- Type: Monthly newspaper
- Format: Tabloid
- Founder(s): Chetna; Badhte Kadam
- Founded: September 2003; 22 years ago
- Language: Hindi, English
- Circulation: 8,000 (as of May 2023)
- Website: balaknama.org

Balaknama (Hindi: बालकनामा, romanized: Bālakanāmā, lit. 'The voice of the children') is an Indian newspaper which is run by children living in the slums of Delhi. It reports on issues such as sexual abuse, child labour and police brutality.

== History ==
Balaknama was launched in September 2003 by Childhood Enhancement through Training and Action (Chetna), an Indian charity, with the organisation Badhte Kadam (Hindi for "Stepping Forward") to report on the estimated 80,000 street children living in Delhi. It launched with just 35 reporters, and initially published as a quarterly newspaper.

In October 2013, Balaknama had only four pages, with plans to increase the page count to eight. The paper published a 10th anniversary edition in colour for the first time. That November, its story was made into a TV documentary titled "Slumkid Reporters". The documentary aired on Channel 4.

In November 2014, the paper published its first English edition. Its lead story on child beggars being forced to drag dead bodies garnered significant attention in Delhi. Its circulation was 4,000 in that year.

In 2015, the paper's circulation increased to 5,500. By that point, its page count had increased to eight.

By December 2015, the paper's network had expanded to seven cities across India, with over 10,000 children working for the paper. It was covering events in a wide range of cities, including Agra, Delhi, Gwalior, Jhansi, Mathura and Noida, and its readership was believed to be in the tens of thousands. The paper had 14 regular reporters in Delhi itself and many others in Uttar Pradesh, Madhya Pradesh, and Haryana, with illiterate children contributing by dictating their stories to other reporters. In the same month, India Today called Balaknama the "world's unique newspaper for and by street and working children".

In January 2016, the number of regular reporters fell to five due to a lack of funds for the paper. In response, it started relying on the concept of a batooni reporter, who narrates their stories for a writer to write down. In April, Balaknama's team consisted of about 60 reporters. By that point, it had shifted to publishing monthly editions.

In March 2022, it published its 100th edition. As of February 2023, the paper's circulation consists of over 5,000 Hindi and 3,000 English copies per month.

== Coverage ==
Balaknama reports on the lives of street children, exploring issues like sexual abuse, child labour and police brutality, and highlighting stories of hope and positive change. The paper has also campaigned to provide street children with identity cards for proof of residence.

In June 2015, the paper reported on a child marriage. In response, local activists held protests, forcing the police to intervene to prevent the marriage from taking place.

In November 2015, the paper's reporters conducted a survey of children living on Delhi's streets, finding that as many as 1,320 children were living on the streets. A reporter for the paper said, "We wanted to tell the police and the government that a proper count of street children was possible. If we can do it with limited resources, so can they when they have all the manpower and resources available to them."

In 2016, the paper reported that street children were being enlisted by police to remove dead bodies from railway tracks in Agra. Mainstream coverage of the report led to a public outcry, with the National Committee for Protection of Child Rights taking action against the police.

== Operation ==
Balaknama is completely staffed by children who live and work on the streets, and is edited by Chetna volunteers. The children receive training as reporters and editors. About 90 reporters gather and send news stories to four writers and editors, who then verify and write the stories. Editorial meetings are held every month.

Balaknama publishes in eight-page tabloid format. The copy is first written in Hindi and then translated to English. Funding is provided by Chetna, and through private donations and advertising.

In 2017, the children running the paper started publishing articles to over 5,000 readers using WhatsApp and email. In October 2022, the paper announced that it would be launching a YouTube channel in 2023.

== See also ==
- List of newspapers in India
