= Wael Dabbous =

British journalist

Wael Dabbous is a UK-based journalist and Emmy Award-winning director with a background in directing and producing highly impactful non-fiction content. He has worked on a number of documentaries, including:

- Frontline: Syria Undercover (2011) (Director): Together with Ramita Navai, Dabbous was awarded an Emmy for this film. Broadcast on PBS in the US, this documentary went undercover to show the reality of the uprising in Syria.
- Manhunt: Closing in on a British Paedophile (2013)(Director Producer): This documentary tells the story of the hunt for Simon Harris, a British paedophile who was living in Kenya. Harris was eventually convicted and sentenced to life in prison.

Dabbous has also been associated with a number of other documentary films broadcast on television, including documentaries on child prisoners in Burundi, broadcast on Channel 4 on free-to-air television in the UK

Dabbous attended Moulsham High School in Chelmsford, Essex, in England.

He has been a guest speaker at a number of events, including the Rory Peck Trust and UK / Europe Network Meeting of DART Centre.

== Documentaries ==
Year	Title	Role	Notes	Synopsis
2010	Ship Rescue The Devon Disaster		TV - Non Fiction - Production country: United Kingdom Production company: Steadfast Television	Documentary following the attempts of the rescue services to stop the MSC Napoli ship grounding on the coast off Devon.
2010	Oil Disaster: The Rig That Blew Up	Director	Production countries: USA - United Kingdom Production company: Pintsize Pictures	Documentary investigation into the first 36 hours of the Deepwater Horizon disaster, following the attempts of the salvage team to avert an environmental disaster. (NFA Catalogue) Documentary about the Deepwater Horizon disaster, where a BP oil well in the Gulf of Mexico exploded, causing a massive environmental disaster as damaged underwater pipes spewed oil into the ocean for weeks. Follows the attempts of teams to fix the leak and the impact of the incident.
2011	"Burundi: Boys Behind Bars"	Director/Producer	Shortlisted: One World Media Award (2012) Production country: United Kingdom Production company: Quicksilver Media Part of: Unreported World	Report by Ramita Navai on the children locked up in prison in Burundi, east Africa and the work of rights campaigner Pierre-Claver Mbonimpa. (NFA Catalogue)
2011	Undercover Syria	Director	Awards: News & Documentary Emmy Award (2012) Outstanding Coverage of a Breaking News Story in a News Magazine, Nomination: One World Media Award in the Television category (2012) Production country: United Kingdom Production company: Quicksilver Media Part of: Unreported World	Reporter Ramita Navai spends two weeks under cover with members of Syria's opposition movement, who are determined to overthrow President Assad's dictatorship.
2012	"Democratic Republic of Congo: Magic, Gangs & Wrestlers"	Producer	Production country: United Kingdom Production company: Quicksilver Media Part of: Unreported World	Documentary into the world of wrestling in the Democratic Republic in Congo.
2012	"Burma: The Village that Took on the Generals"	Director	Production country: United Kingdom Production company: Mentorn Barraclough Carey Part of: Unreported World	Report by Evan Williams on a Burmeses village resisting the influx of foreign investors
2013	"Saving Kenya's Street Kids"	Director	Production country: United Kingdom Production company: Quicksilver Media Part of: Unreported World	Aidan Hartley reports from his home town in Kenya on an extraordinary project to rescue the children who live on its streets. Together with director Wael Dabbous, Hartley highlights the inspiring work of the Restart Centre in Gilgil, which is providing a safe shelter for children at risk. The Restart Centre is run on a shoestring budget raised from private donations. Conditions are basic, but crucially, it represents safety for the 70 children who live there. Many of them ended up living rough as result of the bloody chaos that engulfed Kenya following disputed elections five years ago. More than 1000 people were killed, many families were broken up and thousands were made homeless. ©Channel Four Publicity
2013	"Afghanistan's Hunted Women"	Director	Production country: United Kingdom Production company: Quicksilver Media Part of: Unreported World	In the first episode of a new series of award-winning Unreported World, reporter Krishnan Guru-Murthy and director Wael Dabbous travel to Afghanistan, gaining rare access to the secret houses that shelter women hiding from violent husbands or from families who have tried to kill them for refusing to take part in arranged marriages. Improving women's rights was supposed to be one of the great legacies of Britain's involvement in Afghanistan, but Unreported World reveals that, as international forces start to pull out, powerful religious hardliners are trying to roll back new laws that protect women. ©Channel Four Publicity.
2013	"The Jungle Midwife"	Director	Production country: United Kingdom Production company: Quicksilver Media Part of: Unreported World	Report by Seyi Rhodes on the work of a midwife in the Central African Republic, where rebels have overthrown the government, allowing medical teams in to previously inaccessible areas.
2014	"Sierra Leone: Surviving Ebola"	Director	Production country: United Kingdom Production company: Quicksilver Media	Report on the Ebola outbreak in Sierra Leone
2014	Manhunt: Closing in on a British Paedophile	Director/Producer	Production country: United Kingdom Production company: Quicksilver Media	The story of how Simon Harris was brought to justice for paedophile crimes committed in Africa. Transmitted on the day of his conviction.
2020	Hacker:Hunter - Olympic Destroyer Pt1			
