= Krishnan Guru-Murthy =

British journalist (born 1970)

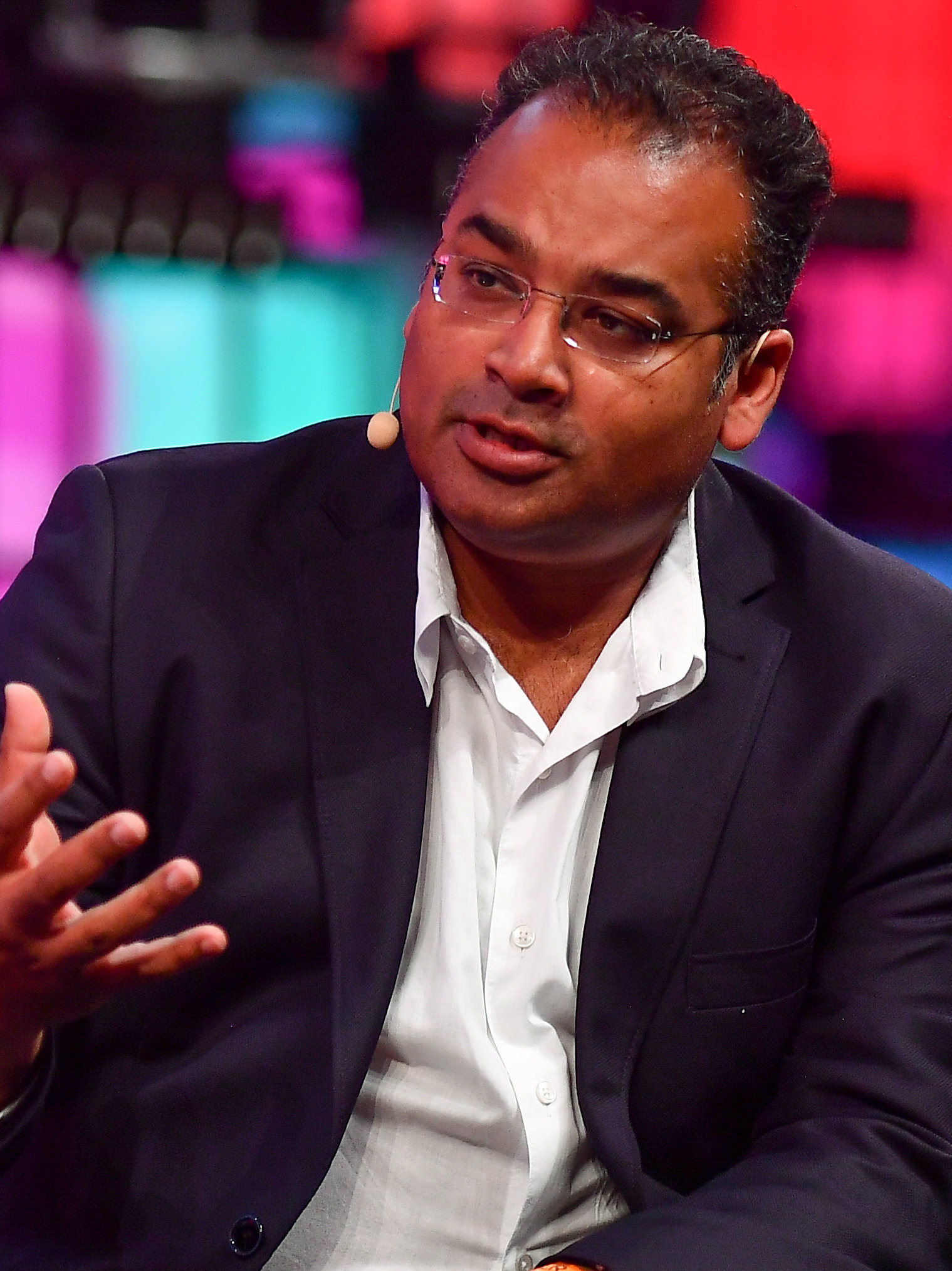
- Guru-Murthy in 2018
- Born: 5 April 1970 (age 56); Liverpool, England
- Education: Hertford College, Oxford
- Occupation: Journalist
- Years active: 1988–present
- Television: Channel 4 News; Unreported World
- Children: 2
- Relatives: Geeta Guru-Murthy (sister)

Krishnan Guru-Murthy (born 5 April 1970) is a British journalist and the lead presenter of Channel 4 News. He also presents Unreported World, a foreign-affairs documentary series.

== Early life ==
Guru-Murthy was born in Liverpool to Indian-Tamil parents. The family moved to a "gothic folly" in West Bradford, a village in Lancashire's Ribble Valley, where Guru-Murthy grew up. His father worked as a radiologist in Blackburn and Burnley.

Guru-Murthy attended the then-private Queen Elizabeth's Grammar School, Blackburn. He went on to graduate with a degree in philosophy, politics and economics from Hertford College, Oxford. He is one of three children in the family, with an older sister (the journalist Geeta Guru-Murthy), and a younger brother.

== Career ==
Guru-Murthy's career began in 1988 with the BBC's DEF II discussion programme Open to Question and the youth current-affairs programme Reportage. While at Oxford University he presented BBC2's Asian current-affairs programmes East and Network East. He presented and reported for children's news programme Newsround from 1991 to 1994. He worked as a producer and reporter for Newsnight for three years, and was one of the launch presenters for BBC News 24 in 1997.

=== Channel 4 ===
Guru-Murthy joined Channel 4 News in 1998 and is the programme's second-longest-serving presenter, behind Jon Snow. He was also the main presenter of Channel 4 News at Noon between 2003 and 2009. The Royal Television Society Journalism Awards nominated him for its News Presenter of the Year award in 2010 and 2014.

He has hosted Channel 4's coverage of ceremonies at the 2012 Paralympics, 2014 Winter Paralympics and the reburial of Richard III. He presented The TV Show and The Operation: Surgery Live. He has hosted The Event – How Racist are You?, The Autopsy, The Exorcism, the quiz show Number One and two series of Going Cold Turkey.

Guru-Murthy moderated Ask the Chancellors, the first debate between the Chancellor of the Exchequer and his counterparts in the 2010 General Election. He also hosted How to save £100 Billion – Live the night before the new government's Emergency Budget.

Guru-Murthy became Channel 4's ambassador for its foreign affairs programme Unreported World in 2011 and has made documentaries in Afghanistan, Cambodia, India, Iraq, South Africa, and Yemen.

On 19 October 2022, Guru-Murthy was suspended for a week by Channel 4 after calling Northern Ireland minister Steve Baker a "cunt" in an off-air remark. Guru-Murthy later apologised "unreservedly" to Baker. Channel 4 said it has a strict code of conduct for employees and "takes any breaches seriously."

==== Notable interviews ====
Guru-Murthy's February 2010 interview with Jim Devine became key evidence when the former Labour MP was prosecuted for expenses fraud. The politician was sentenced to sixteen months in jail.

In January 2013, Quentin Tarantino refused to answer Guru-Murthy's question if there was a link between film violence and real-life violence. The film director's responses included: "I'm not doing this, I'm not taking the bait"; "I refuse your question. I'm not your slave and you're not my master. You can't make me dance to your tune. I'm not a monkey"; "It's none of your damn business what I think about that!" and "I'm shutting your butt down."

Guru-Murthy described his October 2014 interview with Richard Ayoade as "the perfect joke interview." Ayoade's increasingly blunt responses had reduced Guru-Murthy's colleague Jon Snow to fits of laughter off-screen.

In April 2015, whilst promoting the film Avengers: Age of Ultron, Robert Downey Jr. walked out of an interview with Guru-Murthy after the journalist asked about the actor's relationship with his father, drug use, and alcoholism. The interview has been watched several million times on YouTube. Guru-Murthy said the question areas had been discussed in advance with Downey's public relations agent and Downey was in the wrong since Channel 4 does not do "promotional interviews."

=== Other news media ===
Guru-Murthy presented a weekly radio programme on LBC 97.3 between 2003 and 2005; hosted UK Leaders Live, interviewing the three main political party leaders in the UK's 2005 election; and presented the series Hindu Lives on BBC Radio 4 in 2005. He used to write a column in the Metro newspaper and the Asian newspaper Eastern Eye.

=== Other film and television ===
He has appeared on Gordon Ramsay's The F Word television show with his brother and mother as contestants.

In 2001, Guru-Murthy presented the short-lived Channel 4 game show Number One.

Guru-Murthy has appeared in a comic documentary about the band Gorillaz, as a guest on The News Quiz and Taskmaster, and in cameo appearances for Bremner, Bird and Fortune, Shaun of the Dead and Dead Set.

In August 2023, Guru-Murthy was announced as a contestant on the twenty-first series of Strictly Come Dancing. He was paired with professional dancer Lauren Oakley; they were the seventh couple to be eliminated.

== Volunteer work ==
Guru-Murthy is a trustee of Duchenne UK. He founded the Duchenne Dash, a 24-hour cycle ride from London to Paris, in 2013. He was also appointed to the board of trustees of the Royal Botanic Gardens, Kew in 2018, and was reappointed for the role in 2021.

== Personal life ==
Guru-Murthy is married and has two children. His sister is BBC News journalist Geeta Guru-Murthy. His brother Ravi Guru-Murthy was formerly Chief Innovation Officer of the International Rescue Committee and is currently Chief Executive of Nesta.

Guru-Murthy suffers from Crohn's disease and a genetic heart condition.
