= Hamida Ghafour =

Canadian journalist and author

Hamida Ghafour is a Canadian journalist and author of Afghan origin.

== Biography ==
Ghafour was born in Kabul in 1977 and is named after her grandmother who was a writer and social reformer. Ghafour and her parents fled Afghanistan in 1981, when she was four years old, due to the Soviet–Afghan War. In 1985 the family settled in Toronto. In 2003 she returned to Afghanistan as a journalist working for The Daily Telegraph, covering the reconstruction of Afghanistan. She has also worked for Unreported World on Channel 4. She lives in London since 2001.

== Bibliography ==
- The Sleeping Buddha (2007). London: Constable and Robinson / Toronto: McArthur & Company. ISBN 978-1-84529-313-0 (Hardcover); ISBN 978-1-55278-693-2 (Paperback).
