= Nima Elbagir =

Sudanese journalist (born 1978)

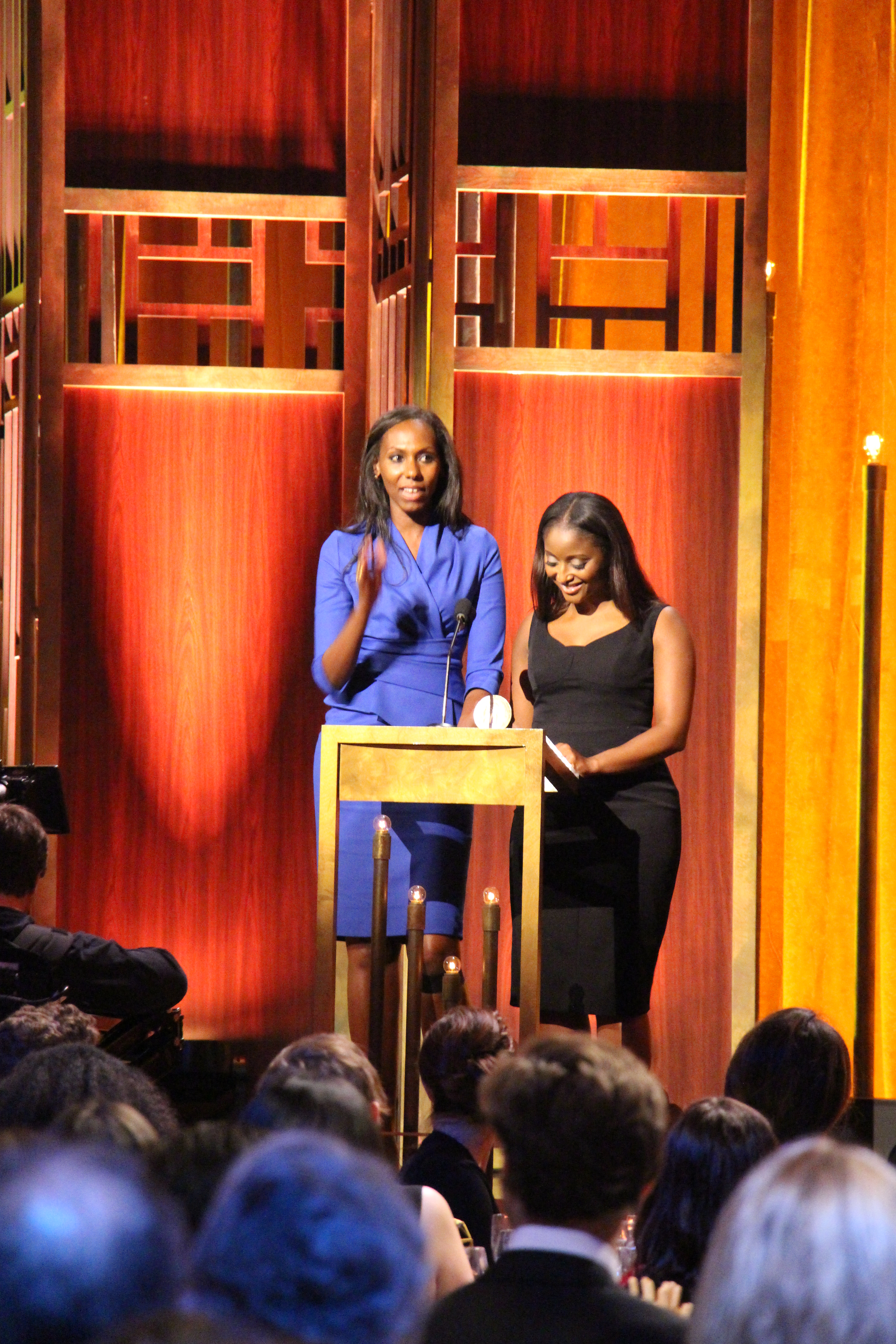
- Nima Elbagir (in blue) and Isha Sesay (in black) accept the Peabody Award, May 2015
- Born: 20 July 1978 (age 48); Khartoum, Sudan
- Education: The London School of Economics (BSc)

Nima Elbagir (Arabic: نعمة الباقر; born 20 July 1978) is a Sudanese journalist and international television correspondent.

== Early years ==
Nima Elbagir was born in Khartoum, Sudan, in 1978. Her father, Ahmed Abdullah Elbagir, was a journalist who was jailed before her birth, and her mother, Ibtisam Affan, was the first publisher in Sudan. Elbagir is of Sudanese origin. At the age of three, she moved to the United Kingdom, and when she was eight years old she moved to Sudan. After six years in Sudan, she returned to the United Kingdom.

Nima Elbagir was educated in Sudan and in Britain. She holds a BSc in Philosophy from the London School of Economics. She is fluent in Arabic and English.

== Career ==
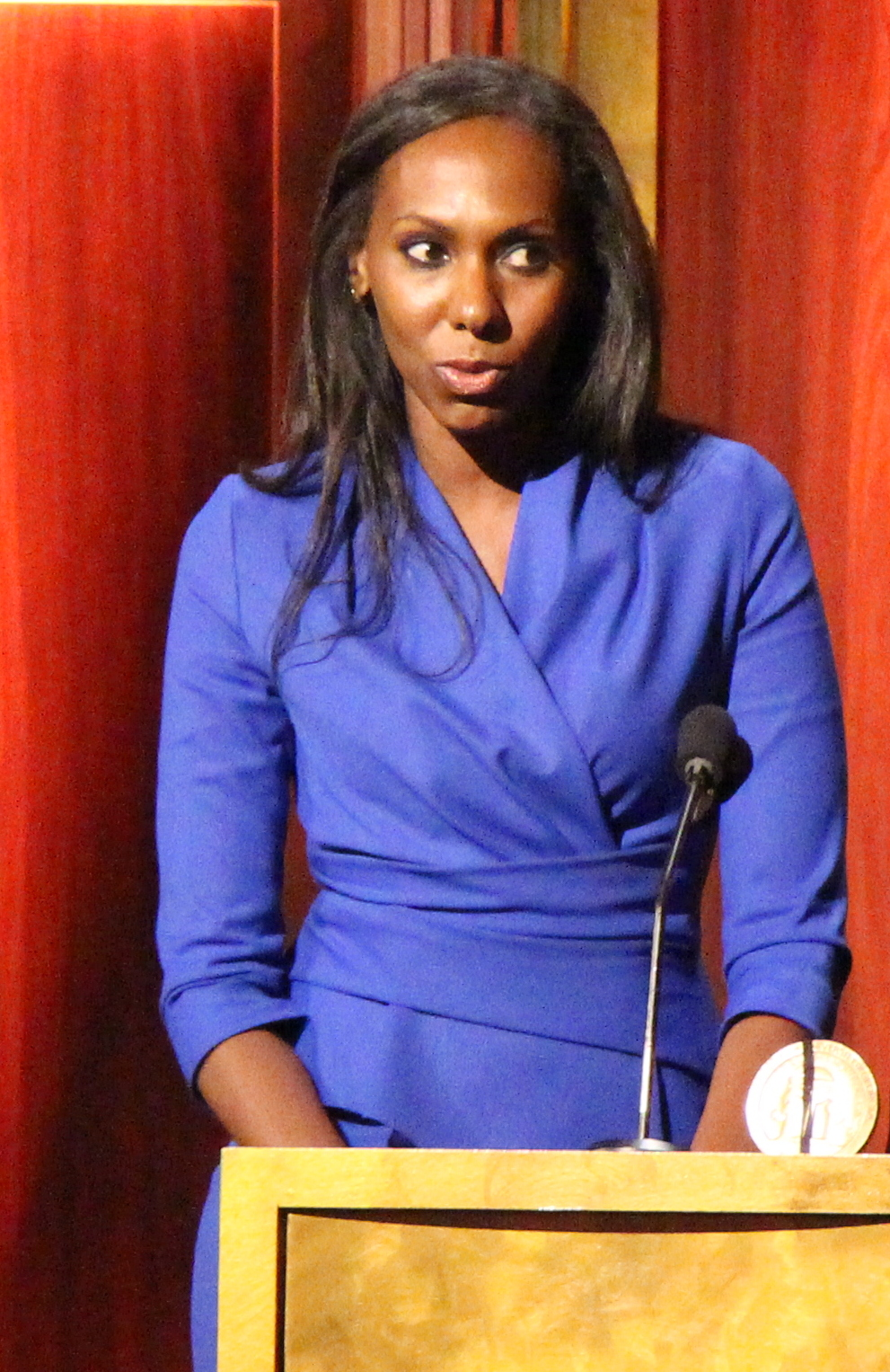
CNN Correspondent Nima Elbagir accepts the Peabody for CNN's coverage of the kidnapped Nigerian school girls. She is joined on stage by Isha Sesay.

Elbagir began her journalism career with Reuters in December 2002 reporting for them from Sudan, covering the simmering conflict in the country's Darfur region. She moved into broadcast journalism in 2005 joining the launch of More4 News, where her exclusives included exposing rape allegations against the African Union in Darfur, gaining the first interview with the Aegis security company whistleblower on the Iraq "Trophy Videos", interviewing Jacob Zuma in the run-up to his 2006 rape trial and reported from Mogadishu during the US bombing of Somalia in January 2007.

Elbagir joined CNN as a London-based international correspondent. In 2008, she picked up two Foreign Press Association Awards – TV News Story of the Year and Broadcast Journalist of the Year (winner of winners). She had been nominated for other awards including the Amnesty Award for Human Rights Journalism and the One World Broadcast Awards. In 2008, she was shortlisted for Young Journalist of the Year at the Royal Television Society Awards and in 2016, the society named her Specialist Journalist of the Year. Her work had taken her "to some of the darkest and most difficult places to report on in the past 12 months", said the citation, adding that Elbagir had "demonstrated great determination and bravery as well as deep humanity. She highlighted the plight of young people moving between continents and had the language skills to follow their journey in a way that no-one else could achieve". "Her fearless reports from Africa and the Middle East' meant that she was 'being compared to [CNN's] veteran Christiane Amanpour", wrote media commentator Maggie Brown on 27 February 2016's The Observer. On 27 January 2022 Elbagir was promoted to CNN's Chief International Investigative Correspondent.

In her first documentary with Unreported World "Meet the Janjaweed" she gained access to Mohamed Hamdan Dagalo, aka "Hemeti", one of the main Arab Janjaweed Commanders at the heart of the fighting in Darfur. Elbagir and her director Andrew Carter filmed the fighters' Sudanese Army ID cards and Chinese manufactured weaponry – broadcasting the first documentary evidence (Note: The BBC's Newsnight broadcast the first Janjaweed admission of Sudanese Government involvement – an interview with a defector on 17 October 2006 . The defector in that instance, though, did not offer Sudanese Army ID.)) of the Sudanese government's direct involvement with the Janjaweed and the role China's arms sales to Darfur are playing in the conflict.
