= Tanya Datta =

British radio and television journalist

- Occupations: Television presenter, journalist, broadcaster, writer
- Website: Official Website

Tanya Datta is a British radio and television journalist and writer. In 2000, Tanya joined the BBC where she spent seven years on BBC Radio 4's award-winning foreign affairs series, Crossing Continents. She has also reported for Channel Four, BBC2 and the World Service.

== Early life ==
Of Indian descent, Datta grew up in London. She graduated from Wadham College, Oxford in 1994 with a degree in English. In 1996, she won the Scott Trust Bursary to study journalism at City, University of London. She went on to be selected as an ITN News Trainee.

== TV career ==
Tanya made her TV debut in 2004, where she investigated claims of sexual abuse and murder against one of India's most powerful Godmen, Sai Baba in a programme for BBC2 entitled 'The Secret Swami'.

In 2009, she reported in the Explore series on BBC2 uncovering 'Argentina's Dirty War' where she had a detailed look into the lives of families torn apart by the Perón government's sponsored 'disappearances' of suspected communists.

== Radio career ==
Tanya worked for seven years on the award winning foreign affairs BBC Radio 4 strand Crossing Continents producing and presenting programmes from around the world. She also produced the documentary The Last Taboo looking into inter-racial relationships between the Asian and African-Caribbean communities which sparked a cross-media debate.

== Writing ==
Tanya has been writing a collection of short stories and is currently working on a novel.
