= Farai Sevenzo =

Zimbabwean filmmaker and journalist

- Born: Zimbabwe
- Occupations: Filmmaker, journalist

Farai Sevenzo /ˈfʌraɪ/ was born in Zimbabwe and is a filmmaker and journalist. He is from Kimetuki village in South Zimbabwe.
