= Eric McFarland =

American chemical and nuclear engineer and physician (born 1971)

Eric McFarland Ph.D.
- Education: University of California - Berkeley; Massachusetts Institute of Technology
- Known for: Hydrocarbon conversion Gas to liquids Catalysis research Sustainable energy technology Nuclear energy advocacy
- Awards: NSF Presidential Young Investigator Award (1990); ANS Special Award for Outstanding Advances in Nuclear Technology (1992); Dow Chemical Professor of Chemical Engineering at University of Queensland (2013)
- Scientific career
- Fields: Chemical engineering Sustainable energy Nuclear engineering
- Workplaces: University of California - Santa Barbara; University of Queensland
- Doctoral advisors: Martin J. Kushmerick

Eric McFarland (born October 13, 1971) is an American professor, chemical and nuclear engineer, and physician. He is known for his work in the field of sustainable energy, in particular his research on hydrogen production and his role at sustainable energy startups.

== Education ==
McFarland received a BSc in mechanical and nuclear engineering in 1980 and an MS in nuclear engineering in 1982 from UC Berkeley. He received a PhD in nuclear engineering from MIT in 1987, and an MD from Harvard University in 1988. His thesis at MIT was titled "Nuclear spin transfer studies of chemical reactions in living systems."

== Career ==
After completing his PhD, McFarland joined the nuclear engineering faculty at MIT, where he was awarded a three year Edgerton assistant professorship and researched the use of nuclear phenomena for non-destructive materials and chemical analysis. In 1991, he moved to UC Berkeley, where his research has focused on topics such as the study of catalytic and molecular reactions on complex surfaces.

In 2013, McFarland was appointed as the chair and inaugural director of the Dow Centre for Sustainable Engineering at the University of Queensland.

=== Private sector ===
In 1996, McFarland took a two year leave of absence to found Symyx Technologies, a company which provided software, tools, and techniques for combinatorial chemistry to the private sector. In 2016, part of the company merged with Dassault Systèmes. In 1999, McFarland founded Gas Reaction Technologies, a company which partnered with oil and gas companies to convert gas into liquid fuels. He went on to co-found C-Zero in 2018, a company which developed a technology for producing hydrogen by means of decarbonizing natural gas.

In 2025, NewHydrogen, a company developing a technology to produce hydrogen using heat rather than electricity, announced that McFarland would serve as their CTO.

=== Medical practice ===
McFarland also practiced medicine part time, receiving training in general surgery and working in emergency medicine until 2005. Since then he has practiced medicine on a voluntary basis.

== Views ==
McFarland is a proponent of nuclear technology, and has publicly advocated improving of nuclear regulatory framework.

== Honors ==
- 1980 University of California Regent's Fellowship
- 1981 National Institutes of Health Graduate Fellowship
- 1990 National Science Foundation Presidential Young Investigator Award
- 1992 Special Award for Outstanding Advances in Nuclear Technology from the American Nuclear Society
- 2013 University of Queensland Dow Chemical Professor of Chemical Engineering

== Patents ==
- US patent 6440745B1 "Combinatorial synthesis and screening of organometallic compounds and catalysts", issued August 28, 2002
- US patent 6833921B2 "Optical systems and methods for rapid screening of libraries of different materials", issued December 21, 2004
- US patent 8449849B2 "Continuous process for converting natural gas to liquid hydrocarbons", issued May 28, 2013
- US patent 20210061654A1 "Natural gas conversion to chemicals and power with molten salts", issued March 4, 2021
- US patent 11814285B2 "Simultaneous reaction and separation of chemicals", issued November 14, 2023
