= Clancy Chassay =

English writer, director, actor, and journalist

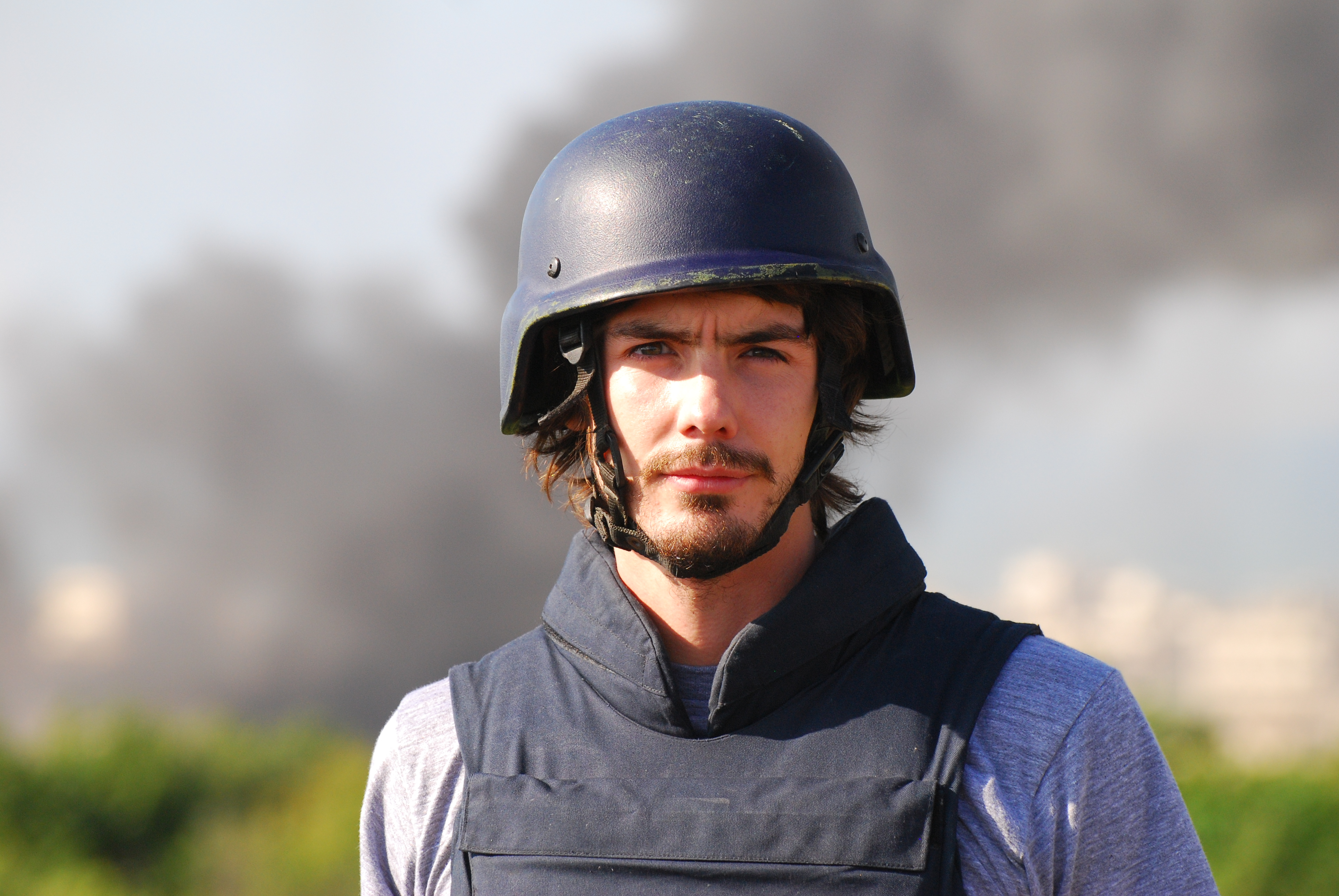
- Chassay in northern Lebanon in 2007
- Born: Clancy Charles Arcade Chassay; 1980 (age 45–46); Merton, Greater London, England
- Education: University of Sussex

Clancy Charles Arcade Chassay (born 1980) is an English writer, director, actor, and journalist. He has covered conflict zones across the world for various British news outlets, including The Guardian, The Economist, The Independent, The Sunday Telegraph, and the BBC. He has produced and directed documentaries for Channel 4 and Guardian Films in Afghanistan, Lebanon, Myanmar, Israel, the Palestinian Territories, the United States, and Chechnya. He now works as a director and screenwriter.

== Early life ==
Chassay was born in South London and grew up in artist David Hockney's former apartment in Notting Hill, West London. Hockney had sold his home to Chassay's designer parents and it became a hub for local and visiting artists, musicians and filmmakers.

As a child actor, Chassay appeared in two films by Derek Jarman opposite Laurence Olivier and Tilda Swinton as well as a string of commercials and music videos. In his late teens Chassay was recruited to develop television concepts for MTV and the UK's Channel 4, where he was the youngest member of Channel 4's Ideas Lab. Chassay attended Bedales School and went on to study philosophy and international relations at Sussex University, where he was a regular contributor to the Philosophy Society. During his university years, he was photographed by artist Tina Barney, Mario Testino, and modelled for Italian Vogue.

== War reporting ==
After university, Chassay moved to Lebanon to study Arabic and Middle Eastern studies at the American University of Beirut and work on the Lebanese English-language newspaper The Daily Star. He became a correspondent for The Guardian following the outbreak of the Lebanon war in July 2006, also working as Beirut correspondent for The Economist and The Sunday Telegraph.

He subsequently worked as a reporter and documentary filmmaker in Afghanistan, Israel, Gaza, Myanmar and Chechnya, investigating corruption, abuse, refugee crises, and the disproportionate use of force on civilian populations. He was nominated for the Rory Peck Award for Freelance Reporting and for Best Multimedia Journalist at the British Press Awards.

In 2008, Chassay was appeared on the Vice Creative 30 list.

== Writer and director ==
After several years working as a journalist in the Middle East, Chassay worked with director Rupert Sanders in Los Angeles on the development of advertising campaigns and film projects, among them Snow White and the Huntsman. His first screenplay was optioned by Lloyd Levin and Foundry Pictures. Soon after he was commissioned to write a sci-fi disaster movie for John Penotti and Green Street Films. He then developed a hi-tech spy series with Janet and Jerry Zucker, and a thriller project for Bernado Bertolucci. In 2015 he wrote and directed the short film The Foreigner, starring Michael Stahl David. Later that year, he was hired to write a Chinese mythological fantasy film for Road Pictures and then developed a racial revenge thriller, from a story written while working as a journalist, with director Nabil Elderkin. He is currently writing a thriller for director Shekhar Kapur, with Lloyd Levin producing.
