= Lightbox (production company) =

British film production company

- Industry: Entertainment
- Founded: 2014; 12 years ago
- Founder: Simon Chinn; Jonathan Chinn
- Headquarters: London, UK; Los Angeles, U.S.
- Products: Films; Television series
- Website: lightboxent.com

Lightbox is a British documentary film and television production company founded by Simon Chinn and Jonathan Chinn.

== History ==
Lightbox was founded by cousins Simon and Jonathan Chinn in 2014. It is headquartered in both London and Los Angeles. Originally a member of Channel 4's Indie Growth Fund, it bought back its shares and became fully independent in 2021. Later that year, it entered into a co-production partnership with Warner Music Group.

== Filmography ==
=== Feature films ===
| Year | Title | Director(s) | Ref. |
|---|---|---|---|
| 2017 | War Child | Jamie Roberts | |
| 2017 | LA 92 | Dan Lindsay and T. J. Martin | |
| 2018 | Whitney | Kevin Macdonald | |
| 2018 | Gypsy's Revenge | Jesse Vile | |
| 2019 | Untouchable | Ursula Macfarlane | |
| 2019 | Cajun Navy | James Newton | |
| 2019 | Tell Me Who I Am | Ed Perkins | |
| 2020 | Yusuf Hawkins: Storm Over Brooklyn | Muta'Ali Muhammand | |
| 2021 | Tina | Dan Lindsay and T. J. Martin | |
| 2021 | The Rescue | Elizabeth Chai Vasarhelyi and Jimmy Chin | |
| 2021 | Blood Brothers: Malcolm X & Muhammad Ali | Marcus A. Clarke | |
| 2021 | Torn | Max Lowe | |
| 2022 | The Princess | Ed Perkins | |
| 2023 | Donyale Luna: Supermodel | Nailah Jefferson | |
| 2023 | The Mission | Amanda McBaine and Jesse Moss | |
| 2023 | David Holmes: The Boy Who Lived | Dan Hartley | |
| 2024 | The Trouble with Mr Doodle | Jaimie D'Cruz and Ed Perkins | |
| 2025 | What They Found | Sam Mendes | |
| 2025 | Lost in the Jungle | Elizabeth Chai Vasarhelyi, Jimmy Chin, and Juan Camilo Cruz | |

=== Television series ===
| Year | Title | Network | Ref. |
|---|---|---|---|
| 2016 | The Traffickers | Fusion TV | |
| 2016 | Captive | Netflix | |
| 2018 | Food Exposed with Nelufar Hedayat | Fusion TV | |
| 2018 | Murder Mountain | Netflix | |
| 2021 | Hip Hop Uncovered | FX | |
| 2021 | Supervillain: The Making of Tekashi 6ix9ine | Showtime | |
| 2021 | Curse of the Chippendales | Discovery+ | |
| 2021 | Sophie: A Murder in West Cork | Netflix | |
| 2022 | Spector | Showtime | |
| 2023 | Bad Host: Hunting the Couchsurfing Predator | Sky Documentaries | |
| 2024 | Marilyn Manson: Unmasked | Channel 4 | |
| 2024 | Camden | Disney+ | |
| 2024 | Gunpowder Siege | Sky History | |
| 2025 | Hurricane Katrina: Race Against Time | National Geographic | |
| 2025 | The Diamond Heist | Netflix | |
| 2026 | The Pet Cemetery Murders: A Ghost Story | HBO | |
