= American Cinema Editors Awards 2018 =

68th ACE Eddie Awards
- Presented by: American Cinema Editors
- Date: January 26, 2018
- Site: The Beverly Hilton, Beverly Hills, California

Highlights
- Best Film: Drama: Dunkirk
- Best Film: Comedy: I, Tonya

The 68th American Cinema Editors Eddie Awards were presented on January 26, 2018 at the Beverly Hilton Hotel, honoring the best editors in films and television.

== Winners and nominees ==
Winners will be listed first, highlighted in boldface.

=== Film ===
Best Edited Feature Film – Dramatic:

- **Lee Smith – Dunkirk**
  - Joe Walker – Blade Runner 2049
  - Alan Baumgarten, Josh Schaeffer and Elliot Graham – Molly's Game
  - Michael Kahn and Sarah Broshar – The Post
  - Sidney Wolinsky – The Shape of Water

Best Edited Feature Film – Comedy or Musical:

- **Tatiana S. Riegel – I, Tonya**
  - Jonathan Amos and Paul Machliss – Baby Driver
  - Gregory Plotkin – Get Out
  - Nick Houy – Lady Bird
  - Jon Gregory – Three Billboards Outside Ebbing, Missouri

Best Edited Animated Feature Film:

- **Steve Bloom – Coco**
  - Claire Dodgson – Despicable Me 3
  - David Burrows, Matt Villa and John Venzon – The Lego Batman Movie

Best Edited Documentary Feature:

- **Joe Beshenkovsky, Will Znidaric and Brett Morgen – Jane**
  - Aaron I. Butler – Cries from Syria
  - Ann Collins – Joan Didion: The Center Will Not Hold
  - T. J. Martin, Scott Stevenson and Daniel Lindsay – LA 92

=== Television ===
Best Edited Comedy Series for Commercial Television:

- **John Peter Bernardo and Jamie Pedroza – Black-ish: "Lemons"**
  - Kabir Akhtar and Kyla Plewes – Crazy Ex-Girlfriend: "Josh's Ex-Girlfriend Wants Revenge"
  - Heather Capps, Ali Greer and Jordan Kim – Portlandia: "Amore"
  - Peter Beyt – Will & Grace: "Grandpa Jack"

Best Edited Comedy Series for Non-Commercial Television:

- **Jonathan Corn – Curb Your Enthusiasm: "The Shucker"**
  - Steven Rasch – Curb Your Enthusiasm: "Fatwa!"
  - William Turro – GLOW: "Pilot"
  - Roger Nygard and Gennady Fridman – Veep: "Chicklet"

Best Edited Drama Series for Commercial Television:

- **Andrew Seklir – Fargo: "Who Rules the Land of Denial?"**
  - Skip Macdonald – Better Call Saul: "Chicanery"
  - Kelley Dixon and Skip Macdonald – Better Call Saul: "Witness"
  - Henk Van Eeghen – Fargo: "Aporia"

Best Edited Drama Series for Non-Commercial Television:

- **Julian Clarke and Wendy Hallam Martin – The Handmaid's Tale: "Offred"**
  - David Berman – Big Little Lies: "You Get What You Need"
  - Tim Porter – Game of Thrones: "Beyond the Wall"
  - Kevin D. Ross – Stranger Things: "Chapter Nine: The Gate"

Best Edited Mini-Series or Motion Picture for Television:

- **James D. Wilcox – Genius: "Einstein: Chapter One"**
  - Adam Penn and Ken Ramos – Feud: Bette and Joan: "Pilot"
  - Ron Patane – The Wizard of Lies

Best Edited Documentary for Television:

- **Will Znidaric – Five Came Back: "The Price of Victory"**
  - Lasse Järvi and Doug Pray – The Defiant Ones: "Part 1"
  - Inbal Lessner – The Nineties: "Can We All Get Along?"
  - Ben Sozanski, Geeta Gandbhir and Andy Grieve – Rolling Stone: Stories from the Edge: "01"

Best Edited Non-Scripted Series:

- **Tim Clancy, Cameron Dennis, John Chimples and Denny Thomas – VICE News Tonight: "Charlottesville: Race & Terror"**
  - Rob Butler and Ben Bulatao – Deadliest Catch: "Lost at Sea"
  - Reggie Spangler, Ben Simoff, Kevin Hibbard and Vince Oresman – Leah Remini: Scientology and the Aftermath: "The Perfect Scientology Family"

=== ACE Golden Eddie Honoree ===
- Vince Gilligan

=== Career Achievement Honorees ===
- Mark Goldblatt
- Leon Ortiz-Gil
