= The Traffickers (2016 TV series) =

British-American television series

- Genre: Documentary; Journalism
- Presented by: Nelufar Hedayat
- Narrated by: Nelufar Hedayat
- Opening theme: Tandis Jenhudson
- Composer: Tandis Jenhudson
- Country of origin: United Kingdom
- Original language: English
- No. of series: 1
- No. of episodes: 8

Production
- Executive producers: Simon Chinn, Jonathan Chinn, Sam Collyns, Keith Summa, Daniel Eilemberg, Isaac Lee
- Production location: Global
- Running time: 60 minutes
- Production companies: Fusion; Lightbox

Original release
- Network: Fusion
- Release: 13 November 2016 – present

The Traffickers is a 2016 British-American eight-part investigative television series about the illegal trafficking of goods including precious minerals, fake pharmaceuticals, guns, endangered species, and humans. It is produced by Lightbox, the production company founded by Simon Chinn, who won Oscars for the feature documentaries Man On Wire (2008) and Searching For Sugar Man (2012), and Jonathan Chinn, an Emmy Award winner for American High. The Traffickers series, presented and narrated by Nelufar Hedayat, premiered on Fusion on 13 November 2016.

== Episodes ==
Episode number	Episode title	Directed and filmed by	Description
1	The Dark Side of Adoption	Ruhi Hamid	Nelufar Hedayat investigates how the West's desire to adopt internationally is driving demand for a supply of the world's poorest children.
2	Killed for a Horn	Nick Read	In the last 40 years, 95% of the world's rhino population has been lost. Nelufar Hedayat traces the bloody path of rhino horn trade from Vietnamese dealers to South African smugglers.
3	Organs for Sale	John Conroy	Nelufar Hedayat investigates the people who are forced by poverty to sell their organs
4	Guns and Gangs	James Brabazon	Gun trafficking in the gang wars of San Salvador that are traced back to North America
5	Bloody Gold	Andrew Carter	Gold miners forced to pay protection money to terrorists
6	The $3000 Meal	Alicia Arce	Pangolins are the most trafficked mammal in the world, yet few people have heard of them.
7	The Girl in the Window	Laura Warner	Nelufar Hedayat investigates the female refugees who are being trafficked in Bulgaria, Greece and Amsterdam
8	Fake Pharma	Lottie Gammon	Counterfeit pharmaceuticals have captured $200 billion on the black market

== Soundtrack ==
The opening theme and original music score was composed by Tandis Jenhudson.
