= Seattle Film Critics Society Award for Best Documentary Feature =

Award given by the Seattle Film Critics Society

The Seattle Film Critics Society Award for Best Documentary Feature is one of the annual awards given by the Seattle Film Critics Society.

== Winners and nominees ==
indicates the winners.

† indicates the winner of the Academy Award for Best Documentary Feature.

=== 2010s ===
Year	Film	Nominee(s)
2016
2016	O.J.: Made in America †	Ezra Edelman
2016	13th	Ava DuVernay
2016	Cameraperson	Kirsten Johnson
2016	Tickled	David Farrier and Dylan Reeve
2016	Weiner	Josh Kriegman and Elyse Steinberg
2017
2017	Faces Places	Agnès Varda and JR
2017	City of Ghosts	Matthew Heineman
2017	Ex Libris: The New York Public Library	Frederick Wiseman
2017	LA 92	Daniel Lindsay and T. J. Martin
2017	Step	Amanda Lipitz
2018
2018	Free Solo †	Elizabeth Chai Vasarhelyi and Jimmy Chin
2018	Minding the Gap	Bing Liu
2018	Shirkers	Sandi Tan
2018	Three Identical Strangers	Tim Wardle
2018	Won't You Be My Neighbor?	Morgan Neville
2019
2019	Apollo 11	Todd Douglas Miller
2019	American Factory †	Steven Bognar and Julia Reichert
2019	For Sama	Waad Al-Kateab and Edward Watts
2019	Fyre	Chris Smith
2019	Honeyland	Ljubomir Stefanov and Tamara Kotevska

=== 2020s ===
Year	Film	Nominee(s)
2020
2020	The History of the Seattle Mariners: Supercut Edition	Jon Bois
2020	Boys State	Amanda McBaine and Jesse Moss
2020	Collective	Alexander Nanau
2020	Dick Johnson Is Dead	Kirsten Johnson
2020	Time	Garrett Bradley
