= Tina Bell =

American singer and songwriter (1957–2012)

- Born: Tina Marie Bell; February 5, 1957; Seattle, Washington, U.S.
- Died: October 10, 2012 (aged 55); Las Vegas, Nevada, U.S.
- Spouse: Thomas McKay Martin (div. 1996)
- Children: T. J. Martin
- Musical career
- Genres: Grunge; punk rock
- Occupations: Singer; songwriter
- Instruments: Vocals
- Years active: 1983–1990
- Formerly of: Bam Bam
- Website: buttocksproductions.com/tina-bell

Tina Marie Bell (February 5, 1957 – c. October 10, 2012) was an American singer and songwriter, the front woman of the Seattle-based rock band Bam Bam. The band with Bell is considered one of the originators of the grunge music scene. Bell is considered an early grunge pioneer and was posthumously dubbed as "the Godmother of Grunge" and "Queen of Grunge".

== Early life ==
Tina Marie Bell was born in Seattle, Washington on February 5, 1957 and grew up there. She was the third of 10 siblings and the oldest daughter. Bell's biological father remains unknown; her mother refused to disclose his identity, only revealing that he was a race-car driver and mixed with Native-American. Bell got her start as a singer by singing at the Mount Zion Baptist Church in Seattle, and her first experience on stage was performing with the Langston Hughes Theater, also in Seattle. Bell was not religious and it created a rift between her and her mother.

Bell was a cheerleader in high school. She majored in drama at Washington State University.

== Music career ==
Bell and then-husband Tommy Martin formed a band called Bam Bam in 1983. The band also included bassist Scott Ledgerwood and drummer Matt Cameron–the latter went on to join Soundgarden and then Pearl Jam. Cameron was later replaced in Bam Bam by Tom Hendrickson. Bell's diminutive frame of 5'2" belied her low smoky voice that was called "unapologetic".

According to Seattle Times: "The legacy of Bell, a Black woman, has often been overlooked in a genre typically associated with long-haired white guys." These include Seattle breakout bands like Nirvana, Pearl Jam, Alice in Chains, Soundgarden, and others of that ilk. She was sometimes the victim of racial attacks while on stage, but the Bell-led Bam Bam was popular with local audiences. Future Nirvana founder/lead vocalist Kurt Cobain once served as a roadie for the band and was also a fan. The Melvins also opened for Bam Bam. Seattle's The Stranger wrote in 2012: "Bam Bam struggled, in part because audiences weren't on board with an African American female punk singer". Bell's ex-husband and bandmate Tommy Martin added; "The press compared her to Tina Turner, as if that made any sense.

Although Bam Bam were courted by punk rock label C/Z Records, they opted instead to independently release their EP Villains (Also Wear White) in September 1984. This was the first grunge record made at Reciprocal Recording studio, the location where later Nirvana made demos for the Bleach and Incesticide albums. Villains predated better known grunge recordings by about a year. "It wasn't for more than $100. The first band I recorded that released any kind of vinyl was an outfit called Bam Bam," Reciprocal Recording's owner Chris Hanzsek (the latter producer of albums by Soundgarden, Mudhoney, Melvins, and others in the Seattle music scene) told Billboard magazine. With songs written by Bell, Ledgerwood and Martin, and with Hendrickson on drums, Bam Bam recorded an album's worth of material at Reciprocal Recordings, including the material on the EP. Eight more of the tracks from the Reciprocal sessions were remastered and released in June 2019 as Free Fall From Space, produced by Martin and Hanzsek. An expanded version of Villains (Also Wear White) was released in late 2021 on Bric-a-Brac Records.

Bam Bam released the album Bam Bam House Demo '84 in January 2019, which included earlier home recordings of some of the songs recorded at Reciprocal Recording. The band also released a video of the song "Ground Zero," written by Bell, Martin, Ledgerwood and Cameron and taken from the Reciprocal sessions. The song contains lyrics written by Bell about the threat of nuclear war, inspired by living near the Naval Submarine Base Bangor, a home port for Trident nuclear submarines.

After the mid-1980s, both Ledgerwood and Hendrickson left the band, but Bell continued to front the band with a new rhythm section, along with Martin on guitar. In the late 80's and early 90's, Bam Bam toured with popular bands such as Pearl Jam, Soundgarden, and Alice in Chains.

After not receiving the local recognition of the other emerging "Seattle Sound" bands, Bell and the band left Seattle for London in the late 1980s, hoping for success in Europe. This did not garner the intended recognition and resulted in deportation back to America during an immigration enforcement dragnet in the Netherlands.

Bell left Bam Bam in 1990, and eventually quit music entirely. Bam Bam chose not to replace her, and instead continued as a 3-piece instrumental band.

A planned reunion of the original Bam Bam members was cut short in 2012 following Bell's death. Bam Bam bassist Scott Ledgerwood has stated in interviews that he and Bell had started to write new music together before her death, and that Bell was also planning on making a documentary film and a memoir with the working title Conversations with the Grunge Queen, which was going to be directed by her son, T.J. Martin, but those projects ended with her death.

== Influences ==
Bell was a fan of Frank Sinatra and Nina Simone in her youth. Martin turned Bell onto rock music and she became a fan of Jim Morrison, The Doors, Peter Gabriel, X, The Pretenders, and Metallica.

== Personal life ==
When Bell was looking for a French tutor so that she could sing French lyrics in a Langston Hughes Theater production, she met guitarist Tommy Martin. Bell eventually married Martin, and on September 7, 1979, the couple had a son, Thomas McKay Martin Jr, who later became a filmmaker known as T. J. Martin. In 2012, T.J. won the Academy Award for Best Documentary Feature Film for Undefeated (2011), becoming the first director of African-American descent to win an Academy Award for a feature-length film. T.J. stated about Bell: "Everybody remembers her as someone who would flash you a big smile, give you a big hug and genuinely want the best for you, and kind of hide her own demons. She always tried to show her best self when I was around and protect me from whatever kind of stuff she was battling inside. So an amazingly loving and warm person, [but] totally absent parent. My dad, a very present parent but the opposite. He vents. He brings you into his whirlwind of chaos." T. J. stated that his parents' relationship was "super-volatile"; "Probably not as gnarly as the quintessential Sid and Nancy, but it definitely shares DNA with the classic sex, cheating on each other, drugs, power dynamics in the band," he said. Bell and Martin eventually separated and Bell filed for divorce on April 12, 1996, and their son stayed with Martin following their divorce.

Bell had a long struggle with alcoholism and depression. After Bell quit music, she would write lyrics, study astral charts and rarely leave her house. After her son graduated from high school, Bell moved to Saint Paul, Minnesota where she lived for two years and volunteered at a local church. She then settled in the Las Vegas apartment where she lived until her final days. In 2006, her son moved to Los Angeles and saw Bell more regularly. Bell later saw her son winning an Oscar in 2012.

== Death ==
Bell died in her Las Vegas apartment of cirrhosis of the liver at age 55 on October 10, 2012. Her son, T.J. Martin, said the coroner estimated her time of death as a couple of weeks before her body was found. When Martin arrived at his mother's apartment in Las Vegas, all of her belongings – except for a DVD player, a poster, and a chair – had been thrown away. All of her writings such as lyrics, poems, diaries, along with Bam Bam music, videos, and other memorabilia went in the trash without her family even being notified.

== Legacy ==
Bell is considered an early grunge pioneer and is dubbed "the Godmother of Grunge" and "queen of Grunge".

Bell was often compared to singer Tina Turner. Bell's son, T. J. Martin, directed the documentary Tina (2021) about Turner. Martin recalled that his introduction to Turner began when he was a child and men on the street would hit on Bell by calling her "Tina Turner"; "not because they knew who she was but because she has a rock aesthetic. They would say, 'Hey Tina—Tina Turner!' That was the only other Black woman in rock they could associate her with", Martin said.

Bell and Bam Bam's legacy started being revisited in 2019 with the release of the demo Bam Bam House Demo '84 in January 2019, followed by the release of Free Fall From Space in June 2019, after bassist Scott Ledgerwood risked his life to save Bam Bam's master recordings from a house fire in 2017. Bell and the band's resurgence in the late 2010s and early 2020s also happened thanks to Ledgerwood, Bam Bam's main archivist who was often sharing stories and archives from the band. Interest in Bell and her music grew after CBS News aired a short documentary about her in September 2021.

Drummer Matt Cameron, Bell's bandmate in Bam Bam, said of her: "Tina was phenomenal. I've worked with like, some of the greatest singers of my generation for sure, and she's right up there, as far as just like charisma, power, and her lyrics are really fucking cool... She was one of the greats."

Seattle musician Om Johari, who used to go to Bam Bam shows as a teenager and said she was inspired to see a fellow Black woman singing in the Seattle hard-rock scene, which wasn't always inclusive of Black people or women, said that Bell does not receive the recognition she deserves as one of the founders of grunge because of sexism and racism. This is a sentiment shared by Bell's former bandmate, Bam Bam bassist Scott Ledgerwood, who said that Bell didn't get the record deals and fame that some of her white male counterparts achieved in the grunge scene because people in power in the music industry didn't give her the chance. "They were too blind to see that America was ready for a Black superstar, a gorgeous lady, up front in a hard [rock] band", he said.

In 2021, Bell's son, T.J. Martin, said he was planning on making a documentary about her.

In 2023, Bell was featured in the book Hit Girls: Women of Punk in the USA, 1975–1983, by Jen B. Larson.

=== Tribute ===
On July 9, 2021, Seattle musicians formed a tribute band and played a show at Central Saloon to honor Bell's legacy. Om Johari, singer for Bad Brains tribute band Re-Ignition, had the idea for the show after CBS News' Gayle King contacted her to do a story on Bell. The Bam Bam tribute band included musicians such as Matt Cameron, guitarist Kendall Jones of Fishbone, guitarist Ayron Jones, and bassist Jenelle Roccaforte. Pearl Jam guitarist Stone Gossard also participated, as did black women Johari selected who were influenced by Bell's music. This included Eva Walker of The Black Tones, Shaina Shepherd of BEARAXE, Dmitra Smith of Ex's With Benefits and Dejha Colantuono, songwriter. The band played a selection of Bam Bam songs at the show. CBS followed up on Bell's legacy, with a packaged story by Lee Cowan on the first broadcast of CBS Mornings.

On June 15, 2026, Lenny Kaye paid tribute to Bam Bam and Tina Bell on his weekly radio program on the SiriusXM Underground Garage channel with a three-song mini-set, along with a back story about the band and their place in the Seattle music scene.

== Discography ==
With Bam Bam

- Villains (Also Wear White) (1984) (EP)
- Free Fall From Space (2019) (EP)
- Villains (Also Wear White) (extended version) (2021) (EP)
