= Untouchable (2019 film) =

Documentary about sexual allegations of Harvey Weinstein

- Film poster
- Directed by: Ursula Macfarlane
- Produced by: Jonathan Chinn; Simon Chinn; Poppy Dixon
- Cinematography: Patrick Smith; Neil Harvey; Amza Moglan
- Edited by: Andy Worboys
- Music by: Anne Nikitin
- Production company: Lightbox
- Distributed by: Hulu
- Release dates: 25 January 2019 (Sundance); 2 September 2019 (Hulu)
- Running time: 98 minutes
- Country: United Kingdom
- Language: English

Untouchable is a 2019 British documentary psychological thriller film about film producer Harvey Weinstein and the sexual abuse allegations that involve him. It was directed by Ursula Macfarlane.

== Summary ==
The film focuses on interviews with Weinstein’s accusers, including Rosanna Arquette, Paz de la Huerta, and Erika Rosenbaum.

== Interviewees ==
The following is a list of people who were interviewed, listed alphabetically:

- Rosanna Arquette
- Ken Auletta
- A. J. Benza
- Mike Bodie
- Hope Exiner D'Amore
- Kathy Declesis
- Caitlin Dulany
- Abby Ex
- Ronan Farrow
- Mark Gill
- Louise Godbold
- Andrew Goldman
- Paz de la Huerta
- Jodi Kantor
- Nannette Klatt
- Jack Lechner
- Kim Masters
- Lauren O'Connor
- Mickey Osterreicher
- Zelda Perkins
- Erika Rosenbaum
- John Schmidt
- Rebecca Traister
- Megan Twohey

== Archive footage (uncredited) ==
In the film, actors and actresses that appear as themselves —and for whom archival material was used— were also credited. Appearances include Ben Affleck, Gillian Anderson, Asia Argento, Kate Beckinsale, Roberto Benigni, Juliette Binoche, Tom Cruise, Penelope Cruz, Uma Thurman, Nicole Kidman etc.

== Release ==
The film's festival debut at the 2019 Sundance Film Festival was followed by Hulu's acquisition of distribution rights, who released the film on 2 September 2019.

== Reception ==
On the review aggregator website Rotten Tomatoes, the film has an 87% approval rating, based on 53 reviews. The website's consensus reads, "While subsequent documentaries on the subject might be more comprehensive, Untouchable offers a gut-wrenching look at horrific abuses of power."

Writing for Entertainment Weekly, Leah Greenblatt called the film "[a] methodical, unmissable takedown."

Sharon Waxman of TheWrap wrote, "What director Ursula Macfarlane’s film does best is place the Weinstein scandal in context, revisiting the early years of Bob and Harvey, two brothers set on challenging the staid parameters of Hollywood filmmaking by making bold choices and supporting daring writer-directors."
