= Scutterfeld, Memphis =

Neighborhood in Memphis, Tennessee

Coordinates: 35.1712°N 90.0332°W

Scutterfield (real name Henry Oates Manor) was a community housing project on the northern edge of Memphis, Tennessee, which is a community that lies within the New Chicago area. It was one of the 11 communities comprising North Memphis. The project was torn down and the historical high school Manassas High School was built on the land in 2007. The 2011 documentary film Undefeated is about the Manassas High School's football team and its former coach Bill Courtney. Its football team has made 12 championship appearances and won twice. Scutterfield is home of hip hop artists Shank & Chrome, Koopsta Knicca and hip hop artist, DJ, radio personality & entrepreneur Damon West aka Ceo D.We$t..

== History ==
The projects was constructed around 1959 to be established as the neighborhood “Scutterfield” within New Chicago under the Memphis Housing Authority.
