= Captive (2016 TV series) =

2016 American docuseries on Netflix

- Genre: Documentary
- Directed by: David Belton; Sam Blair; Nick Green; Zara Hayes; Ursula Macfarlane; Nadav Schirman; David Sington; Jesse Vile
- No. of seasons: 1
- No. of episodes: 8

Production
- Executive producers: Simon Chinn; Jonathan Chinn; Doug Liman; Dave Bartis; Gene Klein; Lisa Nishimura; Adam Del Deo; Jason Spingam-Koff
- Producers: Alex Marengo; Kathryn Taylor
- Running time: 59–73 minutes
- Production companies: Netflix; Lightbox; Hypnotic

Original release
- Network: Netflix
- Release: December 9, 2016

Captive is an American documentary series that was released on Netflix on December 9, 2016. The series consisted of eight episodes, and explored hostage situations and negotiations around the world.

== Episodes ==
No.	Title	Length (minutes)	Captives	Original release date
1	"Prison Riot, U.S.A."	73:00	8	December 9, 2016
Lucasville Prison Riot
2	"Cola Kidnap, Brazil"	65:00	3	December 9, 2016
Corinne Coffin
3	"Taken at Sea, Somalia"	61:00	2	December 9, 2016
Paul and Rachel Chandler
4	"American Missionaries, Philippines"	61:00	20	December 9, 2016
Dos Palmas kidnappings
5	"British Aid Workers, Chechnya"	59:00	2	December 9, 2016
Jon James and Camilla Carr
6	"Bethleham Siege, Palestine"	59:00	39	December 9, 2016
Siege of the Church of the Nativity in Bethlehem
7	"Al Qaeda Hostages, Yemen"	62:00	3	December 9, 2016
2014 hostage rescue operations in Yemen
8	"The Peacemakers, Iraq"	62:00	4	December 9, 2016
Christian Peacemaker hostage crisis
