= Armen Keteyian =

American television journalist and author

Armen Keteyian (born March 6, 1953) is an American television journalist and author of 13 non-fiction books, including six New York Times bestsellers. Most recently he was the anchor and an executive producer for The Athletic. Previously he spent 12 years as a network television correspondent for CBS News where he also served as a contributing correspondent to 60 Minutes. Keteyian is an 11-time Emmy award winner.

== Early life and career ==
Keteyian was born in Detroit, Michigan, and is of Armenian descent. Keteyian is a 1971 graduate of Bloomfield Hills Lahser High School in Bloomfield Hills, MI, and graduated cum laude from San Diego State University with a BA degree in journalism in 1976.

Keteyian began his journalism career as a sports and feature writer in San Diego, freelancing for The San Diego Union-Tribune and San Diego Magazine (1980–1982) after spending two years at the Times-Advocate in Escondido (1978–1980). In June 1982 he was hired as a reporter for Sports Illustrated in New York (1982–1989), where he specialized in investigations. While there, he reported on subjects including corruption in college football and basketball, sports gambling in America, point-shaving scandals and the widening use of steroids in professional and amateur sports.

Keteyian was named a full-time correspondent for Showtime's 60 Minutes Sports, a monthly sports magazine show beginning in January 2013. The show completed a four-year run in March 2017 after more than 50 episodes. Prior to that he was CBS News' chief investigative correspondent for seven years (began March 2006), after spending nine years as a sportscaster for HBO and CBS Sports.

== NBC News ==
Prior to joining ABC, discussed below, Keteyian served as a reporter and producer for NBC Sports. He can be seen giving notable interviews at the 1988 Summer Olympic games in Seoul, notably following the Women's 4x100 Meter Freestyle Relay interviewing the American bronze medalists regarding their very competitive race against the gold medal East German (GDR) team, Holland silver.

== ABC News ==
He joined ABC News in New York City as a network correspondent in September 1989 and for eight years reported on hard-edged and issue-related sports stories for ABC's World News Tonight with Peter Jennings and other ABC News broadcasts. He has written or co-written 13 books, including New York Times best sellers, "Tiger Woods," "The System", an inside look at big-time college football and Why You Crying?, the autobiography of actor/comedian George Lopez; Money Players: Days and Nights Inside the New NBA, a critically acclaimed account of the rise of the NBA under Commissioner David Stern; and the New York Times best seller Raw Recruits.

Keteyian won a Women's Sports Foundation Journalism Award for a 1993 ABC News report on the landmark Title IX battle at Brown University. He also won 1993 and 1994 Emmy Awards in Sports Journalism and Overall Achievement for his reporting for ESPN’s Outside the Lines series.

== CBS Sports and CBS News ==
Keteyian joined CBS Sports as a special-features reporter in December 1997. Keteyian was a sideline reporter for the Network's coverage of the NCAA Men's Basketball Championship from 1998 to 2005 and annually contributed reports on key NCAA issues and features on teams and players during CBS Sports' Final Four broadcasts.

For the 2004 and the 2005 NFL seasons he served as the sideline reporter with the NFL broadcast team of Dick Enberg and Dan Dierdorf after spending six years as the lead sideline reporter with Greg Gumbel and Phil Simms. He also contributed reports for the NFL Pre-Game show The NFL Today and served as a reporter for the CBS Television Network's coverage of Super Bowl XXXV in January 2001 and Super Bowl XXXVIII February 2004. He served as a reporter for CBS's coverage of the 1998 FedEx Orange Bowl, the 1998 Winter Olympics in Nagano and has been the host and co-writer of the Tour de France (2001–2005). He was also the sideline reporter for the infamous Snow Bowl between the Patriots and Raiders on January 19, 2002.

Keteyian served as a contributor for the Super Bowl XLI in February 2007, and appeared on The NFL Today on Sunday December 23, 2007 with a one-on-one interview with New England Patriots Head Coach Bill Belichick.

Of Keteyian's 11 Emmys, three were for CBS News, including most recently (May 2011) "Photocopiers: Hidden Dangers" and (Sept 2010) "Rape in America: Justice Denied," a two-part investigation into the backlog of rape kits across the country. Four were for CBS Sports, including three for coverage of the Tour de France (2000–2004) and one for a Super Bowl pre-game piece about NFL quarterbacks and their sons (2005). He also has two Sports Journalism Emmys for Real Sports—a report on the financing of the Bank One Ballpark in Arizona (1998) and a story on high school basketball star Amare Stoudemire (2001).

According to Sharyl Attkisson in her book Stonewalled, CBS News became so hostile to any investigative reporting into the Obama administration that "She notes that [CBS News], which under previous hosts Dan Rather, Katie Couric and Bob Schieffer largely gave her free rein, became so hostile to real reporting that investigative journalist Armen Keteyian and his producer Keith Summa asked for their unit to be taken off the program’s budget (so they could pitch stories to other CBS News programs), then Summa left the network entirely."

== HBO Sports ==
He also was a featured correspondent for HBO Sports' Real Sports with Bryant Gumbel, from 1998 to 2006 and returned to the show from April 2010-December 2012. He has twice won Emmy Awards for RS in Sports Journalism (for a report on the financing of the Bank One Ballpark in Arizona (1998) and a story on high school basketball star Amare Stoudemire (2001). The topics on which he has reported over the years include point shaving on the North Carolina State University basketball team; the lack of black quarterbacks in the NFL; the killing of show horses for insurance profit; the premature deaths of many professional wrestlers; the rise of unscrupulous player agents in college sports; and the risks and realities of AIDS in sports.

Additionally, Keteyian co-produced and co-wrote "A City on Fire: The Story of the '68 Detroit Tigers," a 2002 documentary aired as part of HBO Sports' "Sports of the 20th Century" series. He was also the lead writer and executive producer of the Showtime documentary "Lawrence Phillips: Running for his Life," the story of the former Nebraska running back. He was also an executive producer of the HBO documentary "Tiger" based on his bestselling book on the superstar golfer.

== Personal life ==
Keteyian recently collaborated with legendary sports gambler William "Billy" Walters on an autobiography "Gambler" published in August 2023 that debuted at No. 2 on the NYT best-seller list. His next book, "The Price," co-written with John Talty, to be published by HarperCollins in August 2024, will explore the existing state of big-time college football focusing on the impact of NIL and the transfer portal. Keteyian and Dede, his wife of 43 years, live in Fairfield, Connecticut.
