= The Princess (2022 documentary film) =

2022 film by Ed Perkins

- Release poster
- Directed by: Ed Perkins
- Produced by: Simon Chinn; Jonathan Chinn
- Edited by: Jinx Godfrey; Daniel Lapira
- Music by: Martin Phipps
- Production company: Lightbox
- Release date: 19 January 2022; (Sundance Film Festival)
- Running time: 109 minutes
- Country: United Kingdom
- Language: English
- Box office: $101,188

The Princess is a 2022 British documentary film about Diana, Princess of Wales, directed by Ed Perkins. The film is produced by Lightbox in association with Sky and HBO Documentary Films.

== Summary ==
Told in the present tense, this documentary draws on recently revealed testimony and rarely seen archival footage to immerse viewers in the most iconic moments of the princess's life.

== Release ==
The film premiered at Sundance Film Festival on 19 January 2022, prior to its UK premiere at Sundance London on 11 June, and a UK nationwide theatrical release on 30 June. It premiered in the US on 13 August 2022, on both the HBO TV channel and the HBO Max streaming service, with its UK television premiere the following day on Sky Documentaries and Now. In Mexico it premiered on 1 September 2022. It premiered in Japan on 30 September 2022, with "Forever You" by Japanese artist Zard featured as the theme song.

== Reception ==
=== Box office ===
The film was released theatrically in a few territories including the United Kingdom, Australia, Finland, Norway and the Netherlands with a worldwide box office total of $101,188.

=== Critical response ===
On the review aggregator Rotten Tomatoes, the film holds an approval rating of 85% based on 88 reviews, with an average rating of 7.1. The website's critical consensus reads: "The Princess may not add anything truly new to its subject's story, but in recontextualizing the details of her public life, it forces the viewer to rethink them." On Metacritic the film has a weighted average score of 69 out of 100 based on 21 critics, indicating "generally favorable" reviews.
