= What They Found =

2025 documentary film by Sam Mendes

- Promotional poster
- Genre: Documentary film
- Directed by: Sam Mendes
- Composer: Hybrid
- Country of origin: United Kingdom

Production
- Executive producers: Pippa Harris; Caro Howell; Vicky Stanbury; David Baddiel
- Producers: Simon Chinn; Jonathan Chinn; Gaby Aung
- Editor: Andy Worboys
- Running time: 36 minutes
- Production companies: Lightbox; Neal Street Productions; Imperial War Museums

Original release
- Network: BBC Two
- Release: 7 April 2025

What They Found is a 2025 television documentary film directed by Sam Mendes in his documentary directorial debut. It features footage and first-hand accounts of the 1945 liberation of Bergen-Belsen. It was aired on BBC Two on 7 April 2025.

== Premise ==
In April 1945, Sergeants Mike Lewis and Bill Lawrie of the Army Film and Photographic Unit accompanied the 11th Armoured Division during the liberation of Bergen-Belsen concentration camp. The film features their footage and personal record of the events.

== Production ==
During the COVID-19 pandemic, director Sam Mendes was approached by producer Simon Chinn to direct a documentary about the Army Film and Photographic Unit. The film features footage shot by Sergeants Mike Lewis and Bill Lawrie at Bergen-Belsen, which had been preserved in the archives of the Imperial War Museum (IWM) in London since the 1950s. In addition, it utilizes excerpts from the interviews conducted by Kay Gladstone, former director of the IWM, with the men of the unit in the 1980s. The film was officially announced on 12 February 2025, with Mendes directing for BBC Two.

== Release ==
A trailer was released on 1 April 2025. The film was aired on BBC Two on 7 April 2025.

== Reception ==
Jack Seale of The Guardian gave the film four out of five stars, calling the footage "profoundly disturbing" and noting that it "could alter your whole world view".
