= The Pet Cemetery Murders: A Ghost Story =

2026 documentary series

- Genre: Documentary
- Written by: Philip Cairney
- Directed by: Philip Cairney
- Music by: Matthew Herbert
- Country of origin: United States
- Original language: English
- No. of episodes: 3

Production
- Executive producers: Simon Chinn; Jonathan Chinn; Suzanne Lavery; James Marsh; Silvia Sacco; Nancy Abraham; Lisa Heller; Tina Nguyen
- Producer: Joe John
- Cinematography: Tim Cragg
- Editor: Adam Finch
- Running time: 44-53 minutes
- Production companies: HBO Documentary Films; Lightbox

Original release
- Network: HBO
- Release: October 11 – October 25, 2026

The Pet Cemetery Murders: A Ghost Story is a 2026 documentary series directed and written by Philip Cairney. It explores the re-opening of a mysterious cold case surrounding the disappearance of Dorothy Lou Thompson, which unravels a haunting history of bloodshed and trauma.

It premiered on October 11, 2026, on HBO.

== Premise ==
Explores the re-opening of a mysterious cold case surrounding the disappearance of Dorothy Lou Thompson, which unravels a haunting history of bloodshed and trauma. It explains how Thompson was murdered by her employee, Brandon Nodier, who had attempted to fraudulently take her profitable pet cemetery from her; the murder occurred just days before the two were going to court on the issue. The series explores how, despite the motive, police were incapable of solving the crime until making an arrest 27 years later, then reviews how other police and prosecutorial failures meant that Nodier was able to plead to manslaughter in 2014 – nearly three decades after the murder – with a sentence of only 10 years in prison.

== Episodes ==
No.	Title >	Directed by	Original release date	U.S. viewers (millions)
1	"Episode One"	Philip Cairney	October 11, 2026	TBD
2	"Episode Two"	Philip Cairney	October 18, 2026	TBD
3	"Episode Three"	Philip Cairney	October 25, 2026	TBD

== Production ==
A co-production between HBO Documentary Films and Lightbox, Simon Chinn, Jonathan Chinn and James Marsh are among the executive producers.

== Reception ==
Brian Tallerico of RogerEbert.com gave the series three out of four stars, writing: "You don’t have to believe in ghosts to appreciate it." Noel Murray of The A.V. Club wrote: "Cairney does have a fascinating story to tell. And he has a sharp angle on it. Sometimes that’s enough".
