= TJ Martin =

American filmmaker (born 1979)

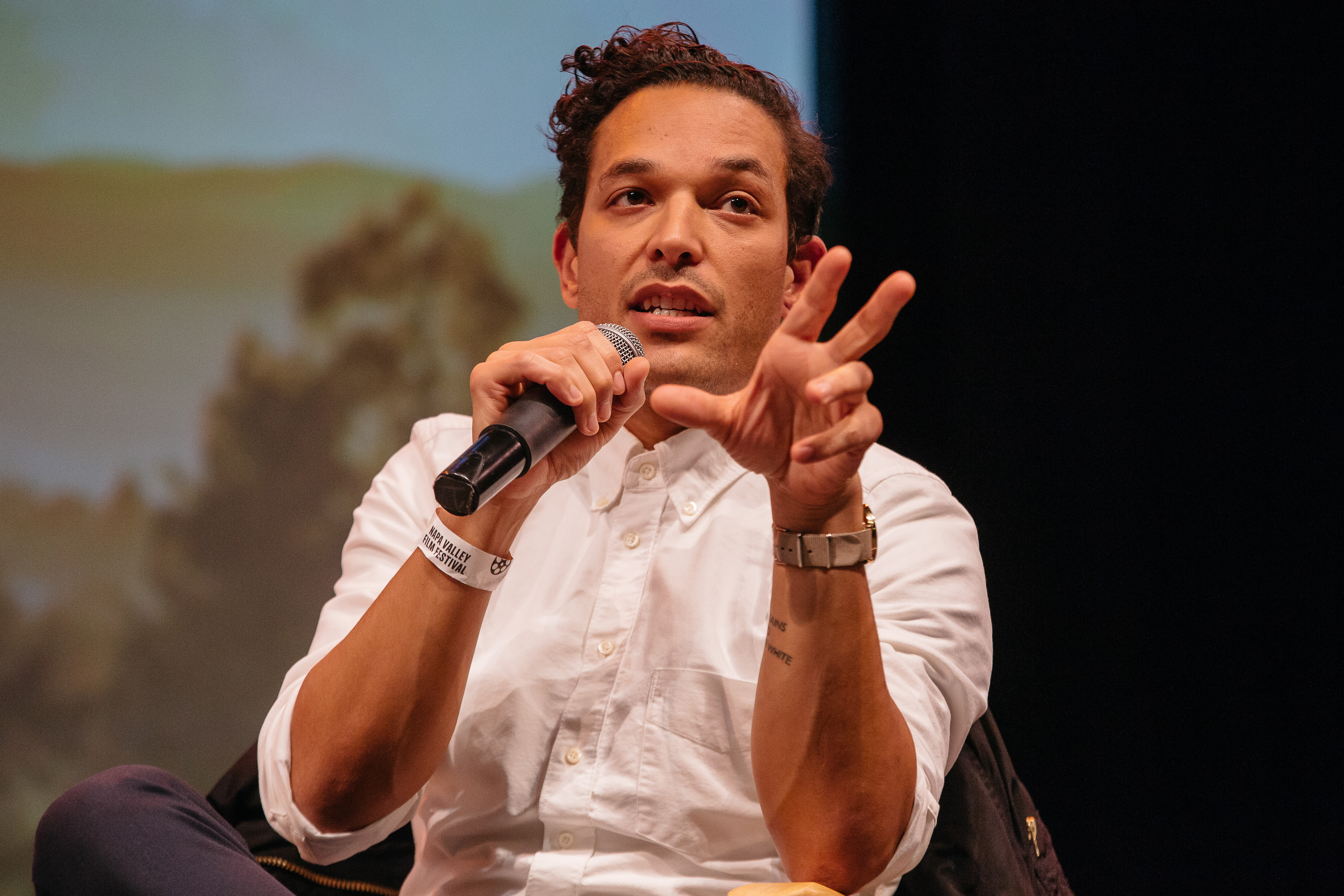
- Martin in 2017
- Born: Thomas McKay Martin Jr. September 7, 1979 (age 47); Seattle, Washington, U.S.
- Education: Fairhaven College; Western Washington University
- Occupations: Film director; screenwriter; film editor; cinematographer; producer; commercial director
- Years active: 2002–present
- Mother: Tina Bell
- Website: everyone-else.com https://tjmartin.co/

Thomas McKay Martin Jr. (born September 7, 1979), known professionally as TJ Martin, is an American filmmaker. Martin's film Undefeated (2011), for which he was co-director, co-editor, and co-cinematographer, won the 2012 Academy Award for Best Documentary Feature, making Martin the first film director of African-American descent to win an Academy Award for a feature-length film.

Martin's film LA 92 (2017), for which he was co-director and co-editor, won the 2017 Primetime Emmy Award for Exceptional Merit in Documentary Filmmaking.

Martin co-directed the documentary film Tina (2021) about the life of singer Tina Turner, for which he was nominated for a Primetime Emmy Award for Outstanding Directing for a Documentary/Nonfiction Program.

In 2023, he founded production company Everyone Else with filmmaking partner Dan Lindsay.

== Early life ==
Martin was born on September 7, 1979, in Seattle, Washington, to singer Tina Bell (1957–2012) and guitarist Tommy Martin (1958–2019), both members of the late punk/early grunge Seattle band Bam Bam. Martin's mother was African-American and his father was white. Martin is also of Native American, Scandinavian, Chinese and Jewish origin.

Martin graduated from Roosevelt High School in Seattle and went on to attend Fairhaven College at Western Washington University, where he studied American Cultural Studies, graduating in 2005. While there, Martin co-directed his first film, the feature documentary A Day in the Hype of America (2002), concerning the hysteria around the Y2K problem, which won Best Documentary at the 2002 Rhode Island International Film Festival. Martin then directed short films such as Loves Martha and On the Rocks, the latter is a docudrama about drug and alcohol addiction.

== Career ==
=== Feature films ===
In 2007, Martin met future directing partner Daniel Lindsay in Los Angeles, when they collaborated on the feature documentary Last Cup: Road to the World Series of Beer Pong, directed by Lindsay and edited by Martin. The film was distributed by Morgan Spurlock's company Warrior Poets.

As co-directors, Martin and Lindsay next made the feature documentary Undefeated, which chronicles the football team of Manassas High School in Memphis, Tennessee. The film focuses on the lives of several of the players and their coach, Bill Courtney, over the course of a single season. Undefeated premiered at the 2011 SXSW Film Festival and was purchased by The Weinstein Company for North American distribution just hours after the first screening. Released to near universal acclaim, the film went on to win the Academy Award for Best Feature Documentary in 2012. Undefeated holds a 96% rating on the review aggregator site Rotten Tomatoes.

In November 2012, Martin was listed on Ebony Magazine's "Power 100" list. That same year he received the award for “Outstanding Achievement in Directing” from the Seattle International Film Festival.

On April 28, 2015, Martin gave a talk at TEDx on Orcas Island, Washington, titled “Reimagining America's Culture Narrative”, in which he discussed race and diversity in the film and television industry and mass media more broadly.

In 2017, Martin and co-director/co-editor Lindsay, made the documentary feature LA 92. Composed entirely of archival footage, the film explores the days of civil unrest that followed the acquittal of four LAPD officers captured on video beating motorist Rodney King—the events commonly referred to as the 1992 Los Angeles riots. LA 92 premiered at the 2017 Tribeca Film Festival and made its broadcast premiere shortly thereafter on the National Geographic Channel. The film was named by several publications, including Rolling Stone and The Playlist, as one of the best documentaries of 2017. In June 2017, LA 92 won the Primetime Emmy Award for Exceptional Merit in Documentary Filmmaking. The film was shortlisted for Best Documentary Feature for the 90th Academy Awards and holds a 97% rating on the review aggregator site Rotten Tomatoes.

In 2021, Martin co-directed a documentary film for HBO about the life of Tina Turner, titled Tina. That same year, he signed a first look deal with Imagine Documentaries.

=== Television ===
In 2015, Martin co-directed a documentary special titled I Am Dying, which was produced by Joaquin Phoenix, Casey Affleck and Mary Lisio for the National Geographic Channel. The film chronicles Renee and Rita Heidtman as Renee loses her life to terminal breast cancer while her sister Rita cares for her.

In 2018, Martin co-directed Territorio de Zaguates, episode five of the TV series Dogs. The show is an episodic television show exploring the relationships between humans and dogs. The episode featured Territorio de Zaguates, a no-kill dog sanctuary in Costa Rica. The series premiered on Netflix in November 2018.

=== Other work ===
Working officially as the directing duo Martin + Lindsay, Martin and Lindsay have continued their work across various platforms including short films, television, and commercial work. Their short film My Favorite Picture of You (2013), was built around an audio interview with Martin's grandparents and was screened at numerous film festivals, was featured on The Atlantic and Vice, chosen as a Vimeo Staff Pick, and nominated for a Webby Award.

Martin and Lindsay have co-directed television commercials for clients that include Starbucks, Comcast, Gatorade, Facebook, Toyota, Prudential Financial, Hallmark Cards, the United Negro College Fund, Honey Maid, Google and the New York Times. The “This Is Wholesome” campaign, directed for Honey Maid, garnered both controversy and praise for its portrayal of parents and their children that include a single father, an interracial couple, and a gay couple.

In 2020, Martin and Lindsay's "The Truth is Worth It" campaign for The New York Times swept the commercial awards circuit and won a Clio award and two Grand Prix Lions for Best Film and Film Craft at Cannes Lions.

=== Production Company ===
Martin and Lindsay founded the production company Everyone Else in 2023 to foster projects across a range of styles, mediums, and platforms, with a focus on cinematic documentary film and television. The company's first production was the four-part documentary series Earnhardt about legendary NASCAR driver Dale Earnhardt, which debuted on Amazon Prime Video in May 2025.

== Filmography ==
=== Film ===
Year	Title	Credited as					Notes			
Year	Title	Director	Screenwriter	Producer	Editor	Cinematographer	Notes			
Year	Title	2002	A Day in the Hype of America	Yes	No	Yes	Notes	No	No	Documentary
Year	Title	2003	What Would Jesus Play?	No	No	No	Notes	Yes	No	Documentary, short film
Year	Title	2005	...Loves Martha	Yes	Yes	Yes	Notes	Yes	No	Short film
Year	Title	2005	On the Rocks	Yes	No	Yes	Notes	Yes	Yes	Documentary; also composer
Year	Title	2007	Larry Flynt: The Right to Be Left Alone	No	No	No	Notes	No	Yes	Documentary
Year	Title	2009	Last Cup: Road to the World Series of Beer Pong	No	Yes	No	Notes	Yes	No	Documentary
Year	Title	2011	Undefeated	Yes	No	No	Notes	Yes	Yes	Documentary
Year	Title	2013	My Favorite Picture of You	Yes	Yes	Yes	Notes	Yes	No	Documentary, short film
Year	Title	2017	LA 92	Yes	No	No	Notes	Yes	No	Documentary
Year	Title	2017	Copwatch	No	No	No	Notes	Yes	No	Documentary
2018	Where the Night Takes You	No	No	No	Yes	No	Documentary			
2021	Ferguson Rises	No	No	No	Yes	No	Documentary			

=== Television ===
Year	Title	Credited as					Notes			
Year	Title	Director	Screenwriter	Producer	Editor	Cinematographer	Notes			
Year	Title	2008	Get Your Face on with Napoleon Perdis	No	No	No	Notes	Yes	No	TV series, assistant editor
Year	Title	2015	I Am Dying	Yes	No	No	Notes	Yes	Yes	Documentary
Year	Title	2018	Dogs	Yes	No	No	Notes	No	No	Documentary series, episode "Territorio de Zaguates"
Year	Title	2020	Yusuf Hawkins: Storm Over Brooklyn	No	No	Yes	Notes	No	No	Documentary
Year	Title	2021	9/11: One Day in America	No	No	Yes	Notes	No	No	Documentary miniseries
Year	Title	2021	Tina	Yes	Yes	Yes	Notes	No	No	HBO Documentary

== Awards and nominations ==
Year	Work	Award	Result	Ref.
2002	A Day in the Hype of America	Rhode Island International Film Festival - Best Documentary	Won	
2011	Undefeated			
2011	Undefeated	SXSW Film Festival - Audience Award	Nominated	
2011	Undefeated	Southeastern Film Critics Association - Wyatt Award	Runner-up	
2011	Undefeated	Houston Film Critics Society Awards - Best Documentary Feature	Won	
2011	Undefeated	Philadelphia Film Festival - Audience Award	Won	
2011	Undefeated	Indie Memphis Film Festival - Audience Award	Won	
2011	Undefeated	Chicago International Film Festival - Audience Choice Award, Best Documentary Feature	Won	
2011	Undefeated	DOC NYC - Special Jury Award	Won	
2012	Undefeated	Broadcast Film Critics Association Award - Best Documentary Feature	Nominated	
2012	Undefeated	Black Reel Awards - Best Documentary	Nominated	
2012	Undefeated	Academy Award for Best Documentary Feature Film	Won	
2012	—N/a	Seattle International Film Festival - Outstanding Achievement in Directing	Won	
2013	Undefeated	Christopher Awards - Feature Films	Won	
2017	LA 92	International Documentary Association - Best Feature Documentary	Nominated	
2017	LA 92	Primetime Emmy Award for Exceptional Merit in Documentary Filmmaking	Won	
2017	LA 92	International Documentary Association - ABC New VideoSource Award	Won	
2017	LA 92	Seattle Film Critics Award - Best Documentary	Nominated	
2017	LA 92	Black Reel Awards for Television - Outstanding TV Documentary or Special	Nominated	
2018	LA 92	Awards Circuit Community Awards - Best Documentary Feature	Nominated	
2018	LA 92	Cinema Eye Honors Award - Outstanding Achievement in Editing	Nominated	
2018	LA 92	American Cinema Editors Award for Best Edited Documentary – Feature	Nominated	
2021	Tina	Primetime Emmy Award for Outstanding Directing for a Documentary/Nonfiction Program	Nominated	
2022	9/11: One Day in America	British Academy Television Award for Best Factual Series or Strand	Nominated	
