= Killer Ratings =

2019 crime documentary television series

- Genre: True crime; Documentaries
- Directed by: Daniel Bogado
- Opening theme: "Hienas na TV" by Elza Soares
- Countries of origin: Brazil; United Kingdom
- Original language: Portuguese
- No. of seasons: 1
- No. of episodes: 7

Production
- Executive producers: Dinah Lord; Eamonn Matthews
- Production companies: Caravan Media; Quicksilver Media

Original release
- Network: Netflix
- Release: 31 May 2019

Killer Ratings is a true crime television documentary series that was released on Netflix on May 31, 2019, about the Brazilian television presenter and politician Wallace Souza, who was accused of ordering a series of murders to improve the ratings of his popular television news program Canal Livre.

The series present stories and testimonies of professionals who worked on the program, authorities who acted in the case, Wallace's relatives and people who met the politician. The complex plot includes accusations of conspiracy, revelations about political disputes and how violence struck and reaches Manaus in several ways.

== Premise ==
Wallace Souza was the host of Canal Livre, a program that ran for 10 years in Manaus, Amazonas, on TV Rio Negro. The success of his program - which specialized in exposing and 'outing' murders, kidnapping, and anti-trafficking operations - made Wallace Souza very popular and led him to eventually be elected congressman in the Amazonas state. In 2009, police began to investigate Souza on charges of ordering murders to increase the audience ratings of his program.

== Production ==
=== Conception and development ===
The director Daniel Bogado mentioned that he first learned about the story of Wallace Souza when the case was reported in the international press, after a report of Fantástico, from TV Globo. It took more than two years between research and production, until the release of the docuseries.

=== Music ===
The original score of Killer Ratings was composed by Beto Villares. The series also features several songs from Brazilian musicians including "Hienas na TV", by Elza Soares, used in the opening.

== Episodes ==
No.	Title	Directed by	Written by	Original release date
1	"The Accusation"	Unknown	Unknown	May 31, 2019
2	"The Investigation"	Unknown	Unknown	May 31, 2019
3	"Conspiracy"	Unknown	Unknown	May 31, 2019
4	"The Son"	Unknown	Unknown	May 31, 2019
5	"In God's Hands"	Unknown	Unknown	May 31, 2019
6	"Judgement"	Unknown	Unknown	May 31, 2019
7	"The Terror"	Unknown	Unknown	May 31, 2019
