= Bill Courtney =

Bill Courtney may refer to:

- Bill Courtney (American football) (born 1968), American high school football coach
- Bill Courtney (basketball) (1970–2026), American college basketball coach
