= Band Amazonas =

TV Bandeirantes Amazonas

Manaus, Amazonas; Brazil
- Channels: Digital: 22 (UHF); Virtual: 13
- Branding: Band; Band Amazonas

Programming
- Affiliations: Rede Bandeirantes

Ownership
- Owner: Grupo Bandeirantes de Comunicação; (Rádio e Televisão Rio Negro Ltda.)
- Sister stations: Rádio Bandeirantes São Paulo; BandNews FM São Paulo; Band FM; Nativa FM

History
- First air date: March 13, 1991
- Former names: TV Rio Negro (1989-2009)
- Former channel numbers: Analog: 13 (VHF, 1989–2017)

Technical information
- Licensing authority: ANATEL
- ERP: 2.2 kW
- Transmitter coordinates: 3°5′58.6″S 59°59′46.9″W

Links
- Public license information: Profile
- Website: bandamazonas.com.br

Band Amazonas (channel 13) is Rede Bandeirantes-owned-and-operated station licensed to Manaus, capital of Amazonas.

== History ==
In the late 1980s, Rede Bandeirantes signed an agreement with former state governor Gilberto Mestrinho, to relay its network feed through a new station which would be owned by Francisco Garcia (who became Mestrinho's vice for the 1990 state elections). The station started as a Legal Amazon relay station (RTV) in 1987, one year after the network's affiliation with TV Amazonas ended, in favor of Globo. In 1989, it received the name TV Rio Negro, but it wasn't until March 13, 1991 when the station started broadcasting.

In the 2000s, it aired the controversial program Canal Livre, presented by Wallace Souza, which reached high ratings. However, its success was halted by the "Irmãos Wallace" scandal, leading to its cancellation in 2009. The preogram returned to local TV on TV Em Tempo, an SBT affiliate, as Programa Livre, airing from 2013 to 2016.

In August 2008, the station was acquired by Grupo Bandeirantes de Comunicação, being renamed Band Amazonas on March 26, 2009. That acquisition was part of Grupo Bandeirantes' strategy to protect Band's coverage in the state of Amazonas, in tesponse to the loss of SBT's coverage in the region a few years earlier.

Band Amazonas was responsible for launching the career of former BBB contestant and Miss Amazonas 2012, Vivian Amorim. She started her career as a journalist on "Programa do Nathan" in 2015. Currently, Vivian works at TV Globo, where she makes reports for Big Brother Brasil since 2018.

== Technical information ==
| Virtual channel | Digital channel | Screen | Content |
|---|---|---|---|
| 13.1 | 22 UHF | 1080i | Main Band Amazonas programming/Band |

The station shut down its analog sifnal on VHF channel 13 on May 30, 2018, according to the official ANATEL timeline.
