= Daniel Bogado =

British - Paraguayan documentary producer and director

- Daniel Bogado
- Born: Daniel Bogado; 1979 (age 46–47)
- Occupations: Documentary producer and director

Daniel Bogado (born 1979) is a British-Paraguayan documentary producer and director whose work spans current affairs, investigative journalism and historical documentary. He is best known for 9/11: One Day in America, Tsunami: Race Against Time and Killer Ratings. His work has won multiple awards, including two News & Documentary Emmy Awards for Outstanding Historical Documentary: 9/11: One Day in America and Tsunami: Race Against Time.

== Career ==
In 2012, Bogado won the Rory Peck Sony Impact Award for "Terror in Sudan", a documentary describing human rights abuses in Sudan by the Government of Omar al-Bashir. The documentary showed Bogado and reporter Aidan Hartley observing a series of Antonov military aircraft circling the area of the Nuba Mountains where filming took place. The film also received a nomination at the following year's Royal Television Society Independent Spirit Award.

In 2014, Bogado filmed "Nigeria's Hidden War" for Channel 4's Dispatches series, documenting violence against civilians by the Nigerian government as part of its struggle against the extremist group Boko Haram. The documentary was nominated for the Foreign Press Association Feature Award and later won the Broadcast Award for Best Current Affairs Programme. A US version of the documentary was made for PBS Frontline and won an Emmy Award for Best Investigative Journalism in a News Magazine.

In 2014, he produced and directed "15 and Learning to Speak", a story about a deaf teenager in Uganda who is taught sign language for the first time in his life. Bogado said he chose to film in Uganda after learning about the stigma experienced by some deaf children in the country. A five-minute clip from the film was shared on YouTube and Facebook, quickly gaining widespread support, with favourable comments on Twitter. Bogado subsequently served as series editor of Channel 4's Unreported World, the broadcaster's long-running international current affairs series.

In 2019, Bogado served as series director on Netflix's seven-part Brazilian true-crime series Killer Ratings (Bandidos na TV), about Wallace Souza, a popular television presenter and politician in Manaus who was accused of ordering murders and then featuring the crime scenes on his own television programme. The series was Netflix's first foreign-language documentary commission. It examines the allegations against Souza, his political career and the competing accounts of whether he was the head of a criminal organisation or the victim of a politically motivated prosecution. Reviewing the series for The Daily Beast, Nick Schager wrote that Bogado "skillfully navigates his narrative’s twists and turns", praising the series' balanced treatment of the competing claims surrounding Souza.

In 2021, Bogado directed 9/11: One Day in America, a documentary series for National Geographic about the 9/11 terrorist attacks. The series reconstructed the events of September 11 through extensive archival footage and first-person testimony from survivors and first responders, unfolding the day largely in chronological order. The series received critical acclaim. John Anderson of The Wall Street Journal described the series as a "tour de force", calling it "deliberately, painstakingly, enthrallingly thorough". David Sexton of the New Statesman wrote that the series "forces you to endure the day as never before; to experience it more directly, in greater detail".

In 2022, 9/11: One Day in America received six News & Documentary Emmy Award nominations and won Outstanding Historical Documentary. It also won the Broadcast Award for Best Documentary Series and the Royal Television Society Award for Best Documentary Series and was nominated for the BAFTA Award for Best Factual Series.

In 2024, Bogado directed the four-part National Geographic series Tsunami: Race Against Time, marking the 20th anniversary of the 2004 Indian Ocean tsunami. The series reconstructed the disaster across Indonesia, Thailand and Sri Lanka through archival footage and first-person accounts. In 2025, it won the News & Documentary Emmy Award for Outstanding Historical Documentary.

In 2025, Bogado directed Conviction: The Case of Lucy Letby, a Channel 4 documentary examining the case of former neonatal nurse Lucy Letby. The film also received a feature-length theatrical release.
