= Manassas High School =

High school in Memphis, Tennessee, US (1900–now)

Coordinates: 35.1707°N 90.0325°W

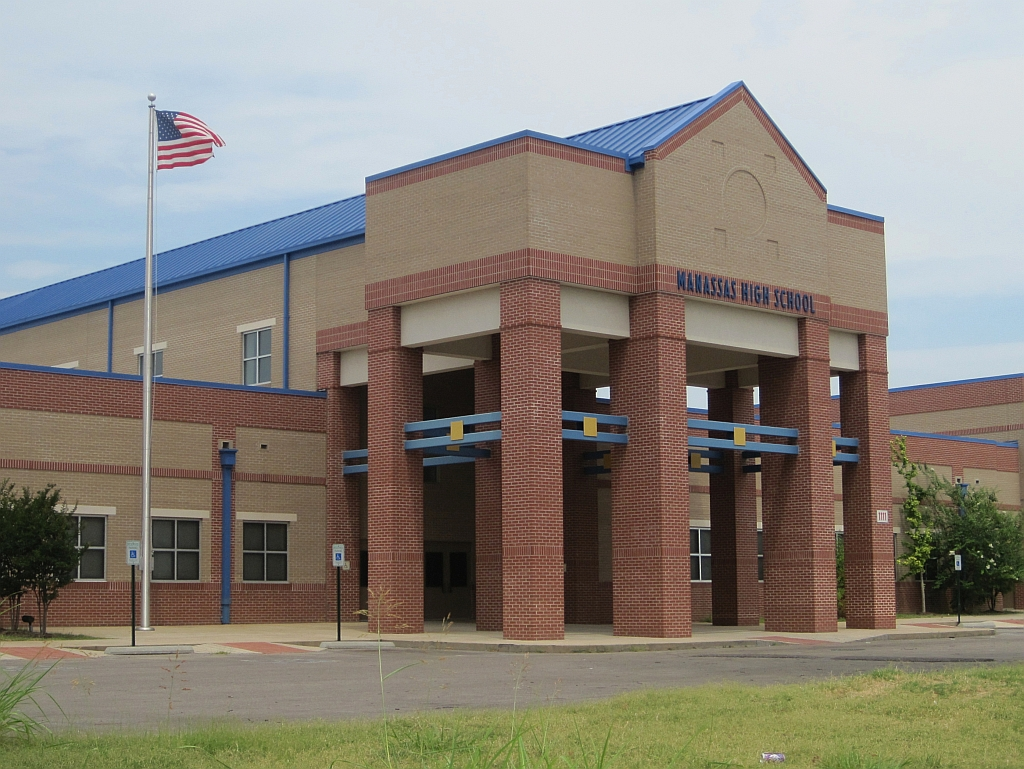

Location
- 1111 North Manassas St. Memphis, Tennessee, U.S.

Information
- Type: Public
- Established: 1900
- School district: Memphis-Shelby County Schools
- NCES District ID: 4700148
- NCES School ID: 470014801113
- Principal: Eric Cooper
- Teaching staff: 25.92 (FTE)
- Grades: 9-12
- Enrollment: 347 (2022-2023)
- Student to teacher ratio: 13.39
- Colors: Gold and blue
- Team name: Tigers

Manassas High School is a public high school in Memphis, Tennessee. As of 2022, the school had about 420 students of which 96 percent of whom were black. It was established in 1900 as a segregated Black school. In the 1920s, it was one of two high schools in Memphis for African American students. The high school has produced several prominent jazz musicians.

== History ==
The original Manassas was initially constructed in 1899 or 1900 at the intersection of Manassas and Firestone Ave and expanded using Rosenwald School funding in the 1920s. William H. Foote was the first principal of Manassas, and as of 2026, Eric Cooper is the current principal, and was succeeded by Cora Taylor in 1909. Under Taylor's tenure, the school went through two major building projects and had its first high school class graduate, having previously only taught up to eighth grade.

In 1940, it was listed as a "Negro" vocational school that taught service occupations. In 1954, it was listed as instructing auto mechanics. In 1946 the Tennessee Negro Athletic Association met in Nashville with the school's J. A. Hayes leading it. Boxer Joe Louis attended the school's 1948 football game against Booker T. Washington High School.

In 1952, a study of the intelligence of the school's students was published by Tennessee Agricultural and Industrial State University. In 1953, a report on the reasons for drop-outs given by students, teachers and parents from the school was published. In 1971, a study of female students attitude towards physical education at the school was published. Louis B. Hobson was principal in 1972 when plans to make the campus a middle school in the wake of desegregation were proposed.

Robert Samuel White Sr. was the school's principal for 14 years during the 1980s and 1990s.

In the 2001-2002 school year, Manassas transitioned from a middle/high school to a full fledged high school.

The new Manassas High School is situated on the former grounds of the Henry Oates apartments that was once occupied on the lot and demolished in 2002 known as the former of area of Scutterfield, in which groundbreaking took place around 2004 to 2005 for the new school to be opened around January 2008.

The 2011 documentary film Undefeated is about the school's football team and its former coach, Bill Courtney. Its football team has made 12 championship appearances and won twice.

== Notable alumni ==
- Houston Antwine, football player
- Clara Brawner, doctor
- Dee Dee Bridgewater, musician
- George Clarke, saxophonist
- George Coleman, musician
- Barbara Cooper, politician
- Hank Crawford, musician
- Isaac Hayes, musician and actor, did not graduate
- Booker Little, musician
- Jimmie Lunceford, musician
- Charles Lloyd, jazz multi-instrumentalist
- Harold Mabern, musician
- Phineas Newborn Jr., jazz pianist
- Will Redmond, football player
- Frank Strozier, jazz saxophonist
- Elma Stuckey, politician
- Burl Toler, football player
- Ernest Withers, photojournalist
- Earl Wright, signer and songwriter

== See also ==
- Hyde Park, Memphis
- List of high schools in Tennessee
- Memphis-Shelby County Schools
