= Torn (2021 film) =

2021 American documentary film by Max Lowe

Torn (2021 documentary)
- Directed by: Max Lowe
- Written by: Michael Harte
- Produced by: Chris Murphy; Max Lowe; Jonathan Chinn; Simon Chinn
- Starring: Max Lowe; Jennifer Lowe Anker; Conrad Anker; Sam Lowe Anker; Isaac Lowe Anker
- Narrated by: Max Lowe
- Cinematography: Logan Schneider
- Edited by: Michael Harte
- Production company: National Geographic Documentary Films
- Release date: December 3, 2021
- Running time: 92 minutes
- Country: United States
- Language: English

Torn is a 2021 American documentary film by photographer and explorer Max Lowe, son of the late climber Alex Lowe, who explored his father's high-profile mountain climbing death on the Himalayan peak, Mount Shishapangma, in 1999. His body was discovered in 2016, 17 years after his death. The film had its world premiere at the 2021 Telluride Film Festival and was released in the US on December 3, 2021. National Geographic Documentary Films produced the film in partnership with Lightbox.

== Synopsis ==
On October 5, 1999, Alex Lowe was killed by an avalanche on the slopes of the Tibetan mountain, Shishapangma. His best friend and climbing partner, Conrad Anker, survived the avalanche by fleeing the opposite direction. After the tragedy, Anker married Alex's widow, Jennifer, and stepped in to help raise Alex's three sons.

Max's inspiration for filming the documentary was the 2016 discovery of his father's body on Shishapangma. Two climbers found his body on the melted glacier where he had been buried by the avalanche. The family travelled to Tibet to retrieve and cremate his remains in a pyre at base camp. Weaving together archival footage of Alex's climbing adventures in home movies and interviews with Jennifer, Conrad, and sons Sam and Isaac, the film examines the impact of his father's life and death, and on his blended family.

Torn was streamed on Hulu, Disney+, and ESPN.

== Reception ==
Torn scored 100% on Rotten Tomatoes based on 19 reviews. It received The New York Times' Critic's Pick, and was one of several National Geographic Documentary Films to qualify for Oscar consideration in 2022. RogerEbert.com gave the film 4 out of 4 stars, calling it a "piercing and viscerally emotional film" and the LA Times called it "satisfyingly emotional without ever feeling sensationalized."

== Awards ==
Year	Category	Award	Result
2021	Grand Prize	Kendal Mountain Festival	Won
2021	Best Feature Film	Banff Mountain Film Festival	Won
2022	Best Climbing Film	Vancouver International Mountain Film Festival	Won
2022	Audience Award	Aspen Film Festival	Won
