= Whitney (2018 film) =

2018 film

- UK theatrical release poster
- Directed by: Kevin Macdonald
- Written by: Kevin Macdonald
- Produced by: Simon Chinn; Jonathan Chinn; Lisa Erspamer
- Starring: Whitney Houston
- Cinematography: Nelson Hume
- Edited by: Sam Rice-Edwards
- Music by: Adam Wiltzie
- Production companies: Miramax; Altitude; Lisa Erspamer Entertainment; Lightbox
- Distributed by: Roadside Attractions (United States); Altitude Film Distribution (United Kingdom)
- Release dates: 16 May 2018 (Cannes); 6 July 2018 (United States and United Kingdom)
- Running time: 122 minutes
- Countries: United States; United Kingdom
- Language: English
- Box office: $4.7 million

Whitney is a 2018 documentary film about the American singer and actress Whitney Houston. The film was directed by Kevin Macdonald and produced by Simon Chinn, Jonathan Chinn, and Lisa Erspamer. Whitney was screened out of competition at the world premiere as part of the 2018 Cannes Film Festival on 16 May 2018 with a cinema release on 6 July 2018. The film was also released on home media where it debuted at number one on the UK Official Music Video Chart. The film received positive reviews from critics and audiences and grossed $4.7 million worldwide at the box office. In December 2018, Whitney was nominated at the 61st Grammy Awards for Best Music Film.

== Production ==
=== Development ===
The concept of a documentary evolved when Lisa Erspamer worked as co-executive producer for the singer’s special two-part interview with Oprah Winfrey in 2009. In 2015 Erspamer approached Houston's sister-in-law Pat Houston and Houston’s film agent Nicole David to discuss the idea. David then suggested Scottish film director Kevin Macdonald. Co-producer Simon Chinn recalls: “We raised the full budget in 10 days exclusively from theatrical pre-sales which is quite possibly a first for a documentary.”

=== Filming ===
In July 2016, Macdonald began filming the interviews of around 70 people. Important members that are interviewed were Ellen White, a family friend, Mary Jones, longtime personal assistant, Houston’s older brothers Michael and Gary and other members of the Houston family. Houston’s mother Cissy was interviewed in Newark, New Jersey, others were conducted in Los Angeles, New York City and Atlanta.

More than 1,500 tapes of archival footage of varying quality were found including 250 masters, 2,000 stills and footage originally discovered on YouTube with Sam Dwyer as archive producer. Private footage was gathered from all over the world including Japan, the Netherlands and Los Angeles.

=== Post-production ===
A substantial amount of the editing, including changing screen size, and frame rate was done at Molinare, a post-production company in London’s Soho.

=== Music ===
Composer Adam Wiltzie was in charge of the film's music and score. Some excerpt examples used in the soundtrack for the film:

- "How Will I Know" performed by Whitney Houston
- "Here I Am (Take Me)" The Sweet Inspirations
- "Chain of Fools" by Aretha Franklin
- "Walk On By" Performed by Dionne Warwick
- "When Love Slips Away" Performed by Dee Dee Warwick
- "Theme from Valley of the Dolls" Performed by Whitney Houston
- "When I First Saw You" Performed by Cissy Houston
- "The Greatest Love of All" by Whitney Houston
- "I Am Changing" by Whitney Houston
- "I Wanna Dance with Somebody" & (Acappella) by Whitney Houston
- "Home" by Whitney Houston
- "So Emotional" by Whitney Houston
- "This Day" by Whitney Houston
- "Ain't It Funky Now" Performed by James Brown
- "I'm Your Baby Tonight" by Whitney Houston
- "I Have Nothing" by Whitney Houston
- "I Will Always Love You" by Whitney Houston
- "I Love the Lord" by Whitney Houston

== Release ==
The film is a joint British-American venture produced by Miramax, Lisa Erspamer Entertainment and Lightbox, in association with Altitude Film Entertainment, with Roadside Attractions and Altitude Film Distribution serving as distributors. Whitney was released in cinemas in the United States, United Kingdom and Ireland on 6 July 2018, by Roadside Attractions (US) and Altitude (UK and Ireland). It was also released in Australia and New Zealand on 26 July 2018.

The world premiere for the film was on 16 May 2018 at the Cannes Film Festival. Screenings also took place at the Edinburgh and Sydney Film Festivals.

=== Marketing ===
The official teaser trailer for the UK and Ireland was released by Altitude Films on 5 April 2018 on YouTube with the full trailer released on 25 May 2018.

=== Home media ===
It was released in widescreen by digital download on 2 October and DVD/Blu-ray on 16 October 2018. The DVD and Blu-ray releases include audio commentary from producer Simon Chinn and director Kevin Macdonald, photo gallery and theatrical trailer. The film debuted at #1 on 4 November 2018, staying at that position for two weeks on the UK Official Music Video Chart, based on sales of DVDs and other physical formats.

== Reception ==
=== Box office ===
Whitney began its release on 6 July 2018. During its opening weekend in the United States and Canada it grossed $1.3 million from 452 theaters, finishing 11th at the box office. 65% of its audience was female, with 35% being between the age of 25-49.

In the United Kingdom, the film opened on 6 July 2018 grossing £142,936 ($189,923) from 231 screens in its opening weekend, finishing twelfth at the box office. It grossed another £44,968 ($59,497) on 174 screens in its second weekend, a 68% decrease over the first week grossing a total of £323,532 ($428,066) through 10 days. Over 13 weeks it grossed a total of £459,725.

=== Critical response ===
On the review aggregator Rotten Tomatoes, the film holds an approval rating of 88% based on 164 reviews, with an average rating of 7.4/10. The website's critical consensus reads: "Whitney shifts from soaring highs to heartbreaking lows with palpable emotion and grace befitting its singular subject." On Metacritic, the film has a weighted average score of 75 out of 100, based on 37 critics, indicating "generally favorable reviews". Audiences polled by CinemaScore gave the film an average grade of "A" on an A+ to F scale.

Terri White for Empire gave it four out of five, calling it: "A sobering, haunting but completely fresh look at Whitney's life and death that will reframe everything you think you know about the singer." Owen Gleiberman of Variety wrote: "In Whitney, Macdonald lays out Houston's story—the light and the darkness—in a classically etched, kinetically edited way. He makes superb use of archival footage, tickles us with montages of her heyday (not just Houston but the whole era—the way her songs, in hindsight, tapped into a certain free-floating ’80s jubilance), and interviews her family members and associates. The film captures the quality that made Whitney Houston magical, but more than that it puts together the warring sides of her soul."

=== Awards and nominations ===
Award	Date of ceremony	Category	Recipient(s) and nominee(s)	Result
Grammy Award	10 February 2019	Best Music Film	Whitney	Nominated
Detroit Film Critics Society	3 December 2018	Best Documentary	Whitney	Nominated
Edinburgh Film Festival	28 June 2018	Best Documentary Feature Film	Whitney	Won
Guild of Music Supervisors Awards	13 February 2019	Best Music Supervision for a Documentary	Bree Winwood and Gary Welch - Whitney	Nominated
Critics' Circle Film Awards	20 January 2019	Documentary of the Year	Whitney	Nominated

== Charts ==
Chart (2018)	Peak position
Irish Music DVD Chart (IRMA)	3
UK Official Music Video Chart (OCC)	1

== See also ==
- List of British films of 2018
