= 9/11: One Day in America =

2021 American documentary television miniseries

- Promotional poster
- Genre: Documentary
- Directed by: Daniel Bogado
- Composer: David Schweitzer
- Country of origin: United States
- Original language: English
- No. of seasons: 1
- No. of episodes: 6

Production
- Executive producers: Dan Lindsay; T.J. Martin; David Glover
- Producer: Caroline Marsden
- Production companies: 72 Films; 9/11 Memorial Museum

Original release
- Network: National Geographic
- Release: August 29 – September 1, 2021

9/11: One Day in America is an American documentary television miniseries directed by Daniel Bogado and produced by Caroline Marsden. The series follows the (2001) September 11 attacks through archival footage, eyewitnesses, and survivors. The series consists of six episodes, the first at 1 hour and 14 minutes and the remaining five at 44 minutes each, for a total of 294 minutes viewing time (4 hours, 54 minutes). The series premiered on National Geographic in 2021 from August 29 to September 1.

The series received six nominations at the 43rd News & Documentary Emmy Awards, winning two, including Outstanding Historical Documentary. It also won the Royal Television Society Programme Award for Documentary Series and the Broadcast Award for Best Documentary Series, and was nominated for the BAFTA Television Award for Factual Series.

== Overview ==
The series follows the terrorist attacks through time-line archival footage, accounts from eyewitnesses and survivors, and with new footage never seen before by the public.

== Episodes ==
| No. | Title | Original release date | U.S. viewers (millions) |
|---|---|---|---|
| 1 | "First Response" | August 29, 2021 | 0.79 |
| 2 | "The South Tower" | August 30, 2021 | 0.68 |
| 3 | "Collapse" | August 30, 2021 | 0.82 |
| 4 | "The Cloud" | August 31, 2021 | 0.50 |
| 5 | "I'm Coming For You, Brother" | August 31, 2021 | 0.50 |
| 6 | "It's All Gone, Kid" | September 1, 2021 | 0.57 |

== Production ==
In May 2020, National Geographic announced a six-part documentary series commemorating the 20th anniversary of the September 11 attacks. The series was produced by 72 Films in official collaboration with the 9/11 Memorial & Museum.

The production took three years. The filmmakers interviewed 54 people for a total of 235 hours and sifted through 951 hours of archival footage, including material that had not previously been shown on television. The series was structured as a chronological, first-person account of the attacks, using testimony from survivors, eyewitnesses and first responders alongside contemporary footage.

Daniel Bogado directed the series, with Caroline Marsden serving as series producer. Dan Lindsay, T. J. Martin and David Glover served as executive producers for 72 Films, while Carolyn Payne was executive producer for National Geographic. Joe Bini served as story consultant and David Schweitzer composed the music, and the series was edited by Chris Nicholls, Audinga Kucinskaite, Dan Lavender and Sam Bergson.

== Release ==
Before its TV premiere, the series had its world premiere at the Tribeca Film Festival on June 11, 2021. It was screened at the Sheffield Doc/Fest on June 13, 2021. It was also screened at AFI Docs on June 24, 2021.

== Reception ==
=== Critical response ===
On Metacritic, the series received a score of 91 out of 100 based on four critic reviews, indicating "universal acclaim". John Anderson of The Wall Street Journal described the series as a "tour de force", adding: "The series is deliberately, painstakingly, enthrallingly thorough—so much so that the impact of the second plane into the south tower doesn't occur until halfway through the feature-length opener." David Sexton of New Statesman wrote: "However much you have watched footage of, or read about, the attacks, it forces you to endure the day as never before; to experience it more directly, in greater detail." Melanie McFarland of Salon wrote: "By having subjects speak directly into the camera, the filmmakers create an intimacy between the survivors and the viewers that makes is [sic] easier to bear witness and relive that nightmare with them and for them."

=== Viewing figures ===
Viewership and ratings per episode of 9/11: One Day in America
| No. | Title | Air date | Rating (18–49) | Viewers (millions) |
|---|---|---|---|---|
| 1 | "First Response" | August 29, 2021 | 0.2 | 0.79 |
| 2 | "The South Tower" | August 30, 2021 | 0.2 | 0.68 |
| 3 | "Collapse" | August 30, 2021 | 0.2 | 0.82 |
| 4 | "The Cloud" | August 31, 2021 | 0.1 | 0.50 |
| 5 | "I'm Coming For You, Brother" | August 31, 2021 | 0.1 | 0.50 |
| 6 | "It's All Gone, Kid" | September 1, 2021 | 0.1 | 0.57 |

=== Awards ===
| Year | Award | Category | Result |
|---|---|---|---|
| 2021 | The Buzzies Congress Awards for Excellence | Best History Long Format | Won |
| 2022 | News & Documentary Emmy Awards | Outstanding Historical Documentary | Won |
| 2022 | News & Documentary Emmy Awards | Outstanding Promotional Announcement | Won |
| 2022 | News & Documentary Emmy Awards | Outstanding Writing: Documentary | Nominated |
| 2022 | News & Documentary Emmy Awards | Outstanding Research: Documentary | Nominated |
| 2022 | News & Documentary Emmy Awards | Outstanding Music Composition | Nominated |
| 2022 | News & Documentary Emmy Awards | Outstanding Lighting Direction and Scenic Design | Nominated |
| 2022 | Royal Television Society Programme Awards | Documentary Series | Won |
| 2022 | Broadcast Awards | Best Documentary Series | Won |
| 2022 | Televisual Bulldog Awards | Best Documentary Series | Won |
| 2022 | BAFTA Television Awards | Factual Series | Nominated |
| 2022 | FOCAL International Awards | Best Use of Footage in a History Feature | Shortlisted |
| 2022 | Edinburgh TV Awards | Best Documentary | Shortlisted |
| 2022 | Grierson Awards | Best Documentary Series | Shortlisted |

== Legacy ==
National Geographic subsequently developed One Day in America into a documentary franchise. In 2023, the network described JFK: One Day in America as the second installment of the Emmy-winning One Day in America franchise.

National Geographic also produced a discussion guide for 9/11: One Day in America, containing discussion questions, thematic material and activities intended to accompany viewing of the series.

For the 25th anniversary of the attacks in 2026, National Geographic incorporated material originally filmed for 9/11: One Day in America into an interactive video archive containing more than 100 hours of footage and approximately 500 clips.
