= Vlado Taneski =

Macedonian serial killer

- Born: Vlado Taneski; 1952; Kičevo, SFR Yugoslavia
- Died: 23 June 2008 (aged 56); Tetovo, Macedonia
- Cause of death: Suicide
- Other name: Kičevo Monster
- Occupation: Former Journalist

Details
- Victims: 3–4
- Span of crimes: 2005–2008
- Country: North Macedonia
- Date apprehended: 22 June 2008

Vlado Taneski (Macedonian: Владо Танески; 1952 – 23 June 2008) was a Macedonian journalist and serial killer. He was arrested in June 2008 in Kičevo, his hometown, for the murders of two women on whose deaths he had also covered in-depth in freelance articles; when arrested he was also being investigated over the death of an additional woman. These articles had aroused the suspicion of the police as they contained information which had not been released to the public. After DNA results connected Taneski to the murders, he was arrested on 20 June 2008 and imprisoned on 22 June. Taneski was found dead in his cell the following morning, after an apparent suicide.

== Personal life ==
Vlado Taneski was born in 1952, the second of three children, in Kičevo, SFR Yugoslavia (now North Macedonia), a small town about 120 km southwest of the capital, Skopje. Both of his parents were conservative disciplinarians, and he had a particularly troubled relationship with his mother. His father was a World War II veteran. After studying journalism in Croatia, Taneski began an interest in poetry and writing. At age 21 he met his future wife, a law student named Vesna, with whom he was married for 31 years and had two sons. They had lived in a house with Taneski's parents for 25 years, but once after Vesna spoke ill about his mother the couple had an argument after which they became estranged, living sheltered, parallel lives.

Taneski initially worked at a radio station, while Vesna went on to become Kičevo's first female lawyer. By the 1980s he worked as a reporter for Skopje-based newspapers Nova Makedonija, Vreme, and Utrinski vesnik, and his career ultimately spanned twenty years. In August 2002 (Note: News articles have reported this year as 1990, however 2002 is the year given by his brother, Ljupcho Taneski.) his father committed suicide, and a few months later in December his mother accidentally overdosed on sleeping medicine. In 2003, exacerbating the financial problems he was facing, Taneski was laid off from Nova Makedonija, and his wife received a promotion and moved to Skopje.

== Murders ==
Taneski's victims were:

- Mitra Simjanoska (64) – disappeared on 16 November 2004 after a trip to the market. She was found on 12 January 2005. She had been strangled, bound, tortured, and raped, and had been dead for less than two weeks.
- Ljubica Licoska (56) – disappeared in early November 2007 after going to buy groceries; found on 3 February 2008. She had been strangled, bound, beaten, and raped, and had been dead for only a few days.
- Zivana Temelkoska (65) – disappeared on 7 May 2008 after responding to a hoax about her son being hospitalised; found on 16 May 2008. She had been tortured, raped, strangled, and was bound with telephone cords.

He was also suspected by the police to be involved in the 30 May 2003 disappearance of the 78-year-old retired cleaner, Gorica Pavleska, whose body had never been found.

All these women were poor, uneducated cleaners, which was also how Taneski's mother had earned a living. The victims, all from the small town of Kičevo (population of fewer than 20,000) living only metres away from his house, had known Taneski's mother personally, which may have been the reason for their selection as victims. All victims were found unclothed, strangled, bound with telephone cords, and inside nylon bags.

== Investigation and suicide ==
Taneski came under suspicion for murder after having written articles about the three murders and was questioned on several occasions. According to police, Taneski's articles contained information which had not been released to the public. For example, differing from all other reports published in the Macedonian press on the murders, Taneski knew what type of telephone cord the killer used to bind as his "signature weapon", and that the cord had been used to strangle as well as tie up the bodies of the women. He was also the reporter who connected the murders and attributed them to one single serial killer.

Taneski was arrested on 20 June 2008, after his DNA was matched to semen found on the victims. Examination of the Taneski family's rural cottage uncovered a cache of pornographic material, ropes and cords matching those used to tie the victims, and items belonging to the victims. Taneski was charged with the murder of two of the women, and the police were preparing to charge him with the murder of the third. Details of the case were printed on 21 June, and police were also planning to question Taneski on his suspected involvement of the 2003 disappearance of Gorica Pavleska. Only hours after being transferred on 22 June to a Tetovo jail to be held in pre-trial custody, Taneski was found dead in his prison cell, which he shared with two other men, on the morning of 23 June at 2:00. He had apparently drowned in a plastic bucket of water. An inquest concluded that, in the absence of other evidence, his death was suicide. (Note: An autopsy found that Taneski died by drowning, with water in his lungs, and his head having remained submerged after he lost consciousness. Investigators reported no defensive injuries or signs of a struggle, apart from a small bruise on his forehead and nose that may have occurred during spasms. According to the Ministry of the Interior, the scene showed no evidence of violence. Given Taneski's strong build, doubts were raised about whether his cellmates could have overpowered him without leaving injuries on themselves, and no clear motive for such an attack was apparent.)

== See also ==
- Wallace Souza – Brazilian journalist accused of setting up murders for ratings
- John Wayne Glover – nicknamed the "Granny Killer"
- Karol Kot – a Polish serial killer
- Krystian Bala - A Polish murderer caught under similar circumstances
- List of serial killers by country
