= Clara Brawner =

African-American physician (1929–1991)

Clara Arena Brawner (August 29, 1929 – October 4, 1991) was the only African-American woman physician in Memphis, Tennessee, in the mid-1950s.

== Early life ==
The daughter of a pediatric physician and a registered nurse, Brawner was born in Georgia and raised in Memphis and attended Manassas High School. Her parents are Dr. Jeff Brawner and Rena Darden Brawner. Brawner had a younger sister named Alpha Brawner-Floyd, a world-renowned soprano opera singer. She attended Spelman College for her undergraduate education, then moved to Nashville, Tennessee for medical school, and followed in her father's footsteps by graduating from Meharry Medical College in 1954.

== Career ==
After a yearlong internship at her alma mater, Meharry's Hubbard Hospital, Brawner returned to Memphis, where she practiced pediatrics at several hospitals.

== Community involvement ==
Brawner held numerous roles in her community and was affiliated with many health organizations. She was the chair of the Collins Chapel Hospital pediatrics department and its scientific research department worked for the Veterans' Administration and was a leader in the Bluff City Medical Society, the Memphis Department of Public Health, and the Shelby County Department of Public Health. She was a Fellow of the American Academy of Family Physicians, chaired the Family Practice Section of the National Medical Association, and received many community service awards. Brawner was president and officer of the Bluff City Medical Society for 15 years, helping the organization to survive through the 1960s after the number of African-American physicians practicing in Memphis fell from 40 in 1930 to 12 in 1960. She was the first female president of the society and she was also the first female president of the Volunteer State Medical Association in 1963. Brawner helped in starting the Memphis Health Center Clinic and she also served as the medical director of the Goodwill Homes for Children in the Greater Memphis Area.

Brawner was very involved in her local religious community and an active member of Gospel Temple Baptist Church where she served as a Sunday School and Bible class teacher, Trustee Board member, Superintendent of Junior Ushers and chair of the Ministerial Council.

Awards

- The Dr. King Service Award
- Mayor's staff aide-de-camp (City of Memphis)
- Physician's Achievement Award
- Family Practice Service Award

Recognitions

- Memphians Inc.
- The National Medical Association
- Memphis Health Center
- North Memphis Civic Club

== Later life ==
In 1989, she began studying theology at the Memphis Theological Seminary, and continued her studies until her death in 1991.

Children

Brawner is survived by a daughter.
