= Earl Wright =

American singer-songwriter

Earl Wright (September 27, 1948 – August 7, 2013) was an American singer, songwriter, musician, and Vietnam veteran from Memphis, Tennessee. Wright wrote Southern blues songs in the 1960s before being drafted in the Vietnam War.

== Early life ==
Wright was born to parents Robert Sr. and Clara Wright in Memphis, Tennessee. He was the youngest of six children. Wright attended Manassas High School (along with Isaac Hayes) where he graduated in 1968.

== Career ==
Wright began his writing career in the heart of Memphis, home to Stax Records and the renowned Willie Mitchell. He assisted in writing hit songs. Wright was scheduled to appear on the Memphis' own version of Band Stand, but plan was canceled as Wright was drafted into the Vietnam War and sent to training camp.

== Musical career ==
In 1974, Wright wrote "Six Nights and a Day" for Candi Staton's album, The Best of Candi Staton.

Wright later recorded and wrote two songs which became hits in the United Kingdom, "Them Love Blues" and "I Don't Know". Wright had a distinguished sound that consisted of horns and bass lines.
