= Ernest Withers =

American photographer (1922 –2007)

Ernest Columbus Withers, Sr.
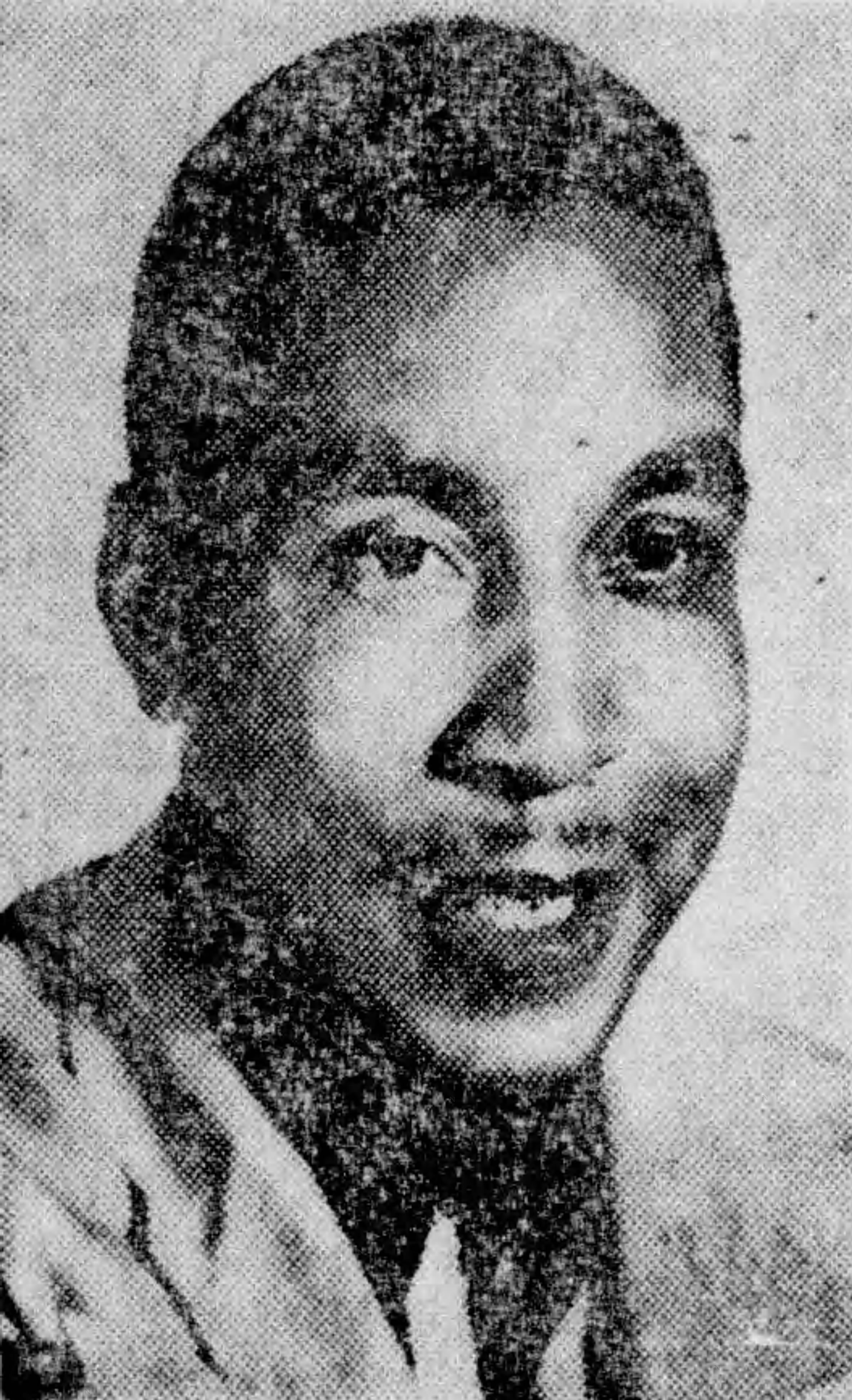
- Withers in 1960
- Born: August 7, 1922; Memphis, Tennessee, U.S.
- Died: October 15, 2007 (aged 85); Memphis, Tennessee, U.S.
- Occupations: Freelance photographer; policeman
- Notable work: Photographs of the segregated South in the 1940s–2000s, Negro league baseball, and the Memphis blues scene.

Ernest Columbus Withers, Sr. (August 7, 1922 – October 15, 2007) was an African-American photojournalist. He documented over 60 years of African-American history in the segregated Southern United States, with iconic images of the Montgomery bus boycott; Emmett Till; Memphis sanitation strike; Negro league baseball; and musicians, including those related to Memphis blues and Memphis soul.

Withers's work has been archived by the Library of Congress and has been slated for the permanent collection of the Smithsonian Institution's National Museum of African American History and Culture, in Washington, D.C.

== Early life ==
Ernest Columbus Withers was born in Memphis, Tennessee, to Arthur Withers and Pearl Withers of Marshall County, Mississippi; he had a step-mother known as Mrs. Minnie Withers. Withers exhibited interest in photography from a young age. He took his first photograph in high school after his sister gave him a camera she received from a classmate. He met his wife Dorothy Curry of Brownsville, Tennessee (they remained married for 66 years), at Manassas High School in Memphis, Tennessee.

During World War II, he received training at the Army School of Photography. After the war, Withers served as one of Memphis' first African-American police officers.

== Personal life ==
Withers and his wife Dorothy had eight children together (seven boys and one girl, Rosalind Withers). He also had a second daughter from Memphis, Tennessee, named Frances Williams. All of his sons accompanied him as apprentice photographers at different points in his career, including Ernest, Jr., Perry O., Clarence (Joshua), E., Wendell J., Dedrick (Teddy) J., Dyral L., and Andrew (Rome). His business was called Withers Photography Studio.

Withers enjoyed traveling, visiting family members and entertaining guests at his home, including Brock Peters, Jim Kelly, Eartha Kitt, Alex Haley, Ivan van Sertima, Stokley Carmichael (Kwame Ture), and many others from the entertainment world and black consciousness movement. He attended Gospel Temple Baptist Church in Memphis, Tennessee. He was also an all-round (high-school to professional) sports enthusiast.

== Career ==
Withers was active for approximately 60 years, with his most noted work being the images captured of the Civil Rights Movement.

Complete Photo Story of Till Murder Case, a pamphlet published by Withers covering the murder of Emmett Till

He traveled with Martin Luther King Jr. during his public life. Withers's coverage of the Emmett Till murder trial brought national attention to the racial violence taking place during the 1950s in Mississippi, among other places. Withers appeared in a TV documentary about the murdered 14-year-old entitled The American Experience: The Murder of Emmett Till.

Withers served as official photographer for Stax Records for 20 years.

Withers's work was included in the 2025 exhibition Photography and the Black Arts Movement, 1955–1985 at the National Gallery of Art.

Between 1 million and 5 million images are estimated to have been taken during Withers's career, with current efforts in progress for preservation and digitization.

== Death ==
In 2007, Withers died from the complications of a stroke in his hometown of Memphis.

== FBI informant ==
In 2013, the FBI released documents relating to Withers in response to a Freedom of Information Act (FOIA) request by a Memphis newspaper, The Commercial Appeal.

The FBI documents start in 1946 with the FBI investigating Withers as a possible communist, as he was a member of the United Negro Allied Veterans of America (UNAVA) after serving in World War II, and the group was alleged by the FBI at the time to have communist ties. The FBI investigation of Withers as a potential communist extended through 1948, concluding with their outreach to an "informant" labeled T-3 that provided information that Withers no longer had ties to the United Negro Allied Veterans of America.

ME 338-R was referenced as an "informant" for two years, 1968 through the final report in 1970, with 19 reports that include some reference to the informant. A total of 10 pictures were provided by the informant in the released documents.

A 1968 document contains the first reference to an informant, ME 338-R, a reference to Withers and inferred by the FBI's responses to FOIA court actions. ME 338-R was questioned and queried for general information, and provided a total of approximately 10 photographs alongside brief descriptions of publicly known meetings and events. There is limited specific information, commonly relating to a militant group named the Invaders. ME 338-R recorded the violence and connections of the Invaders including a leaflet on the manufacturing of firebombs, and links to prostitution.

Withers died years before the FOIA request was made. At the 2000 Withers exhibition at the Chrysler Museum of Art in Norfolk, Virginia, Withers said he had FBI agents regularly looking over his shoulder and questioning him. "I never tried to learn any high powered secrets," Withers said. "It would have just been trouble.…[The FBI] was pampering me to catch whatever leaks I dropped, so I stayed out of meetings where decisions were being made".

Civil rights leader Andrew Young commented after the release of the FBI file: "The movement was transparent and didn't have anything to hide anyway".

A later book authored by Preston Lauterbauch discussed Withers brief encounter with the FBI, and explained that he likely saw the federal government, and thus the FBI, as protection at that moment for the civil rights movement, as the FBI had helped the movement in Memphis in a voting discrimination case, which Withers covered through photography. It was also the federal government that deployed the National Guard to protect the Little Rock Nine, which was also photographed and witnessed by Withers.

A member of the Invaders, John B. Smith, to which Withers was apparently provided information, harshly criticized the initial reporting on Withers' FBI ties and remarked, "I think he deserves a statue somewhere".

== Ernest Withers Museum and Collection ==
The Ernest Withers Museum and Collection opened in Memphis, Tennessee, on Beale Street in May 2011. The Museum features images of Ernest Withers spanning the eras of his work, while the complete archive is held in an offsite location. The Withers Museum and Collection is approximately 7,000 square feet.

== Publications ==
- Worley, William (1998). Beale Street: Crossroads of America's Music. Addax Pub Group Inc. ISBN 978-1-886110-18-2.
- Withers, Ernest (2000). Pictures Tell the Story : Ernest C. Withers Reflections in History. Chrysler Museum of Art. ISBN 978-0-940744-68-4.
- Withers, Ernest (2001). The Memphis Blues Again: Six Decades of Memphis Music Photographs. Studio. ISBN 978-0-670-03031-6.
- Withers, Ernest (2005). Negro League Baseball. Harry N. Abrams. ISBN 978-0-8109-5585-1.
- Withers, Ernest (2019). Ernest Withers and the FBI: The Confidential Informant Files, Volume One. Clear Lens Publishing. ISBN 978-1-7939-3124-5.
- Withers, Ernest (2020). Bluff City: The Secret Life of Photographer Ernest Withers. W. W. Norton & Company. ISBN 978-0-393358-08-7.

== See also ==
- List of photographers of the civil rights movement
