= Ferguson Rises =

2021 Documentary film

Ferguson Rises is a 2021 documentary film about the Shooting of Michael Brown.

The film premiered on US broadcast television on November 8, 2021, on Independent Lens on PBS.
