= Tina (film) =

2021 documentary film about Tina Turner

- Television release poster
- Directed by: Dan Lindsay; T. J. Martin
- Produced by: Diane Becker; Jonathan Chinn; Simon Chinn
- Starring: Tina Turner
- Cinematography: Dimitri Karakatsansis; Megan Stacey
- Edited by: Taryn Gould; Carter Gunn; T. J. Martin
- Music by: Danny Bensi; Saunder Jurriaans
- Production companies: HBO Documentary Films; Lightbox
- Distributed by: HBO (United States); Altitude Film Distribution; Sky Documentaries (United Kingdom and Ireland)
- Release dates: March 2, 2021 (Berlinale); March 27, 2021 (United States); March 28, 2021 (United Kingdom)
- Running time: 118 minutes
- Countries: United States; United Kingdom
- Language: English
- Box office: $241,581

Tina is a 2021 documentary film directed by Dan Lindsay and T. J. Martin. It follows the life and career of musician Tina Turner. The film marked the final appearance of Turner before her death on May 24, 2023.

A world premiere was held at the Berlin International Film Festival on March 2, 2021. It was released in the United States on March 27, 2021, by HBO, and in the United Kingdom on March 28, 2021, by Altitude Film Distribution.

== Synopsis ==
The film follows the life and career of musician Tina Turner, with Turner appearing in the film alongside Angela Bassett, Oprah Winfrey, Kurt Loder, Katori Hall, Erwin Bach, Carl Arrington, Jimmy Thomas, Le'Juene Fletcher, Rhonda Graam, Roger Davies and Terry Britten.

In a March 2021 interview with Today, Turner described the film as a parallel story to her memoir Happiness Becomes You, which was released in December 2020 by Atria Books. The film is dedicated to Tina Turner's son Craig Turner and to Rhonda Graam who was Tina Turner's close friend, road manager and personal assistant for over 45 years.

== Production ==
In May 2018, it was announced Dan Lindsay and T. J. Martin would direct the film, with Tina Turner set to participate with Altitude Film Distribution set to distribute in the United Kingdom.

== Release ==
Tina had its world premiere at the Berlin International Film Festival on March 2, 2021. It was released in the United States on March 27, 2021, by HBO. The film drew 1.1 million viewers, the best ratings for an HBO documentary since Leaving Neverland (2019), which had 1.3 million viewers tune into part one. It was released theatrically in the United Kingdom on March 28, 2021, by Altitude Film Distribution, and simulcast on Sky Documentaries. Universal Pictures Home Entertainment distributed the documentary elsewhere.

== Reception ==
Upon its premiere at the 2021 Berlin Film Festival, the film received positive reviews from critics. The review aggregator website Rotten Tomatoes reports that 92% of 86 reviews of the film were positive, with an average rating of 8/10. The website's consensus reads, "Tina recounts the ups and downs of the singer's life with startling candor and insight, providing an inspiring testament to resilience."

Reportedly, Turner's son Ronnie Turner and his wife Afida Turner felt the film was "well done" in that it "credited Ike for his success as a singer-songwriter." The couple, as well as Turner's adopted sons Ike Turner Jr. and Michael Turner, were disappointed that her sons were not asked to be involved in the film and it didn't examine Turner's estranged relationship with her children.

== Awards and nominations ==
Year	Award	Category	Nominee(s)	Result	Ref.
2021	Primetime Emmy Awards	Outstanding Documentary or Nonfiction Special	Nancy Abraham, Erwin Bach, Lisa Heller, Tali Pelman, Simon Chinn, Jonathan Chinn and Diane Becker	Nominated	
2021	Primetime Emmy Awards	Outstanding Directing for a Documentary/Nonfiction Program	Dan Lindsay and T. J. Martin	Nominated	
2021	Primetime Emmy Awards	Outstanding Sound Mixing for a Nonfiction or Reality Program (Single or Multi-Camera)	Lawrence Everson and Phil McGowan	Nominated	
