= Daniel Lindsay =

American filmmaker, actor and producer

Dan Lindsay is an American documentary filmmaker. He is the co-director, producer and an editor of the 2011 sports documentary Undefeated, which received the 2011 Oscar for Best Documentary Feature.

Lindsay and T. J. Martin co-directed LA 92 for National Geographic Channel in 2017, which went on to win the Primetime Emmy Award for Exceptional Merit in Documentary Filmmaking.

In 2021, Lindsay and T. J. Martin co-directed a documentary film about the life of singer Tina Turner, titled Tina, for HBO. The same year, Lindsay and Martin signed a first look deal with Imagine Documentaries.

In 2023, Lindsay and T. J. Martin founded a production company, Everyone Else, dedicated to telling compelling stories from all walks of life. The company works across a diverse range of styles, mediums, and platforms, with a focus on cinematic documentary films and series. Everyone Else's first production was the four-part series Earnhardt about legendary NASCAR driver Dale Earnhardt, which debuted on Amazon Prime Video in May 2025.

== Filmography ==
=== As director ===
==== Film ====
Year	Title	Notes
2008	Last Cup: Road to the World Series of Beer Pong	Also writer
2011	Undefeated	
2013	My Favorite Picture of You	Short film
2015	I Am Dying	
2017	LA 92	Credited as Dan Lindsay
2021	Tina	Also writer

==== Television ====
Year	Title	Notes
2018	Dogs	Episode: "Territorio de Zaguates"

=== As producer ===
==== Film ====
Year	Title	Notes
2011	Undefeated	Credited as Dan Lindsay
2013	My Favorite Picture of You	
2017	Copwatch	Executive producer
2020	Yusuf Hawkins: Storm Over Brooklyn	Executive producer; television film

==== Television ====
Year	Title	Notes
2021	9/11: One Day in America	Executive producer 5 episodes
2023	JFK: One Day in America	Executive producer 3 episodes Credited as Dan Lindsay
2024	Cult Massacre: One Day in Jonestown	Executive producer Episode: "The Promised Land"; Credited as Dan Lindsay
2025	Earnhardt	Executive producer 4 episodes

=== As actor ===
Year	Title	Role	Notes
2006	Missed Connection	Dan	Short film
2007	Entourage	Waiter	Episode: "Sorry, Harvey"; Credited as Dan Lindsay
2008	Cute Couple	Zach	Short film
2021	Riverdale	Sean McPharlin	Episode: "Chapter Eighty-Eight: Citizen Lodge"

== Awards and nominations ==
Year	Award	Category	Nominated work	Result
2012	Academy Awards	Best Documentary Feature Film	Undefeated	Won
2012	Black Reel Awards	Outstanding Documentary	Undefeated	Nominated
2017	Primetime Emmy Awards	Exceptional Merit in Documentary Filmmaking	LA 92	Won
2017	Black Reel TV Awards	Outstanding Television Documentary or Special	LA 92	Nominated
2017	Seattle Film Critics Society Awards	Best Documentary Feature	LA 92	Nominated
2021	Black Reel TV Awards	Outstanding Television Documentary or Special	Tina	Won
2021	Primetime Emmy Awards	Outstanding Directing for a Documentary/Nonfiction Program	Tina	Nominated
2022	British Academy Television Awards	Best Factual Series	9/11: One Day in America	Nominated
