= Tell Me Who I Am =

2019 documentary film

- Directed by: Ed Perkins
- Produced by: Simon Chinn
- Starring: Alex Lewis; Marcus Lewis
- Cinematography: Erik Alexander Wilson
- Edited by: David Charap
- Music by: Gary Welch
- Distributed by: Netflix
- Release date: 18 October 2019
- Running time: 86 minutes
- Country: United Kingdom
- Language: English

Tell Me Who I Am is a 2019 documentary film directed and produced by the British filmmaker Ed Perkins. It focuses on twin brothers Alex and Marcus Lewis. Alex lost his memory in a motorcycle accident at age 18, and his twin brother Marcus helps him reconstruct their childhood memories. The film explores their journey of rediscovery and the challenges they face as they come to terms with their past. The documentary is based on a 2013 book written by the twins together with Joanna Hodgkin.

The film was commissioned by and aired on Netflix. It received acclaim from critics after its release and was described as "harrowing" and "involving but upsetting".

== Synopsis ==
The documentary is split into three parts. In the first part, the viewer follows Alex trying to solve the mystery of his past and trying to figure out who he is after losing his memory in a motorcycle accident at age 18 in 1982. His twin brother, Marcus, is the only person he remembers after emerging from a coma – including himself. Marcus helps him to reintegrate into life. At first, Alex functions like a child, asking basic questions like, "what is this?" to nearly everything and re-learning how to ride a bike. As he rapidly "matures", Alex begins to ask questions about their childhood. Marcus paints a picture of a happy, wealthy, well-connected family for Alex.

In the second part, Marcus reveals that he omitted a dark family secret from Alex in order to protect him from harrowing memories of their shared past. Marcus further emotionally admits that as he created a fantasy life for Alex, he began to believe it himself and was better-able to suppress his own memories of the family secret.

After their parents both die, the brothers embark on an effort to clean out the vast English estate house they left behind, which is jam-packed with flotsam and jetsam. In the process, Alex finds puzzling items, including a wardrobe filled with sex toys, which Marcus tells him to disregard. The last straw is a photograph Alex finds in a secret closet in his mother's room of the two boys at age ten, naked and with the heads cut off. Alex confronts Marcus, asking whether their mother had sexually abused them. Marcus simply nods and says nothing more. For the next 20+ years, Marcus refuses to give any further information to Alex about what happened to them, causing Alex further distress and a sense of inability to understand who he is. He becomes obsessed with learning details of his mother's life, and discovers that her entire life revolved around sex.

In the third part, Marcus and Alex sit down together to discuss their past, and while Marcus confirms Alex's suspicion, he refuses to provide details, saying that he cannot bring himself to reveal more in his brother's presence, and instead tells Alex to watch part of his interview with the documentary crew that contains the rest of the truth: he reveals that their mother not only sexually abused them together in her own bed, but that she was also involved in a child sex ring wherein she volunteered her own sons to other child predators. She would drive one of the boys (never both) to different male "friends" of hers all over Britain and those friends would assault and rape them. This continued up until the age of 14, when Marcus fought back, at which time it stopped for both brothers. Marcus apologizes to Alex for not telling the whole story at age 32, but states that he was not able to do it because he was too traumatized himself, and that denying what had happened helped him forget about it and live a worth-while life.

== Background ==
The documentary film is based on the book with the same name written by the twins and Joanna Hodgkin.

== Book ==
- Tell Me Who I Am ISBN 978-1444757262
