= Sinal Livre =

- Genre: Crime; Variety show
- Presented by: Wallace Souza
- Country of origin: Brazil
- Original language: Portuguese

Production
- Producer: Vanessa Lima
- Production location: Manaus

Original release
- Network: TV Rio Negro
- Release: 1996 – 2009

Related
- Programa Livre (2013-2016)

Sinal Livre is a Brazilian news program with a police format broadcast by the local TV channel TV Bandeirantes Amazonas. It was known for being at first presented by the former police officer and former politician Wallace Souza under the name Canal Livre and was the most popular show in the city of Manaus. Souza's popularity as host of Canal Livre saw him get elected on three occasions to political office.

The show remained on air until 2009 and came to worldwide attention in August 2009 when it was revealed that the presenter had been accused of hiring hitmen to carry out the crimes his show was documenting. Souza was accused of involvement in at least five murders from 2007 to February 2009, relating to the deaths of people who stole cars and dealt drugs. It is thought the murders were commissioned to increase the program's rating even further and to eliminate all opposition.

In 2013 the program returned to the air under the title Programa Livre, transmitted through TV Em Tempo, SBT's affiliate in Manaus, being hosted by Carlos Souza until 2016. The show returned again in 2021 under the command of Willace Souza as Sinal Livre.

== Format ==
The show followed the format of a police news program about crimes, however, around 1998 it followed a format similar to the popular SBT's TV show Programa do Ratinho, where it had an audience with a maximum of 50 people and presented popular content between the reports such as music, interviews and humor.

Canal Livre detailed the murders of various criminal figures, with the camera crews regularly arriving on the crime scene before police. It is this which drew suspicion from detectives who investigated the role of the show in these deaths. Souza's role was as a studio presenter preaching about crime and broadcasting what was deemed "exclusive" coverage of crimes.

== Investigation ==
One of the crimes reported on the show involved a reporter walking through a forest to examine a burning corpse, telling viewers: “It smells like a barbecue. It is a man. It has the smell of burning meat. The impression is that it was in the early hours... it was an execution.” Suspicion arose from this when questions were raised about how the reporter knew the time of the murder.

Investigators were disrupted by Souza and some had their lives threatened. Souza, however, denied any complicity in the deaths, describing the allegations as "absurd" and saying he tried to fight corruption and paedophilia among other crimes. Until October 2009, he was not charged with murder because his position as an elected state official granted him parliamentary immunity. But after being expelled from the assembly, he was indicted on multiple charges. Vanessa Lee, the former producer of the program, was arrested in December 2009. Souza hid from the police at first, but later turned himself in. He died of a heart attack in 2010 while awaiting trial.

== Internet Memes ==
Around 2016, scenes from the show involving stage assistants Gil and Galerito having conflicts in the 2000s went viral on the internet. Gil da Esfirra was a stage entertainer characterized by being an sfiha seller who often appeared sitting with a plastic basin full of old sfihas to sell to the audience and also getting angry very easily, while Galerito was a puppet known for constantly making dirty jokes and also teasing Gil, usually bullying him by calling him as Rogério and subject to homophobic slurs, which usually made Gil want to retaliate by attacking the puppet or the puppeteer. A video containing one of these scenes involving one of the fights between Gil vs. Galerito eventually became an internet meme, where Gil tries to attack the puppeteer at the same time as the show is featuring a performance by the brega singer Nunes Filho singing the song "Fogo do Amor".

The video involving the conflict between Gil vs. Galerito during Nunes Filho's performance served as inspiration for a music video for the song "Processed by the Boys" by the American band Protomartyr in 2020.
