= LA 92 (film) =

- Theatrical and TV release poster
- Directed by: Daniel Lindsay; T. J. Martin
- Produced by: Jonathan Chinn; Simon Chinn; Sarah Gibson
- Edited by: Daniel Lindsay; T. J. Martin; Scott Stevenson
- Music by: Danny Bensi; Saunder Jurriaans
- Distributed by: National Geographic Documentary Films; Fox Searchlight Pictures (uncredited)
- Release dates: April 21, 2017 (Tribeca); April 28, 2017 (United States)
- Running time: 114 minutes
- Country: United States
- Language: English

LA 92 is a 2017 American documentary film about the 1992 Los Angeles riots, directed by Daniel Lindsay and T. J. Martin. It premiered at the Tribeca Film Festival on April 21, 2017, opened in theaters on April 28, 2017 and aired on National Geographic Channel on April 30, 2017.

== Synopsis ==
Consisting entirely of archival footage, the documentary chronicles the 1992 Los Angeles riots after 25 years have passed.

It includes film and video from the 1965 Watts Riots, the 1973 election of Tom Bradley, the 1978 promotion of Daryl Gates, the shooting of Latasha Harlins, the Rodney King videotape and the subsequent riots and violence that erupted after the acquittal of the officers involved in King's beating.

The footage includes public pronouncements by U.S. President George H. W. Bush, presidential candidate Bill Clinton, California governor Pete Wilson, chief of the Los Angeles Police Department Daryl Gates (questioned by the LA city council at one point), judge Joyce Karlin, US Congresswoman Maxine Waters, victim Rodney King, and acquitted police officers Stacey Koon and Laurence Powell.

== Reception ==
On Rotten Tomatoes, the film has an approval rating of 96%, based on 28 reviews. On Metacritic, the film has a score of 66 out of 100, based on eight critics, indicating "Generally Favorable" reviews.

=== Accolades ===
The film won the Primetime Emmy Award for Exceptional Merit in Documentary Filmmaking, beating out Oscar winners O.J.: Made in America and The White Helmets among others.

== See also ==
- Let It Fall: Los Angeles 1982–1992
- Culture of Los Angeles
- Undefeated – 2011 Oscar-winning film directed by Lindsay and Martin
- 1992 in television
