= Keith Summa =

American television news producer and executive

- Occupations: Television new producer, executive

Keith Summa is an American television news producer and executive. Summa currently serves as Senior Vice President of Content & Programming for Univision. From 2007 to 2012 Summa headed CBS News' investigative unit. For 15 years prior he was a producer for ABC News and Peter Jennings Productions. Summa has received the George Polk Award, the Alfred I. duPont–Columbia University Award, the Peabody Award, and several News & Documentary Emmy Awards for his work in television news production.

== Education and career ==
Summa graduated from New York University's Tisch School of the Arts in 1986 with a bachelor of fine arts degree. Before his career in journalism, he served as the Advocacy Director for the Coalition for the Homeless.

From 1992 to 2007, Summa was a producer for ABC News and Peter Jennings Productions. He began that tenure as an associate producer for ABC News investigative correspondent Brian Ross and for the newsmagazine Day One. Summa's documentaries for Peter Jennings Reporting include Peter Jennings' last documentary, Breakdown: America's Health Insurance Crisis, which revealed the dangers of rising health care costs, as well as From the Tobacco Files, exposing failures of the public health community; How To Get Fat Without Really Trying, examining how agriculture policies and excessive marketing to children contribute to obesity; Bitter Medicine: Pills, Profit and the Public Health, an investigation of the pharmaceutical industry; The Gunfight, an exclusive look inside the National Rifle Association of America; and Never Say Die: How the Tobacco Industry Keeps on Winning, an investigation of the tobacco industry's political tactics. In 2007 he produced the Bob Woodruff primetime special To Iraq And Back. His investigative reporting on tobacco, health care and firearms also appeared on World News Tonight, Good Morning America, and Nightline. In addition, Summa was a regular contributor to ABC News Radio and ABCNews.com. His reporting on the tobacco industry was chronicled in the book Civil Warriors by Dan Zegart.

On August 20, 2012, Summa joined Univision as vice president of news partnerships. In this role he serves as a liaison for the network to ABC News.

== Awards ==
In 1994 Summa, Walt Bogdanich, and John Martin were awarded a George Polk Award for network television reporting for their work on ABC News' television magazine, Day One. Summa was honored in 2010, 2011, and 2012 with News & Documentary Emmy Awards for his work as senior producer on CBS Evening News with Katie Couric. He has also received the Alfred I. duPont–Columbia University Award, the Peabody Award, and the Edward R. Murrow Award.
