= Copwatch (film) =

- Film poster
- Directed by: Camilla Hall
- Music by: Kris Bowers
- Distributed by: Gunpowder & Sky
- Release date: April 23, 2017 (Tribeca)
- Country: United States
- Language: English

Copwatch is a 2017 documentary film about the Copwatch group of activists. It depicts the organization WeCopWatch, including segments on Ramsey Orta, Kevin Moore, who filmed the police abuse of Freddie Gray, and David Whitt who lived in the apartment complex where Michael Brown was killed, as well as Jacob Crawford, who seeded and co-founded Copwatch groups inspired by the Berkeley Copwatch group. Director Camilla Hall was on the front lines recording the WeCopWatch activists. She describes her film as "a plea for humanity. A plea to look out for each other; to look out for your neighbor. To not walk by when something terrible is happening to somebody else and taking that active decision to look out for one another,"

The film premiered at the 2017 Tribeca Film Festival and became available On Demand on October 6, 2017.

== Cast ==
- Jacob Crawford
- Kevin Moore
- Ramsey Orta
- David Whitt

== Reviews ==
On review aggregator Rotten Tomatoes, the film holds an approval rating of 56% based on 9 reviews, with an average rating of 6.49/10.

Black Entertainment Television (BET) called the movie "Not only timely, but important." Variety magazine said "The documentary's handheld cinematography was ho-hum and its use of melodramatic music is graceless, "Copwatch" is finally undone by an inability to show that the work of WeCopwatch has reaped any rewards."
