= Wallace Souza =

Brazilian television presenter and politician (1958–2010)

- Born: Francisco Wallace Cavalcante de Souza; August 12, 1958; Manaus, Amazonas, Brazil
- Died: 27 July 2010 (aged 51); São Paulo, São Paulo, Brazil
- Education: College of Business São Luiz Gonzaga; State College Basílio Machado; University Nilton Lins
- Occupations: Presenter, politician
- Known for: Presenting Canal Livre
- Political party: Progressive Party
- Children: 4
- Parent(s): Lucimar Portela de Souza; Maria Odila Cavalcante de Souza

Wallace Souza (12 August 1958 – 27 July 2010) was a Brazilian television presenter and politician. He was an elected member of the Legislative Assembly of Amazonas until his expulsion in October 2009. Souza was commonly known for presenting the controversial news program Canal Livre.

In 2009 Wallace was subject to worldwide media coverage when police launched an investigation into claims that he had arranged for murders to occur in order to boost ratings for his program. Souza died after being formally charged with murder before trial. Two alleged confederates were found not guilty, but Souza's son Rafael was sentenced to nine years for homicide.

== Early and personal life ==
Wallace Souza was born in Manaus, Amazonas, Brazil. He obtained degrees at the College of Business São Luiz Gonzaga and the State College Basílio Machado, and also attended the Center for Study of Human Behavior and University Nilton Lins. He was married and had four children.

In 1979, Souza became a police officer, but was fired after he was arrested for pension fraud and petrol theft in 1987.

== Career ==
=== Political career ===
Souza was first elected in 1998 by the Liberal Party. He later took leadership of the Social Christian Party. He was elected to the Legislative Assembly of Amazonas in 2000, and was re-elected in 2002. In 2003 he was made Parliamentary.

=== Broadcasting career ===
Souza began presenting Canal Livre in 1996. The program, which was described as "investigative journalism aimed at fighting crime and social injustice," ran until late 2008. Drawing large audiences, the program showed police raids and arrests, with presenters often following police chases in a helicopter. It was one of the most popular shows in Manaus.

== Criminal accusations ==
“The order to execute always came from the politician and his son, who then alerted the TV crews to get to the scene before the police.”

— Thomaz Vasconcelos, head of Amazonas Secretariat of Intelligence.

In 2009, Souza attracted international media attention when he was accused of hiring hitmen to kill five people to increase the ratings of his program. Suspicions were raised because he was frequently first to the scene of a crime, gathering graphic footage of the victims. A former police officer, Moacir Jorge da Costa, claimed he carried out one of the murders. Souza and his legal team denied Souza's involvement with the murders. Souza's son, Raphael, was arrested and is currently in prison facing charges of homicide, drug trafficking and illegal gun possession.

Weapons, ammunition and cash were discovered at Souza's home when the police conducted a search.

In October 2009, he was presented with charges of murder, drug-trafficking, intimidation of witnesses, illegal carrying of arms and formation of a criminal gang. He was also expelled from the state assembly. After an arrest warrant was issued, Souza disappeared and 60 civil and federal police began to search for him. Road blocks were mounted to try to stop him from leaving Manaus. He subsequently gave himself up to police on October 9, 2009. He repeatedly proclaimed his innocence. His brother, vice-mayor Carlos Souza, requested that when sent to prison he have his own cell and be separated from fellow inmates. Vanessa Lima, the former producer of the program, was arrested in December 2009.

== Death ==
Souza, who suffered from Budd–Chiari syndrome, died on 27 July 2010 of a heart attack. He died in a hospital in São Paulo, where he had been since March 2010.

== In media ==
=== Series ===
- 2018: Blood Pact, a crime drama television series released on Space loosely based on the real-life story of Wallace Souza.
- 2019: Killer Ratings, a Netflix documentary series focusing on Wallace Souza and Canal Livre.

== See also ==
- Vlado Taneski - Macedonian journalist who killed at least three women and wrote about the crimes
