= Undefeated (2011 film) =

- Theatrical release poster
- Directed by: Daniel Lindsay; T. J. Martin
- Produced by: Rich Middlemas; Glen Zipper; Daniel Lindsay; Seth Gordon; Ed Cunningham
- Edited by: Daniel Lindsay; T.J. Martin
- Music by: Michael Brook; Daniel McMahon; Miles Nielsen
- Production companies: Zipper Bros Films; Spitfire Pictures; Five Smooth Stones Productions; Level 22 Productions
- Distributed by: The Weinstein Company
- Release date: March 13, 2011 (SXSW)
- Running time: 113 minutes
- Country: United States
- Language: English
- Box office: $562,218

Undefeated is a 2011 American documentary film directed by Daniel Lindsay and T. J. Martin. The film documents the struggles of a high school football team, the Manassas Tigers of Memphis, as they attempt a winning season after years of losses. The team is turned around by coach Bill Courtney, who helps form a group of young men into an academic and athletic team.

== Production ==
Lindsay and Martin served as co-directors, cinematographers, sound recorders and editors, recording more than 500 hours of footage.

Sean "Diddy" Combs joined the film as an executive producer in early February, 2012, with plans to work with the Weinstein Co. on the remake.

== Reception ==
The film received critical acclaim at the South by Southwest conference in March 2011. The Weinstein Company was reported to have closed a seven-figure deal for distribution and remake rights to Undefeated.

The film holds a 96% approval rating on review aggregation website Rotten Tomatoes, based on 102 reviews with an average rating of 7.91/10. The website's critical consensus reads, "It covers familiar sports documentary territory, but Undefeated proves there are still powerful stories to be told on the high school gridiron." On Metacritic, the film has a weighted average score of 71 out of 100, based on 29 critics, indicating "generally favorable reviews".

== Accolades ==
On February 26, 2012, the movie won an Oscar for Best Documentary Feature.

== See also ==
- List of American football films
