= Ursula Macfarlane =

British film director

Ursula Macfarlane is a British film director known for her sensitive, character-driven documentary style and for combining intimate storytelling with broader social themes.

In 2007, Macfarlane and Saskia Wilson were nominated for a BAFTA for Breaking Up With The Joneses.

== Filmography ==
=== Director ===
| Year | Title | Type | Distributor / Platform | Festivals / Awards | Notes |
|---|---|---|---|---|---|
| 2006 | Breaking Up With The Joneses | Documentary | Channel 4 | BAFTA Television Craft nomination | Domestic feature documentary |
| 2015 | Charlie Hebdo: Three Days That Shook Paris | Drama-documentary / TV film | Channel 4 | – | Docu-drama on 2015 Paris attacks |
| 2016 | West Side Stories: The Making of a Classic | Documentary / TV film | BBC | – | Behind-the-scenes historical documentary |
| 2016 | Warwick Davis: The Seven Dwarfs of Auschwitz | Documentary / TV film | Channel 5 | – | Holocaust-related documentary |
| 2017 | One Deadly Weekend in America | Documentary | BBC Three / Netflix (selected regions) | – | Gun-violence themed documentary |
| 2019 | Untouchable | Feature documentary | Hulu | Sundance Film Festival premiere; multiple nominations | Harvey Weinstein documentary |
| 2021 | The Lost Sons | Feature documentary | CNN Films | – | True-crime/identity documentary |
| 2023 | Anna Nicole Smith: You Don’t Know Me | Feature documentary | Netflix | – | Biographical documentary |
| 2025 | My Brain: After the Rupture | Documentary | – | – | Upcoming / announced |

=== Producer ===
| Year | Title | Type | Role | Distributor / Platform | Notes |
|---|---|---|---|---|---|
| 2019 | Untouchable | Feature documentary | Co-producer | Hulu | Produced with Lightbox founders Simon Chinn and Jonathan Chinn |

=== Writer ===
| Year | Title | Type | Role | Notes |
|---|---|---|---|---|
| 2019 | Untouchable | Feature documentary | Story / structural writer | As director, contributed to narrative development and interviews |
