= Bill Courtney (American football) =

American football coach and businessman

William Bankhead Courtney Jr.
- Born: August 24, 1968 (age 58); Memphis, TN, United States
- Education: Bachelor of Arts
- Alma mater: University of Mississippi
- Occupations: Entrepreneur, football coach, motivational speaker
- Spouse: Lisa (née Matthews) (1992–present)
- Children: 4
- Writing career
- Period: 2001–present
- Notable work: Against The Grain
- Website: www.coachbillcourtney.com

Bill Courtney (born August 24, 1968) is an American football coach, and the CEO of Classic American Hardwoods, a lumber company headquartered in Memphis, Tennessee. He is the subject of the 2011 Academy Award-winning documentary, Undefeated, which chronicles his career as a high school football coach in the economically pressured area of Shelby County, Tennessee.

== Early life ==
Courtney was born in Memphis, Tennessee, on August 24, 1968, to William Bankhead Courtney Sr. and Linda Shubert Courtney. He grew up in a single-parent household, being raised by his mother.

He enrolled at the University of Mississippi in 1986 on a 4-year academic excellence scholarship. While in school he joined the Sigma Nu fraternity, and served as Lieutenant Commander. During his tenure, he helped found the Charity Bowl in 1989. He was also a member of two academic honorary organizations – Psi Chi for Psychology and Sigma Tau Delta for English. Bill also began writing in school, and was a feature writer for The Daily Mississippian. He later became a weekly columnist. As a student, he played with the Ole Miss soccer club for two years. At Ole Miss, Bill received the first annual Chi Omega Service Award for Outstanding Community Involvement. Bill graduated from The University of Mississippi in 1991 with a Bachelor of Arts in Psychology.

== Career ==
Courtney has a long history in the entrepreneurial community. He is the founder and CEO of Classic American Hardwoods since 2001. His company has manufacturing and domestic sales offices in Memphis with international sales offices in Shanghai, China and Ho Chi Minh City, Vietnam. He started his company after working with JT Shannon Lumber Company in Horn Lake, Mississippi, from 1996 to 2001 as Vice President. He also worked in automobile sales in Memphis, TN from 1994-1996.

== Coaching ==
He was the head football coach at Tipton Rosemark Academy in Rosemark, Tennessee, from 1991 to 1994. Through the years, he has volunteered as a football coach for several other teams.

== Undefeated ==
Undefeated is a documentary about a high school football team in Memphis, Tennessee. Filmmakers documented the lives of Bill Courtney and the Manassas Tigers. On February 26, 2012, the movie won the 2011 Academy Award for Best Documentary Feature.

== Publications ==
Courtney’s first book, Against the Grain: A Coach's Wisdom on Character, Faith, Family, and Love, was released by Weinstein Books on May 13, 2014. Against The Grain teaches the importance of strong character, grace, and other lessons using 14 principle tenets throughout the book. Former NBA Coach and president of the New York Knicks, Phil Jackson, wrote the foreword. Yahoo Sports said that Against The Grain was “a smooth read, fit for a range of readers from high school students needing a kick in the pants to executives needing a bit of direction and focus in their lives.” During publication week, Courtney appeared on several well-known national American morning shows and nationwide radio shows. Bill Courtney and Against The Grain received an outpouring of support from industry leaders including, Jeanie Buss, John Feinstein, and Sean Combs.

During publication week, Courtney was a part of a live webcast with Seattle Seahawks head coach, Pete Carroll for a discussion moderated by Yogi Roth. This live webcast was the first on-air interview with Pete Carroll since their 2014 Super Bowl win. During the webcast, Roth moderated a discussion with Carroll and Courtney on leadership and success. Courtney’s book was discussed throughout the event.

Promotion of Against The Grain was scheduled to continue through summer 2014 at various book signings throughout the United States.

== Awards and recognition ==
Courtney has been recognized by several of his peers because of his work with Classic American Hardwoods. In 2007, he received the Memphis Small Business of the Year from The Memphis Business Journal. He also received the Carnival Memphis King’s award for outstanding achievements in business and industry in 2012. In 2013, he was inducted into the Society of Entrepreneurs.

His work as a community leader has also been recognized on large platforms. He was inducted into the Bridge Builders for leadership in diversity, community, and justice in 2011. In 2012, he was honored with the Liberty Bowl’s Spirit of 1776 Award for Distinguished Citizenship. In 2012, he received the National Football Foundation and College Football Hall of Fame – Memphis Chapter’s award for the Distinguished American for Contribution to Amateur Athletics.

Courtney was the subject of the documentary, Undefeated, which won the Academy Award for Best Documentary Film in 2011.

== Personal life ==
Courtney is the cofounder of Man Rise, an organization that gives financial support to help five city schools with their football programs. He is the former board member of Orphanos Foundation, and also supports St. Jude Children’s Research Hospital.

Bill met Lisa Matthews in 1991. They were introduced by her Aunt, Susan Heider, a fellow employee at the time of Rosemark Academy. They married in 1992. They have four children. Courtney and his family reside in Memphis, Tennessee.
