= Simon Chinn =

British film producer

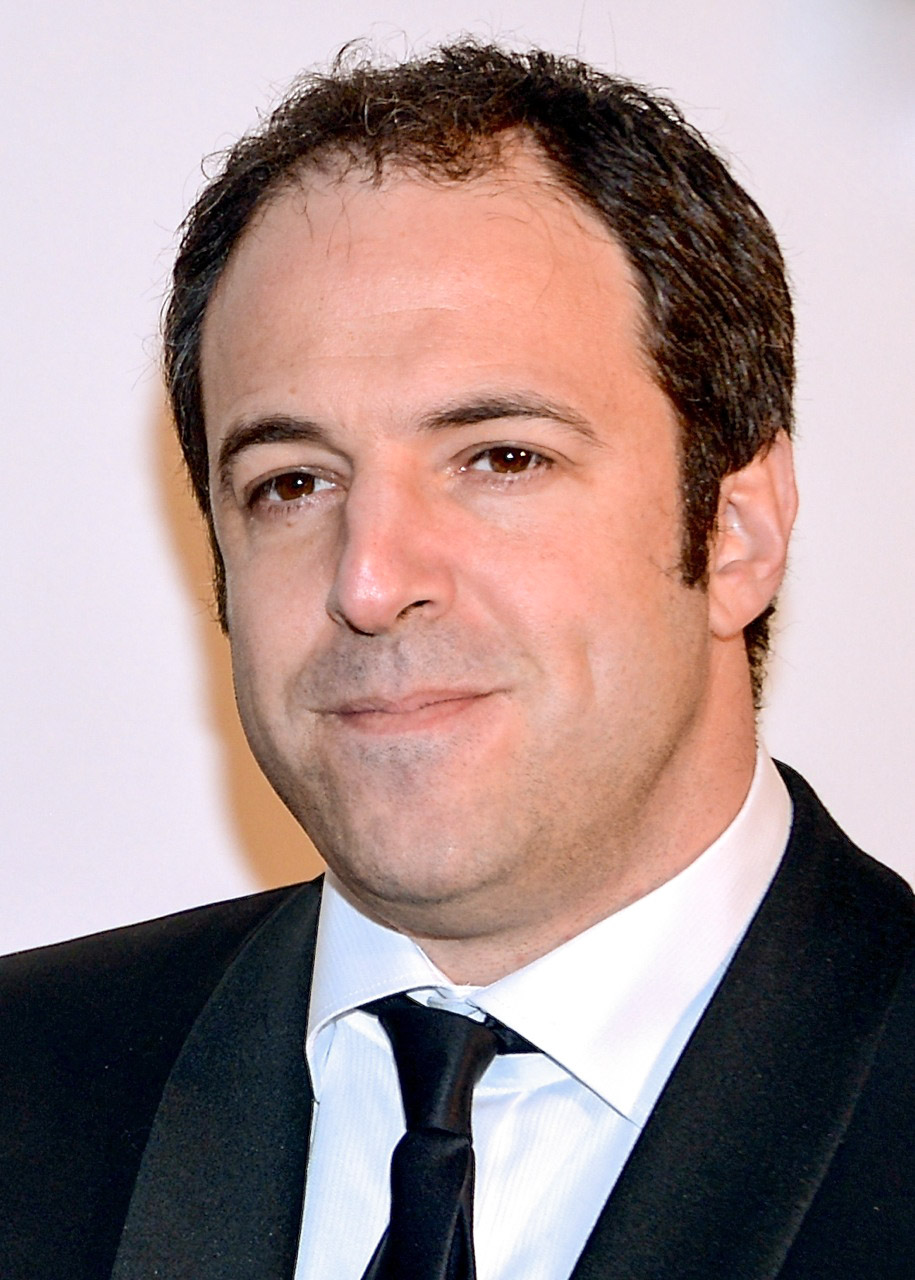
- Chinn in 2013
- Occupation: Film producer
- Notable work: Searching for Sugar Man; Man On Wire
- Father: Trevor Chinn

Simon Chinn is a British film producer, founder of Red Box Films and co-founder of Lightbox. He produced a number of feature documentaries, including Man on Wire and Searching for Sugar Man, both winners of the Academy Award for Best Documentary Feature Film.

He went to school with Louis Theroux and he produced the documentary My Scientology Movie written by Theroux. Chinn's cousin, Jonathan Chinn, is a television producer.

== Filmography ==
- The Mission (2023) - Producer
- Curse of the Chippendales (2021) – Executive Producer
- Tina (2021) – Producer
- Torn – Producer
- Tell Me Who I Am (2019) - Producer
- The Amazing Johnathan Documentary (2019) – Executive Producer
- LA 92 (2017) – Producer
- Captive (2016) (TV series) – Executive Producer
- My Scientology Movie (2015) – Producer
- The Green Prince (2014) – Producer
- The Legend of Shorty (2014) – Producer
- Garnet's Gold (2014) – Producer
- Signal To Noise (2014) (TV series) – Executive Producer, 1 Episode
- Everything or Nothing (2012) – Producer
- The Imposter (2012) – Executive Producer
- Searching for Sugar Man (2012) – Producer
- Project Nim (2011) – Producer
- Man on Wire (2008) – Producer
- To Be First (2007) – Producer
- The Government Inspector (2005) – Co-Producer
- America Beyond the Color Line with Henry Louis Gates Jr. (2002) (TV series) – Series Producer
- Frontline (2004) (TV Series) – Cinematographer, Episode The Invasion of Iraq
- Smallpox 2002: Silent Weapon (2002) – Writer, Producer
- War In Europe (2000) – Associate Producer
- On Air (1998) (TV series) – Executive Producer
- The Feel Good Factor (1997) (TV series) – Associate Producer
