= Baillie Gifford Prize =

Non-fiction writing award

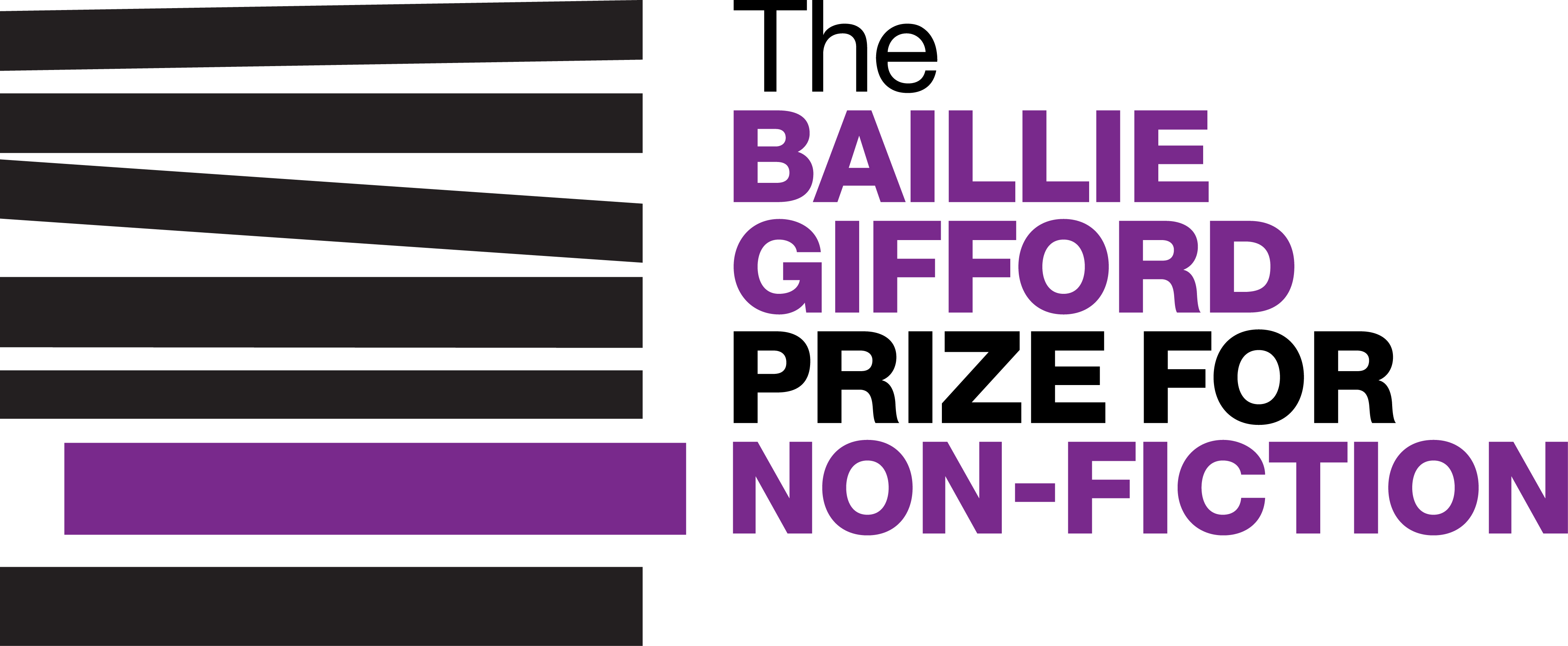
- Awarded for: Non-fiction writing
- Sponsored by: Baillie Gifford
- Date: 1999; 27 years ago
- Country: United Kingdom
- Formerly called: Samuel Johnson Prize
- Reward: £50,000
- Currently held by: How to End a Story: Collected Diaries by Helen Garner
- Website: thebailliegiffordprize.co.uk

The Baillie Gifford Prize for Non-Fiction, formerly the Samuel Johnson Prize, is an annual British book prize for the best non-fiction writing in the English language. It was founded in 1999 following the demise of the NCR Book Award. With its motto "All the best stories are true", the prize covers current affairs, history, politics, science, sport, travel, biography, autobiography and the arts. The competition is open to authors of any nationality whose work is published in the UK in English. The longlist, shortlist and winner is chosen by a panel of independent judges, which changes every year. Formerly named after English author and lexicographer Samuel Johnson, the award was renamed in 2015 after Baillie Gifford, an investment management firm and the primary sponsor. Since 2016, the annual dinner and awards ceremony has been sponsored by the Blavatnik Family Foundation.

The prize is governed by the Board of Directors of The Samuel Johnson Prize for Non-fiction Limited, a not-for-profit company. Since 2018, the Chair of the Board has been Sir Peter Bazalgette, who succeeded Stuart Proffitt, the chair since 1999. In 2015, Toby Mundy was appointed as the Prize's first director.

== History ==
Prior to the establishment of the Samuel Johnson Prize, Britain's premier literary award for non-fiction was the NCR Book Award, which had been established in 1987. In 1997, the NCR Award experienced a scandal when it was revealed the judges, many of them chosen for their popularity rather than literary qualities, had used "ghost readers" and were not expected to read the books they voted on. Because of this and other problems the award ceased operations. In response, one of the previous winners of NCR Award, the historian Peter Hennessy, approached Stuart Proffitt, a Publishing Director at Penguin Press, with the idea for a new award. An anonymous benefactor was found who funded the establishment of the Prize, which was named after the English 18th-century author and lexicographer Samuel Johnson.

From its inception until 2001, the prize was independently financed by the founding benefactor. In 2002, it was taken over by the BBC and re-named the BBC Four Samuel Johnson Prize and managed by BBC Four. In 2009, the name was amended to the BBC Samuel Johnson Prize for Non-Fiction and managed by BBC Two. The new name reflected the BBC's commitment to broadcasting coverage of the Prize on the BBC2 programme, The Culture Show. In 2016, the name was changed to the Baillie Gifford Prize for Non-Fiction, after its new primary sponsor, the Edinburgh-based investment management company Baillie Gifford.

Prior to the 2009 name change, the winner received £30,000, and each finalist received £2,500. After 2009, the award was £20,000 for the winner, and each finalist received £1,000. In February 2012, the steering committee for the prize announced that a new sponsor had been found for the prize, an anonymous philanthropist, enabling the prize money to be raised to £25,000. In 2015, funding for the prize was arranged by the Blavatnik Family Foundation, while the organisers sought new primary sponsors from 2016 onwards.

In 2016, under new sponsors Baillie Gifford, the prize money was restored to £30,000 for the winner.

In 2019, following the announcement that Baillie Gifford will sponsor the award until at least 2026, the prize money was increased to £50,000.

It is widely recognised as the UK's most prestigious award for non-fiction authors.

== Winners and shortlists ==
=== 1990s ===
1990s Samuel Johnson Prize winners and shortlists
Year	Author	Title	Result	Ref.
1999 (Note: The 1999 judges were Cherie Booth, Orlando Figes, Kate Summerscale, James Naughtie.)	Antony Beevor	Stalingrad	Won	
1999	Ian Kershaw	Hitler 1889–1936: Hubris (about Adolf Hitler)	Shortlisted	
1999	Ann Wroe	Pilate: The Biography of an Invented Man (about Pontius Pilate)	Shortlisted	
1999	John Diamond	C: Because Cowards Get Cancer Too	Shortlisted	
1999	Richard Holmes	Coleridge: Darker Reflections (about Samuel Taylor Coleridge)	Shortlisted	
1999	David Landes	The Wealth and Poverty of Nations	Shortlisted	

=== 2000s ===
2000s Samuel Johnson Prize winners and shortlists
Year	Author	Title	Result	Ref.
2000 (Note: The 2000 judges were Stephen Fry, Timothy Garton Ash, Susan Greenfield, Baroness Helena Kennedy, Nigella Lawson.)	David Cairns	Berlioz: Volume 2	Won	
2000	Tony Hawks	Playing the Moldovans at Tennis	Shortlisted	
2000	Brenda Maddox	Yeats's Ghosts: The Secret Life of W. B. Yeats (about W. B. Yeats)	Shortlisted	
2000	Matt Ridley	Genome: The Autobiography of a Species in 23 Chapters	Shortlisted	
2000	William Shawcross	Deliver us from Evil: Warlords, Peacekeepers and a World of Endless Conflict	Shortlisted	
2000	Francis Wheen	Karl Marx (about Karl Marx)	Shortlisted	
2001 (Note: The 2001 judges were Niall Ferguson, Steve Jones, Annalena McAfee, Suzanna Taverne, Andrew Marr.)	Michael Burleigh	The Third Reich: A New History	Won	
2001	Richard Fortey	Trilobite!: Eyewitness to Evolution	Shortlisted	
2001	Catherine Merridale	Night of Stone: Death and Memory in Russia	Shortlisted	
2001	Graham Robb	Rimbaud (about Arthur Rimbaud)	Shortlisted	
2001	Simon Sebag Montefiore	Prince of Princes: The Life of Potemkin (about Grigory Potemkin)	Shortlisted	
2001	Robert Skidelsky	John Maynard Keynes: Fighting for Britain, 1937–1946 (about John Maynard Keynes)	Shortlisted	
2002 (Note: 2002 was the first year as BBC Four Samuel Johnson Prize. The 2002 judges were Richard Fortey, Caroline Gascoigne, Bonnie Greer, Robert Harris, David Dimbleby.)	Margaret MacMillan	Peacemakers: The Paris Peace Conference of 1919 and Its Attempt to End War	Won	
2002	Eamon Duffy	The Voices of Morebath: Reformation and Rebellion in an English Village	Shortlisted	
2002	William Fiennes	The Snow Geese	Shortlisted	
2002	Richard Hamblyn	The Invention of Clouds: How an Amateur Meteorologist Forged the Language of the Skies	Shortlisted	
2002	Roy Jenkins	Churchill: a Biography (about Winston Churchill)	Shortlisted	
2002	Brendan Simms	Unfinest Hour: Britain and the Destruction of Bosnia	Shortlisted	
2003 (Note: The 2003 judges were Michael Portillo, Tim Radford, Andrew Roberts, Fiammetta Rocco, Rosie Boycott.)	T. J. Binyon	Pushkin: A Biography (about Alexander Pushkin)	Won	
2003	Orlando Figes	Natasha's Dance: A Cultural History of Russia	Shortlisted	
2003	Aminatta Forna	The Devil that Danced on the Water: A Daughter's Memoir of her Father, her Family, her Country and a Continent	Shortlisted	
2003	Olivia Judson	Dr Tatiana's Sex Advice to All Creation: The Definitive Guide to the Evolutionary Biology of Sex	Shortlisted	
2003	Claire Tomalin	Samuel Pepys: The Unequalled Self	Shortlisted	
2003	Edgar Vincent	Nelson: Love and Fame (about Lord Nelson)	Shortlisted	
2004 (Note: The 2004 judges were Aminatta Forna, Martha Kearney, Simon Singh, Francis Wheen, Michael Wood.)	Anna Funder	Stasiland: Stories from Behind the Berlin Wall	Won	
2004	Anne Applebaum	Gulag: A History of the Soviet Camps	Shortlisted	
2004	Jonathan Bate	John Clare: A Biography (about John Clare)	Shortlisted	
2004	Bill Bryson	A Short History of Nearly Everything	Shortlisted	
2004	Aidan Hartley	The Zanzibar Chest: A Memoir of Love and War	Shortlisted	
2004	Tom Holland	Rubicon: The Last Years of the Roman Republic	Shortlisted	
2005 (Note: The 2005 judges were Marcus du Sautoy, Andrew Holgate, Maria Misra, John Simpson, Sue MacGregor.)	Jonathan Coe	Like a Fiery Elephant: The Story of B. S. Johnson (about B. S. Johnson)	Won	
2005	Alexander Masters	Stuart: A Life Backwards	Shortlisted	
2005	Suketu Mehta	Maximum City: Bombay Lost and Found	Shortlisted	
2005	Orhan Pamuk	Istanbul: Memories and the City	Shortlisted	
2005	Hilary Spurling	Matisse the Master: The Conquest of Colour 1909–1954 (about Henri Matisse)	Shortlisted	
2005	Sarah Wise	The Italian Boy: Murder and Grave-Robbery in 1830s London	Shortlisted	
2006 (Note: The 2006 judges were Robert Winston, Sir Richard Eyre, Pankaj Mishra, Cristina Odone, Michael Prodger.)	James S. Shapiro	1599: A Year in the Life of William Shakespeare	Won	
2006	Alan Bennett	Untold Stories	Shortlisted	
2006	Jerry Brotton	The Sale of the Late King's Goods: Charles I and His Art Collection	Shortlisted	
2006	Carmen Callil	Bad Faith: A Forgotten History of Family & Fatherland	Shortlisted	
2006	Tony Judt	Postwar: A History of Europe Since 1945	Shortlisted	
2006	Tom Reiss	The Orientalist: In Search of a Man Caught Between East and West	Shortlisted	
2007 (Note: The 2007 judges were Helena Kennedy, Diana Athill, Jim Al-Khalili, Tristram Hunt, Mark Lawson.)	Rajiv Chandrasekaran	Imperial Life in the Emerald City: Inside Iraq's Green Zone	Won	
2007	Ian Buruma	Murder in Amsterdam: The Death of Theo Van Gogh and the Limits of Tolerance	Shortlisted	
2007	Peter Hennessy	Having It So Good: Britain in the Fifties	Shortlisted	
2007	Georgina Howell	Daughter of the Desert: The Extraordinary Life of Gertrude Bell (about Gertrude Bell)	Shortlisted	
2007	Dominic Streatfeild	Brainwash: The Secret History of Mind Control	Shortlisted	
2007	Adrian Tinniswood	The Verneys: A True Story of Love, War, and Madness in Seventeenth-Century England	Shortlisted	
2008 (Note: The 2008 judges were Claire Armitstead, Daljit Nagra, Chris Rapley, Hannah Rothschild, Rosie Boycott.)	Kate Summerscale	The Suspicions of Mr Whicher or the Murder at Road Hill House	Won	
2008	Tim Butcher	Blood River: A Journey to Africa's Broken Heart	Shortlisted	
2008	Mark Cocker	Crow Country	Shortlisted	
2008	Orlando Figes	The Whisperers: Private Life in Stalin's Russia	Shortlisted	
2008	Patrick French	The World Is What It Is: The Authorised Biography of VS Naipaul (about V. S. Naipaul)	Shortlisted	
2008	Alex Ross	The Rest is Noise: Listening to the Twentieth Century	Shortlisted	
2009 (Note: 2009 was the first year as BBC Samuel Johnson Prize for Non-Fiction. The judges announced the winner of the prize at an awards event at King's Place, London on 30 June. The monetary prize for 2009 was £20,000 for the winner, and each finalist receives £1000. The 2009 judges were Mark Lythgoe, Tim Marlow, Munira Mirza, Sarah Sands, Jacob Weisberg.)	Philip Hoare	Leviathan or, The Whale	Won	
2009	Liaquat Ahamed	Lords of Finance: The Bankers Who Broke the World	Shortlisted	
2009	Ben Goldacre	Bad Science	Shortlisted	
2009	David Grann	The Lost City of Z: A Tale of Deadly Obsession in the Amazon	Shortlisted	
2009	Richard Holmes	The Age of Wonder: How the Romantic Generation Discovered the Beauty and Terror of Science	Shortlisted	
2009	Manjit Kumar	Quantum: Einstein, Bohr and the Great Debate about the Nature of Reality	Shortlisted	

=== 2010s ===
2010s Baillie Gifford Prize winner and shortlist
Year	Author	Title	Result	Ref.
2010 (Note: The 2010 judges were Evan Davis, Jan Dalley, Daniel Finkelstein, Roger Highfield, Stella Tillyard.)	Barbara Demick	Nothing to Envy: Ordinary Lives in North Korea	Won	
2010	Alex Bellos	Alex's Adventures in Numberland: Dispatches from the Wonderful World of Mathematics	Shortlisted	
2010	Luke Jennings	Blood Knots: On Fathers, Friendship and Fishing	Shortlisted	
2010	Andrew Ross Sorkin	Too Big to Fail: The Inside Story of How Wall Street and Washington Fought to Save the Financial System—and Themselves	Shortlisted	
2010	Jenny Uglow	A Gambling Man: Charles II and the Restoration	Shortlisted	
2010	Richard Wrangham	Catching Fire: How Cooking Made Us Human	Shortlisted	
2011 (Note: The 2011 judges were David Goodhart, Sam Leith, Ben Macintyre, Brenda Maddox, Amanda Vickery.)	Frank Dikötter	Mao's Great Famine: The History of China's Most Devastating Catastrophe, 1958–1962	Won	
2011	Andrew Graham-Dixon	Caravaggio: A Life Sacred and Profane (biography of Caravaggio)	Shortlisted	
2011	Maya Jasanoff	Liberty's Exiles: American Loyalists in the Revolutionary World	Shortlisted	
2011	Matt Ridley	The Rational Optimist: How Prosperity Evolves	Shortlisted	
2011	Jonathan Steinberg	Bismarck: A Life (biography of Otto von Bismarck)	Shortlisted	
2011	John Stubbs	Reprobates: The Cavaliers of the English Civil War	Shortlisted	
2012 (Note: The 2012 judges were David Willetts, Patrick French, Paul Laity, Bronwen Maddox, Raymond Tallis. The 2012 monetary prize was £20,000 for the winner.)	Wade Davis	Into the Silence: The Great War, Mallory and the Conquest of Everest	Won	
2012	Katherine Boo	Behind the Beautiful Forevers: Life, Death and Hope in a Mumbai Slum	Shortlisted	
2012	Robert Macfarlane	The Old Ways: A Journey on Foot	Shortlisted	
2012	Steven Pinker	The Better Angels of our Nature: A History of Violence and Humanity	Shortlisted	
2012	Paul Preston	The Spanish Holocaust: Inquisition and Extermination in Twentieth-Century Spain	Shortlisted	
2012	Sue Prideaux	Strindberg: A Life (about August Strindberg)	Shortlisted	
2013 (Note: The 2013 judging panel was chaired by cosmologist and Astronomer Royal, Martin Rees, Baron Rees of Ludlow, accompanied by classical historian Mary Beard, director of Liberty Shami Chakrabarti, historian Peter Hennessy and writer and critic James McConnachie.)	Lucy Hughes-Hallett	The Pike: Gabriele D'Annunzio, Poet, Seducer and Preacher of War	Won	
2013	David Crane	Empires of the Dead: How One Man's Vision led to the Creation of WWI's World Graves	Shortlisted	
2013	William Dalrymple	Return of a King: The Battle for Afghanistan	Shortlisted	
2013	Dave Goulson	A Sting in the Tale: My Adventures with Bumblebees	Shortlisted	
2013	Charlotte Higgins	Under Another Sky: Journeys in Roman Britain	Shortlisted	
2013	Charles Moore	Margaret Thatcher: The Authorised Biography	Shortlisted	
2014 (Note: The 2014 judging panel was chaired by author and historian Claire Tomalin, accompanied by Alan Johnson MP, Financial Times Books Editor Lorien Kite, philosopher Ray Monk and historian Ruth Scurr.)	Helen Macdonald	H Is for Hawk	Won	
2014	John Campbell	Roy Jenkins: A Biography (about Roy Jenkins)	Shortlisted	
2014	Marion Coutts	The Iceberg: A Memoir	Shortlisted	
2014	Greg Grandin	The Empire of Necessity: Slavery, Freedom, and Deception in the New World	Shortlisted	
2014	Alison Light	Common People: The History of an English Family	Shortlisted	
2014	Caroline Moorehead	Village of Secrets: Defying the Nazis in Vichy France	Shortlisted	
2015 (Note: The 2015 judging panel was chaired by Pulitzer prize-winning historian and journalist Anne Applebaum, together with editor of Intelligent Life Emma Duncan, editor of New Scientist Sumit Paul-Choudhury, Director of China Centre at Oxford University Professor Rana Mitter and former Controller of Film and Drama and Head of Film 4 Tessa Ross.)	Steve Silberman	NeuroTribes: The Legacy of Autism and How to Think Smarter About People Who Think Differently	Won	
2015	Jonathan Bate	Ted Hughes: The Unauthorised Life (about Ted Hughes)	Shortlisted	
2015	Robert Macfarlane	Landmarks	Shortlisted	
2015	Laurence Scott	The Four-Dimensional Human: Ways of Being in the Digital World	Shortlisted	
2015	Emma Sky	The Unravelling: High Hopes and Missed Opportunities in Iraq	Shortlisted	
2015	Samanth Subramanian	This Divided Island: Stories from the Sri Lankan Civil War	Shortlisted	
2016 (Note: 2016 was the first year as Baillie Gifford Prize. The 2016 judging panel was chaired by former BBC Economics Editor Stephanie Flanders, together with Philip Ball, science writer and author; Jonathan Derbyshire, executive comment editor of the Financial Times; Dr Sophie Ratcliffe, scholar, writer and literary critic and Rohan Silva, co-founder of the social enterprise Second Home.)	Philippe Sands	East West Street: On the Origins of Genocide and Crimes Against Humanity	Won	
2016	Svetlana Alexievich	Secondhand Time: The Last of the Soviets	Shortlisted	
2016	Margo Jefferson	Negroland: A Memoir	Shortlisted	
2016	Hisham Matar	The Return: Fathers, Sons and the Land in Between	Shortlisted	
2017 (Note: The 2017 judging panel was chaired by chaired by author and Chairman of ITV Sir Peter Bazalgette, together with Anjana Ahuja, science writer; Ian Bostridge, tenor and writer; Professor Sarah Churchwell, academic and writer and Razia Iqbal, journalist and broadcaster.)	David France	How to Survive a Plague: The Inside Story of How Citizens and Science Tamed AIDS	Won	
2017	Christopher de Bellaigue	The Islamic Enlightenment The Modern Struggle Between Faith and Reason	Shortlisted	
2017	Kapka Kassabova	Border: A Journey to the Edge of Europe	Shortlisted	
2017	Daniel Mendelsohn	An Odyssey: A Father, a Son and an Epic	Shortlisted	
2017	Mark O'Connell	To Be a Machine: Adventures Among Cyborgs, Utopians, Hackers, and the Futurists Solving the Modest Problem of Death	Shortlisted	
2017	Simon Schama	Belonging: The Story of the Jews, 1492–1900	Shortlisted	
2018 (Note: The 2018 judging panel was chaired by The Economist's culture correspondent Fiammetta Rocco, with Stephen Bush, journalist and political commentator; Susan Brigden, historian; Anne-Marie Imafidon, mathematician and campaigner; and Nigel Warburton, philosopher.)	Serhii Plokhy	Chernobyl: History of a Tragedy	Won	
2018	Hannah Fry	Hello World: How to Be Human in the Age of the Machine	Shortlisted	
2018	Ben Macintyre	The Spy and the Traitor: The Greatest Espionage Story of the Cold War	Shortlisted	
2018	Thomas Page McBee	Amateur: A True Story About What Makes a Man	Shortlisted	
2018	Stephen R. Platt	Imperial Twilight: The Opium War and the End of China's Last Golden Age	Shortlisted	
2018	Carl Zimmer	She Has Her Mother's Laugh: The Powers, Perversions and Potential of Heredity	Shortlisted	
2019 (Note: The 2019 judging panel was chaired by Times Literary Supplement editor Stig Abell, with Myriam François, TV producer and writer; Robert Douglas-Fairhurst, professor of English Literature; Frances Wilson, critic and biographer; Petina Gappah, writer and lawyer and Alexander Van Tulleken, doctor and TV presenter.)	Hallie Rubenhold	The Five: The Untold Lives of the Women Killed by Jack the Ripper	Won	
2019	Casey Cep	Furious Hours: Murder, Fraud and the Last Trial of Harper Lee	Shortlisted	
2019	Laura Cumming	On Chapel Sands: My Mother and Other Missing Persons	Shortlisted	
2019	William Feaver	The Lives of Lucian Freud: Youth (about Lucian Freud)	Shortlisted	
2019	Julia Lovell	Maoism: A Global History	Shortlisted	
2019	Azadeh Moaveni	Guest House for Young Widows: Among the Women of ISIS	Shortlisted	

=== 2020s ===
2020s Baillie Gifford Prize winner and shortlist
Year	Author	Title	Result	Ref.
2020 (Note: The 2020 judging panel consisted of Martha Kearney (BBC Radio presenter), Shahidha Bari (writer and radio presenter), Simon Ings (writer and editor), Leo Robson (writer), Max Strasser (editor) and Bee Wilson (journalist and writer).)	Craig Brown	One Two Three Four: The Beatles in Time	Won	
2020	Matthew Cobb	The Idea of the Brain: A History	Shortlisted	
2020	Sudhir Hazareesingh	Black Spartacus: The Epic Life of Toussaint Louverture	Shortlisted	
2020	Christina Lamb	Our Bodies, Their Battlefield: What War Does to Women	Shortlisted	
2020	Amy Stanley	Stranger in the Shogun's City: A Japanese Woman and Her World	Shortlisted	
2020	Kate Summerscale	The Haunting of Alma Fielding: A True Ghost Story	Shortlisted	
2021 (Note: The 2021 judging panel consisted of Andrew Holgate, Sara Collins, Helen Czerski, Kathryn Hughes, Johny Pitts and Dominic Sandbrook.)	Patrick Radden Keefe	Empire of Pain: The Secret History of the Sackler Dynasty	Won	
2021	Cal Flyn	Islands of Abandonment: Life in the Post-Human Landscape	Shortlisted	
2021	Harald Jähner	Aftermath: Life in the Fallout of the Third Reich, 1945–1955	Shortlisted	
2021	Kei Miller	Things I Have Withheld	Shortlisted	
2021	John Preston	Fall: The Mystery of Robert Maxwell (about Robert Maxwell)	Shortlisted	
2021	Lea Ypi	Free: Coming of Age at the End of History	Shortlisted	
2022 (Note: The 2022 judges were Caroline Sanderson (chair), Laura Spinney, Rachel Cooke, Clive Myrie, Samanth Subramanian and Georgina Godwin)	Katherine Rundell	Super-Infinite: The Transformations of John Donne (about John Donne)	Won	
2022	Caroline Elkins	Legacy of Violence: A History of the British Empire	Shortlisted	
2022	Jonathan Freedland	The Escape Artist: The Man Who Broke Out of Auschwitz to Warn the World (about Rudolf Vrba)	Shortlisted	
2022	Sally Hayden	My Fourth Time, We Drowned: Seeking Refuge on the World's Deadliest Migration Route	Shortlisted	
2022	Anna Keay	The Restless Republic: Britain Without a Crown	Shortlisted	
2022	Polly Morland	A Fortunate Woman: A Country Doctor’s Story	Shortlisted	
2023 (Note: The 2023 judges were Arifa Akbar, Andrew Haldane, Tanjil Rashid, Ruth Scurr, and Frederick Studemann (chair))	John Vaillant	Fire Weather: A True Story from a Hotter World	Won	
2023	Hannah Barnes	Time to Think: The Inside Story of the Collapse of the Tavistock's Gender Service for Children	Shortlisted	
2023	Tania Branigan	Red Memory: Living, Remembering and Forgetting China's Cultural Revolution,	Shortlisted	
2023	Christopher Clark	Revolutionary Spring: Fighting for a New World 1848–1849	Shortlisted	
2023	Jeremy Eichler	Time's Echo: The Second World War, The Holocaust, and The Music of Remembrance	Shortlisted	
2023	Jennifer Homans	Mr. B: George Balanchine's Twentieth Century	Shortlisted	
2024 (Note: The 2024 judges were Heather Brooke, Alison Flood, Peter Hoskin, Tomiwa Owolade, Chitra Ramaswamy, and Isabel Hilton (chair))	Richard Flanagan	Question 7	Won	
2024	Rachel Clarke	The Story of a Heart	Shortlisted	
2024	Annie Jacobsen	Nuclear War: A Scenario	Shortlisted	
2024	Viet Thanh Nguyen	A Man of Two Faces: A Memoir, a History, a Memorial	Shortlisted	
2024	Sue Prideaux	Wild Thing: A Life of Paul Gauguin	Shortlisted	
2024	David Van Reybrouck	Revolusi: Indonesia and the Birth of the Modern World	Shortlisted	
2025 (Note: The 2025 judges were Pratinav Anil, Inaya Folarin Iman, Lucy Hughes-Hallett, Rachel Lloyd, Peter Parker, and Robbie Millen (chair))	Helen Garner	How to End a Story: Collected Diaries	Won	
2025	Jason Burke	The Revolutionists: The Story of the Extremists Who Hijacked the 1970s	Shortlisted	
2025	Richard Holmes	The Boundless Deep: Young Tennyson, Science and the Crisis of Belief	Shortlisted	
2025	Justin Marozzi	Captives and Companions: A History of Slavery and the Slave Trade in the Islamic World	Shortlisted	
2025	Adam Weymouth	Lone Wolf: Walking the Faultlines of Europe	Shortlisted	
2025	Frances Wilson	Electric Spark: The Enigma of Muriel Spark	Shortlisted	
2026 (Note: The 2026 judges were: Kirsty Lang, Bea Carvalho, Tiffany Jenkins, Sam Leith, Ravi Mattu, Elif Shafak)	Edmund Richardson	Alexander: God, King, Man	Won	
2026	Nicholas Boggs	Baldwin: A Love Story	Shortlisted	
2026	Anand Gopal	Days of Love and Rage: A Story of Revolution	Shortlisted	
2026	Patrick Radden Keefe	London Falling: A Mysterious Death in a Gilded City and a Family’s Search for Truth	Shortlisted	
2026	Matthew Sweet	The Great Dictator: A Life of Barbara Cartland	Shortlisted	
2026	Andrea Wulf	The Traveller: The Revolutionary Life of George Forster and his Search for Humanity	Shortlisted	

=== 25th Anniversary Winner of Winners Award ===
In 2023, marking the 25th anniversary of the prize, a one-off 'Winner of Winners' Award was announced. The judging panel was chaired by Jason Cowley (New Statesman editor-in-chief) and included Shahidha Bari (academic, critic and broadcaster), Sarah Churchwell (journalist, author and academic), and Frances Wilson (biographer and critic).

Author	Title	Win Year	Result	Ref.
James S. Shapiro	1599: A Year in the Life of William Shakespeare	2006	Won	
Craig Brown	One Two Three Four: The Beatles in Time	2020	Shortlisted	
Wade Davis	Into the Silence: The Great War, Mallory and the Conquest of Everest	2012	Shortlisted	
Barbara Demick	Nothing to Envy: Ordinary Lives in North Korea	2010	Shortlisted	
Patrick Radden Keefe	Empire of Pain: The Secret History of the Sackler Dynasty	2021	Shortlisted	
Margaret MacMillan	Peacemakers: The Paris Peace Conference of 1919 and Its Attempt to End War	2002	Shortlisted	

== See also ==
- British literature
- English literature
- List of years in literature
- List of literary awards
- Prizes named after people
