= The Biggest Ideas in the Universe =

2022 book by Sean M. Carroll

The Biggest Ideas in the Universe: Space, Time, and Motion
- Hardcover edition
- Author: Sean M. Carroll
- Language: English
- Subject: Physics
- Genre: Nonfiction
- Publisher: Dutton
- Publication date: September 20, 2022
- Publication place: United States
- Media type: Print; e-book; audiobook
- Pages: 304 pp.
- ISBN: 978-0593186589
- Preceded by: Something Deeply Hidden
- Followed by: Quanta and Fields
- Website: Official website

The Biggest Ideas in the Universe: Space, Time, and Motion is a nonfiction book by American theoretical physicist Sean M. Carroll. The book, his sixth, was initially released on September 20, 2022, by Dutton.

== Synopsis ==
The book serves as a bridge between popular science and textbook physics, designed for readers with only a high school algebra background. Rather than relying on loose metaphors, Carroll introduces the actual mathematical tools—such as derivatives and integrals from calculus—and uses them to explain the core principles that govern reality, from conservation laws and Newtonian dynamics to the nature of space, time, and Einstein’s general relativity. The book builds through three sections, covering the “spherical cow” philosophy of simplifying complex systems, the merger of space and time into four-dimensional spacetime, and the warped geometry that produces gravity and black holes. By grounding every big idea in its underlying equations, Carroll aims to show that advanced physics is not an inaccessible mystery but a clear, logical, and deeply beautiful way of seeing the Universe.

== Reception ==
Julia M. Klein of Johns Hopkins Magazine wrote, "There's nothing small about Johns Hopkins physicist Sean Carroll's latest undertaking. The Biggest Ideas in the Universe: Space, Time, and Motion is the first volume in an ambitious trilogy that seeks to explain physics to a popular audience—one willing to grapple with the basics of calculus and other mathematical underpinnings of the field. This book focuses on classical mechanics, including Einstein's theory of relativity..." Kirkus Reviews commented, "The author is at his best with familiar concepts such as space. Once considered an empty container for the universe, it turns out to be a turbulent phenomenon with "a life of its own." Time is similar to space; it's part of how we locate ourselves, and we can measure it. But it's different because it seems to flow, invariably from the past to the future—although no law forbids the opposite. Gravity, energy, relativity, and the life of stars receive Carroll's enthusiastic attention, much as they did in such previous books as From Eternity to Here and Something Deeply Hidden. Despite the author's claims, however, some of the math will flummox readers. No-nonsense, not-dumbed-down explanations of basic laws of the universe that reward close attention."
