= This Divided Island =

2015 Indian Book about the Sri Lankan Conflict

This Divided Island: Life, Death, and the Sri Lankan War
- Author: Samanth Subramanian
- Language: English
- Publisher: Penguin Books
- Publication date: 2015
- Publication place: India
- ISBN: 9781250069740

This Divided Island: Life, Death, and the Sri Lankan War is a book by Indian author and journalist, Samanth Subramanian, written as a non fiction account of the Sri Lankan Civil War.

The book received positive coverage for its depiction of the sectarian conflict between the Sri Lankan state and the Sri Lankan Tamils. The book was nominated for the Samuel Johnson Prize and the Royal Society of Literature's Ondaatje Prize. Writing in The Guardian, William Dalrymple, called it a remarkable and moving portrayal of the agonies of the conflict that "will stand as a fine literary monument against the government’s attempt at imposed forgetfulness".

== See also ==
- Sri Lankan Civil War in popular culture
