= The Particle at the End of the Universe =

Book by Sean M. Carroll

- Hardcover edition
- Author: Sean M. Carroll
- Language: English
- Subject: Higgs boson
- Genre: Non-fiction
- Publisher: Dutton
- Publication date: November 13, 2012
- Publication place: United States
- Media type: Print, e-book, audiobook
- Pages: 352 pp.
- ISBN: 978-0525953593
- OCLC: 870166895
- Preceded by: From Eternity to Here
- Followed by: The Big Picture
- Website: Official website

The Particle at the End of the Universe: How the Hunt for the Higgs Boson Leads Us to the Edge of a New World is a non-fiction book by American theoretical physicist Sean M. Carroll. The book was initially released on November 13, 2012 by Dutton.

== Background ==
The book, Carroll's third, focuses on the global hunt for and discovery of the Higgs boson at the Large Hadron Collider at CERN. Carrol explained that the hunt is a tale of "money, politics, and jealousy" among scientists and nations seeking the prize. The Particle at the End of the Universe was the 2013 winner of the Royal Society Winton Prize for Science Books. The judges said, "This book allows you to imagine the unimaginable. It's the story of scientific discovery from start to end. It stands out as the best telling of an extraordinary tale, speaking to people who are not scientists." The text starts at the dramatic day of July 4, 2012, when the discovery of the boson was announced, then goes back in time to the ancient Greek philosophers who were the first ones to propose that all the matter in the Universe was composed of infinitesimal elemental pieces, and then concentrates on the global hunt for the mysterious particle that gives all others their mass.

== Reception ==
Manjit Kumar writing for The Independent stated, "Though not always easy reading, Carroll's book reveals that modern physics at the cutting edge requires extraordinary devotion and a willingness to bet high stakes in search of unique rewards. As he says, "When it all comes together, the world changes." Astrophysicist Adam Frank in his review for NPR stated, "The book succeeds by combining lucid descriptions of the triumphant physics behind the Higgs with a very human story of the search itself. As Carroll puts it, the search for the Higgs is not just a story of subatomic particles and esoteric ideas. It's also a tale of money, politics and jealousy. This book is more than a tour of big ideas and big events in physics. With wit and honesty, Carroll conveys why science's fundamental questions matter so much to human culture." David L. Ulin of the Los Angeles Times wrote, "This is as close as the book gets to metaphysics, but it's a stunning statement just the same. What he's suggesting, after all, is science as a form of heightened self-discovery, in which the universe we study is ourselves." Publishers Weekly's review stated, "Whether explaining complex physics like field theory and symmetry or the workings of particle accelerators, Carroll's clarity and unbridled enthusiasm reveal the pure excitement of discovery as much as they illuminate the facts."
