= Samanth Subramanian =

Indian writer and journalist

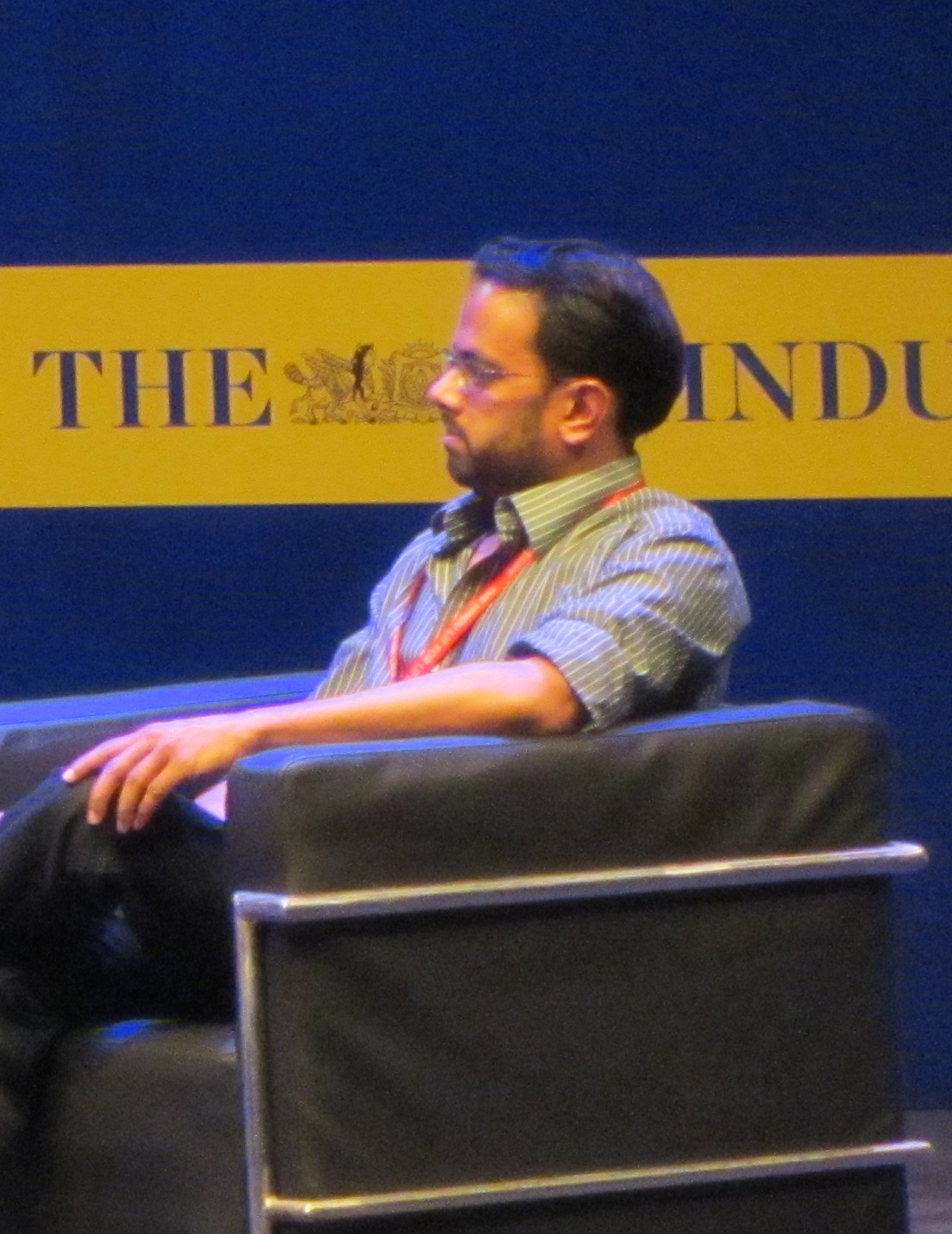
Subramanian at The Hindu's 2015 Lit for Life festival

Samanth Subramanian is an Indian writer and journalist based in London. He studied journalism at Penn State University and international relations at Columbia University. In 2018–19, he was a Leon Levy Fellow at the City University of New York. He contributes to The New Yorker, The New York Times, The Guardian and WIRED.

== Author ==
Subramanian's first book Following Fish|Following Fish: Travels Around the Indian Coast (2010, Penguin Books India) was a travelogue about Indian fisheries and seafood cuisine.

His second book This Divided Island: Stories from the Sri Lankan Civil War (2015, Atlantic Books, ISBN 978-0857895950) was nominated for the Samuel Johnson Prize and the Royal Society of Literature's Ondaatje Prize. He became only the second Indian writer after Suketu Mehta to be nominated for this prestigious award for literary non-fiction. William Dalrymple, writing in The Guardian, considered it a remarkable and moving portrayal of the agonies of the conflict that "will stand as a fine literary monument against the government’s attempt at imposed forgetfulness".

His third major work, A Dominant Character: The Radical Science and Restless Politics of J. B. S. Haldane (2019) is a biography of J. B. S. Haldane. The book has been selected as one of the 100 Notable Books of 2020 by The New York Times.

His articles cover a wide variety of subjects ranging from land reclamation in Singapore to Tamil pulp fiction.

He has written about the synthesis of new chemical elements for Bloomberg Businessweek.

In April 2024, in the run-up to India's general elections, Subramanian wrote a profile of Rahul Gandhi in The New York Times Magazine covering Gandhi's Bharat Jodo Yatra, Bharat Jodo Nyay Yatra, and other topics.

In November 2025, The Economist ranked Subramanian's book The Web Beneath The Waves: The Fragile Cables that Connect Our World as one of the "Best books of 2025".

== Books ==
- Following Fish: Travels Around the Indian Coast (Penguin Books India, 2010)
- This Divided Island: Stories from the Sri Lankan Civil War (Thomas Dunne Books, 2015)
- Balkrishna Doshi: Architecture for the People, author of chapter "A Modernism for India" (Vitra Design Museum, 2019)
- A Dominant Character: The Radical Science and Restless Politics of J. B. S. Haldane (W.W. Norton & Company, 2020)
- The Web Beneath The Waves: The Fragile Cables that Connect Our World (Columbia Global Reports, 2025)
