= Maria Misra =

Historian and academic

Professor Maria Misra
- Born: Anna-Maria Susheila Misra
- Occupations: Historian and academic
- Title: Professor of Global History

Academic background
- Education: Christ Church, Oxford
- Thesis: Entrepreneurial decline and the end of empire: British business in India, 1919-1949 (1992)
- Doctoral advisor: Tapan Raychaudhuri; Tom Tomlinson

Academic work
- Discipline: History
- Sub-discipline: Colonial India; Global history; Postcolonialism; Intellectual history; Gender history
- Institutions: University of Birmingham; Coventry Polytechnic; Keble College, Oxford

Anna-Maria Susheila Misra is Professor of Global History at the University of Oxford and a Fellow of Keble College, specialising in the politics, culture, and economics of nineteenth- and twentieth-century imperialism and colonialism.

== Early life and education ==
Misra is half-Indian, coming from a family of Brahmins, and spent many of her childhood holidays visiting relatives there.

Misra matriculated as a student of Christ Church, Oxford in 1982, originally reading English before changing to Philosophy, Politics and Economics.

Misra's doctoral thesis examined relations between British and Indian businessmen during the colonial period and was supervised by Tapan Raychaudhuri and Tom Tomlinson.

== Academic career ==
Misra joined Keble College as Associate Professor of Modern History in 1996. She had previously taught at the University of Birmingham and Coventry Polytechnic. She was awarded a Title of Distinction as Professor of Global History by the University of Oxford in November 2020.

She has written two books on Indian history: Business, Race and Politics in British India and Vishnu's Crowded Temple, India since the Great Rebellion. The latter, published by Allen Lane to be timed with India's 60 years of independence, addresses the question of how India's traditions of caste and religious identities are able to coexist with a modern democratic state on its way to becoming a major economic power.

== Media work ==
She has presented a television documentary series on eighteenth- and nineteenth-century India which was broadcast in 2001, has written for the New Statesman, The Guardian, The Times and The Financial Times and has contributed to the Saturday Review on BBC Radio 4. She is a columnist for the Times Higher Education Supplement. Misra has appeared as an expert commentator in three episodes of the Radio 4 discussion series In Our Time: Imperial science (2001), the British Empire (2001) and the East India Company (2003).

In 2005, Misra was on the judging panel of the Baillie Gifford Prize for Non-Fiction.

== Publications ==
- "Politics and Expatriate Enterprise in India: The Inter-War Years" in Business and Politics in India: A Historical Perspective (ed. D.Tripathi), (New Delhi, 1991)
- Business, Race and Politics in British India c.1860-1960. (Oxford, 1999) 250pp.
- "Gentlemanly Capitalism and the Raj: British Policy in India, c. 1860-1947" in Gentlemanly Capitalism and British Imperialism: The New Debate of Empire (ed. R.E. Dumett), (Basingstoke, 1999) pp 157–174
- "Business Culture and Entrepreneurship in British India, 1860-1950", Modern Asian Studies 34:2 (2000) pp 333–348
