= Quantum (book) =

Book by Manjit Kumar

- Author: Manjit Kumar
- Cover artist: Gavin Morris
- Language: English
- Genre: Science history
- Publisher: Icon Books in UK & Commonwealth nations W. W. Norton & Company in United States Hachette India in India
- Publication date: October 16, 2008
- Publication place: United Kingdom
- Media type: Print (hardcover & paperback), audio player
- Pages: 448 pp
- ISBN: 978-93-80143-10-1 (Indian edition)
- Dewey Decimal: 530.12

Quantum: Einstein, Bohr, and the Great Debate About the Nature of Reality is a science history book written by Manjit Kumar. It was released on October 16, 2008.

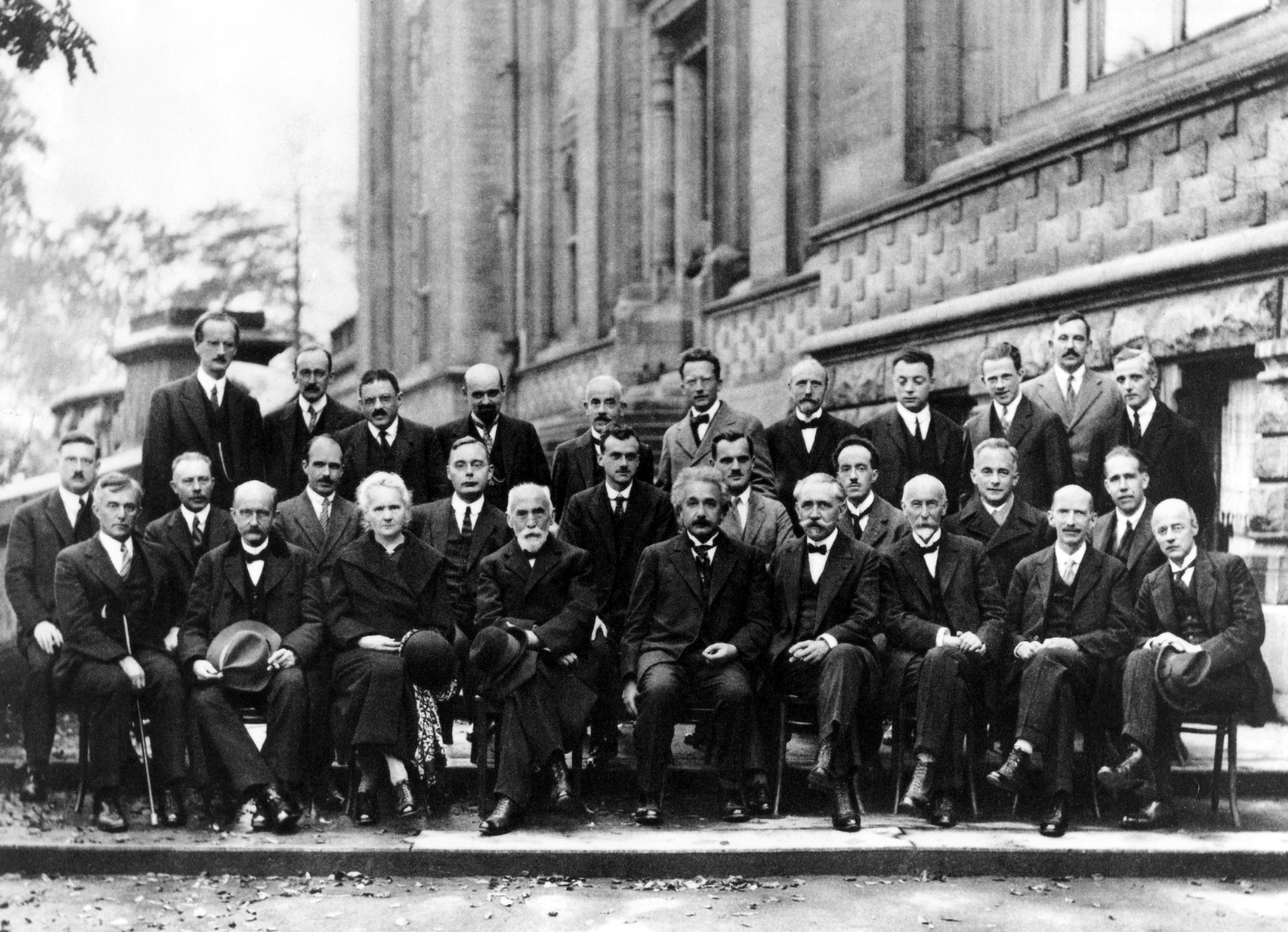
The Fifth Solvay International Conference on Electrons and Photons in 1927.

== Overview ==
He describes Einstein, Bohr and the "Great Debate about the Nature of Reality" that played out over a number of years, particularly at the Fifth Solvay International Conference on electrons and photons in 1927, where the physicists met to discuss the then newly formulated quantum theory. It narrates the life of some eminent physicists and their work and also gives a view of the environment of science at that time. It tells the life stories of Bohr, Einstein, Planck, Rutherford, Schrödinger, and others.

== Reception ==
Quantum was number 1 on the Hindustan Times top 10 science books you should read in 2012. Quantum had also been shortlisted for the BBC Samuel Johnson Prize for Non-Fiction, 2009.

== See also ==
- Bohr–Einstein debates
- EPR paradox
