= A Dominant Character =

2019 biography by Samanth Subramanian

- Author: Samanth Subramanian
- Language: Indian English
- Genre: Biography
- Publisher: Simon and Schuster
- Publication date: 2019
- Publication place: India

A Dominant Character: The Radical Science and Restless Politics of J. B. S. Haldane is a biography of J. B. S. Haldane, British-Indian geneticist, communist and writer; written by Samanth Subramanian and published by Simon and Schuster in 2019.

== Publication ==
A Dominant Character is a biography of J. B. S. Haldane who was a British-Indian geneticist, scientist, innovator, author, writer and communist philosopher. The book was published on 10 December 2019 by Simon & Schuster UK and has 384 pages.

== Summary ==
J.B.S. Haldane was a scientist who was born in Britain yet was spiritually inclined towards India. He saw action in the two World Wars, was engaged in the most radical politics of his day, conducted scientific research, and wrote with flair and conviction. The book describes his intellect, vision of society, philosophy, and scientific progress. In the latter part, the book mentions his journey to India and within India, from Kolkata to Bhubaneswar.

== Reception ==
Jacob Koshy, in The Hindu, wrote that the work is an "exquisite literary expedition" into J.B.S.’ boyhood, his family history, his schooling. Koshy wrote that many facts of Haldane's life are well documented in the book and concluded that Subramanian gave compelling context.

Shobhit Mahajan wrote that the book is a "comprehensive account" of Haldane's life in a review for Outlook magazine. He noted that the biography grapples well with a great life and found the book well-researched, with extensive use of Haldane's diaries and private letters. He praised the author's "lucid writing" and described the book as a "page-turner" with brilliant asides. He further wrote that the book does a decent job of explaining complicated scientific work in simpler terms, but points out that the author leaves out some details of the work done by Haldane.

Vineetha Mokkil, writing for The Hindu Businessline, praised the work and called it a "major contribution in modern intellectual history as well as an insightful and moving biography". She wrote that the author did a "fine job" in bringing Haldane to life.

In a review for The Wire, T. N. Avinash also wrote that author did "admirable job" describing Haldane's life and how political scenarios formed his worldview. However, he criticised the omission of some of the scientific responses to Haldane's work, such as Ernst Mayr’s critique of ‘beanbag genetics’. R. Prasannan, writing for The Week Magazine, called the work an "honest biography", but noted that there are few details about Bhubaneswar, a city where Haldane settled in later life. He also lamented the lack of an index.

Firstpost listed it in the Books of Week on 11 January 2020.

The book has been selected as one of the 100 Notable Books of 2020 by The New York Times.
