= Margaret Carson =

Margaret Carson (July 11, 1911 – October 11, 2007) was an American publicist who was highly influential within the classical music world. She was a publicist for many important artists during her lengthy career, most notably working closely for several decades with Leonard Bernstein. She also notably served as the Metropolitan Opera's press director during the tenure of Edward Johnson and into the early portion of Rudolf Bing's career at the Met. The New York Times stated that, Carson was "widely regarded as the leading lady of classical music publicists in New York, who guided a generation of singers through the Metropolitan Opera and shepherded the career of Leonard Bernstein." She was married to journalist Robert Sherrod.

== Biography ==
Carson was born Margaret Klein in Salt Lake City, Utah, where her father, Morris Klein, was the owner of a local department store. In 1920, at the age of nine, she moved with her parents and four sisters to Toledo, Ohio, where she lived for the rest of her youth. She earned a bachelor's degree from the University of Toledo and a master's degree from Ohio State University. In 1937, she married her first husband, newspaper editor Charles F. Carson, Jr.

After divorcing her first husband in 1940, Carson moved to New York City, where she began working as a press agent. (She used her first husband's name to the end of her life, suppressing evidence of her maiden name.) In 1944 she became the press director of the Metropolitan Opera, serving in that capacity over the next decade. She also handled press relations for novelist Theodore Dreiser, poet Ezra Pound, and the American Academy of Arts and Letters during the 1940s.

While working in New York during World War II, Carson married press agent Carl N. Ruff, with whom she briefly shared a public relations office. Carson and Ruff were divorced in the 1950s and Carson's third marriage, to journalist Robert Sherrod (1961–1972), also ended in divorce. She had two children: a son from her first marriage, Charles F.C. Ruff (adopted by Mr. Ruff upon his marriage to Ms. Carson), and a daughter from her second marriage, Carla Ruff. Her son was a prominent American lawyer who became chief White House counsel for President Bill Clinton, representing the President during his Senate impeachment trial in 1999. She also had three grandchildren and three great-grandchildren.

Carson remained active as a publicist up until her death, often working closely with colleague Edgar Vincent. Her most important client was Leonard Bernstein, with whom she enjoyed a close personal friendship as well as productive professional relationship. After his death in 1990, she remained a consultant to his production company. She also enjoyed long professional associations with conductor Michael Tilson Thomas and jazz musician Benny Goodman. Carson died in New York City in 2007.
