= From Eternity to Here =

2010 book by Sean M. Carroll

From Eternity to Here: The Quest for the Ultimate Theory of Time
- Hardcover edition
- Author: Sean M. Carroll
- Language: English
- Subject: Arrow of time; philosophy of time
- Genre: Nonfiction
- Publisher: Dutton
- Publication date: January 7, 2010
- Publication place: United States
- Media type: Print; e-book; audiobook
- Pages: 448 pp.
- ISBN: 978-0525951339
- OCLC: 892059776
- Preceded by: Spacetime and Geometry
- Followed by: The Particle at the End of the Universe
- Website: Official website

From Eternity to Here: The Quest for the Ultimate Theory of Time is a nonfiction book by American theoretical physicist Sean M. Carroll, published on January 7, 2010, by Dutton.

== Background ==
In the book, Carroll explores the nature of the arrow of time, that goes forward from the past to the future, and posits that the arrow owes its existence to conditions before the Big Bang. However, reasoning about what was there before the Big Bang has traditionally been dismissed as meaningless, for space and time are considered to be created exactly at the Big Bang. Carroll argues that "understanding the arrow of time is a matter of understanding the origin of the universe" and in his explanations relies on the second law of thermodynamics, which states that all systems in the Universe tend to become more and more disorganized (increase in entropy). His proposed explanation for the arrow of time is based on ideas that go back to Ludwig Boltzmann, an Austrian physicist of the 1870s.

== Book organization ==
The book is divided into four parts and 15 chapters and has an appendix for the relevant math. Part one is entitled, "Time, Experience, and the Universe." Part two is named, "Time in Einstein’s Universe." Part three is called, "Entropy and Time’s Arrow." Part four is entitled, "From the Kitchen to the Multiverse."

== Reception ==
Manjit Kumar in his review for the Daily Telegraph called the book "a rewarding read" that was "not for the faint hearted". Writing for The A.V. Club, Donna Bowman commented, "Its appeal lies in Carroll's gift for leading readers through the train of thought that connects black holes, light cones, event horizons, Laplace's demon (or Maxwell’s), dark energy, and entropy with the question of time... Like all great teachers, he makes his subject irresistible, and makes his students feel smarter." A reviewer of Kirkus Reviews added, "Not for the scientifically disinclined, but determined readers will come away with a rewarding grasp of a complex subject."

Andreas Albrecht, writing for Physics Today, gave the book a generally positive review, while noting that Carroll's attempts to provide material for both lay and expert readers might at times leave both dissatisfied. In his review for New Scientist, philosopher Craig Callender wrote that "Carroll seems slightly embarrassed by the many leaps of faith he asks of his reader" in explaining his hypothesis for the origin of the arrow of time. Eric Winsberg's evaluation of Carroll's proposal concluded by saying that its conceptual costs "seem high, and the benefits few."
