= Polly Morland =

21st-century British writer

Polly Morland is a British writer and documentary maker.

== Career ==
She worked in television for 15 years as a producer and director of documentaries for the BBC, Channel 4 and Discovery, including The 9/11 Conspiracies (2004), Who Wrote the Bible? (2004) and The Fourth Age 410 AD - 1066 AD in the series Seven Ages of Britain (2003).

Morland received a Jerwood Award in 2011 for work on her 2013 book The Society of Timid Souls: Or How to be Brave. The award was given by the Royal Society of Literature for "to authors engaged on their first major commissioned works of non-fiction". The book is a study of courage and takes its name from a group set up by 1940s American concert pianist Bernard Gabriel to help performers overcome stage fright. In the course of the book Morland talks to "soldiers, surfers, a matador, firefighters and professional daredevils ... a man who fixes the upper sections of skyscrapers, and is afraid of heights ... people who have been diagnosed with terminal diseases ... a former armed robber."

Her 2022 work A Fortunate Woman: A Country Doctor’s Story was shortlisted for the Baillie Gifford Prize. The book mirrors John Berger's 1967 work A Fortunate Man: The Story of a Country Doctor, after Morland found a copy of this work while clearing her mother's house and realised that it was an account of a GP's life in the same area. She contacted a contemporary doctor working in the area, who herself had been inspired to take up medicine after reading Berger's book as a child, and the book is an account of her 21st-century general practice.

Morland held a Royal Society of Literature fellowship at Cardiff University in 2020–2023.

== Selected publications ==
- Morland, Polly (2013). The Society of Timid Souls : or, How to be brave. Profile Books. ISBN 9781781251904.
- Morland, Polly (2014). Metamorphosis : how and why we change. Profile Books. ISBN 9781781254134.
- Morland, Polly (2015). Risk wise : nine everyday adventures. Profile Books. ISBN 9781781254486.
- Morland, Polly (2022). A fortunate woman : a country doctor's story. Picador. ISBN 9781529071139.
