= WWII in HD =

American documentary television series

- Promotional poster
- Genre: Documentary; War
- Written by: Matthew Ginsburg, Ben Kaplan, Hunter Dunn, Liz Reph, Bruce Kennedy, Alec Michod
- Directed by: Frederic Lumiere; Matthew Ginsburg
- Starring: Justin Bartha; Rob Corddry; Tim DeKay; Mark Hefti; James Kyson Lee; Ron Livingston; LL Cool J Rob Lowe; Josh Lucas; Jason Ritter; Amy Smart; Steve Zahn
- Narrated by: Gary Sinise
- Theme music composer: Lorne Balfe
- Composer: David Joseph Wesley
- Country of origin: United States
- Original language: English
- No. of episodes: 10

Production
- Producers: Liz Reph; Frederic Lumiere
- Running time: 45 minutes

Original release
- Network: History Channel
- Release: November 15 – November 19, 2009

World War II in HD is a History Channel television series that chronicles the hardships of World War II, using rare films shot in color never seen on television before. The episodes premiered on five consecutive days in mid-November 2009, with two episodes per day. The series is narrated by Gary Sinise and was produced by Lou Reda Productions in Easton, Pennsylvania.

== Featured people ==
=== Jimmie Kanaya ===
The son of Japanese immigrants, who served in the U.S. Army and was imprisoned in Europe. He is the first American soldier of Japanese descent to become an officer in the U.S. Army. He is portrayed by James Kyson Lee. Jimmie Kanaya went on to serve with distinction in the Korean War and Vietnam. He died on November 7, 2019, at the age of 99, the last living person featured in the WWII in HD documentary series.

=== Jack Werner ===
Retired 1st Sergeant Hans "Jack" Werner (born in Vienna, Austria) was an Austrian-American member of the H and S Company, 13th Combat Engineer Battalion, 7th Infantry Division of the Army. Being Jewish, Hans fled Austria to the United States after the annexation of Austria by Nazi Germany. Hans, who changed his "far too German" name to Jack, traveled to Hollywood to become an actor. He later joined the 7th Infantry Division, stationed at Camp Ord, California, as a private months before the attack on Pearl Harbor and although he wanted to fight in Europe, he was stationed with "undisciplined" on Attu Island during the Battle of Attu. After the Battle of Kwajalein and Battle of Leyte Gulf, Werner participated in Battle of Okinawa and after the war ended, he retired to live with his re-united wife and had 3 children. He died on July 17, 2011. He is portrayed by Justin Bartha.

=== Shelby Westbrook ===
Shelby Westbrook was a Fighter Pilot in World War II fighting with the 332nd Fighter Group (Tuskegee Airmen). He trained at the Tuskegee Institute in Alabama in 1943 before fighting in Europe in 1944. He was stationed in Italy in an all black airbase (since the army was still segregated). On one day of combat, his Mustang was damaged and he managed to land in a field deep in German controlled Yugoslavia. Lt. Westbrook managed to escape with the help of resistance members that were being supplied by the allies, within 30 days, he was back at his base in Italy ready to return to active duty. Because of his dedicated service record while fighting in Southern France in support of "Operation Dragoon" (the Allied Invasion of Southern France), Lt. Westbrook was awarded the French Legion of Honor Medal (French: Ordre national de la Légion d'honneur) in November 2013. Westbrook died on August 17, 2016. He is portrayed by LL Cool J.

=== Jack Yusen ===
Jack Yusen was a navy member when he joined in 1944. He was assigned the USS Samuel B. Roberts, his objective being to escort transport ships in the Atlantic Ocean from German U-boat attacks. The ship was later assigned to move to the Pacific theater where it engaged in the recapture of the Philippines. The ship was part of Taffy-3 escort when it engaged in the famous Battle off Samar on October 25, 1944. The ship was sunk by the Japanese task force and he abandoned ship. He spent several days in the shark-infested ocean until he was finally rescued. He died on October 10, 2016, at the age of 90. The wreck of the Samuel B. Roberts was recently found. Texan multi-millionaire and adventurer Victor Vescovo, who owns a deep-diving submersible, discovered the "Sammy B" intact. He is portrayed by Jason Ritter.

=== Rockie Blunt ===
Roscoe C. Blunt, Jr. (July 29, 1925 - February 10, 2011) was journalist, jazz drummer, and veteran of the U.S. Army's 84th Infantry Division from World War II. He was the youngest soldier to be awarded the Expert Infantry Badge. After returning home from the war, he became an award-winning investigative journalist as well as an expert jazz and big-band drummer. He is the author of three books, including Inside the Battle of the Bulge and Foot Soldier: A Combat Infantryman's War in Europe (Cambridge: Da Capo Press, 2002). He lived in Shrewsbury, Massachusetts, until his death on February 10, 2011. He is portrayed by Rob Corddry.

During the Battle of the Bulge, Blunt was captured by a German SS unit, but brazenly convinced the SS soldiers that they were surrounded by American troops, whereupon 100 of the Germans surrendered to their 18 American prisoners. Blunt was also court-martialed prior to the implementation of the Uniform Code of Military Justice for "fraternizing with the enemy", after his company commander had Blunt take his uniforms into a German town to be cleaned. When Blunt returned the next day to pay the German laundress and her 17-year-old daughter, and to get his own uniforms cleaned, he was seen by another commander leaving the house and was reported to higher command. With the assistance of Stephen Kellicker (then a young U.S. congressional aide), Blunt received a pardon from outgoing President Bill Clinton 55 years after the incident, in 2001.

=== June Wandrey ===
June Wandrey Mann (June 25, 1920 – November 27, 2005) was a first lieutenant in the U.S. Army Nurse Corps from Wautoma, Wisconsin. She was the author of Bedpan Commando, an account of her military service in Africa, Sicily, Italy, France, and Germany from 1942 to 1946, during which she was awarded eight battle stars. Mann's book garnered significant public and media attention, leading to numerous television, radio and personal appearances, including on Larry King Live, NBC Nightly News, and The Paul Harvey Show, among others. On June 22, 1995, Mann met with President Bill Clinton in Nettuno, Italy, as part of celebrations to commemorate the 50th anniversary of the Anzio Beachhead Invasion. She was a life member of numerous veterans' associations, including the Disabled American Veterans, the Veterans of Foreign Wars, Anzio Beachhead Association, 36th Inf. Div., 3rd Inf. Div., and the 10th & 40th Combat Engineers. She is portrayed by Amy Smart.

=== Bert Stiles ===
Bert Stiles (August 30, 1920 - November 26, 1944) was an American author of short stories who was killed in action during World War II while serving as a fighter pilot in the U.S. Army Air Forces. Bert Stiles was laid to rest in the Ardennes American Cemetery in Belgium. He is portrayed by Josh Lucas.

=== Robert Sherrod ===
Robert Lee Sherrod (February 8, 1909 - February 13, 1994) was an American journalist, editor and author. He was a war correspondent for Time and Life magazines, covering combat from World War II to the Vietnam War. During World War II, embedded with the U.S. Marines, he covered the battles at Attu, Tarawa, Saipan, Iwo Jima, and Okinawa. He also authored five books on World War II, including Tarawa: The Story of a Battle (1944) and the definitive History of Marine Corps Aviation in World War II (1952). He was an editor of Time during World War II and later he was editor of The Saturday Evening Post, then vice-president of Curtis Publishing Company. He is portrayed by Rob Lowe.

=== Richard Tregaskis ===
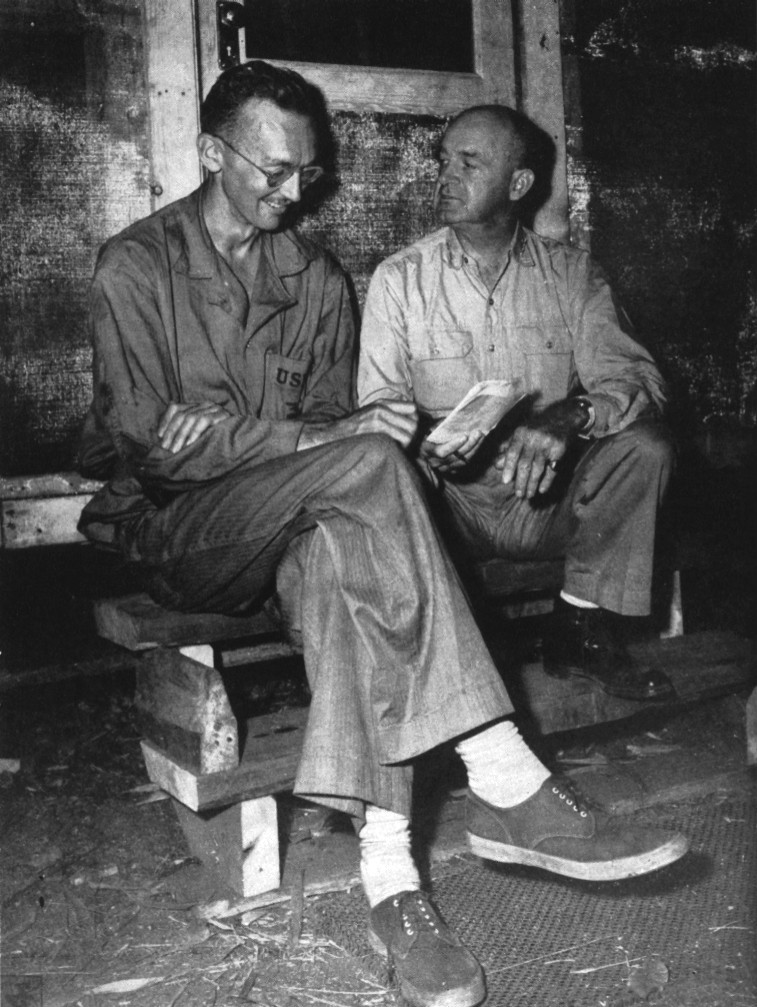
Richard Tregaskis (left) with Major General Alexander A. Vandegrift (right) in a U.S. Marine Corps photograph dated 1942

Richard Tregaskis (November 28, 1916 - August 15, 1973) was a reporter for the International News Service who served as a frontline reporter for the Marines during both theatres of operation. Tregaskis was ineligible for the draft as he had type 1 diabetes and he instead became a reporter during the Guadalcanal Campaign on a small island in the Solomon Islands in late 1942 and early 1943. He used notes written during the campaign to produce a novel entitled Guadalcanal Diary, which became an instant success. The book was made into a film by 20th Century Fox, released in late 1943, while Richard transferred from the Pacific to Europe, covering the invasions of both Sicily and the Italian mainland. After a shrapnel shell was lodged in his brain, he retired from reporting World War II and later returned to the front lines to cover the Korean War and Vietnam War. He is portrayed by Tim DeKay.

=== Archie Sweeney ===
From upstate New York, he was one of the first peacetime draftees in the United States after President Franklin Roosevelt signed the Selective Training and Service Act of 1940. Sweeney was killed in action on April 1, 1943. He is portrayed by Mark Hefti.

=== Charles Scheffel ===
He was wounded twice, and asked to be sent back to his own unit after the first injury. He was sent home after a second injury resulted in the amputation of his trigger finger. He was married to his wife, Ruth, until her death in 1999. They have three children. Charles Scheffel died on June 24, 2011. He joined his wife of 57 years, 12 years after her death. His body, by his wishes, was donated to medical research. He is portrayed by himself in some portions and by Ron Livingston in others..

Scheffel's book of his wartime experiences, Crack! and Thump: With a Combat Infantry Officer in World War II, was published in 2007.

=== Nolen Marbrey ===
He is portrayed by Steve Zahn. PFC Nolen Marbrey died on August 15, 1997.

== Episodes ==
No.	Title	Original release date
1	"Darkness Falls"	November 15, 2009
As Europe falls under Nazi control, America is unprepared for war and the attack on Pearl Harbor. The first bloody battles are fought on Guadalcanal and in North Africa.
2	"Hard Way Back"	November 15, 2009
The Allies take on the daunting forces of the Axis, with victory far from certain. Charles Scheffel battles Rommel's forces in Tunisia and Jack Werner faces bitter combat in the northern Pacific.
3	"Bloody Resolve"	November 16, 2009
The Marines assault Tarawa in one of the bloodiest battles yet waged. MacArthur island-hops and Italy's front lines claim a casualty.
4	"Battle Stations"	November 16, 2009
The Allies lay plans for the invasion of France; Bert Stiles and the 8th Air Force attempt to clear the skies over Normandy, while the Pacific remains unresolved.
5	"Day of Days"	November 17, 2009
The episode follows Charles Scheffel in Normandy and Jack Yusen in his early weeks in the navy. The Allies are bogged down in Normandy's hedgerows in the aftermath of D-Day, while on Saipan, victory turns to horror. Robert Sherrod witnesses the Battle of Saipan and the infamous mass suicides committed by the local civilians.
6	"Point of No Return"	November 17, 2009
The Allies race toward Germany as American Marines battle for ground on Peleliu and across the bloody Pacific.
7	"Striking Distance"	November 18, 2009
American forces storm the Philippines while Shelby Westbrook is shot down over Europe. Jack Yusen battles the dangers of the deep when his ship is sunk after a heroic duel.
8	"Glory and Guts"	November 18, 2009
The Marine assault on Iwo Jima brings horror and glory. Pilot Bert Stiles engages a German fighter with disastrous consequences. Reinforcements arrive in Europe to push the Allies toward victory.
9	"Edge of the Abyss"	November 19, 2009
The Battle of the Bulge pushes the Allies to the brink, and Rockie Blunt barely survives the fight. Okinawa erupts as the Japanese make their last stand. Hitler is handed a final ultimatum.
10	"End Game"	November 19, 2009
With the end in sight, Okinawa is a bloody obstacle to victory. The Third Reich ends with a single gunshot. America delivers the final blow to Japan and the world celebrates the fall of the Axis.

== WWII in HD: The Air War ==
In November 2010, History aired WWII in HD: The Air War, focusing on the Eighth Air Force's strategic campaign against the German Luftwaffe in the months leading up to D-Day. The special, using never-before-seen 8mm color footage, centers on the firsthand experiences of B-17 bombardier Joe Armanini (Casey Affleck), P-47 fighter pilot Steve Pisanos (Sean Astin), B-17 pilot John Gibbons (Chris O'Donnell), and Stars and Stripes correspondent Andy Rooney (Elijah Wood). Rob Lowe narrated the program that was produced by Lou Reda Productions.

== See also ==
- Vietnam in HD
