= Imperial Twilight =

History book by Stephen R. Platt

- First edition
- Author: Stephen R. Platt
- Genre: History
- Set in: China
- Publisher: Alfred A. Knopf

Imperial Twilight: The Opium War and the End of China's Last Golden Age is a history book by Stephen R. Platt relating the events during the lead-up to the First Opium War of 1839–1842. The book was well-received by critics, who were generally supportive of the conclusions Platt reached in the book.

== Description ==
Imperial Twilight was written by Stephen R. Platt, a historian and professor of Chinese history at the University of Massachusetts at Amherst. Platt had previously written a number of books concerning Chinese history. The book itself was concerned with the Old China Trade, the Canton System, and the events leading up to the start of the First Opium War in the mid-19th century. As noted by several reviewers, Platt focused heavily not on the opium war itself, but rather on the historical figures that led the British and Chinese empires towards war. Platt is noted as having place special emphasis on relaying the stories and methods of Willam Jardine and James Matheson, two British merchants who knowingly assisted in the smuggling of illegal opium into Southern China; this smuggling would later become the direct cause of the Anglo-Sino hostilities. Platt also focuses heavily on the in-decline system of bureaucracy that dominated the Qing dynasty during the lead-up to the Opium Wars. Platt concluded in Imperial Twilight that the Chinese, though knowledgeable and well-organized, were incapable of understanding the threat that Westernized British Empire's economic system and military posed to Imperial China; he also dedicated later chapters of the book to examining how the defeat of the Qing dynasty's forces in the First Opium War set the empire on the path to dissolution at the start of the 20th century.

Several reviews of Imperial Twilight noted that the book's release in early 2018 was relevant given the rising trade tensions between the United States and the People's Republic of China; these reviewers pointed out that the Opium Wars were caused in part by similar disagreements over trade.

=== Reception ===
The book was well-received by critics. Ian Morris wrote for The New York Times Book Review that Imperial Twilight was “[A] superb history… Platt has written an enthralling account of the run-up to war between Britain and China", while Julian Gewirtz of The Wall Street Journal noted that the “Masterly . . . [Platt’s] book is important reading not only for those interested in China’s history but also for anyone seeking to understand the explosive intersection between trade and politics today.”

Platt won a shortlist Baillie Gifford Prize in 2018 for Imperial Twilight.
