= Vishnu's Crowded Temple =

2007 book by Maria Misra

Vishnu's Crowded Temple: India since the Great Rebellion
- Author: Maria Misra
- Language: English
- Genre: Non-fiction
- Publisher: Penguin Group; Yale University Press
- Publication date: 2007
- Publication place: United Kingdom

Vishnu's Crowded Temple: India since the Great Rebellion is a book written by Maria Misra. The book was first published in 2007 in United Kingdom by Penguin Group and in 2008 in the United States by Yale University Press.

The book details the modern history of India since 1876 when Queen Victoria was declared Empress of India. The book provides an alternative account of modern Indian history, focusing on the consistent and integral role of caste and religious politics in the Indian system. Misra's account clarifies that the undercurrents of these themes have been consistent in the Indian political arena since at least Imperial times, but have sharpened and been manipulated to a greater extent in the post-colonial period. The result is that today, India's democracy is inherently politicized on the basis of caste, linguistic, and religious distinctions. Yet, these are not aberrations from some pure past, but simply a revised version of the dimensioning of previous times and eras.
