= Stephen R. Platt =

American historian and writer

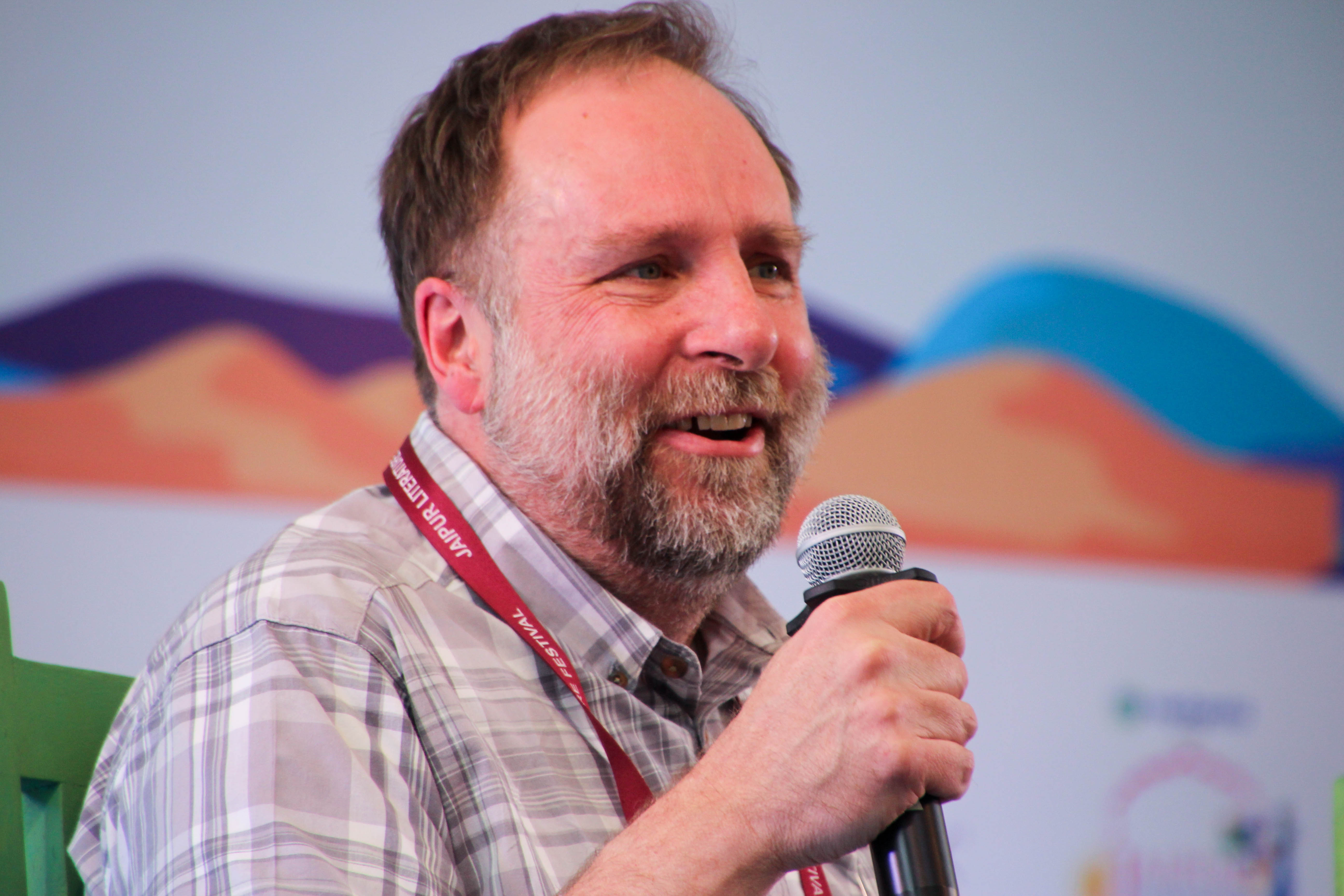
- Occupations: Author, historian
- Employer: University of Massachusetts Amherst

Stephen R. Platt is an American historian and writer. He is currently a professor of Chinese history at the University of Massachusetts Amherst.

== Early life and education ==
Platt holds a PhD in Chinese history from Yale University (2004). His area of expertise is in modern China, especially in the nineteenth century and the Qing dynasty's foreign relations.

== Writing career ==
In 2007 he published Provincial Patriots: The Hunanese and Modern China.

Platt's books Autumn in the Heavenly Kingdom and Imperial Twilight examine East-West relations in China during the 19th century, focusing on the Taiping Rebellion (1850-1864) and the period leading up the First Opium War (1800-1842).

He published Imperial Twilight in 2018, and Autumn in the Heavenly Kingdom in 2012.

Platt has also written for The New York Times, Chinafile, The Atlantic, The Wall Street Journal, and Late Imperial China.

== Awards and honors ==
- 2004 Theron Rockwell Field Prize (Yale University) for dissertation Hunanese Nationalism and the Revival of Wang Fuzhi, 1839-1923
- 2012 Cundill Prize in History winner for Autumn in the Heavenly Kingdom
- 2018 Baillie Gifford Prize shortlist for Imperial Twilight

== Bibliography ==
- Provincial Patriots: The Hunanese and Modern China (Harvard University Press, 2007).
- Autumn in the Heavenly Kingdom: China, the West, and the Epic Story of the Taiping Civil War (Knopf, 2012)
- Imperial Twilight: The Opium War and the End of China's Last Golden Age (Alfred A. Knopf, 2018)
- The Raider: The Untold Story of a Renegade Marine and the Birth of U.S. Special Forces in World War II (Knopf, 2025)
