= Something Deeply Hidden =

2019 book by Sean M. Carroll

Something Deeply Hidden: Quantum Worlds and the Emergence of Spacetime
- Hardcover edition
- Author: Sean M. Carroll
- Language: English
- Subject: Quantum mechanics
- Genre: Non-fiction
- Publisher: Dutton
- Publication date: September 10, 2019
- Publication place: United States
- Media type: Print, e-book, audiobook
- Pages: 368 pp.
- ISBN: 978-1524743017
- OCLC: 1134416421
- Preceded by: The Big Picture
- Followed by: The Biggest Ideas in the Universe
- Website: Official website

Something Deeply Hidden: Quantum Worlds and the Emergence of Spacetime is a non-fiction book by American theoretical physicist Sean M. Carroll. The book, his fifth, was released on September 10, 2019 by Dutton.

== Synopsis ==
In this book, Carroll examines the reasons why people misunderstand quantum mechanics and advocates a version of the many-worlds interpretation, while objecting to the views often grouped together as the Copenhagen interpretation.

== Reception ==
Reviews in Publishers Weekly and Kirkus were generally positive, while the latter noted that Carroll's "eschewing mathematics" may have been somewhat detrimental when discussing topics that "might benefit from at least a little math," observing, "Readers who remember freshman college physics will be intrigued; others will struggle." Physicist and writer Adam Frank in his review for NPR wrote that he did not in the end find Carroll's arguments convincing (Frank himself leans in the direction of QBism), but that Carroll's case was "carefully reasoned" and his presentations of the various opposing views were fair. Writing in Physics Today, Matthew Leifer was more critical, saying that "the alternatives to [many worlds] are not as hopeless as Carroll makes them out to be" and finding Carroll's treatment of Bell's theorem too superficial.

Science writer Jim Baggott criticized the publication of Something Deeply Hidden and the many world interpretation more broadly as "post-empirical science". The book was also reviewed by science writer Philip Ball and by physicist-authors Chad Orzel and Sabine Hossenfelder.
