= Jennifer Ouellette =

American science writer

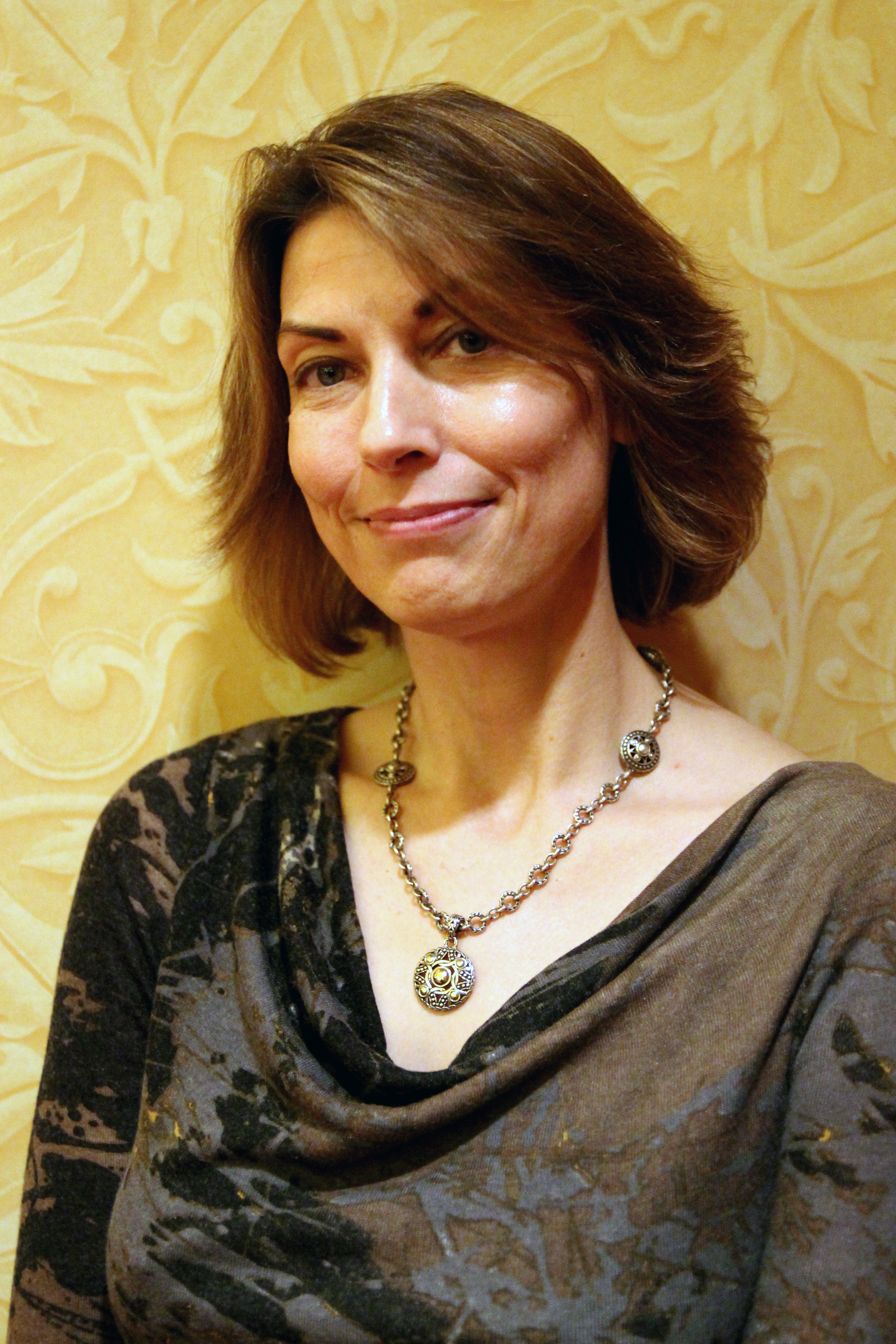
- Ouellette in 2012
- Born: 1964 (age 61–62)
- Citizenship: United States
- Education: BA English, Seattle Pacific University, 1985
- Occupations: Writer and editor
- Spouse: Sean M. Carroll (m. 2007)

Jennifer Ouellette (born 1964) is an American science writer and editor.

== Early life ==
Ouellette was born in Ashland, Wisconsin in 1964. She attended Seattle Pacific University, where she majored in English. Her website once described her as having "stumbled into science writing quite by accident as a struggling freelance writer in New York City".

== Career ==
From 1995 to 2004, Ouellette was a contributing editor of The Industrial Physicist, published by the American Institute of Physics; she has also served as associate editor and columnist for APS News, published by the American Physical Society. She has written for periodicals including Discover, Mental Floss, Nature, New Scientist, Physics Today, Physics World, Salon.com, Slate, Smithsonian, Symmetry, The Wall Street Journal, and The Washington Post.

Starting in 2006, Ouellette wrote a blog for Scientific American titled Cocktail Party Physics. She said she wanted to put a positive spin on the name, "generally a pejorative term among scientists". She explained: "Not every discussion about science needs to be an earnest, pedagogical event [...] most of what I write tries to restore science to its rightful place [as an integral part] in our culture."

From 2008 to 2010, Ouellette was director of the Science & Entertainment Exchange, an initiative of the National Academy of Sciences (NAS) designed to connect entertainment industry professionals with top scientists and engineers to help the creators of television shows, films, video games, and other productions incorporate science into their work.

The National Academy is hoping to basically foster this current trend in television and get more interactions between science and Hollywood, in the hopes of changing the way science and scientists are portrayed. [...] We want Hollywood to basically help us inspire people and to get them interested in science and in rationalism so that they then go on to read more and become more educated.

Ouellette has served as journalist-in-residence at the Kavli Institute for Theoretical Physics at the University of California, Santa Barbara and as an instructor with the Santa Fe Science Writing Workshop. In 2012, she joined the American Association for the Advancement of Science's (AAAS) Committee on Science and Technology Engagement with the Public.

Ouellette was senior science editor at Gizmodo, joining the site in 2015. In 2018, she joined Ars Technica as a contributor. As of 2024 she is a senior writer for the site. She is a member of the Authors Guild and the National Association of Science Writers.

== Awards ==
- Science writing award, Acoustical Society of America
- Humanist of the Year, American Humanist Association (AHA), 2018

== Personal life ==
Ouellette holds a black belt in jiu jitsu. She is married to physicist Sean M. Carroll. They live in Baltimore, Maryland.

Accepting her Humanist of the Year award at the AHA's 2018 conference, Ouellette spoke of her brother's struggle with and death from cancer, saying medical professionals should not "hide behind euphemisms and platitudes" that hinder end-of-life decision making, and about patients' need for frankness and honesty about their prognosis. She spoke about the suffering due to the limitations of the medical profession's current understanding of pain management and the need for research, and about her support for right-to-die legislation.

== Selected publications ==
=== Articles ===
- Ouellette, Jennifer (December 22–29, 2007). "What a duet for a girl and goatherd". New Scientist. Vol. 196, no. 2635–2636. pp. 58–59. doi:10.1016/S0262-4079(07)63221-7. ISSN 0262-4079. ProQuest 200454714.
- ———— (January 2008). "Femtosecond Lasers Prepare to Break Out of the Laboratory". Physics Today. 61 (1): 36–38. Bibcode:2008PhT....61a..36O. doi:10.1063/1.2835147. ISSN 0031-9228.
- ———— (July 21, 2010). "Going With the Flow". The Wall Street Journal (book review). ISSN 0099-9660. ProQuest 614375626.
- ———— (November 2010). "Big Game Theory". Discover. pp. 58–62. ISSN 0274-7529.
- ———— (January 5, 2011). "The Scholar and the Caliph". Physics World. Vol. 24, no. 1. pp. 21–24. Bibcode:2011PhyW...24a..21O. doi:10.1088/2058-7058/24/01/31. ISSN 0953-8585.
- ———— (April 28, 2015). "How Quantum Pairs Stitch Space-Time". Quanta Magazine. ISSN 2640-2661.

=== Books ===
- Ouellette, Jennifer (2005). Black Bodies and Quantum Cats: Tales from the Annals of Physics. New York: Penguin Books. ISBN 978-0-14-303603-6 – via the Internet Archive.
- ———— (2006). The Physics of the Buffyverse. illustrated by Paul Dlugokencky. New York: Penguin Books. ISBN 978-0-14-303862-7 – via the Internet Archive.
- ———— (2010). The Calculus Diaries: How Math Can Help You Lose Weight, Win in Vegas, and Survive a Zombie Apocalypse. Penguin Books. ISBN 978-0-14-311737-7.
- Ouellette, Jennifer; Zivkovic, Bora, eds. (2012). The Best Science Writing Online 2012. New York: Scientific American; Farrar, Straus and Giroux. ISBN 978-0-374-53334-2 – via the Internet Archive.
- Ouellette, Jennifer (2014). Me, Myself, and Why: Searching for the Science of Self. New York: Penguin Books. ISBN 978-0-14-312165-7.
