= 1599: A Year in the Life of William Shakespeare =

2005 book about William Shakespeare

- Author: James S. Shapiro
- Publisher: Faber and Faber
- Publication date: January 1, 2005
- ISBN: 978-0-571-21481-5

1599: A Year in the Life of William Shakespeare is a 2005 book by James S. Shapiro about the life of William Shakespeare in the year 1599. 1599 was the year Shakespeare finished writing Henry V, and wrote Julius Caesar and As You Like It. In addition to detailing Shakespeare's life, Shapiro "delv[es] into evocative details of social, political, and artistic life in London in 1599."

== Critical reception ==
1599 received review from various sources.

Publishers Weekly called 1599 an "accessible yet erudite work".

The Guardian's Robert McCrum described 1599 as "an unforgettable illumination of a crucial moment in the life of our greatest writer".

Kirkus Reviews said 1599 is "an intriguing addition to Shakespeare studies" that is "sure to be hated by Harold Bloom and others who view any attempt to locate the Bard in history as blasphemy against the religion of Pure Art, but open-minded readers will be stimulated and enriched by Shapiro’s contextual approach".

== Awards ==
1599 won the 2006 Samuel Johnson Prize (now the Baillie Gifford prize) and its "Winner of winners" in 2023.
