= James S. Shapiro =

American academic and author (born 1955)

- Born: 1955 (age 70–71); Brooklyn, New York, U.S.
- Education: Columbia University; University of Chicago
- Occupation: Shakespeare scholar
- Employer: Columbia University
- Awards: Samuel Johnson Prize
- James Shapiro's voice from the BBC programme Front Row, March 26, 2010.

James S. Shapiro (born 1955) is Professor Emeritus of English and Comparative Literature at Columbia University, specializing in Shakespeare and the Early Modern period. Shapiro served on the faculty at Columbia University since 1985, teaching Shakespeare and other topics, and he has published widely on Shakespeare and Elizabethan culture.

== Life ==
Shapiro was born and raised in Brooklyn, New York, where he attended Midwood High School. He obtained his B.A. at Columbia University in 1977, Master's degree in 1978 and Ph.D. at University of Chicago in 1982. After teaching at Dartmouth College and Goucher College, Shapiro joined the faculty at Columbia University in 1985. He taught as a Fulbright lecturer at Bar-Ilan University and Tel Aviv University (1988–1989) and served as the Samuel Wanamaker Fellow at Shakespeare's Globe in London (1998).

Shapiro has received awards from the National Endowment for the Humanities, The Huntington Library, and the Memorial Foundation for Jewish Culture for his publications and academic activities. He has written for numerous periodicals, including The Chronicle of Higher Education, The New York Times Book Review, the Financial Times, and The Daily Telegraph. In 2006, he was named a John Simon Guggenheim Memorial Foundation Fellow as well as a Fellow at the Cullman Center for Scholars and Writers at the New York Public Library.

Shapiro won the 2006 Samuel Johnson Prize as well as the 2006 Theatre Book Prize for his work 1599: A Year in the Life of William Shakespeare, which Robert Nye described as "powerful" in Literary Review, set apart by Shapiro's precise and engrossing commentary on the sea-change in Shakespeare's language during the year 1599. In 2023, the book won the Baillie Gifford Prize's "Winner of Winners" award.

He also won the 2011 George Freedley Memorial Award, given by the Theatre Library Association, for his study of the Shakespeare authorship question, Contested Will: Who Wrote Shakespeare?, which has been described as the "definitive treatment" debunking the Oxfordian theory. The same year Shapiro was inducted into the American Academy of Arts and Sciences. Shapiro's book, The Year of Lear: Shakespeare in 1606, published in hardback in 2015, was awarded the James Tait Black Prize for Biography as well as the Sheridan Morley Prize for Theatre Biography. Shapiro presented a three-part series on BBC Four called The King & the Playwright: A Jacobean History about Shakespeare, King James VI and I and the Jacobean era.

In 2025 Shapiro received a PEN Oakland/Josephine Miles Literary Award for The Playbook: A Story of Theater, Democracy, and the Making of a Culture War.

He is married, has a son, and lives in New York City.

== Books ==
- Rival Playwrights: Marlowe, Jonson, Shakespeare. New York: Columbia University Press, 1991. ISBN 0-231-07540-5
- The Columbia History of British Poetry as associate editor with Carl Woodring. New York: Columbia University Press, 1993. ISBN 0-231-07838-2
- The Columbia Anthology of British Poetry Edited with Carl Woodring. New York: Columbia University Press, 1995. ISBN 0-231-10180-5
- Shakespeare and the Jews. New York: Columbia University Press, 1996. ISBN 0-231-10344-1
- Oberammergau: The Troubling Story of the World's Most Famous Passion Play. New York: Pantheon Books, 2000. ISBN 0-375-40926-2
- 1599: A Year in the Life of William Shakespeare. London: Faber and Faber, 2005. ISBN 0-571-21480-0
- Contested Will: Who Wrote Shakespeare? New York: Simon & Schuster; London: Faber and Faber, 2010. ISBN 1-4165-4162-4
- Shakespeare in America: An Anthology from the Revolution Until Now, ed. James Shapiro, with a foreword by Bill Clinton. New York: Library of America, 2014. ISBN 1598532952
- The Year of Lear: Shakespeare in 1606. New York: Simon & Schuster, October 6, 2015. ISBN 1416541640
- Shakespeare in a Divided America. New York: Penguin Press; London: Faber & Faber; March, 2020. ISBN 0525522298
- The Playbook: A Story of Theater, Democracy, and the Making of a Culture War. New York: Penguin Press; 2024. ISBN 9780593490204
