= Robert Sherrod =

World War II war correspondent, author, editor (1909–1994)

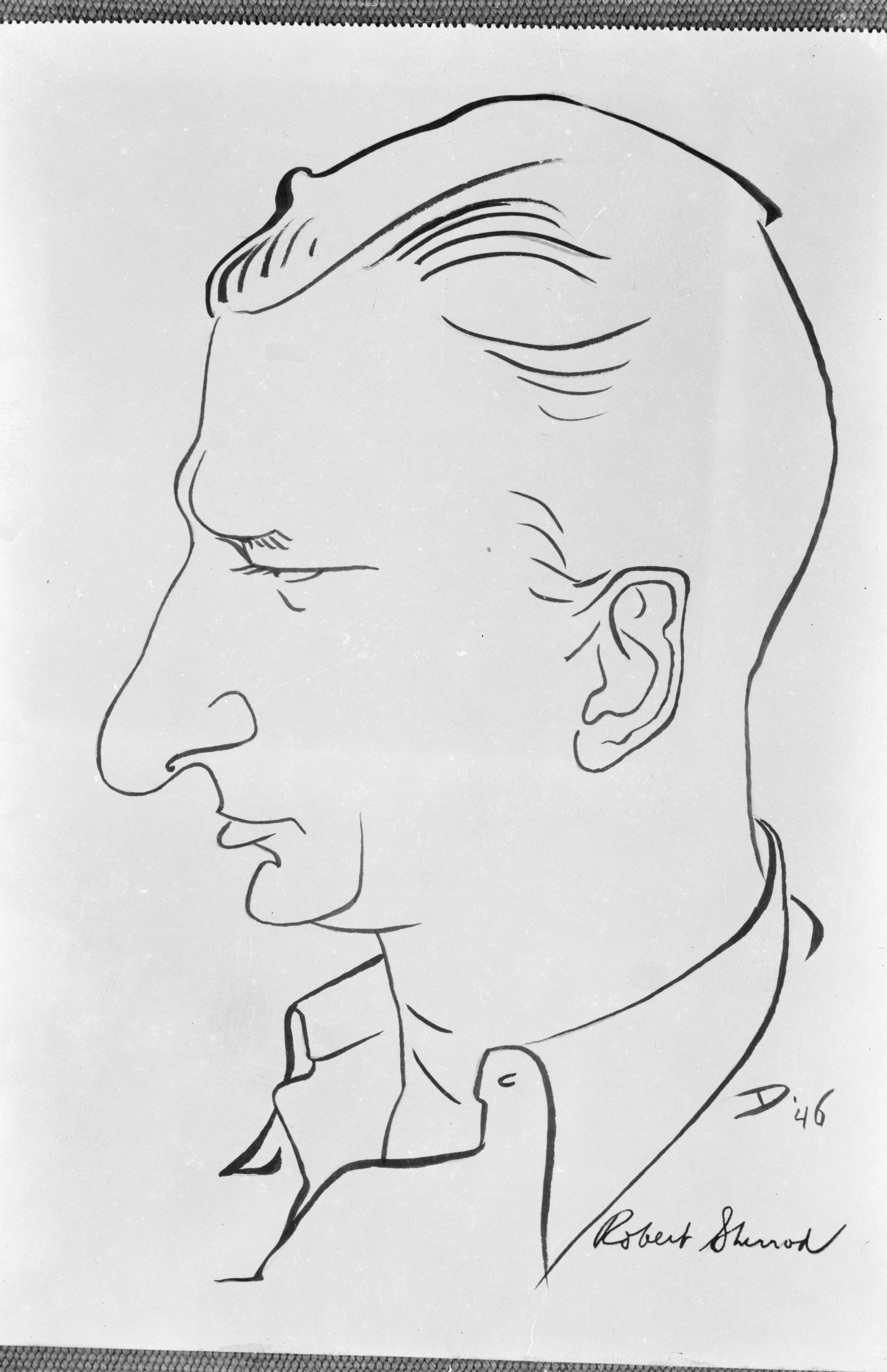
- Robert Sherrod, 1947
- Born: Robert Lee Sherrod; February 8, 1909; Thomas County, Georgia
- Died: February 13, 1994 (aged 85); Washington, D.C.
- Education: University of Georgia (1929)
- Occupations: Journalist, author, editor
- Notable credits: Tarawa: The Story of a Battle; On to Westward: The Battles of Saipan and Iwo Jima; History of Marine Corps Aviation in World War II
- Spouse(s): Elizabeth Hudson (1936–1958); Margaret Carson (1961–1972); Mary Gay Labrot Leonhardt (1972–1978)
- Children: 2

Robert Lee Sherrod (February 8, 1909 – February 13, 1994) was an American journalist, editor and writer. He was a war correspondent for Time and Life magazines, covering combat from World War II to the Vietnam War. During World War II, embedded with the United States Marine Corps, he covered the battles at Attu (with the U.S. Army), Tarawa, Saipan, Iwo Jima, and Okinawa. He also authored five books on World War II, including Tarawa: The Story of a Battle (1944) and the definitive History of Marine Corps Aviation in World War II (1952). He was an editor of Time during World War II and later editor of The Saturday Evening Post, then vice-president of Curtis Publishing Company.

== Early years and family ==
Robert Lee Sherrod was born on February 8, 1909, in Thomas County, Georgia. He graduated from The University of Georgia in 1929. He was married three times – to Elizabeth Hudson from 1936 until her death in 1958; to Margaret Carson, the prominent American publicist, from 1961 until 1972; and to Mary Gay Labrot Leonhardt from 1972 until her death in 1978. He had two sons, John and Robert L. Jr.

== Journalism career ==
After Sherrod's college graduation, he worked for newspapers in the South until 1935, when he joined Time, Inc. In 1940, William Saroyan listed him among "contributing editors" at Time in the play, Love's Old Sweet Song.

During World War II, Sherrod covered the Pacific War for TIME and LIFE magazines – accompanying the Marines into battle at Attu (with the U.S. Army), Tarawa, Saipan, Iwo Jima, and Okinawa. After witnessing the carnage at Tarawa, Sherrod was instrumental in advising President Roosevelt to air the controversial documentary With the Marines at Tarawa. Sherrod was one of only a few who were at Tarawa that the President knew personally and could trust to advise him on this matter from the point of view of the Marines on the ground.

In 1943, the Tarawa atoll of the Gilbert Islands was occupied by the Japanese. Sherrod accompanied the U.S. Marines from their landing on the shores until the battle was over. His book on the battle, Tarawa: The Story of a Battle, was published 1944, at which time he was an associate editor of TIME.

Sherrod was also with the Marines during the invasion of Iwo Jima. He wrote, "at the end of a fortnight's bloody fighting there is no longer any doubt that Iwo is the most difficult amphibious operation in U.S. history." He later wrote the book On to Westward: The Battles of Saipan and Iwo Jima about his experiences on Saipan and Iwo Jima. Unfortunately, Sherrod also admitted to being responsible for spreading the rumor that Joe Rosenthal's famous photograph of the Marines' second flag raising on Mount Suribachi was "staged"; he later confessed that he was wrong and apologized.. In 1944 he was also responsible for repeating and amplifying the spurious charges of Marine General Holland Smith that the Army performed poorly during the invasion of Saipan, claiming in a September 1944 Time magazine article that a regiment of the 27th division "froze in their foxholes" during the gyokusai attack of 6–7 July, reigniting the controversy and further damaging Marine/Army relations.

He was later a war correspondent in Korea and in Vietnam.

Sherrod was the managing editor for the Saturday Evening Post from 1955 to 1962, then editor from 1962 to 1965. He was vice president of the Post's parent company, Curtis Publishing Company, from 1965 to 1966.

== Death ==
Sherrod died in his home in Washington, D.C., from emphysema on February 13, 1994.

== Works ==
In addition to his work as a war correspondent and editor, Sherrod authored five books on the military, including:

- Tarawa: The Story of a Battle. Duell Sloan and Pearce. 1944. ISBN 0-934841-14-4.
- On to Westward: The Battles of Saipan and Iwo Jima. 1945.
- History of Marine Corps Aviation in World War II. 1952.

He also worked with NASA on a book about the Apollo missions:

- Cortright, E. M. (1975). "Chapter 8: Men for the Moon — How they were chosen and trained". Apollo Expeditions to the Moon. Edgar M. Cortright (editor). NASA.

== See also ==
- Richard Tregaskis, American war correspondent for the International News Service, with the Marines on Battle of Guadalcanal, author of Guadalcanal Diary.
- WWII in HD: Lost Films, ( Voice by Rob Lowe) is a documentary to show World War II as it really was, in original, immersive colour.

Ray E. Boomhower's book Dispatches from the Pacific: The World War II Reporting of Robert L. Sherrod, was published in August 2017 by Indiana University Press.
