= Ann Wroe =

English author and columnist

Ann Wroe FRSL
- Education: University of Oxford
- Occupations: Author and columnist
- Employer: The Economist
- Notable work: Orpheus: The Song of Life (2011); Six Facets of Light (2016)

Ann Wroe FRSL is an English author and columnist who has been the obituaries editor of The Economist since 2003.

== Education and career ==
After taking a first-class degree in History, Wroe received a doctorate in medieval history from the University of Oxford in 1975. After completing her university education, she worked at the BBC World Service covering French and Italian news.

Wroe began working at The Economist, the weekly newspaper, in 1976. In her tenure she has held the position of Books and Arts editor, from 1988 to 1992, and US Editor, from 1992 to 2000. Since 2003, Wroe has been the Obituaries editor at The Economist, which typically publishes one obituary in each print issue. Obituaries Wroe has written include subjects Hunter S. Thompson, Arthur Miller, Prince, Paul Newman, and Osama bin Laden. Wroe also writes a column in The Economist's bi-monthly cultural magazine 1843 and has edited The Economist's style guide.

A collection of obituaries written by Wroe and previous Obituaries editor Keith Colquhoun was published in 2008.

== Other writing ==
Wroe has published several non-fiction books including biographies of Pontius Pilate, Percy Shelley, and Perkin Warbeck. Her biography of Pilate was shortlisted for the 1999 Samuel Johnson Prize. Her 2011 book on the subject of the mythological figure of Orpheus, entitled Orpheus: The Song of Life, won the London Hellenic Prize (then called the Criticos Prize), and was described by John Banville as "a book of wonders, learned, playful and passionate." In 2016, her book Six Facets of Light, a collection of meditations on light as well as the observations of other writers and thinkers, was named a Spectator Book of the Year. Wroe has also written book reviews for The Telegraph. English author Hilary Mantel described Wroe as one of the "most underrated" contemporary writers.

Wroe became a Fellow of the Royal Society of Literature in 2007. She is also a Fellow of the Royal Historical Society.

== Publications ==
- Lives, Lies, and the Iran-Contra Affair, I.B. Tauris (New York, NY), 1991
- A Fool and His Money: Life in a Partitioned Town in Fourteenth-Century France, Hill & Wang (New York, NY), 1995
- Pilate: The Biography of an Invented Man, Vintage (London, England), 2000, also published as Pontius Pilate, Modern Library (New York, NY), 2000.
- Perkin: A Story of Deception, Jonathan Cape (London, England), 2003, also published as The Perfect Prince: The Mystery of Perkin Warbeck and His Quest for the Throne of England, Random House (New York, NY), 2003
- Being Shelley: The Poet's Search for Himself, Pantheon Books (New York, NY), 2007
- The Economist Book of Obituaries (co-author with Keith Colquhoun), Profile (UK), 2008
- Orpheus: The Song of Life, Jonathan Cape (London), 2011
- "Resolutions, Destinations: Shelley's Last Year" (book chapter) in The Oxford Handbook of Percy Bysshe Shelley, eds. Michael O'Neill and Anthony Howe, Oxford University Press (Oxford), 2013
- Six Facets of Light, Jonathan Cape (London, England), 2016
- Francis, A Life in Songs, Jonathan Cape (London, England), 2018
