= The Big Picture (Carroll book) =

2016 book by Sean M. Carroll

The Big Picture: On the Origins of Life, Meaning, and the Universe Itself
- Hardcover edition
- Author: Sean M. Carroll
- Language: English
- Subject: Poetic naturalism
- Genre: Non-fiction
- Publisher: Dutton
- Publication date: May 10, 2016
- Publication place: United States
- Media type: Print, e-book, audiobook
- Pages: 480 pp.
- ISBN: 978-0525954828
- OCLC: 999399320
- Preceded by: The Particle at the End of the Universe
- Followed by: Something Deeply Hidden
- Website: Official website

The Big Picture: On the Origins of Life, Meaning, and the Universe Itself is a non-fiction book by American theoretical physicist Sean M. Carroll. The book was published on May 10, 2016, by Dutton. In his fourth book, Carroll defends the argument that the universe can be completely interpreted by science, introducing "poetic naturalism" as a philosophy that explains the world.

== Reception ==
Writing for The Guardian, Tim Radford commented, "Carroll builds up his narrative in brief, very readable chapters, a precept, an axiom or a physical law at a time. Naturalism – he doesn’t favour the word atheism – defines the world entirely in terms of physical forces, fields and entities, and these forces and fields are unforgiving: they do not permit telekinesis, psychic powers, miracles, life after death or an immortal soul." Robert P. Crease in his review for Nature praised The Big Picture for its ambition and directness while finding Carroll's treatment of philosophical topics unsatisfyingly shallow:

Carroll confidently defines many concepts, including belief and consciousness, as if 2,500 years of philosophy have yielded little relevant to the subject; he dismisses the task of drawing careful distinctions and heeding subtleties as "ontologically fastidious". All he finds in philosophical literature are a few interesting puzzles. It's like getting a whirlwind tour of a city from a tour guide who doesn't live there, but enthusiastically gives you capsule descriptions of favourite sites.

A reviewer of Publishers Weekly wrote, "Much of the material here will be new to many readers, but regardless of familiarity, Carroll presents a means through which people can better understand themselves, their universe, and their conceptions of a meaningful life." A reviewer of Kirkus Reviews added, "Carroll is the perfect guide on this wondrous journey of discovery. A brilliantly lucid exposition of profound philosophical and scientific issues in a language accessible to lay readers."

== Poetic naturalism ==
Carroll terms his overall philosophical approach poetic naturalism, aiming by this term to suggest a type of naturalism which encourages a variety of ways to talk about the world, using language dependent upon the aspect of reality being discussed. Poetic naturalism acknowledges that the methods and terms used within one domain may not be coherent with those of another domain, yet both can be considered valid representations of reality.

Carroll claims that poetic naturalism resolves many of the conflicts caused by the fundamental differences between the various branches of science and philosophy. For example, the universe can be described mechanically in terms of atoms obeying certain laws. This results in a deterministic universe incompatible with the concepts of choice or free will. In spite of determinism, humans can be said to make decisions and control aspects of their environment. This apparent conflict does not negate either viewpoint; they can both be said to be legitimate depending on the frame of reference in which we are currently operating.

While naturalism is the "idea or belief that only natural (as opposed to supernatural or spiritual) laws and forces operate in the world", poetic naturalism understands that the way we find personally relevant meaning to life does not naturally emerge from a purely scientific approach. Science is a rigorous method of finding what is true or false, while poetic naturalism encourages extending the conversation to include contemplation into what is right and wrong. It integrates scientific reasoning methods into our personal purpose-seeking and meaning-making, with an emphasis on Bayesian techniques.

== See also ==
- Liberal naturalism
