= Sean M. Carroll =

American theoretical physicist (born 1966)

- Carroll in 2026
- Born: Sean Michael Carroll; October 5, 1966 (age 60); Philadelphia, Pennsylvania, U.S.
- Education: Villanova University (BS); Harvard University (PhD)
- Known for: Poetic naturalism; Spacetime and Geometry (2003)
- Spouse: Jennifer Ouellette (m. 2007)
- Awards: Royal Society Science Book Prize (2013); Andrew Gemant Award (2014); Guggenheim Fellowship (2015); Trotter Prize (2024); Klopsteg Memorial Award (2025)
- Scientific career
- Fields: General relativity; Astrophysics; Cosmology
- Workplaces: California Institute of Technology; Santa Fe Institute; Johns Hopkins University
- Thesis: Cosmological Consequences of Topological and Geometric Phenomena in Field Theories (1993)
- Doctoral advisor: George B. Field
- Website: www.preposterousuniverse.com

Sean Michael Carroll (born October 5, 1966) is an American theoretical physicist who specializes in quantum mechanics, cosmology, and the philosophy of science. He is the Homewood Professor of Natural Philosophy at Johns Hopkins University. He was formerly a research professor at the Walter Burke Institute for Theoretical Physics at the California Institute of Technology (Caltech). He also is currently an external professor at the Santa Fe Institute. He is known for his atheism, his vocal critique of theism and defense of naturalism.

Carroll is the author of Spacetime And Geometry, a graduate-level textbook in general relativity, and has also recorded lectures for The Great Courses on cosmology, time in physics and the Higgs boson. He is also the author of four popular books.

In 2018, Carroll began a podcast called Mindscape. He has also published a YouTube video series entitled "The Biggest Ideas in the Universe" which provides physics instruction at a popular-science level but with equations and a mathematical basis. The series has become the basis of a new book series with the installment, The Biggest Ideas in the Universe: Space, Time, and Motion, published in September 2022 and the second volume, Quanta and Fields, published in May 2024, with the third and final volume pending publication.

== Career ==
Carroll received his PhD in astronomy in 1993 from Harvard University, where his advisor was George B. Field. His dissertation was entitled Cosmological Consequences of Topological and Geometric Phenomena in Field Theories. He worked as a postdoctoral researcher at the Massachusetts Institute of Technology (MIT) and Kavli Institute for Theoretical Physics at the University of California, Santa Barbara, and as an assistant professor at the University of Chicago until 2006 when he was denied tenure. From 2006 until 2022, he was a Research Professor of Physics at California Institute of Technology. In 2022, he was named the Homewood Professor of Natural Philosophy at Johns Hopkins University, teaching in both the Department of Philosophy and the Department of Physics and Astronomy.

Carroll has a B.S. in astronomy, Astrophysics and Philosophy from Villanova University in Pennsylvania.

In 2010, Carroll was elected fellow of the American Physical Society for "contributions to a wide variety of subjects in cosmology, relativity and quantum field theory, especially ideas for cosmic acceleration, as well as contributions to undergraduate, graduate and public science education". In 2014, he was awarded the Andrew Gemant Award by the American Institute of Physics for "significant contributions to the cultural, artistic or humanistic dimension of physics". In 2015, he was awarded a Guggenheim Fellowship.

Carroll hosts the podcast series Mindscape, and The Biggest Ideas in the Universe. He also delivers public speeches and gets engaged in public debates in a wide variety of topics.

Carroll has appeared on numerous television shows including The Colbert Report and Through the Wormhole. He also worked as a consultant in several movies like Avengers: Endgame and Thor: The Dark World. Besides consulting, Carroll worked as a voice actor in Earth to Echo.

== Personal life ==
Carroll is married to Jennifer Ouellette, a science writer and the former director of the Science & Entertainment Exchange. They have two cats, Ariel and Caliban.

== Research ==
Carroll has worked on a number of areas of theoretical cosmology, field theory and gravitation theory. His research papers include models of, and experimental constraints on, violations of Lorentz invariance; the appearance of closed timelike curves in general relativity; varieties of topological defects in field theory; and cosmological dynamics of extra spacetime dimensions. He has written extensively on models of dark energy and its interactions with ordinary matter and dark matter, as well as modifications of general relativity in cosmology. He has also worked on the foundations of quantum mechanics, especially the many-worlds interpretation, including a derivation of the Born rule for probabilities.

Carroll has also worked on the arrow of time problem. He and Jennifer Chen posit that the Big Bang is not a unique occurrence where all of the matter and energy in the universe originated in a singularity at the beginning of time, but rather one of many cosmic inflation events resulting from quantum fluctuations of vacuum energy in a cold de Sitter space. They claim that the universe is infinitely old but never reaches thermodynamic equilibrium as entropy increases continuously without limit due to the decreasing matter and energy density attributable to recurrent cosmic inflation. They assert that the universe is "statistically time-symmetric", insofar as it contains equal progressions of time "both forward and backward". Some of his work has been on violations of fundamental symmetries, the physics of dark energy, modifications of general relativity and the arrow of time. Recently he started focusing on issues at the foundations of cosmology, statistical mechanics, quantum mechanics and complexity.

In 2017, Carroll presented an argument for rejecting certain cosmological models, including those with Boltzmann brains, on the basis that they are cognitively unstable: they cannot simultaneously be true and justifiably believed. The article was solicited as a contribution to a larger work on Current Controversies in Philosophy of Science.

== Philosophical and religious views ==
Carroll, while raised as an Episcopalian, is an atheist, or as he calls it, a "poetic naturalist". He turned down an invitation to speak at a conference sponsored by the John Templeton Foundation, because he did not want to appear to be supporting a reconciliation between science and religion. In 2004, he and Shadi Bartsch taught an undergraduate course at the University of Chicago on the history of atheism. In 2012, he organized the workshop "Moving Naturalism Forward", which brought together scientists and philosophers to discuss issues associated with a naturalistic worldview. His article "Does the Universe Need God?" in The Blackwell Companion to Science and Christianity develops the claim that science no longer needs to posit a divine being to explain the existence of the universe. The article generated significant attention when it was discussed on The Huffington Post. Carroll received an "Emperor Has No Clothes" award at the Freedom From Religion Foundation Annual National Convention in October 2014.

His 2016 book The Big Picture: On the Origins of Life, Meaning and the Universe Itself develops the philosophy of poetic naturalism, the term he is credited with coining. The book talks about wide range of topics such as submicroscopic components of the universe, whether human existence can have meaning without God—and everything between the two.

Carroll's speeches on the philosophy of religion also generate interest as his speeches are often responded to and talked about by philosophers and apologists. Carroll believes that thinking like a scientist leads one to the conclusion that God does not exist. Carroll thinks that over four centuries of scientific progress have convinced most professional philosophers and scientists of the validity of naturalism. Carroll also asserts that the term methodological naturalism is an inaccurate characterization of science, that science is not characterized by methodological naturalism but by methodological empiricism.

Carroll is a vocal atheist who has debated with Christian apologists such as Dinesh D'Souza and William Lane Craig. He occasionally takes part in formal debates and discussions about scientific, religious and philosophical topics with a variety of people. Politically, Carroll has expressed his opposition to Donald Trump. He wrote ahead of the 2016 United States presidential election that "[Trump] has continually vilified immigrants and foreigners generally, promoting an us-against-them mentality between people of different races and ethnicities" and that he posed a threat to liberal democratic values.

== Debates, dialogues and discussions ==
Carroll has been involved in numerous public debates and discussions with other academics and commentators. In 2012, he gathered a number of well-known academics from a variety of backgrounds for a three-day seminar titled "Moving Naturalism Forward". The participants were Steven Weinberg, Richard Dawkins, Daniel C. Dennett, Jerry Coyne, Simon DeDeo, Massimo Pigliucci, Janna Levin, Owen Flanagan, Rebecca Goldstein, David Poeppel, Alex Rosenberg, Terrence Deacon and Don Ross with James Ladyman.

Also in 2012, Carroll teamed up with Michael Shermer to debate with Ian Hutchinson of MIT and author Dinesh D'Souza at Caltech in an event titled "The Great Debate: Has Science Refuted Religion?"

In 2014, Carroll participated in a highly anticipated debate with philosopher and Christian apologist William Lane Craig as part of the Greer-Heard Forum in New Orleans. The topic of debate was "The Existence of God in Light of Contemporary Cosmology". In a podcast in 2018, Sam Harris engaged with Carroll. They discussed consciousness, the many-worlds interpretation of quantum mechanics, the arrow of time, free will, facts and values, and other topics including moral realism.

Also in 2014, Carroll partook in a debate held by Intelligence Squared, the title of the debate was "Death is Not Final". Carroll teamed up with Steven Novella, a neurologist by profession known for his skepticism, and the two argued against the motion. Their adversaries were Eben Alexander, neurosurgeon and an author, and Raymond Moody, a philosopher, author, psychologist and physician.

In 2016, he delivered the Gifford Lectures on The Big Picture: On the Origins of Life, Meaning, and the Universe Itself at the University of Glasgow.

In 2017, Carroll took part in a discussion with B. Alan Wallace, a Buddhist scholar and a former monk who had been ordained by the Dalai Lama. It was organized by an institution sponsored by the John Templeton Foundation. In this public dialogue, they discussed the nature of reality from spiritual and scientific viewpoints.

In 2018, Carroll and Roger Penrose held a symposium on the subject of The Big Bang and Creation Myths.

== Selected publications ==
- Carroll, Sean (2003). Spacetime and Geometry: An Introduction to General Relativity. Addison Wesley. ISBN 0-8053-8732-3. Reprinted 2019.
- Carroll, Sean (2010). From Eternity to Here: The Quest for the Ultimate Theory of Time. Dutton. ISBN 978-0-525-95133-9. It tackles a fundamental open principle in physics: the arrow of time.
- Carroll, Sean (2012). The Particle at the End of the Universe: How the Hunt for the Higgs Boson Leads Us to the Edge of a New World. Dutton. ISBN 978-0-525-95359-3. It describes the hunt for and discovery of the Higgs boson at the Large Hadron Collider at CERN and was the 2013 winner of the Royal Society Winton Prize for Science Books.
- Carroll, Sean (2016). The Big Picture: On the Origins of Life, Meaning, and the Universe Itself. Penguin. ISBN 978-0-5259-5482-8., where Carroll introduces the concept of poetic naturalism.
- Carroll, Sean (2019). Something Deeply Hidden: Quantum Worlds and the Emergence of Spacetime. Penguin. ISBN 978-1-5247-4301-7.
- Carroll, Sean (2022). The Biggest Ideas in the Universe: Space, Time, and Motion. Penguin. ISBN 978-0-5931-8658-9.
- Carroll, Sean (2024). Quanta and Fields: The Biggest Ideas in the Universe. Dutton. ISBN 9780593186602.
- Research publication list, from the INSPIRE-HEP digital library.

== See also ==
- List of cosmologists
- List of physicists
- Brian Greene
- Max Tegmark
- Daniel Dennett
- Neil deGrasse Tyson
