= Samuel Pepys: The Unequalled Self =

2002 book by Claire Tomalin

- Author: Claire Tomalin
- Subject: The life of Samuel Pepys
- Published: 2002
- Publisher: Viking
- Media type: book
- Pages: 499

Samuel Pepys: The Unequalled Self is a 2002 historical biography by Claire Tomalin. It charts the life of Samuel Pepys, a 17th-century English diarist and naval administrator. The main source for the biography is the diary which Pepys wrote between 1660 and 1669, though Tomalin also draws in various other sources, including letters and other contemporary records.

== Background ==
Pepys was the seventh subject for the biographer, Claire Tomalin, who had previously written biographies of writers including Mary Wollstonecraft, Katherine Mansfield, Percy Shelley and Jane Austen. Before Tomalin's biography, recent studies of Pepys had included Samuel Pepys: A Life by Stephen Coote (2000) and Samuel Pepys and His World, by Geoffrey Trease (1972).

== Reception ==
The book was generally reviewed positively. The Guardian's Joanna Griffiths felt that Tomalin could have included more of Pepys' words from the diary. Griffiths wrote that Pepys was a difficult subject for a biographer due to his diary revealing so much of himself, and also due to the comparative lack of sources for periods of his life before and after the diary. Griffiths describes the biography as "notable for its generosity to the Pepysian fan". Reviewing for the New York Times, Charles McGrath also stated that "You don't always hear as much of Pepys himself as you would like", but also called Tomalin "an excellent summarizer".

The Unequalled Self won the 2002 Whitbread Book of the Year award in the biography and overall sections.
