= Edgar Vincent =

American publicist and actor (1918–2008)

Edgar Vincent visits with longtime client Risë Stevens.

Edgar Vincent (13 March 1918, Hamburg — 26 June 2008, New York City) was an American publicist and actor of German birth. He began his career appearing in small roles in Hollywood films during the 1940s but his German accent prevented him from moving further with his career. In 1949 he joined a New York publishing firm with his first client being the opera singer Ezio Pinza. He went on to specialize in being a publicist for opera singers, helping shape and forward the careers of major stars like Lily Pons, Anna Moffo, Eleanor Steber, Jussi Björling, George London, Leonard Warren, Mirella Freni, Shirley Verrett, Cecilia Bartoli, Dolora Zajick, Dorothy Kirsten, Eileen Farrell, Birgit Nilsson, Rise Stevens and Salvatore Licitra. He had a particularly close friendship and relationship with the late Beverly Sills and was also a close friend and adviser to Plácido Domingo in addition to being his publicist. Vincent also worked for Mikhail Baryshnikov and a handful of musicians other than opera singers, including conductors Erich Leinsdorf, Leopold Stokowski and Georg Solti; the cellist Mstislav Rostropovich; and the violinist Isaac Stern. He also worked frequently with his colleague, fellow publicist Margaret Carson.
