= Tiffany Jenkins =

British sociologist, cultural commentator and writer

- Occupations: Author, journalist, academic
- Spouse: Iain Macwhirter
- Writing career
- Notable works: Contesting Human Remains in Museum Collections: The Crisis of Cultural Authority; Political Culture, Soft Interventions and Nation Building; Keeping Their Marbles
- Website: tiffanyjenkinsinfo.com

Tiffany Jenkins is a British sociologist, cultural commentator and writer, and culture editor for the journal Sociology Compass.

== Career ==
She is the author of Contesting Human Remains in Museum Collections (2011), which looks at the influences at play on the controversy over human remains in museum collections; and of Keeping Their Marbles (2016), which examines the controversies surrounding the Parthenon Marbles, and the wider debate on the repatriation of cultural heritage. However, Jenkins' arguments have been described by experts in the field as "clumsy and shallow, and on occasion misleading" in addition to contributing to "the normalization of extremist discourse" in museology. In spite of this, Jenkins has continued to argue that western museums should not return said treasures.

She is editor of a multi-authored book of essays, Political Culture, Soft Interventions and Nation Building (2015), which examines the act of cultural intervention in countries that have been devastated by conflict.

She is a regular contributor to the broadsheet press on the arts and cultural issues, including a column for The Scotsman newspaper.

Jenkins is an Honorary Fellow in the Department of Art History at the University of Edinburgh. She was previously a visiting fellow at the London School of Economics, and arts and society director of the Institute of Ideas.

In March 2025, she was appointed a trustee of the British Museum.

== Bibliography ==
- Jenkins, Tiffany (2011). Contesting Human Remains in Museum Collections: the crisis of cultural authority. New York: Routledge. ISBN 9780415879606.
- Jenkins, Tiffany (2012). "'Who are we to decide?' The targeting of professional authority in the contestation over human remains in British museums". Journal of Cultural Sociology. 6: 455–470. doi:10.1177/1749975512445432. S2CID 145065156.
- Jenkins, Tiffany (2013). "Old Skeletons, Pagans and Museums: why human remains are a bone of contention". In Best, Joel; Harris, Scott R. (eds.). Making Sense of Social Problems: New Images, New Issues. Boulder, Co.: Lynne Reinner. pp. 91–106. ISBN 9781588268556.
- Jenkins, Tiffany, ed. (2015). Political Culture, Soft Interventions and Nation Building. London: Routledge. ISBN 9781138793569.
- Jenkins, Tiffany (2016). Keeping Their Marbles: how the treasures of the past ended up in museums – and why they should stay there. Oxford: Oxford University Press. ISBN 9780199657599.
