= Manjit Kumar =

Writer

Manjit Kumar (born 1963) is a science writer. He wrote the popular science book Quantum which was shortlisted for the BBC Samuel Johnson Prize for Non-Fiction, 2009. He was also co-author of the book Science and the Retreat from Reason. He has degrees in physics and philosophy. He is the former Consulting Science Editor of Wired UK.

He lives in north London and is married with two sons.

== Journalism ==
He has written for many newspapers, websites and magazines.

- Daily Telegraph
- Financial Times
- The Guardian
- The Independent
- Literary Review
- Nature.com
- New Humanist
- New Scientist
- Sunday Telegraph
- Tehelka
- The Times
- Wall Street Journal

== Prometheus ==
Prometheus was a short lived journal that covered the arts and sciences, that was edited by Manjit Kumar along with fellow associate Pandora Kay-Kreizman. Its first two issues had appeared by late 1999. Issue 3 was published in March 2000. and Issue 4—the final issue—around March 2001.

- Prometheus 1
- Prometheus 2
- Prometheus 3
- Prometheus 4
