= Suketu Mehta =

New York-based author

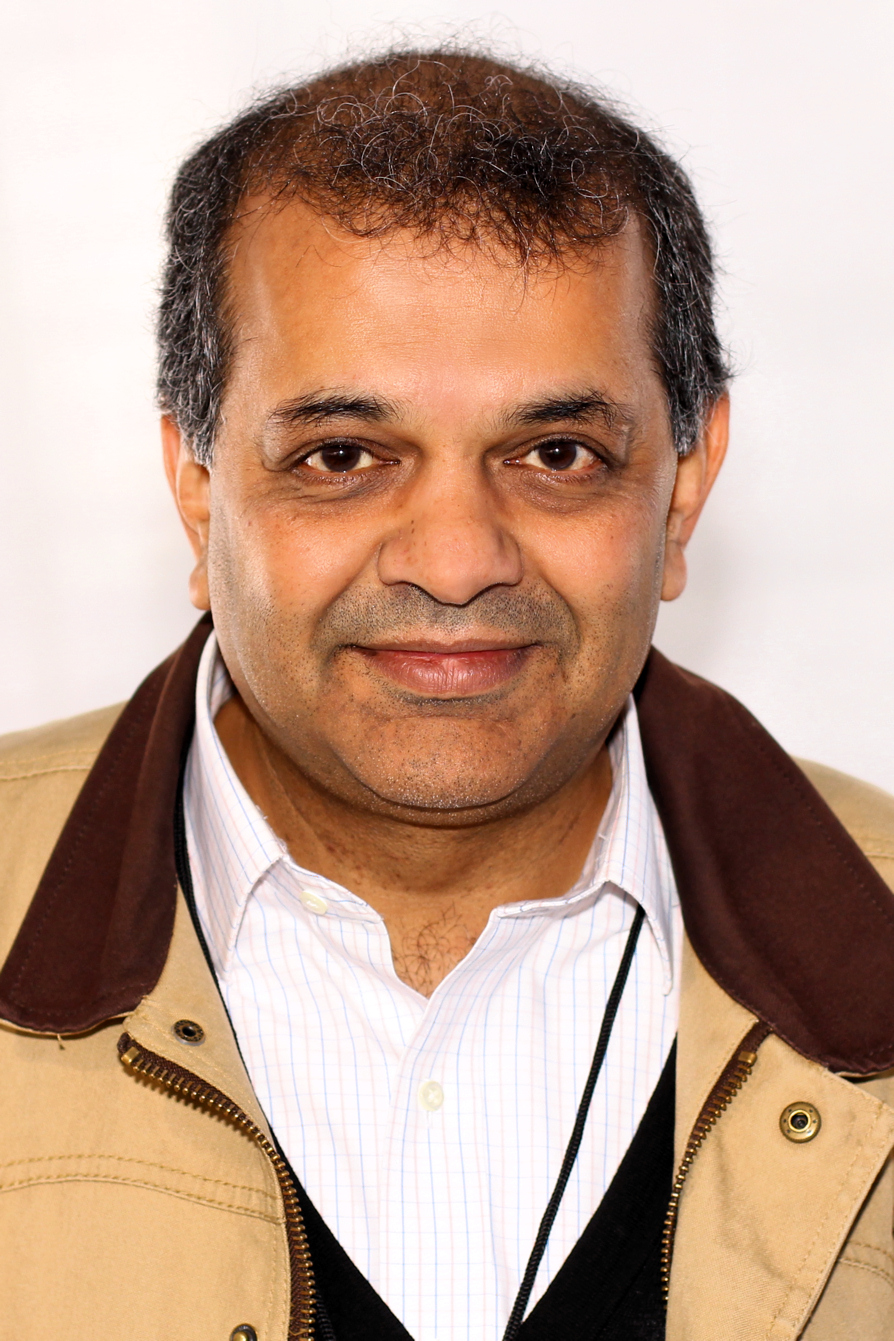
- Mehta at the 2019 Texas Book Festival
- Born: Calcutta, India
- Writing career
- Notable awards: Kiriyama Prize, Whiting Award

Suketu Mehta is the New York-based author of Maximum City: Bombay Lost and Found, which won the Kiriyama Prize and the Hutch Crossword Award, and was a finalist for the 2005 Pulitzer Prize, the Lettre Ulysses Prize, the BBC4 Samuel Johnson Prize, and the Guardian First Book Award. His autobiographical account of his experiences in Mumbai, Maximum City, was published in 2004. The book, based on two and a half years of research, explores the underbelly of the city.

He has won a New York Foundation for the Arts Fellowship for his fiction. Mehta’s work has been published in The New Yorker, The New York Times Magazine, National Geographic, Granta, Harper’s, Time, Newsweek, The New York Review of Books and Scroll.in, and has been featured on NPR’s Fresh Air, and NPR's All Things Considered. Mehta has also written original screenplays for films, including New York, I Love You (2008) and Mission Kashmir (2000) with novelist Vikram Chandra.

His latest book This Land Is Our Land: An Immigrant's Manifesto, was published in June 2019 under a 2007 Guggenheim fellowship. A forthright defense of immigrants, both legal and illegal, in the wake of colonialism, the book argued that "the West has forced people to become migrants. The right to migrate is overdue reparation for those centuries of degradation and exploitation."

== Personal life ==
Mehta was born in Kolkata, India, to Gujarati parents and raised in Mumbai, where he lived until his family moved to New York City in 1977. He is a graduate of New York University and the University of Iowa Writers' Workshop.

Mehta is an associate professor of journalism at New York University and lives in Manhattan.

== Awards ==
- He won a Whiting Award in 1997.
- He won the O. Henry Prize for his short story Gare du Nord published in Harper's Magazine in 1997.
- He won a Fellowship of the New York Foundation for the Arts.
- He won a 2007 Guggenheim Fellowship.
- 2005 Pulitzer Prize finalist for the book Maximum City.
- Maximum City was also chosen as one of the books of the year 2004 by The Economist.
- Maximum City won the 2005 Kiriyama Prize.

== Works ==
- Mehta, Suketu (15 August 2013). "In the Violent Favelas of Brazil". The New York Review of Books. 60 (13).
- Maximum City: Bombay Lost and Found. Knopf. 2004. ISBN 978-0-67004-921-9.
- This Land Is Our Land: An Immigrant's Manifesto. Farrar, Straus and Giroux. 2019. ISBN 978-0-37427-602-7

== Filmography ==
=== As writer ===
Year	Film	Director	Notes
2000	Mission Kashmir	Vidhu Vinod Chopra	
2008	8	Mira Nair	Segment "How Can It Be?"
2008	New York, I Love You	Mira Nair	Segment 2

== See also ==
- Lists of American writers
- List of Indian writers
