= International Rubery Book Award =

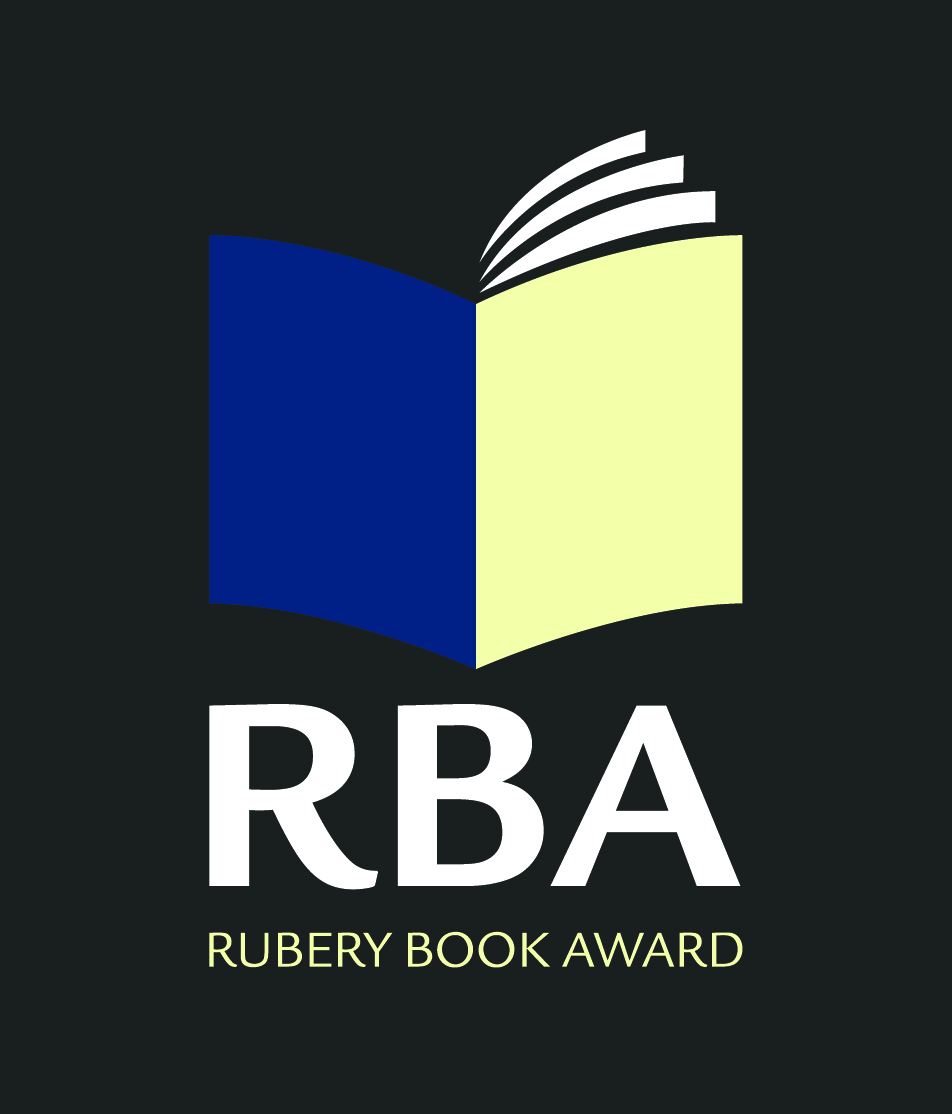
Rubery Book Award Rubery Book Award
- Awarded for: Best self published or indie book written in the English language.
- Website: www.ruberybookaward.com

The Rubery Book Award was founded in 2010, and it is the largest cash award for books independently published or self published in Great Britain. The London Review of Books described it as "independent publishing's response to the Booktrust and the Orange Prize." The Alliance of Independent Authors states, "holders of the respected Rubery Award [...] should be considered to have a quality endorsement."

In 2012 the award attracted submissions from five continents. In 2015 entries were received from twenty countries: Australia, Canada, China, Finland, Germany, Ghana, Greece, Ireland, Israel, Japan, New Zealand, Nigeria, Norway, Portugal, Saudi Arabia, Spain, Sweden, Switzerland, the UK, and the USA.

== Judges ==
Past and current judges include the following people.

- Judith Allnatt, a writer of short stories and novels
- Gaynor Arnold, long listed author for the Booker Prize and the Women's Prize for Fiction
- Simon Cheshire, children's author
- Ann Evans, children's author
- William Gallagher , author, lecturer, and playwright who writes Doctor Who audio dramas, stage plays, and has British journalism experience
- Laura Longrigg, literary agent
- Alan Mahar, cofounder and publisher of Tindal Street Press, writer of short stories and novels
- Paul McDonald, teacher of creative writing teacher, editor, and writer of poetry, short stories, novels, and literary criticism
- Chris Morgan, creative writing teacher and former Birmingham's Poet Laureate
- Pauline Morgan, judge for the Arthur C. Clarke Award
- Clare Morrall, short listed author for the Booker Prize
- Jeff Phelps, Poet and Stand winner

== Successes ==
- Jacob M Appel, the 2013 book winner, has had many short stories published in literary journals. He also won Dundee International Book Prize which published his debut novel, The Man Who Wouldn't Stand Up.
- Angela Readman, the 2015 book winner, has had much success. She won the Costa Short Story Award in 2013, won the Saboteur Awards 2015, and was short listed for the Edgehill Prize 2016.
- Melanie Whipman, the 2012 short story winner, has had stories subsequently read on BBC Radio 4. She was also listed in 2017 for the Edgehill Prize.

== Winners ==
Year	Author	Title	Category
2011	Sarah James	Into the Yell	Poetry
2011	Lindsay Stanberry–Flynn	Unravelling	Fiction
2011 Winner	Christine Donovan	Jump Derry,	Fiction
2012	Carol Mead and Gareth Davies	Sea Things	Children's Poetry
2012	Ann Victoria Roberts	The Master's Tale	Fiction
2012 Winner	Daniela Murphy	The Restorer	Fiction
2013	Sophie Neville	Funnily Enough	Non-Fiction
2013	T. D. Griggs	Redemption Blues	Fiction
2013 Winner	Jacob M. Appel	The Man Who Wouldn't Stand Up	Fiction
2014	Peter Reason	Spindrift	Non-Fiction
2014	JoeAnn Hart	Float	Fiction
2014 Winner	Victor Tapner	Flatlands	Poetry
2015	Diana Kimpton	The Green Sheep	Children's
2015	Jo Riccion	The Italians at Cleat's Corner Store	Fiction
2015	Sasha Harding	A Brush with the Coast	Non Fiction
2015	Diana Whitney	Wanting It	Poetry
Book of the Year 2015	Angela Readman	Don't Try this at Home	Short Stories
2016	Lisa Woollett	Sea Journal	Non Fiction
2016	Annie Dawid	York Ferry	Fiction
2016	Emma Purshouse and Catherine Pascall Moore	I Once Knew a Poem Who Wore a Hat	Children's Poetry
Book of the Year 2016	Laura Tisdall	Echoes	YA
2017	Lena Adishian and Nareg Seferian	Impact of an Ancient Nation	Non Fiction
2017	Melanie Whipman	Llama Sutra	Short stories
2017	Debbie Wise	Rosie and Rufus	Children's
2017	John Toomey	Slipping	Fiction
Book of the Year 2017	Jaq Hazell	My Life as a Bench	YA
2018	Keith Chandler	The Goldsmith's Apprentice	Poetry
2018	Jenny Morris; illustrated by Sara Hayat	The Thing on Mount Spring	Illustrated Children's
2018	R. K. Salters	Butterfly Ranch	Fiction
2018	Wendy Storer	Bring Me Sunshine	YA
Book of the Year 2018	David P Miraldi	The Edge of Innocence	Non Fiction
2019	Jacob M Appel	Amazing Thins are Happening Here	Short Stories
2019	Chad Alan Gibbs	Two Like Me and You	YA
2019	Oz Hardwick	Learning to Have Lost	Poetry
2019	Lisa Anne Novelline; Nicola Hwang	Piccadilly and the Jolly Raindrops	Children's
Book of the Year 2019	Claire Chao and Isabel Sun Chao	Remembering Shanghai	Non Fiction
2020	Stef Gemmill; illustrated by Mel Armstrong	A Home for Luna	Children's

== Short Story Winners ==
- Sarah Evans "The Tipping Point" (2011)
- Melanie Whipman "Peacock Girl" (2012)
- Gill Blow "On the Bench" (2013)
- Gregory J Wolos "Still Life" (2014)
