= List of winners of the Dundee International Book Prize =

This is a list of winners of the Dundee International Book Prize by year.

== List ==
Year	Author	Title	Genre(s)	Nationality
2000	Andrew Murray Scott	Tumulus	Novel	United Kingdom
2002	Claire-Marie Watson	The Curewife	Novel	United Kingdom
2005	Malcolm Archibald	Whales for the Wizard	Novel	United Kingdom
2007	Fiona Dunscombe	The Triple Point of Water	Novel	United Kingdom
2009	Chris Longmuir	Dead Wood	Novel	United Kingdom
2010	Alan Wright	Act of Murder	Novel	United Kingdom
2011	Simon Ashe-Brown	Nothing Human Left	Novel	United Kingdom
2012	Jacob M. Appel	The Man Who Wouldn't Stand Up	Novel	United States
2013	Nicola White	In the Rosary Garden	Novel	Ireland
2014	Amy Mason	The Other Ida	Novel	United Kingdom
2015	Martin Cathcart Froden	Devil Take the Hindmost	Novel	Sweden
2016	Jessica Thummel	The Cure for Lonely	Novel	United States

== 2000 ==
Andrew Murray Scott's book Tumulus (inaugural winner 2000) detailed bohemian Dundee through the 60s and 70s to the present day. The judges said that it "reveals a great knowledge and love of Dundee while paying the city the compliment of being intelligently amused by various aspects of its life and outlook".

== 2002 ==
Claire-Marie Watson's The Curewife (2002) drew on the tale of Dundee's last execution of a witch – Grissel Jaffray in 1669. Hilary Mantel said that it won as it had a "highly charged atmosphere and its real sense of the dark and brooding".

== 2005 ==
Malcolm Archibald's Whales for a Wizard (2005) was an adventure story based around the whaling industry in Dundee in the 1860s. It was called an "old-fashioned, traditional, rip-roaring adventure story" by Ian Rankin.

== 2007 ==
Fiona Dunscombe's The Triple Point of Water (2007) drew on her experiences of working in Soho during the 1980s.

== 2009 ==
Chris Longmuir's Dead Wood (2009) was a grizzly crime novel set in a world of violence and gangland retribution. The List calls it "lacklustre", "Flat and clunky", and "a poor addition to the Scottish crime genre".

== 2010 ==
Alan Wright's Act of Murder (2010) was a tale of magic, poisonings and thespians, with some gruesome murders thrown in for good measure set in Victorian times in Lancashire. It was called a "worthy winner for a prize" in a review by Fife Today.

== 2011 ==
Simon Ashe-Browne's Nothing Human Left (2011) was a psychological thriller set in a Dublin public school as a schoolboy's criminal desires reach a frightening conclusion.

== 2012 ==
Jacob Appel's The Man Who Wouldn't Stand Up was a satire of post-9/11 patriotism in the United States, called by Stephen Fry, a 2012 judge, "darkly comic", and fellow judge Philip Pullman called it "Engaging, funny, ingenious, even charming".

== 2013 ==
Nicola White's 2013 winner In the Rosary Garden (2013) is a murder mystery set in a convent school; being described by critics as "as good as it gets", A. L. Kennedy, a 2013 judge. called it "courageous and intelligent"

== 2014 ==
Amy Mason's The Other Ida won the 2014 prize. The novel focuses on two sisters in the wake of their mother's death; their struggle and the tension between the siblings play out as the two attempt to come to terms with loss.

== 2015 ==
Martin Cathcart Froden's Devil Take the Hindmost takes place in London during the 1920s and revolves around a cyclist caught up in the fevered bets and loan sharks of the velodrome racing scene.

== 2016 ==
The final prize was awarded to Jessica Thummel's The Cure for Lonely.
