= Nixey =

Nixey is a surname. Notable people with the surname include:

- Sarah Nixey (born 1973), British singer-songwriter
- Troy Nixey (born 1972), Canadian comic book artist and film director
- Catherine Nixey, author of the 2017 book The Darkening Age: The Christian Destruction of the Classical World

== See also ==
- Nixey Callahan (1874–1934), American baseball player
