= Giles St Aubyn Awards for Non-Fiction =

Non-fiction literature prize

The Royal Society of Literature Giles St Aubyn Awards for Non-Fiction are annual awards, granted by the Royal Society of Literature (RSL) to authors engaged in writing their first non-fiction book for a mainstream audience. The prize provides additional time or resources for writing or research, as well as raising the profile of the book when published.

Recipients must have a publishing contract and be citizens of either the UK or Ireland, or have been residents in one of these for at least the three years previous to the award.

The award was established in 2017, and secured in perpetuity through a bequest from author and RSL Fellow Giles St Aubyn. The awards replaced the earlier RSL Jerwood Award, which existed from 2004 to 2016 and was funded by the Jerwood Charitable Foundation.

Giles St Aubyn (1925-2015) wrote 14 non-fiction books and taught history for nearly 40 years at Eton College. A nephew of Vita Sackville-West, he counted John Betjeman, John le Carré and the Queen Mother among his friends.

== Recipients ==
List of recipients, titles and publishers
Year	1st prize £10,000	2nd prize £5000	3rd prize £2500 (from 2020)	Judges
2023	Oliver Basciano; Outcast: A History of Leprosy, Humanity and the Modern World (Faber & Faber)	Taj Ali; Come What May, We’re Here to Stay: A Story of South Asian Resistance (Manchester University Press)	Katherine Dunn; Right Here, Right Now: The Hidden History of How the Global Positioning System Shaped the Modern World (Mudlark, Harper Collins)	Tom Burgis; Fiona St Aubyn; Leila Aboulela
2022	Nuzha Nuseibeh; Namesake (Canongate, 2023)	Ellen Atlanta; Pixel Flesh: Modern Beauty Culture and The Women It Harms (Headline, Hachette, 2023)	Malachi McIntosh; A Revolutionary Consciousness: Black Britain, Black Power, and the Caribbean Artists Movement (Faber, 2025)	Homi K. Bhahba; Fiona St Aubyn; Violet Moller
2021	Tomiwa Owolade; This is Not America (Atlantic Books, 2022)	Tom Ireland; The Good Virus (Hodder & Stoughton, 2022)	David Veevers; A New History of the World at the Dawn of British Expansion (Penguin Random House/Ebury, 2022)	Gwen Adshead; Fiona Boyle; Clive Myrie
2020	Doreen Cunningham; Soundings: A Journey with Whales; Virago, 2022	Alice Sherwood; The Authenticity Playbook; Harper Collins, 2022	Danny Lavelle; Down and Out: A Journey Through Homelessness; Wildfire, 2022	Damian Le Bas; Ramita Navai; Fiona St Aubyn
2019	Harry Davies; Operation Information; The Bodley Head, 2021	Olive Heffernan; The High Seas: The Race to Save the Earth’s Last Wilderness; Profile Books, 2021	†Rebecca Fogg; Beautiful Trauma; Granta, 2022	Fiona St Aubyn (Chair); Rachel Hewitt; Kenan Malik
2018	Laurence Blair; Lost Countries of South America: Travels in a Continent's Past and Present; The Bodley Head, 2020	Lily Le Brun; Looking to Sea: Britain Through the Eyes of its Artists; Hodder and Stoughton, 2020	†Paul Craddock; Dragon in a Suitcase: A Cultural History of the Art of Transplant; Fig Tree, 2020	Iain Sinclair (Chair); Laura Bates; Aida Edemariam; Fiona St Aubyn
2017	David Farrier; Footprints: In Search of Future Fossils; 4th Estate, 2019	Lisa Woollett; Scavenging; John Murray, 2019	†Joanna Jolly; Red River Girl: The Life and Death of Tina Fontaine; Virago, 2019	Richard Holmes (Chair); Afua Hirsch; Fiona St Aubyn

† Judges' Special Commendation
