= Devil Take the Hindmost =

"Devil take the hindmost" is a proverbial expression, first in print in 1611 (see Wiktionary). It may also refer to:

== Songs ==
- "Devil Take the Hindmost", a song by Angelus Apatrida from the 2010 album Clockwork
- "Devil Take the Hindmost", a song from the 2010 musical Love Never Dies
- "Devil Take the Hindmost", a track by Allan Holdsworth from the 1985 album Metal Fatigue

== Literature ==
- Hawk & Fisher: Winner Takes All, also published as Devil Take the Hindmost, a 1991 book by Simon R. Green
- Devil Take the Hindmost: A History of Financial Speculation, a 1999 book by Edward Chancellor
- Devil Take the Hindmost, a book by Martin Cathcart Froden, winner of the 2015 Dundee International Book Prize

== Other uses ==
- Devil Take the Hindmost, or Miss and Out, a bicycle racing elimination race
- "Devil Take the Hindmost", a 2000 episode of Baldi, a BBC radio murder mystery
- "Devil Take the Hindmost", the fifth and last episode of Halo: Nightfall.

== See also ==
- List of proverbial phrases § D
- Every Man for Himself (disambiguation)
