= City of Lies (Navai book) =

2014 book by Ramita Navai

City of Lies: Love, Sex, Death and the Search for Truth in Tehran
- Author: Ramita Navai
- Subjects: Iran
- Genre: Nonfiction
- Publisher: Weidenfeld and Nicolson (UK), PublicAffairs (US)
- Publication date: May 8, 2014
- Pages: 320

City of Lies is a 2014 nonfiction book by British-Iranian journalist Ramita Navai. It deals with society in contemporary Iran and the impact of morality laws, repression, hypocrisy and censorship in Iran.

== Summary ==
The book examines the realities of life under the Islamic Republic of Iran, by presenting aspects from different walks of life in Tehran. It includes eight chapters, each based on a different character profile, including a transgender soldier, a radicalized Iranian-American assassin and a porn star. The narrative moves systematically down Valiasr Street, from the comfortable northern districts to the city's southern underbelly. It explores themes of repression, religious hypocrisy, and social divides in 21st-century Iran.

== Reception ==
The book received mostly positive reviews from critics for examining Tehran's underworld, as well as its vivid, novel-like descriptions of daily life in Tehran. Some reviewers criticized the book for blurring the line between fact and fiction, especially with regards to combining anecdotes to create pastiche characters. It won Debut Political Book of the Year at the Paddy Power awards, and a Jerwood Award from the Royal Society of Literature. Both the Evening Standard and The Spectator included it on their list of the year's best books.

Holly Dagres of The Cairo Review wrote that the book effectively creates empathy for its subjects, while noting that it "often strays into material that delights in having shock value." Sohrab Ahmari, writing for The Wall Street Journal, criticized Navai's lack of sources and embellishing language.

In a review for Financial Times, Azadeh Moaveni wrote that "Navai illustrates how Iranians are far more bound by what they have in common: a strong awareness of class, an irrepressible drive for upward mobility, daily clashes with the forces of modernity and tradition, and a profound disillusionment with the opportunities society has on offer."

Critics noted that the main theme of the book was deception, as government repression forces ordinary Iranians to present an outward face of piety that did not always match their life circumstances. James Buchan of The Guardian summarized this theme, writing "In few other places is the gulf so wide between what is said and what is done." The book also explores self expression and autonomy among disadvantaged groups in Iran, namely women.
