= Tomiwa Owolade =

British journalist and author (born 1996)

- Born: July 1996 (age 29–30); Nigeria
- Education: Queen Mary, University of London; University College London
- Occupations: Journalist and author
- Notable work: This is Not America
- Awards: Giles St Aubyn Award (2021)

Tomiwa Owolade (born July 1996) is a British journalist and author based in London, England. His debut book, This is Not America, was the major winner of the 2021 Giles St Aubyn Award from the Royal Society of Literature for a first work of non-fiction.

== Early life ==
Owolade was born in Nigeria in 1996 and moved to London in 2005. He studied English at Queen Mary, University of London, graduating with a first-class BA degree in 2018, and went on to earn a postgraduate degree in English from University College London in 2019.

== Career ==
=== Journalism ===
Owolade is a journalist and commentator on race, language, education, and free speech. He began his career at the UnHerd website. He was a columnist at The Times and contributed to The Observer, The Telegraph, New Statesman and London Evening Standard and BBC Radio 4 documentaries. He is an assistant comment editor at The Telegraph.

=== Diane Abbott controversy ===
In April 2023, Owolade's column in The Observer on race and its role in differences in educational outcome in the UK provoked a letter from MP Diane Abbott in which she stated that Jews, Irish people and Travellers do not experience racism as black people do. This caused controversy and discussion during which Owolade supported calls for Abbott's resignation. and which resulted in her suspension from the Labour Party. Abbott withdrew her remarks and apologised.

=== This is Not America ===
In 2021, Owolade was the major winner of the Giles St Aubyn Award from the Royal Society of Literature for his book This is Not America, which was published by Atlantic Books in 2023. In the book, Owolade argues that "too much of the conversation around race in Britain is viewed through the prism of American ideas that don't reflect the history, challenges and achievements of increasingly diverse black populations at home."

This is Not America was widely reviewed. In The Guardian, Colin Grant called it a "timely intervention into the politics of identity", and Tony Sewell wrote in The Telegraph that it is "a sensible study". Pratinav Anil in The Times, where it was book of the week in June 2023, found that This is Not America focused on class over race. In The Spectator, Margaret Casely-Hayford called Owolade's "positive attitude" "glib". Kehinde Andrews stated that it was "so spectacularly bad it should never have been published" and coined the term "Uncle Tomiwa", which provoked further controversy. In December 2023, The Times chose the book as one of the best of the year, as did Tortoise Media and Michela Wrong in The Spectator.

=== Other ===
Owolade was one of the judges at the UCL Orwell Prize for Political Writing in 2023.
