= Craig Stone (author) =

British author (born 1980)

- Born: Craig Raymond Stone; 24 August 1980 (age 46); London, England
- Occupation: Novelist
- Spouse: Carolyn
- Children: 2
- Writing career
- Period: 2008–present
- Genres: Horror; Fantasy; Biographical
- Notable works: Life Knocks; The Squirrel that Dreamt of Madness; Deep in the Bin of Bob
- Website: thoughtscratchings.com

Craig Raymond Stone (born 24 August 1980) is a British author. He left a job in the city to live homeless in a park, during which time he wrote his first book, The Squirrel that Dreamt of Madness, a semi-autobiographical account of his time in the park. He later wrote Life Knocks, Deep in the Bin of Bob and How to Hide from Humans, and is the author of the blog, Thought Scratchings, shortlisted for the 2014 UK Blog Awards.

His second novel Life Knocks was shortlisted for the Dundee International Book Prize.

== Personal life ==
At the age of 30 Stone quit his job and became homeless, living under a tree in Gladstone Park, North London. While here he wrote his first novel, The Squirrel that Dreamt of Madness. Stone lived with his sister to escape the park and the book went on to receive hundreds of five star reviews. His future wife read the book during this time, and reached out to him through Twitter. She messaged him as a fan, expressing how much she enjoyed his first novel, and today they have a son and a daughter.

Stone is an advocate for homeless people in the UK.

Stone is also an advocate for mental health awareness.

Stone has over 100,000 Twitter followers. Some of his tweets have been featured in the press.

His fourth novel is coming in 2023, titled The Last March of the Pirate Snails. It is notable because the novel is 78,000+ words and entirely rhymes.

Today, Stone is a contributing journalist for The Guardian Newspaper and AL Jazeera
