= Inside Science =

Science programme on BBC Radio 4 and the World Service

Inside Science is a weekly science programme broadcast on BBC Radio 4 and the BBC World Service. It was first broadcast on 4 July 2013, one week after the final episode of its predecessor Material World. As of December 2024 it is broadcast from 4:30–5:00 pm each Thursday, repeated at 8:30 pm the following Monday. It was previously presented by Adam Rutherford, Victoria Gill, and Marnie Chesterton, but as of 2026 is primarily presented by Tom Whipple. Any branch of science, physics, chemistry or biology, may be discussed on the programme. The programme normally features the presenter interviewing several people who are specialists in different areas of science. On occasions, topics connected with the history of science may feature in the programme, as on 16 November 2017, when the work of Sir Francis Galton was discussed. The programme normally deals with several areas of science, but may occasionally be dedicated to one field of science, as on 5 April 2018, when a whole programme was dedicated to the work of Stephen Hawking. Similarly, on 25 June 2020 a whole programme was dedicated to the Human Genome Project. On 18 February 2021, when the programme was presented by Victoria Gill, the first part of the programme dealt with the planned landing of the Perseverance Rover on Mars. In November 2025, the programme expanded to the BBC World Service, after replacing the former radio programme, Science in Action, which ended broadcasting in 2025.

== See also ==
- Science in Action, the former radio programme on the BBC World Service
- Material World, BBC Radio 4 science programme which was replaced by Inside Science
