= Jerwood Award =

Non-fiction literature prize

The Royal Society of Literature Jerwood Awards for Non-Fiction were financial awards made to assist new writers of non-fiction to carry out new research, and/or to devote more time to writing. The awards were administrated by the Royal Society of Literature on behalf of the Jerwood Charitable Foundation.

Recipients must have a publishing contract and be citizens of either the UK or Ireland, or have been residents in one of these for at least the last three years.

In 2017, the awards were replaced by the Giles St Aubyn Awards for Non-Fiction.

== Recipients ==
=== 2016 ===
- Violet Moller for The Geography of Knowledge, Pan Macmillan (£10k)
- Afua Hirsch for Brit(ish): Getting Under the Skin of Britain's Race Problem, Cape (£5k)
- Damian Le Bas (writer) for Stopping Places, Chatto (£5k)

=== 2015 ===
- Thomas Morris for The Matter of the Heart, Bodley Head (£10k)
- Catherine Nixey for The Darkening Age, MacMillan (£5k)
- Duncan White for Cold Warriors: Waging Literary War Across the Iron Curtain, Little, Brown (£5k)

=== 2014 ===
- Laurence Scott for The Four-Dimensional Human, Heinemann (£10k)
- Minoo Dinshaw for A Life of Sir Steven Runciman, Penguin (£5k)
- Aida Edemariam for The Wife's Tale, 4th Estate (£5k)

=== 2013 ===
- Tom Burgis for The Looting Machine, William Collins (£10k)
- Julian Mash for Portobello Road: Dispatches from the Street, Frances Lincoln (£5k)
- Corri Waitt for The Wisdom of Chickens, Quercus (£5k)

=== 2012 ===
- Ramita Navai for City of Lies: The Undercover Truth About Tehran, Weidenfeld & Nicolson (£10k)
- Edmund Gordon for Angela Carter: The Biography, Chatto (£5k)
- Gwen Adshead for A Short Book About Evil, Jessica Kingsley (£5k)

=== 2011 ===
- James Macdonald Lockhart for Raptor: A Journey Through Britain's Birds of Prey, Fourth Estate (£10k)
- Gerard Russell for Heirs to Forgotten Kingdoms, Simon & Schuster (£5k)
- Helen Smith for Edward Garnett: The Uncommon Reader, Jonathan Cape (£5k)
- Polly Morland for The Society of Timid Souls, or How to Be Brave, Profile (£2k)

=== 2010 ===
- Alexander Monro for The Paper Trail, Penguin (£10k)
- Roger Beam for Englandspiel, Haynes (£5k)
- Jonathan Beckman for Cardinal Sins: Marie Antoinette and the Affair of the Necklace, Fourth Estate (£5k)

=== 2009 ===
- Caspar Henderson for The Book of Barely Imagined Beings, Granta (£10k)
- Miles Hollingworth for St Augustine of Hippo: An Intellectual Biography, Continuum (£5k)
- Selina Mills for Life Unseen: The Story of Blindness, IB Tauris (£5k)

=== 2008 ===
- Rachel Hewitt for Map of a Nation, Granta (£10k)
- Matthew Hollis for Edward Thomas:The Final Years, Faber (£5k)
- Paul Farley and Michael Symmons Roberts for Edgelands – Journeys into England’s Last Wilderness, Cape (£2.5k each)

=== 2007 ===
- Andrew Stott for The Pantomime Life of Joseph Grimaldi, Canongate (£10k)
- Rachel Campbell-Johnston for Mysterious Wisdom: The Life and Work of Samuel Palmer, Bloomsbury (£5k)
- Daniel Swift for A Terrible Fury, Hamish Hamilton (£5k)

=== 2006 ===
- Carolyn Steel for Hungry City, Chatto (£10k)
- Sarah Irving for Natural Science and the Origins of British Empire, Pickering & Chatto (£5k)
- Thomas Wright for Oscar’s Books, Chatto (£5k)

=== 2005 ===
- Alice Albinia for Empires of the Indus, John Murray (£12,500)
- Christopher Turner for Adventures in the Orgasmatron, Fourth Estate (£10k)
- Druin Burch for Digging Up the Dead, Chatto (£5k)
- Matthew Green for The Wizard of the Nile, Portobello (£5k)

=== 2004 ===
- Jim Endersby for A Guinea Pig’s History of Biology, Heinemann (£10k)
- Roland Chambers for The Last Englishman – The Double Life of Arthur Ransome, Faber (£5k)
- John Stubbs for John Donne: The Reformed Soul, Viking (£5k)
