= Ellen Atlanta =

British non-fiction writer

- Born: Ellen Atlanta Ormerod; 6 November 1995 (age 30); Leicester, England
- Education: City, University of London; Lucy Cavendish College, Cambridge
- Years active: 2014–present
- Website: www.ellenatlanta.com

Ellen Atlanta Ormerod (born 6 November 1995) is an English contemporary cultural writer. Her debut book Pixel Flesh: How Toxic Beauty Culture Harms Women (2024) was shortlisted for a Nero Book Award and earned second prize at the Giles St Aubyn Awards for Non-Fiction. Her writing covers topics such as feminism, the beauty industry, and social media culture.

== Early life and education ==
Ellen Atlanta Ormerod grew up in a small Leicestershire village. Her mother worked in fashion design. Atlanta dealt with chronic illness as a child and was "in and out of hospital from the age of eight to 22".

Atlanta attended Groby Community College (now Brookvale Groby), completing her A Levels in 2014. She earned the Lord Mayor Scholarship to study at City, University of London, graduating in 2017 with a Bachelor of Arts (BA) in Journalism. She later completed a Master of Studies (MSt) in Creative Writing at Lucy Cavendish College, Cambridge in 2023.

== Career ==
While still in school, Atlanta started an online magazine/blog with her friends and was contacted by Sharmadean Reid, who liked her nail designs on Instagram and invited her to test them at Reid's WAH Nails stand in Topshop. Later in university for an interview project, Atlanta reconnected with Reid, who offered her a job starting 2016. Atlanta paused her studies to help Reid open her studio WAH Nails in Soho. Based on her familiarity with youth culture, Atlanta went into brand consulting and marketing, becoming a founding editor of Dazed Beauty in 2018. She also joined BeautyCon and helped relaunch Reid's Beautystack, writing a short film directed by Leonn Ward for the campaign. After being requested to market cosmetic procedures and face-tuning technology for a company, Atlanta quit, saying "I couldn't reconcile promoting these treatments to young women with my feminism."

Via a six-way auction in 2022, Headline Publishing Group acquired the rights to publish Atlanta's debut book Pixel Flesh: How Toxic Beauty Culture Harms Women in 2024. The book examines and contextualises the ways social media has amplified toxic beauty standards, with Atlanta approaching the subject from the perspective of having worked in the beauty industry. Atlanta had noticed a rise in young girls who felt pressured to conform and look like social media influencers, saying "It almost felt like overnight the industry shifted from a place that for me felt more expressive and fun into an incredibly prescriptive idea of beauty."

Chloé Cooper Jones, philosophy professor at the Columbia School of the Arts, described Pixel Flesh as "an essential mirror reflecting the profound impact of beauty culture on our lives". Pixel Flesh earned second prize in the Royal Society of Literature's 2022 Giles St Aubyn Awards for Non-Fiction and was shortlisted for a 2024 Nero Book Award in the Non-fiction category. Atlanta appeared on the 2024 Dazed 100 list.

In addition, Atlanta writes a column for Dazed. She has also contributed articles to publications including the Evening Standard and Elle UK.

== Bibliography ==
- Pixel Flesh: How Toxic Beauty Culture Harms Women (2024)

== Accolades ==
Year	Award	Category	Title	Result	Ref.
2022	Giles St Aubyn Awards for Non-Fiction		Pixel Flesh	2nd	
2024	Nero Book Awards	Non-fiction	Pixel Flesh	Shortlisted	
