= Tindal Street Press =

British book publisher

- Founded: 1998; 27 years ago
- Country of origin: United Kingdom
- Key people: Alan Mahar

Tindal Street Press was a Birmingham-based independent publisher of contemporary literary fiction, with a particular focus on writers born, or living, in Birmingham and the West Midlands. According to its website, it was "a publicly funded organisation committed to providing a national and international platform for talented new writers from the English regions".

It emerged in 1998 from the Tindal Street Fiction Group, a Birmingham writers' group whose members have included Alan Mahar (its founder), Alan Beard, Jackie Gay, Joel Lane, Gul Davis, Mick Scully, Annie Murray, that was set up in 1983. Tindal Street is a no-through-street in Balsall Heath, where the group had met in the Old Moseley Arms pub.

Tindal Street Press titles have been recognised by many prizes and listings, including three Booker Prize nominations (Clare Morrall, Gaynor Arnold, Catherine O'Flynn) and two Costa First Novel of the Year awards. They have published first novels by several Midlands-based writers, including Anthony Cartwright, Paul McDonald, Clare Morrall, and Catherine O'Flynn.

Tindal Street Press was run as a not-for-profit arts organization, supported by the Arts Council England and Birmingham City Council, and based in the Custard Factory, Birmingham. In 2012 Tindal Street Press became an imprint of London-based Profile Books, who also have Serpent's Tail as part of their portfolio.
