= Caspar Henderson =

British writer and journalist

Caspar Henderson is a British writer and journalist living in Oxford, England. He has written on the subjects of energy, science, environment and human rights.

== Biography ==
Henderson was educated at Westminster School and Corpus Christi College, Cambridge.

After working as a film script reader in Los Angeles, an aid worker in Uganda, and a research assistant and junior journalist working on human rights and the arming of Iraq by foreign powers and other matters, he became co-ordinator of the Green College Centre at Oxford University from 1992 to 1994, which focused on climate change and other environmental issues. In 1995 and 1996 he worked on Costing the Earth, the flagship environment program on BBC Radio 4.

From 1996 to 2002 he wrote on topics such as energy, science, environment and human rights for The Financial Times, The Independent, New Scientist, The Ecologist, Environmental Finance, Green Futures and other newspapers, magazines, and broadcast media. In 1999 he won the IUCN-Reuters award for best environmental writing in western and central Europe. From 1996 to 2002 he was also a consultant, analyst and writer for government, commercial and non-profit organisations.

From 2002 to 2005 he was a senior editor at OpenDemocracy, a project for open global politics, where he commissioned, edited and contributed to analysis and debate on globalisation, security, the environment, and the politics of climate change. He has been a contributing editor and member of the editorial advisory board at chinadialogue, and a member of the advisory group for Artists' Project Earth.

His Book of Barely Imagined Beings: A 21st Century Bestiary received the Roger Deakin Award from the Society of Authors in 2009 and the Royal Society of Literature Jerwood Award in 2010 while it was a work in progress, and was published by Granta Books in October 2012 and by University of Chicago Press in April 2013 (ISBN 978-0-226-04470-5). In 2013 it was short-listed for the Royal Society Winton Prize for Science Books, for the Society of Biology book awards (general category), and for Best British Book category of the British Book Design & Production Awards. Editions have been published in Chinese, Estonian, French, German, Italian, Japanese, Korean, Polish, Russian, Spanish and Turkish.

His book A New Map of Wonders was published in November 2017 by Granta and University of Chicago Press, with editions from other publishers in Chinese, French, German, Polish and Spanish.

His A Book of Noises, was published in 2023 by Granta and University of Chicago Press. The book was a finalist for the 2024 Los Angeles Times Book Prize in the science and technology category. Foreign language editions have been published in Arabic, Chinese, French, Italian, Korean, Spanish and Turkish.

He is working on a book called The Kinetikon.
