= Gwen Adshead =

Forensic psychotherapist, academic

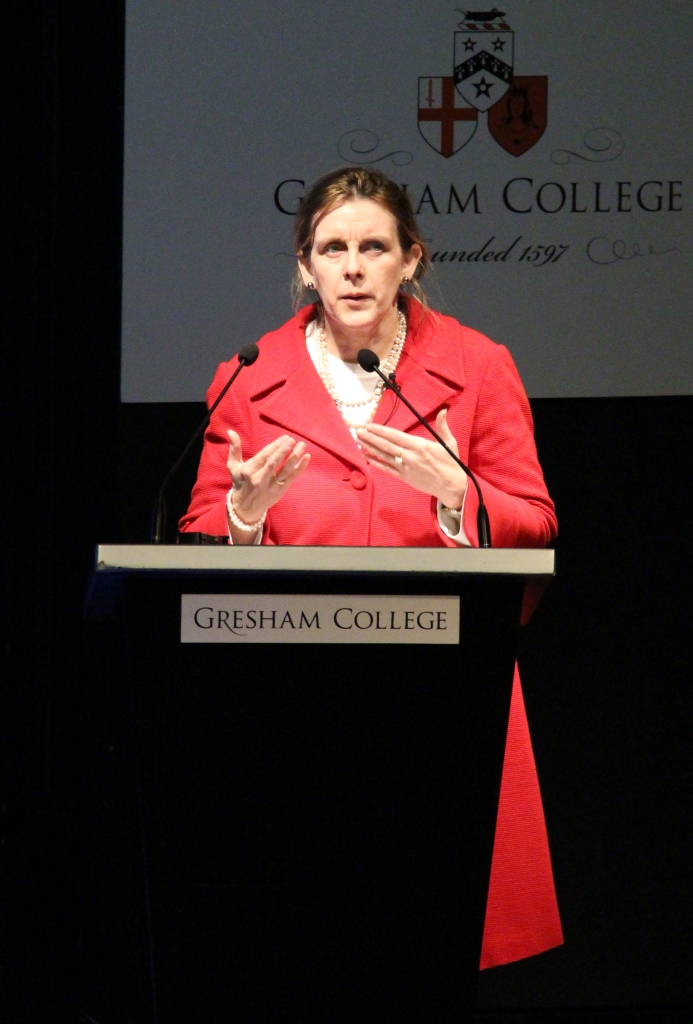
- Gwen Adshead delivering a Gresham College lecture in February 2015
- Born: 14 September 1960 (age 65); Christchurch, New Zealand
- Education: St. George's Hospital Medical School (MD, Honorary PhD); King's College London (MA); Oxford University (MA)
- Occupations: Psychiatrist, Psychotherapist

Gwen Adshead (born 1960) is a forensic psychiatrist and psychotherapist who has worked for the NHS for nearly three decades. She currently works as a consultant at Broadmoor Hospital. She has published hundreds of research papers and is a Sunday Times bestselling author.

== Early life ==
Gwen Adshead was born on 14 September 1960 in Christchurch, New Zealand. At the age of 11, she flew alone to England to attend Cheltenham Ladies' College as a boarder.

== Education ==
Adshead qualified in Medicine in 1983. She then trained in general and forensic psychiatry at St. George's Hospital. She became an elected member of the Royal College of Psychiatrists in 1987, and in 2005, she was made a fellow.

Adshead holds a Master's degree from King's College London in Medical Law and Ethics, where she took an interest in responsibility, moral reasoning, and psychiatric illness. She also holds a Master's of Science degree in Mindfulness-Based Cognitive Therapy from Oxford University. She is also a qualified member of the Institute of Group Analysis and has trained in basic mentalization-based therapy.

Adshead has been awarded two honorary doctorates by St. George's Hospital Medical School in 2016 and 2024.

Adshead trained as a psychotherapist after her psychiatric training because she wanted to spend more time talking with her patients. The field of forensic psychotherapy helped in bringing together Dr. Adshead's interest in psychology and law together.

== Career ==
=== Clinical work ===
From 1996, Adshead was a consultant at Broadmoor Hospital, working as a consultant forensic psychiatrist and later, as a consultant psychotherapist with violent offenders.

In 2013, Adshead served as the Jochelson Visiting Professor at The Law and Psychiatry Division of Yale School of Medicine. She also served as a Visiting Professor of Psychiatry at Gresham College from 2014 to 2017. During this time, Dr. Adshead was also a consultant forensic psychiatrist at Ravenswood House, a medium security unit for treating individuals with violent behaviours and severe mental health matters.

Adshead has also acted as an expert witness in different cases and, in March of 2021, she was doing most of her work with family courts.

Adshead has spent nearly three decades working for the NHS. As of 2024, she works part time in the NHS, with a focus on forensic psychotherapy, as a consultant in a high secure hospital and in a women's prison. She has spent her career trying to understand the psychological mechanisms that result in violence and life threatening behaviours toward other individuals.

=== Research ===
Over the course of her career, Dr. Adshead has authored hundreds (325) of academic articles and book chapters. Her articles have been published in Australian and New Zealand Journal of Psychiatry, Frontiers in Psychiatry, Journal of Forensic Psychiatry & Psychology, and Medicine Science and the Law. Her research includes topics in psychological mechanisms of violence, professional ethics, and attachment theory in forensic settings.

Adshead has co-edited several academic books, including Ethical Issues in Forensic and Mental Health Research.

=== Books ===
Adshead has published several books.

Adshead's book A Short Book About Evil was published 28 April 2015. The writing of the book was supported by a Jerwood Award, received in 2012.

In February of 2026, Dr. Adshead wrote an article for The Telegraph regarding her book Unspeakable: Stories of survival & transformation after trauma.

The Guardian reviewed The Devil You Know, describing it as a compassionate and insightful exploration of violent offenders' stories. The review notes that Dr. Adshead draws on her extensive clinical experience to present deeply human and thought-provoking accounts of patients' lives.

The Times described Dr. Adshead's upcoming book, Unspeakable: Stories of survival & transformation after trauma, as a deeply human exploration of trauma, highlighting her use of clinical experience to present survivors' stories.

=== Media Appearances ===
Adshead has appeared on several radio programmes including:

- October 1999, In Our Time, BBC Radio 4 – to discuss atrocities in the 20th century.
- 1 July 2010, Desert Island Discs, BBC Radio 4.
- August 2022, BBC HARDtalk – discussing her career, compassion and the concept of evil.
- November 2024, she delivered the BBC's annual Reith Lecture series opening a 4-part discourse on BBC Radio 4 commencing 26 November 2024.

She has appeared on podcasts including:

- August 2022, Zeinab Badawi's podcast – discussing why she thinks compassion should be used with people that others consider to be evil.

She has also been interviewed by several publications including:

- 2014, British Medical Journal.
- 2025, Church Times, Adshead – discussing her perspective that "evil" it's not a diagnosis and emphasizing the importance of understanding violent behaviour through clinical and social context rather than simplistic labels.

== Awards ==
Adshead has received several awards for her work, including:

- 2012, Jerwood Award to support the writing of A Short Book About Evil, which was published 28 April 2015.
- In 2013, Dr. Adshead was honored with the Royal College of Psychiatry's President's Medal for her work in ethics in mental health. The Devil You Know, which she co-wrote with Eileen Horne, was shortlisted for Best Nonfiction at the 2023 Ngaio Marsh Awards. Additionally, in 2024, Dr. Adshead was named one of five honorary fellows of the Royal College of Psychiatrists.

== Personal life ==
Adshead is the mother of two boys.

Adshead is a Christian and enjoys singing as part of a choir.

== Bibliography ==
=== Books ===
- Adshead, G., Eastman, N., Fox S., Latham, Whyte, S., & Williams, H. (2012) Forensic Psychiatry. American Psychiatric Association Publishing. ISBN 978-0-19-882558-6
- Adshead, G (2015). A Short Book About Evil. Jessica Kingsley Publishers. ISBN 978-1-84905-054-8
- Horne, E. & Adshead, G. (2021). The devil you know: Encounters in forensic psychiatry. Scribner. ISBN 978-1-9821-3480-8
- Adshead, G (2025) Four Questions About Violence: Insights from a Forensic Psychiatrist. Faber & Faber. ISBN 978-0-571-39509-5
- Horne, E. & Adshead, G. (2026). Unspeakable: Stories of survival & transformation after trauma. Faber & Faber. ISBN 978-0-571-38525-6

=== Articles ===
- "Brain blood flow in anxiety disorders - OCD, panic disorder with agoraphobia, and post-traumatic stress disorder on 99mTcHMPAO single photon emission tomography (SPET)"
- "Psychiatric staff as attachment figures - Understanding management problems in psychiatric services in the light of attachment theory"
- "Life after homicide: accounts of recovery and redemption of offender patients in a high security hospital - a qualitative study"
