= Science in Action (radio programme) =

Science radio programme

- Genre: Current science
- Running time: 28 minutes
- Country of origin: UK
- Language: English
- Home station: BBC World Service
- Hosted by: Roland Pease
- Recording studio: Broadcasting House
- Original release: 7 July 1979 – 30 October 2025
- Website: Science in Action
- Podcast: Podcasts

Science in Action was a long-running weekly radio programme produced by the BBC World Service and hosted by British journalists Roland Pease, Marnie Chesterton, and scientist and broadcaster Professor Adam Hart. It was broadcast on Thursdays at 18.32 GMT and repeated twice the following day, at 01.32 and 08.32.

A programme with the title Science in Action is believed to have begun life in 1964, when it replaced an earlier series, dating from the 1950s, called Science and Industry. From September 1965 a short-lived series called Science in Action ran on the Home Service; it was broadcast at 19.30 on Thursdays, later 21.30. In December 1965 it was moved to 14.30 on Fridays. The present weekly World Service series, also called Science in Action, began on Saturday 7 July 1979.

The last broadcast was on 30 October 2025, as part of a cut of £6 million from the World Service and loss of 130 jobs. The programme was replaced with BBC Radio 4's programme, Inside Science, which took over the former slots of Science in Action.

== See also ==
- Inside Science, radio programme on BBC Radio Four
