= Amy Mason =

British novelist

Amy Mason (born 17 May 1982) is a British comedian, novelist and theatre maker from Bristol, England. Her debut novel The Other Ida won the 2014 Dundee International Book Prize.

== Early life and education ==
Mason grew up in Poole, Dorset, where she attended Parkstone Grammar School, leaving at the age of 16. She subsequently completed an MPhil in writing at the University of South Wales. Mason is the granddaughter of actor, Lionel Jeffries.

== Works ==
She has written and performed two shows, both produced by Bristol Old Vic; Mass and The Islanders. The Islanders was written with Mason's ex-partner, Art Brut singer Eddie Argos and award-winning folk singer-songwriter, Jim Moray. It won the 2013 Ideas Tap Edinburgh Fringe Fund, before being published as a graphic novel by Nasty Little Press. Mason's non-fiction has also appeared in The Guardian. In 2009 Mason's short story 'To the Bridge' was published in the Tindal Street Press anthology Roads Ahead.

=== Printed works ===
To the Bridge (short story) - Roads Ahead - an anthology (Tindal Street Press, 2009, ISBN 978-1-906994-00-6)

The Islanders (graphic novel) - (Nasty Little Press, 2012, ISBN 978-0-9573000-6-4)

The Other Ida (novel) - (Cargo, 2014, ISBN 1908885246)

=== Stage plays ===
The Islanders (2012)

Mass (2014)
