= Pete Newbon =

British academic (1983–2022)

- Born: 1983
- Died: 15 January 2022 (aged 38–39); A64, North Yorkshire
- Occupation: Lecturer
- Spouse: Rachel Hewitt
- Children: 3

Academic background
- Education: King's College, Cambridge
- Thesis: Representations of childhood in the Wordsworth circle (2011)

Academic work
- Discipline: Literature
- Institutions: Northumbria University
- Notable works: The Boy-Man, Masculinity and Immaturity in the Long Nineteenth Century

Peter Jonathan Hewitt Newbon (1983 – 15 January 2022) was a British academic. At the time of his suicide, he was a lecturer in Romantic and Victorian literature at Northumbria University and a director of Labour Against Antisemitism, a campaign group against Jeremy Corbyn's leadership of the UK Labour Party.

== Biography ==
Newbon studied at King's College, Cambridge, from which he graduated with Bachelor of Arts (BA; 2006), Master of Philosophy (MPhil; 2007), and Doctor of Philosophy (PhD; 2011) degrees. His doctoral thesis was titled "Representations of childhood in the Wordsworth circle".

He joined Northumbria University in 2012. His research interests were the concept of childhood in the Romantic period, and the concept of the boy-man in the long nineteenth century. He was married to academic Rachel Hewitt; they had three daughters.

In May 2021, Newbon posted a manipulated image on Twitter of Jeremy Corbyn reading Michael Rosen's book We're Going on a Bear Hunt to a group of children. The cover of the book had been superimposed with the antisemitic forgery The Protocols of the Elders of Zion. In a play on Rosen's words, "We can't go over it. We can't go under it. Oh no! We've got to go through it!", Newbon wrote, "A nasty, horrible Zionist! We can't go over him, we can't go under him, we'll have to make an effigy..." Rosen called the tweet "loathsome and anti-Semitic". Newbon subsequently received abusive online messages and, according to his lawyer, was "remorselessly bullied".

Northumbria University received 4,000 complaints against Newbon and began disciplinary proceedings. The disciplinary action culminated in Newbon being issued with a final written warning for bringing his employer into disrepute.

In July 2021, a claim was made against Newbon in the High Court for defamation, harassment and misuse of private information regarding an unrelated incident. A financial settlement in relation to costs was reached against his estate as a result of this claim. In April 2024, the defamation claim succeeded against the two surviving defendants and the claimant was awarded £30,000 in damages to reflect the conduct of all three defendants. The judge found that Newbon's conduct was "simply abusive" and "amounted to a form of public bullying".

Newbon died on 15 January 2022 from a fall from a road bridge, and being then struck by four cars on the road below. His inquest was conducted by the Assistant Coroner for North Yorkshire and York, Jonathan Leach, in Northallerton on 4 April 2023. The Coroner's finding was suicide. The Yorkshire Post reported that Newbon had had a disagreement with his wife earlier. The dispute with Rosen was not referred to at the Coroner's hearing.

After his death, the Board of Deputies of British Jews opened a condolence book in his honour. The Jewish Chronicle described him as "the anti-racism warrior with a radiant soul".

== Publications ==
- Newbon, Peter (2018). The Boy-Man, Masculinity and Immaturity in the Long Nineteenth Century (Palgrave Studies in the History of Childhood). ISBN 9781137408136
