= Ryan Jude Novelline =

American fashion designer

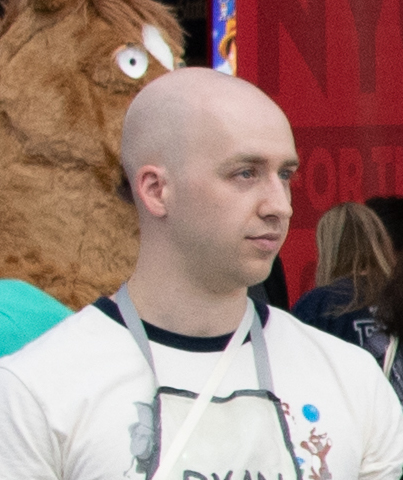
- Education: Rhode Island School of Design
- Known for: Contemporary art; Fashion Design
- Mother: Lisa Anne Novelline
- Website: www.ryanjudenovelline.com

Ryan Jude Novelline (/ˈnɒvɪliːn/ NOV-i-leen) is an Italian–American contemporary artist and clothing designer, and is known on social media as the Royal Dressmaker.

== Early life and education ==
Novelline is the second of four male children born to Dave, an information technology professional, and Lisa Anne Novelline, an author and former dancer who performed with the Boston Ballet. He credits The Secret Garden, Scott Gustafson’s illustrations for Peter Pan, and playing with Barbie dolls as childhood, creative influences. He attended Lexington High School where he received a gold key prize from the Alliance for Young Artists & Writers for a self-portrait drawing and awards for high academic achievement. He completed his BFA in Illustration at the Rhode Island School of Design and interned for Diane von Fürstenberg and Walt Disney Imagineering.

== Selected works ==
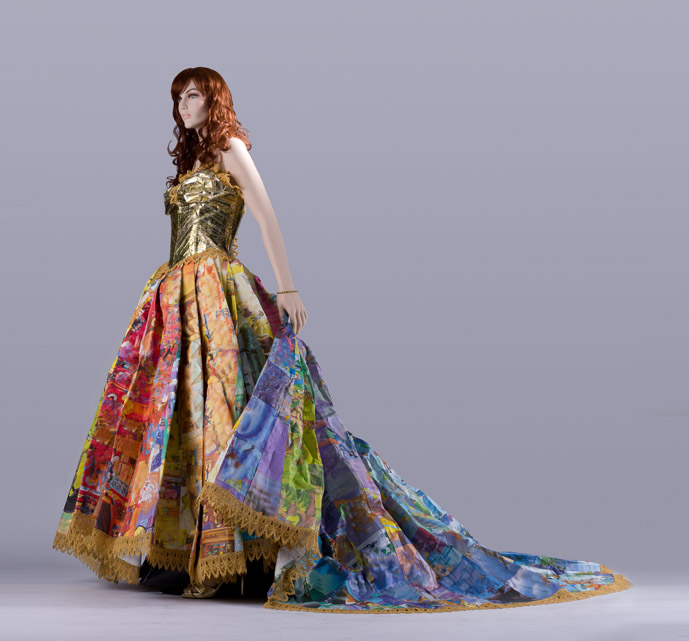
The Golden Book Gown

=== 2008–2012: RISD ===
In 2008 Novelline was commissioned, among other RISD students and faculty, by GAP creative director Patrick Robinson to create one-of-a-kind cardigans that would be sold out of GAP's flagship store on Fifth Avenue in New York. In 2011 Novelline created designs that were shown at Harvard University's fashion show, Eleganza. One of his dresses, an aquamarine and topaz Swarovski crystal-embellished gown, was made from repurposed hotel curtains and modeled by Sonia Dara.

==== The Golden Book Gown ====
During an elective college course in RISD's fashion department in 2010, Novelline created a garment from recycled materials. He acquired hundreds of recycled and discarded Little Golden Books from the Salvation Army and eBay to construct a dress comprised entirely of the illustrations from the books sewn together with metallic gold thread, and a bodice was made from the books' foil spines. Tommy Hilfiger called the piece "amazing". The work of contemporary art, titled The Golden Book Gown, received widespread attention for its design and innovative use of material. According to Italian Glamour, the piece "lascia tutti a bocca aperta" or "left everyone in awe." Publishers Weekly said that the dress "proves that green fashion can provide as rich a fantasia as can be imagined." The gown was voted the "most creative" fashion design of 2011 by Ecouterre.

=== 2013–2019 ===
In 2014, Novelline made a dress from the pages of recycled graphic novels for Maisie Williams that she wore as a guest judge for Bookbarn International's Out of Print Fashion Show. She wore the dress a second time at the Entertainment Weekly party at San Diego Comic-Con. The dress, called ZAM!, included pages from X-Men, Sandman, Sailor Moon, and Game of Thrones. According to The Huffington Post, the paper dress was "the coolest thing at Comic-Con" and later named among Williams’ "Best Looks" by Vogue.

Novelline collaborated on the children's book Piccadilly and the Fairy Polka contributing as the art director and illustrator of the book casing and dust jacket. In 2015, he created a series of illustrations of Tyler Oakley as Disney Princesses that were featured on Oakley's Tumblr. Influenced by a long-standing interest in fashion dolls, he has made paper dolls and art dolls wearing his own designs. In recognition of the Supreme Court's decision to recognize marriage equality in all 50 states, he created a commemorative art doll from an upcycled Barbie. The doll wore a rainbow gown and carried an American pride flag in one hand and a marriage license dated June 26, 2015, in the other.

Based on the fairy-tale Undine, Novelline showed a gown called Beyond Blue as cosplay during New York Comic-Con in 2017. The hemp-silk gown weighed over 50 pounds, had a 13-foot cathedral train, and featured over 20,000 hand-placed, Swarovski crystals. The fabric print featured a round composition of mermaids taken from one of the artist's original paintings. The blue gown was listed among the years "Best Cosplay" and compared to Elsa’s design from Frozen. In 2019, he returned to New York Comic-Con with a gown based on the story of Sleeping Beauty called The Good Fairy. According to him, the look "celebrate[d] not just the final character, but the process of creating one.“ The design was also listed among the year's “Best Cosplay".

=== 2020-present ===
Dutch influencer Rose Nora Anna danced to Billy Joel's Uptown Girl in a TikTok wearing a replica dress by Novelline of Princess Diana's blue Catherine Walker gown originally worn to the 1987 Cannes Film Festival. TikTok's Queen Astraea also ran through New York City in one of his dresses.

== Exhibitions ==
Novelline's Golden Book Gown was displayed at the Scottish Rite Masonic Museum & Library and was the centerpiece of an exhibit at the Drift Contemporary Art Gallery in 2013. At this show, he asked visitors to consider whether or not "the stories of our past become part of a sustainable future." Novelline was a guest speaker at Asian Geographic’s 2018 Asia Dive Expos (ADEX) in Singapore in April and again in Beijing in October. He presented Beyond Blue as part of a Mermaid Festival.

== See also ==
- Novelline, Lisa Anne (2014). Piccadilly and the Fairy Polka (illustrated ed.). Lexington, MA. ISBN 978-0983531111.
- Dodds, Felix (2021). Tomorrow's People and New Technology: Changing How We Live Our Lives. Taylor & Francis. p. 162. ISBN 9781000467673.
