= Edemariam Tsega =

Ethiopian physician and educator (1938–2018)

Edemariam Tsega FRCPC FAAS FTWAS
- እደማርያም ፀጋ
- Born: Edemariam Tsega Teshale; 7 July 1938; Gondar, Occupied Ethiopia, Italian East Africa
- Died: 1 January 2018 (aged 79); Hamilton, Ontario, Canada
- Occupations: Physician and educator
- Children: 4, including Aida Edemariam
- Awards: Order of the Blue Nile; Rockefeller Foundation's Research Fellowship; Distinguished Scientist Award, AAU; Bikila Award

Academic background
- Education: Addis Ababa University (BSc); McGill University (MDCM); London School of Hygiene and Tropical Medicine (DCMT); Lund University (PhD)

Edemariam Tsega (Amharic: እደማርያም ፀጋ; 7 July 1938 – 1 January 2018) was an Ethiopian physician and educator credited with introducing the post-graduate program in internal medicine in Ethiopia. Born in Gondar, he was the son of a respected Ethiopian Orthodox Church priest.

Tsega joined the Faculty of Medicine at Addis Ababa University (AAU) in 1971, serving as a medical director and internist at Leul Mekonnen and Haile Selassie I hospitals. By 1981, he became the first Ethiopian to be appointed as a full professor of medicine at AAU. He was instrumental in establishing Ethiopia's first postgraduate program in internal medicine during his tenure. Tsega's research primarily focused on liver diseases, especially viral hepatitis, in Ethiopia, and his dedication to medical education and research earned him numerous accolades, including the Order of the Blue Nile and the Distinguished Scientist Award from AAU.

After more than two decades of service in Ethiopia, Tsega moved to Canada in 1994. He practised and taught general internal medicine at Memorial University of Newfoundland and later at McMaster University in Hamilton, Ontario, where he retired as professor emeritus in 2014.

== Early life and education ==
Edemariam Tsega Teshale was born on 7 July 1938, in Gondar, Ethiopia to Aleqa Tsega Teshale, an Ethiopian Orthodox Church scholar and chief priest (Liqe Kahinat in Amharic) of Begemdir and Simien regions, and Yètèmegnu Mekonnen (1916–2013). He received a Bachelor of Science degree in 1961 from Addis Ababa University and a Doctor of Medicine (MDCM) in 1965 from McGill University. He then travelled to the UK to study, graduating from the London School of Hygiene & Tropical Medicine in 1969. Before 1971, he underwent a rotating internship in internal medicine and gastroenterology rotation training at the Montreal General Hospital.

== Career ==
=== Return to Ethiopia ===
In 1971, Tsega returned to Ethiopia and worked at the Faculty of Medicine at Addis Ababa University (AAU) as a medical director and Internist at Leul Mekonnen and Haile Selassie I hospitals. Later, in 1974–91, he became head of AAU's Department of Internal Medicine. He joined the Faculty of Medicine at AAU in 1972, before becoming the first Ethiopian to be appointed as a full professor of medicine at AAU in 1981.

During his tenure, Tsega was appointed as Chairman of the Faculty of Medicine Graduate Commission and a member of many committees of AAU and the Ministry of Health. He was the president of the Confederation of African Medical Associations and Societies between 1989 and 1990, and also served as the President of the Ethiopian Medical Association from 1990 to 1993. In 1991, he completed his Doctor of Philosophy in virology from Lund University, and was awarded a Rockefeller Foundation's research fellowship as a visiting professor at McGill University. He also became a diplomate of the American Board of Internal Medicine. Between 1992 and 1994, he was the dean of the Faculty of Medicine at AAU.

Tsega also had several appointments and memberships to the Ministry of Health of Ethiopia, the Science and Technology Commission of Ethiopia, Ethiopia's Commission for Higher Education, and academic and professional associations.

For 23 years, Tsega worked as an internist and gastroenterologist, conducting clinical research with grants from the Swedish International Development Cooperation Agency and Addis Ababa University, with a focus on viral hepatitis and acute and chronic liver disease. He also taught clinical medicine and endoscopic and laparoscopic skills to residents and teachers.

Tsega is credited with introducing the postgraduate program in internal medicine in Ethiopia. He also made significant contributions to the university, including teaching and mentoring medical students and conducting research in hepatology, gastroenterology, and tropical medicine. He also established the Tsega Endowment Fund to support the training of Ethiopian physicians in internal medicine at AAU and Ethiopian hospitals.

=== Move to Canada ===
After moving to Canada in 1994, Tsega served as a clinical professor of medicine in the Faculty of Medicine, Memorial University of Newfoundland, and was later appointed professor emeritus of Medicine at the Faculty of Medicine, McMaster University. He worked as a general internist from 1994 until 2001 in Grand Falls-Windsor, Newfoundland, and from 2001 until retirement in 2014 with Hamilton Health Sciences/McMaster University. He visited Ethiopia several times to teach at the Gondar Faculty of Medicine between 1999 and 2008.

Tsega was the author of The Life History & Qineis of Liqe Kahnat Aleqa Tsega Teshale (Tsega's father) in 2018, and A Guide to Writing Medical Case Reports (Green Book).

== Personal life and death ==
Tsega married in 1972 to Frances Lester, a distinguished doctor herself. Together, they had four children: Aida, Naomi, Yohannes and Yodit. His daughter Aida Edemariam, editor and writer at The Guardian, published The Wife's Tale: A Personal History in 2018, which is the story of Tsega's mother, Yètèmegnu.

Tsega died on 1 January 2018 in Hamilton, Canada. The Ethiopian Observer described him as "a light in the darkness" who will always be remembered.

== Awards and honours ==
Tsega received several honours and awards throughout his life, including the Distinguished Scientist Award from AAU, the Order of the Blue Nile for scientific achievement from the government of Ethiopia, the President's Award for distinguished services from the Medical Staff Association, the P2P Annual Award in 2004, and the Bikila Awards for Ethiopian Achievers in 2017.

Tsega was elected a fellow of the Royal College of Physicians and Surgeons of Canada in 1971, a fellow of The World Academy of Sciences in 1987, and a fellow of the African Academy of Sciences in 1988.
