= Lisa Anne Novelline =

American writer

- Born: December 12, 1968; Barberton, Ohio, U.S.
- Died: November 9, 2025 (aged 56)
- Education: Harvard University (MEd)
- Occupations: Writer, dancer
- Children: Ryan Jude Novelline
- Writing career
- Genre: children's books
- Website: www.lisaannenovelline.com

Lisa Anne Novelline /nɔːvɪliːn/ (novel-een; December 12, 1968 – November 9, 2025) was an Italian-American author from Lexington, Massachusetts.

== Bio ==
Novelline was born in Barberton, Ohio, and grew up in Chelmsford, Massachusetts. She was a ballet dancer who performed with the Boston Ballet. She played the role of Clara in its production of The Nutcracker in 1979 and 1980 and attended Phillips Academy. She lived in Lexington, Massachusetts and was the mother of four male children including Ryan Jude Novelline. She graduated with her Master of Education from Harvard University and was a math teacher and coach of Destination Imagination.

Novelline died on November 9, 2025, at the age of 56.

== Career ==
Novelline was the author of the children's book series Piccadilly's Magical World including Piccadilly and the Fairy Polka (2014), Piccadilly and the Waltzing Wind (2016), and Piccadilly and the Jolly Raindrops (2018). Kirkus Reviews described the first book in the series as a "warm, vibrant read", and the series' third book received the International Rubery Book Award for "Best Children's Book". Based on these books, she made multiple mobile games including Piccadilly’s Magical Storyteller and a jigsaw puzzle app titled Picadilly’s Puzzle Museum. In 2018, she also introduced a plush toy in the shape of a "happy" raindrop named Jolly Raindrop.

She attended various trade fairs including New York Comic Con (2015-2018), BookExpo America (2017), and Pax East (2019). She also authored the blog Holiday and Hearth that focuses on "family festivals" and gluten-free cooking. As of 2014, she was writing "a novel for young adults."

== Selected works ==
- Novelline, Lisa Anne (2018). Piccadilly and the Jolly Raindrops (Illustrated ed.). Lexington, MA. ISBN 9780983531166.
- Novelline, Lisa Anne (2016). Piccadilly and the Waltzing Wind (illustrated ed.). Lexington, MA. ISBN 978-0983531142.
- Novelline, Lisa Anne (2014). Piccadilly and the Fairy Polka (illustrated ed.). Lexington, MA. ISBN 978-0983531111.
- Novelline, Lisa Anne (2011). The Dance of Spring (illustrated ed.). Lexington, MA. ISBN 978-0983531104.
