= Lisa Woollett =

British writer

Lisa Woollett is a British writer whose work is about the sea, beachcombing and mudlarking. In 2016, she won the Non Fiction category of the International Rubery Book Award for Sea Journal. In 2017, she received 2nd prize in the Giles St Aubyn Awards for Non-Fiction for what would become Rag and Bone.

== Life ==
Woollett was born in London and grew up on the Isle of Sheppey, Kent. She now lives in Cornwall.

== Publications ==
- Sea and Shore Cornwall: Common and Curious Findings. Zart, 2013. ISBN 978-0957490208.
- Sea Journal. Zart, 2016. ISBN 978-0957490215.
- Treasure From the Sea. Mabecron, 2018. Illustrated by Sarah McCartney. ISBN 978-0995502840.
- Lost to the Sea: a Journey Round the Edges of Britain and Ireland. London: John Murray, 2024. ISBN 9781529373660.
- Rag and Bone: A History of What We've Thrown Away. London: John Murray, 2020. ISBN 978-1473663961.

== Awards ==
- 2016: Winner, Non Fiction category, International Rubery Book Award for Sea Journal
- 2017: 2nd prize, Giles St Aubyn Awards for Non-Fiction from the Royal Society of Literature, for Rag and Bone
