= Every Man for Himself =

Every Man for Himself may refer to:

- Every Man for Himself (novel), a novel by Beryl Bainbridge
- Every Man for Himself (1924 film), an Our Gang short film
- The Enigma of Kaspar Hauser, 1974 German film; German title translates as "Every Man for Himself and God Against All"
- Every Man for Himself (1980 film) or Sauve qui peut (la vie), a film by Jean-Luc Godard
- "Every Man for Himself" (Lost), an episode of Lost
- Every Man for Himself (album), an album by Hoobastank
- "Every Man for Himself" (song), a song by Neal McCoy from the album 24-7-365
- "Every Man for Himself", a song by Big Black
- Every Man for Himself (2021 film), a Chilean drama film written and directed by Alexis Donoso

== See also ==
- Devil Take the Hindmost (disambiguation)
- Man for Himself: An Inquiry Into the Psychology of Ethics, a 1947 psychology book written by Erich Fromm
