= Empires of the Indus =

2008 non-fiction book by Alice Albinia

- Author: Alice Albinia
- Language: English
- Subject: South Asia
- Publisher: John Murray (an imprint of Hodder Headline
- Publication date: 2008
- Publication place: England
- Pages: 366
- ISBN: 978-0-7195-6003-3

Empires of the Indus: The Story of a River is a non-fiction book by Alice Albinia published in 2008 by John Murray. It is a part-memoir part-essay recount of Albinia's Journey through Central and Southern Asia, following the course of the Indus River from Karachi to Tibet. Throughout the book, Albinia encounters and describes facets of culture and history, and relates them to the existence of the river. The book gives an insight into the communities as well as the history and political framework of the countries through which the Indus flows. Empires of the Indus was awarded the Jerwood Award by the Royal Society of Literature in 2005.

The Indus River is a transboundary river more than 3000 km long, originating north of the Himalayas, winding its way through Central and Southern Asia, and flowing into the sea in the province of Sindh, Pakistan. The history of human cultures and civilisations living alongside the river extends to at least 2300 BCE. Empires of the Indus is based primarily on Albinia’s own journeys along the Indus River in the early 2000s. Albinia uses the journey along the river to frame the relationships between the river, the populations that live alongside it, and the cultures and societal structures that have formed as a result.

Albinia’s journey begins in Sindh, Pakistan, at the headwater of the Indus, and extends along the river’s course through Pakistan, India and Tibet, with forays into Afghanistan along the way. Due to the fraught political situation in Afghanistan and Pakistan at this time, Albinia pays particular attention to conflict and violence, contemporary and historical, occurring along the Indus.

The content of the book is divided in 12 distinct sections, preceded by a preface. A map of the Indus river is given and several colour photographs. The book also has special sections named glossary, notes, select bibliography and an index. The glossary makes the book more understandable and comprehensible for readers not familiar with certain words and terms used in Pakistan, India and Tibet.

== Background ==
Alice Albinia studied at Cambridge University during the late 1990s, before leaving University to travel. From France, she ended up doing volunteer humanitarian work and travelling through Nepal and India. After several years working in Delhi, she recommenced study at the SOAS University of London. Having concluded study in 2003, Albinia began her journey along the Indus in 2003. From 2004 to 2007, Albinia made several trips to Pakistan, India, Tibet and Afghanistan, beginning the writing process in 2007.

Albinia’s Distinction in South Asian history from SOAS was, according to her, the initial phase of her full-time study into the history of the Indus river. Having spent two years working in Delhi, and observing national debates over culture and history, such as the rewriting of educational textbooks, Albinia came to the realisation that the Indian subcontinent had a deeper and more complex history than she had previously understood. Albinia is a cousin of the historian William Dalrymple who has divided his time between Delhi and United Kingdom for many years.

== Trips to Central and Southern Asia ==
Albinia made several trips to Pakistan, India and Tibet, with a one-off side excursion into Afghanistan. When possible Albinia utilised a range of local contacts, often friends, to facilitate travel and to engage with local cultures, but spent significant portions of the various journeys alone. Due to the geopolitical isolation of Tibet and Afghanistan, Albinia travelled alone throughout most of these regions. In an interview with Newsline Magazine she describes her experience of travelling through Afghanistan during the time of American occupation.

“It was not a problem at the time. I don’t know what it would be like now – different I think. If I had to go from point A to B and was passing through somewhere slightly tricky, I would just wear a burqa and no one would stop the car.” (Newsline Magazine, 2008). Albinia followed the curse of the Indus River upstream, from its headwater in Sindhu to its source in the Himalayas. As the river crosses multiple cultural and national boundaries, it often is part of the landscape in major regional and global conflict zones. At the time of Albinia’s journey, the two most notable conflicts in the region were ongoing, respectively the War in Afghanistan and the Kashmir conflict between India and Pakistan.

A notable difference, according to Albinia, was the difference in cultural religiosity between India and Pakistan: “I think this showy religiousness came in at the time of Zia. At any rate, it was a great contrast to my experience of India, where I hardly knew anyone who was so religious. In Pakistan, even if someone isn’t particularly religious, they’d never say it out loud – you have to be really careful about these things.”

Albinia’s varied experiences of India and Pakistan differed along these very particular cultural lines. In speaking about Tibet, Albinia described it as a region which ‘chafes under its colonisation by China’, a vastly different place to India and Pakistan, which runs parallel to the main ideas of Empires of the Indus, the Indus River being a place where not only have civilisations been created, but powers and empires have fought wars to control this vital river system, and this highly productive and culturally diverse group of populations.

== Reception ==
Empires of the Indus was well received, garnering interest through its presentation and scope. In his highly positive review in The Guardian, Kevin Rushby describes Albinia as a “determined writer and observant traveller with an ability to find the right person and listen to their story”. He notes that Albinia manages to find an optimistic message in this region of the world, “a message of beauty and hope in all the desiccated wastes, both physical and metaphysical”.

Robert Messenger, for Barnes & Noble, had similar praise for Albinia, identifying that the core of the story that she is trying to tell lies not in the history or culture of the places she visits, but in how these concepts, among others, are present and illuminating of the people she meets. Messenger also notes an underlying environmental message of Empires of the Indus: “Albinia despairs at the Indus’s great peril. Dammed repeatedly… the river completely disappears in places, or slows to a puddle-like trickle.”

David Gilmartin, for The Historian, conversely identifies that Albinia’s “deep engagement with history” separates this book from what is typically expected of the travelogue genre. He notes a particular engagement with historical literature relating to the various regions as a key part of this deeper understanding of her subject material. Gilmartin also notes a less hopeful angle of the book, that the there is an “impression of loss” and the modern states in the region “offer little that is good in Albinia’s eyes”. Gilmartin concludes that despite a deeper engagement with culture and history, Albinia’s view “shares something in common with many earlier imperial travellers”.
