= N.S. Nuseibeh =

N. S. Nuseibeh
- Born: Nuzha Nuseibeh; 4 May 1992 (age 34); East Jerusalem, Palestine
- Education: University of Edinburgh (MA); St Hilda's College, Oxford (PhD)
- Occupations: Writer; Academic
- Years active: 2014–present
- Family: Bashar Ahmad Nuseibeh (cousin)
- Website: www.nsnuseibeh.com

Nuzha Nuseibeh (born 4 May 1992), also known as N. S. Nuseibeh, is a Palestinian-British writer and academic. Her debut essay collection, Namesake: Reflections on a Warrior Woman (2024) won the 2025 Jhalak Prize.

== Early life ==
Nuseibeh was born in East Jerusalem. Her grandmother was from Ramle. Nuseibeh was raised in East Jerusalem, before moving to the United Kingdom to study. She graduated with a Scottish Master of Arts (MA) in English Literature and Philosophy from the University of Edinburgh in 2014. She completed a PhD in Education at St Hilda's College, Oxford in 2022.

== Career ==
Nuseibeh began her writing career contributing to Bustle and The Atlantic. Nuseibeh's short story "Love-life" was shortlisted for the 2019 Commonwealth Short Story Prize.

Via a five-way auction in 2020, Canongate Books acquired the rights to publish Nuseibeh's debut non-fiction essay collection, then titled She Carries My Name and originally set for a spring 2022 release date. Ahead of its release, Nuseibeh received 1st Prize at the 2022 Giles St Aubyn Awards for Non-Fiction. The book, renamed Namesake: Reflections on a Warrior Woman, was published in February 2024. Namesake won the 2025 Jhalak Prize in the prose category.

== Personal life ==
Nuseibeh is agnostic, culturally Palestinian Muslim, and a feminist.

== Bibliography ==
=== Collections ===
- Namesake: Reflections on a Warrior Woman (2024)

=== Short stories ===
- "Love-life" (2019)

== Accolades ==
Year	Award	Category	Title	Result	Ref.
2019	Commonwealth Short Story Prize		"Love-life"	Shortlisted	
2022	Giles St Aubyn Awards for Non-Fiction	1st Prize	Namesake	Won	
2025	Jhalak Prize	Proze	Namesake	Won	
