= Alice Albinia =

English journalist and author (born 1976)

- Born: 1976 (age 49–50); London, England
- Education: University of Cambridge; SOAS University of London
- Occupations: Journalist, author
- Notable work: Empires of the Indus (2008); Leela's Book (2011); The Britannias (2023)
- Relatives: William Dalrymple (cousin)
- Awards: Jerwood Awards (2008); Society of Authors' K. Blundell Trust grant

Alice Albinia (born 1976) is an English journalist and author whose first book, Empires of the Indus: The Story of a River (2008), won several awards.

Albinia was born in London and read English literature at Cambridge University and South Asian History at SOAS University of London. In between, she worked for two years in Delhi, India, as a journalist and editor. While in Delhi, she worked for the Centre for Science and Environment, the literary journal Biblio, and Outlook Traveller. Since 2012, she has taught writing at secondary schools with the support of the nonprofit First Story.

She was one of the three judges for the 2008 Jerwood Awards. Her debut novel, Leela's Book, is a modern story inspired by the Mahabharata.

Albinia was awarded a grant from the Society of Authors' K. Blundell Trust during the writing of her book The Britannias. This trust supports authors aged under 40 whose work "aims to increase social awareness".

Albinia is a cousin of the historian William Dalrymple.

== Bibliography ==
- Empires of the Indus: The Story of a River. John Murray, 2008. ISBN 978-0719560033
- Leela's Book. Harvill Secker, 2011. ISBN 978-0393343939
- Cwen. Serpent's Tail, 2021. ISBN 978-1788166607
- The Britannias: An Island Quest. Allen Lane, 2023. ISBN 978-0241669631

== Awards ==
- 2005: Royal Society of Literature Jerwood Awards for Non-Fiction for Empires of the Indus.
- 2009: Dolman Travel Prize
- 2009: Somerset Maugham Award.
- 2024: Longlisted for the Women's Prize for Non-Fiction for The Britannias
