= Andrew Murray Scott =

Andrew Murray Scott (born 1955 in Aberdeen, Scotland) is a novelist, poet and non-fiction book writer. His first novel, Tumulus, appeared in 2000, as the winner of the inaugural Dundee International Book Prize for unpublished novels, against 82 other manuscripts, winning the author £6,000 plus a publishing deal. A second novel, Estuary Blue, appeared in 2001 from the same publisher, Polygon, of Edinburgh. In 2007, a third novel, The Mushroom Club, appeared and Scott's fourth novel, The Big J published by Steve Savage Publishers Ltd, was published in April 2008 while a fifth novel In A Dead Man's Jacket, was published as an ebook in 2012. In 2019, Andrew published the first of a series of Scottish political conspiracy thrillers featuring freelance journalist Willie Morton, https://www.amazon.co.uk/Andrew-Scott/e/B07MQCTK9K/ref=dp_byline_cont_ebooks_1. Deadly Secrecy appeared under a shortened version of his name: Andrew Scott, and this was followed by 'Scotched Nation', in 2020 by 'Oblivion's Ghost' and in 2021, 'Sovereign Cause'.

Scott is also the author of ten non-fiction books including a biography of the first Jacobite leader, John Grahame of Claverhouse, Bonnie Dundee which was reprinted in 2000 and will soon be available from the publisher in ebook and POD formats. Andrew has written several other books about the history and culture of the city of Dundee, including Dundee's Literary Lives. A collection of poems titled Dancing Underwater, was published by Cateran Press in September 2009.

He is so far perhaps best known for his biographical work on the writer Alexander Trocchi (1925–84). His biography of Trocchi, The Making of the Monster, first published by Polygon in 1991, was reprinted in paperback in 2012 by Kennedy & Boyd. Scott also edited Invisible Insurrection: A Trocchi Reader, which appeared in tandem with the biography in 1991 and was reprinted in 1996. Both books proved influential in promoting reprints of Trocchi's work and led to a revaluation of his career and reputation, particularly amongst a new generation of Scottish writers such as Irvine Welsh, Alan Warner, Barry Graham and numerous others. The biography was widely-reviewed by critics and received acclaim from literary alumni such as Colin Wilson, Archie Hind, Edwin Morgan and Martin Seymour-Smith.

Andrew Murray Scott's archives are held by the Archive Service, University of Dundee. The collection includes manuscripts, books and correspondence by Scott from the 1970s to 2007 as well as photographs.
