= Rachel Hewitt =

Writer and lecturer in creative writing

Dr Rachel Hewitt FRSL
- Born: Rachel Hewitt
- Spouse: Pete Newbon (d. 2022)
- Awards: Royal Society of Literature Jerwood Award for non-fiction, Eccles British Library Writer's Award

Academic background
- Education: Corpus Christi College, Oxford (MA), Queen Mary University, London, (PhD)
- Thesis: Dreaming o'er the Map of Things: The Ordnance Survey and Literature of the British Isles, 1747-1842 (2007)

Academic work
- Discipline: English literature
- Institutions: Newcastle University
- Notable works: Map of a Nation (2010); A Revolution of Feeling (2017); In Her Nature (2023)
- Website: rachelhewitt.org

Rachel Hewitt is a British writer of creative non-fiction, and was a lecturer in creative writing at Newcastle University until 2023.

== Education ==
Hewitt attended the University of Oxford, where she studied English literature at Corpus Christi College for a BA and M.St. She completed a PhD in 2007 in English literature at Queen Mary University, London, with a thesis on romanticism and mapping titled Dreaming o'er the Map of Things: The Ordnance Survey and Literature of the British Isles, 1747-1842. In 2009, she was awarded a Leverhulme Early Career Fellowship, to the Department of English and Drama at Queen Mary.

== Writing career ==
Hewitt's first book Map of a Nation: A Biography of the Ordnance Survey was published in 2010 by Granta, and built on her PhD thesis work. Hewitt was awarded a Royal Society of Literature Jerwood Award for non-fiction for this project. In 2011, Hewitt was announced as one of ten BBC Radio 3 AHRC New Generation Thinkers.

Her second book A Revolution of Feeling: The Decade that Forged the Modern Mind was published by Granta in 2017, and explores the decade of the 1790s through the biographies of five people: poet Samuel Taylor Coleridge, philosophers Mary Wollstonecraft and William Godwin, medic Thomas Beddoes, and photographer Thomas Wedgwood. She was elected a Fellow of the Royal Society of Literature in 2018.

In April 2023, she published In Her Nature: How Women Break Boundaries in the Great Outdoors, a book which explores the histories of women's participation in sport and the 'great outdoors', interwoven with a personal memoir about loss. Hewitt was awarded an Eccles British Library Writer's Award in 2018 for this project.

=== Books ===
- Map of a Nation: A Biography of the Ordnance Survey (Granta Books, 2010); ISBN 978-1847082541
- A Revolution of Feeling: The Decade that Forged the Modern Mind (Granta Books, 2017); ISBN 978-1847085740
- In Her Nature: How Women Break Boundaries in the Great Outdoors (Chatto & Windus, 2023); ISBN 978-1784742898

=== Awards & Fellowships ===
- Leverhulme Early Career Fellowship in 2009
- Royal Society of Literature Jerwood Award for non-fiction in 2010
- Eccles British Library Writer's Award in 2018
- Fellowship of the Royal Society of Literature in 2018.

== Personal life ==
Hewitt has three daughters, and lives in Yorkshire. She was married to Pete Newbon, a lecturer in Romantic and Victorian Literature at Northumbria University in Newcastle, who died in January 2022. She is a keen runner and has been running since her mid-20s.
