= Gaynor Arnold =

UK writer

Gaynor Arnold (born 1944) is a Welsh-born author. Born in Cardiff, she studied English Literature at St. Hilda's College, Oxford, and obtained a Diploma in Social and Administrative Studies from the Department of Social Policy and Intervention, University of Oxford.

== Background ==
Since the early 1970s, Arnold has lived in Edgbaston in Birmingham, working as a social worker for Birmingham City Council. She became a full-time writer in 2009.

== Recognitions ==
Her debut novel Girl in a Blue Dress was published by Birmingham's Tindal Street Press in 2008, being longlisted for both the Booker Prize and the Orange Prize for Fiction.

== Bibliography ==
- Girl in a Blue Dress (2008)
- Lying Together (2011)
- After Such Kindness (2012)
- The Sea in Birmingham (2013) contributor
