= Dead Wood (novel) =

2009 novel by Chris Longmuir

- First edition
- Author: Chris Longmuir
- Language: English
- Publisher: Polygon Books
- Publication date: 2009
- Publication place: Scotland

Dead Wood is a 2009 novel by the British writer Chris Longmuir. It won the Dundee International Book Prize, the largest monetary British Prize for first novels, in 2009, and was published by Polygon Books. The novel is based upon the unsolved murders of 18-year-old Carol Lannen and 20-year-old Elizabeth McCabe in Scotland during the 1970s.

== See also ==
- 2009 in literature
- Scottish literature
