= Ramita Navai =

British journalist and author (born 1973)

- رامیتا نوایی
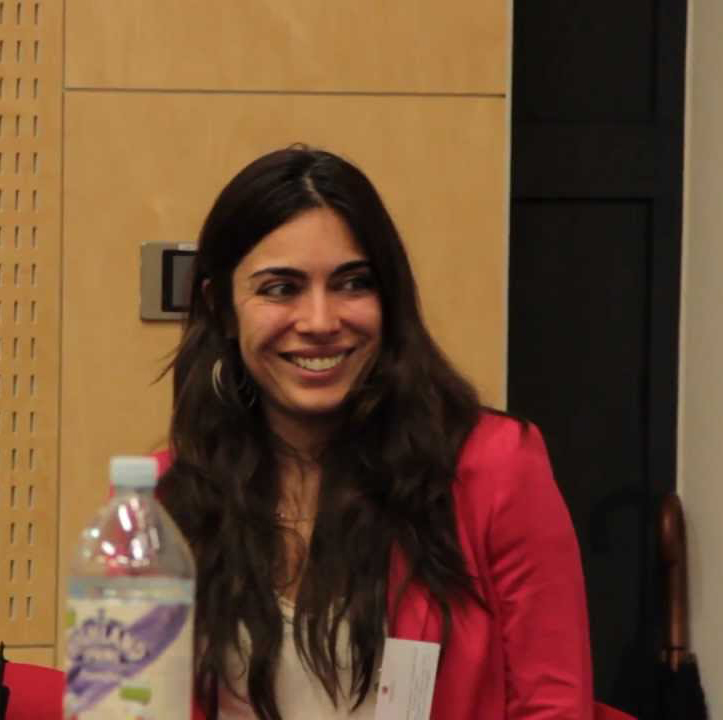
- Navai at the University of Birmingham, 2012
- Born: 21 July 1973 (age 53); Tehran, Iran
- Citizenship: United Kingdom
- Education: City, University of London
- Occupations: Journalist; documentary producer; author
- Years active: 2003–present
- Notable work: City of Lies (2014)
- Television: Unreported World

Ramita Navai (Persian: رامیتا نوایی; born 21 July 1973) is a British journalist, documentary maker, and author. She is known for her investigative human rights reporting in dangerous environments and has reported from over 40 countries.

Navai has won many awards, including two Emmy Awards, two Robert F. Kennedy Journalism Awards, and two Royal Television Society Awards, as well as literary awards, including the Debut Political Book of the Year Award for City of Lies: Love, Sex, Death and the Search for Truth in Tehran.

Navai appeared as herself in a scene with Mandy Patinkin in the TV series Homeland. She has been a guest on The Daily Show with Jon Stewart and has been interviewed about her life and work by Terry Gross for NPR’s Fresh Air.

She is the creator and host of The Line of Fire, a Top 10 Apple podcast about the moment of facing death.

== Early life and education ==
Ramita Navai was born in Tehran, Iran, on 21 July 1973. Following the 1979 Islamic Revolution, she and her family permanently returned to London, where her mother grew up. Navai attended Putney High School and has a postgraduate degree in journalism from City, University of London, where she was recognized as Young Journalist of the Year (2003) by the Broadcast Journalism Training Council for her short film on transgender legislation in the UK.

She was voted Alumna of the Year of the Girls’ Day School Trust in 2023 for her work with “women’s and girls’ issues in some of the most war-torn and conflicted regions in the world”.

== Career ==
Navai began her career in 2003 as the Tehran correspondent for The Times. She then joined Channel 4's critically acclaimed current affairs series Unreported World in 2006, making 20 documentaries. Her reports included vigilante killings in Guatemala, gang assassins in El Salvador, war in South Sudan, blood diamonds in Zimbabwe, femicide in Papua New Guinea, and state violence against Amazonian tribes in Peru.

Navai and director Wael Dabbous were the first Western TV documentary crew to film undercover with Syrian activists and fighters in 2011, for which she won her first Emmy Award.

Navai also made various features for ITN/Channel 4 News, including investigating child sex trafficking in India, and police gang-killings in Brazil.

Her investigative feature exposing a people-smuggling kidnap gang violently holding hundreds of refugees for ransom resulted in the Macedonian police arresting 16 people traffickers and rescuing nearly 200 refugees in raids.[5] [6] The report won The Foreign Press Association News Story of the Year, as well as a Royal Television Society award.

Since 2016, Navai has been making investigative documentaries for Channel 4’s Dispatches, Frontline PBS and ITV’s Exposure, about subjects including the war against ISIS and Shia militia assassins in Iraq.

Her documentary India’s Rape Scandal, about the cover-up of rapes in India by police and powerful politicians, was named as one of the Top 10 TV programmes of 2021 by the UK’s The Observer.

For her documentary No Country for Women (ITV)/Afghanistan Undercover (Frontline), Navai secretly filmed inside a Taliban prison, winning an Emmy award, a Royal Television Society Presenter of the Year award, a Grierson, a DuPont-Colombia silver Baton, a Rose d’Or and an Overseas Press Club of America Award.[citations needed]

Navai presented the findings of her documentary The UN Sex Abuse Scandal (Channel 4/Frontline) to MEPs in the European Parliament.

Her work has been used by human rights groups, such as Amnesty International, and in government reports. She has taken part in several UK parliamentary briefings.

She has written for many publications, including The Sunday Times, The Guardian, The Independent, the New Statesman, and The Irish Times.

== Author ==
=== City of Lies: Love, Sex, Death and the Search for Truth in Tehran ===
City of Lies: Love, Sex, Death and the Search for Truth in Tehran was published in the UK by Weidenfeld and Nicolson in May 2014 and in the US by PublicAffairs in September 2014. It has been translated into several languages. City of Lies won Debut Political Book of the Year Award at the Political Book Awards as well as the Royal Society of Literature's Jerwood Award. It was a Book of the Year in both the Evening Standard (2014) and The Spectator.

==== Reception ====
Nick Hornby said, “Navai’s gripping, heartbreaking book …City of Lies is an extraordinary piece of work about an extraordinary society.”

Richard Osman named City of Lies as one of his favourite books, saying it was a beautiful book that made him cry and changed his thinking.

Anthony Loyd said, "One of the world’s most exciting cities, as revealed by one of journalism’s most exciting women. Navai slips effortlessly into the boots of earthy, urban writer to tour Tehran’s ripped backsides in this intimate, grand guignol debut. She transports us through the Iranian capital’s multiple personas with deft and knowing navigation: never short of love for even the lowliest of her fellow Tehranis. An intimate and devoted portrait, lifting a beautiful truth from a city masked in lies."

Eliza Griswold, The Sunday Telegraph said, "Navai’s prose is startling ... Navai’s characters observe the wrecked beauty of the world around them. Through these observations, the book is elevated far above typical reportage."

Jon Stewart, The Daily Show stated, "The stories are beautiful, and they’re so well-detailed and nuanced."

=== Shifting Sands: The Unravelling of the Old Order in the Middle East ===
Navai wrote: “Iran Coming out from the Cold?” in this collection of essays written by academics and writers, including Avi Shlaim, James Barr, Khaled Fahmy and Selma Dabbagh and edited by Raja Shehadeh and Penny Johnson. Published by Profile Books.

==== Reception ====
Ian Birrell wrote in the Guardian: “The journalist Ramita Navai delivers a strong analysis of the tensions bubbling away in Iran and asks whether the emerging alliance between Tehran and Washington can ever be more than a temporary tactical union."

== Work & Awards ==
| Year | Work | Awards |
|---|---|---|
| 2024 | Israel’s Second Front Frontline, PBS | |
| 2024/2023 | Afghanistan Undercover Frontline, PBS | Winner: Emmy Award for Outstanding Investigation Winner: duPont-Columbia Silver Baton Winner: The Overseas Press Club of America David A. Andelman and Pamela Title Award Nomination: Emmy Award for Outstanding Research |
| 2023 | Afghanistan: No Country for Women Exposure, ITV | Winner: The Grierson Award for Best Current Affairs Documentary Winner: Rose d’Or Award for News and Current Affairs Winner: Royal Television Society Presenter of the Year Winner: Edinburgh TV Festival Best TV Presenter – Factual Nomination: BAFTA for Current Affairs Documentary Nomination: Rory Peck Impact Award for Current Affairs Nomination: British Journalism Award for Foreign Affairs Journalism Nomination: Broadcast Award for Best News / Current Affairs Programme Nomination: Royal Society of Television Journalism Award for International Current Affairs |
| 2022 | No Country for Women Exposure, ITV India’s Rape Scandal Dispatches, Channel 4 Iraq’s Assassins Frontline, PBS/BBC | Winner: Women in Film and TV award for outstanding achievement in News and Current Affairs |
| 2022 | Afghanistan Undercover Frontline, PBS | Winner: Gracie Award, Best Documentary - International Investigation |
| 2021 | India’s Rape Scandal Dispatches, Channel 4 Frontline, PBS | Nomination: Rose d’Or Award for News and Current Affairs |
| 2021 | Iraq’s Assassins Frontline, PBS/BBC | |
| 2019/2018 | The UN Sex Abuse Scandal Frontline, PBS Dispatches, Channel 4 ARTE | Winner: The Robert F. Kennedy Journalism Award for International Television Winner: Kindernothilfe Children’s Rights Media Award Nomination: Emmy Award for Outstanding Investigation |
| 2018 | Iraq Uncovered Frontline, PBS | Winner: The Robert F. Kennedy Journalism Award for International Television Nomination: Emmy Award for Outstanding Investigation Nomination: Emmy Award for Outstanding Research |
| 2017 | ISIS and the Battle for Iraq Dispatches, Channel 4 | Winner: British Journalism Award for Foreign Affairs Journalism Winner: The Frontline Club Broadcast Journalism Award Nomination: Rory Peck Impact Award for Current Affairs Nomination: One World Media Award for Television Documentary |
| 2016 | Macedonia: Tracking Down the Refugee Kidnap Gangs Channel 4 News | Winner: Foreign Press Association Award for TV News Story of the Year Winner: Royal Television Society Independent Journalism Award Nomination: Amnesty Media Award for TV News Nomination: Rory Peck News Feature Award |
| 2015 | City of Lies: Love, Sex, Death and the Search for Truth in Tehran Weidenfeld & Nicolson | Debut Political Book of the Year Award, Political Book Awards |
| 2013 | Egypt: Sex, Mobs & Revolution Unreported World, Channel 4 | Nomination: Foreign Press Association TV News Story of the Year Nomination: One World Media Television Award |
| 2012 | City of Lies: Love, Sex, Death and the Search for Truth in Tehran Weidenfeld & Nicolson | Royal Society of Literature Jerwood Award |
| 2012 | Honduras and Mexico: The Lost Girls Unreported World, Channel 4 | |
| 2012/2011 | Undercover Syria Frontline, PBS Unreported World, Channel 4 | Winner: Emmy Award, Outstanding Coverage of a Breaking News Story Nomination: One World Media Television Award Nomination: Rory Peck Impact Award for Current Affairs |
| 2011 | Breaking into Israel Unreported World, Channel 4 | Nominated: French-American Foundation Immigration Journalism Award |
| 2011 | Burundi: Boys Behind Bars Unreported World, Channel 4 | |
| 2010 | Zimbabwe's Blood Diamonds Unreported World, Channel 4 | |
| 2010 | Afghanistan's Child Drug Addicts Unreported World, Channel 4 | |
| 2010 | El Salvador: The Child Assassins Unreported World, Channel 4 | |
| 2010 | USA: Down and Out Unreported World, Channel 4 | |
| 2009 | Sudan: How to Fuel a Famine Unreported World, Channel 4 | |
| 2009 | Peru: Blood and Oil Unreported World, Channel 4 | |
| 2009 | Papua New Guinea: Bush Knives and Black Magic Unreported World, Channel 4 | |
| 2009 | Turkey: Killing for Honour Unreported World, Channel 4 | |
| 2008 | South Africa: Body Parts for Sale Unreported World, Channel 4 | Nominated: Amnesty Media Gaby Rado Young Human Rights Journalist |
| 2008 | India's Trafficked Girls Channel 4 News | Nominated: Amnesty Media Gaby Rado Young Human Rights Journalist Nominated: One World Media: Children's Rights Award |
| 2008 | Brazil: Murder in Sao Paolo Channel 4 News | Nomination: Amnesty Media Gaby Rado Young Human Rights Journalist |
| 2008 | Argentina: The Drug Paco in Buenos Aires Channel 4 News / More 4 News | |
| 2008 | Paraguay Elections Channel 4 News / More 4 News | |
| 2008 | Ecuador: Laron Syndrome and the Secret to Long Life Channel 4 News | |
| 2008 | Nigeria: Child Brides, Stolen Lives Unreported World, Channel 4 | |
| 2008 | Bangladesh: The Drowning Country Unreported World, Channel 4 | |
| 2007 | India: The Broken People Unreported World, Channel 4 | |
| 2007 | China: Chongqing: Invisible city Unreported World, Channel 4 | |
| 2006 | Unreported World, Channel 4 | |
| 2006 | Malaysia: Asia's Slaves Unreported World, Channel 4 | |
| 2003 | Postgraduate film on transgender legislation in the UK | Winner: BJTC Young Journalist of the Year Award |

== Books ==
- City of Lies: Love, Sex, Death and the Search for Truth in Tehran. London: Weidenfeld & Nicolson, 2014, ISBN 978-1-610-39519-9.
  - Vivre et mentir à Téhéran, Stock, 2015, ISBN 978-2-234-07808-6.
  - Stadt der Lügen. Liebe, Sex und Tod in Teheran, Kein & Aber Verlag, 2016, ISBN 978-3-0369-5750-0.
  - Orasul minciunilor, ISBN 9789734657698
  - Город лжи. Любовь. Секс. Смерть. Вся правда о Тегеране, 2018, ISBN 978-5-04-094684-6
  - Miasto kłamstw. Cała prawda o Teheranie, 2014, ISBN 9788379618842
- "Iran: Coming out from the Cold?" In Shifting Sands: The Unravelling of the Old Order in the Middle East, edited by Raja Shehadeh and Penny Johnson, 113–127. London: Profile Books.

== See also ==
- Unreported World, a Channel 4 documentary series
