= Nothing Human Left =

2011 novel by Simon Ashe-Brown

- First edition
- Author: Simon Ashe-Brown
- Language: English
- Publisher: Cargo
- Publication date: 2011
- Publication place: Scotland

Nothing Human Left is a 2011 novel by the Irish writer Simon Ashe-Browne. It won the Dundee International Book Prize, the largest monetary British prize for first novels, in 2011, and was published by Cargo Publishing. It is a psychological thriller based primarily in a Dublin state school.

== See also ==
- 2011 in literature
- Scottish literature
