= Alan Mahar =

English writer and publisher (born 1949)

- Born: 1949 (age 76–77); Liverpool, Merseyside, England
- Education: University of London
- Occupations: Writer, publisher

Alan Mahar (born 1949) is an English writer and publisher.

== Biography ==
Born in Liverpool, Mahar studied at the University of London before moving to Birmingham in 1976, working at Solihull College and living first in Sparkhill and then in Moseley.

He was a founder of the Tindal Street Fiction Group in 1982, and of the Tindal Street Press, where he is now the publishing director, in 1998.

His 1999 novel, Flight Patterns, tells the story of a French parachutist in Liverpool in 1957, while his 2002 second novel, After the Man Before, concerns urban renewal in 1980s Birmingham.

Mahar has had short stories published in journals including the London Magazine and Critical Quarterly.

== Published works ==
- Flight Patterns (Gollancz, 1999)
- After the Man Before (Methuen, 2002)

== See also ==
- List of English novelists
- List of publishers
- List of short story writers
