= Aida Edemariam =

Ethiopian-Canadian journalist

- Education: Oxford University; University of Toronto
- Occupation: Journalist
- Employer: The Guardian
- Agents: Rogers, Coleridge & White
- Notable work: The Wife's Tale (2018)
- Father: Edemariam Tsega
- Awards: Jerwood Award; Ondaatje Prize

Aida Edemariam is an Ethiopian-Canadian journalist based in the UK, who has worked in New York, Toronto and London. She was formerly deputy review and books editor of the Canadian National Post, and is now a senior feature writer and editor at The Guardian in the UK. She lives in Oxford. Her memoir about her Ethiopian grandmother, The Wife's Tale: A Personal History, won the Ondaatje Prize in 2019.

== Biography ==
Edemariam was born to an Ethiopian father and a Canadian mother. She grew up in Addis Ababa, the capital of Ethiopia. She studied English literature at Oxford University and the University of Toronto.

In 2014 her then forthcoming memoir, The Wife's Tale: A Personal History – the story of Edemariam's Ethiopian grandmother, Yetemegnu – was awarded the Royal Society of Literature's Jerwood Award for a non-fiction work in progress.

Informed by the author's 70 hours of interviews and conversations in Amharic with Yetemegnu, The Wife's Tale received favourable critical on its publication in February 2018 by Fourth Estate/HarperCollins, with the reviewer for The Times finding it "enriching", and Lucy Hughes-Hallett writing in the New Statesman: "To read The Wife's Tale is not just to hear about times past and (for a western reader) far away, but to be transported into them." Nadifa Mohamed's review in The Guardian praised the book as "a loving portrait of a grandmother, undiminished by the distances between the author and her subject", and Nilanjana Roy in The Financial Times described it as an "outstanding and unusual memoir" in which Edemariam traces a century of Ethiopian history through the life of her nonagenarian grandmother. Arifa Akbar, writing in The Observer, noted: "What brings this narrative flaring to life, though, is not the rigour of its research but its imagination and novelistic tone; Edemariam's prose climbs inside Yetemegnu's memories to inhabit them and bring her solidly, vividly, to life." Selecting The Wife's Tale as one of "the best books by African writers in 2019", Samira Sawlani on African Arguments concluded: "Aida Edemariam has gifted the world a priceless insight into history through her grandmother's eyes."

Edemariam was awarded the Royal Society of Literature's Ondaatje Prize in May 2019 for The Wife's Tale, which also was a finalist for a Governor General's Literary Award in Canada and was shortlisted for an Arts Futures Award in the UK.

She is a contributor to the 2019 anthology New Daughters of Africa, edited by Margaret Busby.

Edemariam has been a judge for the International Booker Prize and the David Cohen Prize for Literature.
