= The Man Who Wouldn't Stand Up =

2012 novel by Jacob M. Appel

- First edition
- Author: Jacob M. Appel
- Language: English
- Publisher: Cargo Publishing
- Publication date: 2012 (Note: Publication dates: 23 October 2012 according to Amazon and Waterstones; 27 October 2012 according to Amazon and Awesome Books.; 30 September 2012 according to Hannah's Books; October 2012 according to Worrell, Nate (22 May 2013). "The New York Yankees of Writing Competitions - Jacob Appel". The Competitive Writer.; 2013 according to Prairie Schooner and a 2017 author interview; Note that many of those bookseller pages providing early publication dates also list the shorter page counts not verified to exist in published editions. A publishing deal was part of the award from the Dundee International Book Prize announced on 25 October 2012. Reviews were published on 18 November 2012, 27 November 2012, January 2013, 18 January 2013, 1 February 2013, and March 2013)
- Publication place: Glasgow, Scotland
- Pages: 300 (Note: Sources disagree: 212 or 216 or 300 or 384. One printed edition of 978-1-908885-11-1 had 300. Perhaps the unpublished edition submitted to the Dundee Prize was shorter.)
- ISBN: 978-1-908885-11-1
- OCLC: 820112199
- Dewey Decimal: 813.6
- LC Class: PS3601.P662 M36 2012

The Man Who Wouldn't Stand Up is a 2012 satirical novel by the American writer Jacob M. Appel. It was the winner of the 2013 International Rubery Book Award. "Shortly after the attacks of September 11, 2001, in the United States," the author explained, "I knew I wanted to write a book against the backlash of those events. It took me three years to complete…. At the time, I did not think it would take me another eight years to find a publisher. I came close many times, but American publishers appeared to fear the political content of the work and several of them admitted this candidly or even asked me to 'sanitize' the novel." In 2012, it won the Dundee International Book Prize, one of the UK's most lucrative prizes for an unpublished debut novel, and was published by Cargo Publishing.

The title refers to the protagonist, a middle-aged botanist named Arnold Brinkman, who takes his nephew to Yankee Stadium for a baseball game. During the seventh-inning stretch, fans are asked to rise for the singing of "God Bless America" (Note: Some British sources incorrectly state that the song was the United States national anthem, likely presuming that "God Bless America" is the American national anthem due to the similarly titled UK national anthem, "God Save the Queen". "God Bless America" has never been the national anthem, which is "The Star-Spangled Banner". The Star-Spangled Banner is performed before every Major League Baseball game, never during the seventh-inning stretch. Following the September 11 attacks, "God Bless America" was frequently sung during the seventh-inning stretch, and appears in this context in the novel.) in honor of two Bronx soldiers killed in the line of duty. Arnold remains seated. "When the stadium cameras inevitably find him," wrote reviewer Steve Donoghue, "and put his picture up on the jumbo-tron for the fans and all the home viewers to see, Arnold does the unforgivable: he sticks out his tongue."

== See also ==
- 2012 in literature
- Scottish literature
