= Carolyn Steel =

British architect and food urbanist

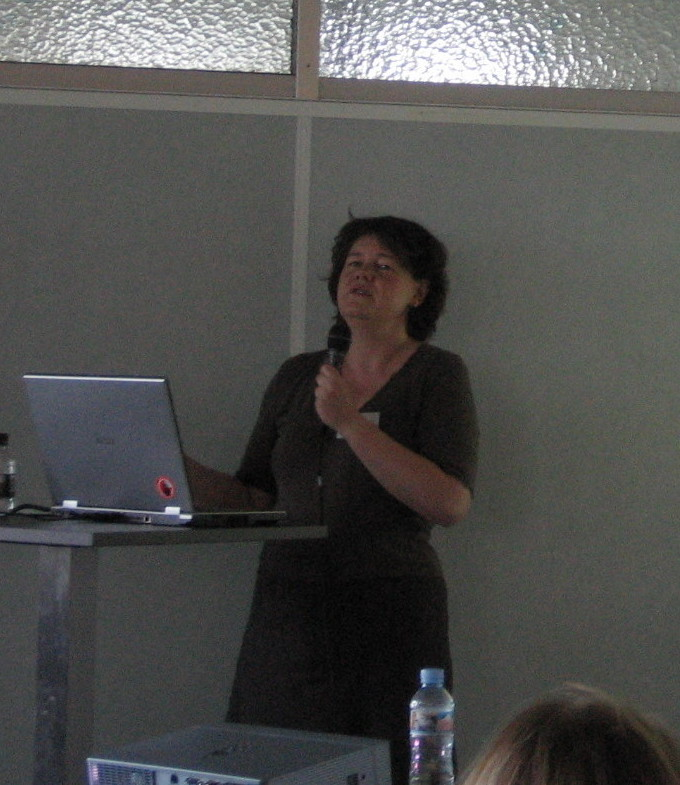
- Steel during a presentation in 2009
- Born: London, England
- Education: University of Cambridge; British School at Rome
- Occupations: Architect; writer; lecturer
- Website: www.carolynsteel.com

Carolyn Steel (born in London) is a British architect, writer, and lecturer. She focuses on the relationship between food and the city, and on urban development. Her bestseller, The Hungry City, was published in 2008.

== Biography ==
Steel trained as an architect at the University of Cambridge, graduating in 1984. From 1995 to 1996 she was a student at the British School at Rome, where she studied the history of the city. After graduating, she began working as an architect, combining this with teaching and writing. She has taught at the London School of Economics , the University of Cambridge, and London Metropolitan University. In 1989, she joined Kilburn Nightingale Architects, an architectural firm where she eventually became a principal.

In 2008 she published the book De Hongerige Stad (English: Hungry City). With this book she won the Royal Society of Literature Jerwood Award for Non-Fiction. The book describes, among other things, how food flows entered London and how they have developed over time. She criticizes the current way in which food is handled and indicates that it needs to be different. She also argues that cheap food does not exist. In the last chapter she discusses the Chinese eco-city Dongtan. In that chapter she introduces the concept of Sitopia. In her book she describes the food industry as a plaything of the market that is globalizing. In 2010 she became a visiting lecturer at the Wageningen University & Research. The following year the Dutch translation of her book Hungry City was published.

Steel was a presenter of the television program One Foot in the Past. She was also an editor for the magazine Building Design.

== Books ==
- Hungry City: How Food Shapes Our Lives (2008)
- Sitopia: How Food Can Save the World (2020)
