= Tom Whipple =

British science journalist

Tom Whipple is a British journalist. He has worked for The Times since 2006, and was the newspaper's science editor from 2012 to 2024. He is currently a science correspondent and columnist.

== Formative years ==
After attending Reading School in 1993–2000, Whipple studied maths and then computing until 2004 at Churchill College, Cambridge while writing features for the student paper. He was twice named student feature writer of the year by The Guardian and was a member of the Night Climbers.

== Recognition ==
In 2019, Whipple won the silver AAAS Science Journalism Award for his April 2019 story "Caucher Birkar — from asylum seeker to Fields Medal winner at Cambridge" for The Times Magazine. In 2015, he was named best print writer for his features in Intelligent Life by the British Society of Magazine Editors. In 2025, he won the Pharmaceutical Strategies and Innovation Richter - Semmelweis journalism award for his interview about Carol Jennings.

In 2024, he won the opinion or editorial award from the ABSW for his article "lessons from lockdown", published three years on from the first covid-19 pandemic restrictions. And in 2020, he was recognised as science journalist of the year at the Press Awards for his work reporting on the pandemic. His 2025 column 'Five years on, why the battle over Covid’s origins still rages' was recognised with the 2026 Harding Prize for Trustworthy Communication.

Whipple is a member of the advisory group of the Science Media Centre in London and has supported their view of the role of industry in science.

== Books ==
- The Battle of the Beams: The secret science of radar that turned the tide of the Second World War (Bantam, 2023)
- X and Why: The rules of attraction: why gender still matters (Short Books, 2018)
- How to Win Games and Beat People: Demolish Your Family and Friends at over 30 Classic Games with Advice from an International Array of Experts (2015)

== Personal life ==
Whipple lives in Reading with his wife, journalist and author Catherine Nixey, and their three children.
