= The Darkening Age =

Book by Catherine Nixey

The Darkening Age: The Christian Destruction of the Classical World
- First edition (UK)
- Author: Catherine Nixey
- Genre: History
- Publisher: Macmillan Publishers (UK); Houghton Mifflin Harcourt (US)
- Publication date: September 21, 2017
- Pages: 352
- ISBN: 978-0544800885

The Darkening Age: The Christian Destruction of the Classical World is a 2017 book by the British journalist and classicist Catherine Nixey. In the book, Nixey argues that early Christians deliberately destroyed classical Greek and Roman cultures and contributed to the loss of classical knowledge. The book was an international bestseller, was translated into 12 languages and was a New York Times Notable Book of 2018. The New York Times called it a “ballista-bolt of a book”. The book received positive reviews from academics such as Peter Frankopan, professor of Global History at Oxford University, and others who praised its style and originality. However, it received criticism from some scholars of late antiquity and the Middle Ages such as Averil Cameron, who accused it of telling a simplistic, polemical narrative and exaggerating the extent to which early Christians suppressed aspects of older Greek and Roman cultures.

== Content ==
After expressing the opinion that traditional historical narratives tend to depict pre-Christian Rome in an unfavorable light (chilly and nihilistic), Nixey proceeds to describe what she sees as an attack by Christians against classical heritage during Late Antiquity, which is a period generally encompassing the Later Roman Empire and the Early Middle Ages. The assault she alleges is both physical and cultural, taking the reader from the murder of Hypatia in 415 and the destruction of pagan statues, to the closing of temples and destruction of books.

For Nixey, these episodes of violent religious zeal are explained by a widely promoted belief that pagan religions actually harbored demons, and also by the powerful rhetoric Christian leaders used against the enemies of the early church. In that sense, she thinks the foundations of later religious persecution were laid at that time.

== Reception ==
=== Among the general public ===
The Darkening Age was chosen as one of The New York Times' "Notable Books" for 2018 and was listed on "book of the year" lists by The Telegraph, The Spectator, The Observer, and BBC History.

The book received widespread positive reviews in the media, including in the New York Times, The Spectator, and The Times. A. C. Grayling named it as his favourite book of the last 12 months.

=== Among scholars ===
Emily Wilson, Professor of Classical Studies at the University of Pennsylvania, gave the book a positive review, calling it "funny, lively, readable guide" to the darker side of early Christianity. Peter Frankopan, professor of Global History at the University of Oxford and director of the Oxford Centre for Byzantine Research, found the text "bold, dazzling and provocative" that challenges received ideas about early Christianity.

Professor Tim Whitmarsh of University of Cambridge said, "in seeking to expose the error and corruption of the early Christian world, Nixey comes close to veiling the pre-Christian Romans’ own barbarous qualities," but added it is, "a finely crafted, invigorating polemic against the resilient popular myth that presents the Christianisation of Rome as the triumph of a kinder, gentler politics." University of Oxford professor of ancient history Peter Thonemann says that Nixey makes broad generalizations based on limited evidence and that the Christian book-burning was not typically directed towards classical literature. Medieval historian at the University of Exeter Levi Roach called it "a salutary reminder of the darker side of the rise of Christianity" but argued the book endorses an outdated vision of the European Middle Ages as an intellectual backwater. Richard Tada, Ph.D. in ancient Greek and Byzantine history from the University of Washington, states that Nixey ventured "into areas where she is clearly out of her depth" and criticized the book for having "cherrypicked" incidents without considering contrary evidence.

Reaction from Christian and Jewish institutions and publication was also less positive, with criticism about the choice of sources, the limitations of the evidence presented and what they see as the author's tendency to draw wide conclusions from isolated incidents. Philip Jenkins at The Christian Century says: "This story may sound a lot like the familiar stereotype of Christian monks keeping alive the guttering flames of ancient civilization, a narrative that Nixey repeatedly mocks as a self-serving Christian fable. She would not do so if she had any grasp of the millennium following the fifth century. Some stereotypes are grounded in history. Others, like those that Nixey relies upon, are not." British historian Averil Cameron at The Tablet, and Dutch historian Johannes van Oort at Reformatorisch Dagblad are examples of this point of view.

=== Accolades ===
The book won second prize in the 2015 Royal Society of Literature Jerwood Awards for Non-Fiction and the Morris D. Forkosch Book Award for the Best Humanist Book of 2018.

== See also ==
- Persecution of pagans in the late Roman Empire
- Julian (novel)
- Against the Galileans
