= Catherine Nixey =

British journalist and author

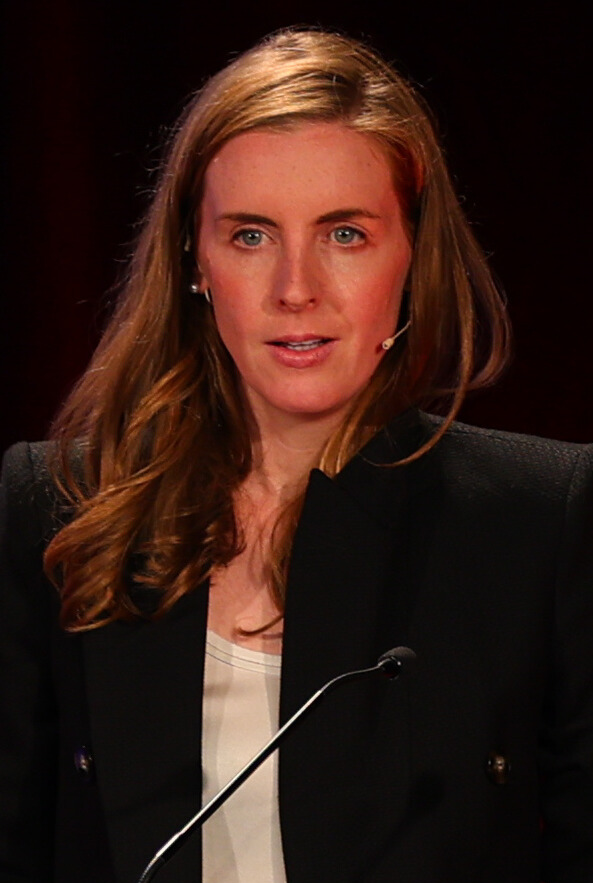
- Nixey in 2018
- Education: University of Cambridge
- Spouse: Tom Whipple
- Children: 3

Catherine Nixey is a British journalist and classicist, best known for her book The Darkening Age: The Christian Destruction of the Classical World. Nixey's work explores the cultural and religious shifts that occurred with the rise of Christianity in the Roman Empire, particularly focusing on the destruction of temples, art, and literature by early Christians. Her debut book won the Royal Society of Literature Jerwood Award for Non-Fiction and the Morris D. Forkosch Book Award from the Council for Secular Humanism.

== Early life and education ==
Nixey was raised in a Catholic family; before they met and married, her mother was a nun and her father was a monk. She studied classics at the University of Cambridge, later teaching the subject for several years before transitioning to a career in journalism.

== Career ==
After teaching classics, Nixey began her journalism career at The Times, where she worked as a radio critic and on the arts desk. In addition to her work at The Times, she has written for several major publications, including The Economist, the Financial Times, and The New York Times.

=== The Darkening Age ===
Published in 2017, The Darkening Age examines the transition from the classical Roman world to Christianity, arguing that early Christian zealotry led to widespread destruction of cultural heritage. Nixey's book challenges the prevailing narrative that the Christianisation of the Roman Empire was a benign or progressive development. The book was praised for its investigative rigour and engaging narrative style, with some comparisons drawn to Edward Gibbon, an Enlightenment historian who also critiqued early Christianity's role in fall of the Western Roman Empire.

In The Darkening Age, Nixey explores religious violence in both ancient and modern contexts. She draws parallels between the destruction wrought by early Christians on temples, statues, and books and contemporary acts of religious extremism. The book received critical acclaim, winning both the Royal Society of Literature Jerwood Award and the Morris D. Forkosch Book Award.

== Personal life ==
Nixey lives in London with her husband, journalist and author Tom Whipple, and their three children.

== Selected works ==
- The Darkening Age: The Christian Destruction of the Classical World (2017)
- Heresy: Jesus Christ and the Other Sons of God (2024)

== Awards ==
- Royal Society of Literature Jerwood Award for Non-Fiction (2015)
- Morris D. Forkosch Book Award from the Council for Secular Humanism (2018)
