= Act of Murder (novel) =

2010 novel by Alan Wright

- Author: Alan Wright
- Language: English
- Publisher: Polygon Books
- Publication date: 2010
- Publication place: England

Act of Murder is a 2010 novel by the English writer Alan Wright. It won the Dundee International Book Prize, the largest monetary British Prize for first novels, in 2010, and was published by Polygon Books. It is a historical murder mystery set in 1894.

The Courier described the novel as a "skillfully-executed tale" that was "particularly touching and full of pathos."

== See also ==
- 2010 in literature
- Scottish literature
