= Paul McDonald (writer) =

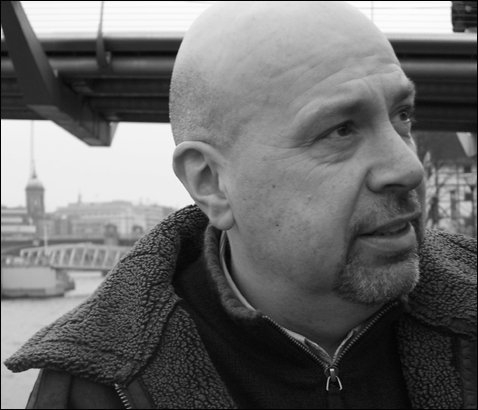
- Paul McDonald
- Born: Walsall, England
- Known for: Writer and academic

Paul McDonald (born 1961 in Walsall) is a British academic, comic novelist, and poet. He taught English and American Literature at the University of Wolverhampton for 25 years, where he also ran the Creative and Professional Writing Programme, and continues to publish widely.

He left school at 16 and began work as a saddlemaker, an occupation that provides the backdrop for his first novel, Surviving Sting (2001). After a period studying with the Open University, McDonald entered full-time education at Birmingham Polytechnic, where he began writing fiction, initially producing stories for the women's romance market under a female pseudonym. He later won a scholarship to research a PhD, and in 1994 took an academic post teaching American literature at the University of Wolverhampton.

His second novel, Kiss Me Softly, Amy Turtle (2004) is a comic mystery satirising the Midlands town of Walsall, while his third, Do I Love You? (2008), takes Northern Soul as its theme. His poetry began appearing in the early 1990s and embraces a range of themes and styles. Again humour is a feature, as is surrealism, but he also writes serious love poetry, and verse about art and travel. His poetry collections include Catch a Falling Tortoise (2007), An Artist Goes Bananas (2012), and 60 Poems (2023). McDonald's poetry has won several prizes, including first prize in the 2012 John Clare Prize, the Liverpool Poetry Prize (2022), and the Morecambe Poetry Festival Competition (2025). He has also written several books on poets and poetry, including Don't Use the Phone: What Poets Can Learn From Books (2023). His academic writing includes books on Philip Roth, Joseph Heller, microfiction, the fiction of The Black Country, and humour.

As a humour specialist, McDonald has made several TV appearances, including on BBC Breakfast and The One Show, and he is credited with identifying the oldest joke in the world. He discusses the latter, and some of the ideas contained in his book The Philosophy of Humour with Michael Grade in the BBC documentary Michael Grade & The World's Oldest Joke.

== Bibliography ==
=== Poetry and Microficrtion ===
- The Right Suggestion (1999)
- Catch a Falling Tortoise (2007)
- An Artist Goes Bananas (2012)
- Rimbaud's Hair (2017)
- Valuable Things (2018)
- Midnight Laughter (2019)
- 60 Poems (2023)

=== Novels ===
- Surviving Sting (2001)
- Kiss Me Softly, Amy Turtle (2004)
- Do I Love You? (2008)

=== Criticism ===
- Fiction from the Furnace (2002)
- Students Guide to Philip Roth (2003)
- Laughing at the Darkness (2011)
- Reading Catch-22 (2012)
- Reading Toni Morrison's Beloved (2013)
- Storytelling (2014)
- Philip Roth Through the Lens of Kepesh (2016)
- The Enigmas of Confinement (2018)
- Lydia Davis: A Study (2019)
- Allen Ginsberg: Cosmopolitan Comic (2020)

=== Philosophy ===
- The Philosophy of Humour (2013)
- Don't Use the Phone: What Poets Can Learn From Books (2023)

=== As editor ===
- Loffing Matters (2006)
- The Tipping Point (2012)
