= Clare Morrall =

English novelist

Clare Morrall (born 1952, Exeter) is an English novelist. She has lived mainly in Birmingham, where she worked for many years as a music teacher. Her debut novel, Astonishing Splashes of Colour, was shortlisted for the 2003 Booker Prize. She has subsequently had seven novels published.

== Works ==
- Astonishing Splashes of Colour (2003, Sceptre)
- Natural Flights of the Human Mind (2006, Sceptre)
- The Language of Others (2008, Sceptre)
- The Man Who Disappeared (2010, Sceptre)
- The Roundabout Man (2012, Sceptre)
- After the Bombing (2014, Sceptre)
- When the Floods Came (2016, Sceptre)
- The Last of the Greenwoods (2018, Sceptre)
