= Dundee International Book Prize =

Literary award (2000–2016)

The Dundee International Book Prize was awarded from 2000 to 2016. It billed itself as the UK's premier prize for debut novelists. It included a £5,000 cash award. The annual award was for an unpublished debut novel on any theme and in any genre, written in the English language. The Dundee International Book Prize was a joint venture between Dundee – One City, Many Discoveries and the University of Dundee. Entrants were worldwide. The prize was published by Birlinn from 2000 till 2010, with Cargo taking over from 2011 to 2014, and Freight Books from 2014 to 2016.

The 2017 prize was cancelled, after the first stage sift had taken place, since it was no longer able to guarantee the winning novel would be published.

== Winners ==
Andrew Murray Scott's book Tumulus (inaugural winner 2000) detailed bohemian Dundee through the 60s and 70s to the present day. Claire-Marie Watson's The Curewife won in 2002 and detailed Dundee's last execution of a witch – Grissel Jaffray in 1669. Malcolm Archibald's Whales for a Wizard which won in 2005 was an adventure story based around the whaling industry in Dundee in the 1860s. Fiona Dunscombe's The Triple Point of Water (2007) drew on her experiences of working in Soho during the 1980s. Chris Longmuir's Dead Wood (2009) was a grizzly crime novel set in a world of violence and gangland retribution. Alan Wright's Act of Murder (2010) was a tale of magic, poisonings and thespians, with some gruesome murders thrown in for good measure. Simon Ashe-Browne's Nothing Human Left (2011) was a psychological thriller set in a Dublin public school as a schoolboy's criminal desires reach a frightening conclusion. Jacob Appel's The Man Who Wouldn't Stand Up was a satire of Post-9/11 patriotism in the United States. In 2014 Amy Mason won for her novel The Other Ida. Martin Cathcart Froden who is originally from Sweden, fought off tough competition winning the 2015 prize with his page turner – Devil Take The Hindmost in which he brilliantly evokes the seedier side of interwar London. Devil Take the Hindmost was published by Freight Books in June 2016. Jessica Thummel was 2016 winner. The Cure for Lonely (originally titled The Margins) is the coming-of-age story of Sam Gavin, a trans man who moves from Kansas to San Francisco in the summer of 1989. It was published in June 2017.
