= International Emmy Award for Best Current Affairs =

Television award category

- Country: United States
- Presented by: International Academy of Television Arts and Sciences
- First award: 2007
- Currently held by: Dispatches: "Kill Zone: Inside Gaza"; United Kingdom (2025)
- Website: www.iemmys.tv

The International Emmy Award for Best Current Affairs is presented by the International Academy of Television Arts & Sciences (IATAS) to recognize the best current affairs programming produced and initially aired outside the United States. It was first presented in 2007.

The categories for international journalism were previously presented at the News & Documentary Emmy Awards alongside their U.S. counterparts. In 2025, they began to be presented at the International Emmy Awards Gala, along with the other categories

== Winners and nominees ==
=== 2000s ===
Year	Program (English Title)	Episode/Story	Production company/Network	Country
2007	Baghdad: A Doctor's Story		Guardian Films / BBC Two	United Kingdom
2007	Hot Line	"The Candelária Slaughter"	TV Globo	Brazil
2007	La Liga	"The Path of the Cocaine Leaf"	Cuatro Cabezas	Argentina
2007	Special Reporter: Vyacheslav Grunskiy's Studio	"The Zone of Love"	TV Channel Russia	Russia
2007	Sunday Report	"Give Us a Hand! Help Us Lie!"	Television Broadcasts Limited	Hong Kong
2008	Peter R. de Vries: Natalee Holloway		SBS Broadcasting / Endemol	Netherlands
2008	The Fifth Estate	"Cruel Camera"	Canadian Broadcasting Corporation	Canada
2008	Hot Line	"Césio 137"	TV Globo	Brazil
2008	Witness	"Red Mosque"	Al Jazeera English / Midwinter Productions	Qatar
2009	Dispatches	"Saving Africa's Witch Children"	Red Rebel Films / Oxford Scientific Films / Channel 4	United Kingdom
2009	Witness	"Return to Nablus"	Al Jazeera English / Flashback Television / Teachers Television	Qatar
2009	ARD Exclusiv	"Kindersklaven"	Westdeutscher Rundfunk	Germany
2009	The Team: Babies Traffic		Eyeworks Cuatro Cabezas	Argentina

=== 2010s ===
Year	Program (English Title)	Episode/Story	Production company/Network	Country
2010	Dispatches	"Pakistan's Taliban Generation"	October Film / Channel 4	United Kingdom
2010	Tuesday Report	"Child Abduction"	Television Broadcasts Limited	Hong Kong
2010	Enquête	"The Ultimate Forgiveness"	Société Radio-Canada	Canada
2010	Telenoche	"Glaciers, The First Veto"	Artear / El Trece	Argentina
2011	Back from the Brink: Inside the Chilean Mine Disaster		NHK	Japan
2011	21st Century	"Cambodia: A Quest for Justice"	UNTV	United Nations
2011	The Assassination of Jean Charles Meneses		Discovery Networks Latin America	Brazil
2011	Unter Piraten		infonetwork GmbH	Germany
2012	Haiti's Orphans: One Year After the Earthquake		CBC Television	Canada
2012	Profession: Reporter	"Children and Drugs: A Childhood Overtaken by Addiction"	TV Globo	Brazil
2012	China Dolls: Fragile Bodies, Strong Minds		Phoenix Satellite Television	Hong Kong
2012	Extra: The RTL Magazine	"The Merciless Traffic in the Flight from Africa"	infoNetwork GmbH	Germany
2013	Banaz: An Honour Killing		Hardcash Productions / Fuuse Films / ITV	United Kingdom
2013	Globo Repórter	"Enawenê-nawê: The Spirit-Men"	TV Globo	Brazil
2013	i-Witness	"Alkansiya (Piggy Bank)"	GMA Network	Philippines
2013	ZDFzoom	"The Fukushima Lie"	ZDF German Television	Germany
2014	The Fifth Estate	"Made in Bangladesh"	Canadian Broadcasting Corporation	Canada
2014	The Long Journey Home		Antena 3	Romania
2014	Journalism for All	"The Route of the K-Money"	Artear / El Trece	Argentina
2014	Sunday Report	"One Child Policy"	Television Broadcasts Limited	Hong Kong
2015	Dispatches	"Children on the Frontline: Children of Aleppo"	ITN Productions	United Kingdom
2015	101 East	"Stray Bullets"	101 East / Al Jazeera English	Malaysia
2015	ZDFzoom	"The Soccer Empire: The Dealings of FIFA"	ZDF German Television	Germany
2015	GloboNews Documentary	"Tower of David"	GloboNews	Brazil
2016	Dispatches	"Escape from ISIS"	ITN / Ronachan Films / Evan Williams Productions / Mediadante	United Kingdom
2016	101 East	"Afghanistan: No Country for Women"	Al Jazeera English	Malaysia
2016	Reportage im Ersten	"Long Thanh Wants to Smile"	ARD / NDR	Germany
2016	GloboNews Documentary	"Syria on the Run"	GloboNews / Globo TV	Brazil
2017	Exposure	"Saudi Arabia Uncovered"	Hardcash Productions / ITV / WGBH / Frontline	United Kingdom
2017	101 East	"Rodrigo Duterte: A President's Report Card"	Al Jazeera English	Malaysia
2017	Globo Repórter	"Art as Passport"	Globo Comunicação e Participações	Brazil
2017	Mission: Investigate	"The Panama Papers"	SVT / ICIJ / Süddeutsche Zeitung / Reykjavik Media / Yle / DR / NDR / RÚV / Première Lignes France	Sweden
2018	White Right: Meeting the Enemy		Fuuse Films / ITV	United Kingdom
2018	GloboNews	"Children of Maria da Penha"	GloboNews / TV Globo	Brazil
2018	Menschenschmuggler: Das Geschäft mit den Flüchtlingen		DR TV / ZDF German Television	Germany
2018	Off the Grid	"Silent Death on a Syrian Journey"	TRT World	Turkey
2019	Mission: Investigate	"Deceptive Diplomacy"	Sveriges Television / Mission Investigate	Sweden
2019	BBC Africa Eye	"Sweet Sweet Codeine"	BBC World Service	Nigeria
2019	Exposure	"Iran Unveiled: Taking on the Ayatollahs"	ITV / Hardcash Productions	United Kingdom
2019	Fantástico	"11 Days in North Korea"	TV Globo / GloboNews	Brazil

=== 2020s ===
Year	Program (English Title)	Episode/Story	Production company/Network	Country
2020	Exposure	"Undercover: Inside China's Digital Gulag"	Hardcash Productions / ITV	United Kingdom
2020	BBC Africa Eye	"Sex for Grades"	BBC Africa Eye	Nigeria
2020	GloboNews Documentaries	"Allies"	GloboNews / Globo TV	Brazil
2020	Mission: Impossible	"The Story of Swedbank and the World's Largest Money Laundering Scandal"	Mission Investigate / Sveriges Television	Sweden
2021	Exposure	"In Cold Blood"	Darlow Smithson Productions / ITV	United Kingdom
2021	Africa Eye	"The Baby Stealers"	BBC World Service	Kenya
2021	The Hunt for Gaddafi's Billions		VPRO Television	Netherlands
2021	Profissão Repórter and Fantástico	"COVID-19: The Daily Routine of a Healthcare Team Inside a Public Hospital"	Globo	Brazil
2022	In Search of Monsters		NDR Fernsehen	Germany
2022	Black Eye		BBC Africa Eye	Nigeria
2022	Exposure	"Fearless: The Women Fighting Putin"	Hardcash Productions / The Economist / ITV	United Kingdom
2022	Domingo Espetacular	"Parkinson's Research"	RecordTV	Brazil
2023	Off the Grid	"Ukraine Wartime Diaries"	TRT World	Turkey
2023	GloboNews Documentary	"Shelter: Innocents Under Fire"	GloboNews / Globo	Brazil
2023	Exposure	"The Crossing"	David Modell Productions	United Kingdom
2023	UVDA	"Last Stop Before Kyiv"	I.D UVDA / Keshet Media Group	Israel
2024	Sky News	"The Last Hospital: 30 Days in Myanmar"	Sky News	United Kingdom
2024	GloboNews Documentary	"Evel, Hazin: Days of Mourning"	TV Globo	Brazil
2024	The Trap: India's Deadliest Scam		BBC India Eye	India
2024	UVDA with Ilana Dayan	"Brother & Sister in Captivity"	UVDA Ltd. / Keshet Media Group	Israel
2025	Dispatches	"Kill Zone: Inside Gaza"	Basement Films	United Kingdom
2025	Philippines: Diving for Gold		Keyi Productions / Arte G.E.I.E	France
2025	Repórter Record Investigação	"Enforced Disappearances"	Record TV / Playplus	Brazil
2025	Walk the Line		Mediacorp Pte Ltd	Singapore
2026	Al Jazeera Investigates	"Hasina: 36 Days in July"	Al Jazeera English	Qatar
2026	Arte Reportage	"My Father's Hair"	Keyi Productions / Arte G.E.I.E.	France
2026	Exposure	"Breaking Ranks: Inside Israel's War"	Zandland / ITV1	United Kingdom
2026	Profession Repórter	"Feminice"	Globo	Brazil

== See also ==
- List of International Emmy Award winners
- British Academy Television Award for Best Current Affairs
