= Muslim women filmmakers =

Muslim women filmmakers represent a marginalized group of media makers and visual artists coming from countries where the dominant religion is Islam. Some of these nations include Iran, Afghanistan, Indonesia, Pakistan, Egypt, Mali, Palestine and Malaysia.

Muslim women filmmakers create films and videos that deconstruct female stereotypes through a unique, accessible and modern feminist lens. Film and other forms of widely distributed media provide Muslim women a channel to explore and revisit the roles they play within the constraints of societal and religious expectations.

Types of content created by these filmmakers include documentary, feature films, non-fiction or historical films, and television shows.

== History ==
The emergence of films by Muslim women is a recent 20th century development as more Muslims women have moved from being the subjects of entertainment to being behind the camera. Since the late 1970s, these filmmakers have shared similar views on their societies and histories and have used film to respond to them. The film industry has become a viable and realistic career path for Muslim women. Because of this emergence, more unique films are getting screened in film festivals and distributed in the West. Some of the first female-made films from the Islamic world were created in response to social and political revolutions such as the Islamic revolution in Iran, the rise of the Taliban in Afghanistan, and the secularization of the Turkish government.

== Films and filmmakers by country and region ==
=== Iran ===
It has been a difficult feat for Iranian female directors and filmmakers to break into the male-dominated professional Iranian film industry. Despite strict censorship and control from the Ministry of Culture and Islamic Guidance, several female filmmakers began to emerge in the 1990s. One of these filmmakers is Tahmineh Milani, is a feminist filmmaker from Iran that encouraged the creation of films that reflected women's perspectives and experiences. Female filmmakers in Iran also use the distribution of their films to make the public aware of the different roles Muslim women play in changing political environments. This is most prominently seen in Marjane Satrapi's film and comics Persepolis that illustrate the plight of women during the backdrop of the Iranian revolution. Rakhshan Bani-Etemad is another Iranian filmmaker that focuses on issues of poverty, prostitution, polygamy, divorce, and illicit love through her popular films.

=== Turkey ===
Since the founding of the modern secular Turkish state in 1923, the participation of women in the film industry has been encouraged. As a result, the number of female Turkish directors has increased since the early 2000s. Due to recent national and international funding for the Turkish film industry, low-budget independent films created by women have been increasingly produced. According to the research conducted by women's studies scholar Hulya Ugur Tanriover, since the birth of feature films in Turkey, women made only 1.6% of all films. Between 2004 and 2013, this figure grew to 8.2%. Female made Turkish films fall under the title of independent art house film or popular production. Independent films tend to focus on more taboo topics like incest, rape, motherhood, ethnicity, and women's employment.

=== North and Sub-Saharan Africa ===
There is a diverse collection of films produced by African-Muslim Women filmmakers that reflect on diverse African-Islamic cultures. Islam has been introduced into African cultures at different times, and films by African-Muslim women reflect this integration. These filmmakers comes from countries with majority Muslim populations like Chad, Mali, Niger, Senegal, Tunisia, and Egypt and incorporate television, film, video and documentary to focus on social, cultural and political realities of their African societies. Since there is a lack of funding for African women filmmakers, many produce work outside the continent. Some well known African women filmmakers that comment on the role of women in Islam through their films include Malian animation filmmaker Kadiatou Konaté, who reflects on the relationship between Islam and her Malian culture. Ethiopian filmmaker Salem Mekuria uses her films to examine the interaction between Muslim and Christian refugee women in Sudan.

=== Malaysia ===
The Malaysian film industry began in 1933 with majority of films being entertainment-oriented. Women currently represent a handful of all Malaysian directors and often become producers of films. Despite this shortage, three Malay women filmmakers gained prominence in the 1990s as they addressed socially relevant issues and what they perceived as Islamization through their films. Shuhaimi Baba in particular represented modern Malay women with careers, romances, and complex social relationships. Dr. Gaik Khoo, a film scholar and professor sees Baba's film Selubung as offering a "liberal feminist critique of the extreme nature of fundamentalist Islam". The only other Malay female filmmaker in charge of writing, producing and directing her own work is Erma Fatima. Fatima's films reflect the moderate stance the Malaysian political party at that time, UMNO, had towards women.

=== Pakistan ===
Pakistani women filmmakers have contributed largely to an effort to document and question their country's socio-political practices and histories. Some of the topic frequently covered by these filmmakers is the effect that religious fundamentalism, gender discriminatory Sharia law, and patriarchal tribal customs have on women and girls. Pakistani women filmmakers have chosen documentary film as their activist tool that investigates the human rights issues that exist in their society. Feminist centered documentary film offers these women a way to express their views to a larger audience in a highly restrictive political environment. One Pakistani female documentarian that has caught the attention of the Western world is Sharmeen Obaid-Chinoy who documents human rights violations against Pakistani women and girls. Another award-winning documentary filmmaker of Pakistani heritage is Deeyah Khan.

== Selected filmmakers and filmography ==
Tamineh Milani

- Children of Divorce, 1989
- The Hidden Half, 2001
- Two Women, 1999

Deeyah Khan

- White Right: Meeting the Enemy, 2017
- Jihad: A Story of the Others, 2015
- Banaz: A Love Story, 2013

Marjane Satrapi

- Persepolis, 2007
- Chicken with Plums, 2011
- The Voices, 2014

Rakhshan Bani-Etemad

- Kharej az Mahdudeh, 1986
- Zard-e Ghanari, 1988
- Pul-e Khareji, 1989

Shuhaimi Baba

- Selubung, 1993
- Ringgit Kasorrga, 1995
- Pontianak Harum Sundal Malam, 2004
- Tanda Putera, 2013

Erma Fatima

- Hati bukan kristal, 1990
- Daerah shafika, 1999
- Fantasi, 1994

Kadiatou Konaté

- Des Yeux Pour Pleurer, 1992
- Circulation Routiere, 1993
- L'Enfant terrible, 1993

Sharmeen Obaid Chinoy

- Saving Face, 2012
- A Girl in the River: The Price of Forgiveness, 2015
- Songs of Lahore, 2015

Zara Mahamat Yacoub

- Dilemme au féminin, 1994
- Les Enfants de la rue, 1995
- La Jeunesse et l'emploi, 1996
