= British Academy Television Award for Best Current Affairs =

Annual UK television award

British Academy Television Award
- Country: United Kingdom
- Presented by: British Academy of Film and Television Arts
- First award: 2002
- Currently held by: Gaza: Doctors Under Attack (2026)
- Website: http://www.bafta.org/

The British Academy Television Award for Best Current Affairs is one of the major categories of the British Academy Television Awards (BAFTAs), the primary awards ceremony of the British television industry. According to the BAFTA website, the category is "for single films, or films from a strand that are primarily concerned with unfolding current affairs"

The category has been awarded as one category merged with the Best News Coverage category under several names, from 1978 to 1985 and also in 1992 it was presented as Best Actuality Coverage while from 1993 to 1994 and then from 1998 to 2001 it was presented as Best News and Current Affairs Journalism. Finally, the category has been presented as Best Current Affairs since 2002.

== Winners and nominees ==
=== 2000s ===
Year	Title	Episode	Recipient(s)	Broadcaster
2002	Dispatches	"Beneath The Veil"	Production Team	Channel 4
2002	Endgame in Ireland		Norma Percy, Mark Anderson, Mick Gold	BBC Two
2002	One Day of Terror: New York Witnesses		Fiona Murch, Farah Durrani, Robert Moore	BBC Two
2002	Panorama	"Jeffrey Archer: A Life of Lies"	Terry Tyldesley, Michael Crick, Mike Robinson	BBC One
2003	Young, Nazi and Proud		Steve Boulton, David Modell, Richard Fabb	Channel 4
2003	Panorama	"Corruption of Racing"	Andy Davies, Stephen Scott, Gerry Troyna	BBC One
2003	Panorama	"Licence to Murder"	Mike Robinson, Eamon Hardy, John Ware	BBC One
2003	Palestine Is Still the Issue		Christopher Martin, Tony Stark, John Pilger	ITV
2004	The Secret Policeman		Simon Ford, Mark Daly, Toby Sculthorpe	BBC One
2004	Breaking the Silence: Truth and Lies in the War on Terror		John Pilger, Christopher Martin, Steve Connelly	ITV
2004	The Fall of Milosevic		Brian Lapping, Norma Percy, Dai Richards	BBC Two
2004	Terror in Moscow		George Carey, Mark Franchetti, Dan Reed	Channel 4
2005	Death in Gaza		James Miller, Saira Shah	Channel 4
2005	Nurseries Undercover: The Real Story			BBC One
2005	The Secret Angent		Simon Ford, Karen Wightman, Jason Gwynne	BBC One
2005	Tonight with Trevor McDonald	"Our Daughter Holly"	David Cohen, Jim Manson, Jeff Anderson	ITV
2006	Dispatches	"Beslan"	Eamonn Matthews, Kevin Sim	Channel 4
2006	Panorama	"Undercover Nurse"	Production Team	BBC One
2006	Dispatches	"Iraq: The Reckoning"	Samir Shah, Dimitri Collingridge, James Brabazon	Channel 4
2006	Storyville	"A Company of Soldiers"	Tom Roberts, Edward Jarvis	BBC Four
2007	Not awarded			
2008	Dispatches	"China's Stolen Children"	Jezza Neumann, Sky Zeh, Brian Woods, Kate Blewett	Channel 4
2008	Honour Kills		Ben Rumney, Juliette Murray-Topham, Emma Willis, Adam Kemp	BBC Three
2008	Dispatches	"Fighting the Taliban"	Sean Langan, Julia Barron, Denman Rooke	Channel 4
2008	Panorama	"Dog-Fighting Undercover"	Mandy Mcauley, Sandy Smith, Andrew Bell, Jeremy Adams	BBC One
2009	Dispatches	"Saving Africa's Witch Children"	Mags Gavan, Joost Van Der Valk, Alice Keens-Soper, Paul Woolwich	Channel 4
2009	Panorama	"Omagh: What the Police Were Never Told"	Sandy Smith, Brendon McCourt, John Ware, Leo Telling	BBC One
2009	Dispatches	"Mum Loves Drugs, Not Me"	Kate Blewett, Deborah Shipley, Brian Woods	Channel 4
2009	Ross Kemp: A Kenya Special		Clive Tulloh, Ewen Thomson, Matt Bennett, Ross Kemp	Sky One

=== 2010s ===
Year	Title	Episode	Recipient(s)	Broadcaster
2010	Dispatches	"Terror in Mumbai"	Dan Reed, Eamonn Matthews	Channel 4
2010	Generation Jihad		Peter Taylor, Leo Telling, Sam Bagnall	BBC Two
2010	This World	"Gypsy Child Thieves"	Liviu Tipurita, Sam Bagnall, Lucy Hetherington	BBC Two
2010	Dispatches	"Afghanistan: Behind Enemy Lines"	Najibullah Quraishi, Jamie Doran, John Moffat, Paul Woolwich	Channel 4
2011	Zimbabwe's Forgotten Children		Jezza Neumann, Xoliswa Sithole, Brian Woods, Deborah Shipley	BBC Four
2011	Panorama	"Kids in Care"	Simon Gilchrist, Roger Graef, Tom Giles, Clare Johns	BBC One
2011	Dispatches	"Lost Girls of South Africa"	Deborah Shipley, Brian Woods, Xoliswa Sithole	Channel 4
2011	Secret Iraq		Eamonn Matthews, Sam Collyns, James Jones, Philippa Lacey	BBC Two
2012	Panorama	"Undercover Care: The Abuse Exposed"	Joe Casey, Matthew Chapman, Paul Kenyon, Frank Simmonds	BBC One
2012	Bahrain: Shouting in the Dark		Jon Blair, Tuki Laumea, Hassan Mahfood, May Ying Welsh	Al Jazeera English
2012	Sri Lanka's Killing Fields		Callum Macrae, Chris Shaw, Jon Snow	Channel 4
2012	Panorama	"The Truth About Adoption"	Todd Downing, Tom Giles, Roger Graef, Clare Johns	BBC One
2013	This World	"The Shame of the Catholic Church"	Sam Collyns, Alison Millar, Darragh MacIntyre, Seamus McCracken	BBC Two
2013	Panorama	"Britain's Hidden Housing Crisis"	James Jones, Steve Hewlett, Rachel Crellin, Todd Downing	BBC One
2013	Exposure	"The Other Side of Jimmy Savile"	Mark Williams-Thomas, Lesley Gardiner, Alexander Gardiner	ITV
2013	Al Jazeera Investigates	"What Killed Arafat?"	Clayton Swisher, Adrian Billing, Naji Tamimi, Richard Belfield	Al Jazeera English
2014	Dispatches	"Syria: Across the Lines"	Chris Swayne, Eamonn Matthews, Olly Lambert	Channel 4
2014	The Cruel Cut		Richard McKerrow, Kieran Smith, Vicki Cooper, Leyla Hussein	BBC One
2014	Dispatches	"North Korea: Life Inside the Secret State"	David Henshaw, James Jones, Todd Downing	Channel 4
2014	Dispatches	"The Hunt for Britain's Sex Gangs"	Anna Hall, Matt Pinder, Paddy Garrick, Tazeen Ahmad	Channel 4
2015	Dispatches	"Children on the Frontline"	Marcel Mettelsiefen, Anthony Wonke, Stephen Ellis, Chris Shaw	Channel 4
2015	Panorama	"Ebola Frontline"	Steve Grandison, Lucie Kon, Karen Edwards, Fabio Basone	BBC One
2015	This World	"Terror at the Mall"	Dan Reed, Mark Towns, Sarah Waldron, George Carey	BBC Two
2015	Al Jazeera Investigates	"Inside Kenya's Death Squads"	Simon Boazman, Kris Jepson, Chris Olivotos, Phil Rees	Al Jazeera English
2016	This World	"Outbreak: The Truth About Ebola"	Dan Edge, Sasha Joelle Achilli, Eamonn Matthews, Sarah Waldron	BBC Two
2016	Dispatches	"Escape from ISIS"	Edward Watts, Evan Williams, Sam Collyns, George Waldrum	Channel 4
2016	Children of the Gaza War		Lyse Doucet, Lucy Hetherington, James Jones, Graham Taylor	BBC Two
2016	Jihad: A British Story		Deeyah Khan, Darin Prindle, Andrew Smith, Kevin Thomas	ITV
2017	Panorama	"Teenage Prison Abuse Exposed"	Production Team	BBC One
2017	Inside Obama's White House		Norma Percy, Brian Lapping, Paul Mitchell, Sarah Wallis	BBC Two
2017	This World	"Three Days of Terror: The Charlie Hebdo Attacks"	Dan Reed, Mark Towns, Luc Hermann	BBC Two
2017	This World	"Unarmed Black Male"	James Jones, Sarah Foudy, Sarah Waldron, Sam Bagnall	BBC Two
2018	Panorama	"Undercover: Britain's Immigration Secrets"	Karen Wightman, Joe Plomin, Callum Tulley, Gary Beelders	BBC One
2018	Raped: My Story		Catey Sexton, Jonathan Braman, Emma Wakefield, Ollie Tait	Channel 5
2018	Dispatches	"Syria's Disappeared: The Case Against Assad"	Sara Afshar, Nicola Cutcher, Callum Macrae	Channel 4
2018	Exposure	"White Right: Meeting the Enemy"	Deeyah Khan, Darin Prindle, Andrew Smith, Melanie Quigley	ITV
2019	Dispatches	"Myanmar's Killing Fields"	Evan Williams, Patrick Wells, Eve Lucas, Dan Edge	Channel 4
2019	Exposure	"Iran Unveiled: Taking on the Ayatollahs"	Production Team	ITV
2019	Massacre at Ballymurphy		Callum Macrae, Gwion Owain, Mark Williams, Charlie Hawryliw	
2019	Al Jazeera Investigations	"Football's Wall of Silence"	Production Team	Channel 4

=== 2020s ===
Year	Title	Episode	Recipient(s)	Broadcaster
2020	Exposure	"Undercover: Inside China's Digital Gulag"	Robin Barnwell, David Henshaw, Guy Creasey, Gesbeen Mohammad	ITV
2020	Dispatches	"Growing Up Poor: Britain's Breadline Kids"	Production Team	Channel 4
2020	Panorama	"Is Labour Anti-Semitic?"	Leo Telling, John Ware, Neil Grant, Rachel Jupp	BBC One
2020	The Hunt for Jihadi John		Anthony Wonke, Richard Kerbaj, Paul Monaghan, Jane Root	HBO/Channel 4
2021	Exposure	"America's War on Abortion"	Deeyah Khan, Darin Prindle, Andrew Smith	ITV
2021	Italy's Frontline: A Doctor's Diary		Sasha Joelle Achilli, Dan Edge, Ella Claire Newton, Paul van Dyck, Sarah Waldron	BBC Two
2021	Dispatches	"The Battle for Hong Kong"	Robin Barnwell, Gesbeen Mohammad, Guy Creasey, David Henshaw, Evan Williams	Channel 4
2021	Al Jazeera Investigations	"The Cyprus Papers Undercover"	Phil Rees, Sarah Yeo, Leonidas Sofogiannis, James Kleinfeld, David Harrison, Jason Gwynne	Al Jazeera English
2022	Exposure	"Fearless: The Women Fighting Putin"	Sarah Collinson, David Henshaw, David Alter, Sasha Odynova, Ksenia Barakovskaya	ITV
2022	Four Hours at the Capitol		Jamie Roberts, Will Grayburn, Dan Reed	BBC Two
2022	Trump Takes on the World		Norma Percy, Tim Stirzaker, Sam Collins, Tania Rakhmanova, Lucy Hetherington, Greg Sanderson	BBC Two
2022	Al Jazeera Investigations	"The Men Who Sell Football"	Phil Rees, David Harrison, Jason Gwynne, Sarah Yeo, Nicholas Dove, Naji Tamimi	Al Jazeera English
2023	Children of the Taliban		Marcel Mettelsiefen, Jordan Bryon, Juan Camilo Cruz, Stephen Ellis, Aman Sadat	Channel 4
2023	Exposure	"Afghanistan: No Country for Women"	Ramita Navai, Karim Shah, Eamonn Matthews, Mark Summers, Ali Watt	ITV
2023	Exposure	"The Crossing"	Handa Majed, David Modell, Ella Newton, Jamie Welham, Nechirvan Mando, Ben Ferguson	ITV
2023	Panorama	"Mariupol: The People's Story"	Robin Barnwell, Guy Creasey, Hilary Andersson, Darren Kemp, Tom Stone, Serhiy Solodko	BBC One
2024	This World	"The Shamima Begum Story"	Joshua Baker, Sara Obeidat, Sasha Joelle Achilli, Sarah Waldron, Simon McMahon, Mustafa Al-Ali	BBC Two
2024	Storyville	"Inside Russia: Traitors and Heroes"	Paul Mitchell, Anastasia Popova, Mikhail Kozyrev, Daria Olevskaya, Monica Garnsey, Mustafa Khalili	BBC Four
2024	Putin vs the West		Norma Percy, Tim Stirzaker, Lucy Hetherington, Lotte Murphy-Johnson, Max Stern	BBC Two
2024	Dispatches	"Russel Brand: In Plain Sight"	Production Team	Channel 4
2025	State of Rage		Marcel Mettelsiefen, Ahisha Ghafoor, Stephen Ellis, Ismail Hussam Banighorra, Aviya Shar-Yashuv, Mayte Carrasco	Channel 4
2025	Exposure	"Maternity: Broken Trust"	Laura Warner, Becky Southworth, Tom Keeling, Emma Lysaght, Lewis Albrow, Martin Kayser-Landwehr	ITV1
2025	Exposure	"Ukraine's War: The Other Side"	Sean Langan, Leslie Knott, Matt Scholes	ITV1
2025	Storyville	"Life and Death in Gaza"	Natasha Cox, Lara El Gibaly, Haya Al Badarneh, Sarah Keeling, Simon Cox, Mustafa Khalili	BBC Two
2026	Gaza: Doctors Under Attack		Ramita Navai, Karim Shah, Ben de Pear, Melanie Quigley, Menna Hijazi, Jaber Badwan	Channel 4
2026	Exposure	Breaking Ranks: Inside Israel's War	Benjamin Zand, Matan Cohen, Maya Rostowska, Josh Reynolds, Rhiannon Mayor, Mel McCowan	ITV1
2026	The Covid Contracts: Follow the Money		Davina Bristow, Jenna Weiler, Will Hecker, Russell Scott, Einav Leshetz Lovatt, Brian Woods	ITV1
2026	Panorama	Undercover in the Police	Karen Wightman, Leo Telling, Joe Plomin, Rory Bibb, Adrian Polglase, Gary Beelders	BBC One

- Note: The series that don't have recipients on the tables had Production team credited as recipients for the award or nomination.
