= Sister-hood =

Women's organizations based in Norway

- Formation: 2007 by Deeyah Khan
- Official language: English
- Website: sister-hood.com

Sister-hood is an international platform for the voices of women of Muslim heritage founded in 2007 by Norwegian, film-maker and human rights activist Deeyah Khan through her media and arts production company Fuuse.

Sister-hood was relaunched in 2016 as a global online magazine and live events platform promoting the voices of women of Muslim heritage. Within six month of its relaunch as an online magazine, Sister-hood won Espoke Living Best Website at the 2016 Asian Media Awards for highlighting female equality as well as creating awareness of issues affecting Muslim women. Sister-hood magazine ambassadors include Farida Shaheed from Pakistan, Egyptian Mona Eltahawy, Palestinian Rula Jebreal, Leyla Hussein of Somali heritage, and Algerian Marieme Helie Lucas.

== Goals ==
The goals of sister-hood are to promote known and unknown women of Muslim heritage working for human rights, gender equality, freedom of expression, peace, and social justice, and to highlight women from history and today who have fought for personal rights and bodily integrity, who extended solidarity to women and other downtrodden people, and who improved their societies as scholars, artists, saints, and activists.

"We are endlessly spoken for, and spoken about. It's time we got to speak for ourselves".
—Deeyah in an interview with Anealla Safdar for Aljazeera.

== History ==
Sister-hood originally started in 2007 as an Online Mixtape, featuring the unreleased songs by young female rappers, singers and poets of Muslim heritage from Europe and the United States, to promote the creativity of women who often faced barriers in expressing themselves creatively. Khan stated that "many of them have been actively discouraged, even by their own communities, from expressing their thoughts and dreams through music," a situation which she had faced herself in her early career as a musician. The young women's tracks dealt with a variety of issues, from war, racism, love, romance, living in a post-9/11 world, women's rights issues, identity, sexuality, a sense of belonging, faith, and the personal experiences of being young, socially conscious Muslim women in the West.

== Projects ==
- Sisterhood Online Mixtape (2008) is the first project presented by Sisterhood.
- In 2015, Deeyah and Fuuse produced World Woman, a two-day conference in Oslo which brought together feminists like Nawal El Saadawi, Hina Jilani, Mona Eltahawy, Shirin Ebadi, Farida Shaheed, Yanar Mohammed, Leyla Hussein, and others. The positive reactions from the women inspired Deeyah to reignite Sister-hood as a much larger project taking the form of a Sister-hood magazine and a series of Sister-hood live events as platforms for known and unknown voices of women of Muslim heritage.
- The online magazine Sister-hood was launched on 16 May 2016, announced on BBC Woman's Hour. In an interview with Al Jazeera, Khan described the magazine as shattering stereotypes around women of Muslim heritage, and providing an outlet for women's rights activists who challenge the status quo both within and outside the Muslim world. She expressed a determination to use the platform as a means to develop activism and increase the representation of women of Muslim origin in the public sphere.

The launch edition included articles from Nawal el-Sadaawi, Karima Bennouce, Rula Jebreal, and Sanam Naraghi-Anderlini. With art and multimedia content as well as written articles, the magazine aims to reflect the diversity of women of Muslim heritage, with a broad characterisation of what it means to have a Muslim identity. Deeyah said to Al Jazeera: "Sister-hood is for all women and girls of Muslim heritage, regardless of age, ethnicity or sexuality. Former Muslims, cultural Muslims, and agnostics are just as welcome to contribute and participate as the devout; all sects and denominations are welcome." The magazine is funded by Khan herself, with a small grant from Norwegian Freedom of Expression foundation Fritt Ord.

Sister-hood magazine founder and editor-in-chief is Deeyah Khan. Deputy editor-in-chief is Dr. J. Payton. Managing editor is Afak Afgun, Asia editor is Hyshyama Hamin, and deputy editor is Mediah Ahmed.
