= Sunday Report =

Sunday Report may refer to:

- Sunday Report (Canadian TV series)
- Sunday Report (Hong Kong TV series)
- Sandys Report 1957 Defence White Paper
