= Abu Usamah =

American imam

Imam Abu Usamah At-Thahabi
- Born: New Jersey, United States
- Education: Islamic University of Medina Category:Islamic University of Madinah alumni
- Occupations: Instructor, Imam
- Era: Modern
- Known for: Controversial views

Abu Usamah at-Thahabi is an Imam at Green Lane Masjid in Birmingham, England.

An American national, he converted to Islam and studied at the Salafi-oriented University of Madinah in Saudi Arabia, an Islamic school popular with converts and international students.

== Controversies ==
=== The Undercover Mosque ===
During Abu Usamah's tenure at Green Lane Masjid, he was among a group of preachers whom were the focus of the Undercover Mosque program which was first aired on 15 January 2007 by Channel 4. In the program, Abu Usamah was quoted, among other things, to have said that "Christians and Jews are enemies to Muslims", to have taught that "jihad is coming against the unbelievers", and to have referred to non-Muslims by use of the term "kuffar" which translates to "unbelievers" or people who reject Islam.

The story caused backlash that resulted in 364 viewer complaints to Ofcom. In addition to this, on 10 August 2007 the West Midlands Police also raised a formal complaint to Ofcom regarding what it considered to be a "completely distorted" view of the intended message by Abu Usamah and the other preachers. However, upon investigation of the matter Ofcom ruled in favour of Channel 4. The West Midlands Police also later apologised for their initial accusation, and offered £100,000 in compensation to Channel 4.

=== Other controversies ===
According to a report by the Centre for Social Cohesion, Usamah "advocates holy war in an Islamic state; preaches hatred against non-Muslims; that apostasy and homosexuality are punishable by death; and that women are inferior to men", following an undercover recording of him preaching to his congregation which featured in a Channel 4 Dispatches episode on radical Islam at British universities. During the documentary, Usamah also praised Osama bin Laden, and defended his right to freedom of expression, saying: "If I were to call homosexuals perverted, dirty, filthy dogs who should be murdered, that's my freedom of speech, isn't it?" Usamah also stated that "He (Osama bin Laden) is better than a million George Bushs, he's better than a thousand Tony Blairs."

Usamah was invited to speak at events held by University College London's Islamic Society on 1 February 2008 and 6 September 2009. He was invited to speak at the same venue on 30 November 2009, but the event was cancelled due to pressure from gay rights and anti-extremism campaign groups. In February 2013, he was invited to speak at the University of Reading, but the event was cancelled by the university after threats of violence.

In 2012, Usamah was accused of sexually harassing Muslim women, but a mosque spokesman said: “We have not been contacted by anybody regarding allegations of harassment, sexual or otherwise, against Abu Usamah who remains an employee of the mosque. However, we have been made aware of the website and note that it appears unable to back up these serious allegations with any proper proof.”
