= World Woman =

- Official Logo
- Founded: 2015 (Oslo, Norway)
- Organiser: Fuuse

WORLD WOMAN is a festival of art and activism in Oslo founded in 2015 by filmmaker and activist Deeyah Khan. The festival highlights the voices of artists and activists from around the world and promotes courage, creativity and compassion through human rights, freedom of expression, equality and peace. The event was produced by Fuuse and it took place on the 30th and 31 January 2015 in the Riksscenen with the support of Norway's Ministry of Foreign Affairs. WORLD WOMAN is planned as an annual event.

== 2015 event ==
World Woman 2015 theme was Courage and Creativity.

The inaugural World Woman festival featured performances by Mari Boine, Marilyn Mazur, John McLaughlin, Mahsa Vahdat, Sister Fa, Pakistani dancer Sheema Kermani, founder of Tehrik-e-Niswan, Fahmida Riaz, Viktoria Mullova, Gary Husband, Bugge Wesseltoft, Eivind Aarset, Hela Fattoumi, Arve Henriksen.

World Woman conversations and talks included Shirin Ebadi, Nawal El Saadawi, Hina Jilani, Sanam Naraghi-Anderlini, International Civil Society Action Network (ICAN), Gro Brundtland, Scilla Elworthy, Şafak Pavey, Mona Eltahawy, Gurpreet Kaur Bhatti, Kenan Malik, Ayşe Önal, Sister Rosemary Nyirumbe, Fawzia Koofi, Farida Shaheed, Natalia Koliada of Belarus Free Theatre, Leyla Hussein, Yanar Mohammed, Gabrielle Rifkind, Rana Husseini.

Messages of support and solidarity were recorded by Patrick Stewart, Erna Solberg, Sinéad O'Connor, Kofi Annan, Sting and Richard Branson.

=== Coverage ===
WORLD WOMAN was covered in Volkskrant, The Guardian, Huffington Post, The Independent and on BBC4's Woman's Hour as well as the Norwegian press.
