= Saltley Gate Peace Group =

Interfaith organisation

Saltley Gate Peace Group

The Saltley Gate Peace Group (SGPG) is an inner city interfaith organisation based in Birmingham, England.

== Background ==
The SGPG was initially formed as a joint Christian/Muslim peace initiative in response to the threat of war in Iraq as a part of the growing peace movement in Britain following 9/11. It played an active role supporting the Stop the War Coalition in the city, encouraged local activism through a united faith-based front and continues to participate in the anti-war movement (along with its other work).

== Community ==
The SGPG has since become more community based, working with various authorities to ensure a better quality of public service for residents in the more deprived areas of Birmingham.

The organisation also takes a tough stance on vandalism, racism and crime and encourages inter-religious dialogue. It works closely with Birmingham Citizens and the Birmingham Quaker-Muslim Peace and Social Justice Group.

== Campaigns ==
Amongst its causes has been working with faith leaders to prevent the promotion of glorification of terrorism amongst younger Muslims in the inner city.

In 2005, the SGPG also called on the West Midlands Police to ban the flying of Pakistani flags in the city during the festival of Eid to prevent racial tensions. This followed a similar ban enforced in London.

In January 2007, the group publicly supported the city's Green Lane Mosque against accusations of extremism, made in the Channel 4 documentary Undercover Mosque.

== Founders ==
The SGPG was founded by Methodist minister Simon Topping and community activist Adam Yosef in 2003. It is currently based at the Saltley Methodist Church in the West Midlands and supported by Reverend Chris Shannahan, founder of youth programme Yeast in the City.

== Sources ==
- Police hunt killer of Birmingham stab victim – Birmingham Mail, March 2009
- Man, 20, 'critical' after shooting in shop – Birmingham Post, February 2008
- Man gunned down in shop – Birmingham Mail, February 2008
- Anger over anti-British hate posters – Birmingham Mail, May 2007
- Birmingham's Muslims fear reprisals after anti-terror raids – The Independent, February 2007
- Birmingham rocked by terror raids – The Asian Today, February 2007
- Terror arrests anger community – BBC News, February 2007
- Communities must unite – Birmingham Post, February 2007
- Terror arrests: A call for calm – Birmingham Post, February 2007
- Community leaders fear raids could be 'damaging – Birmingham Mail, February 2007
- Channel 4 accused of creating mischief over portrayal of Black Muslim in Dispatches documentary Black Britain, January 2007
- Channel 4 Blasted for Demonising Muslims MD News, January 2007
- Mosque launches probe after TV claims Birmingham Mail, January 2007
- Faces behind the faith – BBC Birmingham, July 2005
- City outrage over pro-Osama poster Evening Mail, September 2004
- Muslim leaders outraged by bin Laden posters Birmingham Post, September 2004
- Mission alongside the poor The Methodist Church of Great Britain, 2003/2004
