= Sisterhood Online Mixtape =

Compilation album by various artists

Sisterhood Online Mixtape (2008)

Compilation album (mixtape) by Various Artists
- Released: by Deeyah Khan
- Genres: Rap, hip hop, spoken word, pop

Sisterhood Online Mixtape is the first project of Sisterhood. This was an online mixtape. Deeyah Presents Sisterhood was launched in May 2008. The Mixtape was started through MySpace and placed online for free to remain true to its birth through the Internet. Deeyah Khan connected with young Muslim women online who were aspiring rappers, singers and poets. This Sisterhood collection became the first online mixtape of its kind. The reactions to this mixtape project were primarily positive and very supportive from the Western media and Muslim community.

Muslim Council of Great Britain (MCB) deputy secretary general Dr Daud Abdullah cast concern towards the project in a statement, saying "according to Islam, Women artists should refrain from performing before a mixed audience". And "The Islamic view is that women should not draw unnecessary attention to themselves, because of the impact this will have on a male audience. The moral framework of Islam has already been laid down and women should not push beyond its boundaries for the sake of commercial gain."

Deeyah has indicated that she will continue supporting young Muslim women and will keep the Sisterhood initiative going.

"This is just the first small step towards encouraging these young women and others like them out there to pursue their dreams and hopes. And, a way to let them know they are not alone in their struggles, fears and hardship" says Deeyah."Although many of the Sisterhood ladies are at the very beginning of their artistic journey and just starting to explore and discover their creative and artistic expression, I hope that through Sisterhood they will find inspiration and encouragement from each other to further develop and hone their craft. Hopefully we can help create a platform to have their voices and opinions heard as both artists and Muslim women living in Western societies."

DEEYAH PRESENTS SISTERHOOD Online Mixtape (2008): Not for sale. Streamed online on the World Wide Web from 2008.

- Artist: Lady Dizzla – Song: I Won't Cry
- Artist: Jus1Jam (feat. Kiran Zamman) – Song: "Ride (a Requiem)"
- Artist: MC Suriya – Song: "Breakin The Silence" (G-Beatz_PipeLineProductions)
- Artist: Shaheen – Song: "Revolution"
- Artist: Neelofer Mir – Song: "Poet"
- Artist: Kiran Zamman – Song: "I Have A Dream"
- Artist: Lyrical Lailah – Song: "Un-Abused"
- Artist: Lady Massacre – Song: "Life"
- Artist: Elly & Khai – Song: "Waters"
- Artist: Phoenix – Song: "Leap of Faith"
- Artist: Dizie Mc – Song: "Inspecta"
- Artist: Laydee Sly – Song: Kitaab
- Artist: Yasslam – Song: "Belle Algerie"
- Artist: Nia-V – Song: "6 Degrees Of Separation"
- Artist: Kayla Lahmar – Song: "How Did We Get Here"
