= Exposure (British TV series) =

UK TV series

- Genre: News; Current affairs; Human interest
- Narrated by: Various
- Country of origin: United Kingdom
- Original language: English
- No. of episodes: 25

Production
- Running time: 60 minutes (inc. adverts)
- Production company: Various

Original release
- Network: ITV
- Release: 26 September 2011 – present

Related
- ITV News; Peston; Tonight

Exposure is a current affairs strand, broadcast in the United Kingdom on the ITV network. The programme comprises long-form films, investigating and exploring domestic and foreign topics. Episodes are produced both by independent production companies and in-house by ITV Studios. The average budget for a single edition is between £150,000 and £200,000.

The series was commissioned by Peter Fincham, ITV's Director of Television, and is a sister show to year-round current affairs strand Tonight. It made its debut on Monday 26 September 2011 – airing at 22.40, directly after ITV News at Ten. Since its launch, the programme has usually occupied this near-peak slot, but has also been shown as late as 23.10. On 3 March 2015, it made its only appearance to date in primetime, airing at 21.00.

The series was broadcast on Mondays in 2011 and Wednesdays in 2012. The 2013 series was billed as an eight-episode run (the longest to date), with five of the editions airing on consecutive Thursdays in their traditional autumn slots and the remaining three being broadcast as standalone episodes between February and July 2014.

In January 2014 it was announced that ITV would no longer air episodes in a series block, instead spreading them throughout the year. Independent producers expressed concern that this would result in fewer editions, but ITV said the changes allowed for a more flexible approach regarding delivery deadlines, which are often complicated by the need for legal clearance before broadcast.

The three standalone editions aired in early-mid 2014 as part of series 3 from 2013 effectively meant that there was no 2014 series of the strand. The programme began its first non-series run in January 2015.

Promotional trailers for individual editions are rare, but the strand itself featured in a promo for ITV's news and current affairs coverage (along with ITV News, Tonight and The Agenda) in late 2012.

== Episodes ==
=== Series 1 (2011) ===
No. overall	No. in season	Title	Original release date
1	1	"Gaddafi and the IRA"	26 September 2011
Colonel Gaddafi gave the IRA enough weapons to turn a militia into an army. Exposure's first film examines his support for the Republicans and investigates the continuing danger of his legacy. Narrated by Paul McGann. In this episode, ITV mistakenly presented footage taken from the game ArmA 2 as footage of a 1988 IRA attack. The broadcaster apologised, blaming human error. A spokesperson for ITV commented on the error and said: "The events featured in Exposure: Gaddafi and the IRA were genuine but it would appear that during the editing process the correct clip of the 1988 incident was not selected and other footage was mistakenly included in the film by producers. This was an unfortunate case of human error for which we apologise."
2	2	"The Factory"	TBA
Focusing on a city in Europe where the pollution is so bad, children struggle to breathe, DNA is damaged, and the vulnerable are forced indoors. This programme investigates the role played by a global multi-national.
3	3	"Heart Hospital"	TBA
This featured heart patients and follow them on their life journeys- narrated by Victoria Chalet
4	4	"The World's Deadliest Arms Race"	TBA
5	5	"On the Run"	TBA
Mark Williams-Thomas investigates
6	6	"Heart Hospital"	TBA

=== Series 2 (2012) ===
No. overall	No. in season	Title	Original release date
7	1	"The British Way of Death"	26 September 2012
Undercover investigation which reveals disrespectful behaviour by British funeral directors.
8	2	"The Other Side of Jimmy Savile"	3 October 2012
Former police officer Mark Williams-Thomas investigates sexual abuse of underage girls by Jimmy Savile. Five women (two of whom waived their right to anonymity) all state that they were assaulted or raped by Savile. The programme was born out of an aborted investigation by the BBC's Newsnight in late 2011, on which Williams-Thomas had worked as a consultant, with reporter Liz MacKean and producer Meirion Jones. Williams-Thomas took a leading role in the programme, having pitched a proposal to ITV after the BBC dropped the Newsnight investigation; he has praised MacKean and Jones for allowing him to do so. He says he researched the piece as if he were running a police investigation and admits that he was worried that both he and the programme-makers would be heavily criticised if other victims hadn't come forward in the wake of the broadcast. The piece came within the usual budget for Exposure, costing around £170,000 for the ten-month investigation. It was broadcast in a later-than-usual timeslot of 23.15, but still attracted 2.5 million viewers (including time-shifted viewing) and a 23% audience share. The edition won Royal Television Society awards in 2013 in the Current Affairs (Home) and Scoop of the Year categories. It was also given a Peabody Award in 2012. The programme gave ITV News a platform for extensive follow-up reports on the subject, which resulted in ITN winning the News Coverage (Home) category in the RTS awards in 2013. Although it would become the highest profile edition of the programme to date, this episode was broadcast at the later-than-usual time of 23.10.
9	3	"No bribes please! We're British"	10 October 2012
10	4	"Driven From Home"	17 October 2012
Residents forced out of an estate blighted by violence
11	5	"Who cares in Britain's care homes?"	24 October 2012
12	6	"Banaz: An Honour Killing"	31 October 2012
The story of Banaz Mahmod, who was 19 years old when she became the victim of a honour killing ordered by her own family. The programme features footage from a police interview with Banaz, who says she is being followed by members of the Kurdish community from which she originates, having walked out on an abusive forced marriage and pursued a relationship with another man. The programme is a shorter version of the film Banaz: A Love Story, produced by Fuuse Films created in collaboration with Hardcash Productions for Exposure. Banaz won a Peabody Award and International Emmy Award in 2013, but lost out to another Exposure film, The Other Side of Jimmy Savile, at the Royal Television Society Journalism Awards in 2013. In view of the programme's content, a warning about "graphic discussion of rape and murder" was aired in the continuity announcement at the start of this edition; unusually, this warning was repeated after the first commercial break before the programme continued.
13	7	"Exposure Update: The Jimmy Savile Investigation"	21 November 2012
Mark Williams-Thomas revisits his investigation into Jimmy Savile, which dominated the news in the weeks after it was broadcast. Set against a backdrop of the criminal and institutional investigations which had been launched in the intervening seven weeks, this programme features testimony from more victims and explores how Savile ingratiated himself with politicians and royalty. It also considers the question of how Savile was able to gain widespread access and power within NHS institutions, in spite of being unqualified for any of the roles which he purportedly fulfilled there. The programme considers why charges were not brought against Savile after he was interviewed by Surrey Police in 2009; Williams-Thomas declares "for the record" during this segment of the programme that he used to work for the force.

=== Series 3 (2013) ===
No. overall	No. in season	Title	Original release date
14	1	"Predators Abroad"	2 October 2013
Mark Williams-Thomas investigates new concerns over British paedophiles in Cambodia.
15	2	"Forced to Marry"	9 October 2013
UK imams agree to perform underage marriages.
16	3	"Britain's booming cannabis business"	16 October 2013
Conor Woodman investigates the shift in the UK cannabis industry from commercial to home-grown production and reveals how this move towards small domestic units can result in growers encountering the kind of violent criminals whom they had tried to avoid by growing their own supply. The programme explores the extent of cannabis cultivation in the UK and shows how major dealers are generating their profits by operating multiple small-scale sites.
17	4	"Undercover Colleges"	23 October 2013
An undercover investigation into the recruiting practices, administration and facilities at the Academy de London and London School of Business and Finance
18	5	"Too Late to Save Your Life"	30 October 2013
An investigation into the effectiveness of the UK's cancer screening programme, exploring how some testing regimes have better early diagnosis and detection rates than others.
19	6	"Fashion Factories Undercover"	6 February 2014
An investigation uncovers pressures, abuse and violence - as well as locked fire doors and lies about health and safety - behind the closed doors of Dhaka's sweatshops. Presented by Laura Kuenssberg, who had provided extensive coverage in the aftermath of the Rana Plaza factory disaster in April 2013 as ITV News Business Editor. This programme was broadcast shortly after Kuenssberg had departed ITN to rejoin the BBC, but she made appearances on ITV News bulletins throughout the day, trailing the edition. It was the first standalone edition in what had been billed as an eight-episode run when the series returned in autumn 2013. This edition was produced by Hardcash Productions.
20	7	"Inside the Diplomatic Bag"	26 April 2014
Mark Williams-Thomas investigates how privileges for foreign diplomats based in the UK are open to abuse. Issues explored include diplomatic immunity and the protected status of the so-called 'diplomatic bag' for moving items into and out of the country. The programme centres around a sting on a member of the Nigerian High Commission, who claims he can smuggle stolen goods out of the UK, but is later revealed not to have diplomatic status.
21	8	"Don't Take My Child"	15 July 2014
Exploring the issue of forced adoption and considering whether the power is being used too readily in the wake of several high-profile child protection scandals. Narrated by ITV News presenter Nina Hossain. Another standalone edition; the last episode in the 2013/14 series.

=== Occasional episodes ===
No. overall	No. in season	Title	Original release date
TBA	TBA	"Britain's Secret Slaves"	22 January 2015
ITV News presenter Julie Etchingham fronts an investigation into forced domestic servitude. The programme includes interviews with those who have experienced modern-day slavery after being brought to the UK. It also considers how changes to visa rules, designed to toughen the immigration system, could be responsible for trapping victims in slave-like conditions and features an undercover sting on a recruitment agency which promises non-existent jobs to foreign domestic workers in return for a fee. The culmination of the sting sees a producer on the programme confront the woman who had been secretly filmed. The lack of pictures resulting from the need to obscure identities and provide an appropriate visual accompaniment to disturbing cases studies is addressed with the use of still drawings of the situations under discussion. This edition was produced by Hardcash Productions.
TBA	TBA	"The Kill List"	11 February 2015
This edition reveals how real-time information from mobile phones was used by coalition forces to target suspected insurgents during conflicts in Iraq and Afghanistan. At the height of the military action, up to a dozen addresses were raided per night in an effort to capture or kill the individuals concerned. Some senior military figures involved in the operations defend their use and effectiveness, while other analysts suggest they hampered efforts to negotiate an end to the conflicts - perhaps even improving the gene pool of insurgent fighters, making them more difficult to defeat militarily. The programme is narrated by former Parachute Regiment commander Sean Rayment and produced by Brook Lapping Productions.
TBA	TBA	"Charities Behaving Badly"	18 February 2015
An investigation into charities alleged to be promoting extremist views, including white supremacy, anti-semitism and jihad. ITV News presenter Mark Austin presents and also conducts several interviews, including one in which the Charities Commission admits it does not have the power to close charities for the reasons highlighted by the programme.
TBA	TBA	"When Pregnant Women Drink"	3 March 2015
This edition explores a condition known as Foetal Alcohol Spectrum Disorder, which can affect the offspring of women who consume alcohol during pregnancy. It focuses on the apparently contradictory advice given to pregnant women in the UK about a 'safe level' of alcohol intake. The programme features several sufferers of FASD and follows the progress of one child with severe behavioural and developmental problems whose adoptive parents are seeking a definitive diagnosis. They are given access to advanced facial profiling techniques which aid in confirming the condition. Research is revealed from the United States which claims an analysis of various studies shows alcohol to be a greater risk factor to unborn babies than heroin. Good Morning Britain and ITV News presenter Ranvir Singh presents and takes on an active reporter role, conducting the majority of interviews, including a combative encounter with a consultant obstetrician. This edition aired in peak time at 21.00, the only occasion to date on which the strand has done so. It was produced by October Films.
TBA	TBA	"Jihad: A British Story"	15 June 2015
An investigation into Islamic extremism in the UK, featuring interviews with reformed extremists. The film is made by Deeyah Khan and produced by her production company Fuuse.
TBA	TBA	"The Sham Marriage Racket: How to Buy Your Way into Britain"	2 July 2015
An undercover reporter investigates the rise in sham marriages, passport forging, and human trafficking.
TBA	TBA	"NHS Out of Hours Undercover"	22 July 2015
ITV News presenter Mark Austin looks into the failures of patient care at an NHS Out of Hours service in London, discovering unqualified doctors and understaffing.
TBA	TBA	"Making the Grades"	12 August 2015
ITV News presenter Julie Etchingham investigates the increasing pressure on schools in the UK to deliver good grades from their students, leading to teachers dishonestly marking exam papers higher than they should be. It is produced by Hardcash Productions.
TBA	TBA	"Saudi Arabia Uncovered"	22 March 2016
An investigation into the strict Islamist regimes of Saudi Arabia, featuring covertly-shot footage and interviews with a number of activists.
TBA	TBA	"Abused and Betrayed - A Life Sentence"	15 June 2016
An investigation into the allegations that Clement Freud, a former member of parliament for North East Cambridgeshire, had abused two girls in the 1940s and 1970s. Presented by ITV News presenter Julie Etchingham.
TBA	TBA	"Islam's Non-Believers"	13 October 2016
A documentary about the lives and experiences of ex-Muslims: people who have left Islam to become atheists, and who often face discrimination, harassment, ostracism and violence for leaving Islam, both in the UK and abroad. The film is made by Deeyah Khan and produced by her production company Fuuse.
TBA	TBA	"Breaking the Silence: Britain's Adoption Scandal"	9 November 2016
Documentary revealing the stories of thousands of women who were pressured to give up their children for adoption following World War II.
TBA	TBA	"Undercover: Life and Death in a Homeless Hostel"	10 November 2016
An undercover investigation into hostels in the UK and the way that homeless and vulnerable people are treated there.
TBA	TBA	"Hillsborough: Smears, Survivors & the Search for Truth"	12 December 2016
A documentary uncovering previously unreported specific evidence that raises questions over witness statements given in the wake of the Hillsborough disaster. It explores the possibility of an alleged cover-up by the police. Presented by Peter Marshall.
TBA	TBA	"Undercover: Inside Britain's New Far Right"	9 November 2017
An undercover investigation into far-right extremist groups in Britain, including scrutiny of the UK Independence Party and questions about the extreme views of a contender to become their leader, Anne Marie Waters.
TBA	TBA	"White Right: Meeting the Enemy"	11 December 2017
Deeyah Khan travels to America to meet with some of the most prominent neo-Nazis and white supremacist leaders in the US today to seek to understand the personal and political reasons behind the apparent resurgence of extremism in the US.
TBA	TBA	"Who Cares? Children's Homes Undercover"	13 December 2017
A covertly filmed investigation into children's homes, showing evidence of understaffing and lack of training.
TBA	TBA	"Prisons Uncovered: Out of Control?"	11 June 2018
An investigation into the state of prisons in the UK, showcasing an extensive look into a riot that happened in December 2016 at HM Prison Birmingham, which became Britain's worst prison riot in 25 years.
TBA	TBA	"The Hunt for the Birmingham Bombers"	1 October 2018
An investigation into the Birmingham pub bombings that occurred in 1974, revealing the identities of the prime suspects involved and confronting one of them, Michael Patrick Reilly, about their possible involvement in the bombings. Presented by John Ware.
TBA	TBA	"Iran Unveiled: Taking on the Ayatollahs"	29 October 2018
A documentary following the stories of four women who are challenging those who have ruled Iran for 40 years and defying the ayatollahs. Inspiration for the film came when a woman removed her headscarf on one of the busiest streets in Tehran, the capital of Iran.
TBA	TBA	"Brexit Online Uncovered"	4 March 2019
An investigative documentary into the rise of trolls and online abuse directed towards Members of Parliament on social media following the 2016 United Kingdom European Union membership referendum. It features interviews with several MPs, including Conservative MP Nicky Morgan and independent MP Anna Soubry, both of whom have been targeted because of their views towards having a "soft" Brexit or remaining in the European Union.
TBA	TBA	"Undercover: Inside China's Digital Gulag"	15 July 2019
Directed by Robin Barnwell
TBA	TBA	"Falklands: Island of Secrets"	24 April 2022
Marcel Theroux, Directed by Jon Blair
