= Behind the Rage: America's Domestic Violence =

2022 British documentary

- Genre: Documentary
- Directed by: Deeyah Khan
- Theme music composer: Nick Kingsley; Danny Farrant
- Country of origin: United Kingdom
- Original language: English

Production
- Producers: Darin Prindle; Andrew Smith
- Cinematography: Darin Prindle; Andy Jackson; Deeyah Khan
- Editor: Michael Ho
- Running time: 70 minutes
- Production company: Fuuse Film

Original release
- Network: ITV
- Release: 17 October 2022

Behind the Rage: America’s Domestic Violence is the seventh film by documentary film director Deeyah Khan's for ITV Exposure. This documentary has testimonies from survivors of domestic violence and victims’ families, and brings insights from social workers and psychologists who work with male perpetrators of domestic violence. The majority of the documentary focuses on those whose voices are rarely heard in conversations about domestic, the perpetrators themselves.

The documentary received its premiere in the UK on ITV on October 17, 2022. The film has received five star review from The Times.

" There are many documentaries who seek out dangerous and inaccessible environments to convey something raw and mind-boggling. It has almost become a genre of its own. But no one does it exactly like Norwegian-British Deeyah Khan. She is up there in a class of her own, close to Louis Theroux and Errol Morris. "
Kjetil Lismoen, Aftenposten

== Cast ==
- Leslie Morgan Steiner
- Dr. David Adams (Emerge: Perpetrator education program)
- Dorthy Stucky Halley (Family Peace Initiative)
- Dr. Sara Brammer (Synergy Services)
- Dr. Jackson Katz
- Angela Gabriel
