= America's Veterans: The War Within =

- Genre: Documentary
- Directed by: Deeyah Khan
- Theme music composer: Nick Kingsley
- Country of origin: United Kingdom
- Original language: English

Production
- Producers: Darin Prindle; Andrew Smith
- Cinematography: Deeyah Khan; Darin Prindle
- Editors: Nigel Timperley; Michael Ho; George Reynolds
- Running time: 68 minutes
- Production company: Fuuse Film

Original release
- Network: ITV
- Release: 15 June 2025

America’s Veterans: The War Within is a 2025 British documentary film directed by Deeyah Khan. The film explores the psychological and emotional impact of military service on U.S. veterans of the post-9/11 conflicts in Iraq and Afghanistan. Through a series of in-depth interviews, the documentary examines the experiences of American veterans dealing with trauma, moral injury, and the challenges of reintegration into civilian life.

"This moving, bruising documentary makes a key point about the so called war on terror: it did'nt just devastate Iraq and Afghanistan, it devastated those who fought it."
Caroline Frost, Radio Times

Filmed across several states in the United States, the documentary presents personal accounts of combat, including participation in and witness to violence, and discusses the lasting effects of those experiences. The film also features dialogue between U.S. veterans and Iraqi civilians, offering contrasting perspectives on the consequences of war for individuals on both sides. It highlights efforts by veterans to seek healing and reconciliation, and explores the broader societal implications of America’s recent military engagements.

America's Veterans: The War Within premiered on ITV and ITVX in the United Kingdom on June 15, 2025. It was produced by Fuuse.
