= Simon Topping =

British activist

Simon Topping is a Methodist minister and faith leader based in Hucclecote in Gloucester, England, known for his campaign work in favour of ending world poverty.

== Background ==
Reverend Doctor Simon Topping came to prominence during his time in Birmingham and his work on the British chapter of the Jubilee 2000 Drop the Debt campaign. In 1998 he helped to initiate a human chain around central Birmingham during the G8 meeting of world leaders in the city. The campaign resulted in the relocation of the G8 conference meeting to the outskirts of the Midlands. In 2003 he co-founded the Saltley Gate Peace Group, an inter-faith initiative, launched in response to the build-up to war in Iraq.

== Drop the Debt ==
In 2001 Topping caused controversy when he designed a black poppy to 'highlight the problems of world poverty'. Members of the Royal British Legion were allegedly angered by the use of the poppy due to its connotations with Remembrance Day. The minister continued to campaign for the cause right through to Make Poverty History.

== Make Poverty History ==
In 2005, when the World G8 Summit returned to the United Kingdom, the international Make Poverty History campaign was climaxing with marches in Scotland and Live 8 in London. In support of the campaign Rev. Topping organised and took part in a 400-mile trek from Birmingham to Edinburgh.
