= Banaz: A Love Story =

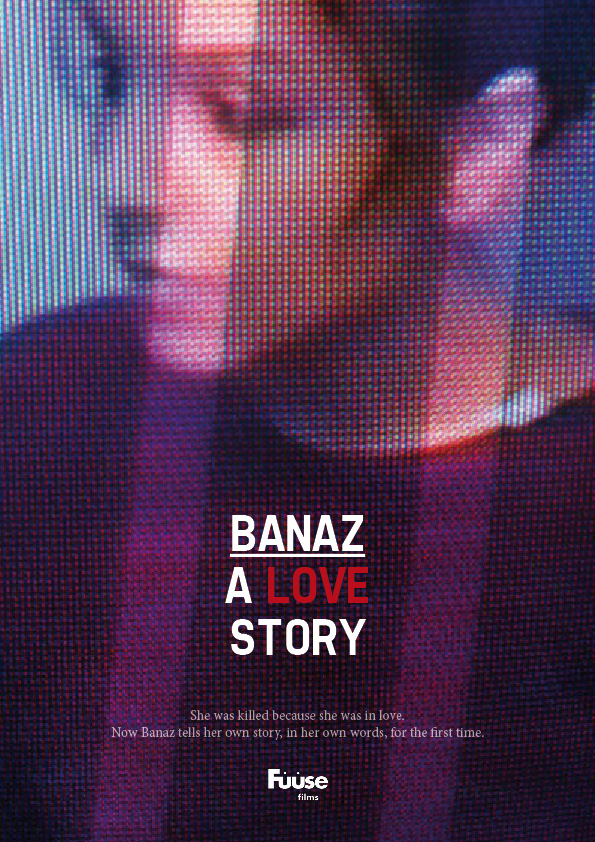
- Directed by: Deeyah Khan
- Starring: Banaz Mahmod; Bekhal Mahmod; Caroline Goode; Diana Nammi; Nazir Afzal; Palbinder Singh; Victor Temple; Bobbie Cheema; Joanne Payton; Andy Craig; Stuart Reeves
- Theme music composer: L. Subramaniam
- Countries of origin: United Kingdom; Norway
- Original language: English

Production
- Producer: Deeyah
- Cinematography: Jeremiah Chapman
- Running time: 70 minutes

Original release
- Release: 29 September 2012

Banaz: A Love Story is a 2012 documentary film directed and produced by Deeyah Khan. The film chronicles the life and death of Banaz Mahmod, a young British-Iraqi woman of Kurdish origin killed in 2006 in South London on the orders of her family in what is euphemistically called honour killing. The film received its UK premiere at the Raindance Film Festival in London September 2012.

== Synopsis ==
Banaz Mahmoud was born in Iraqi Kurdistan and moved to England with her family when she was 10 years old. At the age of 17, her parents had arranged a marriage between her and a man 10 years older than her. Within months the marriage turned violent and Banaz requested a divorce. In the coming months, Banaz fell in love with someone of her own choosing, something which was found to be shameful by her family. Banaz was kept in confinement by her family, beaten, and forbidden to see her lover. She escaped and sought help from authorities, to no avail. She wrote a letter to police, detailing her situation and stating that her father should be investigated if anything were to happen to her. In January 2006, Banaz was killed by family members, in a plot which was initiated by her father. In total, Banaz went to the police 5 times before her death, but did not get the help she needed. Detective Chief Inspector Caroline Goode of the Metropolitan Police led the investigation to recover the body of Banaz and arrest her killers, securing the first ever extradition from Iraq to Britain.

"…. a completely shocking, revealing, and timely insight into the scourge of 'honour killing'. … quite literally a horror movie tracking the brutal and agonising life, love, and death of Banaz Mahmod who is terrorised and ultimately put to death by the very people who should have loved her most – her family."
Jon Snow, Channel 4

"…Like watching a car-crash in slow motion the amount of information dredged up in BANAZ: A LOVE STORY suffocates you. You know the outcome, yet here you are taking it all in wondering why the hell nobody was able to stop it from happening......This gradual drip-drip of information leading to tragedy feels much like Dreams of a Life, the account of how Joyce Vincent dropped out of society to die alone in 2003.”
David Perilli

"If their own blood relatives discarded, betrayed, forgot and harmed them, then they are our children, our sisters our mothers that we will mourn, we will remember, we will honour their memory and we will not forget!"
Deeyah talked to Safeworld about her reason for making the film.

== Film screenings ==
Banaz: A Love Story has been re-versioned for ITV's UK investigative journalism series Exposure, for UK national broadcast on 31 October in co-production with Hardcash Productions and Fuuse Films. The re-versioned film for ITV Exposure is named: BANAZ – AN HONOUR KILLING.

Further screenings of Banaz A Love Story:

- Eurodok Film Festival
- Women's International Film & Arts Festival 2013 (Miami)
- The Home Office film screening UK 2012
- Glasgow Film Festival 2013
- Bergen International Film Festival 2013
- WATCH DOCS. Human Rights in Film IFF November 2013 Poland
- House of Lords screening United Kingdom December 2013
- Swedish Parliament screening January 2014
- De Balie Amsterdam Feb 2014
- OUR LIVES...TO LIVE FILM FESTIVAL India Feb 2014
- Chulalongkorn University Thailand March 2014
- International Film Festival and Forum on Human Rights | 8 March 2014
- United Nations Human Rights Council Geneva 10 March 2014
- UN New York 6 May 2014

== Accolades ==
Year	Award	Category	Result
2013	Peabody Award	International TV Documentary	Won
2013	Emmy	Best International Current Affairs	Won
2013	Bergen International Film Festival	Best Norwegian Documentary	Won
2011-2012	Royal Television Society	Journalism award for Home/British Current Affairs	Nominated

== HBVA and Memini ==
During the making of the film, Deeyah worked with experts, activists and NGOs (Non-Government Organizations) specialising in the field of honour-based violence globally, which led to a shared recognition of the urgent need for online educational resources and campaigning networks dedicated to the issue.

As a result, the making of Banaz: A Love Story led to Deeyah founding two independent initiatives:

- HBVA (Honour Based Violence Awareness Network), an international digital resource centre working to advance awareness through research, documentation, information and training for professionals who may encounter women, girls and men at risk, building partnerships with experts, activists, and NGOs from around the world.
- Memini, an online memorial to victims of honour killing. Memini exists to acknowledge the lives and deaths of thousands who are killed in the ongoing massacre of 'honour' killing. "We seek to create a community of remembrance to end the silence, honour the dead and keep their memories alive, collecting and preserving the stories of women like Banaz, as well as celebrating their strength and courage."

== See also ==
- Namus
