= Gaza: Doctors Under Attack =

2025 documentary

- Directed by: Karim Shah
- Produced by: Robert Macqueen; Jaber Badwan; Osama Al-Ashi
- Edited by: Melanie Quigley; Andy Kemp
- Production company: Basement Films
- Distributed by: Channel 4
- Release date: 2 July 2025 (United Kingdom)
- Country: United Kingdom
- Language: English

Gaza: Doctors Under Attack is a 2025 British documentary film directed by Karim Shah. The film examines doctors and healthcare workers during the Gaza war, including the killing and alleged torture of healthcare workers and attacks on hospitals by the Israel Defense Forces.

Originally commissioned by the BBC under the title Gaza: Medics Under Fire, the documentary was dropped by the broadcaster following an internal review. It was later picked up by Channel 4, which aired it in July 2025.

The film received positive reviews, with The Guardian naming it one of the 50 best television shows of 2025. At the 2026 British Academy Television Awards, it won the Best Current Affairs award.

== Release ==
Originally due to be broadcast in February 2025 by the BBC and cleared for broadcast, the film underwent an internal review by the BBC due to alleged politically sensitive material. Over 600 prominent figures signed an open letter calling the delay "political suppression" and demanding the release of the film.

In June 2025, the BBC announced that it would not air the documentary because of what it described as impartiality concerns, and announced it would instead transfer ownership of the film to its producers, Basement Films, allowing it to be released.

On 28 June 2025, it was announced that Channel 4 would air the documentary on 2 July 2025. The film was released globally on the same day by Zeteo.

Days later, The Daily Telegraph wrote that the film's co-producer Osama Al-Ashi publicly celebrated the October 7 massacre of Israelis.

== Reception ==
Stuart Heritage of The Guardian wrote that the film is a "work that demands to be seen." The newspaper ranked it as one of the 50 best TV shows of 2025, describing it as "an essential document of our times".

=== Accolades ===
At the 2026 British Academy Television Awards, Gaza: Doctors Under Attack won the Best Current Affairs award. During the acceptance speech, executive producer Ben de Pear criticised the BBC for dropping the documentary before its later broadcast by Channel 4.

| Award | Date of ceremony | Category | Recipient(s) | Result | Ref. |
|---|---|---|---|---|---|
| British Academy Television Awards | 10 May 2026 | Best Current Affairs | Gaza: Doctors Under Attack | Won | |

== See also ==
- Gaza: How to Survive a Warzone
