= Muslim in Trump's America =

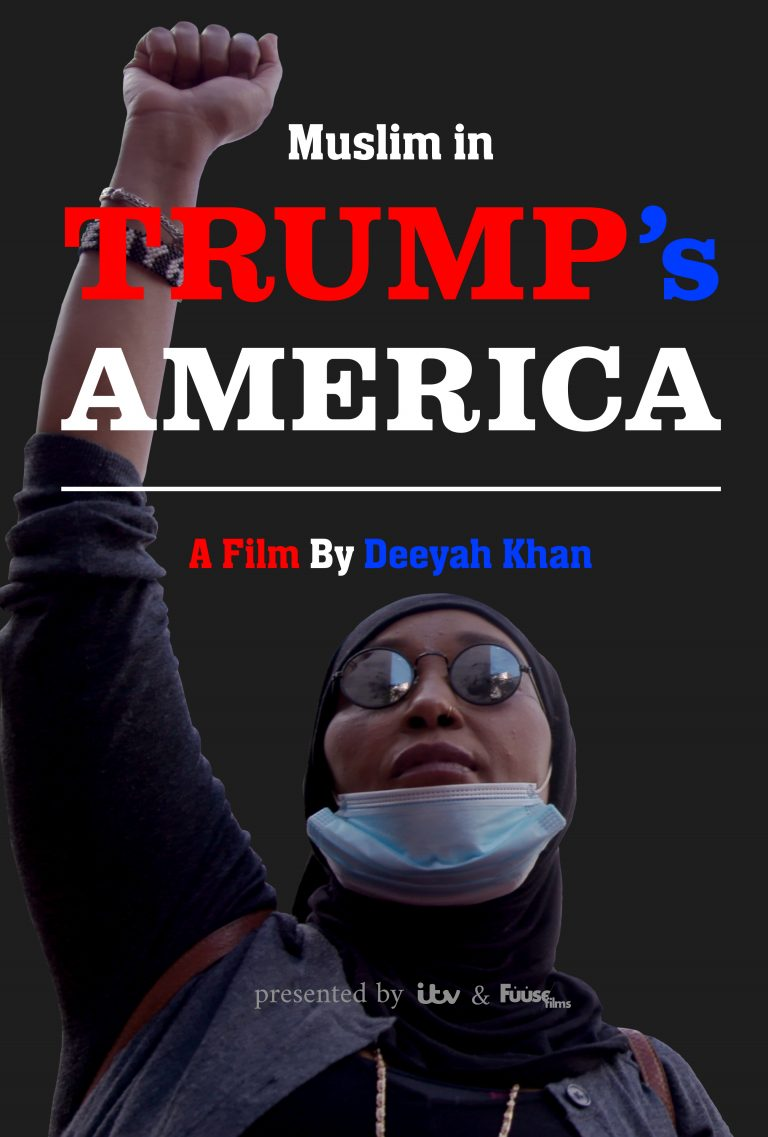
- Muslim In Trump’s America
- Genre: Documentary
- Directed by: Deeyah Khan
- Theme music composer: Nick Kingsley; Danny Farrant
- Country of origin: United Kingdom
- Original language: English

Production
- Producers: Darin Prindle; Andrew Smith
- Cinematography: Deeyah Khan; Darin Prindle
- Editor: Michael Ho
- Running time: 63 minutes
- Production company: Fuuse Film

Original release
- Network: ITV
- Release: 1 November 2020

Muslim In Trump’s America is a 2020 current affairs documentary film produced for ITV's Exposure strand. The film had its British premiere on 1 November 2020, and Norwegian Premier on NRK 2 on 2 November.

In this documentary, director Deeyah Khan investigates the impact of rising anti-Muslim hate groups, conspiracy theories and hate crimes since 2015. Khan meets the family of a Kansas farmer serving 30 years for an anti-Muslim bomb plot; she films with a right wing, armed militia who believe that Muslims are trying to take over America; and she meets ordinary Muslims whose lives have been shattered by violence and intolerance. Deeyah also meets the campaigners who are trying to combat a rising tide of hatred; and seeks to get to the heart of the Muslim experience in America; experiences of alienation, of rejection, and the daily struggles of keeping faith with both Islam and the American Dream.

Muslim In Trump’s America has won a Peabody Award in News category.

== Cast ==
- Ilhan Omar
- Rais Bhuiyan
- Baktash Ahadi
- Hattie Stein
- Chris Hill
- Ken Stein
- Nichole Clinger
- Alicia Berzins
- Michael Boggus
- Imam Mohammed Omar
- Wajahat Ali
- Ronald Haddad
- Fardousa Jama
- Asma Jama
- Keith Ellison
