= Nordic Woman =

2012 compilation album by various artists

Studio album by Various artists
- Released: March 2012 (Scandinavia); September 2012 (UK)
- Genre: World
- Label: Grappa Music, Fuuse Mousiqi
- Producer: Deeyah Khan

Nordic Woman is a compilation album that features traditional music forms performed by well known female artists in Nordic countries.

Nordic Woman was released worldwide in 2012. The album is the first release from WOMAN which is an album series created and produced by Norwegian composer and producer Deeyah Khan to spotlight women's voices and the indigenous and traditional music from different parts of the world.

Each album in the WOMAN series is created to draw attention to women's position within various societies today highlighting the accomplishments as well as remaining struggles and barriers women face.

== Track listing ==
No.	Title	Performer	Country	Length
1.	"Januses manad"	Frifot/Lena Willemark	Sweden	1:52
2.	"Gulan Du"	Mari Boine	Norway	4:36
3.	"Lilja"	Bára Grímsdóttir	Iceland	3:40
4.	"Å gjev du batt meg"	Tuva Livsdatter Syvertsen (Valkyrien Allstars)	Norway	3:02
5.	"Raudan synty"	Suden Aika	Finland	4:41
6.	"Krummi"	Valravn	Denmark	4:02
7.	"Vind, kom"	Unni Løvlid	Norway	3:43
8.	"Besta syng barneviser"	Kirsten Bråten Berg	Norway	2:06
9.	"Suvvi ljat"	Adjágas	Norway	4:40
10.	"Og þótt enginn gráti"	Ragga Gröndal & The Icelandic Folk Ensemble	Iceland	3:07
11.	"Fønix"	Annbjørg Lien	Norway	4:07
12.	"Hvor du vender dig"	Phønix	Denmark	2:32
13.	"Mieli miehelle"	MeNaiset	Finland	5:00
14.	"Euchari (Hildegard von Bingen version)"	Garmarna	Sweden	5:00
15.	"Sofi, sofi barnið"	Heiða Árnadóttir	Iceland	2:36
16.	"Mieltäni meri ajaa"	SUO	Finland	6:17
17.	"Brinna Inga Hjärtan"	Ranarim	Sweden	3:52
18.	"Svevende · jord"	Tone Hulbækmo	Norway	5:25
