= Trump Takes on the World =

2021 BBC Two documentary series

Trump Takes on the World is a 2021 documentary series about the foreign policy of the President of the United States, Donald Trump. The series was produced by Brook Lapping and broadcast on BBC Two.

== Synopsis ==
The three-part series focuses on Trump's foreign policy regarding Europe, the Middle East, and East Asia. It includes interviews with members of the administration including Thomas Shannon and K. T. McFarland, as well as foreign leaders such as prime minister of Australia Malcolm Turnbull and President of France François Hollande.

== Reception ==
Anita Singh of The Daily Telegraph rated the series four stars out of five. Ed Cumming of The Independent gave it five stars out of five, praising the quality of the interviewees; Alison Howatt of The Herald believed that the interviewees illuminated incidents that would be well known to viewers. Commentator Iain Dale considered the series to be factual and not agenda-driven.

The series was nominated for the Best Current Affairs at the 2022 British Academy Television Awards.
