= Khalid Yasin =

American Islamic preacher (born 1946)

- Yasin speaks on evolution in a public lecture.
- Born: 1946 (age 79–80); Harlem, New York, United States
- Other names: Abu Muhammad, Abu Muhammad Khalid Yasin
- Occupations: Islamic Preacher; Scholar; Speaker

YouTube information
- Channel: Shaykh Khalid Yasin
- Years active: 2011–present
- Subscribers: 30,800
- Views: 846,807
- Last updated: 8 November 2026
- Website: khalidyasin.com

Khalid Yasin (born 1946) is an American Islamic preacher, a former Christian, who lives in Manchester, England and lectures in the United Kingdom and other parts of the world. Yasin frequently travels overseas to spread his faith and has called himself a "media-bedouin," remarking that the bedouins are willing to settle wherever there is "water and shelter".

== Background ==
Yasin was born in Harlem, New York and raised in Brooklyn as a Christian along with nine siblings. Although not an orphan, he was put up for adoption due to his family's financial state. He grew up in foster homes from the age of three along with some of his siblings, until he was fifteen. He describes each foster home as having a different Christian denomination, so he covered a wide spectrum of Christianity.

Yasin has described his youth in "the ghetto", where it was "Me and my two brothers Sam and Julius, against the world. We had nothing but reverting and accepting Islam now we have everything". Yasin felt the grief of African-American people, and he was especially influenced by the turbulent 1960s and figures like Malcolm X.

Yasin converted to Islam in 1965. He began his ministry as the "Amir" or leader of Jammat Ita'hadul Iqwa on Eastern Parkway in Brooklyn.

Yasin has been accused of espousing a radical form of Islam. Channel Nine in Australia described him as "a charismatic preacher who’s capturing the hearts and minds of young Australian Muslims with a radical mix of pleas for the understanding of terrorism, anti-Western conspiracy theories and radical homophobia. Rather differently, the Oman Tribune described him as a "learned scholar" who "regularly tours different countries debunking the misinformation about Islam".

Discussing his leisure time, Yasin said, "I’m a fairly avid horseman, I swim, I box, I read quite a bit. Probably once every two years I visit Mecca and I cleanse myself spiritually by performing the Umrah or the Hajj, and then daily I pray five times a day. As a Muslim that gives me the refreshment and our Muhammad peace and blessings be upon him, said that the prayer is the coolness of his eyes. So I have the opportunity to recede five times a day into that inner sanctum."

Yasin has operated dawah organizations under various names, including Islamic Broadcasting Corporation Ltd which was dissolved in 2010.

=== Notable views ===
In a speech that Yasin delivered at Bankstown Town Hall in Sydney, Australia, as well as in a televised interview, seen as critical of Muslims befriending non-Muslims, Yasin said: "There's no such thing as a Muslim having a non-Muslim friend, so a non-Muslim could be your associate but they can't be a friend. They're not your friend because they don't understand your religious principles and they cannot because they don't understand your faith." He later contextualized his comment, explaining that Muslim people, including him, invariably have friends, neighbors and colleagues who are non-Muslims, but that does not mean that non-Muslims should influence Muslims' religious or moral decisions.

Yasin has lectured to students at universities as a guest speaker and on debate panels. He also addresses crowds at events aimed at young people. Yasin has made statements describing western civilization's academic tradition as difficult to reconcile with Islamic religious life: "University is a gateway for deviation, you forget your Islamic direction. Now you have become compromised through some kind of intellectuality."

Yasin was allegedly quoted by an Australian newspaper instructing a light beating as discipline for disobedient wives. Yasin denies ever saying this, and says that the Koran does not include any such instructions in its 6236 verses.

In Australia in 2005 Yasin was quoted as saying that: "The Koran gives a clear position regarding homosexuality lesbianism and bestiality. ... They are aberrations punishable by death. ... We can’t walk around society slandering them because there is legislation against doing that but we don’t have to like them we don’t have to promote them and we have the right to say that that’s a moral aberration.” In a 2010 documentary, Yasin said that "in the eyes of God everyone is equal, not the same, but equal" and that, "according to the principles of Islam", homosexuality is "a perversive behavior and a criminal behavior. But we need to be tolerant. We are citizens, we need to be tolerant".

Yasin believes that HIV, the virus that causes AIDS, is probably man-made and that the US government is the likely culprit. He said that “missionaries from the World Health Organization and Christian groups ... went into Africa and inoculated people for diphtheria, malaria, yellow fever and they put in the medicine the AIDS virus.”

Yasin accuses Israel of state terrorism. He refers to "an occupation of Palestinian land by the criminal state of Israel ... and they are still committing terrorism after 50 years".

Regarding capital punishment by some Muslim states, Yasin has said: "Then people can see, people without hands, people can see in public heads rolling down the street, people got [sic] their hands and feet from opposite sides chopped off and they see them crucified ... They see people put up against the pole and see them get lashed in public. They see it, and because they see it, it acts as a deterrent for them because they say I don't want that to happen to me". Yasin made these comments during an investigation for a British Channel 4 documentary, "Dispatches: Undercover Mosque", which investigated the intolerance and fundamentalism reportedly being spreading through Britain's mosques from the Saudi Arabian religious establishment closely linked to the Saudi Arabian government. Yasin responded that his comments should be considered in context and that he did not support or promote Saudi Arabian government religious rhetoric and that, in any event, capital punishment occurred in many countries. "The lecture," he stated, "was aimed at reforming the Muslim people, the Muslim society and the Muslim world … to be adjudicated by the Sovereign Islamic State" when one exists.

On September 7, 2003 Yasin appeared on Australian radio program Sunday Night with John Cleary. Discussing the rarity of international governing bodies within Islam, Cleary asked where Sharia fits into that and Yasin replied: "Well the Sharia is the cement that keeps all the bricks together. The Sharia is the legislative element. The Sharia is the judicial element. This is where rules, this is where juristic decisions, this is where the courts, this is where law is. And I mean if you don't have a people that is governed by Sharia, then you have a lawless people."

=== Denmark ===
In 2010 Yasin lectured in Copenhagen at a Muslim youth project called "North Bronx" - From Gang Member to Conscious Muslim, with one of his credentials being the fact that Yasin is a former gang member from Harlem. His participation stirred political debate whether Yasin was a suitable role model for keeping youths out of gangs. The organizer of the event defended Yasin and stated that, "He has totally changed his position and entered the fight to prevent radicalization and crime". In June 2017 he was banned from entering the Kingdom of Denmark for two years.

=== Netherlands ===
On a Dutch-Muslim feature interview Yasin compared the controversial reaction he and Islam stirs to "someone walking in the dark, without knowing where they are going", and to people being afraid of things they are not familiar with.
