= Undercover Mosque =

2007 documentary programme

Undercover Mosque: "…and he's left there to bleed to death for 3 days"

Undercover Mosque is a documentary programme produced by the British independent television company Hardcash Productions for the Channel 4 series Dispatches that was first broadcast on 15 January 2007 in the UK. The documentary presents video footage gathered from 12 months of secret investigation into mosques throughout Britain. The documentary caused a furore in Britain and the world press due to the extremist content of the released footage. West Midlands Police investigated whether criminal offences had been committed by those teaching or preaching at the Mosques and other establishments.

== Content ==
Undercover Mosque generated controversy because it contained footage of British imams making the following statements:

- Dr. Ijaz Mian on the subject of non-Muslim laws: "You cannot accept the rule of the kaffir…[w]e have to rule ourselves and we have to rule the others."
- Abu Usamah saying of apostates: "If the imam wants to crucify him he should crucify him. The person is put up on the wood and he's left there to bleed to death for three days."
- Abu Usamah speaking on the deficiency of women's minds: "Allah has created the woman, even if she gets a PhD, deficient. Her intellect is incomplete, deficient. She may be suffering from hormones that will make her emotional. It takes two witnesses of a woman to equal the one witness of the man."
- Praises the killer of a British soldier serving in Afghanistan, stating "The hero of Islam is the one who separated his head from his shoulders."
- Abdullah el-Faisal: "You have to bomb the Indian businesses, and as for the Jews you kill them physically."
- Advocates violent Jihad against the non-Muslims and predicting that an army of Muslims will arise against the non-Muslims in England.
- Dr Bilal Philips on marriage with girls before puberty: "The prophet Muhammad practically outlined the rules regarding marriage prior to puberty. With his practice, he clarified what is permissible, and that is why we shouldn't have any issues about an older man marrying a younger woman, which is looked down upon by this society today, but we know that Prophet Mohammed practised it, it wasn’t abuse or exploitation, it was marriage."
- Condemns Muslim integration into British society.
- Calls for the overthrow of the British government and democracy. "[T]hey will fight in the cause of Allah. I encourage all of you to be from amongst them, to begin to cultivate ourselves for the time that is fast approaching where the tables are going to turn and the Muslims are going to be in the position of being uppermost in strength, and when that happens, people won’t get killed – unjustly."
- Dr. Mian: "You are in a situation in which you have to live like a state within a state, until you take over."
- Al Jibali: "By the age of ten, it becomes an obligation on us to force her to wear hijab, and if she doesn’t wear hijab, we hit her."
- Dr. Mian praised the Saudi religious police practice of imprisoning people who do not pray: "They send the police, and they say, well, if you don’t come for prayer, close your shop, we will arrest you. But if you don’t, then we have to bring the punishment on you, you will be killed, and nobody will pray on you."
- Abu Usamah saying that homosexuals should be killed by throwing them off a cliff, saying "Take that homosexual man and throw him off the mountain."

== Mosques and Islamic Centers investigated ==
- Markazi Jamiat Ahl-e-Hadith
- UK Islamic Mission (UKIM)
- London Central Mosque and Islamic Cultural Centre in Regent's Park
- Green Lane Mosque, Birmingham
- Ahl-e-Hadith mosque, in Derby
- UKIM's Sparkbrook Islamic Centre, Birmingham

== Response ==
Members of the British Conservative and Labour parties requested an official investigation into the alleged dissemination of "hate speech" at mosques.

Muslim groups such as the Islamic Human Rights Commission (IHRC) condemned the documentary as "another example of anti-Muslim hostility," stating that it "exemplifies the problems of inherent Islamophobia and racism within the mainstream media." The Muslim Council of Britain criticised it as "heavily hyped," while its Secretary-General, Muhammad Abdul Bari, described it as employing the "dishonest tactic of selectively quoting from some recorded speeches for the purpose of misrepresentation." The Islamic Cultural Center of London, the UK Islamic Mission, and the Markazi Jamiat Ahle-hadith organisations, all of whom are featured in the documentary, issued separate responses. In a press release, the Saudi Arabian Embassy in London denied the charges made by the documentary, labelling them as "false allegations."

The Saltley Gate Peace Group issued a press release giving its "undiminished support" to the Green Lane Masjid stating that Imam Abu Usamah "…is accepted by much of his congregation and the wider interfaith community to be a peaceful man and is known to promote peace to his congregation," and that Abu Usamah "…encourages worshippers to avoid 'political Islam and radicalism.'"

Abu Usamah of Green Lane mosque has also alleged that his words were taken out of context.

== Similar programme on the BBC ==
The BBC's Panorama programme, aired on 21 August 2005, had previously studied similar issues at various mosques in the UK. The Muslim Council of Britain denounced the Panorama programme as "deeply unfair". The BBC rejected allegations of institutional or programme bias.

== Investigations by the police and the CPS; Ofcom, libel case ==
West Midlands Police launched an investigation, immediately after the programme was transmitted, into whether criminal offences had been committed by those teaching or preaching at the mosques and other establishments. They presented their evidence to the Crown Prosecution Service (CPS) who advised that "a realistic prospect of a conviction was unlikely".

However Bethan David of the CPS agreed with West Midlands Police Assistant Chief Constable Anil Patani (security and cohesion) that a damaging and distorting impression had been given of the speakers by the programme. On 7 August 2007 the CPS issued a statement:

"West Midlands Police have completed their investigation into the Channel 4 Dispatches programme 'Undercover Mosque' broadcast in January 2007. The police investigation initially looked at whether there had been any criminal offences committed by those featured in the programme and following careful consideration by the Crown Prosecution Service (CPS), West Midlands Police have been advised that there is insufficient evidence to bring charges against those individuals featured within the programme.

"West Midlands Police acknowledge the concerns that some parts of the programme may have been considered offensive, however when analysed in their full context there was not enough evidence to bring criminal charges against any individual. ACC Anil Patani for West Midlands Police said: "As a result of our initial findings, the investigation was then extended to include issues relating to the editing and portrayal of the documentary. The priority for West Midlands Police has been to investigate the documentary and its making with as much rigour as the extremism the programme sought to portray".

"The police investigation concentrated on three speakers and their comments in the programme. CPS reviewing lawyer Bethan David considered 56 hours of media footage of which only a small part was used in the programme. She said: "The splicing together of extracts from longer speeches appears to have completely distorted what the speakers were saying. "The CPS has demonstrated that it will not hesitate to prosecute those responsible for criminal incitement. But in this case we have been dealing with a heavily edited television programme, apparently taking out of context aspects of speeches, which, in their totality, could never provide a realistic prospect of any convictions".

"The CPS was also asked by the police to consider whether a prosecution under the Public Order Act 1986 should be brought against Channel 4 for broadcasting a programme including material likely to stir up racial hatred. Miss David advised West Midlands Police that on the evidence available, there was insufficient evidence that racial hatred had been stirred up as a direct consequence of the programme. It would also be necessary to identify a key individual responsible for doing this together with an intent to stir up racial hatred, which was not possible.

"West Midlands Police has taken account of this advice and explored options available to them and has now referred the matter to the broadcasting regulators Ofcom as a formal complaint. West Midlands Police has also informed Channel 4 of this course of action."

West Midlands Police then complained to Ofcom that the programme had been subject to such an intensity of editing that those who had been featured in the programme had been misrepresented (creating an unfair, unjust and inaccurate perception of both some speakers and sections of the Muslim community within the West Midlands); the footage had been edited in a way that resulted in material being broadcast in a form so altered from the form originally delivered that it was "sufficient to undermine community cohesion"; and the programme was "likely to undermine feelings of public reassurance and safety of those communities in the West Midlands for which the Chief Constable has a responsibility".

The resulting complaints to Ofcom were rejected by Ofcom on 19 November 2007. "Undercover Mosque was a legitimate investigation, uncovering matters of important public interest... On the evidence (including untransmitted footage and scripts), Ofcom found that the broadcaster had accurately represented the material it had gathered and dealt with the subject matter responsibly and in context." Ofcom also did not uphold complaints from the Kingdom of Saudi Arabia & the Royal Embassy of Saudi Arabia, from the Islamic Cultural Centre, and from the London Central Mosque.

In a move supported by Channel Four, the makers of the documentary then launched a libel action against the CPS and West Midlands Police. In a statement released for Kevin Sutcliffe and programme makers Hardcash Productions said:

"The statements made by both the West Midlands Police and the CPS were completely unfounded and seriously damaging to our reputation. We feel the only way to set the record straight once and for all is to pursue this matter through a libel action."

On 15 May 2008 when the matter came to the High Court, West Midlands Police and the Crown Prosecution Service apologised to the makers of the documentary for accusing them of distortion and agreed to a payment of £100,000. The statement, released to the media by West Midlands Police, after the High Court hearing, said they now accepted there had been no evidence that Channel 4 or the documentary makers had "misled the audience or that the programme was likely to encourage or incite criminal activity".

It added that the Ofcom report showed the documentary had "accurately represented the material it had gathered and dealt with the subject matter responsibly and in context". The police statement concluded: "We accept, without reservation, the conclusions of Ofcom and apologise to the programme makers for the damage and distress caused by our original press release." The same statement was later posted on the Crown Prosecution Service website.

Kevin Sutcliffe, deputy head of current affairs at Channel 4, said the apology was a vindication of the programme team in exposing extreme views. "Channel 4 was fully aware of the sensitivities surrounding the subject matter but recognised the programme's findings were clearly a matter of important public interest. The authorities should be doing all they can to encourage investigations like this, not attempting to publicly rubbish them for reasons they have never properly explained," he said. Channel 4 boss Julian Bellamy said they had had no choice but to pursue action when the police and CPS refused to withdraw their remarks.

The National Secular Society (NSS) subsequently called for a public enquiry into the role of the West Midlands Police and the CPS in referring the matter to Ofcom in the first place. Keith Porteous Wood, executive director of the NSS, said:

"While the Police and CPS have now apologised, they have yet to explain why this apology was not issued in response to the widespread public outcry during 2007 about their targeting of Channel 4 or even to the total rejection by OFCOM of Police/CPS complaints on 19 November 2007. It had to be forced on them by the courts. The intransigence of the Police and CPS has seriously undermined public confidence in both institutions."

== Sequels ==
On 1 September 2008, Channel 4 broadcast Undercover Mosque: The Return.

On 14 February 2011, Channel 4 broadcast a third installment titled Lessons in Hate and Violence on Dispatches. It revealed violence against children, in mosques which are also used as Islamic schools. The two main mosques were the Darul Uloom Islamic High School in Birmingham and the Markazi Jamia Mosque in Keighley.

=== Undercover Mosque: The Return ===
Undercover Mosque: The Return is a sequel to the Undercover Mosque produced by the independent television company Hardcash Productions for the Channel 4 series Dispatches which aired in the UK on 1 September 2008 at 8pm. Again, the programme uses footage filmed by undercover reporters in UK mosques and Islamic institutions as well as interviews with Muslim academics and prominent figures. It contains statements by Islamic preachers which espouse violence towards homosexual men, other religions and apostates. The programme focuses on three institutions in London:

- London Central Mosque
- King Fahad Academy
- Muslim World League.

The programme suggests that these organisations are controlled directly or indirectly by the Saudi religious establishment and that they promulgate the Saudi interpretation of Islam known as Wahhabism.

==== London Central Mosque ====
The London Central Mosque issued a press release responding to the Dispatches programme on its website.

==== Khalid Yasin ====
One of the people quoted in the program was Khalid Yasin. His videos were found to be on sale in the Regents Park mosque bookshop espousing extremist views such as public beheadings, amputations, lashings and crucifixions. He is quoted in the programme as saying that "people can see people without hands, people can see in public heads rolling down the street, people can see in public people got their hands and feet from opposite sides chopped off and they see them crucified, they see people get punished they see people put up against the pole? ... and because they see it, it acts as a deterrent for them because they say I don't want that to happen to me."

Yasin published an online response to an email from the producer in which Yasin wrote: "Not only are you inaccurate, but you are scandalous, unethical and merchants of journalistic vomit. Your motives are not morally driven, nor aimed at the intellectualisation of your viewers. Rather, you are resorting to the use of cheap sensational journalism, to exploit an unaware and pre-conditioned public, in order to make the "bottom line" profit that sustains your "Channel 4 – HardCore" vomit factory."

Yasin added that "the response in its entirety will be broadcast on seventeen television platforms around the world, and made available to hundreds of magazines and periodicals, for their comparison edification. I will utilize my relationship with these media platforms to counter your evil intent. In addition to that, I am challenging Channel 4 and Hard4Cash (or HardCore) Ltd. to an unedited open-ended interview, to discuss my views and responses to their media productions, past and present! If you do not accept, hundreds of millions viewers will be aware of your one-sided, prejudicial campaigns against Islam and Muslims!"

== See also ==
- Feiz Mohammad – Australian Muslim Islamic fundamentalist preacher; head of the Global Islamic Youth Centre in Sydney
- Criticism of Islam
- Criticism of Islamism
- Londonistan: How Britain is Creating a Terror State Within
