= Ranarim =

Swedish folk band

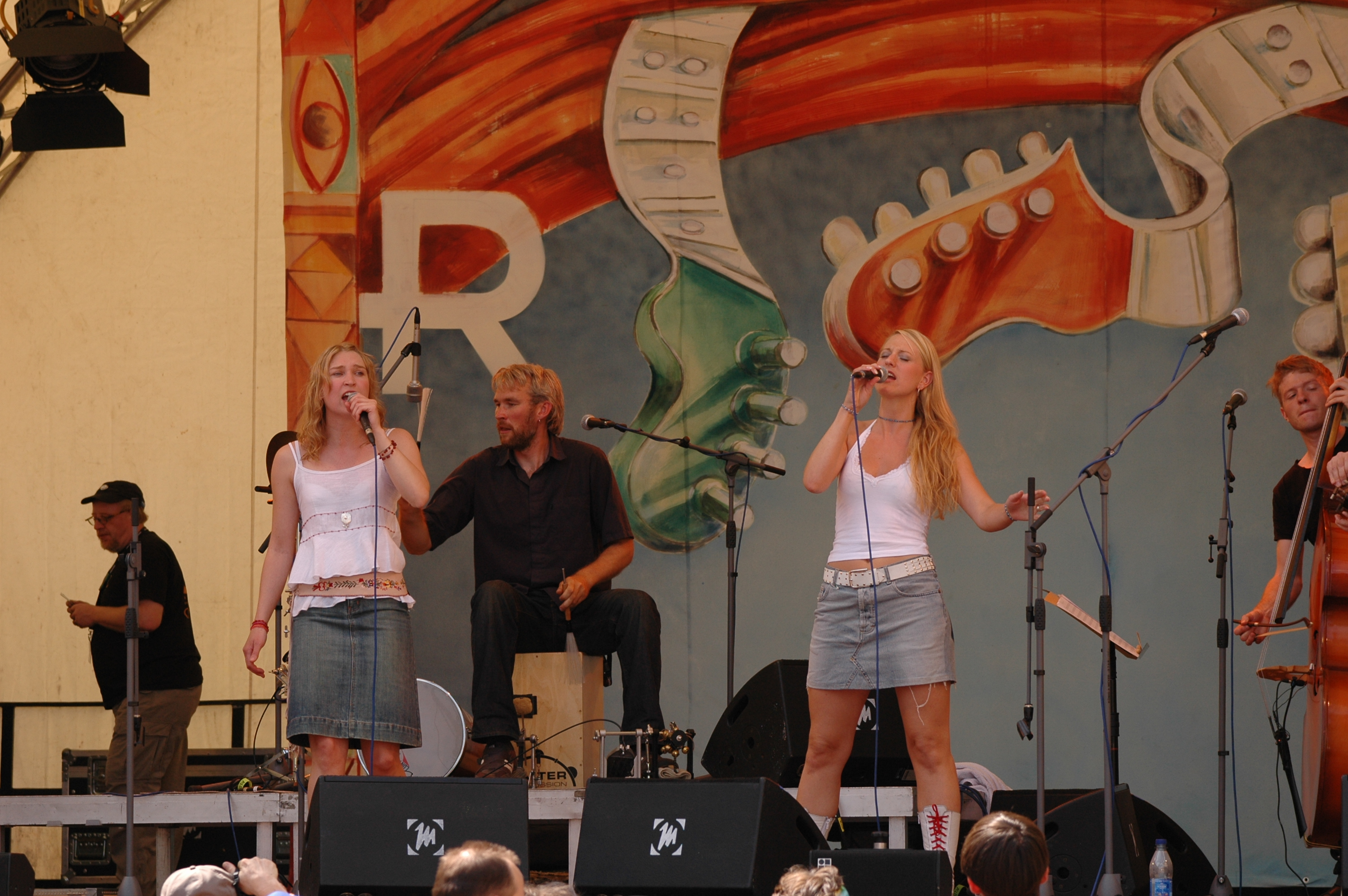
Ranarim at TFF.Rudolstadt 2005

Ranarim were a folk band from Sweden. Their last line up consisted of Sofia Sandén and Ulrika Bodén on vocals, Niklas Roswall on nyckelharpa, Jens Engelbrecht on guitar and mandola, Anders Johnsson on double bass, and Olle Linder on percussion. They played a mixture of traditional and original folk compositions.

Ranarim were formed while Sofia Sandén, Ulrika Bodén, Niklas Roswall and Jens Engelbrecht were at the Royal Academy of Music in Stockholm together.

Niklas Roswall won the 1996 Nyckelharpa World Championship and has also released a solo album. He is also a member of the Nyckelharpa Orchestra.

Ulrika Bodén and Sofia Sandén also performed as part of Rosenberg 7, an all-female vocal group led by Susanne Rosenberg.

'Ranarim' translates literally as 'dew tapestry' ('rana' means a woven tapestry or rug; 'rim' is an old Swedish word for 'dew').

The song 'Skulle Jag Sörja' from the album 'För Världen Älskar Vad Som Är Brokot' is based on the famous poem of the same name by the Swedish poet Lucidor.

They performed their final concert on December 15 2010.

== Discography ==
- Till Ljusan Dag (Till The Light of Day) (2000)
- För Världen Älskar Vad Som Är Brokot (the World Loves the Unexpected) (2003) (featuring Sebastian Notini on percussion)
- Morgonstjärna (Morning Star) (2006)
- Alle vid den ljusa stjärnan (By the starlight) (2008)
- Sayonara - EP (Playing With Music) (2010)
- Nordic Woman (2012)
