= 101 East =

- No. of episodes: 400+

Production
- Running time: 25 minutes

Original release
- Network: Al Jazeera English; Al Jazeera Balkans (Priče s İstoka)
- Release: November 2006 – present

101 East is a weekly television programme, broadcast by Al Jazeera English, that produces in-depth investigative documentaries from across Asia and the Pacific. The show launched in 2006 and operates out of Al Jazeera's Asia bureau in Kuala Lumpur, Malaysia.

== Team ==
101 East has a strong and diverse international team of in-house staff as well as freelance contributors.

== Awards ==
101 East has won a number of industry awards including two Walkley awards, an AIB award, a Royal Television Society award, Human Rights Awards, and medals from the New York Festivals International Television & Film Awards. 101 East has also been nominated for three Emmy Awards.
