= America's War on Abortion =

- Genre: Documentary
- Directed by: Deeyah Khan
- Theme music composer: Nick Kingsley; Danny Farrant
- Country of origin: United Kingdom
- Original language: English

Production
- Producers: Andrew Smith; Darin Prindle
- Cinematography: Deeyah Khan; Darin Prindle
- Editors: Michael Ho; Andrew Smith
- Running time: 68 minutes
- Production company: Fuuse Film

Original release
- Network: ITV
- Release: 29 October 2020

America's War on Abortion is a 2020 documentary film by Deeyah Khan. The film is produced by Khan's production company Fuuse and received its world premiere on ITV and NRK2 on October 29, 2020.

Filmed before and during the 2020 global crisis, Khan turns her focus to what she see as extreme beliefs weaponised under Trump's rule. In America's War on Abortion, she examines the erosion of reproductive rights in the US, featuring accounts from activists fighting for – and against – women's right to choose.

Khan investigates one of the most divisive issues in American politics. She films at abortion clinics and meets the abortion providers and the women who seek abortions. The film also features a man convicted of bombing and burning clinics.

== Cast ==
- Dr. Yashica Robinson
- Julie Burkhart
- Jen Jordan
- Dr. Sanithia Williams
- Donald Spitz
- Alex
- Catherine Ramey
- Josephine Petersen
- Daniel and Mary

== Accolades ==
Year	Award	Category	Result
2021	British Academy Film Awards	Current Affairs	Won
2021	Edinburgh International Television Festival	Best Documentary	Won
2021	British Academy Film Awards	Director:Factual	Nominated
2021	Royal Television Society	Director:Factual	Nominated
2021	British Journalism Awards	Best International Affairs Documentary	Nominated
2021	AIB Media Excellence Awards	Foreign Affairs Journalism	Nominated
