= Memini =

International NGO against honour killings

- Founded: 2011
- Purpose: Against Violence
- Location: international
- Region served: worldwide
- Method: Remembrance, Peaceful protest, Internet activism, Journalism
- Key people: Deeyah Khan (the founder), global volunteer driven initiative
- Website: www.memini.co

Memini is a global digital initiative driven entirely by volunteers internationally to promote remembrance of victims of honour killings worldwide.

Memini means ‘I remember’ in Latin. The Memini initiative documents the stories of young women and men globally who have lost their life in the name of family and community honour. It is the largest database of stories of cases of honour killings on the internet. A core purpose of honour killings is to remove all existence of the victims Memini intends the opposite.

Norwegian artist and activist Deeyah Khan founded Memini in early 2011.
