= Green Lane Masjid =

Former public baths and library complex and current Muslim centre in Birmingham

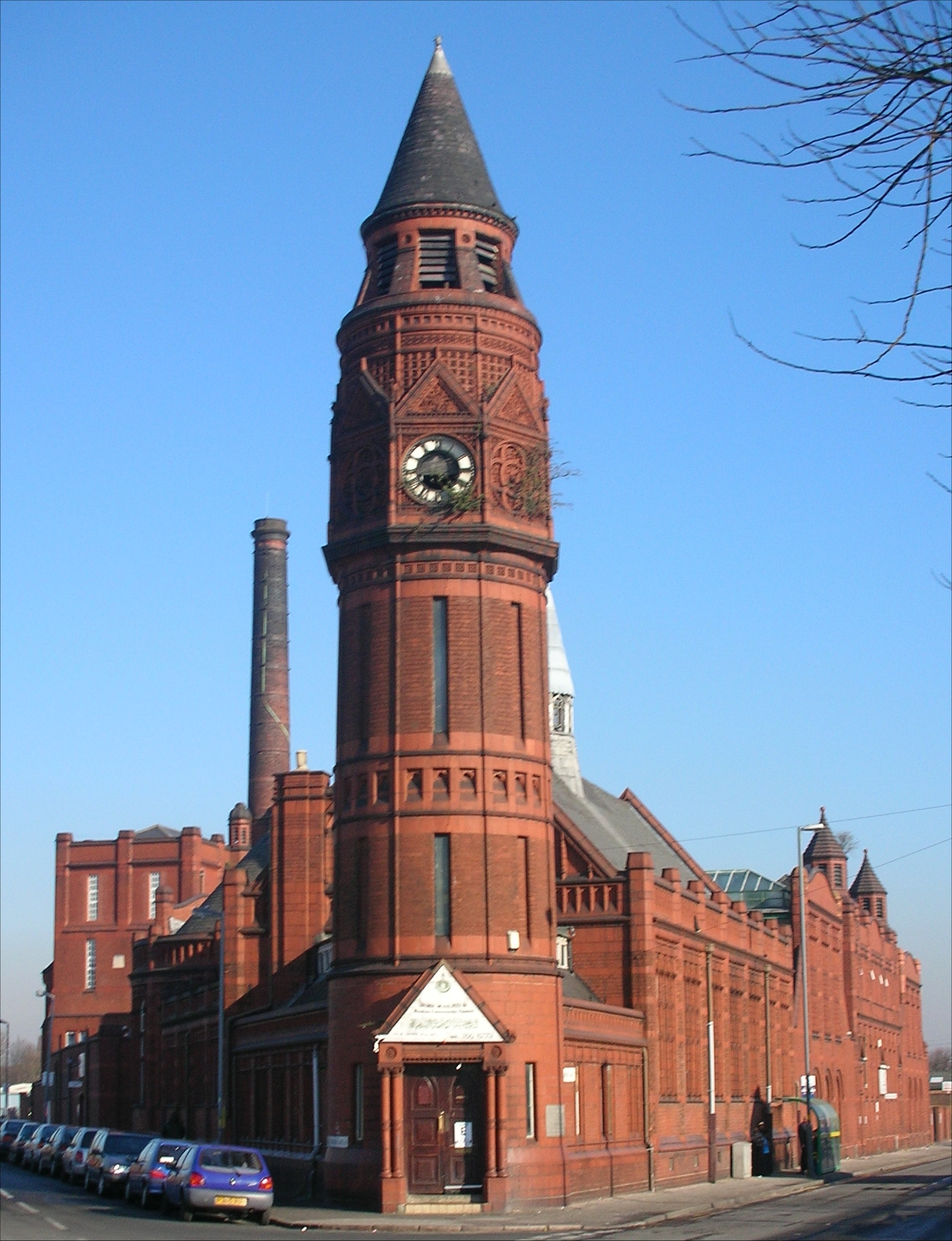
- The Masjid, formerly Green Lane Public Library and Baths (Martin & Chamberlain 1893–1902)

Religion
- Affiliation: Ahl-i Hadith Salafism

Location
- Location: Small Heath, Birmingham England
- Interactive map of Green Lane Masjid
- Coordinates: 52°28′23.30″N 1°51′50.90″W

Architecture
- Architect: Martin & Chamberlain
- Type: mosque
- Style: Gothic-Jacobean style
- Completed: 1893/1902, 1970s
- Capacity: 3,500 (including women)
- Designated as NHL

Listed Building – Grade II
- Designated: 8 July 1982
- Reference no.: 1211476
- Listed Name: Small Heath Public Library and Baths

Website
- www.greenlanemasjid.org

Green Lane Masjid & Community Centre (GLMCC), is a mosque in Birmingham. It has been a registered charity in England since 2008. The Masjid occupies a prominent corner site in Green Lane, Small Heath, Birmingham.

The complex includes prayer halls for men and women, a community hall, madrasah, library, shop, and some accommodation. It also provides funeral services to the local Muslim community. In a 2007 national competition to find the country's 'Model Mosque' run by the British Islam Channel, the mosque came second, behind the Madni Jamia Masjid.

== History ==
One of the buildings was originally constructed as a public library and baths, designed by local architects Martin & Chamberlain and built in the redbrick and terracotta Gothic-Jacobean style between 1893 and 1902. It is a Grade II listed building.

The building was purchased by the Markazi Jamiat Ahle-Hadith in 1979 at the price of £24,000.

The Mosque was relocated from two terraced houses on George Arthur Road in Alum Rock to the acquired building in Green Lane, Small Heath.

== Projects and Campaigns ==
In Birmingham each year since 2011 there is an Eid al-Fitr celebration in Small Heath Park. This began as "an outdoor prayer facilitated by Green Lane Masjid and Community Centre." This was attended by 44,000 people in 2014, 60,000 in 2015, 88,000 in 2016 and 100,000 in 2017 and is organised by Green Lane Masjid and five other local mosques.

In addition, GLMCC runs and participates in various projects aimed at raising funds for charity and providing services for needy causes. Some of these include collaborating with My Foster Family, an organisation which raises awareness of foster care in the Muslim community, to distribute care packages for Ramadan throughout Birmingham "aimed at uniting non-Muslim foster carers with the Muslim children they look after are being handed out during Ramadan."

In 2019, GLMCC made headlines for their announcement of a 'plastic-free Ramadan' in collaboration with ecobirmingham. In efforts to combat the issue of plastic waste, the Mosque installed water fountains throughout its building, opting instead to sell reusable water bottles to congregants rather than distributing free water bottles as it had done in previous years.

GLMCC has also made a Food bank for the local community.

== Charity work ==
The Mosque also raises money through donations from congregants, estimated to reach £1million in the month of Ramadan in 2019, which will be used towards providing meals for Syrian refugees as well as for community iftars held by the Mosque for local residents weekly throughout the month.

== Events ==
Every Ramadan, GLMCC hosts Tarawih prayers every night, which in an average hosts around 2000 to 3000 people per night.

GLMCC also hosts a Winter Islamic Conference, and other Islamic conferences every year, which hosts different Shaykhs and Islamic Scholars, as topics such as Fiqh, Aqeeda, Hadith and Quran are taught and discussed.

== Controversy ==
It was also one of the mosques featured in Channel 4's 2007 Dispatches programme Undercover Mosque, which investigated religious extremism in British mosques, including preachers advocating violence, anti-Semitism, sexism, and homophobia. West Midlands Police subsequently carried out an investigation into whether criminal offenses had been committed by those preaching or teaching at the mosque. While West Midlands Police believed there was a case to answer and submitted their evidence to the CPS (Crown Prosecution Service), the CPS ruled that "a realistic prosecution was unlikely." The police subsequently investigated the programme itself and submitted a report to Ofcom on the basis of "unfair editing" designed to misrepresent the subjects of the programme. Ofcom ruled that there was no case to answer and that it was a "legitimate investigation." Both Channel 4 and the programme makers sued the CPS for libel, and settled for a payment of £100,000.

In 2023, £2.2 million of government funding for a youth centre at the mosque was withheld after a clip of its Head Imam Zakaullah Saleem (more formally, Zaka Ullah Saleem) discussing stoning women went viral on social media. The mosque claimed that the clip was "deliberately taken out of context".

== See also ==
- Islam in the United Kingdom
- Islamic schools and branches
- List of mosques in the United Kingdom
