= Sanam Naraghi-Anderlini =

Iranian author and United Nations consultant

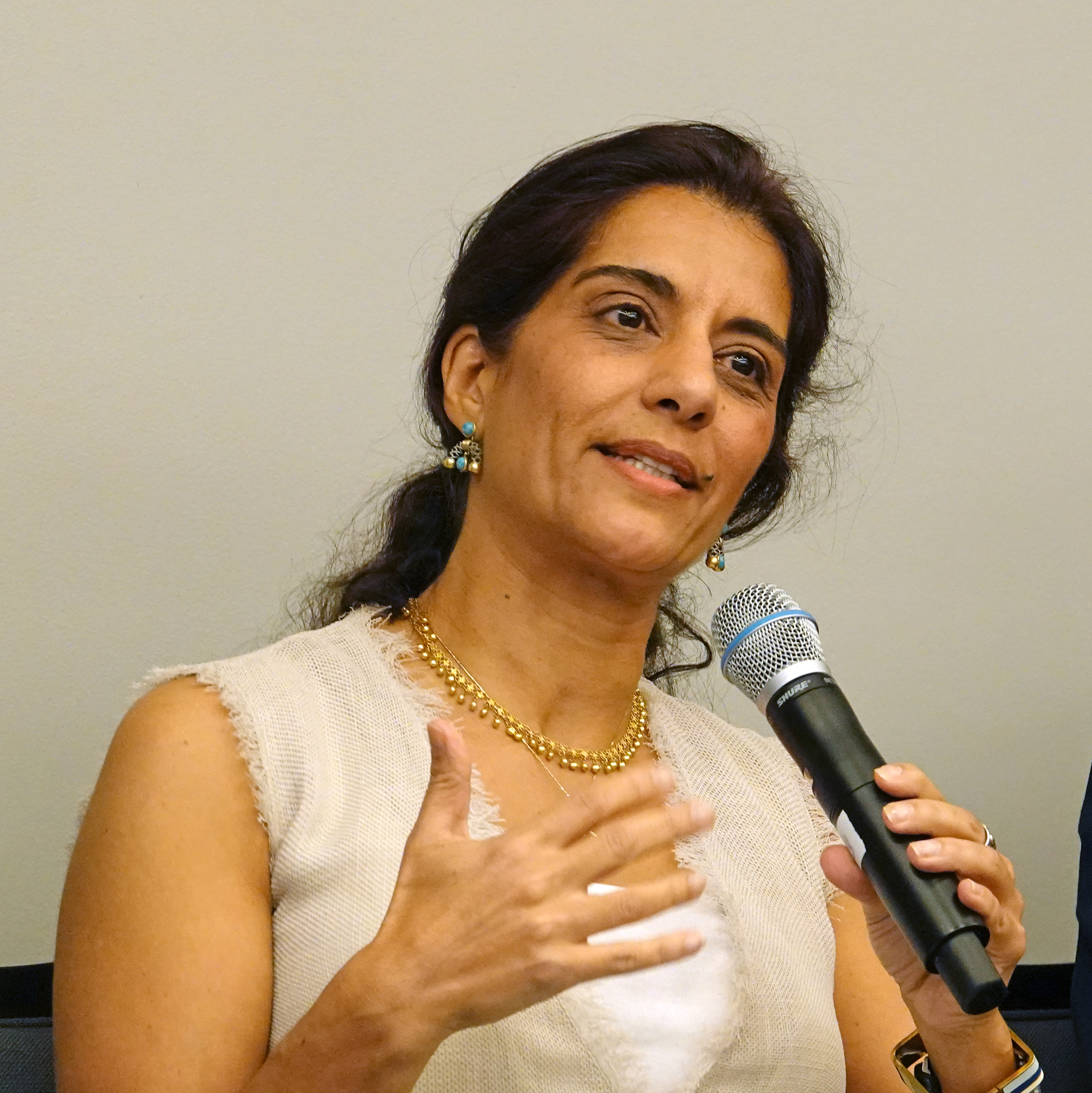
- Born: 29 October 1967 (age 58); Iran

Sanam Naraghi Anderlini, MBE (29 October 1967) is a British-Iranian author and Founder and Executive Director of the International Civil Society Action Network (ICAN). She has been a peace strategist working on conflicts, crises and violent extremism and as a consultant to the United Nations on the subject of women and conflict. Naraghi Anderlini joined LSE as Director of the Centre for Women, Peace and Security in December 2019.

== Early life and education ==
Naraghi-Anderlini was born in Iran and she attended the American Community School until she was six. She moved to London aged eleven and she attended Cobham Hall Girls' School. She received her BA from Oxford Brookes and an MPhil. in Social Anthropology from Cambridge University. She speaks four languages and has identical twin daughters. Sattareh Farman Farmaian, the author of Daughters of Persia, and the founder of social work in Iran was her maternal aunt.

== Career ==
In 2000, Naraghi Anderlini was a civil society leader and drafter of UN Security Council Resolution 1325 on women, peace and security.

In 2011 she was the first Senior Expert on Gender and Inclusion to the UN's Mediation Standby Team, working on Somalia, Libya and Syria. In 2014 ICAN and UN Women hosted the first Better Peace Forum to review women's participation in ongoing peace processes. This led to the development of ICAN's Better Peace Initiative (BPI) and Better Peace Tool. Under the leadership of Naraghi Anderlini, ICAN has developed the Innovative Peace Fund (IPF) - a multi-donor fund to channel resources to women-led peacebuilding organisations.

She served as a board member of the National Iranian American Council (NIAC) for approximately three years until 2018. She previously held posts in London at the charity International Alert (London) and the Forum for Early Action and Early Warning (London) and she was director of the Women's Policy Commission of Women Waging Peace in Washington DC. Her work on gender and conflict has involved her with women peace activists in Sri Lanka, Nepal and Liberia for the U.N. Population Fund, the U.N. Development Programme, and UN Women.

She was on the Steering Board of the UK's National Action Plan on Women, Peace and Security, the Commonwealth's Panel of Experts on CVE and UNDP's Civil Society Advisory Council. Her views on women peace negotiators was featured in the New York Times in October 2020.

=== Writing ===
Naraghi Anderlini's book "Women Building Peace, What they do why it matters" was published in 2007. She is coauthor, with Kumar Rupesinghe, of Civil Wars, Civil Peace: An Introduction to Conflict Resolution, What the Women Say: Participation and UNSCR 1325 (ICAN/MIT), and articles for openDemocracy, Foreign Policy, The Guardian, Ms. Magazine, Foreign Affairs, and others. Her writing is cited by others writing about conflict and gender.
