= Sunday Report (Hong Kong TV series) =

Sunday Report is a TVB News programme which first aired on Tuesday March 10, 1987. It airs Sunday at 7pm on TVB Jade.
