= Hardcash Productions =

Television production company

Hardcash Productions is a British independent television production company set up by David Henshaw in 1992.

Hardcash specialises in current affairs programmes and has won a range of awards - including seven Emmys, three BAFTAs, the Prix Italia, seven Royal Television Society Awards, three Peabodys and three Griersons. Hardcash most recently won a BAFTA for its 2022 ITV Exposure film 'Fearless: The Women Fighting Putin'.. David Henshaw was made a Fellow of the Royal Television Society in 2009. In 2022, Esella Hawkey became Hardcash's Creative Director. Most recently, Hardcash won the 2023 Emmy for Best Long Form Feature with Putin's War at Home (ITV and PBS Frontline).

The Hardcash name came from an undercover investigation about rogue employers made by Henshaw for the BBC. The series was never aired for legal reasons. Despite this a specially recorded CD “ Hard Cash” was released with songs “inspired” from the series. Henshaw set up Hardcash to remake the programme for Channel 4 as an episode of the Cutting Edge series. It was broadcast under the simple title Undercover and started the Undercover Britain and Countryside Undercover strands of covert investigations.

Hardcash has specialised in making investigative documentaries in some of the world's most dangerous places - including North Korea, Iran, and Saudi Arabia. At home, the company has exposed the abusive treatment of both the young and old in privately run care homes and hospitals, reported on disability issues, and filmed undercover in exposing modern day slavery.

In September 2023, Hardcash produced the Channel 4 Dispatches investigation Russell Brand: In Plain Sight, in association with the Times and Sunday Times. The programme won the highest audience share ever for Dispatches.

== Programmes ==
- Undercover Mosque
- Undercover Mosque: The Return
- Saudi Arabia Uncovered
- Undercover in Britain's New Far Right
- Qatar - State of Fear?
- The Truth About Disability Benefits
- Will the NHS Care for Me?
- Broke: Britain's Debt Emergency
- Inside Russia: Putin's War at Home
