= Jihad: A Story of the Others =

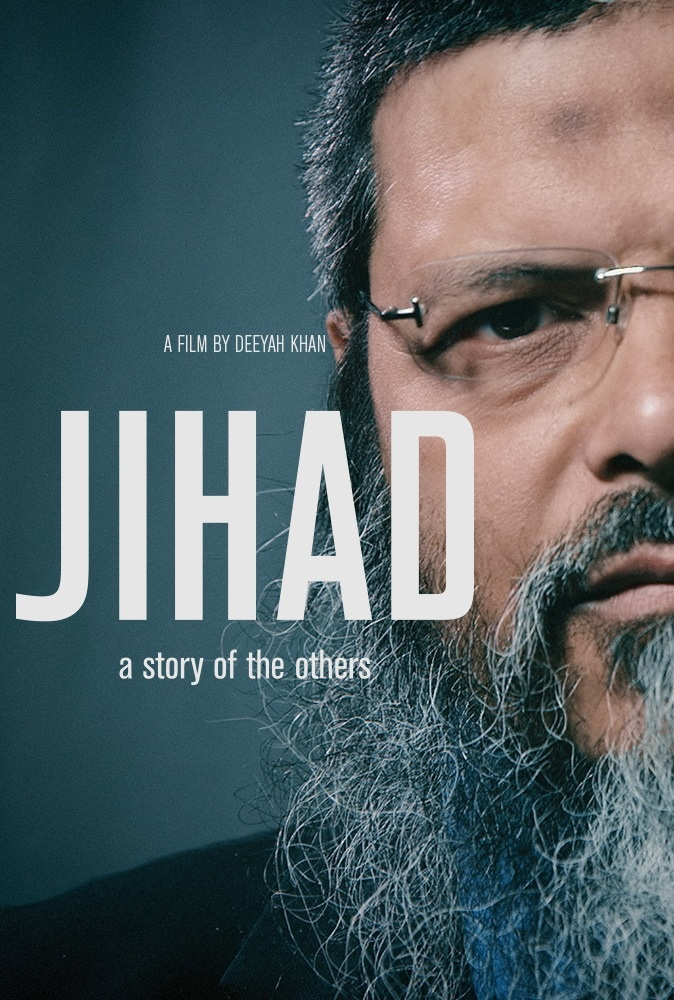
- Directed by: Deeyah Khan
- Starring: Abu Muntasir; Alyas Karmani; Munir Zamir; Usama Hasan; Shahid Butt; Yasmin Mulbocus
- Countries of origin: United Kingdom; Norway
- Original language: English

Production
- Producers: Darin Prindle; Andrew Smith
- Cinematography: Neil Harvey
- Editor: Kevin Thomas
- Running time: 50 minutes

Original release
- Release: 15 June 2015

Jihad: A Story of the Others is a 2015 documentary film by Norwegian director Deeyah Khan. The film is produced by Khan's production company Fuuse. Jihad is the outcome of a two-year investigation by Deeyah and provides a view from the inside about what it is like to be drawn into radicalism. The documentary film sets out to provide an insight into why some young Muslims in the West embrace violent extremism and go abroad to fight holy wars and in some cases why they came to reject it.

"It's not about ideals – 90% of them never subscribe to the ideals – it's other factors that are a draw. This is the new rock and roll; jihad is sexy. The kid who was not very good-looking now looks good holding a gun. He can get a bride now, he's powerful. The Isis gun is as much a penis extension as the stockbroker with his Ferrari".
Alyas Karmani, speaking to the Observer

== Synopsis ==
The documentary looks at the intimate personal reasons people are drawn into radicalism and how some find their way out of it. It shows that Westerners embracing jihad is nothing new and has been going on since the 1980s.

In Jihad, Deeyah meets one of the godfathers of the British and Western jihadi movement, who went abroad to fight, and who preached extremism to thousands of young Muslims across the UK and the West.

Deeyah's search for answers then takes her to the streets of modern Britain, meeting today's young Muslims, caught between extremism and the war on terror. She meets young British Muslims who feel angry and alienated, facing issues of discrimination, identity crises and rejection by both mainstream society and their own communities and families. In moments of insight and enlightenment, she also finds hope and some possible answers to the complex situation we are currently in.

== Accolades ==
Year	Award	Category	Result
2016	New York International Independent Film and Video Festival	Best Short Documentary	Won
2016	Norwegian Ministry of Arts & Culture	Human Rights Award	Won
2016	Grierson Awards	Best Documentary on Current Affairs	Nominated
2016	British Academy Film Awards	Best International Current Affairs Documentary	Nominated
2016	Golden Nymph Award	56th award for Current Affair's Documentary	Nominated
2017	Creative Diversity Network Awards	Best Current Affairs Program	Nominated
