= White Right: Meeting the Enemy =

2017 documentary

- Exposure episode
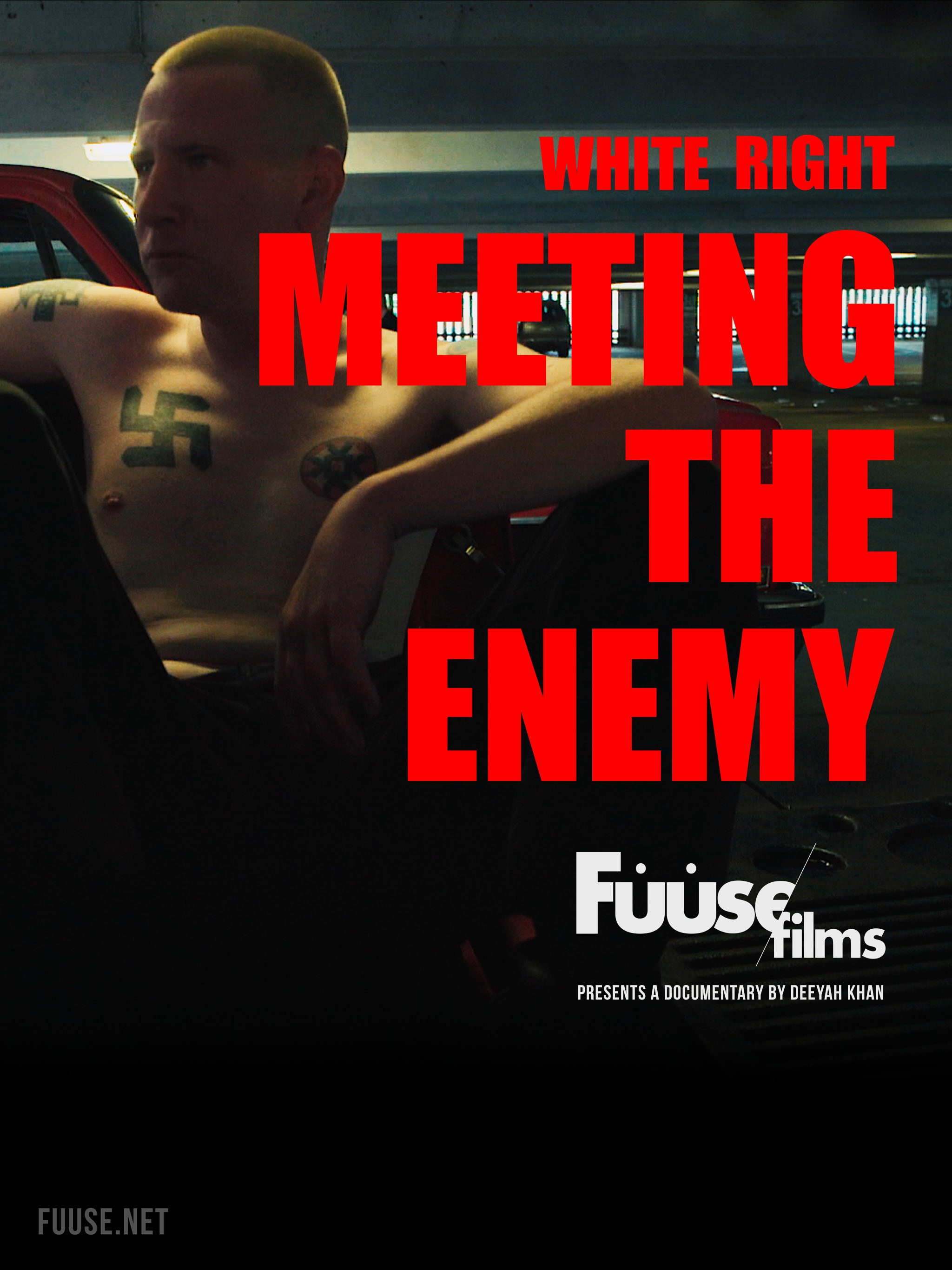
- Episode no.: Series 7 Episode 2
- Directed by: Deeyah Khan
- Cinematography by: Deeyah Khan; Darin Prindle
- Editing by: Melanie Quigley
- Original air date: 11 December 2017
- Running time: 60 minutes

"White Right: Meeting the Enemy" is a 2017 documentary that aired as an episode of British current affairs TV series Exposure. The documentary was directed by Deeyah Khan and produced by Deeyah's production company Fuuse.

Deeyah travels to the United States to meet with some of the country's most prominent neo-Nazis and white supremacist leaders to seek to understand the personal and political reasons behind the apparent resurgence of far-right extremism in America. She made the film after being interviewed on TV about multiculturalism for which she received many threats and hate speech on social media.

Carol Midgley, writing for The Times, wrote of the film: "Part investigative journalist, part almost psychotherapist, Khan uses hard and soft skills to discover what drives such hatred and forces people to face her, their so-called enemy".

== Synopsis ==
"White Right: Meeting the Enemy" sees Deeyah sitting down face-to-face with neo-Nazis and white nationalists after receiving death threats and racially-charged hate mail from the Far Right movement as a result of giving a BBC TV interview advocating diversity and multiculturalism. In the film Deeyah tries to get behind the hatred and the violent ideology, to try to understand why people embrace far right extremism.

After covering a Ku Klux Klan rally in Charlottesville, Virginia, she received permission to meet with Jeff Schoep, the leader of the National Socialist Movement (NSM). Afterwards she receives permission to film the group at the Unite the Right rally in Charlottesville, where the group gets into an altercation with and are pepper-sprayed by Antifa counter-protestors. After the death of Heather Heyer and President Donald Trump's controversial remarks on the rally, Schoep takes Deeyah to the urban decay in Detroit and explains that he moved the organization's headquarters to the city to take advantage of its economic decline for recruiting. Deeyah later tells Schoep about her experiences at anti-racist demonstrations during her childhood in Norway, and shows him both the BBC interview and the hate mail, causing Jeff to become visibly discomforted by the racial slurs in the emails.

Deeyah next travels to a training camp run by the NSM's director for public relations, Brian Culpepper, in rural Tennessee. After becoming well-acquainted with him, she asks Culpepper if he would follow through with his desire to deport all non-whites to create a white ethnostate if he would have to do it to her, and he demurs, then reluctantly says yes. She also visits antisemitic and homophobic skinhead Ken Parker at his home in Jacksonville, Florida, where he is studying political science. Although Ken goes through with his plan to make antisemitic flyers and distribute them to Jewish communities and synagogues, he begins to visibly develop positive attitudes towards Muslims, partially due to Deeyah's friendliness. His girlfriend would email her two weeks after the meeting informing her that Ken was expelled from the University of North Florida for a threatening post of himself holding a rifle on a student Facebook account however. Deeyah also notes the rise of the alt-right in the United States, and meets Richard B. Spencer, who displays an openly elitist attitude, and Jared Taylor, who compares multiculturalism to mental illness and HIV/AIDS.

In Milwaukee, Deeyah meets with Arno Michaelis, a former skinhead and lead singer of the white power rock band Centurion, who expresses remorse for his violent actions. She also travels to New York City to meet with a former skinhead, Frank Meeink, who explains he was drawn to neo-Nazism due to his troubled youth with intense physical abuse from an alcoholic father, providing him a source to psychologically project his hatred. She also meets with Pardeep Singh Kaleka, a survivor of the 2012 Wisconsin Sikh temple shooting in Oak Creek, learning how he now works with Michaelis to dissuade youth from extremism. Culpepper also makes a Skype call to Deeyah announcing his intent to resign from the NSM partially because of his meeting with her.

== Cast ==
- Frank Meeink
- Pardeep Singh Kaleka
- Arno Michaelis
- Jeff Schoep, leader of the National Socialist Movement
- Brian Culpepper
- Ken Parker
- Peter Tefft
- Richard B. Spencer
- Jared Taylor

== Accolades ==
Year	Award	Category	Result
2018	Emmy Award	Current Affairs.	Won
2018	Royal Television Society	Director - Documentary/Factual & Non Drama.	Won
2018	PeaceJam	Special Jury award	Won
2018	Rory Peck Award	Sony Impact Award for Current Affairs	Won
2018	WFTV Awards	The BBC News and Factual Award	Won
2018	Asian Media Awards	Best Investigation.	Won
2018	British Academy Film Awards	Current Affairs.	Nominated
2018	Frontline Club Awards	Broadcasting.	Nominated
2019	APA Film Festival	Best Short Film Award	Won
2019	Bellingham Human Rights Film Festival	Jury Awards	Won
