= Deeyah Khan =

Norwegian documentary film director (born 1977)

Deeyah Khan دیا خان
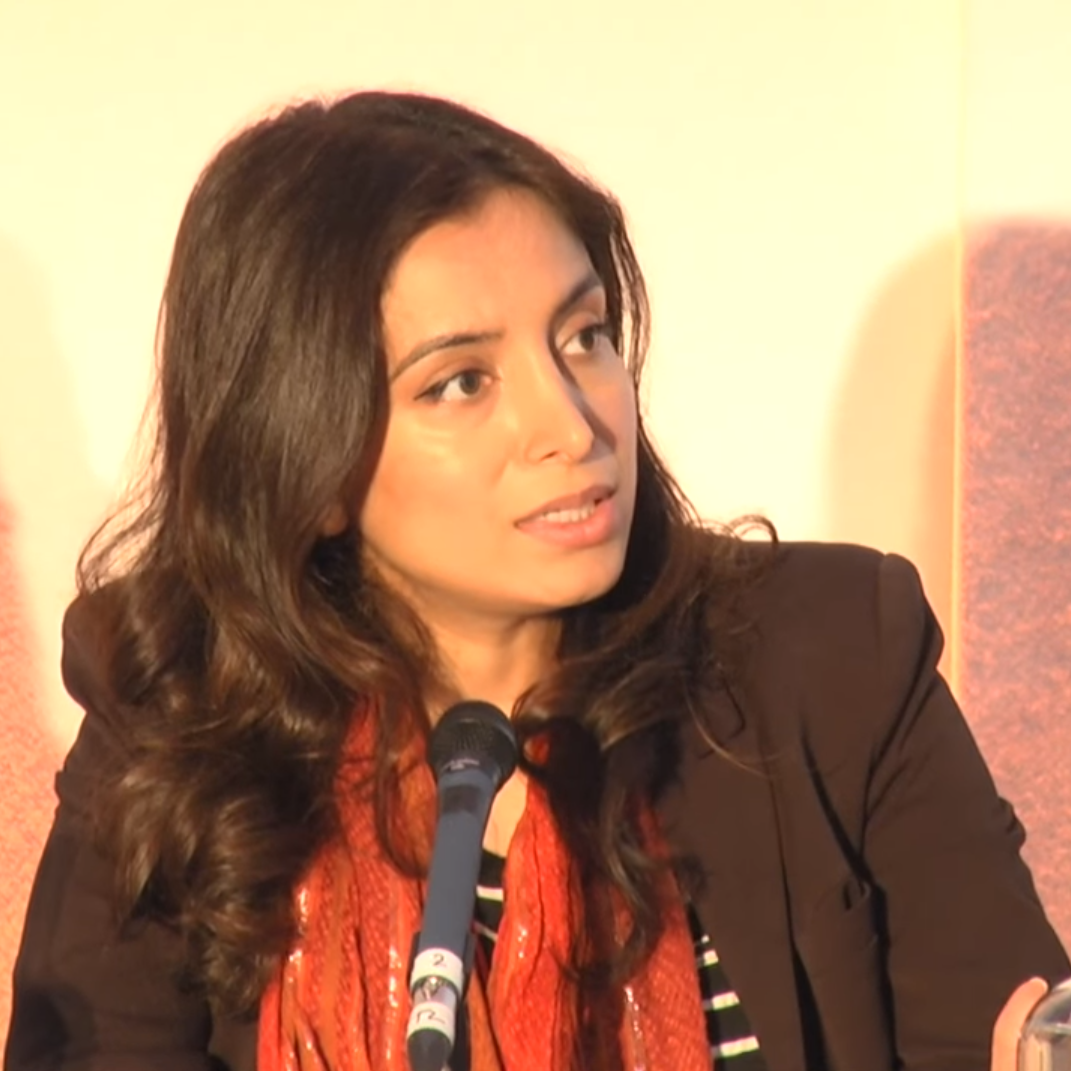
- Khan in 2017
- Born: 7 August 1977 (age 49); Oslo, Norway
- Occupations: Film director Founder & CEO of Fuuse
- Years active: 1992–present
- Known for: Banaz a Love Story; White Right: Meeting The Enemy
- Awards: Peabody Award (2013 & 2021); Emmy Award (2013 & 2018); British Royal Television Society Award (Best Director – Documentary/Factual 2018); BAFTA/ Current Affairs 2021
- Website: deeyah.com

Deeyah Khan (Urdu: دیا خان, pronounced [diːja xaːn], born 7 August 1977) is a Norwegian documentary film director and human rights activist. Deeyah is a two-time Emmy Award winner, two time Peabody Award winner, a BAFTA winner and has received the Royal Television Society award for Best Factual Director. She has made eight documentaries to date, all have been shown on ITV in the UK as part of its Exposure series.

Her debut film as director and producer, Banaz: A Love Story (2012) about the honor killing of a British-Kurdish woman won an Emmy and a Peabody.

Her second documentary, Jihad: A Story of the Others, nominated for a BAFTA, Grierson and Monte-Carlo Television Festival involved two years interviewing Islamic extremists and convicted terrorists. Her 2017 documentary White Right: Meeting The Enemy was also Bafta-nominated and won an Emmy award for Best International Current Affairs Documentary and the Rory Peck Award for Best Current Affairs documentary in 2018— this film saw Deeyah travel to the United States where she shadowed neo-Nazis at the Unite the Right rally in Charlottesville.

She is the founder and CEO of production company Fuuse, which specializes in documentary films, digital media platforms and content for television broadcasters and live events.

She is also the founder and editor-in-chief of sister-hood Magazine which spotlights the diverse voices of women of Muslim heritage.

In 2016 Khan became the inaugural UNESCO Goodwill Ambassador for Artistic Freedom and Creativity.

== Biography ==
=== Birth and ancestry ===
Khan was born at Ullevål University Hospital in Oslo, Norway to Pakistani Sunni Muslim parents, her mother being Pashtun and her father being Punjabi. Her brother is Adil Khan, a screen and theater actor.

=== Music training and early career ===
Khan started her career as a music artist, a singer and stage performer in the public eye in Norway from the age of 7. At first she was a singer and performer of traditional South Asian classical and folk music, then became a composer and producer of world music. Khan's father was a music enthusiast and in 1984 placed his seven-year-old daughter under the supervision of Ustad Bade Fateh Ali Khan. Deeyah studied Pakistani and North Indian classical forms of music under him.

At the age of eight, Deeyah made her first performance on national television appearing on the primetime show Halv Sju, then performed at festivals. Deeyah was also the member of NRK girls choir as well receiving some music lessons with African American soprano Anne Brown. She also spent several years receiving further musical training from Ustad Sultan Khan.

Because music is considered to be a dishonourable profession for women in many Muslim communities Khan faced severe abuse and death threats for several years in Norway. Initially the harassment and condemnation were directed towards her parents: "I remember my dad having to defend the fact that I was doing music, even as a child. I remember this at eight, nine years old where ... various people come to the house and say, 'We don't even let our sons do it, why would you let your daughter do this?'".

Despite the increased pressure and threats of violence Khan's family continued to support her. After being attacked on stage at her own concert and enduring sustained intimidation, she moved to London at the age of 17 to live and work.

She continued to compose and produce music. She recorded the CD Ataraxis as a vocalist in 2006 which featured jazz pianist Bob James, Police guitarist Andy Summers and Norwegian trumpeter Nils Petter Molvær. Khan continued to work in the music industry as a music producer including creating platforms for musicians and artists who are persecuted or discriminated against for their creative expression.

She moved to the USA where she worked as a documentary filmmaker.

=== Documentary film-making in the USA and her return to Norway ===
In 2025, after eight years living in the USA, Khan moved back to Norway with her two young daughters. Her US residency permit was an O-1 visa, a category for "Individuals with Extraordinary Ability or Achievement," but when time came to renew the visa in 2025 her lawyers recommended against it, as they feared she would be targeted and possibly detained by ICE due to Trump's immigration policies and her criticism of his policies in multiple award-winning documentaries.

== Discography ==
=== Albums ===
- 1992: I alt slags lys
- 1996: Deepika
- 2007: Ataraxis

=== Singles ===
- 1995: "Get Off My Back"
- 1995: "History"
- 1995: "Color of My Dreams"
- 2005: "Plan of My Own" / "I Saw You" - UK peak: #37

=== Compilation albums ===
Year	Title	Notes
2010	Listen to the Banned	It features banned, persecuted and imprisoned artists from Africa, the Middle East and Asia. As well as receiving critical acclaim, the album spent months on the World Music Charts Europe peaking at number six. Amnesty International in the UK is supporting Listen to the Banned by making the album available through their website end of 2010.
2012	Nordic Woman	It features female artists of traditional Nordic music forms from Norway, Sweden, Denmark, Finland and Iceland. The first release from Deeyah's WOMAN music album series. Produced by Deeyah.
2013	Echoes of Indus	CD features Pakistani sitarist Ashraf Sharif Khan Poonchwala
2013	Iranian Woman	It features Iranian female artists

== Filmmaking ==
Deeyah made her directorial debut with the documentary Banaz A Love Story. The film received its UK premiere at the Raindance Film Festival in London September 2012. This was Deeyah's first film as a director and producer. It has won critical acclaim and international awards, including the 2013 Emmy award for best international documentary film. The film is being used to train British police about honor killings.

=== Filmography ===
Film
Year	Title	Functioned as	Note	Type
2012	Banaz: A Love Story	Director and Producer	Won a Peabody Award (2013). Won Emmy Award for "Best International Documentary" Film (2013). Won Bergen International Film Festival award for "Best Norwegian Documentary" (2013). Royal Television Society nomination for Best "Current Affairs" Documentary.	Documentary
2015	Jihad: A Story of the Others	Director and Producer	Won New York International Independent Film and Video Festival award as "Best Short Documentary". Received Arts Council Norway "Human Rights Award" for the documentary Jihad. Nomination for Grierson Awards. Nomination for British Academy Film Awards in Best "Current Affairs" Documentary. Nomination for the 56th Golden Nymph Award in "Current Affair's Documentary" at Monte-Carlo Television Festival. Nomination for Creative Diversity Network Awards in "Best Current Affairs Program" category.	Documentary
2016	Islam's Non-Believers	Director and Producer	Nomination for Asian Media Awards in the "Best Investigation" category for 2017.	Documentary
2017	White Right: Meeting The Enemy	Director and Producer	Won Emmy Award in the "Current Affairs" category. Won Royal Television Society in "Director: Documentary/Factual & Non Drama" category. Won Rory Peck Award for "Current Affairs" category. Won PeaceJam "Special Jury" award. Won WFTV Awards in "The BBC News and Factual Award" category. Won APA Film Festival Best Short Film Award category. Won Asian Media Awards for "Best investigation" category. Won Jury award at the Bellingham Human Rights Film Festival. Nomination for 2018 British Academy Film Awards in "Best Current Affairs" Documentary. Nomination for Frontline Club Awards in "Broadcasting" category.	Documentary
2020	America’s War On Abortion	Director and Producer	Won British Academy Film Awards for best current affairs documentary. Won Edinburgh International Television Festival award in best documentary category. Nomination for AIB Media Excellence Awards in Best International Affairs Documentary category. Nomination for Royal Television Society in director category. Nominated for British Journalism Awards in Foreign Affairs Journalism category	Documentary
2020	Muslim In Trump’s America	Director and Producer	Won a Peabody Award in News category. Nominated for British Journalism Awards in Foreign Affairs Journalism category Nominated for Broadcast Awards in Best News/Current Affairs category 2022.	Documentary
2022	Behind the Rage: America’s Domestic Violence	Director and Producer	Premiere on 17 October 2022	Documentary
2025	America's Veterans: The War Within	Director and Producer	Nominated for Broadcast Awards in the Best Current Affairs Programme category.	Documentary

== Fuuse ==
Deeyah is founder and CEO of Fuuse which is a multi-platform independent media company based in Oslo and London. Started in 2010, Fuuse is a production company that tells the stories of marginalized people, particularly highlighting the voices of women, people from minorities, and third culture kids. Fuuse creates documentary films and produces an online magazine which promotes the diverse voices of women of Muslim heritage called Sister-hood and the company produces live events and conferences in the intersection of art and activism.

== Views and activism ==
Deeyah is an outspoken activist for human rights, freedom of expression, peace and equality. Deeyah actively addresses women’s rights. Deeyah has written opinion pieces for publications including The Guardian, Huffington Post, The Mirror, The Times, ITV and VG. Khan is a strong critic of far-right politics and campaigns extensively against racism and anti-immigration policies. She is also known for challenging the growing radicalization and extremism within Muslim communities. Deeyah conceived of and founded Sister-hood in 2007, whose aim is to provide an outlet of artistic expression for young aspiring Muslim female artists in different disciplines. Sister-hood was relaunched in 2016 as a global online magazine and live events platform promoting the voices of women of Muslim heritage.

Khan founded Memini in early 2011, a global digital initiative to promote remembrance of victims of honour killings worldwide. Memini was given a True Honour award by UK charity Iranian and Kurdish Women's Rights Organisation along with several other UK campaigners.

In February 2012, Khan founded Honour Based Violence Awareness network with Joanne Payton of Cardiff University (HBVA), a digital resource centre working to advance understanding and awareness of Honour Killings and Honour Based Violence through research, training and information.

In 2016, Deeyah delivered a TED talk titled: "What We Don’t Know About Europe’s Muslim Kids and Why We Should Care". She shares her experiences of being the child of an Afghan mother and Pakistani father raised in Norway, stuck between her family's community and her country. In her emotional talk she unearths the rejection and isolation felt by many Muslim kids growing up in the West – and the deadly consequences of not embracing youth before extremist groups do.

== Awards, nominations, and honors ==
- 1996: Received an Honor Award from the Scheiblers legat for being a cultural bridge, creating understanding and tolerance through her musical and artistic contributions.
- 2009: Recipient, with Cont Mhlanga and Belarus Free Theatre, of the international Freedom to Create Prize.
- 2012: Given the Ossietzky Award, Norwegian PEN´s prize for outstanding achievements within the field of freedom of expression.
- 2013: Shortlisted for the Liberty Human Rights Arts Award.
- 2015: Awarded Plan Jentepris (given each 11 October, the International Day of the Girl Child) by its Norwegian branch.
- 2015: Named a Young Global Leader in the field of the arts.
- 2015: Named a Ford Foundation Visiting Fellow for the program, The Art of Change.
- 2015: Received the University of Oslo’s Human Rights Award for championing women's rights and freedom of expression through her art and activism.
- 2016: Given Gunnar Sønsteby Prize. The award had been established in the memory of Gunnar Sønsteby and to honour persons and organisations which courageously defend the fundamental values of democracy and help ensure the freedom and independence of Norway.
- 2016: Received the Peer Gynt Prize (given to people and institutions who have highlighted Norway internationally).
- 2016: Received a Telenor Culture Award for artistic achievements which touch on some of the most important themes of the present, including women`s rights, freedom of expression, and fundamental values.
- 2016: Appointed Goodwill Ambassador for UNESCO for artistic freedom and creativity, making her both the first Scandinavian to have been so appointed and the first goodwill ambassador for artistic freedom and creativity.
- 2017: Appointed a member of the governing body of Arts Council Norway, to sit from 2018 through 2021.
- 2018: Received an honorary doctorate from Emerson College for her achievements as a documentary film-maker.
- 2020: Received Fritt Ord Award for making "fearless and methodically innovative documentaries about extremism".
- 2020: Won Schwarzkopf Europe Award.
- 2021:Named the Earls of Lade 2021.
- 2022: Received Anders Jahre's Culture Award which is established and named after Anders Jahre.
- 2023:Named a finalist for Global Pluralism Award for 2023.
- 2024: Received Blanche Majors forsoningspris (Blanche Major's Reconciliation Award). This award is given to people or organizations who, on various levels, engage in reconciliation and reconciliation processes.
- 2026: Received Arts Council Norway Honorary Award.The prize is awarded annually to a person who has made a significant contribution to Norwegian art and culture.
