= Fuuse =

Music, arts and film production company

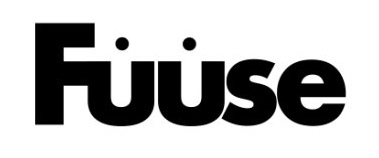
- Industry: Film, Media, Music
- Founded: October 2010
- Founder: Deeyah Khan
- Headquarters: Oslo

Fuuse is an independent music, arts and film production company founded by Norwegian artist, (film and music maker) Deeyah Khan. Fuuse is based in Norway and specialises in creating music and film projects rooted in art, culture and activism to encourage dialogue around social and political issues.

The debut film created and produced by Fuuse was the 2012 documentary Banaz A Love Story.

Fuuse consists of film, music and live event activities made through Fuuse Mousiqi, Fuuse Films and Fuuse Live.

== Advocacies ==
Fuuse has core advocacies: human rights, gender equality, freedom of expression, love, social justice and peace. Each Fuuse project highlights a specific advocacy.

== Fuuse Mosiqi ==
Fuuse Mosiqi is the music division of Fuuse and works for cultural exchange through music. Its two ongoing core music series are WOMAN, which presents the voices and music of women artists in celebration of world music. The second is the FUUSE MOUSIQI Traditional Music Heritage Preservation series.

=== CDs released through Fuuse Mosiqi ===
- Nordic Woman.
- Iranian Woman
- Echoes Of Indus (Ashraf Sharif Khan Poonchwala)

== Fuuse films ==
- 2020: Muslim in Trump’s America
- 2020: America's War on Abortion
- 2017: White Right: Meeting The Enemy
- 2016: Islam's Non-Believers
- 2015: Jihad: A Story of the Others
- 2012: Banaz: A Love Story

== Fuuse Live ==
- Fuuse presents World Woman
- Banaz A Love Story screening and conversation event in Oslo hosted in collaboration with Fritt Ord January 2013.
- Banaz A Love Story screening and conversation event in London hosted in collaboration with Free Word Centre and Article19 March 2013.
