= British Academy Television Craft Award for Best Original Music =

Award for technical achievements in TV

British Academy Television Craft Award
- Country: United Kingdom
- Presented by: British Academy of Film and Television Arts
- First award: 1981
- Currently held by: Fiction: Tom Rowlands for Mussolini: Son of the Century (2026); Factual: Jessica Dannheisser for The Last Musician of Auschwitz (2026)
- Website: http://www.bafta.org/

The British Academy Television Craft Award for Best Original Music is one of the categories presented by the British Academy of Film and Television Arts (BAFTA) within the British Academy Television Craft Awards, the craft awards were established in 2000 with their own, separate ceremony as a way to spotlight technical achievements, without being overshadowed by the main production categories.

It was first awarded in 1981, according to the BAFTA website, a programme will be eligible to this category if "more than 50% of its music is original composition created specifically for it."

In 2023, the category was split into two categories: Original Music: Fiction and Original Music: Factual.

== Winners and nominees ==
=== 1980s ===
Year	Title	Recipient(s)
1981	The Merchant of Venice; Fair Stood The Wind For France; Love Story; Oppenheimer; Hollywood; The Misanthrope; The Sailor's Return; The Old Curiosity Shop	Carl Davis
1981	Enemy at the Door; Pride and Prejudice	Wilfred Josephs
1981	Fox (Incidental); Shoestring; Bloody Kids	George Fenton
1981	Flickers; Shelley; Tales Of The Unexpected	Ron Grainer
1982	Bergerac; Going Gently; The History Man; BBC News Theme	George Fenton
1982	Brideshead Revisited	Geoffrey Burgon
1982	Winston Churchill: The Wilderness Years	Carl Davis
1982	The Flame Trees of Thika	Ken Howard, Alan Blaikely
1983	Smiley's People; I Remember Nelson; The Woman in White	Patrick Gowers
1983	Harry's Game	Clannad
1983	The Flight of the Condor	Inti-Illimani
1983	A Voyage Round My Father; Mona; The Bell	Marc Wilkinson
1984	An Englishman Abroad; Saigon: Year of the Cat; Loving Walter; Walter and June; The Ghost Writer; Breakfast Time; Natural World; Village Earth	George Fenton
1984	The Aerodrome; Macbeth; The Spice Of Life; The Tale Of Beatrix Potter; Unknown Chaplin	Carl Davis
1984	Auf Wiedersehen, Pet	David Mackay
1984	Reilly, Ace of Spies	Harry Rabinowitz
1985	Robin of Sherwood	Clannad
1985	The Ebony Tower	Richard Rodney Bennett
1985	The Far Pavilions	Carl Davis
1985	The Jewel in the Crown	George Fenton
1986	Edge of Darkness	Eric Clapton, Michael Kamen
1986	Kingdom of the Ice Bear	Terry Oldfield
1986	Silas Marner	Carl Davis
1986	Tender is the Night	Richard Rodney Bennett
1987	The Monocled Mutineer	George Fenton
1987	Fire and Ice	Carl Davis
1987	Hotel Du Lac	Carl Davis
1987	The Insurance Man	Ilona Sekacz
1987	The Life and Loves of a She-Devil	Peter Filleul
1987	Lost Empires	Derek Hilton
1988	Porterhouse Blue	Christopher Gunning, Rick Lloyd
1988	The Beiderbecke Tapes	Frank Ricotti
1988	Fortunes of War	Richard Holmes
1988	A Perfect Spy	Michael Storey
1989	The Beiderbecke Connection	Frank Ricotti
1989	Talking Heads	George Fenton
1989	Tumbledown	Richard Hartley
1989	A Very British Coup	John Keane

=== 1990s ===
Year	Title	Recipient(s)	Broadcaster
1990	Agatha Christie's Poirot	Christopher Gunning	ITV
1990	Around The World in 80 Days	Paddy Kingsland	BBC One
1990	Traffik	Tim Souster	Channel 4
1990	The Woman in Black	Rachel Portman	ITV
1991	The Green Man	Tim Souster	BBC One
1991	Oranges Are Not the Only Fruit	Rachel Portman	BBC Two
1991	House of Cards	Jim Parker	BBC One
1991	The Trials of Life	George Fenton	BBC One
1992	G.B.H.	Richard Harvey, Elvis Costello	Channel 4
1992	Agatha Christie's Poirot	Christopher Gunning	ITV
1992	Inspector Morse	Barrington Pheloung	ITV
1992	Prime Suspect	Stephen Warbeck	ITV
1993	Frankie's House	Jeff Beck, Jed Leiber	ITV
1993	The Big Battalions	Christopher Gunning	Channel 4
1993	Love Hurts	Alan Hawkshaw	BBC One
1993	Jeeves and Wooster	Anne Dudley	ITV
1994	To Play the King	Jim Parker	BBC
1994	The Buddha of Suburbia	David Bowie	BBC Two
1994	Mr Wroe’s Virgins	Roger and Brian Eno	BBC Two
1994	Life in the Freezer	George Fenton	BBC One
1995	Middlemarch	Stanley Myers, Christopher Gunning	BBC Two
1995	Crocodile Shoes	Tony McAnaney, Jimmy Nail, Paddy McAloon	BBC One
1995	Martin Chuzzlewit	Geoffrey Burgon	BBC Two
1995	Skallagrigg	Stephen Warbeck	BBC Two
1996	Persuasion	Jeremy Sams	BBC Two
1996	Cracker	Rick Wentworth	ITV
1996	Signs and Wonders	Daemion Barry	BBC Two
1996	The Hanging Gale	Shaun Davey	BBC One
1997	The Fortunes and Misfortunes of Moll Flanders	Jim Parker	ITV
1997	Cruel Train	Nick Bicat	BBC Two
1997	Ballykissangel	Shaun Davey	BBC One
1997	The Crow Road	Colin Towns	BBC Scotland
1998	Tom Jones	Jim Parker	BBC One
1998	Holding On	Nick Bicat	BBC Two
1998	The Lakes	Simon Boswell	BBC One
1998	Trial & Retribution	Evelyn Glennie	ITV
1999	A Rather English Marriage	Jim Parker	BBC Two
1999	Vanity Fair	Murray Gold	BBC One
1999	Our Mutual Friend	Adrian Johnston	BBC Two
1999	Hornblower: The Even Chance	John Keane	ITV

=== 2000s ===
Year	Title	Recipient(s)	Broadcaster
2000	Walking with Dinosaurs	Ben Bartlett	BBC One
2000	Queer as Folk	Murray Gold	Channel 4
2000	Oliver Twist	Paul Pritchard, Elvis Costello	ITV
2000	Cold Feet	Mark Russell	ITV
2001	Longitude	Geoffrey Burgon	Channel 4
2001	War Behind the Wire	Daemion Barry	BBC Two
2001	Gormenghast	Richard Rodney Bennett	BBC Two
2001	Elizabeth	Andy Price	Channel 4
2002	The Blue Planet	George Fenton	BBC One
2002	Perfect Strangers	Adrian Johnston	BBC Two
2002	The Way We Live Now	Nicholas Hooper	BBC One
2002	The Lost World	Rob Lane	BBC One
2003	The Forsyte Saga	Geoffrey Burgon	ITV
2003	The Gathering Storm	Howard Goodall	BBC Two
2003	Tipping the Velvet	Adrian Johnston, Terry Davies	BBC
2003	Spooks	Jennie Muskett	BBC One
2004	The Young Visiters	Nicholas Hooper	BBC One
2004	The Forsyte Saga	Geoffrey Burgon	ITV
2004	State of Play	Nicholas Hooper	BBC One
2004	The Lost Prince	Adrian Johnston	BBC One
2005	Sex Traffic	Jonathan Goldsmith	Channel 4
2005	Himalaya with Michael Palin	David Hartley, Andre Jacquemin, Dave Howman	BBC One
2005	Spooks	Jennie Muskett, Sheridan Tongue	BBC One
2005	Green Wing	Jonathan Whitehead	Channel 4
2006	Elizabeth I	Rob Lane	Channel 4
2006	Casanova	Murray Gold	BBC Three
2006	The Girl in the Café	Nicholas Hooper	BBC One
2006	The Government Inspector	Jocelyn Pook	Channel 4
2007	Prime Suspect: The Final Act	Nicholas Hooper	ITV
2007	Planet Earth	George Fenton	BBC One
2007	Tsunami: The Aftermath	Alex Heffes	BBC One
2007	Jane Eyre	Rob Lane	BBC One
2008	Capturing Mary	Adrian Johnston	BBC Two
2008	Boy A	Paddy Cunneen	Channel 4
2008	Cranford	Carl Davis	BBC One
2008	Doctor Who	Murray Gold	BBC One
2009	Wallander	Martin Phipps	BBC One
2009	Spooks	Paul Leonard-Morgan	BBC One
2009	Little Dorrit	John Lunn	BBC One
2009	Sense and Sensibility	Martin Phipps	BBC One

=== 2010s ===
Year	Title	Recipient(s)	Broadcaster
2010	Small Island	Martin Phipps	BBC One
2010	Red Riding 1974	Adrian Johnston	Channel 4
2010	Moses Jones	Craig Pruess	BBC Two
2010	Being Human	Richard Wells	BBC Three
2011	Any Human Heart	Dan Jones	Channel 4
2011	Sherlock: A Study in Pink	David Arnold, Michael Price	BBC One
2011	Terry Pratchett's Going Postal	John Lunn	Sky 1
2011	Misfits	Vince Pope	E4
2012	Top Boy	Brian Eno	Channel 4
2012	Downton Abbey	John Lunn	ITV
2012	Frozen Planet	George Fenton	BBC One
2012	Great Expectations	Martin Phipps	BBC One
2013	Henry IV (The Hollow Crown)	Stephen Warbeck	BBC Two
2013	Doctor Who (for "Asylum of the Daleks")	Murray Gold	BBC One
2013	The Hour	Kevin Sargent	BBC Two
2013	The Snowman and the Snowdog	Ilan Eshkeri, Andy Burrows	Channel 4
2014	Broadchurch	Ólafur Arnalds	ITV
2014	Luther	Paul Englishby	BBC One
2014	Peaky Blinders	Martin Phipps	BBC Two
2014	Top of the Lake	Mark Bradshaw	BBC Two
2015	Penny Dreadful	Abel Korzeniowski	Sky Atlantic
2015	Downton Abbey	John Lunn	ITV
2015	The Honourable Woman	Martin Phipps	BBC Two
2015	Life and Death Row (for "Execution")	Richard Spiller	BBC Three
2016	The Hunt	Steven Price	BBC One
2016	Thunderbirds Are Go	Ben Foster, Nick Foster	ITV
2016	Broadchurch	Ólafur Arnalds	ITV
2016	Poldark	Anne Dudley	BBC One
2017	National Treasure	Cristobal Tapia de Veer	Channel 4
2017	Poldark	Anne Dudley	BBC One
2017	Planet Earth II	Hans Zimmer, Jacob Shea, Jasha Klebe	BBC One
2017	War & Peace	Martin Phipps	BBC One
2018	King Charles III	Jocelyn Pook	BBC Two
2018	Taboo	Max Richter	BBC One
2018	Howards End	Nico Muhly	BBC One
2018	Born to be Free: Saving Russia's Whales	Katya Mihailova	Channel 4
2019	Killing Eve	David Holmes, Keefus Ciancia	BBC One
2019	The Little Drummer Girl	Cho Young-Wuk	BBC One
2019	A Very English Scandal	Murray Gold	BBC One
2019	Patrick Melrose	Hauschka	Sky Atlantic

=== 2020s ===
Year	Title	Recipient(s)	Broadcaster
2020	Chernobyl	Hildur Guðnadóttir	Sky Atlantic
2020	Killing Eve	David Holmes, Keefus Ciancia	BBC One
2020	Giri/Haji	Adrian Johnston	BBC Two
2020	War in the Blood	Andrew Phillips	BBC Two
2021	Roadkill	Harry Escott	BBC One
2021	The Third Day (for "Sunday – The Ghost")	Cristobal Tapia de Veer	Sky Atlantic
2021	Baghdad Central	H. Scott Salinas	Channel 4
2021	The Crown	Martin Phipps	Netflix
2022	Landscapers	Arthur Sharpe	Sky Atlantic
2022	Line of Duty	Carly Paradis	BBC One
2022	The Outsiders	Jonathan "Elevated" Olorunfemi	YouTube
2022	Loki	Natalie Holt	Disney+

Best Original Music - Fiction

Year	Title	Recipient(s)	Broadcaster
2023	Mood	Nicôle Lecky, Bryan Senti, Kwame KZ Kwei-Armah Jr.	BBC Three
2023	The English	Federico Jusid	BBC Two
2023	Slow Horses	Daniel Pemberton, Mick Jagger	Apple TV+
2023	The Responder	Matthew Herbert	BBC One
2024	Silo	Atli Örvarsson	Apple TV+
2024	Heartstopper	Adiescar Chase	Netflix
2024	Nolly	Blair Mowat	ITVX
2024	Loki	Natalie Holt	Disney+
2025	Bad Sisters	Tim Phillips, PJ Harvey	Apple TV+
2025	Rivals	Natalie Holt, Jack Halama	Disney+
2025	Slow Horses	Daniel Pemberton, Toydrum	Apple TV+
2025	Until I Kill You	Carly Paradis	ITV1
2026	Mussolini: Son of the Century	Tom Rowlands	Sky Atlantic
2026	The Death of Bunny Munro	Nick Cave, Warren Ellis	Sky Atlantic
2026	Black Mirror (for "Hotel Reverie")	Ariel Marx	Netflix
2026	A Thousand Blows	Federico Jusid	Disney+

Best Original Music - Factual

Year	Title	Recipient(s)	Broadcaster
2023	Jimmy Savile: A British Horror Story	Jessica Jones	Netflix
2023	House of Maxwell	Andrew Phillips	BBC Two
2023	The Elon Musk Show	Max de Wardener	BBC Two
2023	The Tinder Swindler	Jessica Jones	Netflix
2024	Once Upon a Time in Northern Ireland	Simon Russell	BBC Two
2024	Wild Isles	George Fenton	BBC One
2024	A Time to Die	Simon Rogers	ITV
2024	Otto Baxter: Not a F***ing Horror Story	Ed Harcourt	Sky Documentaries
2025	Rage Against the Regime: Iran	Noor Khaleghi	BBC Two
2025	Exposure: "Israel & Gaza: Into the Abyss"	Tandis Jenhudson	ITV1
2025	American Nightmare	Jessica Jones	Netflix
2025	Tiger	Nitin Sawhney	Disney+
2026	The Last Musician of Auschwitz	Jessica Dannheisser	BBC Two
2026	Moon: Nature's Secret Force	Sophy Purnell	Sky Nature
2026	Pangolin: Kulu's Journey	Anne Nikitin	Netflix
2026	The Sycamore Gap Mystery	Louis Dodd, Matthew Sanchez	Channel 4

== See also ==
- Primetime Emmy Award for Outstanding Music Composition for a Documentary Series or Special
- Primetime Emmy Award for Outstanding Music Composition for a Limited Series, Movie, or Special
- Primetime Emmy Award for Outstanding Music Composition for a Series
