= British Academy Television Craft Award for Best Editing: Factual =

Award for technical achievements in TV

British Academy Television Craft Award
- Country: United Kingdom
- Presented by: British Academy of Film and Television Arts
- First award: 1992
- Currently held by: Mel Quigley & Andy Kemp for Gaza: Doctors Under Attack (2026)
- Website: http://www.bafta.org/

The British Academy Television Craft Award for Best Editing: Factual is one of the categories presented by the British Academy of Film and Television Arts (BAFTA) within the British Academy Television Craft Awards, the craft awards were established in 2000 with their own, separate ceremony as a way to spotlight technical achievements, without being overshadowed by the main production categories.

Before splitting into two categories for editing in 1992, Best Editing: Factual and Best Editing: Fiction (presented from 1992 to 1994 as Best Film or Video Editor – Factual and Best Film or Video Editor – Fiction respectively), two categories were presented to recognize editing in television programming:

- From 1978 to 1991 Best VTR Editor was presented.
- From 1978 to 1991 Best Film Editor was presented.

== Winners and nominees ==
=== 1990s ===
Best Film or Video Editor - Factual

Year	Recipient(s)	Title
1992	Barry Spink	Banned: Children of Chernobyl
1992	Clothes Show Editing Team	The Clothes Show
1992	Jonathan Morris	Viewpoint '91: Hellfighters of Kuwait
1992	Ian Pitch	The South Bank Show: Jose Carreras - A Life Story
1993	Alan Lygo	Elizabeth R
1993	Malcolm Daniel	Omnibus: Eye of the Storm - Ridley Scott
1993	Jim Latham	Fire in the Blood: Breaking Free
1993	Graham Shrimpton	True Stories: Petersburg!
1994	Alan Lygo	Timewatch: The Stolen Child
1994	Edward Roberts	The Ark
1994	Graham Shrimpton	True Stories: The Unforgiving
1994	Liz Thoyts, Alan Hoida, Martin Elsbury	Life in the Freezer

Best Editing: Factual

Year	Title	Recipient(s)
1995	Cutting Edge: The Club	Richard Cox
1995	From A to B: Tales of Modern Motoring	Paul Binns
1995	Torvill and Dean: Facing The Music	Jim Latham
1995	Hollywood Kids	Nigel Timperley
1996	True Stories: The Betrayed	Graham Shrimpton
1996	The Private Life of Plants	Tim Coope, Jo Payne, Martin Elsbury
1996	The Beatles Anthology	Andy Matthews
1996	HMS Brilliant	Andy Willsmore, Tony Heavan
1997	The System	Edward Roberts and Editing Team
1997	Making Babies	Howard Billingham
1997	The House	Jim Latham, Sean Mackenzie
1997	Great Ormond Street	Brian Tagg
1998	The Nazis: A Warning from History	Alan Lygo, James Hay
1998	Under the Sun: The Hunt	Erik Disselhoff, Peter Simpson
1998	Airport	Mike Flynn, Dave Monk, Edward Bazalgette
1998	Hotel	Guye Henderson, Richard Cox, John Thomas
1999	Lockerbie: A Night Remembered	Brian Tagg
1999	Arena: The Brian Epstein Story	Roy Deverell, Guy Crossman
1999	Arena: The Noel Coward Trilogy	David Kitson
1999	Bring Me Sunshine: The Heart and Soul of Eric Morecambe (Omnibus)	Andrew Quigley

=== 2000s ===
Year	Title	Episode	Recipient(s)	Broadcaster
2000	Inside Story: Child of the Death Camps		Malcolm Daniel	BBC One
2000	Malcolm and Barbara: A Love Story		Kim Horton	ITV
2000	The Second World War in Colour		Steve Moore	ITV
2000	Shanghai Vice		Nikki Oldroyd, David Dickie	Channel 4
2001	Omnibus	"Dudley Moore – After the Laughter"	Andrew Fegen	BBC Two
2001	Britain at War on Colour		Stephen Moore	ITV
2001	I Love 1970’s	"1974"	Craig Stobbart	BBC Two
2001	A History of Britain by Simon Schama			BBC One
2002	The Show Must Go On		Anna Ksiezopolska	BBC Two
2002	The Blue Planet		Jo Payne, Tim Coope, Alan Hoida, Martin Elsbury	BBC One
2002	Kumbh Mela: The Greatest Show On Earth			BBC Two
2002	Joined: The World of Siamese Twins		Paul Van Dyck	Channel 4
2003	SAS Embassy Siege		Peter Norrey	BBC Two
2003	The Life of Mammals			BBC One
2003	Edwardian Country House		Martin Johnson, Joanna Lincoln	Channel 4
2003	Faking It		Mark Knowles	Channel 4
2004	Arena	"The Many Lives of Richard Attenborough"	Sean Mackenzie	BBC Two
2004	Ancient Egyptians	"The Battle of Megiddo"	Mark Gravil	Channel 4
2004	Days that Shook the World	"Hiroshima"	Chris King	BBC Two
2004	George Orwell: A Life in Pictures		Steve Stevenson	BBC Two
2005	The Boy Whose Skin Fell Off		Nick Fenton	Channel 4
2005	Dunkirk		Oliver Huddleston	BBC Two
2005	Death in Gaza		Misha Manson-Smith	Channel 4
2005	D-Day		Peter Parnham	BBC One
2006	The Year London Blew Up: 1974		Paul Binns	Channel 4
2006	Born in the USSR: 21 Up		Kim Horton	ITV
2006	49 Up		Kim Horton	ITV
2006	Jamie's School Dinners		Sunshine Jackson	Channel 4
2007	Rain in My Heart		Dave King	BBC Two
2007	Breaking Up with The Joneses		Gregor Lyon	Channel 4
2007	9/11: The Twin Towers		Peter Parnham	BBC One
2007	Nuremberg: Nazis on Trial		Ben Giles	BBC Two
2008	Parallel Worlds, Parallel Lives		Folko Boermans	BBC Four
2008	The Apprentice		Tris Harris	BBC One
2008	The Seven Sins of England		Ollie Huddlestone, Michael Harrowes	Channel 4
2008	Dispatches	"China’s Stolen Children (Special)"	Jezza Neumann, Brian Woods, Reg Clarke	Channel 4
2009	The Fallen		Joby Gee	BBC Two
2009	The Family		Ben Brown, Marc Davies	Channel 4
2009	A Boy Called Alex		Ben Stark	Channel 4
2009	True Stories	"Thriller in Manila"	Nick Packer	More4

=== 2010s ===
Year	Title	Episode	Recipient(s)	Broadcaster
2010	The Secret Life of the Berlin Wall		Gregor Lyon	BBC Two
2010	Life	"Birds"	Jo Payne	BBC One
2010	Dispatches	"The Slumdog Children of Mumbai"	Jay Taylor	Channel 4
2010	Top Gear			BBC Two
2011	Human Planet	"Arctic"	Jason Savage	BBC One
2011	Dispatches	"The Battle for Haiti"	Peter Haddon	Channel 4
2011	Concorde's Last Flight		Peter Norrey	Channel 4
2011	Wonders of the Solar System	"Empire of the Sun"	Darren Jonusas	BBC Two
2011	David Attenborough's First Life		Peter Miller	BBC Two
2012	Frozen Planet	"To the Ends of the Earth"	Nigel Buck, Andy Netley, Dave Pearce	BBC One
2012	Agony and Ecstasy: A Year with English National Ballet		Ian Davies	BBC Four
2012	Japan's Tsunami Caught on Camera		Sean Mackenzie	Channel 4
2012	Terry Pratchett: Choosing to Die		Gary Scott	BBC Two
2013	Amish: A Secret Life		Sean Mackenzie	BBC Two
2013	The Secret History of Our Streets	"Portland Road"	Michael Harrowes	BBC Two
2013	7/7 One Day in London		Rupert Houseman	BBC Two
2013	Britain in a Day		Peter Christelis	BBC Two
2014	Educating Yorkshire	"Episode One"	Mark Towns	Channel 4
2014	Arena	"The National Theatre (Part One - The Dream)"	Joanna Crickmay	BBC Four
2014	Top Gear		Craig Harbour, James Hart, Dan James	BBC Two
2014	David Bowie – Five Years		Ged Murphy	BBC Two
2015	Grayson Perry: Who Are You?		Jake Martin	Channel 4
2015	Tsunami: Survivors' Stories		Ben Stark	ITV
2015	24 Hours in Police Custody		Ben Brown	Channel 4
2015	Life and Death Row	"Execution"	Rupert Houseman	BBC Three
2016	The Murder Detectives		Ben Brown	Channel 4
2016	Great Barrier Reef with David Attenborough		Dominic Lester	BBC One
2016	Charlie Hebdo: Three Days That Shook Paris		James Clarkson Lyon	Channel 4
2016	My Son the Jihadi		Simon McMahon	Channel 4
2017	Hillsborough		Andy Worboys	BBC Two
2017	Planet Earth II	"Deserts"	Dave Pearce	BBC One
2017	Planet Earth II	"Islands"	Matt Meech	BBC One
2017	Exodus: Our Journey to Europe		Simon Sykes, Nick Fenton, Sunshine Jackson	BBC Two
2018	Chris Packham: Asperger's and Me		Will Grayburn	BBC Two
2018	Louis Theroux: Dark States	"Heroin Town"	Anna Price	BBC Two
2018	David Bowie: The Last Five Years		Ged Murphy	BBC One
2018	Blue Planet II	"One Ocean"	Matt Meech	BBC One
2018	Blue Planet II	"The Deep"	Nigel Buck	BBC One
2019	Bros: After the Screaming Stops		Will Gilbey	BBC Four
2019	Grenfell		Ben Brown	BBC One
2019	Drowning in Plastic		Matt Lowe	BBC One
2019	Louis Theroux: Altered States	"Choosing Death"	Emma Lysaght	BBC Two

=== 2020s ===
Year	Title	Episode	Recipient(s)	Broadcaster
2020	Don't F**k with Cats: Hunting an Internet Killer		Michael Harte	Netflix
2020	Untouchable: The Rise and Fall of Harvey Weinstein		Andy R Worboys	BBC Two
2020	Leaving Neverland		Jules Cornell	Channel 4
2020	63 Up		Kim Horton	ITV
2021	Lee Miller – A Life on the Front Line		Claire Guillon	BBC Two
2021	Putin: A Russian Spy Story		Adam Finch	Channel 4
2021	Once Upon a Time in Iraq	"Fallujah"	Anna Price	BBC Two
2021	Once Upon a Time in Iraq	"Insurgency"	Will Grayburn	BBC Two
2022	9/11: Inside the President's War Room		Danny Collins, Mark Hammill	Apple TV+/BBC One
2022	Grenfell: The Untold Story		Emma Lysaght	Channel 4
2022	Pandemic 2020		Anna Price	BBC Two
2022	Mortimer & Whitehouse: Gone Fishing		Doug Bryson	BBC Two
2023	Chernobyl: The Lost Tapes		Rupert Houseman	Sky Documentaries
2023	Exposure	"Afghanistan: No Country for Women"	Mark Summers	ITV
2023	Jimmy Savile: A British Horror Story		Ben Brown	Netflix
2023	Mortimer & Whitehouse: Gone Fishing		Doug Bryson	BBC Two
2024	Once Upon a Time in Northern Ireland			BBC Two
2024	Lockerbie		Charlie Hawryliw	Sky Documentaries
2024	Formula 1: Drive to Survive			Netflix
2024	Beckham		Michael Harte	Netflix
2025	Storyville	"Life and Death in Gaza"	Sarah Keeling	BBC Two
2025	Apollo 13: Survival		Otto Burnham	Netflix
2025	Ukraine: Enemy in the Woods		Kate Spankie	BBC Two
2025	Miners' Strike 1984: The Battle for Britain		Sean Mackenzie, Chris Nicholls	Channel 4
2026	Gaza: Doctors Under Attack		Mel Quigley, Andy Kemp	Channel 4
2026	Attack on London: Hunting the 7/7 Bombers		Jennifer Asheitu Hampson	Netflix
2026	Grenfell: Uncovered		Samuel R. Santana	Netflix
2026	Louis Theroux: The Settlers		Paul Hammacott	BBC Two

- Note: The series that don't have recipients on the tables had Editing Team credited as recipients for the award or nomination.

== See also ==
- Primetime Emmy Award for Outstanding Picture Editing for a Nonfiction Program
