= British Academy Television Craft Award for Best Director: Factual =

Award for technical achievements in TV

British Academy Television Craft Award
- Country: United Kingdom
- Presented by: British Academy of Film and Television Arts
- First award: 2008
- Currently held by: Rob Coldstream for Vietnam: The War That Changed America (2026)
- Website: http://www.bafta.org/

The British Academy Television Craft Award for Best Director: Factual is one of the categories presented by the British Academy of Film and Television Arts (BAFTA) within the British Academy Television Craft Awards, the craft awards were established in 2000 with their own, separate ceremony as a way to spotlight technical achievements, without being overshadowed by the main production categories.

In 2006 and 2007 there was only on category for directors but in 2008 the category was split in three separate categories to recognize directing for different programming, first creating Best Director: Factual and Best Director: Fiction and then in 2011 Best Director: Multi-Camera.

== Winners and nominees ==
=== 2000s ===
Best Director

Year	Recipient(s)	Title	Broadcaster
2006	Brian Percival	Much Ado About Nothing	BBC One
2006	Simon Cellan Jones	The Queen's Sister	Channel 4
2006	Joe Ahearne	Doctor Who	BBC One
2006	Justin Chadwick	Bleak House	BBC One
2007	Edmund Coulthard	Soundproof	BBC Two
2007	Tom Hooper	Longford	Channel 4
2007	Adrian Shergold	Low Winter Sun	Channel 4
2007	Bharat Nalluri	Life on Mars	BBC One

Best Director: Factual

Year	Recipient(s)	Title	Episode	Broadcaster
2008	Jezza Neumann	Dispatches	"China’s Stolen Children"	Channel 4
2008	Annabel Gillings	Earth: The Power of the Planet	"Atmosphere"	BBC Two
2008	Livia Russell	Grand Designs		Channel 4
2008	Joseph Bullman	The Seven Sins of England		Channel 4
2009	Morgan Matthews	The Fallen		BBC Two
2009	Amanda Blue	Prescott: The Class System and Me		BBC Two
2009	Jonathan Smith	The Family		Channel 4
2009	Stephen Walker	A Boy Called Alex		Channel 4

=== 2010s ===
Year	Recipient(s)	Title	Episode	Broadcaster
2010	Patrick Forbes	The Force		Channel 4
2010	Annabel Gillings	How Earth Made Us	"Water"	BBC Two
2010	Nick Read	Dispatches	"The Slumdog Children of Mumbai"	Channel 4
2010	Dan Reed	Dispatches	"Terror in Mumbai"	Channel 4
2011	Dan Reed	Dispatches	"The Battle for Haiti"	Channel 4
2011	Gideon Bradshaw, Paul Olding	Wonders of the Solar System	"Empire of the Sun"	BBC Two
2011	Chris Holt	Wonders of the Solar System	"The Thin Blue Line"	BBC Two
2011	Nicolas Brown	Human Planet	"Arctic"	BBC One
2012	David Clews	Educating Essex		Channel 4
2012	Vanessa Berlowitz, Chadden Hunter, Kathryn Jeffs	Frozen Planet	"To the Ends of the Earth"	BBC One
2012	Sacha Mirzoeff	Protecting Our Children		BBC Two
2012	Charlie Russell	Terry Pratchett: Choosing to Die		BBC Two
2013	Ben Chanan	The Plot to Bring Down Britain's Planes		Channel 4
2013	Katharine English	Our War		BBC Three
2013	John Dower	Bradley Wiggins: A Year in Yellow		Sky Atlantic
2013	Ben Anthony	7/7 One Day in London		BBC Two
2014	Nick Holt	The Murder Trial		Channel 4
2014	Lee Phillips	Her Majesty's Prison Aylesbury		ITV
2014	David Brindley, Grace Reynolds	Educating Yorkshire		Channel 4
2014	Sara Hardy, Blue Ryan	The Unspeakable Crime: Rape		BBC One
2015	Dan Reed	The Paedophile Hunter		Channel 4
2015	Ben Anthony	Life and Death Row	"Execution"	BBC Three
2015	Alisa Pomeroy	24 Hours in Police Custody		Channel 4
2015	Neil Crombie	Grayson Perry: Who Are You?		Channel 4
2016	Dave Nath	The Murder Detectives		Channel 4
2016	Adam Jessel	Professor Green: Suicide and Me		BBC Three
2016	James Newton	The Detectives		BBC Two
2016	Ursula Macfarlane	Charlie Hebdo: Three Days That Shook Paris		Channel 4
2017	James Bluemel	Exodus: Our Journey to Europe		BBC Two
2017	Anna Hall	Behind Closed Doors		BBC One
2017	Daniel Gordon	Hillsborough		BBC Two
2017	Peter Beard	Gender Clinic: Kids on the Edge		Channel 4
2018	Charlie Russell	Chris Packham: Asperger's and Me		BBC Two
2018	Anna Hall	Catching a Killer	"The Search for Natalie Hemming"	Channel 4
2018	Will Yapp	The Real Full Monty		ITV
2018	Xavier Alford	Drugsland	"Heroin Love Story"	BBC Three
2019	Ben Anthony	Grenfell		BBC One
2019	David Soutar, Joe Pearlman	Bros: After the Screaming Stops		BBC Four
2019	James Rogan	Stephen: The Murder that Changed a Nation		BBC One
2019	Paddy Wivell	Prison		Channel 4

=== 2020s ===
Year	Recipient(s)	Title	Episode	Broadcaster
2020	Arthur Cary, Morgan Matthews, Katherine Anstey, Joby Gee	The Last Survivors		BBC Two
2020	Dan Reed	Leaving Neverland		Channel 4
2020	Mark Lewis	Don't F**k with Cats: Hunting an Internet Killer		Netflix
2020	Robin Barnwell	Exposure	"Undercover: Inside China's Digital Gulag"	ITV
2021	Teresa Griffiths	Lee Miller – A Life on the Front Line		BBC Two
2021	Xavier Alford	Storyville	"Locked in: Breaking the Silence"	BBC Four
2021	James Bluemel	Once Upon a Time in Iraq		BBC Two
2021	Deeyah Khan	Exposure	"America's War on Abortion"	ITV
2022	James Newton	Grenfell: The Untold Story		Channel 4
2022	Arthur Cary	Surviving 9/11		BBC Two
2022	Jamie Roberts	Four Hours at the Capitol		BBC Two
2022	James Newton	Baby Surgeons: Delivering Miracles		Channel 4
2023	Felicity Morris	The Tinder Swindler		Netflix
2023	James Jones	Chernobyl: The Lost Tapes		Sky Documentaries
2023	Emma Cooper	The Mystery of Marilyn Monroe: The Unheard Tapes		Netflix
2023	Sophie Robinson	My Dead Body		Channel 4
2024	Peter Beard, Bruce Fletcher	Otto Baxter: Not a F***ing Horror Story		Sky Documentaries
2024	James Bluemel	Once Upon a Time in Northern Ireland		BBC Two
2024	John Dower	Lockerbie		Sky Documentaries
2024	Gesbeen Mohammad	Exposure	"Inside Iran: The Fight for Freedom"	ITV
2025	Charlie Hamilton-James	Billy & Molly: An Otter Love Story		National Geographic
2025	Natasha Cox	Storyville	"Life and Death in Gaza"	BBC Two
2025	Colette Camden	Lucan		BBC Two
2025	Tom Green, Tommy Forbes	Me and the Voice in My Head		Channel 4
2026	Rob Coldstream	Vietnam: The War That Changed America		Apple TV
2026	Karim Shah	Gaza: Doctors Under Attack		Channel 4
2026	Olaide Sadiq	Grenfell: Uncovered		Netflix
2026	Benedict Sanderson	See No Evil		Channel 4

== See also ==
- Primetime Emmy Award for Outstanding Directing for a Documentary/Nonfiction Program
