= Dispatches (TV programme) =

British current affairs documentary TV programme

- Presented by: Various
- Country of origin: United Kingdom
- Original language: English
- No. of episodes: 843

Production
- Running time: 30–60 minutes (including adverts)

Original release
- Network: Channel 4
- Release: 30 October 1987 – present

Dispatches is a British current affairs documentary programme on Channel 4, first broadcast on 30 October 1987. The programme covers British society, politics, health, religion, international current affairs and the environment, and often involves a spy who infiltrates organisations under journalistic investigation.

== Awards ==
=== British Academy Television Awards ===
The British Academy Television Awards are presented in an award show hosted by the BAFTA. They have been awarded annually since 1955.

Year	Category	Nominee	Result	Ref.
1992	Best Factual Series	Dispatches	Nominated	
1996	Best Factual Series	Dispatches	Nominated	
1999	Best News and Current Affairs Journalism	David Monaghan, Deborah Davies, Graham Hall (for "Inside the Animal Liberation Front")	Nominated	
2002	Best Current Affairs	Beneath the Veil	Nominated	
2006	Best Current Affairs	Eamonn Matthews, Kevin Sim (for "Beslan")	Won	
2006	Best Current Affairs	Samir Shah, Dimitri Collingridge, James Brabazon (for "Iraq – The Reckoning")	Nominated	
2008	Best Current Affairs	Jezza Neumann, Sky Zeh, Brian Woods, Kate Blewett (for "China's Stolen Children")	Won	
2008	Best Current Affairs	Sean Langan, Julia Barron, Denman Rooke (for "Fighting the Taliban")	Nominated	
2009	Best Current Affairs	Mags Gavan, Joost Van Der Valk, Alice Keens-Soper, Paul Woolwich (for "Saving Africa's Witch Children")	Won	
2009	Best Current Affairs	Kate Blewett, Deborah Shipley, Brian Woods (for "Mum Loves Drugs, Not Me")	Nominated	
2010	Best Current Affairs	Dan Reed, Eamonn Matthews (for "Terror in Mumbai")	Won	
2010	Best Current Affairs	Najibullah Quraishi, Jamie Doran, John Moffat, Paul Woolwich (for "Afghanistan – Behind Enemy Lines")	Nominated	
2011	Best Current Affairs	Deborah Shipley, Brian Woods, Xoliswa Sithole (for "Lost Girls of South Africa")	Nominated	
2014	Best Current Affairs	Chris Swayne, Eamonn Matthews, Olly Lambert (for "Syria – Across the Lines")	Won	
2014	Best Current Affairs	David Henshaw, James Jones, Todd Downing (for "North Korea: Life Inside the Secret State")	Nominated	
2014	Best Current Affairs	Anna Hall, Matt Pinder, Paddy Garrick, Tazeen Ahmad (for "The Hunt for Britain's Sex Gangs")	Nominated	
2015	Best Current Affairs	Marcel Mettelsiefen, Anthony Wonke, Stephen Ellis, Chris Shaw (for "Children on the Frontline")	Won	
2016	Best Current Affairs	Edward Watts, Evan Williams, Sam Collyns, George Waldrum (for "Escape from ISIS")	Nominated	
2018	Best Current Affairs	Sara Afshar, Nicola Cutcher, Callum Macrae (for "Syria's Disappeared: The Case Against Assad")	Nominated	
2019	Best Current Affairs	Evan Williams, Patrick Wells, Eve Lucas, Dan Edge (for "Myanmar's Killing Fields")	Won	
2020	Best Current Affairs	"Growing Up Poor: Britain's Breadline Kids"	Nominated	
2021	Best Current Affairs	Robin Barnwell, Gesbeen Mohammad, Guy Creasey, David Henshaw, Evan Williams (for "The Battle for Hong Kong")	Nominated	

=== British Academy Television Craft Awards ===
The British Academy Television Craft Awards are accolades presented by the British Academy of Film and Television Arts, established in 2000 as a way to spotlight technical achievements.

Year	Category	Nominee	Result	Ref.
2008	Best Breakthrough Talent	Jezza Neumann (for "China's Stolen Children")	Won	
2008	Best Photography: Factual	Jezza Neumann (for "China's Stolen Children")	Nominated	
2008	Best Director: Factual	Jezza Neumann (for "China's Stolen Children")	Won	
2008	Best Editing: Factual	Jezza Neumann, Brian Woods, Reg Clarke (for "China's Stolen Children")	Nominated	
2010	Best Director: Factual	Dan Reed (for "Terror in Mumbai")	Nominated	
2010	Best Director: Factual	Nick Read (for "The Slumdog Children of Mumbai")	Nominated	
2010	Best Photography: Factual	Nick Read (for "The Slumdog Children of Mumbai")	Nominated	
2010	Best Editing: Factual	Jay Taylor (for "The Slumdog Children of Mumbai")	Nominated	
2011	Best Director: Factual	Dan Reed (for "The Battle for Haiti")	Won	
2011	Best Editing: Factual	Peter Haddon (for "The Battle for Haiti")	Nominated	
2014	Best Photography: Factual	Olly Lambert (for "Syria: Across the Lines")	Nominated	
2015	Best Breakthrough Talent	Marcel Mettelsiefen (for "Children on the Frontline")	Nominated	
2015	Best Photography: Factual	Marcel Mettelsiefen (for "Children on the Frontline")	Won	
2016	Best Photography: Factual	Ben Steele (for "The Children Who Beat Ebola")	Nominated	
2018	Best Photography: Factual	Olivier Sarbil (for "The Fight for Mosul")	Nominated	

=== RTS Awards ===
The Royal Television Society Awards are the gold standard of achievement in the television community. Each year six awards recognise excellence across the entire range of programme making and broadcasting skills.

Year	Category	Nominee	Result	Ref.
1997	Current Affairs - Home	Dispatches: Secrets of the Gaul	Won	
1998	Current Affairs - Home	Dispatches: Inside the ALF	Won	
1999	Current Affairs - International	Dispatches: Prime Suspects	Won	
2001	Current Affairs - International	Dispatches: Beneath The Veil	Won	
2007	Current Affairs - International	China's Stolen Children – Dispatches Special	Won	

== Notable episodes ==
=== Young, Nazi and Proud ===
This episode, produced in the UK by David Modell, covers the youth wing of the British National Party (BNP). It was originally broadcast on 4 November 2002 as the eighth episode of the sixteenth season. The documentary won a BAFTA award in the 'Best Current Affairs' category.

The programme focuses on then-chairman of Young BNP, Mark Collett. Interviews highlighted the ideological background of Collett, particularly his sympathetic stance towards the policies of Nazism and Adolf Hitler.

=== MMR: What They Didn't Tell You ===
Broadcast on 18 November 2004, MMR: What They Didn't Tell You featured an investigation by Sunday Times journalist Brian Deer into the campaign against the MMR vaccine by British surgeon Andrew Wakefield. Among a string of allegations, Deer revealed that, when Wakefield claimed a possible link between the vaccine and autism, his own lab had produced secret results which contradicted his claims, and he had registered patent claims on his own single measles vaccine.

Following the programme, Wakefield, funded by the Medical Protection Society, sued Channel 4, The Sunday Times, and Deer personally for libel, but sought to have his lawsuit stayed by the court, so that he did not need to pursue it. The case became high-profile when Channel 4 obtained a court order compelling Wakefield to continue with his lawsuit or abandon it. During two years of litigation, three High Court judgments were obtained against Wakefield from Mr Justice David Eady, including an order that the General Medical Council was required to supply materials from its own investigations to defendants facing libel actions from doctors. In his first judgment, Eady said:

I am quite satisfied, therefore, that the Claimant wished to extract whatever advantage he could from the existence of the proceedings while not wishing to progress them or to give the Defendants an opportunity of meeting the claims.

In pleadings submitted to the court, Channel 4 spelt out what they said the programme had alleged. It said that Wakefield:

1. Had dishonestly and irresponsibly spread fear that the MMR vaccine might cause autism in some children, even though he knew that his own laboratory's tests dramatically contradicted his claims and he knew or ought to have known that there was absolutely no scientific basis at all for his belief that MMR should be broken up into single vaccines.
2. In spreading such fear, also acted dishonestly and irresponsibly, by repeatedly failing to disclose conflicts of interest and/or material information, including his association with contemplated litigation against the manufacturers of MMR and his application for a patent for a vaccine for measles which, if effective, and if the MMR vaccine had been undermined and/or withdrawn on safety grounds, would have been commercially very valuable.
3. Caused medical colleagues serious unease by carrying out research tests on vulnerable children outside the terms or in breach of the permission given by an ethics committee, in particular by subjecting those children to highly invasive and sometimes distressing clinical procedures and thereby abusing them.
4. Has been unremittingly evasive and dishonest in an effort to cover up his wrongdoing.

In January 2007, Wakefield discontinued his claim and paid Channel 4's and Deer's costs.

=== Undercover Mosque ===
Undercover Mosque was first aired on 15 January 2007. The film attracted the attention of West Midlands Police due to the content of the released footage. The documentary presents film footage gathered from 12 months of secret investigation into mosques throughout Britain. The police attempted to determine if criminal offences had been committed by those teaching or preaching at the mosques and other establishments. They presented their evidence to the Crown Prosecution Service who advised that "a realistic prospect of a conviction was unlikely". This was disputed by Bethan David of the Crown Prosecution Services, who note that editing of speeches and a lack of interviewees could have introduced bias. Consequently, the matter was referred to the broadcasting regulator Ofcom.

The resulting complaints were rejected by Ofcom on 19 November 2007, who found that Channel 4 had "accurately represented the material it gathered", and rejected further complaints from the Kingdom of Saudi Arabia, the Royal Embassy of Saudi Arabia, the Islamic Cultural Centre, and from the London Central Mosque. The documentary makers, along with Channel 4, sued the CPS and West Midlands Police for libel. The National Secular Society called for a public enquiry into the role of the West Midlands Police and the CPS in referring the matter to Ofcom in the first place.

=== Undercover Mosque: The Return ===
This programme is a sequel to Undercover Mosque. The programme uses footage filmed by undercover reporters in UK Mosques and Islamic institutions as well as interviews with Muslim academics and prominent figures.

One of the people quoted in the programme was Khalid Yasin. His videos were found to be on sale in the Regent's Park mosque bookshop espousing "extremist" views such as public beheadings, amputations, lashings and crucifixions. He is quoted in the programme as saying: "and then people can see, people without hands, people can see in public heads rolling down the street, people can see in public people got their hands and feet from opposite sides chopped off and they see them crucified, they see people get punished they see people put up against the pole? ... and because they see it, it acts as a deterrent for them because they say I don't want that to happen to me." He published a response to a letter from the producer of the programme calling them "hypocritical and exploitative bigots, [you are] audacious liars and opportunistic media vermin" and "unethical [and] merchants of journalistic vomit".

=== Saving Africa's Witch Children ===
This programme first aired 12 November 2008 and told the story of young children who had been labeled witches and wizards by their family and community and left abandoned, tortured, imprisoned or killed in the Akwa Ibom in Nigeria. The programme followed Sam Itauma, a Nigerian who started a school for the abandoned children called CRARN (Child Rights and Rehabilitation Network) and Englishman Gary Foxcroft who started the charity, to support the school. The programme suggests that the problem is caused by a combination of African traditional beliefs and extreme Christian Pentecostal groups. In particular the programme singles out Liberty Foundation Gospel Ministries for producing a film called "End of the Wicked" which the charity workers blame for the increase in children being abandoned by their families.

=== Undercover Teacher ===
Broadcast in 2005, this episode was about a qualified science teacher, Alex Dolan, who went undercover in schools in Leeds and London to expose the "appalling teaching". One school in particular, Highbury Grove School, was shocked and angry at the programme's methods. Head-teacher Truda White said in an interview with the Guardian:

The values and beliefs we promote at this school are centred on honesty, integrity and generosity. I will have a hard job explaining to the children that all of these were disregarded by one of their teachers, whether she was temporary or not. We are an open school with nothing to hide and all of us feel betrayed by a fellow colleague who came among us and threw our trust in her back in our faces.

Following the broadcast, Dolan was found guilty of misconduct by the General Teaching Council.

=== Ryanair Caught Napping ===
Broadcast on 13 February 2006, this episode saw two undercover reporters obtain jobs as cabin crew, based at Ryanair's operations at London Stansted Airport, and spend 5 months secretly recording the training programme and cabin crew procedures. The documentary criticised Ryanair's training policies, security procedures and aircraft hygiene, and highlighted poor staff morale. It claims to have filmed Ryanair cabin crew sleeping on the job; using aftershave to cover the smell of vomit in the aisle, rather than cleaning it up; ignoring warning alerts on the emergency slide; encouraging staff to falsify references for airport security passes; asking staff not to recheck passengers' passports before they board flights; and a captain of the airline saying that he would lose his job (or get demoted) if he allowed the cabin crew to serve complimentary non-alcoholic drinks and snacks to passengers, during a 3-hour delay in Spain. Staff in training were allegedly falsely told that any Boeing 737-200 (now no longer in service with Ryanair) impact would result in the death of the passenger sitting in seat 1A and that they should not pass this information on to the passenger.

Ryanair denied the allegations and published its correspondence with Dispatches on its website. It also alleged that the programme was misleading and that promotional materials, in particular a photograph of a stewardess sleeping, had been faked by Dispatches.

=== Gaza: The Killing Zone ===
This episode, broadcast in May 2003, follows five weeks in the lives of those living in the Gaza Strip. Beginning two days after the killing of Rachel Corrie, an American member of the International Solidarity Movement, by an IDF bulldozer, the film includes footage of the aftermath of an Israeli flechette attack in a densely populated area and documents the deaths of Tom Hurndall, a British ISM activist, and James Miller, the Channel 4 cameraman who was shot as he filmed Israeli troops bulldozing Palestinian homes.

=== Inside Britain's Israel Lobby ===
Broadcast on 16 November 2009, this episode investigated what was argued to be "one of the most powerful and influential political lobbies in Britain", the Israel lobby, and in particular the Conservative Friends of Israel (CFI).The documentary claimed that donations to the Conservative Party "from all CFI members and their businesses add up to well over £10m over the last eight years". CFI disputed this figure and called the film "deeply flawed", saying that they had only donated £30,000 between 2004 and 2009, but accepting that members of the group had undoubtedly made their own donations to the party.

Dispatches also covered the Israel lobby's alleged influence on the BBC and other British media and further claimed that many media outlets were frightened of broaching the lobby. The Conservative MP Michael Mates said: "The pro-Israel lobby … is the most powerful political lobby. There's nothing to touch them."

Ofcom received 50 complaints about the programme but cleared it of breaching broadcasting rules.

=== How Councils Blow Your Millions ===
Reporter Antony Barnett uncovers unknown deals between cash-strapped councils and banks that are costing taxpayers millions of pounds a year

Broadcast on 6 July 2015, this episode investigated the use of long term lender option borrower option loans by UK councils, provided by banks. The programme unearthed upfront profits made by the banks and high interest rates, with research from Debt Resistance UK.

=== The Truth about Traveller Crime ===
In April 2020, an episode focusing on crime in the Romanichal (English Traveller) community was broadcast. In the programme, Conservative MP Andrew Selous compared Travellers to the Taliban. In May 2020, Jeanette McCormick, the national police GRT lead, stated that there was no substance to the programme's central point that there is a link between higher crime and the presence of Traveller sites. The programme was described by Friends, Families and Travellers, a GRT advocacy group, as misleading and encouraging hatred against Travellers. Ofcom received over 7000 complaints about the programme, which it took 503 days to investigate, before finding no breaches of its code. In the month following the programme's broadcast, there was a spike in hate crimes towards Travellers, with the number of reports to Report Racism GRT almost trebling.

=== Russell Brand: In Plain Sight ===
In September 2023, comedian and actor Russell Brand was accused by one woman of rape and by three others of sexual assaults, and emotional abuse between 2006 and 2013 in a story published by the Sunday Times following an investigation alongside the programme. Brand released a video denying "serious criminal allegations". This episode aired on 16 September 2023.

=== The King, the Prince & Their Secret Millions ===
In October 2024 a "Dispatches Special" with no description of its content on TV guides was scheduled for Saturday 19 October before being cancelled shortly before it was shown. It was then rescheduled to Saturday 26 October before being rescheduled a second time to Saturday 2 November. This led many to speculate about the idea of a scandal secretly rising with lawyers of people in the programme trying to prevent it from being broadcast.

The episode aired on 2 November 2024, entitled "The King, the Prince & Their Secret Millions", and concerned the British royal family.

=== Will AI Take My Job? ===
On 20 October 2025, an episode was focused on the impact of artificial intelligence and automation on the British workforce, and their impact on various industries such as law, fashion, and medicine. At the end of the programme, its presenter "Aisha Gaban" revealed that her likeness and voice were actually created using generative AI; Channel 4 subsequently stated that Gaban marked the first use of an AI-generated presenter on British television.

The character was developed by the agency Seraphinne Vallora, and controlled using prompts written by the episode's producer Kalel Productions. The episode generated varied reactions from viewers, some of whom noticed telltale signs that Gaban was not real. Channel 4 noted post-airing that "this stunt does serve as a useful reminder of just how disruptive AI has the potential to be – and how easy it is to hoodwink audiences with content they have no way of verifying." Louisa Compton, Channel 4's head of news and current affairs, later noted that "the use of an AI presenter is not something we will be making a habit of at Channel 4 – instead our focus in news and current affairs is on premium, fact checked, duly impartial and trusted journalism – something AI is not capable of doing."

== Web-exclusive broadcasts ==
- War Torn - Stories of Separation
- I4I - Films by AJ Nakasila

== See also ==
- List of Dispatches episodes
- This World (TV series)
- Panorama (British TV programme) (BBC, 1953–present)
- World in Action (ITV, 1963–1998)
- This Week (1956 TV programme) (ITV, 1956–1979, 1986–1992)
- Unreported World (Channel 4, 2000–present)
