= Carl Fellstrom =

British journalist, writer and broadcaster

- Born: 22 July 1964 (age 61); Sutton Coldfield, England
- Education: Daventry ashby road comprehensive, Nene college and Greenwich University
- Occupation: Journalist
- Notable credit(s): Sunday Times, The Observer, Sunday Telegraph, Daily Mail, BBC, Channel 4
- Website: www.myspace.com/fellstrom

Carl Fellstrom (born in 1964 in Sutton Coldfield) is a British journalist, writer and broadcaster who specialises in crime and investigations. He has written for all the major UK national newspapers contributing particularly to the Sunday Times, The Observer, Sunday Telegraph, and Daily Mail.

He has also worked for the BBC and Channel 4 on documentaries including assistant producer for Undercover Prisoner for the Dispatches series which highlighted life inside one of Britain's prisons. In December 2008, he published the highly acclaimed and controversial book Hoods, a best selling in depth study of gun crime, drugs, and gangsters in the city of Nottingham.
