= 2020 British Academy Television Craft Awards =

Technical achievements in TV awards ceremony

21st British Academy Television Craft Awards
- Date: 17 July 2020
- Hosted by: Stephen Mangan

The 21st Annual British Academy Television Craft Awards are presented by the British Academy of Film and Television Arts (BAFTA) and were held on 17 July 2020.

== Winners and nominees ==
Winners will be listed first and highlighted in boldface.

Best Breakthrough Talent	Best Director: Multi-Camera
**Aisling Bea (writer) – This Way Up (Channel 4)**; Sean Buckley (writer) – Responsible Child (BBC Two); Aneil Karia (director) – Pure (ep. 3) (Netflix); Laurie Nunn (writer) – Sex Education (Netflix)	**Janet Fraser Crook – Glastonbury 2019 (BBC One)**; Bridget Caldwell – Royal British Legion Festival of Remembrance (BBC One); Matthew Griffiths – Six Nations 2019 – Wales v England (BBC One); Paul McNamara – ITV Racing: Chelternham Festival (ITV)
Best Director: Fiction	Best Director: Factual
**Johan Renck – Chernobyl (Sky Atlantic)**; Harry Bradbeer – Fleabag (BBC Three); Toby Haynes – Brexit: The Uncivil War (Channel 4); Shane Meadows – The Virtues (Channel 4)	**Anthur Cary – The Last Survivors (BBC Two)**; Robin Barnwell – Undercover: Inside China's Digital Gulag (ITV); Mark Lewis – Don't F**k With Cats: Hunting an Internet Killer (Netflix); Dan Reed – Leaving Neverland (Channel 4)
Best Writer: Drama	Best Writer: Comedy
**Jesse Armstrong – Succession (Sky Atlantic)**; Charlie Covell – The End of the F***ing World (Channel 4); Craig Mazin – Chernobyl (Sky Atlantic); Shane Meadows and Jack Thorne – The Virtues (Channel 4)	**Jamie Demetriou – Stath Lets Flats (Channel 4)**; Tom Basden and Sam Leifer – Plebs (ITV2); Danny Brocklehurst – Brassic (Sky 1); Phoebe Waller-Bridge – Fleabag (BBC Three)
Best Editing: Fiction	Best Editing: Factual
**Jinx Godfrey and Simon Smith – Chernobyl (Sky Atlantic)**; Dan Crinnion – Killing Eve (Episode 4) (BBC One); Gary Dollner – Fleabag (BBC Three); Elen Pierce Lewis – Giri/Haji (BBC Two)	Michael Harte – Don’t F**k With Cats: Hunting an Internet Killer (Netflix); Andy R. Worboys – Untouchable: The Rise and Fall of Harvey Weinstein (BBC Two); Jules Cornell – Leaving Neverland (Channel 4); Kim Horton – 63 up (ITV)
Best Costume Design	Best Make Up and Hair Design
**Odile Dicks-Mireaux – Chernobyl (Sky Atlantic)**; Michele Clapton – Game of Thrones (HBO/Sky Atlantic); Joanna Eatwell – Beecham House (ITV); Caroline McCall – His Dark Materials (BBC One)	**Loz Schiavo – Peaky Blinders (BBC One)**; Inma Azorin – The Trial of Christine Keeler (BBC One); Kirstin Chalmers – Catherine the Great (Sky Atlantic); Barrie Gower and Daniel Parker – Chernobyl (Sky Atlantic)
Best Production Design	Best Original Music
**Luke Hull and Claire Levinson-Gendler – Chernobyl (Sky Atlantic)**; Martin Childs and Alison Harvey – The Crown (Netflix); Laurence Dorman and Linda Wilson – Killing Eve (BBC One); Samantha Harley and Miri Katz – Sex Education (Netflix)	**Hildur Guðnadóttir – Chernobyl (Sky Atlantic)**; Keefus Ciancia and David Holmes – Killing Eve (BBC One); Adrian Johnston – Giri/Haji (BBC Two); Andrew Phillips – War in the Blood (BBC Two)
Best Photography: Fiction	Best Photography: Factual
**Jakob Ihre – Chernobyl (Sky Atlantic)**; Joe Anderson – Top Boy (Netflix); Adriano Goldman – The Crown (Netflix); Suzie Lavelle – His Dark Materials (BBC One)	**Howard Bourne, Bertie Gregory and John Shier – Seven Worlds, One Planet (BBC One)**; Doug Anderson, Roger Horrocks and Gavin Thurston – Our Planet (Coastal Seas) (Netflix); Barrie Britton, Jamie McPherson and Hector Skevington-Postles – Our Planet (Frozen Worlds) (Netflix); Neil Harvey and Patrick Smith – Untouchable: The Rise and Fall of Harvey Weinstein (BBC Two)
Best Titles and Graphic Identity	Best Special, Visual and Graphic Effects
**Elastic and Painting Practice – His Dark Materials (BBC One)**; Alex Maclean – The Durrells (ITV); Elastic – Catherine the Great (Sky Atlantic); Light Creative – Ghosts (BBC One)	**Russel Dogson, Framestore, Painting Practice and Real SFX – His Dark Materials (BBC One)**; DNEG, Lindsay McFarlande, Claudius Christian Rauch and Jean-Clement Soret – Chernobyl (Sky Atlantic); Milk Visual Effects, Real SFX and Gareth Spensley – Good Omens (BBC Two); Chris Reynolds, Asa Shoul and Ben Turner – The Crown (Netflix)
Best Sound: Fiction	Best Sound: Factual
**Sound Team – Chernobyl (Sky Atlantic)**; Dillon Bennett, Gareth Bull, James Ridgeway and Jon Thomas – His Dark Materials (BBC One); Fraser Barber, Stuart Hilliker, Lee Walpole and Ian Wilkinson – A Christmas Carol (BBC One); Sound Team – The Crown (Netflix)	**Sound Team – Battle of the Brass Bands (Sky Arts)**; Nick Adams, James Evans, Nick Fry and Steve Speed – Formula 1: Drive to Survive (Netflix); Kate Hopkins and Graham Wild – Seven Worlds, One Planet (BBC One); Kate Hopkins, Tim Owens and Graham Wild – Our Planet (One Planet) (Netflix)
Best Entertainment Craft Team	Best Scripted Casting
**David Bishop, Patrick Doherty, Vicky Gill and Andy Tapley – Strictly Come Dancing (BBC One)**; Bronski, Misty Buckley, Amber Rimell and Tim Routledge – Glastonbury 2019 (BBC Two); Mark Busk-Cowley, Steve Kruger, Iain Stirling and James Tinsley – Love Island (ITV); Nigel Catmur, Patrick Doherty, Kevin Duff and Andrew Stokes – Royal British Legion Festival of Remembrance (BBC One)	**Des Hamilton – Top Boy (Netflix)**; Lauren Evans – Sex Education (Netflix); Nina Gold and Robert Sterne – Chernobyl (Sky Atlantic); Yoko Narahashi – Giri/Haji (BBC Two)

== See also ==
- 2020 British Academy Television Awards
