= Frozen Planet =

2011 British nature documentary series

- Genre: Nature documentary
- Created by: BBC Natural History Unit
- Directed by: Ray Dal
- Narrated by: David Attenborough (episode 1-7 UK, episode 7 US); Alec Baldwin (Episode 1-6 US)
- Composers: George Fenton; Barnaby Taylor (Episode 7)
- Country of origin: United Kingdom
- Original language: English
- No. of series: 1
- No. of episodes: 7

Production
- Executive producer: Alastair Fothergill
- Producers: Vanessa Berlowitz (Episode 1 & Special); Mark Linfield (Episode 2); Miles Barton (Episode 3 & 4); Kathryn Jeffs (Episode 5); Dan Rees (Episode 6 & 7)
- Running time: 60 minutes
- Production company: BBC Natural History Unit

Original release
- Network: BBC One
- Release: 26 October – 28 December 2011

Related
- The Blue Planet; Frozen Planet II; The Green Planet; Planet Earth

Frozen Planet is a 2011 British nature documentary series. It was produced as a co-production between the BBC Natural History Unit, Discovery Channel, Antena 3 Television S.A., ZDF, Skai tv and The Open University, in association with Discovery Channel Canada. The production team, which includes executive producer Alastair Fothergill and series producer Vanessa Berlowitz, were previously responsible for the award-winning series The Blue Planet (2001) and Planet Earth (2006), and Frozen Planet is billed as a sequel of sorts. David Attenborough returns as narrator. The series is distributed internationally by BBC Worldwide.

The seven-part series focuses on life and the environment in both the Arctic and Antarctic. The production team were keen to film a comprehensive record of the natural history of the polar regions because climate change is affecting landforms such as glaciers, ice shelves, and the extent of sea ice. The series was met with critical acclaim and holds a Metacritic score of 91/100.

Whilst the series was broadcast in full in the UK, the BBC chose to make the series' seventh episode, which focuses on climate change, optional for syndication in order to aid sales of the show in countries where the issue is politically sensitive. The US Discovery Channel originally announced that they would air only the first six episodes of the show, but they later added the seventh episode to their schedule.

In 2012, the US broadcast won four Emmy Awards, including Outstanding Nonfiction Series. A sequel titled Frozen Planet II began aring in September 2022, which covers more frozen habitats than just the polar regions, while also emphasizing more on the threat of climate change.

== Production ==
=== Filming ===
Frozen Planet finished filming in 2010 and focused on the challenges facing polar bears and Arctic wolves in the north and Adelie penguins and wandering albatrosses in the south, although many other storylines are developed. After an introductory episode, the subsequent four episodes depict the changing seasons at the poles, before an episode focusing on mankind's activities there. The final episode, "On Thin Ice", examines how global warming is affecting the polar regions. Filmmakers worked in new locations, including Antarctica's active volcanoes and the Russian Arctic. Sequences captured include migrating eider ducks, footage of a fur seal colony from the air, and pack hunting of seals by killer whales. The aerial photography used the Cineflex and Gyron cameras pioneered on Planet Earth, which enable steady footage to be captured from long range without disturbing the animals.

From late April to early May 2009, BBC crews were in Hay River, Northwest Territories, Canada filming the annual breakup of the river of the same name, which flows into Great Slave Lake.

==== Zoo-filmed material ====
The BBC was accused of staging after it was reported that one scene of a polar bear giving birth was filmed in a Dutch (initially reported as German) animal park. The BBC defended its faking of the shots, explaining that it would have been impossible to film the event in the wild without endangering the cubs, that the commentary was careful not to mislead the audience, and that the Frozen Planet website had already explained how the scene was captured before the story appeared in the media.

== Release ==
Frozen Planet was broadcast on BBC One starting 26 October 2011. Each of the first six episodes comprises the main programme followed by a 10-minute featurette called Freeze Frame, which shows how some of the sequences were filmed. David Attenborough's principal role is to narrate the programmes, but he appears briefly on camera to give an introduction and a closing statement. For the seventh programme, "On Thin Ice", he serves as writer and presenter for what was billed by the BBC as a personal statement on the effects of climate change at the poles. A special programme called "Frozen Planet: The Epic Journey" featuring re-edited highlights from the series was broadcast on BBC One on 28 December 2011.

In the United States, Frozen Planet premiered on the Discovery Channel on 18 March 2012 with Alec Baldwin replacing David Attenborough as narrator of the first six episodes. The "Autumn" episode from the BBC series was replaced by "The Making of Frozen Planet", a compilation of the Freeze Frame featurettes, and the title of the sixth episode was changed from "The Last Frontier" to "Life in the Freezer". The network originally decided not to broadcast Attenborough's "On Thin Ice" episode, citing "scheduling conflicts", but later reversed their decision, and "On Thin Ice" was broadcast on Earth Day, 22 April 2012.

In Australia, the series was broadcast on the Nine Network beginning on 27 October 2011. In France, the series has been acquired by France Television, and aired in March–April 2013 under the name "Terres de Glace".

== Episodes ==
All episode names from BBC website. Ratings include overnight audience shares, with consolidated viewers supplied by BARB.

No.	Title	Original release date	UK viewers (millions)
1	"To the Ends of the Earth"	26 October 2011	8.81 million viewers (27.4% audience share)
The opening travels from the North Pole to the South Pole encountering different climates and landscapes on the way. Animals highlighted in this episode include the polar bear (Ursus maritimus), the short-tailed shearwater (Puffinus tenuirostris), the humpback whale (Megaptera novaeangliae), the caribou (Rangifer tarandus), the gray wolf (Canis lupus) hunting for American bison (Bison bison), the great grey owl (Strix nebulosa), the gentoo penguin (Pygoscelis papua), the South American sea lion (Otaria flavescens), the killer whale (Orcinus orca) hunting for crabeater seal (Lobodon carcinophagus) and Weddell seal (Leptonychotes weddellii), a species of icefish (suborder Notothenioidei), and a species of sea spider (order Pantopoda).
2	"Spring"	2 November 2011	9.72 million viewers (31.4% audience share)
The subject of the second programme is to follow the polar spring: the ice melts and migratory animals move to the polar regions. Most animals give birth to their offspring. Animals highlighted in this episode include the Adélie penguin (Pygoscelis adeliae), the polar bear (Ursus maritimus) hunting for ringed seal (Pusa hispida), the narwhal (Monodon monoceros), a species of sea gooseberry (phylum Ctenophora), a species of sea slug, a species of sea snail, the Arctic cod (could be Arctogadus glacialis or Boreogadus saida), the Arctic woolly bear moth (Gynaephora groenlandica), the Arctic wolf (Canis lupus arctos), the king penguin (Aptenodytes patagonicus), the macaroni penguin (Eudyptes chrysolophus), the wandering albatross (Diomedea exulans), the southern elephant seal (Mirounga leonina), and the killer whale (O. orca).
3	"Summer"	9 November 2011	8.84 million viewers (29.0% audience share)
This episode follows the short polar summer: the sun does not set for months and the ice is largely gone. Animals highlighted in this episode include the polar bear (Ursus maritimus), the red phalarope (Phalaropus fulicarius), the Arctic tern (Sterna paradisaea), the common eider (Somateria mollissima), the snowy owl (Bubo scandiacus), the Lapland bunting (Calcarius lapponicus), the Arctic wolf (Canis lupus arctos) hunting for muskoxen (Ovibos moschatus), the king penguin (A. patagonicus), the Antarctic fur seal (Arctocephalus gazella), the crabeater seal (Lobodon carcinophagus), the Antarctic krill (Euphausia superba), the humpback whale (M. novaeangliae), the Antarctic minke whale (Balaenoptera bonaerensis) being hunted by killer whales, and the Adélie penguin being hunted by south polar skua (Stercorarius maccormicki).
4	"Autumn"	16 November 2011	7.29 million viewers (22.3% audience share)
This episode follows the polar autumn: temperatures are dropping, seas are freezing, and arctic animals migrate south away from the expanding ice. Animals highlighted in this episode include the polar bear, the beluga whale (Delphinapterus leucas), Brünnich's guillemot (Uria lomvia) being hunted by Arctic foxes (Vulpes lagopus), the muskox (Ovibos moschatus), the caribou, the southern giant petrel (Macronectes giganteus), the South Georgia pintail (Anas georgica georgica), the Adélie penguin being hunted by leopard seal (Hydrurga leptonyx), and the emperor penguin (Aptenodytes forsteri).
5	"Winter"	23 November 2011	8.29 million viewers (27.2% audience share)
The fifth instalment is set in the polar winter: the polar regions are scourged by extreme cold and strong winds. The snow spreads into the subarctic regions such as the taiga forests of the Northern Hemisphere. Animals highlighted in this episode include the polar bear, the spectacled eider (Somateria fischeri), the common eider, the gray wolf hunting for American bison, the wolverine (Gulo gulo), the common raven (Corvus corax), an unspecified vole (subfamily Arvicolinae) hunted by both the great grey owl and the least weasel (Mustela nivalis), the emperor penguin, the Weddell seal, the bald notothen (Pagothenia borchgrevinki, called "Borchgrevinki fish" by David Attenborough), and the Adélie penguin.
6	"The Last Frontier"	30 November 2011	6.64 million viewers (19.2% audience share)
This episode explores human activity in the polar regions. In the north, Longyearbyen and Norilsk are among the coldest permanent settlements in the world. The Dolgan tribe of northern Russia is dependent on reindeer while the Inuit of Chukotka risk their lives hunting for walruses and collecting guillemot eggs. Also, Special Forces defend the Danish claim to Greenland, and in Alaska, rockets are used to study the spectacular aurora borealis. Antarctica has no permanent human residents, but people visit the continent for various reasons. Tourists visit to see king penguins, biologists use robot submarines to discover new life forms, geologists study the active volcano Mount Erebus and its unique caves, and astronomers use balloons to study cosmic rays. Amundsen–Scott South Pole Station is located exactly at the South Pole; it is named after the leaders of the first two expeditions to reach the Pole, Roald Amundsen (in 1911) and Robert Falcon Scott (in 1912).
7	"On Thin Ice"	7 December 2011	8.07 million viewers (27.4% audience share)
The episode follows about the climate change, global warming, the melting of the ice caps and their consequences. Polar bears and Adélie penguins lose their habitat and the Inuit must adapt, as well.
Specials	"The Epic Journey"	28 December 2011	5.66 million viewers
This 1-hour special brings together highlights of the series.

== Soundtrack ==
Frozen Planet

Soundtrack album by George Fenton
- Released: 18 March 2013
- Genres: Soundtrack, Classical music
- Length: 1:14:59
- Label: Silva Screen Records
- Producers: BBC Worldwide; BBC Earth

The musical score and songs featured in the series were all composed and conducted by George Fenton, performed by the BBC Concert Orchestra, with the exception of On Thin Ice, its music being composed and conducted instead by Barnaby Taylor. The soundtrack was released on 18 March 2013.

Frozen Planet

No.	Title	Length
1.	"Frozen Planet Opening Titles"	0:30
2.	"The North Pole"	2:02
3.	"Rapid Change"	1:21
4.	"Surfing Penguins"	1:01
5.	"Antarctic Mystery"	3:53
6.	"Flying South"	4:12
7.	"Stones"	2:06
8.	"McKenzie River"	2:41
9.	"Cubs' First Hunt"	3:34
10.	"Narwhals"	3:02
11.	"Elephant Seal Duel"	2:09
12.	"Returning Seabirds / Albatross Love"	2:20
13.	"Ice Sculptures"	1:25
14.	"Leaping Penguins"	1:28
15.	"Owlets / Protection"	2:48
16.	"Seal Ballet / Arrival of the Humpbacks"	3:39
17.	"Lazy Bear"	0:50
18.	"Exercise"	1:36
19.	"Belugas"	2:27
20.	"Competing for the Girl"	3:06
21.	"The Long March"	1:17
22.	"Winter"	3:04
23.	"Activity"	2:02
24.	"Weasel"	1:54
25.	"Winter Sets in"	3:25
26.	"Battle of Wills"	5:38
27.	"Emperors Return"	3:00
28.	"Greenland Patrol"	1:24
29.	"Minus Forty"	1:52
30.	"Following the Herd"	1:27
31.	"Walrus Kill"	1:31
32.	"Scott's Legacy"	2:36
Total length:		74:59

== Reception ==
=== "On Thin Ice" in the United States ===
Uncertainty surrounded whether the series' seventh episode, which focuses on climate change, would air in the United States, where it is a politically sensitive issue.

In an interview with Radio Times, Attenborough explains that "data from satellites collected over the last 40 years show a drop of 30% in the area of the Arctic sea ice at the end of each summer." Former UK Conservative politician Nigel Lawson dismissed the idea as "alarmism", provoking a polar oceanographer working with the show to describe his criticism as patronising, factually incorrect and the "usual tired obfuscation and generalisation". Attenborough subsequently rebutted Lawson's allegations.

This episode was initially not expected to be shown in the United States. Ten networks that would have run the episode opted out, citing fear of controversy.

On 6 December 2011, the Discovery Channel announced it would air the seventh and final episode of Frozen Planet. "On Thin Ice" includes on-camera shots of Attenborough, who narrates the British version, discussing what shrinking glaciers and rising temperatures mean for people and wildlife that live in the region, as well as the rest of the planet. The music for this episode was composed by Barnaby Taylor.

=== Viewership ===
The series quickly became a ratings success in the UK, with the second episode broadcast on 2 November 2011 becoming the highest-rated natural history programme there since 2001. The series drew an average audience of 8.67 million viewers.

=== Accolades ===
In May 2012, Frozen Planet won in three categories at the British Academy Television Craft Awards, collecting prizes for best sound, best editing, and best photography. At the BAFTA Television Awards, Frozen Planet was nominated for Best Specialist Factual and the YouTube Audience Award, but lost in both categories. It was also nominated for a Royal Television Society award.

The US broadcast won four prizes at the Primetime Creative Arts Emmy Awards in September 2012, including outstanding nonfiction series, cinematography, sound editing, and picture editing. The following month, it won in three categories at the Wildscreen Festival in Bristol, UK, taking the Panda Awards for best sound, best cinematography, and best series, the latter shared with Human Planet. In January 2013, the series won the public vote for Best Documentary Series at the UK's National Television Awards, beating out Big Fat Gypsy Weddings, One Born Every Minute and Planet Earth Live.

Year	Award	Category	Nominee	Result	Ref.
2012	Primetime Creative Arts Emmy Awards	Outstanding Nonfiction Series	Alastair Fothergill, Susan Winslow, Vanessa Berlowitz	Won	
2012	Primetime Creative Arts Emmy Awards	Outstanding Cinematography for a Nonfiction Program	Cinematography Team (for "To the Ends of the Earth")	Won	
2012	Primetime Creative Arts Emmy Awards	Outstanding Picture Editing for a Nonfiction Program	Andy Netley, Sharon Gillooly (for "To the Ends of the Earth")	Won	
2012	Primetime Creative Arts Emmy Awards	Outstanding Sound Editing for a Nonfiction or Reality Program (Single or Multi-Camera)	Kate Hopkins, Tim Owens, Paul Fisher (for "To the Ends of the Earth")	Won	
2012	Primetime Creative Arts Emmy Awards	Outstanding Sound Mixing for a Nonfiction or Reality Program (Single or Multi-Camera)	Graham Wild, Archie Moore (for "To the Ends of the Earth")	Nominated	
2012	British Academy Television Awards	Best Specialist Factual	David Attenborough, Vanessa Berlowitz, Alastair Fothergill, Mark Linfield	Nominated	
2012	British Academy Television Awards	YouTube Audience Award	Frozen Planet	Nominated	
2012	British Academy Television Craft Awards	Best Director: Factual	Vanessa Berlowitz, Chadden Hunter, Kathryn Jeffs (for "To the Ends of the Earth")	Nominated	
2012	British Academy Television Craft Awards	Best Editing: Factual	Nigel Buck, Andy Netley, Dave Pearce (for "To the Ends of the Earth")	Won	
2012	British Academy Television Craft Awards	Best Original Music	George Fenton	Nominated	
2012	British Academy Television Craft Awards	British Academy Television Craft Award for Best Photography: Factual	Camera Team (for "To the Ends of the Earth")	Won	
2012	British Academy Television Craft Awards	Best Sound: Factual	Kate Hopkins, Tim Owens, Graham Wild (for "To the Ends of the Earth")	Won	

== Home media ==
Three disc region-free Blu-ray and Region 2+4 DVD box sets were released on 8 December 2011, and include the complete series as broadcast in the UK, although On Thin Ice is considered a special feature on the third disc. In North America, the Blu-ray and Region 1 DVD box sets were released on 17 April 2012, and unlike the Discovery broadcast version, retained David Attenborough's original narration. They also include extra features not present on the UK discs: Frozen Planet: The Epic Journey, an hour-long edited highlights, and Production Video Diaries, a series of 47 video shorts made by the crew as they filmed the series.

== Other media ==
=== Book ===
Frozen Planet: A World Beyond Imagination accompanies the TV series and was released in hardcover format on 13 October 2011. It is written by the series producers Alastair Fothergill and Vanessa Berlowitz, with a foreword by David Attenborough. The UK version was published by BBC Books (ISBN 9781846079627) and the North American version was published by Firefly Books (ISBN 9781554079919).

=== Open University poster ===
A Frozen Planet poster was produced in collaboration with and distributed for free by The Open University. Both the Arctic Circle and Antarctica are mapped. In addition, detailed profiles of the respective flora and fauna, geology and ice formations are provided as well as timelines of human exploration.

=== Calendar ===
Frozen Planet wall calendars were published in the UK for 2012 (ISBN 9781847708564), 2013 (ISBN 9781780540818) and 2014 (ISBN 9781780543093).
