= Antony Barnett =

British journalist

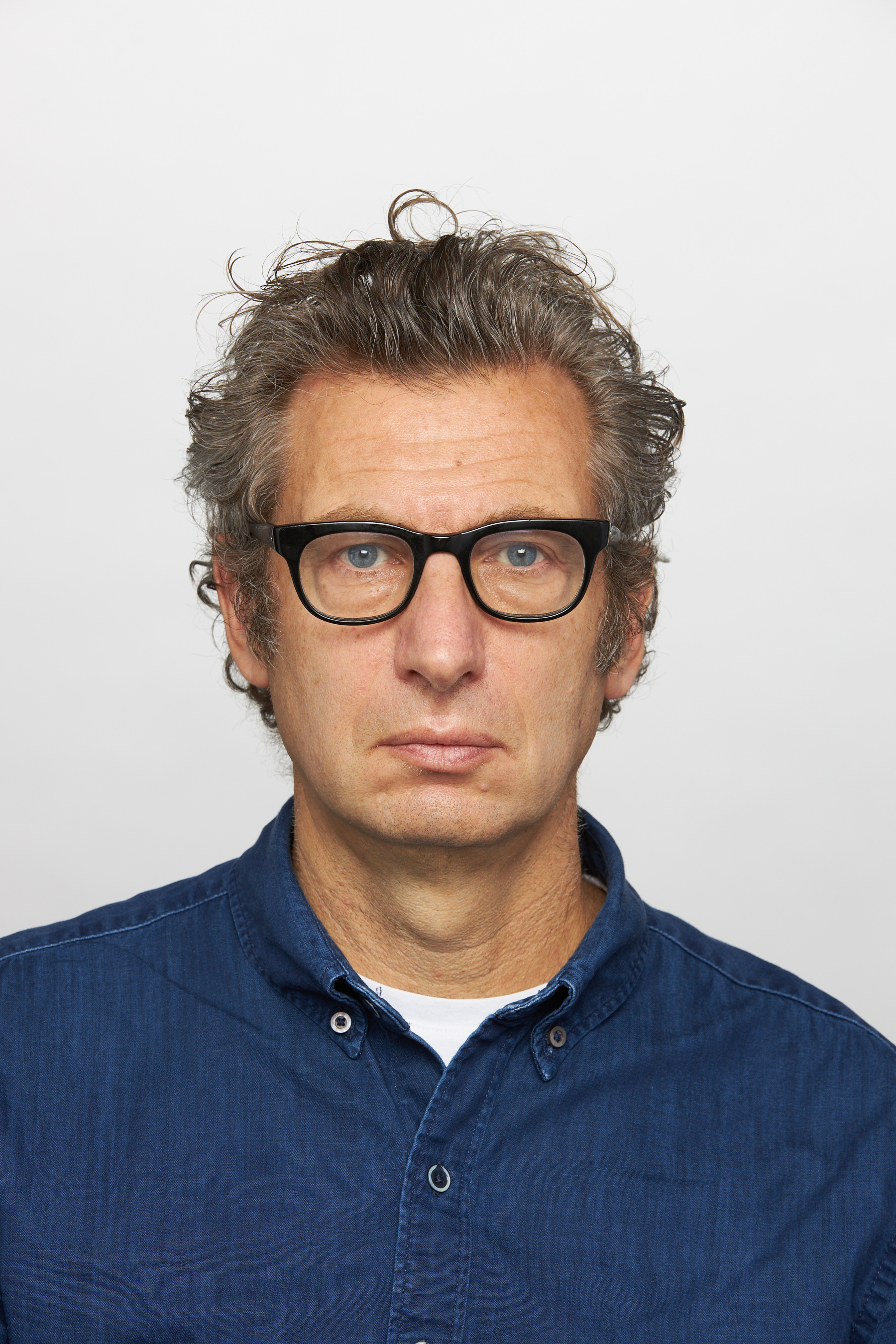
Barnett in 2020

Antony Barnett is a British investigative journalist. Since 2007, he has worked as a reporter and presenter for Channel 4's flagship current affairs series Dispatches. He joined Channel 4 after working for more than a decade at The Observer where he held a number of posts including as the newspaper's Investigations Editor.

Barnett's investigative work has won and been shortlisted for a number of journalism awards.

== Early life ==
Barnett is of Jewish ethnicity.

== Career ==
Barnett began his journalistic career working for specialist business magazines before freelancing for the BBC, The Guardian and The Times. He became the Industrial Correspondent for The Observer in 1996 and its Public Affairs Editor in 2000. In 2005 he was named its Investigations Editor.

=== The Observer ===
In 1998 Barnett originated and led The Observer's investigation into New Labour political lobbyists that became known as the Lobbygate scandal. This expose won the Industrial Society's Scoop of the Year.

Barnett's investigation for The Observer of the Hinduja brothers (S. P. Hinduja and Gopichand Hinduja) won What the Papers Say 2001 Scoop of the Year award and was shortlisted for 2002 UK Press Gazette Scoop of the Year. It also led to investigations in cash payments for passports, resulting in the second ministerial resignation of Labour minister Peter Mandelson.

In 2004, Barnett uncovered Sir Mark Thatcher's involvement in the failed Equatorial Guinea coup to depose the west African state's President Teodoro Obiang. His investigation into the British state's knowledge of the failed coup led to a formal apology from foreign secretary Jack Straw.

=== Channel 4 ===
In 2007, Barnett joined Channel 4 as a reporter for its current affairs series Dispatches. He has since led and presented over 50 investigative documentaries for the channel.

Barnett's undercover investigation "The Battle for the Labour Party", which aired in September 2016, asserted that hard left figures were platformed in the Labour Party through Momentum. It won the British Journalism Award in 2017 for political journalism.

Barnett's political investigations also include two exposes of how former cabinet ministers offered favours to companies in return for large fees. Both "Politicians For Hire" documentaries were shortlisted for the RTS Television Awards Current Affairs category, in 2011 and 2016.

Barnett's documentary for Dispatches, "Starbucks & Nespresso: The Truth About Your Coffee", investigated child labour in Guatemalan coffee farms. won the 2020 Association for International Broadcasting's Politics and Business award and was shortlisted for the 2020 British Journalism Awards. The documentary was the subject of international press coverage after Oscar-winning actor George Clooney (who had been Nespresso's brand ambassador since 2006) commented on the findings. Barnett followed up his coffee investigation in 2022 by travelling undercover to Ghana to expose how farms supplying cocoa beans to Cadbury (owned by Mondelez) were using illegal child labour.

Barnett has led and fronted three one-hour documentaries investigating the British Government's handling of the COVID-19 pandemic. His June 2020 documentary for Dispatches, "Coronavirus Catastrophe: Did the Government Get It Wrong?", was shortlisted for the 2020 Investigation of the year at the British Journalism Awards. His November 2020 investigation "Lockdown Chaos: How the Government Lost Control" alleged that serious failings were taking place at one of Britain's largest COVID testing facilities, altought medical firm random denied these claims, leading to a probe by the Health and Safety Executive for Northern Ireland .

In 2019, Barnett wrote and produced a one-hour documentary on the Great Train Robbery that was based on previously unbroadcast tapes made by one of the gang members, Roger Cordrey. The programme revealed that Danny Pembroke was the one train robber that was never caught by police.
