= Don't F**k with Cats: Hunting an Internet Killer =

2019 American true crime documentary series

- Promotional release poster
- Genre: True crime; Documentary
- Written by: Mark Lewis
- Directed by: Mark Lewis
- Composer: Andrew Skeet
- Country of origin: United States
- Original languages: English; French; German
- No. of episodes: 3

Production
- Executive producers: Dimitri Doganis; Adam Hawkins; Jonny Taylor; Alexander Van Nguyen
- Producers: Felicity Morris; Simon Mills
- Cinematography: Stefano Ferrari
- Editors: Henry Adkin; Michael Harte; Bjorn Johnson
- Running time: 57–66 minutes
- Production company: Raw TV

Original release
- Network: Netflix
- Release: December 18, 2019

Don't F**k with Cats: Hunting an Internet Killer is a 2019 true crime docuseries about an online manhunt. It is written and directed by Mark Lewis and was released on Netflix on December 18, 2019. The series chronicles events following a crowd-sourced amateur investigation into a series of animal cruelty acts committed by Canadian Luka Magnotta, culminating in his murder of Jun Lin, a student from China who was studying at Concordia University. It was one of Netflix's Top 5 most-watched documentaries of 2019.

== Premise ==
The three-part docuseries follows a group of amateur internet sleuths who launched a manhunt for Luka Magnotta after he gained international notoriety in 2010 for sharing a video online of himself killing two kittens in a plastic bag by suffocating them with a vacuum cleaner. Magnotta was later convicted of murdering Jun Lin in 2012.

== Early investigation ==
The series started with Deanna Thompson, a data analyst for a casino in Las Vegas, and John Green, from Los Angeles. In 2010, a viral video called 1 boy 2 kittens was linked on Facebook and posted on YouTube. The video shows a man playing with two kittens before he puts them in a vacuum seal bag and vacuums out the air, suffocating the kittens. Thompson and Green subsequently joined a Facebook group to build evidence and find the perpetrator. The group worked together to examine the details of the video, including the objects in the room, to help solve the mystery.

== Cast ==
Cast	Role	Episodes
John Green	Himself	3 episodes
Deanna Thompson	Herself—aka "Baudi Moovan"	3 episodes
Det. Sgt. Claudette Hamlin	Herself—Montreal Police, Homicide	2 episodes
Antonio Paradiso	Himself—Montreal Police, Homicide	2 episodes
Anna Yourkin	Herself—Luka Magnotta's mother	2 episodes
Benjamin Xu	Himself—Jun Lin's best friend	2 episodes
Marc Lilge	Himself—Berlin Police	2 episodes
Mike Nadeau	Himself—Janitor	1 episode
Joe Panz	Himself—Rescue Ink	1 episode
Joe Warmington	Himself—Journalist, Toronto Sun	1 episode
Henri	Himself—Undercover Detective Fugitive Task Force	1 episode
Romeo Salta	Himself—Attorney	1 episode
Kadir Anlayisli	Himself—Internet cafe employee	1 episode
Joel Watts	Himself—Defense psychiatrist	1 episode

== Episodes ==
No.	Title	Directed by	Written by	Original release date
1	"Cat and Mouse"	Mark Lewis	Mark Lewis	December 18, 2019
A shocking online video brings together a widespread internet group of animal lovers out for justice. Their target, meanwhile, has more horrors planned.
2	"Killing for Clicks"	Mark Lewis	Mark Lewis	December 18, 2019
A new video pushes panic to the next level, galvanizing the "internet nerds" to intensify their own painstaking investigation as police join the hunt.
3	"Closing the Net"	Mark Lewis	Mark Lewis	December 18, 2019
With the killer's identity – and twisted motives – revealed, the group finds more key clues as the global police manhunt reaches a fever pitch.

== Reception ==
Two weeks after its debut, the docuseries became one of Netflix's Top 5 most-watched documentaries of 2019. On the review aggregator website Rotten Tomatoes, the series has a 67% approval rating, based on 12 reviews, with an average rating of 8.3/10. The website's consensus reads, "Don't F**k With Cats offers an intriguing tale, but questionable intent and muddled storytelling make it a hard sell for anyone but true crime completists."

== Accolades ==
Year	Award	Category	Nominee(s)	Result	Ref.
2020	British Academy Television Awards	Best Factual Series or Strand	Mark Lewis, Felicity Morris, Michael Harte and Dimitri Doganis	Nominated	
2020	British Academy Television Craft Awards	Best Director: Factual	Mark Lewis	Nominated	
2020	British Academy Television Craft Awards	Best Editing: Factual	Michael Harte	Won	
2020	Primetime Creative Arts Emmy Awards	Outstanding Writing for a Nonfiction Program	Mark Lewis (for "Closing the Net")	Won	

== Impact ==
In the trial for the 2021 murder of Jorge Martin Carreno, prosecutors provided video and audio evidence of the defendant, Scarlet Blake, livestreaming the killing and dissecting of a cat, with the New Order song "True Faith" playing in the background; they said the defendant's use of the song was in homage to the docuseries Don't F*** With Cats. Blake was sentenced to life imprisonment for the murder. At her sentencing hearing, Mr Justice Chamberlain told Blake "[the] documentary played a part in your own mind in the link between killing a cat and killing a person."

Deanna Thompson, one of the lead presenters of the docuseries, later appeared as a contestant on the seventh season of The Mole in 2024.

== See also ==
- Internet culture
- Internet vigilantism
