= Claire Popplewell =

Claire Louise Popplewell CVO, is a producer, director, executive producer and editor, who has been creative director at BBC Studios Events Productions since November 2018, where she leads a team responsible for covering major UK and international events.

In 2022, she received the Royal Television Society Outstanding Contribution Award.

She was made a Commander of the Royal Victorian Order in the 2023 New Year Honours for services to the Platinum Jubilee of Her Late Majesty The Queen.
