= 2020 British Academy Television Awards =

Edition of annual television awards

66th British Academy Television Awards
- Date: 31 July 2020
- Site: Television Centre, London
- Hosted by: Richard Ayoade

Highlights
- Best Comedy Series: Stath Lets Flats
- Best Drama: The End of the F***ing World
- Best Actor: Jared Harris; Chernobyl
- Best Actress: Glenda Jackson; Elizabeth Is Missing
- Best Comedy Performance: Jamie Demetriou Stath Lets Flats; Sian Clifford Fleabag
- Most awards: The End of the F***ing World; Stath Lets Flats; Chernobyl (2)
- Most nominations: Fleabag (4)

Television coverage
- Channel: BBC One
- Duration: 90 minutes

The 2020 British Academy Television Awards were held on 31 July 2020, hosted by British director and comic actor Richard Ayoade.

The nominations for the jury awards were announced on 4 June 2020, whilst the nominees for the audience award, "Virgin TV's Must-See Moments", were announced on 3 June 2020. The End of the F***ing World, Stath Lets Flats and Chernobyl each won two awards, with The End of the F***ing World taking home the Best Drama mask and Stath Lets Flats winning Best Scripted Comedy. In the news coverage awards, ITV won two masks.

The 2020 British Academy Television Craft Awards had been held on 17 July 2020. Both ceremonies were held during the COVID-19 pandemic with social distancing practices. The Craft Awards event was entirely virtual, while much of the Television Awards ceremony was connected by video call, though it was hosted and presented from an audience-less Television Centre in London. Combining wins from both events, Chernobyl set a new record for total BAFTA wins in one year, taking home nine masks from fourteen nominations. The Special Award was presented to Idris Elba.

== Winners and nominees ==
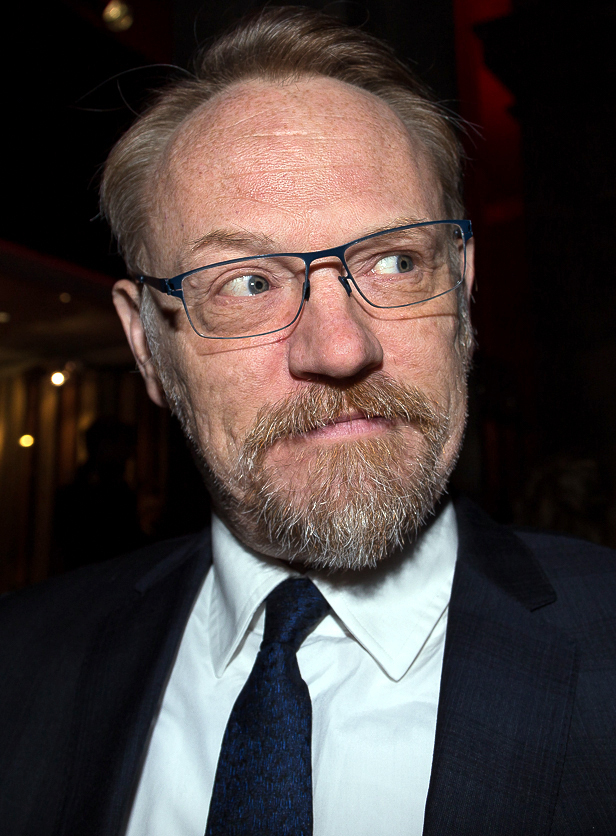
Best Actor award winner Jared Harris. In his acceptance speech, he said the first choice for his role had actually been Daniel Day-Lewis.

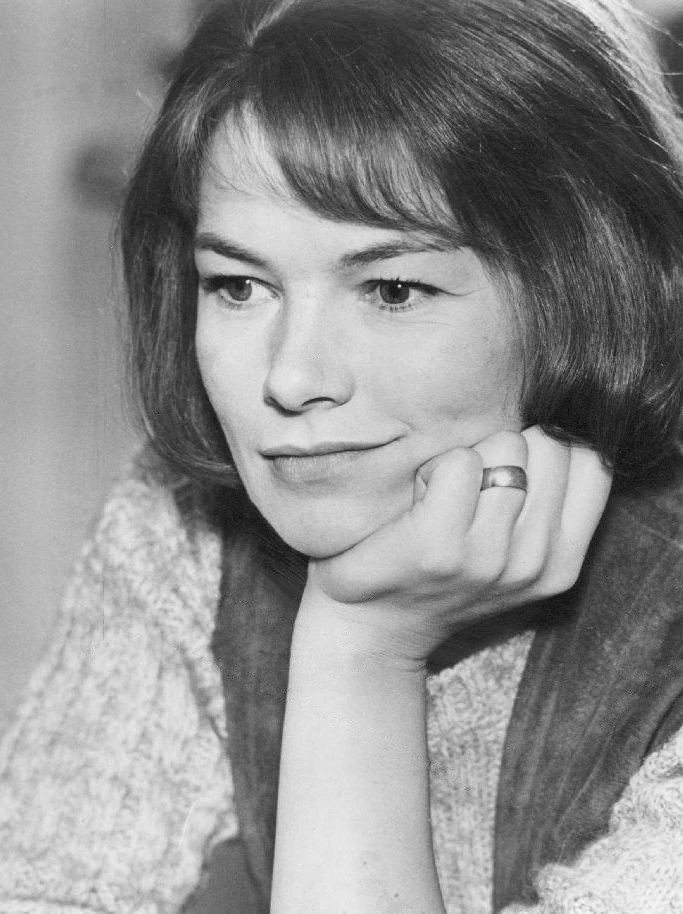
Best Actress winner Glenda Jackson, photographed in 1971. Her previous BAFTA was awarded 27 years prior.

Winners will be listed first and highlighted in boldface.

Best Drama Series	Best Mini-Series
The End of the F***ing World (Netflix/Channel 4); The Crown (Netflix); Gentleman Jack (HBO/BBC One); Giri/Haji (BBC Two)	**Chernobyl (Sky Atlantic)**; A Confession (ITV); The Victim (BBC One); The Virtues (Channel 4)
Best Single Drama	Best Soap and Continuing Drama
**The Left Behind (BBC Three)**; Brexit: The Uncivil War (Channel 4); Elizabeth is Missing (BBC One); Responsible Child (BBC Two)	**Emmerdale (ITV)**; Casualty (BBC One); Coronation Street (ITV); Holby City (BBC One)
Best Actor	Best Actress
**Jared Harris – Chernobyl as Valery Legasov (HBO/Sky Atlantic)**; Takehiro Hira – Giri/Haji as Kenzo Mori (BBC Two); Stephen Graham – The Virtues as Joseph (Channel 4); Callum Turner – The Capture as Shaun Amery (BBC One)	**Glenda Jackson – Elizabeth is Missing as Maud (BBC One)**; Jodie Comer – Killing Eve as Villanelle (BBC One); Suranne Jones – Gentleman Jack as Anne Lister (HBO/BBC One); Samantha Morton – I Am Kirsty as Kirsty (Channel 4)
Best Supporting Actor	Best Supporting Actress
**Will Sharpe – Giri/Haji as Rodney (BBC Two)**; Joe Absolom – A Confession as Christopher Halliwell (ITV); Josh O'Connor – The Crown as Prince Charles (Netflix); Stellan Skarsgård – Chernobyl as Boris Shcherbina (HBO/Sky Atlantic)	Naomi Ackie – The End of the F***ing World as Bonnie (Channel 4); Helen Behan – The Virtues as Anna (Channel 4); Helena Bonham Carter – The Crown as Princess Margaret (Netflix); Jasmine Jobson – Top Boy as Jaq (Netflix)
Best Male Comedy Performance	Best Female Comedy Performance
**Jamie Demetriou – Stath Lets Flats as Stath (Channel 4)**; Ncuti Gatwa – Sex Education as Eric Effiong (Netflix); Youssef Kerkour – Home as Sami (Channel 4); Guz Khan – Man Like Mobeen as Mobeen (BBC Three)	**Sian Clifford – Fleabag as Claire (BBC Three)**; Gbemisola Ikumelo – Famalam as Various characters (BBC Three); Sarah Kendall – Frayed as Sammy Cooper (Sky); Phoebe Waller-Bridge – Fleabag as Fleabag (BBC Three)
Best Scripted Comedy	Best Comedy and Comedy Entertainment Programme
**Stath Lets Flats (Channel 4)**; Catastrophe (Channel 4); Derry Girls (Channel 4); Fleabag (BBC Three)	**Taskmaster (Dave)**; The Graham Norton Show (BBC One); The Last Leg (Channel 4); The Ranganation (BBC Two)
Best Entertainment Performance	Lew Grade Award for Entertainment Programme
**Mo Gilligan – The Lateish Show with Mo Gilligan (Channel 4)**; Frankie Boyle – Frankie Boyle's New World Order (BBC One); Lee Mack – Would I Lie to You? (BBC One); Graham Norton – The Graham Norton Show (BBC One)	**Strictly Come Dancing (BBC One)**; The Greatest Dancer (BBC One); The Rap Game UK (BBC Three); The Voice UK (ITV)
Best Factual Series or Strand	Huw Wheldon Award for Specialist Factual
**Leaving Neverland (Channel 4)**; Crime and Punishment (Channel 4); Don't F**k With Cats: Hunting an Internet Killer (Netflix); Our Dementia Choir with Vicky McClure (BBC One)	**Yorkshire Ripper Files: A Very British Crime Story (BBC Four)**; 8 Days: To the Moon and Back (BBC Two); Seven Worlds, One Planet (BBC One); Thatcher (BBC Two)
Robert Flaherty Award for Single Documentary	Best Feature
**The Last Survivors (BBC Two)**; The Abused (Channel 5); David Harewood: Psychosis and Me (BBC Two); The Family Secret (Channel 4)	**The Misadventures of Romesh Ranganathan (BBC Two)**; Joe Lycett's Got Your Back (Channel 4); Mortimer & Whitehouse (BBC Two); Snackmasters (Channel 4)
Best Reality and Constructed Factual	Best Live Event
**Race Across the World (BBC Two)**; Celebrity Gogglebox (Channel 4); Harry's Heroes: The Full English (ITV); RuPaul's Drag Race UK (BBC Three)	**Blue Planet Live (BBC One)**; Election 2019 Live: The Results (ITV); Glastonbury Festival 2019 (BBC Two); Operation Live (Channel 5)
Best News Coverage	Best Current Affairs
**Hong Kong Protests (Sky News)**; ITV News at Ten: Election Results (ITV); Prince Andrew & the Epstein Scandal (BBC Two); Victoria Derbyshire: Men Who Lost Loved Ones to Knife Crime (BBC Two)	**Undercover: Inside China's Digital Gulag (Exposure) (ITV)**; Growing Up Poor: Britain's Breadline Kids (Dispatches) (Channel 4); The Hunt for Jihadi John (HBO/Channel 4); Is Labour Anti-Semitic? (Panorama) (BBC/BBC One)
Best Sport	Best Short Form Programme
**2019 Rugby World Cup Final: England v South Africa (ITV)**; FIFA Women's World Cup 2019 Semi Final: England v USA (BBC One); ICC Cricket World Cup Final (Sky Sports Cricket); Wimbledon 2019 Men's Final (BBC One)	**Brain in Gear (BBC iPlayer)**; Anywhere but Westminster (The Guardian); Soon Gone: A Windrush Chronicle (BBC Four); Toni with an I (BBC Four)
Best International Programme	Virgin TV's Must-See Moment
**When They See Us (Netflix)**; Euphoria (HBO/Sky Atlantic); Succession (Sky Atlantic); Unbelievable (Netflix)	**Gavin & Stacey – "Nessa proposes to Smithy" (BBC One)**; Coronation Street – "Death of Sinead Osbourne" (ITV); Fleabag – "The Confessional Scene" (BBC Three); Game of Thrones – "Arya kills the Night King" (HBO/Sky Atlantic); Line of Duty – "John Corbet's death" (BBC One); Love Island – "Michael recouples after Casa Amor" (ITV2)

== Programmes with multiple nominations ==
The following is a list of programmes and networks with multiple nominations at both the 2020 British Academy Television Awards and the 2020 British Academy Television Craft Awards.

Programmes that received multiple nominations
Nominations	Programme
14	Chernobyl
7	The Crown
7	Fleabag
6	Giri/Haji
5	His Dark Materials (Note: All Craft Award nominations.)
5	The Virtues
4	Killing Eve
4	Sex Education
4	Top Boy
3	Don't F**k with Cats: Hunting an Internet Killer
3	The End of the F***ing World
3	Glastonbury 2019
3	Leaving Neverland
3	Our Planet (Note: Three different episodes each received one nomination.)
3	Seven Worlds, One Planet
3	Stath Lets Flats
2	A Confession
2	Brexit: The Uncivil War
2	Catherine the Great
2	Coronation Street
2	Elizabeth Is Missing
2	Game of Thrones
2	Gentleman Jack
2	The Graham Norton Show
2	The Last Survivors
2	Love Island
2	Responsible Child
2	The Royal British Legion Festival of Remembrance
2	Strictly Come Dancing
2	Succession
2	"Undercover: Inside China’s Digital Gulag" (Exposure episode)
2	Untouchable: The Rise and Fall of Harvey Weinstein

Networks that received multiple nominations
Nominations	Network
41	BBC One
33	Netflix
31	Channel 4
26	BBC Two
25	HBO
21	Sky Atlantic
17	ITV
12	BBC Three
7	Sony Pictures Television
3	BBC Four
2	Channel 5
2	ITV2

== Most major wins ==
The following is a list of programmes and networks with multiple wins at both the 2020 British Academy Television Awards and Television Craft Awards.

Shows that received multiple awards
Wins	Show
9	Chernobyl
3	Stath Lets Flats
2	The End of the F***ing World
2	The Last Survivors
2	Strictly Come Dancing

Wins by Network
Wins	Network
10	BBC One
10	Sky Atlantic
8	Channel 4
5	BBC Two
4	Netflix
3	ITV
2	BBC Three

== Ceremony ==
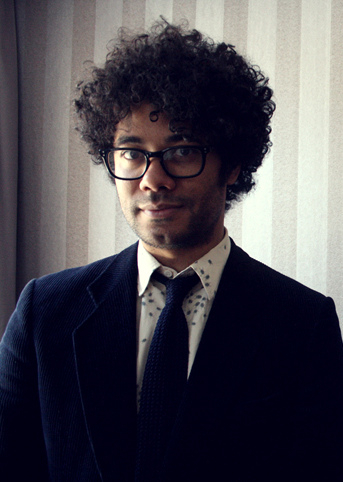
Richard Ayoade hosted the ceremony; announced in May 2020, he joked that he was "as surprised as you are that this is still going ahead".

Nominations for the 2020 British Academy Television Awards were announced on 4 June 2020. Fleabag, Chernobyl, Giri/Haji and The Crown had the most nominations. The ceremony had originally been scheduled for 17 May 2020; though it was postponed, the qualification dates for eligible programming were not changed. Krishnendu Majumdar, the chair of BAFTA since June 2020, gave an announcement that it was important to celebrate the importance of television during the COVID-19 pandemic.

The ceremony was held on 31 July 2020 from 19:00 BST, the first major award show since the start of the pandemic. It was hosted by Richard Ayoade from a studio in Television Centre, London. Several performers presented individual awards in-studio, while other presenters and all the winners and nominees contributed over video either live or pre-recorded. This led to the interesting acceptance speech of Naomi Ackie, whose immediate reaction was to text people while live on video call – something for which she was humorously berated by presenter Himesh Patel. Other presenters at the ceremony included Aisling Bea, Greg Davies, Stacey Dooley, Jessica Hynes, Daisy Edgar-Jones, Jeff Goldblum, Ruth Madeley, Paul Mescal, Chris O'Dowd, Billy Porter, Michael Sheen, Nina Sosanya, David Tennant, Kermit the Frog, and Miss Piggy. Tim Minchin composed and performed an original comedy musical number to open the ceremony and performed the song Carry You (from the TV series Upright) for the end credits. An hour-long pre-show hosted by Tom Allen had been streamed on social media prior to the ceremony. Rotten Tomatoes' editorial on the event wrote that the ceremony "held all the drama of regular awards shows, regardless of location, mostly due to some big surprises".

Surprise results included both the Best Drama and Best Scripted Comedy winners: The End of the F***ing World won drama over favourite The Crown (both Netflix), while Stath Lets Flats (Channel 4) won comedy instead of the much-celebrated Fleabag (BBC Three). Additionally, Phoebe Waller-Bridge lost Best Female Comedy Performance to her Fleabag co-star Sian Clifford. The two Fleabag stars watched the ceremony together at Waller-Bridge's house but separated on video for their nominations to prevent audio feedback. After Clifford won the award, Waller-Bridge presented her with a statuette of the "Godmother", an item in the show. During her acceptance speech, Clifford confirmed that the jury discussions for the year's awards were also done via video calls, and – speaking in the virtual backstage after winning – Clifford joked with Allen about the BAFTA award, a mask, being used as a facemask in public. Fleabag won only one award from the four for which it was nominated.

The HBO/Sky Atlantic drama Chernobyl won for two of its three nominations, having won many awards in the BAFTA Television Craft Awards held virtually earlier in the month. The two wins on top of seven at the Craft Awards increased the show's BAFTA total to a new record of nine in one year. The Best Actor winner for his role in Chernobyl, Jared Harris, said to reporters in the 'backstage' video call after his win: "[it is] incredibly generous of BAFTA, to award that many. I mean, one of the things that I've noticed about the BAFTA awards over the years is, they're pretty judicious about spreading the love". The Best Soap and Continuing Drama award was won by Emmerdale, with its executive producer Jane Hudson saying in her acceptance speech that all the soaps deserved recognition as they had already restarted shooting by the summer of 2020. As Best Actress, Glenda Jackson won her second BAFTA, having taken home her first over 25 years ago. Other winners were notably diverse, with first-time winners Will Sharpe and Naomi Ackie being named Best Supporting Actor and Actress, respectively. The BAFTA Special Award was presented to Idris Elba for his contributions in creating opportunities in the industry; the award was introduced by Taraji P. Henson, Matthew McConaughey, Ruth Wilson, and Grace Fori-Attah.

== In Memoriam ==
- Nicholas Parsons
- Sheila Mercier
- Gay Byrne
- Leah Bracknell
- Bob Angell
- Tony Britton
- Peter Sissons
- Louis Mahoney
- James Cellan Jones
- Caroline Flack
- Joe Longthorne
- Tony Garnett
- William Simons
- Derek Fowlds
- Michael Angelis
- Eddie Large
- Honor Blackman
- Jean Fergusson
- Earl Cameron
- David Bellamy
- Jill Gascoine
- Diarmuid Lawrence
- Tazeen Ahmad
- Roy Hudd
- Lynn Shelton
- Clive James
- Margarita Pracatan
- Gary Rhodes
- Lynn Faulds Wood
- Tim Brooke-Taylor
- Dame Vera Lynn

Sydney Lotterby, who died a few days before the ceremony, was not included in the montage but was named by Ayoade afterwards. The In Memoriam segment covered deaths in the 15 months since the last ceremony. A further "In Memory Of..." list, including international figures, was included on the BAFTA website.

== See also ==
- 2020 in television
- 72nd Primetime Emmy Awards
- 73rd British Academy Film Awards
- Impact of the COVID-19 pandemic on television
