= 2014 British Academy Television Craft Awards =

British awarding event

15th British Academy Television Craft Awards
- Date: 27 April 2014
- Site: The Brewery, London
- Hosted by: Stephen Mangan

The 15th Annual British Academy Television Craft Awards were presented by the British Academy of Film and Television Arts (BAFTA) on 27 April 2014, with Stephen Mangan presiding over the event. The awards were held at The Brewery, City of London, and given in recognition of technical achievements in British television of 2013.

== Winners and nominees ==
Winners are listed first and highlighted in boldface; the nominees are listed below.

Best Breakthrough Talent	Best Director - Fiction/Entertainment
**Daniel Fajemisin-Duncan, Marlon Smith** – **Run**; Nancy Harris – Dates; Dan Smith – David Attenborough’s Natural History Museum Alive 3D; Sam Leifer, Teddy Leifer – Plebs	**Otto Bathurst** – **Peaky Blinders**; James Strong – Broadchurch (for "Episode One"); Jane Campion, Garth Davis – Top of the Lake; Marc Munden – Utopia
Best Director - Factual	Best Director - Multi-Camera
**Nick Holt** – **The Murder Trial**; David Brindley, Grace Reynolds – Educating Yorkshire; Lee Phillips – Her Majesty's Prison Aylesbury; Sara Hardy, Blue Ryan – The Unspeakable Crime: Rape	**Phil Heyes** – **The X Factor**; Bridget Caldwell – The Funeral of Baroness Thatcher; Steve Smith – The Graham Norton Show; Nikki Parsons – Strictly Come Dancing
Best Writer - Comedy	Best Writer - Drama
**The IT Crowd** – **Graham Linehan**; Count Arthur Strong – Steve Delaney, Graham Linehan; Fresh Meat – Sam Bain, Jesse Armstrong, Tom Basden; The Wrong Mans – James Corden, Mathew Baynton	**Dominic Mitchell** – **In the Flesh**; Chris Chibnall – Broadchurch; Sally Wainwright – Last Tango in Halifax; Dennis Kelly – Utopia
Best Make Up and Hair Design	Best Production Design
**An Adventure in Space and Time** – **Vickie Lang**; Burton and Taylor – Lucy Cain; Da Vinci's Demons – Jacqueline Fowler; Death Comes to Pemberley – Loz Schiavo	**Ripper Street** – **Mark Geraghty**; Broadchurch – Catrin Meredydd; Burton and Taylor – John Stevenson; Peaky Blinders – Grant Montgomery
Best Original Television Music	Best Costume Design
**Broadchurch** – **Ólafur Arnalds**; Luther – Paul Englishby; Peaky Blinders – Martin Phipps; Top of the Lake – Mark Bradshaw	**Downton Abbey** – **Caroline McCall**; An Adventure in Space and Time – Suzanne Cave; Da Vinci's Demons – Annie Symons; The Suspicions of Mr Whicher: The Murder in Angel Lane – Lucinda Wright
Best Photography – Factual	Best Photography and Lighting – Fiction
**Rebuilding the World Trade Center** – **Marcus Robinson**; Africa (for "Congo") – Camera Team; Mechanical Marvels: Clockwork Dreams – Andy Jackson; Syria: Across the Lines – Olly Lambert	**Peaky Blinders** – **George Steel**; Dancing on the Edge – Ashley Rowe; Luther – John Conroy; Utopia – Ole Birkeland
Best Editing – Factual	Best Editing – Fiction
**Educating Yorkshire (for "Episode One")** – **Mark Towns**; Arena: The National Theatre (for "Part One - The Dream") – Joanna Crickmay; David Bowie – Five Years – Ged Murphy; Top Gear – Craig Harbour, James Hart, Dan James	**The Fall** – **Steve Singleton**; An Adventure in Space and Time – Philip Kloss; Broadchurch (for "Episode Eight") – Mike Jones; Top of the Lake (for "Episode Six") – Alexandre de Franceschi
Best Digital Creativity	Best Entertainment Craft Team
**D-Day: As It Happens** – **Production Team**; CBeebies Playtime – Jon Howard, Leanne Dougan, Lizzie Leadbeater, Richard Wilson; This Morning: Take Over the Makeover – Production Team; Utopia – TH_NK	**Ant & Dec's Saturday Night Takeaway** – **Patrick Doherty, Kevin Duff, Kim Gavin, Andrew Milligan**; Doctor Who at the Proms 2013 – Bernie Davis, Eryl Ellis, Huw Thomas, Keith Ware; Dynamo: Magician Impossible – Alex Hartman, Saul Gittens, Dan Evans, Amer Iqbal; Top Gear – James Hart, Dan James, Andy Hodges
Best Sound – Factual	Best Sound – Fiction
**David Bowie – Five Years** – **Rowan Jennings, Karl Mainzer, Adam Scourfield**; Africa (for "Kalahari") – Kate Hopkins, Tim Owens, Graham Wild; Britten's Endgame – Patrick Boland, Mike Hatch, Rowan Jennings, Paul Paragon; David Attenborough’s Natural History Museum Alive 3D – Freddie Claire, Graham Kirkman, John Rogerson, Richard Addis; Hebrides – Islands on the Edge – Ben Peace, Kate Hopkins, Tim Owens	**Dancing on the Edge** – **Adrian Bell, Lee Crichlow, Robert Farr, Ian Wilkinson**; The Escape Artist – Chris Ashworth, Graham Headicar, Stuart Hilliker, Duncan Price; Luther – Howard Bargroff, Russell Jeffery, Mike Grimes, Emma Pegram; Peaky Blinders – Stuart Hilliker, Brian Milliken, Matthew Skelding, Lee Walpole
Best Special, Visual and Graphic Effects
**Doctor Who (for "The Day of The Doctor")** – **Milk VFX, Real SFX, The Model Unit**; David Attenborough’s Natural History Museum Alive 3D – Zoo, Fido, Colossus; Micro Monsters with David Attenborough: Predator – Hollingworth Photography, British Technical Films, Colossus; Peaky Blinders – BlueBolt (VFX), Rushes (Colourist)

=== Special Award ===
- **Strictly Come Dancing**

== See also ==
- 2014 British Academy Television Awards
