= 2012 British Academy Television Craft Awards =

Technical achievements in television awards ceremony

13th British Academy Television Craft Awards
- Date: 13 May 2012
- Site: The Brewery, London, UK
- Hosted by: Alan Davies

The British Academy Television Craft Awards of 2012 are presented by the British Academy of Film and Television Arts (BAFTA) and were held on 13 May 2012 at The Brewery, London, the ceremony was hosted by Alan Davies.

== Winners and nominees ==
Winners will be listed first and highlighted in boldface.

Best Director - Fiction/Entertainment	Best Director - Factual
**Hugo Blick – The Shadow Line**; Julian Jarrold – Appropriate Adult; John Alexander – Exile; Yann Demange – Top Boy	**David Clews – Educating Essex**; Vanessa Berlowitz, Chadden Hunter, Kathryn Jeffs – Frozen Planet (Episode: "To the Ends of the Earth") –; Sacha Mirzoeff – Protecting Our Children; Charlie Russell – Terry Pratchett: Choosing to Die
Best Director - Multi-Camera	Best Writer
**Phil Heyes – The X Factor (Episode: "Final")**; Richard Valentine – Dancing on Ice; Ben Kellett – Mrs. Brown's Boys; Claire Popplewell – The Royal Wedding	**Steven Moffat – Sherlock (Episode: "A Scandal in Belgravia")**; Neil McKay – Appropriate Adult; Abi Morgan – Birdsong; Jack Thorne – The Fades
Best Original Television Music	Best Breakthrough Talent
**Top Boy – Brian Eno**; Downton Abbey – John Lunn; Frozen Planet – George Fenton; Great Expectations – Martin Phipps	**Kwadjo Dajan – Appropriate Adult**; Tom Basden – Fresh Meat; Stefan Golaszewski – Him and Her; Clare Johns – Panorama: The Truth About Adoption
Best Costume Design	Best Production Design
**Birdsong – Charlotte Walter**; Call the Midwife – Amy Roberts; Downton Abbey – Susannah Buxton; The Mystery of Edwin Drood – James Keast	**Great Expectations – David Roger**; Appropriate Adult – Pat Campbell; Downton Abbey – Judy Farr, Donal Woods; Black Mirror (Episode: "15 Million Merits") – Joel Collins, Daniel May
Best Make-Up and Hair Design	Best Visual Effects
**The Crimson Petal and the White – Jacqueline Fowler**; Birdsong – Emma Scott; Great Expectations – Kirstin Chalmers; This Is England '88 – Catherine Scoble	**Great Expectations – BlueBolt**; Doctor Who – The Mill; Inside the Human Body – Philip Dobree, Sophie Orde, Dan Upton; Wonders of the Universe – Burrell Durrant Hifle
Best Photography and Lighting - Fiction/Entertainment	Best Photography - Factual
**Great Expectations – Florian Hoffmeister**; The Crimson Petal and the White – Lol Crawley; The Hour – Chris Seager; Top Boy – Tat Radcliffe	**Frozen Planet (Episode: "To the Ends of the Earth") – Camera Team**; Crack House – Sean Bobbitt; Earthflight (Episode: "Europe") – Richard Cook, Christian Moullec, Michael W Richards; True Stories: Gypsy Blood – Leo Maguire
Best Editing - Fiction/Entertainment	Best Editing - Factual
**Sherlock (Episode: "A Scandal in Belgravia") – Charlie Phillips**; Birdsong – Kristina Hetherington; The Crimson Petal and the White – Luke Dunkley; Great Expectations – Victoria Boydell	**Frozen Planet (Episode: "To the Ends of the Earth") – Nigel Buck, Andy Netley, Dave Pearce**; Agony and Ecstasy: A Year with English National Ballet – Ian Davies; Japan's Tsunami Caught On Camera – Sean Mackenzie; Terry Pratchett: Choosing to Die – Gary Scott
Best Sound - Fiction/Entertainment	Best Sound - Factual
**Sherlock (Episode: "A Scandal in Belgravia") – Howard Bargroff, Jeremy Child, John Mooney, Doug Sinclair**; Birdsong – Sound Team; Great Expectations – Richard Dyer, Paul Hamblin, Stefan Henrix, Matt Skelding; * The Hour – Rudi Buckle, Jamie Caple, Marc Lawes, Nigel Squibbs	**Frozen Planet (Episode: "To the Ends of the Earth") – Kate Hopkins, Tim Owens, Graham Wild**; The Choir: Military Wives – Daniel Jones, Sam Mathewson; Rostropovich: The Genius Of The Cello – Tom O'Pray, Paul Paragon, Sam Santana; The Royal Wedding: Service In Westminster Abbey – Sound Team
Best Entertainment Craft Team	Best Digital Creativity
**The Cube – Paul Bussey, Nick Collier, Luke Halls, Annabel Raftery**; Derren Brown The Experiments: The Secret of Luck – Simon Ainge, Nick Foster, Zebedee Helm, Rachel Jury; Top Gear – Konrad Begg, Phil Churchward, Ben Joiner, Iain May; The X Factor – Dave Davey, Robert Edwards, Matt Jeffreys, Julien Rigal	**Live from The Clinic – Adam Gee, Sandra Gorel, Steph Harris, Dan Jones**; Dreams of Your Life – Lottie Davies, Alex Fleetwood, AL Kennedy, Margaret Robertson; Misfits – Matt Jarvis, Chloe Moss, Daniel Twomey, Richard Wilson; This Morning – Helen Pendlebury, Adam Vandermark, Gemma Varley, Athena Witter

=== Special awards ===
- **Aidan Farrell**

== See also ==
- 2012 British Academy Television Awards
