= 2010 British Academy Television Craft Awards =

Technical achievements in television awards ceremony

11th British Academy Television Craft Awards
- Date: 23 May 2010
- Site: Hilton Hotel, Mayfair, UK
- Hosted by: Christine Bleakley

The British Academy Television Craft Awards of 2010 are presented by the British Academy of Film and Television Arts (BAFTA) and were held on 23 May 2010 at Hilton Hotel, Mayfair, the ceremony was hosted by Christine Bleakley.

== Winners and nominees ==
Winners will be listed first and highlighted in boldface.

Best Director - Fiction/Entertainment	Best Director - Factual
**Philip Martin – Mo**; Yann Demange – Criminal Justice; James Hawes – Enid; Aisling Walsh – Wallander (Episode: "The Fifth Woman")	**Patrick Forbes – The Force**; Annabel Gillings – How Earth Made Us (Episode: "Water"); Nick Read – Dispatches (Episode: "The Slumdog Children of Mumbai"); Dan Reed – Dispatches (Episode: "Terror in Mumbai")
Best Writer	Best Breakthrough Talent
**Guy Hibbert – Five Minutes of Heaven**; Peter Bowker – Occupation; Writing Team – The Thick of It; Heidi Thomas – Cranford	**Jessie Versluys – The Hospital/Katie: My Beautiful Face**; Ed Hime – Skins; Matt Rudge – The Autistic Me; Ed Wardle – Alone in the Wild
Best Original Television Music	Best Make-Up and Hair Design
**Small Island – Martin Phipps**; Red Riding 1974 – Adrian Johnston; Moses Jones – Craig Pruess; Being Human – Richard Wells	**Mo – Christina Baker**; The Impressions Show with Culshaw and Stephenson – Lucy Cain; Enid – Lisa Cavelli-Green; Red Riding 1974 – Jacqueline Fowler
Best Costume Design	Best Production Design
**Red Riding 1974 – Natalie Ward**; An Englishman in New York – Joey Attawia; Cranford – Jenny Beavan; Desperate Romantics – James Keast	**Gracie! – Claire Kenny**; Wallander – Jacqueline Abrahams; Red Riding 1974 – Christina Casali; An Englishman in New York – Beth Mickle
Best Photography and Lighting - Fiction/Entertainment	Best Photography - Factual
**Red Riding 1974 – David Higgs**; Desperate Romantics – Alan Almond; Small Island – Tony Miller; Hamlet – Chris Seager; Garrow's Law – Lukas Strebel; Wallander – Lukas Strebel	**Yellowstone (Episode: "Winter") – Camera Team**; How Earth Made Us – Camera Team; Life (Episode: "Insects") – Rod Clarke, Kevin Flay; Andrew Marr's The Making of Modern Britain – Neil Harvey; Dispatches (Episode: "The Slumdog Children of Mumbai") – Nick Read
Best Editing - Fiction/Entertainment	Best Editing - Factual
**Mo – Kristina Hetherington**; Occupation – Victoria Boydell; Red Riding 1974 – Andrew Hulme; A Short Stay in Switzerland – Adam Recht; Criminal Justice – Chris Wyatt	**The Secret Life of The Berlin Wall – Gregor Lyon**; Life (Episode: "Birds") – Jo Payne; Dispatches (Episode: "The Slumdog Children of Mumbai") – Jay Taylor; Top Gear – Team
Best Sound - Fiction/Entertainment	Best Sound - Factual
**Wallander – Paul Hamblin, Andre Schmidt, Catherine Hodgson, Bosse Persson**; Red Riding 1974 – Paul Cotterell, Danny Hambrook, Kallis Shamaris; Cranford – Paul Hamblin, Peter Brill, Iain Eyre, Lee Walpole; Spooks – Nigel Heath, Darren Banks, Laura Lovejoy, Rudi Buckle	**Trawlermen – George Foulgham, Lisa Marie McStay, Kiff McManus, Dafydd Baines**; 9/11: Phone Calls from The Towers – Ben Baird, Adam Wilks, Ben Lester, Merce Williams; Nature's Great Events (Episode: "The Great Feast") – Paul Cowgill, Kate Hopkins, Andrew Wilson, Graham Wild; Life (Episode: "Insects") – Chris Domaille, Graham Wild, Tim Owens, Kate Hopkins
Best Visual Effects	Best Titles
**The Day of the Triffids – Tom Turnbull, Joel Collins, Rene Morel**; World War II in Colour – Alan Griffiths, Matthew Barrett, Vivek Rao; Merlin – The Mill; Doctor Who – The Mill	**BBC Winter Olympics – Marc Craste, Damon Collins, Tim McNaughton, Freddy Mandy**; Misfits – Miki Kato, Nic Benns; Formula 1 – Liquid TV; Cast Offs – Victor Martinez, Joel Wilson
Best Entertainment Production Team	BBC Blast and BAFTA Screen-Skills Award
**The X Factor**; The Apprentice; Britain's Got Talent; Top Gear	**Sam Shetabi**; Harriet Beaney; Jack Crocker; Joe Reed
Best Interactive Creative Contribution
**Embarrassing Bodies/Embarrassing Bodies Live – Production Team**; Who Killed Summer? – Bigballs Films, MWorks, Hideous Productions; The Apprentice: Predictor – Robert Marsh, Oliver Davies, Simon Brickle; Science of Scams – Anthony Owen, Anthony Waldron, Vanessa Arden-Wood

=== Special awards ===
- **Coronation Street**

== See also ==
- 2010 British Academy Television Awards
