= 2007 British Academy Television Craft Awards =

Technical achievements in television awards ceremony

8th British Academy Television Craft Awards
- Date: 22 April 2007
- Site: The Dorchester, Mayfair, UK
- Hosted by: Jon Snow

The British Academy Television Craft Awards of 2007 are presented by the British Academy of Film and Television Arts (BAFTA) and were held on 22 April 2007 at The Dorchester, Mayfair, the ceremony was hosted by Jon Snow.

== Winners and nominees ==
Winners will be listed first and highlighted in boldface.

Best Director	Best Writer
**Edmund Coulthard – Soundproof**; Tom Hooper – Longford; Bharat Nalluri – Life on Mars; Adrian Shergold – Low Winter Sun	**Peter Morgan – Longford**; Frank Deasy – Prime Suspect (Episode: "The Final Act"); Ricky Gervais, Stephen Merchant – Extras; Matthew Graham – Life on Mars
Best Breakthrough Talent	Best Original Television Music
**Sharon Foster – Shoot the Messenger**; Neil Biswas – Bradford Riots; Brian Fillis – Fear of Fanny; Nick Holt – Guys And Dolls	**Prime Suspect (Episode: "The Final Act") – Nicholas Hooper**; Planet Earth – George Fenton; Tsunami: The Aftermath – Alex Heffes; Jane Eyre – Rob Lane
Best New Media Developer	Best Make-Up and Hair Design
**Me: TV – Peter Drake, Jon Donaldson, Mark Owen**; Get Cooking – BBC Food and Illumina Digital; Breaking The News – Davie McGirr and Production Team; BBC Sport: World Cup – Sport Production Team	**Jane Eyre – Anne 'Nosh' Oldham**; Housewife, 49 – Carol Cooper; A Harlot's Progress – Emma Scott; The Catherine Tate Show – Vanessa White, Neill Gorton
Best Costume Design	Best Production Design
**The Virgin Queen – Amy Roberts**; A Harlot's Progress – David Blight; Fear of Fanny – Emma Fryer; The Ruby in the Smoke – James Keast	**An Audience With Take That... Live! – Bill Laslett**; Jane Eyre – Grenville Horner; Longford – Michael Pickwoad; Life on Mars – Bryan Sykes
Best Photography and Lighting - Fiction/Entertainment	Best Photography - Factual
**Shoot the Messenger – David Katznelson**; Longford – Danny Cohen; Tsunami: The Aftermath – John de Borman; Terry Pratchett's Hogfather – Gavin Finney	**Simon Schama's Power of Art – Tim Cragg**; Galápagos – Camera Team; Planet Earth – Camera Team; Breaking Up with The Joneses – Ursula MacFarlane, Saskia Wilson
Best Editing - Fiction/Entertainment	Best Editing - Factual
**Longford – Melanie Oliver**; Doctor Who – Crispin Green; Life on Mars – Barney Pilling; Prime Suspect (Episode: "The Final Act") – Trevor Waite	**Rain In My Heart – Dave King**; Nuremberg: Nazis on Trial – Ben Giles; Breaking Up with The Joneses – Gregor Lyon; 9/11: The Twin Towers – Peter Parnham
Best Sound - Fiction/Entertainment	Best Sound - Factual
**Tsunami: The Aftermath – Sound Team**; Strictly Come Dancing – Gary Clarke; Later with Jools Holland – Mike Felton; Life on Mars – Sound Team	**9/11: The Twin Towers – Peter Baldock, Tim White, Cliff Jones**; Breaking Up with the Joneses – Ben Baird, Ursula MacFarlane, Saskia Wilson; The Somme: From Defeat to Victory – Danny Finn; Planet Earth – Andrew Wilson, Kate Hopkins, Tim Owens, Graham Wild
Best Visual Effects	Best Titles
**Terry Pratchett's Hogfather – Simon Thomas, Oliver Money**; Death of a President – Lola; Krakatoa: The Last Days – Lola, The Model Unit; Doctor Who – The Mill	**Match of the Day: FIFA World Cup 2006 – Mark Walters, Chris Grubb, Louise Braham**; Hotel Babylon – Richard Norley, Russell Mann; Suburban Shootout – Alan O'Brien, Anthony Scott, Lynn Nealon; England One Day Internationals – Christopher Wilcock, Richard Vowles, Andrew Paraskos
Best Interactive Innovation
**Four Docs – Magic Lantern Productions**; Dispatches: War Torn - Stories Of Separation – Channel 4 War Torn Production Team; A Conversation with Sir Ian – Martin Percy; CDX – Preloaded, BBC History

=== Special awards ===
- **Sydney Lotterby**

== See also ==
- 2007 British Academy Television Awards
