= Adrian Johnston (musician) =

British musician

- Born: 1961 (age 64–65)
- Origin: Lancashire, United Kingdom
- Genres: Film and television scores, experimental, ambient, drone, electronic, synthwave
- Occupations: Musician, composer
- Instruments: Keyboards, synthesizer, drums
- Years active: 1996-present

Adrian Johnston (born 1961) is an English musician and composer for film and television scores, who resides in London and Samois-sur-Seine.

== Early life and education ==
Born in the county of Lancashire, Johnston attended the University of Edinburgh, studying English. He has been a drummer in bands including Moles for Breakfast, The Waterboys, the Wanglers, Combo Zombo, and The Mike Flowers Pops.

== Career ==
During his twenties, Johnston travelled the world providing music accompaniment to silent films at film festivals. He later scored productions for the Royal National Theatre and the Royal Shakespeare Company.

Johnston's first film score was for the 1996 Thomas Hardy adaptation Jude. He has also composed original scores for The Turn of the Screw (1999), Becoming Jane, a 2007 film about Jane Austen, and the 2008 adaptation of Evelyn Waugh's Brideshead Revisited. In 2008, he was awarded a BAFTA for the score of the BBC film Capturing Mary.

Johnston's score for Charles Sturridge's mini-series Shackleton won a 2002 Primetime Emmy. In 2009, he scored the British science-fiction procedural TV series Paradox. He composed the theme music for the BBC detective series Zen, which won him a 2011 RTS Awards; the World War II drama The Sinking of the Laconia; Stephen Poliakoff's acclaimed 2013 TV series Dancing on the Edge; and the drama The 7.39. Johnston won another RTS award in 2014 for scoring The Tunnel.
