= 2009 British Academy Television Craft Awards =

Technical achievements in television awards ceremony

10th British Academy Television Craft Awards
- Date: 17 May 2009
- Site: Hilton Hotel, Mayfair, UK
- Hosted by: Alexander Armstrong

The British Academy Television Craft Awards of 2009 are presented by the British Academy of Film and Television Arts (BAFTA) and were held on 17 May 2009 at Hilton Hotel, Mayfair, the ceremony was hosted by Alexander Armstrong.

== Winners and nominees ==
Winners will be listed first and highlighted in boldface.

Best Director - Fiction/Entertainment	Best Director - Factual
**Rowan Joffé – The Shooting of Thomas Hurndall**; Otto Bathurst – Criminal Justice; Alex Holmes – House of Saddam; Niall MacCormick – Margaret Thatcher: The Long Walk to Finchley	**Morgan Matthews – The Fallen**; Amanda Blue – Prescott: The Class System and Me; Jonathan Smith – The Family; Stephen Walker – A Boy Called Alex
Best Writer	Best Breakthrough Talent
**Peter Moffat – Criminal Justice**; Sam Bain, Jesse Armstrong – Peep Show; Simon Block – The Shooting of Thomas Hurndall; Russell T Davies – Doctor Who (Episode: "Midnight")	**Daniel Vernon – Wonderland: The Man Who Eats Badgers**; Charlie Brooker – Dead Set; Alison Millar – The Father, The Son and The Housekeeper; Tony Saint – Margaret Thatcher: The Long Walk to Finchley
Best Original Television Music	Best Make-Up and Hair Design
**Wallander – Martin Phipps**; Spooks – Paul Leonard-Morgan; Little Dorrit – John Lunn; Sense and Sensibility – Martin Phipps	**Miss Austen Regrets – Christine Walmesley-Cotham**; Margaret Thatcher: The Long Walk to Finchley – Christine Allsopp; Little Dorrit – Karen Hartley-Thomas; House of Saddam – Marella Shearer
Best Costume Design	Best Production Design
**The Devil's Whore – Michele Clapton**; House of Saddam – Alexandra Caulfield; In Love with Barbara – Natalie Humphries; Little Dorrit – Barbara Kidd	**Wallander – Jacqueline Abrahams**; The Curse of Steptoe – Patrick Bill; The Devil's Whore – Rob Harris; Little Dorrit – James Merifield
Best Photography and Lighting - Fiction/Entertainment	Best Photography - Factual
**Wallander – Anthony Dod Mantle**; The Devil's Whore – Julian Court; House of Saddam – Florian Hoffmeister; White Girl – Wojciech Szepel	**A History of Scotland – Neville Kidd**; The Victorian Sex Explorer – Roger Chapman; Amazon with Bruce Parry – Matt Norman; Ross Kemp in Afghanistan – Andrew Thompson
Best Editing - Fiction/Entertainment	Best Editing - Factual
**Doctor Who – Philip Kloss**; Criminal Justice – Sarah Brewerton; Margaret Thatcher: The Long Walk to Finchley – Anthony Combes; White Girl – Una Ni Dhonghaile	**The Fallen – Joby Gee**; The Family – Ben Brown, Marc Davies; True Stories: Thriller in Manila – Nick Packer; A Boy Called Alex – Ben Stark
Best Sound - Fiction/Entertainment	Best Sound - Factual
**Wallander – Bosse Persson, Lee Crichlow, Iain Eyre, Paul Hamblin**; Little Dorrit – Rudi Buckle, Colin Chapman, Ross Adams, Richard Street; Spooks – James Feltham, Darren Banks, Ben Norrington, Glenn Marullo; God on Trial – Brian Milliken, Nigel Heath, Darren Banks, Alex Sawyer	**Ross Kemp in Afghanistan – James Snowden, Nick Fry**; Louis Theroux: Behind Bars – Bob Jackson, James Baker; The Family – Sound Team; Wimbledon 2008 Men's Final – Sound Team
Best Visual Effects	Best Titles
**Doctor Who (Episode: "The Fires of Pompeii") – The Mill**; Primeval – Christian Manz, Matt Fox, Mark Brocking; The Wrong Door – VFX Team; The Colour of Magic – Simon Thomas, Reuben Barkataki, Dave Throssell	**Olympics 2008 – Sport Team**; No.1 Ladies' Detective Agency – Airside; Wallander – Title Film And Television; Football League – Adam Wells, Jason Landau, Mark Blackwood
Best Interactive Creative Contribution	Best Interactive Innovation - Service/Platform
**Dead Set – Will Clark, Chris Hassell, Stuart Holton**; Year Dot – Jeremy Salsby, Colin Hancock, James Kirkham; Discover: Online Tour – Team; Toyboize – Team	**Mi Vida Loca: Real Spanish, Real Drama – Team**; Sky Player – Team; BBC Automated Programme Support – Team; Battlefront – Lucy Willis, Debbie Searle, Chris Mair

=== Special awards ===
- **Aardman Animations**

== See also ==
- 2009 British Academy Television Awards
