= Once Upon a Time in Northern Ireland =

British documentary series

- Poster
- Genre: Documentary
- Directed by: James Bluemel, Sian Mcilwaine
- Country of origin: United Kingdom
- Original language: English
- No. of series: 1
- No. of episodes: 5

Production
- Executive producers: Will Anderson; Andrew Palmer
- Producers: Vicky Mitchell, Rachel Hooper, Sian Mcilwaine, Stewart Armstrong, Louise Duffy
- Running time: 318 minutes (BBC)
- Production company: KEO Films Walk on Air Films BBC The Open University PBS

Original release
- Network: BBC Two
- Release: 22 May – 19 June 2023

Once Upon a Time in Northern Ireland is a 2023 British documentary television miniseries covering the Northern Irish conflict, the Troubles. Directed by James Bluemel as a follow-up to his 2020 series Once Upon a Time in Iraq, it consists of five episodes that features interviews with members of Republican and Loyalist paramilitaries, members of the British Army who served in Northern Ireland, along with others caught up in the conflict.

== Overview ==
The series chronologically covers the Troubles from its early beginnings emerging from the 1960s civil rights movement in Northern Ireland into the following three decades of armed conflict in the region between those fighting for a united Ireland and those fighting to remain part of the United Kingdom through to the Good Friday Agreement and beyond. The first episode was broadcast in the United Kingdom on BBC Two on 22 May 2023.

== Reception ==
Once Upon a Time in Northern Ireland received acclaim from critics within the UK. The Guardian wrote of how "by marking how the Troubles affected individuals, Once Upon a Time in Northern Ireland finds profound wider truths". The Daily Telegraph gave it five stars out of five, praising it as "a superb piece of work, not merely a litany of horrors but an opportunity for those involved to look back". The Financial Times also gave the series five stars, saying it was "of vital importance to those involved, and necessary viewing for those who were not". Rachel Cooke in The New Statesman threw praise on the series, declaring that it "may be the best television ever made about Northern Ireland."

The series also received positive reviews from foreign outlets. In the Los Angeles Times, Robert Lloyd praised how the series focused on how those interviewed "grapple with who they were then from the standpoint of who they are now". Reviewing the first episode for the Irish Examiner, Pat Fitzpatrick regarded it as "mesmerising", and the "narrative time-shifts" as elegant.
