= 2011 British Academy Television Craft Awards =

Technical achievements in television awards ceremony

12th British Academy Television Craft Awards
- Date: 8 May 2011
- Site: The Brewery, London, UK
- Hosted by: Stephen Mangan

The British Academy Television Craft Awards of 2011 are presented by the British Academy of Film and Television Arts (BAFTA) and were held on 8 May 2011 at The Brewery, London, the ceremony was hosted by Stephen Mangan.

== Winners and nominees ==
Winners will be listed first and highlighted in boldface.

Best Director - Fiction/Entertainment	Best Director - Factual
**Brian Percival – Downton Abbey**; Paul McGuigan – Sherlock (Episode: "A Study in Pink"); Shane Meadows – This Is England '86; Charles Sturridge – The Road to Coronation Street	**Dan Reed – Dispatches (Episode: "The Battle for Haiti")**; Gideon Bradshaw, Paul Olding – Wonders of the Solar System (Episode: "Empire of the Sun"); Nicolas Brown – Human Planet (Episode: "Arctic – Life in the Deep Freeze"); Chris Holt – Wonders of the Solar System (Episode: "The Thin Blue Line")
Best Director - Multi-Camera	Best Writer
**Tony Prescott – Coronation Street - Live Episode**; Jonathan Bullen – The X Factor; Juliet May – Miranda; Nikki Parsons – Strictly Come Dancing	**Peter Bowker – Eric and Ernie**; Jo Brand, Joanna Scanlan, Vicki Pepperdine – Getting On; Stephen Butchard – Five Daughters; Iain Morris, Damon Beesley – The Inbetweeners
Best Original Television Music	Best Breakthrough Talent
**Any Human Heart – Dan Jones**; Sherlock (Episode: "A Study in Pink") – David Arnold, Michael Price; Terry Pratchett's Going Postal – John Lunn; Misfits – Vince Pope	**Jon Brown – Mongrels**; Caroline Skinner – Five Days; Dave Whyte – Pete versus Life; Aaron Young – Battle of Britain: The Real Story
Best Costume Design	Best Production Design
**Worried About the Boy – Annie Symons**; Eric and Ernie – Joanna Eatwell; Any Human Heart – Charlotte Holdich; This Is England '86 – Charlotte Walter	**Misfits – Tom Bowyer**; Eric and Ernie – Pat Campbell; Downton Abbey – Donal Woods; Sherlock (Episode: "A Study in Pink") – Arwel Wyn Jones
Best Make-Up and Hair Design	Best Visual Effects
**This Is England '86 – Catherine Scoble**; Eric and Ernie – Christina Baker; Any Human Heart – Karen Hartley-Thomas; Psychoville – Penny Smith	**Merlin – The Mill**; Wonders of the Solar System – Simon Clarke, Stephen Waugh; Doctor Who – The Mill; Terry Pratchett's Going Postal – Simon Thomas, Reuben Barkataki, Zoltan Benyó
Best Photography and Lighting - Fiction/Entertainment	Best Photography - Factual
**South Riding – Alan Almond**; Terry Pratchett's Going Postal – Gavin Finney; Downton Abbey – David Katznelson; Five Daughters – Chris Seager; Any Human Heart – Wojciech Szepel	**Human Planet (Episode: "Arctic – Life in the Deep Freeze") – Will Edwards, Doug Allan, Matt Norman**; Human Planet (Episode: "Oceans – Into the Blue") – Simon Enderby, Robin Cox, Richard Wollocombe; David Attenborough's First Life – Pete Hayns, Paul Williams; Human Planet (Episode: "Jungles – People of the Trees") – Gavin Thurston, Robin Cox, Pete Hayns
Best Editing - Fiction/Entertainment	Best Editing - Factual
**Sherlock (Episode: "A Study in Pink") – Charlie Phillips**; Eric and Ernie – Jamie Pearson; Downton Abbey – John Wilson; This Is England '86 – Chris Wyatt	**Human Planet (Episode: "Arctic – Life in the Deep Freeze") – Jason Savage**; Dispatches (Episode: "The Battle for Haiti") – Peter Haddon; Wonders of the Solar System (Episode: "Empire of the Sun") – Darren Jonusas; David Attenborough's First Life – Peter Miller; Concorde's Last Flight – Peter Norrey
Best Sound - Fiction/Entertainment	Best Sound - Factual
**Downton Abbey – Nigel Heath, Alex Sawyer, Adam Armitage, Mark Holding**; South Riding – Alistair Crocker, Paul Hamblin, Alex Ellerington, Jeff Richardson; The Promise – Graham Headicar, Stuart Hilliker, Matt Skelding, Simon Clark; Mad Dogs – Adrian Rhodes, Reg Mills, Ben Norrington; Any Human Heart – Sound Team	**Elgar: The Man Behind the Mask – Paul Paragon, Jez Spencer, Mike Hatch**; Human Planet (Episode: "Oceans – Into the Blue") – Martyn Harries, Kate Hopkins; Human Planet (Episode: "Jungles – People of the Trees") – Willow Murton, Kate Hopkins, Mark Ferda, Rachael Kinley; Top Gear: Middle East Special – Sound Team
Best Entertainment Craft Team	Best Digital Creativity
**The Cube – Barry Osment, Nick Foster, Peter Johnston, Julian Healy**; The X Factor – Robert Edwards, Dave Davey, Simon Tyers, Florian Wieder; Strictly Come Dancing – Su Judd, Patrick Doherty, Mark Kenyon, Lisa Armstrong; The Apprentice – Mark Saben, Andy Devonshire, Stephen Day, James Clarke	**The Million Pound Drop Live – Nick Hall, Luc Houselander, Simon Brickle, Jody Smith**; The Big Fish Fight – Will Anderson, Jo Haslam, Simon Deverell, Murry Toms; Misfits – Matt Jarvis, Chloe Moss, Owen Priestly, Carl Hodler; This Morning – Ritchie Wilkinson, Hayley Jones, John Palmer, Helen Pendlebury

=== Special awards ===
- **Springwatch**

== See also ==
- 2011 British Academy Television Awards
