= 2016 British Academy Television Craft Awards =

Technical achievements in television awards ceremony

17th British Academy Television Craft Awards
- Date: 24 April 2016
- Site: The Brewery, London
- Hosted by: Stephen Mangan

The 17th Annual British Academy Television Craft Awards were presented by the British Academy of Film and Television Arts (BAFTA) on 24 April 2016, with Stephen Mangan hosting the event for the fourth year in a row. The awards were held at The Brewery, City of London, and given in recognition of technical achievements in British television of 2015.

== Winners and nominees ==
Winners are listed first and highlighted in boldface; the nominees are listed below.

Best Breakthrough Talent	Best Director - Fiction/Entertainment
**Michaela Coel** – **Chewing Gum**; D. C. Moore – Not Safe for Work; Guillem Morales – Inside No. 9; Marcus Plowright – Muslim Drag Queens	**Shane Meadows** – **This Is England '90**; Aisling Walsh – An Inspector Calls; Ben Taylor – Catastrophe; Jakob Verbruggen – London Spy
Best Director - Factual	Best Director - Multi-Camera
**Dave Nath** – **The Murder Detectives**; Adam Jessel – Professor Green: Suicide and Me; James Newton – The Detectives; Ursula Macfarlane – Charlie Hebdo: Three Days That Shook Paris	**Richard Valentine, Coky Giedroyc** – **The Sound Of Music Live!**; Chris Power – Ant and Dec's Saturday Night Takeaway; John Anderson – Coronation Street; John Watts – Rugby World Cup Final: New Zealand V Australia
Best Writer - Comedy	Best Writer - Drama
**Rob Delaney, Sharon Horgan** – **Catastrophe**; Jesse Armstrong, Sam Bain – Peep Show; Julia Davis, Barunka O'Shaughnessy – Hunderby; Writing Team – Peter Kay's Car Share	**Russell T Davies** – **Cucumber**; Mike Bartlett – Doctor Foster; Neil Cross – Luther; Peter Straughan – Wolf Hall
Best Make Up and Hair Design	Best Production Design
**The Dresser** – **Jenny Shircore**; Jonathan Strange & Mr Norrell – Emilie Gauthier, Joyce Dean; Penny Dreadful – Enzo Mastrantonio, Nick Dudman, Ferdinando Merolla; Wolf Hall – Roseann Samuel	**Jonathan Strange & Mr Norrell** – **David Roger**; Fortitude – Gemma Jackson; This Is England '90 – Janey Levick; Dickensian – Michael Ralph
Best Original Television Music	Best Costume Design
**The Hunt** – **Steven Price**; Poldark – Anne Dudley; Thunderbirds Are Go – Ben Foster, Nick Foster; Broadchurch – Ólafur Arnalds	**The Dresser** – **Fotini Dimou**; Jonathan Strange & Mr Norrell – Barbara Kidd; Wolf Hall – Joanna Eatwell; Poldark – Marianne Agertoft
Best Photography – Factual	Best Photography and Lighting – Fiction
**Camera Team** – **The Hunt**; Andrew Muggleton – Handmade: Metal; Ben Steele – The Children Who Beat Ebola; Pete Hayns, Mark Payne-Gill, Luke Barnett – Big Cats: An Amazing Animal Family	**London Spy** – **Laurie Rose**; Wolf Hall – Gavin Finney; The Frankenstein Chronicles – Ian Moss; Fortitude – John Conroy
Best Editing – Factual	Best Editing – Fiction
**The Murder Detectives** – **Ben Brown**; Great Barrier Reef with David Attenborough – Dominic Lester; Charlie Hebdo: Three Days That Shook Paris – James Clarkson Lyon; My Son the Jihadi – Simon McMahon	**Wolf Hall** – **David Blackmore**; An Inspector Calls – Alex Mackie; Humans – Daniel Greenway; This Is England '90 – Matthew Gray; London Spy – Victoria Boydell
Best Digital Creativity	Best Entertainment Craft Team
**Humans** – **Development Team**; I'm A Celebrity... Get Me Out of Here! – Athena Witter, Barry Hayter, Teresa Pegrum, Liam Dalley; The Last Hours of Laura K – Gabriel Bisset-Smith, Rachel De-lahay, Kenny Emson, Ed Sellek; Two Billion Miles – Mike Smith, Felix Renicks, Kieron Bryan, Harry Horton	**The Sound Of Music Live!** – **Zac Nicholson, Tomas Burton, Edward K. Gibbon, Jacquetta Levon**; A League of Their Own – Andrew Norgate, Aiden Spackman, Kevin Day, Kevin Duff; The Apprentice – James Clarke, Mark Owen, John Featherstone, Ian Hughes; Strictly Come Dancing – Jason Gilkison, Mark Kenyon, Tony Revell, Dave Newton
Best Sound – Factual	Best Sound – Fiction
**VE Day 70: The Nation Remembers** – **Andy James, Andy Payne, Andy Groves, Julian Pasqua**; The Naked Choir with Gareth Malone – Daniel Jones, Gareth Malone, Conrad Fletcher, Mat Wood; Great Barrier Reef with David Attenborough – John Rogerson, Richard Addis, Ryan Twyman, Freddie Claire; La Traviata: Love, Death and Divas – Matt Skilton, Mike Hatch, Tony Burke	**Wolf Hall** – **Sound Team**; The Enfield Haunting – Adrian Rhodes, Simon Farmer, Jamie Roden, Antony Bayman; The Sound Of Music Live! – Kevin Duff, Andy Deacon, Sally Hesketh, Ben Milton; Fortitude – Rudi Buckle, Phil Barnes, Blair Jollands, Howard Bargroff; London Spy – Scott Jones, Robert Brazier, Joseph Stracey, Ian Voigt; Doctor Foster – Stuart Hilliker, Jim Goddard, Billy Quinn, Tom Deane
Best Titles	Best Special, Visual and Graphic Effects
**Fortitude** – **MOMOCO**; Murder in Successville – Edward Tracy; Luther – Nic Benns, Miki Kato; The Last Kingdom – Paul McDonnell, Ben Hanbury, Hugo Moss	**Jonathan Strange & Mr Norrell** – **Milk VFX**; The Last Kingdom – BlueBolt; Fungus the Bogeyman – DNeg TV, Chris Rodgers; Doctor Who – Milk VFX, Millennium FX, Real SFX, Molinare

=== Special Award ===
- **Nina Gold**

== See also ==
- 2016 British Academy Television Awards
