= Al Jazeera (disambiguation) =

Al Jazeera Media Network (shortened to just Al Jazeera) is a Qatari private media conglomerate.

Al Jazeera or Aljazeera may also refer to:

- Several subsidiaries of Al Jazeera Media Network:
  - Al Jazeera English, international English language news channel
  - Al Jazeera Arabic, Qatari state-funded Arabic television channel
  - Al Jazeera Balkans, television channel for the Balkans region
  - Al Jazeera Mubasher, international Arabic language pan-regional public affairs network
  - Al Jazeera America, American pay television news channel (defunct)
- Al Jazeera effect, the impact of new media and media sources on global politics
- Al Jazeera English awards, list of awards from organizations across the globe.
- Aljazeera Publishing, defunct publisher of Aljazeera Magazine, unrelated to Al Jazeera Media Network
  - Aljazeera Magazine, a defunct magazine published by Aljazeera Publishing
  - Aljazeera.com, the former website of Aljazeera Magazine
- Al-Jazeera SC (Amman), a football club in Jordan
- Al-Jazeera SC (Syria), a football club in Syria
- Aljazeera SC, a football club in Libya
- Al Jazeera SC, a sports club located in Mersa Matruh, Egypt
- Al Jazirah Al Hamra Club, a football club in the United Arab Emirates
- Gezira State, also spelt Al Jazeera, state in Sudan

== See also ==
- Jazira (disambiguation)
