= Jazira =

Jazira, al-Jazira, Jazeera, al-Jazeera, etc. are all transcriptions of Arabic الجزيرة meaning "the island" or "the peninsula".

The term may refer to:

== Business ==
- Jazeera Airways, an airlines company based in Kuwait

== Locations ==
- Al-Jazira, a traditional Arabic name for Upper Mesopotamia
- Cizre District in Turkey
- Al-Jazira (caliphal province), an Umayyad and Abbasid province encompassing Upper Mesopotamia in modern Syria, Iraq and Turkey.
  - Al-Jazira Province, former Syrian province
  - Jazira Region, an autonomous Syrian region
- al-jazīrah al-ʻarabīyah, the Arabian Peninsula
- Al Jazirah, Sharjah, United Arab Emirates
- Algeria (Berber: ⴷⵣⴰⵢⴻⵔ Dzayer from Arabic: الجزائر al-Jazā'ir) North Africa
- Algiers, the capital city of Algeria
- Al Jazirah (state), Sudan
- Gezira (Cairo), island in Egypt
- Gezir, town in Iran
- Algeciras, Spain
- Ciutadella de Menorca (Madina al Jazira), Minorca, Balearic Islands
- Alzira, Valencia, Spain
- Lezíria do Tejo, Portugal
- Gżira, a town in Malta
- Cizre, Turkey
- Zalzala Koh or Zalzala Jazeera, Pakistan
- St. Martin's Island, Bangladesh
- Jazeera Beach, Somalia

== Media ==
- Al Jazeera Media Network
  - Al Jazeera Arabic, an Arabic language news television channel
  - Al Jazeera America, the network's American national news channel
  - Al Jazeera Balkans, the network's Balkans regional news channel
  - Al Jazeera English, the English language global news channel
  - Al Jazeera Türk, the network's defunct Turkish news website
  - Al Jazeera Mubasher, international Arabic language pan-regional public affairs network
- Aljazeera Publishing, defunct publisher of Aljazeera Magazine
  - Aljazeera Magazine, a defunct magazine published by Aljazeera Publishing
  - Aljazeera.com, the former website of Aljazeera Magazine
- Al Jazirah (newspaper), a Saudi daily newspaper

== Sports ==
- Al Jazira Club, a sports team in Abu Dhabi, United Arab Emirates
- Al-Jazira FC, a Kuwaiti Football Club.
- Al-Jazeera (Jordan), a football club in Jordan
- Al Jazirah Al Hamra Club, a football club in the United Arab Emirates
- Al-Jazeera SC (Syria), a football club in Syria
- Aljazeera Sports Club, a football club in Libya
- Al Jazeera SC, a sports club located in Mersa Matruh, Egypt
- Gezira Sporting Club, a sports club located in Cairo, Egypt
  - Gezira (basketball club), a basketball club located in Cairo, Egypt

== See also ==
- Janjira (disambiguation), jazira in Indic languages
- Al Jazeera (disambiguation)
