= Mehdi Hasan =

British-American journalist (born 1979)

- Hasan at the 2026 Status Summit
- Born: Mehdi Raza Hasan; 10 July 1979 (age 47); Swindon, Wiltshire, England
- Citizenship: United Kingdom; United States (since 2020)
- Education: Merchant Taylors' School; Christ Church, Oxford (BA)
- Occupations: Broadcaster; journalist; writer
- Organisations: The Intercept; The Huffington Post; Al Jazeera English; Peacock; MSNBC
- Known for: Zeteo
- Notable work: Ed: The Milibands and the Making of a Labour Leader (2012); Win Every Argument (2023)
- Television: The Café, Head to Head, UpFront, The Mehdi Hasan Show
- Children: 2

Mehdi Raza Hasan (Note: /ˈmɛdi ˈhʌsən/ MED-ee HUSS-ən) (born 10 July 1979) is a British-American broadcaster, journalist, progressive political commentator, and founder of the media company Zeteo. He presented The Mehdi Hasan Show on Peacock from October 2020 and on MSNBC from February 2021 until the show's cancellation in November 2023.

A graduate of Christ Church, Oxford, Hasan began his television career as a researcher and then producer on ITV's Jonathan Dimbleby programme. Following a stint on the BBC's The Politics Show, he became deputy executive producer on Sky's breakfast show Sunrise before moving to Channel 4 as their editor of news and current affairs. In 2009, he was appointed senior editor for politics at the New Statesman. In 2012, he became a presenter on Al Jazeera English, and in 2015, he moved to Washington, D.C., to work full-time for Al Jazeera on UpFront and host the Deconstructed podcast produced by the online publication The Intercept from 2018 to 2020.

Hasan is the author of Win Every Argument and the co-author of a biography of former Labour Party leader Ed Miliband. He was formerly the political editor of the UK edition of The Huffington Post and the presenter of the Al Jazeera English shows The Café, Head to Head, and UpFront. After departing MSNBC, Hasan joined The Guardian as a columnist and created the digital media company Zeteo in February 2024, and returned as host of Head to Head in June that year.

== Early life and education ==
Hasan was born on 10 July 1979 in Swindon, Wiltshire, in South West England to Shia Muslim parents from Hyderabad in Telangana, Southern India. His mother is a doctor and his father, an engineer. Hasan grew up in Harrow, an area of outer North West London.

Hasan was privately educated at Merchant Taylors' School, an independent day school for boys at Sandy Lodge, in the Three Rivers District of Hertfordshire, near Northwood in North West London. Hasan and British actor and rapper Riz Ahmed were classmates. Hasan subsequently went up to Christ Church, University of Oxford, graduating in 2000 with a Bachelor of Arts (BA) degree in philosophy, politics and economics (PPE).

== Career ==
=== 2009–2011: Early beginnings ===
Hasan worked as a researcher and then producer on ITV's Jonathan Dimbleby programme, with a brief period in between on BBC One's The Politics Show. Following this, he became deputy executive producer on Sky's breakfast show Sunrise, before moving to Channel 4 as their editor of news and current affairs. He was appointed senior editor for politics at the New Statesman in late spring of 2009, where he stayed until May 2012, then becoming political director of The Huffington Post website.

=== 2012–2020: Al Jazeera and The Intercept ===
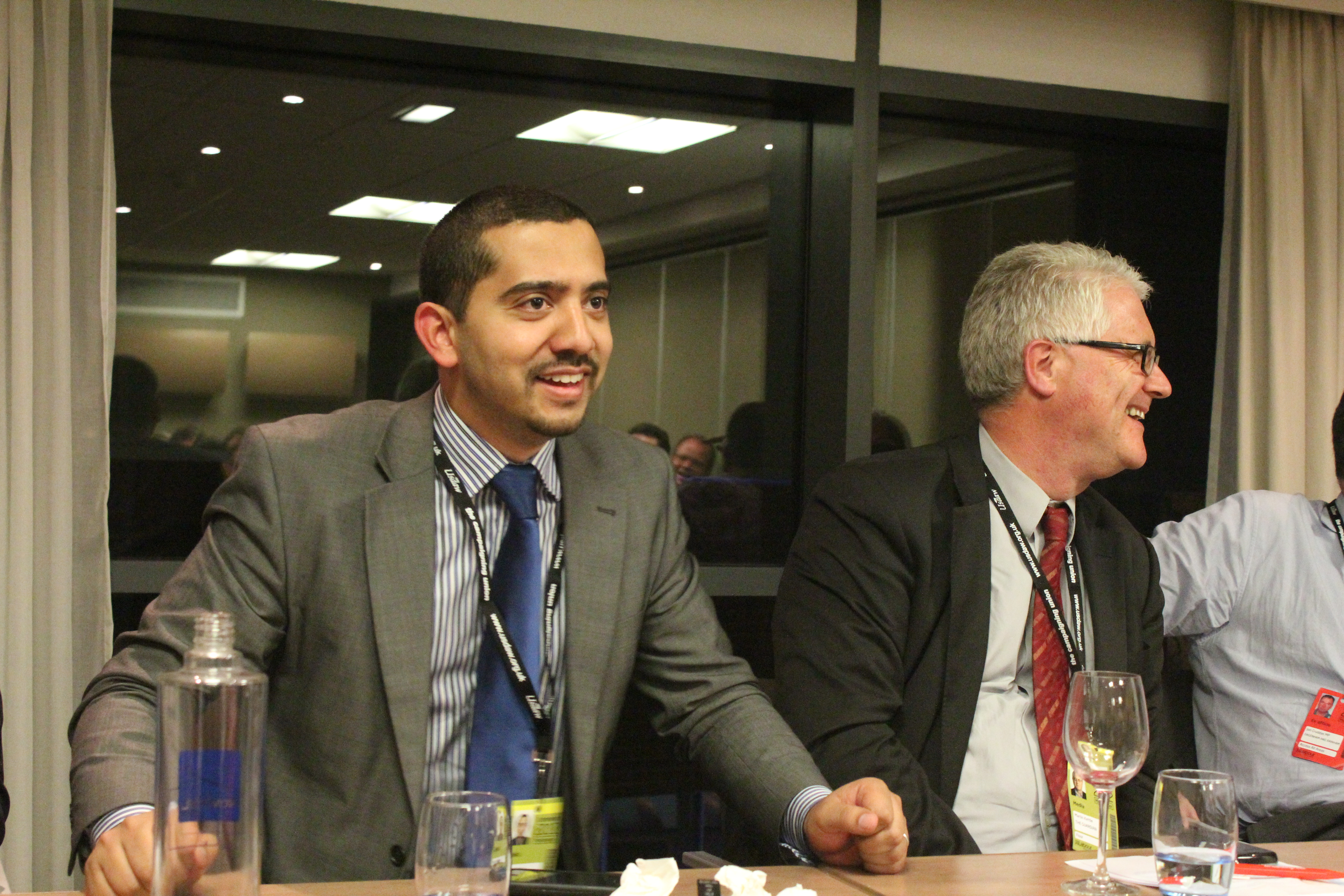
Hasan and Martin Kettle at a Labour Party conference in 2012

Hasan became a presenter on Al Jazeera's English news channel in May 2012. Hasan has appeared (six times) on the BBC's Question Time programme, and the Sunday morning programmes The Big Questions and Sunday Morning Live. On Question Time in October 2013, Hasan called the Daily Mail "immigrant-bashing, woman-hating, Muslim-smearing, NHS-undermining, [and] gay-baiting". The newspaper responded by printing an e-mail he had sent them in 2010, in which he asked for a column and praised several of their viewpoints. Hasan said the "sycophantic" letter was his writing but criticised the newspaper's decision to publish it.

In 2013, Hasan took part in a debate at the Oxford Union to consider whether Islam is a peaceful religion. Hasan, who is a Twelver Shia Muslim, vouched for Islam as a religion of peace, citing political and cultural reasons for violence in Muslim majority countries, as opposed to holding the religion of Islam responsible. In the vote on the motion, the house affirmed with Hasan and the other proposers that Islam is a religion of peace with 286 votes in favor and 168 votes against. In March 2015, Hasan appeared in a Guardian opinion video on UK immigration. Recorded at the Oxford Union, Head to Head was a programme on Al Jazeera English in which Hasan interviewed public figures; it had run for three series by December 2014. Since 2015, working full-time for the network in Washington, D.C., Hasan has hosted a weekly interview and discussion programme.

Hasan began a podcast in 2018 entitled Deconstructed, produced by the investigative journalism website The Intercept. On air, Hasan would discuss recent news topics and host guests. Notable topics covered on the podcast include police brutality, inequality, QAnon, and Donald Trump's activity on Twitter. Notable podcast guests have included Noam Chomsky, Ilhan Omar, and Bernie Sanders. On 2 October 2020, Hasan announced that he would no longer host the show as part of his move to host The Mehdi Hasan Show on NBC's new streaming service, Peacock.

=== 2021–2024: The Mehdi Hasan Show and move from MSNBC to The Guardian ===
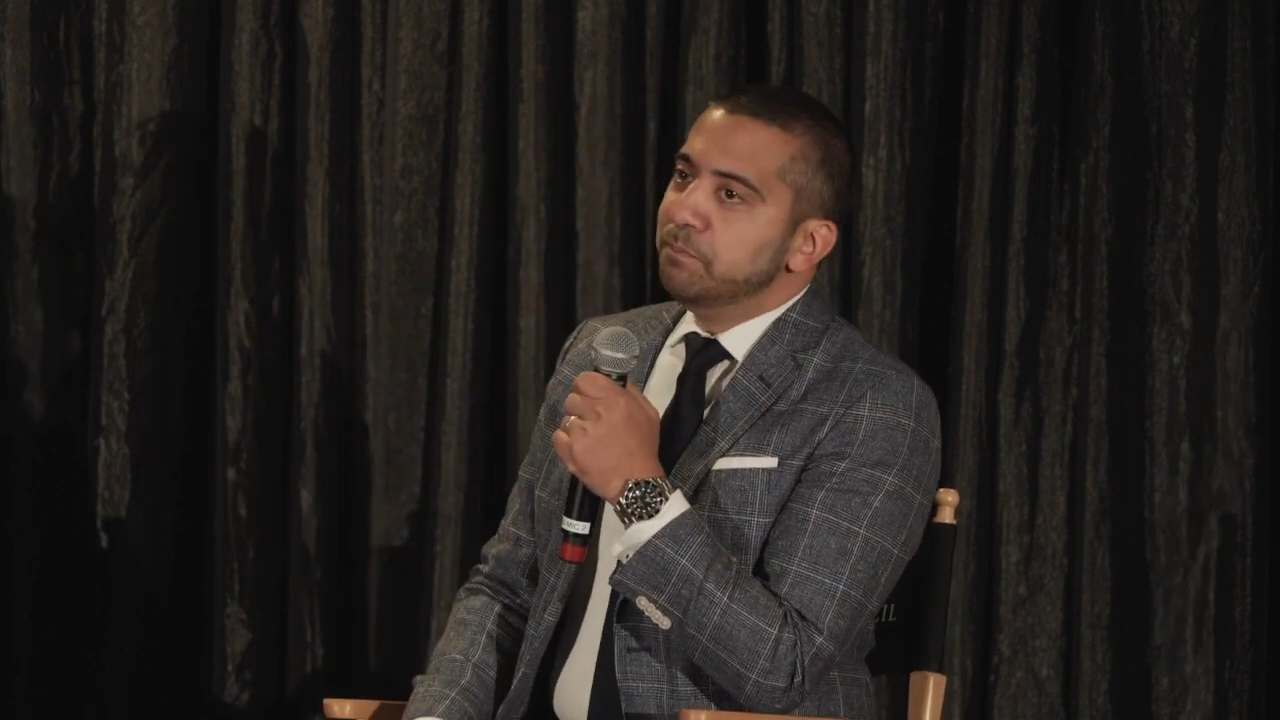
Hasan speaking at the 2023 MPAC Convention

Hasan hosted The Mehdi Hasan Show on the online service Peacock since October 2020 airing weeknights at 7 pm Eastern. Notable guests on The Mehdi Hasan Show have included Mark Ruffalo, Jon Stewart, John Bolton, Keith Ellison, Ro Khanna, John Legend, and Alexandria Ocasio-Cortez. In March 2021, Hasan launched the same show on MSNBC every Sunday evening. He was also the fill-in host on MSNBC's All In with Chris Hayes, The Rachel Maddow Show, The 11th Hour with Stephanie Ruhle, and The Last Word with Lawrence O'Donnell.

During the Gaza war, MSNBC cancelled Hasan's show. NBC stated the change was coincidental and not due to the host's religion. Eric Bazail-Eimil of Politico said the decision was made by the network "in favor of more straight news coverage of the conflict". On 30 November 2023, it was announced that Hasan's MSNBC and Peacock shows would end. Hasan announced at the end of his final show on 7 January 2024 that he had decided to leave the network. Hasan joined The Guardian as a regular columnist in February.

=== 2024–present: Launching of the digital media company Zeteo and the return of Head to Head ===
Forbes interviewed Hasan in February 2024 when the website Zeteo was created on the Substack platform. Hasan stated that Zeteo is "an ancient Greek word that means to seek out, to inquire, to get to the truth". Zeteo was presented as a subscription-based news organization. He announced that the platform will "bring you hard-hitting interviews and unsparing analysis that you won't find elsewhere". Hasan presents a new video series on the Zeteo News channel; the first one was called "Debunked! Top seven lies about Gaza".

Contributors announced upon Zeteo's launch in April 2024 included Naomi Klein, Greta Thunberg, Viet Thanh Nguyen, John Harwood, Fatima Bhutto, and Owen Jones, who would co-host the podcast Two Outspoken alongside Hasan. On 19 April 2024, it was announced that Bassem Youssef will join Zeteo as co-host for their new podcast We're Not Kidding. In June 2024, Al-Jazeera announced the return of Hasan as host of Head to Head. The programme returned with two interviews, one with Israeli historian, Benny Morris, and another with the former translator for Deng Xiaoping, Victor Gao, recorded in London in July 2024.

In late October 2024, Hasan appeared as a guest panelist on the CNN show NewsNight with Abby Phillip. During the discussion, CNN contributor Ryan Girdusky told Hasan, "I hope your beeper doesn’t go off", referring to the 2024 Lebanon electronic device attacks. Hasan responded by asking Girdusky, "Did you just say I should be killed live on CNN?" After a break, Girdusky was removed from the panel and host Abby Phillip apologized to Hasan. CNN released a statement saying "There is zero room for racism or bigotry at CNN" and that Girdusky would not be invited back to the network. Zeteo released the documentary Gaza: Doctors Under Attack in July 2025 after the BBC decided not to air the film.

== Views and political beliefs ==
=== Islamic faith ===
During a sermon delivered in 2009, Hasan made remarks about "the kuffar, the disbelievers, the atheists who remain deaf and stubborn to the teachings of Islam, the rational message of the Quran". Quoting a verse of the Quran, Hasan used the term "cattle" to describe non-believers and called them "incapable of the intellectual effort it requires to shake off those blind prejudices." He also included homosexuality in a list of categories which he argued were transgressive of Islam. Quotes from these sermons were first publicized by Peter Hitchens in 2012; in his immediate response, Hasan argued these statements had been "selectively edited".

In 2019, Hasan apologized for his comments, which he declared to "deeply regret" now, and called them "dumb offensive ranty stuff". Hasan has argued that American religiosity does not inherently create cultural conservatism or economic individualism, saying:

I am a believing and practising Muslim – but I am also a social democrat. I do not instinctively recoil...from faith groups – and, let us not forget, the hard-working, decent, law-abiding religious citizens who constitute those groups – that want to help in ameliorating poverty or inequality at home and abroad. Islam, for example, like so many other faiths, stresses the importance of mutual solidarity with our fellow man.

=== Gaza war ===
In February 2024, Hasan argued in The Guardian that U.S. president Joe Biden could have ended the Israeli bombing of the Gaza Strip by applying pressure on Israel. During an interview on Democracy Now! in late March 2024, Hasan expressed his concern about genocide in Gaza with regard to the Israeli invasion of the Gaza Strip, and that Palestinian perspectives are not shared in U.S. media. Middle East Eye reported that Hasan "challenges Piers Morgan's treatment of pro-Palestinian guests".

=== Abortion ===
Hasan used to be against abortion, a position he has since rejected. In an October 2012 online column for the New Statesman, he defended his anti-abortion views in print, writing:

"What I would like is for my fellow lefties and liberals to try to understand and respect the views of those of us who are pro-life, rather than demonise us as right-wing reactionaries or medieval misogynists."

Hasan argued that the issue of abortion is,

"one of those rare political issues on which left and right seem to have swapped ideologies: right-wingers talk of equality, human rights and 'defending the innocent', while left-wingers fetishise 'choice', selfishness and unbridled individualism."

He later expressed regret for his comments. The article gained much attention on Twitter, and Hasan debated the issue with Suzanne Moore on BBC Radio 4's Today. In a series of tweets in 2020, Hasan expressed regret for "having expressed offensive & illiberal views in the past on everything from homosexuality to abortion" and stated that they were views he no longer holds.

=== Pakistan ===
Hasan has been critical of the human rights situation in Pakistan, expressing disapproval of the country's blasphemy law, as well as enforced disappearances in Balochistan. He has also criticised the human rights situation in both Indian and Pakistan-administered Kashmir, and has called out alleged backing from Pakistan for Islamic terrorist groups like Jaish-e-Mohammed and Lashkar-e-Taiba to carry out attacks in Indian Kashmir.

=== Saudi Arabia ===
Hasan has made several statements in opposition to the Saudi government, including challenging a statement made by Donald Trump, in which Trump claimed to have no financial interests in Saudi Arabia and called allegations to the contrary "fake news". Hasan challenged Trump's statements in a video essay published by The Intercept in October 2018.

In February 2019, during a debate organised by Intelligence Squared in London, Hasan stated that the West should cut ties with Saudi Arabia, saying: "It's time we make clear that the West needs to cut its ties with Saudi Arabia, especially military ties, arms exports, weapons, bombs." The comments were made in response to the assassination of Jamal Khashoggi, allegedly ordered by the Crown Prince of Saudi Arabia, Mohammad bin Salman, as well as several human rights violations which Hasan cited as also being carried out by Saudi Arabia. Hasan had previously interviewed Khashoggi about freedom of speech in Saudi Arabia.

=== India ===
Hasan has repeatedly criticized rising religious nationalism, democratic backsliding, and suppression of dissent in India. During a February 2021 segment on The Mehdi Hasan Show, he described the Indian government's response to the farmer protests as indicative of “accelerated” authoritarianism, drawing explicit comparisons between the Indian government and former U.S. President Donald Trump.

In an interview in March 2023, he characterized the political climate under Prime Minister Narendra Modi as "increasingly authoritarian". He highlighted threats to minority communities, including Muslims, and cited India's plunge in the Reporters Without Borders press freedom index—from around 80th place two decades ago to near 180th—as a "depressing signal" for democracy. In 2015, following his interview with BJP leader Ram Madhav, Hasan described the backlash he received from Hindutva supporters, which he argued exemplified a growing intolerance toward critical journalism and dissenting voices in India.

In a 2015 AlJazeera's UpFront interview, he pressed Indian politician Shashi Tharoor on human rights violations in Jammu and Kashmir. Tharoor argues that the core issue in India-Pakistan relations "the nature of Pakistani state" rather than Kashmir itself, and said Indians had "been the first to acknowledge" the wrongs committed in the region and take action as a democracy. Hasan challenged that claim of accountability by citing an Amnesty International report that "not a single member of the security forces deployed in Jammu and Kashmir over the past 25 years has been tried for alleged human rights violations in a civilian court." Tharoor informed Hasan that there has been action including court martials, jailings, including civilian trials of police officers.

== Personal life ==
Hasan is married. He and his wife have two daughters. He became a naturalized citizen of the United States on October 9, 2020.

== Awards and recognition ==
In January 2014, Hasan was awarded the Services to Media award at the British Muslim Awards. In 2017, he was named European Young Leader by the Brussels-based think tank Friends of Europe. In 2019, Hasan won the Society of Professional Journalists' Sigma Delta Chi Award for Online Column Writing. Starting in spring of 2026, Hasan will be a visiting fellow at Georgetown University.

== Selected works ==
- With James Macintyre. Ed: The Milibands and the making of a Labour leader, London, Biteback Publishing, 2011. ISBN 978-1-84954-102-2
- Summer of Unrest: The Debt Delusion: Exposing ten Tory myths about debts, deficits and spending cuts, Vintage Digital, 28 July 2011.
- Win Every Argument: The Art of Debating, Persuading, and Public Speaking. Henry Holt and Co. 2023. ISBN 9781250853479
