= Inside Story (TV programme) =

TV series broadcast by Al Jazeera English

- Title card
- Presented by: Various
- Country of origin: Qatar

Production
- Production location: Doha
- Running time: 30 minutes

Original release
- Network: Al Jazeera English
- Release: November 2006 – present

Inside Story is a daily news programme broadcast by Al Jazeera English. The programme provides analysis and commentary on recent news stories and is modeled after Mā Warā’ al-Khabar (Arabic: ما وراء الخبر; Behind the News) on the sister channel, Al Jazeera Arabic.

== Original version ==
The original Al Jazeera English version of the programme broadcasts from Al Jazeera's studios in Doha, with an anchor who is joined by guests from around the globe. The hosts rotate depending upon the topic being covered.

The programme began airing in November 2006 alongside the launch of Al Jazeera English.

== American version ==
An American version of the show launched on Al Jazeera America on August 20, 2013 on the channel's debut and was first hosted by Libby Casey who afterwards acted as a fill in host. The show for most of its time was hosted full-time by Ray Suarez formerly of PBS Newshour.

The show was based in Washington D.C. and is filmed at Al Jazeera's DC hub studios on a set which it shared with the Al Jazeera English programme UpFront. It was originally shot on the former set of Inside Story Americas. The show's format was identical to that of the original Al Jazeera English programme with the exception that it has a full time host.

== Spin-offs ==
In December 2011, Al Jazeera English launched three spinoffs. Two related to the United States:

- Inside Story Americas, which focuses solely on stories related to the Americas and was the forerunner to the American version of the show on Al Jazeera America.
- Inside Story: US 2012, which covered the U.S. 2012 presidential election.

Inside Story Americas - and, formerly, Inside Story: US 2012 - has a rotation of Washington D.C anchors.

The third programme:

- Inside Syria, was launched to cover the Civil War in Syria.

It uses the same set as another former programme: Inside Iraq, hosted by Jasim Al-Azzawi.
