= Zeteo =

American media company

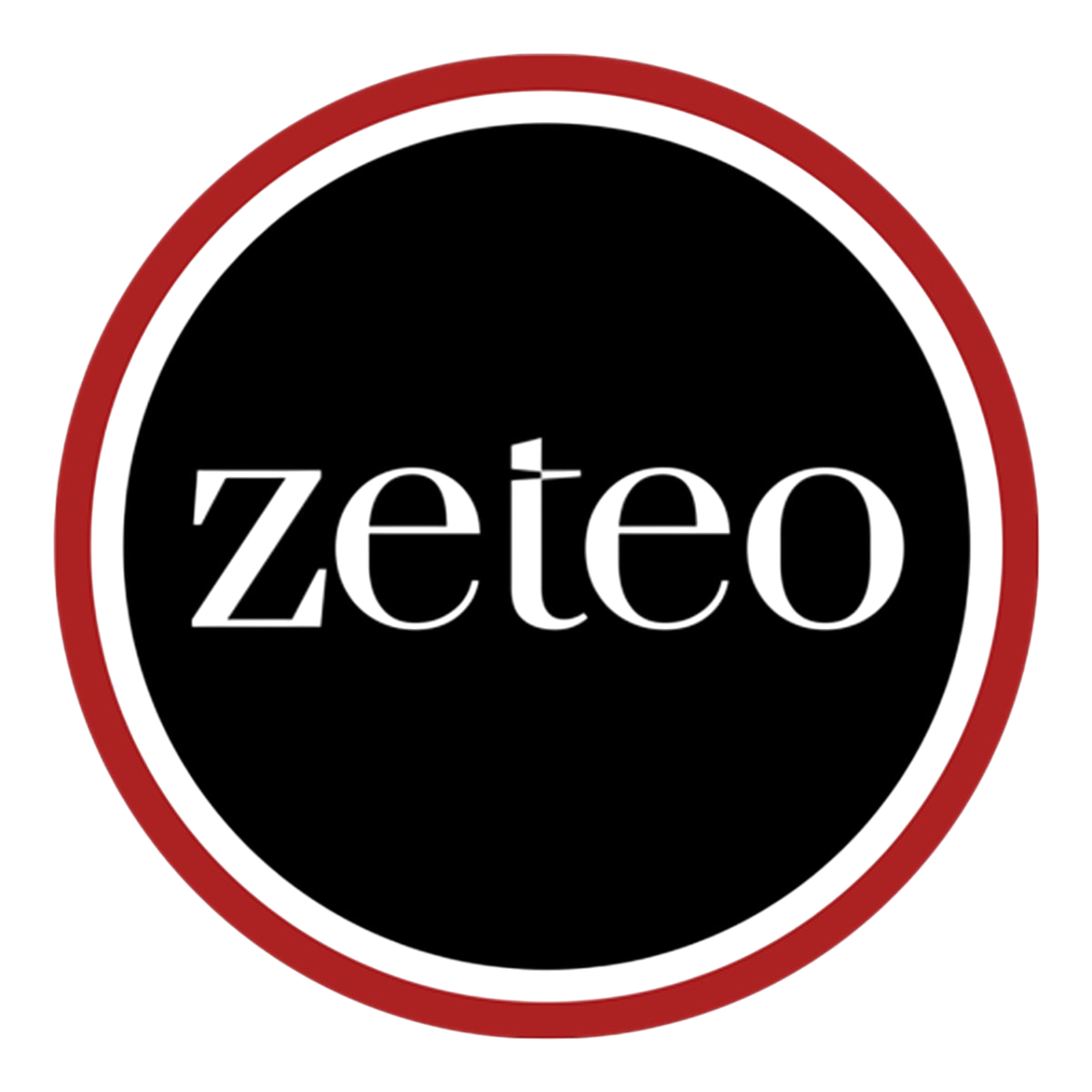
- Company type: Media company
- Website type: News website
- Founded: April 15, 2024
- Headquarters: Washington, D.C.
- Country of origin: United States
- Area served: Worldwide
- Founder: Mehdi Hasan
- Industry: News
- Revenue: $3.9 million (2025)
- Employees: 9 editors, 14 contributors
- Website: zeteo.com
- Users: 700,000+ subscribers
- Current status: Active

Zeteo (/zəˈteɪoʊ/ zə-TAY-oh; from Ancient Greek ζητέω (zētéō) 'to seek, to inquire') is a progressive media company and Substack newsletter founded by British-American journalist Mehdi Hasan on April 15, 2024, after he quit MSNBC because of his talk show's cancellation. Hasan said it cost $4 million to launch the outlet and that it reports from a left-wing perspective, covering news not reported by mainstream media outlets. Zeteo has been called an alternative media outlet that espouses progressive values.

Zeteo publishes daily news and holds a weekly talk show, Mehdi Unfiltered, hosted by Hasan, and a weekly podcast. The outlet has a YouTube channel with over 2 million subscribers and uploads four to five videos per week. Journalist Oliver Darcy wrote in August 2025 that Zeteo's newsletter has more than 700,000 subscribers and over 50,000 paid subscribers, who pay $12 per month. Zeteo has an estimated annual revenue of $3.9 million as of 2025. In June 2026 Hasan announced that Zeteo would expand into the United Kingdom.

== History ==
=== Pre-launch ===
The Mehdi Hasan Show, hosted by left-wing journalist and political commentator Mehdi Hasan on MSNBC, was canceled for unclear reasons in 2023. The incident caused Hasan to leave the network, and his audience began to express increased support for him. People who held progressive views were upset by the show's cancellation. On February 28, 2024, Hasan announced the creation of a new media company, Zeteo. Its name came from a Greek word meaning "to seek". Hasan scheduled Zeteo's full launch in April 2024 on Substack. He said Zeteo would feature daily news stories by various well-known writers, as well as a weekly talk show, Mehdi Unfiltered, and a weekly podcast. He said that to read the site's full content, users would need to subscribe for $6 per month.

Hasan said he raised $4 million to fund the creation of the company from his friends, family members, and fans disillusioned by the end of his talk show. He said Zeteo would cover news ignored by the mainstream media and that, unlike the Tucker Carlson Network, it would not center around him but would exist "with multiple voices". In March 2024, Press Gazette wrote that the Zeteo newsletter would produce interviews, news, and op-eds from a left-leaning perspective and that Zeteo's Substack already had 94,000 subscribers in April and four editors, excluding Hasan. The publication was said to hire both US-based and international writers. The weekly show would be filmed at Zeteo's headquarters in Washington, D.C. Hasan said the podcast would feature figures from Hollywood the audience would find "surprising". He added that Zeteo would cover not only news but also culture and entertainment.

=== Company ===
In April 2024, Zeteo announced the start of its operations. The company said it had hired contributors, including activist Greta Thunberg, comedian W. Kamau Bell, writer Naomi Klein, journalist Spencer Ackerman, and former CNN correspondent John Harwood. Substack officials held an event at the International Spy Museum for Hasan shortly after Zeteo's founding that was attended by hundreds of people, including journalist Kara Swisher and politician Alexandria Ocasio-Cortez, with whom Hasan talked about Palestine and Zeteo itself.

By September 2024, Zeteo was considered one of the most popular outlets on Substack, employing nine editors and 14 contributors. Hasan described its audience as a mix of progressives and Democrats who previously watched his talk show. In a November 2024 interview with Sreenivasan Jain, he discussed why he founded the company. He said Zeteo rose in popularity because people were "fed up" with "corporate media" and wanted independent journalism.

On April 15, 2025, Zeteo's first anniversary, Hasan gave an interview to the Los Angeles Times about the state of the company. He said Zeteo was created during Ramadan with the help of four people. He said its popularity surpassed his team's expectations and that it was "in a very good place". In September 2025, Zeteo launched a morning newsletter co-written by Hasan and hired a number of Rolling Stone editors. Hasan said Zeteo had reached almost 500,000 non-paying subscribers and 50,000 paid subscribers on Substack. In November 2025, it was reported that Zeteo had an estimated annual revenue of $3.9 million.

In June 2026, Hasan announced the launch of a new stand-alone Zeteo offshoot focused on the United Kingdom called Zeteo UK. His stated reason was that the UK's media was "broken", citing claims of bias and declining trust in traditional media. Sangita Myska, Owen Jones, Grace Blakeley, Afua Hirsch, and Peter Oborne are set to join the new site. Zeteo UK is planned to fully launch in September and to release content sporadically until then. Hasan gave an interview to Sky News about the launch.

== Content ==
=== Notable interviews ===
In May 2024, Pakistani politician Hina Butt accused Pakistani prime minister Imran Khan on X (formerly Twitter) of paying Zeteo for an exclusive interview with him that month. Her tweet was immediately hit with a community note by contributors, who said she had misunderstood the context of the word "paid" in Zeteo's article about the interview. The word actually meant that the article was available to paid subscribers.

In June 2024, Zeteo interviewed three former United States Department of Defense employees about the Gaza war. Haaretz reported that month that many Zeteo interviews went viral online and that Hasan was known to "rigorously" fact-check participants of Mehdi Unfiltered.

Zeteo has interviewed figures such as Malaysian prime minister Anwar Ibrahim and Bangladeshi chief adviser Muhammad Yunus. Zeteo has also interviewed New York City Mayor Zohran Mamdani twice—in September 2025, when Mamdani criticized the Anti-Defamation League, and in December 2024, when Mamdani said he would arrest Benjamin Netanyahu if Mamdani were mayor and Netanyahu visited.

=== Documentaries ===
In July 2024, Zeteo published its first documentary film, Israel's Reel Extremism. It shows various posts by Israel Defense Forces soldiers on social media and interviews with the soldiers who posted them. The film was produced by Basement Films and its premiere was co-hosted by Jewish Currents. In May 2025, Zeteo released another documentary, Who Killed Shireen?, which analyzes the death of Palestinian-American journalist Shireen Abu Akleh in the West Bank and concludes that she was killed by the IDF's Duvdevan Unit. The film is 40 minutes long and was also co-premiered by Jewish Currents.

On July 3, 2025, Zeteo published the documentary Gaza: Doctors Under Attack. It was commissioned but not aired by BBC News. The film was produced by Basement Films and directed by three people, including former Channel 4 News employee. The film shows the difficulties that Palestinian medical personnel face in the Gaza Strip. It features interviews with health workers in Gaza and was released only because it was acquired by Zeteo. In October 2026, Zeteo released Night Flower: Inside AIPAC's Fight for Influence, a documentary examining the pro-Israel lobby group AIPAC's influence on U.S. politics.

== Political standpoint and reporting ==
Zeteo has been described as a progressive, alternative media, and left-leaning outlet. Hasan has called it a "movement for media accountability", from a left-wing perspective. Corbin Bolies of TheWrap noted that most of Zeteo's content focuses on the Gaza war and the second Trump administration. Haaretz said that Zeteo had "extensively" covered the Gaza war since it began.

Zeteo's political views have led some to suspect that the organization may be funded by the Government of Qatar. Al Jazeera staff member Hasan denied the accusations, calling them "lazy anti-Muslim racism". In September 2024, New York Post reporter John Levin asked Hasan whether Zeteo had received any funding from Qatar, to which he replied that Zeteo had not received any money from foreign entities and is funded by US citizens.

In June 2026, Samuel Rubinstein of UnHerd said that Zeteo UK could act as a "media arm of the Green Party" given Hasan's ideological similarities to it. He also said it would position itself as a voice of "Gen Z socialism". James Warrington of The Daily Telegraph called Zeteo an "unapologetically progressive" and pro-Palestinian news outlet that focuses on covering Israel. He said that Zeteo's "staunchly anti-Israel" stance will attract British left-wing audiences interested in the Arab–Israeli conflict to its UK offshoot.

== Reception ==
In April 2024, Substack co-founder Hamish McKenzie said Zeteo was doing "freakishly well", adding: "The success it's had so far is unlike anything we've seen to date". In May 2024, Harry Lambert of the New Statesman called Zeteo "one of the most successful new media companies in the US" that are "chasing the success" of Bari Weiss's The Free Press. Lambert asked Hasan whether he was inspired by Weiss; he said she is "good at building a media company" and that he is "going to learn from her that it is possible".

In September 2024, Jeremy Barr of The Washington Post wrote of Zeteo's launch, "so far, so good", noting that it had grown significantly.
