= The Old Neighborhood =

The Old Neighborhood could refer to:

- The Old Neighborhood (book), a 1999 non-fiction book by Ray Suarez
- The Old Neighborhood (play), a 1997 play by David Mamet

== See also ==
- Old Neighborhoods Historic District, a national historic district located at Lexington, Lafayette County, Missouri
