= Algeciras (disambiguation) =

Algeciras is a port city in the south of Spain.

Algeciras may also refer to:

== In Spain ==
- The Bay of Algeciras, or Bay of Gibraltar, the area of sea to the north-west of the Gibraltar Strait
- The Port of Algeciras
- The Taifa of Algeciras, a medieval Muslim taifa kingdom in what is now southern Spain
- Algeciras CF, a Spanish football team
- Algeciras BM, a Spanish handball team

== Other places ==
- Algeciras, Huila, Colombia
- Algeciras, a barangay in Agutaya municipality in Palawan, Philippines

== Other uses ==
- Algeciras Conference, an international forum to decide the future of Morocco
- Operation Algeciras, a military operation of the Falklands War
- Battle of Algeciras Bay, in fact two battles that took place at the beginning of the nineteenth century
- Algeciras-class container ship, a class of container ships consisting of 12 vessels in total

== See also ==
- Al Jazira
