= Marwan Bishara =

Arab Palestinian journalist

- مروان بشارة
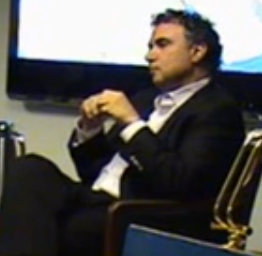
- Bishara in 2012
- Born: 1969 (age 56–57); Nazareth, Israel
- Education: School for Advanced Studies in the Social Sciences
- Occupation: Journalist
- Employer: Al Jazeera English (2007–)

Marwan Bishara (Arabic: مروان بشارة) is an Israeli-Arab author, columnist and senior political analyst for Al Jazeera English. From 2009 to 2016, Bishara was the editor and host of their flagship programs Empire, which examined global powers and their agendas in a fusion of documentary and debate with politicians, generals, philosophers, academics, novelists, movie directors, and activists from the world over. He has been described as "one of the Arab world's leading public intellectuals" and writes extensively on global politics and is widely considered a leading authority on the Middle East and international affairs.

Although he was born in Israel, Bishara has spent most of his adult life outside the country, including periods of studying, living and working in the United States and France as well as traveling extensively in the course of his career interests, travel which he has described as providing "perspectives like no other".

== Life and career ==
Marwan Bishara was born in Nazareth, Israel, into a Christian Arab family. His mother was a school teacher and his father a health inspector and trade unionist; his siblings include Israeli former politician Azmi and Rawia Bishara (a chef, cookbook writer and restaurateur).

Bishara earned a PhD in political sociology and strategic studies in 2005 from the École des hautes études en sciences sociales (EHESS) in 2005. His thesis, undertaken under the supervision of sociologist Alain Joxe, is entitled "Israeli dependency relations with the United States after 1967: transnational relationship of patronage and the globalization of the Israeli-Palestinian deadlock". During this period, Bishara was a lecturer in International Relations at the American University of Paris and worked as a senior researcher at the Interdisciplinary Research Centre for peace and Strategic Studies (French) Centre interdisciplinaire de recherche sur la paix et d'études stratégiques (CIRPES) He also taught at Parsons School of Design in Paris prior to that. Before joining Al Jazeera in 2007, he was senior political analyst for Abu Dhabi TV. In 2017–18 he joined St Anthony's College, Oxford University, as an academic visitor, working on US Patron-Client relations in the Middle East.

Bishara's journalistic output spans more than 30 years, appearing in The New York Times, Washington Post, Newsweek, The Guardian, Le Monde, Le Monde Diplomatique The Nation, Huffington Post, among other outlets, together with a collection of opinion pieces for Al Jazeera. He has written in English, Arabic, Hebrew and French and has had his work translated into other languages. YouTube carries a large number of his analyses for Al Jazeera on contemporary affairs in more than one language.

Considered an authority on strategic affairs, notably US foreign policy, Cold War, and Middle Eastern relations, Bishara has been a consistent vocal critic of official policies, especially American and Soviet imperialism, European colonialism, and Middle East dictatorships.

Bishara identifies as a liberal democrat in as far as he supports liberal democracy. He is also a pacifist and has written extensively on the futility and savagery of war, its disingenuous justifications and inherent misogyny preferring to press for diplomacy and conflict resolution.

As a Palestinian intellectual, Bishara has been a critic of Israeli policies and violence while denouncing anti-semitism and all other forms of racism. While he has criticised some of Hamas' methods as "unsavoury", he rejects comparisons of Hamas with Al-Qaeda or ISIS. He points out that unlike those groups, Hamas has never carried out an attack outside of historical Palestine and it legitimately won a majority in the most recent Palestinian legislative election.

Bishara has advocated for Palestinian unity, with a focus on creating productive employment for Palestinians - partly so they are not forced to work in Israeli settlements. He has been supportive of his brother Azmi's political career, saying "Azmi represents a popular vision of the people of Israel and Palestine coexisting in security and harmony."

Dr. Bishara has served on a number of boards, including the Jerusalem Fund, previously the Center for Policy Analysis on Palestine in Washington, D.C., and was a commissioner/advisor to the World Council of Churches. Currently, he serves on the Board of Trustees of The Galilee Foundation, a UK-based charity established in 2007 to promote development and equality of the Palestinian indigenous community in Israel.

== Quotes ==
On CNN, regarding the Arab League's attempted regulation of media outlets such as Al Jazeera: "I think Arab – certain Arab – governments are really worried from the freedom of expression that is going on in the Arab world."

On human rights

"Universal values and the respect of human rights in general are our best bet to preserve civilization in the long run. Ethics translate into securing the long term interests of humanity on this earth."

On war

"In reality, not even the most skilled spokesman can outsmart a dying child, a weeping father or grieving sister."

"This definite and paradoxical conclusion – the most instructive, and yet ignored of all lessons of war is categorical: Not one great power possessing superior firepower has won against a weaker, less organised and less professional resistance against occupation."

"Call it provocation or whatever you may, but legitimate resistance to military occupation is a right enshrined not only in every law of the land, but also in the law of nature."

"If only people spend as much time averting and avoiding war as they spent waging wars and dealing with their devastating consequences, the world may be a better place."

On oligarchs

"What is it that you want to do with billions that you can't do with millions?" Because you see when we talk about billions we are talking about power, about the oligarchy & the destruction of democracy..." "In a civilisation it’s the society that defines wealth, not the few wealthy that define society and democracy because that’s what matters."

On happiness/wellbeing

"Wellbeing may be achieved through "life, liberty and pursuit of happiness", but only in tandem with, not at the expense of another individual, nation, race or gender or generation's "life, liberty and pursuit of happiness"

On arrogance

"Arrogance all too often breeds stupidity."

"Arrogance breeds contempt; religious arrogance breeds conflict".

"America's ultimate power resides in deterrence, not the actual use of force. Power, especially when shared, is a source of stability, whereas force generates instability and humiliation. Only arrogance can explain the use of force with disregard to international law. Arrogance breeds enemies and leads to mistakes."

On the war in Iraq, including some prophetic statements

"A sweeping fatalism is gripping the Middle East as the spectre of war defies UN diplomacy. Washington's conservatives reckon if force doesn't work, more force will, and if things don't worsen they won't improve."

"Pursuing this apocalyptic path can only lead to regional chaos and eventually bring down the curtains on an American era. The proponents of another Gulf War reckon it's time for a regional "shake up" among friends and foe alike. They are betting on the easy part—a quick victory in the war—but ignore the impossible task of winning the peace."

"To ameliorate its image, Washington needs policy reform, not improvements in media coverage. Unfavorable opinion of the United States in the Arab world does not exist because people are blind to its values, but rather because they see through the Bush administration's arrogant policy towards them."

On the war against terrorism

"The last time I checked, there was no legal or strategic interpretation of evil. An open-ended war on evil leads to Armageddon."

"For most outsiders, the US is in denial over its own “evil doing” around the world. Obama and McCain could see evil in Darfur but would not admit that the invasion and occupation of Iraq on false premises or for oil is no less an evil act."

On the US/Israel relationship

"Insane! And, well, insanely stupid.

New Year message

"Above all else, life is a personal struggle and a shared journey. Life is meaningless without a meaningful struggle, especially one waged with empathy and passion in the pursuit of, well, happiness. Now that is a future worth fighting for; a good fight worth fighting".

On populism

Anyone who blames Mexicans, Blacks and Muslims for the misfortunes of your country is deceiving you. They don’t deserve you, and they sure as hell don’t deserve your support.

Anyone who tells you that only the rich can pull you out of misery after the banks ran your financial system into the ground is lying to you.

On Israel

"Since [October 7], Israel turned vengeful, tribal and adamant on destruction and expansion with total disregard for basic human decency and international law...But this foreign tribe has no chance of surviving among all the indigenous people of the region, who have coalesced more than ever before against the bloody intruder."

On the October 7 Attacks

"Some of the images from [the attacks] are no doubt gruesome – but the images from Iraq, Afghanistan, Syria, Yemen, Libya, etc have been no less horrific. Two decades of Western and Israeli wars in the Middle East have led to not thousands, but millions of Arab and Palestinian casualties."

== Publications ==
=== Books ===
- Croisade anti-terroriste Broché. Paris: La Decouverte. 2003 ISBN 978-2707138835
- Palestine/Israel: Peace or Apartheid. London/New York: Zed Books. 2003 [2001]. ISBN 978-1-84277-273-7.
- Embedded. New York: Nation Books, 2004, ISBN 978-1560255246
- The Invisible Arab. Nation Books/Perseus. 2012. ISBN 978-1-56858-708-0.

=== Articles ===
- "The Middle East's oldest dictatorship. Israel's rule over the Palestinians beyond the peace rhetoric". Al Jazeera. 21 April 2011.
- "Egypt's Community Organizers Teach the World a Lesson". Huffington Post. 12 February 2011.
