= Richelle Carey =

American journalist

- Born: October 13, 1971 (age 54); Houston, Texas, U.S.
- Education: Baylor University (BA)
- Occupations: Broadcast journalist, news anchor
- Notable credit(s): UpFront; Al Jazeera America News; Prime News
- Children: 1 (adopted)

Richelle Carey (born October 13, 1971) is an American broadcast journalist. She was an anchor on Al Jazeera English and was previously an anchor for Al Jazeera America.

Carey was previously a news anchor for HLN and correspondent for its Prime News broadcast, from May 2006 to June 2013; she joined HLN from KMOV-TV St. Louis, Missouri. Prior to joining KMOV in the summer of 2003, Carey was the morning and afternoon news anchor at the Fox affiliate in Henderson-Las Vegas, Nevada (KVVU).

== Early life and education ==
Richelle Carey was born in Houston, Texas, on October 13, 1971. Carey's mother is a nurse who works with teenagers in poverty-stricken neighborhoods. She first attended Smith College but later graduated from Baylor University in her native Texas, where she earned a bachelor's degree in telecommunications.

== Career ==
Carey started her television career as an intern at KPRC-TV in Houston, Texas. She was later promoted and became an associate producer at the station. After leaving KPRC, Carey worked as a reporter and anchor in Texas, Nevada, and Missouri. She later moved to Atlanta to work for HLN, where she was responsible for the covering women and children affected by violence. During her time here, she interviewed a number of women who have gone through trials and tribulations. She interviewed women such as Mary J. Blige, Janet Jackson and Chaka Khan. She hosted the weekly segments on HLN, "What Matters", discussing issues facing the African-American community.

She was best known for her coverage of Fort Hood in Texas and the week she spent in Bosnia where she covered the work of soldiers in the 1st US Cavalry stationed there.

On July 11, 2013, she was announced as one of the first news anchors at Al Jazeera America. After the closure of Al Jazeera America in April 2016, she became a presenter at Al Jazeera English in Doha, Qatar and one of the few Al Jazeera America personnel retained. In October 2020, she became the temporary host of UpFront on Al Jazeera English until Marc Lamont Hill was chosen as the permanent replacement.

Carey is an advocate for teen girls and women, specifically the sexualization of young girls and women's rights.

She has served as a VP of the Board of Directors of Men Stopping Violence, and served on the Board of the Girl Scouts of Greater Atlanta.

In 2020, Carey left Al Jazeera and returned to the United States.

== Awards ==
- Emmy award-reporting consumer features at KMOV
- Emerging Journalist - Houston Association of Black Journalists
