= Janjira =

Janjira may refer to:

- Janjira State, a pre-1948 Indian princely state of the erstwhile British Raj and located in the modern day Raigad district, Maharashtra
- Murud-Janjira, a historic fort on an island off the coast of Murud village, Raigad district, Maharashtra, India
- Janjira, a fictional Japanese nuclear powered experiment city depicted in the 2014 film Godzilla, located along the coast line somewhere near Mount Fuji

== See also ==
- Jazira (disambiguation), etymon of Janjira
