= The Café (2011 talk show) =

- No. of seasons: 3
- No. of episodes: 19

Production
- Running time: 47–49 minutes

Original release
- Network: Al Jazeera English
- Release: 15 July 2011 – August 31, 2012

The Café is a talk show broadcast on Al Jazeera English which features discussions held in cafés around the world. Moderated by Al Jazeera correspondents, the discussions are held in a roundtable format between local leaders, activists and experts. The show premiered on 15 July 2011. The third season of the programme was presented by Mehdi Hasan.

== Episodes ==
=== Season 1 ===
Episode	City	Moderated by	Original air date	Discussion
1	Cairo	Ayman Mohyeldin	15 July 2011	The post-Hosni Mubarak transition in Egypt.
2	Cairo	Ayman Mohyeldin	22 July 2011	Egypt's new role after the Arab Spring.
3	Nairobi	Yvonne Ndege	29 July 2011	Ethnic divisions in Kenya. The discussion was joined by prime minister Raila Odinga.
4	Nairobi	Yvonne Ndege	5 August 2011	Corruption and efforts to promote transparency in Kenya.
5	Sarajevo	Sami Zeidan	12 August 2011	Historic ethnic and religious differences, government dysfunction and international indifference facing Bosnia-Herzegovina.
6	Sarajevo	Sami Zeidan	19 August 2011	Economic problems, corruption, government bureaucracy facing young Bosnians.
7	Mumbai	Fauziah Ibrahim	26 August 2011	The progress of women's rights in India and the challenges of living in a patriarchial society.
8	Mumbai	Fauziah Ibrahim	2 September 2011	India's economic progress, corruption and social inequality.

=== Season 2 ===
Episode	City	Moderated by	Original air date	Discussion
1	Beirut	Rula Amin	23 December 2011	The future of Syria after the 2011 uprising. The discussion was held in neighbouring Lebanon as foreign journalists were banned in Syria.
2	Tripoli	Anita McNaught	30 December 2011	The rebuilding process in post-Muammar Gaddafi Libya.
3	Tunis	Nazanine Moshiri	6 January 2012	The transition to democracy in Tunisia one year after the revolution.

=== Season 3 ===
Episode	City	Moderated by	Original air date	Discussion
1	Athens	Mehdi Hasan	13 July 2012	The Greek government-debt crisis, its effect on domestic politics and the broader impact it may have on the euro and the European Union .
2	Istanbul	Mehdi Hasan	20 July 2012	The rise of Turkey as a major regional power and the struggle between its secularist and Islamic traditions .
3	Amman	Mehdi Hasan	27 July 2012	The future of the Kingdom of Jordan in the context of the Israeli-Palestinian conflict and ongoing protests .
4	Bradford	Mehdi Hasan	3 August 2012	Multiculturalism, inter-ethnic tensions and poverty in the 21st-century United Kingdom .
5	Tel Aviv	Mehdi Hasan	10 August 2012	The increasing rift between secular Jews and growing religious communities in Israel, settlement expansion and the continuing occupation of the Palestinian territories and the sparking of the Israeli social justice protests.
6	Ramallah	Mehdi Hasan	18 August 2012	The divide in the Palestinian territories between the Fatah-ruled West Bank and the Hamas-led Gaza Strip, prospects for a permanent peace settlement, and the feasibility of the one, two and three-state solutions.
7	Washington DC	Mehdi Hasan	18 August 2012	Challenges to the United States' status as the world's leading economic, military and political power, the rise of the Tea Party and Occupy movements, and Barack Obama's prospects for the 2012 election.
8	Mexico City	Mehdi Hasan	31 August 2012	The contrast between the chaos of the Mexican drug war and Mexico's buoyant economic growth, and the chances of newly elected president Enrique Peña Nieto being able to stop the violence.
