= Empire (2006 TV series) =

- Title card
- Created by: Al Jazeera English
- Presented by: Marwan Bishara

Production
- Production location: Various
- Running time: 1 hour

Original release
- Network: Al Jazeera English (except United States); YouTube and Aljazeera.com (United States)
- Release: November 2006 – 2017

Empire is a one-hour program on Al Jazeera English which examines global powers and their agendas. The show is hosted by Marwan Bishara.

Empire on Al Jazeera English, consistently challenges concepts about global powers and global elites. Through Empire episodes such as "The US between Two Wars", "SuperClass", "BRIC: The New World Order", or "US & Iran: Best of Enemies?", Marwan Bishara has posed pertinent questions on a vast range of topics. Empire has been successful at dissecting the most significant geo-political issues of the day by fusing the best Al Jazeera field reporting with an in-depth studio debate with the participation of leading analysts and commentators.

In later episodes, the debates sometimes take place in the location in question. The show breaks down said countries' policies with the people who live in them and examines whether those policies work and who benefits.

== Availability ==
All episodes are available on YouTube and on demand on Aljazeera.com. During the time of Al Jazeera America, Empire was one of the few Al Jazeera English shows not geo-blocked in the United States by Al Jazeera Media Network.

Host Marwan Bishara was one of the loudest voices of opposition to Al Jazeera English being geo-blocked in the United States in favour of Al Jazeera America. Empire was geo-blocked along with the rest of Al Jazeera English's shows until April 2014 when the block was lifted in the United States because unlike the other AJE shows, Empire was not shown on Al Jazeera America where the other shows were.
