= List of Al Jazeera English awards =

Al Jazeera English has received several prestigious awards from organizations across the globe. The network has been honored for overall excellence in achieving its mission, in addition to praise for Al Jazeera's individual reporters and their work.

== 2006 ==
- Association of International Broadcasters: Best Magazine or Documentary Programme, Abdallah el-Binni's "Prisoner 345"

== 2007 ==
- Asian Television Awards: Best News Report, Kylie Grey: Agent Orange
- Association for International Broadcasting: Editors Award, Everywoman

== 2008 ==
- Foreign Press Association: News Story of the Year by a full member, Jonah Hull's "Russia-Georgia War"
- Association of International Broadcasters Editors Award: Sami Al Haj, suffering endured and courage shown
- Amnesty International Media Awards Best International TV Documentary: Tony Birtley's "The Lost Tribe - Secret Army of the CIA"
- YouTube European Partners Awards: Community Champion Award, Al Jazeera Network
- Monte-Carlo TV Festival: Golden Nymph Award - Best 24 Hour News Programme, on Gaza siege
- CONCENTRA Award (2008): Breaking News, Tony Birtley's "Inside Myanmar - The Crackdown"
- Royal Television Society Journalism Awards: Young Journalist of the Year, Hamish Macdonald
- Asian Television Awards: Best Current Affairs Programme, Tony Birtley's "Inside Myanmar - The Crackdown"

== 2009 ==
- International Emmy Awards nomination, Finalist in Documentary category, Shooting the Messenger
- International Emmy Awards nomination, Finalist in News and Current Affairs, Russia-Georgia War" and Witness: Return to Nablus
- Concentra (Belgium): Breaking News Award, Subina Shreshta : Up the Irrawaddy Delta
- International Digital Emmy Awards: nominee non-fiction, 2008 US election special

== 2010 ==
- Association for International Broadcasting: Clearest Coverage of a Single News Event
- Freesat Awards: Best News Channel of the Year
- Monte-Carlo Television Festival: Best Television News Item, Mexico in the Crossfire
- Amnesty International Media Awards: International Television and Radio Award, People and Power
- Concentra (Belgium): Breaking News Award, Casey Kauffman - Baby Feras

== 2011 ==
- Rory Peck Awards: Best Feature, Libya: Through the Fire
- Foreign Press Association: Documentary of the Year, Bahrain: Shouting in the Dark
- Huffington Post Ultimate Media Gamechanger Award
- Freesat Awards: Best News Channel of the Year
- Freesat Awards: Coverage of a Single News Event, for the channel's coverage of the Arab Spring
- Arab-British Centre: Culture and Society Award
- Wincott Awards: Best Television Coverage of a Business Issue, Nablus: The Business of Occupation
- Columbia University Journalism Awards
- Promax Awards Arabia, Gold, Best In-House Station Image
- Promax Awards Arabia, Gold, Best Promo Campaign
- Promax Awards Arabia, Gold, Counting the Cost
- TIME magazine: Top 100 most influential people, Ayman Mohyeldin
- Fast Company: Most creative thinker of the year, Wadah Khanfar

== 2012 ==
- Webby People's Choice Award: for News and Politics in the online film and video category, The Stream
- Royal Television Society: News Channel for the Year
- Royal Television Society: Most Innovative Programme, The Stream
- George Polk Award for Television Documentary: Bahrain: Shouting in the Dark
- The Franklin D Roosevelt Four Freedoms Awards: Freedom of Speech and Expression Medal
- Alfred I DuPont Award, Best Documentary: Haiti: Six Months On
- Foreign Press Association Awards (FPA): Best Environmental Story of the Year for Bee Fence: Earthrise episode 1 (series 2)
- CINE Golden Eagle Award: Burma Boy for History Programming, Profession Telecast Non-fiction Category
- CINE Golden Eagle Award: Bahrain: Shouting in the Dark for Investigative Programming, Profession Telecast News Division
- CINE Golden Eagle Award: The Crying Forest for Investigative Programming, Professional Telecast News Division
- CINE Golden Eagle Award: Witness: Dream on Hold for Informational Programming, Professional Telecast News Division
- Monte Carlo TV Festival: Golden Nymph for Best News Documentary Bahrain: Shouting in the Dark
- Amnesty International Media Award: Bahrain: Shouting in the Dark for International TV and Radio
- Robert F. Kennedy Journalism Award: Bahrain: Shouting in the Dark for International Television
- Robert F. Kennedy Journalism Award: Grand Prize, Bahrain: Shouting in the Dark
- One World Media Award: Tanzania: Spell of the Albino for Children's Rights
- The George Foster Peabody Award: Al Jazeera's Coverage of the Arab Awakening
- Scripps Howard Award for Television/Cable In-Depth Reporting: Bahrain: Shouting in the Dark
- International Gold Panda Award: Best Short Documentary for 101 East: Bangladesh - Too Young to Work
- New York Festival: Silver Medal for 101 East: Nepal – Children for Sale

== 2013 ==
- CINE Golden Eagle Award "What Killed Arafat" for Best Investigative Journalism
- CINE Golden Eagle Award "Syria: Songs of Defiance" for Best Investigative Journalism
- CINE Golden Eagle Award "So Close So Far Away" for Best Television Documentary
- Gracie Award for Outstanding News Talk Show: The Stream
- EMMY Award for Outstanding Investigation: "Fault Lines: Haiti In a Time of Cholera"
- Peabody Award :Fault Lines: Haiti In a Time of Cholera"
- Peabody Award Fault Lines: Made In Bangladesh
- Webbys People Voice Award for Best News (Tablet), in the Mobile Apps category: Al Jazeera English Online Magazine
- Grierson Awards|Grierson – Best Documentary on a Contemporary Theme: "Law of the Jungle"
- The George Foster Peabody Award Sheikh Jarrah, My Neighbourhood
- AIBD TV AWARD 2013 "The Best TV Programme on Cross-Cultural Exchange": Camels In the Outback
- Online Media Awards for Best Technical Innovation: Syria Defector Tracker
- Online Media Awards for Outstanding Digital Team Commendation: The Stream
- Online Media Awards for Best World News Website Commendation: Al Jazeera English Online
- Online Media Awards for Best Crowd Sourcing Commendation : Al Jazeera English Online Kenyan election coverage
- Online Media Awards for Best Twitter Feed Commendation : The Stream
- New York Festivals International Television & Film Awards : Bronze Prize for 101 East: Australia's Lost Generation
- New York Festivals International Television & Film Awards : Silver Prize for Lockerbie: Case Closed
- Human Rights Press Awards : 101 East: Nowhere To Go
- Human Rights Press Awards: 101 East: Battered and Bruised
- Foreign Press Association Award: The Cure: Doctors on Everest best science story
- Foreign Press Association Award: Earthrise: Urban Oil Men best environment
- Asia TV Awards: 101 East, Best Current Affairs Programme

== 2014 ==
- Women's Empowerment Journalism Broadcast Story Of The Year: 101 East: Nepal's Slave Girls
- The George Foster Peabody Award Fault Lines: Haiti in a Time of Cholera
- The George Foster Peabody Award Fault Lines: Made in Bangladesh
- The Webby Awards for Best Online Film in the News and Politics category: The Stream, Meme-ifying Black Interviewees
- Hong Kong Human Rights Awards Al Jazeera English took home the highest number of awards this year, with four for 101 East programmes, and for Witness's Wukan: Flame of Democracy.
- ChopShots Documentary Film Festival Best International Documentary: Wukan
- Monte Carlo TV Festival Golden Nymph for Best News Documentary: Identity and Exile
- Online Media Awards Simon Hooper - Best Freelance Journalist
- Online Media Awards for Outstanding Digital Team Commendation: AJE Interactives
- The George Foster Peabody Award Fault Lines: Haiti in a Time of Cholera, and Made In Bangladesh.
- International Emmys Fault Lines: Haiti in a Time of Cholera
- World Media Summit award 101 East for 'Exemplary News Team in Developing Countries'.
- New York Festivals Gold for 101 East: It's a Man's World, 101 East: Murder in a God's Name, and Everest 60th Anniversary.

== 2015 ==
- New York Film Festival Gold for 101 East's The Return of the Lizard King, The Dolphin Hunters and Stray Bullets.
- New York Film Festival Gold Award for Steve Chao as Best News Reporter/Correspondent
- Mohamed Amin Awards Best Documentary 'Africa Investigates – Liberia: Living with Ebola'
- Online Media Awards Outstanding Digital Team: Palestine Remix, Al Jazeera English Online
- Online Media Awards Best Technical Innovation Palestine Remix
- Online Media Awards Best Use of Photography Portrait of an Yogi
- One World Media Awards Best Digital Media Award: Pirate Fishing
- One World Media Awards Women's Rights in Africa Award: Witness - Casablanca Calling
- Native American Journalists Association TV Best Feature Story to Shihab Rattansi & Anar Virji for Havasupai water story
- Native American Journalists Association TV Best News Story to Shihab Rattansi and Anar Virji for Tar Creek

== 2016 ==
- The United Nations Correspondents Association's Ricardo Ortega Memorial Prize Bronze Medal: James Bays and Whitney Hurst
- Asian Television Awards' Cable & Satellite Channel of the Year
- Asian Television Awards' Cable & Satellite Network of the Year
- BassAwards Best TV Programme Branding silver award: "In Search of Putin's Russia"
- Catholic Academy Gabriel Awards Internet Video (less than 10 minutes): "One Woman's Strength is Helping Refugees in Macedonia"
- Human Rights Press Awards:101 East's "Sabah's Invisible Children"
- Native American Journalism Association Awards: Shihab Rattansi and Anar Virji for Food Sovereignty and the Passamaquoddy
- Native American Journalism Association Awards: Shihab Rattansi and Anar Virji for Oil exploration and land loss in Louisiana
- Native American Journalism Association Awards: Shihab Rattansi and Anar Virji for coverage of a toxic spill in Colorado's Animas River
- Online Media Awards Best Website of the Year
- Online Media Awards Online Editor of the Year: Yasir Khan
- Online Media Awards Most Effective Media Tool: Al Jazeera Newsroom Toolbox (ANT)
- Online Media Awards Best Use of Photography: "Banished: Why menstruation can mean exile in Nepal"
- PromaxBDA Europe Awards Silver News/Information Channel Spots or Programme Campaign: Hear the Human Story
- PromaxBDA Europe Awards Gold Consumer or Trade Print Ad - Channel: Liter of Light
- The AIB Awards Politics and Business: 101 East "Duterte: A President's Report Card"
- The United Nations Correspondents Association's Ricardo Ortega Memorial Prize Silver Medal: Rosiland Jordan for UN chief raises alarm on Somalia crisis
- The United Nations Correspondents Association's International Prize Silver Medal: Azad Essa for Why do some peacekeepers rape? The full report

== 2017 ==
- The AIB Awards Interactive: "Voyage to Antarctica"

== 2018 ==
- The AIB Awards Politics and Business: "101 East - China: Spies, Lies & Blackmail"
- The AIB Awards Arts and Culture: "Sudan's Forgotten Films"
- The AIB Awards International Affairs Documentary: "The Cut"
- BRAC Migration Media Award: Mahmud Hossain Opu for his coverage of the plight of the Rohingya
- CINE Gold Eagle Award: Fault Lines – "Haiti by Force: UN Sex Abuse"
- EMMY Award for Outstanding Continuing Coverage of a News Story in a Newsmagazine: "Fault Lines: The Ban"
- Foreign Press Association's Arts and Culture Story of the Year Award: "Sudan's Forgotten Films"
- Kaleidoscope Award: "Closer than they Appear"
- New York Festivals International Television & Film Gala's Broadcaster of the Year
- One World Media Award's Women Entrepreneurs Reporting Award: "Earthrise - Jordan's Water Wise Women."
- Online Journalism Award's Immersive Storytelling Award: "Yemen's Skies of Terror"
- Peabody Award: Fatma Naib for "The Cut"
- The Drum Online Media Awards' Video Team of the Year: AJ Shorts
- Walkley Award for Coverage of a Major News Event or Issue: 101 East team for "Rohingya Refugee Crisis"

== 2019 ==
- Two Walkley Awards – Al Jazeera English & Investigations Unit (Dec 1, 2019)
- Five Lovie Awards – for "All Hail the Algorithm" (Nov 17, 2019)
- Two AIB Awards – for earthrise and "How to Sell a Massacre" (Nov 7, 2019)
- Emmy Award – Fault Lines' "Adoption Inc," Outstanding Investigative Report in a Newsmagazine (Sep 25, 2019)
- Kennedy Award – Outstanding Investigative Reporting, Al Jazeera Investigative Unit (Aug 20, 2019)
- Human Rights Press Award – "Growing up too Fast in Afghanistan," Short Video category, Hong Kong (May 22, 2019)
- New York Festivals' Broadcaster of the Year – plus 18 gold, 17 silver, 14 bronze medals (Apr 10, 2019)
- Edward R. Murrow Award (Overseas Press Club) – Fault Lines' "No Shelter: Family Separation at the Border" (Mar 21, 2019)
- RTS Award for Interview of the Year – 101 East's "Malaysia: Najib Speaks" (Feb 28, 2019)

== 2020 ==
- FPA Media Awards (Foreign Press Association) – Arts & Culture Story of the Year for "Hillbilly" (Witness) and Science Story of the Year for "Kyrgyzstan's Space School" (Women Make Science)
- AIB Awards – Science and Technology category for "The World According to AI" (The Big Picture)
- Venice TV Awards – Gold Winner, Cross-Platform Programming, for "The $5 Forests" (101 East)
- Native American Journalists Association Awards – First and Second Place, TV Best Coverage of Native America, plus an Honorable Mention for Best News Story
- Music+Sound Awards – Best Original Composition in Branding, for Al Jazeera English's sonic branding (produced by Sonic Lens Agency)
- Webby Awards – People's Voice Award (Social, News & Politics) for coverage of the Rohingya crisis, and a Jury Win for "My People, Our Stories: Homelessness in Los Angeles" (AJ Contrast)
- Drum Online Media Awards – Two First Place wins and two Highly Commended Second Place distinctions
- Shorty Awards – Gold Audience Honor for the Start Here explainer series, Audience Honor for the AJEnglish Twitter team, and Gold Audience Honor for "All Hail the Algorithm"
- New York Festival TV & Film Awards – Broadcaster of the Year (fourth consecutive year), plus gold, silver, and bronze medals for news coverage and programmes

== 2021 ==
- British Journalism Awards – Sports Journalism category for "The Men Who Sell Football" (I-Unit)
- FPA Award (Foreign Press Association) – Arts & Culture Story of the Year for "Battle for the BBC" (The Listening Post)
- Amnesty International Australia Media Awards – Print/Online category for "The $5 Forests" (101 East)
- Lovie Awards – 21 total wins, including 10 Jury awards and 11 People's Lovie awards
- AIB Awards (Association of International Broadcaster Awards) – Channel of the Year, plus two additional awards in Continuing News Reporting and Arts and Culture categories
- New York Festivals TV & Film Awards – Broadcaster of the Year (fifth consecutive year), plus gold, silver, and bronze medals for programmes and news coverage
- DIG Awards (Italy) – Best Long Investigative and Best Audio for "All the Prime Minister's Men" (Investigative Unit)
- One World Media Awards – Best Print and Women's Entrepreneur Reporting awards for features on women and children in East and West Africa
- One World Media Awards – International Journalist of the Year, Drew Ambrose (101 East)
- Telly Awards – Company of the Year, plus more than 140 Telly awards overall including 25 Gold awards
- Wincott Award – Video Journalism of the Year for "Selling Out West Papua" (101 East)
- RTS Award (Royal Television Society) – Breaking News category for coverage of the Beirut Blast
- RTS Award (Royal Television Society) – Judges' Award for the technical team's work during the COVID-19 pandemic

== 2022 ==
- Robert F. Kennedy Journalism Award – for Fault Lines episode "Unrelinquished: When Abusers Keep Their Guns"
- Broadcast Production Awards (Newscast Studio) – 10 awards won
- New York Festivals TV & Film Awards – Broadcaster of the Year (sixth consecutive year), plus gold, silver, and bronze medals for news and programmes coverage
- Sigma Awards – winner for "This is Myanmar's State of Fear" (101 East and AJ Labs collaboration)
- IRE Awards (Investigative Reporters and Editors) – Digital Video category for "The Island of Secrets" (Investigative Unit)
- British Sports Journalism Awards – Gold in Television/Digital Documentary category and Bronze in Audio/Radio Documentary category, both for The Men Who Sold Football (Investigative Unit)
- Walkley Awards for Excellence in Journalism – Production category for "This is Myanmar's State of Fear" (101 East)
- RTS TV Journalism Awards (Royal Television Society) – Digital Award category for "All Hail the Lockdown" and Home Affairs category for "The Men Who Sell Football" (Investigative Unit)

== 2023 ==
- New York Festivals TV & Film Awards – Broadcaster of the Year (seventh consecutive year)
- George Polk Award – Foreign Television Reporting category, for "The Killing of Shireen Abu Akleh" (Fault Lines)

== 2024 ==
- FPA Award (Foreign Press Association) – Environment and Science Story of the Year for "A Crude Mistake" (People and Power)
- AIB Award (Association for International Broadcasting) – for coverage of the Gaza genocide (Al Jazeera English)
- News Emmy Awards – two awards, honoring Bisan Owda and Fault Lines
- Hinzpeter Award – "The World at a Crossroads" category, for Voices from Gaza films Rescue Mission Gaza and A Child of Gaza (Witness)
- One World Media Awards – Women's Solutions Reporting category for India's Women Combat Fighters (101 East), and Current Affairs category for The Confession (Fault Lines)
- Walkley Foundation Award – Humanitarian Storytelling award, for an episode of the Mindset series
- National Headliner Award – Health/Science category for "The Pesticide Playbook" (Fault Lines)
- OPC Award (Overseas Press Club of America) – Edward R. Murrow category for Rescue Mission Gaza (Witness)
- Pimentel Fonseca Civil Journalism Award – awarded to Youmna El Sayed for her Gaza reporting
- New York Festivals TV & Film Awards – Broadcaster of the Year (eighth consecutive year)
- Wilbur Award (Religion Communicators Council) – for "Secrets of the Clergy" (Fault Lines)
- RTS Award (Royal Television Society) – Current Affairs – International category for Rescue Mission Gaza (Witness)

== 2025 ==
- FPA Media Award (Foreign Press Association) – Radio and Podcast of the Year, for coverage of Sheikh Hasina's final days as prime minister (Investigative Unit)
- Hinzpeter Award – Yu Young-gil Award, for "Kids Under Fire" (Fault Lines)
- Creativepool Awards – Bronze Award, Out of Home Campaign category (Marketing, Global Brand and Communications Division)
- Covering Climate Now (CCNow) Journalism Awards – two awards: Large Projects and Collaborations category for "Dying Earth" series, and Politics, Policy and Climate Action category for "Deadly Heat" (Fault Lines)
- Edward R. Murrow Awards – four honours secured
- Sigma Delta Chi Award (Society of Professional Journalists) – Television Sports Reporting, for "The Big Gamble" (Fault Lines)
- News and Documentary Emmy Awards – two awards for "Children of the Darien Gap," in Outstanding Hard News Feature - Long Form and Outstanding Editing – News categories (Fault Lines)
- Golden Nymph Award (Monte-Carlo TV Festival) – Best Major News Report, News & Documentaries category, for "Please Enjoy Our Tragedies" (Witness)
- Peabody Awards – two awards, for "The Night Won't End" (Fault Lines) and "One Day in Gaza"
- Overseas Press Club of America Awards – two documentaries recognized (Fault Lines)
- RTS Award (Royal Television Society) – International Current Affairs category, for "The Night Won't End: Biden's War on Gaza" (Fault Lines)

== 2026 ==
- One World Media Award – Women's Solution Reporting, for "One Month in Ramallah" (Witness)
- News and Documentary Emmy Awards – three Emmys for two investigative films (Fault Lines)
- IRE Award (Investigative Reporters and Editors) – International Outstanding Video category, for "Kids Under Fire" (Fault Lines)
- Peabody Award (News category) – for "Kids Under Fire" and "The Disappearance of Dr Abu Safiya" (Fault Lines)
- Peabody Award (Interactive category) – for "Investigating War Crimes in Gaza" (investigative team)
- OPC Award (Overseas Press Club) – International Affairs, for "Hasina: 36 Days in July"
- RTS Award (Royal Television Society) – Breaking News category, for coverage of the Fall of the Assad regime in Syria
