= Ray Suarez =

American journalist (born 1957)

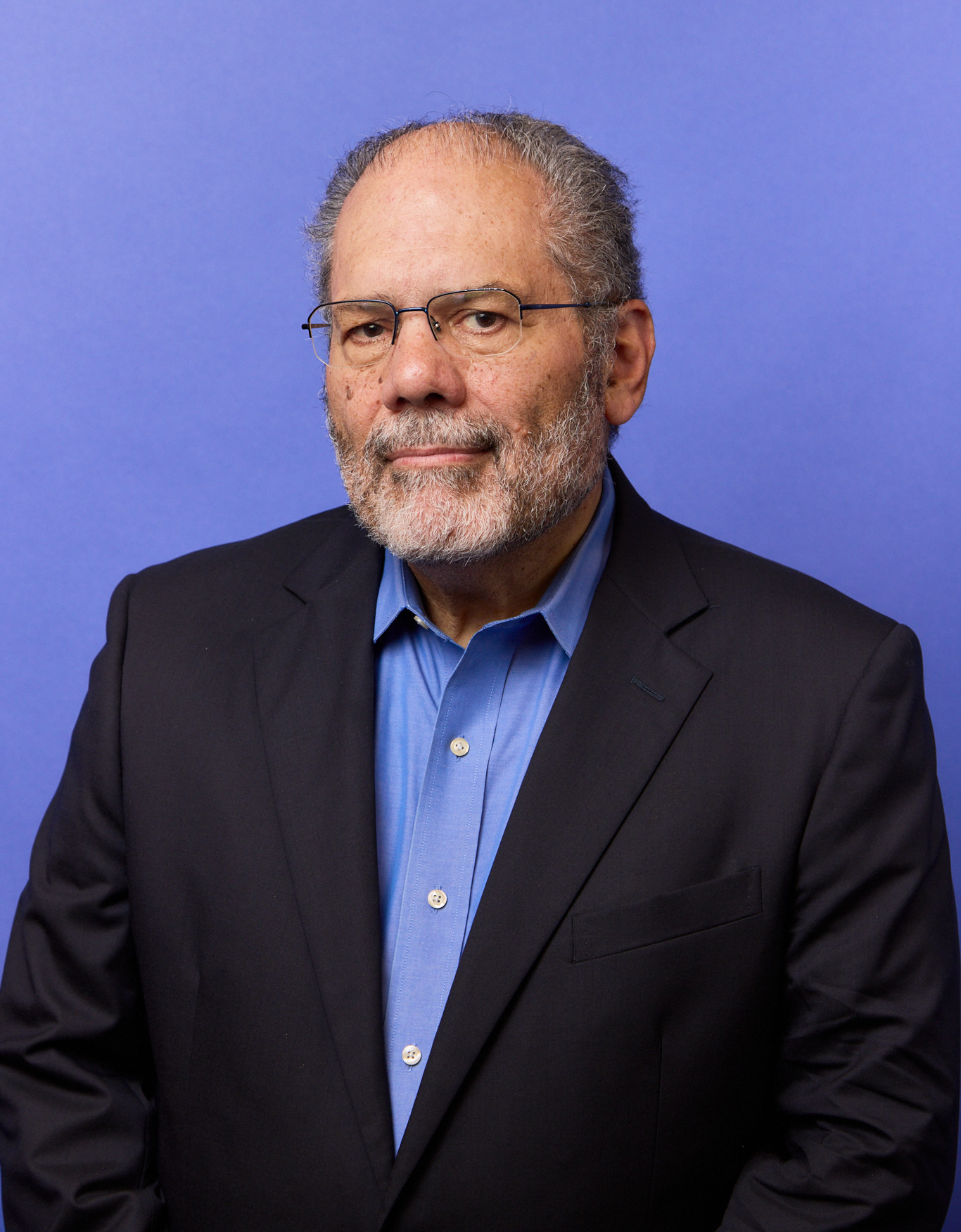
- Suarez at the National Association of Hispanic Journalists conference in 2025
- Born: Rafael Suarez, Jr. March 5, 1957 (age 69); Brooklyn, New York, U.S.
- Education: BA, New York University; MA, University of Chicago
- Occupations: Journalist, Anchor
- Notable credit(s): PBS NewsHour, Talk of the Nation, A.M. Weather, American RadioWorks, Inside Story
- Spouse: Carole Suarez
- Children: Rafael, Eva and Isabel

Rafael Suarez, Jr. (born March 5, 1957), known as Ray Suarez, is an American broadcast journalist and author. He is currently host of the PBS series "Wisdom Keepers" set to premiere on the public network in June 2025. He was a visiting professor at NYU Shanghai in 2022, and was previously the John J. McCloy Visiting professor of American Studies at Amherst College. For 7 years from 2018 to 2025, Suarez hosted a radio program and several podcast series: On Shifting Ground for KQED-FM, Going for Broke for the Economic Hardship Reporting Project, and "The Things I Thought About When My Body Was Trying to Kill Me" on cancer and recovery for Evergreen Podcasts. His latest book, on modern American immigration to the US, "We Are Home: Becoming American in the 21st Century," was published by Little, Brown in 2024. He was the host of Inside Story on Al Jazeera America Story, a daily news program on Al Jazeera America, until that network ceased operation in 2016. Suarez joined the PBS NewsHour in 1999 and was a senior correspondent for the evening news program on the PBS television network until 2013. He was also host of the international news and analysis public radio program America Abroad from Public Radio International. He was the host of the National Public Radio program Talk of the Nation from 1993 to 1999. In his more than 40-year career in the news business, he has also worked as a radio reporter in London and Rome, as a Los Angeles correspondent for CNN, and as a reporter for the NBC-owned station WMAQ-TV in Chicago. From 2020-2022, he was one of the US correspondents for Euronews.

== Personal life ==
Born and raised in Brooklyn by a Puerto Rican family, Suarez attended public schools in the borough from kindergarten through 12th grade, graduating in 1974 from John Dewey High School. In 1975, he earned the rank of Eagle Scout in the Brooklyn Council. In 2009, Suarez was awarded the Distinguished Eagle Scout Award by the NCAC. He earned a BA in African History from New York University and an MA in the Social Sciences from the University of Chicago. He and his wife Carole live in Washington, D.C. They are parents to three adult children, Rafael, Eva, and Isabel. Suarez is active locally and nationally in the Episcopal Church, serving on the governing body of Washington National Cathedral, the Cathedral Chapter, from 2016-2024.

== Career and publications ==
Suarez began working at the campus radio station of New York University upon enrolling there as a student in 1974 and eventually became the station's news director. He subsequently moved to the university's newspaper. He later worked as a freelance reporter in London and Rome, and in 1981 his coverage of the attempted assassination of Pope John Paul II led to him being hired by CBS Radio. He was, in turn, hired by ABC and then CNN. He moved to Chicago in 1986 to become a general assignment reporter and substitute anchor for the NBC owned-and-operated WMAQ-TV, where he worked for 7 years. He then headed to Washington, DC, where he was hired by NPR to be the host of the daily news call-in program Talk of the Nation. He became a regular correspondent for the PBS NewsHour on October 4, 1999. Between 2009 and 2013, he was one of the program's rotating group of anchors.

He is the author of four books. The most recent is "We Are Home: Becoming American in the 21st Century," published by Little, Brown in 2024. Other works include Latino Americans: The 500 Year Legacy That Shaped a Nation published by Penguin/Celebra in 2013. He is also the author of the 1999 book The Old Neighborhood: What We Lost in the Great Suburban Migration: 1966-1999, a social commentary on the causes of the destitution found in the inner city. In 2006, he authored The Holy Vote: The Politics of Faith in America, which examines the way Americans worship, how organized religion and politics intersect in America, and how this powerful collision is transforming the current and future American mind-set. The book is beginning to gather accolades for its timeliness and fair coverage from many sides of the issue. Suarez was a contributing editor for Si Magazine, a short-lived magazine depicting the Latino experience in the U.S.

Suarez hosted the program Destination Casa Blanca, produced by HITN TV from 2008 to 2011. The program covered Latino politics and policy for a national audience from Washington, D.C.

He is a contributor to the Oxford Companion to American Politics (June 2012), and wrote the companion volume to a PBS documentary series on the history of Latinos in America, Latino Americans: The 500-Year History That Shaped a Nation published by Penguin in 2013.

Suarez has contributed to many other books, including How I Learned English, Brooklyn: A State of Mind, Saving America's Treasures, and About Men. His columns, op-eds, and criticism have been published in The New York Times, the Washington Post, and the Chicago Tribune.

He co-wrote and hosted the 2009 documentary for PBS Jerusalem: Center of the World, and narrated for PBS Anatomy of a Pandemic, on the H1N1 outbreak.

In October 2021, the first two episodes of Suarez's podcast series Going for Broke were released by The Nation magazine in partnership with the Economic Hardship Reporting Project.

== Select honors ==
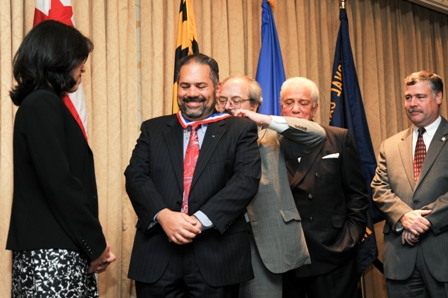
Suarez receiving his Distinguished Eagle Scout Award

- Named as a 1996 Utne Reader "Visionaries"
- Named as Hispanic Business "100 Influentials" among American Latinos
- 1995 Global Awareness Award by Current History Magazine
- 1996 Studs Terkel Award, Community Media Workshop
- 1993-94 duPont-Columbia Silver Baton Awards (part of NPR's award for on-site coverage of the first all-race elections in South Africa)
- 1994-95 duPont-Columbia Silver Baton Awards (part of NPR's award for coverage of the first 100 days of the 104th Congress)
- 1996 Rubén Salazar Award from the National Council of La Raza
- 2005 Distinguished Policy Leadership Award from UCLA's School of Public Policy
- Distinguished Alumnus Award from NYU, 2005
- Professional Achievement Award from the University of Chicago,
- 2009 - Distinguished Eagle Scout
- 2010-Hall of Fame, National Association of Hispanic Journalists
- 2012- Bridge-Builder Award, Tanenbaum Center for Interreligious Understanding
- 2013 Schwartz Visiting Fellow, Pomfret School, Pomfret CT.
- Honorary doctorates, 16, including:
  - St. John's University Doctor of Laws, 2003
  - Muhlenberg College Doctor of Humane Letters, 2006
  - Lewis and Clark College, Doctor of Humane Letters, 2009
  - Utica College, Doctor of Letters, 2010
  - University of the South, Doctor of Humane Letters, 2012
  - Kalamazoo College, Doctor of Humane Letters
  - City College of New York, Doctor of Humane Letters, 2012
  - Chicago Theological Seminary Doctor of Letters, 2013
  - Longwood University, Doctor of Human Letters, 2021
  - Salve Regina University Doctor of Humane Letters, 2025

== Bibliographies ==
Suarez, Ray (2013). Latino Americans: The 500-Year History That Shaped a Nation. New York: Penguins Book. ISBN 978-0451238146.

== See also ==
- National Association of Hispanic Journalists
