= Win Every Argument =

2023 non-fiction book by Mehdi Hasan

Win Every Argument: The Art of Debating, Persuading, and Public Speaking
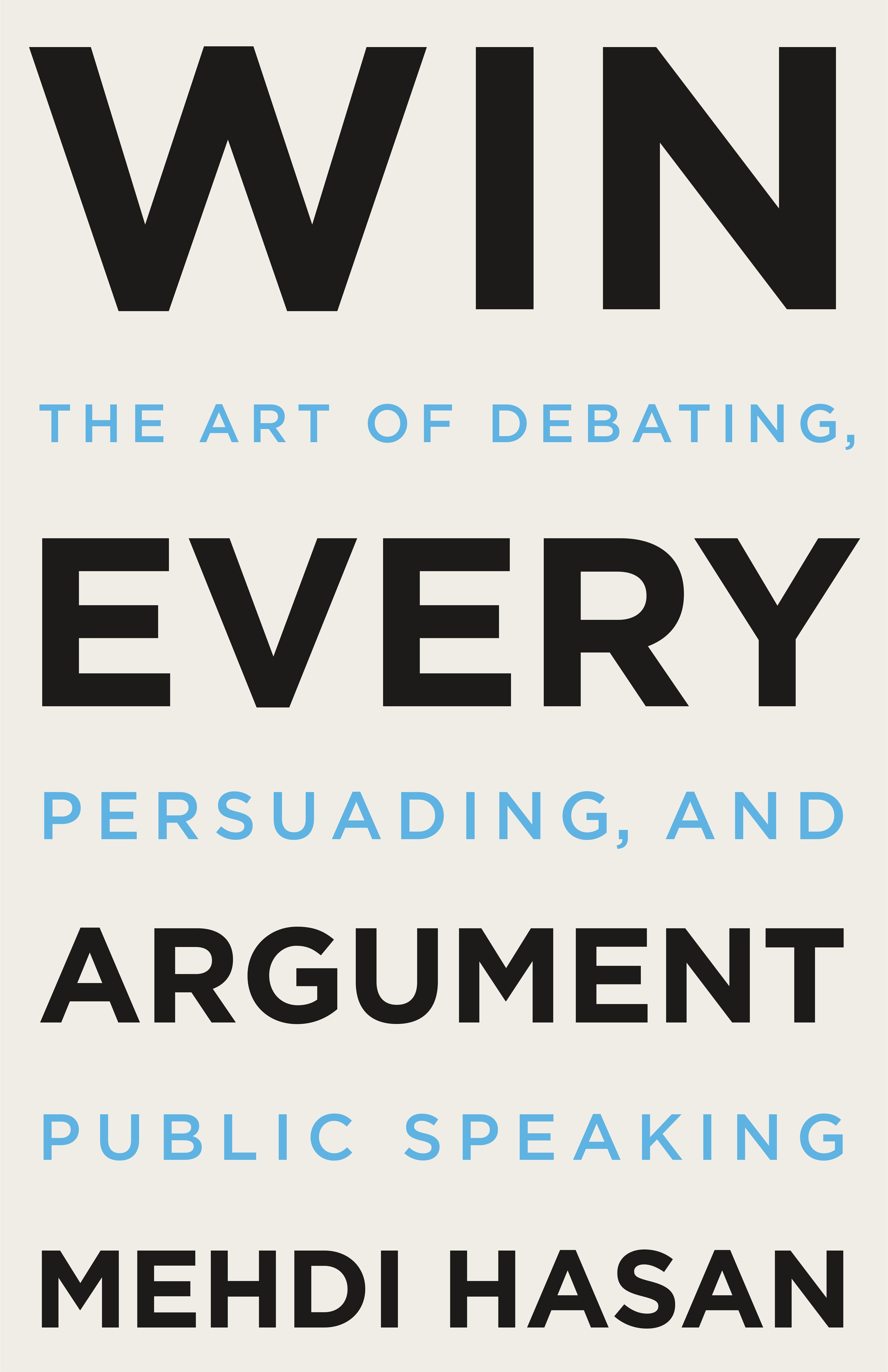
- Author: Mehdi Hasan
- Language: English
- Genre: Non-fiction
- Publisher: Henry Holt and Company
- Publication date: February 28, 2023
- Pages: 336
- ISBN: 978-1-250-85347-9

Win Every Argument: The Art of Debating, Persuading, and Public Speaking is a 2023 non-fiction book by Mehdi Hasan.

== Publication ==
Win Every Argument is a 336-page non-fiction book written by former MSNBC journalist Mehdi Hasan, and published in 2023 by Henry Holt and Company.

== Synopsis ==
The book presents readers with a sixteen-step process to win arguments, and includes advice on tactics including understanding the audience and use of facts, humour, and emotion. It encourages debaters to both prepare well and listen carefully. It includes quotes and stories from Hasan's professional experience.

== Critical reception ==
Win Every Argument was described by Noelia Martinez, writing in Library Journal, as a "great resource" for people in academic and corporate environments.

Win Every Argument first appeared on The New York Times Best Seller list at #7 for the category of Advice, How-To & Miscellaneous for the week of March 19, 2023.
