= The Old Neighborhood (book) =

1999 book by Ray Suarez

The Old Neighborhood: What We Lost in the Great Suburban Migration: 1966–1999
- Author: Ray Suarez
- Language: English
- Genre: Non-fiction
- Publisher: Free Press
- Publication date: May 1, 1999
- Publication place: United States
- Pages: 272
- ISBN: 0-684-83402-2

The Old Neighborhood: What We Lost in the Great Suburban Migration: 1966–1999 is a 1999 non-fiction book by Ray Suarez. It describes the process of urban flight, as it has occurred in the United States from the 1960s to the 1990s.
