= UpFront =

- Title card
- Presented by: Marc Lamont Hill
- Country of origin: United States

Production
- Production location: Washington D.C.
- Running time: 30 minutes

Original release
- Network: Al Jazeera English
- Release: September 2015

UpFront is a current affairs discussion, debate and analysis programme on Al Jazeera English. The show premiered on 4 September 2015 shortly after Al Jazeera moved into their new Washington D.C. hub. The show has a politics focus although other subjects are broached such as religion, economics, development and government activities. The show is weekly and premieres new episodes on Fridays.

The programme is centred around current affairs with each episode dedicated to one or two topics. Typically each episode consists of the host doing an interview with a guest on a particular subject, which is followed by a debate on the subject.

The premiere episode featured an interview with Edward Snowden about the National Security Agency leaks. Other notable guests have included the foreign minister of Qatar about Qatar's role in Syria, Saudi Arabia foreign minister Abdallah al-Mouallimi about why democracy is good for Syria but not Saudi Arabia, Noam Chomsky, philosopher Slavoj Žižek, former Israeli Prime Minister Ehud Olmert, various UN officials and various countries members of parliament. The show was originally hosted by Mehdi Hasan from its debut until October 2020 when Hasan departed to host a show on Peacock. He was temporarily replaced as host by Richelle Carey, then by Marc Lamont Hill on a permanent basis in 2021.
