= Al Jazirah, Sharjah =

Al Jazirah
- Location within United Arab Emirates
- Coordinates: 25°21′0″N 55°22′0″E
- Country: United Arab Emirates
- Emirate: Sharjah
- Elevation: 12 m (39 ft)

Al Jazirah (Arabic: الجزيرة) is a settlement in Sharjah.
