= John Harwood (journalist) =

American journalist (born 1956)

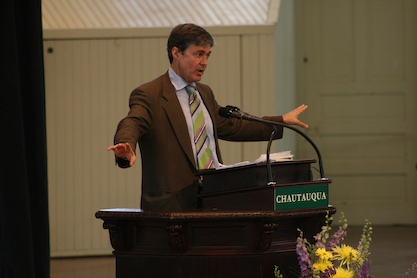
- John Harwood, June 24, 2007
- Born: November 5, 1956 (age 69); Louisville, Kentucky, U.S.
- Education: Duke University
- Occupation: Journalist

John Harwood (born November 5, 1956) is an American journalist. He was the White House Correspondent for CNN from February 2021 until September 2022, after working as an editor-at-large for CNBC. He was the chief Washington Correspondent for CNBC and a contributor for The New York Times. He wrote a weekly column entitled "The Caucus" that appeared on Monday about Washington politics and policy. Before joining the Times, he wrote for The Wall Street Journal.

== Early life and education ==
Harwood's father, Richard Harwood, was a reporter and writer for The Louisville Times and The Washington Post. According to John Harwood's article in The Washington Post (April 30, 2000, page B4), Harwood's mother was an active campaigner for the presidential campaign of Robert F. Kennedy in 1968. Harwood, at age 11, appeared in a television ad for Kennedy's 1968 campaign.

Harwood graduated from Bethesda-Chevy Chase High School, where he edited the school newspaper, The Tattler. (Harwood was the commencement speaker for the high school's graduating class of 2010.) While in high school, Harwood served as a copy boy for the Washington Star, his first journalism job.

Harwood attended Duke University, studying history and economics there. He graduated magna cum laude in 1978.

== Journalism career ==
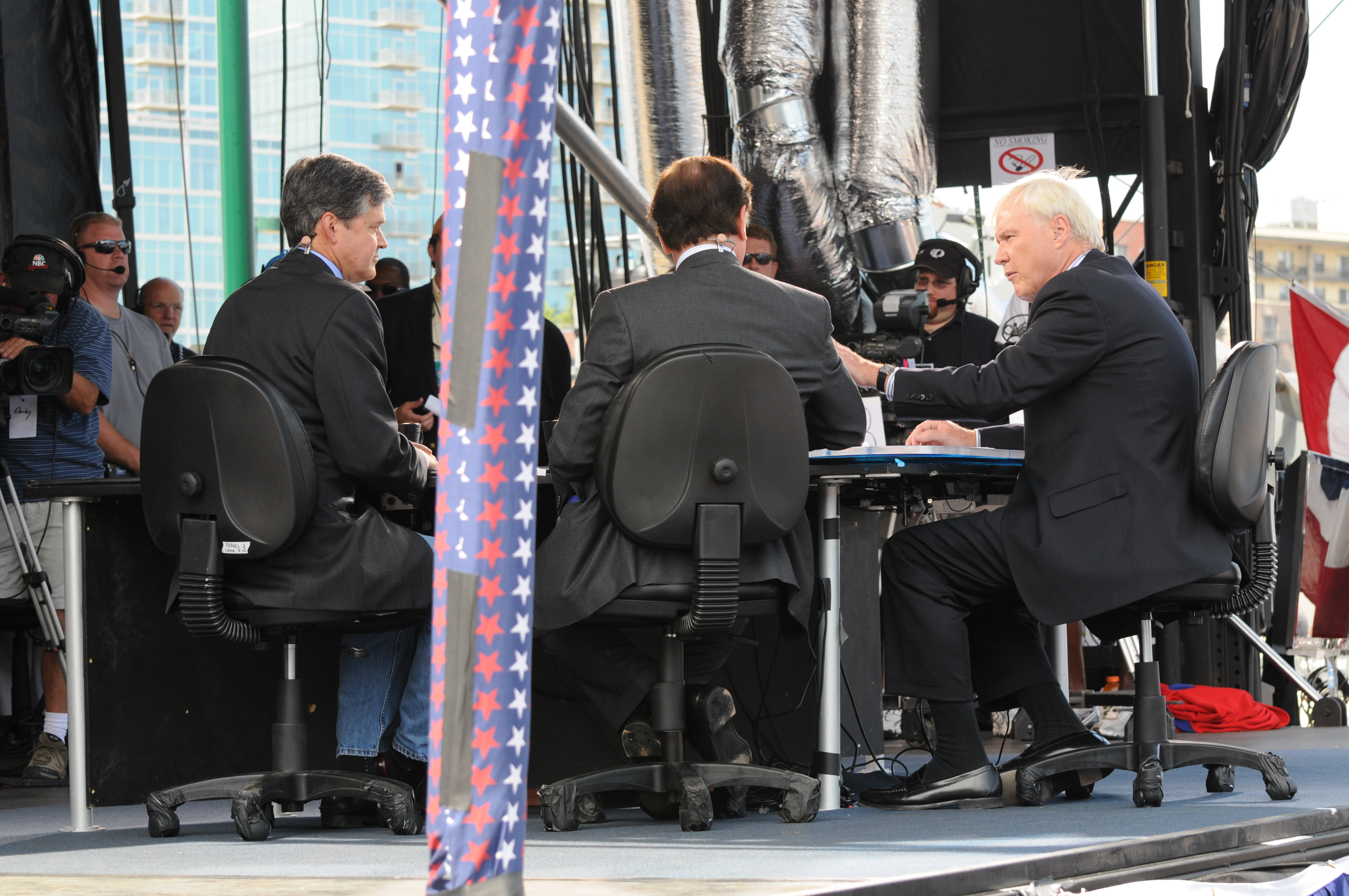
Harwood and Howard Fineman appearing on Hardball with Chris Matthews (2008)

After graduating from college, Harwood joined the St. Petersburg Times in Florida, working in Tampa Bay, Tallahassee, and Washington. He traveled to South Africa, covering developments in the final years of apartheid. He was a Nieman Fellow at Harvard University from 1989 to 1990. He became the White House correspondent for the Wall Street Journal in 1991, covering the George H. W. Bush administration. He subsequently became a Capitol Hill correspondent and, in 1997, political editor and chief political correspondent for the newspaper. Harwood became chief Washington correspondent for CNBC in March 2006.

Harwood frequently appears on Washington Week, a public affairs program on PBS formerly hosted by Gwen Ifill, as well as NBC's Meet the Press, and MSNBC's Morning Joe. He and co-author Gerald Seib were Tim Russert's guests in Russert's last taped interview for Russert's MSNBC eponymous interview program, which was to air the weekend of June 14, 2008, just hours before Russert's death.

Harwood was a moderator for CNBC's Republican primary presidential debate on October 28, 2015. Harwood was criticized by both the debate candidates, the media and his own CNBC colleagues for his performance as moderator.

Harwood saw further criticism after the personal email account of John Podesta, who was then chairman of the 2016 Hillary Clinton presidential campaign, was hacked and had its contents published by the website WikiLeaks in October and November 2016. Among the emails were several from Harwood that some critics said indicated an unprofessional level of closeness or collusion between the two, including an email from May 2015 in which Harwood warned Podesta that then-candidate Ben Carson could represent "real trouble" to the Clinton campaign. The emails also revealed that Harwood had asked Podesta which questions he should ask Republican candidate Jeb Bush during a debate.

Harwood drew scrutiny from conservative critics on February 6, 2020, when he stated that President Donald Trump was in "deep psychological distress" following his press conference after the U.S. Senate voted to acquit him on both articles of impeachment. On September 2, 2022, Harwood announced his departure from CNN via Twitter, which many sources believe was unplanned, following a meeting with CNN's then-new CEO/Chairman Chris Licht. Licht at the time was trying to "shift CNN into a more moderate voice", a stance which in turn was attributed by some to John Malone. Malone had told CNBC in 2021 that "he'd like to see CNN evolve back to the kind of journalism that it started with, and actually have journalists, which would be unique and refreshing."
