= Al Jazeera Mubasher =

Qatari international Arabic language pan-regional public affairs network

- Country: Qatar
- Broadcast area: Arab world
- Network: Al Jazeera
- Headquarters: Doha, Qatar

Programming
- Language: Arabic

Ownership
- Parent: Al Jazeera Media Network
- Sister channels: Al Jazeera English; Al Jazeera; Al Jazeera Balkans; Al Jazeera Documentary Channel

History
- Launched: 14 April 2005; 21 years ago

Links
- Website: Al Jazeera Mubasher

Availability

Streaming media
- Al Jazeera Mubasher: aljazeeramubasher.net/live
- YouTube: youtube.com/@aljazeeramubasher/live

Al Jazeera Mubasher (AJM; Arabic: الجزيرة مباشر) is a public affairs television network launched by Al Jazeera Media Network on April 15, 2005. It is an Arabic channel based in Doha, Qatar that broadcasts conferences and other events live without editing or commentary, using subtitles when translation is needed. The channel is also sometimes referred to as Al Jazeera Live, as mubasher is an Arabic word for live (as in live broadcast).

Al Jazeera Mubasher is the first channel of its kind in the Middle East, broadcasting 24-hour live news and events—similar to the US channel C-SPAN and UK channel BBC Parliament. The channel also has a live stream of its broadcast on its website.

In 2014, the channel underwent a graphics upgrade as part of Al Jazeera Media Networks' graphics upgrade across the company.

The channel has remote feeds and on-the-ground cameras broadcasting political gatherings, press conferences, discussions, and meetings, broadcasting the latest on political, social, cultural and economic affairs. The channel feed mainly provides live and uncut footage.

On December 20, 2014, it was announced that Al Jazeera Media Network would coalesce both Al Jazeera Mubasher and the temporarily suspended Al Jazeera Mubasher Misr into a combined channel called Al Jazeera Al-‘Amma (AJMG) or Al Jazeera Live General.

== Egyptian channel ==
A channel called Al Jazeera Mubasher Misr (AJMM; Arabic: الجزيرة مباشر مصر), similar to its original sister channel minus some commentary, operated in Egypt, based in Cairo, from 2011 to 2014. The channel was shut down by the Egyptian government after the removal of Mohamed Morsi due to its perceived pro-Brotherhood slant. The channel's staff were arrested but later released.

From 2013 until its suspension, AJMM broadcast from Al Jazeera's Doha headquarters, running video brought in through other sources such as YouTube and Reuters, and press conferences taped from other news organizations in the country.

In an official statement released by the Al Jazeera Media Network on December 22, 2014, Al Jazeera's Public Relations team stated that Al Jazeera Mubasher Misr would cease broadcasting until the situation allows for it. The decision came in the wake of a restoration of ties between Qatar and Egypt during the fourth quarter of 2014. This was during a period in which Saudi Arabia and the United Arab Emirates were applying pressure on Qatar over its relationship with the Muslim Brotherhood and other Islamist groups and movements. The move resulted in much of the staff of Al Jazeera Mubasher Misr being absorbed into Al Jazeera Arabic and Al Jazeera Mubasher, such as news anchors Ayman Azzam and Ahmed Taha. Ahmed Taha, who is Egyptian himself, is known to push guests on their opinions regarding Egypt's President Abdel Fattah el-Sisi. This has resulted in Taha having legal troubles with the Egyptian Judiciary. In May 2022, an Egyptian Court sentenced Taha to 15 years in prison in absentia for interviewing former Egyptian Presidential Candidate Abdel Moneim Aboul Fotouh. Al Jazeera Mubasher Al‘Amma is transmitting on the frequencies of both Al Jazeera Mubasher and the defunct Al Jazeera Mubasher Misr. As of March 2024, Al Jazeera Mubasher Misr remains off the air.
