= Aljazeera Publishing =

Publishing company

Al Jazeera Publishing
- Type: Publishing Company
- Country: United Arab Emirates
- Availability: Worldwide
- Launch date: 1992
- Dissolved: 2011

Aljazeera Publishing was formed in 1992 in London to produce content for expatriate Persian Gulf (i.e. those from the region known as Aljazeera) residents living in the United Kingdom. The publishing was disbanded in April 2011 after the sale of its main assets to regional media organizations including Al Jazeera Media Network, Noor Media and MBC.

Despite the similarity in names, Aljazeera Publishing has no relations nor affiliation with the Qatari state media conglomerate Al Jazeera Media Network.

== Al Jazeera Magazine ==
Aljazeera Publishing first published a monthly magazine in 1992 called Al Jazeera Al Arabia. From its start to 1993 the magazine was published by Shiite opposition groups exiled in London. Since then it has adopted a shortened version of the name as simply Al Jazeera Magazine.

The shortening of the title occurred after an external investment by a Saudi Arabian investment company. Al Jazeera Publishing was highly critical of the Saudi Arabian government’s human rights records and published a number of critical reports in 1993, 1994 and 1995.

These human rights reports raised Al Jazeera Al Arabia’s profile on the Middle East stage. Extracts of such reports were used in a Human Rights Watch report as published in 1993, as well as the Islamic Research and Information Center.

Since 1996 no more anti Saudi Arabian stories appeared in any of Al Jazeera Publishing titles, rather the attention appeared to have turned against the Qatari ruling family with a string of hostile articles such as "Egypt arrests Qatari prince over illegal car race", "Qatari prince convicted of abusing girls", "First church in Muslim Qatar risks backlash" and "Qatar finances sports centre in Israel".

== History of Al Jazeera Magazine ==
Until March 2011, aljazeera.com was an English language website for Al Jazeera Magazine, which was unrelated to the Arabic satellite TV channel Al Jazeera and Al Jazeera English; the latter operated websites in both Arabic (www.aljazeera.net) and English (english.aljazeera.net). It was also unrelated to Al Jazirah Newspaper of Saudi Arabia. According to Alexa, there were fewer visitors to aljazeera.com in comparison to aljazeera.net. The former website was operated by Aljazeera Publishing, described as an "independent media organisation."

== Domain name dispute ==
In 2005, the Al Jazeera Media Network owner of Al Jazeera English attempted to obtain the aljazeera.com domain name but failed.

In the Administrative Panel Decision, the WIPO Arbitration and Mediation Center found the TV Channel to have brought the proceedings in bad faith and found it had abused the administrative proceedings.

As of 2006, Aljazeera.com wrote on their About page:

"Important note: Aljazeera Publishing and Aljazeera.com are not associated with any of the below organisations:

1. Al Jazeera Newspaper, Riyadh, Saudi Arabia whose website is al-jazirah.com
2. Al Jazeera Satellite Channel whose website is aljazeera.net.
3. Al Jazeera Information Centre who website is aljazeerah.info

Aljazeera Publishing disassociates itself from the views, opinions and broadcasts of these titles."

Views presented by Aljazeera.com are frequently misattributed to the Al Jazeera TV channel, including one case in which The Times criticised the channel in its leader column based on material published on Aljazeera.com, for which the newspaper later apologised. The magazine's editorial slant appears markedly different than that of the Al Jazeera TV channel, with the former far more critical of U.S. and Israeli policy than the latter.

In April 2011, the domain aljazeera.com directed to Al Jazeera English, and the domain ownership as listed on WHOIS records was updated from AlJazeera Publishing to Al Jazeera Media Network. At the time of the purchase, a simple page stated "Moving to Doha", leading to certain long-time readers initially suspecting a hack of the website. No public details regarding the purchase of the domain has been made public by either parties.

== Website contents ==
The content on the former Aljazeera.com was organized by section. The following sections existed:

=== Middle East News ===
'Middle East News' contained the latest breaking Middle Eastern news. A number of their stories were accused of reported bias against Israel, Europe and the United States, and even against Latin American countries, such as Mexico and Brazil. News articles often contained paraphrased quotes from familiar news outlets such as Associated Press and the BBC.

=== Review articles ===
'Review Articles' contain longer pieces about recent events. The editorial stance was one of rigorous opposition to the Iraq War, and the articles were usually reported to contain strong condemnations of American involvement in the Middle East and are accused of often reflecting anti-Zionism in describing the state of Israel. One article (entitled "Latest of US lies: Iraqis killing Iraqis" claimed that the sectarian violence occurring in Iraq was supported by CIA and Mossad agents: "It was the U.S.'s 'debaathification' of Iraq that eventually let [sic] to the current death squads, supported by the U.S. and the Mossad agents."

=== 'Let's Talk' ===
'Let's Talk' was a section hosted by Dr. Kareem Bin Jabbar and Sheikha Sajida. Readers sent in questions or topics for discussion, which were published at the discretion of the site. Sajida's theories (such as the notion that the kidnapping of Westerners in Iraq was carried out by agents of the US) frequently stirred up heated debate.

=== 'Reader Comments' ===
Readers could leave comments in all areas except for the Conspiracy Theories section. These comments could be rated from 'Excellent' to 'Very Bad' at the discretion of readers.

== IslamOnline.com ==
Besides Aljazeera Magazine, Al Jazeera Publishing produces IslamOnline.com, which is an English-language Islamic site on the Internet. Since 1998, Al Jazeera Publishing has been involved in a dispute with Islamonline.net. According to whois, the Islamonline.net domain name was registered after IslamOnline.com. IslamOnline.net is much more popular based on statistics from Alexa. Al Jazeera Publishing owns trademark rights for IslamOnline in Europe.

== Disbanding of Al Jazeera Publishing in March 2011 ==
In March 2011 Al Jazeera Media Network acquired Aljazeera.com. Al Jazeera Publishing's other main digital titles including IslamOnline.com, alJazeera Jobs and alJazeera Capital were also sold off as separate individual entities.
