= Al Jazeera English =

Qatari English-language news channel

- Type: News broadcasting, discussions
- Country: Qatar
- Broadcast area: Worldwide
- Headquarters: Doha, Qatar

Programming
- Language: English
- Picture format: 1080i HDTV (downscaled to 16:9 480i/576i for the SDTV feed)

Ownership
- Owner: Al Jazeera Media Network
- Key people: Issa Ali (Managing Director)
- Sister channels: Al Jazeera Arabic; Al Jazeera Mubasher; Al Jazeera Balkans; Al Jazeera Documentary Channel; AJ+

History
- Launched: 15 November 2006; 20 years ago

Links
- Website: aljazeera.com

Al Jazeera English (AJE; Arabic: الجزيرة, romanized: al-jazīrah, lit. 'the island', pronounced [æl (d)ʒæˈziːrɐ]), often known as Al Jazeera, is a 24-hour English-language news channel operating under Al Jazeera Media Network, which is partially funded by the government of Qatar. Al Jazeera introduced an English-language division in 2006. It is the first global English-language news channel to be headquartered in the Middle East.

Al Jazeera is known for its in-depth and frontline reporting particularly in conflict zones such as the Arab Spring, the Gaza–Israel conflict and others. Al Jazeera's coverage of the Arab Spring won the network numerous awards, including the Peabody Award. It positions itself as an alternative media platform to the dominance of Western media outlets like CNN and BBC, focusing on narrative reporting where subjects present their own stories.

== History ==
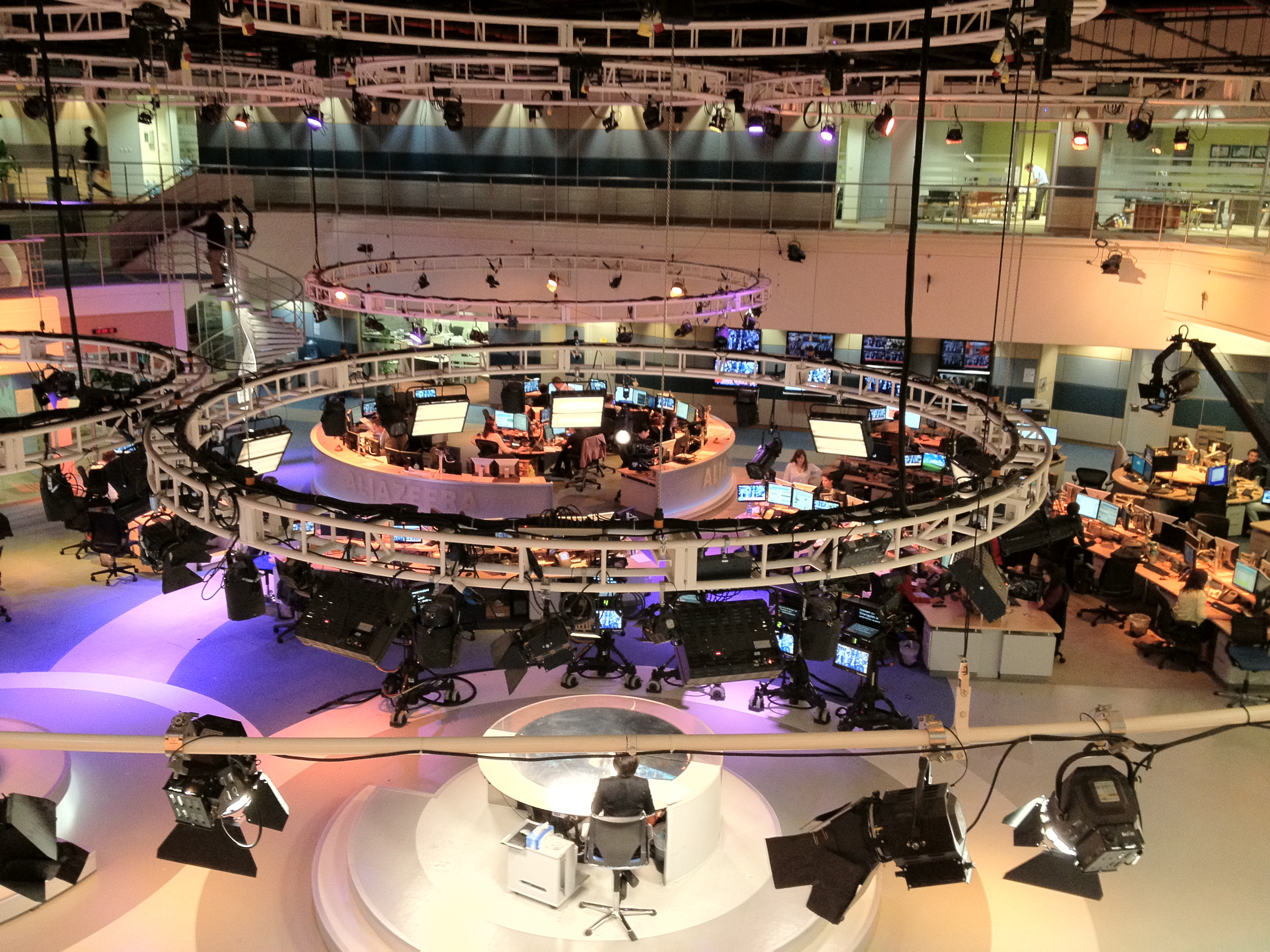
Al Jazeera English Newsroom

The channel launched on 15 November 2006 with an investment of approximately $1 billion from the Qatari government. Initially slated to be named Al Jazeera International, the channel was renamed nine months prior to the launch. This decision was influenced by one of the channel's backers, who argued that the original Arabic-language channel already encompassed an international scope.

The channel was expected to reach approximately 40 million households, but it significantly surpassed this launch target, reaching 80 million homes. By 2009, the service was accessible in every major European market and available to 130 million homes across more than 100 countries through cable and satellite, according to a network spokeswoman in Washington.

However, the channel had limited penetration in the American market, where it was carried by only one satellite service and a handful of cable networks. Al Jazeera English subsequently launched a campaign to enter the North American market, including a dedicated website. In August 2011, it became available to some cable subscribers in New York, having previously been an option for some viewers in Washington, D.C., Ohio, and Los Angeles. The channel primarily reached the United States through its live online streaming service. Following approval from the Canadian Radio-television and Telecommunications Commission on 26 November 2009, Al Jazeera English became readily available on most major Canadian television providers, including Rogers and Bell Satellite TV.

Al Jazeera English and Iran's state-run Press TV were the only international English-language television broadcasters with journalists reporting from inside both Gaza and Israel during the 2008–2009 Israel-Gaza conflict. Foreign press access to Gaza was limited via either Egypt or Israel. However, Al Jazeera's reporters Ayman Mohyeldin and Sherine Tadros were already inside Gaza when the conflict began.

The channel is also available online. The network encourages online viewing at its own website or via its channel on YouTube. Al Jazeera English HD launched in the United Kingdom on Freeview on 26 November 2013, and began streaming in HD on YouTube in 2015.

On 1 January 2020, Al Jazeera English debuted a new graphics package to coincide with the renovation of its main Doha studio, the last of the channel's three main studios (Doha, London, and Washington D.C.) to be upgraded since the channel's launch in 2006.

=== Al Jazeera America ===
On 3 January 2013, Al Jazeera Media Network announced that it had purchased Current TV in the United States and would launch an American news channel. Sixty percent of the channel's programming would be produced in the United States, while 40% would be from Al Jazeera English. This was later changed at the request of pay-television providers to almost 100% US programming. However, Al Jazeera America maintained a close working relationship with Al Jazeera English. The channel aired Newshour in the morning and midday hours, and cut to live Al Jazeera English coverage of large breaking international news stories outside those hours. The Al Jazeera English programmes Witness, Earthrise, The Listening Post, Talk To Al Jazeera, Al Jazeera Correspondent and 101 East along with Al Jazeera Investigates aired regularly on Al Jazeera America.

On 13 January 2016, Al Jazeera America announced that the network would shut down on 12 April 2016, citing the "economic landscape".

=== Al Jazeera UK ===
In 2013, Al Jazeera Media Network began planning a new channel called Al Jazeera UK; the British channel was set to broadcast for five hours during prime time as a local opt-out of Al Jazeera English. Ultimately, the planned UK channel never materialised. Al Jazeera English continued to broadcast some of its daily bulletins from London until July 2023, when it moved its base to Qatar.

== Availability ==
The channel is available in many countries, mostly via satellite, sometimes via cable. The channel is also available online. Al Jazeera English provides a free HD stream on its website for unlimited viewing. Al Jazeera news segments were frequently included on the American public television program Worldfocus which aired from 6 October 2008 until 2 April 2010. Al Jazeera can also be streamed on any iOS or Android device with an internet connection using a free application.

Al Jazeera English is also available on connected TV and OTT streaming services like Pluto TV and Haystack News.

Along with a free unlimited high-quality stream on the official Al Jazeera English website, Online subscriptions allowing unlimited viewing may be purchased from Jump TV, RealPlayer, and VDC. Headlines from Al Jazeera English are available on Twitter.

Al Jazeera English's website also contains news reports and full episodes of their programs that can be viewed for free on their website. The videos are hosted by YouTube, where viewers can also go to find the videos.

=== Europe ===
Al Jazeera English is available in the UK and Ireland on Freeview channel 235, Sky channel 511, Freesat channel 203 and Virgin Media channel 622. A notice appearing on Freeview channel 235 indicates that Al Jazeera is scheduled to end there on 30 September 2024 but that its service will remain on channel 251 as a streaming service for STBs that support streaming.

The channel initially began test streaming Al Jazeera English (then called "Al Jazeera International") in March 2006 on Hot Bird, Astra 1E, Hispasat, AsiaSat3S, Eutelsat 28A and Panamsat PAS 10. Telenors Thor, Türksat and Eutelsat 25A were added to the satellites carrying it. Eutelsat 28A carried the test stream on frequency 11.681 under the name "AJI".

=== Africa ===
Al Jazeera English is available in Sub-Saharan Africa mainly via DStv and StarTimes' satellite and terrestrial TV platforms. It is also available FTA on satellites like Belintersat 51.5°E and Nilesat 201. In Northern Africa, Al Jazeera English is available on telcos like Etisalat. It is also available via satellite, on Badr°26E and various local cable operators.

=== Oceania ===
In New Zealand, Al Jazeera English is available 24 hours a day on Freeview (New Zealand) channel 16 and Sky (New Zealand) channel 90. From October 2013, Freeview (New Zealand) broadcast on the Kordia operated free-to-air DVB-T terrestrial network. Prior to the December 2012 analog switchoff Triangle TV re-broadcast various Al Jazeera programmes in Auckland on its free-to-air UHF channel. TV One was going to replace BBC World News with this service during their off-air hours of 01:30 to 06:00 from 1 April 2013, however opted to run infomercials instead.

=== Asia ===
In April 2010, Al Jazeera English was taken off air in Singapore Singtel TV with unspecified reasons, according to the official Al Jazeera English website.

On 7 December 2010, Al Jazeera said its English language service has got a downlink license to broadcast in India. Satellite and cable companies would therefore be allowed to broadcast Al Jazeera in the country. The channel launched on Dish TV in November 2011, and is considering a Hindi-language channel. Tata Play satellite service broadcasts this on Channel 637 (SD) in India.

=== Americas ===
On 26 November 2009, the Canadian Radio-television and Telecommunications Commission approved "a request to add Al Jazeera English (AJE) to the lists of eligible satellite services for distribution on a digital basis and amends the lists of eligible satellite services accordingly". Al Jazeera English became available on Rogers Cable, Videotron and Bell Satellite TV on 4 May 2010.

Al Jazeera English's coverage of the Egyptian Revolution of 2011 led to calls for the channel to be aired in the U.S.

Al Jazeera English is available via satellite across all of North America free to air via Globecast on Galaxy 19 on the Ku band in DVB format. As of 2011, only a small number of Americans were able to watch the channel on their televisions. Among the markets where it was available were Bristol County, Rhode Island, Toledo and Sandusky, Ohio, Burlington, Vermont, Houston, Texas, and Washington, DC. Industry giant Comcast originally planned to carry Al Jazeera English in 2007, but reversed its decision shortly before the channel's launch, citing "the already-saturated television market". The two major American satellite providers, DirecTV and Dish Network, had similar plans but also changed their minds, with speculation that the decision may have been influenced by allegations by the Bush administration of "anti-American bias" on the channel.

With Al Jazeera's coverage of the Egyptian Revolution of 2011, the channel drew acclaim and received renewed attention. The New York Times reported on 1 February 2011 that 1.6 million U.S. viewers had tuned in via Internet stream, and stated that new discussions were underway with carriers. The following month, it was announced that Al Jazeera entered carriage negotiations with Comcast and Time Warner Cable. Salon.com described the channel's English-language coverage as "mandatory viewing for anyone interested in the world-changing events currently happening in Egypt", while Huffington Post contributor Jeff Jarvis claimed it was "un-American" for operators to not carry the network. When Al Jazeera covered the Libyan Civil War, U.S. Secretary of State Hillary Clinton noted an increasing American audience for the network, saying that "viewership of Al Jazeera is going up in the United States because it's real news. You may not agree with it, but you feel like you're getting real news around the clock instead of a million commercials and—you know—arguments between talking heads and the kind of stuff that we do on our news which—you know—is not particularly informative to us, let alone foreigners."

On 1 February 2011, Internet appliance Roku posted on its Facebook page that the English-language Al Jazeera Live would be streaming on Roku devices through a private channel called Newscaster and also through the BBC channel. It permitted the announcement following unrest in Egypt so American viewers can watch the latest events going on in the Middle East. A Roku user must add the private channel Newscaster from the Roku website.

On 1 August 2011, Al Jazeera English began airing 23 hours a day in New York City as part of a sublet agreement with cable channel RISE, a former Spanish-language network, which is carried on WRNN-TV's DT2 subchannel (the other hours were used to meet FCC E/I and local programming guidelines). The network aired on Time Warner Cable on channel 92 and on Verizon FiOS on channel 481.

On 2 January 2013, Al Jazeera announced that it had acquired the U.S.-based cable TV channel Current TV for a reported $500 million. With this acquisition, Al Jazeera launched a new channel, called Al Jazeera America, with a heavy dose of U.S. domestic news along with Al Jazeera English programming and news, to an estimated 40 million U.S. households—putting it in direct competition with CNN, MSNBC and Fox News Channel.

Due to contracts with U.S. cable and satellite carriers for Al Jazeera America the official Al Jazeera English live stream was geo-blocked in the United States on 18 August 2013. With the launch of Al Jazeera America, Al Jazeera English was excluded from all US services carrying or providing the channel, including YouTube, with Al Jazeera America material replacing all Al Jazeera English video content and live streams. Most Al Jazeera English video content was no longer officially available in the United States.

In April 2014 the Al Jazeera English show Empire was not geo-blocked in the United States. Shortly after the programs Indian Hospital, Viewfinder, Lifelines: The Quest for Global Health and Head to Head were available also. These programs were the only AJE shows officially non-geoblocked for American viewing during the time that Al Jazeera America was in existence.

With the closure of Al Jazeera America in April 2016 it was expected that the official live stream of Al Jazeera English and access to its programmes would eventually be restored to the United States. The online live stream of Al Jazeera English was made available to viewers in the United States once again in September 2016.

== Website ==
Shortly after launching in 2003, Al Jazeera's English website was hit by hackers who launched denial-of-service attacks. Aljazeera.com has served as the primary web address for both the Al Jazeera English and former Al Jazeera America websites since early 2011. The domain name was acquired by Al Jazeera Media Network from Aljazeera Publishing, a Dubai-based media company which previously used the domain as the website for their unrelated publication Aljazeera Magazine. This followed after a long-running domain name dispute between the two entities, which included a failed 2005 attempt by Al Jazeera Network to take control of the domain. Confusion between the two entities resulted in some articles from Al Jazeera magazine being erroneously attributed to the Al Jazeera Network.

In 2012, 40 percent of the 150 million visits Al Jazeera English's website received originated from the United States.

== Al Jazeera Investigative Unit ==
The Al Jazeera Investigative Unit is a specialized investigative journalism team within Al Jazeera. The unit is known for producing investigative reports and documentaries on a wide range of global issues, including politics, human rights, corruption, environmental issues, and more. The documentaries are featured as exclusive specials within their dedicated series Al Jazeera Investigates.

Some of the I-Unit's notable investigations include:

- What Killed Arafat? Al Jazeera's Investigative Unit released a documentary in 2012 titled What Killed Arafat?. This investigative piece delved into the mysterious death of Yasser Arafat, the Palestinian leader, who died in 2004 at the age of 75. The documentary suggested that he may have been poisoned with polonium-210. Yasser Arafat died in 2004, and the exact cause of his death had been a subject of controversy and speculation for years. This film earned the CINE Golden Eagle and nominations for RTS, BAFTA, and Monte Carlo Film Festival.
- How to Sell a Massacre is a documentary produced by the Al Jazeera Investigative Unit. It is an investigative report that exposed efforts by the National Rifle Association of America to influence Australian politics and undermine gun control regulations in Australia. The documentary was released in 2019.
- Generation Hate is a two-part investigative documentary by Al Jazeera's Investigative Unit that exposes the activities of the far-right group Generation Identity in France. The documentary reveals that GI members are carrying out racist attacks, making Nazi salutes, and calling for the expulsion of Muslims from Europe.
- Football's Wall of Silence is an investigative documentary by Al Jazeera Investigations about allegations of sexual abuse involving youth footballers and coaches in the British football system. The film reports on cases of abuse and presents testimony from former players, as well as examining institutional responses within the sport..
- Broken Dreams - The Boeing 787, is an investigative documentary produced by Al Jazeera's Investigative Unit that examines the troubled development and production of the Boeing 787 Dreamliner, a wide-body commercial jetliner. The film reports allegations of on-the-job drug use, quality control problems, and poor workmanship among Boeing employees, and it raises concerns about the safety of the aircraft.
- The Labour Files is a documentary series by Al Jazeera’s Investigative Unit based on a large leak of internal documents, emails, and messages from the British Labour Party. The investigation reports that some Jeremy Corbyn supporters were falsely accused of homophobia and antisemitism in submissions to the party’s Governance and Legal Unit, and describes these actions as part of what the programme characterises as a "coup by stealth" against Corbyn. The series examines the party’s handling of antisemitism allegations and internal political disputes.

== Awards ==
As of May 2017, Al Jazeera English has won more than 150 prizes, medals and awards, with notable accolades such as:

- 2022, 2023 Broadcaster of the Year at the New York Festival's TV & Film Awards
- Royal Television Society Award - 2021, 2022
- Agence France-Presse's Kate Webb Prize to correspondent Asad Hashim in 2018 for a series of articles on the plight of ethnic Pashtuns and blasphemy issues in Pakistan.
- The Peabody Awards
  - 2011 - Al Jazeera English coverage of the Arab Awakening
  - 2017 - Peabody Award for Fatma Naib’s documentary ‘The Cut: Exploring FGM’, which explores the dangerous and painful practice of female genital mutilation (FGM) in many countries around the world.

== Programmes ==
- 101 East
- Al Jazeera Investigations
- Empire
- Fault Lines
- Inside Story
- The Listening Post
- Newshour
- People & Power
- TechKnow
- The Stream
- Witness
- UpFront
- The Café
- The Fabulous Picture Show

== Reception ==
=== Detention of Al Jazeera journalists by Egypt ===
On 29 December 2013, Egyptian security forces arrested three Al Jazeera English journalists—Australian Peter Greste, Canadian Mohamed Fahmy, and Egyptian Baher Mohamed—at Cairo's Marriott Hotel, accusing them of reporting news damaging to national security. Despite international outcry and campaigns like #FreeAJStaff, calls for their release from the UN, EU, and the US went unheeded. The journalists faced a series of trial delays, with questionable evidence, including misleading videos, inaudible audio recordings, and unrelated images.

On 23 June 2014, Greste and Fahmy received seven-year sentences, while Mohamed was sentenced to 10 years. The verdict was widely criticized, with global leaders and media outlets denouncing it as a politically motivated attack on press freedom. Calls for amnesty were rebuffed by Egypt, asserting the independence of its justice system. Amid mounting pressure, Greste was released and deported to Australia on 1 February 2015.

On 29 August 2015, the trio faced an additional three-year sentence, sparking international condemnation. The Canadian government sought Fahmy's pardon and deportation, which was granted on 23 September 2015, alongside a pardon for Mohamed, as part of a larger pardon by Egyptian President el-Sisi for 100 individuals. The case underscored concerns about press freedom and raised calls for reevaluating foreign aid to Egypt.

=== Expulsion from China ===
In 2012, Melissa Chan, who served as the longstanding China correspondent for Al Jazeera English, faced expulsion from the country. Although the Chinese government refrained from publicly disclosing the reasons for her expulsion, it was widely understood that their dissatisfaction stemmed from a documentary aired by the channel that focused on China's prison system. The incident prompted inquiries during the Beijing press corps' routine questioning at the Chinese Foreign Ministry's daily press briefing on 8 May 2012. However, officials provided no explanation and selectively omitted most related questions when publishing the official transcript. Following her expulsion, Melissa Chan continued her journalistic career at Al Jazeera America.

=== Allegations of anti-American bias ===
Emmy Award-winning journalist Dave Marash resigned from his position in March 2008, saying his exit was due in part to an anti-American bias at the network, which is little seen in the US. Marash said he felt that attitude more from British administrators than Arabs. He said there were other reasons for his exit and was proud of the network's coverage of issues south of the equator, but that he ultimately felt that it was not the right place for him. Marash had also described Al Jazeera as "the best news channel on Earth."

On 12 October 2008, Al Jazeera English broadcast interviews with people attending a Sarah Palin United States presidential election rally in St. Clairsville, Ohio, with interviewees making comments about Barack Obama such as "he regards white people as trash" and "I'm afraid if he wins, the blacks will take over"...The report received over two million views on YouTube. Following this, The Washington Post ran an op-ed, claiming the news channel was deliberately encouraging "anti-American sentiment overseas", which was criticized by Al Jazeera as "a gratuitous and uninformed shot at Al Jazeera's motives", as the report was just one of "hundreds of hours of diverse coverage". Al-Jazeera, once viewed skeptically in the U.S., received broad praise for its Egypt coverage, which boosted its American audience and renewed calls for its inclusion on U.S. cable networks.

Additional programming geared towards an American audience includes a day's worth of special coverage marking the 10th anniversary of the terrorist attacks of 11 September 2001. Al Jazeera has also launched The Stream, a show based in Washington D.C. that discusses social media, which targets an American audience. On 2 January 2013, Al Jazeera purchased the American channel Current TV and rebranded as Al Jazeera America in August 2013.

=== Employment freeze ===
In mid 2014, Al Jazeera English froze employment of both permanent and freelance staff for its Qatar network and cut freelance pay rates by 30-40% without warning, while at the same time Al Jazeera lodged a $150 million claim for compensation against Egypt, arguing that by arresting and attacking Al Jazeera journalists, seizing the broadcaster's property and jamming its signal, the Egyptian government has violated its rights as a foreign investor in the country and put the $90 million it has invested in Egypt since 2001 at risk.

== See also ==
- Al Jazeera effect
- Al Jazeera Arabic
- Al Jazeera Balkans
- AJ+
- Al Jazeera Media Network
