= British Academy Television Craft Award for Best Titles & Graphic Identity =

Award for technical achievements in TV

British Academy Television Craft Award
- Country: United Kingdom
- Presented by: British Academy of Film and Television Arts
- First award: 1978
- Currently held by: Nicos Livesey, Bart Yates, Rebecca Little, Aron Sidhu, Steven Lownes & Phil Bigwood for UEFA Women's Euro 2025 (2026)
- Website: http://www.bafta.org/

The British Academy Television Craft Award for Best Titles & Graphic Identity is one of the categories presented by the British Academy of Film and Television Arts (BAFTA) within the British Academy Television Craft Awards, the craft awards were established in 2000 with their own, separate ceremony as a way to spotlight technical achievements, without being overshadowed by the main production categories. According to the BAFTA website, this category is "to recognise originality and excellence within the title sequence and graphic identity of a programme.", also stating that "the same title sequence may not be entered more than once. The same programme may be entered in consecutive years, but only if it has new titles."

The category was gone through some name changes since its creation:

- From 1978 to 1993 it was presented as Best Graphics.
- From 1994 to 2000 and then from 2003 to 2005 it was presented as Best Graphic Design.
- In 2001, 2002 and 2013 it was awarded with the Best Special, Visual & Graphic Effects category under the name Best Visual Effects and Graphic Design.
- From 2006 to 2015 it was presented as Best Titles, with the exception of 2011, 2012 and 2014 where it was not awarded.
- Since 2016, the category is presented as Best Titles and Graphic Identity.

== Winners and nominees ==
=== 1970s ===
Best Graphics

Year	Title	Recipient(s)
1978	Omnibus: For Art or Money	Bob Blagden
1978	Yorkshire Television Play Titles; Something to Declare: Robert Kee	Diana Dunn
1978	Aquarius: Mr Satie Passes Through	Pat Gavin
1978	Secret Army	Alan Jeapes
1978	Rock Follies of '77	Rob Page
1978	Raven	Geoff Pearson
1979	Omnibus	Bob Blagden
1979	The South Bank Show	Pat Gavin
1979	Two's Company	Pat Gavin, Terry Griffiths
1979	Read All About It	Ian Moo-Young

=== 1980s ===
Best Graphics

Year	Title	Recipient(s)
1980	Secret Army	Alan Jeapes
1980	Tinker Tailor Soldier Spy	Doug Burd
1980	The South Bank Show	Pat Gavin
1980	Shoestring	Sid Sutton
1981	The South Bank Show; Blade on the Feather; 20th Century Box	Pat Gavin
1981	The Merchant of Venice	Alan Jeapes
1981	Hollywood	Barry O'Reardon
1981	Flickers	George Wallder
1982	The Hitchhiker's Guide to the Galaxy	Rod Lord
1982	Winston Churchill: The Wilderness Years	Arthur Butten
1982	The South Bank Show	Pat Gavin
1982	A Fine Romance	Tony Oldfield
1983	Jane; Gulliver in Lilliput	Graham McCallum
1983	Smiley's People; Barchester Chronicles	Stewart Austin
1983	The Snowman	Dianne Jackson, Raymond Briggs
1983	Whoops Apocalypse; The South Bank Show	Pat Gavin
1984	Hey, Good Looking! The South Bank Show	Pat Gavin
1984	Unknown Chaplin; Saigon, Year of the Cat	Barry O’Riordan
1984	The Tale of Beatrix Potter	Anne Smith
1984	Film on Four (Opening Titles)	Sid Sutton
1985	Jane in the Desert	John Kennedy, Graham McCallum
1985	The Box of Delights	Stewart Austin
1985	Bird of Prey II	Bob Cosford
1985	The South Bank Show	Pat Gavin
1986	Max Headroom (Pilot)	Rod Lord, Peter Tupy
1986	Marilyn Monroe: Say Goodbye to the President	Joanna Ball
1986	Edge of Darkness	Andy Coward, Linda Sherwood-Page
1986	John Lennon: A Journey in the Life	Peter Wane
1987	The Singing Detective	Joanna Ball
1987	Lost Empires	Ray Freeman
1987	The Entertainers	Pat Gavin
1987	The Life and Loves of a She-Devil	Michael Graham-Smith
1987	Film on Four	Marc Ortmans
1987	Entertainment USA	John Salisbury
1988	Tutti Frutti	Sandi Anderson, John Byrne
1988	Porterhouse Blue	Phil Austin, Derek Hayes
1988	The South Bank Show	Pat Gavin
1988	The RKO Story: Tales from Hollywood	Peter Wane
1989	Wired	Matt Forrest
1989	Thompson	Andy Frith
1989	The South Bank Show	Pat Gavin
1989	Talking Heads	Mina Martinez
1989	Network 7	Shelley O’Neil, Matt Forrest, Damian Wayling

=== 1990s ===
Best Graphics

Year	Title	Recipient(s)	Broadcaster
1990	Agatha Christie's Poirot	Pat Gavin	ITV
1990	Around The World in 80 Days	Liz Friedman	BBC One
1990	The Late Show	Steve Bonnet, Jane Fielder, Keith Haynes, Mina Martinez	BBC Two
1990	DEF II	Jane Wyatt	BBC Two
1991	Summer on BBC1 (Promotion)	Lucy Blakstad, Susan Worthy	BBC One
1991	Rough Guide to the World	Andy Frith	BBC One
1991	The Clothes Show	Elizabeth Edwards	BBC One
1991	Tonight with Jonathan Ross	Danielle Frick	Channel 4
1992	The Crystal Maze	Darren Agnew	Channel 4
1992	The Clothes Show	Elizabeth Edwards	BBC One
1992	BBC Network Identities	Martin Lambie-Nairn, Daniel Barber	BBC
1992	G.B.H.	Debby Mendoza	Channel 4
1993	Jeeves and Wooster	Derek Hayes	ITV
1993	Going Live!	Morgan Almeida, Mark Knight, Paul Baguley	BBC One
1993	The South Bank Show (Titles)	Pat Gavin	ITV
1993	BBC2 Channel Identities	Brendan Norman-Ross, Sue Worthy, Maylin Lee	BBC Two

Best Graphic Design

Year	Title	Recipient(s)	Broadcaster
1994	Christmas on BBC2	Jane Fielder, Iain Greenway	BBC Two
1994	Morph and Griff	Simon Winchester, Paul Weiland, Sue Worthy	BBC
1994	Autumn on BBC2	Jane Wyatt, Maylin Lee, Iain Greenway	BBC Two
1994	Winter on BBC2	Jane Wyatt, Mark Chaudoir, Tim Platt	BBC Two
1995	The Day Today	Richard Norley, Russell Hilliard	BBC Two
1995	1994 Channel 4 On-Air Promotions	Glenn Carwithen	Channel 4
1995	Winter on BBC2 1994/95	Iain Greenway, Tim Platt	BBC Two
1995	Autumn on BBC2 1994	Bill Wilson, Jane Fielder	BBC Two
1996	BBC2 Christmas Animations	Iain Greenway, Jane Wyatt	BBC Two
1996	BBC1 Winter Animations	Mark Chaudoir, Paula Williams	BBC One
1996	Have I Got News for You	Tim Searle	BBC Two
1996	American Football: Blitz	Susan Young Limited	Sky Sports
1997	Channel 4 Stings for Children's Channel 4	Luis Cook, Helen Nabarro	Channel 4
1997	People's Century	Iain Macdonald, Alan Jeapes	BBC One
1997	Secret History Titles	John Kennedy	Channel 4
1997	Trail for National Poetry Day	Charlie Mawer, Ahmet Ahmet	BBC
1998	Election 97	Michael Afford, Ceri Kashita	BBC
1998	The South Bank Show	Pat Gavin	ITV
1998	The Nazis: A Warning from History	John Kennedy	BBC Two
1998	People's Century	Ian Wormleighton	BBC One
1999	The Human Body	Tim Goodchild, David Haith	BBC One
1999	World Cup 98	Steven Aspinall	BBC One/ITV
1999	Body Story	Chris Hart	Channel 4
1999	Eurotrash	Tim Varlow	Channel 4

=== 2000s ===
Best Graphic Design

Year	Title	Recipient(s)	Broadcaster
2000	The Vice	Philip Dupee	ITV
2000	2000 Today	Liz Friedman, Kevin Hill	BBC
2000	Eye of the Storm	Peter Phillips	ITV
2000	Cold Feet	Peter Terry, Matt Howarth, Susan Voudouris	ITV
2001	Awarded as Best Visual Effects and Graphic Design		
2002	Awarded as Best Visual Effects and Graphic Design		
2003	The Dinosaur Hunters	Burrell Durrant Hifle	
2003	Great Britons	Burrell Durrant Hifle	BBC
2003	Banzai Jubilee Special	Blue Source	E4
2003	The Life of Mammals	Mick Connaire, Andrew Power, David Corfield	BBC One
2004	Restoration	Tim Varlow	BBC Two
2004	Film 2003	Tim Varlow	BBC One
2004	Cambridge Spies	Christine Buttner	BBC Two
2004	Natural World	David Freeman, Will Skinner	BBC Two
2005	The Long Firm	Ray Leek	BBC Two
2005	British Isles: A Natural History	David Corfield	BBC One
2005	Spooks	Mark Doman	BBC One
2005	Athens Olympics 2004 (Title Sequence)	Paul Mitchell, Louise Braham, Katy Jones	BBC One

Best Titles

Year	Title	Recipient(s)	Broadcaster
2006	Life in the Undergrowth	Mick Connaire	BBC One
2006	Jamie's School Dinners	Matt Utber	Channel 4
2006	Hustle	Berger and Wyse	BBC One
2006	Rome	Angus Wall	BBC Two
2007	Match of the Day: FIFA World Cup 2006	Mark Walters, Chris Grubb, Louise Braham	BBC Two
2007	Hotel Babylon	Richard Norley, Russell Mann	BBC One
2007	Suburban Shootout	Alan O'Brien, Anthony Scott, Lynn Nealon	Channel 5
2007	England One Day Internationals	Christopher Wilcock, Richard Vowles, Andrew Paraskos	BBC
2008	Skins	Tal Rosner	E4
2008	Primeval	Peter Anderson	ITV
2008	Life on Mars	Why Not Associates	BBC One
2008	Rugby Union	Adam Wells, Christopher Wilcock, Mark Hyde	BBC Sport
2009	Olympics 2008	Sport Team	BBC One
2009	Football League	Adam Wells, Jason Landau, Mark Blackwood	Sky Sports
2009	No.1 Ladies' Detective Agency	Airside	BBC One
2009	Wallander	Title Film And Television	BBC One

=== 2010s ===
Best Titles

Year	Title	Recipient(s)	Broadcaster
2010	BBC Winter Olympics	Marc Craste, Damon Collins, Tim McNaughton, Freddy Mandy	BBC Two
2010	Misfits	Miki Kato, Nic Benns	E4
2010	Formula 1	Liquid TV	BBC Two/BBC Sport
2010	Cast Offs	Victor Martinez, Joel Wilson	Channel 4
2011	Not awarded		
2012	Not awarded		
2013	Awarded as Best Visual Effects and Graphic Design		
2014	Not awarded		
2015	Winter Olympics 2014	Mark Roalfe, Tomek Baginski, Ron Chakraborty	BBC
2015	Da Vinci's Demons	Paul McDonnell, Hugo Moss, Nathan Mckenna	Fox
2015	Penny Dreadful	Erik Friedman, Rudy Jaimes, Ray Burris	Sky Atlantic
2015	Ripper Street	Nic Benns, Miki Kato, Jim Fisher	BBC One

Best Titles & Graphic Identity

Year	Title	Recipient(s)	Broadcaster
2016	Fortitude	MOMOCO	Sky Atlantic
2016	Murder in Successville	Edward Tracy	BBC Three
2016	Luther	Nic Benns, Miki Kato	BBC One
2016	The Last Kingdom	Paul McDonnell, Ben Hanbury, Hugo Moss	BBC Two
2017	Paralympics 2016	Richard Norley, Lee Jacobs, Callum O'Reilly	Channel 4
2017	The Durrells	Alex Maclean	ITV
2017	The Crown	Patrick Clair, Raoul Marks	Netflix
2017	The Night Manager	Patrick Clair, Raoul Marks	BBC One
2018	SS-GB	William Bartlett	BBC One
2018	Top of the Lake: China Girl	Morgan Beringer	BBC Two
2018	Blue Planet II	BDH Creative	BBC One
2018	Have I Got News for You	Liquid TV	BBC One
2019	"The Fearless Are Here" – The 2018 Winter Olympics	Smith & Foulkes, Mark Roalfe	BBC One
2019	Take Your Pills	Allison Brownmoore, Anthony Brownmoore, Joe Nowacki	Netflix
2019	Killing Eve	Matt Willey	BBC One
2019	Black Earth Rising	Steve Small, Kristian Andrews, Nikki Kefford-White	BBC Two

=== 2020s ===
Year	Title	Recipient(s)	Broadcaster
2020	His Dark Materials	Elastic, Painting Practice	BBC One
2020	The Durrells	Alex Maclean	ITV
2020	Catherine the Great	Elastic	Sky Atlantic
2020	Ghosts	Light Creative	BBC One
2021	Fear City: New York vs the Mafia	Nic Benns and Miki Kato	Netflix
2021	Devs	Matt Curtis	BBC Two
2021	Dracula	Peter Anderson Studio	BBC One
2021	Roald & Beatrix: The Tail of the Curious Mouse	Peter Anderson Studio	Sky One
2022	Tokyo 2020	Tim Jones, James Cross, Fantasista Utamaro, Ron Chakraborty, Kenji Kawai, Factory Fifteen	BBC One
2022	Lions Series: South Africa 2021	Ceri Sampson, Adam Wells, Steve Waugh	Sky Sports Action
2022	All Creatures Great and Small	Hello Yes, Gary Redford	Channel 5
2022	Around The World in 80 Days	Paul McDonnell, Hugo Moss, Ben Hanbury, Tamsin McGee	BBC One
2023	Bad Sisters	Peter Anderson Studio	Apple TV+
2023	Beijing 2022 Winter Olympics	Balázs Simon, BBC Creative, Gas Music	BBC Two
2023	The Essex Serpent	Yu+Co	Apple TV+
2023	Life After Life	Tom Hingston, Markus Lehtonen, Sam Norris	BBC One
2024	Wilderness	Paul McDonnell, Hugo Moss, Ben Hanbury, Tamsin McGee	Prime Video
2024	Doctor Who (for "Wild Blue Yonder")	Dan May, James Coore, Painting Practice, Realtime Visualisation	BBC One
2024	Good Omens	Peter Anderson Studio	Prime Video
2024	Queen Charlotte	Studio AKA	Netflix
2025	Sweetpea	Peter Anderson Studio	Sky Atlantic
2025	Ludwig	Paul McDonnell, Hugo Moss, Ben Hanbury, Tamsin McGee	BBC One
2025	Paris 2024 Olympics	FX Goby, Paul Bailey, Russell Hendrie, Nina Beyers, Tom Espezel	BBC One
2025	A Gentleman in Moscow	Matt Curtis	Paramount+
2026	UEFA Women's Euro 2025	Nicos Livesey, Bart Yates, Rebecca Little, Aron Sidhu, Steven Lownes, Phil Bigwood	BBC, ITV, S4C
2026	Code of Silence	Paul McDonnell, Hugo Moss, Ben Hanbury, Tamsin McGee	ITVX
2026	The Death of Bunny Munro	Isabella Eklöf, Luke Dunkley, Mike Holliday, Tony Kearns, Dean Wares	Sky Atlantic
2026	A Thousand Blows	Light Creative	Disney+

== See also ==
- Primetime Emmy Award for Outstanding Main Title Design
