= Norman Normal (disambiguation) =

Norman Normal may refer to:

== Cartoons ==
Norman Normal is a 1968 animated cartoon short.

- Norman Normal, a 1999 animated series with 19 episodes, produced by Tele Images Productions

== Music ==
- "Norman Normal", a 1966 song by Peter, Paul and Mary from The Peter, Paul and Mary Album
- "Norman Normal", a 1986 song by The Stranglers, B-side to "Always the Sun"

== Other ==
- Trebor Dandies: Norman Normal, an advert worked on by Ian Moo-Young
