= Peter Anderson Studio =

British graphic design and motion graphics studio

- Type: Private
- Industry: Graphic design; Motion graphics; Animation
- Founded: 2006; 20 years ago
- Founder: Peter Anderson
- Headquarters: Bermondsey, London, United Kingdom
- Website: www.peterandersonstudio.co.uk

Peter Anderson Studio is a British graphic design and motion graphics studio based in London. Founded in 2006 by designer Peter Anderson, it is known for creating title sequences for television drama series.

Its work has also been discussed in academic research on motion graphics and audience communication.

== History ==
The studio was founded in London in 2006 by Peter Anderson, developing a specialism in title sequences and broadcast graphics. Early television projects included title sequences for Oliver Twist (2007), Sherlock (2010) and The Fall (2013).

== Notable work ==
The studio's title sequence for Sherlock (2010–2017) used embedded text and visual effects to reflect the character's perspective, an approach that Art of the Title described as influential in the use of on-screen text as a storytelling device.

Its 2019 title sequence for Good Omens combined illustration, animation and live-action footage and was covered by Polygon. The sequence won the Indigo Design Award, two categories at the C2A Creative Communication Awards, and a Design Week Award in 2020.

For the BBC drama Dracula (2020), the studio created a title sequence that was nominated for a BAFTA Television Craft Award. The same year, its titles for Roald & Beatrix: The Tail of the Curious Mouse won the Royal Television Society Craft & Design Award for Design: Titles and were also BAFTA-nominated.

For the comedy series Bad Sisters (2022), the studio designed a title sequence built from a Rube Goldberg-style contraption using props from the show. It won the BAFTA Television Craft Award for Titles & Graphic Identity in 2023.

The studio's title sequence for Sweetpea (2024) won a BAFTA Television Craft Award in 2025. Good Omens season two (2023) was also BAFTA-nominated in the same category.

The studio has also produced title sequences for True Detective: Night Country (2024) and Margo's Got Money Troubles (2026).

== Other work ==
The studio has also designed visual identity systems for local government bodies, including A Thinking Place: The Wakefield District Toolkit for Wakefield Council, a design framework for historic industrial areas undergoing regeneration in West Yorkshire. The project has been discussed in academic literature on urban regeneration.

== Awards ==
Year	Award	Project	Result
2025	BAFTA Television Craft Award (Titles & Graphic Identity)	Sweetpea	Won
2024	BAFTA Television Craft Award (Titles & Graphic Identity)	Good Omens (Season 2)	Nominated
2023	BAFTA Television Craft Award (Titles & Graphic Identity)	Bad Sisters	Won
2021	Royal Television Society Craft & Design Award (Design: Titles)	Roald & Beatrix: The Tail of the Curious Mouse	Won
2021	BAFTA Television Craft Award (Titles & Graphic Identity)	Dracula	Nominated
2021	BAFTA Television Craft Award (Titles & Graphic Identity)	Roald & Beatrix: The Tail of the Curious Mouse	Nominated
2020	C2A Creative Communication Award (Animation)	Good Omens (Season 1)	Won (2 categories)
2020	Design Week Award (TV, Film and Video Graphics)	Good Omens (Season 1)	Won
2020	Indigo Design Award (Computer Animation and Main Title Design)	Good Omens (Season 1)	Won
