= Gavin Finney =

British cinematographer (born 1963)

- Born: 1963 (age 62–63); London, England
- Education: Manchester Polytechnic; National Film and Television School
- Occupation: Cinematographer
- Years active: 1990–present

Gavin Finney, B.S.C. (born 1963) is a British cinematographer. He joined the British Society of Cinematographers in 1998 and served as the organisation's president from 2006 to 2008.

At the 2013 British Academy Television Craft Awards, Finney won the British Academy of Film and Television Arts (BAFTA) Award for Best Photography & Lighting: Fiction for his work on the Channel 4 series The Fear (2012). He has also received award recognition from the British Society of Cinematographers, winning Best Cinematography in a Television Drama for his work on the BBC Two series Wolf Hall (2015) and earning nominations for his work on the Channel 4 serial The State (2017) and the Amazon Prime Video/BBC Two series Good Omens (2019–present).

== Selected filmography ==
=== Film ===
Year	Title	Notes	Ref(s)
2001	Harry Potter and the Philosopher's Stone	Second unit director of photography	
2003	Alex & Emma		
2005	Bailey's Billion$		
2005	Keeping Mum		
2006	These Foolish Things		
2007	St Trinian's		

=== Television ===
Year	Title	Notes	Ref(s)
2000	Gormenghast	4 episodes	
2005	Colditz	2 episodes	
2006	Terry Pratchett's Hogfather	2 episodes	
2008	Terry Pratchett's The Colour of Magic	2 episodes	
2009	Agatha Christie's Marple	Episode: "Why Didn't They Ask Evans?"	
2010	Terry Pratchett's Going Postal	2 episodes	
2012	Sinbad	12 episodes	
2012	The Fear	4 episodes	
2013	Mr Selfridge	2 episodes	
2013	The Guilty	3 episodes	
2015	Wolf Hall	6 episodes	
2017	The State	4 episodes	
2019–present	Good Omens	12 episodes	
