= The Fear (2012 TV series) =

British television drama series

- Genre: Crime drama
- Created by: Richard Cottan
- Directed by: Michael Samuels
- Starring: Peter Mullan; Harry Lloyd; Paul Nicholls; Anastasia Hille; Danny Sapani; Nigel Lindsay; Richard E. Grant
- Theme music composer: Dan Jones
- Country of origin: United Kingdom
- Original language: English
- No. of series: 1
- No. of episodes: 4

Production
- Executive producers: Richard Cottan; Simon Heath; Paul Stevens
- Producer: Tim Bricknell
- Cinematography: Gavin Finney
- Running time: 60 minutes
- Production companies: World Productions; BBC Worldwide

Original release
- Network: Channel 4
- Release: 3 December – 6 December 2012

The Fear is a four-part drama television series created by Richard Cottan, first broadcast on Channel 4 on 3 December 2012. The series, broadcast over four consecutive nights, stars Peter Mullan as Brighton-based criminal kingpin Richie Beckett, who finds himself waging war on an Albanian sex trafficking gang trying to muscle in on his turf, whilst dealing with the onset symptoms of dementia.

The Fear stars Harry Lloyd and Paul Nicholls as Richie's children, Matty and Cal, and Anastasia Hille as his wife, Jo. The series averaged an audience of 1.25 million viewers across its four-night run. The series' cinematography by Gavin Finney won the British Academy of Film and Television Arts (BAFTA) Award for Best Photography & Lighting: Fiction at the 2013 British Academy Television Craft Awards. The series has been released on DVD in Europe, but remains unreleased on home media in the UK.
