= Good Omens (TV series) =

Fantasy comedy TV series (2019–2026)

- Genre: Fantasy comedy
- Created by: Neil Gaiman
- Based on: Good Omens by: Terry Pratchett; Neil Gaiman
- Showrunner: Neil Gaiman
- Written by: Neil Gaiman; John Finnemore; Michael Marshall Smith; Peter Atkins
- Directed by: Douglas Mackinnon; Rachel Talalay
- Starring: Michael Sheen; David Tennant; Sam Taylor Buck; Jon Hamm
- Music by: David Arnold
- Countries of origin: United States; United Kingdom
- Original language: English
- No. of series: 3
- No. of episodes: 13

Production
- Executive producers: Neil Gaiman; Caroline Skinner; Chris Sussman; Rob Wilkins; Rod Brown; John Finnemore; Josh Cole; Douglas Mackinnon
- Cinematography: Gavin Finney
- Running time: 45–99 minutes
- Production companies: BBC Studios; Amazon Studios; Narrativia; The Blank Corporation

Original release
- Network: Amazon Prime Video
- Release: 31 May 2019 – 13 May 2026

Good Omens is a fantasy comedy television series created by Neil Gaiman based on his and Terry Pratchett's 1990 novel. A co-production between Amazon MGM Studios and BBC Studios, the series was directed by Douglas Mackinnon, with Gaiman also serving as showrunner. Michael Sheen and David Tennant lead a large ensemble cast that also includes Jon Hamm, Miranda Richardson, Michael McKean, Derek Jacobi, Brian Cox, Benedict Cumberbatch, and Frances McDormand as the voice of God, who narrates the series.

All episodes of the first series were released on Amazon Prime Video on 31 May 2019, and aired weekly on BBC Two in the UK between 15 January and 19 February 2020. Although the show's first series was conceived and marketed as a limited series, it was renewed for a second series in June 2021, which was later released on 28 July 2023. Good Omens was renewed for its third and final series in December 2023. After multiple sexual assault allegations against Gaiman, it was announced in October 2024 that Gaiman would be leaving the production and the third series would be reduced to a single 90-minute episode, which was released on 13 May 2026.

Like the novel, Good Omens features various Christian themes and figures and follows various characters all trying to either encourage or prevent an imminent Armageddon, seen through the eyes of the angel Aziraphale and the demon Crowley. Since its release, the series has been well received among critics, with praise for Sheen and Tennant's performances, faithfulness to its source material, and David Arnold's musical score, though the third series received a mixed response. Arnold earned himself two Primetime Emmy Awards nominations for Outstanding Music Composition and Original Main Title Theme.

== Premise ==
The first series follows the demon Crowley (David Tennant) and the angel Aziraphale (Michael Sheen), longtime acquaintances who have grown accustomed to each other's company, and to a pleasant life on Earth in the present day as representatives of Heaven and Hell, and who have agreed not to let the conflict between their sides prevent their friendship. When told that Armageddon is about to happen – the final battle between Heaven and Hell – they team up to prevent the coming of the Antichrist and the end of the pleasant existence they enjoy on Earth.

The second series concerns the Archangel Gabriel arriving without his memories to Aziraphale's bookshop. Aziraphale and Crowley attempt to find out what happened to Gabriel and to also hide him from Heaven and Hell, both of which are eager to find him.

== Cast and characters ==
=== Main ===
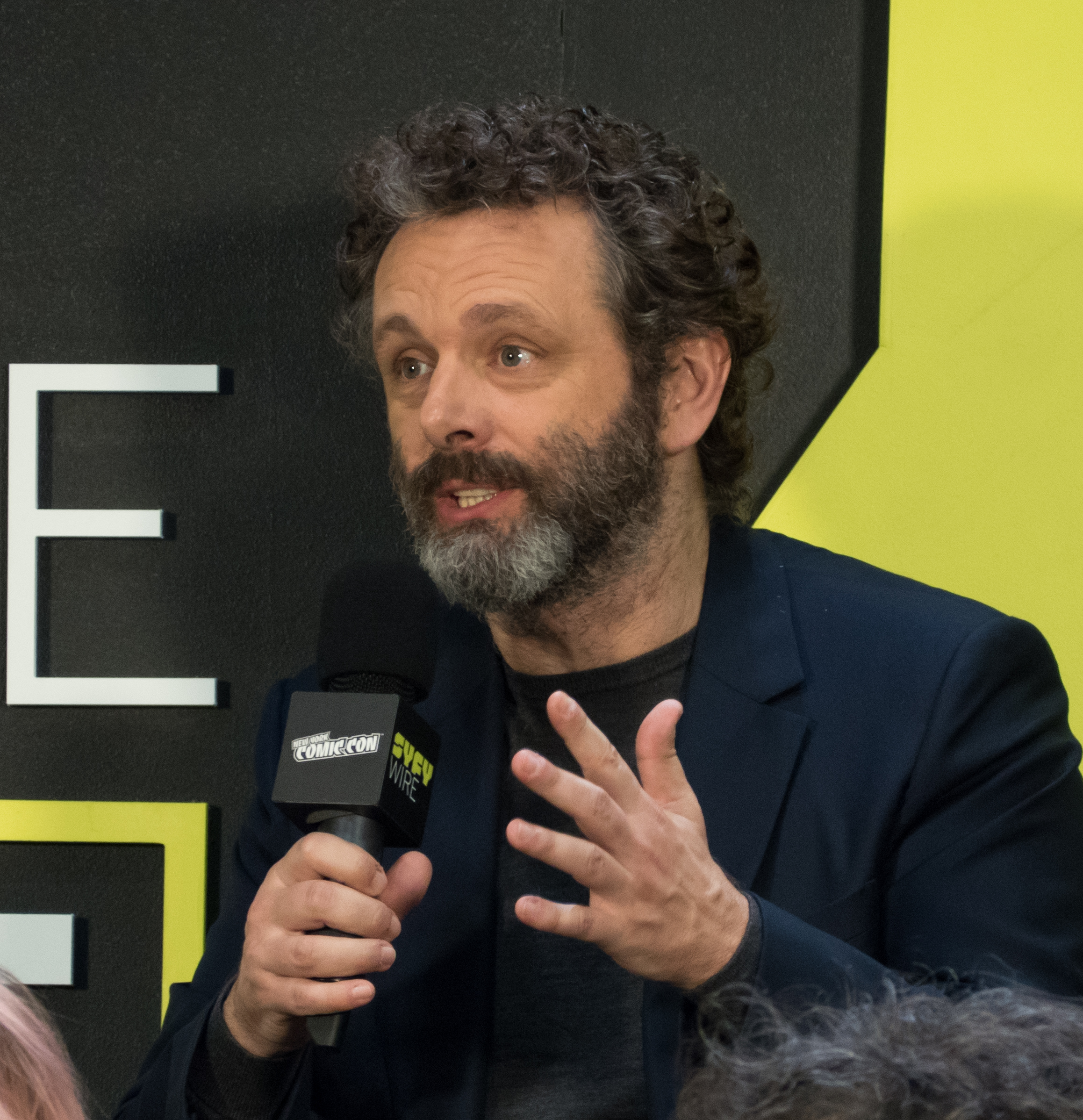
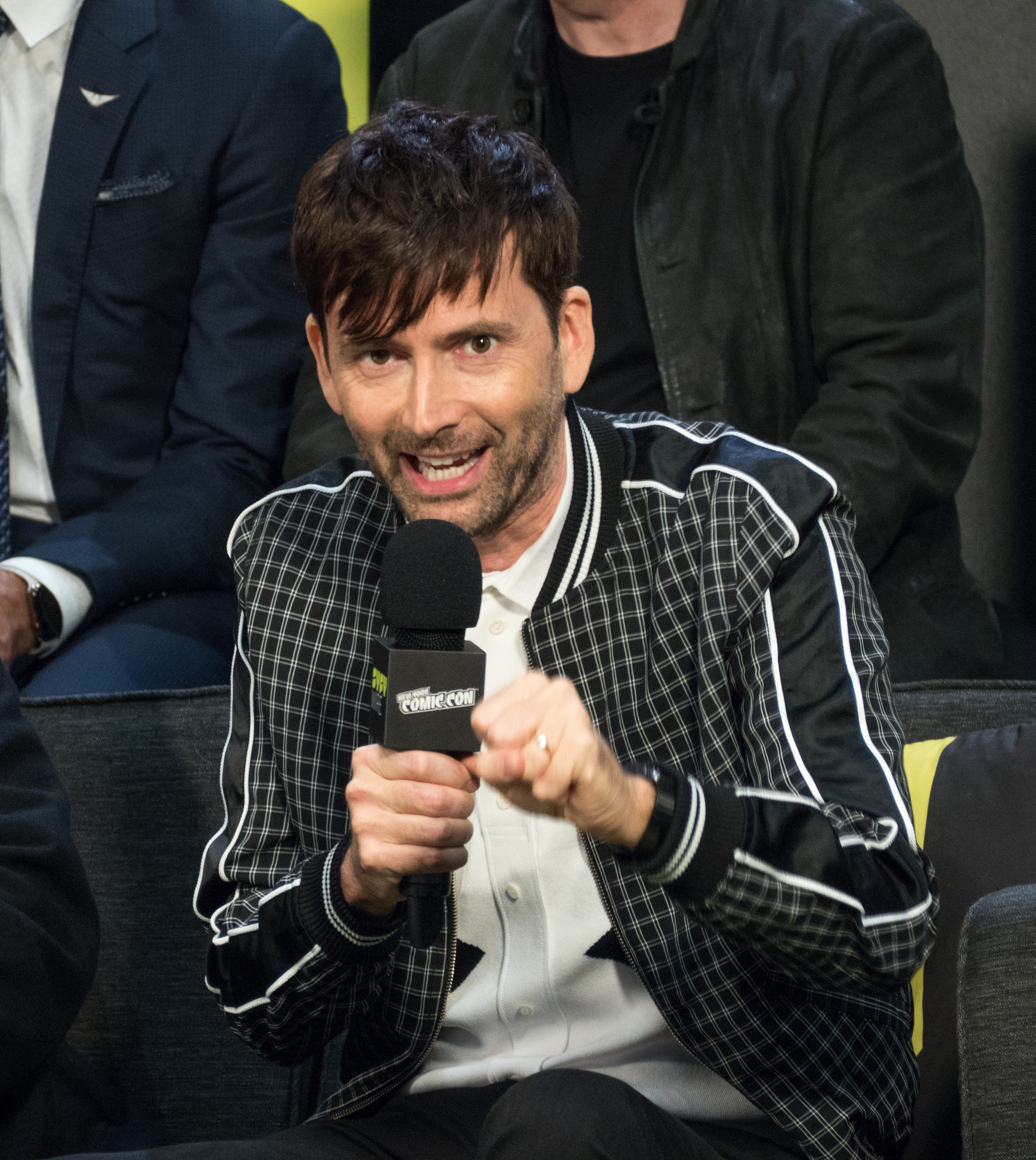
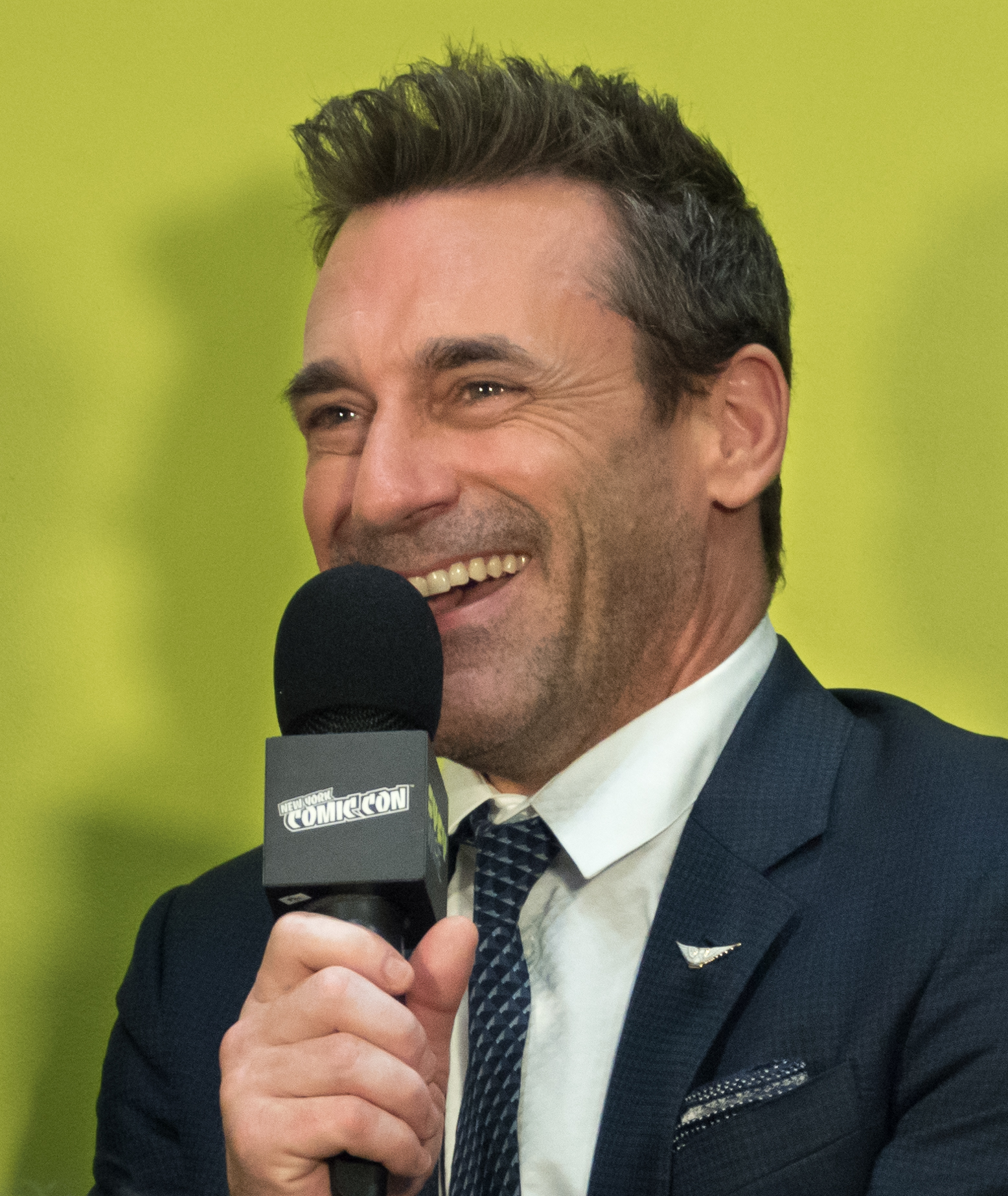
Good Omens stars (left to right) Michael Sheen, David Tennant, and Jon Hamm.

==== Starring ====
- Michael Sheen as Aziraphale, an angel who has lived on Earth since the dawn of creation. He guarded the East gate entrance to the Garden of Eden with a flaming sword, which he gave to Adam and Eve on their expulsion from the Garden out of concern for their well-being. He has grown to love the finer things of human life, enjoys haute cuisine and owns an antiquarian bookshop in London.
- David Tennant as Crowley, a demon who has lived on Earth since the dawn of creation. Originally called "Crawly", he is the Serpent who tempted Eve with the apple from the tree of knowledge of good and evil.
- Sam Taylor Buck as Adam Young (series 1; guest series 3), the reluctant Antichrist accidentally placed in the custody of the Young family.
- Jon Hamm as Gabriel (series 1–2), the leader of the forces of Heaven. While Gabriel was only mentioned once in the original novel, his role was meant to be expanded in the unfinished sequel to Good Omens; Gaiman incorporated parts of the planned sequel into the TV series's plot. In the novel, the leader of the forces of Heaven was the Metatron.

==== Recurring co-stars ====
- Daniel Mays as Arthur Young (series 1), father of Adam
- Siân Brooke as Deirdre Young (series 1), mother of Adam
- Ned Dennehy as Hastur (series 1), a demon
- Ariyon Bakare as Ligur (series 1), a demon
- Nick Offerman as Thaddeus Dowling (series 1), the US Ambassador to the UK and father of Warlock
- Anna Maxwell Martin (series 1) and Shelley Conn (series 2) as Beelzebub, the leader of the forces of Hell. Though portrayed by women, Gaiman has said the show's version of Beelzebub has no pronouns.
- Nina Sosanya as:
  - Sister Mary Loquacious (series 1), a nun of the Chattering Order of St. Beryl, a satanic order of nuns who had to switch a human baby with the Antichrist. After the convent burns down, she becomes manager of the business management centre established on the same site.
  - Nina (series 2), the owner of the coffee shop "Give Me Coffee or Give Me Death" which is across the street from Aziraphale's bookshop
- Maggie Service as:
  - Sister Theresa Garrulous (series 1), a nun of the Chattering Order of St. Beryl
  - Maggie (series 2), Aziraphale's tenant and a record shop owner
- Doon Mackichan as Michael, an archangel
- Frances McDormand (narrator, series 1; guest series 2) and Tanya Moodie (series 3) as God
- Adria Arjona as Anathema Device (series 1), Agnes Nutter's last descendant and an occultist who eventually teams up with Newton Pulsifer to try to stop the end of the world
- Miranda Richardson as:
  - Madame Tracy (series 1), a part-time medium and courtesan
  - Shax (series 2), a demon and confidante of Crowley's
- Michael McKean as Witchfinder Sergeant Shadwell (series 1), the last officer of the once-proud witchfinder army
- Jack Whitehall as:
  - Newton Pulsifer (series 1), a struggling computer engineer and descendant of witchfinder "Thou-Shalt-Not-Commit-Adultery" Pulsifer
  - "Thou-Shalt-Not-Commit-Adultery" Pulsifer (series 1), the witchfinder who burned Agnes Nutter at the stake
- Mireille Enos as War (series 1), one of the Four Horsemen of the Apocalypse that appears in the form of war correspondent Carmine "Red" Zingiber
- Bill Paterson as R. P. Tyler (series 1), a member of the Tadfield Neighbourhood Watch and neighbour of the Young family
- Yusuf Gatewood as Famine (series 1), one of the Four Horsemen of the Apocalypse who appears in the form of dietician and entrepreneur Raven Sable
- Lourdes Faberes as Pollution (series 1), one of the Four Horsemen of the Apocalypse and appears in the place of Pestilence who has retired as a Horseman upon the discovery of penicillin
- Brian Cox (voice) and Jamie Hill (body) as Death (series 1), one of the Four Horsemen of the Apocalypse
- Gloria Obianyo as Uriel (series 2–3; guest series 1), an Archangel
- Liz Carr as Saraqael (series 2–3), an Archangel
- Quelin Sepulveda as Muriel (series 2–3), an angel

==== Featured ====
Actors credited in the opening titles of episodes in which they play a significant role.

- Reece Shearsmith as:
  - William Shakespeare (series 1)
  - Furfur, a demon official (series 2)
- Mark Gatiss as Harmony (series 1–2), a Nazi agent whom Aziraphale and Crowley encounter during the London Blitz
- Steve Pemberton as Glozier (series 1–2), a Nazi agent and Harmony's partner
- Niamh Walsh as Greta Kleinschmidt (series 1–2), a Nazi double agent
- David Morrissey as Captain Vincent (series 1), the captain of the cruise ship that runs aground on Atlantis
- Simon Merrells as Leslie the International Express Man (series 1), a man who helps summon the Four Horsemen of the Apocalypse
- Derek Jacobi as Metatron, the spokesperson for God
- Johnny Vegas as Ron Ormerod (series 1)
- Andy Hamilton as the voice of Hell's Usher (series 1)
- Benedict Cumberbatch (voice) and Niall Greig (performance capture) (series 1) and Toby Jones (series 3) as Satan, the ruler of Hell
- Elizabeth Berrington as Dagon (series 2; guest series 1, 3), one of the elite demons in Hell
- Peter Davison as Job (series 2)
- Andi Osho as Sitis (series 2), Job's wife
- Ty Tennant as Ennon (series 2), son of Job
- Sean Biggerstaff as Mr. Dalrymple (series 2), a doctor in 19th-century Edinburgh
- Julie McLellan as Wee Morag (series 2), a poor woman in 19th-century Edinburgh
- Abigail Lawrie as Elspeth (series 2), a poor grave-robber
- Tim Downie as Mr Brown (series 2), a carpet salesman and chair of the Whickber Street Traders and Shopkeepers' Association
- Donna Preston as Mrs Sandwich (series 2; guest series 3), a seamstress/brothel owner on Whickber Street
- Siân Phillips as Mrs. Henderson (series 2), a 1940s cabaret impresario
- Pete Firman as Pat (series 2), the proprietor of a magic shop in the 1940s
- Paul Chahidi as Sandalphon (series 3; guest series 1), an Archangel
- Bilal Hasna as Jesus (series 3), the "Son of God" who is to return to Earth as part of the Second Coming.
- Sean Pertwee as Brian Cameron (series 3), a crime boss operating in Soho
- Mark Addy as Harry the Fish (series 3), a card player who befriends Jesus

=== Recurring and guest ===
- Samson Marraccino as Warlock Dowling (series 1), the son of the Dowlings, mistakenly thought to be the Antichrist; he is actually Arthur and Deirdre Young's birth son
- Jill Winternitz as Harriet Dowling (series 1), wife of Thaddeus and mother of Warlock
- Josie Lawrence as Agnes Nutter (series 1), the last true witch in England. Lawrence reprises her role from the Good Omens radio adaptation.
- Amma Ris as Pepper (series 1), one of Adam's friends
- Ilan Galkoff as Brian (series 1), one of Adam's friends
- Alfie Taylor as Wensleydale (series 1), one of Adam's friends
- Nicholas Parsons as the voice of Dagon (series 1)
- Sienna Arif-Knights as Keziah (series 2), daughter of Job
- Cherry Mitra as Jemimah (series 2), daughter of Job
- Moray Hunter as Demon Josh (series 2), a demon in an eyepatch who works under Beelzebub
- Paul Adeyefa as Demon Eric (series 2–3), an underling demon
- Rich Keeble as Mr Arnold (series 2−3), a music shop owner on Whickber Street
- Jeff Alexander as Mutt (series 2), a magic shop owner on Whickber Street
- Andrew O'Neill as Mutt's spouse (series 2−3)
- Crystal Yu as Ms Cheng (series 2), a local proprietor on Whickber Street
- Anna Maryan as Justine (series 2−3), a French restaurant owner on Whickber Street
- Poppy Lee Friar as Misty Cameron (series 3), the daughter of Brian Cameron

In series 1, Jonathan Aris appears as the Quartermaster Angel, an angel who gears up the angels for Armageddon. Adam Bond portrays Jesus, whose crucifixion is witnessed by Crowley and Aziraphale. Sanjeev Bhaskar portrays Giles Baddicombe, a lawyer. Steve Oram portray Horace, a motorist on the M25 hypnotised and burned alive by Crowley's sigil. Paul Kaye and Ben Crowe make vocal cameos: Kaye as a spokesman for an electricity board (impersonating the voice of Terry Pratchett) and Crowe as Freddie Mercury. Jayde Adams and Jenny Galloway portray participants at Madame Tracy's seance. Dan Starkey portrays a passerby comforting Aziraphale. Alistair Findlay and Jim Meskimen cameo as George W. Bush with Findlay physically portraying Bush and Meskimen voicing him. Kirsty Wark, Paul Gambaccini and Konnie Huq cameo as TV presenters. James Naughtie cameos as a radio presenter. Neil Gaiman cameos as a sleeping man in the cinema. Terry Pratchett's iconic hat and scarf appear in Aziraphale's bookshop. In series 3, a portrait of Pratchett is seen hanging in a coffee shop Anthony and Asa visit.

In series 2 and "The Finale", Tracy Wiles provides the voice of the elevator that goes to Heaven and Hell. Alex Norton portrays Tulloch, a Scotsman who encounters Aziraphale.

== Episodes ==
Series	Episodes	Originally released
1	6	31 May 2019
2	6	28 July 2023
3	1	13 May 2026

=== Series 1 (2019) ===
No. overall	No. in series	Title	Directed by	Written by	Original release date
1	1	"In the Beginning"	Douglas Mackinnon	Neil Gaiman	31 May 2019
The angel Aziraphale and demon Crowley meet at the Garden of Eden, as Adam and Eve are expelled after Crowley tempted them with an apple. Fast forward to 11 years before Armageddon. Crowley delivers the infant Antichrist to a Satanic convent, where the baby is to be given to an American diplomat and his family. However, a mix-up occurs and the Antichrist ends up with a middle-class English family, the Youngs, who name him Adam. Believing the child given to the diplomat's family is the Antichrist, one of the Satanic nuns suggests he be named Warlock. Crowley and Aziraphale meet to discuss the coming apocalypse. Aziraphale reluctantly agrees to work with Crowley to prevent it and preserve the pleasures of Earth. They decide that if each works to influence the boy Warlock, he will be neither good nor evil, just normal. In the present day, Crowley and Aziraphale attend Warlock's 11th birthday party but realize they have the wrong boy when a hellhound fails to appear. Meanwhile, the hellhound has found his master, Adam Young, who lives in the village of Tadfield. Playing in the woods with his friends, Adam wishes for the kind of dogs he wants – unknowingly transforming the hellhound into a small dog – and names him "Dog", an event that initiates Armageddon.
2	2	"The Book"	Douglas Mackinnon	Neil Gaiman	31 May 2019
Aziraphale assures his superiors Gabriel and Sandalphon all is well with the Antichrist. A parcel delivery man is sent to gather the Four Horsemen of the Apocalypse; War, in the form of a war correspondent, receives an ancient sword. In 1656, the prophetess Agnes Nutter is burned at the stake by Witchfinder Thou-Shalt-Not-Commit-Adultery Pulsifer; Agnes causes an explosion, killing everyone present. Her book, The Nice and Accurate Prophecies of Agnes Nutter, Witch, is left to her family and passed through the generations. Agnes' descendant, American occultist Anathema Device, studies the prophecies to find the Antichrist and save the world. Pulsifer's descendant, Newton – who keeps losing jobs because his touch destroys electronic equipment – meets Shadwell, a modern-day witchfinder. Invited to join his crusade, Newt meets Shadwell's landlady, Madame Tracy, a part-time escort and faux medium. Drawn to Tadfield by Agnes's book, Anathema meets Adam and his friends but doesn't realize who he is. Visiting the former Satanic convent, now a corporate management retreat, Aziraphale and Crowley learn that the convent's records were destroyed in a fire. Driving back to London, Aziraphale and Crowley collide with Anathema on her bicycle. Aziraphale cures her injuries, and they give her a lift back to the village. She leaves Agnes's book in Crowley's car. Aziraphale finds and reads the book, realizing it holds the key to finding the Antichrist.
3	3	"Hard Times"	Douglas Mackinnon	Neil Gaiman	31 May 2019
A series of historical events illustrates Aziraphale and Crowley's growing relationship, ranging from Noah's Ark and the Crucifixion of Jesus through to 1960s Soho. They cross paths in Ancient Rome, Medieval England, Shakespeare's Globe Theatre, Revolutionary France, and London during the Blitz. During their time together they come to an arrangement that lets each do some of the other's work, saving time and travel. In the present day, at Jasmine Cottage, Adam and Dog find Anathema, who is furious at losing her book. She invites them inside and discusses environmental issues, which fascinate Adam. He leaves with a stack of occult magazines. Aziraphale and Crowley separately contract Shadwell to locate the Antichrist. Newton, the sole member of Shadwell's "army", is sent to investigate the village of Tadfield. The second Horseman, Famine, in the form of Dr. Raven Sable, receives his package, a measuring scale. When Crowley and Aziraphale meet to discuss their progress finding the Antichrist, Aziraphale sidesteps the question of the boy's whereabouts. They argue, and Aziraphale ends their "arrangement". That night, Adam falls asleep after poring over the magazines. His latent powers cause a nuclear reactor's core to vanish and be replaced with a sherbet lemon.
4	4	"Saturday Morning Funtime"	Douglas Mackinnon	Neil Gaiman	31 May 2019
Adam's dreams bring several magazine articles to life, including Atlantis and the Kraken. His controlling behavior worries his friends. Aziraphale fails to convince Gabriel to stop Armageddon, while his superiors question Aziraphale's loyalty after seeing proof of his meetings with Crowley. Crowley tries to talk Aziraphale into leaving Earth together. The last two Horsemen, Pollution and Death, are summoned. Driving to Tadfield, Newton crashes his car, and Adam and his friends take him to Anathema's cottage. Warlock's family arrives in Megiddo. There is no hellhound, and demon Hastur realizes Crowley lied about the Antichrist. Hastur and demon Ligur confront Crowley at his apartment, where Ligur is destroyed by holy water. Aziraphale phones Crowley admitting he's found the Antichrist, but Crowley is preoccupied with Hastur and hangs up. Hastur becomes trapped in Crowley's answering machine while Crowley grabs his keys and runs out. On the street, the angels Michael, Sandalphon, and Uriel physically confront Aziraphale, accusing him of "consorting with the enemy". At his bookshop, Aziraphale contacts God to try to stop Armageddon. Shadwell watches through the letterbox and, believing he is a demon, enters and confronts Aziraphale, who accidentally steps into the open portal and is transported to Heaven. As Shadwell leaves, he slams the door, knocking over a candle which ignites the bookshop.
5	5	"The Doomsday Option"	Douglas Mackinnon	Neil Gaiman	31 May 2019
Crowley races through London to find the bookshop in flames, with no sign of Aziraphale. In Heaven, Aziraphale refuses to join the war and, determined to stop Armageddon, leaves without a body. Crowley is getting drunk in a pub when Aziraphale's apparition appears. He learns his bookshop has burned down, but Crowley saved Agnes Nutter's book, with which Aziraphale worked out who and where the Antichrist is. They arrange to meet at Tadfield Airbase after Aziraphale finds a body to inhabit. He chooses Madame Tracy's body during a seance and convinces her and Shadwell to help stop Armageddon. Crowley is stuck on the M25 as a ring of fire surrounds London. Hastur, having escaped from the answering machine, appears next to him. Crowley drives the Bentley through the flames, using his imagination to believe the car is not on fire, while Hastur, not having any imagination, is discorporated and returned to Hell. Adam comes fully into his powers, scaring away his friends and Dog. Their rejection returns Adam to his "human self". Anathema and Newton arrive at the air base, joining Shadwell, Aziraphale/Madame Tracy, Adam, and his friends. The Four Horsemen arrive and take over the base's global communications hub. Crowley arrives in his flaming Bentley, as Adam declares: "I'M HERE."
6	6	"The Very Last Day of the Rest of Their Lives"	Douglas Mackinnon	Neil Gaiman	31 May 2019
Adam restores Aziraphale's human vessel, and his friends confront and defeat War, Pollution, and Famine, after which Death takes his leave. Lord Beelzebub and Gabriel appear to ensure Adam re-starts Armageddon according to God's Great Plan, but he refuses. Satan emerges, but Adam, encouraged by Aziraphale and Crowley, renounces him and restores the world to the state it was prior to the failed Armageddon. Found guilty of treason by their respective superiors, Aziraphale is ordered to be destroyed by hellfire, and Crowley is forced to enter a tub of holy water. To everyone's shock, both survive unharmed. Afraid of what the pair have become, Heaven and Hell agree to leave them alone on Earth. They switch back to their original bodies – Agnes Nutter's final prophecy had given them the key to surviving their executions. Life returns to normal for everyone. Madame Tracy and Shadwell decide to retire together in a cottage outside of London. The season ends with Aziraphale and Crowley enjoying lunch at the Ritz, making a toast "to the world".

=== Series 2 (2023) ===
No. overall	No. in series	Title	Directed by	Written by	Original release date
7	1	"The Arrival"	Douglas Mackinnon	Neil Gaiman and John Finnemore	28 July 2023
Before the Beginning, the then-angel Crowley creates a nebula but grows deeply disappointed when the angel Aziraphale informs him that his creation is intended merely for the enjoyment of humans and will be destroyed in 6,000 years. In modern times, Archangel Gabriel has disappeared from Heaven, and both Heaven and Hell are eager to find him. Gabriel arrives at Aziraphale's bookshop, naked, without any memories, and carrying only a cardboard box with a fly inside. Aziraphale and Crowley hope that, if they each perform half a miracle to hide Gabriel from Heaven and Hell, they will avoid attracting attention. However, their powerful miracle sets off an alarm in Heaven, allowing Archangels Michael, Uriel and Saraqael to pinpoint the miracle's location to Aziraphale's bookshop.
8	2	"The Clue"	Douglas Mackinnon	Neil Gaiman and John Finnemore	28 July 2023
In 2500 BC, God grants Hell – in the form of Crowley – permission to visit horrific disasters on Job to test his faith. Aziraphale is horrified by the prospect of destroying Job's children, and he and Crowley (disguised as Bildad) trick the angels into thinking that Job's children are dead by hiding them in the form of lizards and then restoring them, claiming they are the new children promised to Job by God. Aziraphale feels great guilt for thwarting the will of Heaven and wonders if he did the right thing. In the present, Aziraphale is visited by Michael, Uriel, and Saraqael, who traced the miracle Aziraphale and Crowley performed to the bookshop; but the miracle prevents them from recognising Gabriel. They leave, still suspicious of Aziraphale, and promise to audit his miracle, which he claims was to make cafe owner Nina fall in love with his tenant, record shop owner Maggie. Beelzebub offers to drop Hell's hostility towards Crowley in exchange for the information on where Gabriel is. Minisode "A Companion to Owls": In 2500 BC, Crowley is sent to torment Job. Aziraphale discovers Crowley has permission from God, who is trying to settle a bet with Satan. Crowley and Aziraphale end up working together to save Job's children, leading to Aziraphale's first taste of earthly pleasures, and his first defiance of Heaven.
9	3	"I Know Where I'm Going"	Douglas Mackinnon	Neil Gaiman and John Finnemore	28 July 2023
Heaven sends junior angel Muriel to spy on Aziraphale and audit the miracle, but Muriel is clueless about life on Earth and is easily misdirected. In 19th century Edinburgh, Crowley and Aziraphale chance upon a poor girl, Elspeth, who robs graves and sells the corpses to doctors to support herself and her friend Morag. Aziraphale accelerates decomposition of the body to prevent Elspeth's sale, but after the surgeon explains how corpses help medical science improve treatment of living people, he changes his mind. Back in the present, Aziraphale drives to Edinburgh in Crowley's Bentley, while Crowley hatches a plan to make Nina and Maggie fall in love. Aziraphale visits an Edinburgh pub called the Resurrectionist to investigates why records on their jukebox keep turning into Buddy Holly's "Everyday", a tune that also is being hummed by the amnesiac Gabriel. In the past, Crowley and Aziraphale try to help Elspeth and Morag dig up another corpse, but Morag is killed by a trap protecting the grave. Elspeth sells Morag's corpse to the doctor and plans to poison herself, but Crowley prevents her from doing so. He then forces Aziraphale to give her enough money to escape poverty and live a better life and claims his good deed was the result of his drinking the laudanum Elspeth was going to use. Minisode "The Resurrectionists": In 1827 Edinburgh, Aziraphale and Crowley encounter a poor grave robber and find the line between good and bad deeds on Earth isn't always clear.
10	4	"The Hitchhiker"	Douglas Mackinnon	Neil Gaiman and John Finnemore	28 July 2023
Driving Crowley’s Bentley back from Edinburgh, Aziraphale picks up someone who appears to be a hitchhiker but proves to be the demon Shax. Shax has deduced that Gabriel is hiding in the bookshop, which Aziraphale inadvertently confirms. In 1941, the three Nazi agents who were killed when Crowley interfered with their capture of Aziraphale (“Hard Times” episode) arrive in Hell. When they mention Crowley, the demon Furfur offers to spare them eternal damnation and resurrect them as zombies if they spy for him. In order to advance his rank in Hell, Furfur hopes to get proof that the demon and angel are consorting. At a West End vaudeville theatre, where the black-market whiskey Crowley was supposed to deliver has been destroyed in the Blitz, Aziraphale volunteers to perform a magic act. In spite of the zombies' use of a miracle blocker, he successfully performs the potentially lethal Bullet Catch trick with Crowley's assistance. Furfur takes a photo of the pair's cooperation and goes to present the proof to the Hell Council. However, Aziraphale has switched the photo for a theatre poster. Back in the present, Shax, with the permission of Beelzebub, plans to storm the bookshop with a legion of demons. Minisode "Nazi Zombie Flesheaters": In 1941 London, Crowley comes to Aziraphale's aid when his books and magic career are threatened by three Nazis resurrected by Hell as zombies.
11	5	"The Ball"	Douglas Mackinnon	Neil Gaiman and John Finnemore	28 July 2023
Shax is only able to acquire 70 demons, rather than a legion of 6,000, and prepares to storm the bookshop. Crowley tries to trick Gabriel into remembering who he is and realizes the Archangel's amnesia is real. Aziraphale uses a miracle to transform a shopkeepers’ meeting into a Regency-style ball, hoping the Jane Austen-inspired atmosphere will bring Maggie and Nina together. Crowley challenges the demons approaching the bookshop, and when they arrive Shax threatens to kill all the humans in the shop unless they surrender Gabriel. Gabriel surrenders himself, but Aziraphale and Crowley’s earlier miracle keeps preventing the demons from recognizing him, so they continue to threaten the bookshop. Crowley stalls for time and evacuates most of the human guests. Nina stays behind to find out what is going on and Maggie won't leave either of them behind. Crowley forces Muriel to arrest him and bring him to Heaven.
12	6	"Every Day"	Douglas Mackinnon	Neil Gaiman and John Finnemore	28 July 2023
While Aziraphale, Nina and Maggie face off against the demons, Crowley discovers the reason for Gabriel's disappearance. Because he refused to support a second attempt at Armageddon, he was demoted from his position as an Archangel, and all his memories were wiped. Crowley returns to the bookshop, where Aziraphale has successfully fended off the demons and accidentally declared war on Hell. Beelzebub appears and reveals that Gabriel hid his memories in the fly inside the box he was carrying when he arrived. Gabriel's memories – including those of his romance with Beelzebub – are restored, including their meetings in the pub where Gabriel caused "Everyday" to always be available on the jukebox. He and Beelzebub choose to abandon Heaven and Hell and vanish together. The Metatron arrives and offers Aziraphale Gabriel's former position, including the ability to restore Crowley's status as an angel. As Crowley prepares to confess his feelings to Aziraphale, Aziraphale informs Crowley that he plans to accept the Metatron's offer. Crowley asks Aziraphale to abandon Heaven and Hell with him, just as Gabriel and Beelzebub did, but Aziraphale asks Crowley to return to Heaven as an angel instead and work with him. Crowley refuses, emphatically kisses him and leaves the bookshop. Aziraphale leaves Earth (and Crowley) to go work for Heaven, where the Metatron informs him that his task will be to direct "the next step in the Great Plan," the Second Coming.

=== Series 3 (2026) ===
No. overall	No. in series	Title	Directed by	Written by	Original release date
13	1	"The Finale"	Rachel Talalay	Story by : Neil Gaiman; Teleplay by : Neil Gaiman and Michael Marshall Smith and Peter Atkins	13 May 2026
Aziraphale begins to enact the Second Coming, and assigns Sandalphon to watch the resurrected Jesus. When the Metatron goes missing, Jesus is lost in the chaos as well, along with the Book of Life. Aziraphale looks for Jesus and finds Crowley; the two reconcile. Aziraphale wins Crowley's car back from the crime boss Brian Cameron and turns his gun into a shark-shaped gun that causes Brian to start having a heart attack. Following Sandalphon's murder, Uriel confronts Michael and Michael reveals that she was the one responsible for the disappearances as the only one competent enough to enact the Apocalypse. She burns Uriel's page from the Book of Life, thus erasing her from existence. Michael begins destroying the Book of Life with people, continents, Hell, and Jesus disappearing. Crowley and Aziraphale find her, and Aziraphale forgives her. Overcome by guilt, she burns her own page, leaving Crowley and Aziraphale as the only beings left in existence, aside from God and Satan. Crowley and Aziraphale ask God to create another universe without angels, demons, heaven, hell, Satan, or God, where humans have free will. God erases the universe completely, along with Crowley and Aziraphale. In another universe, professor Anthony Crowley meets bookseller Asa Fell who invites him to dinner. Twenty years later, Fell and Crowley are married and live together in a cottage in the South Downs. Fell wonders if there is anything beyond the universe, and Crowley dismisses the idea because he has everything he ever wanted.

== Production ==
=== Development ===
Promotional poster

Pratchett and Gaiman had planned to adapt Good Omens as a movie for years, with various directors and writers attached to the project along the way. In 2011, a television series, written by Terry Jones and Gavin Scott, was first reported to be in the works but no further plans were announced. After Pratchett's death, Gaiman refused to consider ever working on the adaptation alone but changed his mind when he received a letter from Pratchett, written to be sent after his death, urging him to finish the project.

On 19 January 2017, it was announced that Amazon Prime Video and the BBC had commissioned a television series adaptation of the novel to be produced in the United Kingdom by the BBC. Distribution of the series was licensed to Amazon, and handled by BBC Worldwide in territories where Amazon Prime Video doesn't operate. Executive producers were set to include Gaiman, Caroline Skinner, Chris Sussman, Rob Wilkins, and Rod Brown. Gaiman was also set to adapt the novel for the screen and serve as showrunner for the series. Production companies involved with the series were slated to consist of BBC Studios, Narrativia, and The Blank Corporation.

On 29 June 2021, the series was renewed for a second series consisting of six episodes. In July 2023, Gaiman discussed the possibility of a third series, which was planned and would serve as the final series, though writing on it had been affected by the 2023 Writers Guild of America strike.

Gaiman's initial writing around the announcement of season two mentioned the proposed sequel to Good Omens devised by him and Terry Pratchett during the World Science Fiction Convention in Seattle in 1989, the year before the book was published. In the lead-up to the second season's release, he clarified that this was not the basis of the second season's plot, as he "didn't feel that we could drive straight from season one into that". Series two is instead a new story, intended to act as a bridge between the original and the sequel, which will form the basis for a third series.

The third and final six-episode series was announced in December 2023. Mackinnon, who had served as co-showrunner, director, and producer for the first two series, was announced to not be returning for the final series. Production of the third series was suspended in September 2024 after multiple women accused Gaiman of sexual assault. Gaiman offered to step back from the project as Amazon began to hold crisis talks. In October 2024, Gaiman exited the production and the series was reduced from a six-episode order to a single 90-minute episode. Although Gaiman is credited with writing the series finale, he would no longer serve as show runner or executive producer. In August 2025, executive producer Josh Cole revealed that post-production on the finale was nearing completion with an expected premiere slated for 2026.

=== Casting ===
Sheen as Aziraphale and Tennant as Crowley while filming Series 1

On 14 August 2017, it was announced that Michael Sheen and David Tennant had been cast in the lead roles of Aziraphale and Crowley, respectively. On 14 September 2017, Gaiman revealed on Twitter that Nina Sosanya, Ned Dennehy, and Ariyon Bakare had joined the main cast. A day later, Jack Whitehall, Michael McKean, Miranda Richardson, and Adria Arjona were announced as series regulars. A week after that, Sam Taylor Buck, Amma Ris, Ilan Galkoff, Alfie Taylor, Daniel Mays, and Siân Brooke were also cast. In October 2017, it was reported that Jon Hamm, Anna Maxwell Martin, Mireille Enos, Lourdes Faberes, and Yusuf Gatewood had joined the main cast. In November 2017, it was reported that Reece Shearsmith and Nicholas Parsons had also been cast. On 15 December 2017 it was reported that Derek Jacobi would voice the Metatron.

On 9 February 2018 it was announced that Steve Pemberton and Mark Gatiss had joined the series. On 6 March 2018, it was announced that Nick Offerman had been cast in a series regular role. On 20 July 2018, it was announced during Amazon's San Diego Comic-Con panel that Frances McDormand had been cast as the voice of God as well as the series' narrator. On 13 February 2019, Neil Gaiman announced that Benedict Cumberbatch would voice Satan, with the character itself being computer-generated imagery (CGI).

=== Filming ===
The 109 days of principal photography for the series took place over a six-month period beginning 18 September 2017 and ending in early March 2018. Shooting began throughout the UK with subsequent filming taking place in and around Cape Town, South Africa. In October 2017, the production was spotted filming in Surrey. The series also filmed in St James's Park and Tavistock Square in London and Hambleden. The Soho area of London representing the street and Aziraphale's bookshop was created and shot in Hertfordshire at Bovingdon Airbase. A vacant building in Weybridge, Surrey served as Heaven's corporate headquarters, and Hogback Wood, the location for Adam and his friends, was also filmed in Surrey. Bulstrode Park, just outside Gerrards Cross in Buckinghamshire, with its mansion and grounds, was used for the satanic convent/hospital and later the corporate training center. The American Army base was located and filmed in Upper Heyford, in Oxfordshire. The Weald and Downland Living Museum in West Sussex was used to film Agnes Nutter's burning at the stake. It was shot over a two-day period in October 2017.

The car in the novel is a 1926 Bentley, but neither Gaiman nor Pratchett really knew what a 1926 model looked like when they wrote Good Omens. For the television series, a 1933 model which had more of the look Gaiman had in mind was used. The Bentley used in filming is valued at £250,000.

Filming for the second series took place between October 2021 and March 2022 in and around Bathgate, Scotland primarily using the Pyramids Studio as well as many other nearby locations

The final, feature-length episode of the series was filmed during a five-week shoot between January and February 2025.

=== Title sequence ===
Good Omens' opening title sequence, created by the London-based Peter Anderson Studio, features music by David Arnold. When Douglas Mackinnon approached Anderson about the title sequence, Mackinnon said that he wanted something "over the top". His idea was to communicate the coming of Armageddon while also showing the humor and "fantastical tone", Crowley and Aziraphale's friendship, and the idea that good and evil are in everyone. The project was a new style of design by Anderson and his studio, and a unique design for a television series. Anderson described the result as "a totally bonkers mishmash of all animation styles in a way where they feel as if they belong together".

The actual production used physical props, animation, illustration, 3D and some live-action motion, to depict the approaching apocalypse and clash between Heaven and Hell. Studio employees were filmed in costume, on green screen; they were then cut out and animations were created. Each of the characters has either Crowley's or Aziraphale's face.

The title sequence incorporates all the characters from the series as they move towards the Apocalypse. Included are Crowley's Bentley in front of Aziraphale's bookshop, the Chattering Order of St. Beryl's nuns, Shadwell and Madame Tracy, the hellhound, flying saucers, the appearance of Death, and the Four Horsemen of the Apocalypse. Crowley's work on London's M25 is featured in the parade, along with various towns and areas of the world. In the end, characters fall from earth, landing either in Heaven or Hell, leading into the Good Omens title artwork. The entire sequence runs one minute and 40 seconds.

=== Costumes ===
Claire Anderson was the costume designer for Good Omens. She received a 2019 Emmy nomination for Outstanding Fantasy/Sci-Fi Costumes for Episode 3, Hard Times. Early design centered on main characters Aziraphale and Crowley; Anderson worked closely with actors Michael Sheen and David Tennant to design their modern-day looks. Once created, they were an important influence on their other attire throughout history.

Crowley's look reflects his transformation into human form from a serpent. The costume is modern, black, almost goth-like in style, including a "snake head" belt buckle. He often wears dark glasses to conceal his serpent eyes. His outfits always have a hint of red, including red soles on his shoes or red lining on his gloves, representing his demon snake's red belly. His jackets had a red lining on the underside of the collar. Aziraphale's outfits were the opposite of Crowley's, reflecting his ethereal nature. His angel-inspired costumes included cuff-links, a signet ring, and a pocket watch, all containing angel wings. His off-white colour palette and style maintained a Victorian Era look through modern times, with oversized lapels and shoulders representing his Angel wings.

Other costume inspirations came from details described in the Pratchett/Gaiman 1990 book. The modern-day character, Anathema Device, distantly related to prophetess Agnes Nutter, wears a Victorian "witchy look." Actor Jack Whitehall, as would-be witch-hunter Newt Pulsifer, was dressed with coat badges and epaulets with the accent colour mustard, merging modern geeky Newt with his 17th-century ancestor. He also wanted the "odd socks" from the book incorporated into his costume. Claire Anderson's idea for Jon Hamm, as Angel Gabriel, was to look perfect. She found the material on Bond Street; it was "light, ethereal and ephemeral." The suits were cashmere and made by Italian label Zegna. Hamm wore lilac contact lenses to emphasize the lilac in his "pearl gray" suit. The Satanic Nuns of the Chattering Order's costumes were created to look like regular nun habits but with a demonic undertone. Anderson looked at nuns through the years and chose to use "peaky hats", which had a more witch-like feeling rather than an evil one. The costumes included a luciferian pendant and symbolic watches. The demons from Hell, Lord Beelzebub, Duke Hastur and Ligur, wore carefully blackened clothing with shredded hems to appear as if scorched in Hell. Mr and Mrs. Young, the Antichrist Adam's parents, were dressed in a nostalgic, "timeless and comforting" 1950s look to represent their dependability. Anderson used her own parents' friends as inspiration. Sergeant Shadwell is "grubby", wearing drab colours reflecting it. His defining look is a jacket with elements of a uniform to represent his Witchfinder Army role. Madame Tracy wore costumes reflecting her dual jobs as psychic reader and sex worker. "Flowing gowns" and colours reflecting "kookiness" were used for her mystic persona, while an ostentatious kimono represented her "lady of the night" role. Many costumes had visual effects, added later, which required small tape markers in the shape of green crosses on people's bodies.

The cold opening, featuring a flashback through history in Episode 3, required costumes representing historical periods from the Garden of Eden in 4004 BC to Soho, London in 1967. Anderson took inspiration from pre-Raphaelite paintings, and from hippie clothes from the movie Serpico. Throughout the epochs, each costume reflected the period as well as the Angel/Demon aspect of the characters. The scene with Crowley and Aziraphale in armor has black throughout Crowley's armor while Aziraphale's is silvery and light. A snakeskin-like texture is part of the robes and gowns Crowley wears in ancient times.

=== Special effects ===
London-based Milk VFX was chosen to create all the visual effects for Good Omens. Jean-Claude Deguara, co-founder, began work in the pre-production, pre-script stage of the series. During pre-production, the six scripts were broken down to work out how the visual effects (VFX) could interact effectively with the story in each episode. Neil Gaiman was a constant source of help as he could quote from the book to help with creative decisions. The goal was to use in-camera shots wherever possible. The Noah's Ark scene in Episode 3 used live-action elements wherever possible, including the smaller animals; larger animals were added in post-production. Special effects were to be used as part of the scene and "grounded in reality", not to stand out on their own. Sixty visual-effect specialists, the most Milk had used on a single project, worked over a two-year period to create a wide range of effects; 650 CGI shots were created for the six episodes. Post-production time was five months.

Deguara and his crew created a wide range of effects including creatures, environments, and fire. Among the environments created was a penthouse for Heaven with "ever-changing" views of the famous landmarks of the world. The escalator to Hell was filmed in a modern office building in London using real-time cinematography as well as a green screen for special effects depicting Crowley's descent from the lobby. The Soho site for Aziraphale's bookshop, built at Bovington Airfield, used a green screen to extend the streets in post-production. The site was used because Aziraphale's bookshop had to burn down with real fire, not just visual effects, which wasn't possible in Soho. The opening scene of Episode 1 at the Garden of Eden, filmed in South Africa, included "many green screen and interactive VFX" to create a big visual effects scene. Episode 4 featured a visual effect of Crowley (David Tennant) flying through the telephone system, chased by Hastur, the Duke of Hell (Ned Dennehy). Tennant was in a rig that allowed him to "twist and roll at speed", while Dennehy used a wire. Digitally-created "glitch-type movements" were created to make Tennant's part look realistic and to hide the rig.

Crowley's Bentley, prominently seen through the series, is often shown racing through London at speeds over 100 mph. The car had to look authentic, but no real Bentley would have been able to go this fast. The filming was one of the first effects Milk VFX learned about. After locating a real Bentley, CGI assets were created for the scenes on the street as well as inside the Bentley. The car used is actually a combination of five different CGI, real, and built versions. The Bentley that blew up in Episode 6 is real; the interior was removed and the exterior blown up. Rather than using digital effects to create the scenery as Crowley is driving, director of photography Gavin Finney used an older technique called rear projection. Films are first made of passing scenery from all sides of a moving vehicle; then, on the set, the filmed scenes are projected onto a screen. Finney explained: "It means you see the footage as well as reflections on the glass or the driver's face, say as the vehicle goes under trees, while it also works as a lighting source."

The model for the hellhound was a Great Dane dog with similar colouring to the small dog used later. Using a blue screen, the live dog was filmed, then partially enlarged in CGI to create the monstrous head and neck. The effect was used for a couple of scenes, but the transformation to a small dog used a real dog. The final episode features a confrontation between Adam Young, the child Antichrist, and Satan, his "father who is no longer in Heaven". The original concept of Satan was much more "hellish"; however, Neil Gaiman wanted a more human form of the 500-foot-tall creature, rather than including "hellfire" and over-the-top demonic action. Certain effects were scaled back in the rise of Satan from Hell so that the focus became the more "human" interaction between a father and a rebellious son who rejects him. Sound effects, such as body sounds, rocks, and moving earth, were used to emphasize Satan's size and power. Other visual effects included a short demon named Usher, sacrificed to test holy water; a kraken rising in the sea; wings for Crowley and Aziraphale; and maggots overwhelming a call center when Hastur escapes after being trapped in Crowley's voicemail. Crowley's snake eyes were created using contact lenses for the most part, but were digitally enhanced for close-ups.

=== Music ===
Good Omens features music written by Emmy winning composer David Arnold, along with quite a few Queen songs throughout the series. Arnold received two Emmy nominations for Outstanding Main Title theme and for the episode "In the Beginning." He said his work on Good Omens was unlike any he had done. "It might be the hardest I've worked on anything." He described the series as "a universe-sized show in need of a universe-sized score." He called the opening theme "a kind of wicked, slightly, devilish, Mephistophelean waltz—it has a feeling of twirling, out-of-control-ness." He rewrote the main theme for the end credits of each episode to reflect what happened in it.

Arnold used unusual instrumentation to create themes for episodes and themes, including lutes, lyres, bass brass and drums, and harps, depending on their imagery or emotion. He wanted to combine "heavenly" and "satanic" elements so that when something sounded good, there was also an element of bad. He said, "Whenever there was a sweet violin, there would be its nasty brother lurking alongside it." The use of Queen's music, reflecting a running gag of the novel where every tape Crowley put on his car stereo turned out to be of said band, included a brass band arrangement of "Lazing on a Sunday Afternoon". Arnold was a Queen fan as a teenager, studying how they created sounds, and said the choirs and chorale sounds in certain parts of the series reflected this influence.

== Release ==
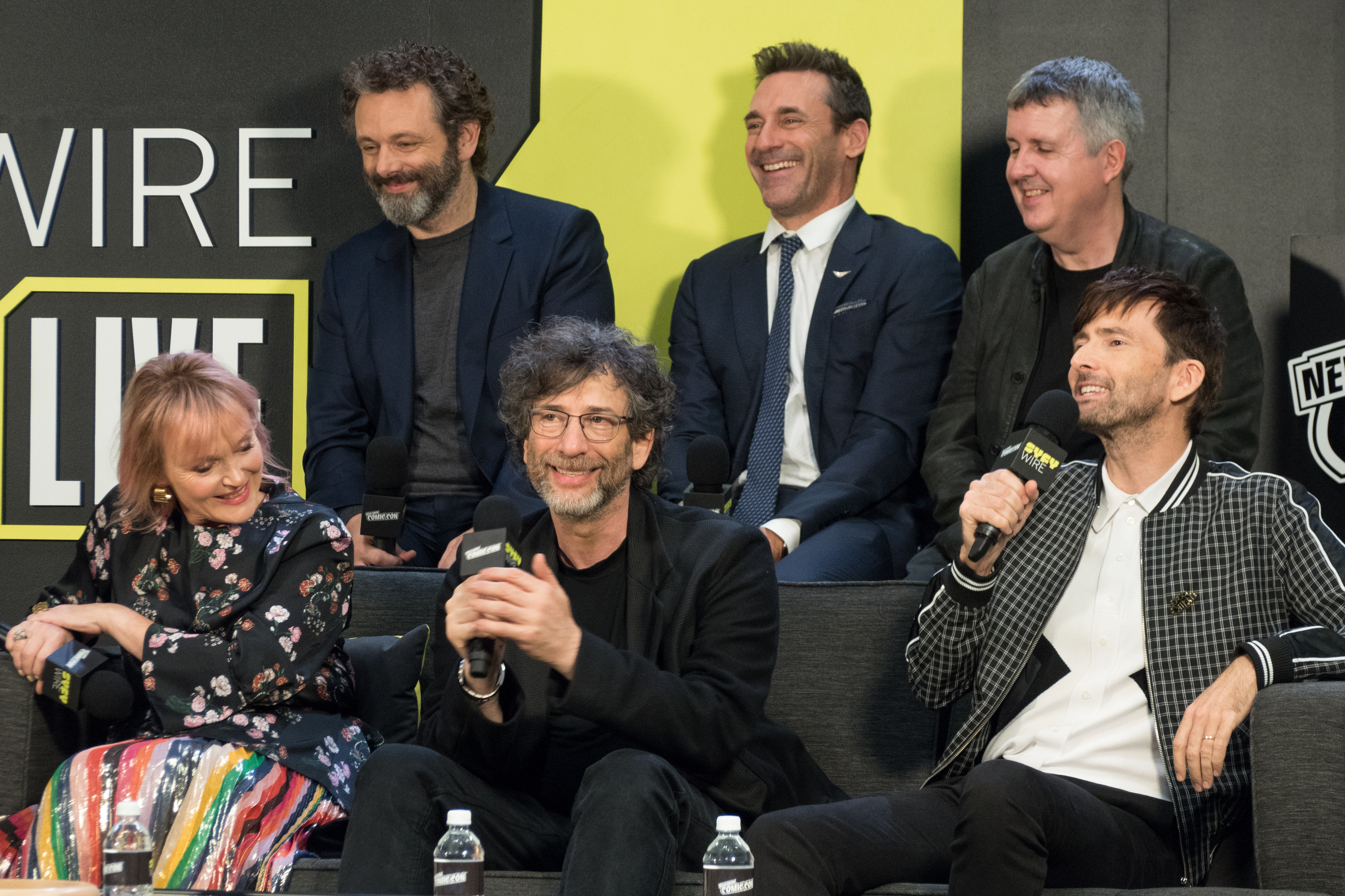
Good Omens interview at New York Comic Con in October 2018. Front: Richardson, Gaiman, and Tennant. Rear: Sheen, Hamm, and Mackinnon

The six episodes of the first series were released on Amazon Prime Video on 31 May 2019, and aired weekly on BBC Two between 15 January and 19 February 2020. The second series was released in its entirety on Amazon Prime Video on 28 July 2023. The final episode was released on 13 May 2026.

David Tennant and Michael Sheen reprised their respective roles in voice-only form for a 3-minute short titled "Good Omens: Lockdown" which was released on YouTube on 1 May 2020. The short imagines how their characters might be doing in isolation during the COVID-19 pandemic.

=== Marketing ===
First series' trailer title card

On 6 October 2018, the series held a panel at the annual New York Comic Con in New York City. It was moderated by Whoopi Goldberg and featured creator Neil Gaiman, director Douglas Mackinnon, and cast members Michael Sheen, David Tennant, Jon Hamm and Miranda Richardson. During the panel, the series' first trailer was premiered and subsequently released online.

AT SXSW 2019, Amazon Prime hosted a Good Omens "Garden of Eden" Party in Austin, Texas during the entire week of the festival. The party was hosted by performers dressed as angels and demons, with free food, hair and nail services, and a complimentary bar. David Tennant, Michael Sheen, Jon Hamm, Douglas Mackinnon and Neil Gaiman made guest appearances, and an episode of the series received an early screening at the Zach Theatre. A party hosted at the Garden by Entertainment Weekly featured a fire-breather and a Queen cover band. Good Omens-branded umbrellas and tote bags were handed out at the pop-up experience, and the Garden featured a petting zoo full of local puppies called "Hell Hounds".

== Reception ==
=== Critical response ===
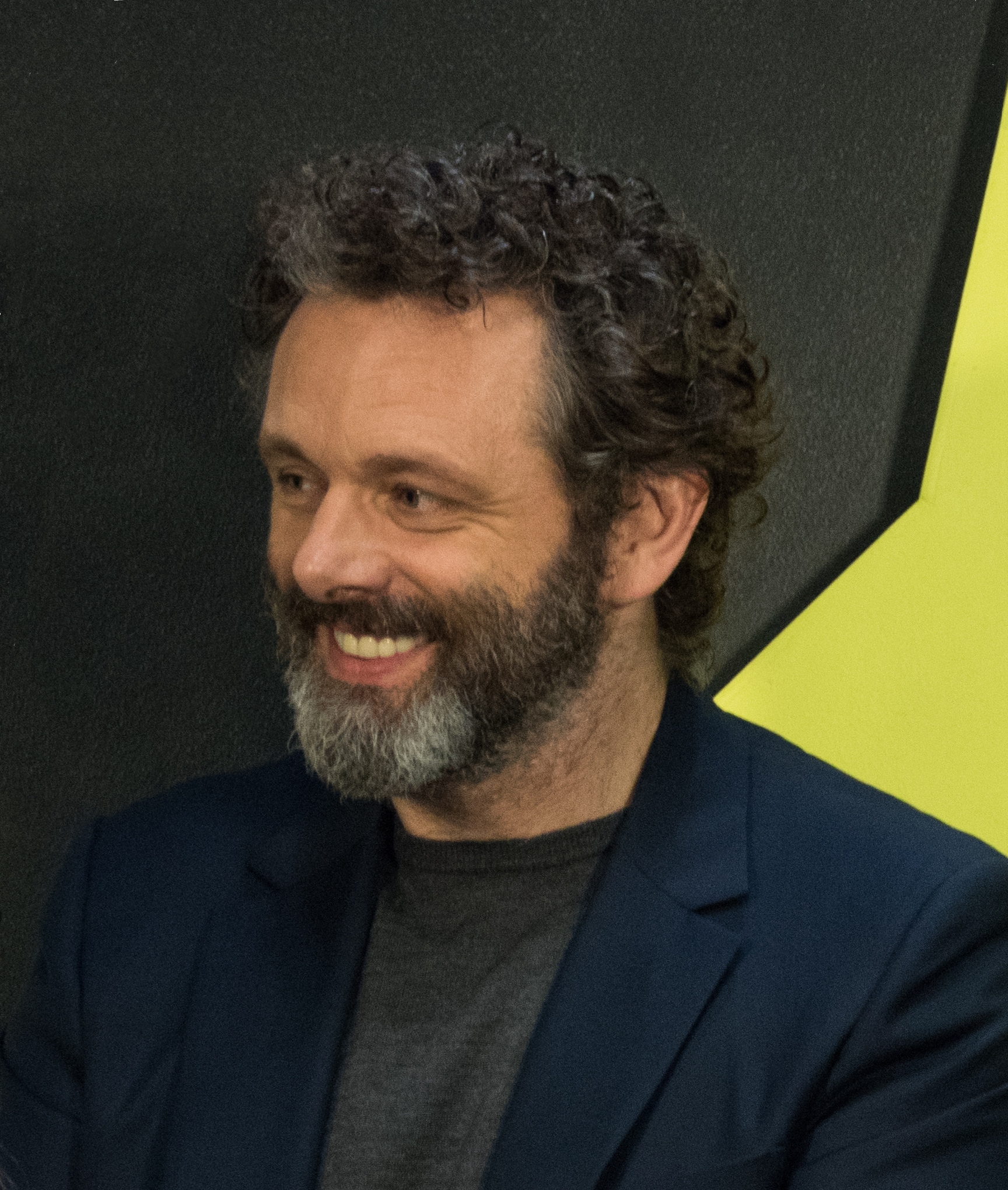
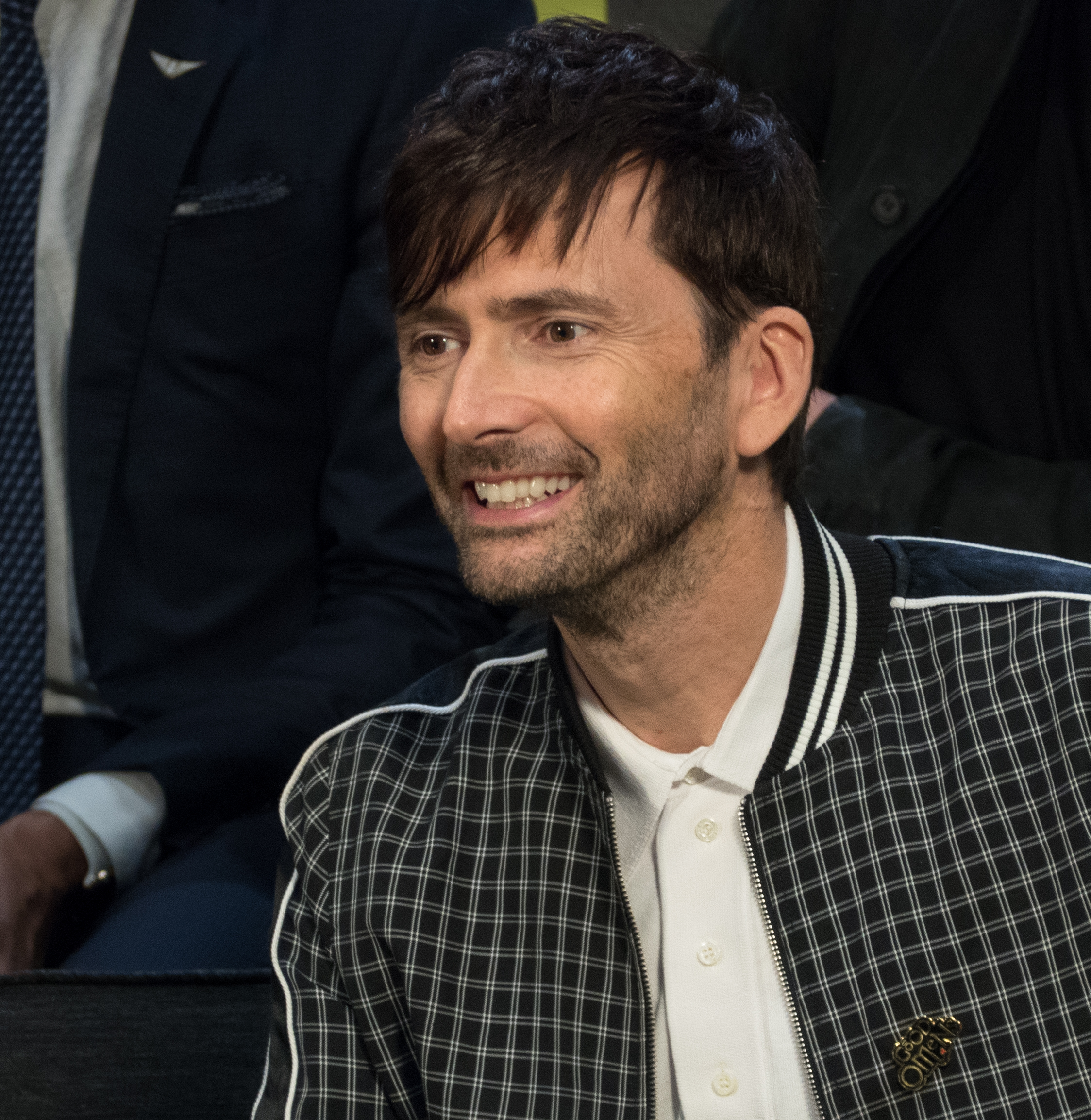
Michael Sheen and David Tennant received critical acclaim for their performances as Aziraphale and Crowley.

The first series of Good Omens has received positive reviews from critics. On Rotten Tomatoes, it has an approval rating of 85% with an average score of 7.3/10, based on 98 reviews. The website's critical consensus reads, "A smörgåsbord of heavenly imagery and irreverent hilarity, Good Omens works thanks to Michael Sheen and David Tennant's very-nearly-holy (or maybe unholy?) chemistry – though, at only six episodes long, it's a rare adaptation that may have benefited from being a little less faithful to the good book." On Metacritic, it has a score of 66 out of 100 based on 21 reviews, indicating "generally favorable reviews".

The second series also received positive reviews from critics. On Rotten Tomatoes, it has an approval rating of 88% with an average score of 7.4/10, based on 64 reviews. The website's critical consensus reads, "Boding well for the series' longevity, Good Omens' second season is even more splendid than the first." On Metacritic, it has a score of 68 out of 100 based on 16 reviews, indicating "generally favorable reviews".

The third series received mixed reviews from critics. On Rotten Tomatoes, it has an approval rating of 62% with an average rating of 5.1/10, based on 21 reviews. The website's critical consensus reads, "Closing out the series with a serviceable final entry, Good Omens crafts a heartfelt goodbye thanks in part to David Tennant and Michael Sheen's unwavering performances." On Metacritic, it has a score of 61 out of 100 based on 7 reviews, indicating "generally favorable reviews".

=== Ending controversy and fallout with the Terry Pratchett estate ===
As well as being highly controversial amongst the fanbase, there was significant tension behind the scenes with regards to the series's ending. After the release of the final episode, Rob Wilkins, manager of the Terry Pratchett Estate and widely considered "Terry's representative on Earth," revealed that Neil Gaiman had changed the series's original happy ending – in which Crowley and Aziraphale retain their current identities and enjoy a mortal life together – that he had initially written with Terry Pratchett, and that Pratchett had approved prior to his death in 2015, to a more heartbreaking one. The Terry Pratchett estate vehemently opposed Gaiman's new, more tragic ending, and spent many months, including after Gaiman left the project, attempting to restore the story's original ending. Despite these repeated attempts, in the end the estate was ignored and ultimately excluded from the production, resulting in the use of Gaiman's new conclusion for the series finale and a fractured relationship between Amazon and the estate.

=== Petition for cancellation ===
An online petition requesting that the streaming service (misidentified as Netflix) cancel Good Omens reportedly received more than 20,000 signatures from people objecting to its content; it was actually on Amazon Prime. The petition, posted as part of a campaign by US religious organization Return to Order, criticized the show's irreverent treatment of topics relating to Satanism and the devil, and the use of a female voice for God. The original petition was removed from the site, corrected and reposted.

=== Accolades ===
Year	Award	Category	Recipient	Result	Ref.
2019	Golden Trailer Award	Best Comedy Poster for a TV/Streaming Series	Good Omens	Nominated	
2019	Saturn Awards	Best Streaming Science Fiction, Action, & Fantasy Series	Good Omens	Nominated	
2019	Saturn Awards	Best Actor in a Streaming Presentation	David Tennant	Nominated	
2019	Saturn Awards	Best Supporting Actor in a Streaming Presentation	Michael Sheen	Nominated	
2019	Primetime Emmy Awards	Outstanding Fantasy/Sci-Fi Costumes	Claire Anderson, Bobbie Edwards, Beth Lewis	Nominated	
2019	Primetime Emmy Awards	Outstanding Music Composition for a Limited Series, Movie or Special (Original Dramatic Score)	David Arnold	Nominated	
2019	Primetime Emmy Awards	Outstanding Original Main Title Theme Music	David Arnold	Nominated	
2019	Comedy.co.uk Awards	Best TV Comedy Drama	Good Omens	Won	
2019	Comedy.co.uk Awards	Best Comedy of the Year	Good Omens	Won	
2019	Dragon Award	Best Science Fiction or Fantasy TV Series	Good Omens	Won	
2019	Online Film & Television Association (OFTA) Television Award	Best Make-Up/Hairstyling in a Non-Series	Good Omens	Nominated	
2019	Online Film & Television Association (OFTA) Television Award	Best New Theme Song in a Series	Good Omens	Nominated	
2019	National Television Award	Best Comedy	Good Omens	Nominated	
2019	C21 International Drama Award	Best English Language Drama (Series)	Good Omens	Nominated	
2019	TV Times Award	Favourite On-Demand Show	Good Omens	Won	
2019	Nebula Award	Ray Bradbury Award for Outstanding Dramatic Presentation	Neil Gaiman (Episode: "Hard Times")	Won	
2020	IFMCA Award	Best Original Score for a Television Series	David Arnold	Nominated	
2020	BSC Award	Best Cinematography in a Television Drama	Gavin Finney (Episode: "Hard Times")	Nominated	
2020	Sandford St Martin Award	Radio Times Readers' Award	Good Omens	Won	
2020	Tell-Tale TV Awards	Favorite Limited Series or TV Movie	Good Omens	Won	
2020	Tell-Tale TV Awards	Favorite Actress in a Limited Series or TV Movie	Frances McDormand	Won	
2020	Tell-Tale TV Awards	Favorite Actor in a Limited Series or TV Movie	David Tennant	Won	
2020	Tell-Tale TV Awards	Favorite Actor in a Limited Series or TV Movie	Michael Sheen	Nominated	
2020	Hugo Award	Best Dramatic Presentation, Long Form	Neil Gaiman, Douglas Mackinnon	Won	
2020	Peabody Award	Entertainment	Good Omens	Nominated	
2020	BAFTA TV Craft Award	Special, Visual & Graphic Effects	Milk Visual Effects, Gareth Spensley, Real SFX	Nominated	
2020	Scottish Comedy Award	Best Actor	David Tennant	Won	
2020	European Science Fiction Awards	Best Dramatic Presentation	Good Omens	Won	
2023	Saturn Awards	Best Fantasy Television Series	Good Omens	Nominated	
2023	Comedy.co.uk Awards	Best TV Comedy Drama	Good Omens	Won	
2024	GLAAD Media Awards	Outstanding Comedy Series	Good Omens	Nominated	
2024	BAFTA TV Awards	Male Performance in a Comedy	David Tennant	Nominated	
2024	BAFTA Television Craft Awards	Titles and Graphic Identity	Peter Anderson Studio	Nominated	
2024	Tell-Tale TV Awards	Favorite Sci-fi / Fantasy / Horror Series:	Good Omens	Won	
2024	Tell-Tale TV Awards	Favorite Performer in a Sci-fi / Fantasy / Horror Series:	Michael Sheen	Won	
2024	Tell-Tale TV Awards	Favorite Performer in a Sci-fi / Fantasy / Horror Series:	David Tennant	Nominated	
2024	Astra Awards	Best Actor in a Streaming Comedy Series	Michael Sheen	Nominated	
2024	Astra Awards	Best Actor in a Streaming Comedy Series	David Tennant	Nominated	

== See also ==
- List of films about angels
