= 2013 British Academy Television Craft Awards =

Technical achievements in television awards ceremony

14th British Academy Television Craft Awards
- Date: 28 April 2013
- Site: The Brewery, London
- Hosted by: Stephen Mangan

The 14th Annual British Academy Television Craft Awards were presented by the British Academy of Film and Television Arts (BAFTA) on 28 April 2013, with Stephen Mangan presiding over the event. The awards were held at The Brewery, City of London, and given in recognition of technical achievements in British television of 2012.

== Winners and nominees ==
Winners are listed first and highlighted in boldface; the nominees are listed below alphabetically and not in boldface.

Best Breakthrough Talent	Best Director - Fiction/Entertainment
**Tim Whitnall** (writer) – **Best Possible Taste: The Kenny Everett Story**; Mike Bartlett (writer) – The Town; Julie Gearey (writer) – Prisoners' Wives; Rhys Thomas (director) – Freddie Mercury: The Great Pretender	**Philippa Lowthorpe** – **Call the Midwife**; Julian Jarrold – The Girl; Birger Larsen – Murder: Joint Enterprise; Hettie Macdonald – Hit & Miss
Best Director - Factual	Best Director - Multi-Camera
**Ben Chanan** – **The Plot to Bring Down Britain's Planes**; Ben Anthony – 7/7 One Day in London; John Dower – Bradley Wiggins: A Year in Yellow; Katharine English – Our War	**Hamish Hamilton** and **Tapani Parm** – **The London 2012 Olympic Opening Ceremony: Isles of Wonder**; Hamish Hamilton and Tapani Parm – The London 2012 Olympic Closing Ceremony: Symphony of British Music; Paul Davies – The London 2012 Olympics: Super Saturday; Nikki Parsons – Strictly Come Dancing
Best Writer - Comedy	Best Writer - Drama
**Julia Davis** – **Hunderby**; Jo Brand, Vicki Pepperdine and Joanna Scanlan – Getting On; John Morton – Twenty Twelve; Writing Team^{[A]} – The Thick of It	**Sally Wainwright** – **Last Tango in Halifax**; Shaun Duggan and Jimmy McGovern – Accused (for "Tracey's Story"); Tom Stoppard – Parade's End; Gwyneth Hughes – The Girl
Best Make Up and Hair Design	Best Production Design
**Call the Midwife** – **Christine Walmesley-Cotham**; Ripper Street – Eileen Buggy and Sharon Doyle; Parade's End – Jan Archibald; The Girl – Nadine Prigge, Neill Gorton and Clinton Aiden Smith	**The Girl** – **Darryl Hammer**; Downton Abbey – Donal Woods; The Hour – Eve Stewart; Parade's End – Martin Childs
Best Visual Effects and Graphic Design	Best Costume Design
**Titanic** – **Tom Turnbull**; The Psychology of Winning – Robin Nurse, Julian Gibbs and Richard Gort; Parade's End – Rupert Ray and Benuts; Doctor Who – The Mill	**Parade's End** – **Sheena Napier**; Mrs Biggs – Amy Roberts; Richard II (The Hollow Crown) – Odile Dicks-Mireaux; Ripper Street – Lorna Marie Mugan
Best Photography – Factual	Best Photography and Lighting – Fiction
**Amish: A Secret Life** – **Steve Robinson**; Kingdom of Plants 3D – Tim Cragg, Robert Hollingworth and Tim Shepherd; Supersized Earth – Julius Brighton and Paul O'Callaghan; Return to the Falklands – Rupert Binsley	**The Fear** – **Gavin Finney**; Ripper Street – Julian Court; Blackout – Christopher Ross; Hunted – Balazs Bolygo
Best Editing – Factual	Best Editing – Fiction
**Amish: A Secret Life** – Sean Mackenzie; The Secret History of Our Streets (for "Portland Road") – Michael Harrowes; Britain in a Day – Peter Christelis; 7/7 One Day in London – Rupert Houseman	**The Fear** (for "Episode 1") – **Trevor Waite**; Ripper Street – Úna Ní Dhonghaíle; The Thick of It – Anthony Boys and Gary Dollner; The Hour (for "Episode 1") – Gareth C. Scales
Best Digital Creativity	Best Entertainment Craft Team
**Channel 4 Paralympics** – **Steve Boulton** and **James Rutherford**; The Great British Property Scandal – Production team; Embarrassing Bodies: Live from the Clinic – Production team; Foxes Live: Wild in the City – Production team	**Stephen Bryce, Andrew Cooke, Simon Ainge, Nick Foster** and **Derren Brown** – **Apocalypse**; Durham Marenghi, Steve Nolan, Sam Pattinson and Tim Routledge – Diamond Jubilee Concert; Dan James, James Hart, Richard Porter and Kate Jones-Mackay – Top Gear; Dave Davey, Robert Edwards, Florian Wieder and Falk Rosenthal – The X Factor (for "Final")
Best Sound – Factual	Best Sound – Fiction
**The London 2012 Olympics: Super Saturday** – **Peter Bridges**; The Plane Crash – Grant Covacic, Pete Lee, Karl Mainzer and Michael Wood; Top Gear – Chris Lebert, Robert Entwistle, Russell Edwards and Kiff McManus; Brazil with Michael Palin – George Foulgham and Sebastian Dunn	**Richard II (The Hollow Crown)** – **Tim Fraser, Adrian Rhodes** and **Keith Marriner**; Accused (for "Mo & Sue's Story") – Graham Headicar, Emma Pegram, Stuart Hilliker and Grant Bridgeman; Wallander – Paul Hamblin, Matt Skelding, Jim Goddard and Martin Beresford; The Hour – John Mooney, Nigel Squibbs, Jamie Caple and Marc Lawes
Best Original Television Music
**Henry IV (The Hollow Crown)** – **Stephen Warbeck**; The Snowman and the Snowdog – Ilan Eshkeri and Andy Burrows; Doctor Who (for "Asylum of the Daleks") – Murray Gold; The Hour – Kevin Sargent

== Notes ==
A: The BAFTA website does not list the individual names of the writers for The Thick of It. The writing team consists of: Jesse Armstrong, Simon Blackwell, Roger Drew, Sean Gray, Armando Iannucci, Ian Martin, Will Smith and Tony Roche.

== See also ==
- British Academy Television Awards 2013
