= Ian Moo-Young =

Jamaican artist

- Born: January 29, 1943 (age 83); Kingston, Jamaica
- Education: Central Saint Martins College of Art & Design
- Known for: Graphic design, Animation

Ian Moo-Young is an animator and graphic design artist.

His talents were noticed at an early age in Kingston Jamaica and he received a scholarship from the British Council to study at Central Saint Martins College of Art & Design.

Moo-Young had great success in the field of advertising, and was pioneer of British animation, thanks to which he was nominated for a BAFTA Award for Television Craft in 1979 for Read All About It. Whilst providing animation for Kama Sutra Rides Again he worked under Bob Godfrey, best known for his work on Roobarb. He made TV commercials for Swissair, Kellogg's Rice Krispies, British Rail, Club Med and the first-ever on-air tampon commercial.

Moo-Young resides in Canada with his wife.

== Filmography ==
Title	Role
Television Licence Evasion	Director
Pavlov/Pavlova, Dom Sweet Dom, Tchai/Tchaikovsky	Director
Shell: Drop	Director
Kelloggs: Breakfast Sounds	Director
Sanyo: Beach	Director
Fitness Magazine	Director
Trebor Dandies: Norman Normal	Director
Ian Moo Young (1985)	Interviewee
The Princess and the Pea (1984)	Series Producer
Radio Stars (1983)	Director
History of Grease (1983)	Director
The Four Musicians (1982)	Director/Animator
The Princess and the Pea (1982)	Director/Animator
Rapunzel (1982)	Director/Animator
The Emperor's New Clothes (1982)	Director/Animator
Puss in Boots (1982)	Director/Animator
The Ugly Duckling (1982)	Director/Animator
Omnibus [09/05/82]	Graphic Designer
The Vital Link (1981)	Animator
Pavlov/Pavlova (1980)	Director
The Chord Sharp (1980)	A film by
Charlie Muffin (1979)	Titles
The World of Netlon (1978)	Animator
The Ballad of Lucy Jordan (1975)	Director of Photography
Great (1975)	Animator/Graphic Designer
Alice in Label Land (1974)	Food and Packages
Making Music Together (1973)	Assistant Animator
Kama Sutra Rides Again (1971)	Animation
The Ballad of Lucy Jordan (1970)	Director/Writer/Camera/Animator
Lucy Jordan (1970)	Director
The Electron's Tale (1970)	Animator
Henry 9 'til 5 (1970)	Animation & Artwork
